= Peter Norbeck Scenic Byway =

Scenic drive in South Dakota

Peter Norbeck Scenic Byway
- Peter Norbeck Scenic Byway highlighted in red

Route information
- Maintained by SDDOT
- Length: 68.0 mi (109.4 km)
- Existed: September 19, 1996–present
- Component highways: US 16A; SD 87; SD 89; SD 244

Location
- Country: United States
- State: South Dakota
- Counties: Custer, Pennington

Highway system
- Scenic Byways; National; National Forest; BLM; NPS; South Dakota State Trunk Highway System; Interstate; US; State
Southwestern South Dakota
Sculptures
- Mount Rushmore (National memorial)
- Crazy Horse
Geologic and natural history
- Badlands (National park)
- The Mammoth Site
- Needles
- Spearfish Canyon
Mountains
- Black Hills
- Bear Butte (National Historic Landmark)
- Black Elk Peak
Caves
- Wind Cave (National park)
- Jewel Cave (National monument)
Forests and wildernesses
- Custer (State Park)
- Black Hills (National Forest)
- Black Elk (Wilderness)
- Buffalo Gap (National Grassland)
Lakes
- Sylvan
- Pactola
Long-distance trails
- Centennial Trail
- George S. Mickelson Trail
Scenic byways
- Peter Norbeck Scenic Byway
- Spearfish Canyon
Historic sites
- Minuteman Missile (National Historic Site)

The Peter Norbeck Scenic Byway is a National Scenic Byway in the Black Hills National Forest in the southwestern part of the U.S. state of South Dakota. It is a loop which is composed of portions of U.S. Route 16A (US 16A), South Dakota Highway 244 (SD 244), SD 87, and SD 89. Parts of the byway enter Black Hills National Forest, Custer State Park, and the Mount Rushmore National Memorial; the byway also travels within five miles (eight point zero kilometres) of the Crazy Horse Memorial. The byway is named after Peter Norbeck, who served as governor of and senator for South Dakota.

== Route description ==
The Peter Norbeck Scenic Byway consists of a loop made up of four numbered highways. The byway is part of US 16A, the Iron Mountain Road, south of Keystone. This portion of the highway includes several tunnels and pigtail bridges. The byway enters Custer State Park along its eastern edge and turns west at its intersection with SD 36. In the western part of the state park, the byway splits into two highways, one which follows US 16A westward and one which follows SD 87 northward. The US 16A portion of the byway runs into Custer, where the byway becomes part of SD 89 and heads north. This portion of the byway meets the SD 87 portion in the northwest corner of Custer State Park. The byway then follows SD 87 to its intersection with US 16 and US 385, where it becomes part of the nearby SD 244. The byway follows SD 244 eastward into the Mount Rushmore National Memorial, where it meets up with US 16A.

== History ==
Most of the roads which make up the Peter Norbeck Scenic Byway were proposed by Peter Norbeck when he was a U.S. Senator. Norbeck's first major proposal was the Needles Highway, which comprises the SD 87 portion of the byway and cuts through the Needles. Though engineers of the time said a highway could not be built in the Needles, the highway still came into existence. Norbeck also proposed the Iron Mountain Road, the US 16A section of the byway. The byway was established on September 23, 1996, and named in honor of Norbeck.
