= South Dakota Highway 244 =

State highway in South Dakota, United States

Highway 244

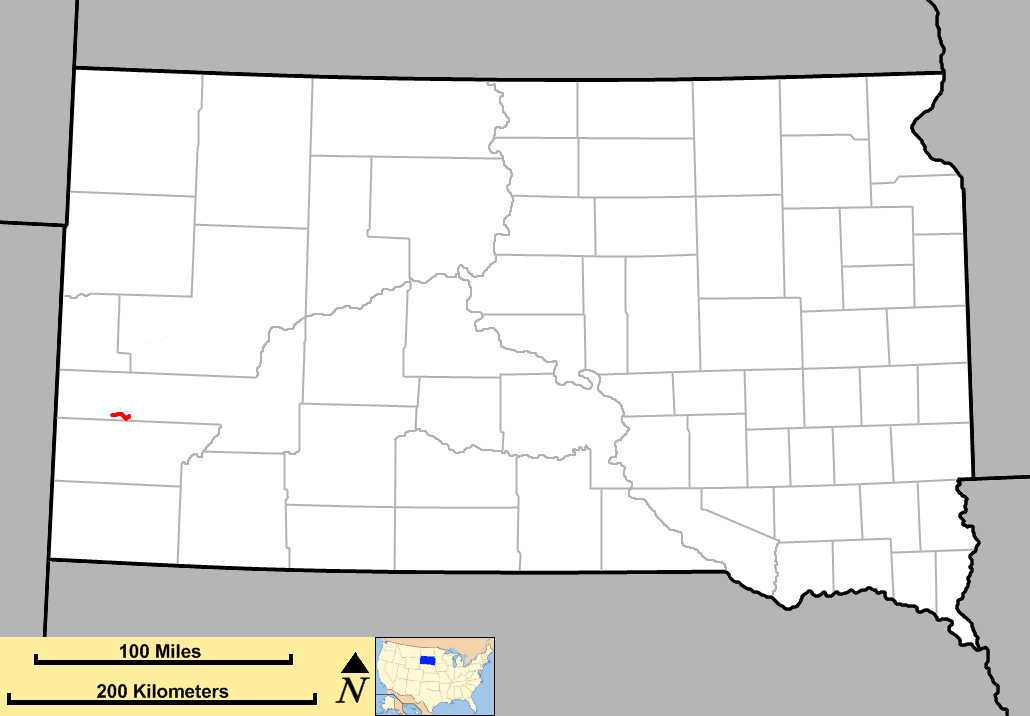
- Route of SD 244 (in red)

Route information
- Maintained by SDDOT
- Length: 10.457 mi (16.829 km)
- Existed: 1975–present

Major junctions
- West end: US 16 / US 385 near Hill City
- East end: US 16A near Keystone

Location
- Country: United States
- State: South Dakota
- Counties: Pennington

Highway system
- South Dakota State Trunk Highway System; Interstate; US; State
← SD 240	→ SD 245

South Dakota Highway 244 (SD 244) is a short state highway located entirely within Pennington County, South Dakota which provides access to Mount Rushmore. Highway 244 runs generally east–west between its eastern terminus at US 16A near Keystone and its western terminus at US 16/US 385 south of Hill City. The entire route is part of the Peter Norbeck Scenic Byway. SD 244 does not connect to its parent route.

== Route description ==
SD 244 begins in the Black Hills National Forest at an intersection with U.S. Route 16 (US 16) and US 385 south of Hill City. It heads to the east, winding through the forest where it passes Summit Peak. Near Old Baldy Mountain, the route enters the Mount Rushmore National Monument area. It curves around the park and heads back to the north. The route ends at US 16A south of Keystone.

== History ==
Highway 244 was originally part of South Dakota Highway 87. The switch to Highway 244 occurred in 1975, with the signs being concurrently posted until January 1, 1977.

== Major intersections ==
The entire route is in Pennington County.

Location	mi	km	Destinations	Notes
	0.000	0.000	US 16 / US 385 – Custer, Hill City, Rapid City, Crazy Horse Mt., Sylvan Lake, Needles Highway, Jewel Cave National Monument, Sheridan Lake	Western terminus
Mount Rushmore	10.457	16.829	US 16A – Custer State Park, Keystone	Eastern terminus
1.000 mi = 1.609 km; 1.000 km = 0.621 mi
