= South Dakota Highway 40 =

State highway in South Dakota, United States

Highway 40

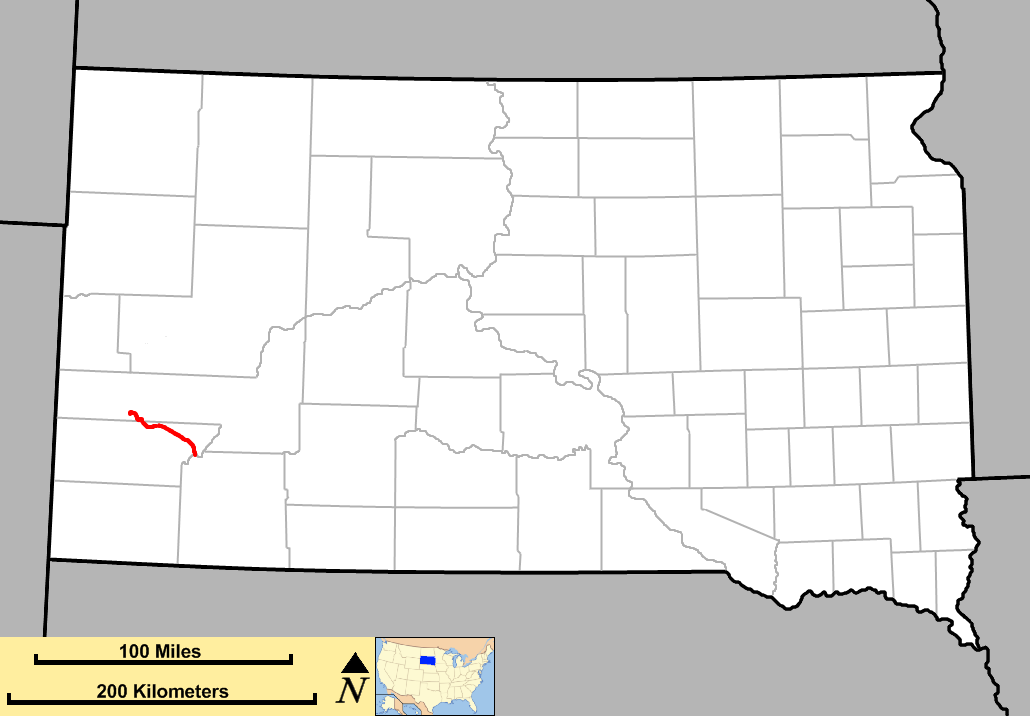
- SD 40 highlighted in red

Route information
- Maintained by SDDOT
- Length: 37.369 mi (60.140 km)
- Existed: 1976–present

Major junctions
- West end: US 16A in Keystone
- SD 79 in Hermosa
- East end: BIA 41 in Red Shirt

Location
- Country: United States
- State: South Dakota
- Counties: Pennington, Custer, Oglala Lakota

Highway system
- South Dakota State Trunk Highway System; Interstate; US; State
← SD 38	→ SD 42

South Dakota Highway 40 (SD 40) is a state highway in southwestern part of the US state of South Dakota. The highway is just over 37 miles (60 km) long and runs from U.S. Route 16A (US 16A) in Keystone to Bureau of Indian Affairs Highway 41 (BIA 41) in Red Shirt. The highway runs near Mount Rushmore National Memorial in Keystone, and its eastern terminus is on the Pine Ridge Indian Reservation near the edge of Badlands National Park.

== Route description ==
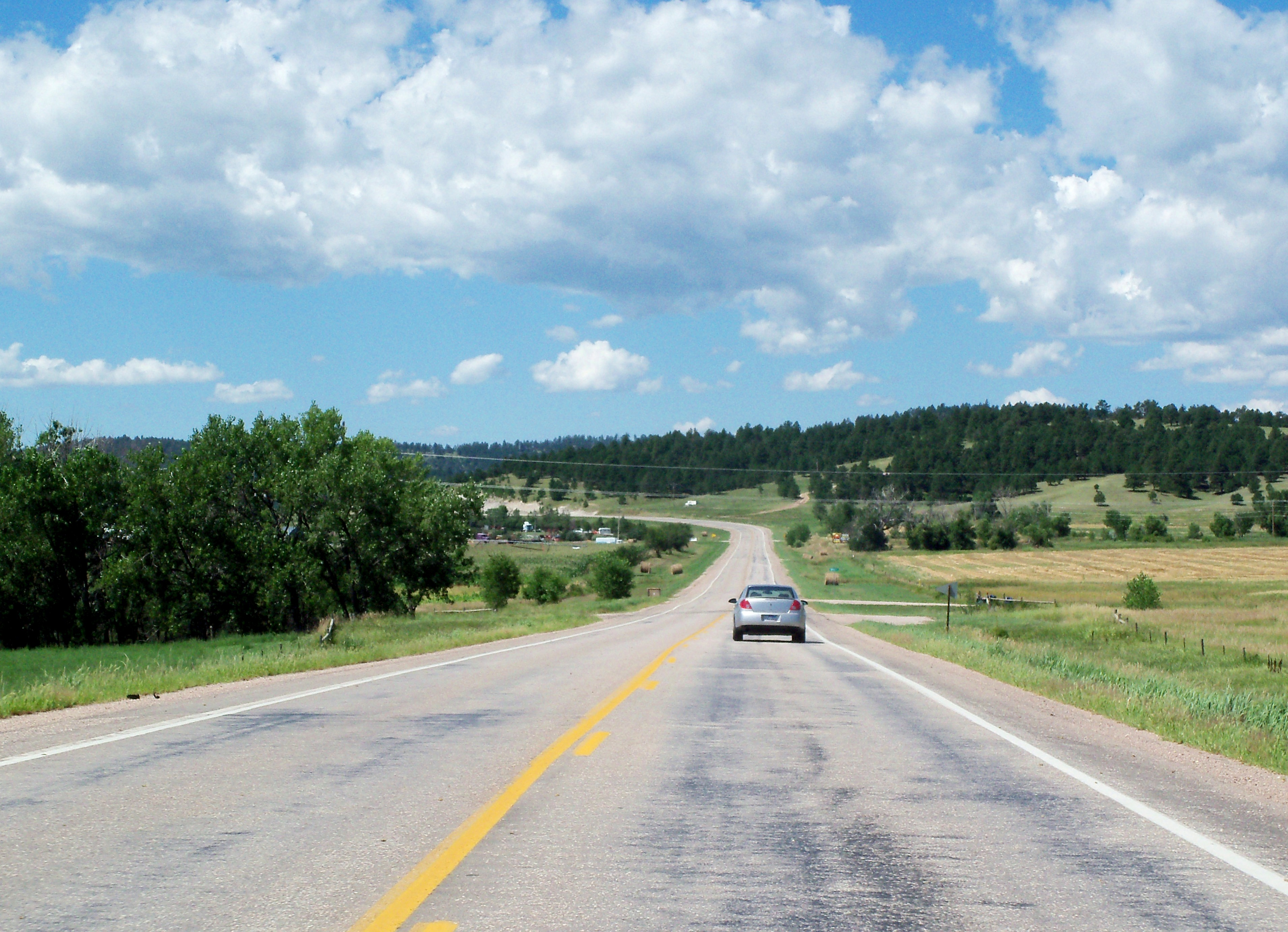
SD 40 in northeastern Custer County, east of Hermosa, August 2010

SD 40 begins at an intersection with US 16A in Keystone and heads east through the town. It crosses Battle Creek numerous times, then leaves Keystone and heads in a general southeastern direction, curving regularly. The highway crosses Iron Creek just before leaving the Black Hills National Forest and crossing Battle Creek once more. It continues southeast, leaving Pennington County and entering Custer County. In Custer County, SD 40 meets SD 79, and the two highways run northward toward Hermosa. They straddle the western limit of Hermosa for a short distance before SD 79 continues north and SD 40 splits off to the east, passing through Hermosa. East of town, SD 40 curves back to the southeast and enters the Buffalo Gap National Grassland. Finally, the route curves to the south and crosses the Cheyenne River; doing this, it leaves the Buffalo Gap National Grassland and Custer County, and enters Oglala Lakota County and the Pine Ridge Indian Reservation, becoming BIA 41.

The route of SD 40 is defined in South Dakota Codified Laws § 31-4-161.

== History ==
SD 40 was first established along the route from Rapid City to the Minnesota border southeast of Sioux Falls in 1926. The section east of near Philip was cosigned with US 16 when the U.S. Highway System was created. The SD 40 designation was dropped from the section east of Philip in 1927. SD 40 was rerouted southeast to east of Witten, replacing the part of SD 44. SD 40 became part of an extended SD 44 by 1975. SD 40 was established along its current route in 1976.

== Major intersections ==
County	Location	mi	km	Destinations	Notes
Pennington	Keystone	0.000	0.000	US 16A	Western terminus
Custer		15.585	25.082	SD 79 south	Southern end of SD 79 concurrency
Custer	Hermosa	15.895	25.581	SD 79 north	Northern end of SD 79 concurrency
Oglala Lakota	Red Shirt	37.369	60.140	BIA 41	End of state maintenance
1.000 mi = 1.609 km; 1.000 km = 0.621 mi: Concurrency terminus

== Related route ==
Highway 40A
- Location: Badlands National Park
- Length: 2 mi (3.2 km)
- Existed: 1970–1976

South Dakota Highway 40A (SD 40A) was a short spur route in the east part of Badlands National Park. This route was originally part of SD 40. At that time, SD 40 exited the park to the northeast, and continued east with US 16. Around 1970, SD 40 was rerouted south from the park to a new alignment south of the White River. When this was done, SD 40A was created to link with US 16A.

In 1976, this route was redesignated as South Dakota Highway 377.
