= Special routes of U.S. Route 16 =

Special routes of U.S. Route 16

Highway system
- United States Numbered Highway System; List; Special; Divided

At least 15 special routes of U.S. Route 16 (US 16) have existed, including four in Michigan.

== Wyoming ==
=== Newcastle business route ===
U.S. Highway 16 Business
- Location: Newcastle, Wyoming

U.S. Highway 16 Business (US 16 Bus.) in Newcastle, Wyoming, is mainline US 16 signed as a business route. It includes West Main Street east of US 16 Truck and South Summit Street east of West Main and North Summit streets.

=== Newcastle truck route ===
U.S. Highway 16 Truck
- Location: Newcastle, Wyoming
- Length: 1.7 mi (2.7 km)

U.S. Highway 16 Truck (US 16 Truck) in Newcastle, Wyoming, runs south of mainline US 16. It begins at West Main Street between Quarter Horse Drive and Sixth Avenue, directly across from Seventh Avenue, and Divide Avenue and South Summit Street.

== South Dakota ==
=== Custer–Keystone alternate route ===
U.S. Highway 16A
- Location: Custer–Keystone, South Dakota
- Length: 36.971 mi (59.499 km)

U.S. Highway 16A (US 16A) is a 36.971-mile-long (59.499 km) scenic U.S. Highway that is an alternate route for US 16. It splits from US 16 in the Black Hills of the southwestern part of the U.S. state of South Dakota. The highway's western terminus is an intersection with US 16, US 385, and South Dakota Highway 89 (SD 89) in Custer. The eastern terminus is at an interchange with US 16 called Keystone Wye south of Rapid City. Portions of US 16A are known as the Iron Mountain Road, after the mountain it summits.

=== Former Custer–Keystone alternate route ===
U.S. Highway 16A
- Location: Custer–Keystone, South Dakota
- Existed: 1949–1954

=== Hill City bypass route ===
U.S. Highway 16 Bypass
- Location: Hill City, South Dakota

=== Hill City truck route ===
U.S. Highway 16 Truck
- Location: Hill City, South Dakota

U.S. Route 16 Truck (US 16 Truck) in Hill City, South Dakota, runs east of mainline US 16/US 385 along Walnut Avenue and is also overlapped with US 385 Truck. It begins at Main Street north of Pond Court, then runs alongside the George S. Mickelson Trail. Across the street from MacGregor Street the street name changes to Railroad Avenue for the South Dakota State Railroad Museum and the former Chicago, Burlington and Quincy Railroad depot, which serves the Black Hills Central Railroad. The name Walnut Avenue is revived as "North Walnut Avenue" as US 16 Truck/US 385 Truck ends at East Main Street.

=== Rapid City business loop ===
U.S. Highway 16 Business
- Location: Rapid City, South Dakota

=== Rapid City truck route ===
U.S. Highway 16 Truck
- Location: Rapid City, South Dakota
- Length: 9.024 mi (14.523 km)

U.S. Highway 16 Bypass
- Location: Rapid City, South Dakota
- Length: 9.024 mi (14.523 km)

U.S. Highway 16 Truck (US 16 Truck) in Rapid City, South Dakota, runs from US 16 in the southern portion of the city to Interstate 90 (I-90)'s exit 61 on the city's eastern boundary. The route, recognized by the American Association of State Highway and Transportation Officials as U.S. Highway 16 Bypass (US 16 Byp.), was established in 1989, and its relocation eastward was approved in 2005. While not reflected in these records, the route is signposted along I-90 westward to I-190 and US 16 at I-90's exit 57.

=== Wall–Kadoka alternate route ===
U.S. Highway 16A
- Location: Wall–Kadoka, South Dakota
- Existed: 1980

U.S. Highway 16A (US 16A) is the former designation of SD 240, serving Badlands National Park.

== Wisconsin ==
=== Watertown business loop ===
Business U.S. Highway 16
- Location: Watertown, Wisconsin

== See also ==
- List of special routes of the United States Numbered Highway System
