= South Dakota Highway 36 =

State highway in South Dakota, United States

Highway 36

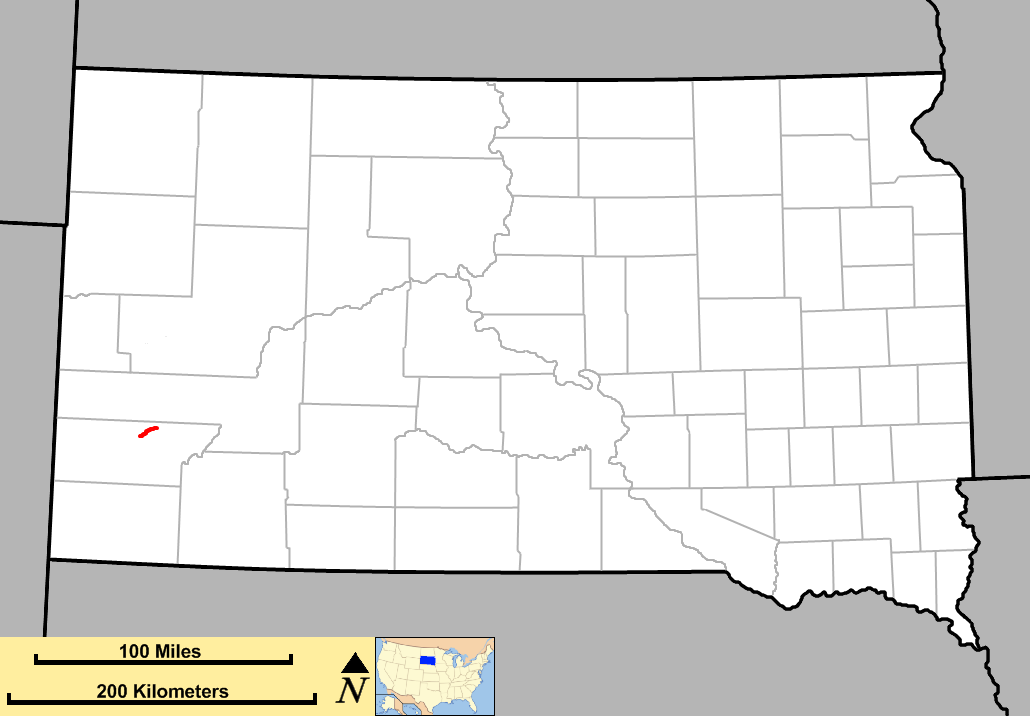
- Route of SD 36 (in red)

Route information
- Maintained by SDDOT
- Length: 9.087 mi (14.624 km)
- Existed: 1926–present

Major junctions
- West end: US 16A in Custer State Park
- East end: SD 79 near Hermosa

Location
- Country: United States
- State: South Dakota
- Counties: Custer

Highway system
- South Dakota State Trunk Highway System; Interstate; US; State
← SD 35	→ SD 37

South Dakota Highway 36 (SD 36) is an east–west state route located in southwest South Dakota. It begins at the junction of U.S. Route 16A on the eastern edge of Custer State Park, and ends at South Dakota Highway 79 just south of Hermosa. It is slightly over nine miles (14 km) in length.

== Route description ==
South Dakota Highway 36 begins at a junction with SD 79 approximately one mile south of Hermosa. From there, it travels southwest along a winding mountainous road for about 9 miles (14 km) before terminating in Custer State Park at a junction with US 16A.

== History ==
South Dakota 36 was implemented in 1926. At that time, it continued further west to the Wyoming border, utilizing the current route of US 16A to Custer, and U.S. Route 16 west of Custer; US 16 went northwest from Rapid City. The western terminus was pulled back to its present location around 1935, when US 16 was rerouted southwest through the Black Hills.

In 1933 and 1934, this route was also part of U.S. Route 216, which then continued north to Rapid City.

== Major intersections ==
The entire route is in Custer County.

Location	mi	km	Destinations	Notes
Custer State Park	0.000	0.000	US 16A	
Hermosa	9.087	14.624	SD 79	
1.000 mi = 1.609 km; 1.000 km = 0.621 mi
