= U.S. Route 16 in South Dakota =

Section of U.S. Highway in South Dakota, United States

U.S. Highway 16
- Current US 16 highlighted in red

Route information
- Maintained by SDDOT
- Length: 69.00 mi (111.04 km)
- Existed: 1926–present

Major junctions
- West end: US 16 at the Wyoming state line near Newcastle, WY
- US 385 / US 16A in Custer; US 385 in Three Forks; US 16A near Keystone; SD 44 in Rapid City
- East end: I-190 / I-90 in Rapid City

Location
- Country: United States
- State: South Dakota
- Counties: Custer, Pennington

Highway system
- United States Numbered Highway System; List; Special; Divided; South Dakota State Trunk Highway System; Interstate; US; State
← SD 15	→ SD 16

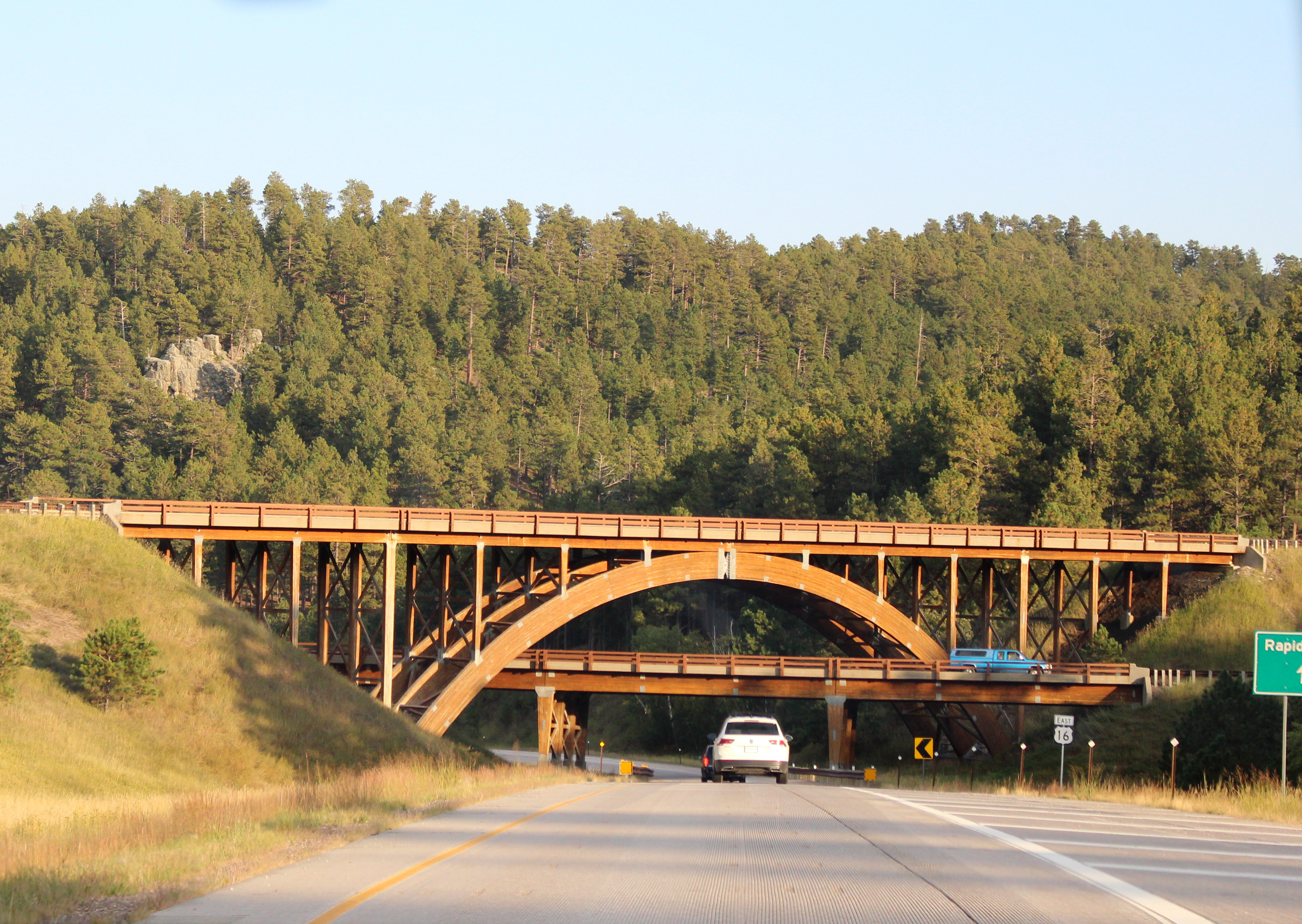
US 16 eastbound at Keystone Wye

U.S. Highway 16 (US 16) is a 69-mile-long (111 km) east–west United States Numbered Highway in the western part of the state of South Dakota. It travels between Yellowstone National Park near Newcastle, Wyoming and Interstate 90 (I-90) in Rapid City.

== Route description ==
US 16 is also known as Mount Rushmore Road in western South Dakota. The highway enters South Dakota east of Newcastle, Wyoming. It travels near Jewel Cave, the fourth-longest cave in the world. The highway goes through the city of Custer and shares alignment with US 385. East of Hill City, US 16 splits off US 385. It then becomes a four-lane divided highway, with the two roadways separated by up to 0.5 miles (0.80 km) in some places, including the old gold-mining town of Rockerville, South Dakota, which is contained entirely in the median of US 16. In Rapid City, US 16 follows Mount Rushmore Road to a concurrency with South Dakota Highway 44 (SD 44; Omaha Street) to the southern terminus of I-190. US 16 stays concurrent with I-190 until both highways end at I-90.

This section of US 16 is defined at South Dakota Codified Laws § 31-4-138.

== History ==
US 16 formerly ran all the way across the state, to the Minnesota state line east of Sioux Falls. It entered the state on the current routing of US 14/I-90 (the current routing is former US 216) and followed the US 14 routing to Rapid City. It joined US 216 in Rapid City and continued east into Box Elder. "Highway 14-16", as it was known, was a divided highway through most of Box Elder before returning to a two-lane road. (This road is still in use today, and still referred to as "14-16".) US 16 traveled east to New Underwood, then continued through the foothills to Wasta. The highway ran north of Wasta, across the Cheyenne River, then ran southeast to Wall. In Wall, an alternate route of US 16 (present day SD 240) split from the highway and headed south, through the Badlands National Monument (now Badlands National Park). US 14 and US 16 split south of Philip, with US 14 traveling due east and US 16 continuing south (following present-day SD 73 to its intersection with the eastern end of US 16 Alternate. From there, US 16 traveled due east, on the present-day routing of South Dakota Highway 248 (SD 248). The highway followed this routing through Kadoka, Murdo, and Vivian, where it intersected US 83. The highway continued east to Reliance, where present-day SD 248 ends. US 16 then returned to the current routing of I-90 and followed this routing to Oacoma, where it followed the current I-90 Business to a bridge over the Missouri River into Chamberlain. East of Chamberlain, US 16 followed present day Old Airport Road to East King Street, then turned onto 249th Street just north of where I-90 now lies. It followed 249th Street to Pukwana, present-day 350th Avenue to an intersection with SD 47 (now SD 50), 251st Street to Kimball, and 252nd Street to White Lake. US 16 then followed present-day County Road 34 (also named Old Highway 16) to Mount Vernon and present-day 254th Street to Mitchell. It then followed what is now SD 38 east to 421st Avenue, 421st Avenue to Alexandria, SD 262 to Bridgewater, and SD 42 to Sioux Falls. The highway followed Minnesota Avenue (SD 115), 6th Street, Sycamore Avenue, Madison Street, and Splitrock Boulevard (SD 11) to Brandon. It then followed present-day Aspen Boulevard (formerly South Dakota Highway 264, or SD 264) from Brandon east to the Minnesota state line north of Valley Springs.

Former extent of US 16

== Major intersections ==
County	Location	mi	km	Destinations	Notes
Custer	West Custer Township	0.00	0.00	US 16 west – Newcastle	Continuation into Wyoming
Custer	Custer	26.46	42.58	US 385 south / SD 89 south – Wind Cave National Park, Hot Springs	Western end of US 385 and SD 89 concurrencies
Custer	Custer	26.96	43.39	US 16A east / SD 89 north – Custer State Park	Eastern end of SD 89 concurrency
Pennington	West Pennington	37.49	60.33	SD 87 south (Needles Highway) / Peter Norbeck Scenic Byway – Sylvan Lake, Custer	
Pennington	West Pennington	37.69	60.66	SD 244 east / Peter Norbeck Scenic Byway – Mount Rushmore	
Pennington	Hill City	40.51	65.19	US 16 Truck east / US 385 Truck north	
Pennington	Hill City	41.06	66.08	US 16 Truck west / US 385 Truck south	
Pennington	West Pennington	45.00	72.42	US 385 north – Deadwood, Lead	Eastern end of US 385 concurrency, also known as Three Forks
Pennington	Unorganized Territory of Mount Rushmore	50.60	81.43	US 16A west – Keystone, Mount Rushmore	Directional-T interchange, also known as the Keystone Wye
Pennington	Unorganized Territory of Mount Rushmore			Rockerville	Interchange; left exits and entrances
Pennington	Rapid City	64.19	103.30	US 16 Truck – I-90	Future single-point urban interchange (SPUI)
Pennington	Rapid City			I-90 BL east (St. Joseph Street)	One way eastbound only
Pennington	Rapid City			I-90 BL west (Main Street)	One way westbound only
Pennington	Rapid City			SD 44 east (Omaha Street)	Western end of SD 44 concurrency
Pennington	Rapid City			I-190 north / SD 44 east (Omaha Street)	Eastern end of SD 44 concurrency; western end of I-190 concurrency; southern terminus of I-190
Pennington	Rapid City	69.00	111.04	I-90 / I-190 ends	Eastern terminus; eastern end of I-190 concurrency; northern terminus of I-190; trumpet interchange
1.000 mi = 1.609 km; 1.000 km = 0.621 mi: Concurrency terminus

== Related routes ==
Special routes of US 16 in South Dakota consist of an alternate route that runs from Custer to near Keystone as well as truck routes in Hill City and Rapid City and formerly included a business route in Rapid City and an alternate route between Wall and Kadoka.

=== South Dakota Highway 248 ===
Highway 248
- Location: Badlands National Park–Reliance
- Length: 117.108 mi (188.467 km)
- Existed: 1980–present

South Dakota Highway 248 (SD 248) is a state highway in the U.S. state of South Dakota. The highway travels parallel to I-90 less than one mile (1.6 km) away from it. It travels through Lyman, Jones, and Jackson counties starting near the entrance to Badlands National Park at an intersection with SD 240 (just south of exit 131 on I-90) and terminating at exit 248 of I-90 east of Reliance. SD 248 is a former routing of US 16.

Major intersections

County	Location	mi	km	Destinations	Notes
Jackson	Northwest Jackson	0.0	0.0	SD 240 (Badlands Loop) to I-90 – Interior, Badlands National Park	Western terminus
Jackson	Northwest Jackson	11.9	19.2	To I-90 / SD 73 – Philip, Wall, Badlands, Kadoka	I-90 exit 143
Jackson	Kadoka	18.9	30.4	I-90 BL west to SD 73 / I-90 – Martin	Western end of BL 90 concurrency
Jackson	Northeast Jackson	21.1	34.0	I-90 BL east to CR 4 north / I-90 – Wall, Badlands, Belvidere	I-90 exit 152; eastern end of BL 90 concurrency
Jackson	Belvidere	31.8	51.2	SD 63 (Main Street) to I-90 – Belvidere, Norris	
Jackson	Northeast Jackson	39.2	63.1	To I-90 / SD 63 – Murdo, Belvidere, Midland	I-90 exit 170
Jackson	Stamford	41.2	66.3	Stamford Road to I-90 – Murdo, Belvidere	I-90 exit 172
Jones	Grandview Township	46.4	74.7	To I-90 – Murdo, Belvidere	Unnamed gravel road; leads to I-90 exit 177
Jones	Okaton	52.2	84.0	262nd Avenue to I-90 – Murdo, Belvidere	I-90 exit 183
Jones	Central Jones	60.1– 60.3	96.7– 97.0	I-90 – Belvidere, Draper I-90 BL begins	I-90 exit 191; western end of BL 90 concurrency
Jones	Murdo	61.7	99.3	I-90 BL east to I-90 / US 83 – White River	Eastern end of BL 90 concurrency
Jones	Draper	70.2	113.0	To I-90 (CR N13)	
Jones	Mussman Township	77.3	124.4	To I-90 (CR S10)	
Lyman	Vivian	81.8	131.6	US 83 – Fort Pierre, Pierre	
Lyman	Vivian	83.4	134.2	293rd Avenue to I-90	Former BL 90
Lyman	Northwest Lyman	89.7– 90.0	144.4– 144.8	300th Avenue to I-90 – Presho, Draper	I-90 exit 220
Lyman	Presho	94.8	152.6	I-90 BL west (305th Avenue) to I-90	Western end of BL 90 concurrency
Lyman	South Lyman	95.8	154.2	I-90 BL east (Willow Street) to I-90 / US 183 south – Winner, Vivian, Kennebec	Eastern end of BL 90 concurrency; I-90 exit 226
Lyman	Kennebec	104.8	168.7	SD 273 / I-90 to SD 1806 – Kennebec	Serves as a southern continuation of SD 1806
Lyman	Lyman	111.3	179.1	321st Avenue to I-90	
Lyman	Reliance	116.5	187.5	SD 47 / Lewis and Clark Trail – Highmore, Fort Thompson, Gregory, Winner	SD 248 runs along former US 16 until this point
Lyman	Reliance	117.1	188.5	I-90 – Chamberlain, Kennebec	Eastern terminus; I-90 exit 248
1.000 mi = 1.609 km; 1.000 km = 0.621 mi: Concurrency terminus

Browse numbered routes
← SD 247	SD 248	→ SD 249

=== South Dakota Highway 264 ===
Highway 264
- Location: Brandon–Valley Springs
- Length: 6.0 mi (9.7 km)
- Existed: c. 1976–1999

South Dakota Highway 264 (SD 264) was a state highway located on a former alignment of US 16 in eastern Minnehaha County. It was created c. 1976, when the South Dakota Department of Transportation and the Minnesota Department of Transportation moved US 16 from surface streets to I-90 in the area. The route was decommissioned in 1999.

Major intersections
The entire route was in Minnehaha County.

Location	mi	km	Destinations	Notes
Brandon	0.0	0.0	SD 11	Western terminus; US 16 continued south on SD 11
Valley Springs	6.0	9.7	CSAH 4 – Beaver Creek, Luverne	Eastern terminus at state line; US 16 continued on CSAH 4
1.000 mi = 1.609 km; 1.000 km = 0.621 mi

Browse numbered routes
← SD 262	SD 264	→ SD 271
