= Three Forks, South Dakota =

- Place
- Location of Three Forks in South Dakota.
- Coordinates: 43°57′03″N 103°30′50″W
- Country: United States
- State: South Dakota
- County: Pennington
- Time zone: UTC-7 (MST)
  - Summer (DST): UTC-6 (MDT)
- Area code: 605

Three Forks
- Interactive map of Three Forks

Location
- Roads at junction: US 16 & US 385

Construction
- Maintained by: South Dakota Department of Transportation

Three Forks is an unincorporated community in Pennington County, South Dakota, United States. It lies at the intersection of U.S. Routes 16 and 385, just north of Hill City along Spring Creek. A small general store featuring fuel is open year-round; other businesses are open seasonally, including a campground, a motel, a miniature golf-course, and an ice-cream stand. The campground is the site of an annual Octoberfest event, and the area is heavily patronized during the Sturgis Motorcycle Rally in August of each year. In recent years, considerable residential development of the immediate area has swollen its population.

From Three Forks:

- East (US 16) to the Keystone Wye and Rapid City.
- North (US 385) to Sheridan Lake, Lead, and Deadwood.
- South (US 16 and US 385 multiplexed) to Hill City and Custer.

Three Forks is one of several places in the Black Hills where there are two routes indicated by highway signage directing travelers to Mount Rushmore National Memorial.

== See also ==
- Cheyenne Crossing, South Dakota
- Four Corners, Wyoming
- Four Mile, South Dakota
- Keystone Wye
- Maverick Junction, South Dakota
- Mule Creek Junction, Wyoming
- Three Forks, Montana
