= U.S. Route 16A =

Alternate highway route in South Dakota, United States

U.S. Highway 16A
- US 16A highlighted in red

Route information
- Auxiliary route of US 16
- Maintained by SDDOT
- Length: 36.971 mi (59.499 km)

Major junctions
- West end: US 16 / US 385 / SD 89 in Custer
- East end: US 16 near Keystone

Location
- Country: United States
- State: South Dakota
- Counties: Custer, Pennington

Highway system
- United States Numbered Highway System; List; Special; Divided; South Dakota State Trunk Highway System; Interstate; US; State
← US 16	→ SD 17

U.S. Highway 16A (US 16A) is a 36.971-mile (59.499 km) scenic United States Numbered Highway. It is an alternate route for US 16. It splits from US 16 in the Black Hills of the southwestern part of the U.S. state of South Dakota. The highway's western terminus is an intersection with US 16, US 385, and South Dakota Highway 89 (SD 89) in Custer. The eastern terminus is at an interchange with US 16 called Keystone Wye south of Rapid City. Portions of US 16A are known as the Iron Mountain Road, named after the peak it summits.

== Route description ==
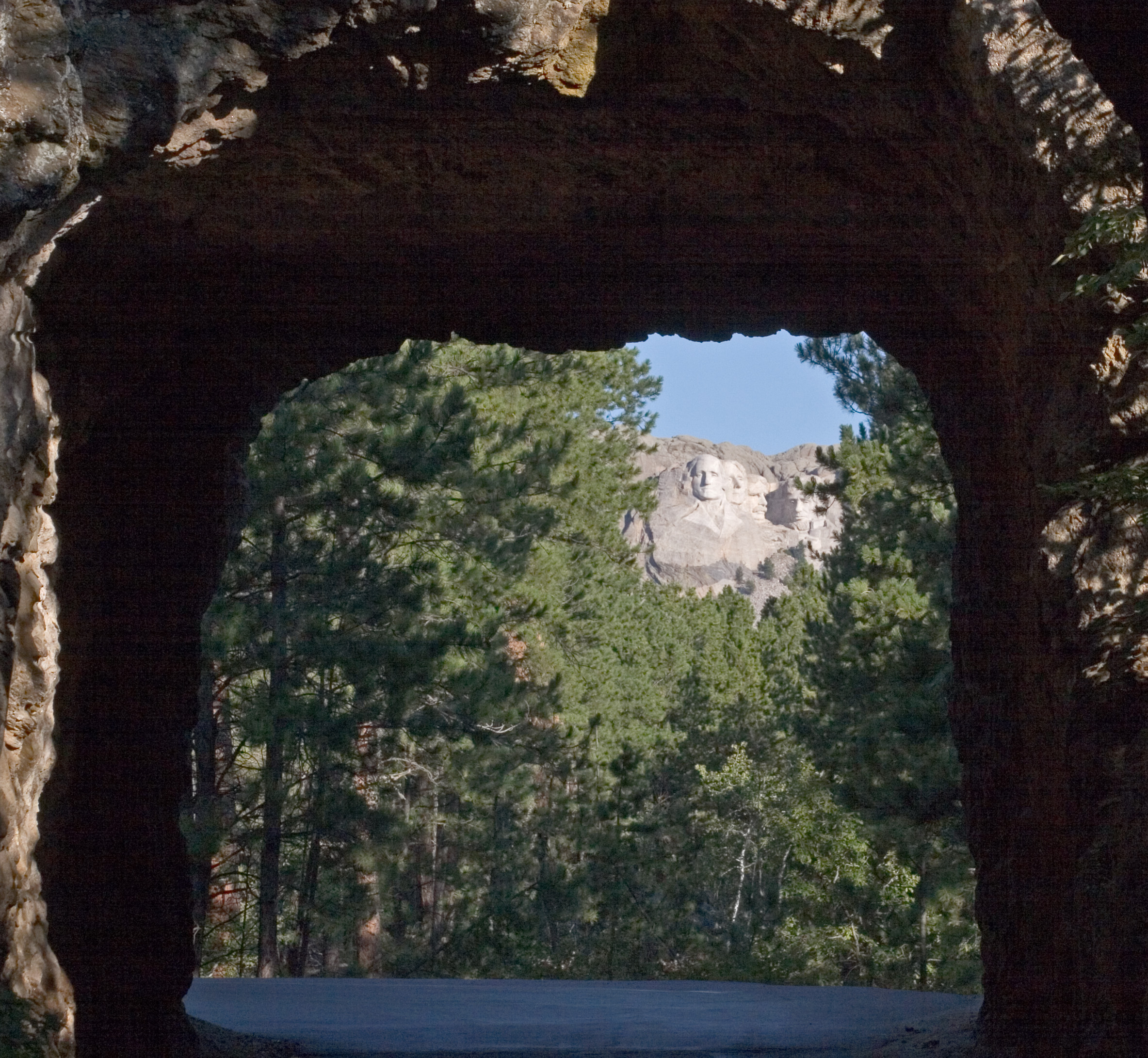
Mount Rushmore seen from the CC Gideon Tunnel on Iron Mountain Rd.

The route passes through Keystone, the Mount Rushmore National Memorial, the Norbeck Wildlife Management Area and Black Elk Wilderness within Black Hills National Forest, and Custer State Park (including State Game Lodge and Legion Lake), before rejoining the parent highway.

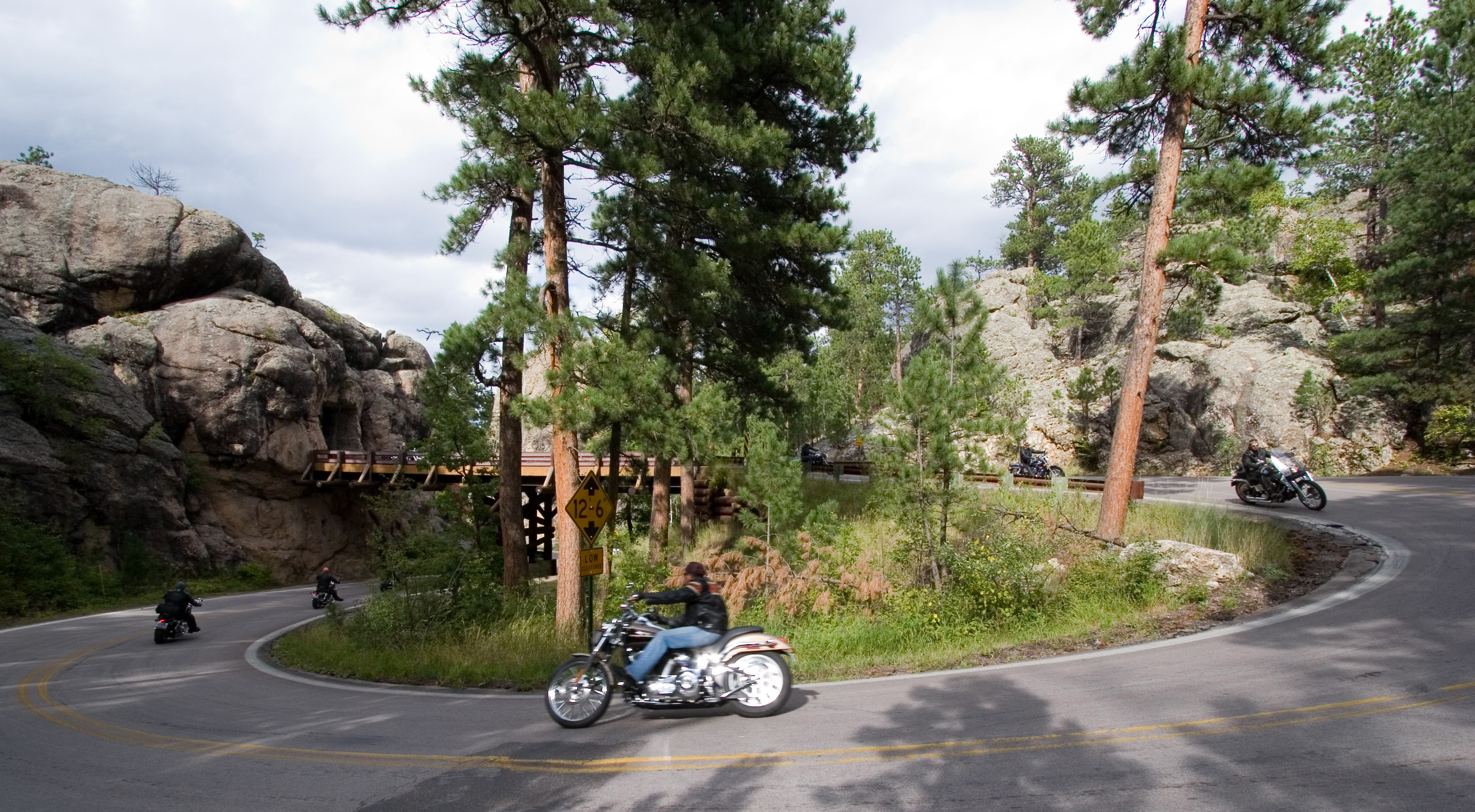
Pigtail bridge at the exit of the same tunnel

US 16A is famous for its scenic, one-lane tunnels aligned to frame the faces on Mount Rushmore, its "pigtail bridges", and its sections of divided highway but with single (and narrow) lanes on each roadway. It is the only route which can be used to drive through Custer State Park without having to pay an entrance fee for the park, provided the traveler does not stop in the park.

The route includes most of the tunnels on the South Dakota state highway system, including the only three-lane tunnel in the state, just north of Keystone. Part of the highway is also a boundary of the Black Elk Wilderness. The Iron Mountain portion of the road is not maintained in the winter. The road, like several other scenic roads in the Black Hills, was originally laid out by Governor Peter Norbeck, specifically to create a very scenic, slow-speed road for tourists. The section of US 16A from SD 89 to SD 244 is known as the Peter Norbeck Memorial Byway in honor of the governor. At the highest point of the byway, on the summit of Iron Mountain, there is a small memorial to Governor Norbeck.

== History ==
An older road through the Badlands of South Dakota (currently designated as SD 240) was designated US 16A between 1944 and 1980.

== Major intersections ==
County	Location	mi	km	Destinations	Notes
Custer	Custer	0.000	0.000	US 16 / US 385 / SD 89 south	Western terminus; western end of SD 89 concurrency
Custer	Custer	0.804	1.294	SD 89 north	Eastern end of SD 89 concurrency
Custer	Custer State Park	6.447	10.375	SD 87 south	Western end of SD 87 concurrency
Custer	Custer State Park	7.875	12.674	SD 87 north	Eastern end of SD 87 concurrency
Custer	Custer State Park	16.226	26.113	SD 36 east	Western terminus of SD 36
Pennington	Mount Rushmore	33.221	53.464	SD 244 west	Eastern terminus of SD 244
Pennington	Keystone	34.321	55.234	SD 40 east	Western terminus of SD 40
Pennington	Keystone Wye	36.971	59.499	US 16	Eastern terminus; directional-T interchange
1.000 mi = 1.609 km; 1.000 km = 0.621 mi: Concurrency terminus

== See also ==
- List of U.S. Highways in South Dakota
