= Four Mile, South Dakota =

Four Mile, South Dakota Fourmile, Moss City
- Unincorporated community
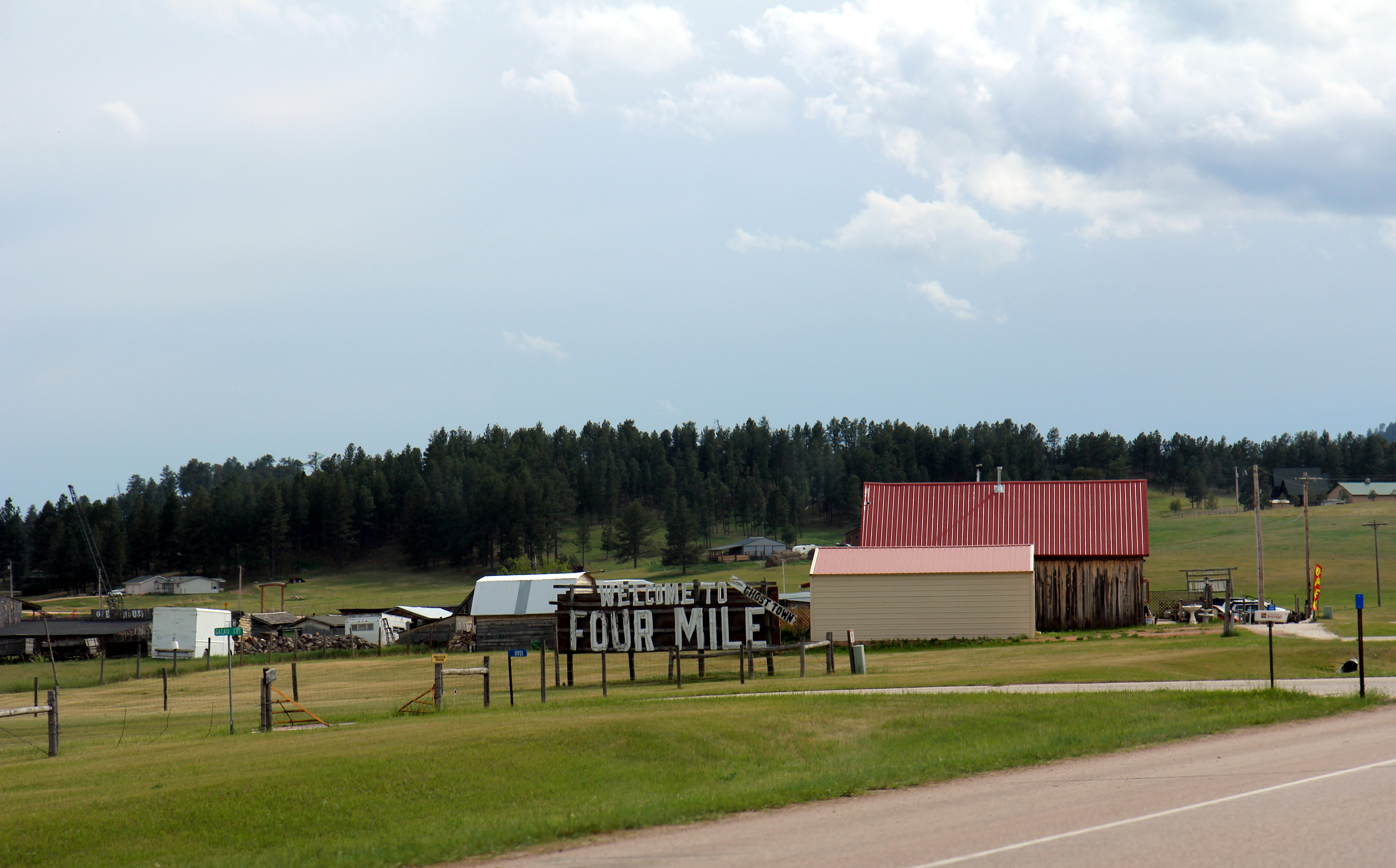
- Looking southwest at Four Mile

- Location within South Dakota Location within the United States
- Coordinates: 43°43′58″N 103°40′31″W
- Country: United States
- State: South Dakota
- County: Custer
- Elevation: 5,361 ft (1,634 m)
- Time zone: UTC-7 (MST)
  - Summer (DST): UTC-6 (MDT)
- Area code: 605
- GNIS feature ID: 1261691

Four Mile
- Interactive map of Four Mile

Location
- Roads at junction: US 16 & CR 715 (Pleasant Valley Road)

Construction
- Maintained by: South Dakota Department of Transportation

Four Mile, historically called Moss City, is an unincorporated community in Custer County, South Dakota, United States, located 4 miles (6.4 km) west of Custer at the junction of U.S. Route 16 and Pleasant Valley Road (County Highway 715).

Named because of the distance from Custer on the original Sidney Black Hills Stage Road, Four Mile today is a small bedroom community for Custer, with a single tourist attraction (the Four Mile Old West Town Museum), a log-cabin manufacturer, a small mobile home court, and several other residences.

== History ==
Four Mile got its start as a stockade camp for General George Armstrong Custer's army in the 1870s. By 1876, it had a stagecoach stop; the stagecoach company named it such simply because it was 4 miles (6.4 km) from Custer. At the time, eight people lived there, but this number quickly grew. By 1890, about 100 people had moved to Four Mile, which was temporarily renamed Moss City. A jail, store, and saloon were built.

Gold dredging took place sporadically on the nearby Four Mile Creek, in 1898 and again in 1933, but these efforts were unsuccessful. At the beginning of the 20th century, Moss City reverted to its old name of Four Mile as the population began to decline. Today, only a few buildings from the original townsite remain; others were recreated for the 1994 opening of the Four Mile Old West Town Museum.

== Geography ==
Four Mile is located at the junction of U.S. Route 16 and County Road 715 (also known as Pleasant Valley Road) in rural Custer County, South Dakota, in the Black Hills.
