= List of bridges documented by the Historic American Engineering Record in South Dakota =

This is a list of bridges documented by the Historic American Engineering Record in the U.S. state of South Dakota.

== Bridges ==
Survey No.	Name (as assigned by HAER)	Status	Type	Built	Documented	Carries	Crosses	Location	County	Coordinates
SD-1; IA-96	Sioux City Bridge (incorrect location) (Note: See also HAER No. NE-2, "Nebraska City Bridge" for additional documentation)	Demolished	Whipple truss	1888	1986	Chicago and North Western Railroad	Missouri River	North Sioux City	Union County	
SD-51	Bridge No. 50-200-035	Replaced	Lattice truss	1900	1997	474th Avenue	Big Sioux River	Dell Rapids	Minnehaha	43°47′47″N 96°43′45″W
SD-53	Beaver Creek Bridge	Extant	Reinforced concrete open-spandrel arch	1929	2000	SD 87	Beaver Creek	Hot Springs	Fall River County	43°35′03″N 103°29′21″W
SD-54	Pigtail Bridge	Extant	Steel rolled stringer	1930	2000	SD 87	SD 87	Hot Springs	Fall River County	43°36′04″N 103°29′40″W
SD-55	Wind Cave Roads and Bridges	Extant	Various		2000	Wind Cave National Park roads		Hot Springs	Fall River County	43°33′24″N 103°28′42″W
