= SD40 =

SD40 may refer to:

- Canon PowerShot SD40, a digital camera
- EMD SD40, a diesel-electric locomotive
- South Dakota Highway 40
- SD-40 alcohol, ethanol denatured by adding denatonium benzoate
- School District 40 New Westminster, a British Columbian school district for the city of New Westminster
