= South Dakota Highway 89 =

State highway in South Dakota, United States

Highway 89

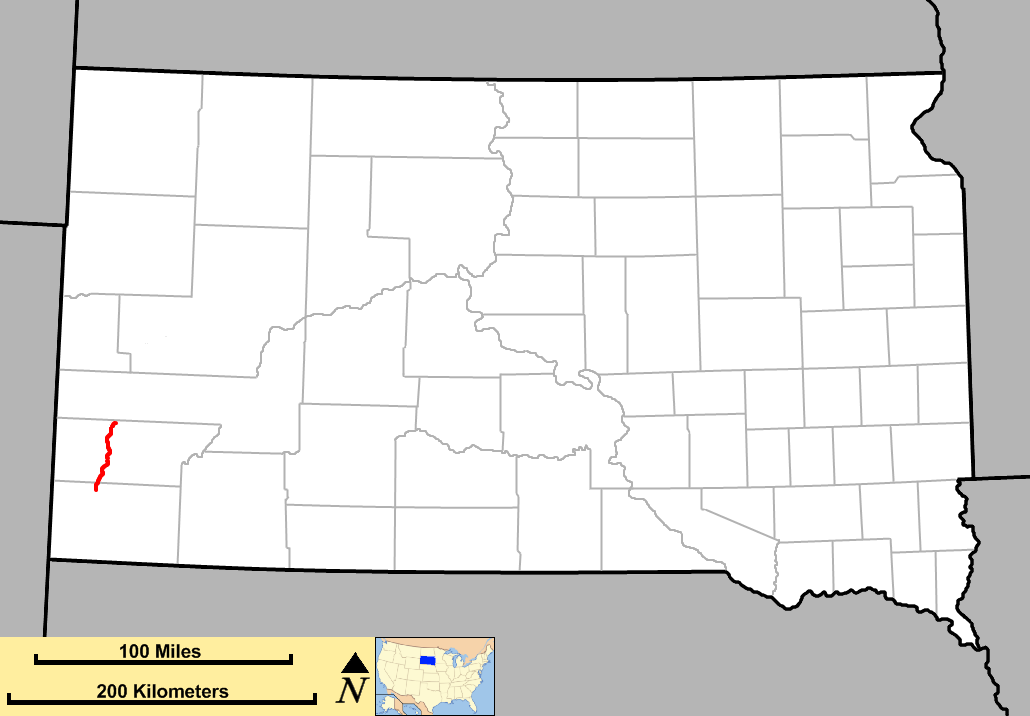
- Route of SD 89 (in red)

Route information
- Maintained by SDDOT
- Length: 34.5 mi (55.5 km)
- Existed: 1950–present

Major junctions
- South end: US 18 near Minnekahta
- US 385 in Pringle; US 16 / US 16A / US 385 in Custer
- North end: SD 87 in Custer State Park

Location
- Country: United States
- State: South Dakota
- Counties: Fall River; Custer

Highway system
- South Dakota State Trunk Highway System; Interstate; US; State
← SD 87	→ I-90

South Dakota Highway 89 (SD 89) is a 34.5-mile (55.5 km) state highway in Fall River and Custer counties in South Dakota, United States, that travels from U.S. Route 18 (US 18) near Minnekahta to SD 87 in Custer State Park. The portion of the highway from Custer to SD 87 is part of the Peter Norbeck Scenic Byway.

== Route description ==
SD 89 begins at US 18 and runs for 15.4 miles before turning north onto US 385 in Pringle where the two head north for 11.5 miles to US 16 joining the two concurrent highways in Custer. The triple concurrency lasts until entering downtown Custer where SD 89 leaves the two and joins US 16A for under a mile before turning north on the east side of Custer. There, SD 89 ends six miles later at SD 87 in Custer State Park.

== History ==
SD 89 was established in 1950 from Spearfish to Minnekahta. The section from SD 87 to Spearfish was redesignated as US 14 Alternate and U.S. Forest Service roads. The section of SD 89 from Custer to Sylvan Lake was once part of US 85 Alternate and replaced in December 1952.

== Major intersections ==
County	Location	mi	km	Destinations	Notes
Fall River		0.0	0.0	US 18 – Edgemont, Hot Springs, The Mammoth Site, George S. Mickelson Trail Burlington Route Minnekahta Trailhead	Southern terminus
Custer	Pringle	15.6	25.1	US 385 south – Hot Springs	South end of US 385 concurrency
Custer	Custer	27.2	43.8	US 16 west (Mt. Rushmore Road) – Jewel Cave Natl. Monument	South end of US 16 concurrency
Custer	Custer	27.7	44.6	US 16 east / US 385 north (North 5th Street) / US 16A begins	North end of US 16 and US 385 concurrencies; western terminus of US 16A; south end of US 16A concurrency
Custer	Custer	28.4	45.7	US 16A east – Custer State Park Stockade Lake Entrance, Legion Lake	North end of US 16A concurrency
Custer	Custer State Park	34.5	55.5	SD 87 (Needles Highway) – Park Entrance Station, Sylvan Lake, Harney Peak Trailhead, Sylvan Lake Lodge, Hill City	Northern terminus
1.000 mi = 1.609 km; 1.000 km = 0.621 mi: Concurrency terminus

== See also ==
- List of state highways in South Dakota
