= Keystone Wye =

Bridge in South Dakota

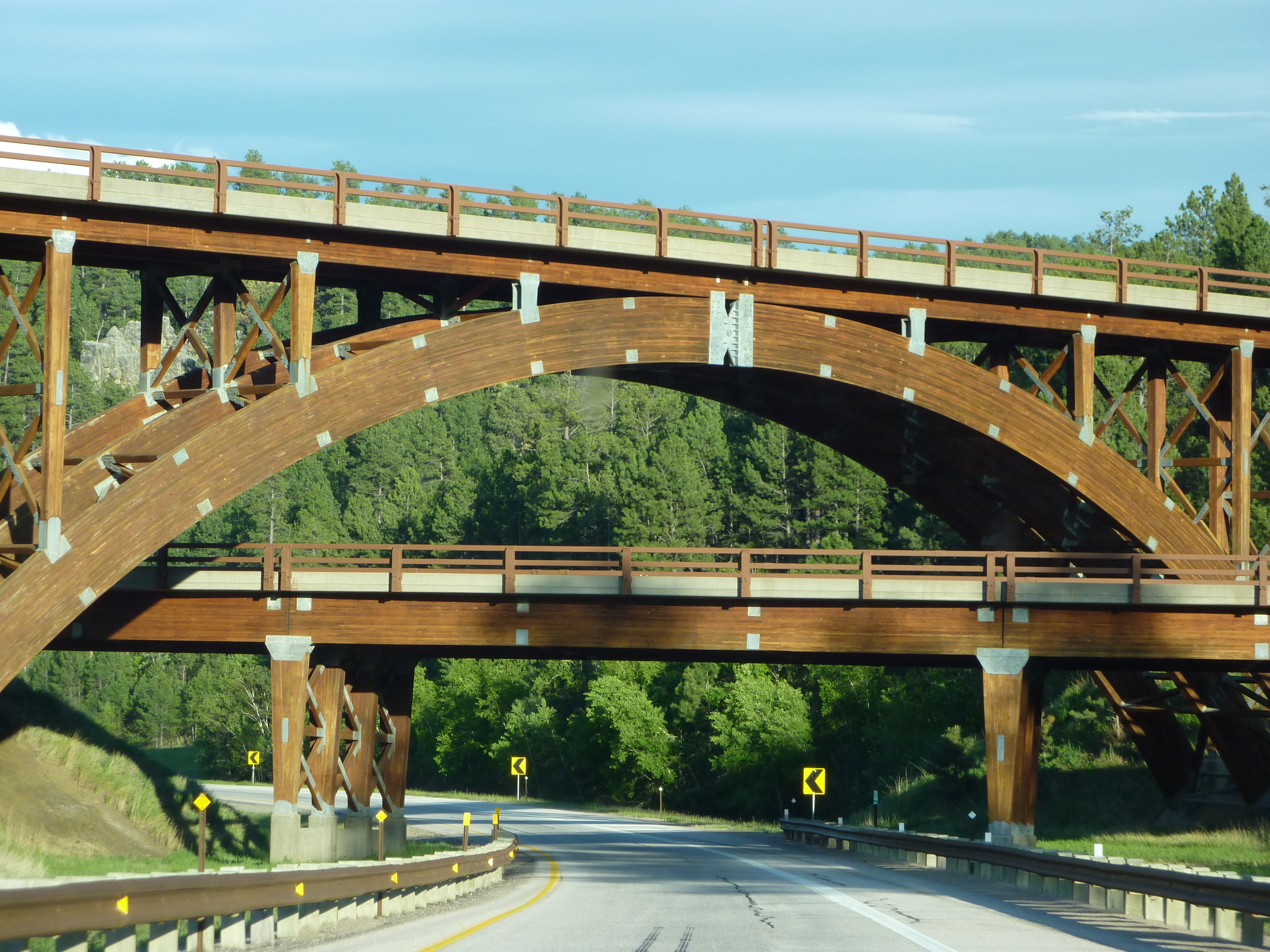
- Coordinates: 43°55′29″N 103°26′33″W
- Carries: US 16 / US 16A
- Maintained by: South Dakota Department of Transportation

Characteristics
- Material: Glued laminated timber

History
- Designer: Clyde Jundt
- Opened: 1966

Keystone Wye is an interchange of U.S. Route 16 (US 16) and US 16A located in the Black Hills of South Dakota, featuring two unique structural glued laminated timber bridges. The Keystone Wye is a three-level Directional T interchange for the two divided highways, constructed in 1967–1968 as part of a project by the South Dakota Department of Transportation (SDDOT) to convert US 16 to a four-lane highway between Rapid City and Keystone. It was designed by Clyde Jundt and Kenneth C. Wilson.

The high bridge is supported by three 20-meter (66 ft) wooden, single-hinged arches; six separate glued laminated timber pieces are used in the construction. Three more pieces were built but failed quality assurance tests; they were assembled into a pyramidal sculpture which for years was located just off US 16 on the then-south edge of Rapid City (a site today occupied by a motel and convenience store), and which was moved to a new location on US 16 near the Sitting Bull Crystal Cavern Dance Pavilion in the mid-1990s.

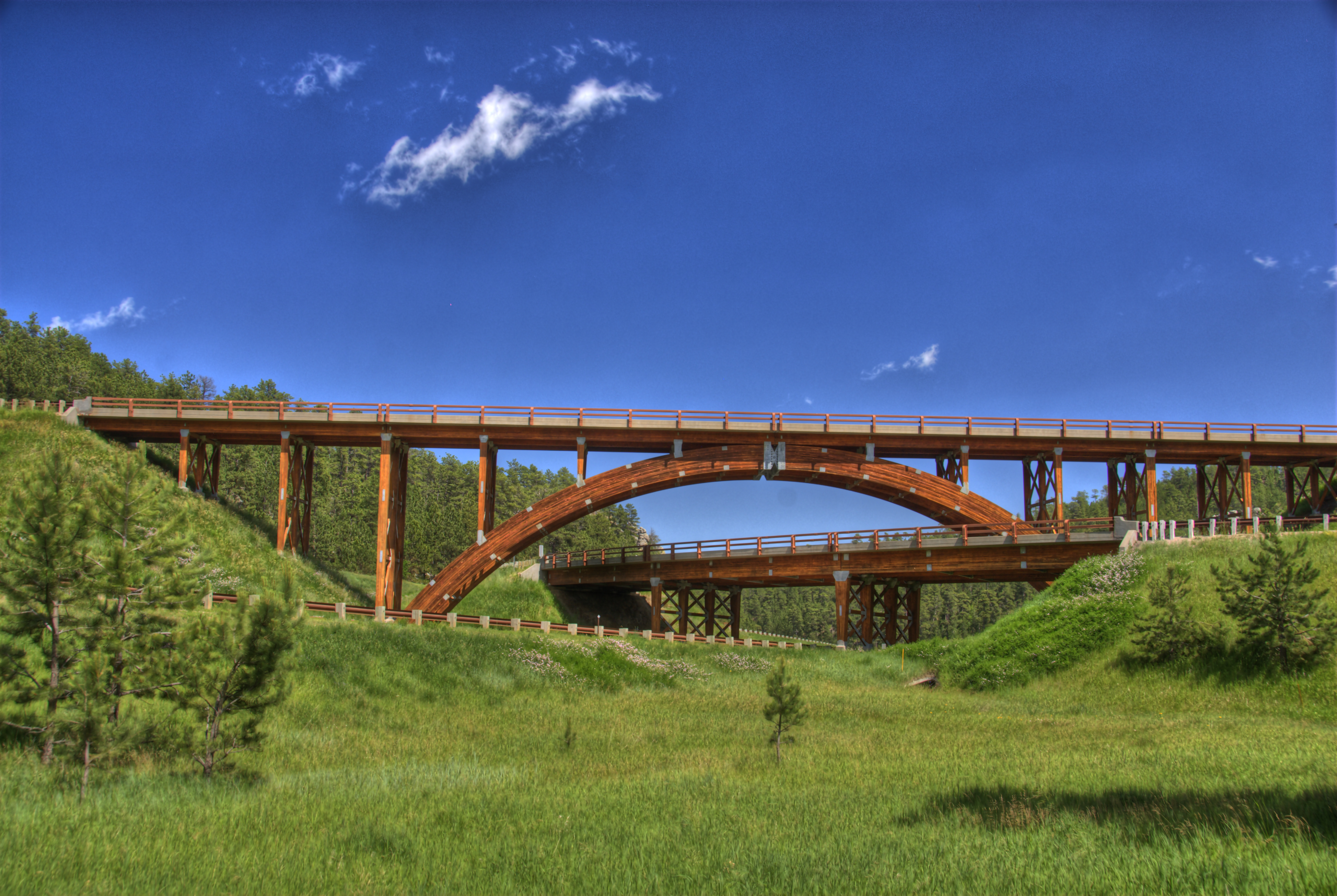
Keystone Wye from a different angle

The name "Keystone Wye" significantly predates the construction of the modern interchange and dates back to the 1930s and the construction of Mount Rushmore, when Senator and Governor Peter Norbeck laid out a series of roadways in the south-central Black Hills for tourist travel, focusing on Mount Rushmore and Harney Peak (now Black Elk Peak). The Keystone Wye includes a lay-by with historic and scenic information about the area, a SDDOT maintenance yard, and several minor roads connecting to the major highways. In the late 1980s, US 16A between the Keystone Wye and Keystone itself was widened to a four-lane undivided highway, with the single tunnel on the road expanded to accommodate the wider roadway. In the early 2000s, US 16 between the Keystone Wye and Three Forks was improved to a "Super-Two" configuration with passing lanes on most hills, although the alignment was unchanged from the 1980s realignment project which created many cutoff loops on the highway.
