= Grace Coolidge Creek =

Stream in South Dakota, United States

Coordinates: 43°49′37″N 103°13′13″W

Grace Coolidge Creek is a stream in Custer State Park, South Dakota, United States. A 5.8 mile (9.3 km) hiking trail follows the creek and ends at the Grace Coolidge Campground.

Grace Coolidge Creek has the name of First Lady Grace Coolidge, who paid a visit to South Dakota in 1927.

== See also ==
- List of rivers of South Dakota
