= Iron Mountain (South Dakota) =

Mountain in South Dakota, USA

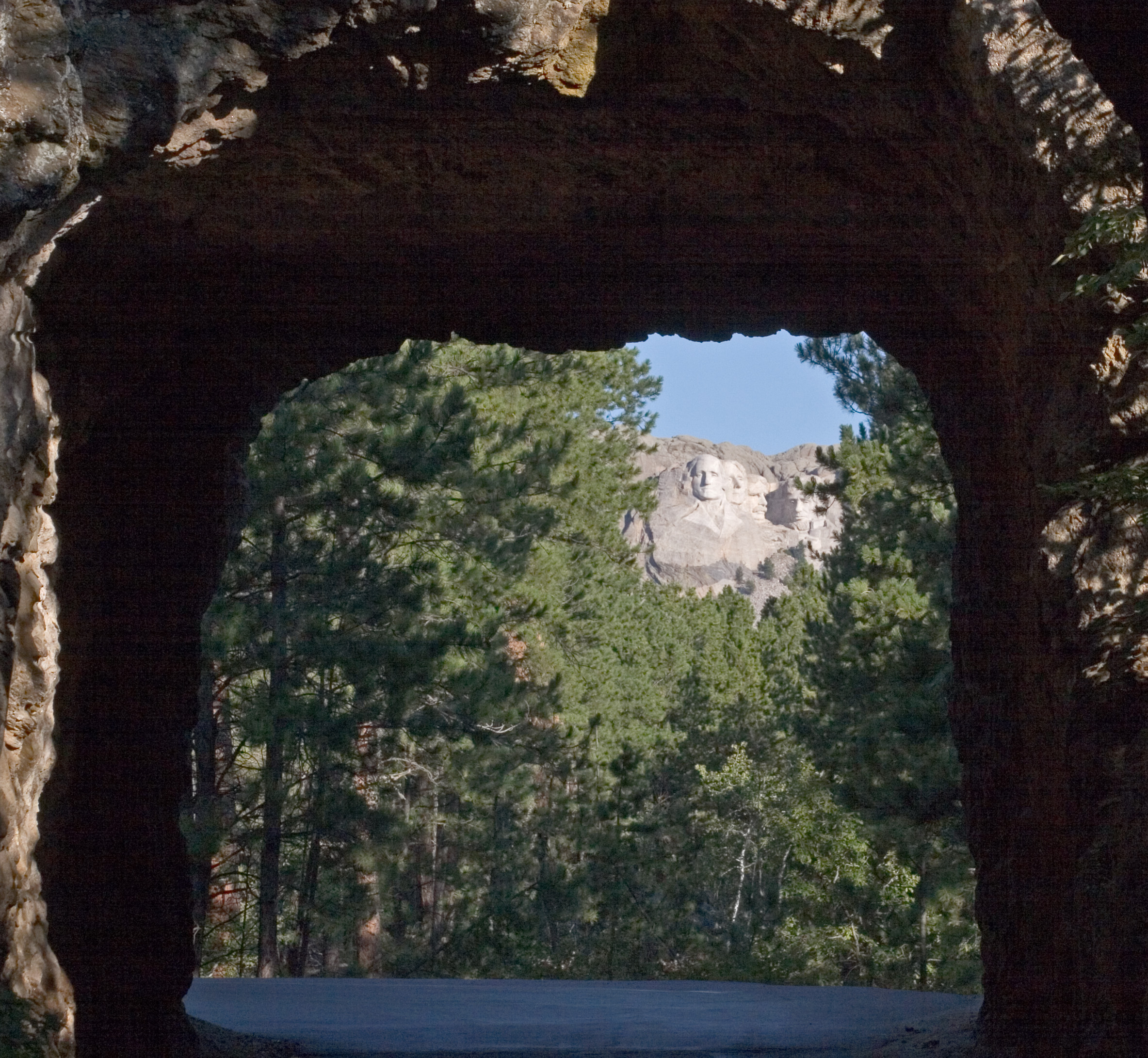
- Mt Rushmore seen from one of the tunnels on highway 16A

Highest point
- Elevation: 5,446 ft (1,660 m)
- Coordinates: 43°51′31″N 103°26′01″W

Geography
- Location within South Dakota
- Location: Pennington County, South Dakota, U.S.
- Parent range: Black Hills
- Topo map: USGS Iron Mountain

Iron Mountain is a peak in the Black Hills of South Dakota, notable for the fact that U.S. Route 16A was purposely built directly over its summit to provide scenic views of Mount Rushmore National Memorial.
