= Hermosa, South Dakota =

Hermosa, South Dakota Okíčhize Wakpá Otȟúŋwahe (Lakota)
- Town
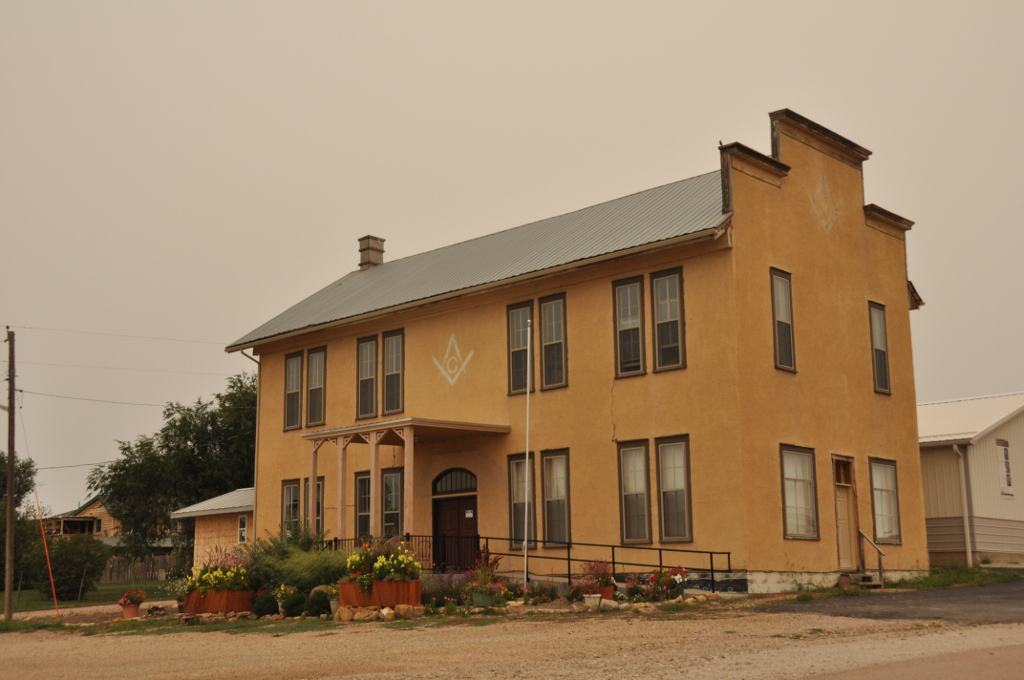
- Former Masonic Lodge, originally the town school

- Flag Seal

- Location in Custer County and the state of South Dakota
- Coordinates: 43°50′23″N 103°11′35″W
- Country: United States
- State: South Dakota
- County: Custer
- Founded: 1886

Area
  - Total: 0.48 sq mi (1.24 km^{2})
  - Land: 0.48 sq mi (1.24 km^{2})
  - Water: 0 sq mi (0.00 km^{2})
- Elevation: 3,340 ft (1,020 m)

Population (2020)
  - Total: 382
  - Density: 794.9/sq mi (306.93/km^{2})
- Time zone: UTC-7 (MST)
  - Summer (DST): UTC-6 (MDT)
- Zip Code: 57744
- Area code: 605
- FIPS code: 46-28300
- GNIS feature ID: 1267418
- Website: www.hermosasd.com

Hermosa is a town near the northern edge of Custer County, South Dakota, United States. The population was 382 at the 2020 census.

== History ==
Hermosa was developed by the Fremont, Elkhorn and Missouri Valley Railroad, later acquired by the Chicago and North Western Railway, and was platted in 1886. It was given its name, the Spanish for "beautiful", for its views of the Black Hills and the grasslands; the railroad located it a mile uphill from an existing stagecoach stop. A post office has been in operation in Hermosa since 1886.

A Titan missile silo was located near Hermosa from the early 1960s.

== Geography ==
According to the United States Census Bureau, the town has a total area of 0.48 square miles (1.24 km^{2}), all land.

== Demographics ==
Historical population
Census	Pop.	Note	%±
1890	172		—
1900	77		−55.2%
1910	114		48.1%
1920	74		−35.1%
1930	128		73.0%
1940	121		−5.5%
1950	123		1.7%
1960	126		2.4%
1970	150		19.0%
1980	251		67.3%
1990	242		−3.6%
2000	315		30.2%
2010	398		26.3%
2020	382		−4.0%
U.S. Decennial Census

=== 2010 census ===
As of the census of 2010, there were 398 people, 158 households, and 110 families living in the town. The population density was 829.2 inhabitants per square mile (320.2/km^{2}). There were 183 housing units at an average density of 381.3 per square mile (147.2/km^{2}). The racial makeup of the town was 88.7% White, 3.8% Native American, 1.0% Asian, 0.3% Pacific Islander, 0.5% from other races, and 5.8% from two or more races. Hispanic or Latino of any race were 5.3% of the population.

There were 158 households, of which 33.5% had children under the age of 18 living with them, 51.9% were married couples living together, 10.8% had a female householder with no husband present, 7.0% had a male householder with no wife present, and 30.4% were non-families. 20.9% of all households were made up of individuals, and 8.3% consisted of someone living alone who was 65 years of age or older. The average household size was 2.52 and the average family size was 2.93.

The median age in the town was 36.8 years. 25.9% of residents were under the age of 18; 7.8% were between the ages of 18 and 24; 25.3% were between 25 and 44; 29.3% were between 45 and 64; and 11.6% were 65 or older. The gender makeup of the town was 50.3% male and 49.7% female.

=== 2000 census ===
As of the census of 2000, there were 315 people, 130 households, and 82 families living in the town. The population density was 809.8 inhabitants per square mile (312.7/km^{2}). There were 139 housing units at an average density of 357.3 per square mile (138.0/km^{2}). The racial makeup of the town was 92.38% White, 1.59% African American, 3.81% Native American, 0.32% from other races, and 1.90% from two or more races. Hispanic or Latino of any race were 2.86% of the population.

There were 130 households, out of which 30.8% had children under the age of 18 living with them, 50.0% were married couples living together, 8.5% had a female householder with no husband present, and 36.2% were non-families. 28.5% of all households were made up of individuals, and 13.1% consisted of someone living alone who was 65 years of age or older. The average household size was 2.42 and the average family size was 2.98.

Of the population, 26.0% were under the age of 18, 7.0% aged between 18 and 24, 27.9% between 25 and 44, 26.0% between 45 and 64, and 13.0%, 65 or older. The median age was 37 years. For every 100 females, there were 93.3 males; among those 18 and over, for every 100 females there were 102.6 males.

The median income for a household in the town was $35,341, and the median income for a family was $37,031. Males had a median income of $29,000 versus $16,750 for females. The per capita income for the town was $13,147. About 8.0% of families and 9.1% of the population were below the poverty line, including 11.8% of those under age 18 and 8.6% of those 65 or over.

== Education ==
Hermosa has an elementary school serving students through 8th grade; most continue their schooling in Rapid City. The first school opened in 1886. It was replaced in 1889 by a two-story building with a bell tower, which in 1926 was condemned as structurally unsound, but was purchased, moved, and stabilized by the Freemasons, who used it as their lodge until 2000; it has since become a museum, arts venue, and community hall under the Hermosa Arts and History Association.

== Economics ==
Tin has been mined near Hermosa, with the ore transported via the railroad, and the town was also a railhead for cattle ranching. Since the opening of Custer State Park in 1919, Hermosa has also been a recreational gateway to the Black Hills. The Custer County Fairground is in the town. There is a small downtown business district clustered around U.S. Route 79. Lintz Brothers pizza, originally in the Mount Rushmore Telephone Company building, and Roy's Drive-in, with two 80-foot (24 m) digital screens, attract out-of-towners as well as locals.

== Notable residents ==
- Gutzon Borglum, lived on a ranch in Hermosa during work on Mount Rushmore
- Bower family, subjects of the Disney film The One and Only, Genuine, Original Family Band
- Linda Hasselstrom, rancher and author

== See also ==
- List of towns in South Dakota
