= South Dakota Highway 87 =

State highway in South Dakota, United States

Highway 87

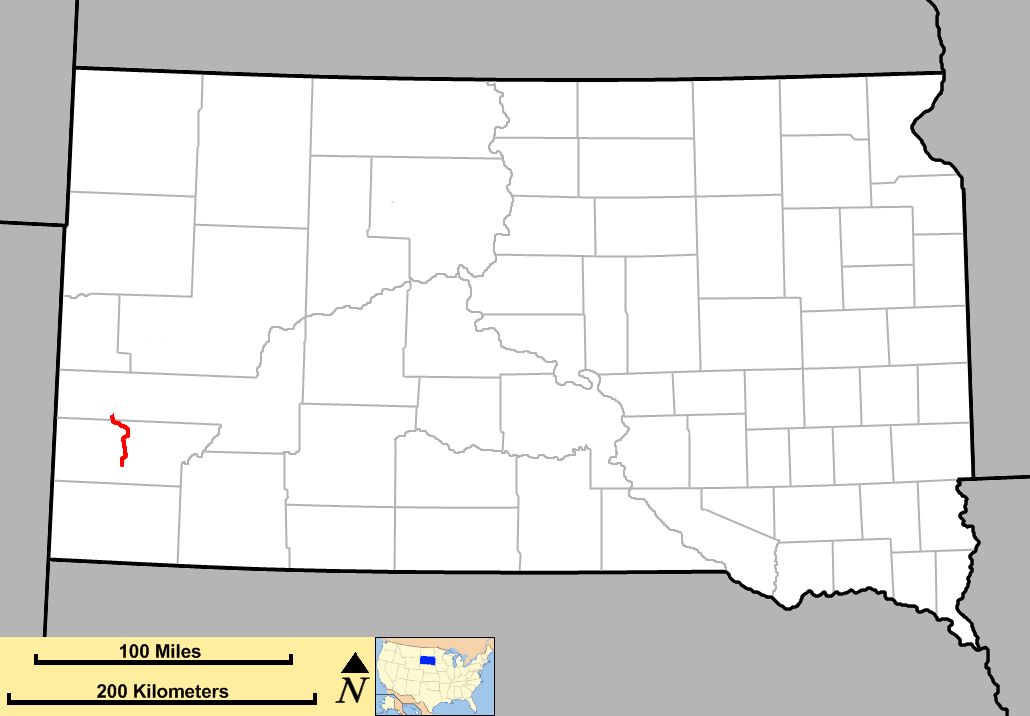
- Route of SD 87 (in red)

Route information
- Maintained by SDDOT
- Length: 37.894 mi (60.984 km)
- Restrictions: Closed in winter

Major junctions
- South end: US 385 southeast of Pringle
- North end: US 16 / US 385 near Hill City

Location
- Country: United States
- State: South Dakota
- Counties: Custer, Pennington

Highway system
- South Dakota State Trunk Highway System; Interstate; US; State
← US 85	→ SD 89

South Dakota Highway 87 (SD 87) is a 37.894-mile-long (60.984 km) state highway in the southwestern part of the U.S. state of South Dakota. It travels through the Black Hills region. The highway's southern terminus is at an intersection with U.S. Route 385 (US 385), about 6 miles (9.7 km) southeast of Pringle, within the southwestern part of Wind Cave National Park. Its northern terminus is at an intersection with US 16/US 385 about 3 miles (4.8 km) south-southwest of Hill City, within the east-central part of the Black Hills National Forest.

The highway travels through Wind Cave National Park. The northern 14 miles (23 km) of the highway is also known as the Needles Highway. The Needles Highway, along with the concurrency with US 16A, are also part of the Peter Norbeck Scenic Byway. Portions of the highway are also a section of Custer State Park's Wildlife Loop.

== Route description ==
Because of the highway's mountainous, curving nature, it is closed during the winter.

=== South of US 16A ===
Highway 87 begins at US 385 in Wind Cave National Park, east of Pringle and west of the park headquarters. North of US 385, the route crosses Cold Spring Creek and provides access to the upstream Lake Norbeck, named after Senator Peter Norbeck, instrumental in establishing several of the national and state parks in the Black Hills. From the start, SD 87 is a very twisting and winding route, with a 180° hairpin turn only a one-half mile (800 m) from the southern end. This results in the route taking a westerly track, though it eventually turns back north and crosses Beaver Creek. Three miles (4.8 km) into the route, it bridges itself and executes a 270° turn.

The route enters Custer State Park one mile (1.6 km) north of US 385. Unless you travel the 16A route non-stop, admission to the park requires an entrance license; as of 2022, for a 1 to 7day pass the fee is $20 per vehicle, an annual park entrance license is $36. Highway 87 then becomes part of the park's Wildlife Loop, and runs through the town of Blue Bell.

At milepost 17.180 (27.649 km), Highway 87 intersects U.S. Route 16A. From this point onward, the road is part of the Peter Norbeck Scenic Byway. The two routes form a concurrency and proceed east, passing Legion Lake. The roads split after just under 1.5 miles (2.4 km).

=== Needles Highway ===
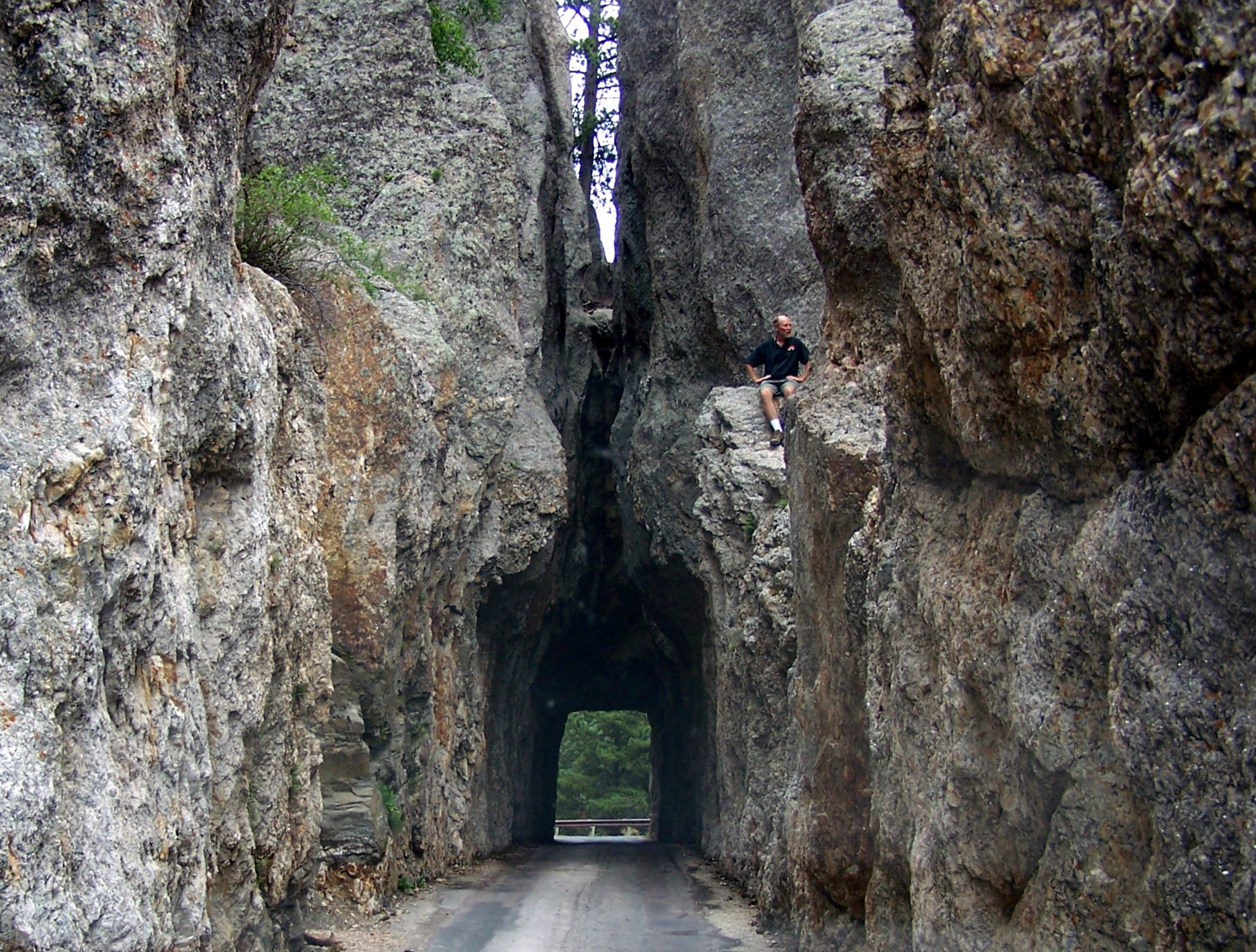
The Needles Eye Tunnel

After splitting from US 16A, the route is known as the Needles Highway. This segment is 14 miles (23 km) long. Finished in 1922, the highway is named after the high granite "needles" it winds among. The portion of the Needles Highway between the intersection with SD 89 and the intersection with US-16A runs through Custer State Park, and requires an annual South Dakota park license granting access to all state parks, recreation areas and lakeside use areas. Along this stretch lies the Black Hills Playhouse. The highway passes through two tunnels blasted through sheer granite walls — Iron Creek Tunnel and Needles Eye Tunnel. That part of the road is almost exclusively used by sightseers.

Just after Needles Eye Tunnel, Highway 87 serves as the northern terminus of SD 89. After this junction, SD 87 has one more tunnel, Hood Tunnel. It then provides access to the Sylvan Lake Resort. The route finally ends at US 16/385 south of Hill City.

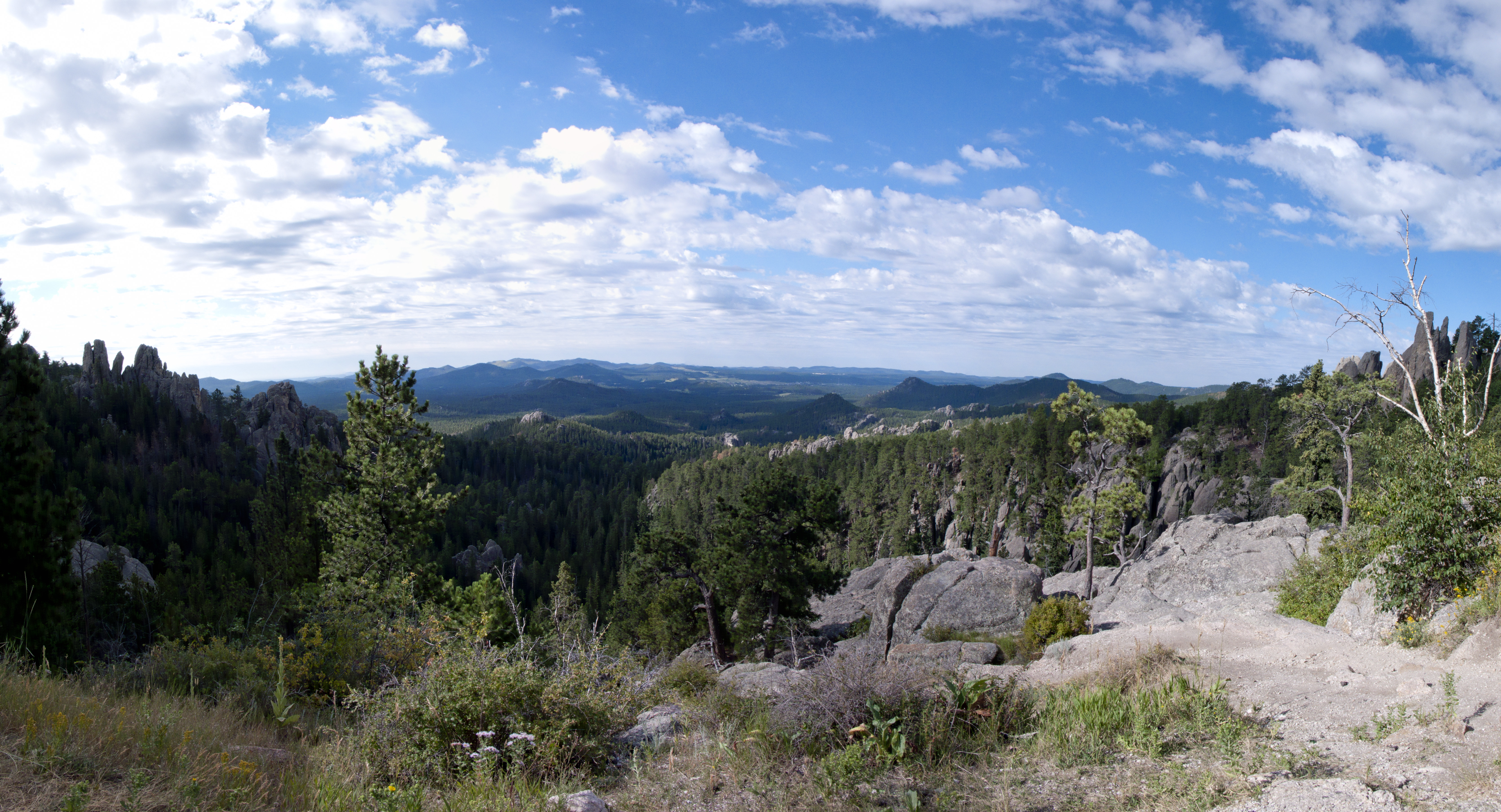
An overlook on Needles highway

== Major intersections ==
County	Location	mi	km	Destinations	Notes
Custer	Wind Cave National Park	0.000	0.000	US 385 – Wind Cave, Hot Springs, Custer, Jewel Cave	Southern terminus
Custer	Custer State Park	17.810	28.662	US 16A west – Stockade Lake, Custer, Jewel Cave Nat'l Mon.	Southern end of US 16A concurrency
Custer	Custer State Park	19.298	31.057	US 16A east – Visitor Center, State Game Lodge, Mount Rushmore	Northern end of US 16A concurrency
Custer	Custer State Park	19.298	31.057	Needles Highway South Entrance; Custer State Park fees required	
Custer	Custer State Park	25.1	40.4	Northbound road closure gate (closed winters)	
Custer	Custer State Park	31.6	50.9	Southbound road closure gate (closed winters)	
Custer	Custer State Park	31.8	51.2	Sylvan Lake Entrance; Custer State Park fees required	
Custer	Custer State Park	31.929	51.385	SD 89 south (Sylvan Lake Road) – Custer	Northern terminus of SD 89
Pennington	Custer State Park	37.894	60.984	US 16 / US 385 – Crazy Horse, Hill City, Mount Rushmore, Jewel Cave, Wind Cave	Northern terminus
1.000 mi = 1.609 km; 1.000 km = 0.621 mi: Closed/former; Concurrency terminus; Tolled

== See also ==
- The Needles
