= List of U.S. Highways in South Dakota =

- Standard South Dakota highway shields

System information
- Notes: South Dakota highways are generally state-maintained.

Highway names
- Interstates: Interstate X (I-X)
- US Highways: U.S. Highway X (US X)
- State: (State) Highway X (SD X)

System links
- South Dakota State Trunk Highway System; Interstate; US; State

The U.S. Highways in South Dakota are the segments of the United States Numbered Highway System owned and maintained by the South Dakota Department of Transportation in the US state of South Dakota.

== List ==
Number	Length (mi)	Length (km)	Southern or western terminus	Northern or eastern terminus	Formed	Removed	Notes
US 12	319.24	513.77	US 12 near Lemmon	US 12 at Big Stone City	1926	current	
US 14	439.75	707.71	I-90/US 14 near Spearfish	US 14 near Elkton	1925	current	
US 16	69	111	US 16 near Mount Rushmore	I-90/I-190/US 14 in Rapid City	1925	current	
US 18	451.88	727.23	US 18 near Edgemont	US 18 near Canton	1926	current	
US 77	—	—	—	—	1929	1982	
US 81	—	—	US 81 at Yankton	I-29/US 81 near New Effington	1926	current	
US 83	240.36	386.82	US 83 near Olsonville	US 83 near Herreid	1926	current	
US 85	154	248	US 85 in the Black Hills region	US 85 near Ludlow	1926	current	
US 85E	—	—	—	—	1931	1937	
US 183	75.17	120.97	US 183 near Wewela	I-90 near Presho	1926	current	
US 212	412.45	663.77	US 212 near Belle Fourche	US 212 east of Watertown	1925	current	
US 216	—	—	—	—	1933	1934	
US 281	—	—	US 281 in Gregory County	US 281 north of Frederick	1926	current	
US 385	122	196	US 385 south of Oelrichs	US 85 in Deadwood	1925	current	
Former

== Special routes ==
Number	Length (mi)	Length (km)	Southern or western terminus	Northern or eastern terminus	Formed	Removed	Notes
US 14A	—	—	I-90 / I-90 Bus. / US 14 / US 85 in Spearfish	I-90 / I-90 Bus. / US 14 / SD 34 / SD 79 in Sturgis	—	—	
US 16A	36.971	59.499	US 16/US 385/SD 89 in Custer	US 16 near Keystone	—	—	
US 85A	—	—	—	—	—	—	
Former
