= Custer State Park =

State park in South Dakota, United States

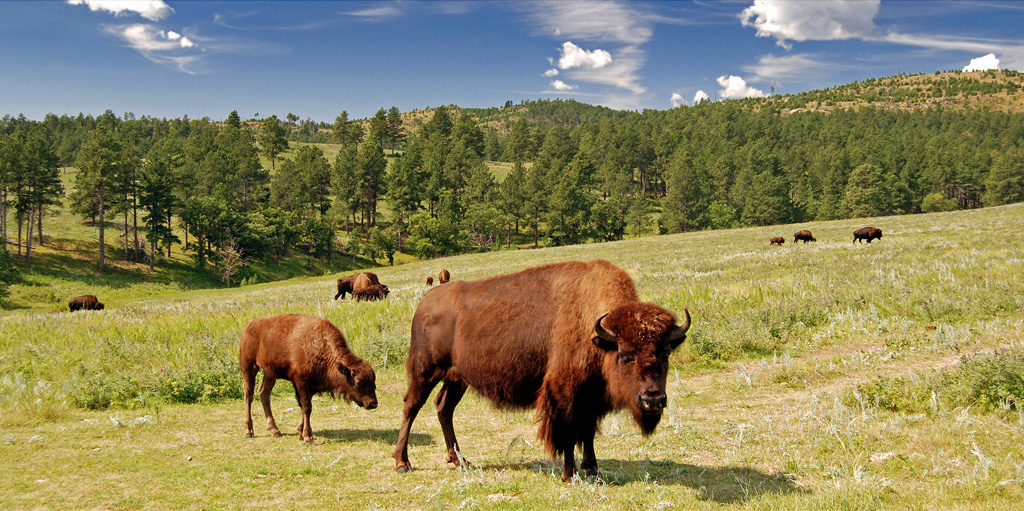
- American bison at the Wildlife Loop Road

- Location within South Dakota
- Location: Custer County, South Dakota, United States
- Coordinates: 43°36′52″N 103°41′20″W
- Area: 71,000 acres (29,000 ha)
- Elevation: 4,721 ft (1,439 m)
- Established: 1912
- Administrator: South Dakota Department of Game, Fish and Parks
- Named for: George Armstrong Custer
- Website: Official website

Custer State Park is a South Dakota State Park and wildlife reserve in the Black Hills of the United States. Located in Custer County, the park is South Dakota's first and largest state park, named after Lieutenant Colonel George Armstrong Custer. The park covers an area of over 71,000 acres (287 km^{2}) of varied terrain including rolling prairie grasslands and rugged mountains.

The park is home to a herd of 1,400 bison. Elk, coyotes, bob cats, mule deer, white tailed deer, mountain goats, prairie dogs, bighorn sheep, river otters, pronghorn, cougars, and feral burros also inhabit the park. The park is known for its scenery, hiking (including the South Dakota Centennial Trail), its scenic drives (Needles Highway and the wildlife loop), with views of the bison herd and prairie dog towns. This park is easily accessible by road from Rapid City. Other nearby attractions are Wind Cave National Park, Mount Rushmore, Jewel Cave National Monument, the Crazy Horse Memorial, and Badlands National Park.

== History ==
The area originally started out as sixteen sections, but was later changed into one block of land because of the challenges of the terrain. The park began to grow rapidly in the 1920s and gained new land. During the 1930s the Civilian Conservation Corps built miles of roads, laid out parks and campgrounds, and built three dams that set up a future of water recreation at the park. In 1964 an additional 22,900 acres (93 km^{2}) were added to the park.

== Bison herd ==
Thirty-six bison were bought in 1914 to begin a herd, creating one of the earliest public efforts to preserve the species The herd thrived in the Black Hills. Over the following decades, Custers population grew so successfully that the park had to develop a management system to keep the herd healthy and prevent overgrazing on the native grasses. By the early 1940's, the herd had grown up to 2,500 bison. Surplus bison were sold or transferred to ranchers, parks, and conservation programs around the country. Those animals became the foundation for many modern bison herds across the USA. The park has an annual bison roundup as 400 to 500 calves are born each year. The official Bison roundup started in 1965. Each fall, cowboys and cowgirls gather the herd to evaluate animal health, vaccinate calves, collect data, and select animals for removal so the herd remains balanced with the available grassland. There is a yearly auction where several hundred are sold so that the remaining number of animals will be compatible with the rangeland forage.

The annual roundups viewing crowd have grown to 16,000 to 20,000 people. South Dakota Governor Kristi Noem, a horseback rider, has taken part in the roundup which involves 50 to 60 riders herding the animals over a five-mile trail (8.0 km). Calves are branded. Their genetics can be used to improve the health of other herds.

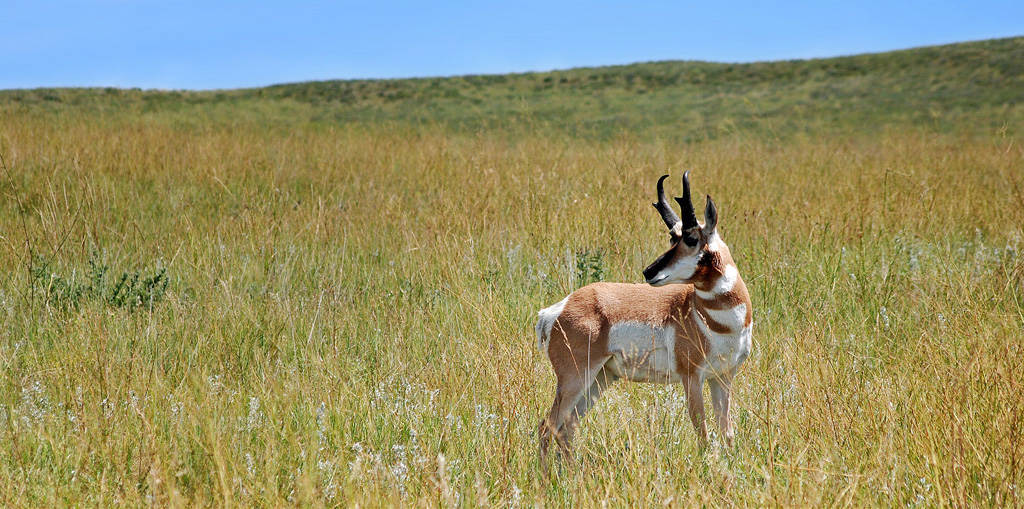
Pronghorn at the Wildlife loop road

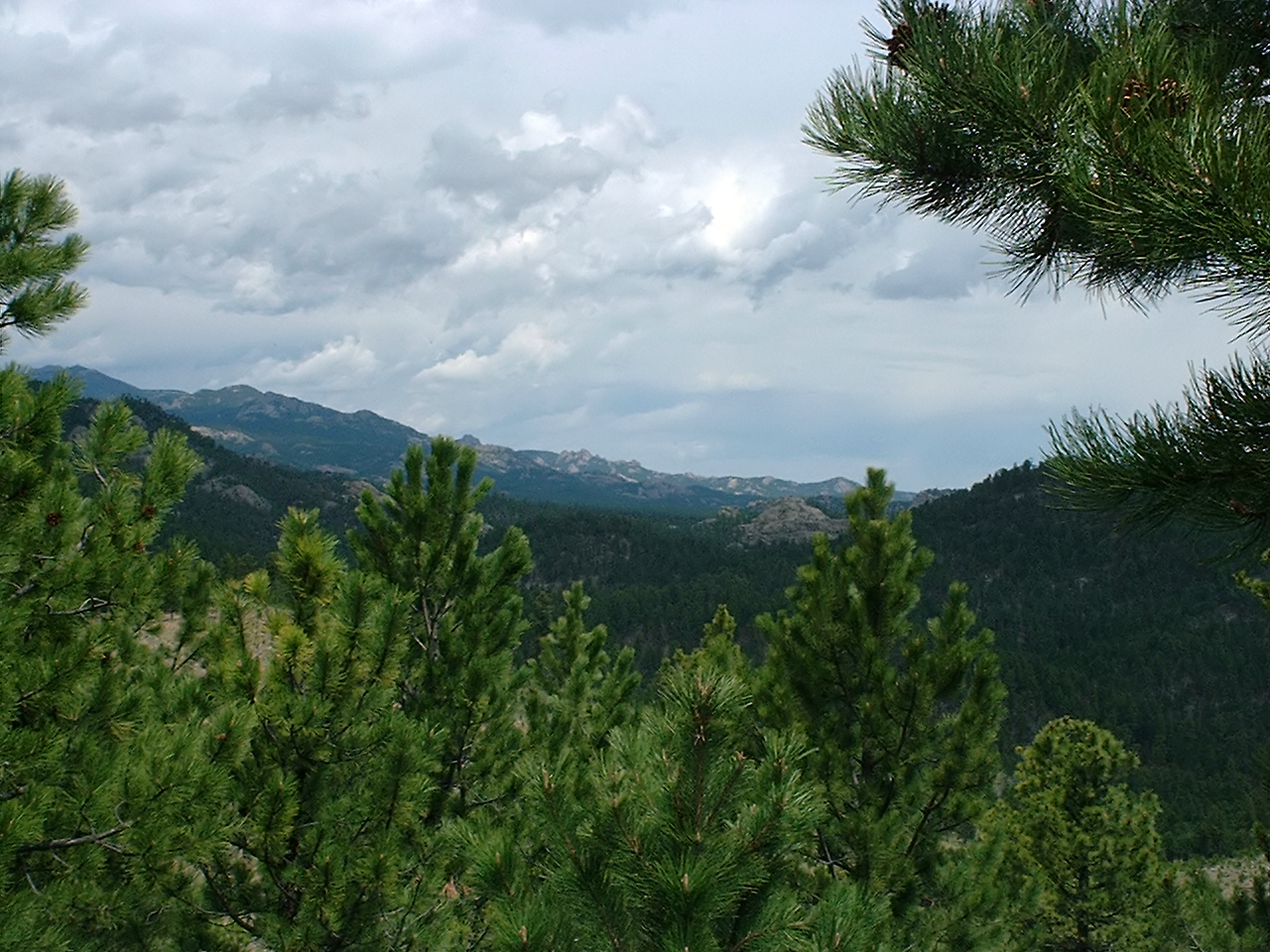
Black Hills in Custer State Park

== Museums ==
The Peter Norbeck Center is listed on the National Register of Historic Places, and is located on U.S. Route 16A in Custer. Exhibits focus on the park's natural history and cultural heritage, and include wildlife dioramas, a CCC bunkhouse and a gold prospecting display. The center is named for South Dakota Governor and Senator Peter Norbeck. Many of the park's naturalist programs begin at the center.

Badger Hole, also known as Badger Clark Historical Site, was the home of Charles Badger Clark (1883–1957), who was named South Dakota's first Poet Laureate in 1937 and was noted for his cowboy poetry. The house is maintained as it was when Clark lived there. Visitors can tour the home and hike the adjacent Badger Clark Historic Trail.

Opened in May 2016, Custer State Park's visitor center has information on the animals of the park, as well as a 20-minute film detailing the history and layout of the park.

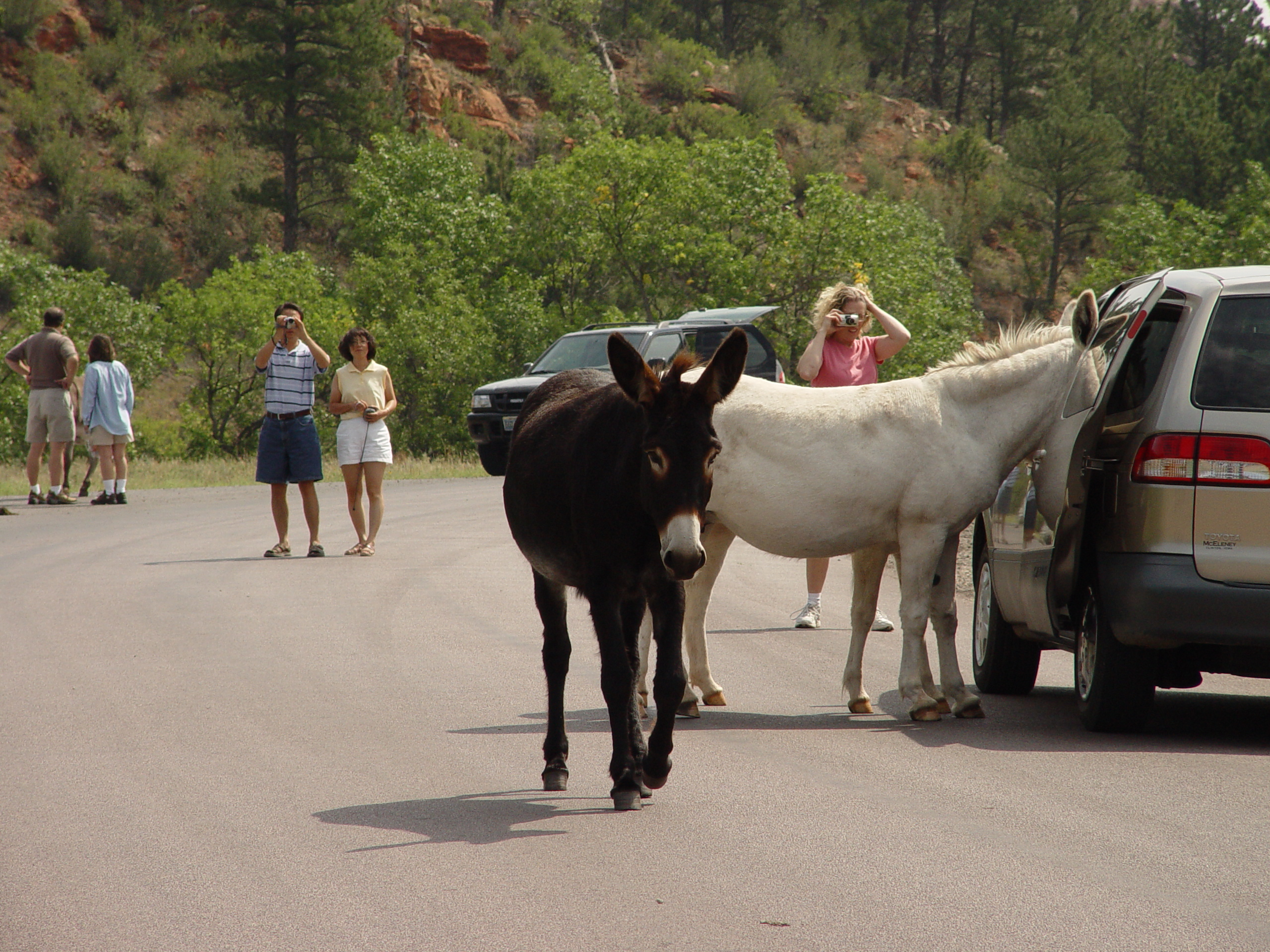
Begging Burros

== In popular culture ==
Movies filmed in Custer State Park, include The Last Hunt (1956), How the West Was Won (1962) and A Man Called Horse (1970).

U.S. President Calvin Coolidge and his wife Grace vacationed at Custer State Park for several weeks during the summer of 1927. Grace Coolidge Creek and its surrounding campground and trail are named in honor of the visit. In nearby Rapid City, where he had his summer office, Coolidge announced to assembled reporters, "I do not choose to run" for reelection in 1928.

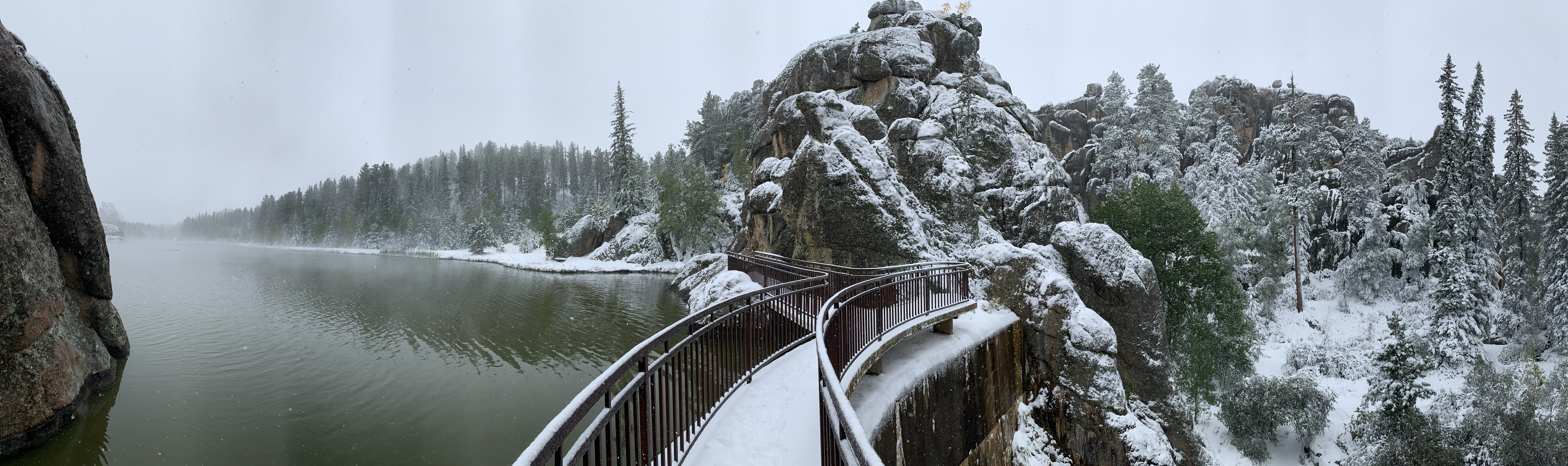
Sylvan Lake at Custer State Park

== See also ==
- Conservation of American bison
- List of protected grasslands of North America
- List of South Dakota state parks
- Civilian Conservation Corps South Dakota
