= Keystone, South Dakota =

- City
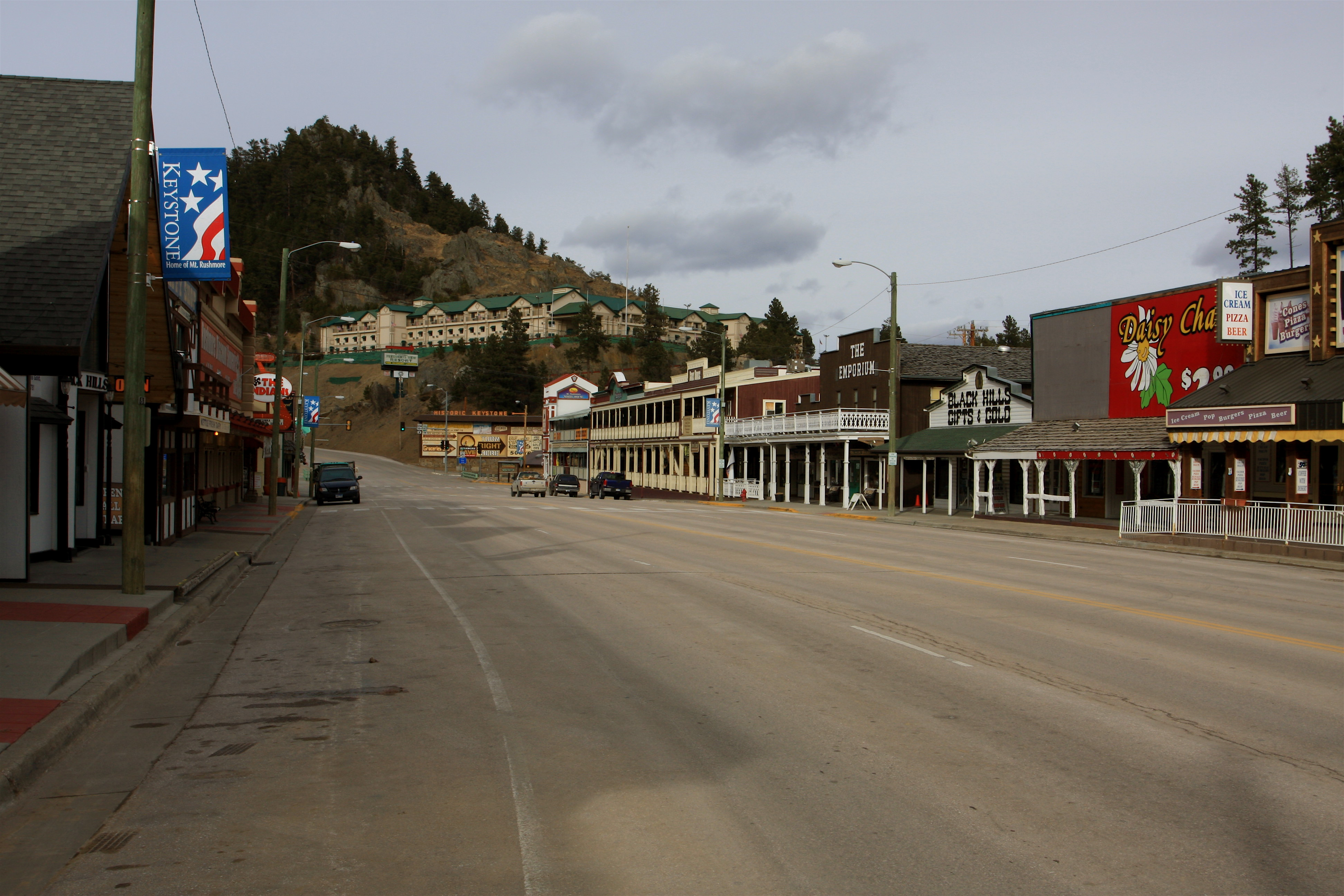
- Business district in Keystone (March 2012)
- Motto: "Home of Mount Rushmore"
- Location in Pennington County and the state of South Dakota
- Coordinates: 43°53′36″N 103°25′32″W
- Country: United States
- State: South Dakota
- County: Pennington

Area
  - Total: 3.00 sq mi (7.77 km^{2})
  - Land: 3.00 sq mi (7.77 km^{2})
  - Water: 0 sq mi (0.00 km^{2})
- Elevation: 4,554 ft (1,388 m)

Population (2020)
  - Total: 240
  - Density: 80.0/sq mi (30.89/km^{2})
- Time zone: UTC-7 (Mountain (MST))
  - Summer (DST): UTC-6 (MDT)
- ZIP code: 57751
- Area code: 605
- FIPS code: 46-33820
- GNIS feature ID: 1267444
- Website: keystonesd.govoffice3.com

Keystone is a city in the Black Hills region of Pennington County, South Dakota, United States. The population was 240 at the 2020 census. It had its origins in 1883 as a mining town, and has since transformed itself into a resort town, serving the needs of the millions of visitors to the Mount Rushmore National Memorial, which is located just beyond the town limits. Keystone was heavily damaged in the 1972 Black Hills flood.

The town took its name from a local mine, which most likely was named after the keystone Masonic symbol.

== Geography ==
According to the United States Census Bureau, the town has a total area of 2.86 square miles (7.41 km^{2}), all land.

== Demographics ==
Historical population
Census	Pop.	Note	%±
1980	295		—
1990	232		−21.4%
2000	311		34.1%
2010	337		8.4%
2020	240		−28.8%
U.S. Decennial Census

=== 2010 census ===
At the 2010 census there were 337 people, 153 households, and 81 families living in the town. The population density was 117.8 inhabitants per square mile (45.5/km^{2}). There were 230 housing units at an average density of 80.4 units per square mile (31.0 units/km^{2}). The racial makeup of the town was 93.8% White, 3.3% Native American, 0.6% Asian, 0.3% Pacific Islander, 0.3% from other races, and 1.8% from two or more races. Hispanic or Latino of any race were 8.3%.

Of the 153 households 23.5% had children under the age of 18 living with them, 39.2% were married couples living together, 8.5% had a female householder with no husband present, 5.2% had a male householder with no wife present, and 47.1% were non-families. 34.0% of households were one person and 10.4% were one person aged 65 or older. The average household size was 2.20 and the average family size was 2.83.

The median age in the town was 42.8 years. 22.3% of residents were under the age of 18; 3.8% were between the ages of 18 and 24; 27.5% were from 25 to 44; 33.5% were from 45 to 64; and 12.8% were 65 or older. The gender makeup of the town was 50.7% male and 49.3% female.

=== 2000 census ===
At the 2000 census there were 311 people, 152 households, and 84 families living in the town. The population density was 108.6 inhabitants per square mile (41.9/km^{2}). There were 209 housing units at an average density of 73.0 units per square mile (28.2 units/km^{2}). The racial makeup of the town was 95.50% White, 1.93% Native American, 0.32% from other races, and 2.25% from two or more races. Hispanic or Latino of any race were 3.54%.

Of the 152 households 27.0% had children under the age of 18 living with them, 37.5% were married couples living together, 12.5% had a female householder with no husband present, and 44.1% were non-families. 35.5% of households were one person and 11.8% were one person aged 65 or older. The average household size was 2.05 and the average family size was 2.60.

The age distribution was 20.9% under the age of 18, 5.8% from 18 to 24, 30.9% from 25 to 44, 30.9% from 45 to 64, and 11.6% 65 or older. The median age was 41 years. For every 100 females, there were 89.6 males. For every 100 females age 18 and over, there were 95.2 males.

The median household income was $26,406, and the median family income was $36,250. Males had a median income of $24,219 versus $17,500 for females. The per capita income for the town was $15,828. About 13.9% of families and 16.9% of the population were below the poverty line, including 17.9% of those under age 18 and 23.3% of those age 65 or over.

== Arts and culture ==
Among its tourist attractions is the Black Hills Central Railroad, built in 1900 for Black Hills gold. It now operates passenger trains pulled by preserved steam locomotives.

Another prominent local attraction is The National Presidential Wax Museum, which features wax sculptures of every president in U.S. history and several notable Sioux Chiefs, inventors, and international political figures. The wax figures are the work of world-renowned wax sculptor Katherine Stubergh whose notable works include wax figures used in the 1939 film Gone With the Wind and the 1953 film House of Wax.

Carrie Ingalls (sister of Little House on the Prairie author Laura Ingalls Wilder) spent a significant part of her adult life there, living with her husband David N. Swanzey and his children. Her sister Mary Ingalls lived with them as an adult. Both Carrie and Mary died in Keystone, but were buried in the family plot in De Smet.

== Education ==
It is in Hill City School District 51-2.

== Photo gallery ==
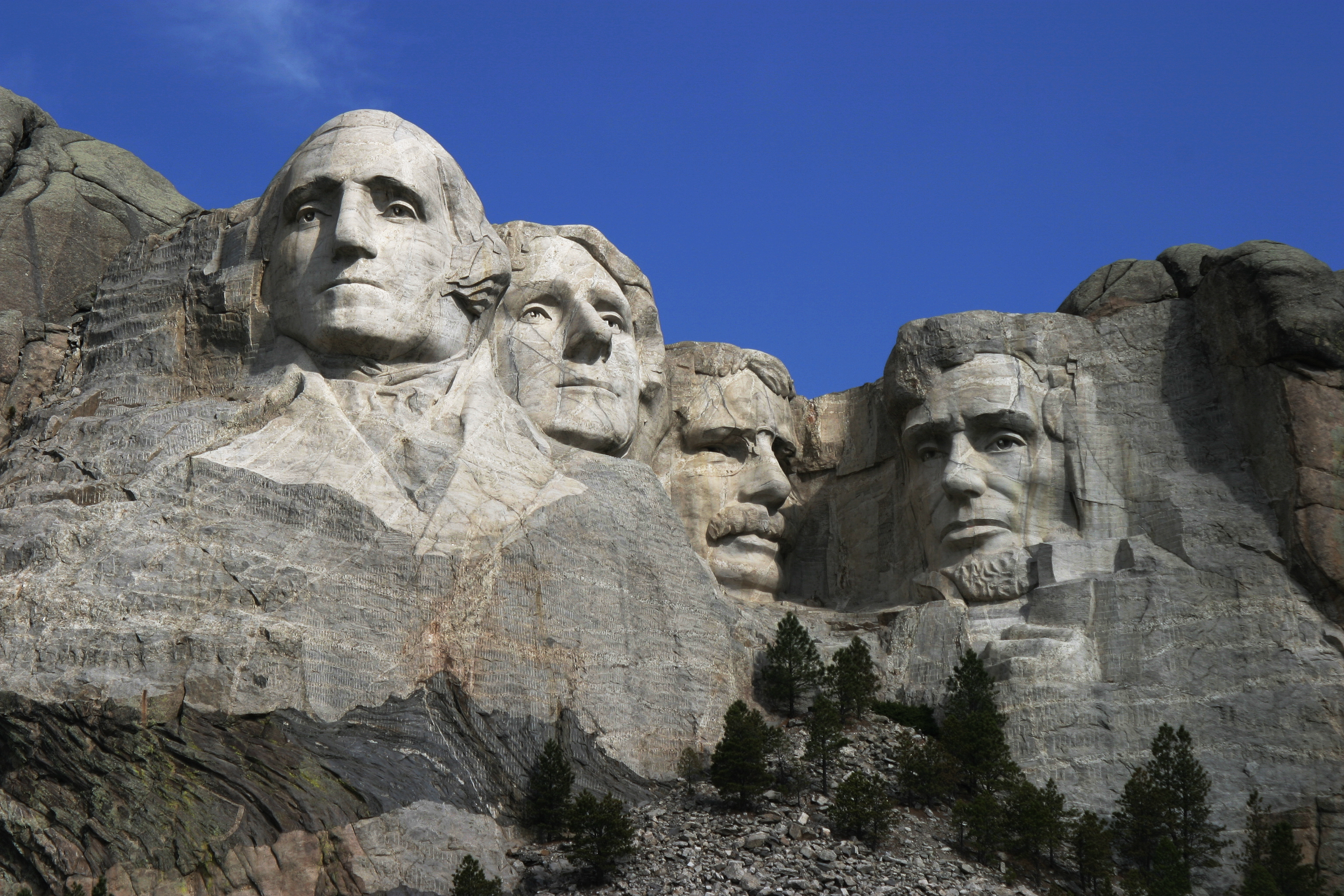
Mount Rushmore

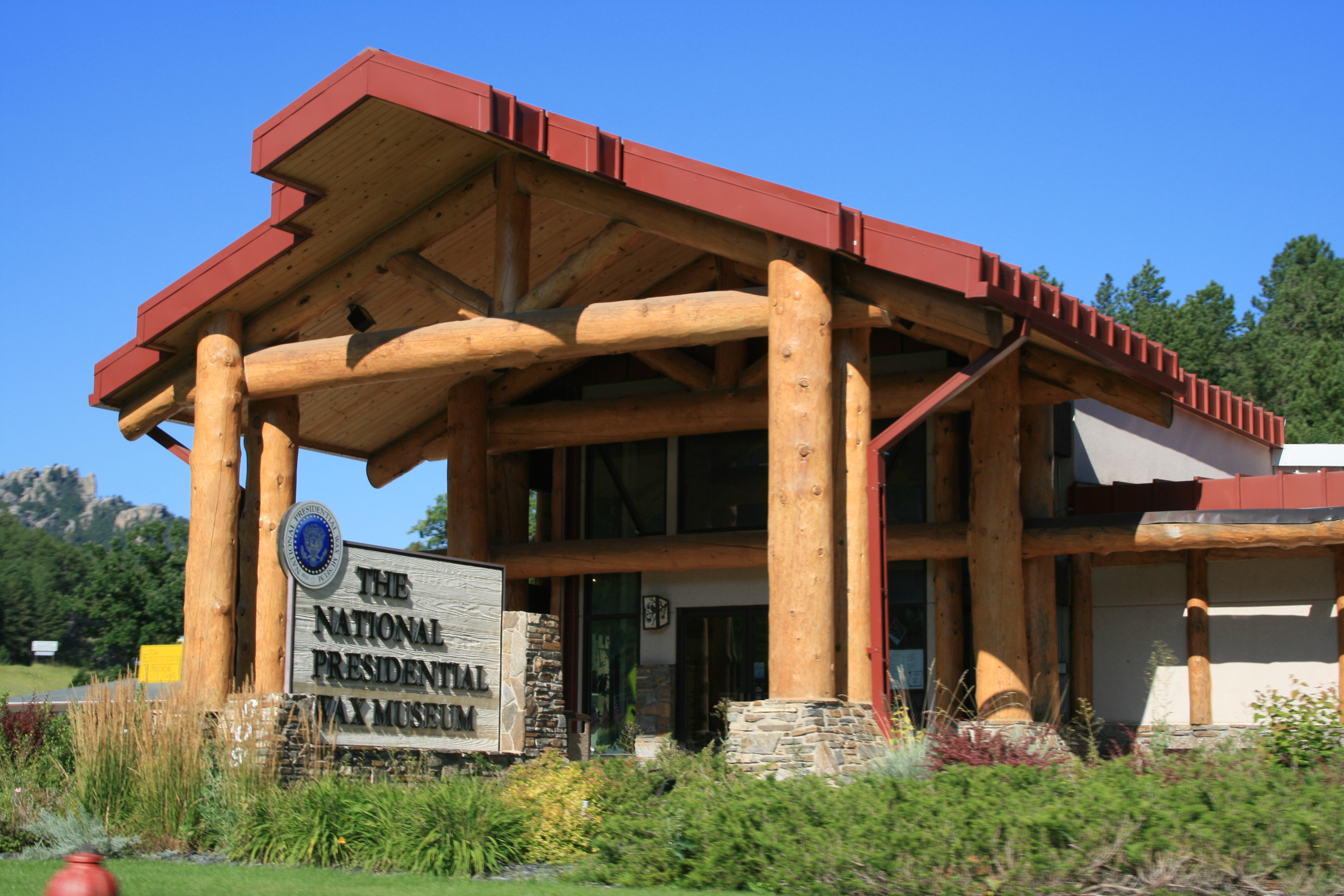
The National Presidential Wax Museum, a private museum in Keystone

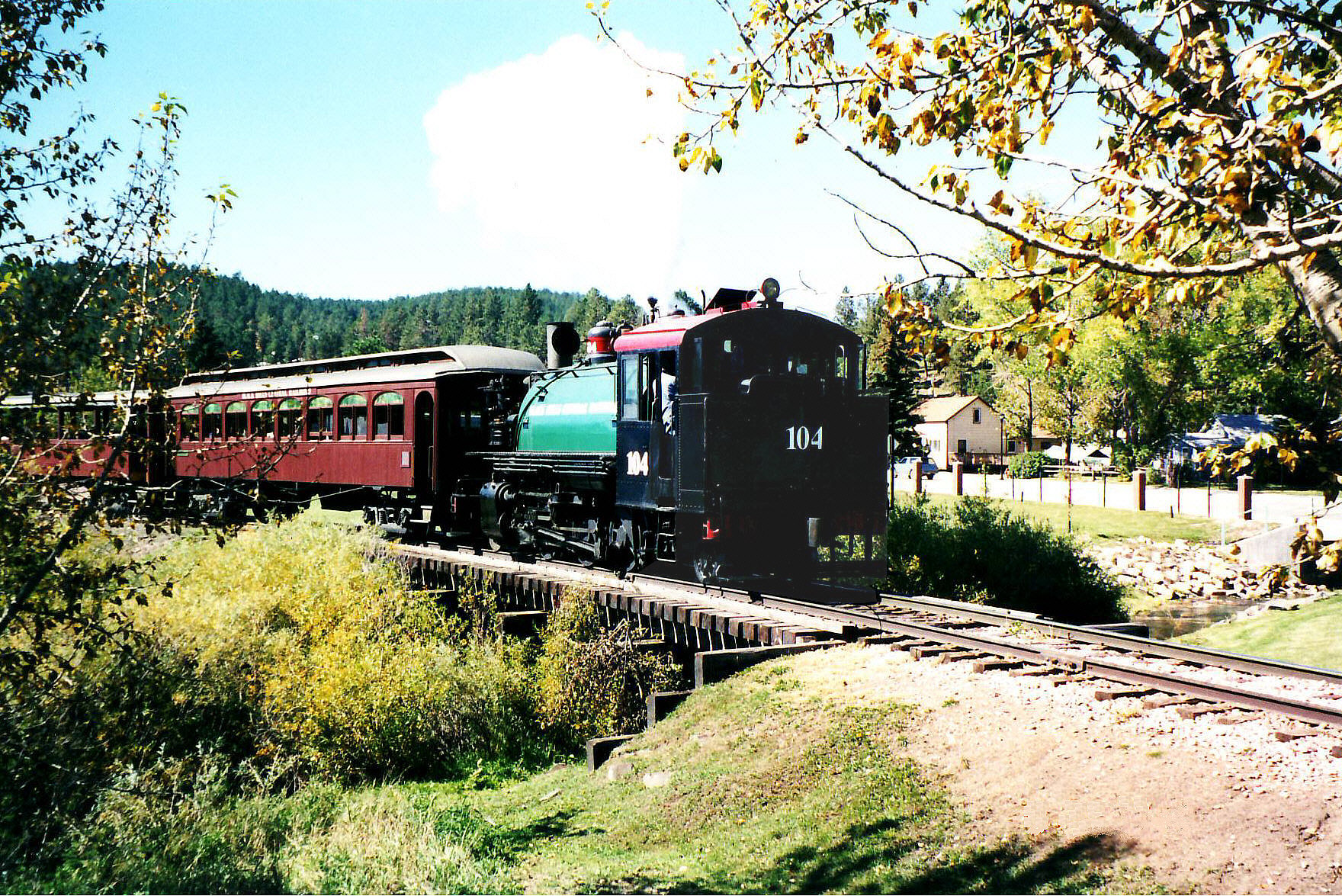
Black Hills Central Railroad

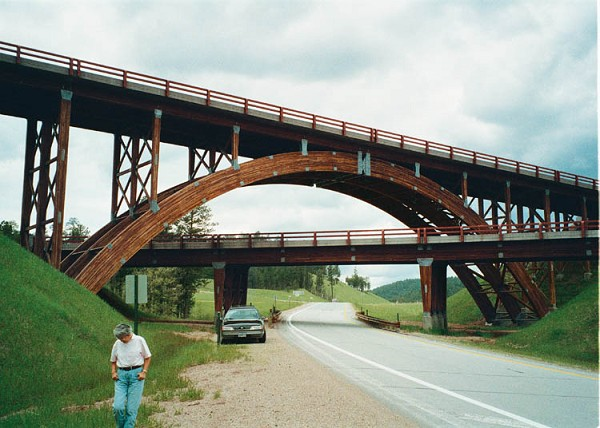
Keystone Wye just north of the town

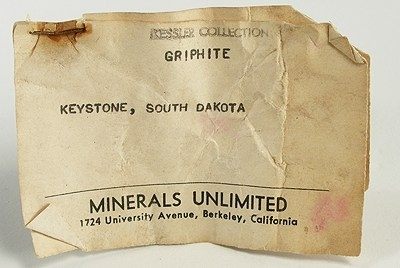
Identification card of griphite mineral

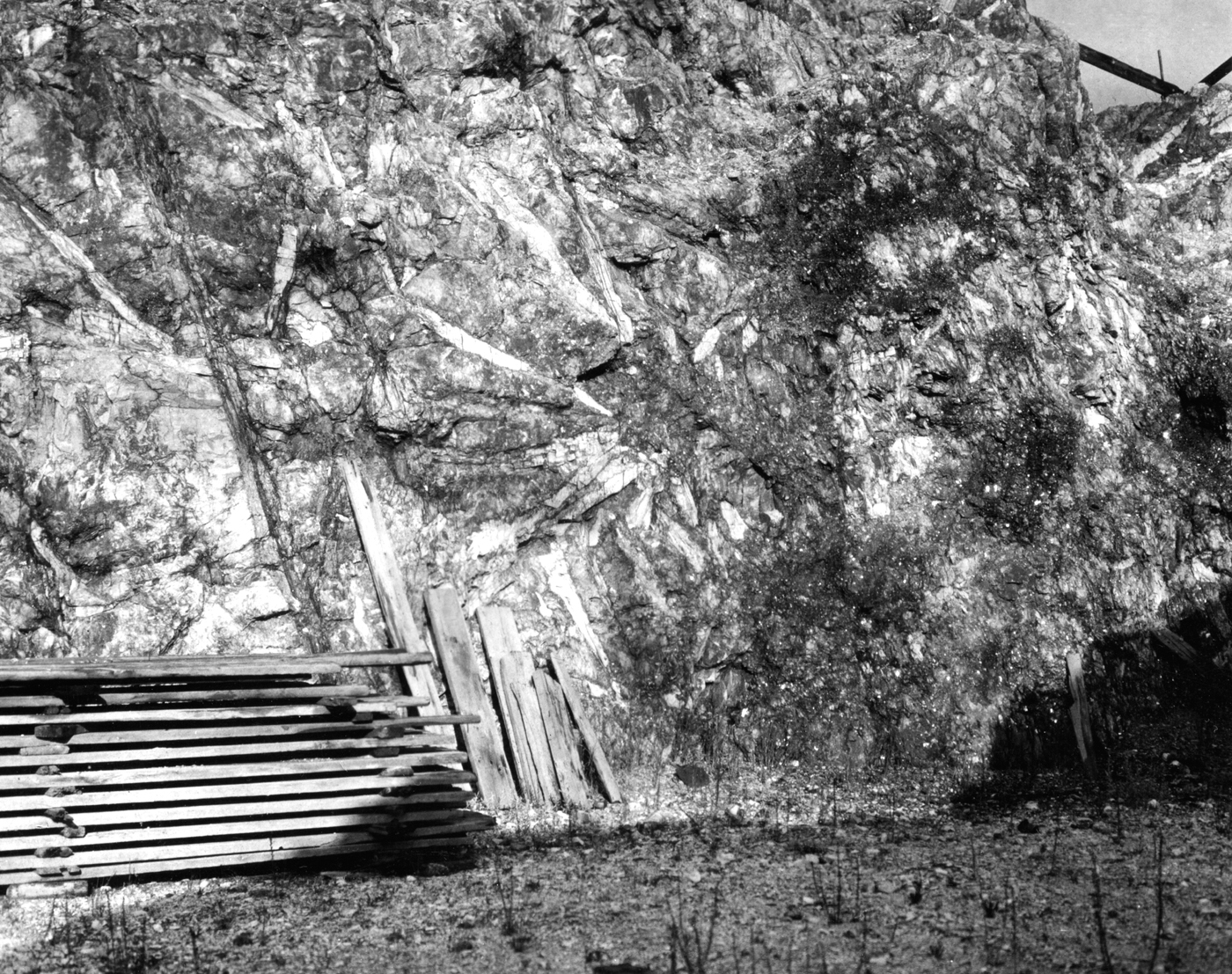
Crystals at the Etta Mine

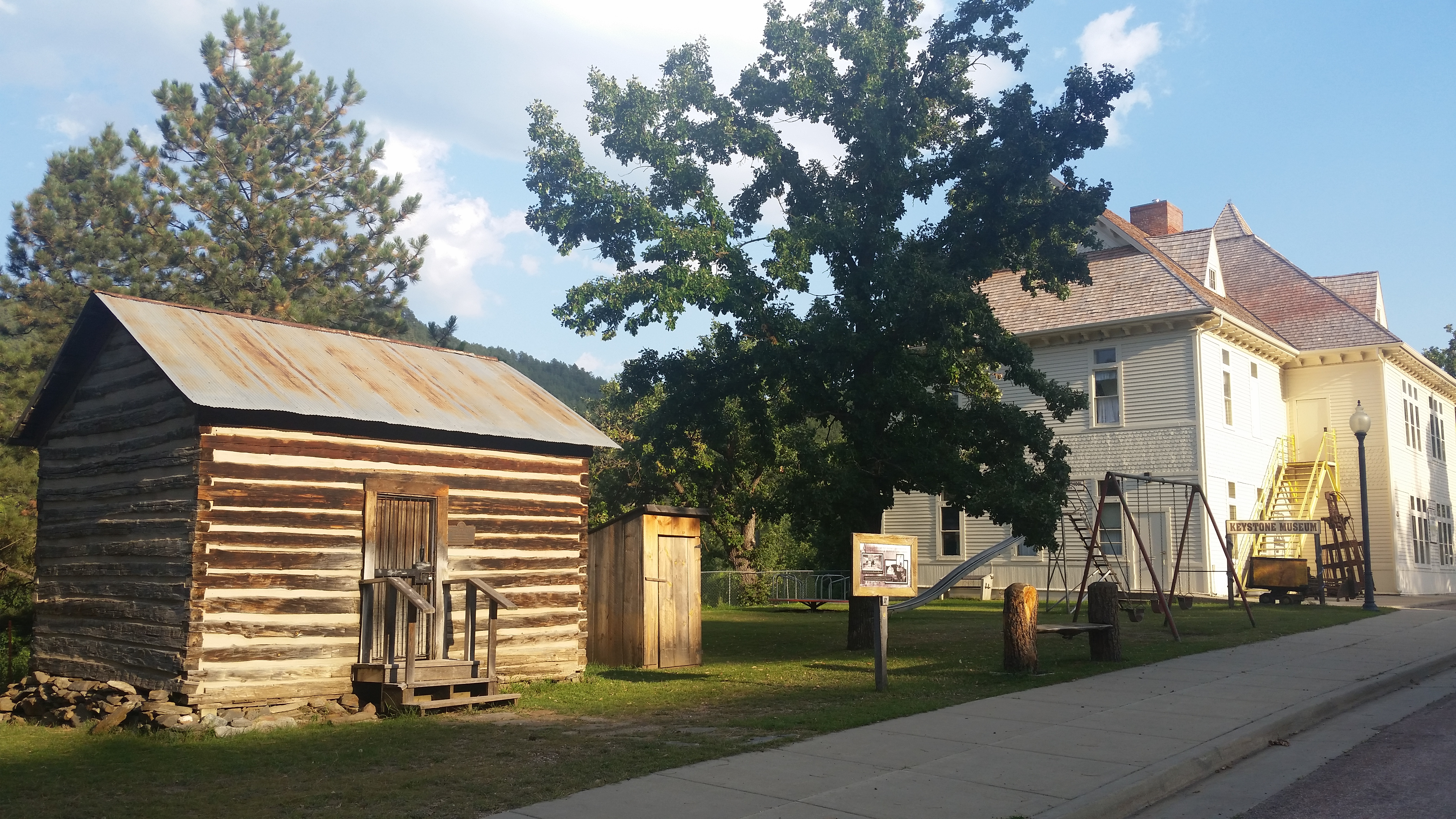
Keystone schools from 1895 and 1899, now a museum
