= South Dakota Department of Transportation =

Department of the state government of South Dakota, United States

South Dakota Department of Transportation (SDDOT)
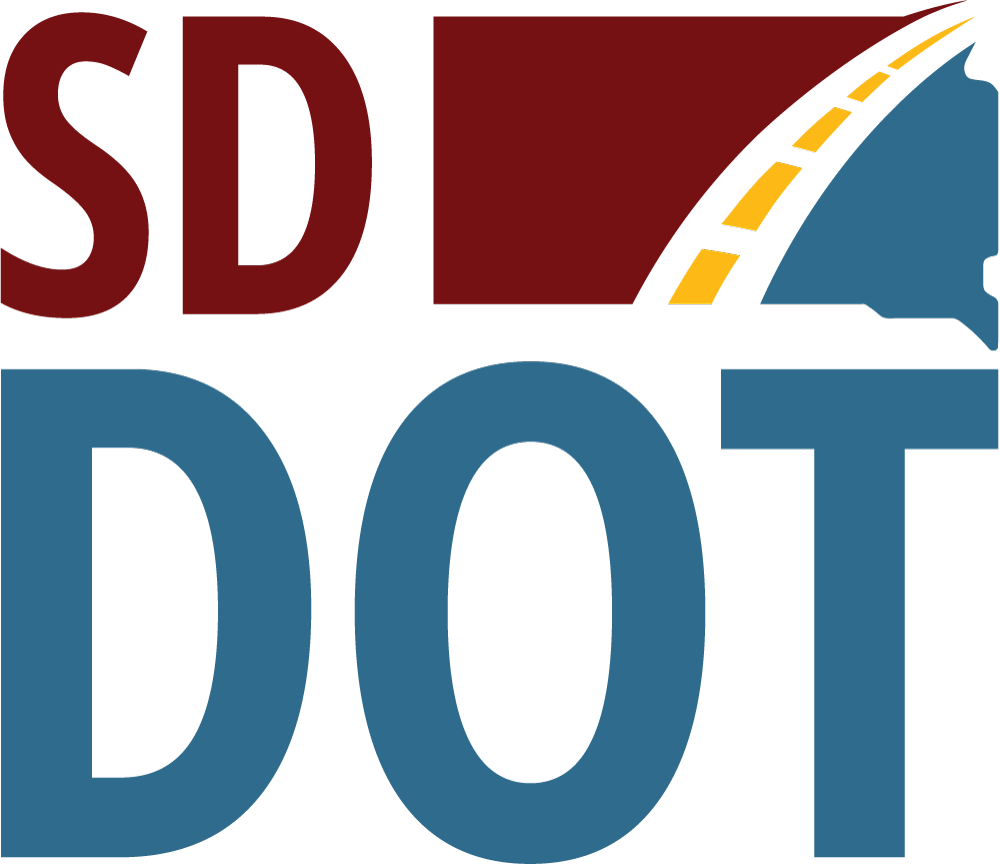

Agency overview
- Formed: 1917
- Preceding agencies: State Highway Commission; South Dakota Highway Department
- Jurisdiction: South Dakota
- Headquarters: Becker-Hansen Building, 700 E. Broadway Avenue, Pierre, South Dakota 57501
- Employees: 997 full-time, 77 seasonal
- Agency executive: Joel Jundt, P.E., Secretary of Transportation
- Parent agency: State of South Dakota
- Website: dot.sd.gov

The South Dakota Department of Transportation (SDDOT) is a state government organization in charge of maintaining public roadways of the U.S. state of South Dakota. South Dakota has 82,447 miles of highways, roads and streets, as well as 5,905 bridges. The SDDOT is responsible for 7,830 miles of the roadway system.

The DOT budgets roughly $15,700,000 for winter snow and ice removal each year.

The Department of Transportation was formerly known as the South Dakota Department of Highways.

== Historic bridges ==
A number of its bridges have been deemed historic, and some are listed on the U.S. National Register of Historic Places. In particular, several were listed on the National Register pursuant to a 1993 Multiple Property Submission titled "Historic Bridges in South Dakota, 1893-1943." The listed works include (with varying attribution):

- Kemp Avenue Bridge, Kemp Avenue over the Sioux River, Watertown, South Dakota (South Dakota Highway Commission), NRHP-listed
- Pig Tail Bridge, South Dakota Highway 87 loop over South Dakota Highway 87, north of Norbeck Lake, Wind Cave National Park, Hot Springs, South Dakota (South Dakota Highway Dept.), NRHP-listed
- South Dakota Dept. of Transportation Bridge No. 03-020-008, local road over unnamed creek, Wessington, South Dakota (South Dakota Highway Commission), NRHP-listed
- South Dakota Dept. of Transportation Bridge No. 07-220-454, local road over Mud Creek, Stratford, South Dakota (South Dakota State Highway Commission), NRHP-listed
- South Dakota Dept. of Transportation Bridge No. 07-304-414, local road over Ferney Ravine, Ferney, South Dakota (South Dakota Highway Commission), NRHP-listed
- South Dakota Dept. of Transportation Bridge No. 25-218-141, 10th Ave. over the South Fork of Snake Creek, Faulkton, South Dakota (South Dakota Highway Commission), NRHP-listed
- South Dakota Dept. of Transportation Bridge No. 48-244-204, local road over the Little White River, White River, South Dakota (South Dakota Highway Commission), NRHP-listed
- Summit Avenue Viaduct, Summit Ave. over the Chicago and North Western Railroad tracks, Sioux Falls, South Dakota (South Dakota Highway Commission), NRHP-listed

== See also ==
- Transportation in South Dakota
