= National Register of Historic Places listings in Custer County, South Dakota =

Location of Custer County in South Dakota

This is a list of the National Register of Historic Places listings in Custer County, South Dakota.

This is intended to be a complete list of the properties and districts on the National Register of Historic Places in Custer County, South Dakota, United States. The locations of National Register properties and districts for which the latitude and longitude coordinates are included below, may be seen in a map.

There are 51 properties and districts listed on the National Register in the county.

This National Park Service list is complete through NPS recent listings posted March 21, 2025.

== Current listings ==
	Name on the Register	Image	Date listed	Location	City or town	Description
1	Archeological Site No. 39CU70	Archeological Site No. 39CU70	October 20, 1993 (#93001039)	Address restricted	Custer	
2	Archeological Site No. 39CU890	Archeological Site No. 39CU890	August 6, 1993 (#93000803)	Address restricted	Hermosa	
3	Archeological Site No. 39CU1619	Archeological Site No. 39CU1619	June 3, 1999 (#99000679)	Address restricted	Custer	
4	Archeological Site No. 39CU2565	Archeological Site No. 39CU2565	February 23, 2016 (#16000047)	Address restricted	Dewey vicinity	
5	Archeological Site No. 39CU3178	Archeological Site No. 39CU3178	February 23, 2016 (#16000048)	Address restricted	Dewey vicinity	
6	Archeological Site No. 39CU3393	Archeological Site No. 39CU3393	February 23, 2016 (#16000049)	Address restricted	Dewey vicinity	
7	Archeological Site No. 39CU4164	Archeological Site No. 39CU4164	February 23, 2016 (#16000050)	Address restricted	Dewey vicinity	
8	Lonnie and Francis Ayres Ranch		January 25, 1991 (#90002209)	2 miles southeast of Fourmile Junction on U.S. Route 16; 43°43′01″N 103°39′01″W	Custer	
9	Badger Hole	Badger Hole	March 7, 1973 (#73001740)	1 mile east of Legion Lake on U.S. Route 16A; 43°45′27″N 103°27′28″W	Custer	
10	Maria Bauer Homestead Ranch	Maria Bauer Homestead Ranch	June 9, 1992 (#92000683)	3 miles southeast of Jewel Cave National Monument; 43°42′43″N 103°46′43″W	Custer	
11	Beaver Creek Bridge	Beaver Creek Bridge	August 8, 1984 (#84003254)	Wind Cave National Park, Highway 87, 0.5 miles north of U.S. Route 385; 43°35′04″N 103°29′19″W	Hot Springs	
12	Beaver Creek Rockshelter	Beaver Creek Rockshelter	October 25, 1993 (#93001130)	Southern side of Beaver Creek, northeast of Wind Cave; 43°34′54″N 103°28′14″W	Pringle	
13	Buffalo Gap Cheyenne River Bridge		February 8, 1988 (#88000024)	County Road 656; 43°30′07″N 103°04′29″W	Buffalo Gap	Replaced in 2014
14	Buffalo Gap Historic Commercial District	Buffalo Gap Historic Commercial District	June 30, 1995 (#95000774)	Roughly the area surrounding Main, 2nd, and Walnut Sts. 43°29′31″N 103°18′43″W	Buffalo Gap	A boundary decrease was approved January 29, 2024.
15	CCC Camp Custer Officers' Cabin	CCC Camp Custer Officers' Cabin	June 9, 1992 (#92000684)	8 miles northwest of Custer on County Road 292; 43°48′26″N 103°42′59″W	Custer	
16	Cold Springs Schoolhouse	Cold Springs Schoolhouse	March 7, 1973 (#73001741)	Southeast of Custer off Highway 336 in the Black Hills National Forest; 43°37′24″N 103°30′24″W	Custer	
17	Custer County Courthouse	Custer County Courthouse	November 27, 1972 (#72001226)	411 Mt. Rushmore Rd. 43°45′59″N 103°36′04″W	Custer	
18	Custer State Game Lodge	Custer State Game Lodge	March 30, 1983 (#83003007)	East of Custer on U.S. Route 16A; 43°45′49″N 103°22′51″W	Custer	
19	Custer State Park Museum	Custer State Park Museum	March 30, 1983 (#83003008)	West of Hermosa on U.S. Route 16A; 43°45′56″N 103°23′02″W	Hermosa	
20	Fairburn Historic Commercial District		June 30, 1995 (#95000772)	Roughly the area surrounding Main St. between 1st and 2nd Sts.; also Blk. 7, Lots 3-10; 43°41′08″N 103°12′39″W	Fairburn	The district's boundaries were decreased on 2018-12-28
21	First National Bank Building	First National Bank Building	March 5, 1982 (#82003924)	6th St. and Mt. Rushmore Rd. 43°46′04″N 103°36′02″W	Custer	
22	Fourmile School No. 21		January 25, 1991 (#90002208)	¼ mile south of Fourmile Junction on U.S. Route 16; 43°43′42″N 103°40′30″W	Custer	Possibly demolished or moved.
23	Galena Creek Schoolhouse		February 7, 2023 (#100008618)	25151 Badger Clark Rd. (Custer State Park); 43°44′52″N 103°25′56″W	Custer vicinity	
24	Garlock Building	Garlock Building	January 28, 2004 (#03001524)	522 Mount Rushmore Rd. 43°46′07″N 103°35′59″W	Custer	
25	Grace Coolidge Memorial Log Building	Grace Coolidge Memorial Log Building	June 21, 2001 (#01000680)	644 Crook St. 43°46′04″N 103°35′52″W	Custer	
26	Hermosa Masonic Lodge	Hermosa Masonic Lodge	February 17, 2009 (#09000043)	Western side of 2nd St., between Folsom St. and Highway 40; 43°50′25″N 103°11′29″W	Hermosa	
27	Historic Trail and Cave Entrance	Historic Trail and Cave Entrance	April 19, 1995 (#95000337)	From old ranger station HS-1 to the old cave entrance at Jewel Cave National Monument; 43°44′00″N 103°50′31″W	Custer	
28	Charles and Ollie Lampert Ranch		July 5, 1990 (#90000951)	South of the Elk Mountains north of Dewey; 43°37′33″N 104°00′48″W	Custer	
29	Irene and Walter Mann Ranch		July 5, 1990 (#90000953)	Schenk Canyon area, just off County Road 270; 43°39′00″N 103°56′00″W	Custer	
30	Peter Norbeck Summer House	Peter Norbeck Summer House	September 13, 1977 (#77001241)	Custer State Park; 43°48′07″N 103°27′03″W	Custer	
31	Pig Tail Bridge	Pig Tail Bridge	April 7, 1995 (#95000344)	Highway 87 loop over Highway 87, north of Norbeck Lake at Wind Cave National Park; 43°36′04″N 103°29′38″W	Hot Springs	
32	Ranger Station	Ranger Station	April 5, 1995 (#95000336)	Old administration area at Jewel Cave National Monument; 43°44′00″N 103°50′29″W	Custer	
33	Red Shirt Bridge	Red Shirt Bridge	December 9, 1993 (#93001281)	Highway 40 over the Cheyenne River; 43°40′03″N 102°52′13″W	Red Shirt	
34	Ferdinand and Elizabeth Roetzel Ranch		January 25, 1991 (#90002210)	1 mile northwest of junction of Saginaw and Roetzel Rds. 43°50′38″N 103°42′39″W	Custer	
35	Site No. 39 Cu 91	Site No. 39 Cu 91	May 20, 1982 (#82004759)	Address restricted	City Restricted	
36	Site No. 39 Cu 510	Site No. 39 Cu 510	May 20, 1982 (#82004752)	Address restricted	City Restricted	
37	Site No. 39 Cu 511	Site No. 39 Cu 511	May 20, 1982 (#82004754)	Address restricted	City Restricted	
38	Site No. 39 Cu 512	Site No. 39 Cu 512	May 20, 1982 (#82004753)	Address restricted	City Restricted	
39	Site No. 39 Cu 513	Site No. 39 Cu 513	May 20, 1982 (#82004755)	Address restricted	City Restricted	
40	Site No. 39 Cu 514	Site No. 39 Cu 514	May 20, 1982 (#82004756)	Address restricted	City Restricted	
41	Site No. 39 Cu 515	Site No. 39 Cu 515	May 20, 1982 (#82004757)	Address restricted	City Restricted	
42	Site No. 39 Cu 516	Site No. 39 Cu 516	May 20, 1982 (#82004758)	Address restricted	City Restricted	
43	South Dakota Dept. of Transportation Bridge No. 17-289-107	South Dakota Dept. of Transportation Bridge No. 17-289-107	December 9, 1993 (#93001280)	Highway 87 over French Creek at Custer State Park; 43°42′56″N 103°28′47″W	Custer	Aka the French Creek Bridge.
44	William Stearns Ranch		July 5, 1990 (#90000952)	East of Elk Mountain, off County Highway 769; 43°40′09″N 103°59′30″W	Custer	
45	Norman B. Streeter Homestead	Norman B. Streeter Homestead	June 30, 1995 (#95000765)	Streeter Ranch, near Beaver Creek; 43°32′13″N 103°22′57″W	Buffalo Gap	
46	Francis Averill (T.A.) and Janet Leach Towner House	Francis Averill (T.A.) and Janet Leach Towner House	June 21, 1990 (#90000959)	218 Crook St. 43°46′30″N 103°36′15″W	Custer	
47	Newton Seymour Tubbs House	Newton Seymour Tubbs House	December 9, 1993 (#93001341)	35 Centennial Dr. 43°45′47″N 103°36′46″W	Custer	
48	Elbert and Harriet Ward Ranch		July 5, 1990 (#90000950)	East of Elk Mountain, south of U.S. Route 16; 43°42′21″N 103°58′11″W	Custer	
49	Way Park Museum	Way Park Museum	March 7, 1973 (#73001739)	4th St. and Rushmore Rd. 43°45′36″N 103°36′03″W	Custer	
50	Wind Cave National Park Administrative and Utility Area Historic District	Wind Cave National Park Administrative and Utility Area Historic District	July 11, 1984 (#84003259)	East of Custer off U.S. Route 385; 43°33′23″N 103°28′26″W	Custer	
51	Edna and Ernest Young Ranch		July 5, 1990 (#90000949)	Approximately 3 miles south of Dewey, south of Beaver Creek; 43°29′11″N 104°02′40″W	Custer	

== See also ==
- List of National Historic Landmarks in South Dakota
- National Register of Historic Places listings in South Dakota
