= National Register of Historic Places listings in Wind Cave National Park =

This is a list of the National Register of Historic Places listings in Wind Cave National Park.

This is intended to be a complete list of the properties and districts on the National Register of Historic Places in Wind Cave National Park, South Dakota, United States. The locations of National Register properties and districts for which the latitude and longitude coordinates are included below, may be seen in a Google map.

There are ten properties and districts listed on the National Register in the park.

This National Park Service list is complete through NPS recent listings posted March 14, 2025.

== Current listings ==
	Name on the Register	Image	Date listed	Location	City or town	Description
1	Beaver Creek Bridge	Beaver Creek Bridge	August 8, 1984 (#84003254)	Wind Cave National Park, Highway 87, 0.5 miles north of U.S. Route 385; 43°35′04″N 103°29′19″W	Hot Springs	
2	Beaver Creek Rockshelter	Beaver Creek Rockshelter	October 25, 1993 (#93001130)	Address Restricted	Pringle	
3	Pig Tail Bridge	Pig Tail Bridge	April 7, 1995 (#95000344)	Highway 87 loop over Highway 87, north of Norbeck Lake at Wind Cave National Park; 43°36′04″N 103°29′38″W	Hot Springs	
4	Wind Cave National Park Administrative and Utility Area Historic District	Wind Cave National Park Administrative and Utility Area Historic District	July 11, 1984 (#84003259)	East of Custer off U.S. Route 385; 43°33′23″N 103°28′26″W	Custer	

== See also ==
- National Register of Historic Places listings in Custer County, South Dakota
- National Register of Historic Places listings in South Dakota
