= Elbert and Harriet Ward Ranch =

- U.S. National Register of Historic Places
- Location within South Dakota Location within the United States
- Nearest city: Custer, South Dakota
- Coordinates: 43°39′38″N 103°58′13″W
- Area: 6 acres (2.4 ha)
- Built by: Ward, Elbert
- MPS: Ranches of Southwestern Custer Co. MPS
- NRHP reference No.: 90000950
- Added to NRHP: July 5, 1990

The Elbert and Harriet Ward Ranch, in Custer County, South Dakota near Custer, South Dakota, was listed on the National Register of Historic Places in 1990.

It is located East of Elk Mountain, and south of U.S. Route 16.

The listing included four contributing buildings and two contributing structures on 6 acres (2.4 ha). Contributing resources include:

- main house (c. 1932–34), a two-story building on a rock and cement foundation
- root cellar (c. 1916–34)
- milk house (c. 1916–34)
- privy (c. 1916–34)
- cistern (c. 1932–34), a rectangular "box" covered by a cement slab, at top of a hill, with capacity for 2,000 gallons
- chicken coop (c. 1916–34)
