= Vestal Springs, South Dakota =

Unincorporated community in South Dakota, U.S.

Coordinates: 43°49′43″N 103°41′11″W

Vestal Springs is an unincorporated community in Custer County, in the U.S. state of South Dakota.

The nearby spring has the name of Frank Vestal, a cattleman who settled there.
