= Custer High School =

Custer High School may refer to:

- Custer High School (Custer, Montana)
- Custer High School (Custer, South Dakota)
- Custer High School (Milwaukee, Wisconsin)
