= Argentine Township =

Argentine Township may refer to the following places in the United States:

- Argentine Township, Michigan
- Argentine Township, Fall River County, South Dakota
