= Norman B. Streeter Homestead =

- Streeter, Norman B., Homestead
- U.S. National Register of Historic Places
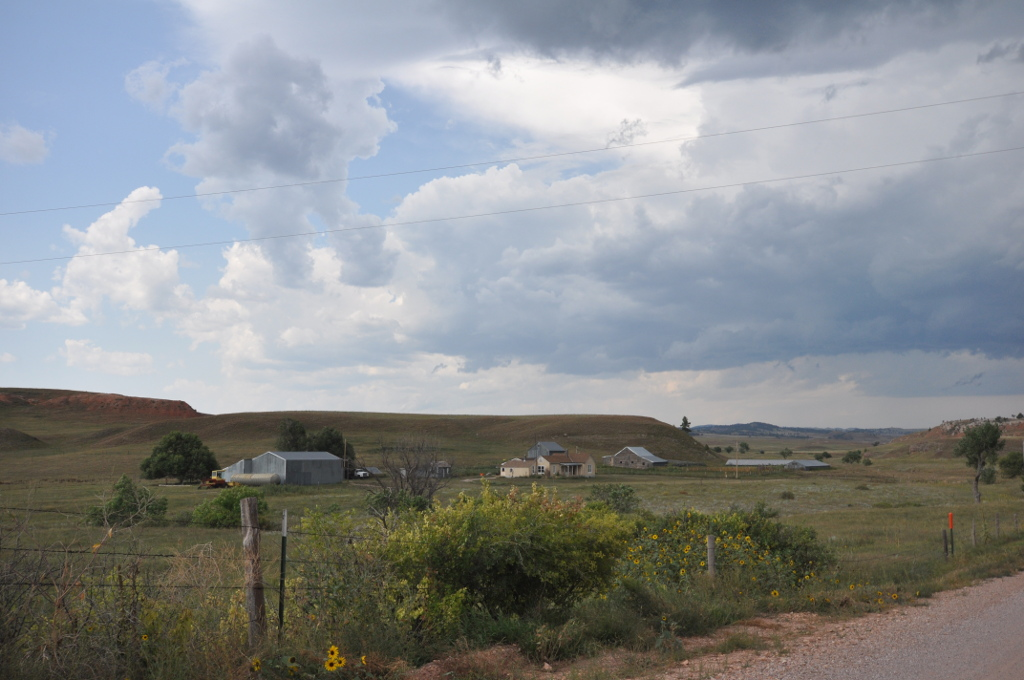

- Location within South Dakota Location within the United States
- Nearest city: Buffalo Gap, South Dakota
- Coordinates: 43°32′13″N 103°22′57″W
- Area: 10 acres (4.0 ha)
- Built: 1889
- Built by: Parker, Gideon; Streeter, Norman
- Architectural style: Late 19th and Early 20th Century American Movements
- MPS: Rural Resources of Eastern Custer County MPS
- NRHP reference No.: 95000765
- Added to NRHP: June 30, 1995

The Norman B. Streeter Homestead, on Streeter Ranch, in rural Custer County, South Dakota, near Beaver Creek, also near to Buffalo Gap, South Dakota, dates from 1889. It was listed on the National Register of Historic Places in 1995. The listing included nine contributing buildings on 10 acres (4.0 ha).
