= Buffalo Gap Cheyenne River Bridge =

- U.S. National Register of Historic Places
- Location within South Dakota
- Nearest city: Buffalo Gap, South Dakota
- Coordinates: 43°30′07″N 103°04′29″W
- Area: less than one acre
- Built: 1932
- Architectural style: Parker Through Truss
- NRHP reference No.: 88000024
- Added to NRHP: February 8, 1988

The Buffalo Gap Cheyenne River Bridge, in Custer County, South Dakota near Buffalo Gap, South Dakota, was built in 1932. It was listed on the National Register of Historic Places in 1988.

It is or was a Parker through truss bridge located on Custer County Road 656, about 11.7 miles (18.8 km) east and 0.8 feet (0.24 m) north of Buffalo Gap. It connected Custer County to the west and the Pine Ridge Indian Reservation to the east.

The bridge consisted of three 150 feet (46 m) Parker truss spans, resting on four poured concrete piers, rising about 25 feet (7.6 m) above the Cheyenne River. Together with reinforced concrete approach spans, the bridge was 694 feet (212 m) long.

The bridge was replaced in 2014.
