= Fairburn Historic Commercial District =

Historic district in South Dakota, United States

- U.S. National Register of Historic Places
- Location within South Dakota Location within the United States
- Location: Roughly, area surrounding Main St. between First and Second Sts., Fairburn, South Dakota
- Coordinates: 43°41′08″N 103°12′39″W
- Area: less than one acre
- Built: 1917
- Architectural style: Late 19th and Early 20th Century American Movements
- MPS: Rural Resources of Eastern Custer County MPS
- NRHP reference No.: 95000772; 100003267 (decrease)

Significant dates
- Added to NRHP: June 30, 1995
- Boundary decrease: December 28, 2018

The Fairburn Historic Commercial District is a historic district in Fairburn, South Dakota which was listed on the National Register of Historic Places in 1995. The listing then included five contributing buildings. It was decreased in size in 2018.

On the east side of Main Street, it includes two two-story false-front buildings, the IOOF Hall and Smith's Store. On the west side is a two-story gable-roofed building, the Warren-Lamb Hotel. These three buildings were built between 1917 and 1918.
