= Dewey, South Dakota =

- Unincorporated community
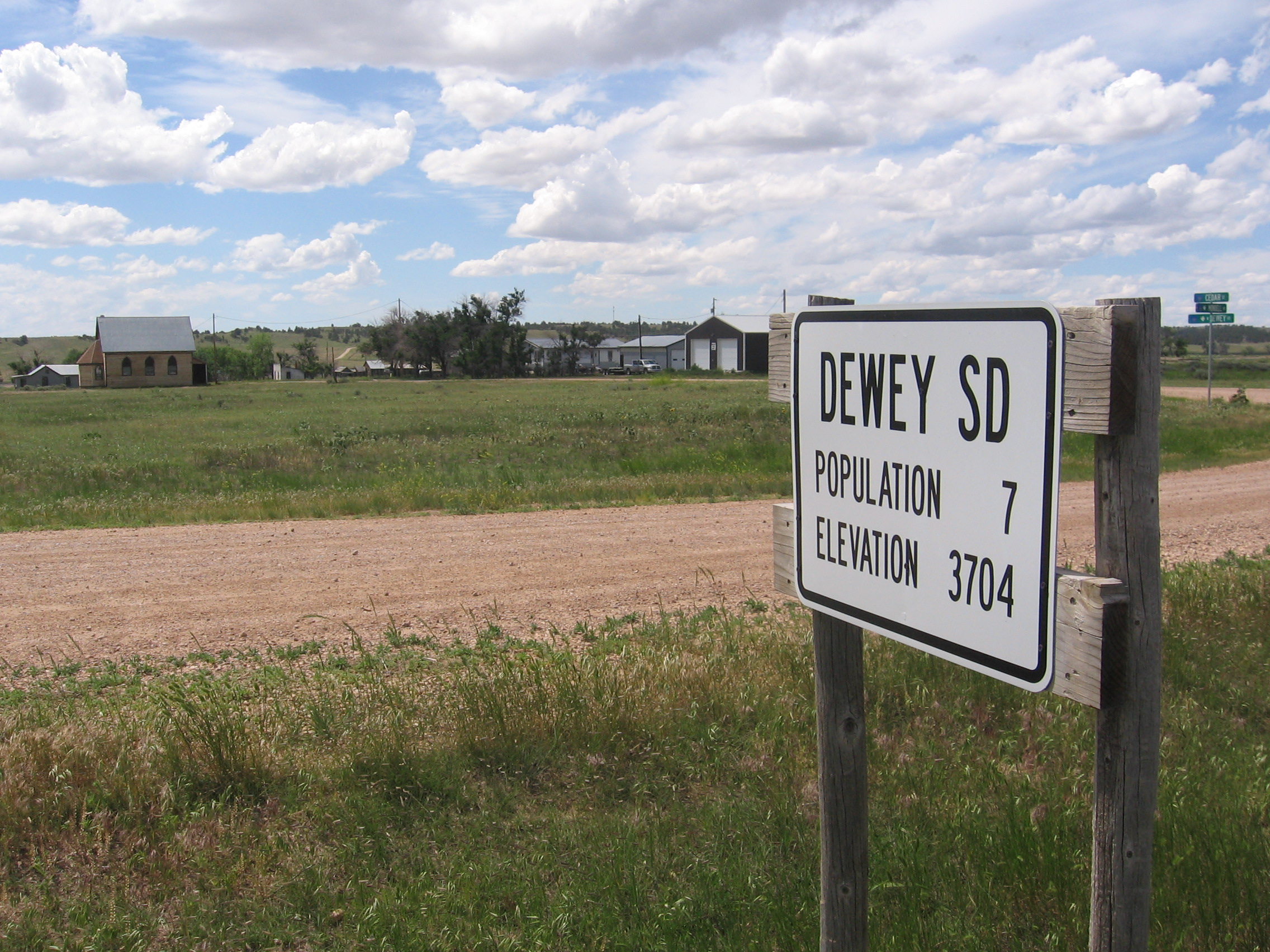
- Welcome sign

- Location of Dewey in South Dakota.
- Coordinates: 43°31′47.532″N 104°2′18.168″W
- Country: United States
- State: South Dakota
- County: Custer
- Township: West Custer UT (portion of Custer County west of Custer State Park)
- Elevation: 3,714 ft (1,132 m)

Population (2010)
  - Total: 7
- Time zone: UTC-7 (MST)
  - Summer (DST): UTC-6 (MDT)
- ZIP code: 57735
- Area code: 605
- FIPS code: 46-16380
- GNIS feature ID: 1261554

Dewey is an unincorporated community near the southwest corner of Custer County, South Dakota, United States, less than one mile from the Wyoming border in a prairie region of the Black Hills. There are approximately five or six homes in town. Dewey has a volunteer fire department in the Edgemont city district.

Dewey lies just to the southwest of the Elk Mountains, a small range that is part of the Black Hills. South Dewey Road leads into Fall River County southeast 6.1 miles (9.8 km) to Burdock and then to Edgemont—23 miles (37 km) from Dewey. Northwest of Dewey 30 miles (48 km) is Newcastle, Wyoming.

== History ==
Dewey was originally called "S and G Ranch" for its owners Sturgis and Goodell. The name was changed in 1890 by either the Burlington Railroad which came through the area that year, or the Post Office Department. The town is a populated place ("a place or area having clustered or scattered buildings and a permanent population") that is not a census designated or incorporated place with an official federally recognized name.

Dewey was a cattle town in the first half of the 20th century. Local ranchers used its rail depot to ship cattle to market.

Two ranches near Dewey are listed on the National Register of Historic Places in Custer County. The Edna and Ernest Young Ranch is approximately three miles south of town, south of Beaver Creek, while the Charles and Ollie Lampert Ranch is north of Dewey.

The Tennessee Valley Authority and private uranium companies have explored the Dewey / Burdock area since the 1970s. Several mines still exist in the area and the US Nuclear Regulatory Commission and the Environmental Protection Agency studied the area in 2012 and 2013 for new in-situ uranium recovery.

== Photo gallery ==
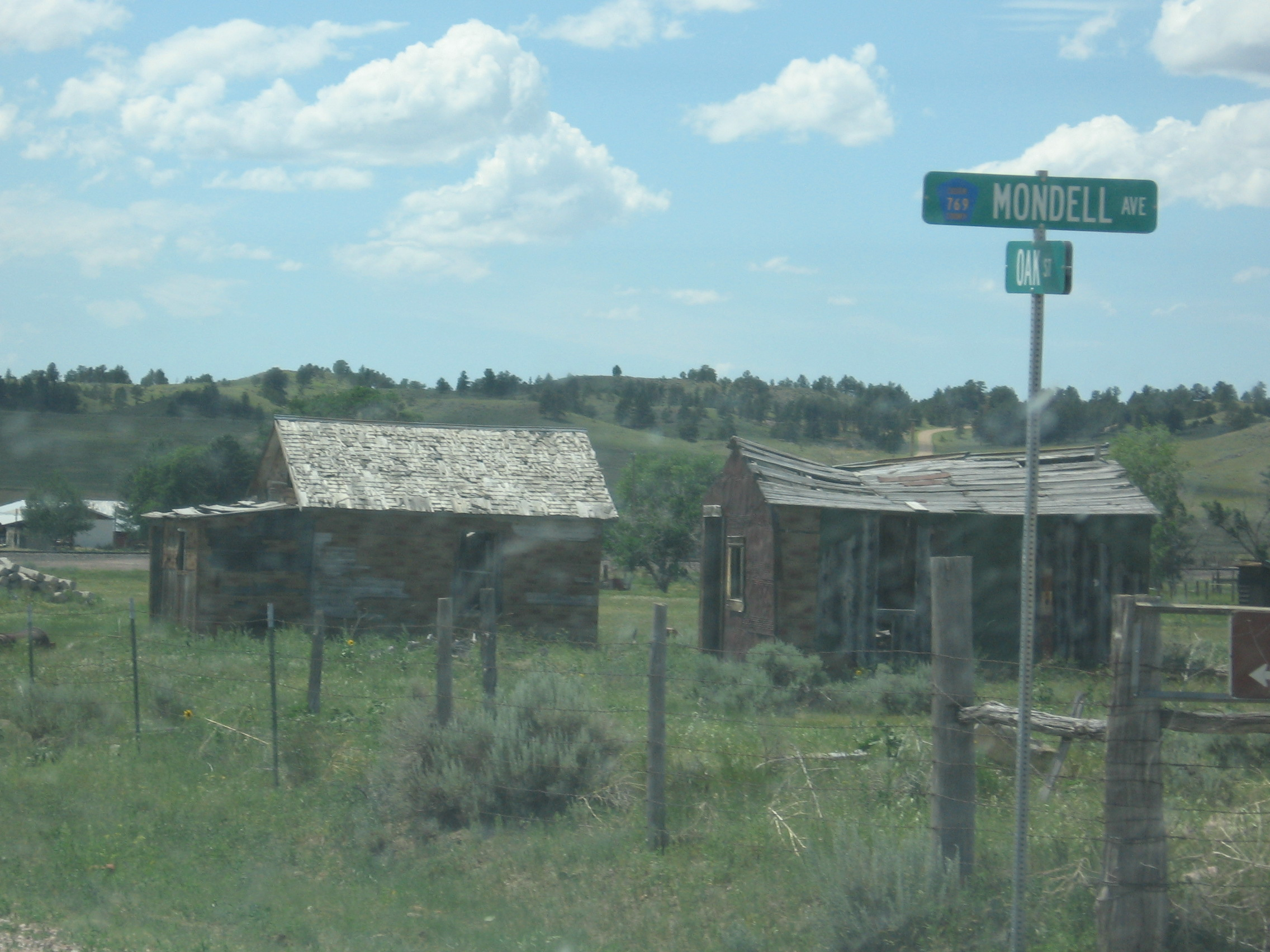
Old buildings in Dewey

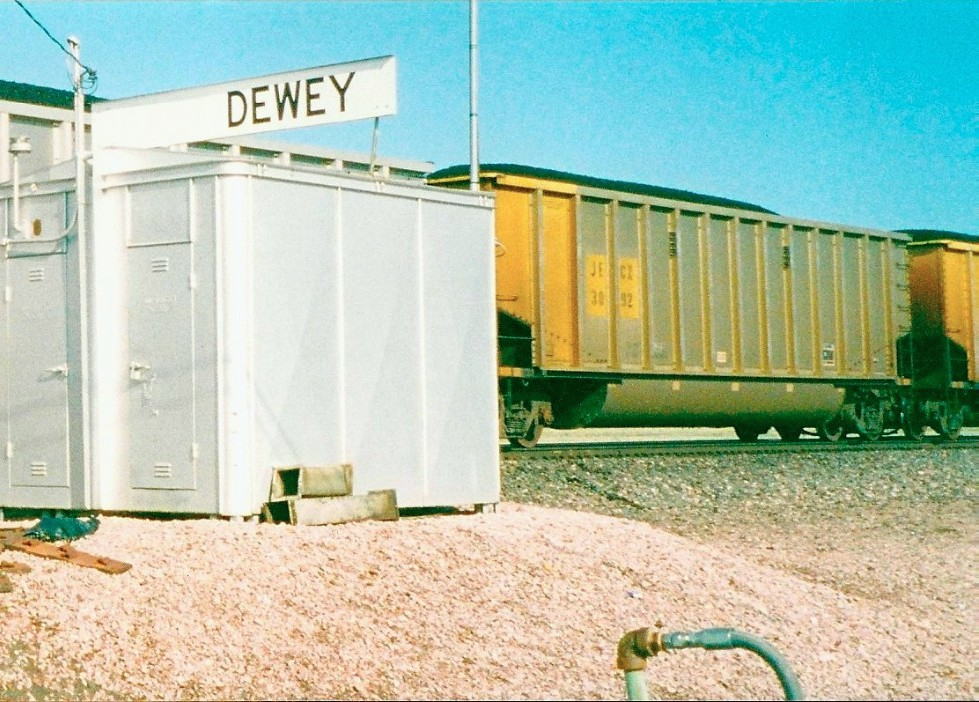
Freight rail building in Dewey

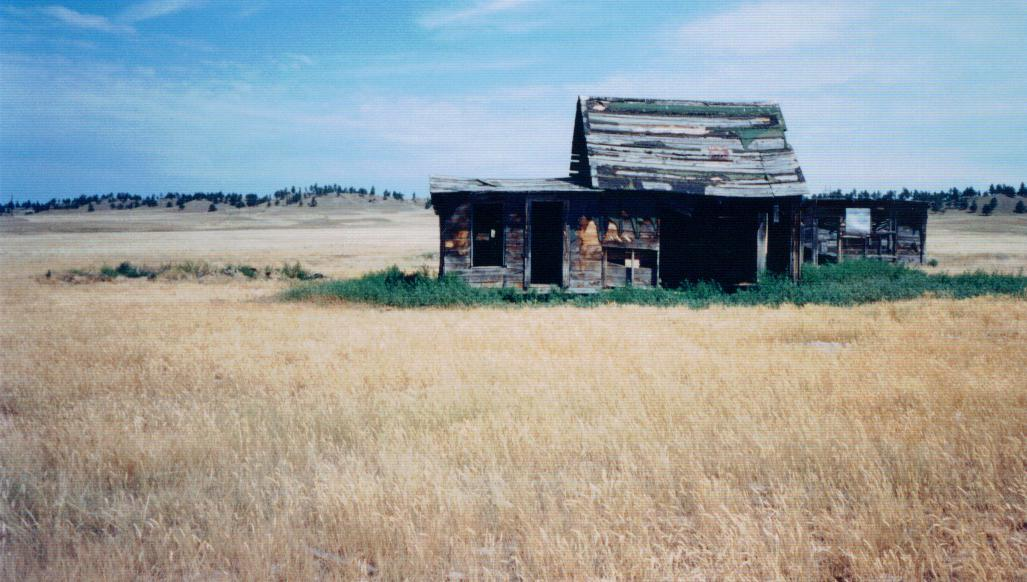
Abandoned cabin on South Dakota Route 715, Pilger Mountain Road, near the intersection of Dewey Road (Custer County Road 769)

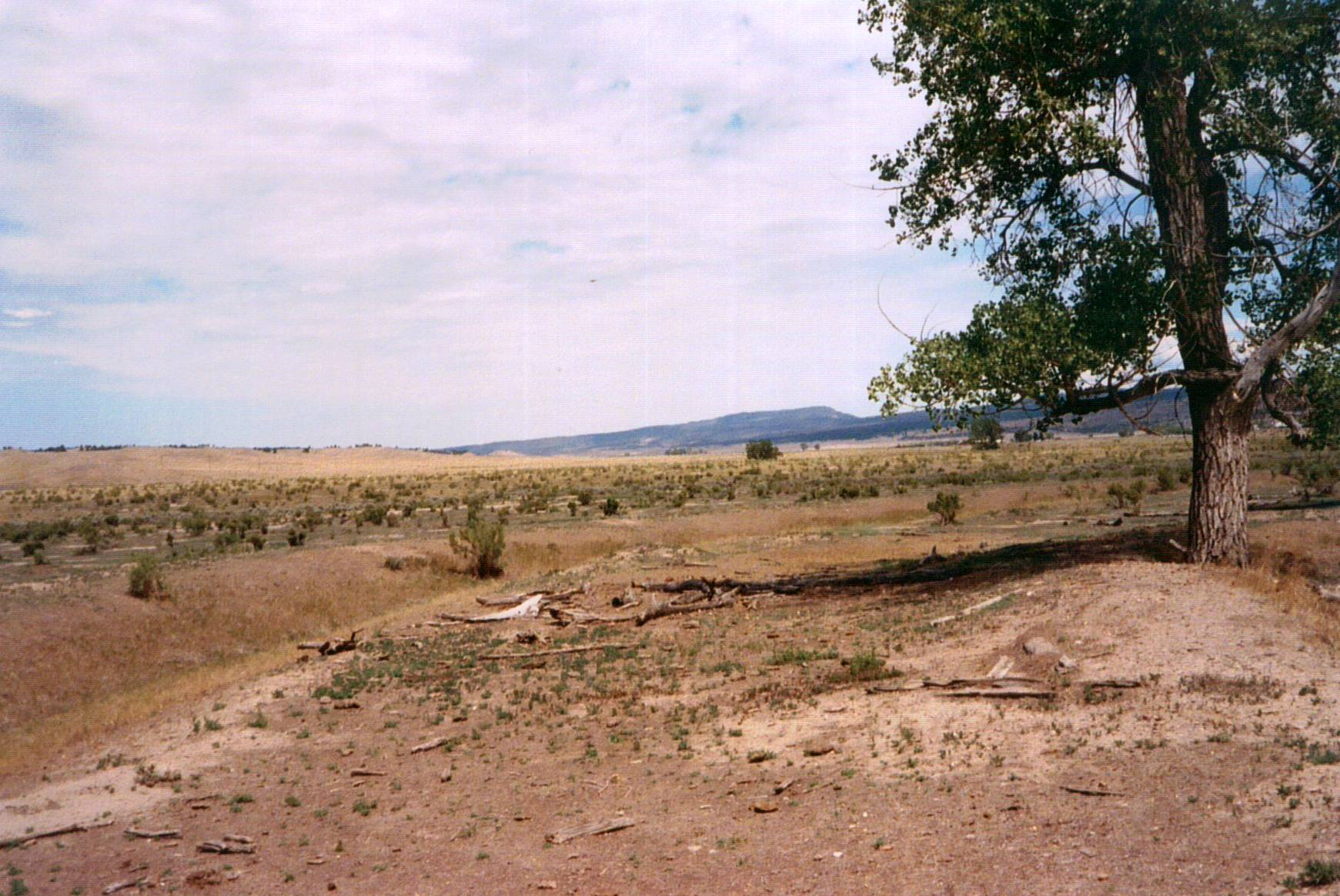
A desert scene. The mountains in the background are the Elk Mountains and Black Hills National Forest, separated from the Limestone Plateau by highlands and prairie.

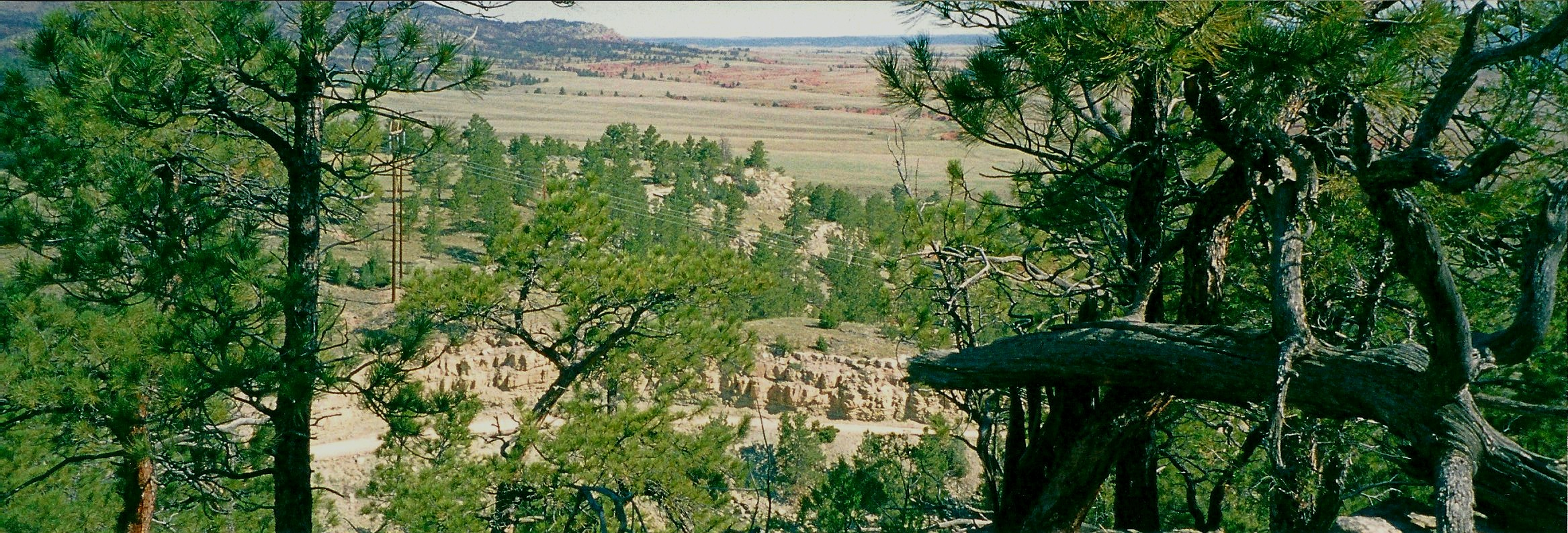
Red rock canyons near Dewey

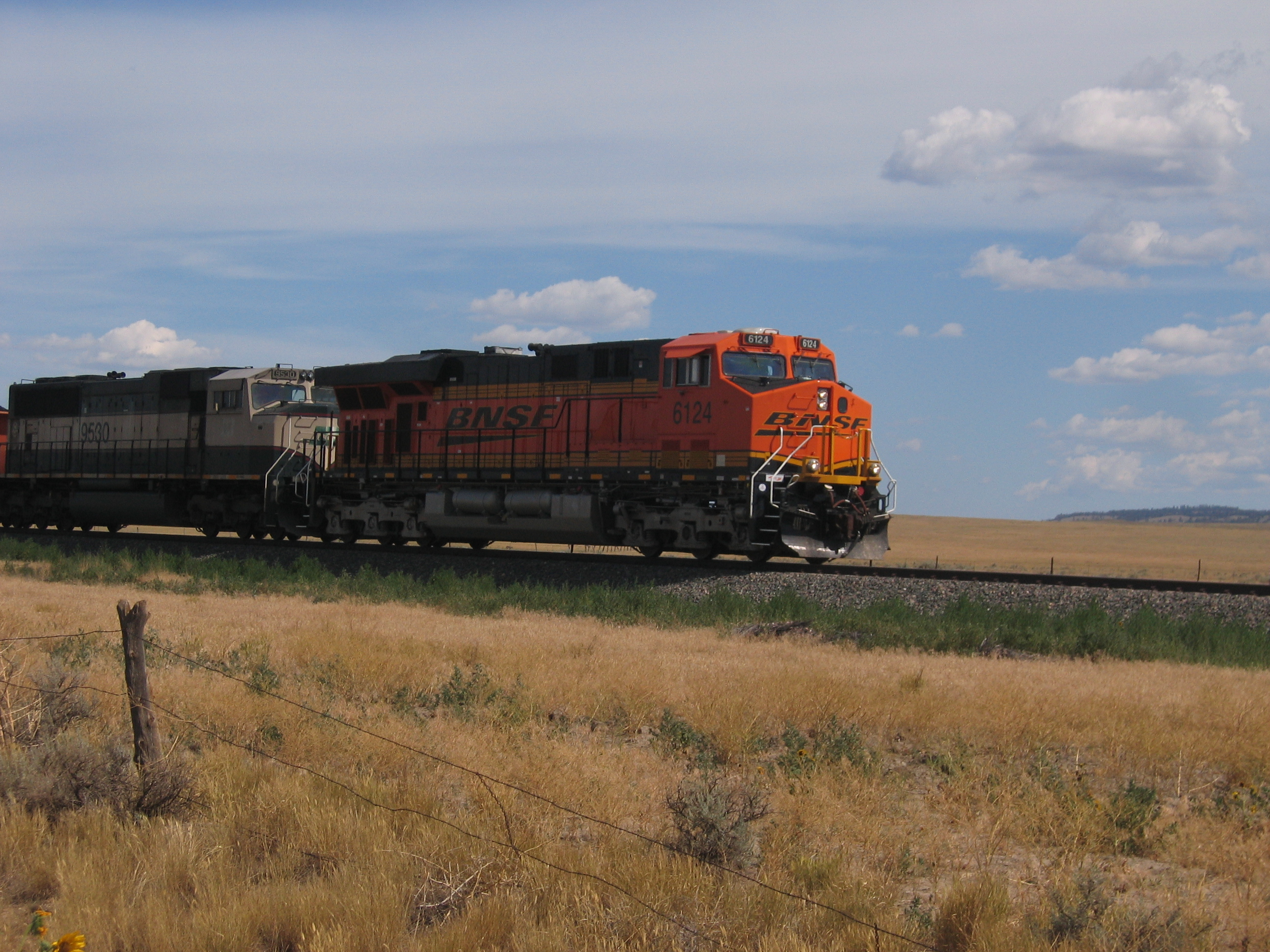
A BNSF Railway train near Dewey

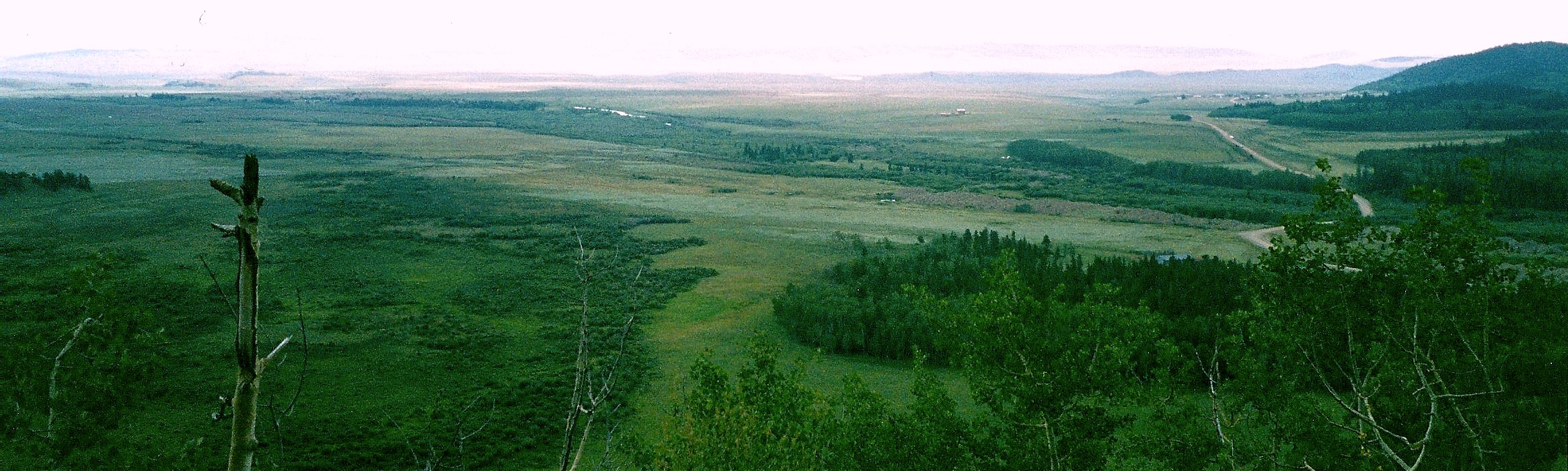
A view of the highlands in the southern Black Hills near Dewey

== Further information ==
- Joann Boggs. Presentation to the Custer County Historical Society around the early 2010s. Recording available from the society for a nominal fee.
