= Garlock Building =

- U.S. National Register of Historic Places
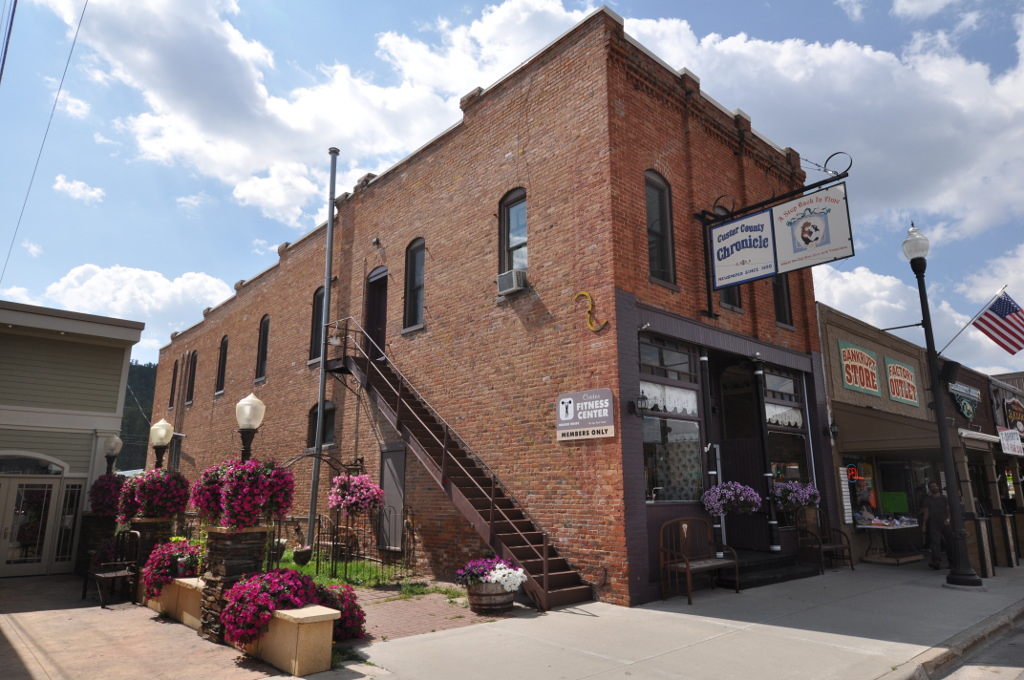

- Location within South Dakota
- Location: 522 Mount Rushmore Rd., Custer, South Dakota
- Coordinates: 43°46′07″N 103°35′59″W
- Area: less than one acre
- Built: 1890
- Architectural style: Early Commercial
- NRHP reference No.: 03001524
- Added to NRHP: January 28, 2004

The Garlock Building, at 522 Mount Rushmore Rd. in Custer, South Dakota, was built in 1890 It was listed on the National Register of Historic Places in 2004.

It is Early Commercial in style.

It was built by Thomas Van Der Vort Garlock, who came to Custer in 1884. He had the two-story brick building constructed to replace a building burnt in a fire in 1890. It first housed a grocery store and a bank on the first floor, and a lodgehall/ballroom on the second. In 1909 the second floor was converted to apartments.
