= Peter Norbeck Summer House =

- Norbeck, Peter, Summer House
- U.S. National Register of Historic Places
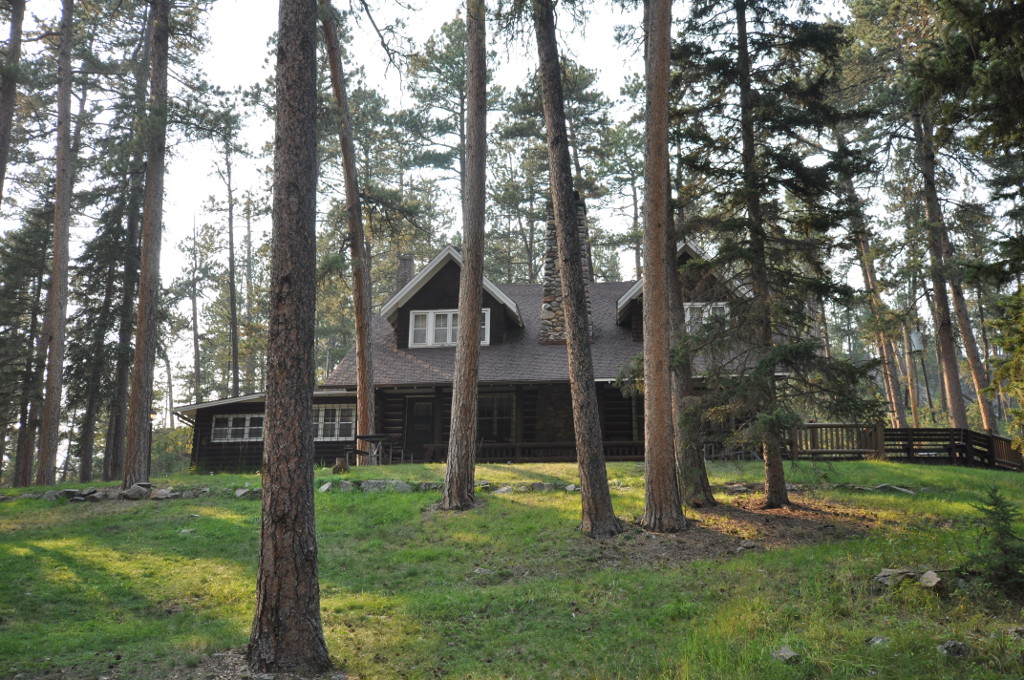

- Location within South Dakota Location within the United States
- Location: Custer State Park, near Custer, South Dakota
- Nearest city: Custer, South Dakota
- Coordinates: 43°48′07″N 103°27′03″W
- Area: 1 acre (0.40 ha)
- Built: 1927
- Built by: Gideon, C.C.
- Architectural style: Log house
- NRHP reference No.: 77001241
- Added to NRHP: September 13, 1977

The Peter Norbeck Summer House, in Custer State Park near Custer, South Dakota, was built in 1927. It was listed on the National Register of Historic Places in 1977. It has also been known as Valhalla.

It is a large one-and-a-half-story log house with saddle-notched corners.

It was deemed significant for its architecture and for its association with Peter Norbeck (1870–1936), a Progressive politician and two-term governor of South Dakota.
