= Buffalo Gap Historic Commercial District =

Historic district in South Dakota, United States

- U.S. National Register of Historic Places
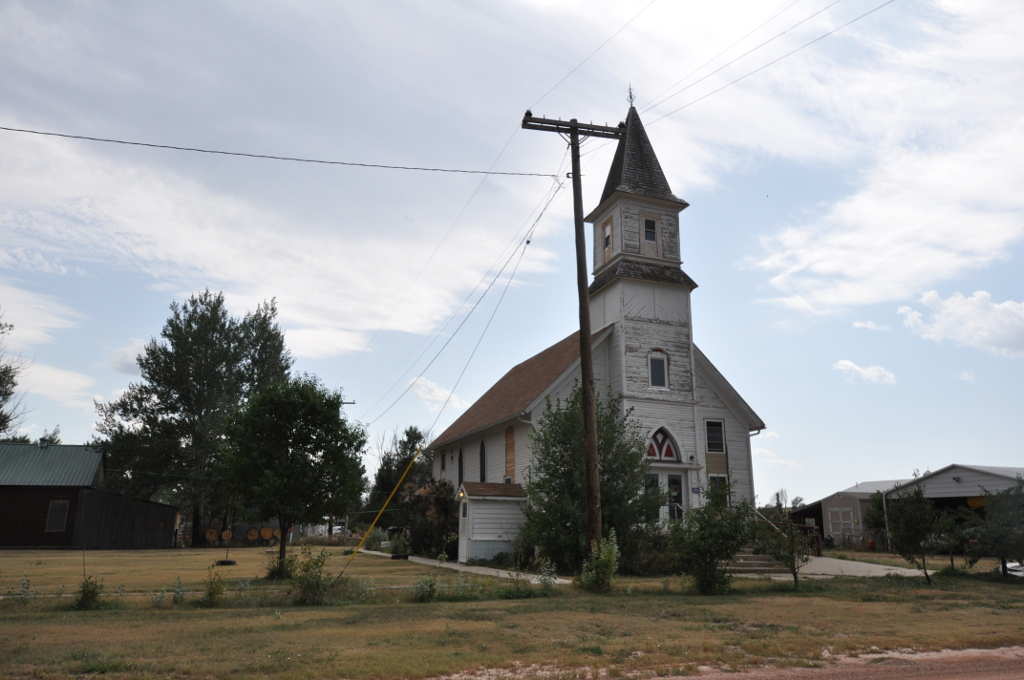
- Church in the Buffalo Gap Historic Commercial District, August 2017

- Location within South Dakota
- Location: Roughly, area surrounding Main, Second and Walnut Sts., Buffalo Gap, South Dakota
- Coordinates: 43°29′31″N 103°18′43″W
- Area: 10 acres (4.0 ha)
- Built: 1886
- Architectural style: Late 19th And Early 20th Century American Movements
- MPS: Rural Resources of Eastern Custer County MPS
- NRHP reference No.: 95000774; 100009859 (decrease)

Significant dates
- Added to NRHP: June 30, 1995
- Boundary decrease: January 29, 2024

The Buffalo Gap Historic Commercial District, is a historic district in Buffalo Gap, South Dakota, United States, that is listed on the National Register of Historic Places (NRHP).

== Description ==
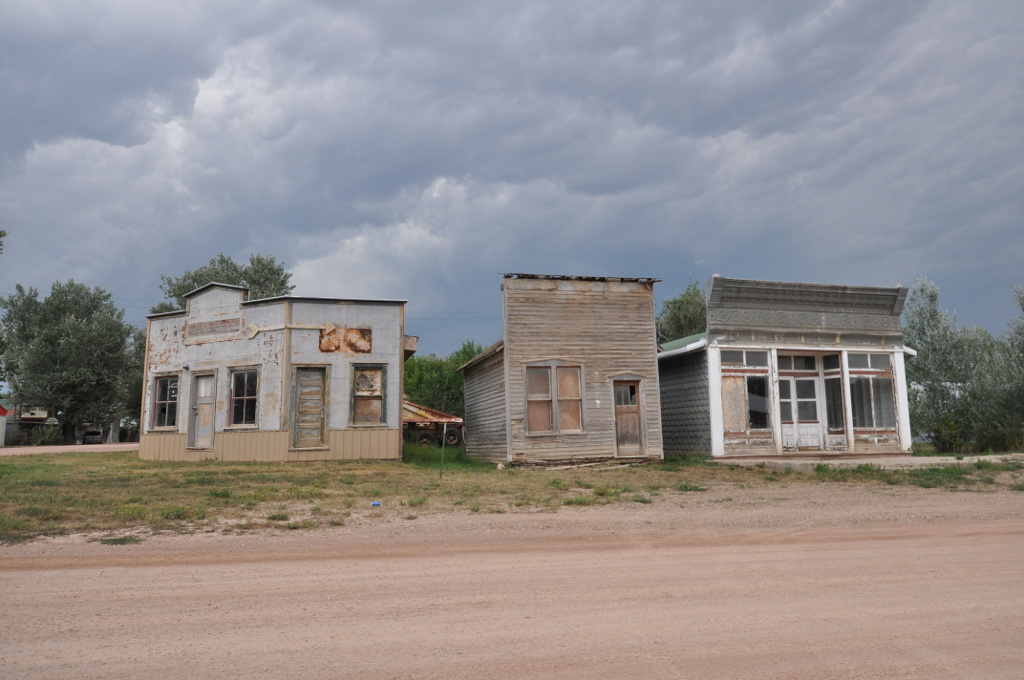
Buildings in the Buffalo Gap Historic Commercial District, August 2017

When first listed, the district covered 10 acres (4.0 ha) and had 25 contributing buildings and two contributing sites.

It included roughly the area surrounding Main, 2nd, and Walnut Streets.

It was added to the NRHP on June 30, 1995. A boundary decrease was approved in January 2024.

== See also ==
- National Register of Historic Places listings in Custer County, South Dakota
