= Burdock, South Dakota =

Ghost town in Fall River County, South Dakota

- Ghost town
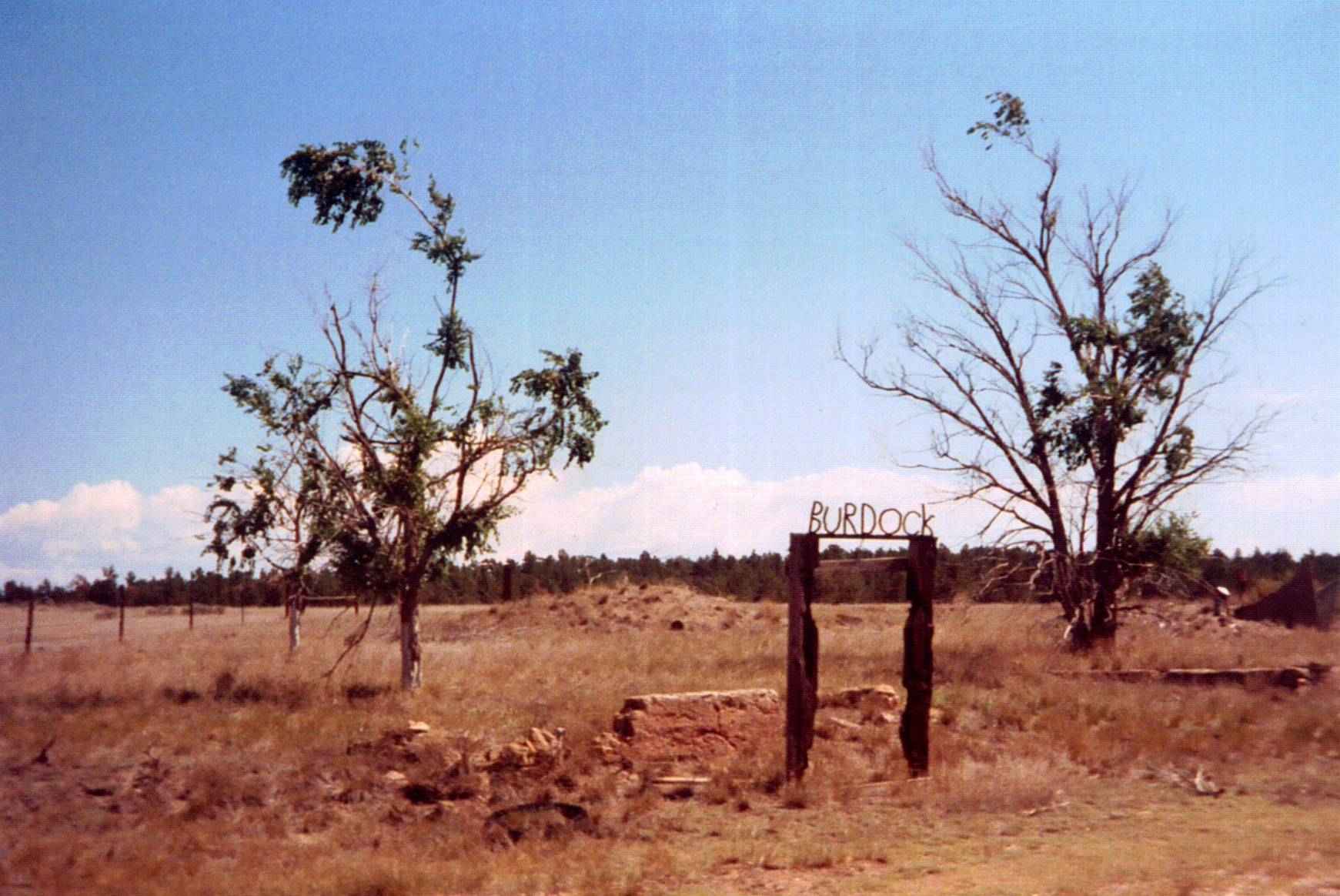
- Wire on wood sign marking the location of Burdock

- Location of Burdock in South Dakota.
- Coordinates: 43°27′11″N 103°59′36″W
- Country: United States
- State: South Dakota
- County: Fall River
- Township: Argentine
- Elevation: 3,642 ft (1,110 m)

Population (2010)
  - Total: 0
- Time zone: UTC-7 (MST)
  - Summer (DST): UTC-6 (MDT)
- Area code: 605
- FIPS code: 46-8590
- GNIS feature ID: 1265622

Burdock is an uninhabited ghost town in Argentine Township in Fall River County, South Dakota, United States.

According to the Federal Writers' Project, the origin of the name Burdock is obscure.

== Geography ==
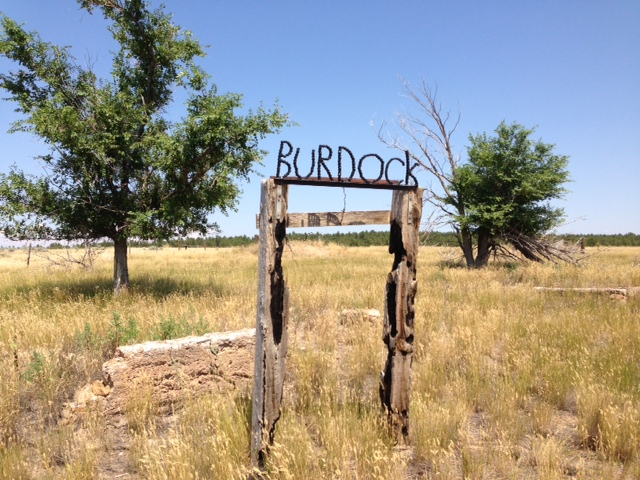
Sign marking Burdock, South Dakota

At this location is the intersection of Fall River County Highway 6463 (Dewey Road) and Township Road B (Argentine Road and Burdock Road). A BNSF Railway line parallels the county highway. In the county's square mile designation, Burdock is closest to 103rd Avenue and 273rd Street. Burdock's nearest neighbors are Dewey to the northwest and Edgemont to the southeast. The border with the state of Wyoming is three miles west, and the Black Hills National Forest extends around the site some three miles to the north, east, and south. The ghost town lies just to the southwest of the Elk Mountains, a small range that is part of the Black Hills. Burdock appears on the South Dakota highway map and Black Hills National Forest map.

== Industry ==
Uranium was found in the area in 1952. It was first produced as early as 1954 by a local group known as Triangle Mining Co., a subsidiary of Edgemont Mining Co. Production consisted of a single, shallow open pit. Triangle Mining also drove an adit from both sides of an exposed ridge to mine a narrow orebody. In about 1960 Susquehanna Western Corp discovered shallow resources sufficient to warrant open pit mining in five or six pits less than 100' deep. Production is estimated to have been approximately 200,000 lbs of uranium oxide. In early 2012, Powertech (USA) Inc. (now called Azarga Uranium Corp.) submitted a proposal to the U.S. Bureau of Land Management to begin mining again.
