= Argentine Township, Fall River County, South Dakota =

Township in Fall River County, South Dakota

Coordinates: 43.42750°N 103.98520°W

Argentine Township is one of the three townships in Fall River County, South Dakota, United States. The majority of the county consists of unorganized territory. Argentine township is located in the northwestern corner of the county, on the Wyoming border. Burdock lies in the center of the township.
