= Wind Cave National Park Administrative and Utility Area Historic District =

Historic district in South Dakota, United States

- U.S. National Register of Historic Places
- U.S. Historic district
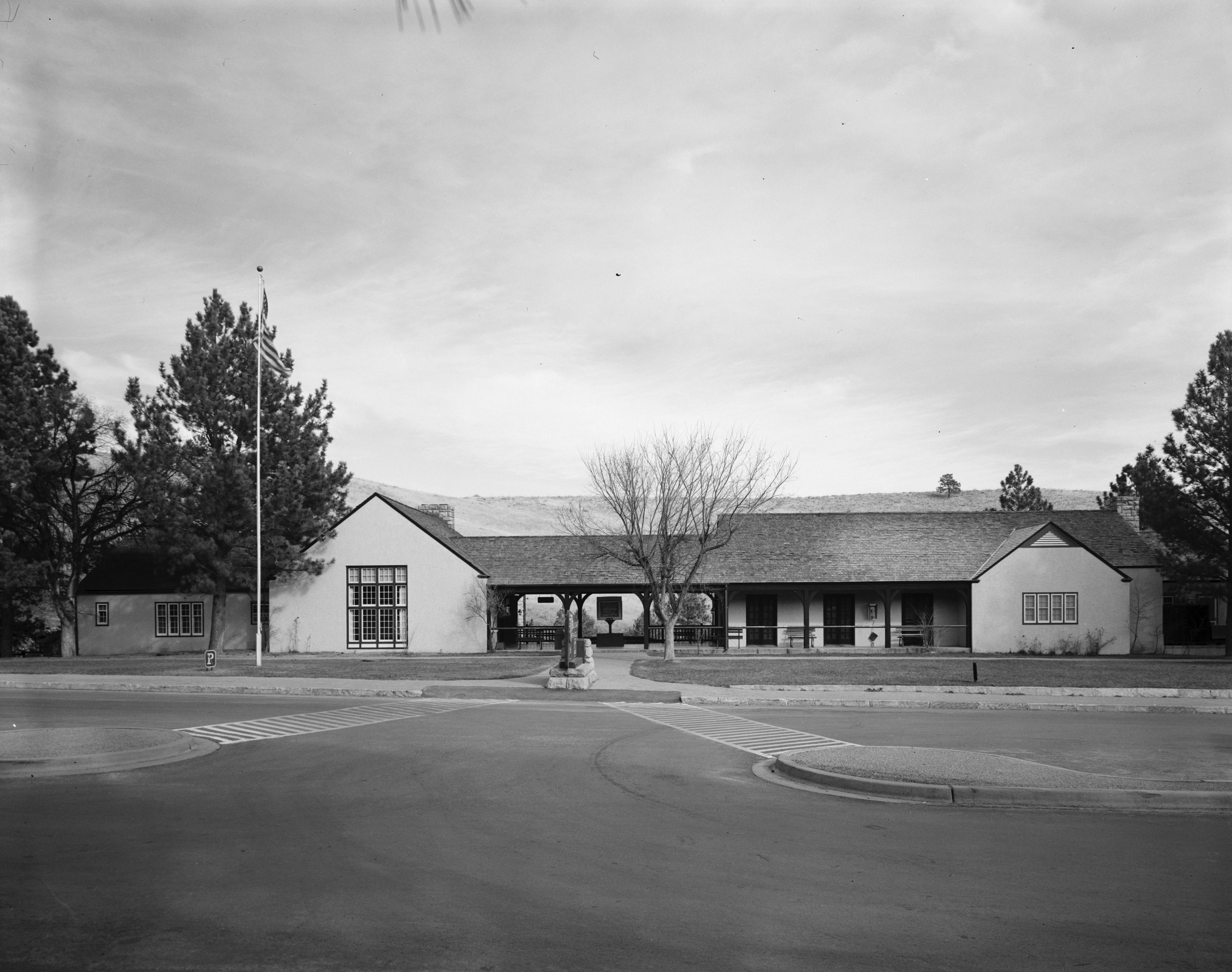
- Administration building

- Location within South Dakota Location within the United States
- Location: E of Custer off US 385, Custer, South Dakota
- Coordinates: 43°33′23″N 103°28′26″W
- Area: 21 acres (8.5 ha)
- Built: 1905
- Architect: Multiple; Baker, Howard
- Architectural style: Bungalow/Craftsman, NPS Rustic
- MPS: Wind Cave National Park MPS (AD)
- NRHP reference No.: 84003259
- Added to NRHP: July 11, 1984

The Wind Cave National Park Administrative and Utility Area Historic District comprises the central portion of Wind Cave National Park in South Dakota. The district centers on the historic entrance to Wind Cave, which is surrounded by park administrative and interpretive structures, most of which were built by the Civilian Conservation Corps in the 1930s.

== History ==
The historic entrance to Wind Cave, discovered in 1881, was modified to allow better access to the natural entrance by blasting. Between 1892 and 1894, a new passage was created by blasting to allow visitor access, with another entrance blasted in 1936 by the CCC. The same year, a visitor center was built a short distance away overlooking the stream valley behind. Auxiliary buildings include the 1905 Superintendent's Cottage, the 1934 Superintendent's Residence, several employee residences, a ranger dormitory and mess hall, and other structures, mostly dating to the 1930s. The planned landscape blends with its environment, using a modified version of the National Park Service Rustic style.

The district was listed on the National Register of Historic Places on July 11, 1984.
