= Custer High School (Custer, South Dakota) =

Custer Junior/Senior High School

Location
- 1645 Wildcat Lane; Custer, South Dakota 57730; United States; 43°45′55″N 103°34′53″W

Information
- Type: Public
- Motto: "Go Wildcats!"
- School district: Custer School District 16-1
- Principal: Tobey Cass
- Staff: 20.32 (FTE)
- Grades: 9-12
- Enrollment: 262 (2023-24)
- Student to teacher ratio: 12.89
- Colors: Purple and gold
- Mascot: Wildcats
- School song: "Our Director"
- Website: jrsr.csd.k12.sd.us/o/jrsr

Custer High School is a high school in Custer, South Dakota, United States. It is located in the Black Hills just west of Custer State Park on Hwy 16. The principal is Tobey Cass. The school mascot is the Wildcats. They use a 4-day school week system, with classes going from Monday thru Thursday.

Fine art activities include Oral Interpretation, Student Council, Yearbook, Newspaper, Drama, Knowledge Bowl, National Honor Society, Vocal Music, Swing Choir, Instrumental Music, Pep Band, Drum Line, Destination Imagination, Improv, Peer Assistance, SADD, Fellowship of Christian Athletes. Sports include cross country, track & field, football, basketball, volleyball, wrestling, cheerleading, soccer, and golf.
