= Elk Mountains (South Dakota) =

Mountain range in South Dakota and Wyoming, United States

- Elk Mountain Range
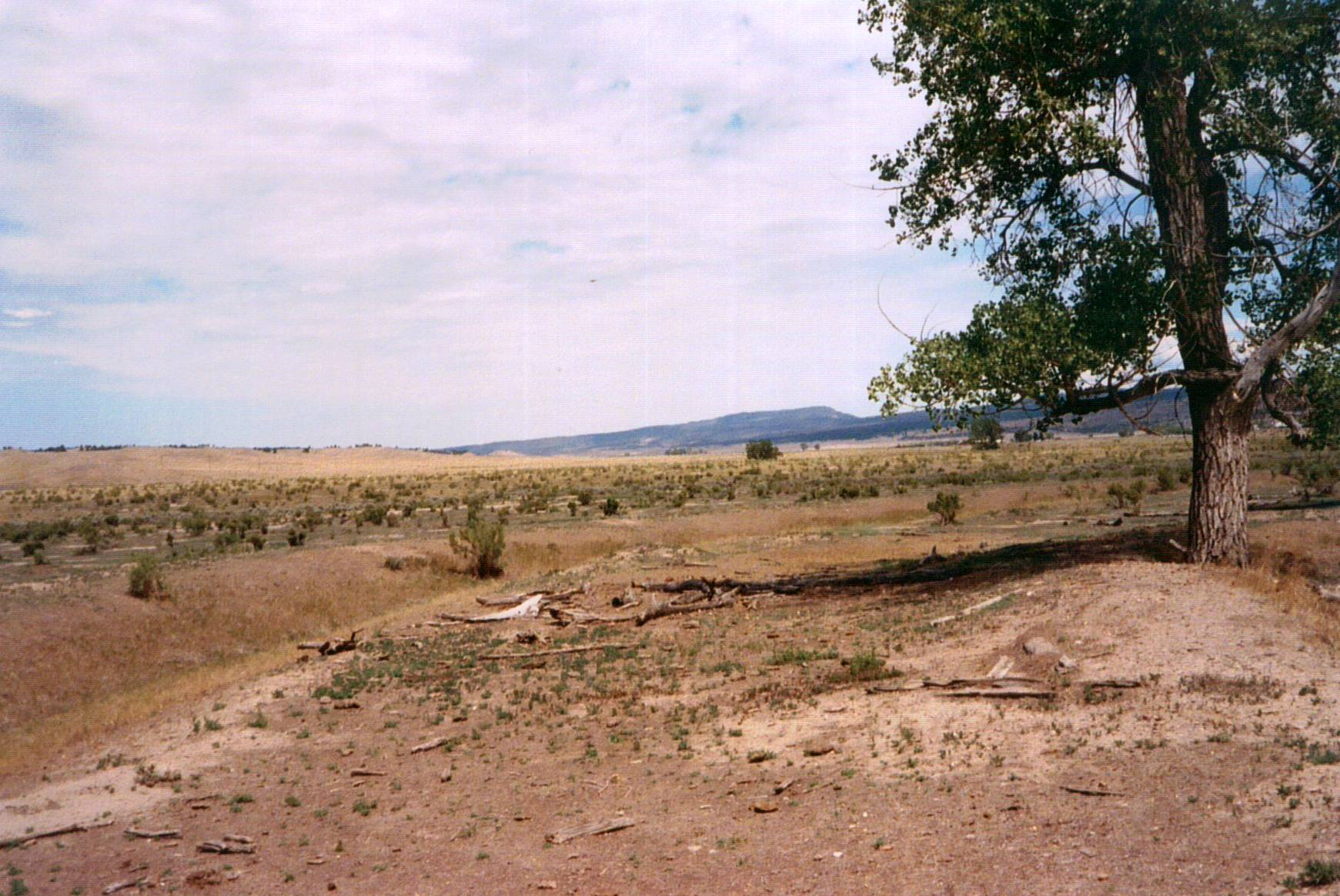
- The Elk Mountains seen from the dry prairie near Dewey.

Highest point
- Peak: Elk Mountain
- Elevation: 1,726 m (5,663 ft)at the Elk Mountain Lookout Tower
- Coordinates: 43°43′27″N 104°02′29″W

Dimensions
- Length: 55 km (34 mi) NW-SE
- Width: 6 km (3.7 mi)

Geography
- Location within South Dakota
- Country: United States
- States: South Dakota and Wyoming
- Parent range: Black Hills

Geology
- Rock age: Early Cretaceous
- Rock type: Inyan Kara rock

The Elk Mountains are a small range of mountains in western South Dakota, forming the southwest portion of the Black Hills as part of its west-dipping monocline. They are geologically distinct from the Black Hills, on the other side of a "racetrack" region of red stone. The ridge of the Elk Mountains is formed of harder sandstones. The east face of the Elk Mountains is a 300-to-800-foot (91 to 244 m) high escarpment, but the west portion falls slowly and features many canyons.

Most of the Elk Mountains were protected in the Harney National Forest until 1954, when this protected area joined the Black Hills National Forest. Today the large South Dakota portion of the mountain range is in the Hell Canyon District of the Black Hills National Forest, while the much smaller Wyoming portion lies in the Bearlodge District. The Elk Mountains are one of three mountain ranges that comprise the Black Hills region and national forest, including the Black Hills itself and Wyoming's Bear Lodge Mountains.

Elk Mountain is the highest point of the range and has a lookout tower on its summit. Other peaks include Pilger Mountain and Sullivan Peak.

Few people live in or near the Elk Mountains. The closest town is Edgemont, South Dakota, to the south. Tiny unincorporated Dewey and ghost town Burdock lie to the west. Ten miles to the northwest is Newcastle, Wyoming.

== Habitat ==
Pinus ponderosa trees are predominant with nearly complete undergrowth of Carex heliophila.

== Gallery ==
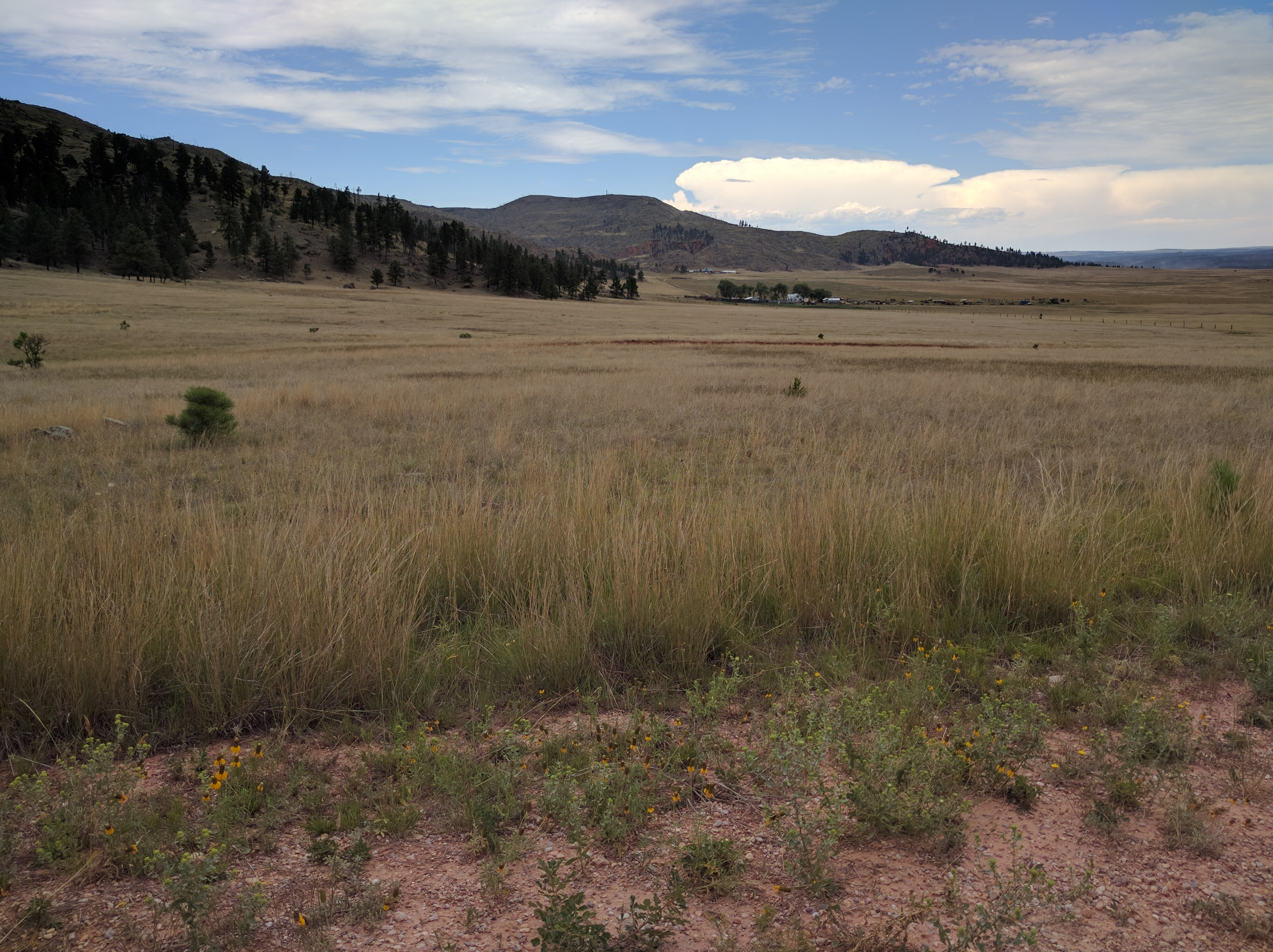
Elk Mountain from prairie

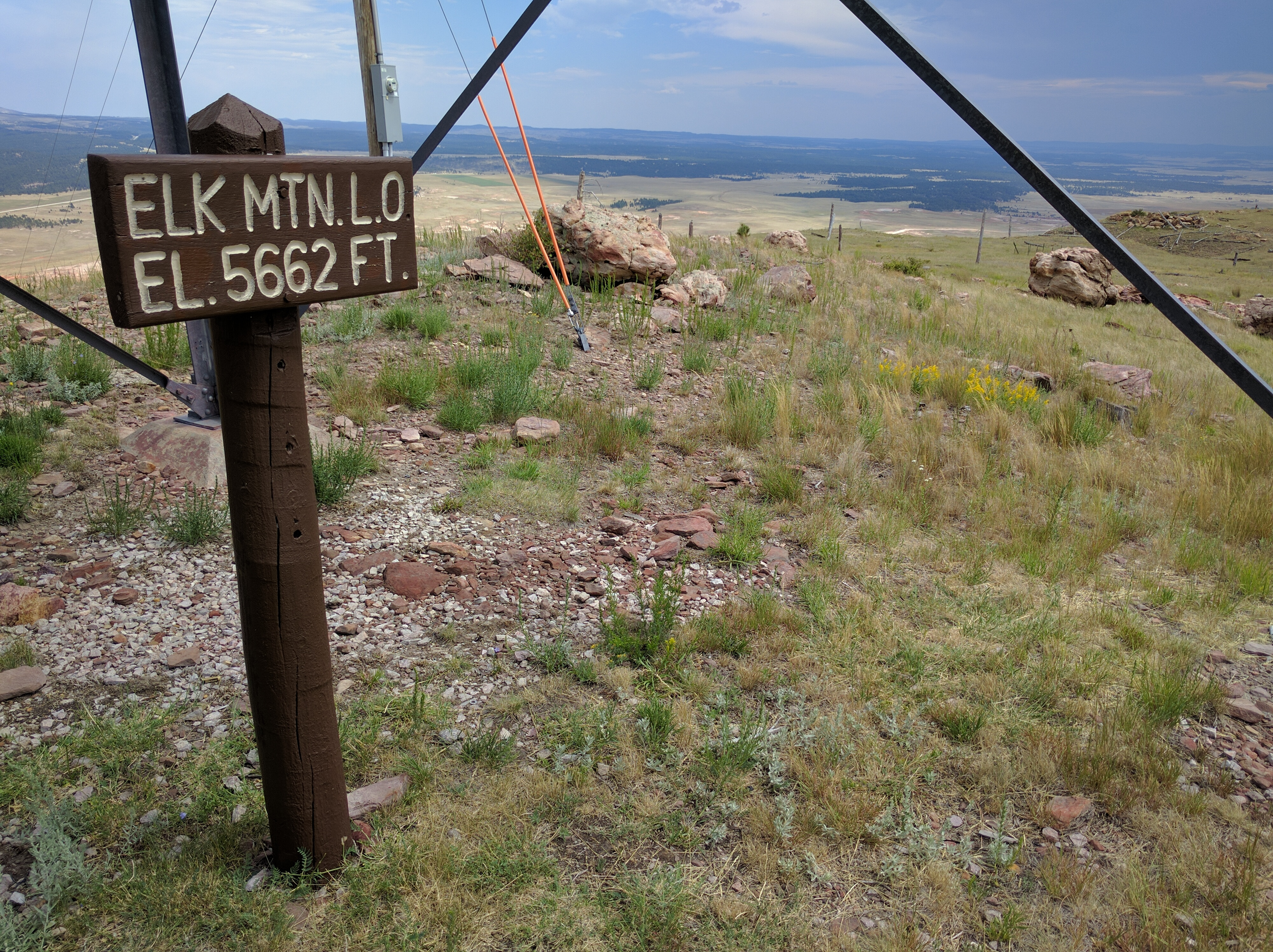
Elevation sign at lookout tower

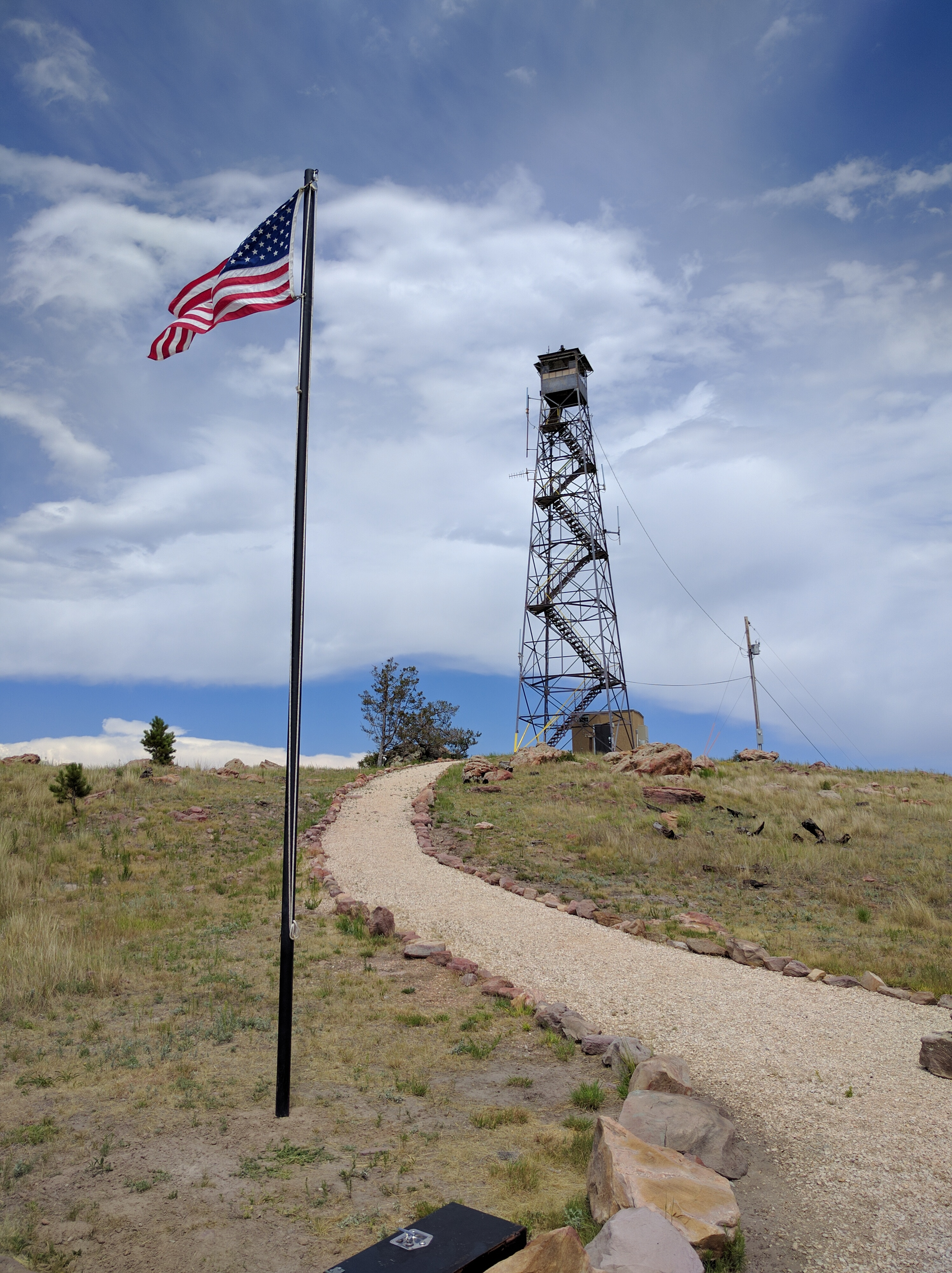
Elk Mountain fire lookout tower
