= Pig Tail Bridge =

- U.S. National Register of Historic Places
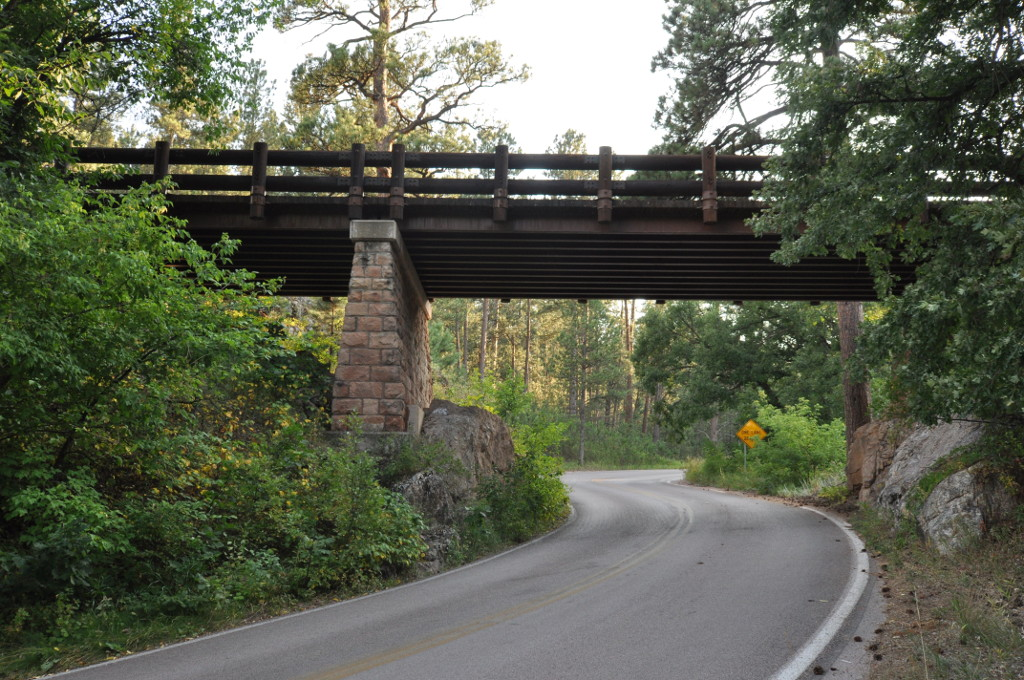

- Location within South Dakota Location within the United States
- Nearest city: Hot Springs, South Dakota
- Coordinates: 43°36′04″N 103°29′38″W
- Built: 1930
- Built by: South Dakota Department of Transportation
- Architectural style: Rustic
- MPS: Historic Bridges in South Dakota MPS
- NRHP reference No.: 95000344
- Added to NRHP: April 7, 1995

The Pig Tail Bridge is a bridge in Custer County, South Dakota, United States, which was built around 1930. Located in Wind Cave National Park, it is a spiral bridge. It was listed on the National Register of Historic Places in 1995.

The Pig Tail Bridge was built to develop South Dakota Highway 87, of which it is part. The bridge is 160 feet (49 m) long and 20 feet (6.1 m) wide.
