= Custer County Courthouse (South Dakota) =

Historic government building in South Dakota, United States

- U.S. National Register of Historic Places

- Location within South Dakota Location within the United States
- Interactive map showing the location of Custer County Courthouse
- Location: 411 Mt. Rushmore Rd., Custer, South Dakota
- Coordinates: 43°45′59″N 103°36′04″W
- Area: 0.3 acres (0.12 ha)
- Built: 1881
- Architectural style: Italianate
- NRHP reference No.: 72001226
- Added to NRHP: November 27, 1972

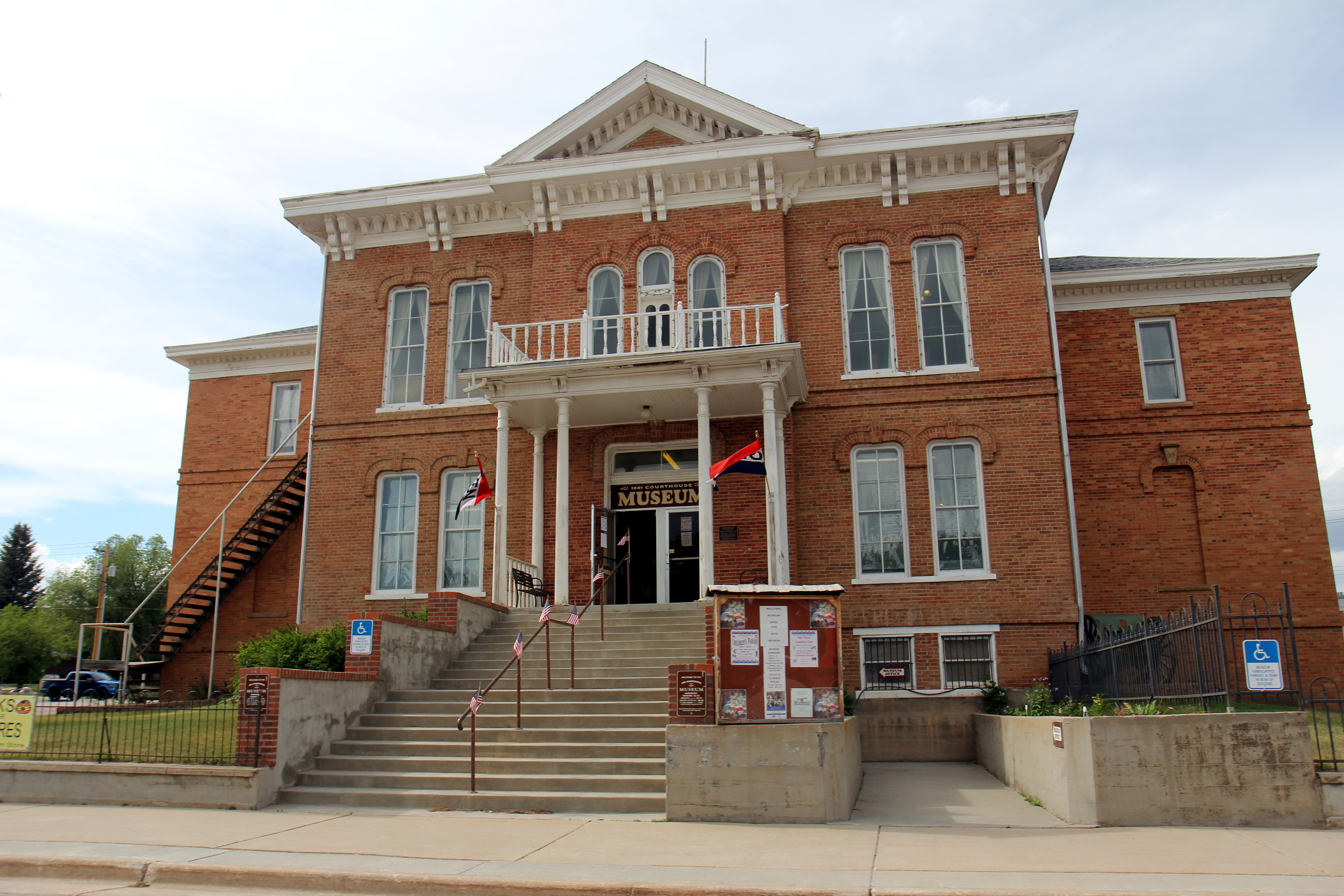
Front view

The Custer County Courthouse in Custer, South Dakota is a courthouse built in 1881. It was listed on the National Register of Historic Places in 1972.

It is a three-story red brick building "reflecting a plains adaptation of the Italian style.

A new courthouse was scheduled to be completed in 1993.
