= Fairburn, South Dakota =

- Town
- Location in Custer County and the state of South Dakota
- Coordinates: 43°41′13″N 103°12′31″W
- Country: United States
- State: South Dakota
- County: Custer
- Incorporated: 1919

Area
  - Total: 0.33 sq mi (0.85 km^{2})
  - Land: 0.33 sq mi (0.85 km^{2})
  - Water: 0 sq mi (0.00 km^{2})
- Elevation: 3,297 ft (1,005 m)

Population (2020)
  - Total: 60
  - Density: 183.6/sq mi (70.87/km^{2})
- Time zone: UTC-7 (MST)
  - Summer (DST): UTC-6 (MDT)
- Zip Code: 57738
- Area code: 605
- FIPS code: 46-20340
- GNIS feature ID: 1267385

Fairburn (/ˈfɛərbɜːrn/) is a town in Custer County, South Dakota, United States. The population was 60 at the 2020 census.

== History ==
Fairburn was platted in 1886. The town was named from its location on a stream, burn being a Scottish word meaning "creek". A post office has been in operation in Fairburn since 1887.

== Geography ==
According to the United States Census Bureau, the town has a total area of 0.33 square miles (0.85 km^{2}), all land.

== Demographics ==
Historical population
| Census | Pop. | Note | %± |
|---|---|---|---|
| 1930 | 91 | | — |
| 1940 | 120 | | 31.9% |
| 1950 | 80 | | −33.3% |
| 1960 | 47 | | −41.2% |
| 1970 | 50 | | 6.4% |
| 1980 | 41 | | −18.0% |
| 1990 | 62 | | 51.2% |
| 2000 | 80 | | 29.0% |
| 2010 | 85 | | 6.3% |
| 2020 | 60 | | −29.4% |
U.S. Decennial Census

=== 2010 census ===
As of the census of 2010, there were 85 people, 39 households, and 23 families living in the town. The population density was 257.6 inhabitants per square mile (99.5/km^{2}). There were 47 housing units at an average density of 142.4 per square mile (55.0/km^{2}). The racial makeup of the town was 91.8% White, 2.4% African American, 1.2% Native American, and 4.7% from two or more races. Hispanic or Latino of any race were 1.2% of the population.

There were 39 households, of which 20.5% had children under the age of 18 living with them, 48.7% were married couples living together, 5.1% had a female householder with no husband present, 5.1% had a male householder with no wife present, and 41.0% were non-families. 33.3% of all households were made up of individuals, and 5.1% had someone living alone who was 65 years of age or older. The average household size was 2.18 and the average family size was 2.87.

The median age in the town was 45.1 years. 23.5% of residents were under the age of 18; 5.9% were between the ages of 18 and 24; 20% were from 25 to 44; 36.5% were from 45 to 64; and 14.1% were 65 years of age or older. The gender makeup of the town was 50.6% male and 49.4% female.

=== 2000 census ===
As of the census of 2000, there were 80 people, 34 households, and 22 families living in the town. The population density was 242.9 inhabitants per square mile (93.8/km^{2}). There were 41 housing units at an average density of 124.5 per square mile (48.1/km^{2}). The racial makeup of the town was 98.75% White and 1.25% African American.

There were 34 households, out of which 32.4% had children under the age of 18 living with them, 55.9% were married couples living together, 5.9% had a female householder with no husband present, and 32.4% were non-families. 29.4% of all households were made up of individuals, and 17.6% had someone living alone who was 65 years of age or older. The average household size was 2.35 and the average family size was 2.96.

In the town, the population was spread out, with 23.8% under the age of 18, 7.5% from 18 to 24, 28.8% from 25 to 44, 22.5% from 45 to 64, and 17.5% who were 65 years of age or older. The median age was 39 years. For every 100 females, there were 116.2 males. For every 100 females age 18 and over, there were 117.9 males.

The median income for a household in the town was $23,750, and the median income for a family was $33,125. Males had a median income of $23,125 versus $33,750 for females. The per capita income for the town was $20,832. There were 9.5% of families and 10.0% of the population living below the poverty line, including no under eighteens and none of those over 64.
