= Buffalo Gap, South Dakota =

Buffalo Gap, South Dakota Pté Tȟathíyopa Otȟúŋwahe
- Town
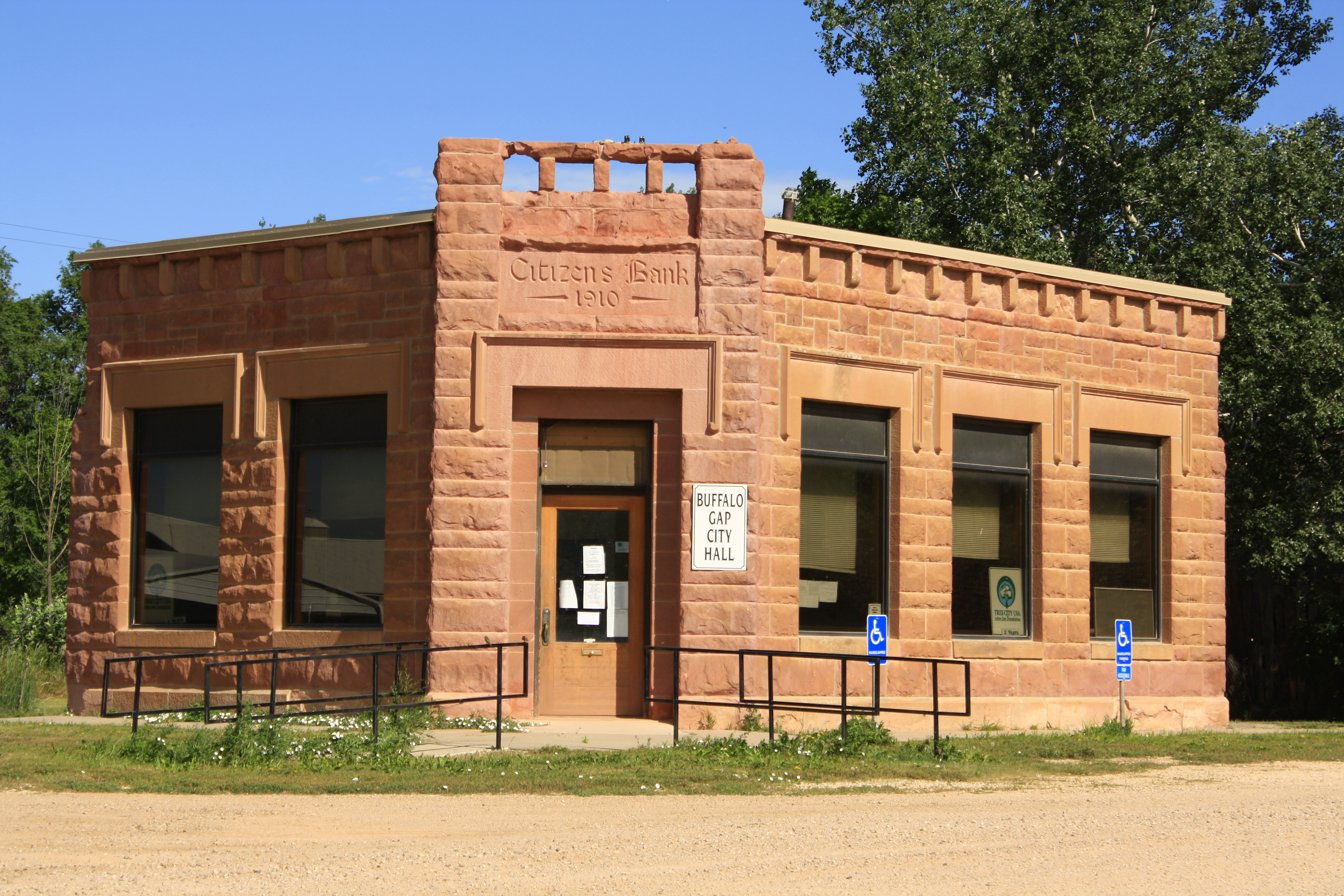
- Buffalo Gap Town Hall, July 2011

- Location in Custer County and the state of South Dakota
- Coordinates: 43°29′32″N 103°18′55″W
- Country: United States
- State: South Dakota
- County: Custer

Area
  - Total: 0.31 sq mi (0.79 km^{2})
  - Land: 0.31 sq mi (0.79 km^{2})
  - Water: 0 sq mi (0.00 km^{2})
- Elevation: 3,268 ft (996 m)

Population (2020)
  - Total: 131
  - Density: 429/sq mi (165.5/km^{2})
- Time zone: UTC-7 (MST)
  - Summer (DST): UTC-6 (MDT)
- Zip Code: 57722
- Area code: 605
- FIPS code: 46-08340
- GNIS feature ID: 1267303

Buffalo Gap (Lakota: Pté Tȟathíyopa Otȟúŋwahe; "buffalo gap village") is a town in Custer County, South Dakota, United States. The population was 131 at the 2020 census.

== History ==
A very old western South Dakota town, Buffalo Gap was founded in 1877. By 1885, it was a railroad spur for the Fremont, Elkhorn and Missouri Valley Railroad line, with more than 1,200 residents. Today, the town has about 180 residents.

In its early years it was one of the largest towns in South Dakota, but it received the same fate as many other towns of that era. A resident's cow kicked over a lantern and it burned the town to the ground, as happened with the Great Chicago Fire and many others. The town never fully recovered and was never rebuilt to its former grandeur.

The name comes from a gap to the west of town that sheltered buffalo herds in earlier times. Although Buffalo Gap burned down several times, there are a number of historic buildings still standing. Located on State Hwy 79 between Hermosa and Hot Springs, Buffalo Gap intersects with County Road 656, an “off the beaten path” that travelers can take into the Buffalo Gap National Grasslands, Badlands National Park and the Pine Ridge Indian Reservation

Part of the action of the French book La Brèche aux buffles takes place in Buffalo Gap.

== Geography ==
According to the United States Census Bureau, the town has a total area of 0.31 square miles (0.80 km^{2}), all land.

== Demographics ==
Historical population
Census	Pop.	Note	%±
1910	280		—
1920	132		−52.9%
1930	183		38.6%
1940	182		−0.5%
1950	186		2.2%
1960	194		4.3%
1970	155		−20.1%
1980	186		20.0%
1990	173		−7.0%
2000	164		−5.2%
2010	126		−23.2%
2020	131		4.0%
U.S. Decennial Census

=== 2010 census ===
As of the census of 2010, there were 126 people, 66 households, and 32 families living in the town. The population density was 406.5 inhabitants per square mile (157.0/km^{2}). There were 85 housing units at an average density of 274.2 per square mile (105.9/km^{2}). The racial makeup of the town was 91.3% White, 7.1% Native American, 0.8% from other races, and 0.8% from two or more races. Hispanic or Latino of any race were 0.8% of the population.

There were 66 households, of which 16.7% had children under the age of 18 living with them, 39.4% were married couples living together, 3.0% had a female householder with no husband present, 6.1% had a male householder with no wife present, and 51.5% were non-families. 43.9% of all households were made up of individuals, and 19.7% had someone living alone who was 65 years of age or older. The average household size was 1.91 and the average family size was 2.63.

The median age in the town was 53 years. 16.7% of residents were under the age of 18; 2.5% were between the ages of 18 and 24; 15.2% were from 25 to 44; 41.2% were from 45 to 64; and 24.6% were 65 years of age or older. The gender makeup of the town was 57.1% male and 42.9% female.

=== 2000 census ===
As of the census of 2000, there were 164 people, 75 households, and 44 families living in the town. The population density was 842.9 inhabitants per square mile (325.4/km^{2}). There were 88 housing units at an average density of 452.3 per square mile (174.6/km^{2}). The racial makeup of the town was 90.85% White, 6.71% Native American, and 2.44% from two or more races. Hispanic or Latino of any race were 4.88% of the population.

There were 75 households, out of which 26.7% had children under the age of 18 living with them, 48.0% were married couples living together, 8.0% had a female householder with no husband present, and 41.3% were non-families. 40.0% of all households were made up of individuals, and 10.7% had someone living alone who was 65 years of age or older. The average household size was 2.19 and the average family size was 2.91.

In the town, the population was spread out, with 25.0% under the age of 18, 4.9% from 18 to 24, 18.3% from 25 to 44, 35.4% from 45 to 64, and 16.5% who were 65 years of age or older. The median age was 46 years. For every 100 females, there were 84.3 males. For every 100 females age 18 and over, there were 86.4 males.

The median income for a household in the town was $25,000, and the median income for a family was $28,750. Males had a median income of $21,250 versus $16,250 for females. The per capita income for the town was $14,680. About 18.0% of families and 18.7% of the population were below the poverty line, including 29.6% of those under the age of eighteen and 12.5% of those 65 or over.

== Notable person ==
- Rex Putnam, Oregon Superintendent of Public Instruction

== See also ==
- List of towns in South Dakota
- Buffalo Gap Historic Commercial District
