= Custer County, South Dakota =

County in South Dakota, United States

- County
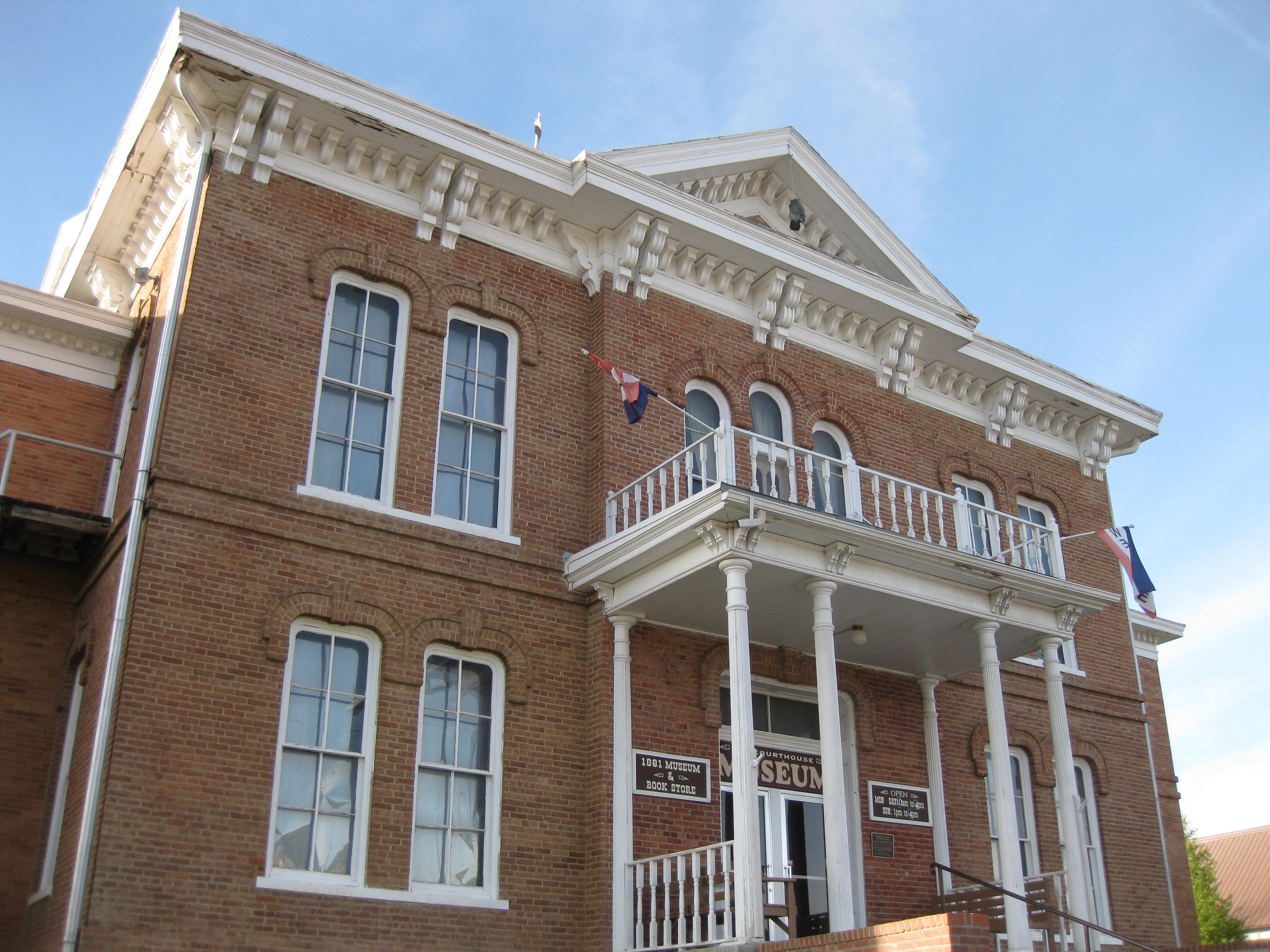
- Custer County Courthouse

- Seal

- Location within the U.S. state of South Dakota
- Coordinates: 43°41′N 103°28′W
- Country: United States
- State: South Dakota
- Created: 1875
- Organized: 1877
- Named for: George Armstrong Custer
- Seat: Custer
- Largest city: Custer

Area
  - Total: 1,559 sq mi (4,040 km^{2})
  - Land: 1,557 sq mi (4,030 km^{2})
  - Water: 2.1 sq mi (5.4 km^{2}) 0.1%

Population (2020)
  - Total: 8,318
  - Estimate (2025): 9,431 ▲
  - Density: 5.342/sq mi (2.063/km^{2})
- Time zone: UTC−7 (Mountain)
  - Summer (DST): UTC−6 (MDT)
- Congressional district: At-large
- Website: www.custercountysd.com

Custer County is a county in the U.S. state of South Dakota. As of the 2020 census, the population was 8,318. Its county seat is Custer. The county was created in 1875, and was organized in 1877. It was named after General George Armstrong Custer.

Custer County is home to two of the three longest caves in the United States: Jewel Cave National Monument and Wind Cave National Park.

== Geography ==
Custer County lies on the west line of South Dakota. Its west boundary line abuts the east boundary line of the state of Wyoming. The Cheyenne River flows northeastward along the upper portion of the county's east boundary. Battle Creek flows southeastward in the upper eastern part of the county, discharging into Cheyenne River along the county's northeastern boundary line. Spring Creek flows northeastward through the upper eastern part of the county, discharging into the river just north of the county border. The county terrain is mountainous, especially its western portion. The terrain slopes to the east; its lowest point is its NE corner at 2,461 ft (750 m) above sea level (ASL). Its highest point is a mountain crest along the north boundary line, at 6,657 ft (2,029 m) ASL.

Custer County has a total area of 1,559 square miles (4,040 km^{2}), of which 1,557 square miles (4,030 km^{2}) is land and 2.1 square miles (5.4 km^{2}) (0.1%) is water.

=== Major highways ===
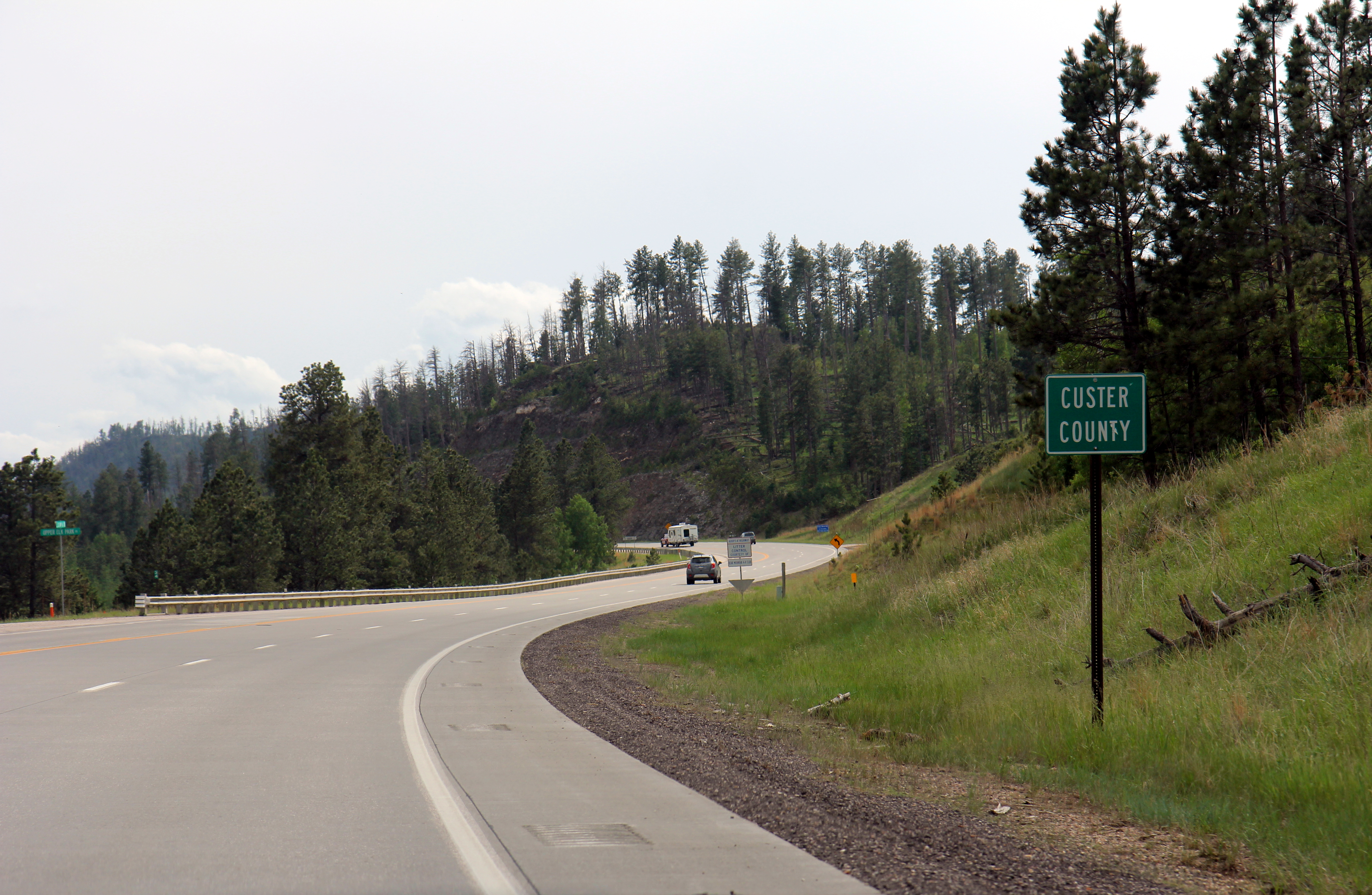
Custer County sign on US16/US385

- U.S. Highway 16
- U.S. Highway 385
- U.S. Highway 16A
- South Dakota Highway 36
- South Dakota Highway 40
- South Dakota Highway 79
- South Dakota Highway 87
- South Dakota Highway 89

=== Adjacent counties ===
- Pennington County – north
- Oglala Lakota County – southeast
- Fall River County – south
- Niobrara County, Wyoming – southwest
- Weston County, Wyoming – west

=== Protected areas ===
- Black Hills National Forest (part)
  - Black Elk Wilderness (part)
- Buffalo Gap National Grassland (part)
- Custer State Park
- Jewel Cave National Monument
- Wind Cave National Park

== Demographics ==
Historical population
| Census | Pop. | Note | %± |
|---|---|---|---|
| 1880 | 995 | | — |
| 1890 | 4,891 | | 391.6% |
| 1900 | 2,728 | | −44.2% |
| 1910 | 4,458 | | 63.4% |
| 1920 | 3,907 | | −12.4% |
| 1930 | 5,353 | | 37.0% |
| 1940 | 6,023 | | 12.5% |
| 1950 | 5,517 | | −8.4% |
| 1960 | 4,906 | | −11.1% |
| 1970 | 4,698 | | −4.2% |
| 1980 | 6,000 | | 27.7% |
| 1990 | 6,179 | | 3.0% |
| 2000 | 7,275 | | 17.7% |
| 2010 | 8,216 | | 12.9% |
| 2020 | 8,318 | | 1.2% |
| 2025 (est.) | 9,431 | ▲ | 13.4% |
U.S. Decennial Census; 1790–1960 1900–1990; 1990–2000 2010–2020

=== 2020 census ===
As of the 2020 census, there were 8,318 people, 3,794 households, and 2,552 families residing in the county. The population density was 5.3 inhabitants per square mile (2.0/km^{2}). There were 4,837 housing units.

Of the residents, 16.7% were under the age of 18 and 32.7% were 65 years of age or older; the median age was 56.4 years. For every 100 females there were 100.2 males, and for every 100 females age 18 and over there were 98.8 males.

The racial makeup of the county was 91.2% White, 0.4% Black or African American, 2.1% American Indian and Alaska Native, 0.3% Asian, 1.0% from some other race, and 5.0% from two or more races. Hispanic or Latino residents of any race comprised 2.5% of the population.

There were 3,794 households, of which 18.4% had children under the age of 18 living with them and 19.2% had a female householder with no spouse or partner present. About 28.0% of all households were made up of individuals and 14.8% had someone living alone who was 65 years of age or older.

There were 4,837 housing units, of which 21.6% were vacant. Among occupied housing units, 81.3% were owner-occupied and 18.7% were renter-occupied. The homeowner vacancy rate was 1.8% and the rental vacancy rate was 7.8%.

=== 2010 census ===
As of the 2010 census, there were 8,216 people, 3,636 households, and 2,427 families in the county. The population density was 5.3 inhabitants per square mile (2.0/km^{2}). There were 4,628 housing units at an average density of 3.0 units per square mile (1.2 units/km^{2}). The racial makeup of the county was 94.2% white, 2.9% American Indian, 0.4% Asian, 0.2% black or African American, 0.4% from other races, and 2.0% from two or more races. Those of Hispanic or Latino origin made up 2.2% of the population. In terms of ancestry, 42.1% were German, 13.1% were Irish, 11.4% were English, 10.8% were Norwegian, and 7.9% were American.

Of the 3,636 households, 21.7% had children under the age of 18 living with them, 58.2% were married couples living together, 5.5% had a female householder with no husband present, 33.3% were non-families, and 28.4% of all households were made up of individuals. The average household size was 2.19 and the average family size was 2.65. The median age was 50.3 years.

The median income for a household in the county was $46,743 and the median income for a family was $58,253. Males had a median income of $39,194 versus $29,375 for females. The per capita income for the county was $24,353. About 4.3% of families and 9.7% of the population were below the poverty line, including 10.9% of those under age 18 and 11.7% of those age 65 or over.

== Communities ==
=== City ===
- Custer (county seat)

=== Towns ===
- Buffalo Gap (Population: 131)
- Fairburn (Population: 60)
- Hermosa (Population: 382)
- Pringle (Population: 109)

=== Unincorporated communities ===
- Dewey
- Four Mile

=== Townships ===
The county is divided into two areas of territory:

- East of Custer State Park
- West of Custer State Park

== Politics ==
Custer County voters are strongly Republican. In only one national election since 1936 has the county selected the Democratic Party candidate.

United States presidential election results for Custer County, South Dakota
| Year | Republican | | Democratic | | Third party(ies) | |
| Year | No. | % | No. | % | No. | % |
|---|---|---|---|---|---|---|
| 1892 | 503 | 49.27% | 166 | 16.26% | 352 | 34.48% |
| 1896 | 429 | 45.30% | 515 | 54.38% | 3 | 0.32% |
| 1900 | 483 | 53.37% | 415 | 45.86% | 7 | 0.77% |
| 1904 | 536 | 65.53% | 228 | 27.87% | 54 | 6.60% |
| 1908 | 487 | 49.39% | 428 | 43.41% | 71 | 7.20% |
| 1912 | 0 | 0.00% | 419 | 45.89% | 494 | 54.11% |
| 1916 | 392 | 42.11% | 488 | 52.42% | 51 | 5.48% |
| 1920 | 784 | 60.82% | 383 | 29.71% | 122 | 9.46% |
| 1924 | 833 | 53.36% | 236 | 15.12% | 492 | 31.52% |
| 1928 | 1,464 | 66.85% | 715 | 32.65% | 11 | 0.50% |
| 1932 | 977 | 38.05% | 1,548 | 60.28% | 43 | 1.67% |
| 1936 | 1,365 | 46.88% | 1,519 | 52.16% | 28 | 0.96% |
| 1940 | 1,796 | 60.94% | 1,151 | 39.06% | 0 | 0.00% |
| 1944 | 1,288 | 64.40% | 712 | 35.60% | 0 | 0.00% |
| 1948 | 1,217 | 56.66% | 917 | 42.69% | 14 | 0.65% |
| 1952 | 1,725 | 72.57% | 652 | 27.43% | 0 | 0.00% |
| 1956 | 1,514 | 63.96% | 853 | 36.04% | 0 | 0.00% |
| 1960 | 1,533 | 63.58% | 878 | 36.42% | 0 | 0.00% |
| 1964 | 1,142 | 49.27% | 1,176 | 50.73% | 0 | 0.00% |
| 1968 | 1,143 | 55.38% | 727 | 35.22% | 194 | 9.40% |
| 1972 | 1,476 | 64.48% | 798 | 34.86% | 15 | 0.66% |
| 1976 | 1,373 | 57.09% | 995 | 41.37% | 37 | 1.54% |
| 1980 | 2,057 | 69.61% | 708 | 23.96% | 190 | 6.43% |
| 1984 | 2,183 | 71.27% | 858 | 28.01% | 22 | 0.72% |
| 1988 | 1,806 | 59.49% | 1,180 | 38.87% | 50 | 1.65% |
| 1992 | 1,422 | 42.28% | 1,078 | 32.05% | 863 | 25.66% |
| 1996 | 1,740 | 51.83% | 1,122 | 33.42% | 495 | 14.75% |
| 2000 | 2,495 | 69.83% | 955 | 26.73% | 123 | 3.44% |
| 2004 | 2,922 | 67.89% | 1,272 | 29.55% | 110 | 2.56% |
| 2008 | 2,909 | 64.54% | 1,475 | 32.73% | 123 | 2.73% |
| 2012 | 3,062 | 67.74% | 1,335 | 29.54% | 123 | 2.72% |
| 2016 | 3,293 | 69.75% | 1,121 | 23.74% | 307 | 6.50% |
| 2020 | 3,852 | 70.11% | 1,522 | 27.70% | 120 | 2.18% |
| 2024 | 4,313 | 71.87% | 1,567 | 26.11% | 121 | 2.02% |

== Education ==
School districts include:

- Custer School District 16-1
- Elk Mountain School District 16-2
- Hot Springs School District 23-2

== See also ==
- National Register of Historic Places listings in Custer County, South Dakota
- Crazy Horse Memorial
