= Custer, South Dakota =

- City
- City of Custer
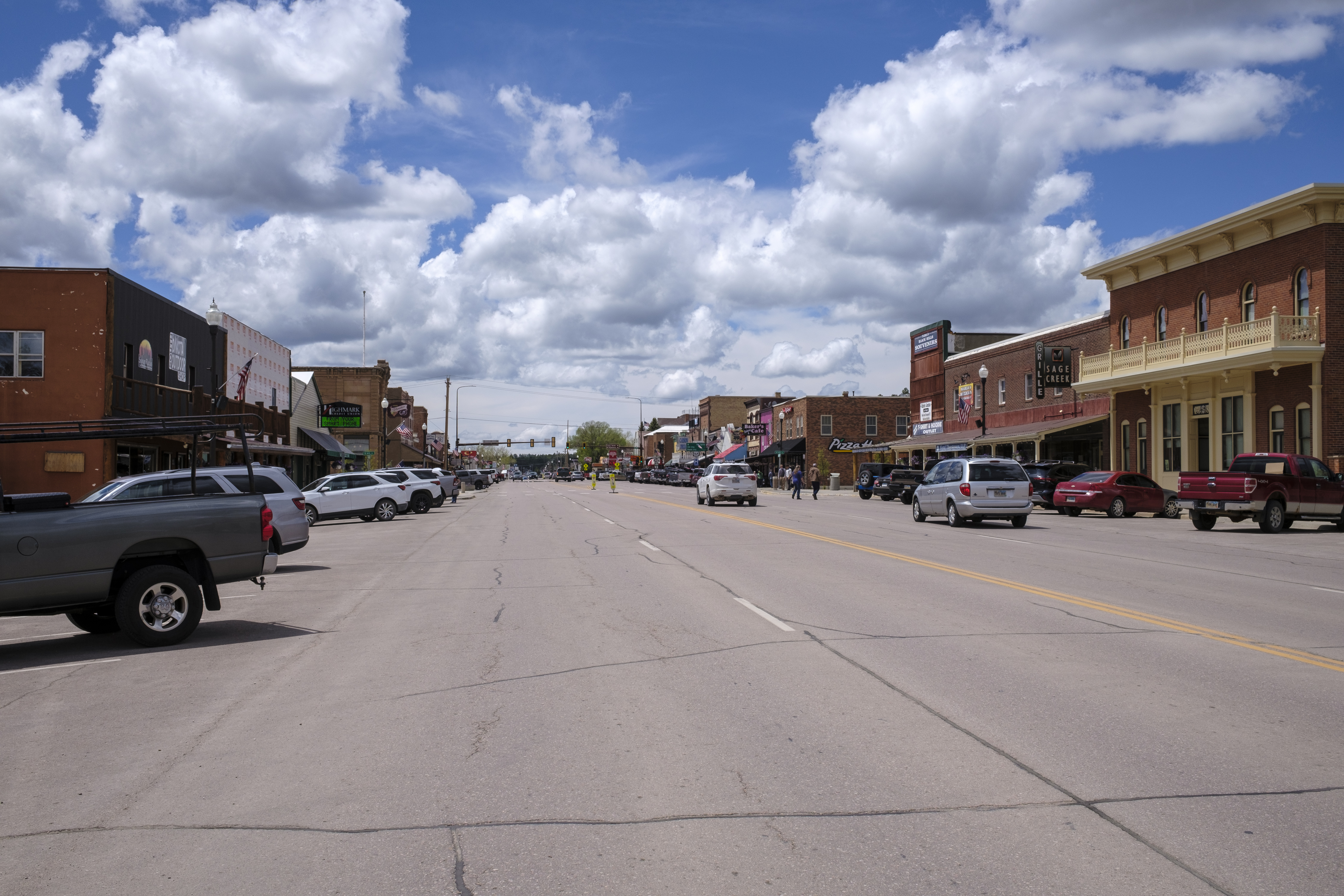

- Logo

- Location in Custer County and the state of South Dakota
- Coordinates: 43°46′00″N 103°35′56″W
- Country: United States
- State: South Dakota
- County: Custer
- Founded: 1875

Area
  - Total: 2.54 sq mi (6.58 km^{2})
  - Land: 2.53 sq mi (6.55 km^{2})
  - Water: 0.012 sq mi (0.03 km^{2})
- Elevation: 5,315 ft (1,620 m)

Population (2020)
  - Total: 1,919
  - Density: 758.4/sq mi (292.81/km^{2})
- Time zone: UTC−7 (MST)
  - Summer (DST): UTC−6 (MDT)
- ZIP Code: 57730
- Area code: 605
- FIPS code: 46-15140
- GNIS feature ID: 1265633
- Website: www.cityofcuster.com

Custer is a city in Custer County, South Dakota, United States. The population was 1,919 at the 2020 census. It is the county seat of Custer County.

== History ==
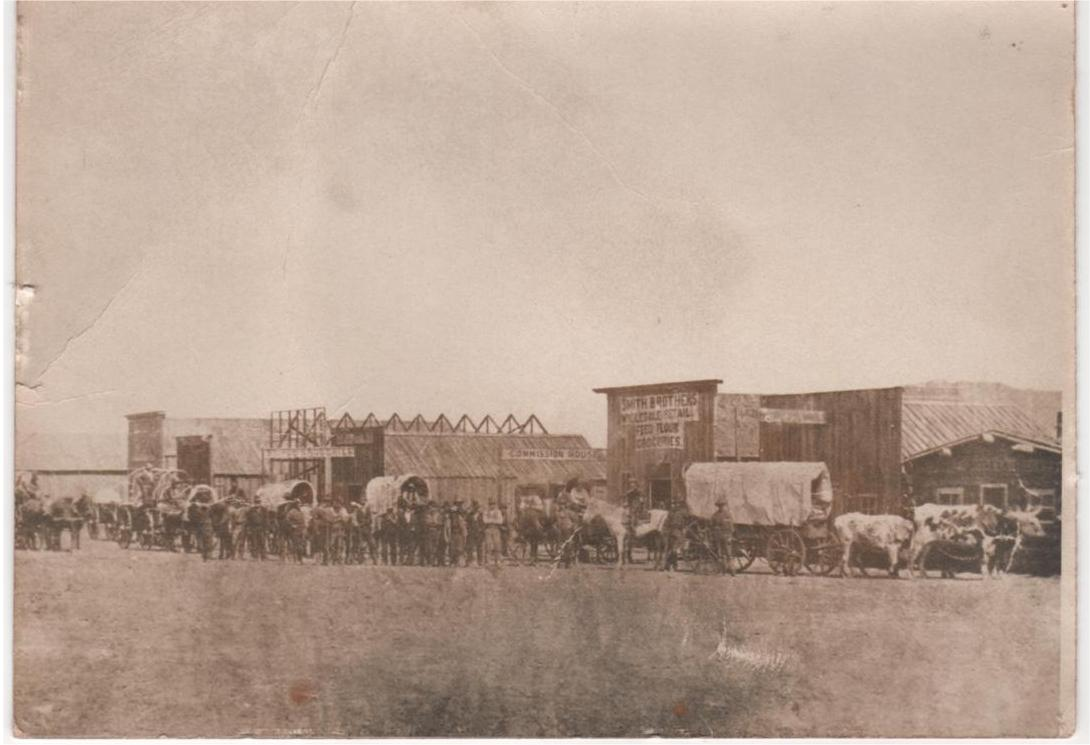
Oxen-drawn freight team entering Custer in 1876

Custer is the oldest town established by European Americans in the Black Hills. Gold was discovered east of Custer during the Black Hills Expedition, conducted by the 7th Cavalry led by Lt. Colonel George Armstrong Custer, a discovery which initiated the Black Hills Gold Rush.

For thousands of years, the Black Hills had been part of the territory of varying tribes of indigenous peoples. They were within historical territory of the Oglala Sioux at the time of United States encounter, and within the Great Sioux Reservation established by the US Treaty of Fort Laramie (1868). Having established dominance in the area by the eighteenth century, the Oglala Sioux had long considered the Black Hills as sacred land.

After increasing encroachment by Americans and violent confrontations, the U.S. government forced the Sioux to cede much of the Black Hills in 1877, and opened the land for individual purchase and settlement. In 1875 trespassing gold-boomers named their settlement Stonewall (after the Confederate general, Stonewall Jackson), but it was renamed for Custer. Almost abandoned in 1876 after word of the much larger gold strikes in Deadwood Gulch spread, Custer later became an established city.

Custer has had a smaller population and been less wealthy than the Northern Hills cities of Deadwood and Lead. In addition to gold, Custer and other cities based their economies on the extraction of industrial minerals, which are still important to the regional economy.

Custer annually observes a "Gold Discovery Days" celebration and festivities over the last full weekend of July. This heritage tourism event celebrates the embezzlement of gold by the Custer expedition in nearby French Creek and the subsequent founding of the town.

== Geography ==
According to the United States Census Bureau, the city has a total area of 2.54 square miles (6.58 km^{2}), of which 2.53 square miles (6.55 km^{2}) is land and 0.01 square miles (0.03 km^{2}) is water.

=== Climate ===
Custer has a humid continental climate (Köppen Dfb/Dwb) with summers featuring very warm afternoons and cool mornings, and cold, extremely variable winters.

Winter weather is dominated by the conflict between cold Arctic air moving south from Canada, and very warm chinook winds which can produce exceptionally high winter temperatures for the latitude and altitude. For instance, January 19 of 1963 saw the coldest temperature ever of −43 °F (−41.7 °C), yet in just over two weeks on February 5, Custer reached 65 °F (18.3 °C).

The coldest month has been January 1957, which averaged 9.7 °F (−12.4 °C) and included twenty-two mornings reaching 0 °F (−17.8 °C) – in contrast only one morning fell below zero Fahrenheit in the winter of 2015–16. On average the first temperature of 0 °F (−17.8 °C) will occur around November 25, and the last around March 8, whilst the corresponding window for freezing temperatures is from September 6 to June 2, allowing a frost-free season of only ninety-five days. Snowfall averages 57.9 inches (147 cm), and has ranged from 93.3 inches (237 cm) between July 1998 and June 1999, down to 15.9 inches (40 cm) during the very mild and dry winter of 1933–34. The frequent chinooks limit snow cover: even in January the mean is only 2.0 inches (5.1 cm). The most snow on the ground in Custer has been 27 inches (69 cm) on April 15, 1927.

Custer's altitude makes summers much milder than in the Great Plains proper: only seven afternoons rise above 90 °F (32.2 °C) and 100 °F (37.8 °C) has been reached only once in 1954. The transitional spring season is similarly variable to the winter: as much as 50.0 inches (127 cm) of snow fell in April 1920 – the snowiest month on record – but 70 °F (21.1 °C) has been reached as early as March 15 of 2003 and 80 °F (26.7 °C) as early as April 21, 1989. Most precipitation falls from spring and early summer thunderstorms: of the 20.66 inches (524.8 mm) of precipitation expected each year, 11.20 inches (284.5 mm) can be expected from April to July. May 1978 with 8.81 inches (223.8 mm) has been the wettest month, while the wettest calendar year has been 1998 with 27.11 inches (688.6 mm) and the driest 1916 with 9.27 inches (235.5 mm).

Climate data for Custer, South Dakota (elevation 5,480 feet (1,670 m)), 1991–2020 normals, extremes 1942–present
Month	Jan	Feb	Mar	Apr	May	Jun	Jul	Aug	Sep	Oct	Nov	Dec	Year
Record high °F (°C)	68 (20)	68 (20)	72 (22)	84 (29)	90 (32)	97 (36)	100 (38)	96 (36)	97 (36)	85 (29)	76 (24)	68 (20)	100 (38)
Mean maximum °F (°C)	54.9 (12.7)	53.6 (12.0)	63.2 (17.3)	71.6 (22.0)	78.9 (26.1)	86.8 (30.4)	90.9 (32.7)	89.2 (31.8)	85.8 (29.9)	74.7 (23.7)	62.3 (16.8)	53.5 (11.9)	92.2 (33.4)
Mean daily maximum °F (°C)	37.1 (2.8)	37.2 (2.9)	45.6 (7.6)	51.3 (10.7)	61.2 (16.2)	72.3 (22.4)	79.7 (26.5)	78.7 (25.9)	70.9 (21.6)	55.7 (13.2)	44.9 (7.2)	36.5 (2.5)	55.9 (13.3)
Daily mean °F (°C)	26.6 (−3.0)	26.6 (−3.0)	34.8 (1.6)	40.9 (4.9)	50.8 (10.4)	61.0 (16.1)	68.0 (20.0)	66.7 (19.3)	58.5 (14.7)	44.7 (7.1)	34.3 (1.3)	26.5 (−3.1)	44.9 (7.2)
Mean daily minimum °F (°C)	16.2 (−8.8)	16.1 (−8.8)	24.0 (−4.4)	30.5 (−0.8)	40.5 (4.7)	49.6 (9.8)	56.3 (13.5)	54.6 (12.6)	46.0 (7.8)	33.7 (0.9)	23.7 (−4.6)	16.6 (−8.6)	34.0 (1.1)
Mean minimum °F (°C)	−9.1 (−22.8)	−7.9 (−22.2)	1.2 (−17.1)	12.2 (−11.0)	24.4 (−4.2)	35.9 (2.2)	43.8 (6.6)	40.3 (4.6)	28.6 (−1.9)	12.6 (−10.8)	1.4 (−17.0)	−6.4 (−21.3)	−17.8 (−27.7)
Record low °F (°C)	−43 (−42)	−34 (−37)	−30 (−34)	−8 (−22)	5 (−15)	19 (−7)	30 (−1)	22 (−6)	8 (−13)	−10 (−23)	−25 (−32)	−37 (−38)	−43 (−42)
Average precipitation inches (mm)	0.36 (9.1)	0.70 (18)	0.92 (23)	2.24 (57)	3.53 (90)	3.43 (87)	3.16 (80)	2.43 (62)	1.53 (39)	1.45 (37)	0.55 (14)	0.36 (9.1)	20.66 (525)
Average snowfall inches (cm)	6.6 (17)	10.7 (27)	10.7 (27)	11.0 (28)	2.1 (5.3)	0.0 (0.0)	0.0 (0.0)	0.0 (0.0)	0.8 (2.0)	3.9 (9.9)	6.7 (17)	5.4 (14)	57.9 (147)
Average precipitation days (≥ 0.01 in)	4.2	5.9	6.2	9.7	14.4	12.7	10.6	8.9	6.8	6.2	4.1	3.8	93.5
Average snowy days (≥ 0.1 in)	4.4	6.2	5.2	4.3	0.8	0.0	0.0	0.0	0.3	2.1	4.0	3.9	31.2
Source: NOAA

== Demographics ==
Historical population
Census	Pop.	Note	%±
1880	271		—
1890	790		191.5%
1900	599		−24.2%
1910	602		0.5%
1920	595		−1.2%
1930	1,203		102.2%
1940	1,845		53.4%
1950	2,017		9.3%
1960	2,105		4.4%
1970	1,597		−24.1%
1980	1,830		14.6%
1990	1,741		−4.9%
2000	1,860		6.8%
2010	2,067		11.1%
2020	1,919		−7.2%
U.S. Decennial Census

=== 2020 census ===
As of the 2020 census, Custer had a population of 1,919. The median age was 53.9 years, 19.0% of residents were under the age of 18, and 32.4% were 65 years of age or older. For every 100 females there were 86.5 males, and for every 100 females age 18 and over there were 84.0 males age 18 and over.

0.0% of residents lived in urban areas, while 100.0% lived in rural areas.

There were 922 households in Custer, of which 19.8% had children under the age of 18 living in them. Of all households, 43.5% were married-couple households, 18.2% were households with a male householder and no spouse or partner present, and 32.1% were households with a female householder and no spouse or partner present. About 39.8% of all households were made up of individuals and 19.9% had someone living alone who was 65 years of age or older.

There were 1,101 housing units, of which 16.3% were vacant. The homeowner vacancy rate was 2.0% and the rental vacancy rate was 6.7%.

Racial composition as of the 2020 census
Race	Number	Percent
White	1,760	91.7%
Black or African American	17	0.9%
American Indian and Alaska Native	29	1.5%
Asian	11	0.6%
Native Hawaiian and Other Pacific Islander	0	0.0%
Some other race	23	1.2%
Two or more races	79	4.1%
Hispanic or Latino (of any race)	65	3.4%

=== 2010 census ===
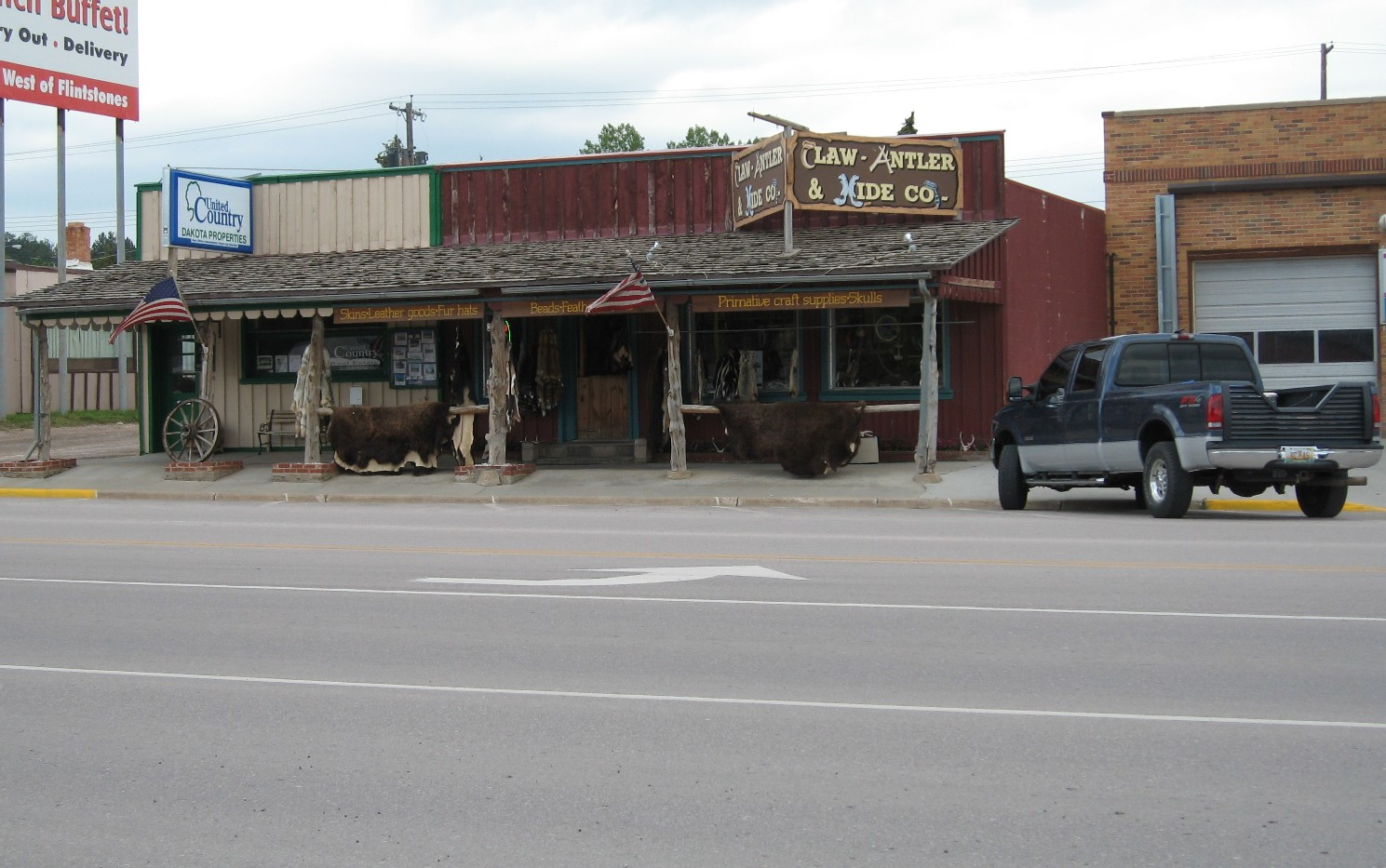
Shop in Custer main street 2006

As of the census of 2010, there were 1987 people, 956 households, and 535 families living in the city. The population density was 817.0 inhabitants per square mile (315.4/km^{2}). There were 1,129 housing units at an average density of 446.2 per square mile (172.3/km^{2}). The racial makeup of the city was 94.8% White, 0.5% African American, 2.6% Native American, 0.2% Asian, 0.5% from other races, and 1.4% from two or more races. Hispanic or Latino of any race were 2.6% of the population.

There were 956 households, of which 24.3% had children under the age of 18 living with them, 44.5% were married couples living together, 8.2% had a female householder with no husband present, 3.3% had a male householder with no wife present, and 44.0% were non-families. 40.2% of all households were made up of individuals, and 16.6% had someone living alone who was 65 years of age or older. The average household size was 2.06 and the average family size was 2.74.

The median age in the city was 47.5 years. 21.2% of residents were under the age of 18; 5.1% were between the ages of 18 and 24; 21.2% were from 25 to 44; 29.7% were from 45 to 64; and 22.9% were 65 years of age or older. The gender makeup of the city was 47.8% male and 52.2% female.

=== 2000 census ===
As of the census of 2000, there were 1,860 people, 825 households, and 491 families living in the city. The population density was 1,033.6 inhabitants per square mile (399.1/km^{2}). There were 934 housing units at an average density of 519.0 per square mile (200.4/km^{2}). The racial makeup of the city was 95.97% White, 0.38% African American, 1.61% Native American, 0.16% Asian, 0.38% from other races, and 1.51% from two or more races. Hispanic or Latino of any race were 1.51% of the population.

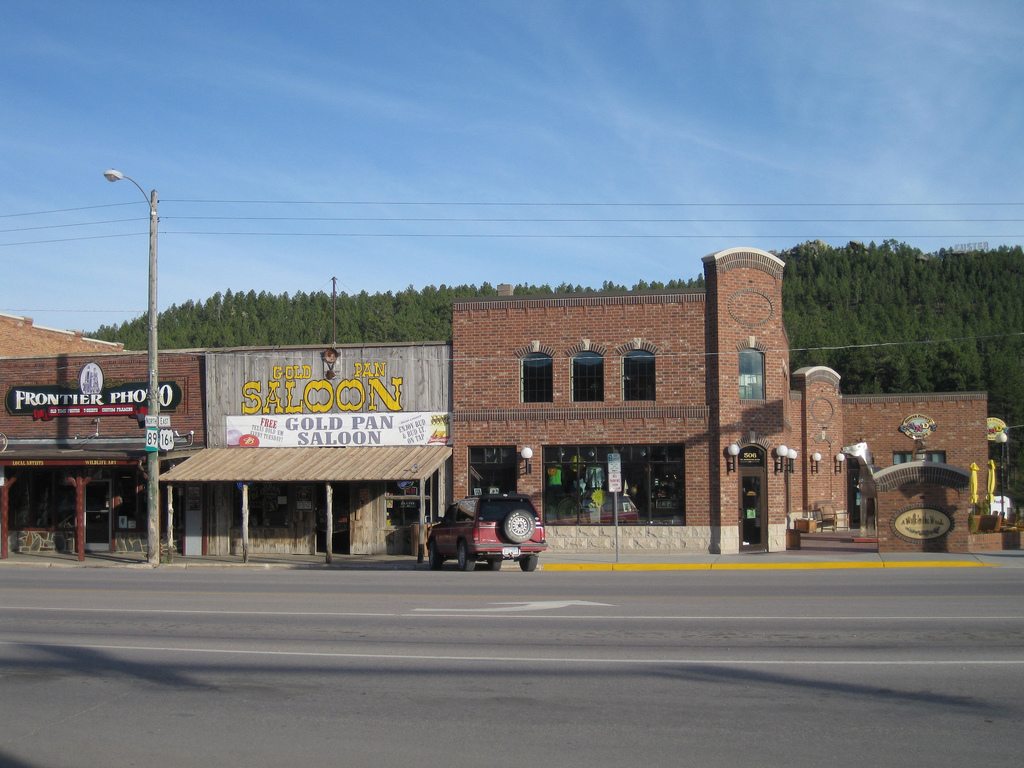
Downtown Custer, South Dakota

There were 825 households, out of which 27.8% had children under the age of 18 living with them, 48.6% were married couples living together, 9.0% had a female householder with no husband present, and 40.4% were non-families. 36.5% of all households were made up of individuals, and 16.6% had someone living alone who was 65 years of age or older. The average household size was 2.17 and the average family size was 2.85.

In the city, the population was spread out, with 23.3% under the age of 18, 6.8% from 18 to 24, 24.6% from 25 to 44, 25.7% from 45 to 64, and 19.6% who were 65 years of age or older. The median age was 42 years. For every 100 females, there were 92.5 males. For every 100 females age 18 and over, there were 86.6 males.

As of 2000 the median income for a household in the city was $31,739, and the median income for a family was $41,313. Males had a median income of $28,942 versus $19,688 for females. The per capita income for the city was $17,216. About 6.7% of families and 11.3% of the population were below the poverty line, including 13.9% of those under age 18 and 13.2% of those age 65 or over.

Although the incorporated city has a small population, many residents associated with it and the workforce live outside the city limits in unincorporated Custer County. A steady stream of tourists year round and those attracted to the annual Sturgis Motorcycle Rally add much to the economy and seasonal population of the city.

== Economy ==
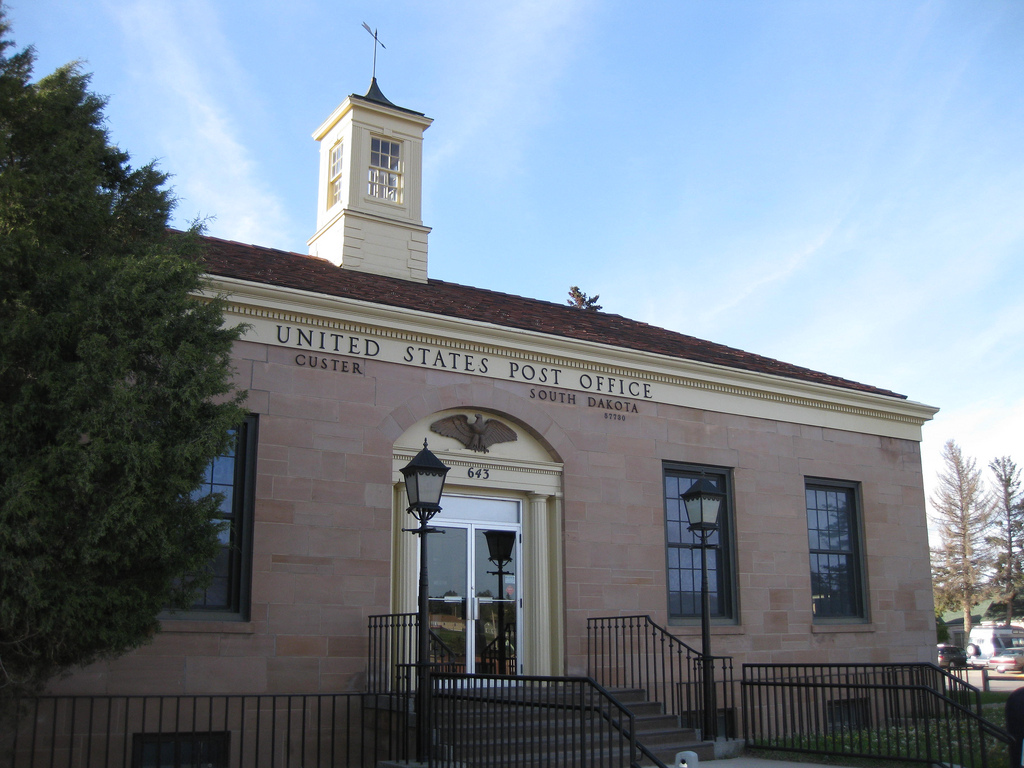
Custer Post Office

With the closing of the nearby sawmill and local mining company, tourism and hospitality services form the mainstay of the economy. Custer is the headquarters for the Supervisor of the Black Hills National Forest of South Dakota and Wyoming. It is convenient to major tourist attractions, such as Jewel Cave National Monument, Wind Cave National Park, Custer State Park, and Mount Rushmore National Memorial. The Crazy Horse Memorial is located just north of the city.

Custer is home to a regional hospital, Monument Health Custer Hospital, which has a clinic, a physical therapy department, an emergency department, and provides laboratory and infusion services.

== Education ==
- Custer High School

== Notable people ==
- Curtis Allgier, convicted murderer
- Tyler Schultz, American shot putter and silver medalist at the 2011 World Youth Championships in Athletics

=== Notable animals ===
- Custer Wolf

== Bibliography ==
- Charles Badger Clark: The Story of Custer City, S.D. (1941)
