= George S. Mickelson Trail =

Long-distance hiking trail in the United States

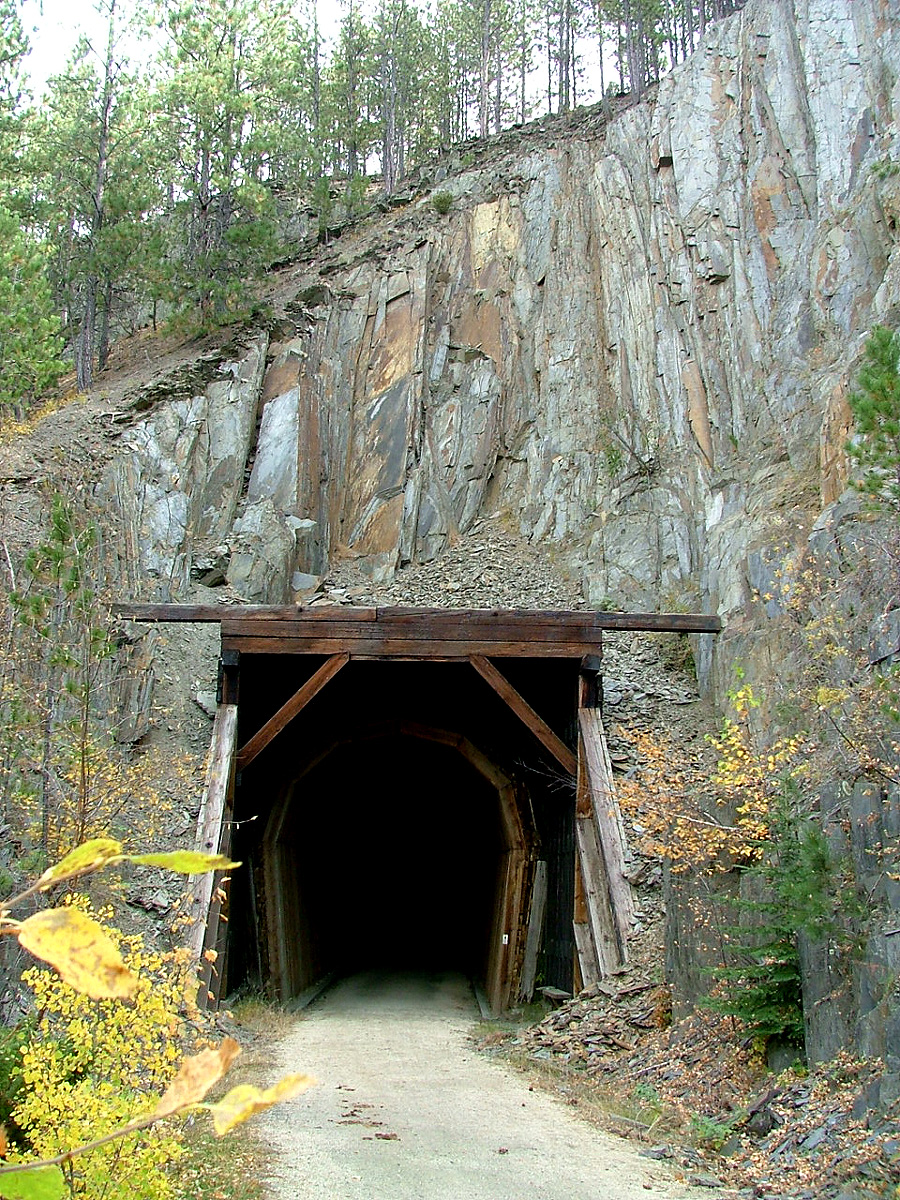
One of four tunnels along the trail.

The George S. Mickelson Trail is a rail trail in the Black Hills region of South Dakota. It is one of two long-distance trails in Western South Dakota, the other being the nearby Centennial Trail, which is generally considered more challenging than the Mickelson Trail.

The main trail route extends 108.8 miles (175.1 km), from Edgemont to Deadwood, with approximately nine miles of additional branch trails, including a three-mile (5 km) paved link from Custer to the Custer State Park completed in 2007. Intermediate points along the route include the towns of Custer and Hill City, and a short branch provides access to the city of Lead.

Nearly all of the trail follows the route of an abandoned railroad branch line constructed by the Chicago, Burlington and Quincy Railroad in 1890-91 and last operated by the Burlington Northern Railroad in 1986. The trail's route is mountainous, forested, and scenic, traversing the heart of the Black Hills and largely within the boundaries of the Black Hills National Forest, although there are parts of the trail that pass through privately owned land, where trail use is restricted to the trail only. The trail alignment includes four tunnels and more than 100 converted railroad bridges. There are fifteen established trailheads spaced along the route, all of which include vehicle parking, self-sale trail pass stations, vault toilets, and tables. The trail surface is packed crushed limestone and gravel.

The trail is maintained by the South Dakota Department of Game, Fish, and Parks. The first segment of the trail was opened in 1991, and the entire route was completed in 1998, and is the first rails to trails project in South Dakota. The trail is named after George S. Mickelson, the South Dakota governor who helped spearhead the project.

Trailheads
Location	Milepost #	Coordinates
Edgemont	0	43°18′41″N 103°49′05″W
Deadwood	108.8	44°22′14″N 103°43′42″W

== See also ==
- Centennial Trail (South Dakota)
- List of rail trails
- List of South Dakota state parks
