= Centennial Trail (South Dakota) =

Trail in South Dakota

- Length: 123 mi (198 km)
- Established: 1989
- Trailheads: Wind Cave National Park, Bear Butte State Park
- Use: Hiking, mountain biking, horseback riding
- Maintainer: U. S. Forest Service and Black Hills Trails
- Website: gfp.sd.gov/userdocs/centennial-trail-brochure.pdf

Trail map
- Map

The South Dakota Centennial Trail, also called the Black Hills Centennial Trail, is a long-distance trail in the Black Hills region of South Dakota. It runs 123 miles (198 km) (Note: The official state brochure claims the trail is 111 miles (179 km) but calculating the distance using the most detailed map adds up to 123 miles.) south to north from Wind Cave National Park to Bear Butte State Park. The trail is blazed by a white diamond with a black "89" on the top half and a bison skull on the bottom half. It is one of two long-distance hiking trails in Western South Dakota, the other being the nearby George S. Mickelson Trail, which is generally considered easier than the Centennial Trail. The trail has 21 official trailheads. In addition to hiking, the trail is open to mountain biking and horseback riding in most areas. (Note: Wind Cave National Park and some areas of Bear Butte State Park prohibit mountain biking and horseback riding; the Black Elk Wilderness only prohibits mountain biking.) The Centennial Trail was certified as a National Recreation Trail in 2005.

== History ==
The trail opened in 1989 to celebrate South Dakota's 100th year of statehood. It was developed through combined efforts of the South Dakota Department of Game, Fish, and Parks, the United States Forest Service, the National Park Service, and the Bureau of Land Management.

== Route ==
The trail features diverse terrain, from rolling hills and prairie in the lower elevation areas to ponderosa pine forest and more rugged terrain in the Black Hills.

The trail begins at the Norbeck Trailhead in Wind Cave National Park and runs through the mixed-grass prairie of the park for 6.2 miles (10.0 km) before entering Custer State Park, where it remains for about 22 miles (35 km). The trail starts to gain more elevation after crossing French Creek on the way to Legion Lake in the state park and offers views of the Needles and Black Elk Peak before entering the Black Elk Wilderness of the Black Hills National Forest.

Within the wilderness the trail passes more large granite spires. A 1-mile side trail from the wilderness leads to Mount Rushmore. The trail continues through the wilderness for about 8 miles (13 km) and then enters the Norbeck Wildlife Preserve for a short time before returning to the Black Hills National Forest, where it remains for the next 70 miles (110 km). The trail reaches the summit of Mount Warner, the highest point on the trail at 5,889 feet (1,795 m) above sea level before dropping down to Sheridan Lake. It then runs primarily along the ridgeline until reaching Rapid Creek just below the Pactola Dam. The trail runs parallel to U.S. Route 385 until reaching the ghost town of Merritt. It then follows ATV trails from Merritt to Dalton Lake. This section passes close to Nemo, one of two towns along the Centennial Trail.

The trail then runs along the rim of the Elk Creek canyon, offering views of the trail's northern terminus at Bear Butte, and then descends out of the Black Hills and into grassland with rolling hills. After crossing under Interstate 90 the trail enters the Fort Meade Recreation Area near Sturgis, where it remains for just 8.5 miles (13.7 km), and passes historic buildings and Fort Meade National Cemetery before entering Bear Butte State Park. The final leg of the hike from the entrance of the state park is 4 miles (6.4 km) to the top of Bear Butte; the final ascent gains over 1,000 feet (300 m) of elevation in about 1.5 miles (2.4 km).

== Flora and fauna ==
Most of the Centennial Trail passes through ponderosa pine forest. Other common trees include Black Hills spruce and aspen. Common flowers include blackeyed susan, harebell, and wood lily.

Common animals seen along the trail include American bison, mountain goats, bighorn sheep, pronghorn antelope, white-tailed and mule deer, elk, bald eagles, rattlesnakes, and more. During summer months it is also common to see cattle grazing on parts of the trail managed by the Bureau of Land Management.

== See also ==
- George S. Mickelson Trail
- List of long-distance trails in the United States
