= Sylvan Lake (South Dakota) =

Man-made lake in South Dakota, United States

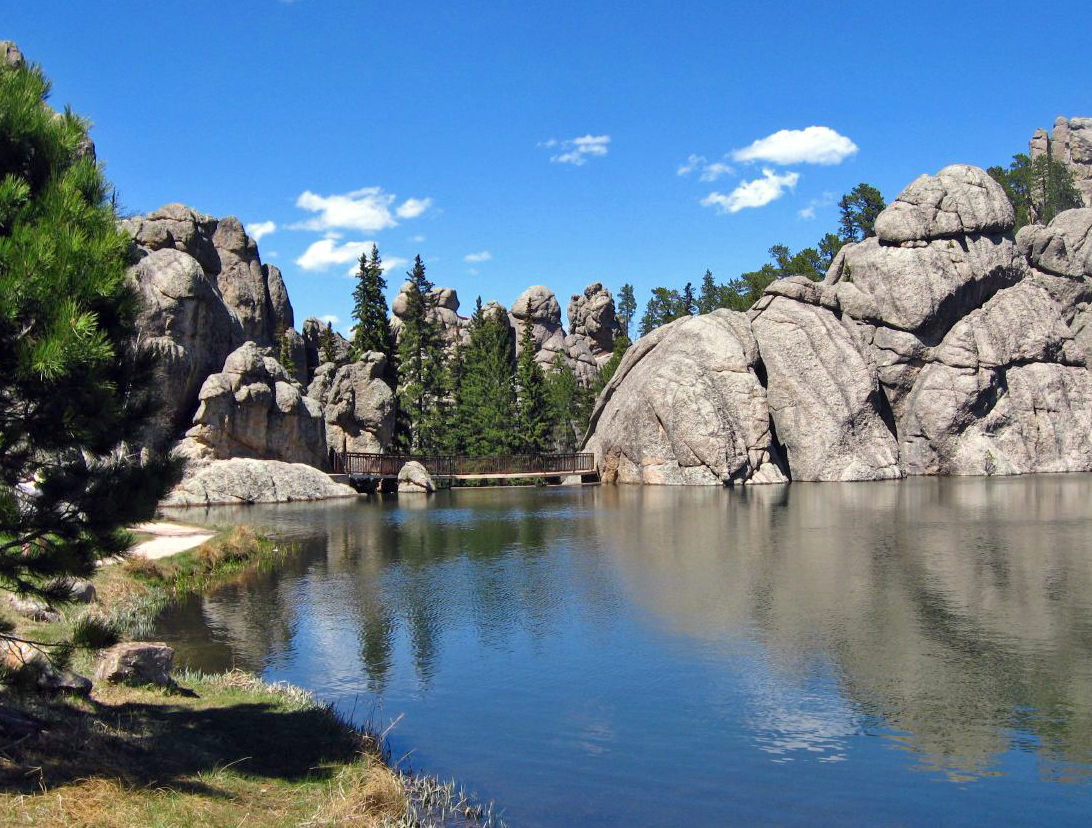
- Rock formations near lake

- Location within South Dakota Location within the United States
- Location: Custer County, South Dakota, United States
- Coordinates: 43°50′44.52″N 103°33′48.57″W
- Primary outflows: Sunday Gulch Creek
- Basin countries: United States
- Surface area: 17.3 acres (7.0 ha)
- Average depth: 12.8 feet (3.9 m)
- Max. depth: 30 feet (9.1 m)
- Shore length^{1}: 1 mile (1.6 km)
- Surface elevation: 6,145 feet (1,873 m)
- ^{1} Shore length is not a well-defined measure.

Sylvan Lake is a lake located in Custer State Park, in the Black Hills of South Dakota, United States. It was created in 1891 when Theodore Reder built a dam (the Sylvan Lake Water Dam) across Sunday Gulch Creek. The lake area offers picnic places, rock climbing, small rental boats, swimming, and hiking trails. It is also popular as a starting point for excursions to Black Elk Peak and The Needles. A hotel was operated on the shore of the lake in the early 20th century .

The lake was featured in Disney's 2007 film National Treasure: Book of Secrets. The film made the lake appear to be located directly behind Mount Rushmore when in reality it is actually five miles southwest of Mount Rushmore.

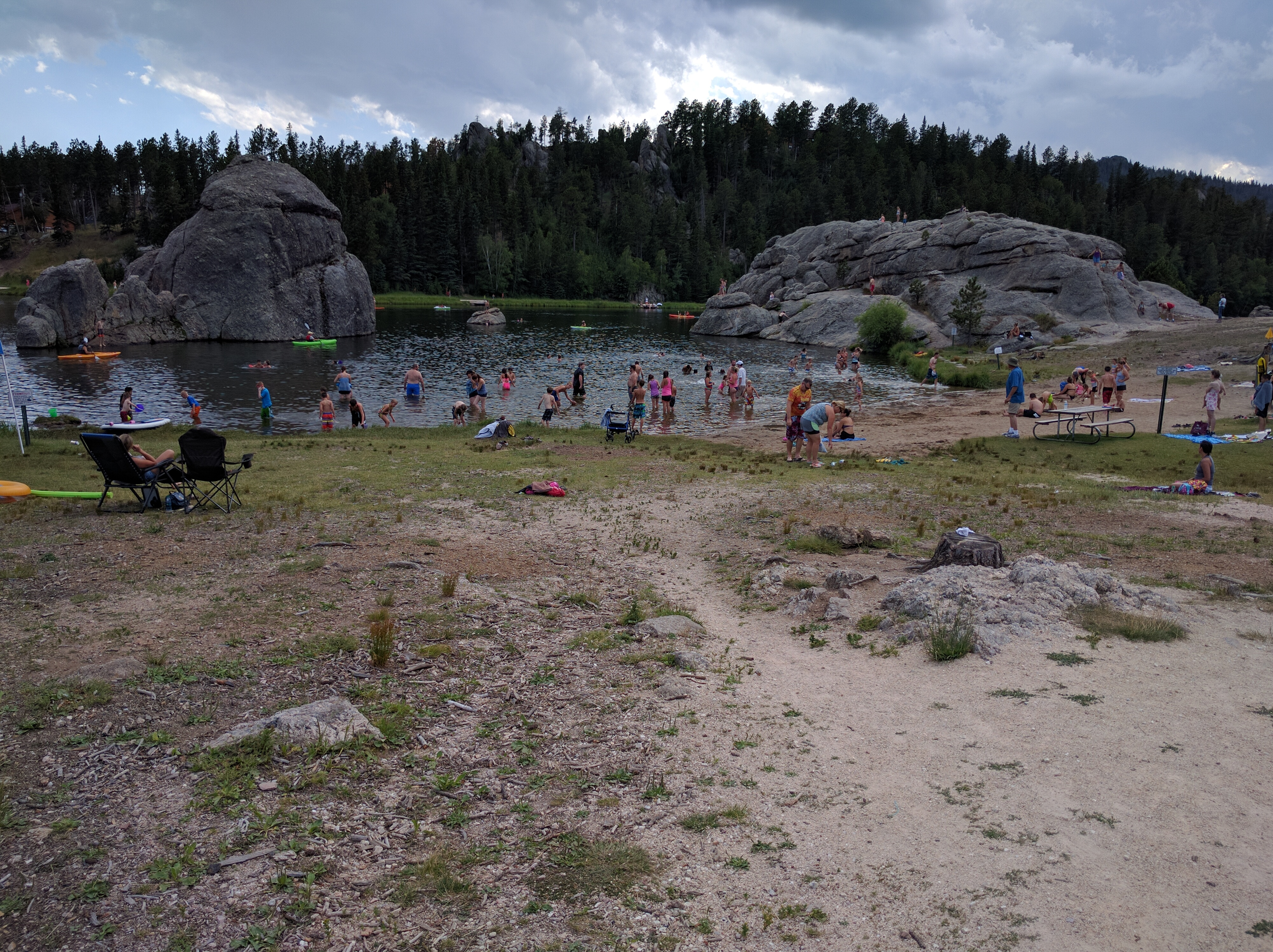
Swimming and other activities are popular at Sylvan Lake.

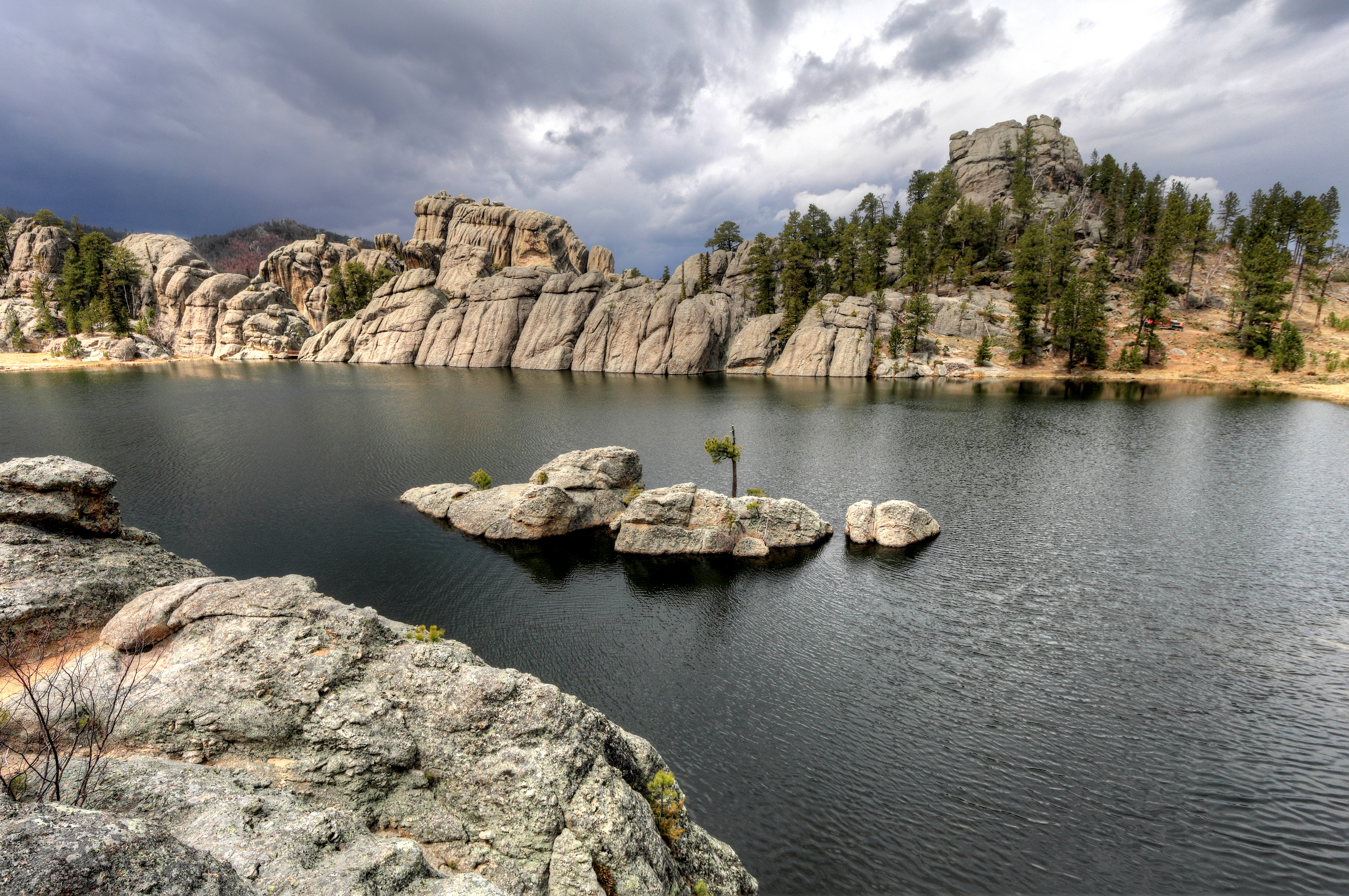
Rock wall damming the northwest side of Sylvan Lake

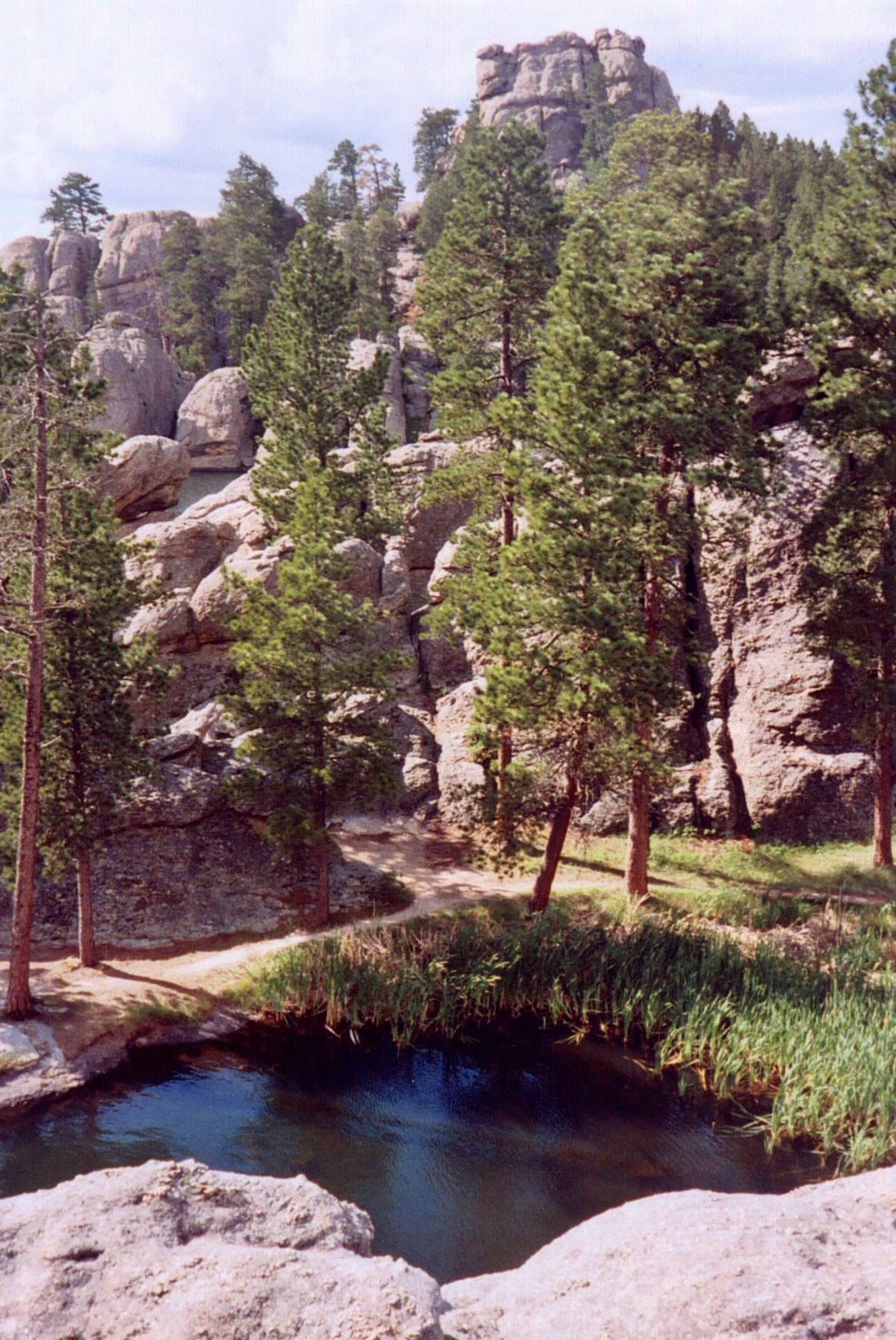
Path between rocks and lake

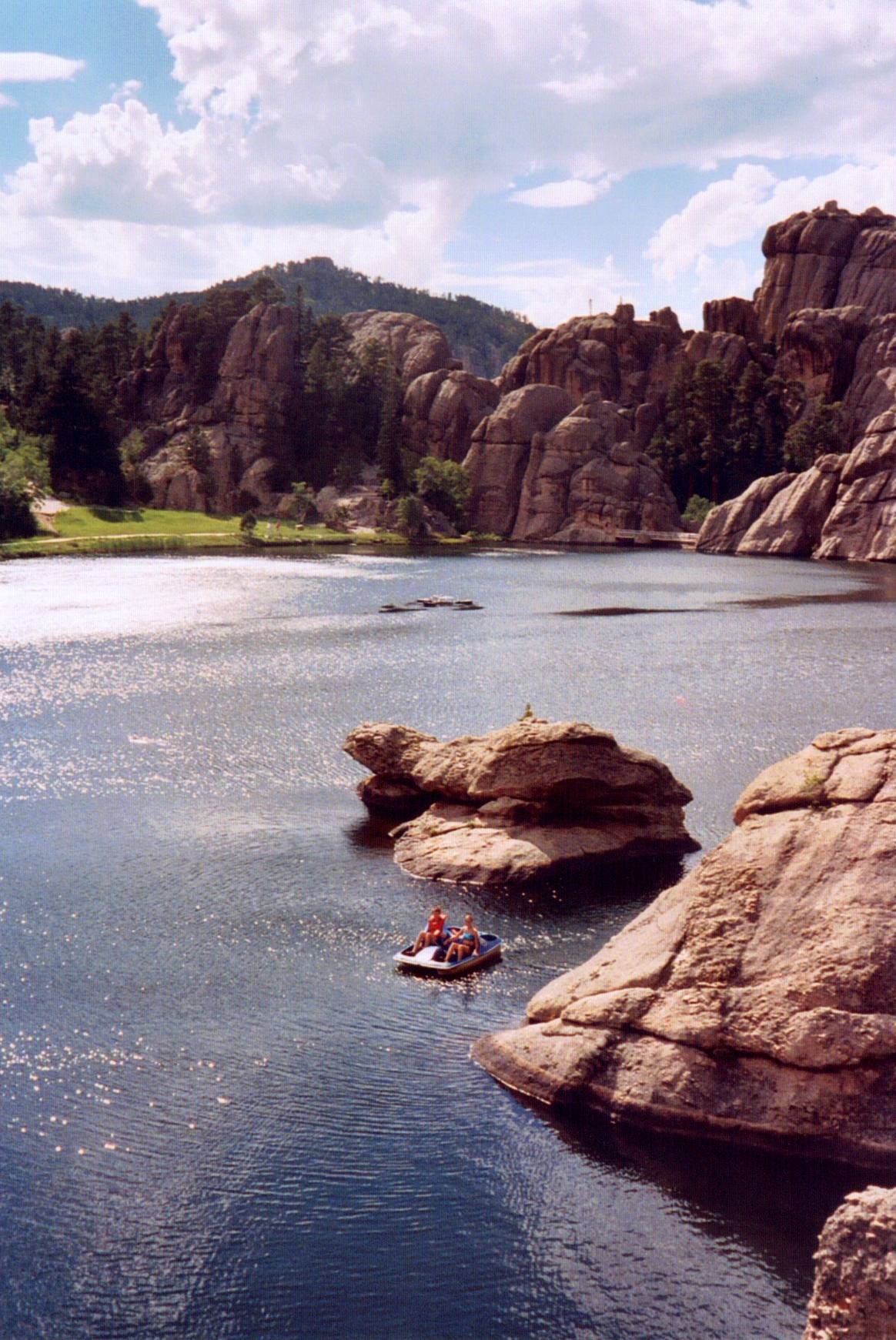
Paddleboat on the lake

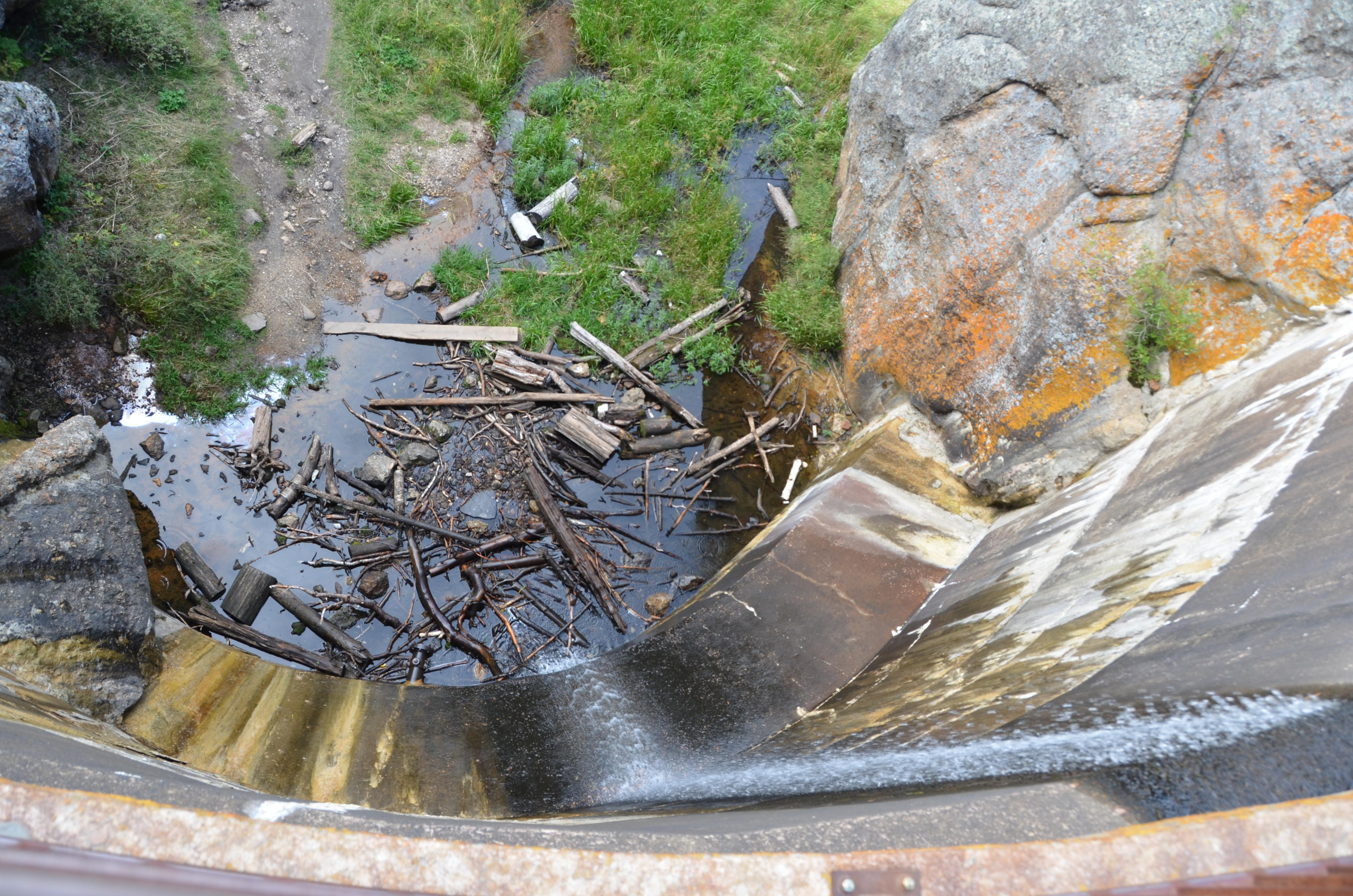
View down from Sylvan Lake Water Dam to the Sunday Gulch Creek

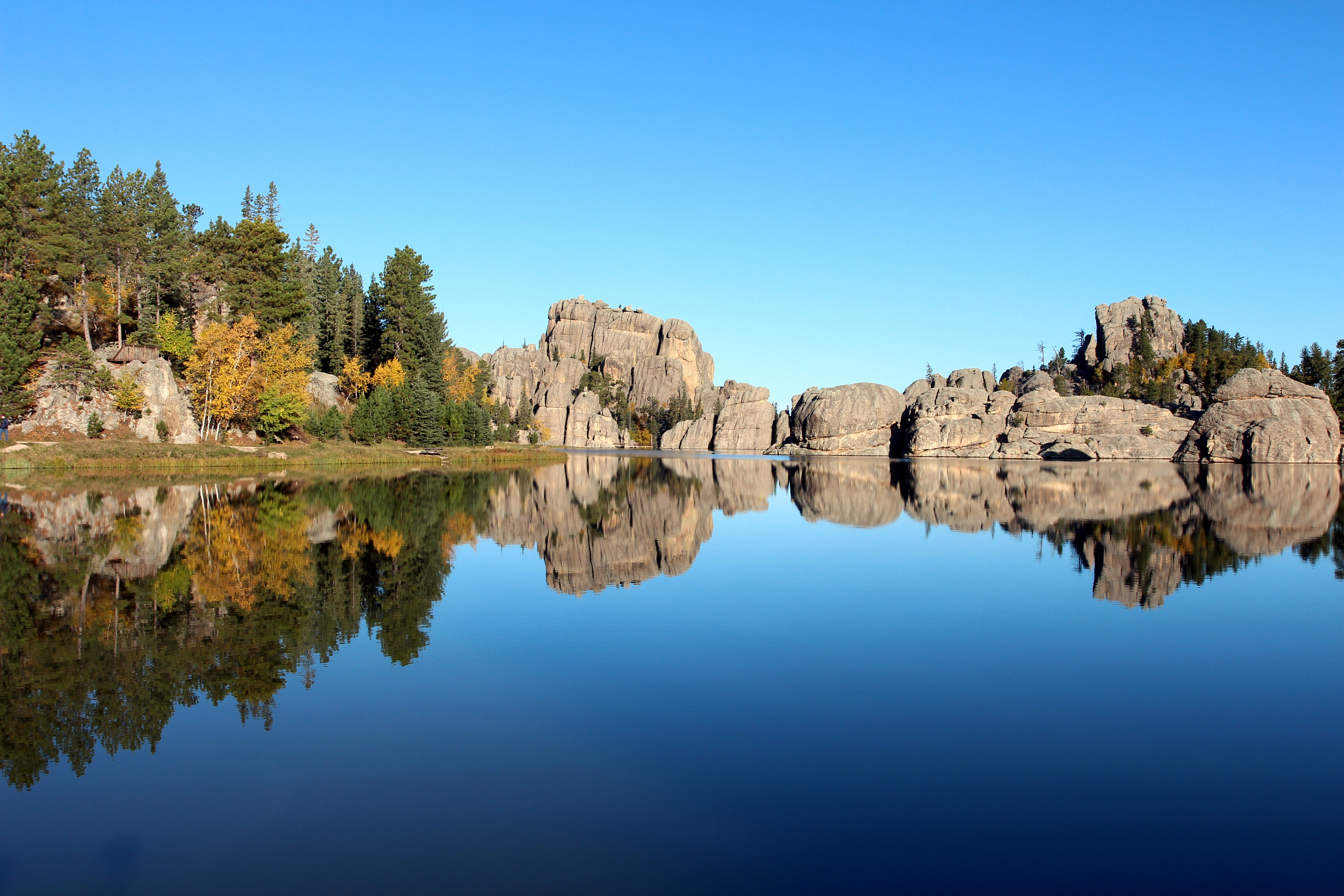
A view of Sylvan Lake in Custer State Park, South Dakota.

== See also ==
- List of South Dakota lakes
