= Black Hills =

Mountain range in South Dakota and Wyoming, United States

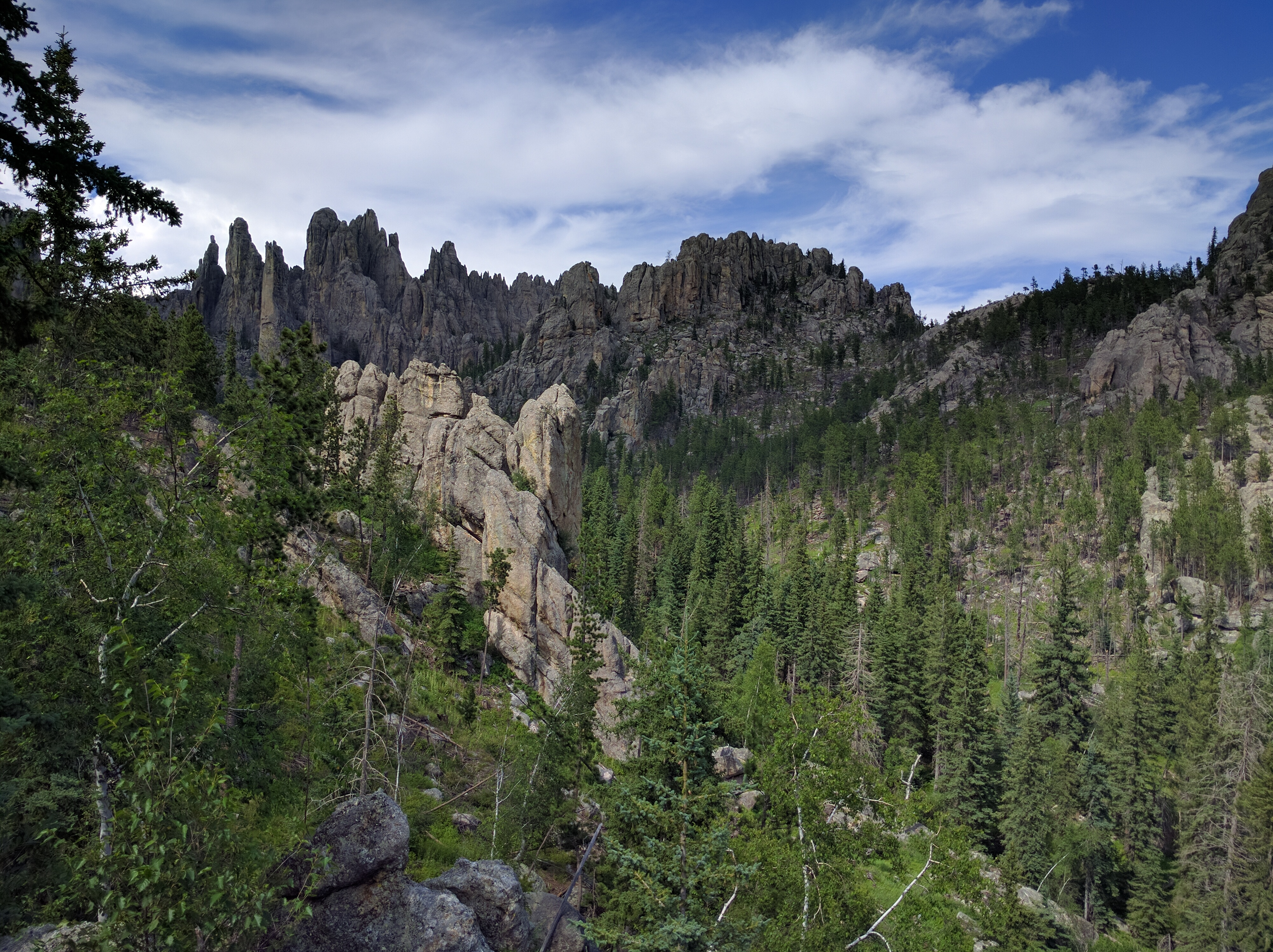
- The Needles, Black Hills

Highest point
- Peak: Black Elk Peak
- Elevation: 7,244 ft (2,208 m) NAVD 88
- Listing: Isolated summits of the United States
- Coordinates: 43°51′57″N 103°31′57″W

Dimensions
- Area: 5,000 mi^{2} (13,000 km^{2})

Naming
- Native name: Pahá Sápa (Lakota); Moʼȯhta-voʼhonáaeva (Cheyenne); awaxaawi shiibisha (Hidatsa)

Geography
- Location within the United States
- Country: United States
- State: South Dakota and Wyoming

Geology
- Orogenies: Trans-Hudson and Laramide
- Rock ages: Precambrian, Paleozoic, Mesozoic, Cenozoic and Tertiary
- Rock types: Shale, sandstone, limestone, slate, quartzite and granite

The Black Hills are an outlying subrange of the greater Rocky Mountain system rising from the Great Plains of North America in western South Dakota and eastern Wyoming, United States. Black Elk Peak, which rises to 7,242 feet (2,207 m), is the range's highest summit. The name of the range in Lakota is Pahá Sápa. It encompasses the Black Hills National Forest. It formed as a result of an upwarping of ancient rock, after which the removal of the higher portions of the mountain mass by stream erosion produced the present-day topography. The Black Hills are part of the North American Cordillera, specifically a range within the Rocky Mountain Front of Wyoming, South Dakota, and Montana. The mountains are so called because of their dark appearance from a distance, as they are covered in evergreen trees.

American Indian tribes have a long history in the Black Hills and consider it a sacred site. After conquering the Cheyenne in 1776, the Lakota took the territory of the Black Hills, which became central to their culture. In 1868, the federal US government signed the Fort Laramie Treaty of 1868, establishing the Great Sioux Reservation west of the Missouri River, and exempting the Black Hills from all non-indigenous settlement “forever”; however, when American settlers discovered gold here as a result of George Armstrong Custer's Black Hills Expedition in 1874, a gold rush swept in miners. The US government conquered the Black Hills and forcibly relocated the Lakota, following the Great Sioux War of 1876, to five smaller reservations in western South Dakota, selling off 9 million acres (36,000 km^{2}) of their former land. Unlike most of South Dakota, the Black Hills were settled primarily by European Americans from population centers to the west and south of the region, as miners flocked there from earlier gold boom locations in Colorado and Montana.

As the economy of the Black Hills has shifted away from natural resources (mining and timber) since the late 20th century, the hospitality and tourism industries have grown to take its place. Locals tend to divide the Black Hills into two areas: "The Southern Hills" and "The Northern Hills." The Southern Hills is home to Mount Rushmore National Memorial, Wind Cave National Park, Jewel Cave National Monument, Black Elk Peak (the highest point in South Dakota), Custer State Park (the largest state park in South Dakota), the Crazy Horse Memorial, and The Mammoth Site in Hot Springs, the world's largest mammoth research facility.

Attractions in the Northern Hills include Spearfish Canyon, historic Deadwood, and the Sturgis Motorcycle Rally, held each August. The first Rally was held on August 14, 1938, and the 75th Rally in 2015 saw more than one million bikers visit the Black Hills. Devils Tower National Monument, located in the Wyoming Black Hills, is an important nearby attraction and was the United States' first national monument.

== History ==
=== Archaeology ===
Although the written history of the region begins with the Sioux domination of the land over the native Arikara tribes, researchers have carbon-dating and stratigraphic records to analyze the early history of the area. Scientists have been able to utilize carbon-dating to evaluate the age of tools found in the area, which indicate a human presence that dates as far back as 11,500 BC with the Clovis culture.

=== Indigenous history ===
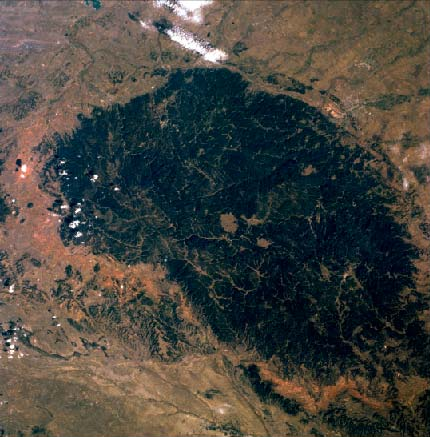
2006 Space Shuttle image of the Black Hills

The Black Hills have been inhabited by numerous indigenous groups over the centuries. The Ponca, Arikara, and Mandan were among the earliest recorded inhabitants, and were later displaced by the Kiowa, Plains Apache, and Shoshone. Those groups had largely left the area by around 1800 and returned only occasionally for trading or raids on other groups. The groups that initially supplanted them were primarily the Cheyenne and Arapaho, along with smaller numbers of Lakota Sioux. By 1850, the demographic situation had reversed, with bands of Cheyenne and Arapaho living among a Lakota majority. The Lakota call the Black Hills Pahá Sápa and consider the entire region to be sacred ground, referring to the hills as wamakaognaka e'cante, "the heart of everything that is". The Cheyenne, Arapaho, and other Native groups of the Northern Plains also recognize particular sites within the Black Hills as having sacred significance.

=== Exploration and treaties ===
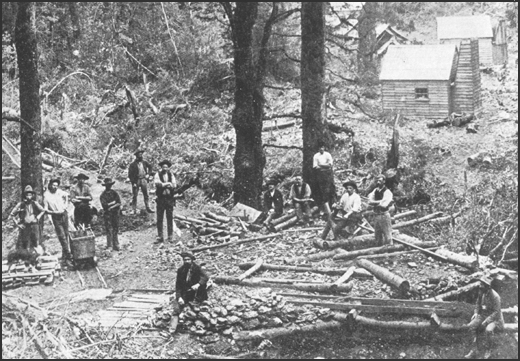
Gold miners in the Black Hills

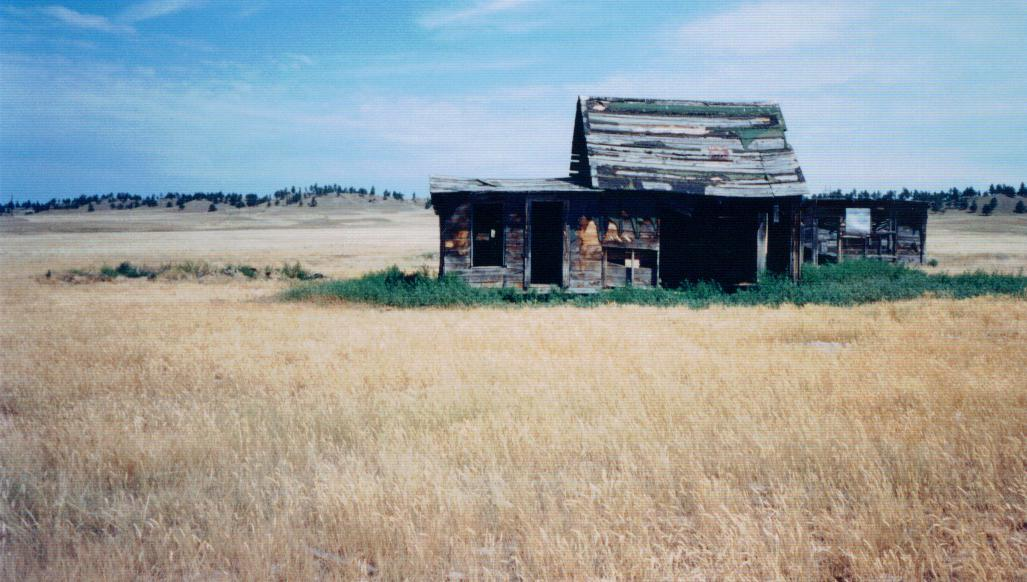
Abandoned cabin near Dewey in the southern Black Hills

François and Louis de La Vérendrye probably traveled near the Black Hills in 1743. Fur trappers and traders also had some dealings with the American Indians that lived there.

In the mid-nineteenth century, Americans settlers increasingly encroached on indigenous territory, prompting hostilities between the natives and newcomers. In order to secure safe passage of settlers on the Oregon Trail, and also to end intertribal warfare, the United States government and native tribes negotiated the 1851 First Treaty of Fort Laramie. In it, the Black Hills were recognized as the exclusive territory of the Lakota. The Cheyenne and Arapaho, who had claims of their own in the Black Hills, were not granted land rights in the area, and were consigned to territories elsewhere.

Violations of the 1851 treaty, notably the Grattan massacre, led to a series of conflicts known as the Sioux Wars. These wars were settled by the Second Treaty of Fort Laramie in 1868, creating the Great Sioux Reservation west of the Missouri River, in which the Black Hills were situated. The 1868 treaty also allowed the Northern Arapaho to settle on the Sioux reservation, but they declined to do so because they did not want to live as a small group among a larger and more powerful tribe. The treaty protected the Black Hills "forever" from American settlers, but remained in force for less than a decade before further developments would lead to violations of the treaty by settlers and the US government.

=== Black Hills gold rush and American seizure ===
Although rumors of gold in the Black Hills had circulated for decades (see Thoen Stone and Pierre-Jean De Smet), confirmation of the deposits came first in 1874, when Brevet Major General George Armstrong Custer of the 7th US Cavalry led an expedition there and discovered gold in French Creek. An official announcement of gold was made by the newspaper reporters accompanying the expedition. The following year, the Newton-Jenney Party conducted the first detailed survey of the Black Hills. The surveyor for the party, Valentine McGillycuddy, became the first European American to ascend to the top of Black Elk Peak. This highest point in the Black Hills is 7,242 feet (2,207 m) above sea level.

During the 1875–1878 gold rush thousands of miners went to the Black Hills; in 1880, the area was the most densely populated part of the Dakota Territory. Three large towns developed in the Northern Hills: Deadwood, Central City, and Lead. Around these clustered groups of smaller gold camps, towns, and villages. Hill City and Custer City sprang up in the Southern Hills. Railroads were quickly constructed to the previously remote area. From 1880 onward the gold mines yielded about $4,000,000 annually, and the silver mines about $3,000,000 annually.

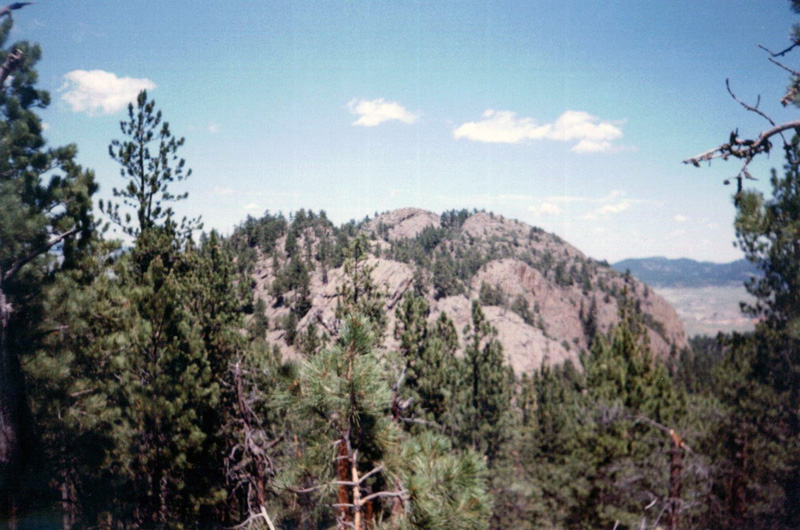
Inyan Kara is a sacred mountain to the Lakota people

The conflict over control of the region sparked the Black Hills War (1876), also known as the Great Sioux War, the last major Indian War on the Great Plains. Following the defeat of the Lakota and their Cheyenne and Arapaho allies in 1876, the United States occupied the Black Hills in disregard of past treaties. Despite their forced relocations, the Lakota never accepted the validity of the US appropriation. They have continued to try to reclaim the property, and had also filed a lawsuit against the U.S. federal government.

=== Modern history ===
On July 23, 1980, in United States v. Sioux Nation of Indians, the Supreme Court of the United States ruled that the Black Hills were illegally seized by the federal U.S. government and ordered remuneration of the initial offering price plus interest, nearly $106 million. The Lakota refused the settlement, as they wanted the Black Hills returned to them. The money remains in a Bureau of Indian Affairs account accruing compound interest, but the Lakota still refuse to take the money, as acceptance would also legally terminate their demands for return of the Black Hills. As of 2011, the Sioux's award plus interest was "about $1 billion" or "1.3 billion" (equivalent to $1.44 to $1.87 billion in 2025).

In 2012, United Nations Special Rapporteur James Anaya conducted a 12-day tour of Indigenous lands to determine how the US is following the United Nations Declaration on the Rights of Indigenous Peoples, endorsed in 2010 by the Obama administration. Anaya met with tribes in seven states on reservations and in urban areas as well as with members of the Obama administration and the Senate Committee on Indian Affairs. In an appeal issued August 21, 2012, Anaya brought a sale of over 1,900 acres (7.7 km^{2}) of land in Black Hills by the Reynolds family to the attention of the US government and asked that it disclose measures taken by federal or state governments to address Sioux concerns over the sale of the land within Reynolds Prairie. These acres consist of five land tracts, including the sacred Pe' Sla site for Dakota, Lakota, and Nakota peoples; natives to the Black Hills fundraised to buy the land during the Reynolds' sale.

On January 15, 2013, the US responded, telling Anaya that it "understands several tribes purchased the Pe' Sla sacred site around November 30, 2012" meaning the Pe' Sla is officially Sioux land. After 2,022 acres (8.18 km^{2}) of Pe' Sla (Reynolds Prairie) were granted Federal Indian trust status by the Bureau of Indian Affairs in March 2016, the Shakopee Mdewakanton tribe released a statement acknowledging the 2012 land purchase of 1,940 acres (7.9 km^{2}) of Pe' Sla and also stated that this purchase was the result of a joint effort by the Rosebud, Shakopee Mdewakanton, Crow Creek, and Standing Rock Sioux Tribes. In March 2017, Pennington County agreed to abandon its claim to the Pe' Sla area and recognize its Federal Indian trust status. In 2016, the Southern Cheyenne and Arapaho Tribe of Oklahoma, the Northern Cheyenne Tribe of Montana and the Rosebud Sioux Tribe of South Dakota bought land near the sacred Bear Butte site for $1.1 million. In 2018, the Northern Cheyenne Tribe of Montana and the Arapahoe Tribe of Oklahoma teamed together to purchase land near Bear Butte for $2.3 million.

== Geology ==
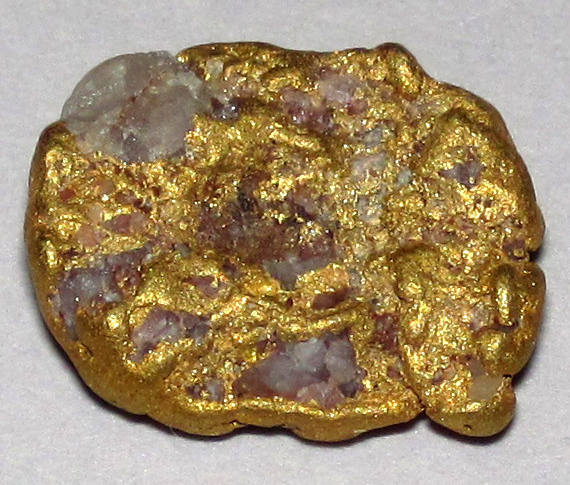
Gold-quartz placer nugget, found near Lead; about 1 cm wide

The geology of the Black Hills is complex. A Tertiary mountain-building episode is responsible for the uplift and current topography of the Black Hills region. This uplift was marked by volcanic activity in the northern Black Hills. The southern Black Hills are characterized by Precambrian granite, pegmatite, and metamorphic rocks that comprise the core of the entire Black Hills uplift. This core is rimmed by Paleozoic, Mesozoic, and Cenozoic sedimentary rocks. The stratigraphy of the Black Hills is laid out like a target, as it is an oval dome, with rings of different rock types dipping away from the center.

=== Precambrian ===
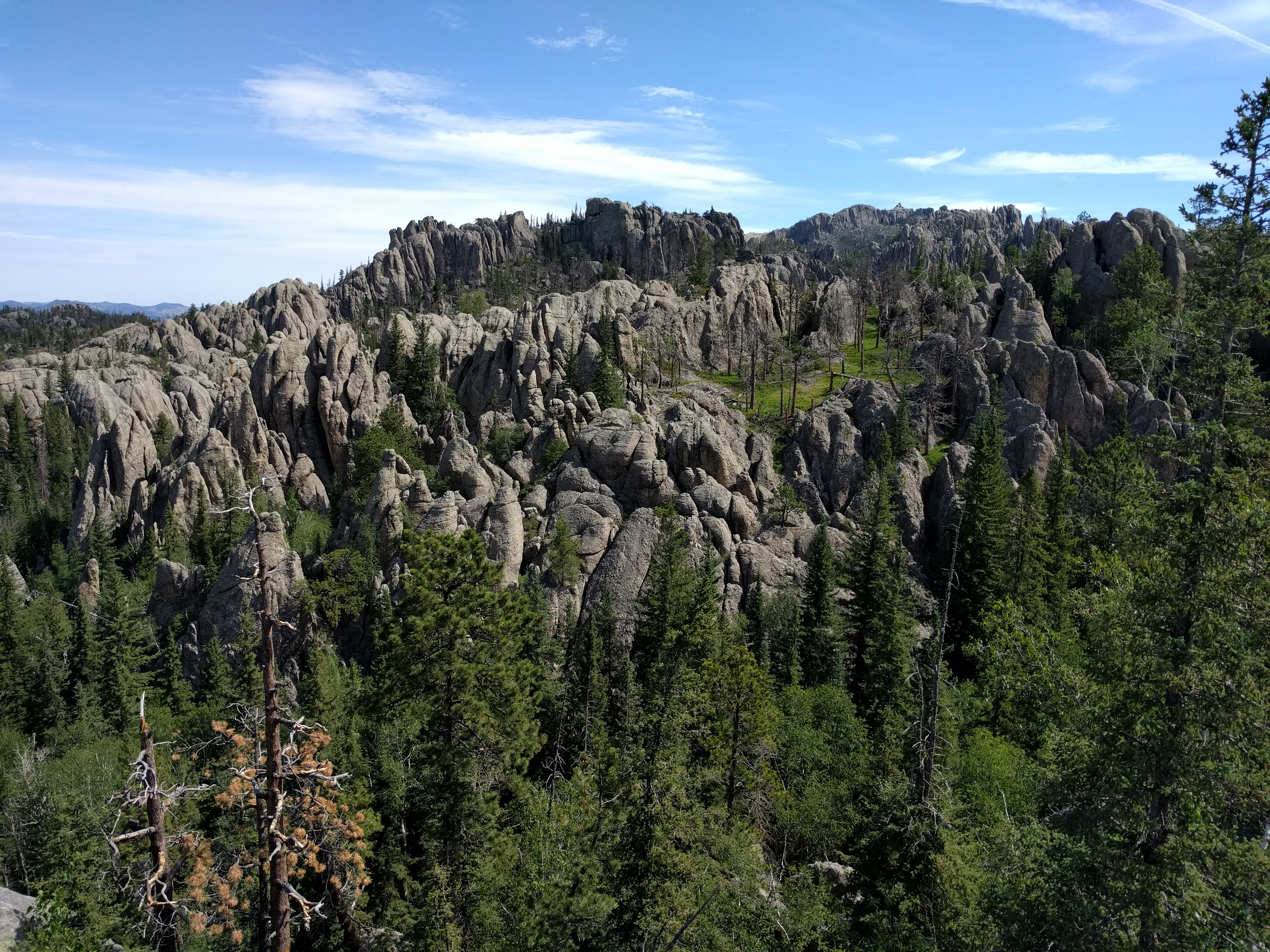
The granite core of the Black Hills rises 7,244 feet (2,208 m) at Black Elk Peak

The 'bull's eye' of this target is called the granite core. The granite of the Black Hills was emplaced by magma generated during the Trans-Hudson orogeny and contains abundant pegmatite. The core of the Black Hills has been dated to 1.8 billion years. Other localized deposits have been dated to around 2.2 to 2.8 billion years. One of these is located in the northern hills. It is called French Creek Granite although it has been metamorphosed into gneiss. The other is called the Bear Mountain complex, and it is located in the west-central part of the hills.

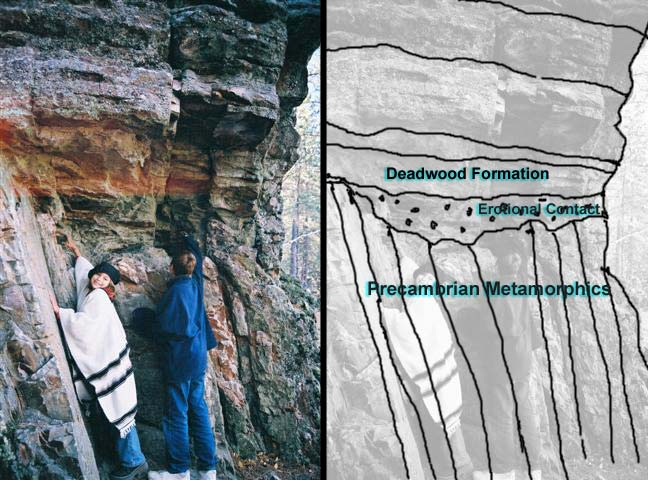
The angular unconformity between the Deadwood Formation and the underlying Precambrian rocks near Rapid City.

Making a concentric ring around the core is the metamorphic zone. The rocks in this ring are all very old, as much as 2 billion years and older. This zone is very complex, filled with many diverse rock types. The rocks were originally sedimentary until there was a collision between the North American continent and a terrane. This collision, called the Trans-Hudson Orogeny, caused the original rocks to fold and twist into a vast mountain range. Over millions of years, these tilted rocks, which in many areas are tilted to 90 degrees or more, eroded. Today we see the evidence of this erosion in the Black Hills, where the metamorphic rocks end in an angular unconformity below the younger sedimentary layers.

=== Paleozoic ===
The final layers of the Black Hills consist of sedimentary rocks. The oldest lie on top of the metamorphic layers at a much shallower angle. This rock called the Deadwood Formation is mostly sandstone and was the source of gold found in the Deadwood area. Above the Deadwood Formation lies the Englewood Formation and Pahasapa limestone, which is the source of the more than 200 caves found in the Black Hills, including Jewel Cave and Wind Cave. The Minnelusa Formation is next and is composed of highly variable sandstones and limestones followed by the Opeche shale and the Minnekahta limestone.

=== Mesozoic ===
The next rock layer, the Spearfish Formation, forms a valley around the hills called the Red Valley and is often referred to as the Race Track. It is mostly red shale with beds of gypsum, and circles much of the Black Hills. These shale and gypsum beds, as well as the nearby limestone beds of the Minnekahta, are used in the manufacture of cement at a cement plant in Rapid City. Next is the shale and sandstone Sundance Formation, which is topped by the Morrison Formation and the Unkpapa sandstone.

The outermost feature of the dome stands out as a hogback ridge. The ridge is made out of the Lakota Formation and the Fallriver sandstone, which are collectively called the Inyan Kara Group. Above this, the layers of rocks are less distinct and are all mainly grey shale with three exceptions: the Newcastle sandstone; the Greenhorn limestone, which contains many shark teeth fossils; and the Niobrara Formation, which is composed mainly of chalk. These outer ridges are called cuestas.

=== Cenozoic ===
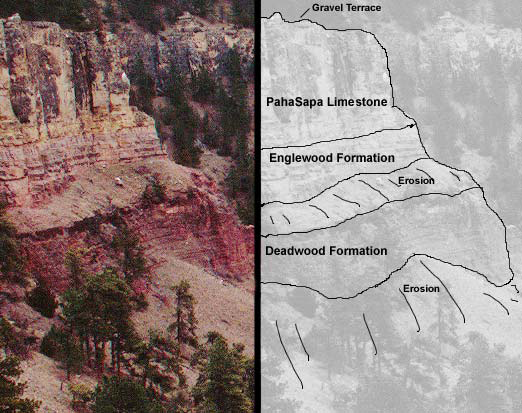
Fallingrock cliff in Dark Canyon. The rock is of Paleozoic age but is capped with a Cenozoic gravel terrace.

The preceding layers were deposited horizontally. All of them can be seen in core samples and well logs from the flattest parts of the Great Plains. It took a period of uplift to bring them to their present topographical levels in the Black Hills. This uplift called the Laramide orogeny, began around the beginning of the Cenozoic and left a line of igneous rocks through the northern hills superimposed on the rocks already discussed. This line extends from Bear Butte in the east to Devils Tower in the west. Evidence of Cenozoic volcanic eruptions, if they happened, has long since been eroded.

The Black Hills also has a 'skirt' of gravel covering them in areas, which are called pediments. Formed as the waterways cut down into the uplifting hills, they represent the former locations of today's rivers. These beds are generally around 10,000 years old or younger, judging by the artifacts and fossils found. A few places, mainly in the high elevations, are older, as old as 20 million years, according to camel and rodent fossils found. Some gravels have been found but for the most part, these older beds have been eroded.

==== Holocene ====
Stratigraphic records indicate environmental changes in the land, such as flood and drought patterns. For example, large-scale flooding of the Black Hill basins occurs at a probability rate of 0.01, making such floods occur on average once in every 100 years. During The Medieval Climate Anomaly, or the Medieval Warm Period, flooding increased in the basins. A stratigraphic record of the area shows that during these 400 years, thirteen 100-year floods occurred in four of the region's basins, while the same four basins from the previous 800 years only experienced nine floods.

== Biodiversity ==
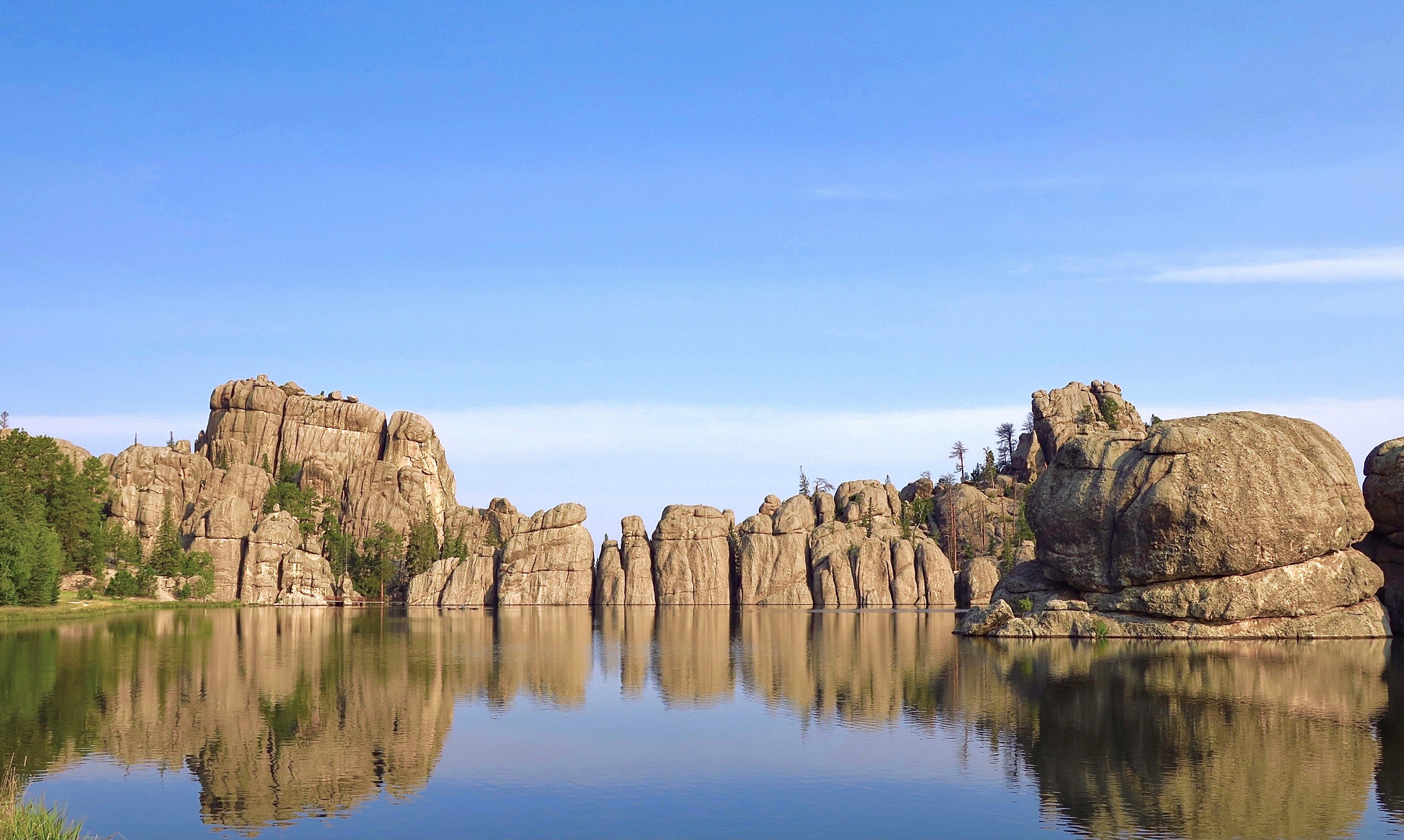
Sylvan Lake, located in Custer State Park

As with the geology, the biology of the Black Hills is complex. Most of the Hills are a fire-climax ponderosa pine forest, with Black Hills spruce (Picea glauca var. densata) occurring in cool moist valleys of the Northern Hills. Oddly, this endemic variety of spruce does not occur in the moist Bear Lodge Mountains, which make up most of the Wyoming portion of the Black Hills. Large open parks (mountain meadows) with lush grassland rather than forest are scattered through the Hills (especially the western portion), and the southern edge of the Black Hills mountains, due to the rain shadow of the higher elevations, are covered by a dry pine savannah, with stands of mountain mahogany and Rocky Mountain juniper.

Wildlife is both diverse and plentiful. Black Hills creeks are known for their trout, while the forests and grasslands offer good habitat for American bison, white-tailed and mule deer, pronghorn, bighorn sheep, mountain lions, and a variety of smaller animals, like prairie dogs, American martens, American red squirrels, Northern flying squirrels, yellow-bellied marmots, and fox squirrels. Biologically, the Black Hills is a meeting and mixing place, with species common to regions to the east, west, north, and south. It supports some endemic taxa, including white-winged junco (Junco hyemalis aikeni). Some other endemics are Cooper's Rocky Mountain snail, Black Hills subspecies of red-bellied snake, and a Black Hills subspecies of southern red-backed vole. Some birds that are only in the Black Hills and not the rest of South Dakota are pinyon jay, Canada jay, three-toed woodpecker, black-backed woodpecker, American dipper, ruffed grouse, and others.

== Regions of the Black Hills ==
Black Hills National Forest Districts Map

The northern Black Hills approximate Lawrence and Meade Counties and are roughly equivalent to the Northern Hills District of the Black Hills National Forest. The central Black Hills (the Mystic District of the Black Hills National Forest) are located in Pennington County west of Rapid City. The southern Black Hills are in Custer and Fall River Counties and are administered in the national forest's Hell Canyon District. Finally, Wyoming's Black Hills follow the Bearlodge District, approximately Weston and Crook Counties.

Geologically separate from the Black Hills are the Elk Mountains, a small range forming the southwest portion of the region.

== Tourism and economy ==
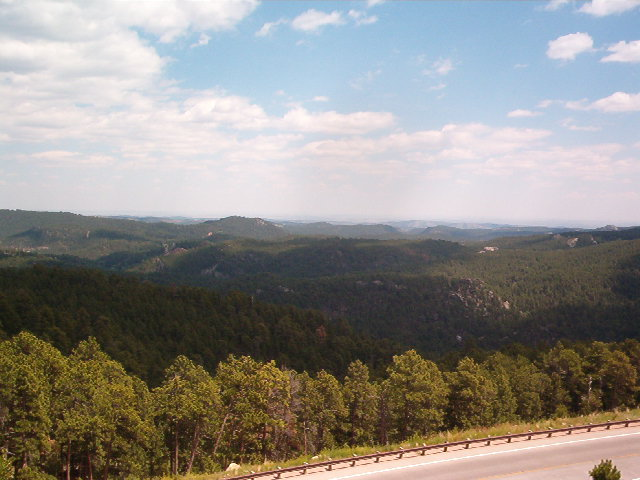
Black Hills opposite Mount Rushmore

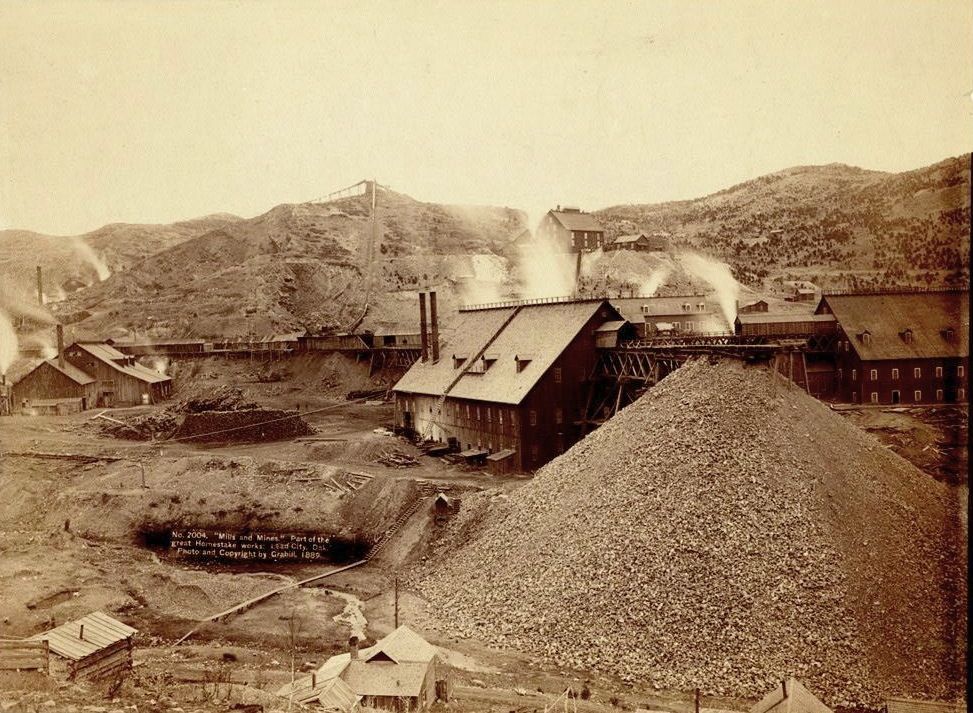
Homestake Mine in 1889

The region is home to Mount Rushmore National Memorial, Wind Cave National Park, Jewel Cave National Monument, Black Elk Peak, Custer State Park (the largest state park in South Dakota, and one of the largest in the US), Bear Butte State Park, Devils Tower National Monument, and the Crazy Horse Memorial. The Black Hills also hosts the Sturgis Motorcycle Rally each August. The rally was started in 1940 and the 65th Rally in 2005 saw more than 550,000 bikers visit the Black Hills. It is a key part of the regional economy.

The South Dakota Centennial Trail is a hiking and mountain biking trail which opened in 1989 to celebrate the 100th anniversary of South Dakota becoming a state. It traverses 123 miles through Wind Cave National Park, Custer State Park, the Black Hills National Forest, Fort Meade Recreation Area, and Bear Butte State Park.

The George S. Mickelson Trail is a recently opened multi-use path through the Black Hills that follows the abandoned track of the historic railroad route from Edgemont to Deadwood. The train used to be the only way to bring supplies to the miners in the Hills. The trail is about 110 miles (180 km) in length, and can be used by hikers, cross-country skiers, and cyclists. The cost is $4 per day or $15 annually.

Today, the major city in the Black Hills is Rapid City, with an incorporated population of roughly 81,000 and a metropolitan population of 156,000. It serves a market area covering much of five states: North and South Dakota, Nebraska, Wyoming, and Montana. In addition to tourism and mining (including coal, specialty minerals, and the now declining gold mining), the Black Hills economy includes ranching (sheep and cattle, primarily, with bison and ratites becoming more common), timber (lumber), Ellsworth Air Force Base, and some manufacturing, including Black Hills gold jewelry, cement, electronics, cabinetry, guns and ammunition.

In many ways, the Black Hills functions as a very spread-out urban area with a population (not counting tourists) of 250,000. Other important Black Hills cities and towns include:

- Belle Fourche, a ranching town
- Custer, a mining and tourism town and headquarters for Black Hills National Forest
- Deadwood, a historic and well-preserved gambling mecca
- Hill City, a timber and tourism town in the center of the Hills, where the Black Hills Central Railroad operates historic steam trains over the former CB&Q line to Keystone
- Hot Springs, an old resort town in the southern Hills
- Keystone, a tourism town just outside Mount Rushmore
- Lead, home of the now-closed Homestake Mine (gold) and the Sanford Underground Research Facility
- Newcastle, center of the Black Hills petroleum production and refining
- Spearfish, home of Black Hills State University
- Sturgis, originally a military town (Fort Meade, now a VA center, is located just to the east).

== In popular culture ==
- In the film National Treasure: Book of Secrets, the Black Hills are the site of the fabulous and mythical Aztec city of gold of Cibola. Scenes were shot at Mount Rushmore and Sylvan Lake in Custer State Park. Filming at Mount Rushmore took longer than expected and a decision was made to film more scenes in the Black Hills due to the backdrop of the Hills.
- The Beatles song "Rocky Raccoon” takes place in the Black Hills.
- The Pain of Salvation song "Black Hills" from the album One Hour by the Concrete Lake is about the Black Hills.

== See also ==
- The Black Hills of Dakota (song)

== Bibliography ==
- Ostler, Jeffrey (2010). The Lakotas and the Black Hills: The Struggle for Sacred Ground. New York: Penguin. ISBN 978-0-14-311920-3.
- Reed, Paula S; Wallace, Edith B (2016). Shrine of Democracy and Sacred Stone: Historic Resource Study, Mount Rushmore National Memorial, South Dakota (PDF) (Report). Hagerstown, MD: Paula S. Reed & Associates / National Park Service.
- Zieske, Scott (Spring 1985). "Fly Fishing in the Black Hills ca 1910" (PDF). The American Fly Fisher. 12 (2). Manchester, VT: American Museum of Fly Fishing: 22–25. Archived from the original (PDF) on September 6, 2015.
