= Black Elk Wilderness =

Wilderness area in South Dakota, United States

- IUCN category Ib (wilderness area)
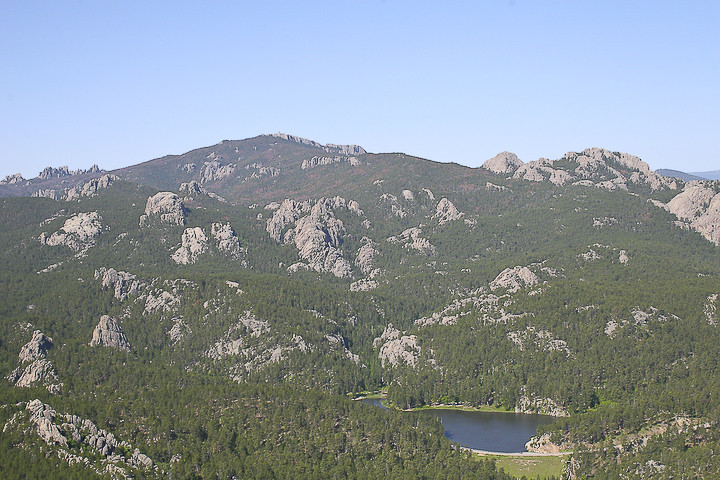
- View looking towards the Black Elk Wilderness. Horsethief Lake, on the edge of the wilderness area, is seen in the foreground.

- Location within the United States
- Location: Pennington / Custer counties, South Dakota, USA
- Nearest city: Rapid City, SD
- Coordinates: 43°51′N 103°32′W
- Area: 13,426 acres (54.33 km^{2})
- Established: 1980
- Governing body: U.S. Forest Service

The Black Elk Wilderness is a nature preserve located in the U.S. state of South Dakota. The wilderness was designated by an act of Congress in 1980. Managed by the U.S. Forest Service, Black Elk Wilderness is part of Black Hills National Forest. This 13,426 acre (54 km^{2}) region is considered sacred to Native Americans, especially the Sioux and is named after Black Elk, an Oglala Sioux holy man. Mount Rushmore National Memorial is immediately to the north and much of the rest of the wilderness is bordered by other protected land under the jurisdiction of state and federal agencies.

Black Elk Peak, which at 7,242 feet (2,207 m) is the tallest mountain in South Dakota, is located in the wilderness, and one can see into four different states from the summit. The wilderness also contains about 8 miles of the South Dakota Centennial Trail. Craggy peaks and rocky slopes mixed with ponderosa pine, spruce and fir trees make for a varied ecosystem. Mountain goats and bighorn sheep inhabit the more rugged mountain slopes, while mule deer, whitetail deer, and elk are more common in the forested valleys. A sizeable population of hawks and falcons also inhabit the wilderness.

U.S. Wilderness Areas do not allow motorized or mechanized vehicles, including bicycles. Although camping and fishing are allowed with proper permit, no roads or buildings are constructed and there is also no logging or mining, in compliance with the 1964 Wilderness Act. Wilderness areas within National Forests and Bureau of Land Management areas also allow hunting in season. By 2010, 80 percent of the trees in the wilderness had been killed by the Mountain pine beetle.

== See also ==
- List of U.S. Wilderness Areas
- Wilderness Act
- Black Elk Speaks
