= Black Hills National Forest =

U.S. national forest located in the states of South Dakota and Wyoming

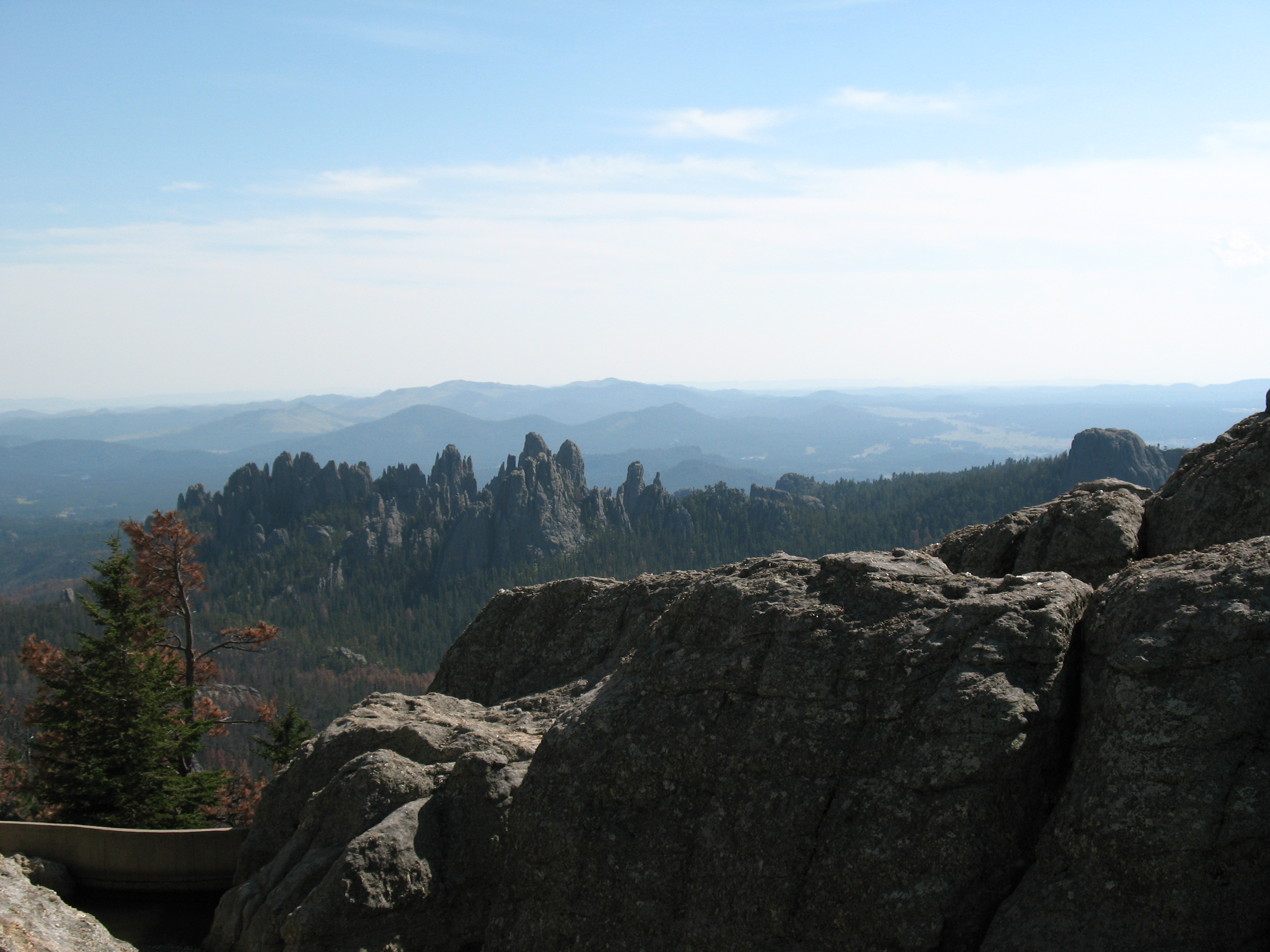
- The Needles from Black Elk Peak in Black Hills National Forest

- Location within the United States
- Location: Pennington, Custer, Lawrence, Fall River, and Meade counties, South Dakota; Crook and Weston counties, Wyoming, United States
- Nearest city: Rapid City, South Dakota
- Coordinates: 43°56′11″N 103°43′40″W
- Area: 1,253,308 acres (5,071.96 km^{2})
- Established: February 22, 1897
- Governing body: U.S. Forest Service
- Website: Black Hills National Forest

Black Hills National Forest is located in southwestern South Dakota and northeastern Wyoming, United States. The forest has an area of over 1.25 million acres (5,066 km^{2}) and is managed by the Forest Service. Forest headquarters are located in Custer, South Dakota. There are local ranger district offices in Custer, Rapid City, and Spearfish in South Dakota, and in Sundance, Wyoming.

Predominantly ponderosa pine, the forest also includes hard woods like aspen, bur oak, and birch. The lower elevations include grassland prairie, but the National Forest System lands encompass most of the mountainous region known as the Black Hills of South Dakota and Wyoming. Within the forest is Black Elk Peak which is the tallest mountain in South Dakota and the highest peak east of the Rocky Mountains in the United States.

== History ==
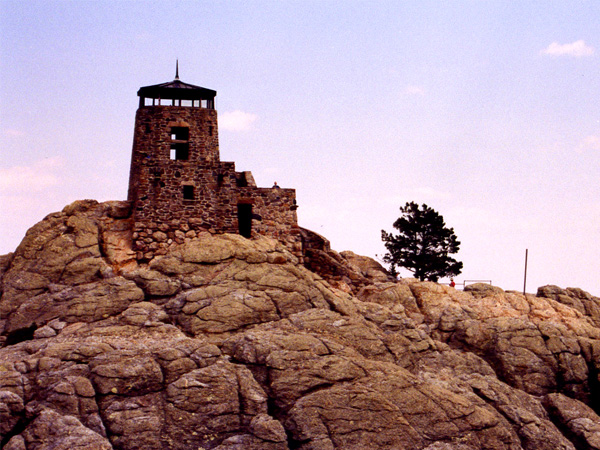
Fire tower atop Black Elk Peak

After a series of devastating wildfires in 1893, U.S. President Grover Cleveland created the Black Hills Forest Reserve on February 22, 1897. U.S. President William McKinley issued a presidential proclamation on September 19, 1898, appending the Black Hills Forest Reserve geographic boundaries while acknowledging the forest preservation decrees established by the Timber Culture Act and Forest Reserve Act of 1891. Upon the creation of the Forest Service in 1905, the reserve was transferred to the new agency under the United States Department of Agriculture and redesignated as a National Forest two years later. Lakota words pahá sápa meaning "hills that are black" (literally "black hills" as the adjectives (sápa) follow the noun) may be one of the factors in the regions naming. Early settlers and explorers called the Laramie Range the Black Hills prior to Lt. G. K. Warren's expedition in 1857. Prior to explorations by the La Verendrye brothers in 1742, many tribes frequented the Black Hills including Ponca, Kiowa Apache, Arapaho, Kiowa and Cheyenne for at least the past 10,000 years. The smallpox epidemics of 1771 to 1781 broke the will of the Arikara who prior to that time held the Sioux east of the Missouri. American Horse's winter count of 1775-76 is interpreted as depicting the Sioux discovery of the Black Hills. The mountains and other key features in and around the Black Hills and now within the Forest were considered sacred to indigenous peoples and many came here on vision quests, for hunting and for trade.

The Black Hills National Forest provided the Capitol Christmas Tree in 1997, a 63-foot white spruce.

== Geography ==
The forest is located in parts of seven counties in South Dakota and Wyoming. In descending order of forestland area they are Pennington, Custer, Lawrence, Crook, Fall River, Meade, and Weston counties. (Crook and Weston are the only counties in Wyoming; only one-seventh of the forest acreage lies in Wyoming.)

The Forest is located immediately west and south of Rapid City and can be accessed from Interstate 90. The forest headquarters is located in Custer, South Dakota. The Peter Norbeck National Scenic Byway passes through the forest in proximity to Mount Rushmore and along with the Spearfish Canyon National Forest Scenic Byway, provide two of the more scenic drives in the Country.

Although surrounded by Black Hills National Forest, both Jewel Cave National Monument and Mount Rushmore National Memorial are separate areas administered by the National Park Service. Wind Cave National Park, which is another area administered by the National Park Service, borders portions of the forest in the southeast. Black Elk Wilderness is a wilderness within the Forest and no motorized transport is permitted. Outside of the wilderness, mining, logging, and ranching are permitted on public lands through land leases with companies and private parties, referred to as "permittees."

The Black Hills National Forest encompasses three distinct mountain ranges: the Black Hills and the Elk Mountains in South Dakota as well as the Bear Lodge Mountains in Wyoming. The Black Hills are by far the largest of the three ranges.

== Flora and fauna ==
While ponderosa pine is the most common tree species found in the forest, spruce can be found in the higher elevations. Elk, mule deer, pronghorn, and white-tailed deer are commonly seen.

Conifers along a creek in the Black Hills National Forest, South Dakota, 2026

Black bears have been spotted in the Black Hills. Cougars are increasing dramatically as a result of prolific herds of deer and elk. Coyotes, bighorn sheep and mountain goats are also frequently seen by visitors. Bald eagles, hawks, osprey, peregrine falcon and another two hundred species of birds can be found in this forest, especially along streams and near water sources.

== Recreation ==
30 campgrounds are located in the forest and there are 11 reservoirs that are well stocked for sport fishing. 450 miles (725 km) of hiking trails (including the South Dakota Centennial Trail) and hundreds of miles of equestrian trails provide access to more remote destinations and to the summit of Black Elk Peak. With over 5,000 miles (8,000 km) of Forest system roads, the Forest is also a haven for motorized travel.

== Gallery ==
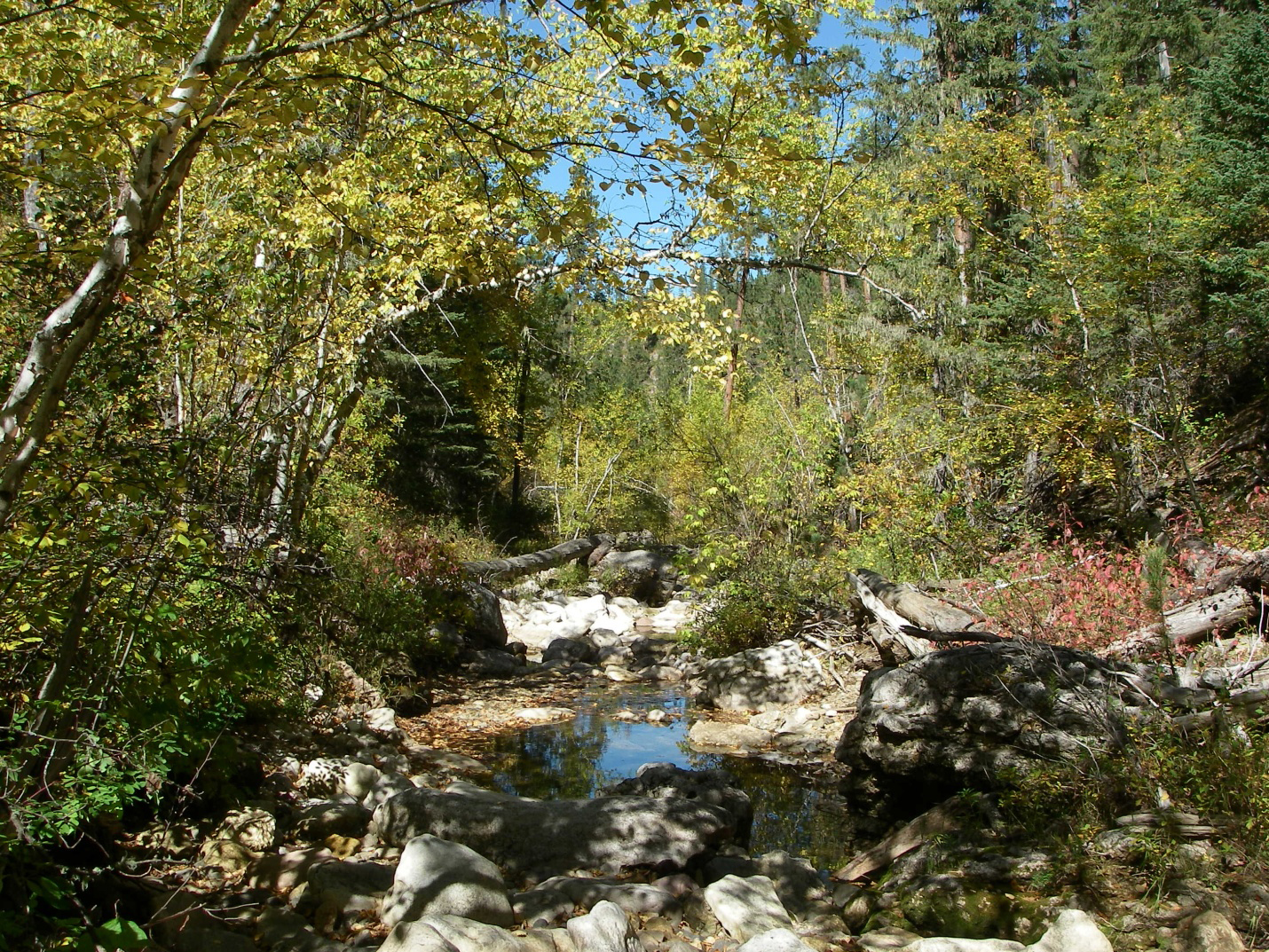
The Bear and Beaver Gulches Botanical Area

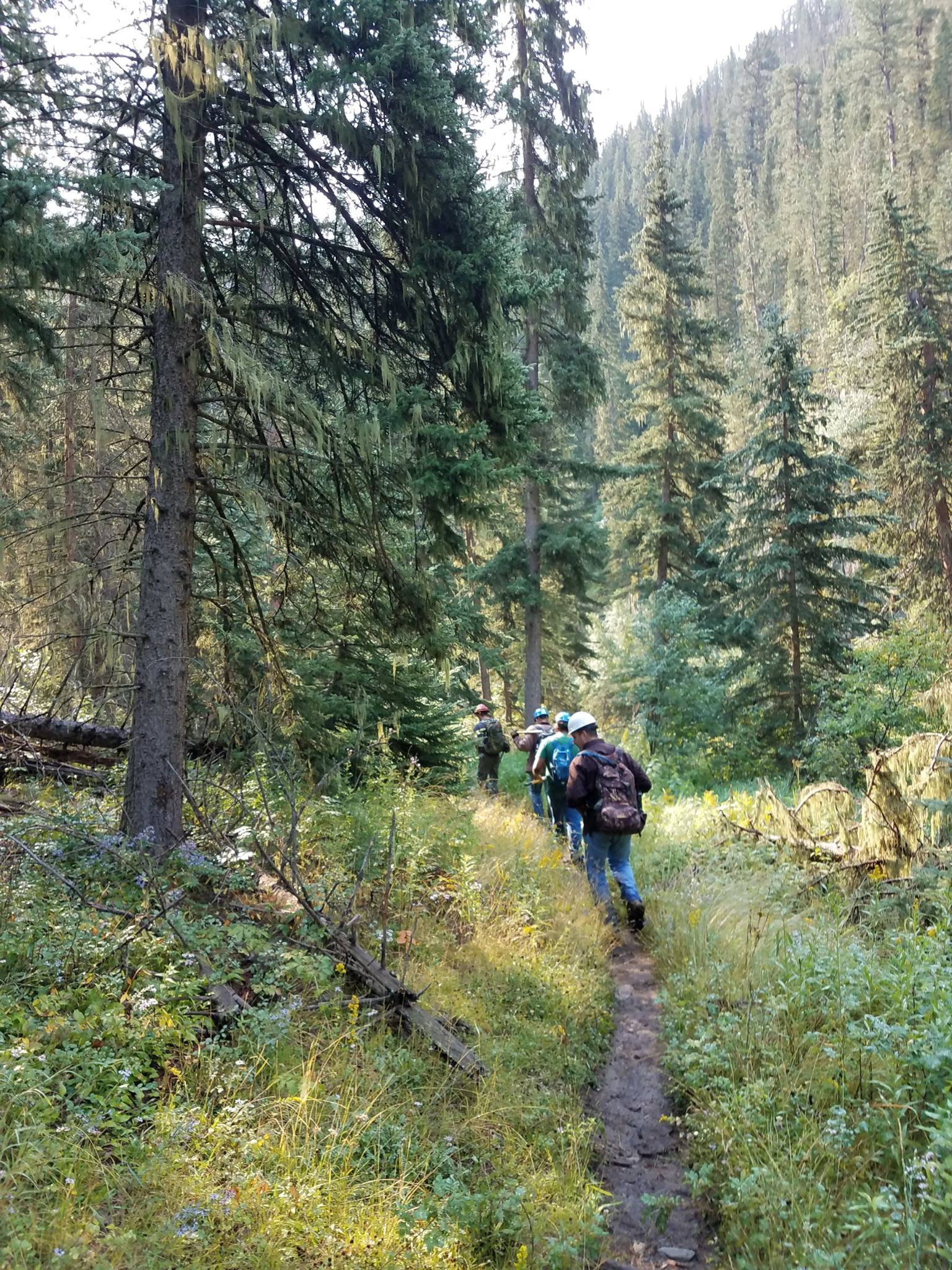
Hikers on the Deerfield Trail

A map of the Ranger Districts

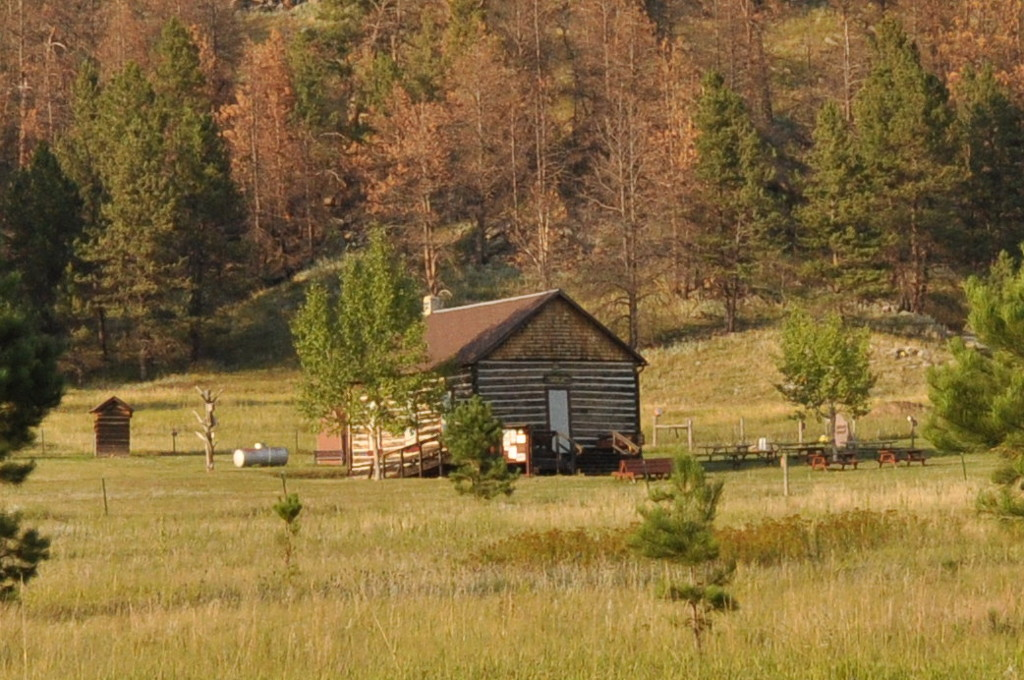
The Cold Springs Schoolhouse in Custer County

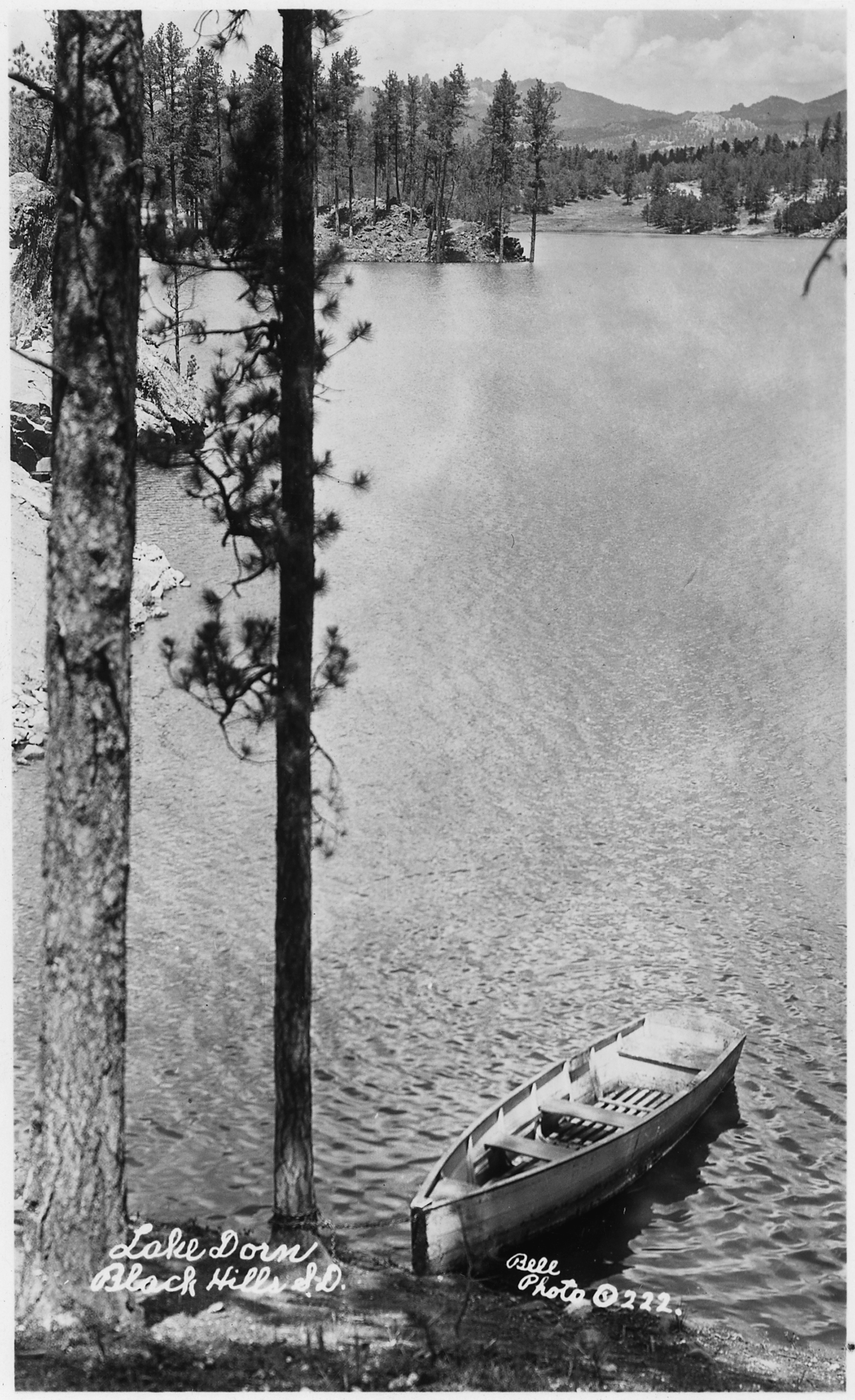
Lake Dorn circa 1940

== See also ==
- List of national forests of the United States
