= Black Elk Peak =

Highest point in South Dakota

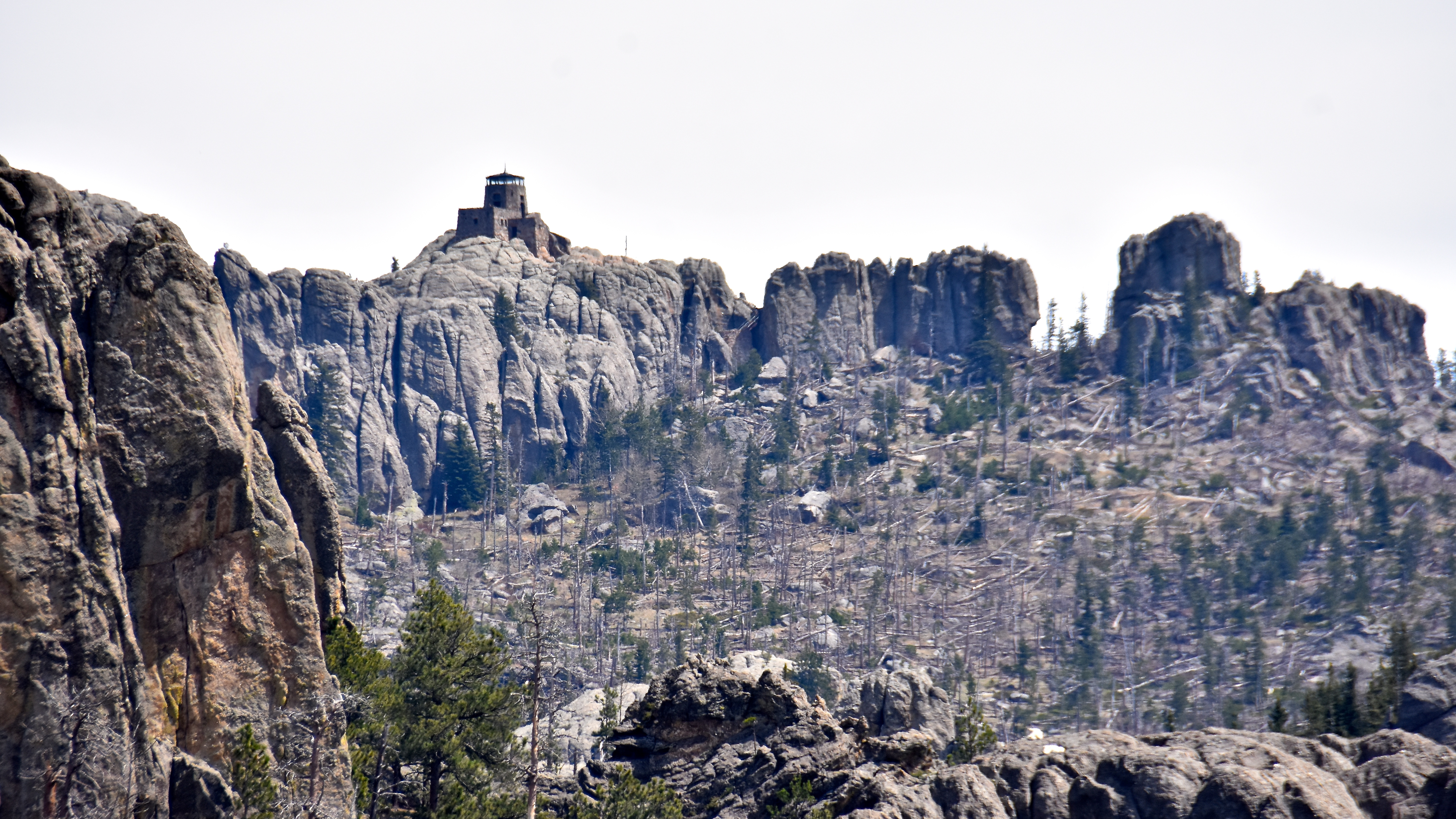
- Black Elk Peak, the highest point in South Dakota viewed from Black Elk Peak Trail, May 2018

Highest point
- Elevation: 7,244 ft (2,208 m) NAVD 88
- Prominence: 2,922 ft (891 m)
- Listing: North America isolated peaks 87th; U.S. state high point 15th
- Coordinates: 43°51′57″N 103°31′57″W

Geography
- Location within South Dakota Location within the United States
- Country: United States
- State: South Dakota
- County: Pennington County
- Parent range: Black Hills
- Topo map: USGS Custer

Climbing
- First ascent: July 24, 1875 by Valentine McGillycuddy and party
- Easiest route: hike, Trail 9

Black Elk Peak, formerly known as Harney Peak and also known as Hiŋháŋ Káǧa ('owl-maker') and Heȟáka Sápa ('elk black') in Lakota, is the highest natural point in the Black Hills mountain range and the U.S. state of South Dakota. It lies in the Black Elk Wilderness area, in southern Pennington County, in the Black Hills. The peak lies 3.7 mi (6.0 km) west-southwest of Mount Rushmore. At 7,244 feet (2,208 m), It was once discussed to be a potential candidate for the highest summit in the United States east of the Rocky Mountains, though definitions vary based on geographic classification as the Black Hills are geologically related to the greater Rocky Mountain Front. Lost Mine Peak, in the Chisos Mountains of Texas, lies approximately 16 miles further east based on the measurement of longitude at 103°15'30"W and stands at 7,547 feet (2,300 m). The Black Hills are part of the North American Cordillera and generally considered to be geologically related to the Rocky Mountains and were formed by the same uplift as the other surrounding subranges of the Rocky Mountain Front.

The U.S. Board on Geographic Names, which has jurisdiction in federal lands, officially changed the mountain's name from Harney Peak to Black Elk Peak on August 11, 2016, honoring Black Elk, the noted Lakota Sioux medicine man and Catholic Servant of God for whom the Wilderness Area is named.

In September 2016, a team of professional surveyors obtained precise GNSS data over the course of two days and found the highest natural rock to be at 7,231.32 feet (2,204.11 m) NAVD88 and a nearby secondary peak located approximately 300 feet south of the lookout tower and unofficially named "McGillicuddy's Peak", to be slightly lower at 7,229.41 feet (2,203.52 m) NAVD88. This is believed to be the only precise survey that has been made to determine the true elevation of this peak.

The peak is home to the Harney Fire Lookout on the summit at the end of the trail. The tower and the staircase leading to it, as well as a nearby dam and pumphouse, were listed on the National Register of Historic Places in 1983.

== Name ==
This peak was called Hiŋháŋ Káǧa, or, "Owl maker," after rock formations that look like owls (and the association of owls with impending death by the Lakota Sioux). They dominated this region and inhabited the territory at the time of European colonization. They considered it a sacred site within the Black Hills, which they call Pahá Sápa.

The mountain was named Harney Peak in 1855 by American Lieutenant Gouverneur K. Warren in honor of US General William S. Harney, his commander in a regional military expedition. In punitive retaliation for other Sioux raids, in September 1855 Harney's forces killed Sicangu warriors, women and children in what Americans called the Battle of Blue Water Creek in Garden County, Nebraska.

Harney later commanded the United States military in the Black Hills area in the late 1870s. The Lakota had tried to get the name of the peak changed for 50 years, as Harney had massacred their people.

In 2014 the Sioux renewed their effort to get the name changed, in an effort led by Basil Brave Heart of the Pine Ridge Indian Reservation. A Korean War veteran, he felt that Harney had not honored the military with his action.

Some Lakota requested state officials in 2015 to reinstate their original name for the peak. The Lakota Council of the Pine Ridge Reservation and descendants of Black Elk, a noted medicine man who converted to Catholicism, supported naming it for him, as the wilderness area around the peak is named for the shaman. He became known beyond the Lakota in part through the book Black Elk Speaks (1932), written by John G. Neihardt from long talks with the shaman. South Dakota Governor Dennis Daugaard opposed the name change, as did other state officials, and no action was taken in 2015.

The U.S. Board on Geographic Names officially changed the mountain's name from "Harney Peak" to "Black Elk Peak" on August 11, 2016, by a unanimous vote of 12–0, with one abstention. On August 18, 2016, Gov. Daugaard announced that the state would accept the new name.

== History ==
- Harney Peak Lookout Tower, Dam, Pumphouse and Stairway
- U.S. National Register of Historic Places
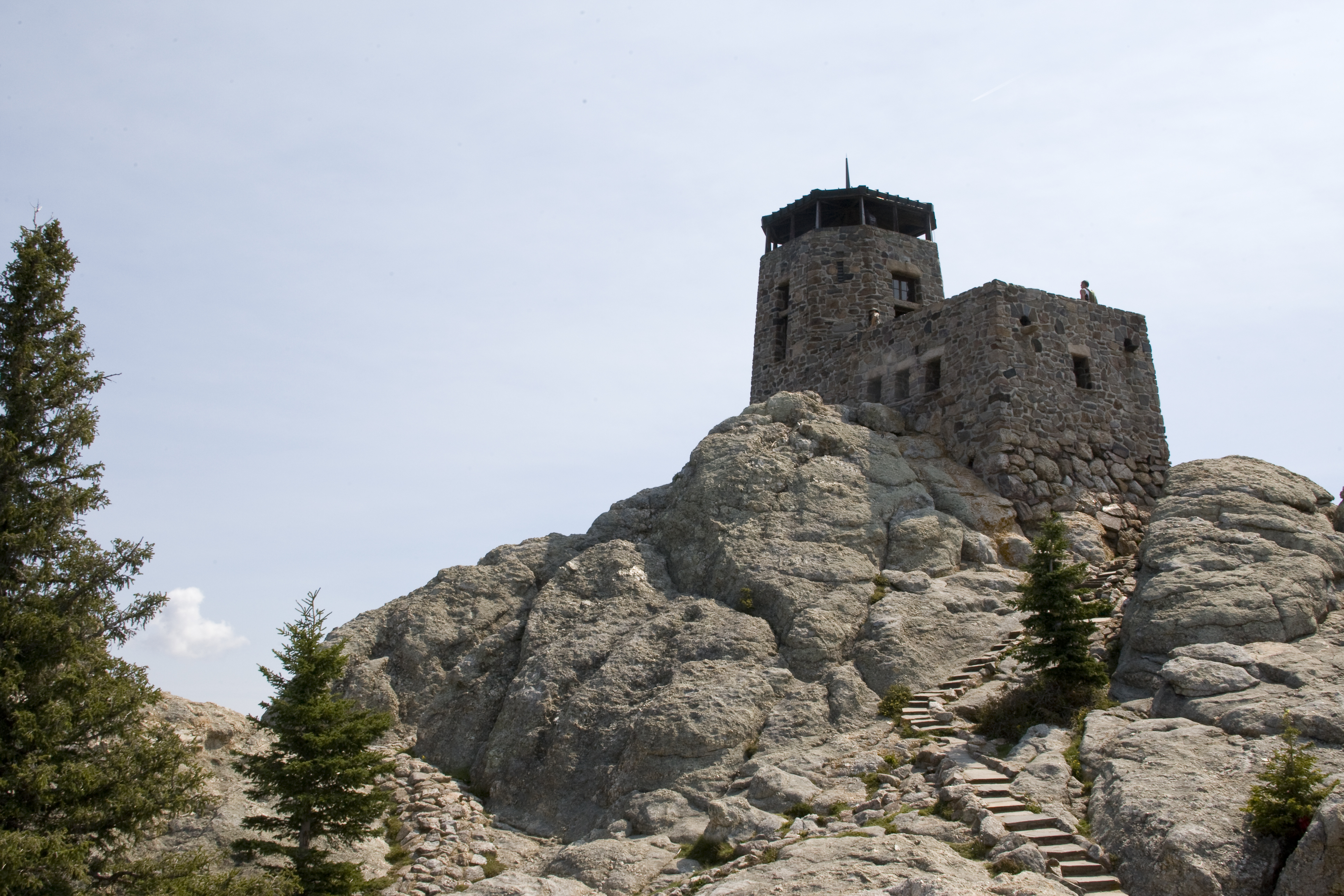
- Fire tower at Black Elk Peak
- Nearest city: Custer, South Dakota
- Area: 4 acres (1.6 ha)
- Built: 1935–1938
- Built by: Civilian Conservation Corps
- NRHP reference No.: 83003019
- Added to NRHP: March 10, 1983

Black Elk Peak and the Black Hills were located within the Great Sioux Reservation established by the United States government in the Treaty of Fort Laramie in 1868; it covered most of the territory west of the Missouri River in South Dakota (the area now called West River). American settlement was concentrated east of the river, where there was more water for farming.

The first American settlers believed to have reached the summit were a party led by General George Armstrong Custer in 1874, during the Black Hills expedition. The federal government took back the Black Hills and another strip of land in a new treaty in 1877. More than a decade later, it broke up the Great Sioux Reservation in 1889 into five smaller reservations, the same year that North Dakota and South Dakota were admitted as states to the Union. The government made some nine million acres of former Lakota land available for purchase for ranching and homesteading. Most American settlement in West River did not start until the early 20th century. The area attracted many European immigrants as well as settlers from the East.

Black Elk Peak is the site where Black Elk (Lakota Sioux) received his "Great Vision" when nine years old. He later became a medicine man known for his wisdom. Late in life, he returned to the peak accompanied by writer John Neihardt. Black Elk was sharing much of his life and philosophy with Neihardt through long talks translated by his son. Neihardt tried to express the medicine man's wisdom in his book Black Elk Speaks (1932). (Note: See chapter 3 and the Author's Postscript of Black Elk Speaks, Bison Books, 2004.)

Neihardt recorded Black Elk's words about his vision as follows:

"I was standing on the highest mountain of them all, and round about beneath me was the whole hoop of the world," he is quoted as saying. "And while I stood there I saw more than I can tell and I understood more than I saw; for I was seeing in a sacred manner the shapes of all things in the spirit, and the shape of all shapes as they must live together like one being."

New York mining promoter James Wilson organized the Harney Peak Tin Company around 1884 or 1885. The Harney Peak Tin Company did not actually mine any tin and was liquidated by court order in the 1890s, losing investors almost $3 million (equivalent to approximately $116 million in 2025) in the largest fraud scandal in Black Hills mining history.

American settlers used Black Elk Peak as a fire lookout tower in 1911, with a wood crate placed at the summit for a seat. In 1920, a 12'x12' wood structure was built, and it was expanded to 16'x16' the following year. The federal Civilian Conservation Corps enlisted local men and completed construction of a stone fire tower in 1938, one of numerous projects in the state during the Great Depression. The Harney Peak fire tower was last staffed in 1967.

A United States post office was operated at Black Elk Peak from 1936 until 1942, and again from 1945 until 1946. The Harney Peak post office was reportedly one of the "most elevated post offices in the United States".

A manmade dam was also created on the peak in 1935. This concrete reservoir holds 5,000 US gallons (19,000 L; 4,200 imp gal) of water; a pumphouse was added in 1938. In 1982, the lookout tower and its stairway, dam, and pumphouse were nominated by the USDA Forest Service for inclusion in the National Register of Historic Places. The Forest Service cited the site's cultural, recreational, and architectural significance to South Dakota. On March 10, 1983, the site was officially added to the register.

== Climate ==
Climate data for Black Elk Peak 43.8697 N, 103.5321 W, Elevation: 6,791 ft (2,070 m) (1991–2020 normals)
Month	Jan	Feb	Mar	Apr	May	Jun	Jul	Aug	Sep	Oct	Nov	Dec	Year
Mean daily maximum °F (°C)	32.9 (0.5)	33.1 (0.6)	40.8 (4.9)	47.1 (8.4)	56.6 (13.7)	67.7 (19.8)	75.5 (24.2)	74.5 (23.6)	66.4 (19.1)	52.3 (11.3)	40.5 (4.7)	33.0 (0.6)	51.7 (11.0)
Daily mean °F (°C)	22.8 (−5.1)	22.8 (−5.1)	29.9 (−1.2)	36.2 (2.3)	45.6 (7.6)	56.1 (13.4)	63.5 (17.5)	62.5 (16.9)	54.3 (12.4)	41.4 (5.2)	30.6 (−0.8)	23.6 (−4.7)	40.8 (4.9)
Mean daily minimum °F (°C)	12.8 (−10.7)	12.4 (−10.9)	19.1 (−7.2)	25.2 (−3.8)	34.7 (1.5)	44.5 (6.9)	51.6 (10.9)	50.4 (10.2)	42.2 (5.7)	30.4 (−0.9)	20.8 (−6.2)	14.3 (−9.8)	29.9 (−1.2)
Average precipitation inches (mm)	0.77 (20)	0.95 (24)	1.41 (36)	2.85 (72)	5.10 (130)	4.09 (104)	4.06 (103)	2.61 (66)	1.86 (47)	1.75 (44)	0.91 (23)	0.77 (20)	27.13 (689)
Source: PRISM Climate Group

== Hiking ==
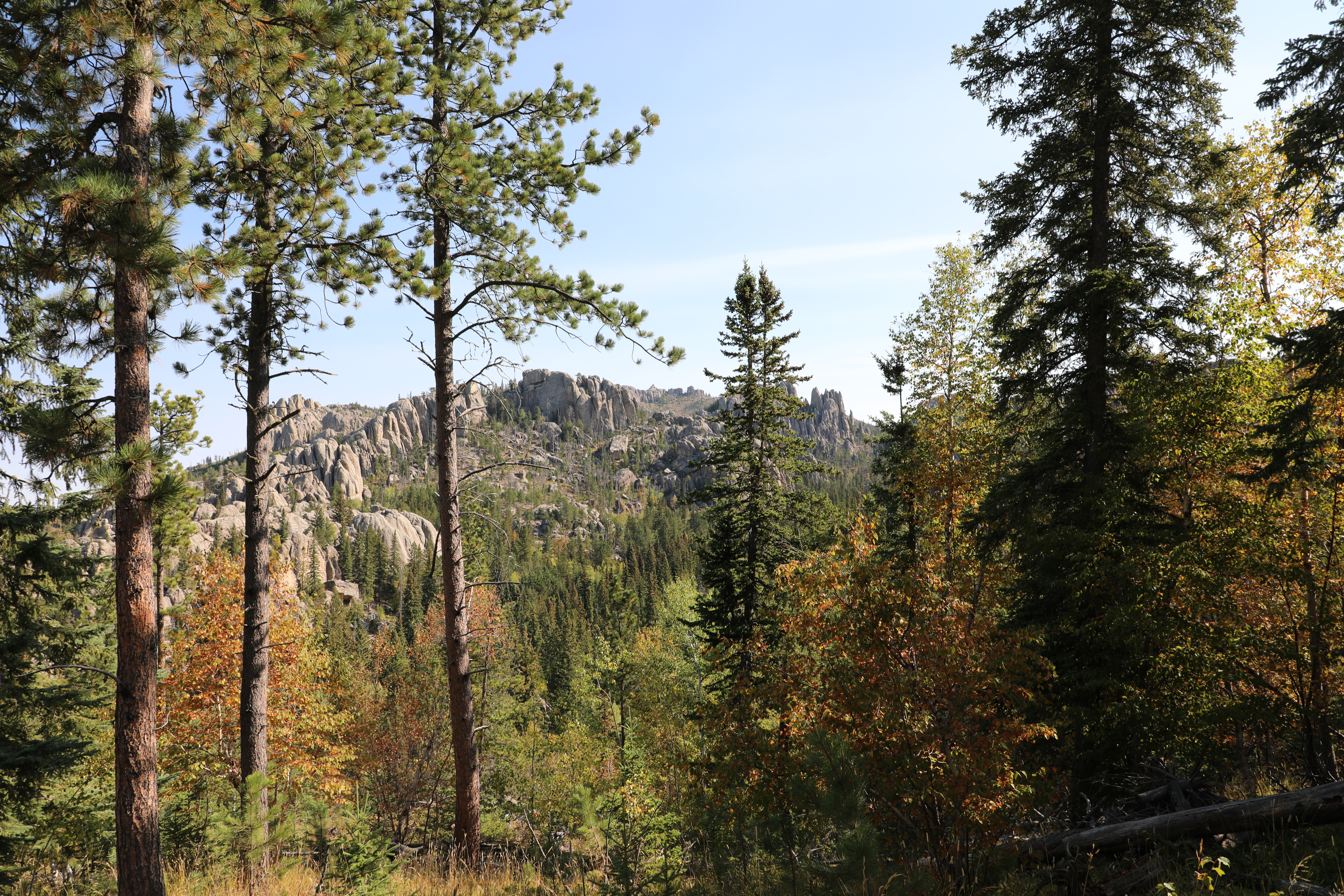
View of Black Elk Peak from hiking trail

The summit can be reached from multiple routes in the Black Elk Wilderness area, beginning at Sylvan Lake, Camp Remington, Highway 244, Palmer Creek Rd., Mount Rushmore, or Horse Thief Lake. From the trailhead at Sylvan Lake in Custer State Park, to the summit and back is about 7 miles (11 km). This is the shortest, least strenuous, and most popular route. No permit is required for use of the trail. However, A South Dakota State Parks pass is required to access the Sylvan Lake trailhead which is located in Custer State Park.

An old stone tower, once used as a fire lookout tower, is located at the summit. The ashes of Valentine McGillycuddy were interred near the base of the tower and a plaque reads, "Valentine McGillycuddy, Wasicu Wakan." Wasicu Wakan is Lakota for "Holy White Man."

== Gallery ==
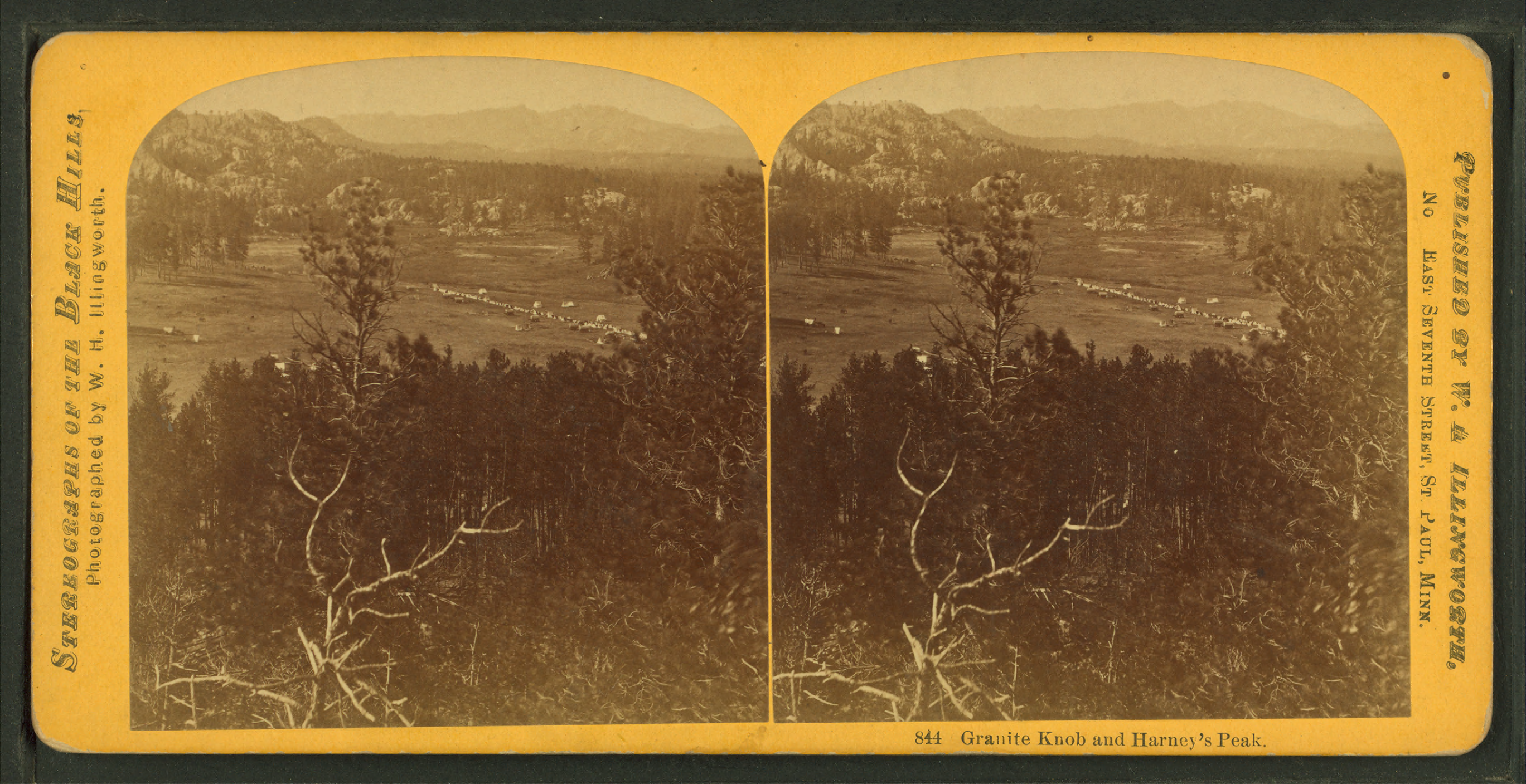
Granite Knob and Harney's Peak, by William H. Illingworth, 1874

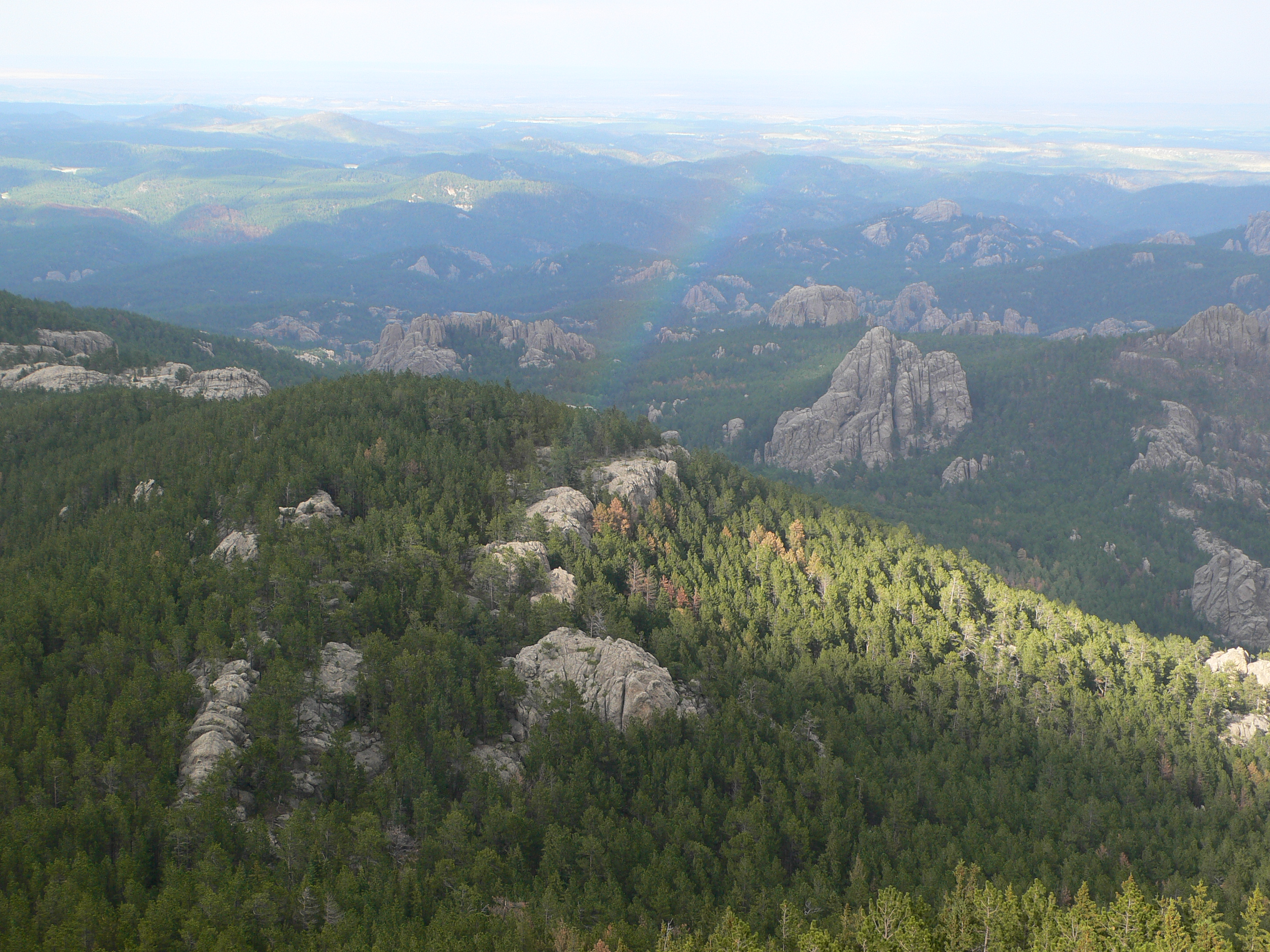
View from the top of the Black Elk Peak lookout tower

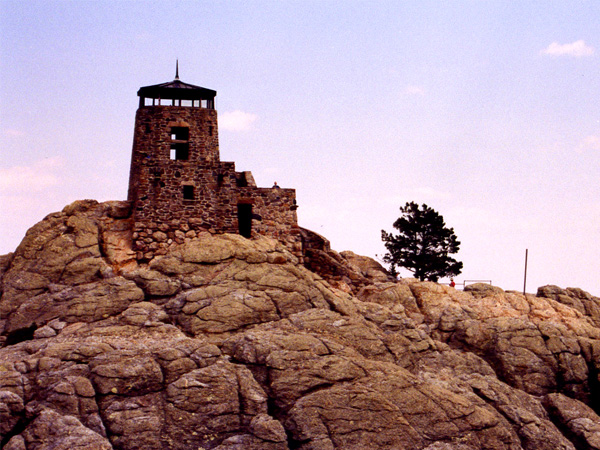
Fire lookout tower at the summit

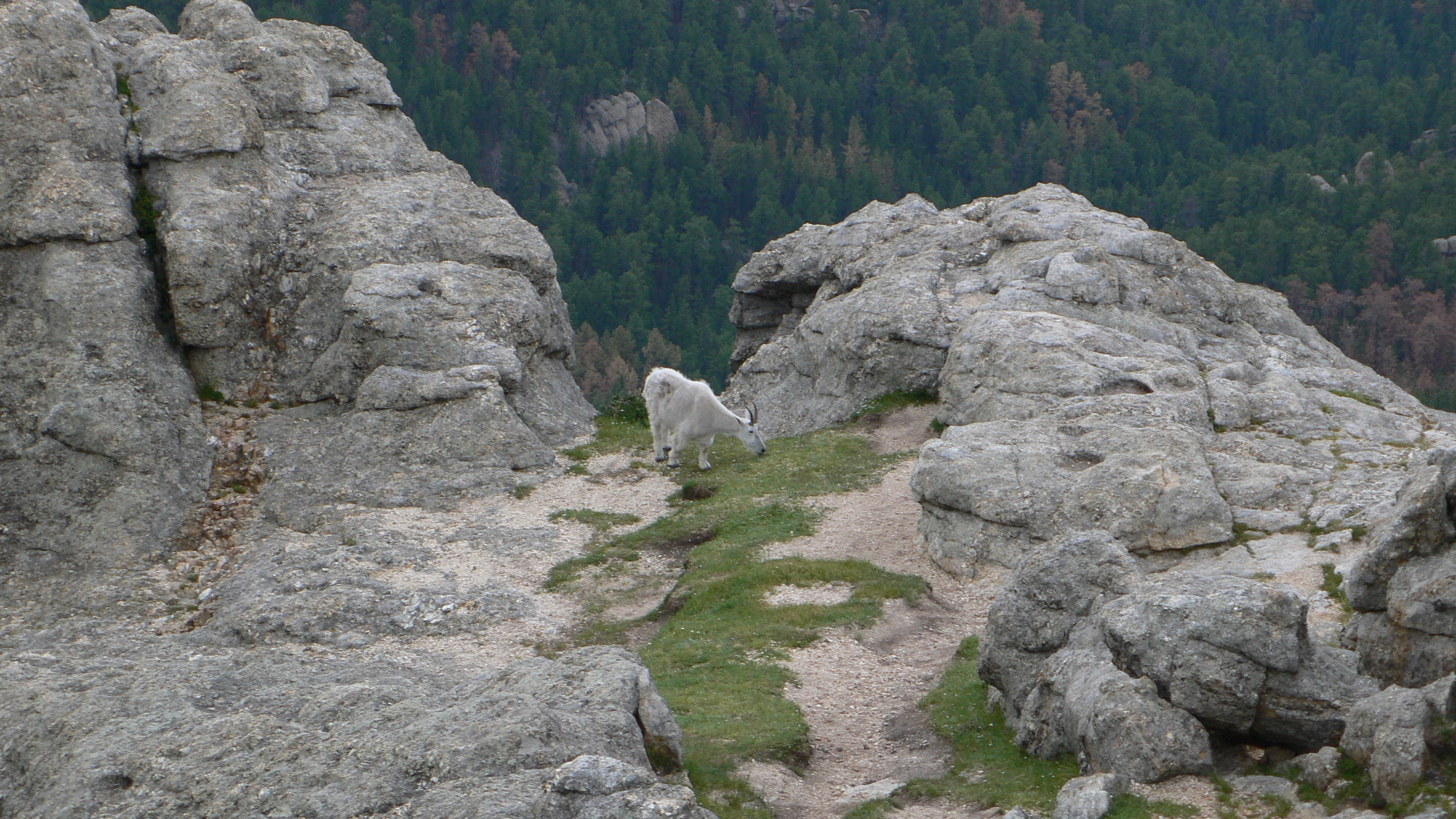
A Mountain goat near the top of Black Elk Peak

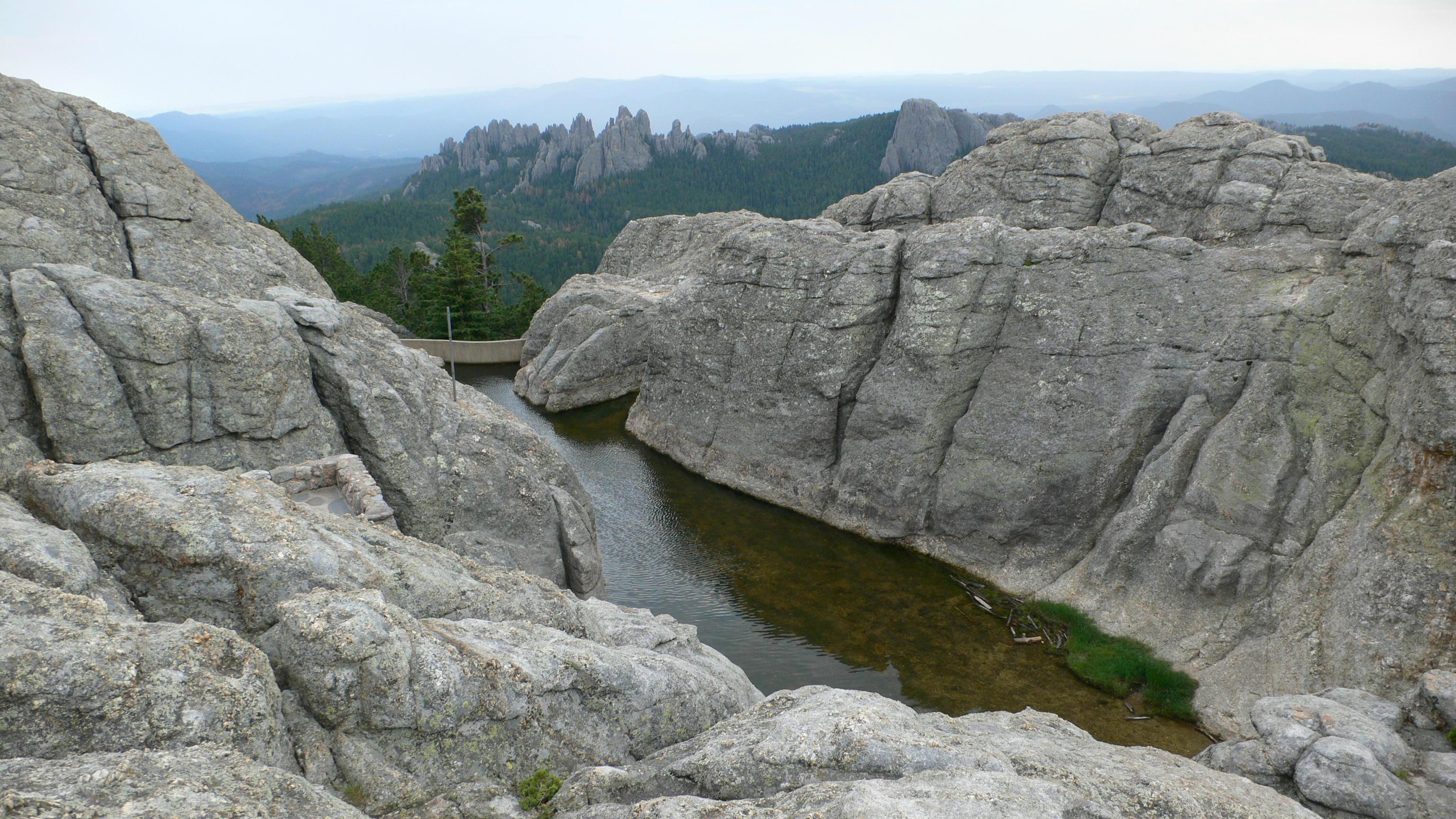
A man-made dam is located near the summit.

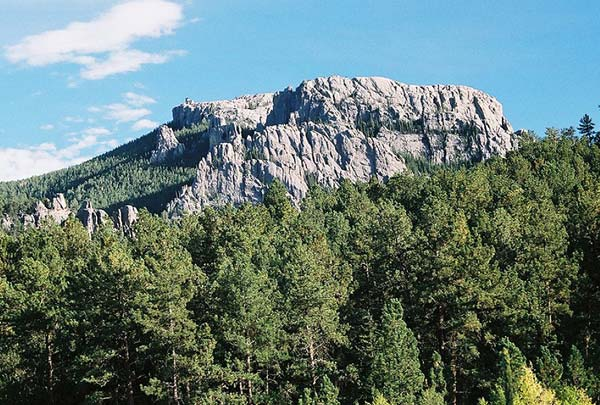
Black Elk Peak from Palmer Gulch (August 2006)

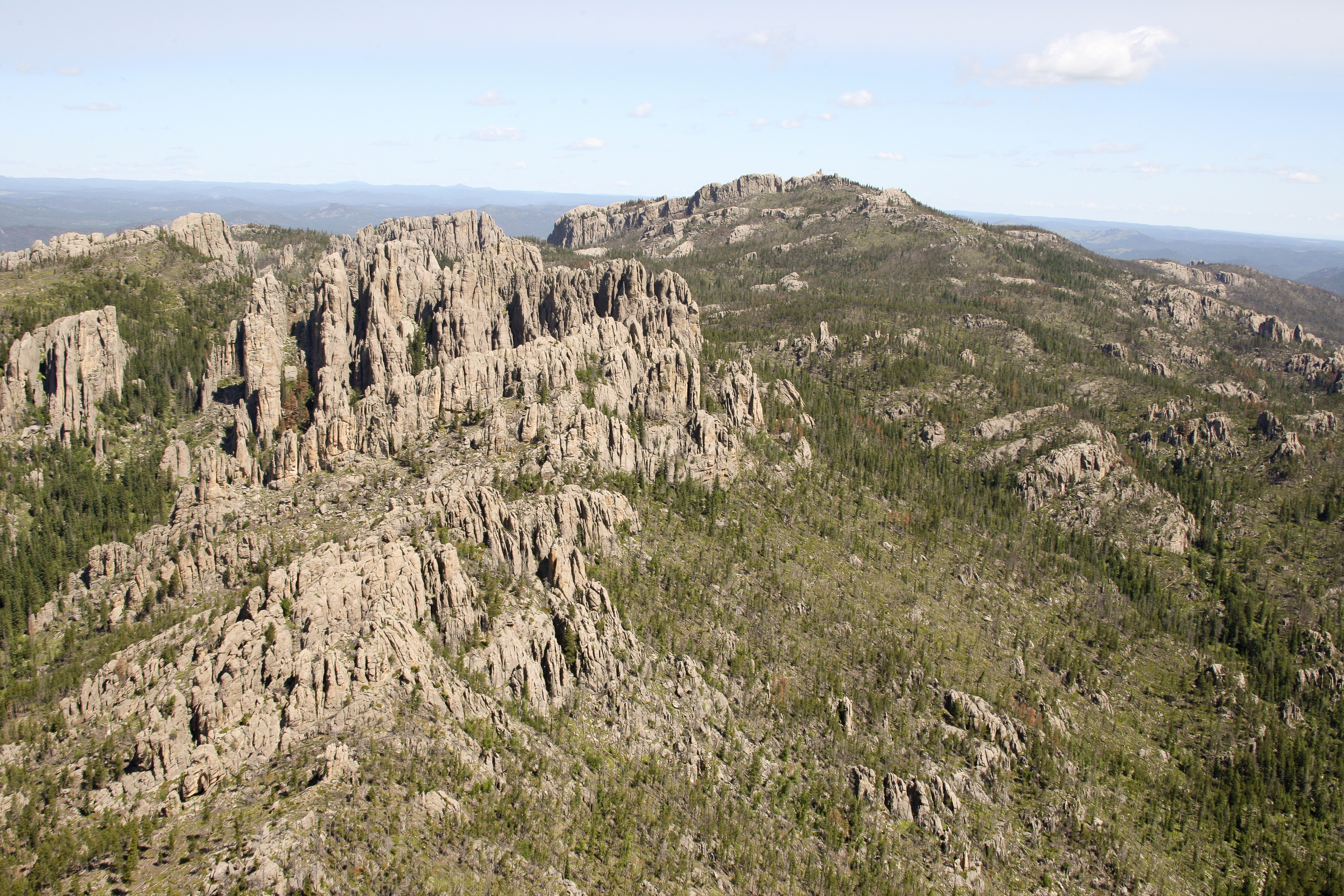
Aerial view of Black Elk Peak and surrounding area

== See also ==
- List of U.S. states by elevation
- List of mountains in South Dakota
