= Nadel =

Nadel may refer to:

- Nadel (surname)
- Needle (disambiguation) (Nadel in German)
- Nadil, Azerbaijan

== See also ==
- Nadal (surname)
