= The Needles (disambiguation) =

The Needles is a formation off the westernmost point of the Isle of Wight in the United Kingdom.

The Needles or Needles may also refer to:

== Places ==
=== United States ===
- The Needles (Arizona), a group of mountain peaks in the Mohave Mountains of Arizona
  - Needles, California, a city named after the peaks
- The Needles (Sequoia National Forest), a series of massive granite rock formations in California
- Needles (Black Hills), granite pillars in South Dakota
- The Needles district, the southeast section of Canyonlands National Park, Utah
  - The Needles, a rocky area within Canyonlands National Park, Utah
- The Needles (Olympic Mountains), summits in Olympic National Park of Washington state
- The Needles (Washington), a mountain in the North Cascades range of Washington state

=== Elsewhere ===
- Needles, Tasmania, a locality in Australia
- Needles, British Columbia, Canada, an unincorporated area

== Songs ==
- "Needles", by Adema on the album Unstable
- "Needles", by System of a Down on the album Toxicity
- "Needles", by Seether on the albums Disclaimer and Disclaimer II

== Other uses ==
- Needles (surname)
- The Needles (band), a Scottish four-piece band originating in the late 1990s
- Needles (horse) (1953–1984), American Hall of Fame Champion Thoroughbred racehorse
- Needles (Amtrak station), a train station in Needles, California, United States
- Needles Ferry, a ferry between Needles and Fauquier, British Columbia, Canada
- The Needles, nickname for Project West Ford, a 1960s American military operation which put a series of communication dipoles in space
- Needles, a Back to the Future character

== See also ==
- Needle (disambiguation)
