= List of lakes of Ontario: N =

This is a list of lakes of Ontario beginning with the letter N.

== Nab–Nan ==
- Nabakwasi Lake
- Nabemakoseka Lake
- Nabigon Lake
- Nabimina Lake
- Nabish Lake
- Nabob Lake
- Nackawic Lake
- Nadawe Lake
- Nadeau Lake
- Nadine Lake
- Nadjiwan Lake
- Nadon Lake (Nipissing District)
- Nadon Lake (Thunder Bay District)
- Nadon Lake (Kenora District)
- Nagagami Lake
- Nagagamisis Lake
- Nagasin Lake
- Nagunagisic Lake
- Nahany Lake
- Nahma Lake
- Nahnun Lake
- Nahokeesio Lake
- Nailhead Lake
- Naiscoot Lake
- Nak Lake
- Nalla Lake
- Namakan Lake
- Namakootchie Lake
- Namasang Lake
- Namaybin Lake
- Namaygoos Lake
- Namea Lake
- Namego Lake
- Nameiben Lake
- Nameibin Lake
- Nameigos Lake
- Nameigosis Lake
- Nameless Lake (Sudbury District)
- Nameless Lake (Manitoulin District)
- Namiwan Lakes
- Nan Lake
- Nancy Lake
- Nancy's Lake
- Nangle Lake
- Nango Lake
- Nankika Lake
- Nanos Lake
- Nansen Lake

== Nap–Naz ==
- Napanee Lake (Kenora District)
- Napanee Lake (Frontenac County)
- Napier Lake (Kenora District)
- Napier Lake (Sudbury District)
- Napier Lake (Lanark County)
- Napken Lake
- Napper Lake
- Naraka Lake
- Narraway Lake
- Narrow Lake (Algoma District)
- Narrow Lake (Rowell Township, Kenora District)
- Narrow Lake (Timiskaming District)
- Narrow Lake (Skinner Township, Kenora District)
- Narrow Lake (Muskoka District)
- Narrow Lake (Rainy River District)
- Narrowbag Lake
- Narrows Lake (Thunder Bay District)
- Narrows Lake (Kenora District)
- Narrows Lake (Cochrane District)
- Narrows Lake (Sudbury District)
- Narvik Lake
- Nasen Lake
- Nash Lake (Chemahagan River, Cochrane District)
- Nash Lake (Kenora District)
- Nash Lake (Ruisseau Kacockwabikagwi, Cochrane District)
- Nass Lake
- Nassau Lake
- Natal Lake
- Nates Lake
- Nathalie Lake
- Natogami Lake
- Nature Lake
- Nault Lake (Cochrane District)
- Nault Lake (Thunder Bay District)
- Nausikaa Lake
- Navimar Lake
- Navy Lake
- Nawahe Lake
- Naydo Lake
- Naylor Lake
- Nazar Lake

== Nea–Nek ==
- Neal Lake (Frontenac County)
- Neal Lake (Kenora District)
- Nearline Lake
- Neath Lake
- Neault Lake
- Neawagank Lake
- Neba Lake
- Nebanawbaig Lake
- Nebula Lake
- Nechigona Lake
- Neck Lake
- Necklace Lake
- Ned Lake
- Neds Pond
- Need Lake
- Needle Lake (Upper Ross Lake, Thunder Bay District)
- Needle Lake (Canyon River, Kenora District)
- Needle Lake (Needle Creek, Thunder Bay District)
- Needle Lake (Webb Township, Kenora District)
- Needle Lake (Algoma District)
- Needler Lake
- Neegeek Lake
- Neelands Lake
- Neely Lake
- Neewin Lake
- Nega Lake
- Neganoban Lake
- Negeek Lake
- Negick Lake
- Negobau Lake
- Negro Lakes
- Negwazu Lake
- Nehemiah Lake
- Neil Lake (Thunder Bay District)
- Neil Lake (Hastings County)
- Neilly Lake (Algoma District)
- Neilly Lake (Sudbury District)
- Neilson Lake (Kenora District)
- Neilson Lake (Muskoka District)
- Nekence Lake
- Nekik Lake

== Nel–Nes ==
- Nellem Lake
- Nellie Lake (Cochrane District)
- Nellie Lake (Sudbury District)
- Nellie Lake (Thunder Bay District)
- Nelly Lake
- Nelson Lake (Sudbury District)
- Nelson Lake (Thunder Bay District)
- Nelson Lake (Parry Sound District)
- Nelson Lake (Cedar Lake, Kenora District)
- Nelson Lake (Timiskaming District)
- Nelson Lake (Muskoka District)
- Nelson Lake (Gidley Township, Kenora District)
- Nelson Lakes
- Nem Lake
- Nemag Lake
- Nemakwis Lake
- Nemategun Lake
- Nemebina Lake
- Nemegos Lake
- Nemegosenda Lake
- Nemeibenikan Lake
- Nemeibennuk Lake
- Nemeigusabins Lake
- Nemi Lake
- Nemiman Lake
- Nemo Lake
- Nenemousha Lake
- Neomi Lake
- Neotoma Lake
- Nepahwin Lake
- Nepawin Lake
- Nepeta Lake
- Nepewassi Lake
- Nephic Lake
- Nerandeau Lake
- Nervine Lake
- Nesbitt Lake (Algoma District)
- Nesbitt Lake (Kenora District)
- Neshin Lake
- Nest Lake (Sudbury District)
- Nest Lake (Rainy River District)
- Nesting Lake
- Neston Lake
- Nestor Lake

== Net–Nez ==
- Net Lake (Nipissing District)
- Net Lake (Kenora District)
- Nettie Lake
- Nettleton Lake (Cochrane District)
- Nettleton Lake (Algoma District)
- Netun Lake
- Neumann Lake
- Neumans Lake (Bonnechere Valley)
- Neumans Lake (Brudenell, Lyndoch and Raglan)
- Neundorf Lake
- Neverfreeze Lake
- Neville Lake (Parry Sound District)
- Neville Lake (Sudbury District)
- Nevison Lake
- New Lake
- Newberry Lake
- Newboro Lake
- Newcombe Lake
- Newell Lake
- Newfeld Lake
- Newlands Lake
- Newlove Lake
- Newman Lake (Rowan Lake, Kenora District)
- Newman Lake (Sioux Narrows-Nestor Falls)
- Newpost Lake
- New Sawmill Lake
- Newstead Lake
- Newt Lake (Rainy River District)
- Newt Lake (Kenora District)
- Newton Lake (Algoma District)
- Newton Lake (Cochrane District)
- Newton Lake (Sudbury District)
- Newton's Pothole
- New Years Lake
- Ney Lake
- Neys Lake
- Nezah Lake
- Nezwa Lake

== Nia–Nig ==
- Lake Niapenco
- Nibinamik Lake
- Nibs Lake
- Niccolite Lake
- Nicho Lake
- Nicholls Lake
- Nichols Lake (Algoma District)
- Nichols Lake (Lanark County)
- Nicholson Lake (Sudbury District)
- Nicholson Lake (Lanark County)
- Nicholson Lake (Thunder Bay District)
- Nick Lake (Sudbury District)
- Nick Lake (Algoma District)
- Nick Lake (Nipissing District)
- Nickel Lake (Rainy River District)
- Nickel Lake (Thunder Bay District)
- Nickel Lake (Sudbury District)
- Nickels Lake
- Nickila Lake
- Nickle Lake
- Nickleby Lake
- Nicol Lake
- Nicolson Lake
- Nid Lake
- Nie Lake
- Niemi Lake
- Niepage Lake
- Nifty Lake
- Niger Lake
- Night Lake
- Nightfall Lake
- Night Hawk Lake
- Nightjar Lake
- Nigick Lake
- Nigig Lake
- Nigras Lakes

== Nik–Nix ==
- Nikip Lake
- Nikitowa Lake
- Nimitz Lake
- Nina Lake
- Nine Lake
- Nineay Lake
- Ninegee Lake
- Nine Mile Lake (Parry Sound District)
- Nine Mile Lake (Muskoka District)
- Nine Mile Lake (Kenora District)
- Nineteen Lake (Muskoka District)
- Nineteen Lake (Manitoulin District)
- Ningik Lakes
- Ningoowaswi Lake
- Ninth Lake
- Niobe Lake
- Nipa Lake
- Lake Nipigon
- Nipin Lake
- Lake Nipissing
- Nisbet Lake
- Nishin Lake
- Niska Lake (Cochrane District)
- Niska Lake (Kenora District)
- Niskibi Lake
- Nissiamkikam Lake
- Nitro Lake
- Nittam Lake
- Niven Lake (Cochrane District)
- Niven Lake (Rainy River District)
- Nixon Lake (Thunder Bay District)
- Nixon Lake (Kenora District)
- Nixon Lake (Cochrane District)

== Noa–Noo ==
- Noakes Lake
- Nobbs Lake
- Noble Lake (Thunder Bay District)
- Noble Lake (Kenora District)
- Noble Lake (Nipissing District)
- Nod Lake (Algoma District)
- Nod Lake (Nipissing District)
- Noel Lake
- Noel Love Lake
- Nog Lake
- Noganosh Lake
- Nogen Pond
- Noggin Lake
- Nogies Lake
- No Good Lake
- Noisy Lake (Lennox and Addington County)
- Noisy Lake (Algoma District)
- Nokanee Lake
- Nokomis Lake (Sudbury District)
- Nokomis Lake (Nipissing District)
- Nokomis Lake (Timiskaming District)
- Nola Lake
- Nolan Lake (Thunder Bay District)
- Nolan Lake (Kenora District)
- Nomad Lake
- No Man Lake
- No Name Lake (Algoma District)
- No Name Lake (Terrace Bay)
- No Name Lake (Shuniah)
- Noname Lake (Thunder Bay District)
- Noname Lake (Kenora District)
- Nonigose Lake
- Nonwatin Lake
- Nonwatinose Lake
- Nook Lake
- Nool Lake
- Noon Lake (Cochrane District)
- Noon Lake (Rainy River District)
- Noon Lake (Nipissing District)
- Noonan Lake (Renfrew County)
- Noonan Lake (Kenora District)

== Nora–Nors ==
- Nora Lake (Kenora District)
- Nora Lake (Sudbury District)
- Nora Lake (Thunder Bay District)
- Norah Lake
- Norami Lake
- Norbury Lake
- Norcan Lake
- Nordic Lake (Thunder Bay District)
- Nordic Lake (Algoma District)
- Nordland Lake
- Norfolk Lake
- Norham Pond
- Norlock Lake
- Norm Lake
- Norma Lake (Earl Township, Sudbury District)
- Norma Lake (Kenogaming Township, Sudbury District)
- Norma Lake (Thunder Bay District)
- Norman Lake (Renfrew County)
- Norman Lake (Sudbury District)
- Norman Lake (Thunder Bay District)
- Norman Lake (Cochrane District)
- Norman Lake (Nipissing District)
- Norman Lake (Timiskaming District)
- Normandin Lake
- Norm's Lake
- Norn Lake
- Norrington Lake
- Norris Lake (Nipissing District)
- Norris Lake (Cochrane District)
- Norris Lake (Algoma District)
- Norse Lake (Kenora District)
- Norse Lake (Algoma District)
- Norseman Lake

== North–Northe ==
- North Lake (Cochrane District)
- North Lake (Haliburton County)
- North Lake (Hastings County)
- North Lake (Street Township, Sudbury District)
- North Lake (Botha Township, Sudbury District)
- North Lake (Parry Sound District)
- North Lake (Thunder Bay District)
- North Lake (Lennox and Addington County)
- North Arabi Lake
- North Bamaji Lake
- North Barlow Lake
- North Bearcub Lake
- North Beaver Lake (Haliburton County)
- North Beaver Lake (Timiskaming District)
- North Bedivere Lake
- North Bladder Lake
- North Boundary Lake
- North Branch Lake
- North Brennan Lake
- North Buck Lake
- North Burntbush Lake
- North Byng Lake
- North Caribou Lake
- North Chabbie Lake
- North Chainy Lake
- North Chubb Lake
- North Cleaver Lake
- North Clyde Lake
- North Cook Lake
- North Coonie Lake
- Northcott Bay
- North Crocker's Lake
- North Cuckoo Lake
- North Depot Lake
- North Dishnish Lake
- North Dotty Lake
- Northeast Lake (Greater Sudbury)
- Northeast Lake (Caen Township, Sudbury District)
- Northeast Lake (Hess Township, Sudbury District)
- Northeast Lake (Lennox and Addington County)
- Northeast Twin Lake
- North Eels Lake
- North Embarass Lake
- North Emerson Lake
- Northern Light Lake
- Northern Pike Lake

== North F–North O ==
- North Finnegan Lake
- North Floodwood Lake
- North Foley Lake
- North Fowl Lake
- North Galipo Lake
- North Gamble Lake
- North Grace Lake
- North Granite Lake
- North Havelock Lake
- North Healey Lake
- North Helen Lake
- North Hodgins Lake
- North Hubert Lake
- North Kettle Lake
- North Kirby Lake
- North Lamaune Lake
- Northland Lake
- North Lauri Lake
- North Lemon Lake
- Northline Lake
- North Longford Lake
- North Louise Lake
- North Martin Lake
- North Maskuti Lake
- North Mawn Lake
- North McCrea Lake
- North McKinnon Lake
- North McQuibban Lake
- North Milne Lake
- North Mink Lake
- North Moher Lake
- North Moonbeam Lake
- Northmore Lake (Parry Sound District)
- Northmore Lake (Kenora District)
- North Mud Lake
- North Muldrew Lake
- North Narrow Lake
- North Nigig Lake
- North Nordic Lake
- North Oak Lake
- North Oriole Lake
- North Oskawe Lake
- North Otter Lake (Haliburton County)
- North Otter Lake (Kenora District)
- North Otter Lake (Frontenac County)

== North P–North Y ==
- North Pagwachuan Lake
- North Pencil Lake
- North Pickerel Lake
- North Pigeon Lake
- North Pine Lake
- Northpine Lake
- Northpoint Lake
- North Quinn Lake
- North Rathbun Lake
- North Raven Lake
- North Ridge Lake
- North River Lake
- North Roche Lake
- North Rocker Lake
- North Rouge Lake
- North Scot Lake
- North Silver Lake (Nipissing District)
- North Silver Lake (Sudbury District)
- North Sinclair Lake
- North Skibi Lake
- North Skipper Lake
- North Soldier Lake
- Northspan Lake
- North Spirit Lake
- North Spruce Lake
- North Star Lake
- North Sweeny Lake
- North Sylvia Lake
- North Tea Lake
- North Triple Lake
- North Trout Lake
- North Troutfly Lake
- North Tweed Lake
- North Twin Lake (Timiskaming District)
- North Twin Lake (Rainy River District)
- North Twin Lake (Sudbury District)
- North Twin Lake (Thunder Bay District)
- North Vance Lake
- North Vison Lake
- North Washagami Lake
- North Wejinabikun Lake
- Northwest Lake
- Northwest Mountain Lake
- Northwest Perch Lake
- North Whalen Lake
- North Whitesand Lake
- North Wind Lake
- Northwind Lake (Sudbury District)
- Northwind Lake (Kenora District)
- North Wreck Lake
- North Yorston Lake

== Norto ==
- Norton Lake (Algoma District)
- Norton Lake (Kenora District)

== Norw ==
- Norwalk Lake
- Norway Lake (Lanark County)
- Norway Lake (Redditt Township, Kenora District)
- Norway Lake (Addington Highlands)
- Norway Lake (Scotch River, Kenora District)
- Norway Lake (Manitoulin District)
- Norway Lake (Stone Mills)
- Norway Lake (Sproule Township, Nipissing District)
- Norway Lake (Wyse Township, Nipissing District)
- Norway Lake (North Frontenac)
- Norway Lake (Sudbury District)
- Norway Lake (South Frontenac)
- Norway Lake (Renfrew County)
- Norway Mud Lake
- Norwegian Lake
- Norwest Lake
- Norwood Lake

== Nos–Nox ==
- Nosa Lake
- Lake Nosbonsing
- Noss Lake
- Noswal Lake
- Notagan Lake
- Note Lake
- Noted Lake
- Notley Lake
- Notman Lake (Nipissing District)
- Notman Lake (Kenora District)
- Notround Lake
- Notsobig Lake
- Notsolong Lake
- Nott Lake
- Novick Lake
- Nowashe Lake
- Nowater Lake
- Nowlan Lake (Thunder Bay District)
- Nowlan Lake (Lennox and Addington County)
- Nowquabic Lake
- Nox Lake
- Noxheiatik Lake

== Nu–Ny ==
- Nub Lake
- Nugent Lake
- Null Lake
- Nulla Lake
- Number Four Lake
- Number Nine Lake
- Number One Lake (West Nipissing)
- Number One Lake (Master Township, Nipissing District)
- Number Six Lake
- Number Ten Lake
- Number Three Lake
- Number Two Lake
- Nungesser Lake
- Nunikani Lake
- Nursery Lake
- Nursey Lake
- Nushatogaini Lake
- Nut Lake
- Nuthatch Lake
- Nutt Lake
- Nuttall Lake
- Nybergs Lake
- Nydia Lake
- Nye Lake
- Nyilas Lake
- Nylund Lakes
- Nym Lake
- Nymphea Lake
