= Needle =

Needle or Needles may refer to:

== Crafting ==
- Knitting needle, a tool for knitting, not as sharp as a sewing needle
- Sewing needle, a long slender tool with a pointed tip
- Trussing needle, a long slender tool, sometimes with a flattened point, to tie poultry for cooking
- Upholstery needle, a tool for upholstery, generally thick and curved

== Science and technology ==
=== Botany ===
- Needle (botany), of conifers

=== Medicine ===
- Acupuncture needle, in alternative medicine
- Hypodermic needle, a hollow needle commonly used with a syringe to inject fluid into or extract fluid from the body
- Surgical needle, several types of needles used for surgical suture
- Tuohy needle, a needle used to administer epidural catheters

=== Technology ===
- Gramophone needle, used for playing records
- Indicator needle, of a measuring instrument
- Needle valve

== People ==
- Dave Needle (1947–2016), American engineer
- Sharon Needles (born 1981), American drag queen

== Places ==
- Needle Rocks, Tasmania, Australia
- Needle Island, McDonald Islands, Australia
- The Needles, a rock formation on the western tip of the Isle of Wight
- The Needle, Orkney, a sea stack on the island of Hoy, Orkney, Scotland
- Needle Mountains, Colorado, United States
- Needles (Black Hills), a region of granite pillars in South Dakota, United States
- Needles, California, United States
- L'Aiguille ("the Needle"), part of a chalk formation in Étretat, France

== Arts and entertainment ==
=== Film ===
- Needle (1990 film), a television film by Jimmy McGovern
- Needle (2010 film), a supernatural horror film
- The Needle (1988 film), a Soviet film starring Viktor Tsoi

=== Music ===
- Needle (band), an American industrial rock band
- "Needle" (song), by Nicki Minaj featuring Drake
- "Needle", a song on the album All for One by The Screaming Jets
- "Needle", a song on the album Birthmarks by Born Ruffians

=== Other arts and entertainment ===
- Needle (novel), by Hal Clement
- Needle (comics), a Marvel Comics character
- Needle (module), a 1987 Dungeons & Dragons module

== Other uses ==
- Baiting needle, used in angling
- USS Needle (SP-649), a United States Navy patrol boat in commission from 1917 to 1919
- Needle, a cheerleading stunt

== See also ==
- The Needles (disambiguation)
- Space Needle (disambiguation)
- Needle gun (disambiguation)
- Needlefish (disambiguation)
- Needler (disambiguation)
