= Needler =

Needler may refer to:

== In general ==
- Needler (surname), an English surname
- Needlegun or needler, a type of firearm

== Places ==
- Needler Hall, a hall of residence of the University of Hull; in Hull, England, UK
- Needler Lake, Ontario, Canada; a lake, see List of lakes of Ontario: N

== Arts and entertainment ==
- Needler, a type of raygun first appearing in 1934
- Needler, a fictional weapon used by the Covenant in the Halo franchise
- "Needler", a 1957 story by Randall Garrett; see List of media featuring space marines

== Other uses ==
- Needler's, an English confectionery company and brand
- Alfred Needler class fisheries ship (aka "Needler"-class)
- CCGS Alfred Needler (aka: CCGS Needler), a Canadian Coast Guard fisheries science vessel
- Hilary Needler Trophy (aka Needler Trophy), British horseracing trophy

== See also ==
- Needle (disambiguation)
- Needle gun (disambiguation)
