= Needler (surname) =

Needler is a surname. Notable people with the surname include:

- Alfred Needler (1906–1998), Canadian scientist and diplomat
- Christopher Needler (1944–2022), British businessman
- Harold Needler (1910–1975), British businessman
- Henry Needler (1685–1760), British musician
- Winifred Needler (1904–1987), Canadian Egyptologist
