= Nadel (surname) =

Nadel, which means needle in German, is a surname that may refer to:

- Adam Nadel, New York City-based photographer
- Arthur Nadel (born 1932), hedge fund manager accused of $350 million fraud
- Barbara Nadel, an English crime-writer and previous winner of the CWA Silver Dagger
- Eric Nadel (born 1951), sports announcer on radio broadcasts for the Texas Rangers baseball organization
- Gedaliah Nadel (1923–2004), one of the heads of Kollel Chazon Ish and the leading decider of Jewish Law in the Chazon Ish neighborhood of Bene Barak
- Ira Nadel (born 1943), American-Canadian biographer, literary critic and James Joyce scholar
- Jack Nadel, author, entrepreneur and proponent of ethics in business
- Jennifer Nadel, British barrister, journalist and activist.
- Lynn Nadel (born 1942), Regents' Professor of Psychology at the University of Arizona
- Nancy Nadel, U.S. politician
- Nicole Nadel (born 2000), Israeli tennis player
- Siegfried Frederick Nadel (1903–1956), an Austrian-born British anthropologist, specialising in African ethnology
- Larry Nadle, comic book editor sometimes credited as "Larry Nadel"

== See also ==
- Nadal (disambiguation)
- Needle
