= Paul Bradt =

Mountaineering pioneer (1904–1978)

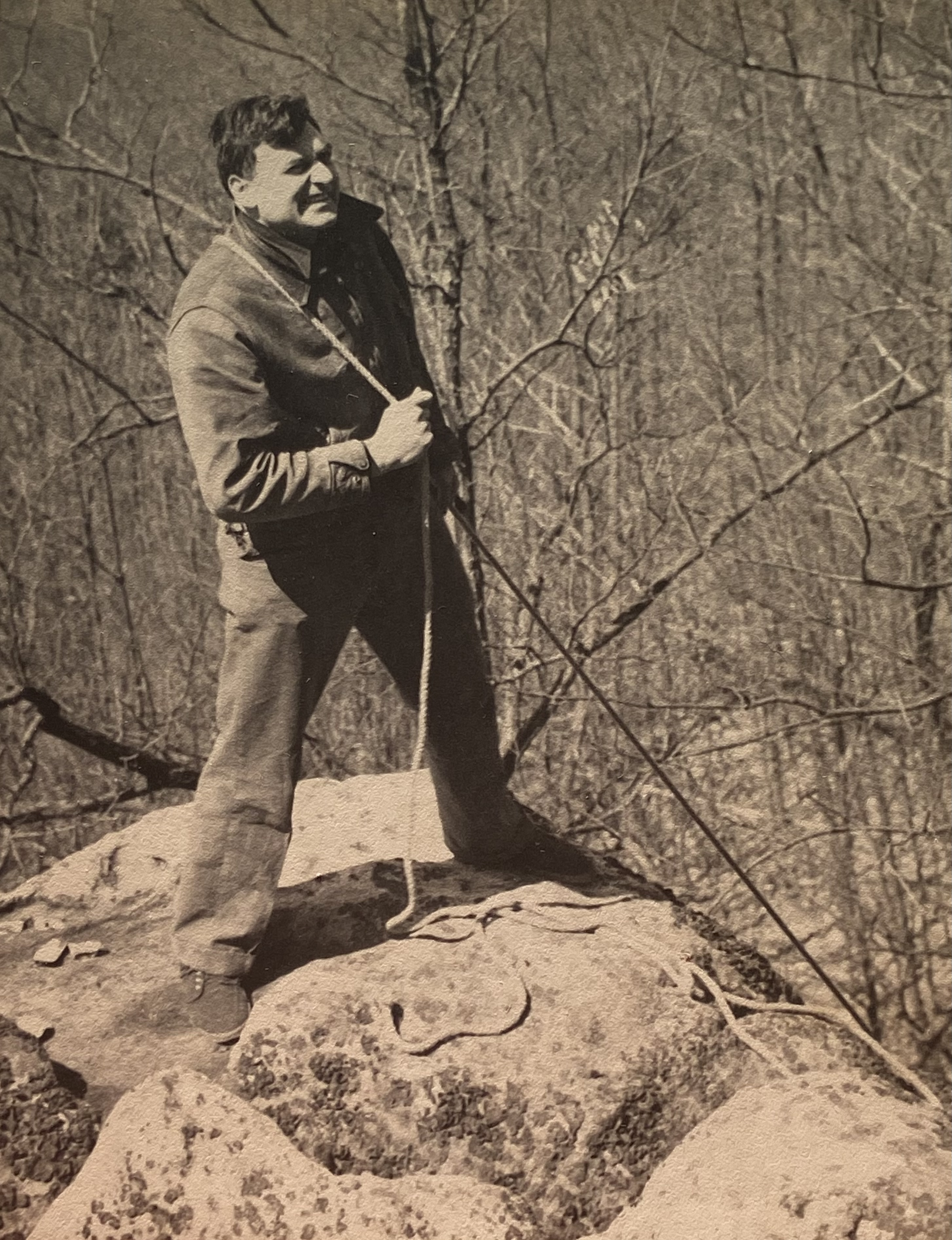
- Born: October 21, 1904; Portland, Indiana
- Died: April 5, 1978 (aged 73); Versailles, Indiana
- Education: Indiana University and George Washington University
- Occupation: Rock Climber

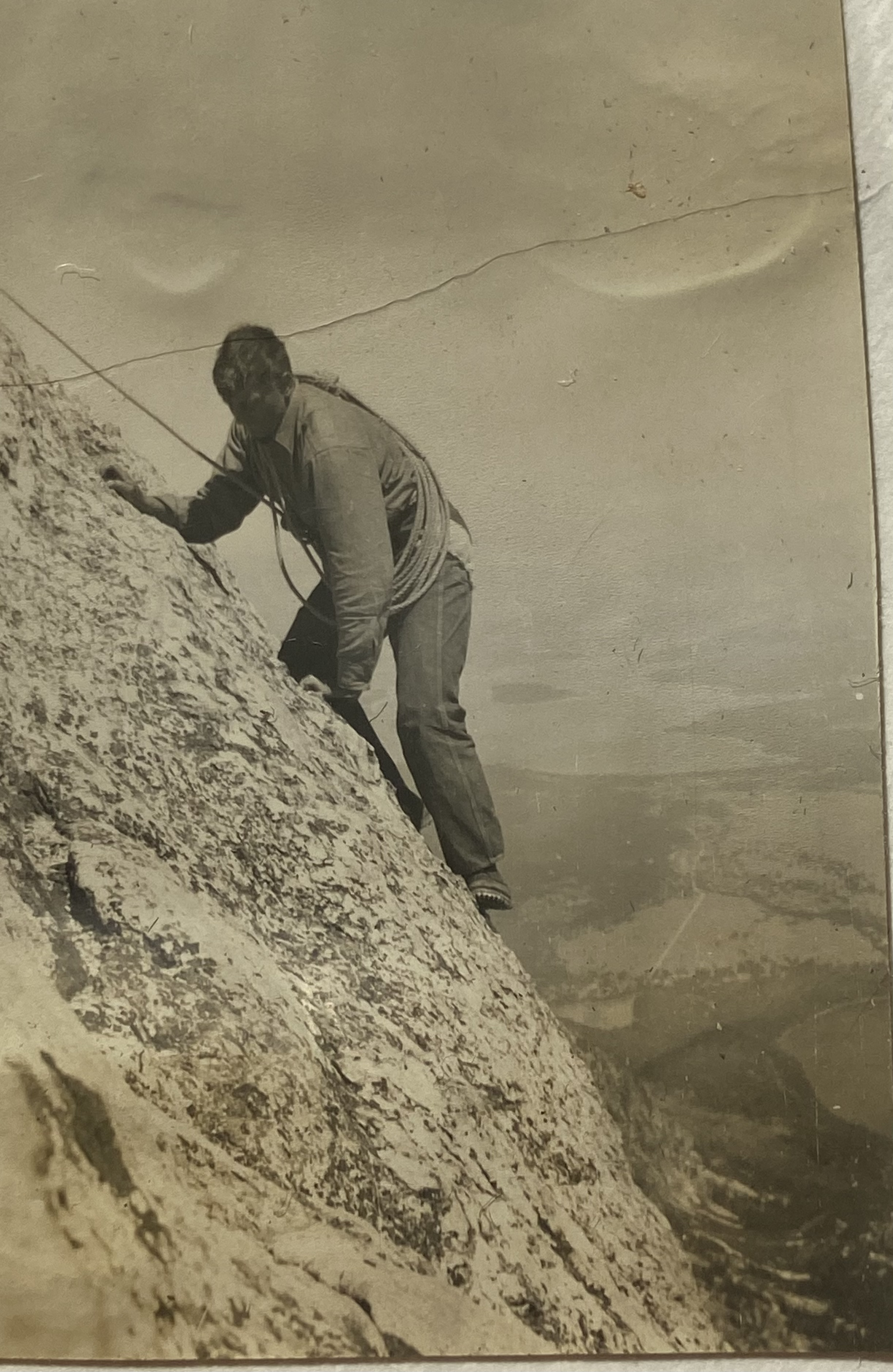
Paul Bradt mid-climb

Paul Jay Bradt (1904–1978) has been called the father of rock climbing in the Washington, D.C., area. He was instrumental in developing interest in the sport, was a founding member and first chair of the rock climbing branch of the Potomac Appalachian Trail Club, and pioneered historic climbs and cave explorations in the 1930s and 1940s. Bradt was introduced to rock climbing by Gustave Gambs (1868–1958) who had learned the sport in Europe. He soon became an active proponent of rock climbing, introducing many people to the sport, some of whom became leaders in the field, such as Don Hubbard, Arnold Wexler, and Herb and Jan Conn. Bradt and his colleagues explored and developed early climbing routes at Great Falls, VA, Carderock, MD, Seneca Rocks, WV, Old Rag Mountain in Shenandoah National Park, VA, and in the Teton Range.

== Early life and education ==
Bradt was born in Portland, Indiana, on October 21, 1904, grew up on a farm in Versailles, Indiana, and as a teenager and student, lived in Bloomington, Indiana, where his father taught in the high school. He earned a bachelor's degree in physics (1927) at Indiana University and a master's degree in mathematics (1931) at George Washington University in Washington, D.C. During his long residence in Washington, he first worked as an examiner at the U.S. Patent Office and then had a long career as a physicist at the National Bureau of Standards. He recruited climbers from among his fellow workers at the Bureau.

Bradt married Josephine Irey (1908–1975) of Washington, D.C., in 1942. They had two sons, Alan and Peter. He was a quiet, self-effacing person who set a standard of encouraging beginning climbers and who embraced a safety-first mentality that persists to this day in the Washington climbing community.

== Seneca Rocks ==
At Seneca Rocks, Bradt made the first documented roped descent – the ascent was a steep hike – of the North Peak with Florence Perry in 1935 and the first documented ascent of the South Peak (east face) with Hubbard and Sam Moore in 1939. The latter was a heroic two-day effort via the routes now known as Lower Skyline Direct, Skyline Traverse, Cockscomb Chimney, and Windy Corner. The same team also made the first documented ascent in 1940 of the precariously perched narrow pinnacle at Seneca Rocks known as the Gendarme.

== Caving ==
Bradt and his climbing partners also brought rock-climbing techniques to cave exploration. Over several years they defined routes and mapped the passages and rooms of Schoolhouse and Hellhole caves in West Virginia, the former beginning about 1938, and the latter beginning with a famous New Year's weekend exploration with Tom Culverwell, Don Hubbard, Sam Moore and Bill Schlecht. They left the following sign at the cave entrance to forestall an unneeded rescue effort: “Notice, Saturday, December 31st, 1939. Five men in Hellhole. Will come out about noon, Sunday January 1, 1940,” and listed the names.

== Potomac Appalachian Mountain Club ==
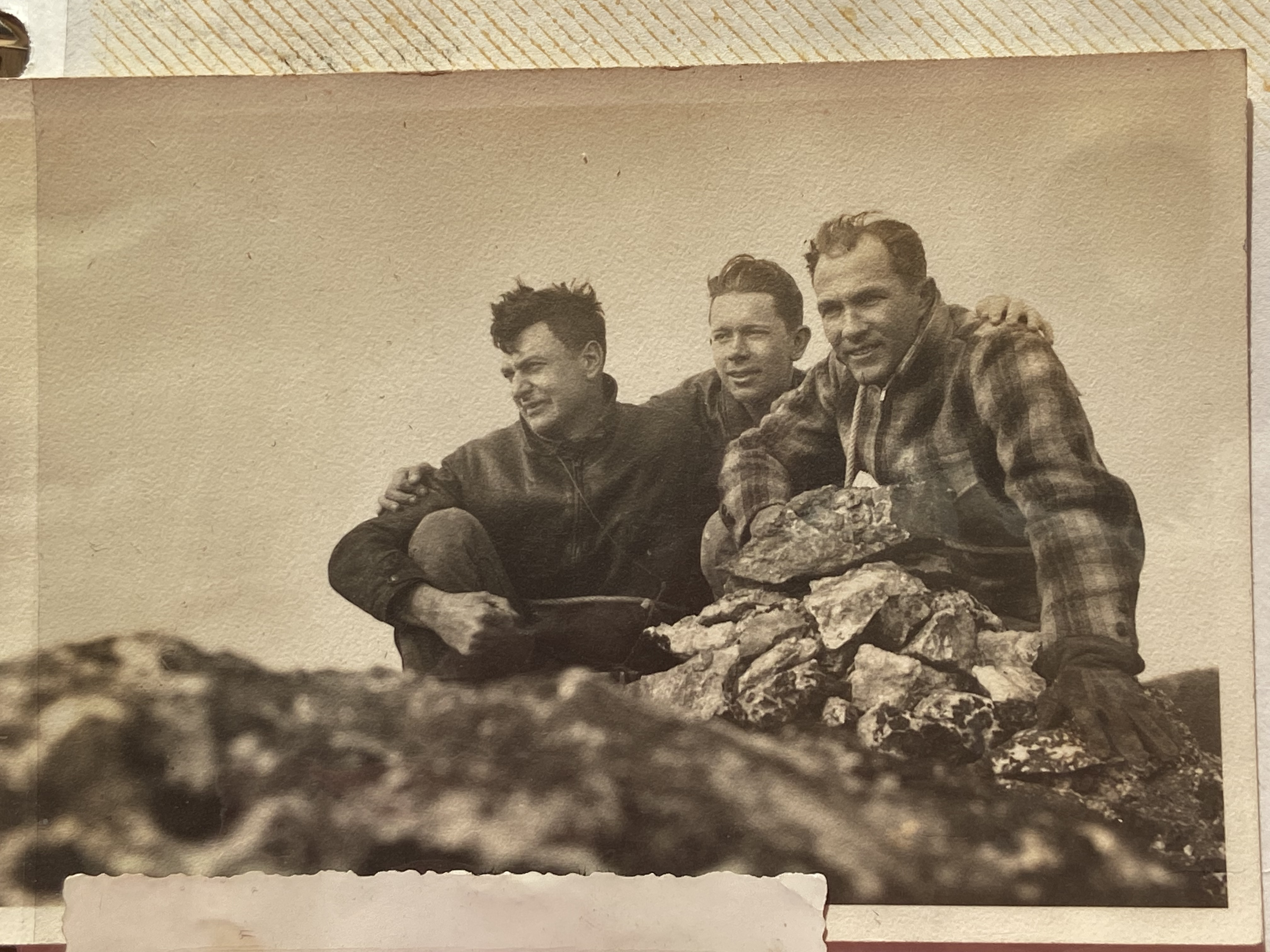
Paul Bradt (left)

Bradt was the primary force behind the founding of the Rock Climbing Section of the Potomac Appalachian Trail Club in about 1937; it survives today as the Mountaineering Section, also known as the Potomac Mountain Club. Bradt served as its chair through 1942. Bradt and his wife, Josephine Irey Bradt, edited the Section Newsletter “Up Rope” from 1945 to 1947. During the 1940–41 school year, Bradt organized a weekly rock-climbing course that included caving techniques at George Washington University. It entailed 12 class sessions and 12 field trips.

== First ascent in the Grand Tetons ==
On August 4, 1944, Bradt and Sterling Hendricks completed the first ascent of the Glacier Route on Middle Teton in Wyoming. This route is described as a "classic," and is one of the few early-season, purely ice-and-snow routes in the Grand Tetons.

== Later life ==
He retired to a log home he built with his sons on a wooded hillside outside Luray, Virginia. He died on April 5, 1978, while visiting his sister at the Indiana farm on which he had been raised.
