= Nungesser =

Nungesser may refer to:

== People ==
- Charles Nungesser, French pilot
- Billy Nungesser, Lieutenant Governor of Louisiana since 2016
- William "Billy" Nungesser, Louisiana Republican politician, father of Billy Nungesser

== Places ==
- Nungessers in northeastern New Jersey
- Nungesser Lake in Ontario, Canada
