= Needles (surname) =

Needles is a surname. Notable people with the surname include:

== Birth names ==
- Arthur C. Needles (1867–1936), President of the Norfolk and Western Railway
- Belverd Needles (fl. 1970s–2020s), American economist and professor at DePaul University
- Dan Needles, Canadian 20th-21st century playwright
- Ira Needles (1893–1986), second chancellor of the University of Waterloo in Canada
- Jimmy Needles (1900–1969), American basketball coach
- John Needles (1786–1878), active Quaker and noted Maryland abolitionist
- Thomas B. Needles (1835–1914), American politician and businessman
- William Needles (1919–2016), American-born Canadian actor and teacher

== Stage names ==
- Nique Needles (fl. 1980s–2020s), stage name of Cornelius Delaney, Australian artist, musician, and actor
- Sharon Needles (born 1981), stage name of Aaron Coady, an American drag performer and recording artist
