= Needle gun (disambiguation) =

A needle gun is a rifle that has a needle-like firing pin.

Needle gun or needlegun may also refer to:

- Needlegun, a firearm that fires small, sometimes fin-stabilized, metal darts or flechetes
- Needlegun scaler, a hydraulic or pneumatic tool used to remove rust, mill scale, and old paint from metal surfaces
- "Needle Gun", a song by Hawkwind from their 1985 album The Chronicle of the Black Sword
- "Needle-Gun", a song by Ciccone Youth from their 1988 album The Whitey Album
- Needler, a fictional weapon used by the Covenant in the Halo franchise

== See also ==
- Dart gun (disambiguation)
- Needle (disambiguation)
- Needler (disambiguation)
