= Mule Ear Peaks =

Mountain in Texas, United States

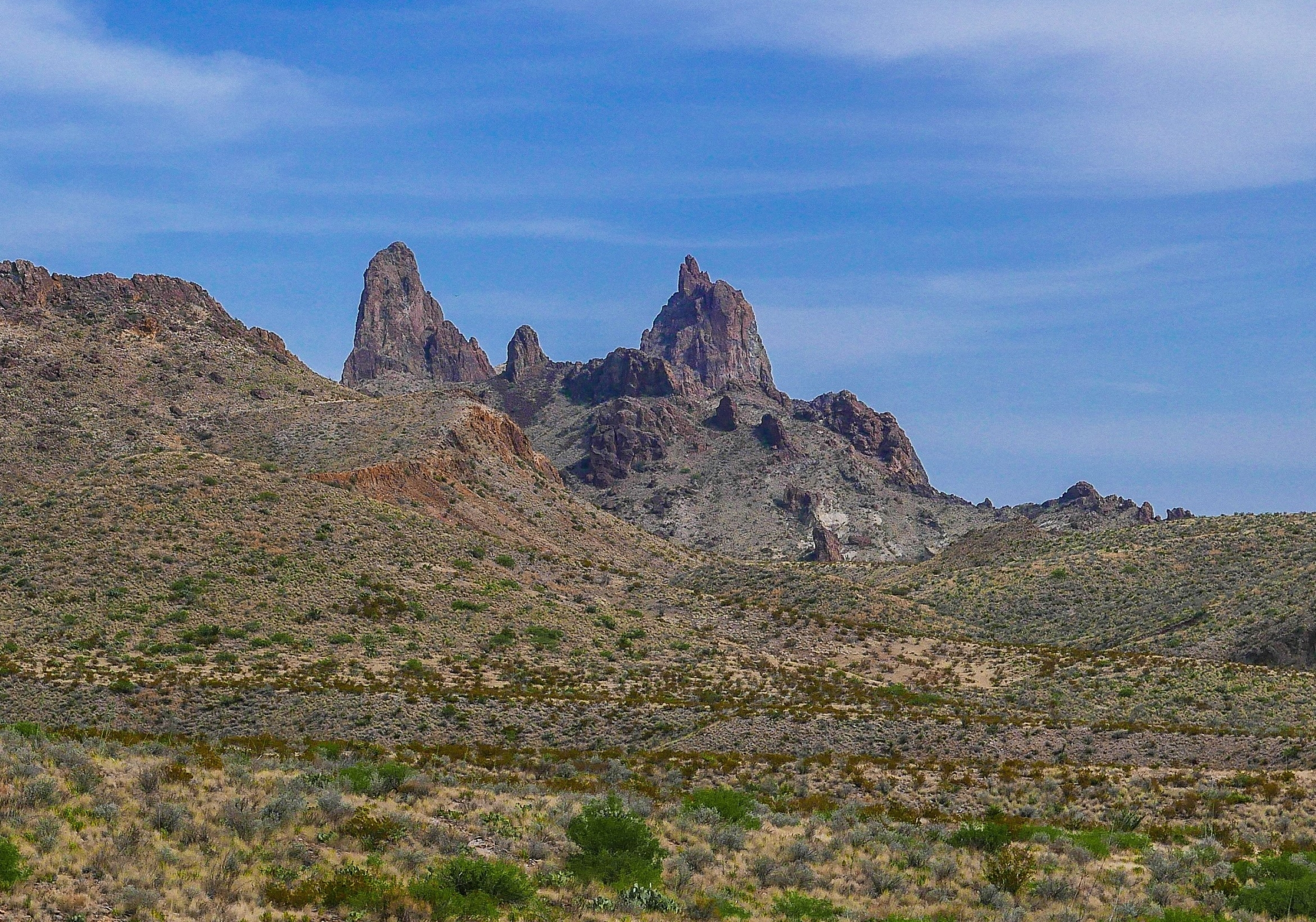
- Northwest aspect

Highest point
- Elevation: 3,897 ft (1,188 m)
- Prominence: 765 ft (233 m)
- Isolation: 1.93 mi (3.11 km)
- Coordinates: 29°08′37″N 103°24′08″W

Geography
- Location within Texas Location within the United States
- Country: United States
- State: Texas
- County: Brewster
- Protected area: Big Bend National Park
- Parent range: Chisos Mountains
- Topo map: USGS Cerro Castellan

Geology
- Rock age: Oligocene
- Rock type: Igneous rock (Rhyolite)

Climbing
- First ascent: Jan and Herb Conn (1940s)
- Easiest route: class 5.x climbing

Mule Ear Peaks are two summits in Brewster County, Texas, United States.

== Description ==
Mule Ear Peaks is part of the Chisos Mountains and is set in the Chihuahuan Desert where it is an iconic landmark in Big Bend National Park. The south peak reaches 3,897 feet in elevation (1,188 meters) and the north peak is 3,882 feet (1,183 m). The landform is a dike composed of rhyolite (volcanic rock) which formed 29 million years ago during the Oligocene period, specifically the Burro Mesa Rhyolite member of the Burro Mesa Formation. Below the spires are Mule Ear Spring Tuff and Bee Mountain Basalt. Based on the Köppen climate classification, the peaks are located in a hot arid climate zone with hot summers and mild winters. Any scant precipitation runoff from the peak's slopes drains into Smoky Creek which empties into the Rio Grande six miles to the south-southwest. Topographic relief is significant as the summit rises 1,080 feet (329 m) above Smoky Creek in 0.35 mile (0.56 km). The mountain's descriptive toponym has been officially adopted by the United States Board on Geographic Names, and has been featured in publications since at least 1907. In the 1930s, part of Army Air Corps flight training included flying between these two spires. Col. Charles Deerwester claimed to be the first pilot to "thread the needle" by flying between the two peaks. The first ascent of the summit was made in the 1940s by Jan and Herb Conn.

== See also ==
- List of mountain peaks of Texas
- Geography of Texas

== Gallery ==
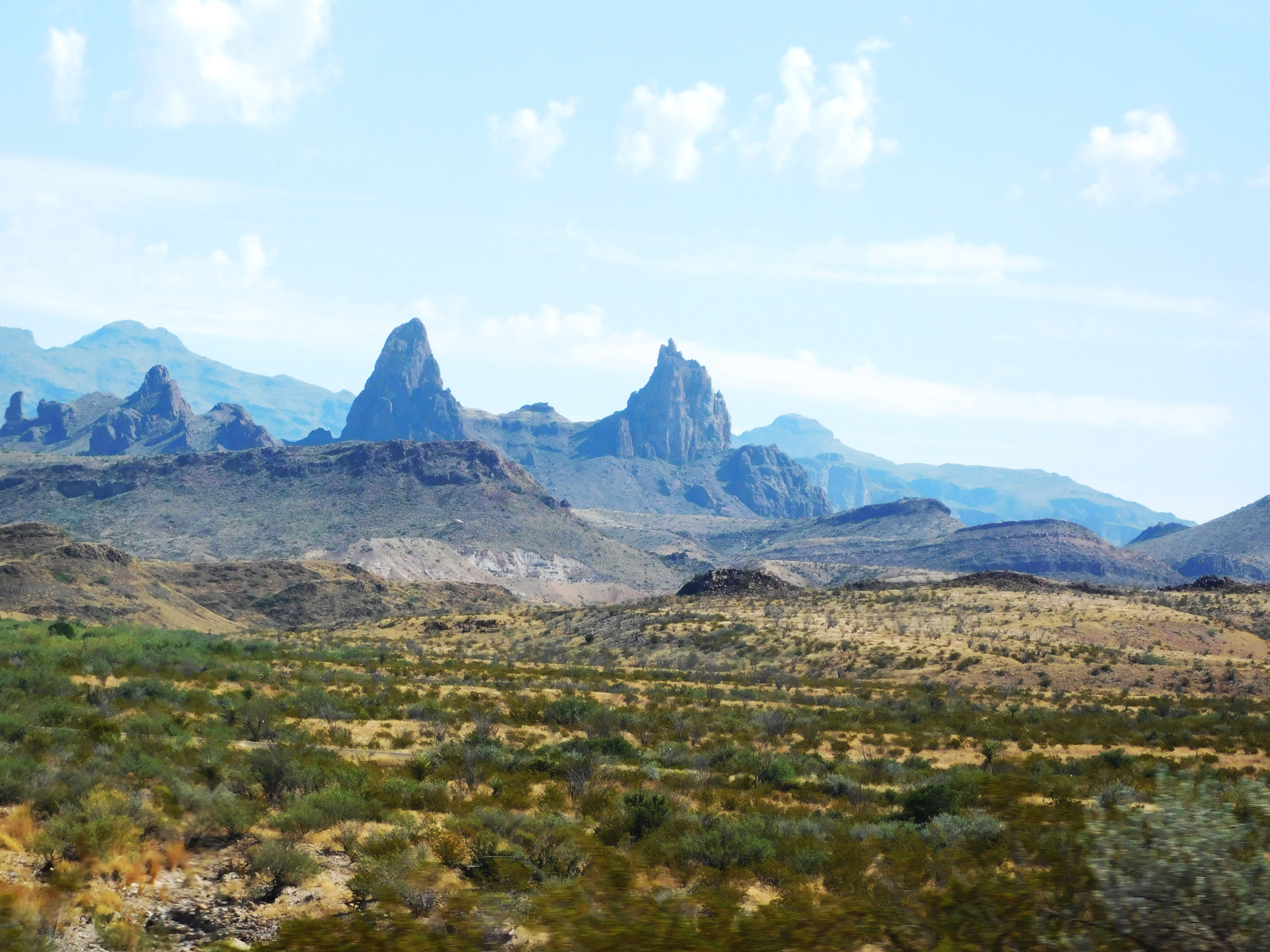
Mule Ear Peaks from west

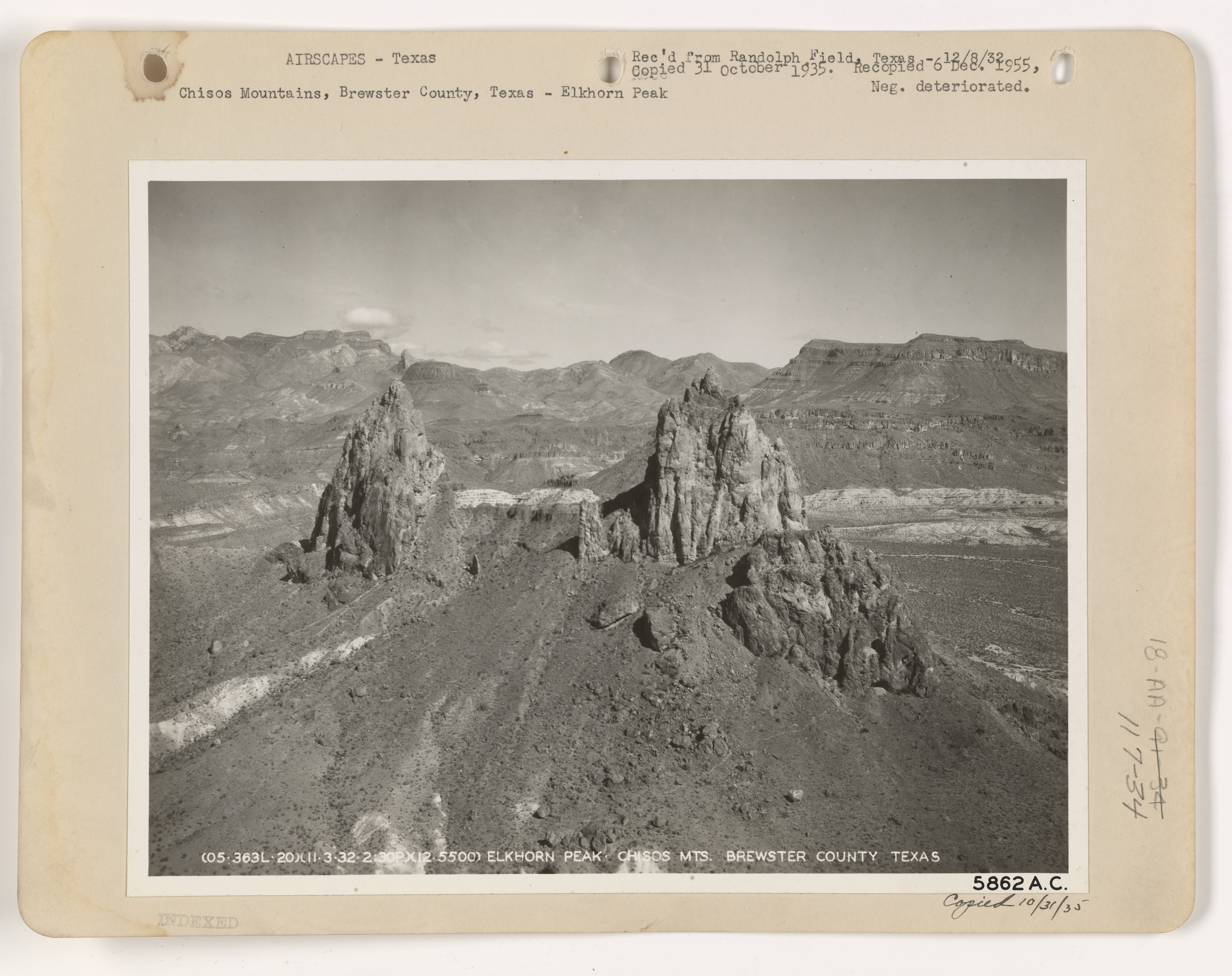
Aerial view, southwest aspect, 1932
