= Carderock Recreation Area =

Park in Carderock, Maryland, US

Carderock
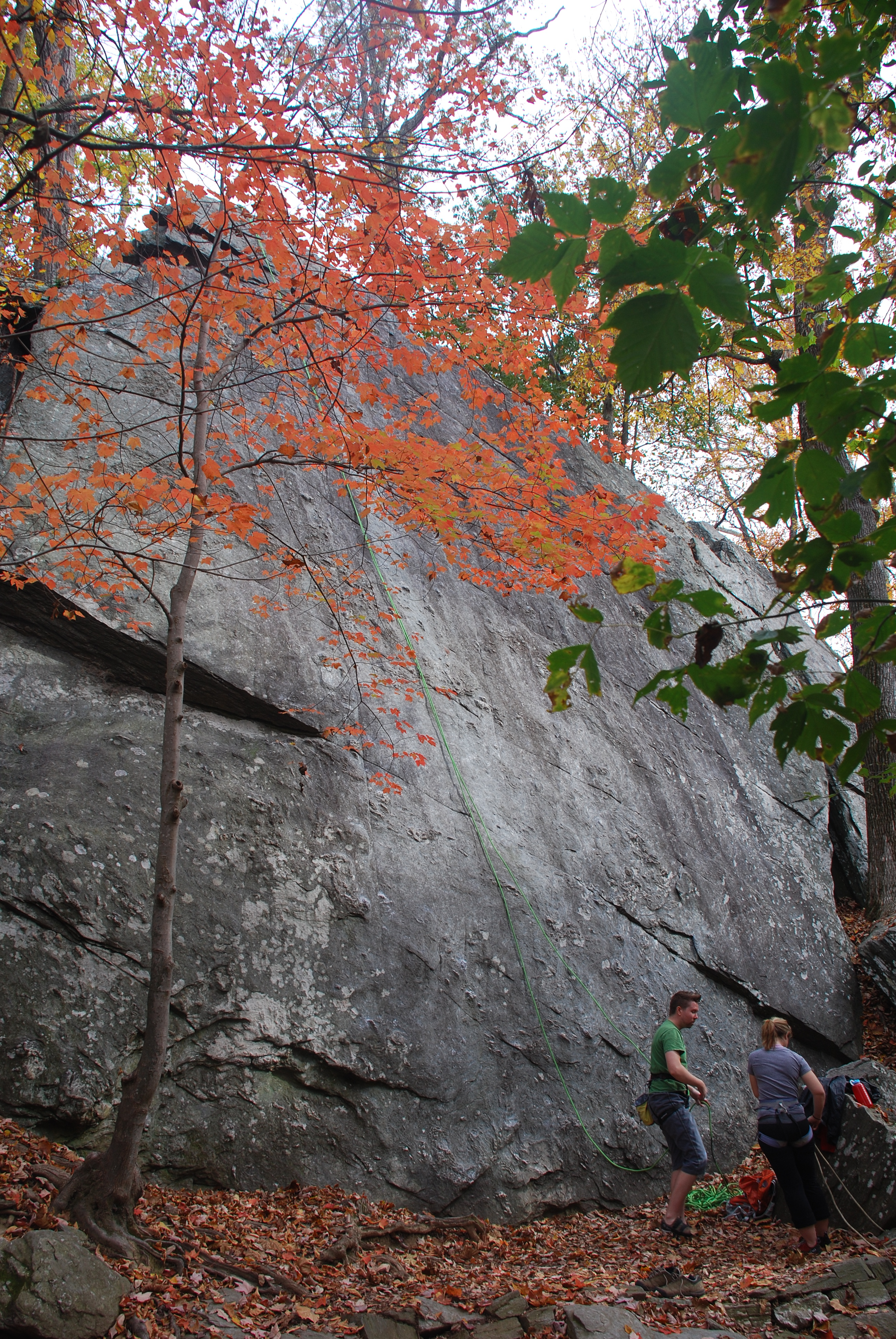

- Location within Maryland
- Location: Montgomery County, Maryland
- Nearest city: Bethesda, Maryland
- Coordinates: 38°58′34.61″N 77°12′19.01″W
- Type of climbing: top-rope crag, bouldering
- Height range: 50 feet
- Pitches range: 1
- Technical grades: 5.0-5.12 with majority of climbs in 5.6-5.10 range
- NCCS grades: I
- Rock type: Wissahikon Mica-schist with quartz crystals
- Quantity of routes: days worth (over 150 climbs and boulder problems)
- Climbing area developed: very well developed
- Cliff aspect: South west facing
- Season: spring to fall
- Ownership: National Park Service
- Camping: none
- Classic climbs: Beginners Crack (5.3); Jan's Face (5.6-5-11); Elsie's Other (5.7); Sterling's Crack (5.7); Flutterby (5.8+); Butterfly (5.9-); Herbie's Horror (5.9); Cripple's Face (5.9); The Dream (5.11); Buckets of Blood Arete 5.11
- Stars: 3/5 stars

Carderock Recreation Area is a 100-acre park in Carderock, Maryland, part of the Chesapeake and Ohio Canal National Historical Park. The area is well known as a destination for its outdoor activities of rock climbing, hiking and biking. It is bounded by the Potomac River on the south and the Chesapeake and Ohio Canal on the north, and it is accessed from Clara Barton Parkway from the same exit as Carderock Division of the Naval Surface Warfare Center.

The Recreation Area includes a picnic shelter, section C of the Billy Goat Trail, convenient access to the Chesapeake and Ohio Canal, and popular rock cliffs. The area has a long history of climbing and is notable for being the closest significant climbing area to Washington, D.C. As such, it is one of the most climbed cliffs in the eastern United States. There is no fee to enter the park.

== Origins ==
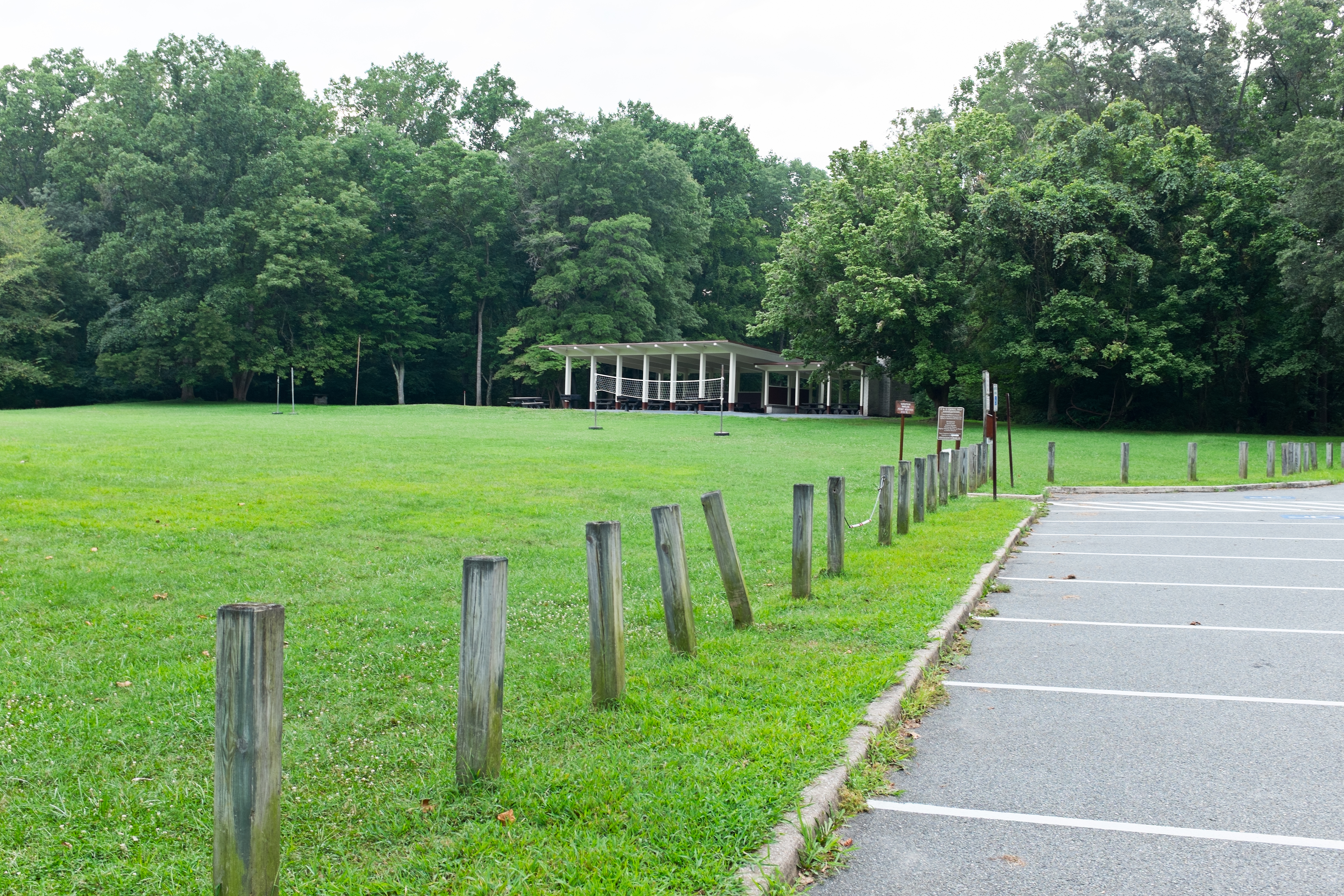
Pavilion at Carderock for picnics

Carderock's name is first recorded as a 1,705-acre tract registered in 1802 with state of Maryland by Robert Peter of Georgetown. The Chesapeake and Ohio Canal was built between 1828 and 1850 and closed in 1924. The canal was purchased in 1938 by US Government and eventually made into the park.

== Rock climbing ==
The rock cliffs are made of Wissahikon Mica-schist and range from 25 to 60 feet (7.6 to 18.3 meters), with the majority of the climbs about 35 feet (11 m). They pack over 100 established climbs within approximately 200 yards (180 m) of the cliff. The rock has form of friction slabs, overhangs, and cracks. Most of the routes are easy and moderate top-rope routes, with a few harder climbs as well as numerous eliminate routes and boulder problems. Traditional climbing is not recommended since protection is often difficult to place and the schist has a reputation for being friable and breakable if a piece of gear is subjected to a leader fall. The area known for its esoteric bouldering, often very different in character from other bouldering areas and relying heavily on delicate footwork between quartz crystal knobs and nubbins imbedded in polished schist wall.

=== History ===
Carderock is one of the oldest established climbing areas in the eastern United States, with roots reaching back to 1920s when Gustave Gambs, Don Hubbard, and Paul Bradt began practicing here. The area's first climbing guide, Rock Climbs Near Washington, was written by Don Hubbard and published in the Potomac Appalachian Trail Club (PATC) Bulletin in July 1943. In 1942, Herb and Jan Conn began climbing at Carderock. They climbed and named many of the routes at Carderock, including Herbie’s Horror, Jan’s Face and Ronnie’s Leap, which was named after their dog. Herbie’s Horror, first climbed by Herb Conn, was one of the first 5.9 routes in the eastern United States.
