= Dart gun (disambiguation) =

A dart gun is an air rifle that fires a dart containing a sedative, vaccine, or antibiotic.

Dart gun may also refer to:

- Blowgun, a ranged weapon consisting of a long narrow tube for shooting light projectiles such as darts
- Crossbow, a bow-like ranged weapon that shoots arrow-like projectiles called bolts or quarrels
- Needlegun, a firearm that fires small, sometimes fin-stabilized, metal darts or flechettes
- Nerf Blaster, a toy gun made by Hasbro that fires foam darts
- Spear-thrower, a tool that uses leverage to achieve greater velocity in dart or javelin-throwing

== See also ==
- Dart (disambiguation)
- Needle gun (disambiguation)
