= Dummy Lake (Ontario) =

- Location within Ontario
- Location: Kenora District, Ontario, Canada
- Coordinates: 50°07′04″N 94°31′21″W
- Type: lake
- Primary inflows: Namego Creek
- Primary outflows: Namego Creek
- Max. length: 2.0 kilometres (1.2 mi)
- Max. width: 1.6 kilometres (0.99 mi)
- Surface area: 1.018 square kilometres (0.393 sq mi)
- Surface elevation: 353 metres (1,158 ft)

Dummy Lake is a lake in the Unorganized Part of Kenora District, Ontario, Canada. The lake is at an elevation of 353 metres (1,158 ft), is 2.0 kilometres (1.2 mi) long and 1.6 kilometres (0.99 mi) wide, and has an area of 101.84 hectares (251.7 acres).

The only named inflow, arriving from Namego Lake, and outflow, heading to Bakado Lake, is Namego Creek. The creek flows to Fiord Bay on Separation Lake, part of the English River. Dummy Lake is thus part of the Lake Winnipeg drainage basin.

== See also ==
- List of lakes in Ontario
