= Jan and Herb Conn =

American climbing and caving pioneers

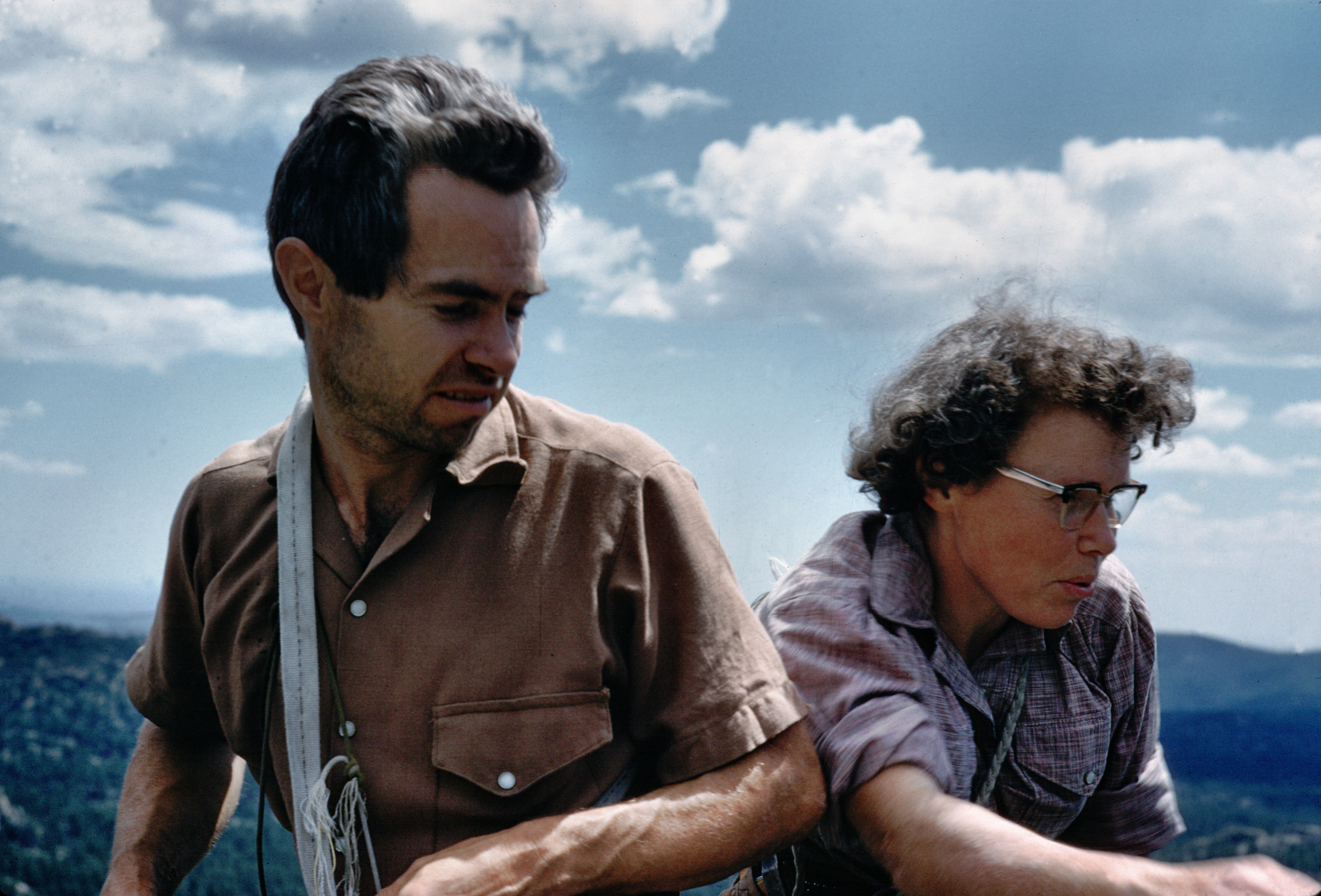
- Black Hills in 1959

Jan Conn
- Born: April 22, 1924; Takoma Park, Maryland
- Died: May 13, 2023 (aged 99); Custer, South Dakota
- Known for: Rock climbing and caving

Herb Conn
- Born: Herbert William Conn; April 16, 1920 upstate New York
- Died: February 1, 2012 (aged 91); Custer, South Dakota
- Known for: Rock climbing and caving

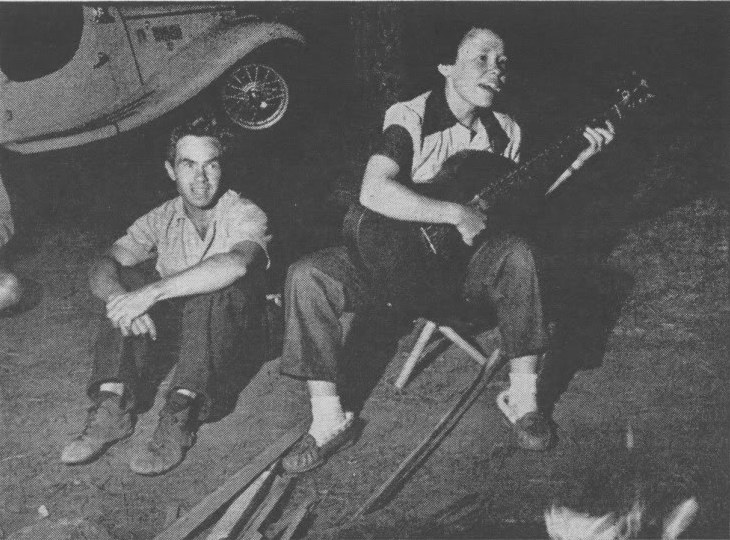
Jan and Herb Conn at Devils Tower, 1956

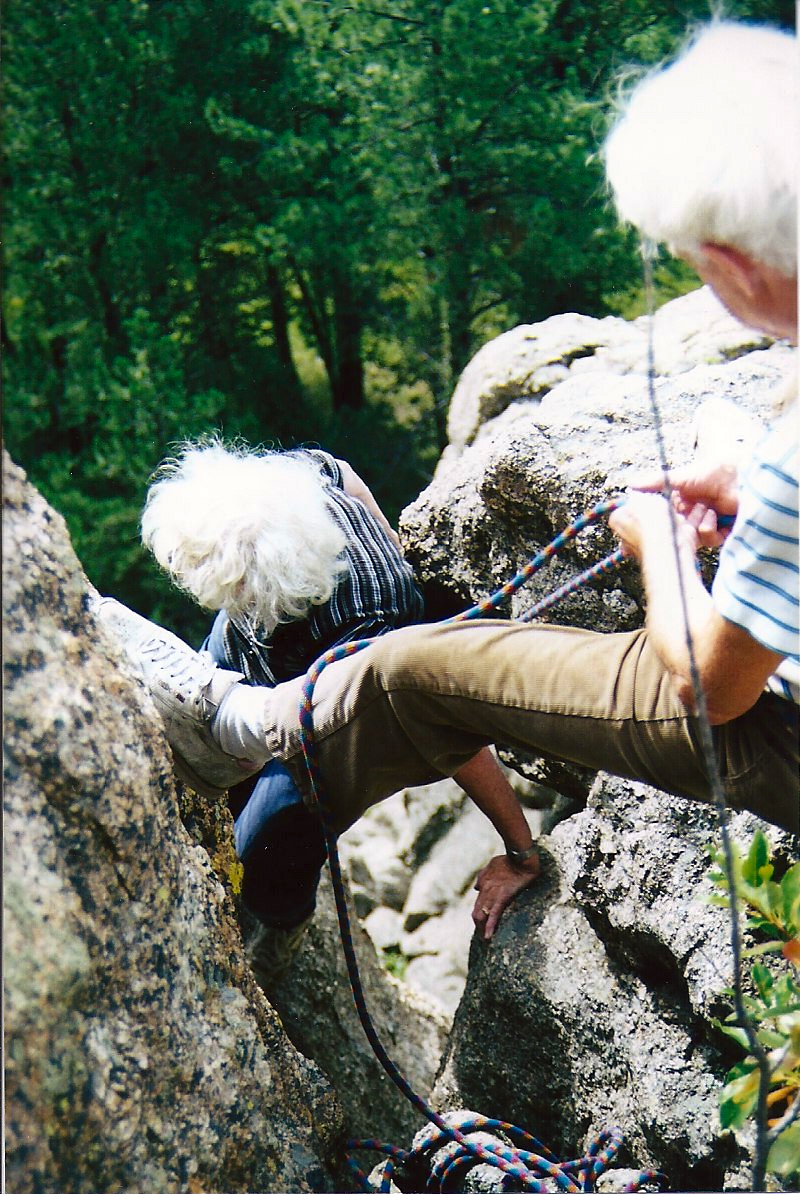
Jan and Herb Conn climbing in the Needles - 2000s. Herb belaying using hip belay technique. The Conns did not use harness or belaying devices. They used 80 foot ropes, which are about a third of the length of modern ropes, and they usually downclimbed instead of rappelling.

Jan H. Conn (April 22, 1924 – May 13, 2023) and Herbert William Conn (April 16, 1920 – February 1, 2012) were climbing and caving pioneers. They are credited with establishing many classic climbs in areas like Carderock in Maryland, Seneca Rocks in West Virginia, Cannon Cliff in New Hampshire and Black Hills of South Dakota. They are also well known as cave explorers who in the 1960s and 1970s discovered and mapped over 60 miles of Jewel Cave, currently the world’s fifth-longest cave system.

== Early life and education ==
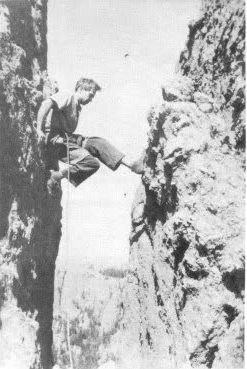
Herb Conn Chimneying in 1950s

Both Herb and Jan were born and raised on the East Coast. Jan grew up in Maryland, just outside Washington, DC in a household with two older sisters. Jan loved music and played flute, classical guitar and several other instruments. Herb grew up in upstate New York, and graduated from the University of Colorado. Herb and Jan married in 1944.

During World War II, Herb served as an electrical engineer for the Navy Department in Washington, DC. Jan and Herb spent their spare time exploring the rocks surrounding Washington DC, most notably Carderock where they began climbing in 1942. They climbed and named many of the routes at Carderock, including Herbie’s Horror, Jan's Face, Spider Walk and Ronnie's Leap, which was named after their dog. Herbie’s Horror, first climbed by Herb, was one of the first 5.9 routes in the eastern United States. They also made the first documented ascents of the routes Conn's East and Conn's West at Seneca Rocks, following the pitons left by the mountain troops who trained there. In a letter to the Potomac Appalachian Trail Club Mountaineering Section the Conns describe a visit to Seneca with Don Hubbard: "Don and the two of us climbed the south peak on a gorgeous moonlit evening, carrying sleeping bags, and spent the night on the narrow summit ridge. Don woke up in the night to see the lower half of Jan’s bag flapping over the edge. But Jan was safely curled up in the top half, still anchored to a piton in the rock." In 1944 they started publishing "Up Rope" magazine, which became the official newsletter of the Mountaineering Section of the Potomac Appalachian Trail Club (PATC).

== Traveling climbers ==
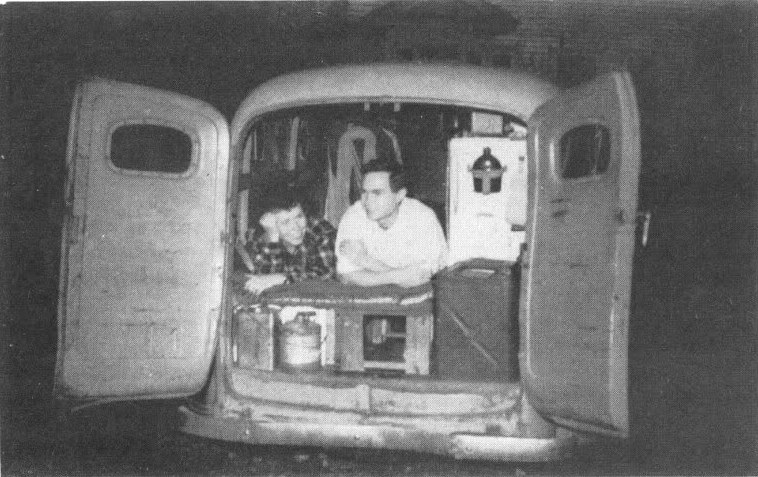
Jan and Herb Conn in their camper

In 1946, Herb was discharged from the US Army and the Conns began a five-year period of traveling and climbing around the US with short forays into Canada and Mexico. They became pioneers of what is now praisingly referred to as dirtbag climbing, which they described in the We work in our spare time article: "it is a simple matter of mathematics - two people working six months a year are just as good as one person working twelve months to support two people". They lived in a self-equipped camper converted from a ten-year-old "panel delivery truck". For several years they worked odd jobs and climbed at many locations from Yosemite in California to Mount Katahdin in Maine, making scattered first ascents along the way in places like Cannon Cliff in New Hampshire, Santa Catalina Mountains and Monument Valley in Arizona, Zion National Park in Utah, and Big Bend National Park in Texas.

Herb and Jan usually sought the easiest and most direct routes to the top of the most striking rock formations. Before the development of specialized climbing shoes, harnesses, and protection, like nuts and cams, they climbed in smooth-soled tennis shoes with 80-foot laid nylon rope tied around their waists and used pitons for protection. In the early days, many pitons were US Army issue scavenged at Seneca Rocks after World War II. They used body belays and down-climbed their routes instead of rappelling, if it was not possible to walk-off. In spite of this, they established many routes that would be challenging and often terrifying to today's climbers.

In 1947 on a trip to climb Devils Tower, the Conns passed through the Black Hills of South Dakota. It was then that they discovered the Needles, with a seemingly unlimited quantity of excellent climbing. They settled in the Black Hills where they made around 220 first ascents in the Needles and published a climbing guidebook to the area. With no other climbers in the area they felt, as Herb put it, "like a couple of cats in an untended fish market."

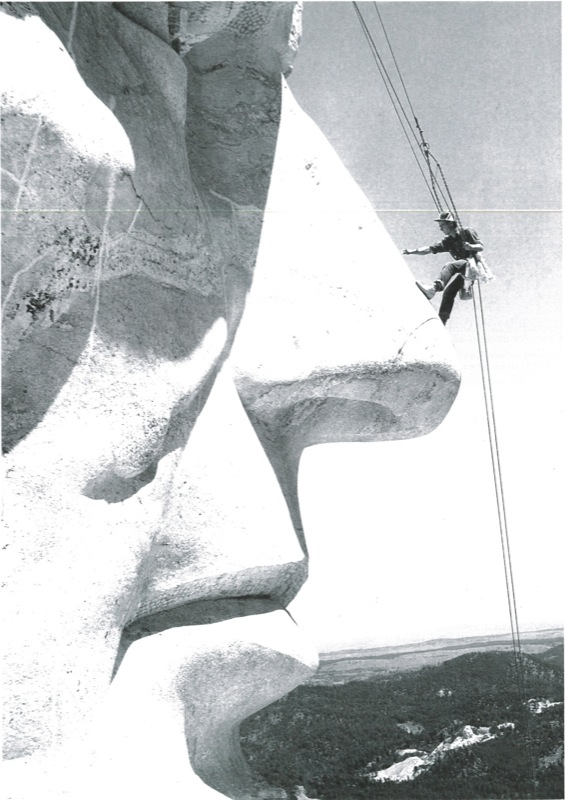
Herb Conn doing maintenance work on Mount Rushmore in 1960s or 1970s

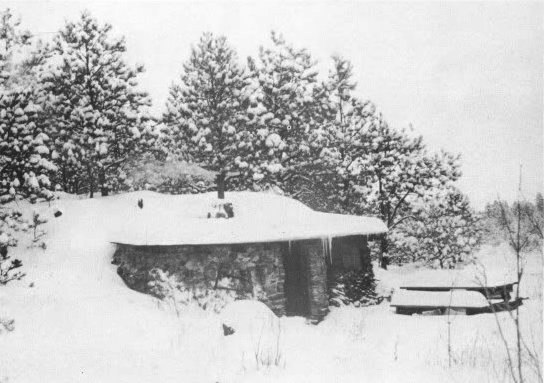
Jan and Herb Conn's self-build house "Conncave"

In 1949 they bought 20 acres in the Custer area and adjacent to the Needles. A couple years after that they built a small, rustic stone home they called Conncave where they lived off the grid, without running water or electricity, for the next 60 years. To help finance their climbing and later caving adventures they created customized leather and wood products. In addition, each fall for 13 years Herb spent a week doing maintenance work filling in cracks on the four faces of Mount Rushmore, and Jan taught guitar and flute.

== Caving years ==
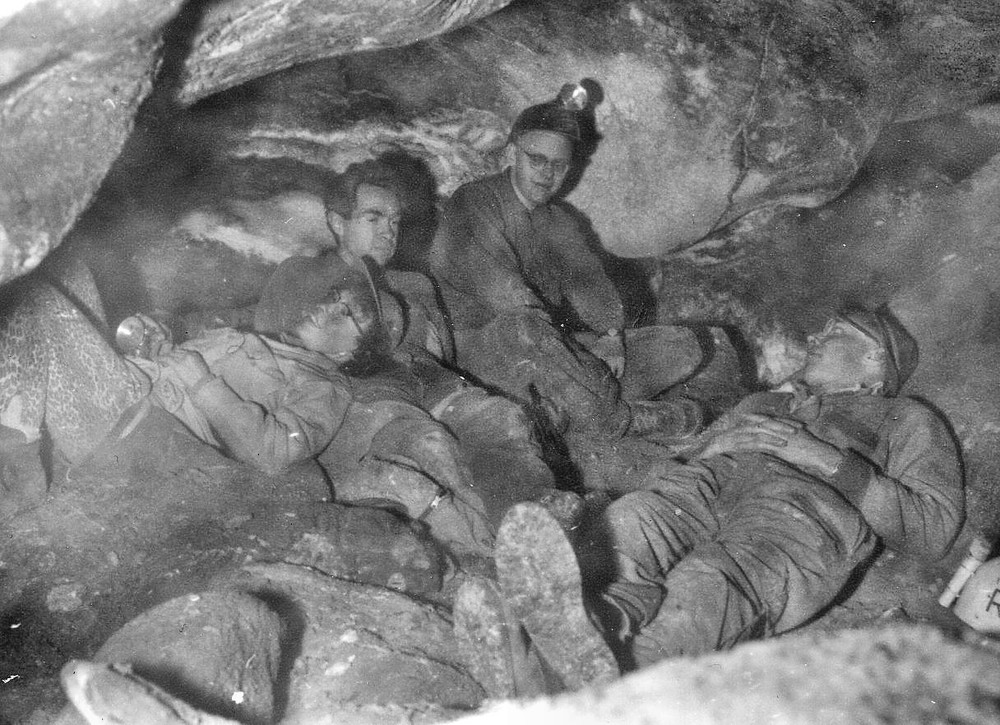
Jan and Herb Conn, Dave Schnute and Dwight Deal in the Jewel Cave, 1959.

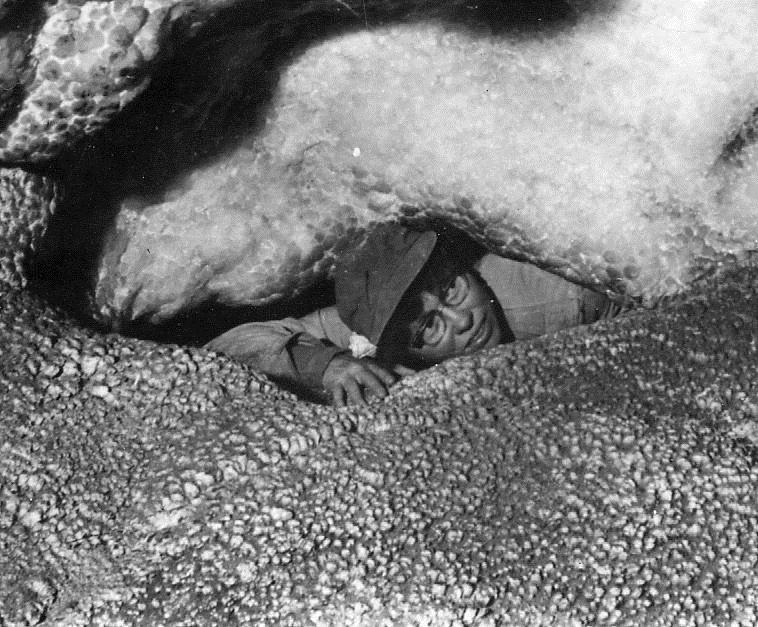
Jan in Janny's Cranny, Jewel Cave, 1959.

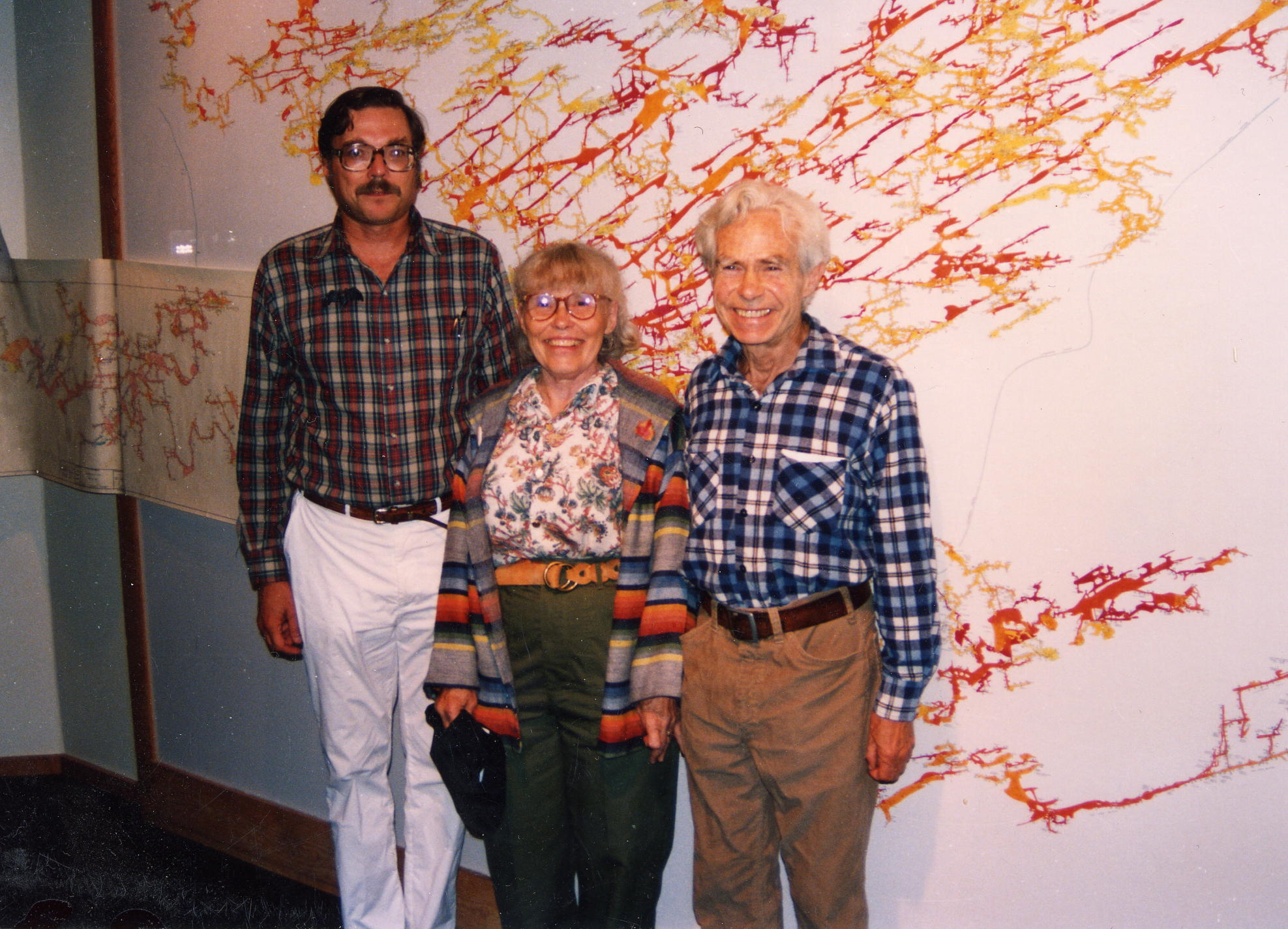
Dwight Deal, Jan and Herb Conn in the Visitor's Center of Jewel Cave National Monument in 1989 on the 30th anniversary of the Deal-Conn exploration effort. In the background Herb's maps of the cave.

In 1959, geologist, mountaineer and caver Dwight Deal had done some exploration in a small cave called Jewel Cave, a little known monument in the National Park System. He needed some companions who might help him continue his exploration trips there and turned to his friends, Herb and Jan. He asked if they would be interested in grubbing around underground and, after thinking it over, they replied they would try it "once". That one trip turned into a passion of exploring Jewel Cave that lasted for over 22 years, and took over 6,000 volunteer hours on 700 trips. From 1959 to 1979, Herb and Jan mapped 62.36 miles of the interior of Jewel Cave. The Conns discovered what is now the Scenic Cave Tour route in 1961. The National Park Service was intrigued by their reports of high, narrow passageways, huge rooms and unusual speleothems (cave decorations) and opened a new tour route. In addition to assisting with the construction of this trail, Herb also designed the lighting system and dramatic placement of lights still in use today. The cave winds that enticed the explorers further into the cave fascinated Herb, and in 1966 he produced an important scientific paper explaining reasons for these barometric winds. The Conn's book, "The Jewel Cave Adventure," serves not only as a record of their years of cave exploration here, but as an exciting tale of adventure even for non-cavers.

In years 1963-1965, when exploration trips into Jewel Cave were restricted, the Conns joined David Schnute exploring Wind Cave. In 1963 the trio found new passages breaking away from the known portion of the cave and allowing them to discover, name, and survey 15,740 feet of virgin passage. They largely retired from caving by the early 1980s.

== Jan Conn as musician and artist ==
Jan's musical play, Run to Catch a Pine Cone, has been performed throughout the country. She composed many songs and melodies, was a founding member of the musical group "French Creek Folk" (Custer, SD), taught music in the Black Hills area, played flute and guitar (and sometimes stand-up bass), and sang and yodeled — even underwater on occasion. Jan also was an accomplished rubber stamp artist.

== Legacy ==
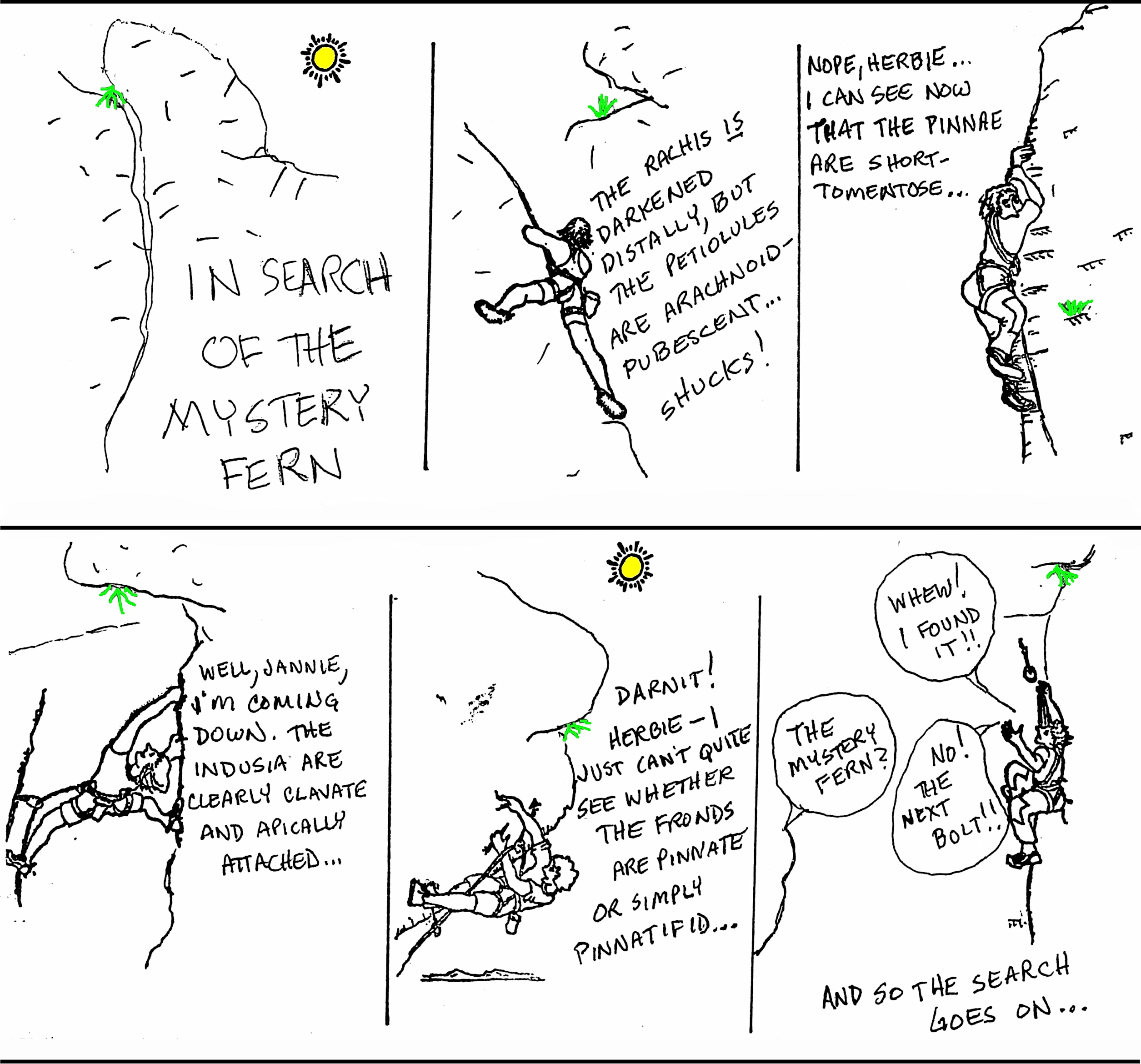
Search for the mystery fern cartoon depicting search for Asplenium Xalternifolium in Black Hills

In a 2008 interview for Climbing Magazine the Conns explained: "I know sometimes people think we had this high dream of living like this, in a place like this … it wasn’t that way. We just kept backing away from the things we didn’t like. This is where we landed." In a 2008 talk, Jan said that they no longer climb rocks, but still enjoy the outdoors. She said, "Fortunately, the slower we move the more we see.

In summer of 1985, Herb and Jan Conn were awarded the Conservation Service Award by the Secretary of the Interior, Don Hodel.

On September 17, 2011, Herb and Jan were inducted into the South Dakota Hall of Fame in recognition of their pioneering exploration. Soon afterward Herb's health failed and on February 1, 2012, he died in his sleep in his home near Custer, at the age of 91. Jan died of natural causes on May 13, 2023 aged 99.

== First ascents and significant climbs ==
Most of the climbs below were done using free climbing technique without aid climbing.

- Carderock in the 1940s:
  - Herbie's Horror (5.9) - When Herb Conn first climb it in 1942 using top-rope, it was one of the first class 5.9 routes in the eastern United States.
  - Leonards Lunacy (5.10) - First ascent in 1945.
- Cornice (5.7+) - Great Falls, 1945. First ascent by Herb Conn and Sterling Hendricks.
- Conns East (5.6) and Conns West (class 5.4) at Seneca Rocks, c. 1942, first ascents.
- "Conn Course" or "Conncourse" (5.8, 7 pitch) - Cannon Mountain, NH on August 3, 1945, first ascent. This climb no longer exist due to exfoliation of this granite dome, but it shares some pitches with very popular Moby Grape (class 5.8) route.
- "Mule Ear Peaks" - Big Bend National Park, 1940s, first ascent.
- "Dutch Girl" (5.8+) - Lost Mine Pinnacle, Big Bend National Park, 1948, first ascent.
- "Finger Rock" (5.8) - Santa Catalina Mountains, AZ. late 1940s, first ascent.
- "Great White Throne" - Zion National Park, 1949, third ascent
- "West Face" (5.8) - Agathla Peak, Monument Valley, Arizona. First ascent of the peak was done on May 29, 1949, by Ray Garner, Herb Conn, and Lee Pedrick.
- "Soler" (class 5.9-) - Devils Tower in 1951. First ascent by Tony Soler, Art Lembeck, Herb Conn, Ray Moore, Chris Scordus
- Durrance Route (5.7) - Devils Tower (June 1952): first "manless" ascent by Jan Conn and Jane Showacre
- About 220 first ascents in the Black Hills Needles, including:

- "Conn Diagonal" (5.7, 3 pitches), Outer Outlet. First ascent on August 26, 1953.

First ascents of Diagonal on Outer Outlet (drawing by Herb)

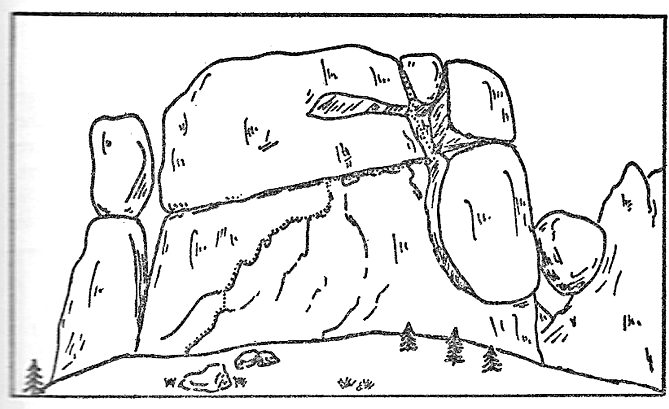

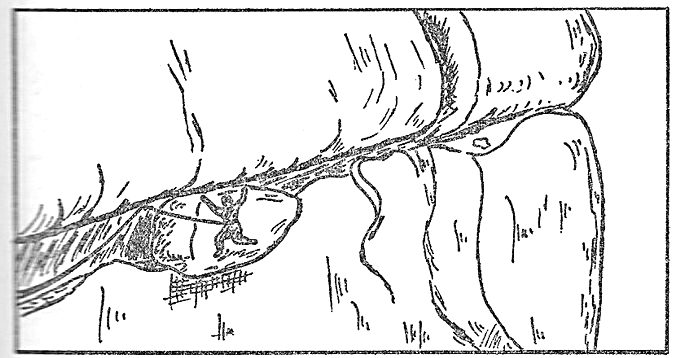

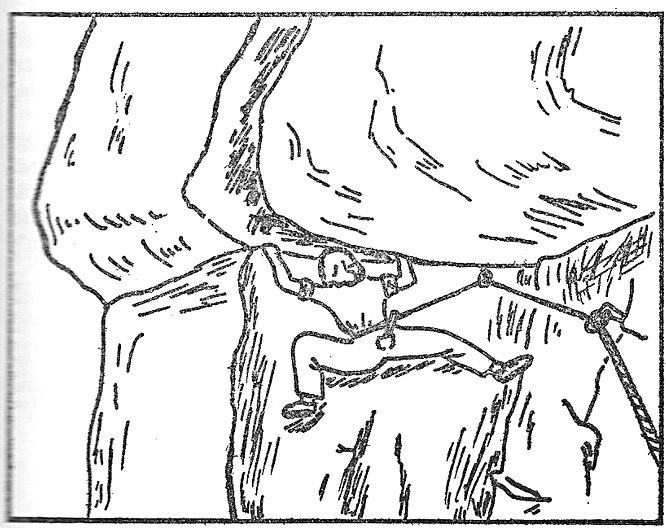

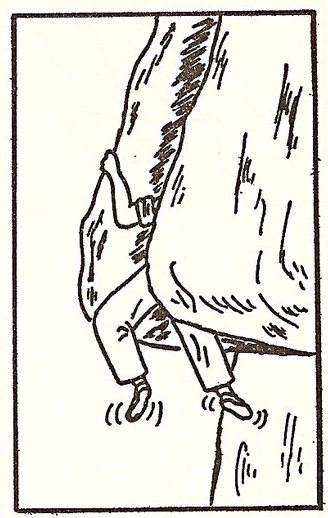
Exit chimney on Diagonal Traverse

- "South Tower Conn Route" (5.9, 2 pitches),Spire 4, Cathedral Spires. First ascent on June 8, 1953.

First ascents of South Tower of Cathedral Spires (drawing by Herb)

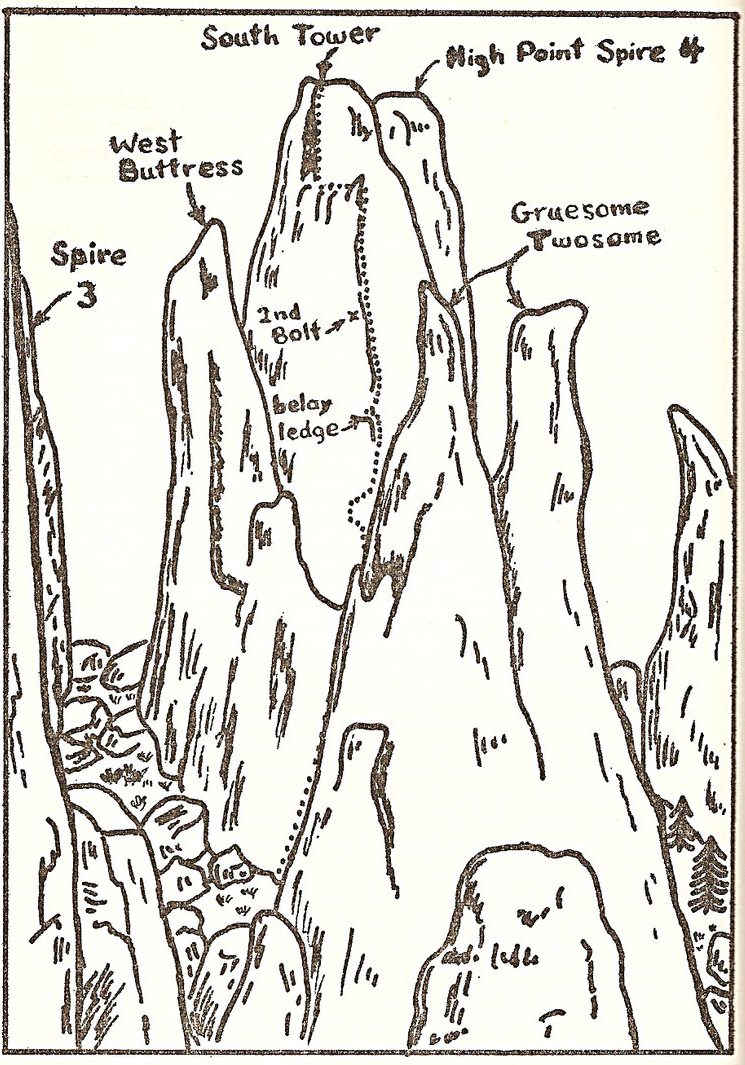

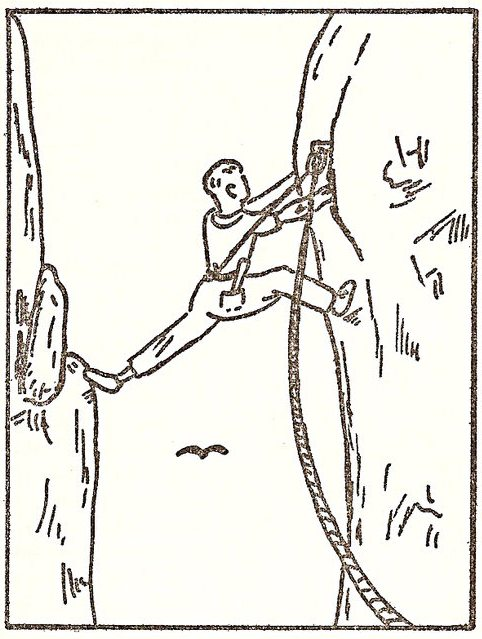

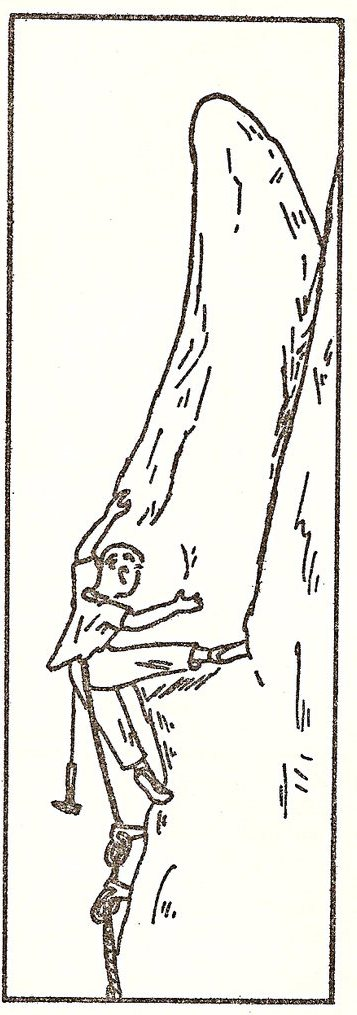
Surmounting the pillar

- "East Gruesome" (5.10- R, 2 pitches),Spire 4, Cathedral Spires. First ascent on September 7, 1959.

== Works ==
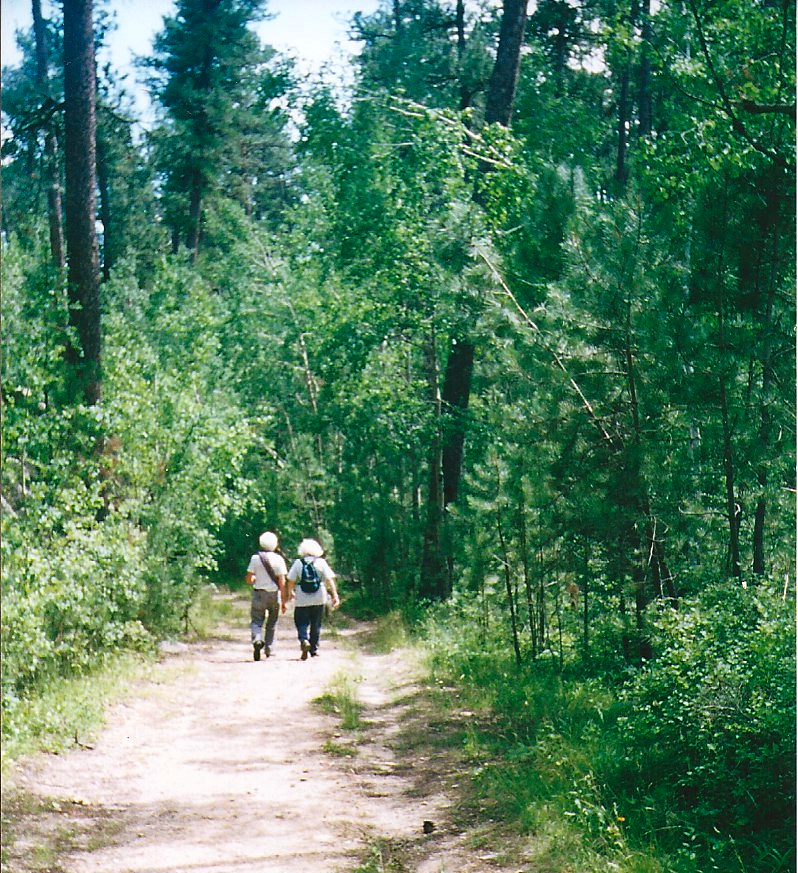
Herb and Jan, in their 80s, walking back to the Conn Cave after a day of climbing

- Conn, Herb. "New Frontier for the Rock Climber". Appalachia. XXVII: 158–163.
- Conn, Herb (June 1953). "The Needles in Review". Appalachia. XXIX: 356–365. (PDF)
- Conn, Jan (December 15, 1952). "Manless Ascent of Devils Tower". Appalachia. XXIX: 225–227.
- Conn, Herb; Conn, Jan (June 1955). "Climbing highlights of the Black Hills". Appalachia. (PDF)
- Conn, Herb and Jan, A World Awaits Below. Unpublished draft: 93 p.
- Conn, Herb; Conn, Jan (October 1956). "Climbing Fun in the Needles". Summit (PDF).
- Conn, Herb; Conn, Jan (September 1956). "Devils Tower". Summit.
- Conn, Herb; Conn, Jan (July 1957). "The Ethics and Mountain Climbing". Summit (PDF).
- Conn, Herb; Conn, Jan (November 1957). "The versatile runner". Summit (PDF).
- Conn, Jan; Conn, Herb (November 1957). "We work in our spare time". Summit (PDF).
- Conn, Herb (ca. 1957). Rock Climbs in the Needles: Black Hills of South Dakota, SAC. First guidebook to Needles.
- Conn, Herb (1958). Jam Crack Joe - Summit (PDF)
- Conn, Herb and Jan (February 1959). The right piton when you need it - Summit (PDF)
- Conn, Jan (September 1960). "Balay Points to Ponder". Summit.
- Conn, Herb and Jan (1964). Jewel Cave. National Speleological Society News: 72-73.
- Conn, Herb (1966). "Barometric Wind in Wind and Jewel Caves, South Dakota". National Speleological Society Bulletin. 28 (2): 55–69. Archived from the original on February 23, 2008.
- Conn, Herb and Jan (1972). Report from Jewel Cave. National Speleological Society News: 85-92.
- Conn, Herb (1975). Jewel Cave : Jewel Cave National Monument, Custer County, South Dakota (Map). OCLC 21800519.
- Conn, Herb and Jan; Conn, Jan (1977). The Jewel Cave adventure : fifty miles of discovery under South Dakota. Teaneck, NJ.: Zephyrus Press, Inc. ISBN 9780939748013. LCCN 76041281. OCLC 2425430.
- Conn, Herb and Jan (Jan. 1977). Chasing the Winds Through Jewel Cave. In Sloane, Bruce (ed.) Caver, Caves and Caving. Rutgers University Press, New Brunswick, NJ. 409 p.
- Conn, Herb and Jan (1982). The Very Important Shortcut. National Speleological Society News: 300-302.
- Conn, Jan (1986). Run to catch a pine cone : a musical fantasy (musical score). LCCN 88750012. OCLC 17768529.
- Conn, Jan and Herb (1987). "Diaries of Wind Cave Trips" (PDF). Archived from the original (PDF) on February 1, 2014.
- Conn, Herb; Wiles, Mike (1993). Jewel Cave : Jewel Cave National Monument, Custer County, South Dakota (Map). OCLC 33482475.
- Marriott, H.J.; Conn, Jan and Herb (2000). "Asplenium X alternifolium in the Black Hills of South Dakota". American Fern Journal. 90: 109.
