= Namego Lake =

- French: lac Namego
- Location within Ontario
- Location: Kenora District, Ontario, Canada
- Coordinates: 50°07′03″N 94°29′35″W
- Type: lake
- Part of: Lake Winnipeg drainage basin
- Primary outflows: Namego Creek
- Max. length: 3.7 kilometres (2.3 mi)
- Max. width: 1.5 kilometres (0.93 mi)
- Surface area: 2.177 square kilometres (0.841 sq mi)
- Surface elevation: 353 metres (1,158 ft)

Namego Lake (French: lac Namego) is a lake in the Unorganized Part of Kenora District, Ontario, Canada. The lake is at an elevation of 353 metres (1,158 ft), is 3.7 kilometres (2.3 mi) long and 1.5 kilometres (0.93 mi) wide, and has an area of 217.67 hectares (537.9 acres).

The lake is the source of Namego Creek which heads downtream next to Dummy Lake. The creek eventually flows to Fiord Bay on Separation Lake, part of the English River, which makes Namego Lake part of the Lake Winnipeg drainage basin.
