= Nameless Lake (Sudbury District) =

- Location of Nameless Lake in Ontario
- Location: Ontario, Canada
- Coordinates: 46°15′16″N 81°37′23″W
- Type: Lake
- Part of: Lake Huron drainage basin
- Max. length: 750 m (2,460 ft)
- Max. width: 450 m (1,480 ft)
- Surface elevation: 233 m (764 ft)

Nameless Lake is a lake in geographic Foster township in the Unorganized North Part of Sudbury District in Northeastern Ontario, Canada. It part of the Lake Huron drainage basin and is located 10 kilometres (6 mi) east of the town of Espanola. The primary outflow is an unnamed creek to Elisabeth Lake, which flows via Brazil Creek and the Spanish River to Lake Huron.
