= Harold Needler =

British businessman

- Born: July 1910; Kingston upon Hull, England
- Died: July 1975 (aged 64–65); Marylebone, England
- Occupation: Businessman

Harold Needler (July 1910 – July 1975) was a British businessman who is best known for being the chairman of association football club Hull City from 1945 until his death in 1975.

== Early life ==
Harold Needler was born in Kingston upon Hull, East Riding of Yorkshire in July 1910. He was the son of George Needler (1872–1943) and Gertrude Seaman (1875–1958).

== Career ==
=== Early career ===
Needler began his career by becoming an important figure in the local aggregates industry. With the money he earned from his work, he had hoped to launch his own professional association football club in his hometown, to rival the already established Hull City. There were plans to build an elite stadium within a new garden city estate in Sutton-on-Hull to house the team. In the aftermath of the Hull Blitz, there was chance that Needler's grand idea would come to fruition. Due to the destruction caused by the bombing, the possibility of full-scale demolition was considered to help rebuild the city. However, Needler was eventually held back by the Football League. By the 1940s, it was highly irregular for new clubs to be allowed admission into the professional pyramid. As a result, Needler was forced to abandon his plans.

=== Hull City ===
==== Beginnings ====
Instead of giving up altogether, he decided to turn his focus to his once-rivals Hull City. The Tigers were struggling financially following the end of the Second World War, and were in dire need of help. In December 1945, Needler was appointed chairman of the club after he completed a takeover of the Third Division North side. Ahead of the return of professional football in England in 1946, Major Frank Buckley arrived as the club's new manager. Furthermore, to coincide with the restart, the Tigers moved into their new home ground, Boothferry Park, after four decades at nearby Anlaby Road. Boothferry Park's construction was only finished thanks to Needler's fund-injection since his arrival. The stadium had been in the works since 1929, but had seen slow progress due to the club's financial difficulties and impact of the Second World War. The first competitive fixture at the new ground was the opening game of the 1946–47 season, a 0–0 draw with Lincoln City in front of 25,586 spectators on 31 August 1946. In Needler's debut campaign, Hull achieved a respectable position, finishing in 11th-place.

After an improved 5th-place the following season and the departure of Buckley to Leeds United, experienced forward Raich Carter was promoted to become the team's player-manager. Buckley had personally chosen Carter to succeed him in charge, and so when he left in April 1948, Needler could only accept the Major's wishes and allow the 34-year-old to lead from within. This decision proved to be wise, as the 1948–49 season saw Carter and his teammates win Hull's second-ever league title.

==== Boothferry Park ====
Boothferry Park had cost approximately £80,000 to build. Despite this, only the West Stand had been completed in time for the Tigers' first game there against Lincoln. The ground's construction had been hurried, with builder Tim Vincent later saying that he and his colleagues had been given just five months to prepare it in time for the opening game. Regardless, the match programme that day included comments from Needler which outlined his hopes for the stadium's future. He stated his aim for the capacity to increase to as high as "80,000 people or more", as well as it being fit to host international fixtures and FA Cup semi-finals. Additionally, he also noted his desire for extensive car park access and a purpose-built railway station.

Although Boothferry Park never achieved most of Needler's aims, it did continue to develop and grow as the 1950s approached. On 26 February 1949, a record-breaking 55,019 spectators crammed into the ground to watch Hull face Manchester United in an FA Cup quarter-final. On 6 January 1951, one of the optimistic chairman's dreams came true. Boothferry Park Halt opened to serve supporters travelling to the stadium. It would ultimately close in 1986 because of safety concerns. Soon after the opening of the station, the eastern Kempton Stand was finished and two large floodlight pylons were installed. Progress then plateaued until Needler invested £260,000 in the early 1960s. Six modernised floodlights replaced the originals in 1963, before a further £50,000 covered the cost of a state-of-the-art gymnasium in 1964. Needler's money also paid for the new £130,000 South Stand, which opened the following year in 1965.

==== Later years ====
In the 1965–66 season, Hull won the now-unified Third Division. The manager at the time was Cliff Britton, who had become the first manager in the club's history to be handed a 10-year contract, which Needler had done in 1961.

== Personal life ==
Needler died in July 1975. His passing left his son, Christopher Needler, in charge of Hull City as chairman. Christopher would remain involved with the club, to varying extents, until 1997.
