= Nadil =

- Municipality
- Location within Azerbaijan
- Coordinates: 40°44′29″N 46°17′20″E
- Country: Azerbaijan
- Rayon: Goygol

Population
  - Total: 1,032
- Time zone: UTC+4 (AZT)
  - Summer (DST): UTC+5 (AZT)

Nadil (also, Nadel’ and Nadjl) is a village and municipality in the Goygol Rayon of Azerbaijan. It has a population of 1,032.
