= Belverd Needles =

American economist

Academic background
- Education: Texas Tech University; University of Illinois at Urbana-Champaign

Belverd Needles is an American economist, currently the Ernst & Young Distinguished Professor of Accountancy at DePaul University. He holds a PhD in Accounting (with a Finance and Economics minor) from the University of Illinois at Urbana–Champaign, and Master of Business Administration and Bachelor of Business Administration degrees from Texas Tech University.

Needles began working at DePaul University in September 1978.
