= Space Needle (disambiguation) =

The Space Needle is an observation tower in Seattle, Washington, United States.

Space Needle may also refer to:

- CN Tower, an observation tower in Toronto, Canada, that is known locally as the "Toronto Space Needle"
- Gatlinburg Space Needle, an observation tower in Gatlinburg, Tennessee, United States
- Space Needle (band), an American experimental rock band
