= USS Needle =

Patrol vessel of the United States Navy

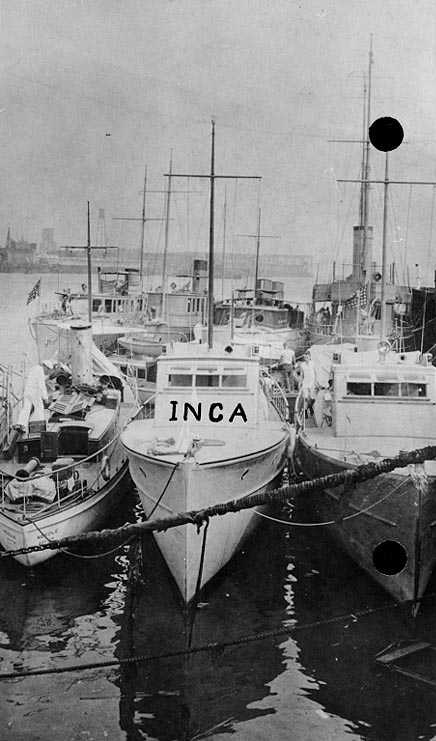
- Needle is in the left foreground in this photograph of boats undergoing conversion for World War I use as United States Navy patrol vessels, ca. July 1917. In the center foreground is USS Inca (SP-1212). The boat on the right and the four boats in the background are unidentified.

History

United States
- Name: USS Needle
- Namesake: Previous name retained
- Builder: George Lawley & Son, Neponset, Massachusetts
- Completed: 1906
- Acquired: 9 June 1917
- Commissioned: 20 June 1917
- Stricken: 18 August 1919
- Fate: Sold 16 September 1919
- Notes: Operated as private motorboat Needle 1906-1917

General characteristics
- Type: Patrol vessel
- Tonnage: 22 gross register tons
- Length: 71 ft (22 m)
- Beam: 10 ft (3.0 m)
- Draft: 3 ft 9 in (1.14 m)
- Speed: 12 knots
- Armament: 2 × machine guns

USS Needle (SP-649) was a United States Navy patrol vessel in commission from 1917 to 1919.

Needle was built as a private motorboat of the same name by George Lawley & Son at Neponset, Massachusetts, in 1906. On 9 June 1917, the U.S. Navy acquired her from her owner, George L. Batchelder of Medford, Massachusetts, for use as a section patrol boat during World War I. She was commissioned as USS Needle (SP-649) on 20 June 1917.

Needle carried out patrol duties for the rest of World War I and into 1919.

Needle was stricken from the Navy List on 18 August 1919 and sold to Morgan Barney of New York City on 16 September 1919.
