= Needlefish (disambiguation) =

A needlefish is a piscivorous fish usually associated with shallow marine habitats or the surface of the open sea.

Needlefish may also refer to:

- USS Needlefish (SS-376), Balao-class submarine
- USS Needlefish (SS-493), Tench-class submarine
