= Christopher Needler =

British businessman (1944–2022)

- Born: George Henry Christopher Needler; 4 September 1944; Kirk Ella, East Riding of Yorkshire, England
- Died: 19 December 2022 (aged 78); Monaco
- Occupation: Businessman

George Henry Christopher Needler (4 September 1944 – 19 December 2022), known simply as Christopher Needler, was a British businessman who is best known for being the chairman of association football club Hull City from 1975 until 1982.

== Early life ==
Needler was born in the small village of Kirk Ella, East Riding of Yorkshire, just west of Kingston upon Hull, on 4 September 1944. His father, Harold Needler, was the owner of the Hoveringham Group Ltd, a construction aggregate company.

By the time Christopher began attending Repton School in Derbyshire, his father had become the chairman of association football club Hull City. After Repton, Needler spent five years qualifying as a Chartered Accountant (CPA), and three additional years as a mature student at Trinity College, Cambridge.

== Career ==
In 1971, he joined the family business with the Hoveringham Group. When his father suddenly died in 1975, Needler took control of both the business and Hull City. In 1981, he sold Hoveringham to Tarmac plc, although continued his involvement in a number of private family businesses. The following year, former professional wrestling promoter Don Robinson bought out Hull City to save them from receivership. However, just like he had done with Hoveringham, Needler stayed involved with the football club for years to come as a director. He finally relinquished his family's long-held control over the Tigers in 1997, selling it to the captain of the British Davis Cup team at the time, David Lloyd.

Once departed from all his previous businesses, Needler began a debt counselling company called DebtWatchers in the 2000s.

== Personal life ==
Needler eventually retired to Monaco, where he lived with his wife, Delphine, and her daughter, Loulou.

== Death ==
Needler was diagnosed with Amyotrophic Lateral Sclerosis (ALS) in his mid-70s. He later died in Monaco on 19 December 2022, at the age of 78.
