= Needles (Black Hills) =

Towers of eroded granite in the Black Hills of South Dakota, USA

The Needles
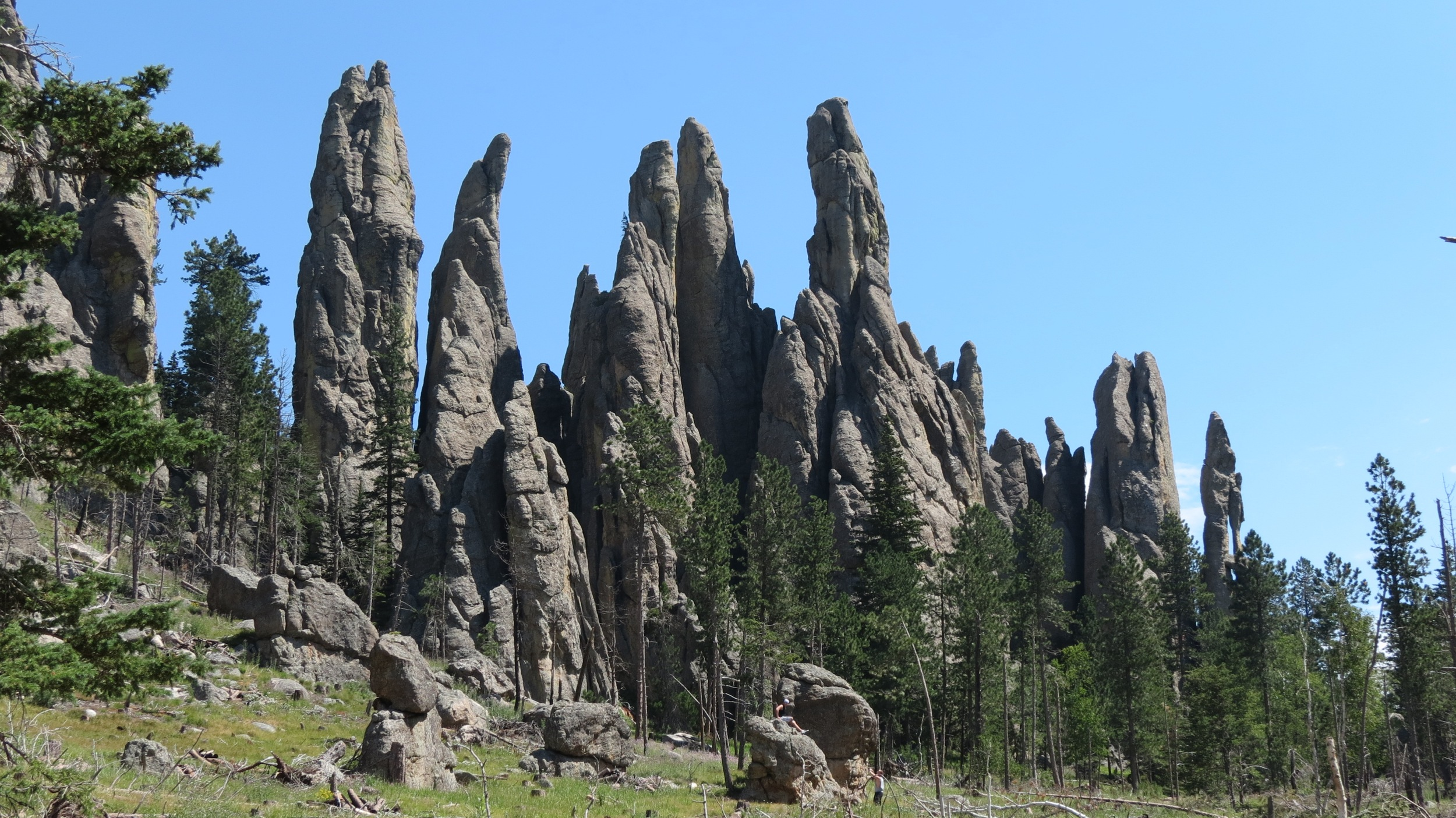
- The Needles, South Dakota, United States

- Location within South Dakota
- Nearest city: Custer, South Dakota
- Range: Black Hills
- Coordinates: 43°50′28″N 103°32′40″W
- Type of climbing: traditional face and crack climbing and bouldering
- Height range: 500 feet (150 m)
- Pitches range: 1 to 4
- NCCS grades: 5.0-5.13
- Rock type: granite, pegmatite
- Quantity of routes: years worth ( 2,000 summits)
- Climbing area developed: well developed
- Cliff aspect: mixed mainly traditional climbing
- Season: spring to fall
- Ownership: State park
- Camping: none
- Stars: 5/5 stars

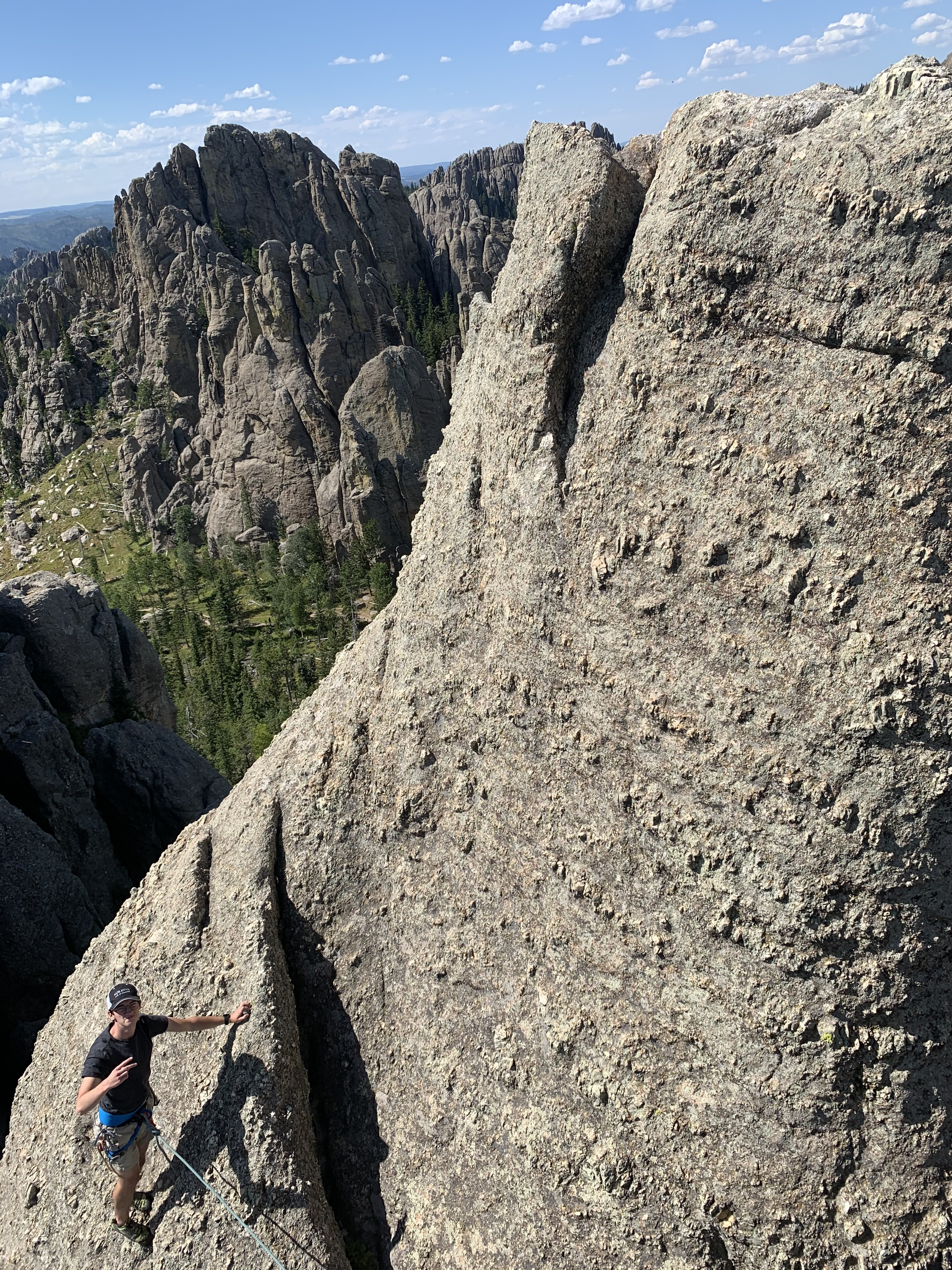
A climber ascends spire nine in The Needles

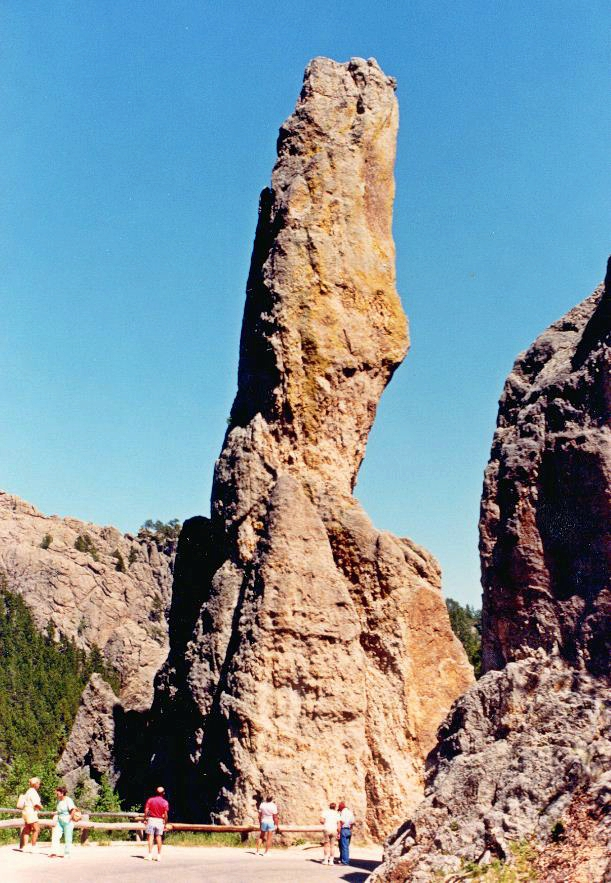
A roadside needle

The Needles of the Black Hills of South Dakota are a region of eroded granite pillars, towers, and spires within Custer State Park. Popular with rock climbers and tourists alike, the Needles are accessed from the Needles Highway, which is a part of Sylvan Lake Road (SD 87/89). The Cathedral Spires and Limber Pine Natural Area, a 637-acre (258 ha) portion of the Needles containing six ridges of pillars as well as a disjunct stand of limber pine, was designated a National Natural Landmark in 1976.

The Needles were the original site proposed for the Mount Rushmore carvings. The location was rejected by the sculptor Gutzon Borglum owing to the poor quality of the granite and the fact that they were too thin to support the sculptures. The Needles attract approximately 300,000 people annually.

== Climbing ==
In 1936 Fritz Wiessner climbed the Totem Pole and in 1937 Khayyam Spire with Bill House and Lawrence Coveney. In 1947 Jan and Herb Conn moved to the area and over the next couple decades put up over 220 first ascents. In 1952 Fred Beckey and John Dudra climbed Rubaiyat Spire and Khayyam Spire. In the 1960s climbers such as Royal Robbins, and Henry Barber put up many bold routes. In 1961 John Gill made a free solo ascent of 5.12a route on The Thimble which is considered one of the first climbs at that grade and still is a formidable challenge. In 1991 John Sherman also made a free solo ascent of Gill's Route.

=== Classic climbs ===
- Spire Two, 5.3
- Innercourse, 5.5
- Rum Room, 5.7
- Tent Peg, 5.7
- Tricuni Nail, 5.8
- Trojan Determination, 5.8
- Behind The Door, 5.9
- Four Little Fishes, 5.9
- Hardrocker, 5.9
- Needle's Eye, 5.10-
- Nentucket Sleigh Ride, 5.10
- Superpin, 5.10b R
- Farewell to Arms, 5.10+
- For Whom the Bell Tolls, 5.11a
- Limited Immunity, 5.11b
- Vertigo, 5.11
- Leaning Jowler, 5.12a
- Walking the Plankton, 5.12b
- Thimble, 5.12a
- Outlet CG Boulders

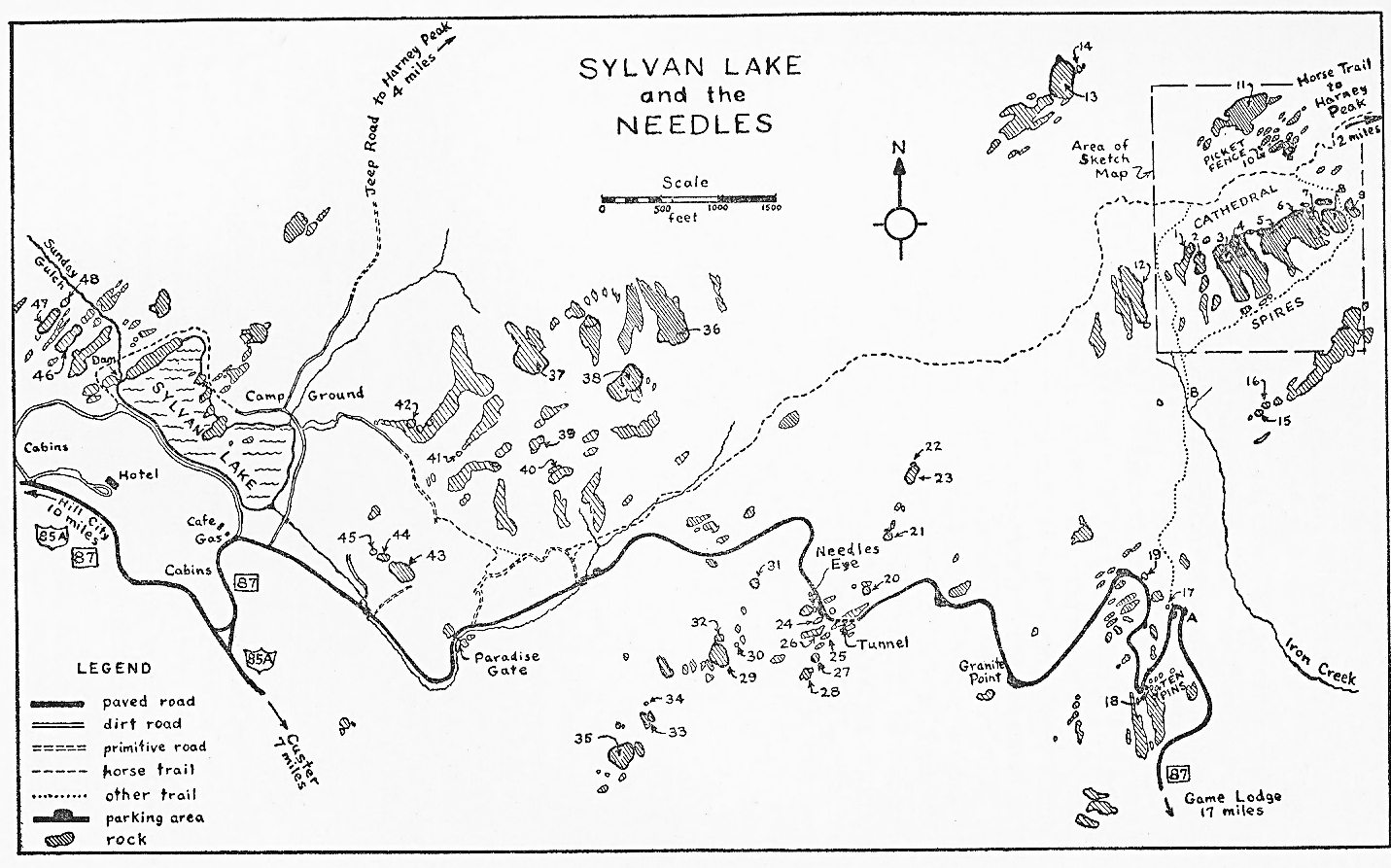
Map of the Needles by climbing and caving pioneers Jan and Herb Conn.
