= Nadal (surname) =

Nadal (Catalan: [nəˈðal], Occitan: [naˈdal, naˈðal], Venetian: [naˈdal]) is a surname of Catalan, Occitan, and Venetian origin. It stems from the Latin word for birthday, natalis. Notable people with the surname include:

- Augustin Nadal (1659–1741), French playwright
- Carlos Nadal (1917–1998), Spanish painter
- Ehrman Syme Nadal (1843–1922), American author
- Iván Nadal (born 1987), Argentine footballer
- Joaquim Nadal (born 1948), Spanish politician
- Jordi Nadal (1929–2020), Spanish economist and historian
- Kevin Nadal (born 1978), Filipino American author, comedian, and professor
- Kitchie Nadal (born 1980), Filipina singer, songwriter, musician
- Lymari Nadal (born 1978), Puerto Rican actress
- Maria Chappelle-Nadal (born 1974), American politician
- Miguel Ángel Nadal (born 1966), Spanish international footballer; Rafael Nadal's uncle
- Rafael Nadal (born 1986), Spanish tennis player; Miguel Ángel Nadal's nephew
- Rosario Nadal (born 1968), Spanish art director
- Serhiy Nadal (born 1975), Ukrainian politician
- Teodoro de Mas y Nadal (1858–1936), Spanish engineer and politician
- Toni Nadal (born 1961), Spanish tennis coach, Rafael Nadal's uncle
- Xisco Nadal (born 1986), Spanish footballer
