= Nungesser Lake =

Lake in Ontario, Canada

- Location within Ontario
- Location: Ontario
- Coordinates: 51°28′12″N 93°33′29″W
- Basin countries: Canada

Ooshkahtahkahwee Sahkaheekahn / Nungesser Lake is a lake in northwestern Ontario, Canada. It is a wilderness lake in Kenora District, about 30 kilometres northeast of the town of Red Lake.

== See also ==
- List of lakes in Ontario
