= South Dakota Highway 377 =

State highway in South Dakota, United States

Highway 377

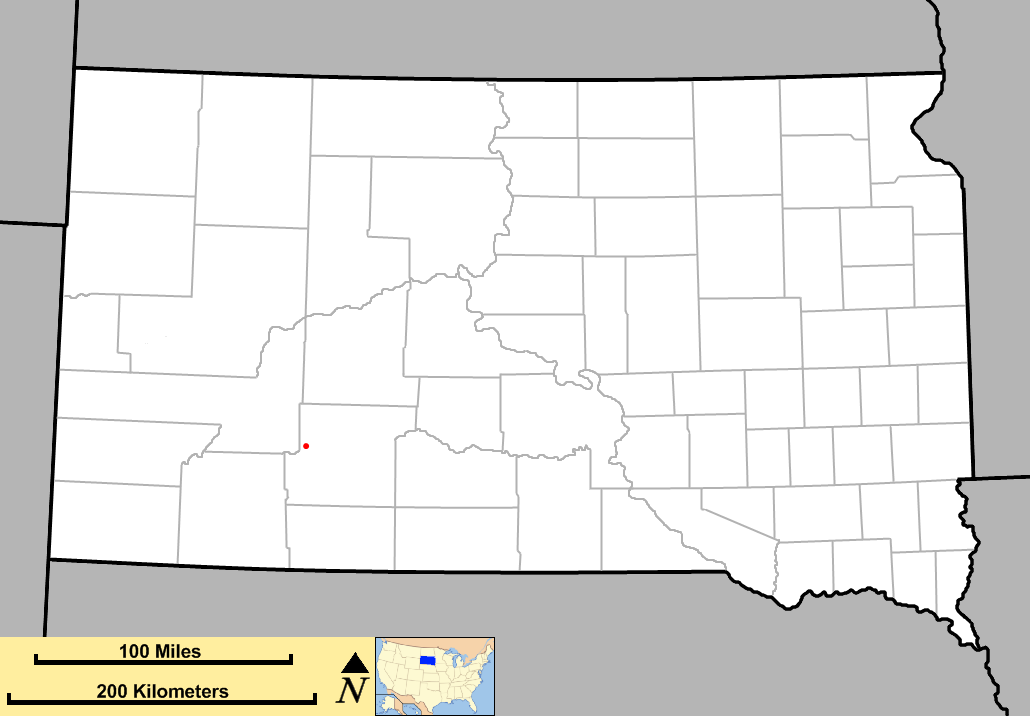
- Location of SD 377 (in red)

Route information
- Maintained by SDDOT
- Length: 2.173 mi (3.497 km)
- Existed: 1976–present

Major junctions
- South end: SD 44 in Interior
- North end: Interior Entrance Station in Badlands National Park

Location
- Country: United States
- State: South Dakota
- Counties: Jackson

Highway system
- South Dakota State Trunk Highway System; Interstate; US; State
| ← SD 365 | → US 385 |

South Dakota Highway 377 (SD 377) is a 2.173-mile-long (3.497 km) state highway in Jackson County, South Dakota, United States. It begins at an intersection with SD 44 in Interior, and travels in a northeasterly direction to its northern terminus at the Interior Entrance Station for Badlands National Park.

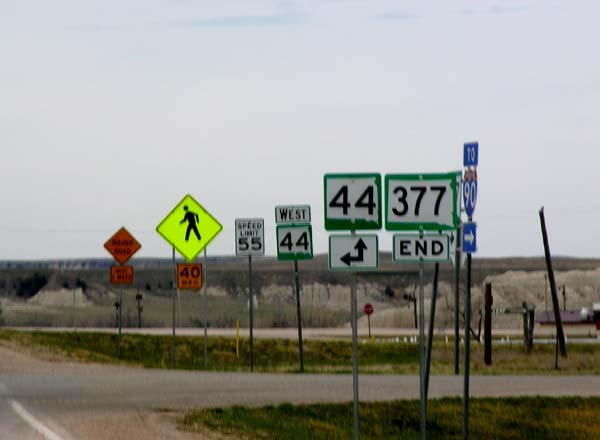
SD 377's southern terminus at SD 44 in Interior, April 2007

== Route description ==
SD 377 begins at an intersection with SD 44 in the northeastern part of Interior. It is a near-straight two-lane highway for its entire length. It ends at the Interior Entrance Station for Badlands National Park.

== Major intersections ==
The entire route is in Jackson County.

| Location | mi | km | Destinations | Notes |
|---|---|---|---|---|
| Interior | 0.000 | 0.000 | SD 44 / A Street west – Scenic, Wanblee | Southern terminus |
| Badlands National Park | 2.173 | 3.497 | Interior Entrance Station | Northern terminus |
1.000 mi = 1.609 km; 1.000 km = 0.621 mi

== See also ==
- List of state highways in South Dakota
