= South Dakota Highway 44 =

State highway in South Dakota, United States

Highway 44

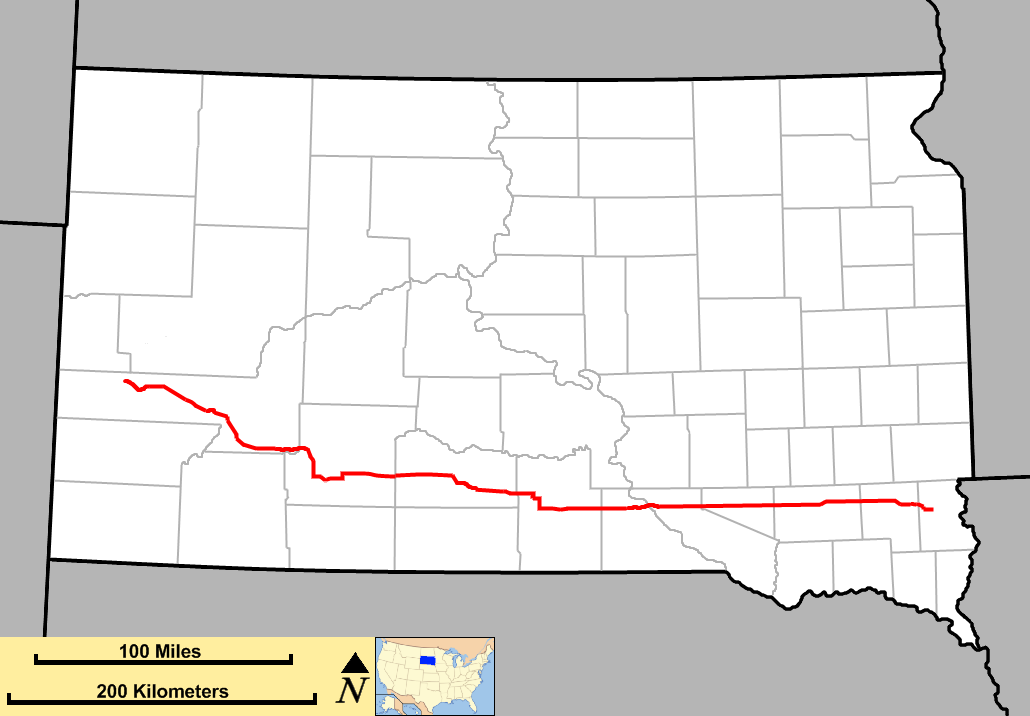
- Route (in red) of SD 44

Route information
- Maintained by SDDOT
- Length: 379.022 mi (609.977 km)

Major junctions
- West end: US 385 near Rapid City
- I-190 in Rapid City; US 16 in Rapid City; US 83 near White River; US 183 near Witten; US 18 near Jordan Junction; US 281 near Corsica
- East end: I-29 near Worthing

Location
- Country: United States
- State: South Dakota

Highway system
- South Dakota State Trunk Highway System; Interstate; US; State
← SD 43	→ SD 45

South Dakota Highway 44 (SD 44) is a state highway in southern South Dakota that runs from U.S. Route 385 (US 385) west of Rapid City to Interstate 29 (I-29) south of Sioux Falls. It is just more than 379 miles (610 km) long.

== Route description ==
SD 44 begins at a junction with US 385 and heads along a curvy road in a general southeasterly direction through the Black Hills National Forest. It curves to the east and leaves the forest, then bends back to the southeast and clips the northeastern corner of the forest before leaving it permanently and entering Rapid City, where it is known as Jackson Boulevard. In the western outskirts of Rapid City, the highway curves to the northeast and passes north of Canyon Lake before crossing Rapid Creek. The road passes near several city parks before turning due north onto Mountain View Road and crossing Main Street, which holds the Interstate 90 Business (I-90 Bus.) designation. A block north of here, SD 44 turns east onto Omaha Street and splits into a four-lane highway. It continues in that direction and intersects the southern terminus of I-190, as well as US 16.

SD 44 and US 16 trek southeast for a short distance before US 16 splits off onto Mt Rushmore Road to the south and SD 44 continues heading southeast along Omaha Street. It crosses the Dakota, Minnesota and Eastern Railroad and then intersects I-90 Bus. again. East of this intersection, SD 44 is reduced to two lanes. It crosses Rapid Creek again, then turns southeast and shares a folded diamond interchange with US 16 Truck and SD 79. Southeast of here, the highway leaves Rapid City and enters unincorporated Rapid Valley. The road parallels a railroad owned by the state of South Dakota as it leaves Rapid Valley and passes just south of the Rapid City Regional Airport.

After departing from the Rapid City area, SD 44 continues southeast and heads through the unincorporated community of Caputa. It crosses Rapid Creek a third and final time, and then curves to the south and crosses the Cheyenne River. South of the river, SD 44 enters Badlands National Park and bends to the east. The road continues east through the hills and plateaus of the Badlands, leaving Pennington County and entering Jackson County in the process. East of the county line, the highway bends to the northeast and enters Interior, where it meets the southern terminus of SD 377. SD 44 then leaves Interior and turns back to the east, and then to the south, leaving Badlands National Park and entering the Pine Ridge Indian Reservation by crossing the White River.

The highway continues due south through the reservation and then turns easterly. It curves to the north and goes through Wanblee before turning back to the east and intersecting SD 73. SD 44 treks east through rolling hills before crossing into Mellette County and leaving the reservation. Just east of the county line, the highway meets SD 63. It continues running east and crosses the Little White River before intersecting US 83 on the western edge of the city of White River, the county seat of Mellette County. The two highways run south for about two miles (3.2 km) before SD 44 splits off to the east.

East of US 83, SD 44 runs southeast through more rolling hills and journeys through Wood. East of Wood, the highway meets SD 53, and it and SD 53 run east, dipping southeast and crossing into Tripp County. In Tripp County, the highways turn south and then back to the east, forming the northern limit of Witten. East of Witten, SD 44 and SD 53 intersect US 183, and the three routes run south for about four miles (6.4 km) before meeting US 18. At this intersection, SD 53 splits to the west, while SD 44 turns east with US 18 and US 183.

The three routes run east toward Winner and enter the city from the northwest. In Winner, SD 44 breaks off from US 18 and US 183 and goes east, leaving the city. The road intersects SD 49 before leaving Tripp County for Gregory County. Just east of the county line lies SD 47, which SD 44 intersects and then heads farther east. The road starts to become more winding and hilly as it nears the Missouri River and Lake Francis Case. It intersects SD 1806 and then curves to the northeast and crosses the river into Charles Mix County.

East of the Missouri River, SD 44 is a much flatter road. It meets SD 50 and heads east concurrent with the route. About two miles (3.2 km) east of this intersection, the highways meet SD 1804, then continue east toward Platte. In Platte, they meet the southern terminus of SD 45. After leaving the city, SD 44 and SD 50 run together until the Douglas county line, where SD 50 turns south while SD 44 continues east into Douglas County.

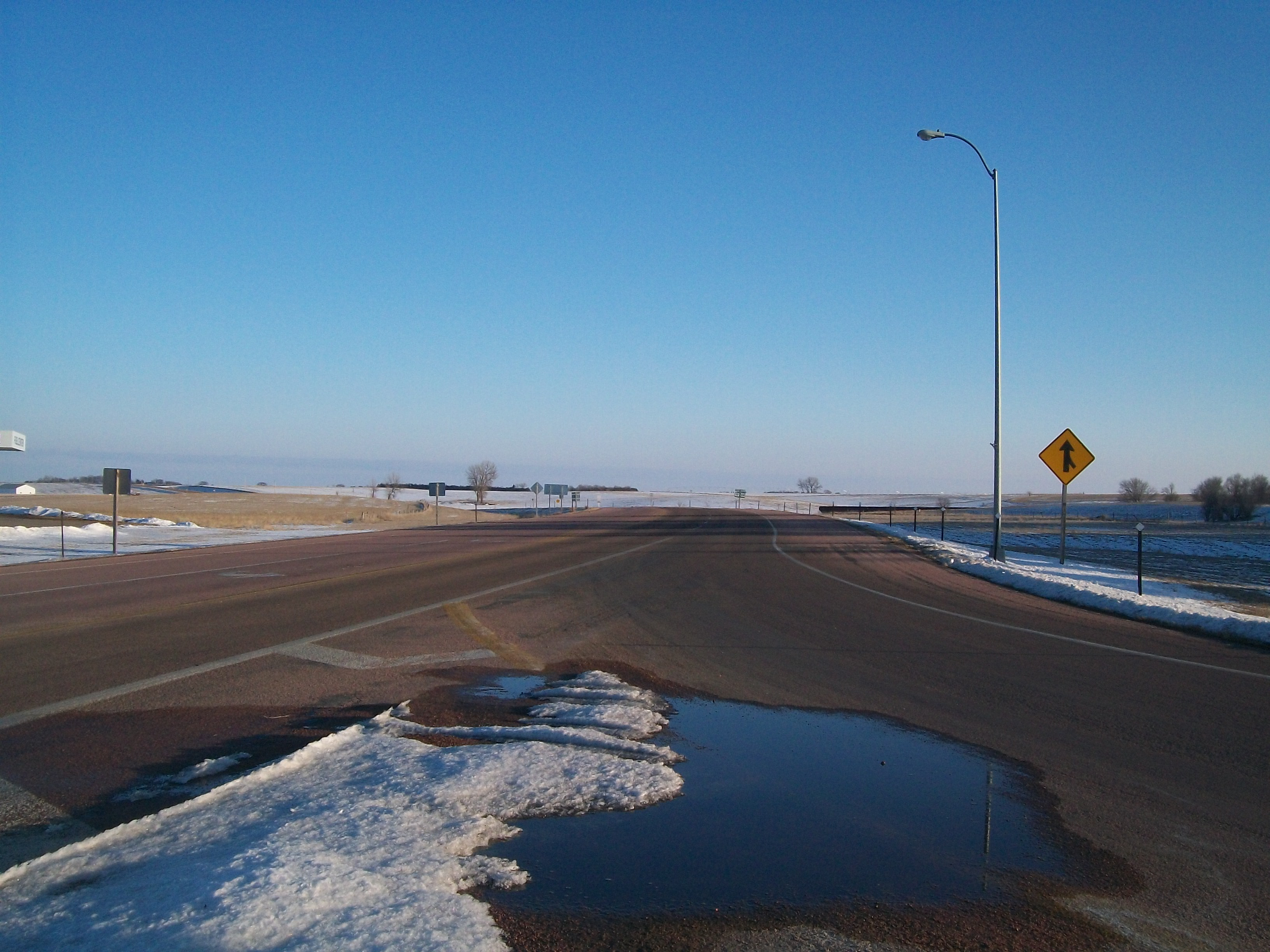
SD 44 overlaps SD 19 in Parker

In Douglas County, SD 44 heads east for about 15 miles (24 km) before it arrives at a junction with US 281 south of Corsica. It and US 281 run concurrent to the east for about three miles (4.8 km) before US 281 curves to the south and leaves SD 44, which runs east for about 12 miles (19 km) before entering Hutchinson County. Then, SD 44 reaches Parkston and intersects SD 37.

East of SD 37, SD 44 continues east, then curves slightly to the north and crosses the James River. East of the river, the highway crosses US 81 about one mile (1.6 km) before crossing into Turner County. In Turner County, SD 44 crosses the BNSF Railway and then the west fork of the Vermillion River. The route enters Parker and crosses the river again, then meets SD 19.

SD 44 and SD 19 run southeast together and leave Parker, then cross the BNSF Railway again. Later, SD 19 continues to run south and SD 44 turns to the east and passes over the east fork of the Vermillion River. Farther to the east, the highway enters Chancellor, where it bends in a southeasterly direction. It continues in this direction until it reaches the Lincoln county line, where it curves farther to the southeast toward Lennox.

The route enters the city and turns to the east toward a junction with the southern terminus SD 17. At the SD 17 intersection, SD 44 turns due south and leaves Lennox. It treks in this direction for about one mile (1.6 km) before turning to the east. The highway runs east through rural Lincoln County for about 4.5 miles (7.2 km) before coming to its eastern terminus, a diamond interchange at I-29.

== Major intersections ==
County	Location	mi	km	Destinations	Notes
Pennington		0.000	0.000	US 385 – Deadwood, Lead, Custer	Western terminus
Pennington	Rapid City	16.982	27.330	I-90 BL (West Main Street)	
Pennington	Rapid City	18.180	29.258	I-190 north / US 16 west to I-90	Southern terminus of I-190, western end of US 16 concurrency
Pennington	Rapid City	18.378	29.577	US 16 east (Mt Rushmore Road) – Mount Rushmore	Eastern end of US 16 concurrency
Pennington	Rapid City	18.912	30.436	I-90 BL (East Boulevard)	
Pennington	Rapid City	21.835– 22.091	35.140– 35.552	US 16 Truck / SD 79 to I-90 – Hot Springs	Folded diamond interchange
Jackson	Interior	91.505	147.263	SD 377 north – Badlands National Park	Southern terminus of SD 377
Jackson		127.270	204.821	SD 73 – Martin, Kadoka	
Mellette		143.480	230.909	SD 63 – Norris, Belvidere	
Mellette	White River	166.469	267.906	US 83 north – Murdo	Northern end of US 83 concurrency
Mellette		168.780	271.625	US 83 south – Mission	Southern end of US 83 concurrency
Mellette		188.158	302.811	SD 53 north to I-90	Western end of SD 53 concurrency
Tripp		207.897	334.578	US 183 north – Presho	Western end of US 183 concurrency
Tripp		211.890	341.004	US 18 west / SD 53 south – Mission	Western end of US 18 concurrency, eastern end of SD 53 concurrency
Tripp	Winner	221.206	355.997	US 18 east / US 183 south – Colome	Eastern end of US 18/US 183 concurrency
Tripp		229.245	368.934	SD 49 – Colome, Hamill	
Gregory		241.599	388.816	SD 47 to I-90 – Gregory	
Gregory		255.017	410.410	SD 1806 south	
Charles Mix		262.892	423.084	SD 50 west – Academy	Western end of SD 50 concurrency
Charles Mix		264.980	426.444	SD 1804 south	
Charles Mix	Platte	272.976	439.312	SD 45 north	Southern terminus of SD 45
Charles Mix		279.905	450.463	SD 50 east – Geddes	Eastern end of SD 50 concurrency
Douglas		295.000	474.756	US 281 north	Western end of US 281 concurrency
Douglas		297.981	479.554	US 281 south	Eastern end of US 281 concurrency
Hutchinson	Parkston	315.740	508.134	SD 37	
Hutchinson		345.035	555.280	US 81	
Turner	Parker	360.082	579.496	SD 19 north	Western end of SD 19 concurrency
Turner		362.977	584.155	SD 19 south	Eastern end of SD 19 concurrency
Lincoln	Lennox	373.468	601.038	SD 17 north	Southern terminus of SD 17
Lincoln		378.914– 379.022	609.803– 609.977	I-29 – Sioux Falls, Sioux City, IA	I-29 exit 64; eastern terminus.
1.000 mi = 1.609 km; 1.000 km = 0.621 mi: Concurrency terminus

== See also ==
- List of state highways in South Dakota
