= U.S. Route 18 in South Dakota =

Section of U.S. Highway in South Dakota, United States

U.S. Highway 18
- US 18 highlighted in red

Route information
- Maintained by SDDOT
- Length: 451.88 mi (727.23 km)
- Existed: 1926–present

Major junctions
- West end: US 18 at the Wyoming state line near Edgemont
- US 385 from Hot Springs to Oelrichs; US 83 in Mission; US 183 from Jordan Junction to Colome; US 281 from near Fairfax to near Armour; US 81 near Freeman; I-29 near Worthing
- East end: US 18 at the Iowa state line near Canton

Location
- Country: United States
- State: South Dakota
- Counties: Fall River, Oglala Lakota, Bennett, Todd, Tripp, Gregory, Charles Mix, Douglas, Hutchinson, Turner, Lincoln

Highway system
- United States Numbered Highway System; List; Special; Divided; South Dakota State Trunk Highway System; Interstate; US; State
← SD 17	→ SD 18

U.S. Highway 18 (US 18) is a part of the United States Numbered Highway System that travels from Orin, Wyoming, to Milwaukee, Wisconsin. In the state of South Dakota, US 18 runs from the Wyoming border east to the Iowa border. The highway runs parallel to the state's southern border with Nebraska, and at one point, near Fairfax, US 18 comes within one mile to the Nebraska border.

== Route description ==
US 18 enters South Dakota west of Edgemont. It passes through Hot Springs, the Pine Ridge Indian Reservation, the Rosebud Indian Reservation, Winner, and Gregory, before crossing the Missouri River near Pickstown over Fort Randall Dam. East of the Missouri River, US 18 passes through (or near) Lake Andes and Tripp before a brief concurrency with Interstate 29 (I-29) near Worthing. East of I-29, US 18 passes through Canton before crossing the Big Sioux River into Iowa.

The South Dakota section of US 18 is legally defined at South Dakota Codified Laws § 31-4-141.

== Major intersections ==
County	Location	mi	km	Destinations	Notes
Fall River		0.00	0.00	US 18 west – Lusk	Continuation into Wyoming
Fall River	Edgemont	12.10	19.47	SD 471 south – Edgemont, Provo	Northern terminus of SD 471
Fall River		24.18	38.91	SD 89 north – Custer	Southern terminus of SD 89
Fall River	Hot Springs	39.82	64.08	SD 71 south – Ardmore	Northern terminus of SD 71
Fall River	Hot Springs	40.54	65.24	US 385 north – Mount Rushmore, Wind Cave National Park	Western end of US 385 concurrency
Fall River	Maverick Junction	44.67	71.89	SD 79 north – Rapid City	Western end of SD 79 concurrency
Fall River	Oelrichs	62.27	100.21	US 385 south / SD 79 south – Chadron	Eastern end of US 385/SD 79 concurrency
Oglala Lakota	Pine Ridge	103.53	166.62	SD 407 south – Rushville	Northern terminus of SD 407
Oglala Lakota		120.99	194.71	SD 391 south – Gordon	Northern terminus of SD 391
Bennett	Martin	148.94	239.70	SD 73 south – Merriman	Western end of SD 73 concurrency
Bennett		161.42	259.78	SD 73 north – Kadoka	Eastern end of SD 73 concurrency
Todd		189.98	305.74	SD 63 north – Parmelee, Norris	Southern end of SD 63
Todd		206.35	332.09	US 83 north – White River	Western end of US 83 concurrency
Todd	Mission	209.69	337.46	US 83 south – Valentine	Eastern end of US 83 concurrency
Tripp		242.54	390.33	SD 53 south – Clearfield	Western end of SD 53 concurrency
Tripp	Jordan Junction	243.54	391.94	US 183 north / SD 44 west / SD 53 north – Presho	Western end of US 183/SD 44 concurrency; eastern end of SD 53 concurrency
Tripp	Winner	252.70	406.68	SD 44 east – Platte	Eastern end of SD 44 concurrency
Tripp	Colome	263.34	423.80	US 183 south / SD 49 north – Bassett	Eastern end of US 183 concurrency; Southern terminus of SD 49
Gregory	Gregory	277.92	447.27	SD 47 north / SD 251 south to I-90	Western end of SD 47 concurrency; Northern terminus of SD 251
Gregory	Burke	286.03	460.32	SD 47 south – Jamison	Eastern end of SD 47 concurrency
Gregory		305.22	491.20	SD 1806 north – Whetstone Bay	Southern terminus of SD 1806
Gregory		311.99	502.10	SD 43 south – Butte	Northern terminus of SD 43
Gregory		320.78	516.25	US 281 south – Spencer, O'Neill	Western end of US 281 concurrency
Charles Mix	Pickstown	332.90	535.75	SD 46 east (297th Street) – Wagner	Western terminus of SD 46
Charles Mix	Lake Andes	338.98	545.54	SD 50 west – Geddes, Platte	Western end of SD 50 concurrency
Charles Mix		348.90	561.50	SD 50 east – Wagner	Eastern end of SD 50 concurrency
Charles Mix		355.87	572.72	US 281 north – Armour	Eastern end of US 281 concurrency
Douglas	No major junctions				
Hutchinson		373.94	601.80	SD 37 – Tripp, Parkston	
Hutchinson		387.70	623.94	SD 25 south – Scotland	
Hutchinson		402.77	648.20	US 81 – Freeman, Yankton	
Turner		419.82	675.63	SD 19 south – Viborg	Western end of SD 19 concurrency
Turner		420.81	677.23	SD 19 north – Hurley	Eastern end of SD 19 concurrency
Lincoln	Lincoln–Lynn township line	435.23	700.43	I-29 south – Beresford	Western end of I-29 concurrency; I-29 exit 62
Lincoln	Lynn Township	438.25	705.30	I-29 north – Sioux Falls	Eastern end of I-29 concurrency; I-29 exit 59
Lincoln		441.72	710.88	SD 115 north / CR 121 south (474th Avenue) – Sioux Falls	Southern terminus of SD 115
Lincoln		445.71	717.30	SD 11 north (478th Avenue) – Sioux Falls	Western end of SD 11 concurrency
Lincoln		446.67	718.85	SD 11 south (479th Avenue) – Alcester	Eastern end of SD 11 concurrency
Lincoln	Canton Township	451.88	727.23	US 18 east – Inwood	Continuation into Iowa
1.000 mi = 1.609 km; 1.000 km = 0.621 mi: Concurrency terminus

== See also ==
U.S. Route 18
Previous state: Wyoming	South Dakota	Next state: Iowa
