= Wanblee, South Dakota =

Wanblee, South Dakota Waŋblí Hoȟpi
- Census-designated place
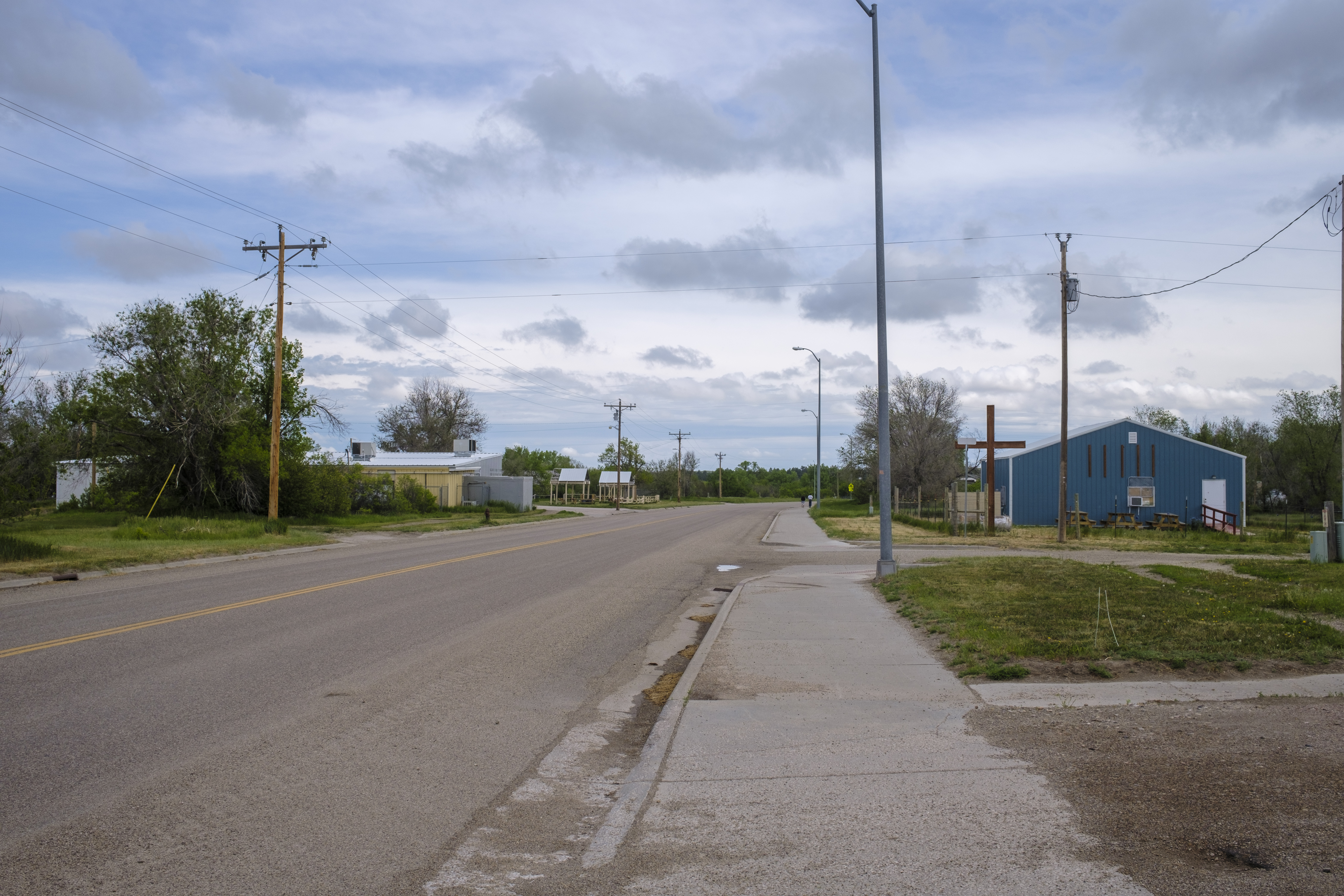

- Location in Jackson County and the state of South Dakota
- Coordinates: 43°34′14″N 101°39′41″W
- Country: United States
- State: South Dakota
- County: Jackson

Government
  - Type: Tribal

Area
  - Total: 2.02 sq mi (5.23 km^{2})
  - Land: 2.01 sq mi (5.21 km^{2})
  - Water: 0.0077 sq mi (0.02 km^{2})
- Elevation: 2,635 ft (803 m)

Population (2020)
  - Total: 674
  - Density: 334.8/sq mi (129.25/km^{2})
- Time zone: UTC-7 (Mountain (MST))
  - Summer (DST): UTC-6 (MDT)
- ZIP code: 57577
- Area code: 605
- FIPS code: 46-68580
- GNIS feature ID: 2393836

Wanblee (Lakota: Waŋblí Hoȟpi; "Golden Eagle Nest") is a census-designated place (CDP) on the Pine Ridge Indian Reservation, located in Jackson County, South Dakota, United States. The population was 674 at the 2020 census, virtually all of whom are members of the Oglala tribe of Lakota Sioux. Wanbli is the Lakota word for eagle, and the town was named for its proximity to Wanbli hohpi paha (Eagle Nest Butte). Wanblee is a few miles directly northeast of the North American continental pole of inaccessibility.

The 1992 movie Thunderheart was partly filmed in Wanblee. It appeared as an unnamed town on the fictional Bear Creek Reservation, for which is actually located on the Pine Ridge Indian Reservation.

== Geography ==
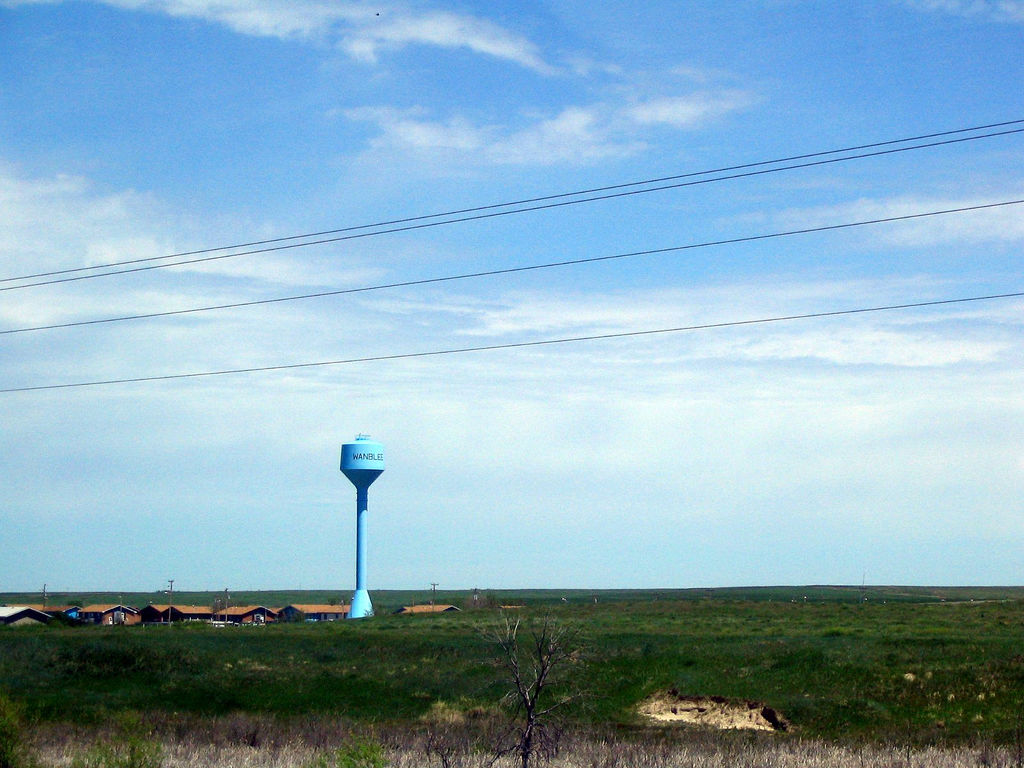
Wanblee, including the town's water tower and some homes

Wanblee is located in south-central Jackson County and South Dakota Highway 44 passes through the community, leading east 47 miles (76 km) to White River and northwest 28 miles (45 km) to Interior. Kadoka is 28 miles (45 km) to the northeast via Highways 44 and 73.

According to the United States Census Bureau, the Wanblee CDP has a total area of 2.2 square miles (5.6 km^{2}), of which 0.01 square miles (0.02 km^{2}), or 0.31%, are water. Craven Creek runs through the west side of the community, leading north to the White River.

== Demographics ==
Historical population
Census	Pop.	Note	%±
2020	674		—
U.S. Decennial Census

As of the census of 2000, there were 641 people, 132 households, and 107 families residing in the CDP. The population density was 287.0 inhabitants per square mile (110.8/km^{2}). There were 144 housing units at an average density of 64.5 per square mile (24.9/km^{2}). The racial makeup of Wanblee was 97.19% Native American, 2.34% White, and 0.47% from two or more races.

There were 132 households, out of which 50.8% had children under the age of 18 living with them, 32.6% were married couples living together, 35.6% had a female householder with no husband present, and 18.9% were non-families. 18.2% of all households were made up of individuals, and 6.8% had someone living alone who was 65 years of age or older. The average household size was 4.86 and the average family size was 5.35.

In the CDP, the population was spread out, with 47.6% under the age of 18, 12.5% from 18 to 24, 21.8% from 25 to 44, 13.4% from 45 to 64, and 4.7% who were 65 years of age or older. The median age was 19 years. For every 100 females, there were 96.6 males. For every 100 females age 18 and over, there were 96.5 males.

About 68.9% of families and 72.3% of the population were below the poverty line, including 72.9% of those under age 18 and 86.2% of those age 65 or over. The per capita income in Wanblee was $4,584. The median income for a household was $14,286, and the median income for a family was $14,844. Males had a median income of $18,750 versus $17,917 for females.
