= South Dakota Highway 17 =

State highway in Lincoln and Minnehaha counties in South Dakota, United States

Highway 17

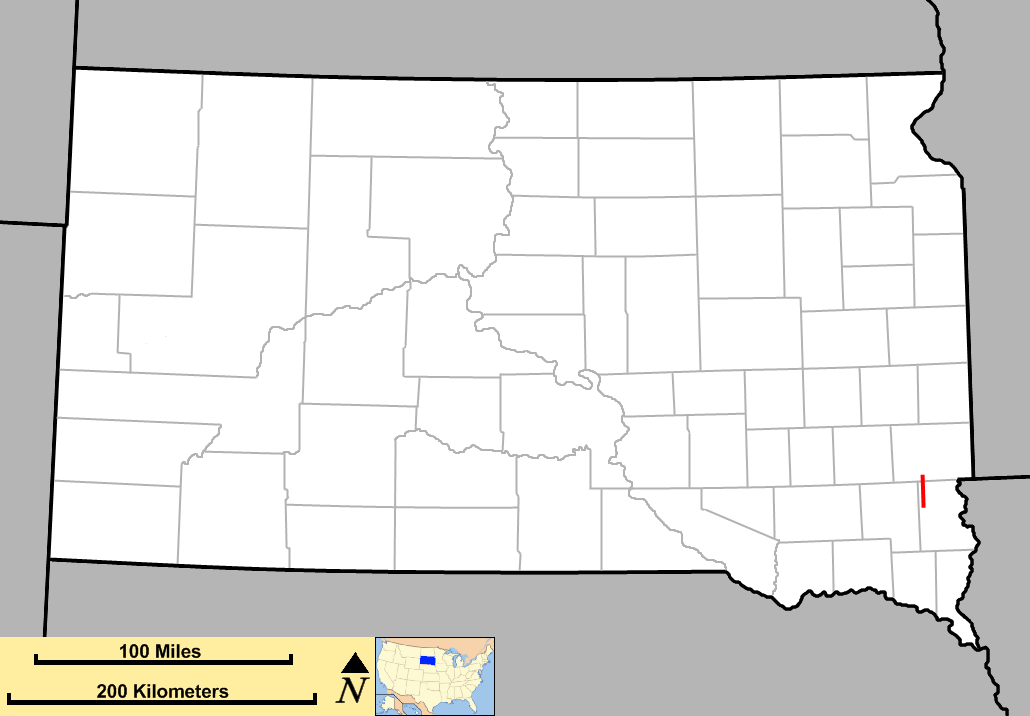
- Map of South Dakota with SD 17 in red

Route information
- Maintained by SDDOT
- Length: 1.006 mi (1.619 km)

Major junctions
- South end: SD 44 at Lennox
- North end: 278th Street at Lennox

Location
- Country: United States
- State: South Dakota
- Counties: Lincoln

Highway system
- South Dakota State Trunk Highway System; Interstate; US; State
← SD 16	→ US 18

South Dakota Highway 17 (SD 17) is a 1-mile-long (1.6 km) state highway in southeastern South Dakota, United States. It runs along the eastern edge of Lennox. SD 17 formerly continued south to what is now SD 46 near Centerville, and north to SD 42 west of Sioux Falls.

== Route description ==
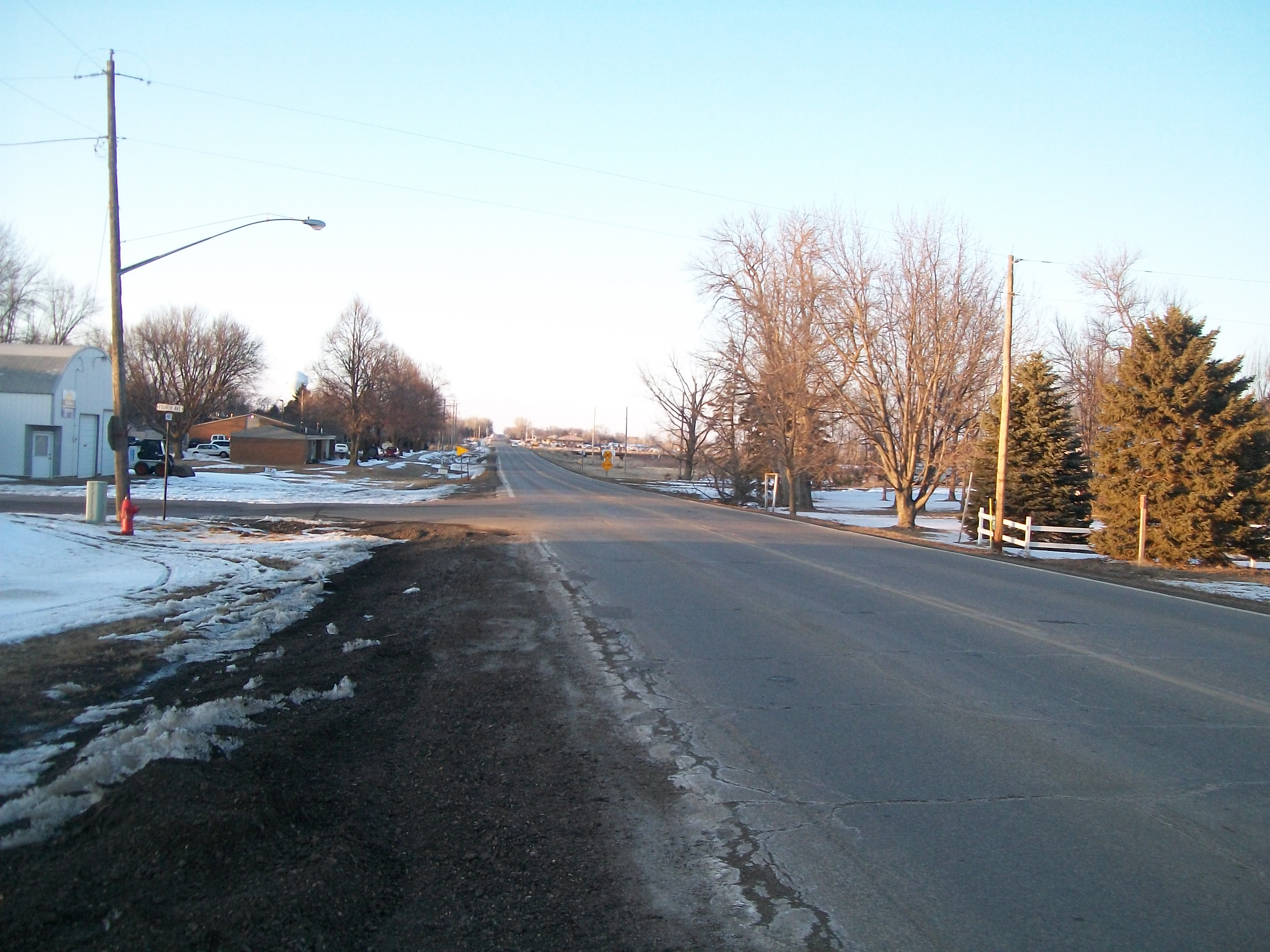
SD 17 just north of its southern terminus in Lennox, March 2013

SD begins at the intersection with SD 44 in southeastern Lennox, in the west-central part of Lincoln County. It travels north along the eastern corporate limit of the town for one mile (1.6 km). It ends at the intersection with 278th Street at the northeastern corner of the Lennox corporate limits.

== History ==
The original SD 17 was established in 1926, from west of Milbank to Peever. This became part of SD 15 by 1929 when it extended north. The current SD 17 was established by 1929. It originally began at an intersection with what is now SD 46 near Centerville. This segment was decommissioned in the 1990s.

In 2018, the South Dakota State Legislature removed the portion of SD 17 that ran from its current northern terminus up to SD 42 from the state highway system and turned it over to local control.

== Major intersections ==
The entire route is in Lennox, Lincoln County.

mi	km	Destinations	Notes
0.000	0.000	SD 44 – US 18, Chancellor	
1.006	1.619	Boynton Avenue (278th Street)	Roadway continues as 466th Avenue
1.000 mi = 1.609 km; 1.000 km = 0.621 mi
