= South Dakota Highway 49 =

State highway in South Dakota, United States

Highway 49

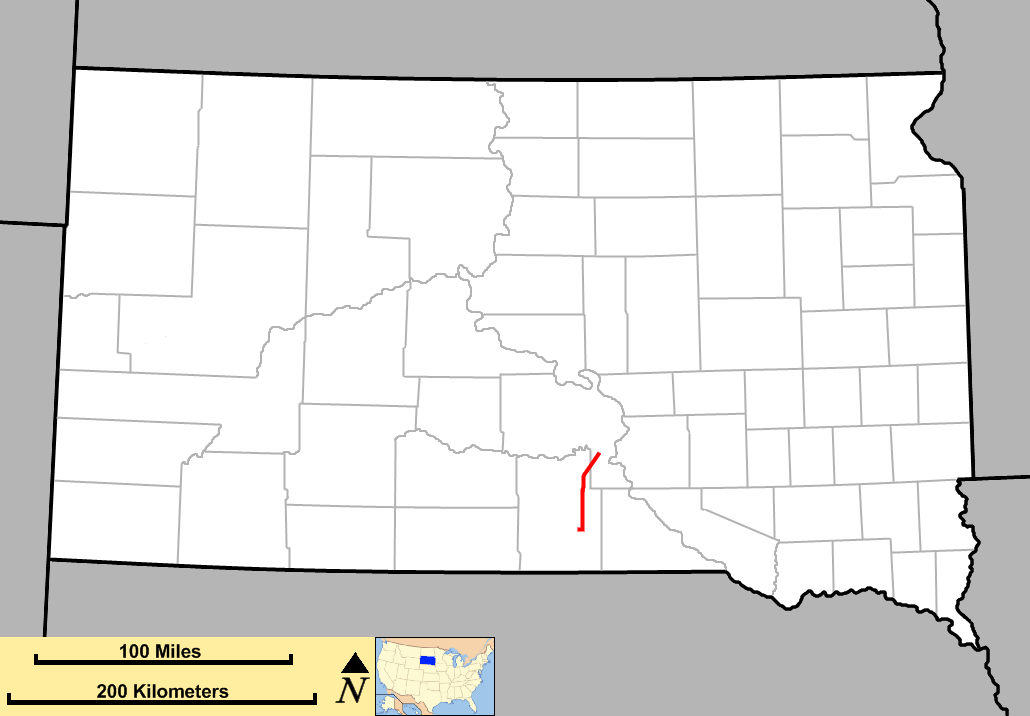
- Route of SD 49 (in red)

Route information
- Maintained by SDDOT
- Length: 35.134 mi (56.543 km)
- Existed: 1976–present

Major junctions
- South end: US 18 / US 183 in Colome
- North end: SD 47 near White River

Location
- Country: United States
- State: South Dakota
- Counties: Tripp, Lyman

Highway system
- South Dakota State Trunk Highway System; Interstate; US; State
← SD 48	→ SD 50

South Dakota Highway 49 (SD 49) is a 35.134-mile (56.543 km) long state route that runs north to south in south-central South Dakota. It begins at a junction with South Dakota Highway 47 just south of the White River, and terminates at the junction of U.S. Highway 18 and U.S. Highway 183 in Colome.

== History ==
The road currently known as South Dakota 49 first received a number in the late 1960s, when South Dakota Highway 147 was established as a branch off South Dakota 47. This branch extended from the junction near the White River to Hamill. In 1976, the route was designated as South Dakota 49, with the number extended to the junction with South Dakota Highway 44. In 1984, the route was further extended to Colome, at the junction of U.S. 18 and U.S. 183.

== Major intersections ==
County	Location	mi	km	Destinations	Notes
Tripp	Colome	0.000	0.000	US 18 / US 183	
Tripp		9.466	15.234	SD 44	
Lyman		35.134	56.543	SD 47	
1.000 mi = 1.609 km; 1.000 km = 0.621 mi
