= Jordan Junction, South Dakota =

- Unincorporated community
- Location within South Dakota
- Coordinates: 43°23′06″N 100°01′45″W
- Country: United States
- State: South Dakota
- County: Tripp
- Elevation: 2,028 ft (618 m)
- Time zone: UTC-6 (Central (CST))
  - Summer (DST): UTC-5 (CDT)
- Area code: 605
- GNIS feature ID: 1255885

Jordan Junction is an unincorporated community in Tripp County, South Dakota, United States. Jordan Junction is located at the intersection of U.S. Route 18, U.S. Route 183, South Dakota Highway 44, and South Dakota Highway 53, west of Winner.
