= Badlands National Park =

National park in South Dakota, United States

- IUCN category II (national park)
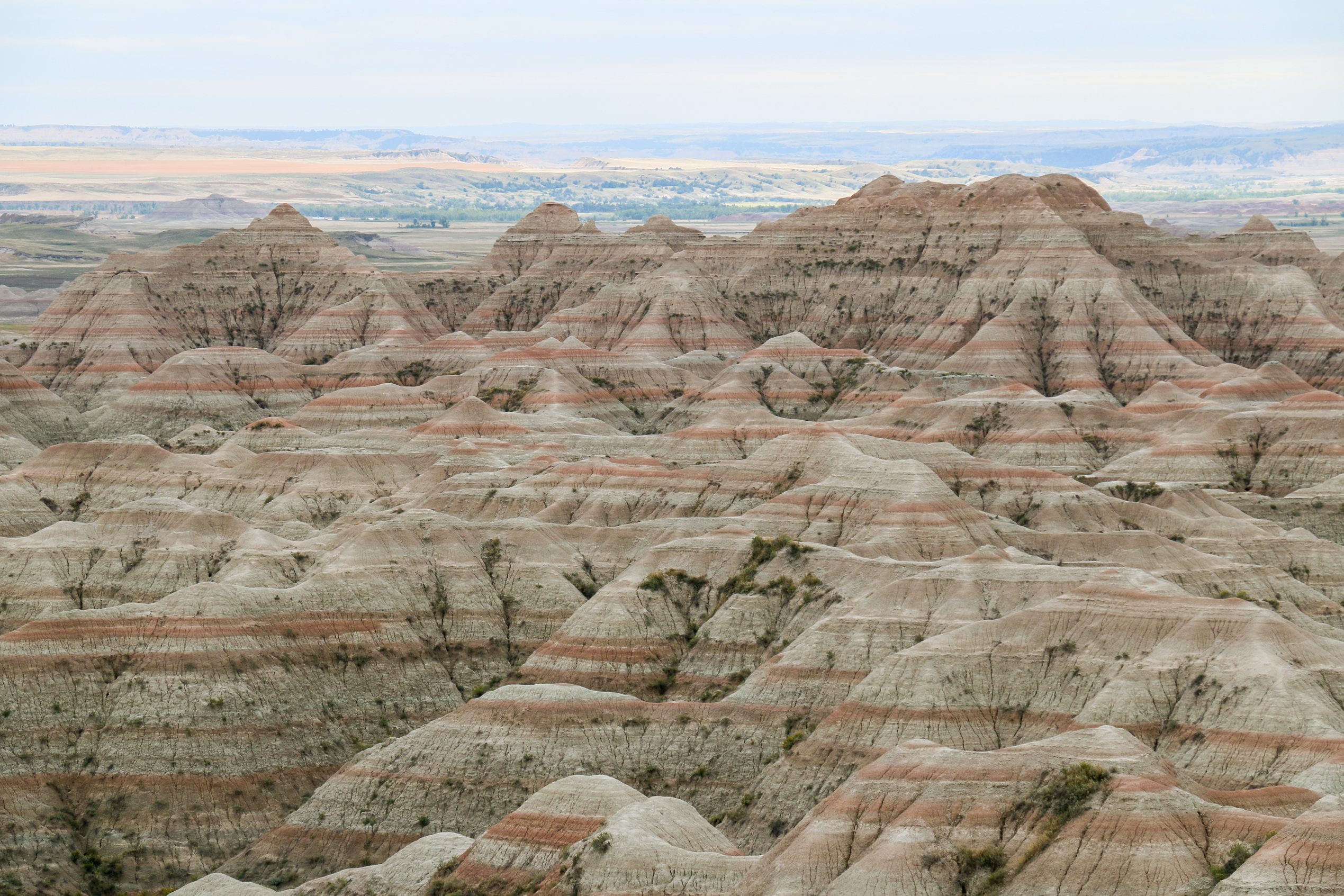
- Badlands National Park

- Location within South Dakota Location within the United States
- Interactive map of Badlands National Park
- Location: Jackson, Oglala Lakota, and Pennington counties, South Dakota, United States
- Nearest city: Rapid City, South Dakota
- Coordinates: 43°45′N 102°30′W
- Area: 242,756 acres (982.40 km^{2})
- Established: January 25, 1939; 87 years ago as a national monument November 10, 1978; 48 years ago as a national park
- Visitors: 1,006,809 (in 2022)
- Governing body: National Park Service
- Website: nps.gov/badl

Badlands National Park (Lakota: Makȟóšiča) is a national park of the United States in southwestern South Dakota. The park protects 242,756 acres (379.3 sq mi; 982.4 km^{2}) of sharply eroded buttes and pinnacles, along with the largest undisturbed mixed grass prairie in the United States. The National Park Service manages the park, with the South Unit being co-managed with the Oglala Lakota tribe.

Located within the White River drainage, the Badlands Wilderness protects 64,144 acres (100.2 sq mi; 259.6 km^{2}) of the park's North Unit as a designated wilderness area, and is one site where the black-footed ferret, one of the most endangered mammals in the world, was reintroduced to the wild. The South Unit, or Stronghold District, includes sites of 1890s Ghost Dances, a former United States Air Force bomb and gunnery range, and Red Shirt Table, the park's highest point at 3,340 feet (1,020 m).

Authorized as Badlands National Monument on March 4, 1929, it was not established until January 25, 1939. Badlands was redesignated a national park on November 10, 1978. Under the Mission 66 plan, the Ben Reifel Visitor Center was constructed for the monument in 1957–58. The park also administers the nearby Minuteman Missile National Historic Site. The movies Dances with Wolves (1990) and Thunderheart (1992) were partially filmed in Badlands National Park.

This national park was originally a reservation of the Oglala Sioux Indians and spans the southern unit of the park. The area around Stronghold Table was originally Sioux territory, and is revered as a ceremonial sacred site rather than a place to live.

In 1868, at the Second Treaty of Fort Laramie, the United States assured the Sioux that the Badlands shall forever be the property of the Sioux. In 1889, however, the treaty was broken and the Badlands were confiscated by the United States.

At the end of the 19th century, the Sioux Indians used this area as the site of the Ghost Dance, a ceremony to revive the souls of buffalo and the dead. After the last ghost dance in 1890, the United States banned the ritual, but it was revived by the Red Power movement, a movement to restore Indian rights that began in the 1960s. In 1980, the U.S. Supreme Court awarded compensation to the Sioux for the abrogation of the 1868 treaty, but the Sioux did not accept the money.

== History ==
=== Native Americans ===
For 11,000 years, Native Americans have used this area for their hunting grounds. Long before the Lakota were the paleo-Indians, followed by the Arikara people. Their descendants live today in North Dakota as a part of the Three Affiliated Tribes. Archaeological records combined with oral traditions indicate that these people camped in secluded valleys where fresh water and game were available year-round. Eroding out of the stream banks today are the rocks and charcoal of their campfires, as well as the arrowheads and tools they used to butcher bison, rabbits, and other game. From the top of the Badlands Wall, they could scan the area for enemies and wandering herds. If hunting was good, they might hang on into winter, before retracing their way to their villages along the Missouri River. The Lakota people were the first to call this place makȟóšiča, which breaks down to makȟá ("land") + o- (attributive suffix) + šíča "bad", or literally "bad lands". Extreme temperatures, lack of water, and the exposed rugged terrain led to this name. French-Canadian fur trappers called it "les mauvaises terres pour traverser", or "bad lands to travel through". By one hundred and fifty years ago, the Lakota Nation consisting of seven tribes including the Oglala Lakota, had displaced the other tribes from the northern prairie.

The next great change came toward the end of the 19th century as homesteaders moved into South Dakota. The U.S. government stripped Native Americans of much of their territory and forced them to live on reservations. In the fall and early winter of 1890, thousands of Native Americans, including many Oglala Sioux, became followers of the Indian prophet Wovoka. His vision called for the native people to dance the Ghost Dance and wear Ghost shirts, which would be impervious to bullets. Wovoka had predicted that the white man would vanish and their hunting grounds would be restored. One of the last known Ghost Dances was conducted on Stronghold Table in the South Unit of Badlands National Park. As winter closed in, the ghost dancers returned to Pine Ridge Agency. The climax of the struggle came in late December 1890. Headed south from the Cheyenne River, a band of Minneconjou Sioux crossed a pass in the Badlands Wall. Pursued by units of the U.S. Army, they were seeking refuge in the Pine Ridge Reservation. The band, led by Chief Spotted Elk, was finally overtaken by the soldiers near Wounded Knee Creek in the Reservation and ordered to camp there overnight. The troops attempted to disarm Big Foot's band the next morning. Gunfire erupted. Before it was over, nearly three hundred Indians and thirty soldiers lay dead. The Wounded Knee Massacre was the last major clash between Plains Indians and the U.S. military until the advent of the American Indian Movement in the 1970s, most notably in the 1973 standoff at Wounded Knee, South Dakota.

Wounded Knee is located approximately 45 miles (72 km) south of the park on Pine Ridge Reservation. The U.S. government and the Oglala Lakota Nation have agreed that this is a story to be told by the Oglala of Pine Ridge and Minneconjou of Standing Rock Reservation. The interpretation of the site and its tragic events are held as the primary responsibility of these survivors.

=== Fossil record ===
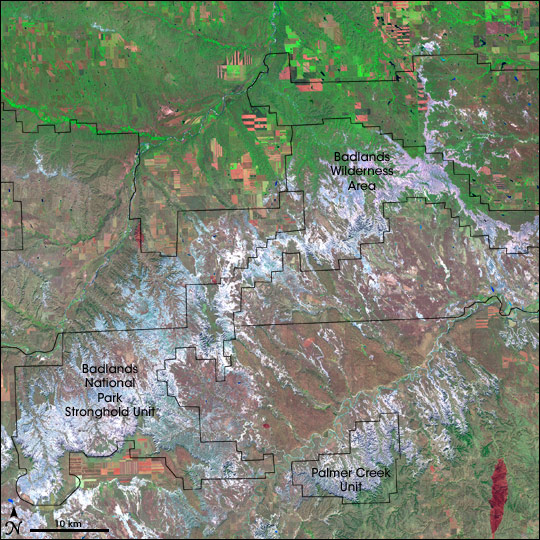
False-color satellite image of the park

The history of the White River Badlands as a significant paleontological resource goes back to the traditional Native American knowledge of the area. The Lakota found large fossilized bones, fossilized seashells and turtle shells. They correctly assumed that the area had once been under water, and that the bones belonged to creatures which no longer existed. Paleontological interest in this area began in the 1840s. Trappers and traders regularly traveled the 300 miles (480 km) from Fort Pierre to Fort Laramie along a path which skirted the edge of what is now Badlands National Park. Fossils were occasionally collected, and in 1843 a fossilized jaw fragment collected by Alexander Culbertson of the American Fur Company found its way to a physician in St. Louis by the name of Hiram A. Prout.

In 1846, Prout published a paper about the jaw in the American Journal of Science in which he stated that it had come from a creature he called a Paleotherium. Shortly after the publication, the White River Badlands became popular fossil hunting grounds and, within a couple of decades, numerous new fossil species had been discovered in the White River Badlands. In 1849, Dr. Joseph Leidy published a paper on an Oligocene camel and renamed Prout's Paleotherium, Titanotherium prouti. By 1854 when he published a series of papers about North American fossils, 84 distinct species had been discovered in North America – 77 of which were found in the White River Badlands. In 1870 a Yale professor, O. C. Marsh, visited the region and developed more refined methods of extracting and reassembling fossils into nearly complete skeletons. From 1899 to today, the South Dakota School of Mines has sent people almost every year and remains one of the most active research institutions working in the White River Badlands. Throughout the late 19th century and continuing today, scientists and institutions from all over the world have benefited from the fossil resources of the White River Badlands. The White River Badlands have developed an international reputation as a fossil-rich area. They contain the richest deposits of Oligocene mammals known, providing a glimpse of life in the area 33 million years ago.

==== List of fossil animals ====
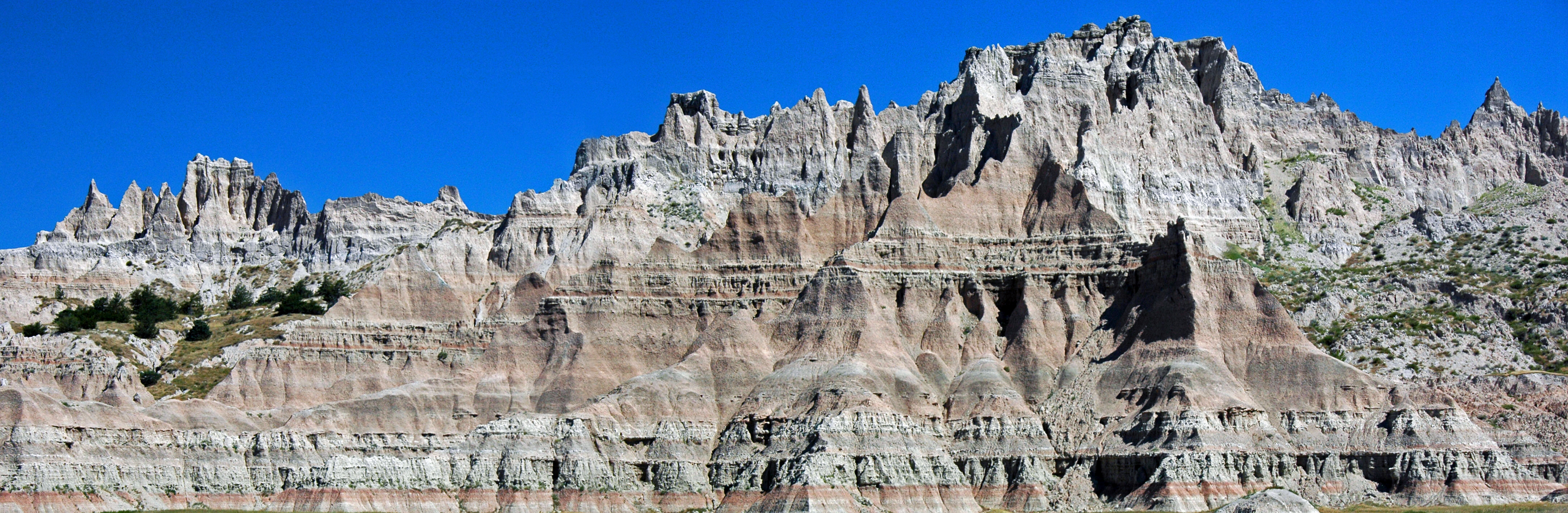
Sedimentary striations in White River Badlands

- Alligator (Crocodilian)
- Archaeotherium (Entelodont)
- Dinictis (Nimravid)
- Eporeodon (Oreodont)
- Eusmilus (Nimravid)
- Hoplophoneus (Nimravid)
- Hyaenodon (Creodont)
- Hyracodon (Running rhino)
- Ischyromys (Ground squirrel-like rodent)
- Leptomeryx (Tragulid)
- Merycoidodon (Oreodont)
- Mesohippus (Horse)
- Metamynodon (Aquatic rhino)
- Miniochoerus (Oreodont)
- Poebrotherium (Camel)
- Subhyracodon (Rhinoceros)

=== Homesteading ===
American homesteading began before the end of the American Civil War, but it did not reach the Badlands until the 20th century. Farmers then came to South Dakota from Europe and the eastern United States, hoping to make a living in the area. In 1929 the South Dakota Department of Agriculture published an advertisement to attract settlers, a map that called the Badlands "The Wonderlands" and promised "...marvelous scenic and recreational advantages". The standard homestead was 160 acres (0.3 sq mi; 0.6 km^{2}), which in the semi-arid, wind-swept environment was far too little to support a family. In 1916, in the western Dakotas, the size of a homestead was increased to 640 acres (1.0 sq mi; 2.6 km^{2}). Cattle grazed the land, and crops such as winter wheat and hay were cut annually. The Dust Bowl of the 1930s drove out most of the Badlands settlers, and the houses they had built of sod blocks were abandoned.

=== Military use of Stronghold District ===
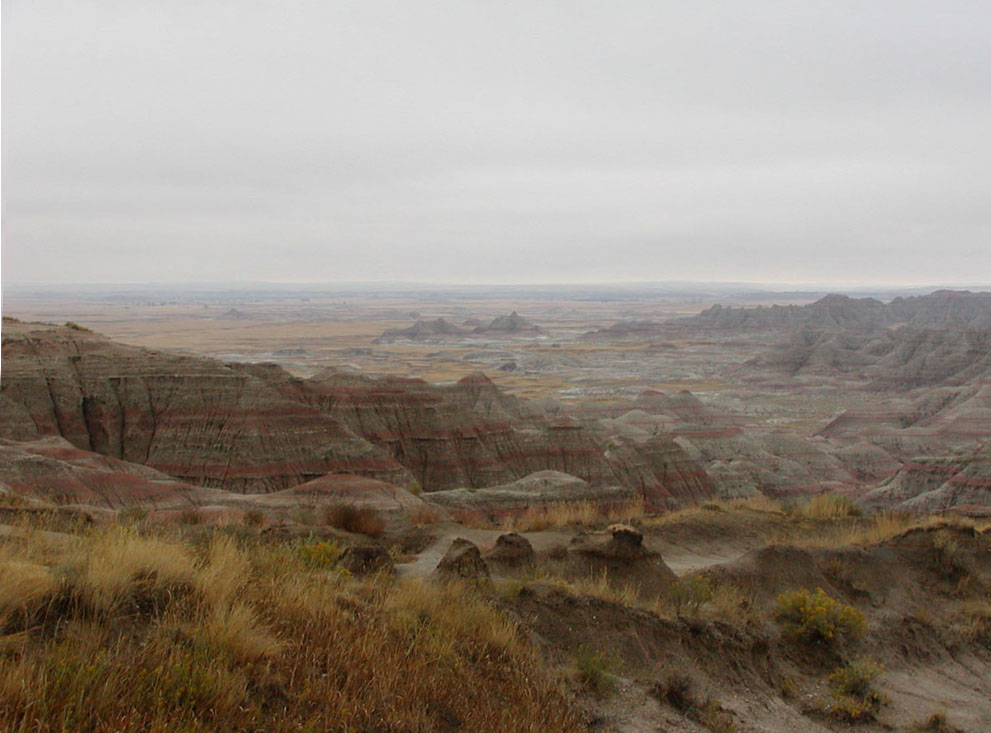
Badlands in the northern portion of Pine Ridge Indian Reservation

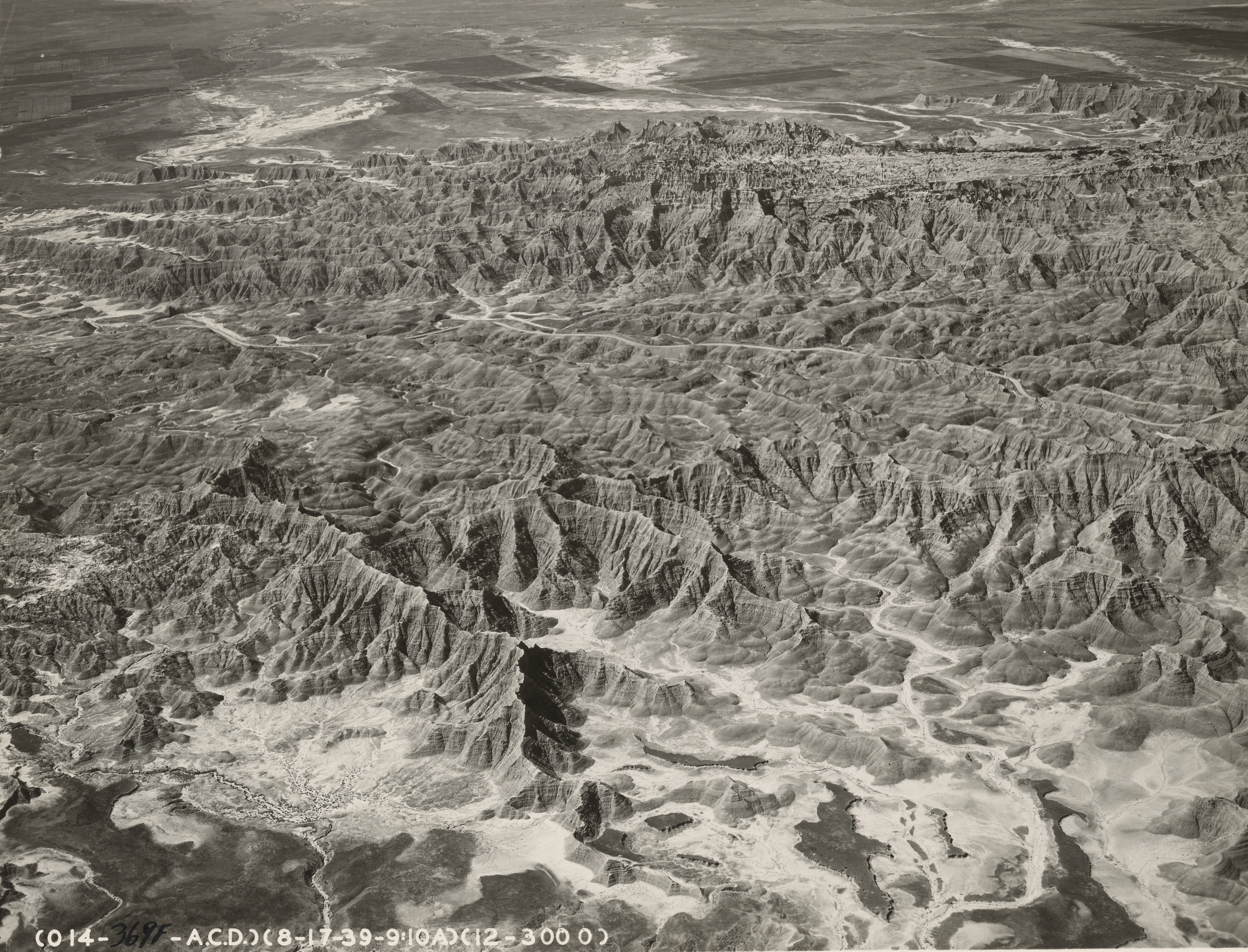
Badlands in 1939 (45 miles southeast of Rapid City)

As part of the World War II effort, the U.S. Army Air Force (USAAF) took possession of 341,726 acres (533.9 sq mi; 1,382.9 km^{2}) of land on the Pine Ridge Indian Reservation, home of the Oglala Sioux people, for a gunnery range. Included in this range was 337 acres (0.5 sq mi; 1.4 km^{2}) from the Badlands National Monument. This land was used extensively from 1942 through 1945 as an air-to-air and air-to-ground gunnery range including both precision and demolition bombing exercises. After the war, portions of the bombing range were used as an artillery range by the South Dakota National Guard. In 1968, most of the range was declared excess property by the USAF. Although 2,500 acres (3.9 sq mi; 10.1 km^{2}) were retained by the USAF (but are no longer used) the majority of the land was turned over to the National Park Service.

Firing took place within most of the present-day Stronghold District. Land was bought or leased from individual landowners and the Tribe in order to clear the area of human occupation. Old car bodies and 55 gallon drums painted bright yellow were used as targets. Bulls-eyes 250 feet (76 m) across were plowed into the ground and used as targets by bombardiers. Small automatic aircraft called "target drones" and 60-by-8-foot (18 by 2 m) screens dragged behind planes served as mobile targets. Today, the ground is littered with discarded bullet cases and unexploded ordnance.

In the 1940s, 125 families were forcibly relocated from their farms and ranches, including Dewey Beard, a survivor of the Wounded Knee Massacre. Those that remained nearby recall times when they had to dive under tractors while out cutting hay to avoid bombs dropped by planes miles outside of the boundary. In the town of Interior, both a church and the building housing the current post office were struck by six inch (152 mm) shells through the roof. Pilots operating out of Ellsworth Air Force Base near Rapid City found it a real challenge to determine the exact boundaries of the range. There were no civilian casualties. However, at least a dozen flight crew personnel lost their lives in plane crashes.

The Stronghold District, also known as the South Unit of Badlands National Park, consists of lands on the Pine Ridge Indian Reservation owned by the Oglala Sioux Tribe and managed by the National Park Service under an agreement with the Tribe. The land is a 133,300-acre (208.3 sq mi; 539.4 km^{2}) area. Deep draws, high tables and rolling prairie are characteristic of these lands occupied by the earliest plains hunters, the paleo-Indians, and the Lakota Nation.

== Legislative and administrative history ==
On March 4, 1929, his final day in office, President Calvin Coolidge signed Public Law No. 1021. This bill authorized creation of the Badlands National Monument in South Dakota. The legislation's conditions for eventual proclamation included the acquisition of privately owned land within the proposed boundaries of the monument and the construction of a 30-mile highway through the park. The Badlands National Monument became the seventy-seventh monument within the National Park Service a decade after its original authorization, when President Franklin D. Roosevelt signed the enacting proclamation on January 24. 1939. The 10-year period, 1929–1939, to create the park matched the period of time that Mount Rushmore National Memorial was being blasted and sculptured; the Badlands work was part of a comprehensive federal drive to develop western South Dakota for tourism. The monument was renamed "Badlands National Park" in 1978.

The Badlands National Monument was established in order to preserve the natural scenery and educational resources within its boundaries. The bill authorized specific scientific and educational institutions to excavate within the monument in the pursuit of educational, geological, and zoological observation. The bill includes a portion highlighting the potential for fossil excavation in the monument's geological formations.

Badlands National Park Superintendents

1. John E. Suter (1949–1953)
2. John A. Rutter (1953–1957)
3. George H. Sholly (1958–1959)
4. Frank E. Sylvester (1960–1960)
5. John W. Jay (1960–1962)
6. Frank A. Hjort (1963–1967)
7. John R. Earnst (1967–1970)
8. Cecil D. Lewis, JR (1970–1974)
9. James E. Jones (1974–1979)
10. Gilbert E. Blinn (1979–1985)
11. James L. Monheiser (1985–1985)
12. Donald A. Falvey (1985–1987)
13. Lloyd P. Kortge (1987–1987)
14. Irvin L. Mortenson (1987–1996)
15. Bill Supernaugh (1997–2004)
16. Paige Baker (2005–2010)
17. Eric Brunnemann (2010–2015)
18. Mike Pflaum (2015–2021)
19. Eric Veach (2022–Present)

== Geology ==
Eroded walls of layered sediment in Badlands National Park, South Dakota, 2026

The rocks of Badlands National Park were deposited over roughly the past 75 million years, and erosion has since cut them into the buttes, walls, and pinnacles that give the park its name. The exposed rock records the change from an ancient inland sea to river floodplains.

The oldest rocks in the park formed from sediment deposited about 75 million years ago in the Western Interior Seaway, a shallow inland sea that reached from the Gulf of Mexico to the Arctic Ocean. These dark marine muds make up the Pierre Shale, which contains fossils of marine animals such as ammonites and mosasaurs. As the Rocky Mountains rose and shed sediment eastward, the seaway slowly drained away, and it was gone by the time of the mass extinction about 65 million years ago, leaving dry land behind.

The badlands are eroded from the White River Group, a sequence of river and floodplain sediments deposited between about 37 and 23 million years ago. A deeply weathered soil that formed on the older marine rocks, now exposed as the colorful Yellow Mounds, lies between the two. From oldest to youngest the group is made up of the Chamberlain Pass and Chadron formations (late Eocene), the Brule Formation (Oligocene, deposited about 32 to 26 million years ago), and the Sharps Formation (latest Oligocene), which caps the park's highest peaks. Ash from repeated volcanic eruptions in the present-day Great Basin is preserved through the upper beds.

Deposition ended in the early Miocene, and erosion has shaped the area for roughly the past two million years as the land slowly rose. The loose White River sediments soak up little rainfall, so brief, heavy summer thunderstorms strip the soft rock away quickly, by as much as an inch (about 2.5 cm) a year in bare areas. The badlands are geologically young and still actively eroding.

== Wildlife ==
Animals that inhabit the park include: badger, bighorn sheep, bison, black-billed magpie, black-footed ferret, black-tailed prairie dog, bobcat, coyote, elk, mule deer, pronghorn, prairie rattlesnake, porcupine, whooping crane, swift fox, and white-tailed deer.

Wildlife in the park

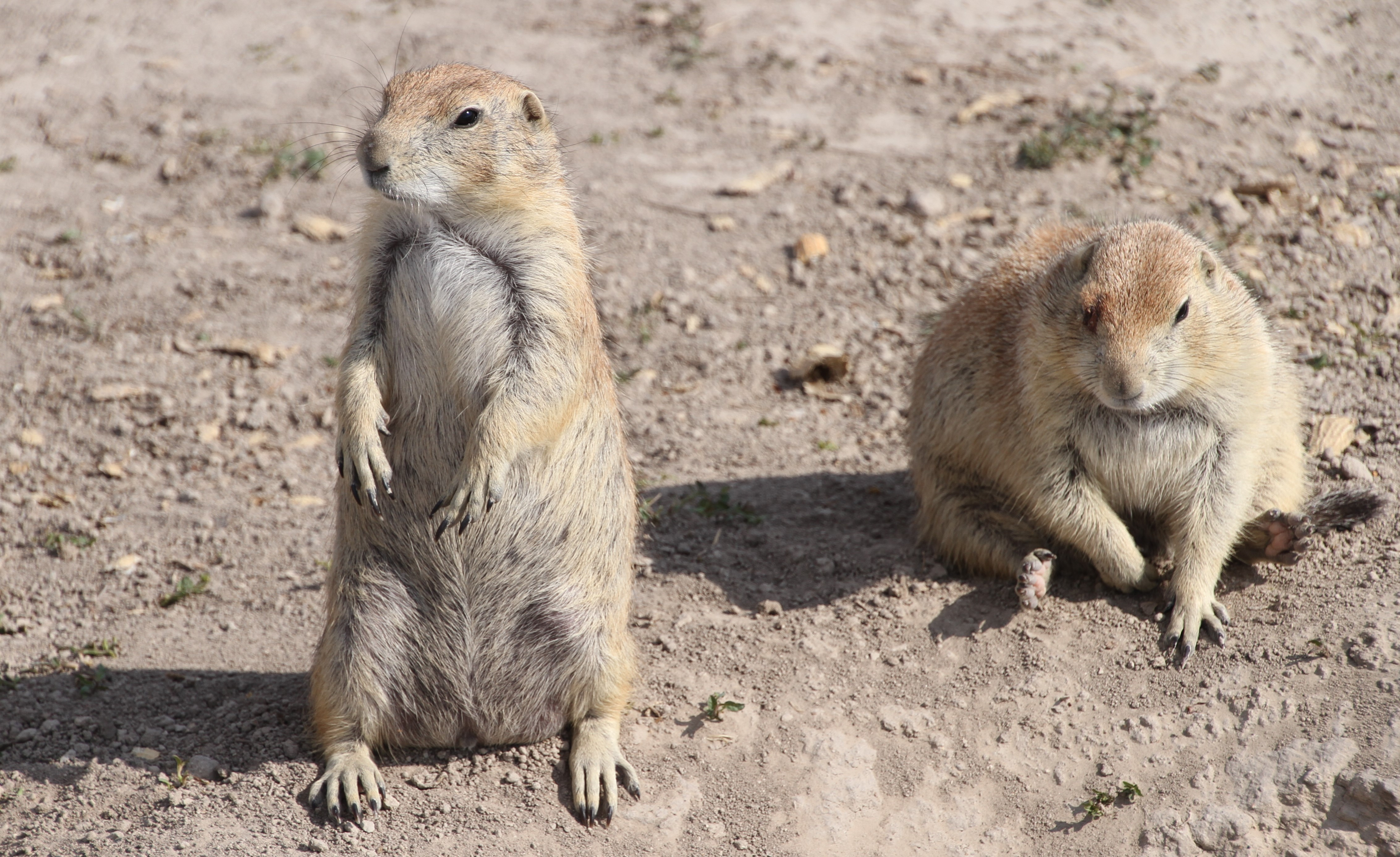
Prairie dogs

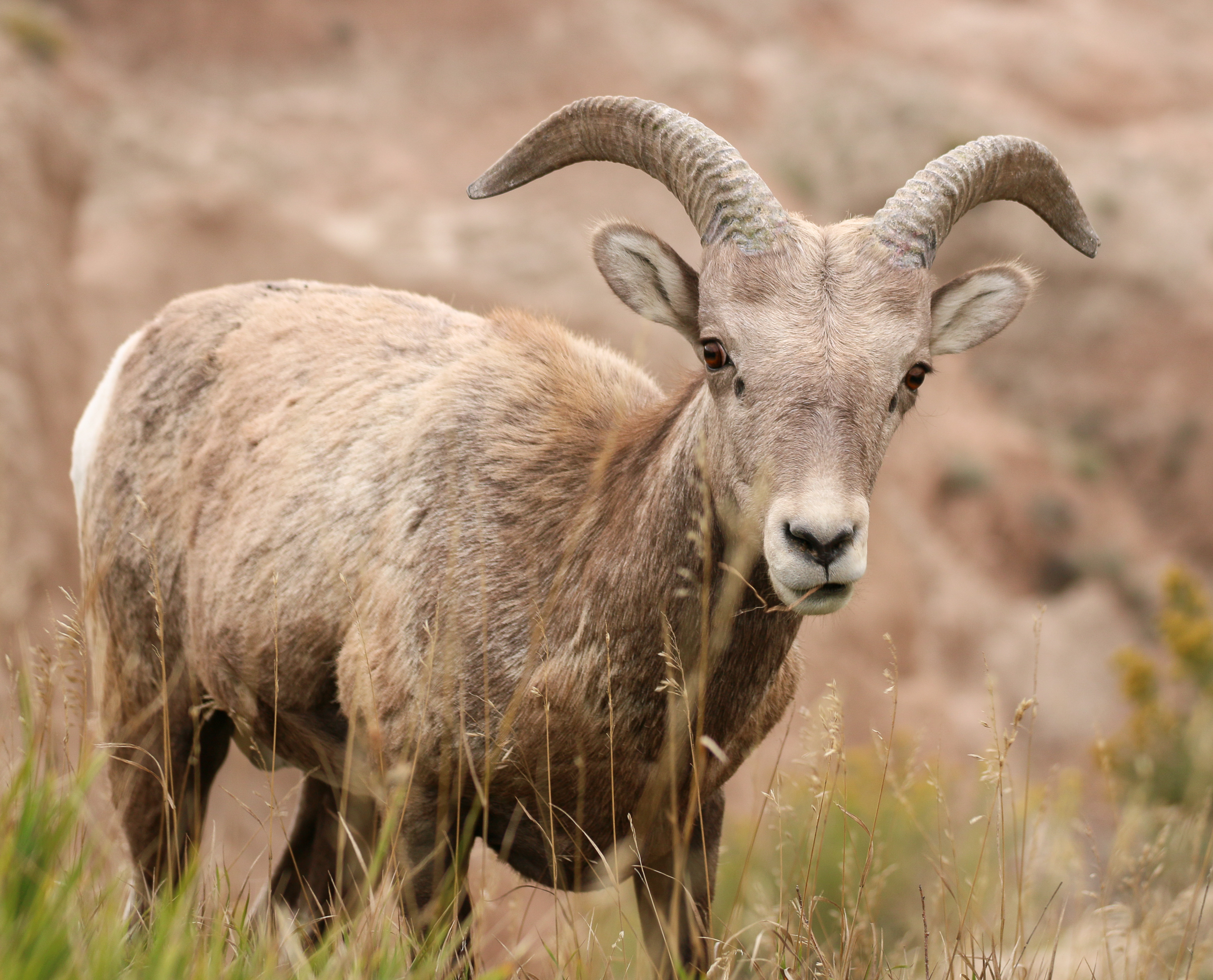
Bighorn sheep

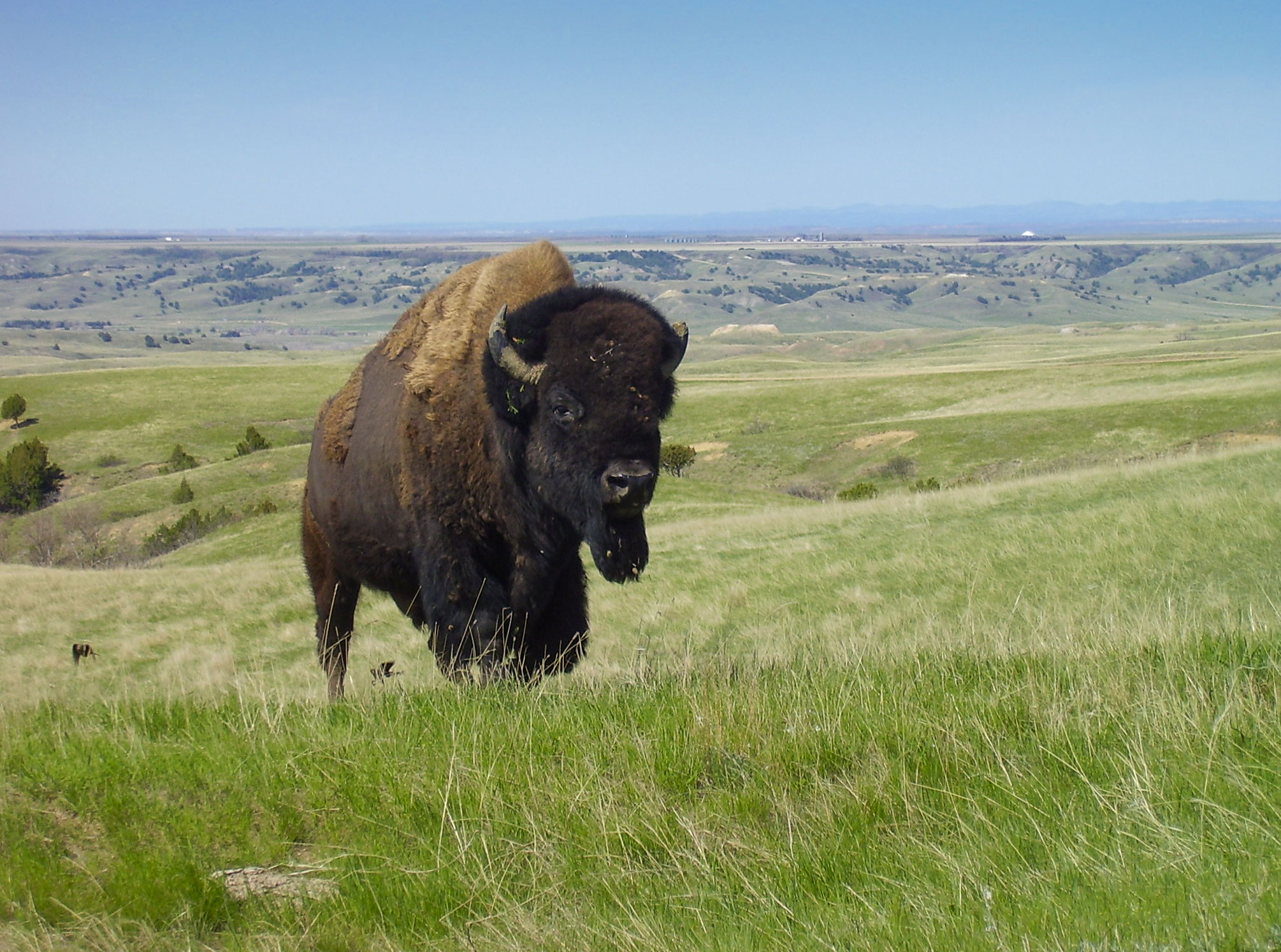
Bison bull

In 1963, 50 bison from Theodore Roosevelt National Park were released. The herd has grown to over 1,200 animals. The bison habitat was expanded in 2019 by 22,000 acres (8,900 ha) to a total of 80,193 acres (32,453 ha) with the construction of 43 miles (69 km) of new fencing. The Bighorn sheep population has increased over the last couple years to a total of 233.

=== Endangered species ===
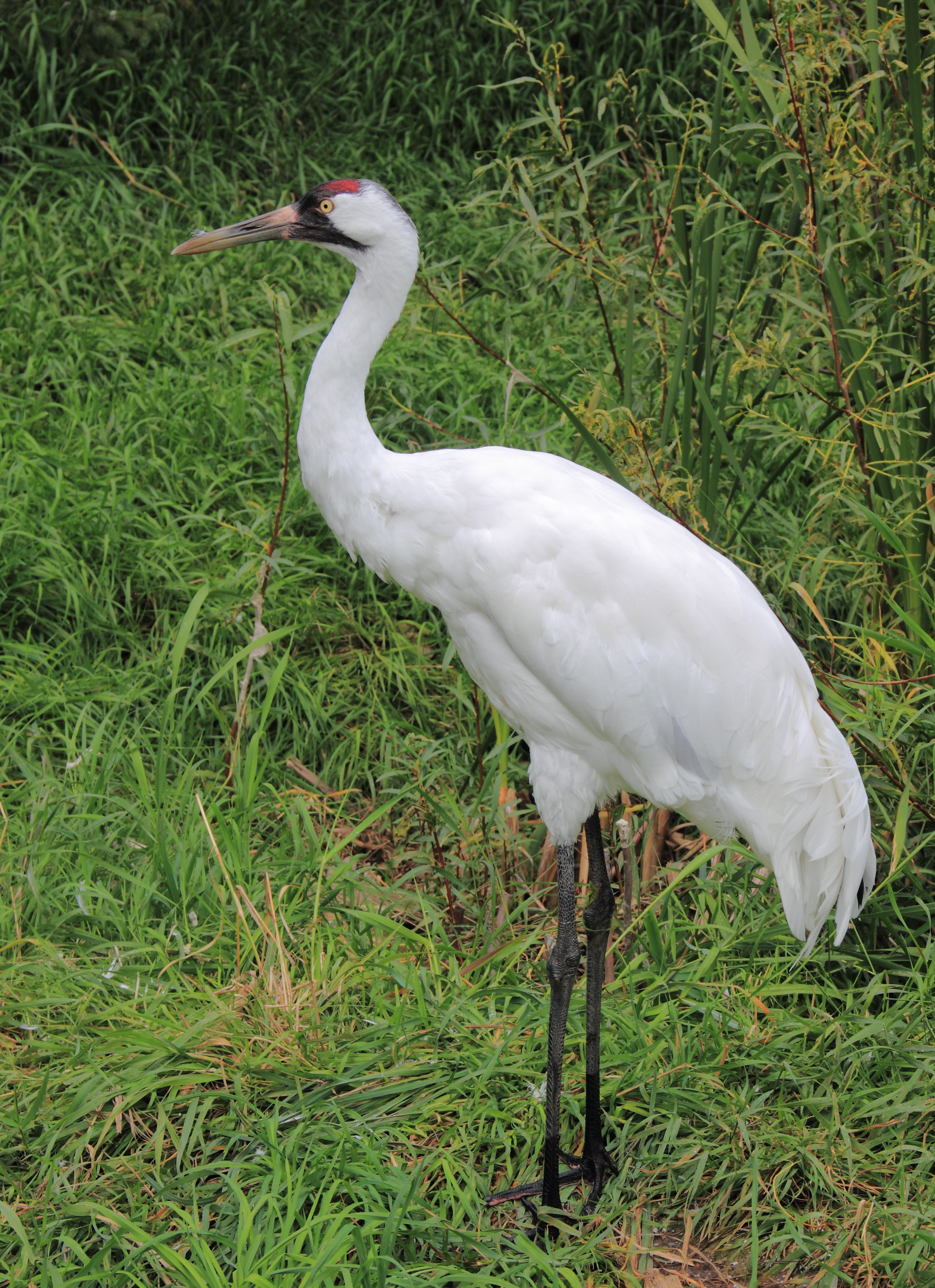
Whooping crane

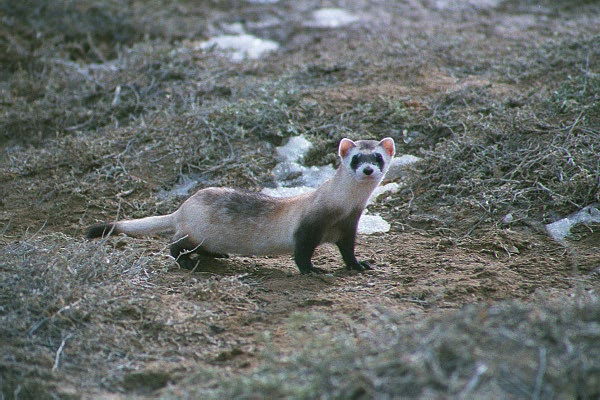
Black-footed ferret

The black-footed ferret and whooping crane are on the endangered species list. The black-footed ferret population inside the Badlands National Park has recovered to a population of approximately 100 individuals. This whooping crane population in the Badlands National Park is considered a non-self-sustaining wild population.

== Vegetation inventory ==
Twenty-three vegetation map classes and ten Anderson Level II land-use classes were used for interpretation of approximately 1.3 million acres encompassing the park (approximately 242,755 acres) and surrounding environs.

A prairie is a large, open expanse of grasslands. A mixed-grass prairie is a grassland where grasses of many different heights grow. Mixed-grass prairies are the transition between eastern tall-grass prairies, where more rainfall means that taller grasses can grow, and western short-grass prairies, where the dry environment favors shorter grasses. In mixed-grass prairies, such as the grasslands surrounding Badlands National Park, grasses can range in height from ankle-high to waist-high. Although trees, shrubs, and forbs grow in the Badlands, grasses dominate the landscape. The most common grass in the park is Western Wheatgrass, which grows one to three feet tall and is the state grass of South Dakota.

== Visitor services ==
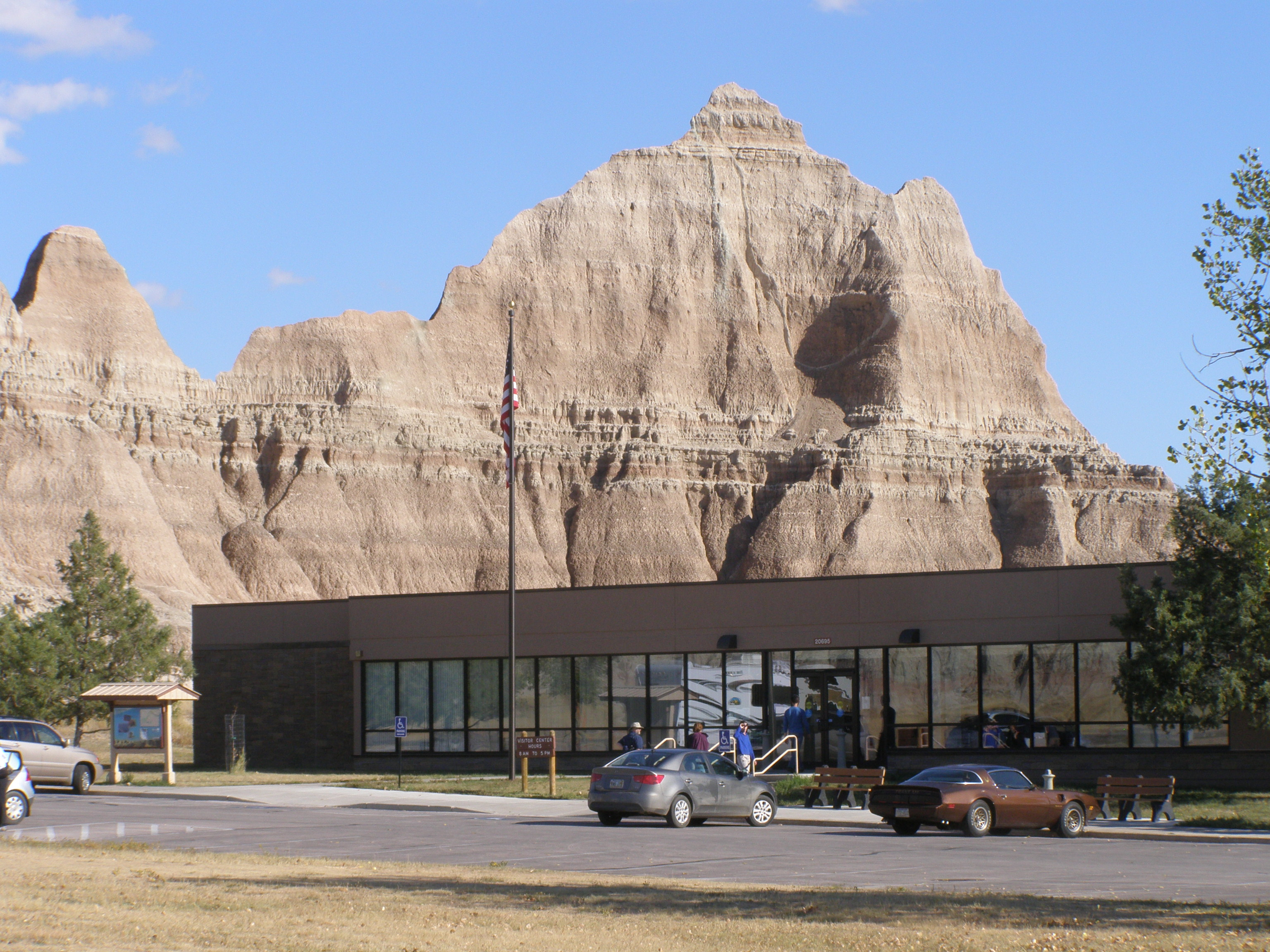
Ben Reifel Visitor Center

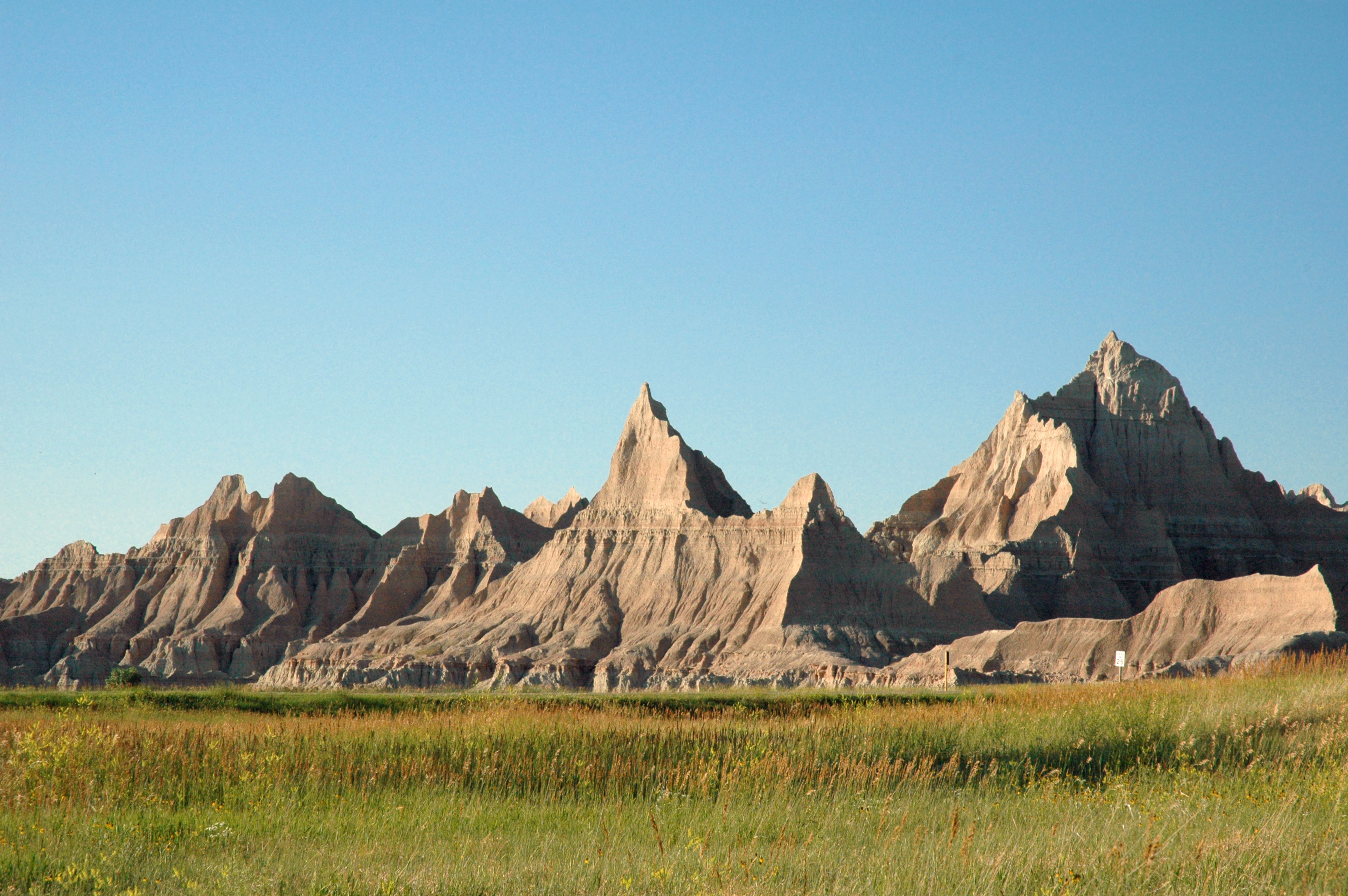
View of the badlands from the Cedar Pass Campground.

Badlands National Park has two campgrounds for overnight visits – Cedar Pass and Sage Creek Campgrounds. Cedar Pass lodge offers accommodations in modern cabins and full-service dining. The Ben Reifel Visitor Center within the park offers a bookstore, special programs, and museum exhibits. The White River Visitors center in the park's South Unit offers information about the region's Lakota heritage. Badlands National Park has established hiking trails, including Cliff Shelf Nature Trail (located near Ben Reifel Visitor Center), Door Trail, Notch Trail, and Window Trail.

The Badlands Wilderness covers about one fourth of the park and was designated in 1976. There are no designated trails and camping is permitted anywhere in what is considered to be the largest undisturbed mixed-prairie rangeland remaining in the U.S. As this wilderness is managed by the National Park Service, hunting is not permitted. U.S. Wilderness Areas do not allow motorized or mechanized vehicles, including bicycles. Although camping and fishing are allowed with proper permit, no roads or buildings are constructed and there is also no logging or mining, in compliance with the 1964 Wilderness Act.

== Climate ==
According to the Köppen climate classification system, Badlands National Park has a hot-summer humid continental climate (Dfa). Summers are hot and dry with occasional thunderstorms, and winters are cold. The wettest month is June, and the driest are December and January. At the park's Interior station, recorded temperatures have ranged from a high of 114 °F (46 °C) to a low of −31 °F (−35 °C), and annual precipitation averages 19.6 inches (500 mm).

Climate data for Interior, South Dakota (1991–2020 normals, extremes 1949–present)
Month	Jan	Feb	Mar	Apr	May	Jun	Jul	Aug	Sep	Oct	Nov	Dec	Year
Record high °F (°C)	71 (22)	75 (24)	85 (29)	94 (34)	102 (39)	109 (43)	114 (46)	110 (43)	106 (41)	97 (36)	84 (29)	72 (22)	114 (46)
Mean maximum °F (°C)	58.2 (14.6)	62.9 (17.2)	75.4 (24.1)	83.5 (28.6)	90.6 (32.6)	97.5 (36.4)	102.6 (39.2)	102.2 (39.0)	99.1 (37.3)	87.4 (30.8)	71.7 (22.1)	60.3 (15.7)	104.4 (40.2)
Mean daily maximum °F (°C)	37.1 (2.8)	40.8 (4.9)	52.5 (11.4)	62.2 (16.8)	72.1 (22.3)	82.7 (28.2)	91.2 (32.9)	90.5 (32.5)	81.8 (27.7)	65.4 (18.6)	50.0 (10.0)	39.0 (3.9)	63.8 (17.7)
Daily mean °F (°C)	25.7 (−3.5)	28.5 (−1.9)	39.1 (3.9)	48.4 (9.1)	58.9 (14.9)	69.2 (20.7)	76.8 (24.9)	75.3 (24.1)	66.2 (19.0)	51.6 (10.9)	37.6 (3.1)	27.8 (−2.3)	50.4 (10.2)
Mean daily minimum °F (°C)	14.2 (−9.9)	16.2 (−8.8)	25.8 (−3.4)	34.7 (1.5)	45.7 (7.6)	55.7 (13.2)	62.3 (16.8)	60.2 (15.7)	50.5 (10.3)	37.8 (3.2)	25.2 (−3.8)	16.6 (−8.6)	37.1 (2.8)
Mean minimum °F (°C)	−10.1 (−23.4)	−6.4 (−21.3)	3.8 (−15.7)	18.8 (−7.3)	31.0 (−0.6)	43.5 (6.4)	52.1 (11.2)	48.1 (8.9)	35.8 (2.1)	19.6 (−6.9)	6.0 (−14.4)	−5.8 (−21.0)	−16.5 (−26.9)
Record low °F (°C)	−28 (−33)	−31 (−35)	−23 (−31)	3 (−16)	20 (−7)	32 (0)	42 (6)	35 (2)	25 (−4)	0 (−18)	−21 (−29)	−31 (−35)	−31 (−35)
Average precipitation inches (mm)	0.46 (12)	0.55 (14)	1.16 (29)	2.26 (57)	3.62 (92)	3.46 (88)	2.23 (57)	1.81 (46)	1.39 (35)	1.59 (40)	0.53 (13)	0.54 (14)	19.60 (498)
Average snowfall inches (cm)	5.5 (14)	6.4 (16)	5.9 (15)	6.4 (16)	0.5 (1.3)	0.0 (0.0)	0.0 (0.0)	0.0 (0.0)	0.0 (0.0)	1.9 (4.8)	3.7 (9.4)	7.7 (20)	38.0 (97)
Average precipitation days (≥ 0.01 in)	4.4	4.8	5.6	8.7	9.8	10.4	8.1	6.5	5.8	6.5	4.4	4.8	79.8
Average snowy days (≥ 0.1 in)	3.2	3.3	2.6	1.6	0.1	0.0	0.0	0.0	0.0	0.8	1.8	3.9	17.3
Source: NOAA

== Gallery ==
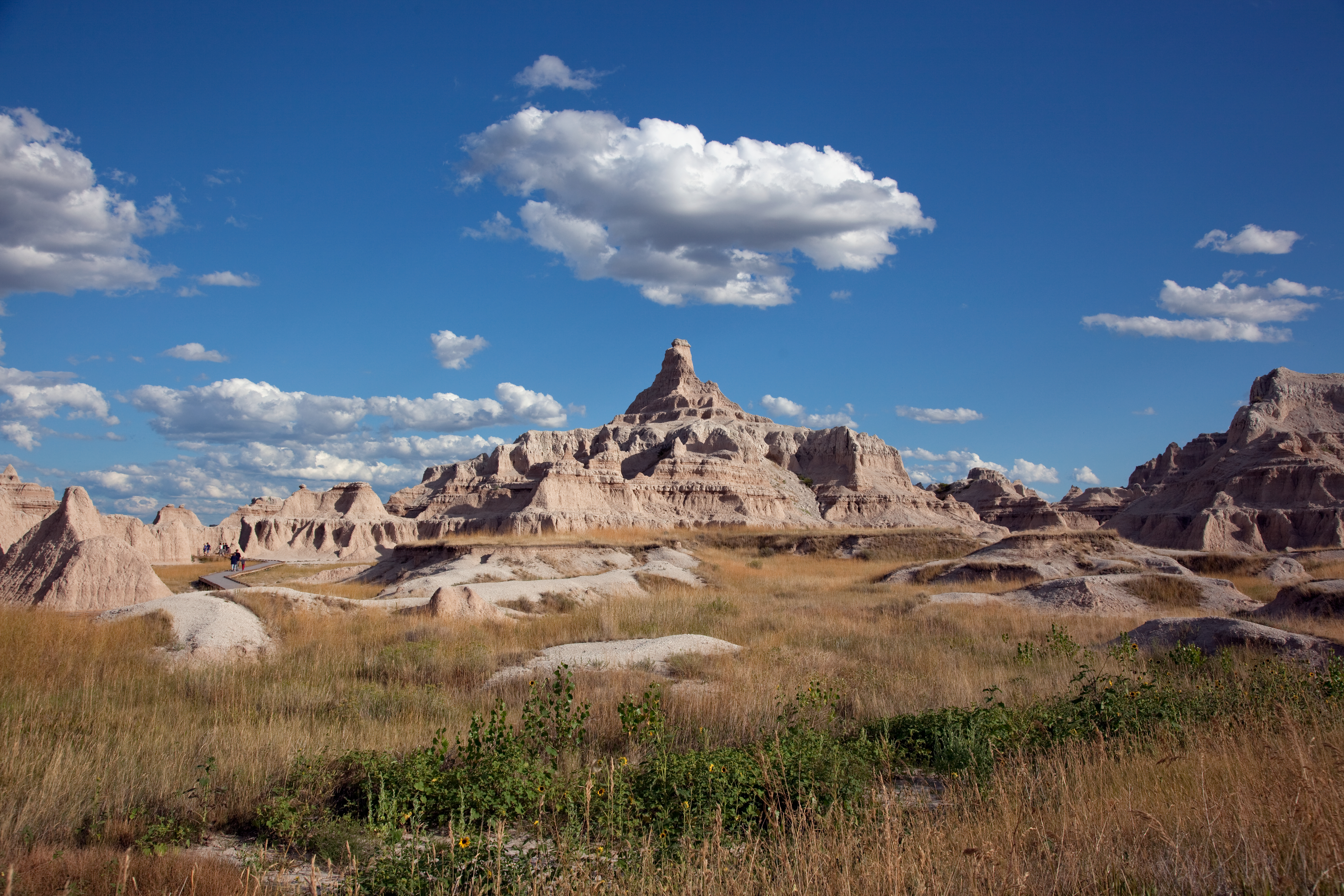
Buttes and pinnacles

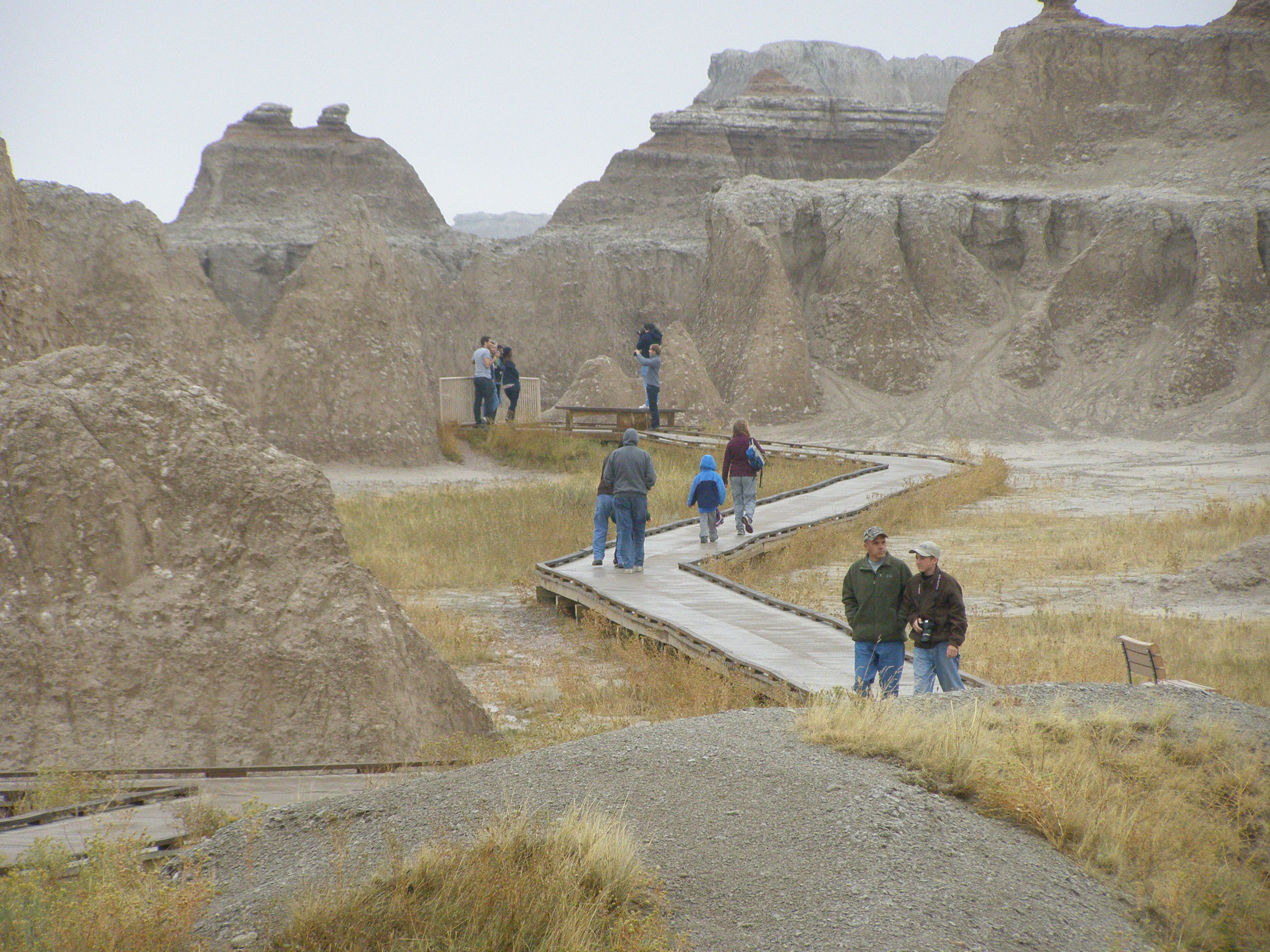
Boardwalk to the Windows

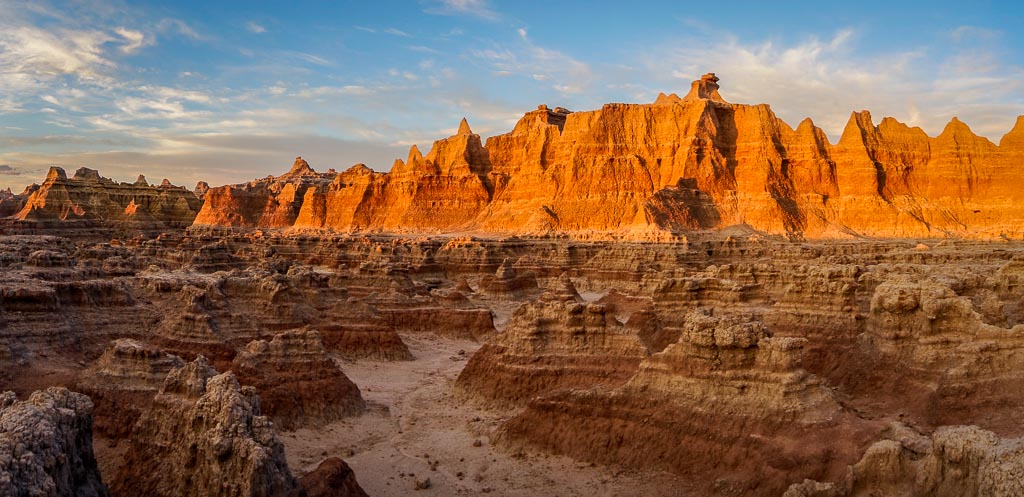
Door Trail

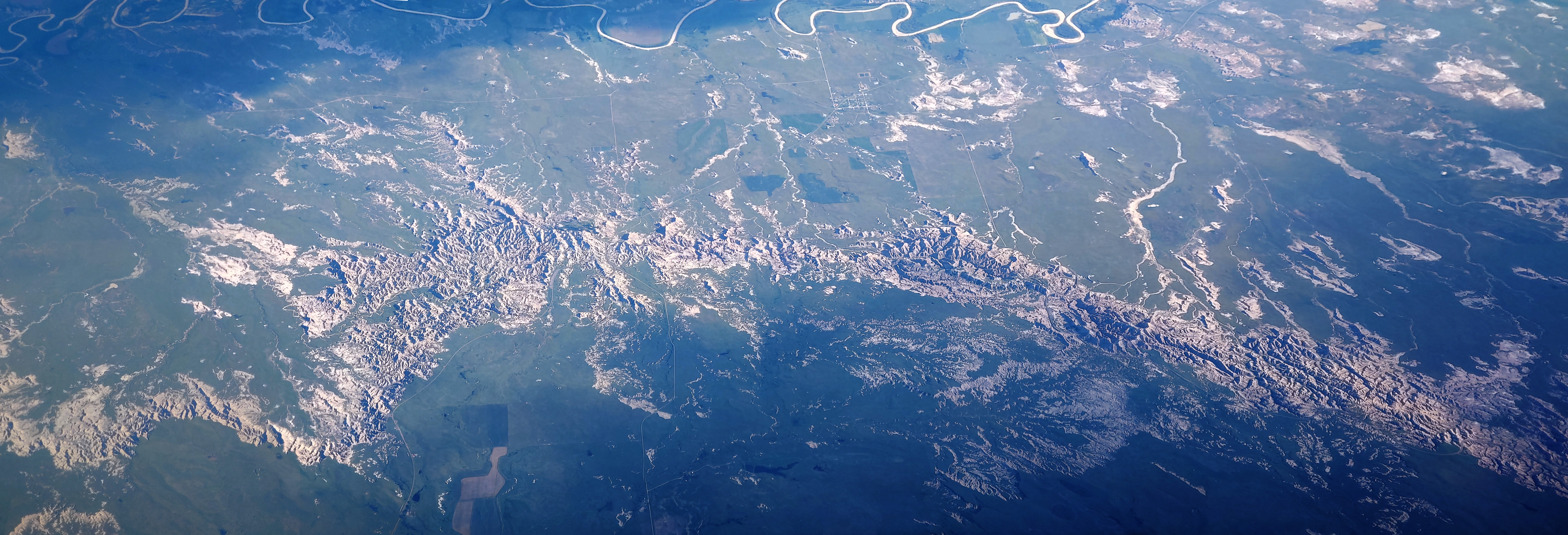
A southward aerial view of the park, with White River at the top (south) and the small town of Interior upper right center.

== Current issues and challenges ==
Badlands National Park has been impacted by the rise of oil and gas pipelines and drilling, the debate over Native American land rights, fossil loss due to criminal activity, and climate change.

=== Oil pipelines/drilling ===
Badlands National Park faces growing encroachment from oil and gas companies hoping to transport fossil fuels throughout regions of South Dakota. Pipelines are associated with environmental risks; breaches and or breaks in the system have the potential to negatively impact the quality of life for surrounding ecosystems and wildlife.

=== Land rights claims ===
The Badlands National Park also faces debate over the federal claims to the land once inhabited by the Oglala Lakota Sioux tribe. Supporters of Oglala Sioux reparations argue against the U.S. government's seizure and management over sacred Native American land. The Badlands National Park began taking steps to reserve part of the park's southern unit for management by the tribe's members, creating jobs and returning ownership to those re-located out during America's Manifest Destiny, however this creation of the "Tribal National Park" has yet to come to pass.

=== Fossil depletion ===
The Badlands National Park was first established as a national monument in order to protect the abundance of fossils within the land's natural stone structures. Since the park's founding, visitors and fossil poachers have been looting the park's fossils to keep for sentimental and scientific value or to sell for profit.

=== Climate change ===
By 2050, the NPS predicts that Badlands National Park will have different conditions from those currently felt in the park—including increasing or decreasing temperatures, changes in quantity of total spring precipitation, potential delays in the start of spring within the park, and various increasing frequencies of heavy precipitation events. Widespread summer drought is projected to be more likely in South Dakota within the same time frame (2050). On average, the counties of Oglala Lakota, Pennington, and Jackson (the three main counties that the park occupies) have seen a gradual shift of monthly and annual temperatures between 1901 and 2021, leading to a warmer, drier environment.

Current climate predictions developed by the NPS have allowed Badlands National Park to develop several management techniques preparing for different climate scenarios, categorized as "no-gainer", "no-regrets", or "no-brainer" management styles. According to the NPS Climate Scenarios brief for the park, a "no-gainer" is a current action that is not likely to achieve desired outcomes in any given future scenario. A "no-regrets" management style implements new actions that are likely to be successful in management of all potential future scenarios. "No-brainer" management involves maintaining current management practices that are likely to be beneficial, but aren't necessarily ideal. Climate Change management within the park primarily focuses on native vegetation, bison populations, species rehabilitation, archeological and paleontological preservation, and infrastructure and geohazards. Management plans for these values are primarily under the categories "no-regrets" and "no-brainer".

== See also ==
- List of national parks of the United States
- Badlands
