= U.S. Route 385 =

Highway in the United States

U.S. Route 385
- US 385 highlighted in red

Route information
- Auxiliary route of US 85
- Length: 1,206 mi (1,941 km)
- Existed: 1958–present

Major junctions
- South end: Big Bend National Park, TX
- I-10 at Fort Stockton, TX; I-20 at Odessa, TX; I-40 at Vega, TX; I-70 at Burlington, CO; I-76 at Julesburg, CO; I-80 near Chappell, NE
- North end: US 85 at Deadwood, SD

Location
- Country: United States
- States: Texas, Oklahoma, Colorado, Nebraska, South Dakota

Highway system
- United States Numbered Highway System; List; Special; Divided

U.S. Route 385 (US 385) is a spur of U.S. Route 85 that runs for 1,206 miles (1,941 km) from Deadwood, South Dakota to Big Bend National Park in Texas.

== Route description ==
Lengths
	mi	km
TX	545	877
OK	36	58
CO	317	510
NE	181	290
SD	122	196
Total	1206	1941

=== Texas ===
US 385 is designated as a part of the La Entrada al Pacifico trade corridor from Interstate 10 in Fort Stockton to Interstate 20 in Odessa. The section from Fort Stockton to McCamey runs concurrently with US 67. From McCamey, the route proceeds to Crane in Crane County.

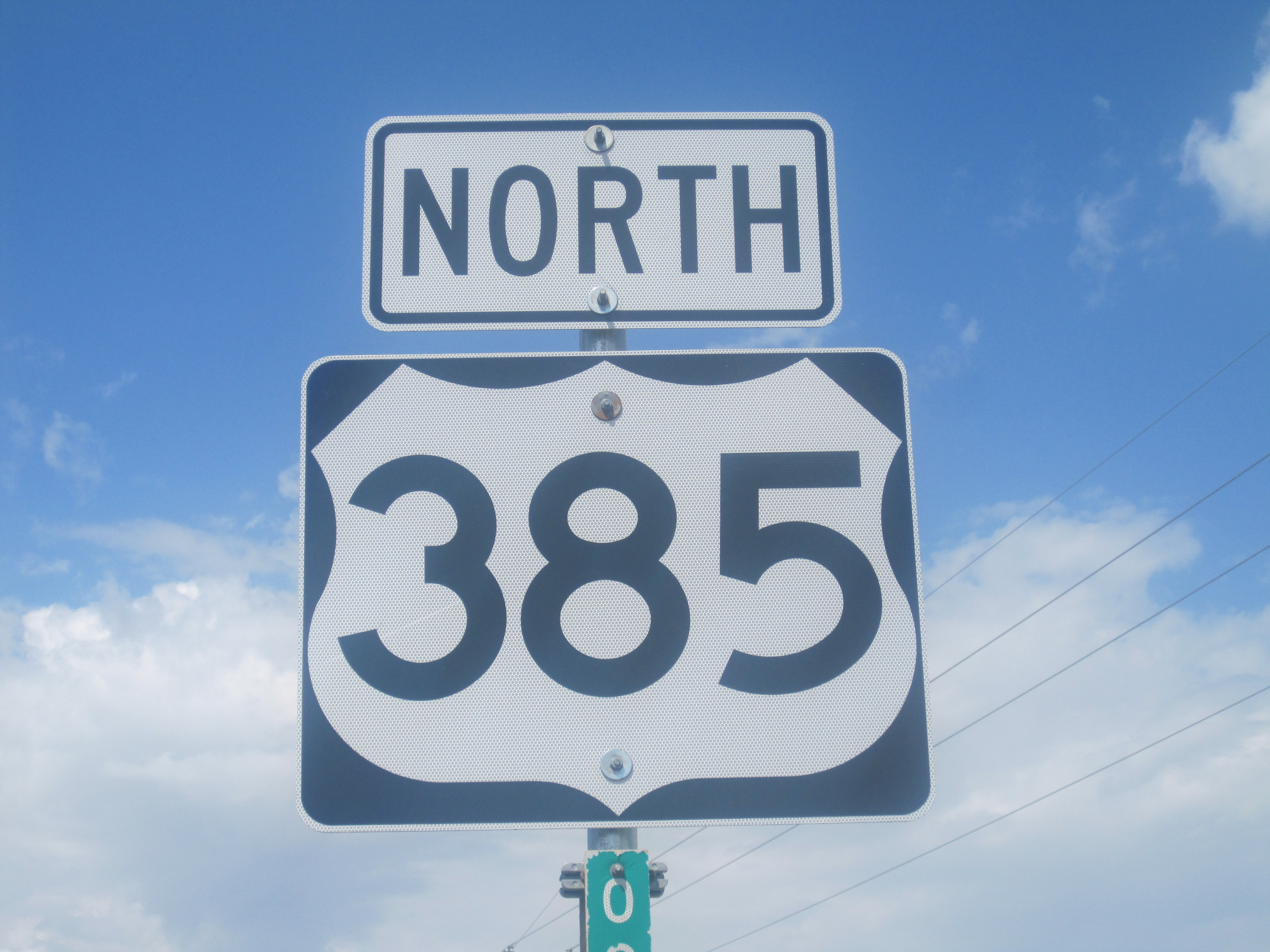
US 385 in Texas Panhandle north of Vega, Texas

From Crane to Odessa, US 385 intersects with U.S. Highway 62 in Seminole and continues northward to Brownfield, where US 385 continues northward towards Levelland and crosses by Texas State Highway 86 in Dimmitt, as well as U.S. Highway 84 in Littlefield. From Littlefield, US 385 continues northward until it crosses Interstate 40 and then goes in a half circle to Hartley, where US 385 joins U.S. Highway 87. US 385 and US 87 follow a northwest track until the two meet U.S. Highway 54 then split, with US 385 continuing northward until it exits Texas at the Oklahoma border.

On rural US 385, the speed limit is 75 mph in all counties going south of Gaines County starting between Seminole and Andrews down to US 90 in Marathon.

=== Oklahoma ===
In Oklahoma, US-385 runs through Cimarron County at the end of the Oklahoma panhandle. Fourteen miles north of the border, it joins with US-56, US-64, and US-412. The three highways run northeast into the county seat, Boise City. In the middle of town, the highways come to a traffic circle surrounding the Cimarron County Courthouse. The traffic circle serves six highways (with most passing through): U.S. Routes 56, 64, 385 and 412, and State Highways 3 and 325.

After leaving the circle, US-385 heads northward, overlapping US-287 and SH-3, the state's longest state highway. SH-3 ends at the state line while US-287/385 continue north into Colorado.

The section of US-385 that overlaps SH-3 is also signed as Governor George Nigh's Northwest Passage, after the governor of Oklahoma responsible for improvements to the corridor.

=== Colorado ===
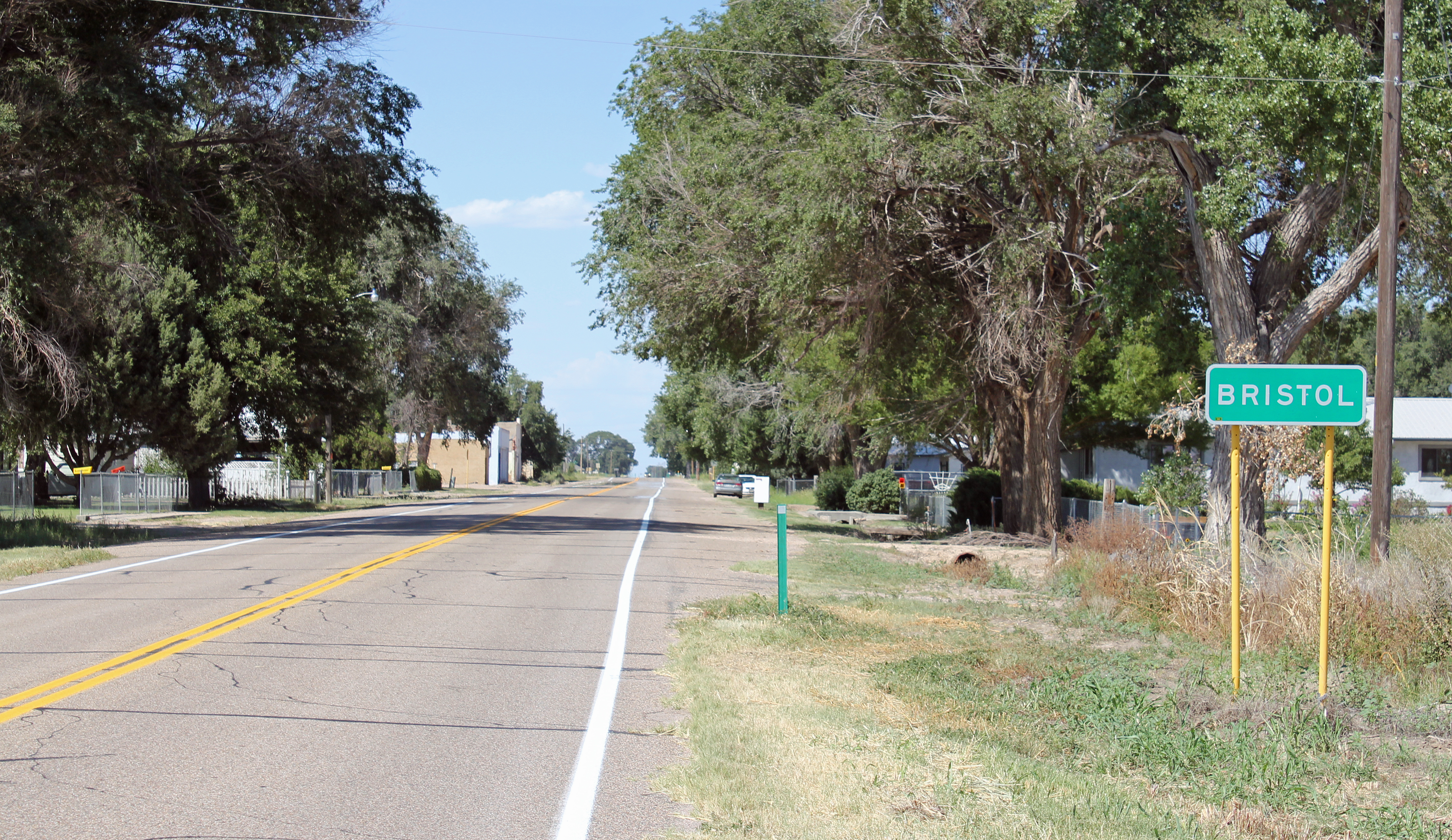
View of US 385 entering Bristol, Colorado

U.S. 385 passes north–south through the easternmost counties of Colorado. It enters the state south of Campo on an overlap with U.S. Route 287. The overlap continues north until Lamar. At Lamar, the route turns east on an overlap with U.S. Route 50 and this overlap ends in Granada. The highway turns north at Granada and meets Interstate 70 at Burlington and Interstate 76 at Julesburg. The highway leaves Colorado northwest of Julesburg.

=== Nebraska ===
U.S. 385 passes north–south through the Nebraska Panhandle. It enters Nebraska south of Chappell and overlaps U.S. Route 30 between Chappell and Sidney. At Sidney, it turns north, meeting U.S. Route 26 at Bridgeport. It passes through Alliance before intersecting U.S. Route 20 at Chadron. It exits the state northwest of Chadron. Throughout its entire length in Nebraska, US 385 is known as the Gold Rush Byway, one of nine scenic byways in the state.

=== South Dakota ===
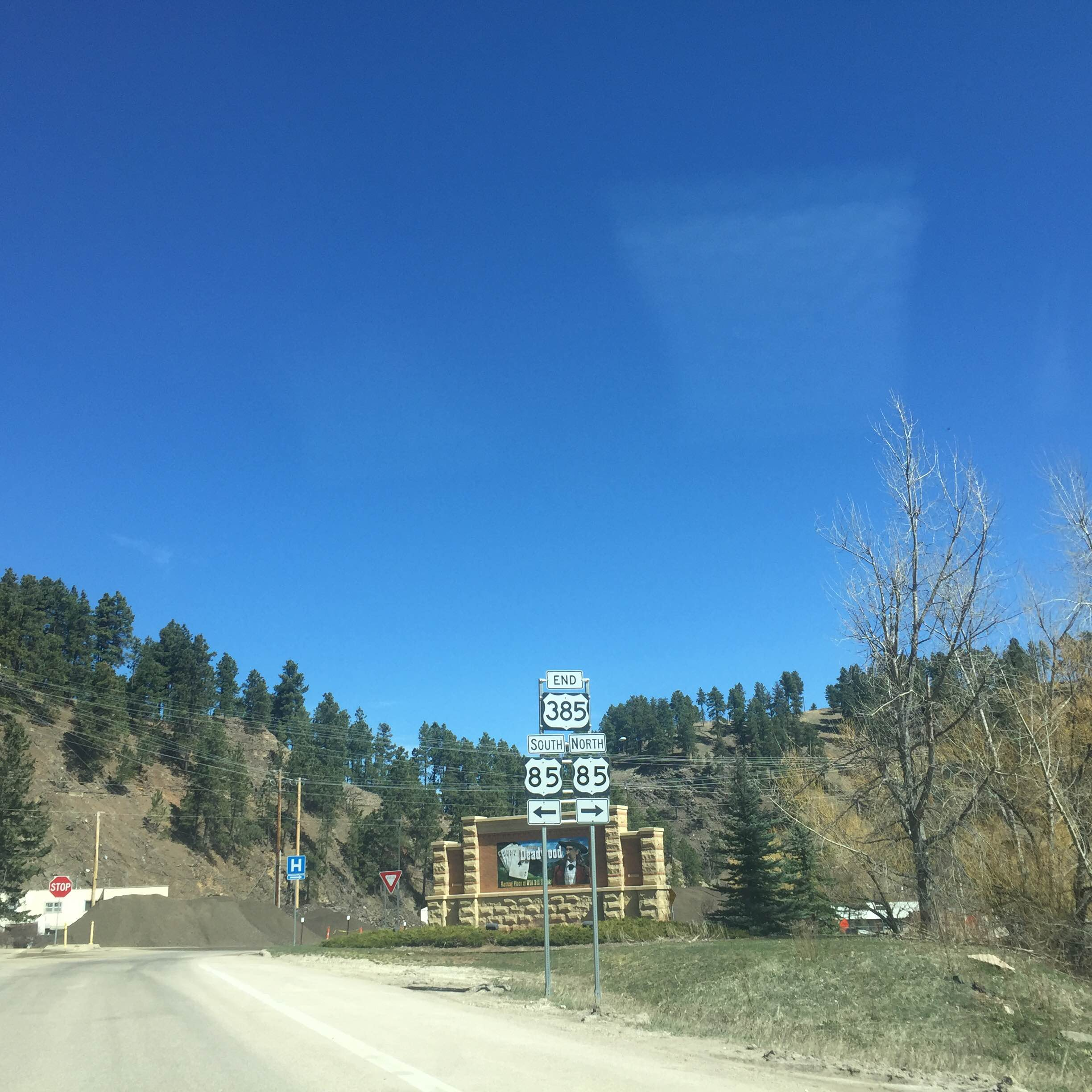
Northern terminus of US 385 in Deadwood

U.S. 385 enters South Dakota south of Oelrichs. It is overlapped with U.S. Route 18 between Oelrichs and Hot Springs. U.S. 385 turns north and enters Wind Cave National Park before turning west to go through Pringle. At Custer, it begins an overlap with U.S. Route 16, which ends near Hill City. U.S. 385 gradually turns in a northwesterly direction and ends at an intersection with U.S. Route 85 at Deadwood.

Legally, the South Dakota section of U.S. 385, with the exception of concurrencies with U.S. 16 and U.S. 18 and a gap at Wind Cave National Park, is defined at South Dakota Codified Laws § 31-4-235.

== History ==
Today's US 385 is the second route to bear the number. The original route eventually became part of US 87. This US 385 designation was decommissioned around 1935.

The current US 385 first appeared in 1959. Originally, the route continued along US 287 north of Lamar, Colorado, splitting in Kit Carson to follow US 40 east to meet up with the present-day alignment in Cheyenne Wells.

In South Dakota, in 2009, the South Dakota Department of Transportation designated US 16/US 385 between Custer and Hill City, which passes by the Crazy Horse Memorial, now being carved in the Black Hills. This segment of US 385 is also a part of the George Hearst Memorial Highway.

== Major intersections ==
Texas
The north entrance to Big Bend National Park south-southeast of Marathon
US 90 in Marathon. The highways travel concurrently to east of Marathon.
US 285 in Fort Stockton. The highways travel concurrently through Fort Stockton.
I-10 / US 67 in Fort Stockton. I-10/US 385 travels concurrently to east-southeast of Fort Stockton. US 67/US 385 travels concurrently to McCamey.
I-20 in Odessa
US 62 / US 180 in Seminole. US 62/US 385 travels concurrently to Brownfield.
US 82 / US 380 in Brownfield. The highways travel concurrently through Brownfield.
US 84 in Littlefield
US 70 in Springlake
US 60 in Hereford
I-40 in Vega
US 87 in Hartley. The highways travel concurrently to Dalhart.
US 54 in Dalhart
Oklahoma
US 56 / US 64 / US 412 southwest of Boise City. The highways travel concurrently to Boise City.
US 287 north of Boise City. The highways travel concurrently to Lamar, Colorado.
Colorado
US 160 south of Springfield
US 50 / US 287 in Lamar. US 50/US 385 travels concurrently to Granada.
US 50 / US 400 in Granada
US 40 in Cheyenne Wells. The highways travel concurrently to east of Cheyenne Wells.
I-70 in Burlington
US 24 in Burlington. The highways travel concurrently through Burlington.
US 36 east of Idalia. The highways travel concurrently to northeast of Idalia.
US 34 in Wray
US 6 in Holyoke
I-76 in Julesburg
US 138 in Julesburg. The highways travel concurrently to west-southwest of Julesburg.
Nebraska
US 30 in Chappell. The highways travel concurrently to Sidney.
US 26 in Bridgeport. The highways travel concurrently to Northport.
US 20 in Chadron. The highways travel concurrently to west of Chadron.
South Dakota
US 18 in Oelrichs. The highways travel concurrently to Hot Springs.
US 16 in Custer. The highways travel concurrently to east-northeast of Hill City.
US 85 in Deadwood

== See also ==
Browse numbered routes
← US 380	TX	→ I-410
← US 377	OK	→ US 412
← N-370	NE	→ I-480
← SD 377	SD	→ SD 391
