= Interior, South Dakota =

Interior, South Dakota Makȟóšiča Otȟúŋwahe
- Town
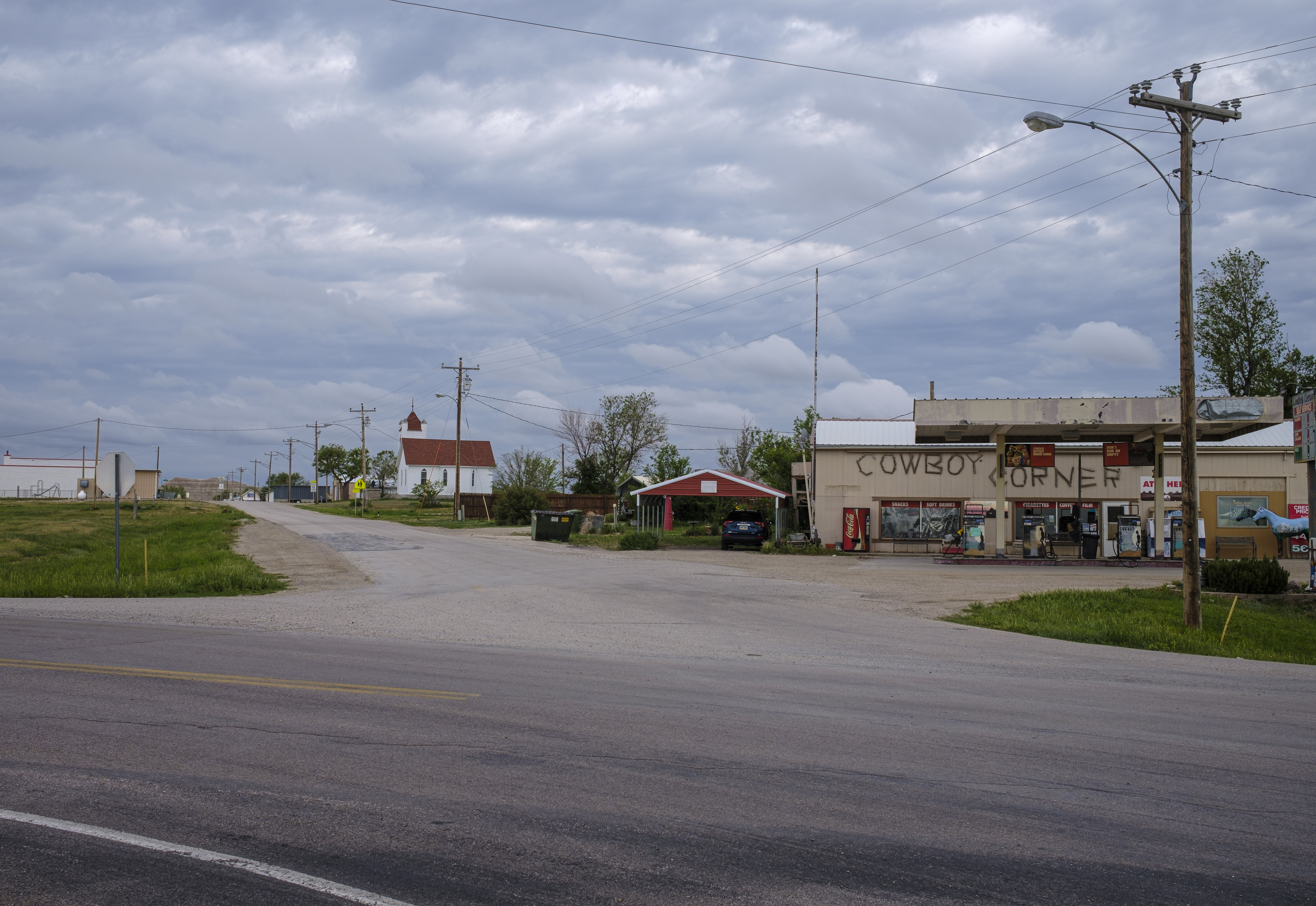

- Location in Jackson County and the state of South Dakota
- Coordinates: 43°43′36″N 101°59′01″W
- Country: United States
- State: South Dakota
- County: Jackson
- Incorporated: 1907

Area
  - Total: 1.34 sq mi (3.48 km^{2})
  - Land: 1.34 sq mi (3.47 km^{2})
  - Water: 0.0039 sq mi (0.01 km^{2})
- Elevation: 2,382 ft (726 m)

Population (2020)
  - Total: 65
  - Density: 48.6/sq mi (18.75/km^{2})
- Time zone: UTC-7 (Mountain (MST))
  - Summer (DST): UTC-6 (MDT)
- ZIP code: 57750
- Area code: 605
- FIPS code: 46-31620
- GNIS feature ID: 1267435

Interior (Lakota: Makȟóšiča Otȟúŋwahe; "Badlands village") is a town in Jackson County, South Dakota, United States. The population was 65 at the 2020 census.

Interior got its start in 1907 when the Milwaukee Railroad was extended to that point.

== History ==
Norwegian immigrants George and Louis Johnson moved from Chamberlain, South Dakota to the banks of the White River just north of the Pine Ridge Reservation in 1883 to establish a way-station for freighting between Chamberlain and the Black Hills. In 1886, the area was connected by rail to Gordon, Nebraska. In 1891, the former way-station was called Black, with Mary Johnson as its first postmaster. In 1893, the town was renamed "Interior" by George Johnson because he did not think the name "Black" fit the description of the White River that surrounded the town. In 1907 and 1908, the town was moved two miles and half northwest along the White River to meet the Milwaukee Railroad. The former location of the town became known as "old Interior".

The town went through major developments in the 1910s: in 1910, an efficient water system transporting water directly from the White River to Interior was installed and an electric grid was installed in 1912. Now with unlimited freshwater combined with being situated along the Milwaukee Railroad and near the Badlands, local committees seized the opportunity to use the town's advantage. In 1919, 21 and 22, the town hosted roundups that tourists traveled by train as far from Minneapolis to see. The events hosted cowboys from across the country and Native Americans in traditional clothing also participating.

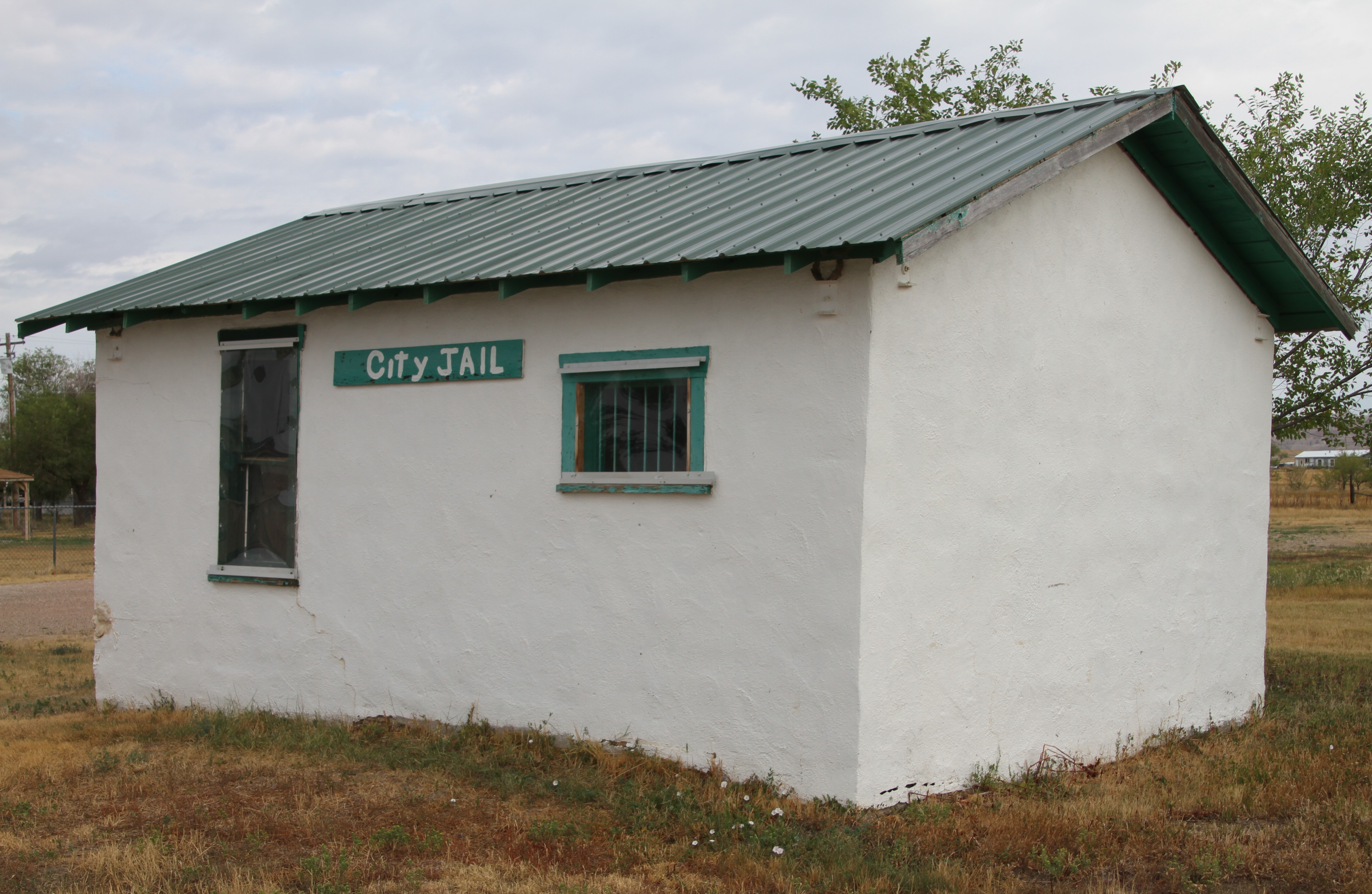
Interior city jail

== Geography ==
Interior is located along the White River approximately one mile from Badlands National Park.

According to the United States Census Bureau, the town has a total area of 1.35 square miles (3.50 km^{2}), of which 1.34 square miles (3.47 km^{2}) is land and 0.01 square miles (0.03 km^{2}) is water.

=== Climate ===
Climate data for Interior, South Dakota (1991–2020 normals, extremes 1949–present)
Month	Jan	Feb	Mar	Apr	May	Jun	Jul	Aug	Sep	Oct	Nov	Dec	Year
Record high °F (°C)	71 (22)	75 (24)	85 (29)	94 (34)	102 (39)	109 (43)	114 (46)	110 (43)	106 (41)	97 (36)	84 (29)	72 (22)	114 (46)
Mean maximum °F (°C)	58.2 (14.6)	62.9 (17.2)	75.4 (24.1)	83.5 (28.6)	90.6 (32.6)	97.5 (36.4)	102.6 (39.2)	102.2 (39.0)	99.1 (37.3)	87.4 (30.8)	71.7 (22.1)	60.3 (15.7)	104.4 (40.2)
Mean daily maximum °F (°C)	37.1 (2.8)	40.8 (4.9)	52.5 (11.4)	62.2 (16.8)	72.1 (22.3)	82.7 (28.2)	91.2 (32.9)	90.5 (32.5)	81.8 (27.7)	65.4 (18.6)	50.0 (10.0)	39.0 (3.9)	63.8 (17.7)
Daily mean °F (°C)	25.7 (−3.5)	28.5 (−1.9)	39.1 (3.9)	48.4 (9.1)	58.9 (14.9)	69.2 (20.7)	76.8 (24.9)	75.3 (24.1)	66.2 (19.0)	51.6 (10.9)	37.6 (3.1)	27.8 (−2.3)	50.4 (10.2)
Mean daily minimum °F (°C)	14.2 (−9.9)	16.2 (−8.8)	25.8 (−3.4)	34.7 (1.5)	45.7 (7.6)	55.7 (13.2)	62.3 (16.8)	60.2 (15.7)	50.5 (10.3)	37.8 (3.2)	25.2 (−3.8)	16.6 (−8.6)	37.1 (2.8)
Mean minimum °F (°C)	−10.1 (−23.4)	−6.4 (−21.3)	3.8 (−15.7)	18.8 (−7.3)	31.0 (−0.6)	43.5 (6.4)	52.1 (11.2)	48.1 (8.9)	35.8 (2.1)	19.6 (−6.9)	6.0 (−14.4)	−5.8 (−21.0)	−16.5 (−26.9)
Record low °F (°C)	−28 (−33)	−31 (−35)	−23 (−31)	3 (−16)	20 (−7)	32 (0)	42 (6)	35 (2)	25 (−4)	0 (−18)	−21 (−29)	−31 (−35)	−31 (−35)
Average precipitation inches (mm)	0.46 (12)	0.55 (14)	1.16 (29)	2.26 (57)	3.62 (92)	3.46 (88)	2.23 (57)	1.81 (46)	1.39 (35)	1.59 (40)	0.53 (13)	0.54 (14)	19.60 (498)
Average snowfall inches (cm)	5.5 (14)	6.4 (16)	5.9 (15)	6.4 (16)	0.5 (1.3)	0.0 (0.0)	0.0 (0.0)	0.0 (0.0)	0.0 (0.0)	1.9 (4.8)	3.7 (9.4)	7.7 (20)	38.0 (97)
Average precipitation days (≥ 0.01 in)	4.4	4.8	5.6	8.7	9.8	10.4	8.1	6.5	5.8	6.5	4.4	4.8	79.8
Average snowy days (≥ 0.1 in)	3.2	3.3	2.6	1.6	0.1	0.0	0.0	0.0	0.0	0.8	1.8	3.9	17.3
Source: NOAA

== Demographics ==
Historical population
Census	Pop.	Note	%±
1930	144		—
1940	182		26.4%
1950	126		−30.8%
1960	179		42.1%
1970	81		−54.7%
1980	62		−23.5%
1990	67		8.1%
2000	77		14.9%
2010	94		22.1%
2020	65		−30.9%
U.S. Decennial Census

=== 2010 census ===
As of the census of 2010, there were 94 people, 40 households, and 24 families residing in the town. The population density was 70.1 inhabitants per square mile (27.1/km^{2}). There were 55 housing units at an average density of 41.0 per square mile (15.8/km^{2}). The racial makeup of the town was 70.2% White, 19.1% Native American, and 10.6% from two or more races.

There were 40 households, of which 27.5% had children under the age of 18 living with them, 45.0% were married couples living together, 12.5% had a female householder with no husband present, 2.5% had a male householder with no wife present, and 40.0% were non-families. 27.5% of all households were made up of individuals, and 10% had someone living alone who was 65 years of age or older. The average household size was 2.35 and the average family size was 3.00.

The median age in the town was 41.5 years. 24.5% of residents were under the age of 18; 3.1% were between the ages of 18 and 24; 26.6% were from 25 to 44; 32.9% were from 45 to 64; and 12.8% were 65 years of age or older. The gender makeup of the town was 46.8% male and 53.2% female.

=== 2000 census ===
As of the census of 2000, there were 77 people, 35 households, and 22 families residing in the town. The population density was 57.3 inhabitants per square mile (22.1/km^{2}). There were 53 housing units at an average density of 39.4 per square mile (15.2/km^{2}). The racial makeup of the town was 61.04% White, 35.06% Native American, and 3.90% from two or more races. Hispanic or Latino of any race were 1.30% of the population.

There were 35 households, out of which 20.0% had children under the age of 18 living with them, 54.3% were married couples living together, 5.7% had a female householder with no husband present, and 37.1% were non-families. 31.4% of all households were made up of individuals, and 14.3% had someone living alone who was 65 years of age or older. The average household size was 2.20 and the average family size was 2.77.

In the town, the population was spread out, with 22.1% under the age of 18, 6.5% from 18 to 24, 27.3% from 25 to 44, 32.5% from 45 to 64, and 11.7% who were 65 years of age or older. The median age was 40 years. For every 100 females, there were 108.1 males. For every 100 females age 18 and over, there were 93.5 males.

The median income for a household in the town was $31,719, and the median income for a family was $32,500. Males had a median income of $11,250 versus $21,750 for females. The per capita income for the town was $27,247. There were no families and 8.8% of the population living below the poverty line, including no residents younger than eighteen and none over 64.
