= National Register of Historic Places listings in Gregory County, South Dakota =

Location of Gregory County in South Dakota

This is a list of the National Register of Historic Places listings in Gregory County, South Dakota.

This was intended to be a complete list of the properties and districts on the National Register of Historic Places in Gregory County, South Dakota, United States. The locations of National Register properties and districts for which the latitude and longitude coordinates are included below, may be seen in a map.

There are 12 properties and districts listed on the National Register in the county. Another 2 properties were once listed but have been removed.

This National Park Service list is complete through NPS recent listings posted November 13, 2026.

== Current listings ==
| | Name on the Register | Image | Date listed | Location | City or town | Description |
|---|---|---|---|---|---|---|
| 1 | Dallas Carnegie Library | Dallas Carnegie Library | May 28, 1976 (#76001734) | 405 Main St. 43°14′10″N 99°31′01″W | Dallas | |
| 2 | Fort Randall | Fort Randall | April 22, 1976 (#76001735) | 3 miles southwest of Pickstown; 43°02′51″N 98°33′32″W | Pickstown | |
| 3 | Gregory Buttes Stone Steps | Gregory Buttes Stone Steps | July 28, 2004 (#04000763) | 200 and 300 blocks of 11th-14th Sts. 43°14′23″N 99°26′04″W | Gregory | |
| 4 | Gregory County Courthouse | Gregory County Courthouse | February 4, 2021 (#100006095) | 221 East 8th St. 43°10′56″N 99°17′24″W | Burke | |
| 5 | Gregory County State Bank | Gregory County State Bank | November 19, 1998 (#98001399) | Main St. at its junction with Randall St. 43°01′39″N 98°53′19″W | Fairfax | |
| 6 | Gregory National Bank | Gregory National Bank | July 30, 2013 (#13000573) | 524 Main St; 43°13′56″N 99°25′52″W | Gregory | |
| 7 | Herrick Elevator | Herrick Elevator | May 30, 2003 (#03000498) | U.S. Route 18; 43°07′26″N 99°10′58″W | Herrick | |
| 8 | Herrick Public School | Herrick Public School | August 16, 2000 (#00001000) | 450 8th St. 43°07′08″N 99°11′21″W | Herrick | |
| 9 | Pocahontas Schoolhouse | Pocahontas Schoolhouse | April 26, 1973 (#73001743) | Near 5th and Main; 43°13′53″N 99°25′48″W | Gregory | Not extant in 2024 per Google Street View. Only concrete pad is visible. |
| 10 | St. Augustine Church | St. Augustine Church | November 20, 2009 (#09000944) | Southeastern corner of the junction of 6th and Main Sts. 43°14′02″N 99°31′02″W | Dallas | |
| 11 | St. John's Catholic Church | St. John's Catholic Church | November 20, 2009 (#09000945) | Section 31 R96W 73N of Dickens Township, near Dallas; 43°04′57″N 99°32′00″W | Paxton | |
| 12 | Tackett Underwood Building | Tackett Underwood Building | June 3, 1999 (#99000678) | 518 and 520 Main; 43°13′55″N 99°25′52″W | Gregory | |

== Former listings ==
| | Name on the Register | Image | Date listed | Date removed | Location | City or town | Description |
|---|---|---|---|---|---|---|---|
| 1 | South Dakota Department of Transportation Bridge No. 27-000-201 | | December 9, 1993 (#93001289) | March 26, 2008 | Local road over unnamed creek | Dallas vicinity | |
| 2 | South Dakota Department of Transportation Bridge No. 27-060-298 | | December 9, 1993 (#93001290) | December 15, 1999 | | Gregory vicinity | |

== See also ==
- List of National Historic Landmarks in South Dakota
- National Register of Historic Places listings in South Dakota
