= Ponca Creek =

Coordinates: 42°48′41″N 98°08′04″W

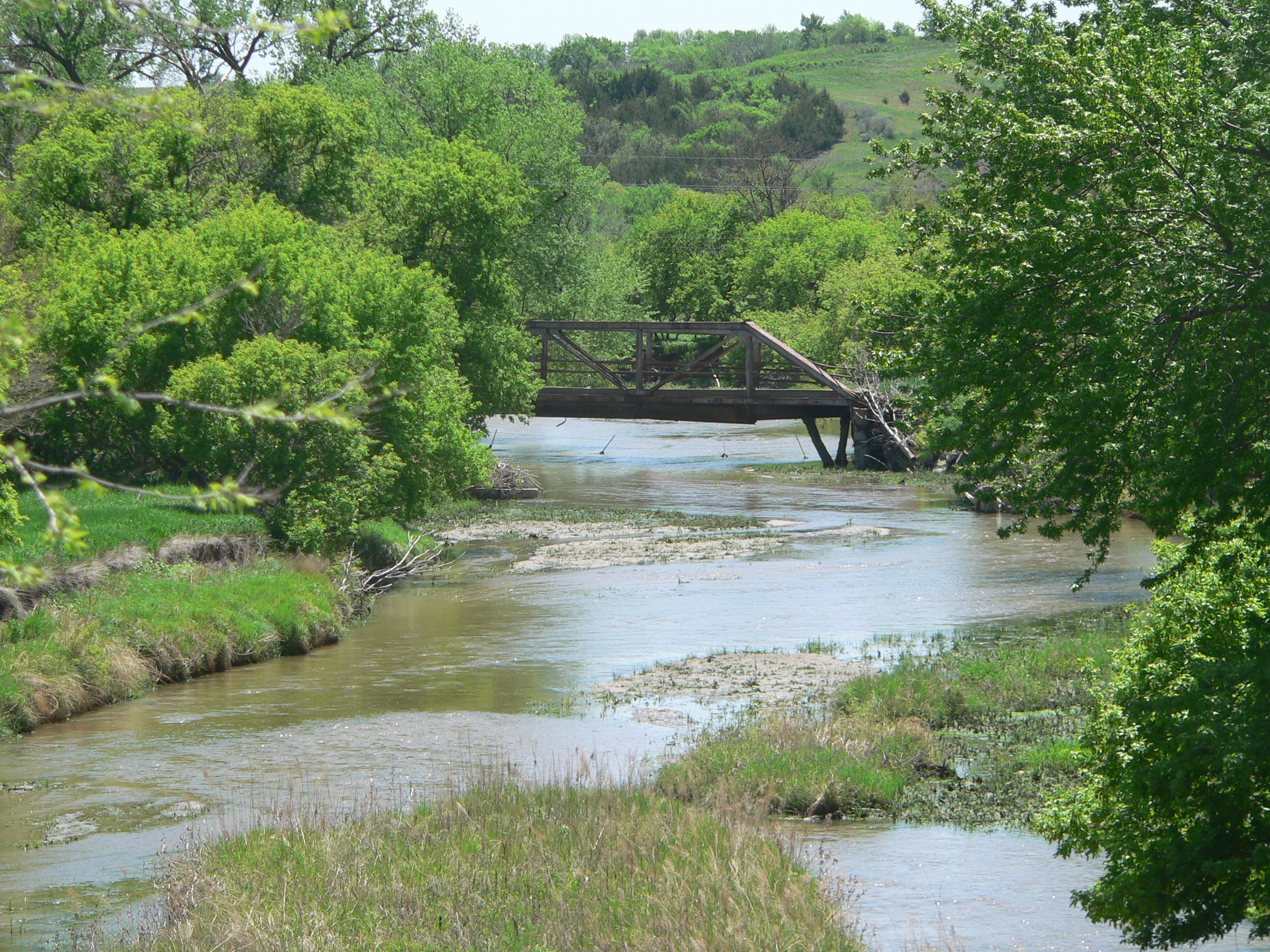
- Ponca Creek near Lynch, Nebraska

- Location of mouth
- Etymology: Ponca Indian tribe

Location
- Country: United States
- States: South Dakota, Nebraska

Physical characteristics
- Mouth
  - location: Missouri River
  - elevation: 1,217 ft (371 m)
- Length: 139 mi (224 km)
- Basin size: 810 mi^{2} (2,100 km^{2})

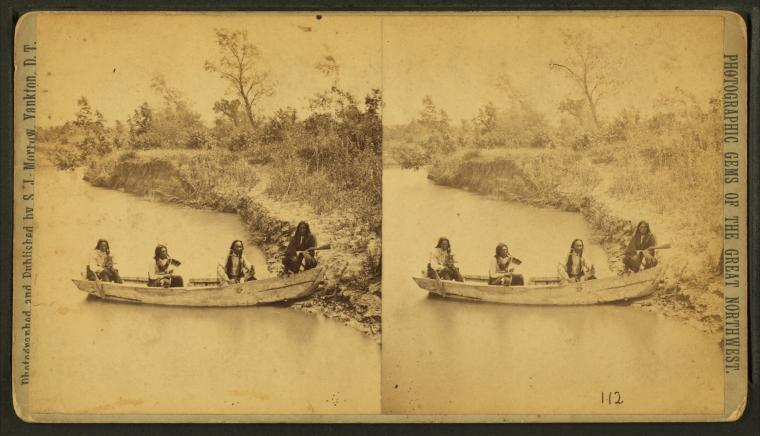
Four Indian men in a boat on Ponca creek (c. 1870–1880).

Ponca Creek is a stream that flows from southern South Dakota and into northern Nebraska. It is 139 miles (224 km) long. Its source is about 4 miles (6.4 km) west of U.S. 183, near Colome. It flows into the Missouri River 6 miles (9.7 km) northwest of Niobrara. Ponca Creek starts out going east, then takes a southeast direction, which continues until around Bristow, Nebraska, where it turns east again until it flows into the Missouri River. The entire Ponca Creek watershed drains 520,000 acres (2,100 km^{2}). The watershed stretches from central Tripp County to central Gregory County.

Ponca Creek takes its name from the Ponca people, who are indigenous to the region and in whose nation the creek flowed.

== Towns along the creek ==
The towns in the Ponca Creek watershed in South Dakota are Colome, Dallas, Gregory, Burke, Herrick, and St. Charles. The towns along Ponca Creek in Nebraska are Anoka, Spencer, Bristow, Lynch, Monowi, and Verdel.

== Named tributaries ==
The named tributaries of Ponca Creek are Masdon Creek, Murphy Creek, Blue Eyes Creek, Hay Creek, Willow Creek, Squaw Creek, Dizzy Creek, Dry Creek, Tobacco Creek, Spring Creek, Crooked Creek, Beaver Creek, Whiskey Creek, and Dewey Creek.

Ponca Creek does not flow into any lakes.

== See also ==
- List of rivers of Nebraska
- List of rivers of South Dakota
- Niobrara River
- Keya Paha River

== Sources ==
- U.S. Geological Survey. National Hydrography Dataset high-resolution flowline data. The National Map. Retrieved 7/11/13.
- Ponca Creek- South Dakota Department of Environment and Natural Resources. Retrieved 7/11/13.
- "Ponca Creek". Geographic Names Information System. United States Geological Survey, United States Department of the Interior.
