= Cairo, Nebraska =

Village in Hall County, Nebraska, United STates

- Village
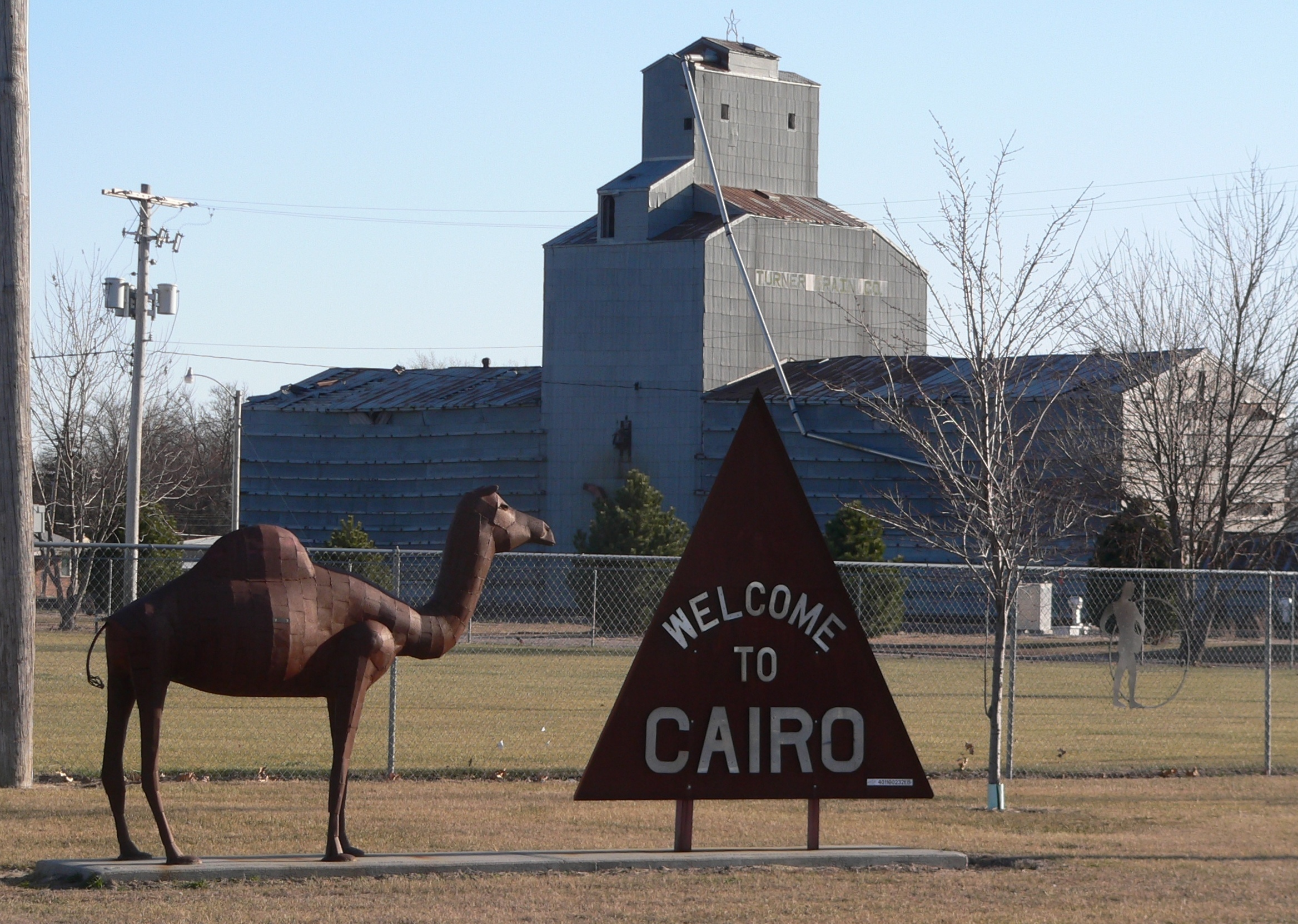
- Welcome sign on Nebraska Highway 11 at northern edge of Cairo, December 2009

- Logo
- Motto: "Oasis of the Prairie"
- Location of Cairo, Nebraska
- Coordinates: 41°00′17″N 98°36′02″W
- Country: United States
- State: Nebraska
- County: Hall
- Townships: Mayfield, South Loup
- Founded: 1886
- Incorporated: 1892

Area
  - Total: 0.95 sq mi (2.47 km^{2})
  - Land: 0.95 sq mi (2.47 km^{2})
  - Water: 0 sq mi (0.00 km^{2})
- Elevation: 1,952 ft (595 m)

Population (2020)
  - Total: 822
  - Density: 862.8/sq mi (333.11/km^{2})
- Time zone: UTC-6 (Central (CST))
  - Summer (DST): UTC-5 (CDT)
- ZIP code: 68824
- Area code: 308
- FIPS code: 31-07625
- GNIS feature ID: 2397524
- Website: cairocommunity.com

Cairo (/ˈkɛəroʊ/ KAIR-oh) is a village in Hall County, Nebraska, United States. The population was 822 at the 2020 census. It is part of the Grand Island, Nebraska Micropolitan Statistical Area.

== History ==
Cairo was established in 1886 when the Grand Island and Wyoming Central Railroad was extended to that point. It was named after Cairo, the capital of Egypt. Many of the town's street names reinforce the "Egyptian" theme.

Cairo was incorporated as a village in 1892.

== Geography ==
According to the United States Census Bureau, the village has a total area of 0.77 square miles (1.99 km^{2}), all land.

== Demographics ==
Historical population
Census	Pop.	Note	%±
1900	224		—
1910	364		62.5%
1920	427		17.3%
1930	425		−0.5%
1940	411		−3.3%
1950	422		2.7%
1960	503		19.2%
1970	686		36.4%
1980	737		7.4%
1990	733		−0.5%
2000	790		7.8%
2010	785		−0.6%
2020	822		4.7%
U.S. Decennial Census

=== 2010 census ===
As of the census of 2010, there were 785 people, 308 households, and 225 families residing in the village. The population density was 1,019.5 inhabitants per square mile (393.6/km^{2}). There were 337 housing units at an average density of 437.7 per square mile (169.0/km^{2}). The racial makeup of the village was 96.8% White, 0.4% African American, 0.3% Native American, 1.5% from other races, and 1.0% from two or more races. Hispanic or Latino of any race were 2.4% of the population.

There were 308 households, of which 33.4% had children under the age of 18 living with them, 61.7% were married couples living together, 7.5% had a female householder with no husband present, 3.9% had a male householder with no wife present, and 26.9% were non-families. 24.0% of all households were made up of individuals, and 12% had someone living alone who was 65 years of age or older. The average household size was 2.55 and the average family size was 3.04.

The median age in the village was 36.9 years. 27.8% of residents were under the age of 18; 6.7% were between the ages of 18 and 24; 25.4% were from 25 to 44; 25.6% were from 45 to 64; and 14.5% were 65 years of age or older. The gender makeup of the village was 49.8% male and 50.2% female.

=== 2000 census ===
As of the census of 2000, there were 790 people, 295 households, and 218 families residing in the village. The population density was 1,467.0 inhabitants per square mile (566.4/km^{2}). There were 316 housing units at an average density of 586.8 per square mile (226.6/km^{2}). The racial makeup of the village was 98.73% White, 0.63% from other races, and 0.63% from two or more races. Hispanic or Latino of any race were 2.28% of the population.

There were 295 households, out of which 40.0% had children under the age of 18 living with them, 64.7% were married couples living together, 7.1% had a female householder with no husband present, and 26.1% were non-families. 22.7% of all households were made up of individuals, and 14.2% had someone living alone who was 65 years of age or older. The average household size was 2.68 and the average family size was 3.14.

The median age in Cairo was 36 years. The population distribution was: 30.0% under the age of 18, 8.6% from 18 to 24, 26.7% from 25 to 44, 20.4% from 45 to 64, and 14.3% aged 65 years or older. For every 100 females, there were 90.8 males. For every 100 females age 18 and over, there were 88.7 males.

As of 2000 the median income for a household in the village was $35,500, and the median income for a family was $43,854. Males had a median income of $27,400 versus $19,792 for females. The per capita income for the village was $15,938 and about 8.5% of families and 10.8% of the population were below the poverty line, including 12.8% of those under age 18 and 20.4% of those age 65 or over.

== See also ==
- List of municipalities in Nebraska
