= List of highways numbered 95 =

Route 95, or Highway 95, may refer to routes in the following countries:

== International ==
- E95 European route E95

== Australia ==
- Great Northern Highway (Western Australia)
- Fossickers Way (New South Wales)

== Canada ==
- British Columbia Highway 95
- New Brunswick Route 95
- Winnipeg Route 95

== Germany ==
- A 95 (Bundesautobahn 95)
- B 95 (Bundesstraße 95)

== Greece ==
- EO95 road

== Iran ==
- Road 95

== Mexico ==
- Mexican Federal Highway 95

== New Zealand ==
- New Zealand State Highway 95

== Poland ==
- DK 95 (National road 95)

== Saudi Arabia ==
- Highway 95 (Abu Hadriyah Highway)

== United States ==
- Interstate 95
- U.S. Route 95
- Alabama State Route 95
  - County Route 95 (Houston County, Alabama)
  - County Route 95 (Lee County, Alabama)
- Arizona State Route 95
- Arkansas Highway 95
- California State Route 95 (1934) (former)
- Colorado State Highway 95
- Florida State Road 95
  - County Road 95A (Escambia County, Florida)
- Georgia State Route 95
- Hawaii Route 95
- Illinois Route 95
- K-95 (Kansas highway)
- Kentucky Route 95
- Louisiana Highway 95
- Maine State Route 95 (former)
- Maryland Route 95 (former)
- M-95 (Michigan highway)
- Minnesota State Highway 95
- Missouri Route 95
- Nebraska Highway 95
- New Jersey Route 95M
  - New Jersey Route 95W
- New Mexico State Road 95
- New York State Route 95
  - County Route 95 (Dutchess County, New York)
  - County Route 95 (Erie County, New York)
  - County Route 95 (Herkimer County, New York)
  - County Route 95 (Jefferson County, New York)
  - County Route 95 (Onondaga County, New York)
  - County Route 95 (Rensselaer County, New York)
  - County Route 95 (Rockland County, New York)
  - County Route 95 (Saratoga County, New York)
  - County Route 95 (Steuben County, New York)
  - County Route 95 (Suffolk County, New York)
- North Carolina Highway 95 (former)
  - North Carolina Highway 95A (former)
- Ohio State Route 95
- Oklahoma State Highway 95
- Pennsylvania Route 95 (former)
- Rhode Island Route 95 (former)
- South Carolina Highway 95 (pre-1937) (former)
- Tennessee State Route 95
- Texas State Highway 95
- Texas State Highway Spur 95
- Farm to Market Road 95
- Utah State Route 95
- Virginia State Route 95 (former)
- West Virginia Route 95
- Wisconsin Highway 95
- Wyoming Highway 95

== See also ==
- A95
- N95
- P95

Preceded by 94	Lists of highways 95	Succeeded by 96
