= South Dakota Highway 43 =

State highway in South Dakota, United States

Highway 43

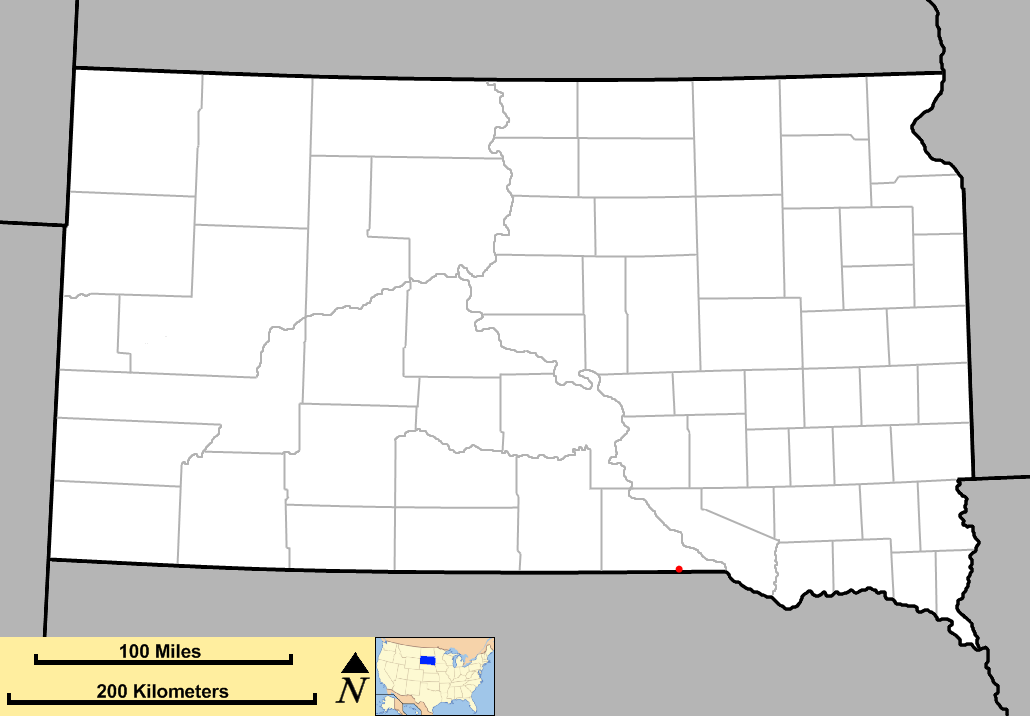
- Location of SD 43 (in red)

Route information
- Maintained by SDDOT
- Length: 1.131 mi (1.820 km)
- Existed: 1976–present

Major junctions
- South end: N-11 at the Nebraska state line south of Fairfax
- North end: US 18 near Fairfax

Location
- Country: United States
- State: South Dakota
- Counties: Gregory

Highway system
- South Dakota State Trunk Highway System; Interstate; US; State
← SD 42	→ SD 44

South Dakota Highway 43 (SD 43) is a 1.131-mile-long (1.820 km) state highway that exists entirely in the southern part of Gregory County in the southern part of the U.S. state of South Dakota. It begins as an extension of Nebraska Highway 11 (N-11) at the Nebraska state line south of Fairfax. It travels northwest to an intersection with U.S. Route 18 (US 18) south-southwest of the town.

== Route description ==
SD 43 begins at the Nebraska state line as a continuation of N-11. It travels northwest for just over 1 mile (1.6 km) before meeting its northern terminus at an intersection with US 18. The highway does not travel through any populated areas, but rather serves as a connector route between N-11 and US 18.

== History ==
The first road designated as SD 43 was around 1932, in Platte. It traveled east before heading south to travel through Geddes, ending at US 18 west of Lake Andes. This segment, previously part of SD 45, was given a separate number when SD 45 was rerouted south from Platte. By 1935, it was extended to the north and west, assuming the routing of SD 47 when the latter highway was relocated west of the Missouri River; its northern terminus was at the intersection of US 16 in Pukwana (in Brule County). The number was removed around 1940, when SD 50 was extended northwest from its previous terminus near Ravinia (east of Lake Andes).

The present day SD 43 was initially a segment of US 281. That highway's entrance into South Dakota was moved about 9 miles (14 km) to the east, by 1962. The old alignment was unnumbered until 1976, when it given its current assignment.

== Major intersections ==
The entire route is in Fairfax Township, Gregory County.

mi	km	Destinations	Notes
0.000	0.000	N-11 south / Lewis and Clark Trail – Butte	Continuation into Nebraska
1.131	1.820	US 18 / Lewis and Clark Trail – Burke, Lake Andes	
1.000 mi = 1.609 km; 1.000 km = 0.621 mi
