= Edna Sieh =

American politician

Member of the South Dakota House of Representatives from the 29th district
- In office October 20, 1986 – January 1987
- Preceded by: Harold Sieh
- Succeeded by: Albert Schramm

Personal details
- Born: Edna Fuhrman; April 12, 1912 Herrick, South Dakota
- Died: December 12, 2014 (aged 102) Winner, South Dakota
- Party: Republican

Edna Sieh (née Fuhrman, April 12, 1912 – December 12, 2014) was an American politician who served in the South Dakota House of Representatives as a Republican.

== Biography ==
Sieh was born on April 12, 1912, in Herrick, South Dakota. She married her husband Harold Sieh, who would also go on to become a state representative, on June 9, 1934. Sieh worked as a teacher in Gregory County, South Dakota.

Harold died on September 9, 1986. Edna Sieh was appointed to replace her husband in the House of Representatives by Governor Bill Janklow on October 20, 1986. She represented the 29th district. Because it was too close to the election to remove Harold Sieh's name from the ballot, she was not listed on the ballot for the November 4 election, and was consequently not re-elected.

Sieh died on December 12, 2014, in Winner, South Dakota. She was 102.
