= Nebraska Highway 68 =

State highway in Nebraska, U.S.

State Highway 68

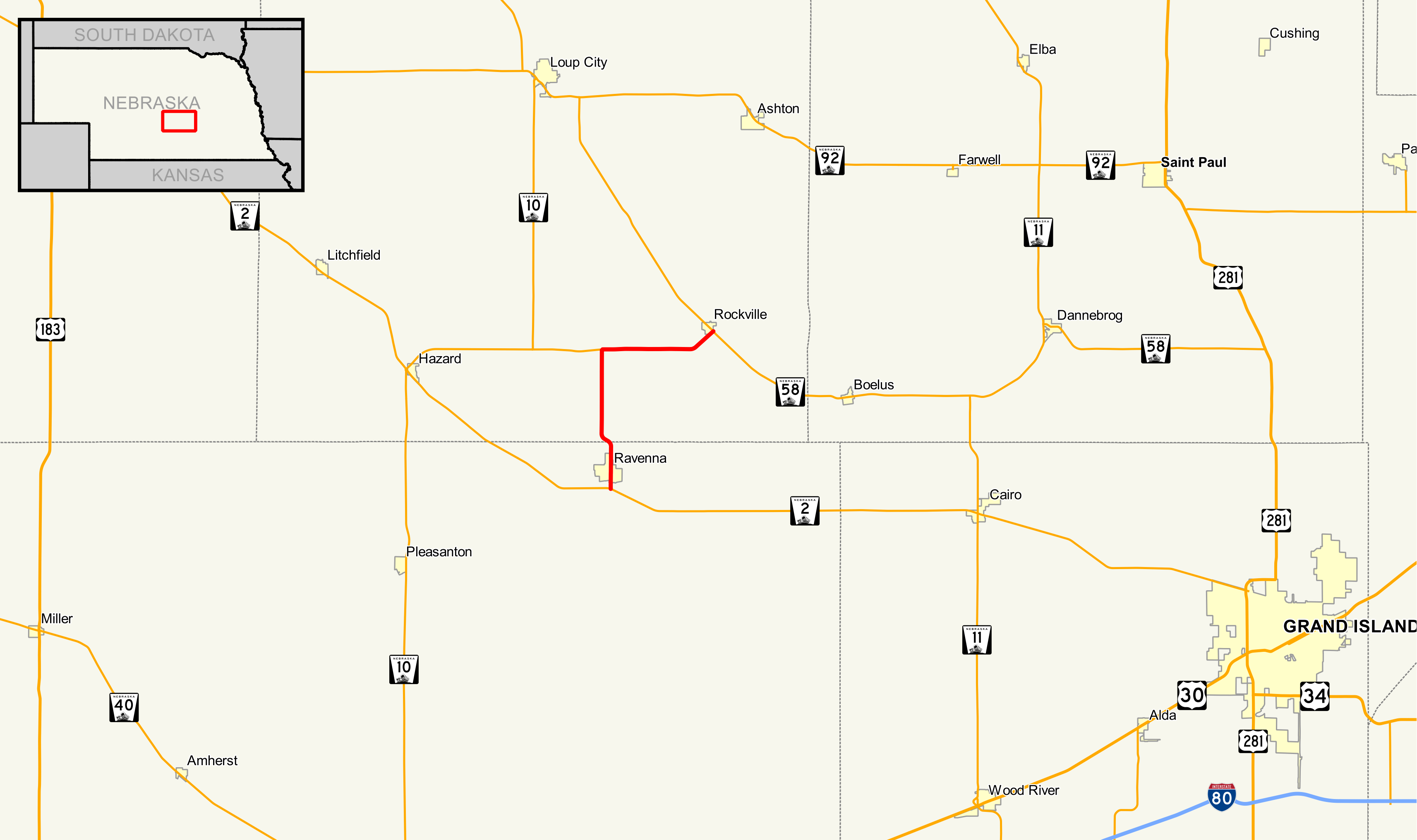
- Nebraska Highway 68 highlighted in red

Route information
- Maintained by NDOT
- Length: 11.34 mi (18.25 km)
- Existed: 1935–present

Major junctions
- West end: N-2 south of Ravenna
- East end: N-58 in Rockville

Location
- Country: United States
- State: Nebraska
- Counties: Buffalo, Sherman

Highway system
- Nebraska State Highway System; Interstate; US; State; Link; Spur; State Spurs; Recreation
← N-67	→ N-69

Nebraska Highway 68 is a highway in central Nebraska. Its western terminus is at an intersection with Nebraska Highway 2 just south of Ravenna. Its eastern terminus is at an intersection with Nebraska Highway 58 in Rockville.

== Route description ==
Nebraska Highway 68 begins just outside the southern border of Ravenna at an intersection with NE 2. It heads directly northward through Ravenna, then turns to the northwest just outside the city before continuing to head north. Further north, it meets NE 82A before turning directly to the east. The highway then head in a final northeasterly direction into Rockville where it will terminate at an intersection with NE 58.

== Major intersections ==
County	Location	mi	km	Destinations	Notes
Buffalo	Ravenna	0.00	0.00	N-2	Western terminus
Sherman		6.22	10.01	L-82A west	
Sherman	Rockville	11.34	18.25	N-58	Eastern terminus
1.000 mi = 1.609 km; 1.000 km = 0.621 mi
