= Herrick Elevator =

- U.S. National Register of Historic Places
- U.S. Historic district
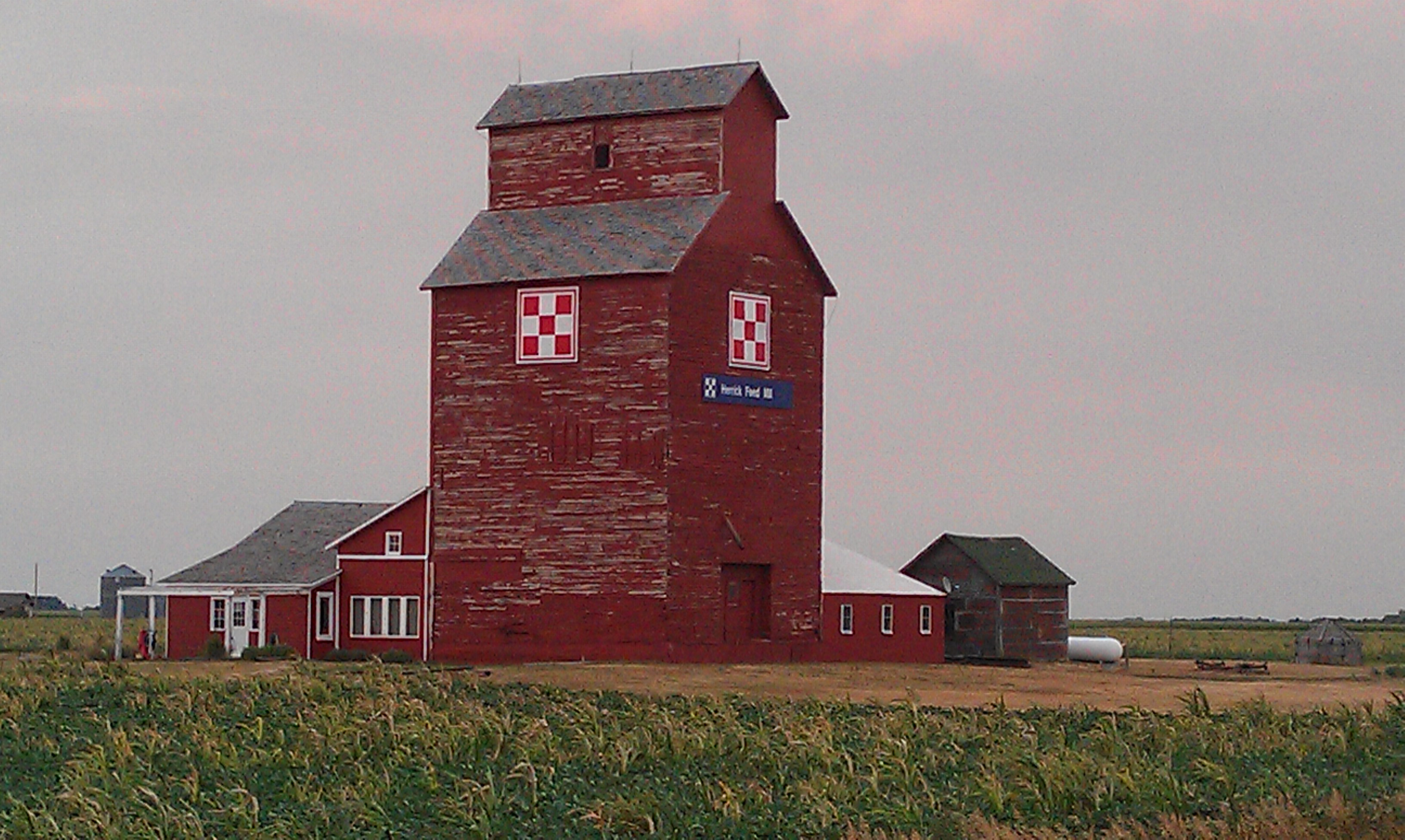

- Location within South Dakota Location within the United States
- Location: US 18, Herrick, South Dakota
- Coordinates: 43°7′26″N 99°10′58″W
- Area: 3.3 acres (1.3 ha)
- Built: 1907
- Built by: Caspary and Simons
- NRHP reference No.: 03000498
- Added to NRHP: May 30, 2003

Herrick Elevator is a grain elevator in Herrick, South Dakota. It was built in 1907, and added to the National Register of Historic Places in 2003. The elevator was in service until 1998. It has since been restored along with the attached shed that has been converted into lodgings.

== See also ==
- National Register of Historic Places listings in Gregory County, South Dakota
