= Nebraska Highway 58 =

State highway in Nebraska, U.S.

State Highway 58

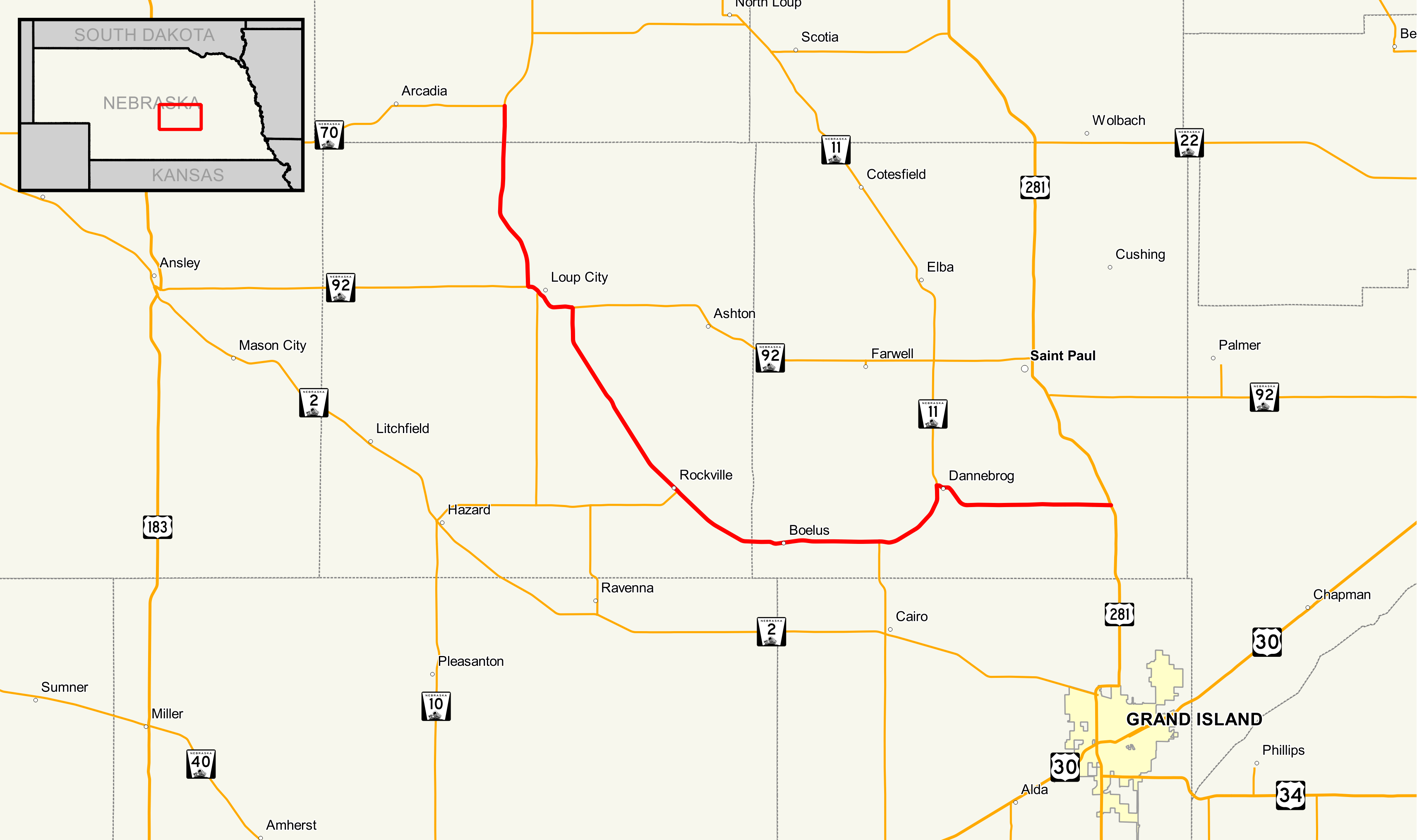
- Nebraska Highway 58 highlighted in red

Route information
- Maintained by NDOT
- Length: 52.73 mi (84.86 km)
- Existed: 1926–present

Major junctions
- South end: US 281 south of St. Paul
- N-11 in Dannebrog; N-68 in Rockville; N-92 at Loup City
- North end: N-70 east of Arcadia

Location
- Country: United States
- State: Nebraska
- Counties: Valley, Sherman, Howard

Highway system
- Nebraska State Highway System; Interstate; US; State; Link; Spur; State Spurs; Recreation
← N-57	→ N-59

Nebraska Highway 58 is a highway in Nebraska. It has a length of 53 miles (85 km). Much of the route lies near the Loup River. The southern terminus is at an intersection with U.S. Highway 281 south of St. Paul. The northern terminus is at an intersection with Nebraska Highway 70 east of Arcadia.

== Route description ==
Nebraska Highway 58 begins at U.S. Route 281 near St. Libory, heading west through farmland. At Dannebrog, the road forms a concurrency with Nebraska Highway 11 and heads southwest. The two roads split and Highway 58 heads west as it passes through Boelus. In Rockville, the road intersects Nebraska Highway 68 and turns northwest. In Loup City, Highway 58 becomes concurrent with Nebraska Highway 92 and turns west, intersecting Nebraska Highway 10. Past Loup City, Highway 58 splits from Highway 92 and continues north to its terminus near Arcadia at Nebraska Highway 70.

== Major intersections ==
County	Location	mi	km	Destinations	Notes
Howard	St. Libory	0.00	0.00	US 281	Southern terminus
Howard	Dannebrog	10.12	16.29	N-11 north (Naper Road)	South end of N-11 overlap
Howard		15.17	24.41	N-11 south (Rose Road)	North end of N-11 overlap
Sherman	Rockville	27.33	43.98	N-68 west	
Sherman	Loup City	39.33	63.30	N-92 east	South end of N-92 overlap
Sherman	Loup City	41.58	66.92	R-82B east (O Street) / N-10 south – Sherman Reservoir State Recreation Area	Northern terminus of N-10; western terminus of R-82B
Sherman	Loup City	42.30	68.08	N-92 west	North end of N-92 overlap
Valley		52.73	84.86	N-70	Northern terminus
1.000 mi = 1.609 km; 1.000 km = 0.621 mi: Concurrency terminus
