= Mary Turner =

Mary Turner may refer to:

- Mary Turner (lynching victim) (1885–1918), African-American victim of lynching in Valdosta, Georgia
- Mary Turner (trade unionist) (1938–2017), Irish trade unionist
- Mary Turner Cook (c. 1863–1950), wife of Australian Prime Minister Joseph Cook
- Mary Lou Turner (born 1947), American country music artist
- Mary Elizabeth Turner (1854–1907), English embroiderer
- Mary Elizabeth Turner Salter (1856–1938), American soprano and composer
- Mary Kathleen Turner (born 1954), American actress and director
- Mary Dawson Turner (1774–1850), English artist
- Mary Turner (businesswoman) (born 1958), CEO of Koovs
- Mary Turner Shaw (1906–1990), Australian architect
- Mary Daniel Turner (1925–2010), American Catholic sister
- Mary Turner (puppeteer) (born 1933), British puppeteer
