= Harold Sieh =

Member of the South Dakota House of Representatives from the 29th district
- In office 1985 – September 9, 1986
- Succeeded by: Edna Sieh

Member of the South Dakota House of Representatives from the 24th district
- In office 1973–1985

Member of the South Dakota House of Representatives from the 8th district
- In office 1971–1973

Personal details
- Born: December 29, 1912 Naper, Nebraska
- Died: September 9, 1986 (aged 73) Herrick, South Dakota
- Party: Republican

Harold Sieh (December 29, 1912 – September 9, 1986) was an American politician. He served as a member of the South Dakota House of Representatives from 1971 until his death in 1986.

== Biography ==
Sieh was born December 29, 1912 in Naper, Nebraska. He married Edna Sieh on June 9, 1934.

He first became a representative in 1970, when he won election in the 8th district as one of two members of the state House, alongside Democrat Donald Jorgenson. Following redistricting after the 1970 United States census, Sieh ran for office in the newly-created 24th district and won re-election.

In 1981, Sieh became co-chairman of the Joint Appropriations Committee in the South Dakota Legislature, a committee he had been a member of since his election in 1970. In 1984, he was redistricted into the 29th district, where he also won re-election.

Sieh died at his home on September 9, 1986. He was found by his wife, Edna, and was assumed to have died of a heart attack. Sieh had already filed for re-election that year, but because he died two months before the November 4 election, it was too late to remove his name from the ballot. Sieh ultimately came in third place in the election, receiving 2,250 votes despite being deceased.
