= Anita Caspary =

American Christian leader (1915–2011)

Personal life
- Born: November 4, 1915 Herrick, South Dakota, U.S
- Died: October 5, 2011 (aged 95) Los Angeles, California, U.S.
- Website: anitacaspary.com

Religious life
- Religion: Christianity

Anita M. Caspary, IHM (November 4, 1915, in Herrick, South Dakota – October 5, 2011, in Los Angeles, California) was an American former religious sister and later the president of an ecumenical Christian community. Under her leadership as Mother General, over 300 sisters relinquished their canonical status as Sisters of the Immaculate Heart of Mary and formed the new Immaculate Heart Community of California.

Caspary and her former IHM sisters organized the new Immaculate Heart Community as an independent religious entity. They are a religious community without any official church affiliation. The majority remained lay Catholics. In addition to her leadership role with the Immaculate Heart Community, Caspary was president of Immaculate Heart College (1958–63), English professor, popular teacher and lecturer, published author and poet.

Acknowledged as a transformative leader in the post Vatican II Catholic Church, she was featured on the cover of Time magazine, February 23, 1970.

== Biography ==
Caspary taught high school English while studying toward a master's degree in English at the University of Southern California (1942). She received a doctorate in English from Stanford University (1948). Returning from Stanford, she rose quickly in the ranks of academic leadership to chair of the English department (1950) and graduate dean of the college. She envisioned a scholarly life in English literature and Catholic intellectual life in the IHM community.

In 1957, Caspary became the president of Immaculate Heart College (IHC). She attended the Presidents’ Professional Association Management Course for Presidents and received a certificate of participation in 1964. In 1966 she received a certificate of completion from the American Management Association's Executive Action Course. In both management training programs, she was a rare women participant.

In 1963, Caspary was elected Mother General of the Immaculate Heart Sisters, and led the community in the renewal process of Vatican II. In her award-winning book Witness to Integrity: The Crisis of the Immaculate Heart Community of California she described the struggle, conflict and choice of the IHM women to form a new community. Of that period of her life, she wrote, "In many ways, we foreshadowed the contemporary (and vibrant) feminist movement within the Catholic Church". Anita had the unique distinction of being a Mother General of a congregation of Catholic sisters and a president of an ecumenical community. For this, she was featured on the cover of TIME magazine, February 23, 1970.

In the seventies, she was a sought after scholar and lecturer. She attended Harvard University's Divinity School in the early 1970s as the first woman who received the Merrill Fellowship. From 1973-1975, she participated in Notre Dame University's theology program. Following these positions she taught at the Graduate Theological Union in Berkeley, CA. She was also a visiting professor in the School of Religion at the University of Southern California in Los Angeles, CA.

In the 1980s, she was the first director of the Peace and Justice Center of Southern CA and started the annual Wholistic Retreat for Women which continues today. In the nineties she taught courses in the Feminist Spirituality Program of Immaculate Heart College Center. At the age of 85 she was awarded a grant to teach poetry to the IHM members at the Kenmore residence and learned to use the computer. At age 95, she had completed a volume of her poetry and was anticipating publication.

Caspary died on October 5, 2011, in Los Angeles, California.

== Publications ==
- Witness to Integrity (2003), memoir
- FROM THE HEART: Poems by Anita M. Caspary, I.H.M. (2012), poetry

== Notes ==
a. Immaculate Heart College of Los Angeles, CA closed in 1980.

== Sources ==
- Caspary, Anita M. (2003). Witness to Integrity: The Crisis of the Immaculate Heart Community of California. Collegeville, Minnesota: The Liturgical Press. ISBN 978-0-81462-770-9.
- Maloney, Susan M. (2008). "The First Feminist Nuns: The Immaculate Heart Community of California". In Dresdner, Lisa; Peterson, Laurel (eds.). (Re) Interpretations: The Shapes of Justice in Women's Experience. London, UK: Cambridge Scholars Publishing. pp. 151–167. ISBN 978-1-84718-976-9.
- Maloney, Susan M. (2005) "The Choices Before Us: Anita Caspary and the Immaculate Heart Community." In Umansky, Lauri; Avital (eds.). Impossible to Hold: Women and Culture in the 1960s. New York: New York University Press. pp. 177–195. ISBN 978-0-81479-909-3.
- Maloney, Susan M. (Fall 2014). "Obedience, Responsibility, and Freedom: Anita M. Caspary, IHM, and the Post-Conciliar Renewal of Catholic Women Religious". U.S. Catholic Historian. 32 (4): 121–150. doi:10.1353/cht.2014.0029. S2CID 145074605.
- Massa, Mark. S. (2010). The American Catholic Revolution: How the Sixties Changed the Church Forever. New York: Oxford University Press. p. 90. ISBN 978-0-19973-412-2.
- "A Woman of Courage and Commitment". Anita M. Caspary Trust.
- James Patrick Shannon, Reluctant Dissenter (New York: The Crossroad Publishing Co., 1998), 130.
- Mark S. Massa, SJ, “The Dangers of History” in The American Catholic Revolution: How the Sixties Changed the Church Forever (New York: Oxford University Press, 2010), 75–102;
- Mark S. Massa, SJ “To Be Beautiful, Human, and Christian—The IHM Nuns and the Routinization of Charisma,” in Catholics and American Culture (New York: Crossroad Publishing Co., 1999), 172–194.
- Nan Deane Cano, IHM. Take Heart: Growing as a Faith Community - The Immaculate Heart Community of California (New York: Paulist Press, 2016)
- Lora Ann Quinonez, CDP, and Mary Daniel Turner, SNDdeN, The Transformation of American Catholic Sisters (Philadelphia: Temple University Press, 1992), 42.
- Marshall Mercer, “‘You People Don't Pray Right’: A Study of Organizational Power and Superordinate Goal Conflict” (Ph.D. dissertation, Claremont Graduate School, 1994),
- Marcelle Bernstein, The Nuns (New York: J.B. Lippincott, 1976), 149–154.
- Three documentary films detail the conflict: “Nuns in Conflict” (Man Alive series, British Broadcasting Corporation, 1968), “Lamp Unto My Feet” (CBS TV, 1970) and "Rebel Hearts" (Rebel Hearts Film, 2021) .

== Externals links ==
- Official website
