= Amelia, Nebraska =

Unincorporated community in Nebraska, United States

- Unincorporated community
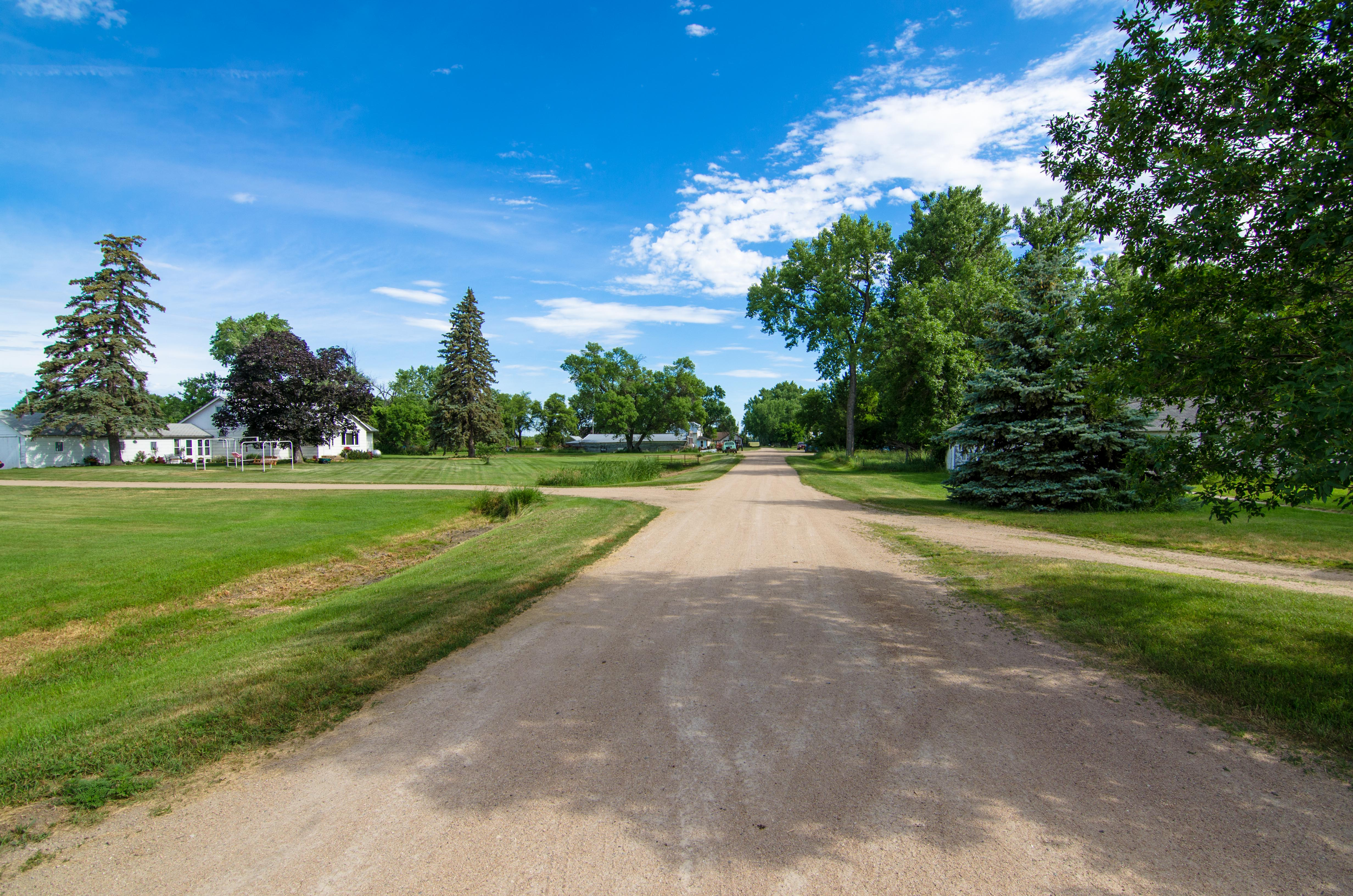
- Iris Avenue in Amelia

- Location within the state of Nebraska
- Coordinates: 42°14′08″N 98°54′43″W
- Country: United States
- State: Nebraska
- County: Holt
- Elevation: 2,182 ft (665 m)
- Time zone: UTC-6 (Central (CST))
  - Summer (DST): UTC-5 (CDT)
- ZIP code: 68711
- FIPS code: 31-01185
- GNIS feature ID: 826975

Amelia is an unincorporated community in southwestern Holt County, Nebraska, United States. It lies along local roads near Nebraska Highways 11 and 95, southwest of the city of O'Neill, the county seat of Holt County. The community is named for Amelia A. Bliss. Although Amelia is unincorporated, it has a post office, with the ZIP code of 68711.

== Notable people ==
- Jon Doolittle, singer/songwriter
