= N95 (disambiguation) =

An N95 is a particulate-filtering respirator.

N95 may also refer to:

- N95 (Long Island bus), in New York
- "N95" (song), by Kendrick Lamar, 2022
- HMS Unique (N95), a submarine of the Royal Navy
- N-95 National Highway, in Pakistan
- Nebraska Highway 95, in the United States
- Nokia N95, a smartphone
