= Kathy Lou Schultz =

American poet (born 1966)

- Born: November 30, 1966 (age 59)
- Education: Kearney High School; Columbia University; Oberlin College; San Francisco State University (MFA); University of Pennsylvania (PhD)
- Occupations: Author, poet

Kathy Lou Schultz (born November 30, 1966) is an American author and poet from Burke, South Dakota.

== Early life and education ==
She was born on November 30, 1966, to Lewis and Jeanne Schultz, who soon after moved the family to Kearney, Nebraska.

After graduating from Kearney High School, Schultz attended undergraduate programs at Columbia University and Oberlin College; she was of the first generation in her family to attend college. She also received an MFA in poetry and American literature at San Francisco State University and a PhD in English from the University of Pennsylvania, where her research interests included poetry and poetics, modernism, and African American literature.

== Career ==
Schultz spent a decade in the Bay area working on her poetry and prose, editing a journal of experimental literature titled Lipstick Eleven, and working in the publishing industry. She relocated to Philadelphia in 2000, where she completed a PhD in literature at the University of Pennsylvania in 2006. Her monograph, The Afro-Modernist Epic and Literary History: Tolson, Hughes, Baraka was published in 2013 as part of the Modern and Contemporary Poetry and Poetics Series from Palgrave, edited by Rachel Blau DuPlessis. It was released in paperback in 2016.

Currently, Schultz is a professor in the English department at the University of Memphis, where she also is the Director of the Program in Women's and Gender Studies. Previously, she was Director of the English Honors Program. Her areas of interest includes African American poetry as well as the poetry of the African diaspora. She teaches courses in African American, American, and Afro-Diasporic literature; poetry and poetics; and modernism.

Schultz is an activist as well, working for a variety of feminist, anti-racist and peace movements since her youth, and actively organizing against the first Gulf War as part of the statewide, grassroots peace organization Nebraskans for Peace. She also worked at shelters for battered women and children in Harlem; Elyria, Ohio; and Lincoln, Nebraska.

== Poetry ==
- Re dress (San Francisco State University, 1994) selected for the Michael Rubin Award
- Genealogy (a+bend press, 1999)
- Some Vague Wife (Atelos Press, 2002)
- Biting Midge: Works in Prose (Belladonna, 2008)
