= Gregory, South Dakota =

- City
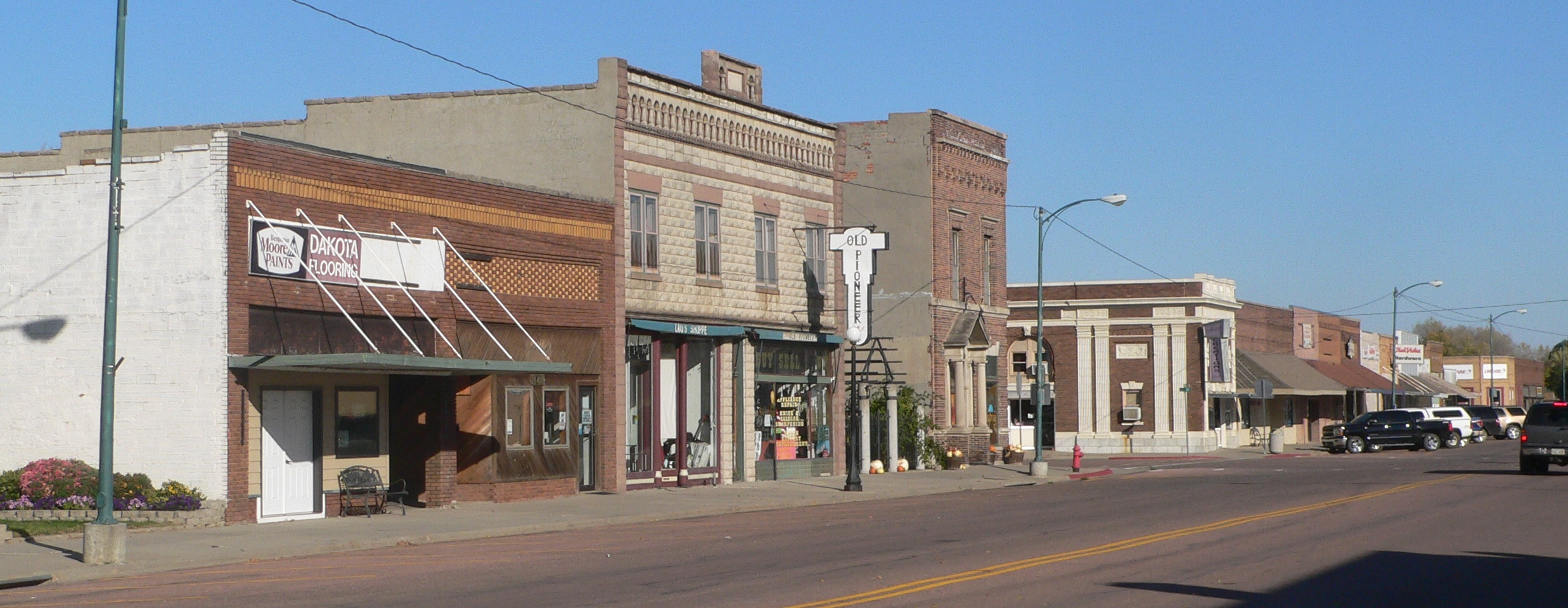
- Main Street

- Location in Gregory County and the state of South Dakota
- Coordinates: 43°13′48″N 99°25′15″W
- Country: United States
- State: South Dakota
- County: Gregory
- Incorporated: December 7, 1908

Government
  - Type: Aldermanic Form

Area
  - Total: 1.72 sq mi (4.46 km^{2})
  - Land: 1.72 sq mi (4.46 km^{2})
  - Water: 0 sq mi (0.00 km^{2})
- Elevation: 2,169 ft (661 m)

Population (2020)
  - Total: 1,221
  - Density: 709.4/sq mi (273.92/km^{2})
- Time zone: UTC−6 (Central (CST))
  - Summer (DST): UTC−5 (CDT)
- ZIP code: 57533
- Area code: 605
- FIPS code: 46-26180
- GNIS feature ID: 1267408
- Website: http://www.cityofgregory.com/

Gregory is a city in western Gregory County, South Dakota, United States. The population was 1,221 at the 2020 census.

== History ==
Gregory was laid out in 1904. The city took its name from its location in Gregory County. A post office called Gregory has been in operation since 1904. The local paper for Gregory and the surrounding county, the Gregory Times-Advocate, was founded in 1910.

On May 8, 1965, an F5 tornado touched down on the town without causing any fatalities.

== Geography ==
Gregory is located along U.S. Route 18 and South Dakota Highway 47 between Burke, seven miles to the southeast and Dallas, four miles to the west. Ponca Creek flows past Gregory, two miles to the south and the headwaters of South Fork Whetstone Creek lie to the northeast.

According to the United States Census Bureau, the city has a total area of 1.71 square miles (4.43 km^{2}), all land.

=== Climate ===
Climate data for Gregory, South Dakota (1991−2020 normals, extremes 1906−present)
Month	Jan	Feb	Mar	Apr	May	Jun	Jul	Aug	Sep	Oct	Nov	Dec	Year
Record high °F (°C)	71 (22)	76 (24)	91 (33)	98 (37)	103 (39)	107 (42)	114 (46)	113 (45)	105 (41)	97 (36)	85 (29)	79 (26)	114 (46)
Mean maximum °F (°C)	57.0 (13.9)	61.1 (16.2)	74.9 (23.8)	82.0 (27.8)	88.9 (31.6)	93.6 (34.2)	100.3 (37.9)	98.2 (36.8)	93.7 (34.3)	85.2 (29.6)	72.2 (22.3)	57.9 (14.4)	101.2 (38.4)
Mean daily maximum °F (°C)	31.6 (−0.2)	35.9 (2.2)	46.8 (8.2)	57.6 (14.2)	68.8 (20.4)	79.6 (26.4)	86.6 (30.3)	84.7 (29.3)	76.7 (24.8)	61.6 (16.4)	46.8 (8.2)	34.5 (1.4)	59.3 (15.2)
Daily mean °F (°C)	20.9 (−6.2)	24.5 (−4.2)	34.7 (1.5)	45.4 (7.4)	56.9 (13.8)	67.8 (19.9)	74.2 (23.4)	72.0 (22.2)	63.1 (17.3)	48.7 (9.3)	34.9 (1.6)	24.2 (−4.3)	47.3 (8.5)
Mean daily minimum °F (°C)	10.1 (−12.2)	13.1 (−10.5)	22.5 (−5.3)	33.3 (0.7)	45.0 (7.2)	55.9 (13.3)	61.7 (16.5)	59.3 (15.2)	49.6 (9.8)	35.7 (2.1)	23.0 (−5.0)	13.8 (−10.1)	35.3 (1.8)
Mean minimum °F (°C)	−12.1 (−24.5)	−7.9 (−22.2)	0.0 (−17.8)	17.0 (−8.3)	30.2 (−1.0)	43.0 (6.1)	50.2 (10.1)	47.2 (8.4)	33.7 (0.9)	18.4 (−7.6)	4.4 (−15.3)	−8.2 (−22.3)	−17.6 (−27.6)
Record low °F (°C)	−31 (−35)	−28 (−33)	−25 (−32)	−4 (−20)	16 (−9)	32 (0)	35 (2)	33 (1)	20 (−7)	3 (−16)	−24 (−31)	−36 (−38)	−36 (−38)
Average precipitation inches (mm)	0.55 (14)	0.75 (19)	1.34 (34)	3.12 (79)	4.13 (105)	4.18 (106)	2.99 (76)	3.14 (80)	2.41 (61)	2.36 (60)	0.95 (24)	0.74 (19)	26.66 (677)
Average snowfall inches (cm)	6.8 (17)	8.5 (22)	5.3 (13)	5.4 (14)	0.0 (0.0)	0.0 (0.0)	0.0 (0.0)	0.0 (0.0)	0.0 (0.0)	1.7 (4.3)	6.9 (18)	10.4 (26)	45.0 (114)
Average precipitation days (≥ 0.01 in)	3.4	4.3	5.4	8.2	10.4	10.0	7.4	7.1	6.3	6.0	4.2	4.0	76.7
Average snowy days (≥ 0.1 in)	2.9	3.6	2.4	1.4	0.0	0.0	0.0	0.0	0.0	0.6	1.8	3.1	15.8
Source: NOAA

== Demographics ==
Historical population
Census	Pop.	Note	%±
1910	1,142		—
1920	1,067		−6.6%
1930	1,034		−3.1%
1940	1,246		20.5%
1950	1,375		10.4%
1960	1,478		7.5%
1970	1,756		18.8%
1980	1,503		−14.4%
1990	1,486		−1.1%
2000	1,342		−9.7%
2010	1,295		−3.5%
2020	1,221		−5.7%
U.S. Decennial Census

=== 2020 census ===
As of the 2020 census, Gregory had a population of 1,221, and the median age was 46.3 years. 21.5% of residents were under the age of 18 and 27.6% were 65 years of age or older. For every 100 females there were 88.4 males, and for every 100 females age 18 and over there were 85.7 males age 18 and over.

0.0% of residents lived in urban areas, while 100.0% lived in rural areas.

There were 553 households in Gregory, of which 24.4% had children under the age of 18 living in them. Of all households, 40.0% were married-couple households, 21.2% were households with a male householder and no spouse or partner present, and 33.6% were households with a female householder and no spouse or partner present. About 42.5% of all households were made up of individuals and 21.9% had someone living alone who was 65 years of age or older.

There were 681 housing units, of which 18.8% were vacant. The homeowner vacancy rate was 4.6% and the rental vacancy rate was 17.2%.

Racial composition as of the 2020 census
Race	Number	Percent
White	1,066	87.3%
Black or African American	6	0.5%
American Indian and Alaska Native	86	7.0%
Asian	15	1.2%
Native Hawaiian and Other Pacific Islander	2	0.2%
Some other race	4	0.3%
Two or more races	42	3.4%
Hispanic or Latino (of any race)	17	1.4%

=== 2010 census ===
As of the census of 2010, there were 1,295 people, 611 households, and 326 families living in the city. The population density was 757.3 inhabitants per square mile (292.4/km^{2}). There were 730 housing units at an average density of 426.9 per square mile (164.8/km^{2}). The racial makeup of the city was 90.3% White, 0.2% African American, 6.8% Native American, 0.6% Asian, and 2.2% from two or more races. Hispanic or Latino of any race were 0.8% of the population.

There were 611 households, of which 23.9% had children under the age of 18 living with them, 39.4% were married couples living together, 10.5% had a female householder with no husband present, 3.4% had a male householder with no wife present, and 46.6% were non-families. 43.7% of all households were made up of individuals, and 25.9% had someone living alone who was 65 years of age or older. The average household size was 2.05 and the average family size was 2.82.

The median age in the city was 48.5 years. 21.8% of residents were under the age of 18; 6.8% were between the ages of 18 and 24; 17% were from 25 to 44; 28.1% were from 45 to 64; and 26.3% were 65 years of age or older. The gender makeup of the city was 47.8% male and 52.2% female.

=== 2000 census ===
As of the census of 2000, there were 1,342 people, 613 households, and 351 families living in the city. The population density was 982.6 inhabitants per square mile (379.4/km^{2}). There were 718 housing units at an average density of 525.7 per square mile (203.0/km^{2}). The racial makeup of the city was 95.68% White, 3.28% Native American, 0.07% Asian, 0.07% from other races, and 0.89% from two or more races. Hispanic or Latino of any race were 0.89% of the population.

There were 613 households, out of which 25.0% had children under the age of 18 living with them, 47.5% were married couples living together, 7.2% had a female householder with no husband present, and 42.6% were non-families. 40.0% of all households were made up of individuals, and 26.6% had someone living alone who was 65 years of age or older. The average household size was 2.19 and the average family size was 2.94.

In the city, the population was spread out, with 24.0% under the age of 18, 4.4% from 18 to 24, 21.7% from 25 to 44, 22.0% from 45 to 64, and 27.9% who were 65 years of age or older. The median age was 45 years. For every 100 females, there were 84.1 males. For every 100 females age 18 and over, there were 78.9 males.

As of 2000 the median income for a household in the city was $23,173, and the median income for a family was $31,250. Males had a median income of $25,057 versus $16,923 for females. The per capita income for the city was $13,626. About 12.9% of families and 18.8% of the population were below the poverty line, including 25.9% of those under age 18 and 20.7% of those age 65 or over.

== Notable person ==
- Oscar Micheaux, first major African-American feature filmmaker

== See also ==
- List of cities in South Dakota
