= Nebraska Highway 11 =

State highway in Nebraska, U.S.

State Highway 11

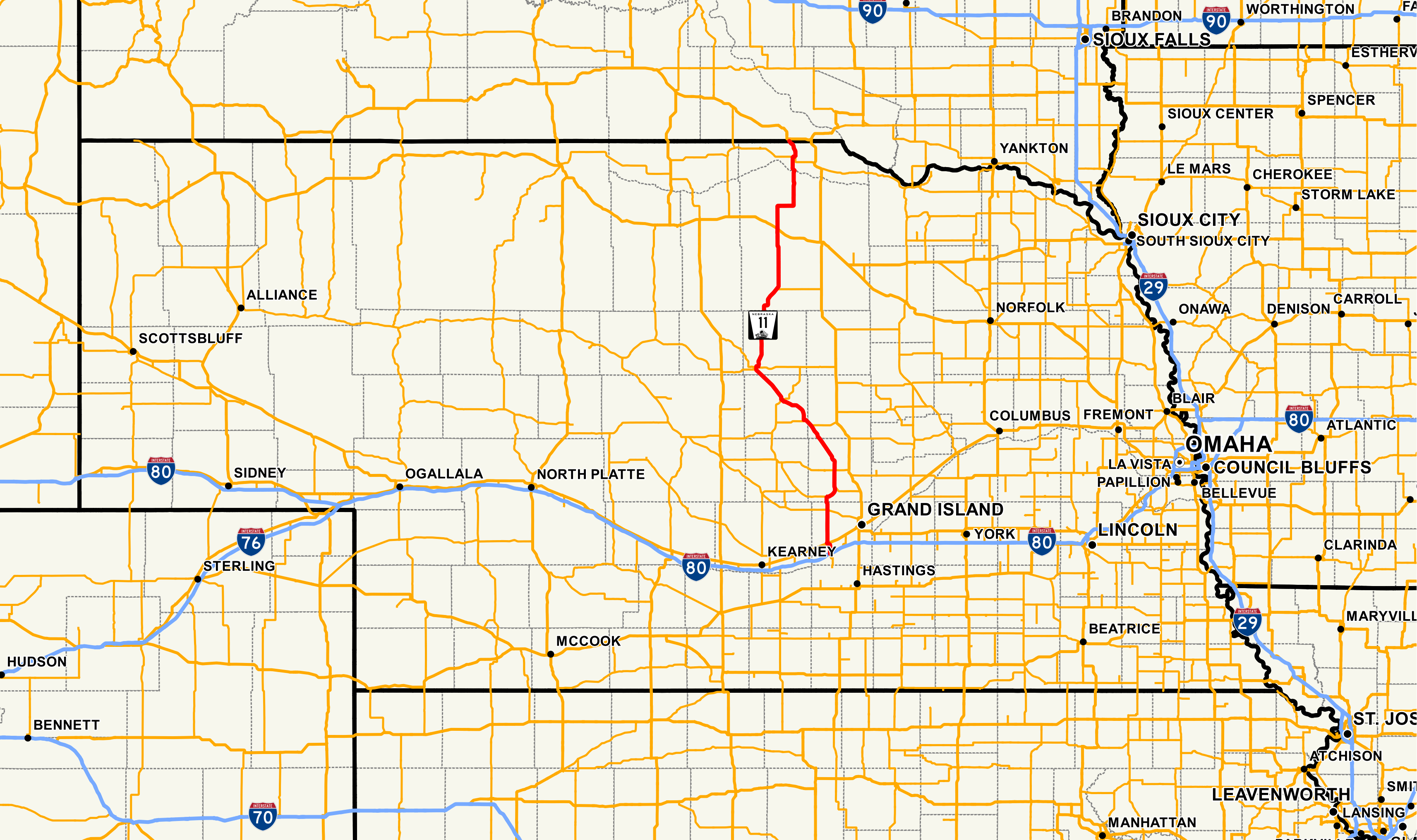
- Nebraska Highway 11 highlighted in red

Route information
- Maintained by NDOT
- Length: 183.66 mi (295.57 km)
- Existed: 1926–present

Major junctions
- South end: I-80 / S-40D south of Wood River
- US 30 in Wood River; N-2 in Cairo; N-92 south of Elba; N-70 in Ord; N-91 in Burwell; US 20 in Atkinson; N-12 in Butte
- North end: SD 43 north of Butte

Location
- Country: United States
- State: Nebraska
- Counties: Hall, Howard, Greeley, Valley, Garfield, Holt, Boyd

Highway system
- Nebraska State Highway System; Interstate; US; State; Link; Spur; State Spurs; Recreation
← N-10	→ N-12

Nebraska Highway 11 (N-11) is a state highway in central and northern Nebraska, United States. Its southern terminus is at Interstate 80 (I-80) south of Wood River. Its northern terminus is at the South Dakota border north of Butte. The highway goes through the eastern portion of the Sand Hills.

== Route description ==
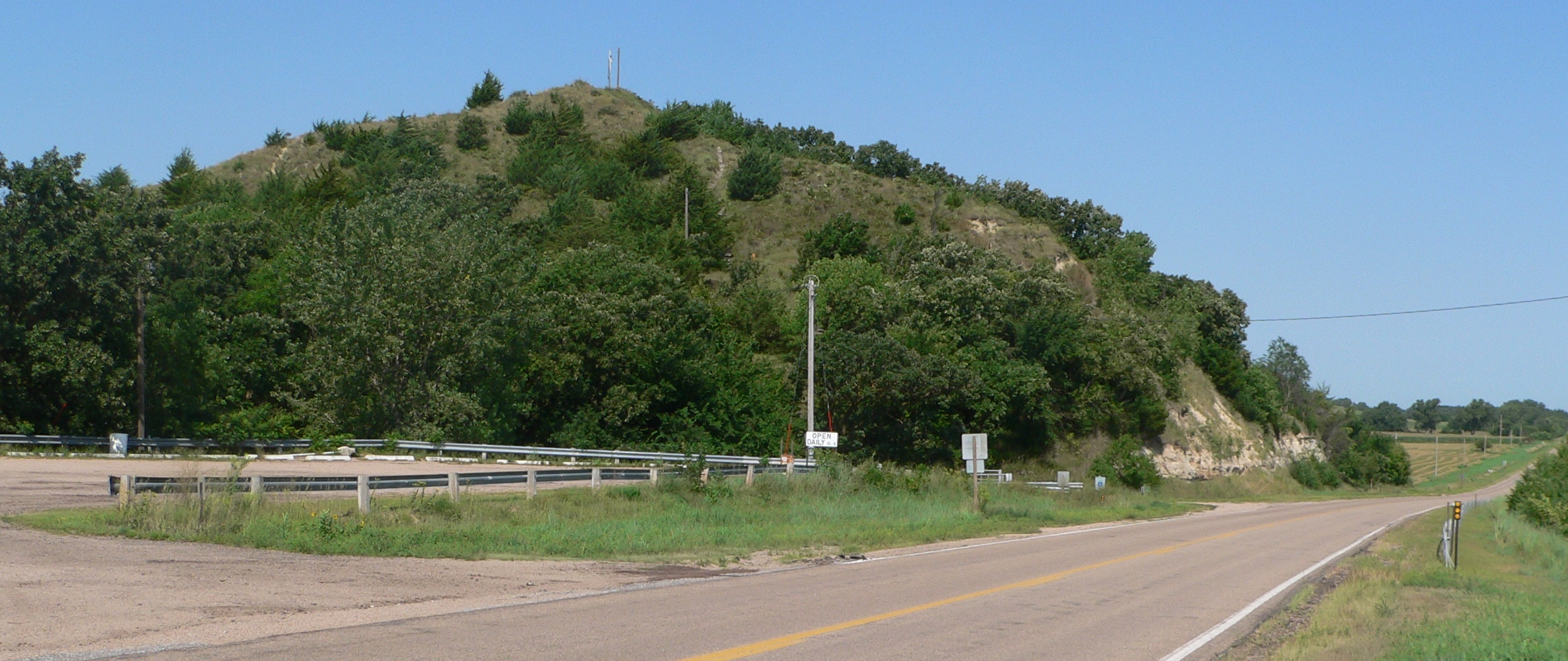
Happy Jack Peak along Nebraska Highway 11 in Greeley County, south of Scotia, August 2011

N-11 begins at Exit 300 of I-80, which is also the exit for NE Spur 40D. It goes north through farmland into Wood River, where it crosses over U.S. Route 30 in Nebraska (US 30) without an interchange. Access to US 30 is available via Link 40G 0.5 miles (0.8 km) to the north. It continues north through Cairo, then meets Nebraska Highway 58. The two highways run concurrent, heading northeast to Dannebrog, where they separate. N-11 proceeds north to Elba, then turns northwest on an alignment that parallels the North Loup River. It passes through Ord and Burwell, then turns north after passing Nebraska Highway 91. N-11 continues north into areas of prairie and meets U.S. Route 20 in Atkinson. N-11 goes north into farmland some more, briefly goes east, then turns north to go through Butte, where it meets Nebraska Highway 12 (N-12). After a brief concurrency with N-12, N-11 turns north and goes into South Dakota, where the road continues as South Dakota Highway 43.

== Major intersections ==
County	Location	mi	km	Destinations	Notes
Hall		0.00	0.00	S-40D south	Road continues south as Spur 40D
Hall		0.14	0.23	I-80	
Hall	Wood River	5.13	8.26	L-40G to US 30	Provides access to US 30
Hall	Cairo	17.51	28.18	N-2	
Howard		22.70	36.53	N-58 north (3rd Avenue)	Southern end of NE-58 concurrency
Howard	Dannebrog	27.75	44.66	N-58 south (Roger Welsch Avenue West)	Northern end of NE-58 concurrency
Howard		34.68	55.81	N-92 (3rd Avenue)	
Greeley	Scotia	54.65	87.95	N-22 east	Southern end of NE-22 concurrency
Valley	North Loup	56.68	91.22	N-22 west	Northern end of NE-22 concurrency
Valley	Ord	70.45	113.38	N-70 east (North 14th Street)	Southern end of NE-70 concurrency
Valley	Ord	71.31	114.76	N-70 west	Northern end of NE-70 concurrency
Garfield	Burwell	86.51	139.22	N-91 west	Southern end of NE-91 concurrency
Garfield	Burwell	88.50	142.43	N-91 east	Northern end of NE-91 concurrency
Holt	Amelia	120.32	193.64	N-95 east	
Holt	Atkinson	143.18	230.43	US 20 east	Southern end of US 20 concurrency
Holt	Atkinson	143.69	231.25	US 20 west (East 5th Street)	Northern end of US 20 concurrency
Boyd	Butte	176.12	283.44	N-12 west	Southern end of NE-12 concurrency
Boyd	Butte	177.12	285.05	N-12 east / Lewis and Clark Trail	Northern end of NE-12 concurrency
Boyd		183.66	295.57	SD 43 north / Lewis and Clark Trail	Continuation into South Dakota
1.000 mi = 1.609 km; 1.000 km = 0.621 mi: Concurrency terminus

== See also ==
- List of state highways in Nebraska
