= A95 =

A95 or A-95 may refer to:

- A95 road (Great Britain), a major road in the UK
- A 95 motorway (Germany)
- Canon PowerShot A95, a digital camera
- Dutch Defence, in the Encyclopaedia of Chess Openings
- MAN ND323F, a double decker bus model also known as the MAN A95
