= Nebraska Highway 95 =

State highway in Nebraska, U.S.

State Highway 95

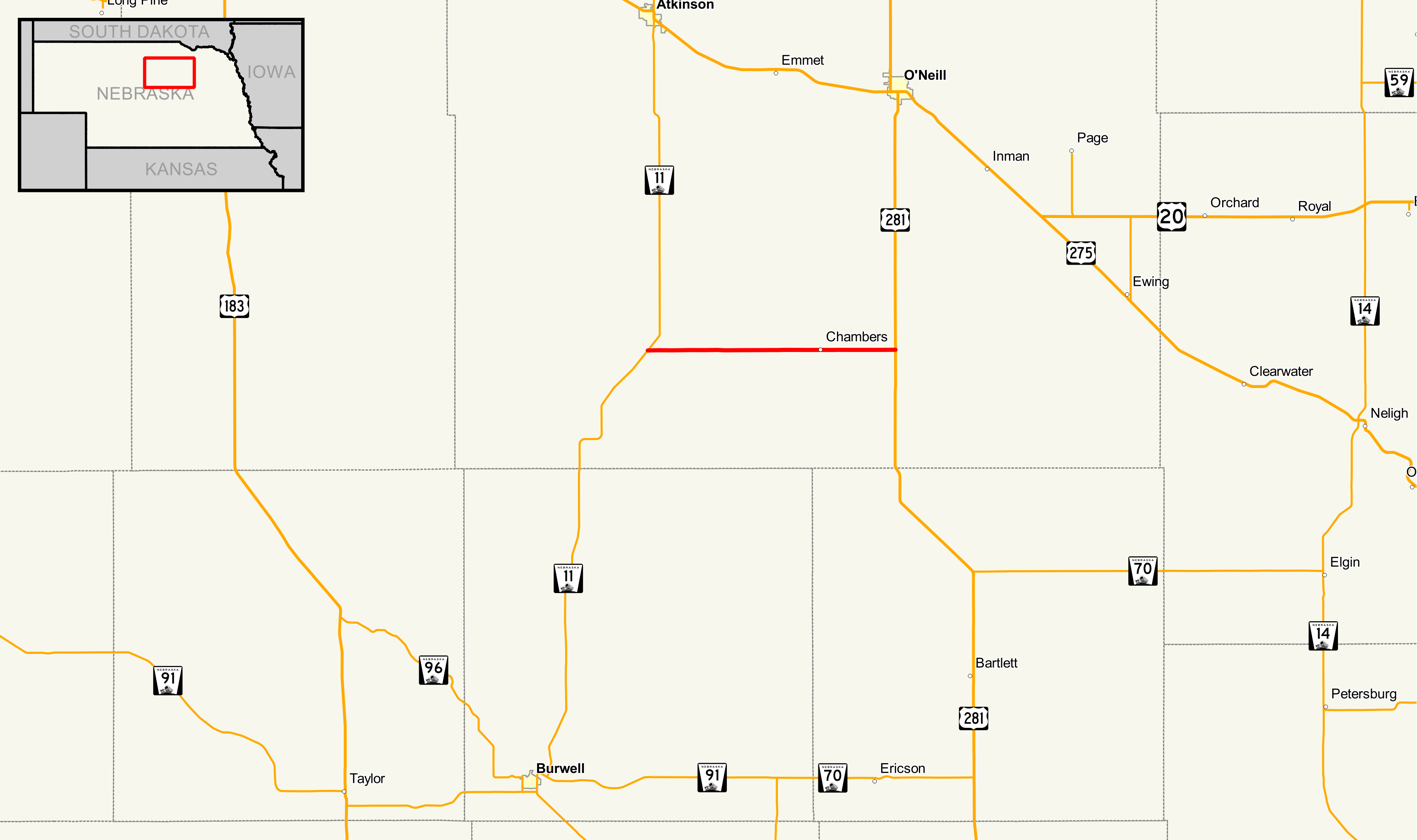
- Nebraska Highway 95 highlighted in red

Route information
- Maintained by NDOT
- Length: 16.84 mi (27.10 km)
- Existed: 1935–present

Major junctions
- West end: N-11 west of Chambers
- East end: US 281 east of Chambers

Location
- Country: United States
- State: Nebraska
- Counties: Holt

Highway system
- Nebraska State Highway System; Interstate; US; State; Link; Spur; State Spurs; Recreation
← N-94	→ N-96

Nebraska Highway 95 is a highway in northeastern Nebraska. It has a western terminus at an intersection with Nebraska Highway 11 west of Chambers. Its eastern terminus is at U.S. Highway 281 to the east of Chambers.

== Route description ==
Nebraska Highway 95 begins at an intersection with NE 11 west of Chambers. It heads in an eastward direction through farmland, passing through Chambers. It continues to the east before terminating at US 281.

== Major intersections ==
The entire route is in Holt County.

Location	mi	km	Destinations	Notes
Amelia	0.00	0.00	N-11	Western terminus
	16.84	27.10	US 281	Eastern terminus
1.000 mi = 1.609 km; 1.000 km = 0.621 mi
