= St. Charles, South Dakota =

- Census-designated place
- Location in Gregory County and the state of South Dakota
- Coordinates: 43°05′17″N 99°05′42″W
- Country: United States
- State: South Dakota
- County: Gregory

Area
  - Total: 0.20 sq mi (0.51 km^{2})
  - Land: 0.20 sq mi (0.51 km^{2})
  - Water: 0 sq mi (0.00 km^{2})
- Elevation: 2,074 ft (632 m)

Population (2020)
  - Total: 15
  - Density: 76/sq mi (29.4/km^{2})
- Time zone: UTC-6 (Central (CST))
  - Summer (DST): UTC-5 (CDT)
- Area code: 605
- FIPS code: 46-57060
- GNIS feature ID: 2393220

St. Charles or Saint Charles is a census-designated place (CDP) in Gregory County, South Dakota, United States. The population was 15 at the 2020 census.

St. Charles was laid out in 1906, and most likely was named in honor of Charlie Johnson, a first settler.

== Geography ==
According to the United States Census Bureau, the CDP has a total area of 0.2 square miles (0.52 km^{2}), all land.

== Demographics ==
Historical population
Census	Pop.	Note	%±
2020	15		—
U.S. Decennial Census

As of the census of 2000, there were 19 people, 8 households, and 5 families residing in the CDP. The population density was 97.8 inhabitants per square mile (37.8/km^{2}). There were 12 housing units at an average density of 61.8 per square mile (23.9/km^{2}). The racial makeup of the CDP was 68.42% White, 5.26% Asian, and 26.32% from two or more races.

There were 8 households, out of which 37.5% had children under the age of 18 living with them, 50.0% were married couples living together, and 37.5% were non-families. 25.0% of all households were made up of individuals, and 25.0% had someone living alone who was 65 years of age or older. The average household size was 2.38 and the average family size was 3.00.

In the CDP, the population was spread out, with 31.6% under the age of 18, 5.3% from 18 to 24, 31.6% from 25 to 44, 15.8% from 45 to 64, and 15.8% who were 65 years of age or older. The median age was 40 years. For every 100 females, there were 171.4 males. For every 100 females age 18 and over, there were 160.0 males.

The median income for a household in the CDP was $13,125, and the median income for a family was $6,250. Males had a median income of $0 versus $18,750 for females. The per capita income for the CDP was $6,033. There are 100.0% of families living below the poverty line and 75.0% of the population, including no under eighteens and 50.0% of those over 64.
