= Dallas, South Dakota =

- Town
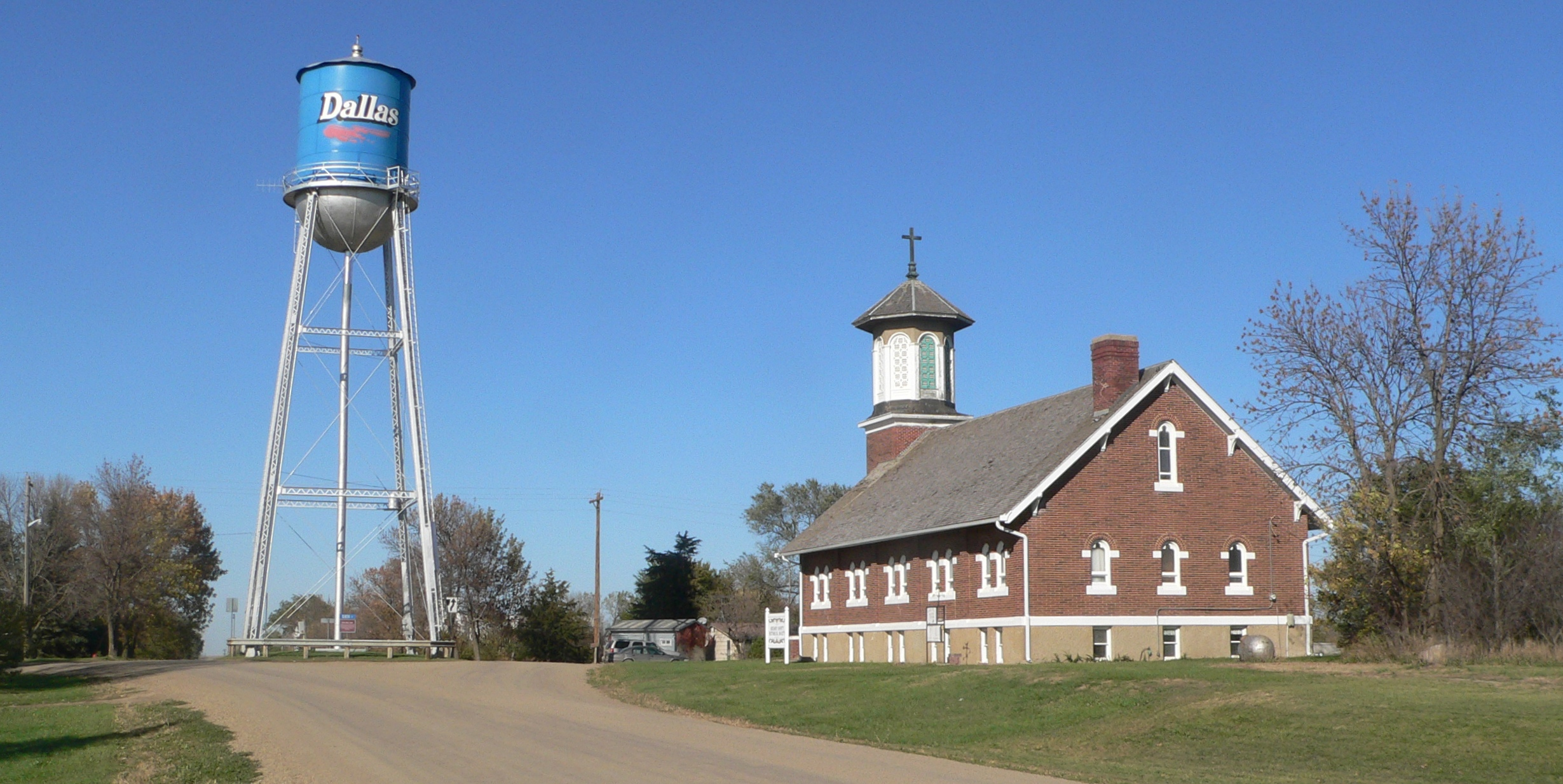
- Main Street: water tower and St. Augustine Church, October 2015

- Location in Gregory County and the state of South Dakota
- Coordinates: 43°14′16″N 99°31′03″W
- Country: United States
- State: South Dakota
- County: Gregory
- Incorporated: 1908

Area
  - Total: 0.51 sq mi (1.31 km^{2})
  - Land: 0.51 sq mi (1.31 km^{2})
  - Water: 0 sq mi (0.00 km^{2})
- Elevation: 2,225 ft (678 m)

Population (2020)
  - Total: 89
  - Density: 175.7/sq mi (67.84/km^{2})
- Time zone: UTC-6 (Central (CST))
  - Summer (DST): UTC-5 (CDT)
- ZIP code: 57529
- Area code: 605
- FIPS code: 46-15300
- GNIS feature ID: 1267346

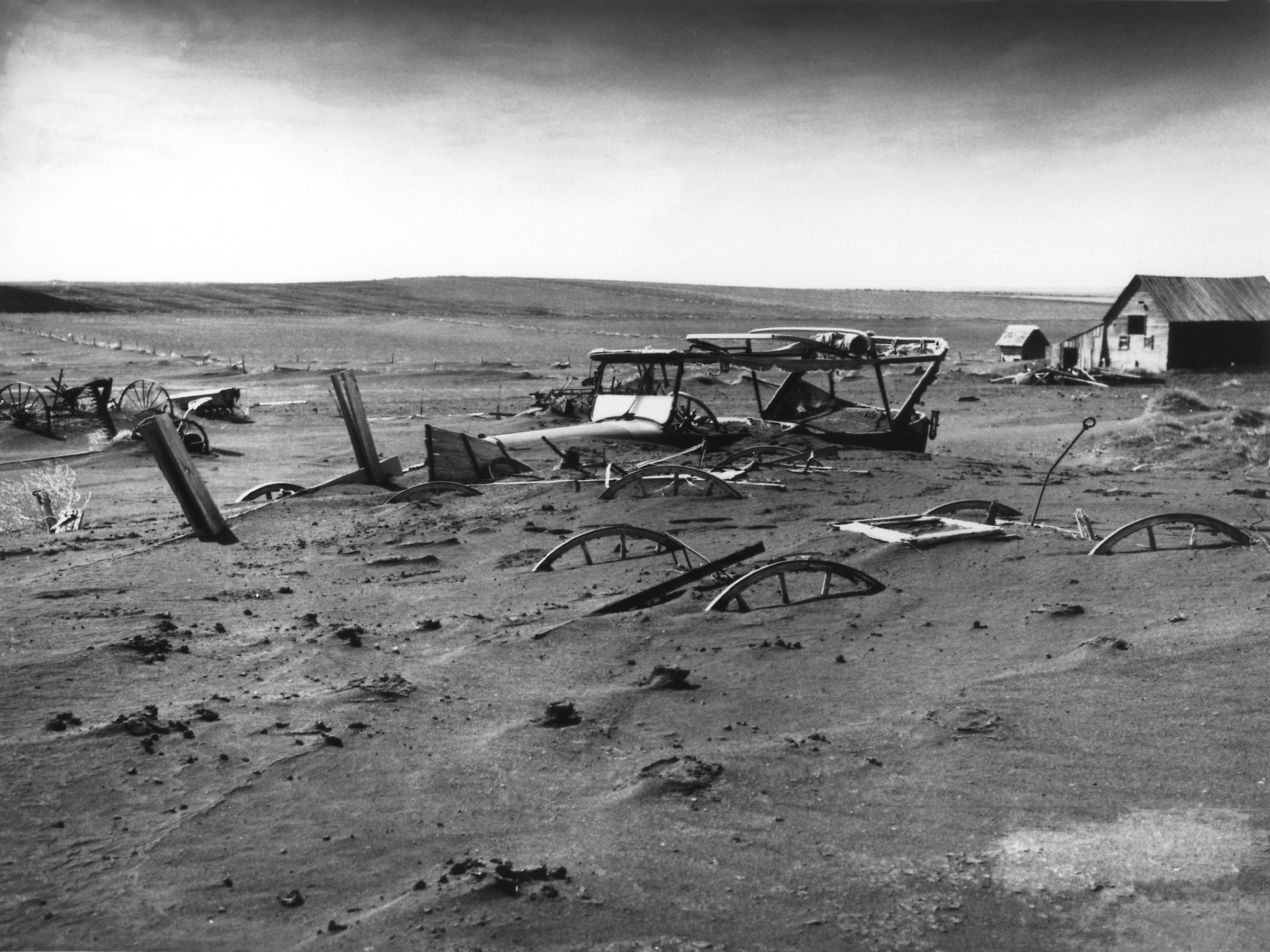
Buried machinery in barn lot, due to Dust Bowl conditions. Dallas, South Dakota, May 1936

Dallas is a town in Gregory County, South Dakota, United States. The population was 89 at the 2020 census.

== History ==
Dallas was platted in 1907. A post office called Dallas was established in 1904, and remained in operation until it was discontinued in 1973. The town was named after Dallas, Texas.

== Geography ==
Dallas is located in western Gregory County along U.S. Route 18, four miles west of Gregory. Ponca Creek flows past, approximately one mile south of the community.

According to the United States Census Bureau, the town has a total area of 0.51 square miles (1.32 km^{2}), all land.

== Demographics ==
Historical population
| Census | Pop. | Note | %± |
|---|---|---|---|
| 1910 | 1,277 | | — |
| 1920 | 705 | | −44.8% |
| 1930 | 423 | | −40.0% |
| 1940 | 278 | | −34.3% |
| 1950 | 244 | | −12.2% |
| 1960 | 212 | | −13.1% |
| 1970 | 233 | | 9.9% |
| 1980 | 199 | | −14.6% |
| 1990 | 142 | | −28.6% |
| 2000 | 144 | | 1.4% |
| 2010 | 120 | | −16.7% |
| 2020 | 89 | | −25.8% |
U.S. Decennial Census

=== 2010 census ===
As of the census of 2010, there were 120 people, 48 households, and 33 families residing in the town. The population density was 235.3 inhabitants per square mile (90.8/km^{2}). There were 74 housing units at an average density of 145.1 per square mile (56.0/km^{2}). The racial makeup of the town was 85.0% White, 7.5% Native American, 0.8% Asian, 1.7% from other races, and 5.0% from two or more races. Hispanic or Latino of any race were 5.0% of the population.

There were 48 households, of which 27.1% had children under the age of 18 living with them, 50.0% were married couples living together, 10.4% had a female householder with no husband present, 8.3% had a male householder with no wife present, and 31.3% were non-families. 27.1% of all households were made up of individuals, and 12.6% had someone living alone who was 65 years of age or older. The average household size was 2.50 and the average family size was 3.03.

The median age in the town was 46.5 years. 23.3% of residents were under the age of 18; 7.5% were between the ages of 18 and 24; 18.3% were from 25 to 44; 33.4% were from 45 to 64; and 17.5% were 65 years of age or older. The gender makeup of the town was 53.3% male and 46.7% female.

=== 2000 census ===
As of the census of 2000, there were 144 people, 59 households, and 38 families residing in the town. The population density was 286.9 inhabitants per square mile (110.8/km^{2}). There were 68 housing units at an average density of 135.5 per square mile (52.3/km^{2}). The racial makeup of the town was 90.28% White, 6.94% Native American, 0.69% from other races, and 2.08% from two or more races. Hispanic or Latino of any race were 0.69% of the population.

There were 59 households, out of which 28.8% had children under the age of 18 living with them, 52.5% were married couples living together, 6.8% had a female householder with no husband present, and 33.9% were non-families. 25.4% of all households were made up of individuals, and 16.9% had someone living alone who was 65 years of age or older. The average household size was 2.44 and the average family size was 2.95.

In the town, the population was spread out, with 24.3% under the age of 18, 5.6% from 18 to 24, 26.4% from 25 to 44, 22.9% from 45 to 64, and 20.8% who were 65 years of age or older. The median age was 42 years. For every 100 females, there were 114.9 males. For every 100 females age 18 and over, there were 98.2 males.

The median income for a household in the town was $17,917, and the median income for a family was $18,906. Males had a median income of $17,813 versus $18,438 for females. The per capita income for the town was $11,970. There were 23.1% of families and 28.3% of the population living below the poverty line, including 31.0% of under eighteens and 32.3% of those over 64.

== Notable person ==
- Oscar Micheaux (1884–1951), film director and author

== See also ==
- List of towns in South Dakota
