= Mayfield Township, Hall County, Nebraska =

Was the subject of a Gary Larson cartoon "place where the sun don't shine"

Coordinates: 41.004°N 98.550°W

Mayfield Township is a township in Hall County, Nebraska, in the United States.

== History ==
It was organized in 1881.
