= South Loup Township, Hall County, Nebraska =

Coordinates: 41.003°N 98.665°W

South Loup Township is a township in Hall County, Nebraska, in the United States.

== History ==
It was organized in 1881.
