= Chambers, Nebraska =

- Village
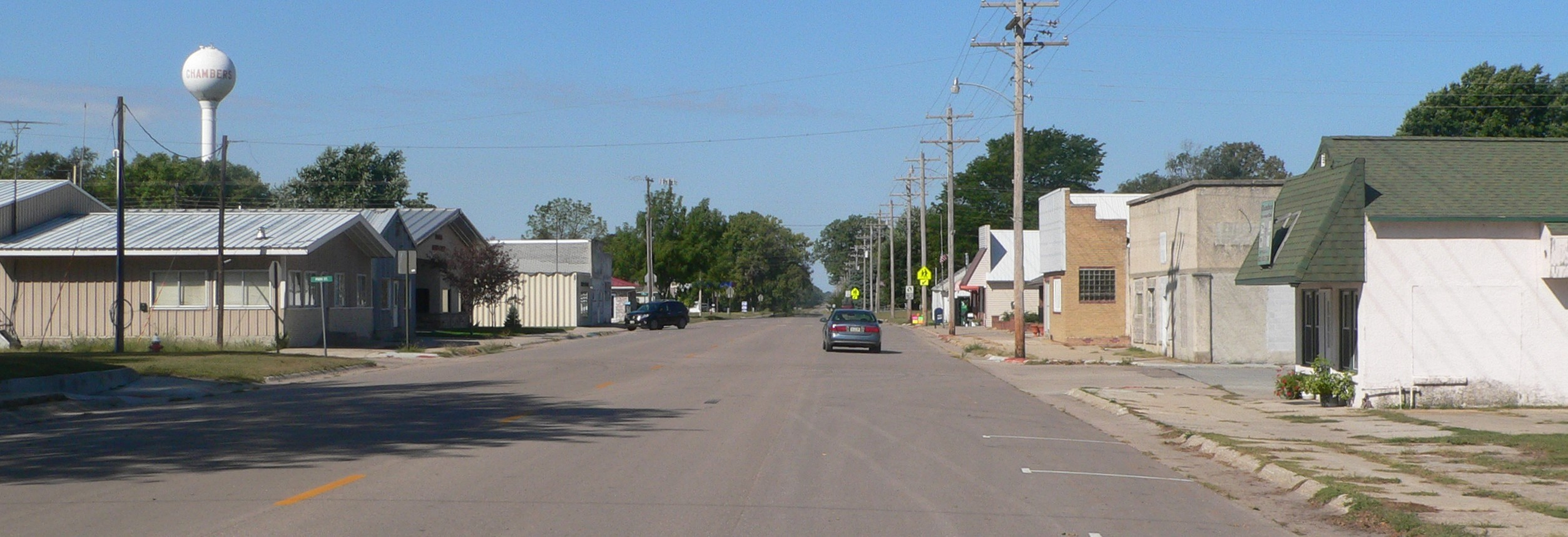
- Nebraska Highway 95 in Chambers

- Location of Chambers, Nebraska
- Coordinates: 42°12′17″N 98°44′55″W
- Country: United States
- State: Nebraska
- County: Holt

Area
  - Total: 1.02 sq mi (2.64 km^{2})
  - Land: 1.02 sq mi (2.64 km^{2})
  - Water: 0 sq mi (0.00 km^{2})
- Elevation: 2,123 ft (647 m)

Population (2020)
  - Total: 288
  - Density: 283.0/sq mi (109.28/km^{2})
- Time zone: UTC-6 (Central (CST))
  - Summer (DST): UTC-5 (CDT)
- ZIP code: 68725
- Area code: 402
- FIPS code: 31-08675
- GNIS feature ID: 2397598
- Website: www.villageofchambers.org

Chambers is a village in Holt County, Nebraska, United States. As of the 2020 census, Chambers had a population of 288.

== History ==
Chambers was founded in 1884 as a point on the mail route. It was named for B. F. Chambers, an agent at the United States General Land Office.

== Geography ==
According to the United States Census Bureau, the village has a total area of 1.02 square miles (2.64 km^{2}), all land.

== Demographics ==
Historical population
Census	Pop.	Note	%±
1920	256		—
1930	259		1.2%
1940	388		49.8%
1950	395		1.8%
1960	396		0.3%
1970	321		−18.9%
1980	390		21.5%
1990	341		−12.6%
2000	333		−2.3%
2010	268		−19.5%
2020	288		7.5%
U.S. Decennial Census

=== 2010 census ===
As of the census of 2010, there were 268 people, 135 households, and 80 families living in the village. The population density was 262.7 inhabitants per square mile (101.4/km^{2}). There were 166 housing units at an average density of 162.7 per square mile (62.8/km^{2}). The racial makeup of the village was 100.0% White. Hispanic or Latino of any race were 0.7% of the population.

There were 135 households, of which 20.0% had children under the age of 18 living with them, 53.3% were married couples living together, 5.2% had a female householder with no husband present, 0.7% had a male householder with no wife present, and 40.7% were non-families. 39.3% of all households were made up of individuals, and 16.3% had someone living alone who was 65 years of age or older. The average household size was 1.99 and the average family size was 2.64.

The median age in the village was 54 years. 18.3% of residents were under the age of 18; 3.1% were between the ages of 18 and 24; 17.3% were from 25 to 44; 31.4% were from 45 to 64; and 30.2% were 65 years of age or older. The gender makeup of the village was 48.9% male and 51.1% female.

=== 2000 census ===
As of the census of 2000, there were 333 people, 153 households, and 102 families living in the village. The population density was 331.6 inhabitants per square mile (128.0/km^{2}). There were 172 housing units at an average density of 171.3 per square mile (66.1/km^{2}). The racial makeup of the village was 99.70% White, 0.30% from other races. Hispanic or Latino of any race were 0.60% of the population.

There were 153 households, out of which 22.9% had children under the age of 18 living with them, 59.5% were married couples living together, 5.2% had a female householder with no husband present, and 33.3% were non-families. 32.7% of all households were made up of individuals, and 15.7% had someone living alone who was 65 years of age or older. The average household size was 2.18 and the average family size was 2.75.

In the village, the population was spread out, with 21.0% under the age of 18, 5.4% from 18 to 24, 20.4% from 25 to 44, 29.4% from 45 to 64, and 23.7% who were 65 years of age or older. The median age was 47 years. For every 100 females, there were 85.0 males. For every 100 females age 18 and over, there were 87.9 males.

As of 2000 the median income for a household in the village was $24,750, and the median income for a family was $28,611. Males had a median income of $23,750 versus $17,778 for females. The per capita income for the village was $14,941. About 4.8% of families and 7.6% of the population were below the poverty line, including 9.1% of those under age 18 and 11.9% of those age 65 or over.

== Points of interest ==
Chambers annually hosts the Holt County Fair in August.
