= Grand Island and Wyoming Central Railroad =

Nebraska and South Dakota railroad

The Grand Island and Wyoming Central Railroad (GI&WC) was a railroad that served the U.S. states of Nebraska and South Dakota. It was headquartered in Grand Island, Nebraska. In 1902, it had a length of 401.32 miles (645.86 km).

It was leased by the Burlington and Missouri River Railroad (B&M), which was a subsidiary of the Chicago, Burlington and Quincy Railroad, on May 25, 1886. The original intent was to extend the line into Wyoming, and westward construction began in 1886; but in 1889, the railroad began building into the Black Hills to serve the mines built during the Black Hills Gold Rush. In 1890, the railroad reached Hill City and Englewood, and in 1891, service to Deadwood was established. A line to Spearfish was added in 1893. In 1897, the B&M purchased the GI&WC, and the line began operating as the B&M.
