= Mary Daniel Turner =

American Catholic nun (1925–2010)

Sister Mary Daniel Turner SNDdeN

Personal life
- Born: November 21, 1925 Baltimore, Maryland, U.S.
- Died: January 27, 2010 (aged 84) Burtonsville, Maryland, U.S.

Religious life
- Religion: Catholic Church
- Order: Sisters of Notre Dame de Namur

Mary Daniel Turner SNDdeN (November 21, 1925 – January 27, 2010) was an American Catholic sister of Notre Dame de Namur and the former executive director of the Leadership Conference of Women Religious (LCWR). She is notable for her co-authored book, The Transformation of American Catholic Sisters, that helped define progressive sisters' response to Vatican II and placed her near the forefront of the Vatican's three-year investigation of American Catholic sisters, begun under Pope Benedict XVI and ended under Pope Francis.

== Early life and education ==
She was born Margaret Turner in 1925 in Baltimore, Maryland. Her mother was a government worker and her father was a butcher. The family moved to Washington, DC, when she was a small child. She was educated at Catholic schools, and graduated from the Academy of Notre Dame in Washington, DC (now closed), operated by the Sisters of Notre Dame de Namur (SNDdeN). In 1943 she entered the SNDdeN after graduating high school. She took her final vows in 1951 when she was 26 years old. She then earned a BA in philosophy from Trinity College (now Trinity Washington University) (1959), and an MA in philosophy from Catholic University of America (1962). She earned a second MA in theology from the University of St. Michael's College, part of the University of Toronto, Canada, in 1972.

This investigation is not simply about the way sisters are living. It has to do with issues that are far wider. A wider number of laity are asking the same questions we are. Deep down, the central question is 'who are we, as Catholics, in a pluralistic society.' – Mary Daniel Turner, SNDdeN, in National Catholic Reporter, from an August 2009 interview, published January 28, 2010

== Work as a teacher and religious leader ==
In the 1950s she began her professional life as an elementary school teacher, eventually becoming principal of St. James School in Mount Rainier, Maryland, part of St. James Catholic Church. She was the director for newly professed nuns who were also studying in college. In 1962 she was made Maryland provincial superior of her congregation at age 38, serving in that role for seven years until 1969. From 1963 to 1968 she was chair of the Sisters Formation Conference, which by her own assessment became "the single most critical ground for the radical transformative process following Vatican II." In 1972 at age 48 she was elected executive director of the newly renamed Leadership Conference of Women Religious (LCWR), serving until 1978. In November 1975 she addressed the first International Women's Ordination Conference in Detroit, Michigan. In 1978 at age 53 she was named superior general of her global congregation, overseeing provinces in the Americas, Africa, Europe, and Asia. She also worked as a lecturer in the departments of theology and philosophy at Trinity Washington University. Trinity gave her an honorary doctorate in 1984, with the citation that because "in her unflinching search for truth she has empowered women to believe in the possibility of a transformed world that is inclusive, collaborative and pluralistic." She gave the commencement speeches in 1981 and 1989 at Washington Theological Union.

She was involved in the establishment of key national organizations, including the United States Catholic Mission Conference, (1949, it later became the USCMA); the Religious Formation Conference (1954, serving both women's and men's congregations); the Association of Contemplative Sisters (1969); Sisters Uniting (1969); NETWORK (1971, Catholic sisters' social justice lobby); and the Center for the Study of Religious Life (1998, academic research center based at the Washington Theological Union).

== Books and publications ==
In a 1985 chapter titled "Woman and Power," Turner called out the Catholic church for being overly dependent on Thomas Aquinas and the outdated "erroneous biological presuppositions" of 13th-century medical thought on which he based his views of women. She also critiqued herself as having "a patriarchal ethos and ethic inform my understanding, perceptions, and attitudes toward myself as well as toward other women.... We have been socialized to be 'at home' with patriarchy." "We must, then, liberate ourselves and our systems from a patriarchal world-view."

In 1993, with Lora Ann Quiñonez CDP, also a former LCWR director, she co-authored a book, The Transformation of American Catholic Sisters (Temple University Press, 1993). It was based in part on an article they published that same year. In 2009 James Martin SJ summarized its lasting influence:

The chasm between traditional and progressive religious life was made evident in 1992 with the publication of The Transformation of the American Catholic Sisterhood by Lora Ann Quiñonez, C.D.P., and Mary Daniel Turner, S.N.D.deN. The book impelled Cardinal James Hickey, bishop of Washington, D.C., at the time, to travel to Rome to fight for the establishment of a congregation of women religious that would be more faithful to the church. Hence the Conference of Major Superiors of Women Religious was formed with membership based on wearing the habit, communal prayer, eucharistic adoration and fidelity to the church. Meanwhile, the Leadership Conference of Women Religious continued in the spirit of Vatican II to be open to the world, exploring avenues of liberation theology, feminist theology and the plight of the poor, among others.

— James Martin SJ, America and Commonweal on the Apostolic Visitation", America: The Jesuit Review, October 5, 2009

The contrast between the progressive and conservative Catholic sisters' conferences became evident in 2012, when under Pope Benedict XIV the Vatican launched what became a three-year investigation into American Catholic sisters, with a specific focus on the LCWR. Turner's own assessment was that it was more than just priests versus sisters. She wrote:

I think the issues are wider than women religious. The issues have to do with the whole church. I hate to see this reduced to religious life. It's deeper than that. It's really a difference in values between the church of Rome and the U.S. church.

— Mary Daniel Turner SNDdeN, National Catholic Reporter, from an August 2009 interview, published January 28, 2010

She appeared in a video that the Smithsonian showed in early 2010 as part of the traveling exhibit "Women and Spirit: Catholic Sisters in America."

== Last service and retirement ==
Turner retired in 1994. For the remainder of the 1990s she co-directed Joseph's House in Washington, DC, that served and housed men experiencing homelessness and chronic illness. She died at the Sanctuary at Holy Cross care center in Burtonsville, Maryland, and is buried at the Sisters of Notre Dame de Namur Cemetery in Ilchester, Maryland.

Each year the Religious Formation Conference gives the Mary Daniel Turner, SNDdeN, Scholarship in her honor.
