= Fairfax, South Dakota =

- Town
- Location in Gregory County and the state of South Dakota
- Coordinates: 43°01′41″N 98°53′20″W
- Country: United States
- State: South Dakota
- County: Gregory
- Settled: 1890

Area
  - Total: 0.30 sq mi (0.78 km^{2})
  - Land: 0.30 sq mi (0.78 km^{2})
  - Water: 0 sq mi (0.00 km^{2})
- Elevation: 1,949 ft (594 m)

Population (2020)
  - Total: 96
  - Density: 317.2/sq mi (122.48/km^{2})
- Time zone: UTC-6 (Central (CST))
  - Summer (DST): UTC-5 (CDT)
- ZIP code: 57335
- Area code: 605
- FIPS code: 46-20380
- GNIS feature ID: 1267386

Fairfax is a town in southeastern Gregory County, South Dakota, United States. The population was 96 at the 2020 census.

== History ==
The first settlement at Fairfax was made around 1890. A post office called Fairfax has been in operation since 1892. It was named after Fairfax, Virginia, the former hometown of an early settler.

== Geography ==
According to the United States Census Bureau, the town has a total area of 0.30 square miles (0.78 km^{2}), all land.

== Demographics ==
Historical population
Census	Pop.	Note	%±
1910	500		—
1920	530		6.0%
1930	430		−18.9%
1940	338		−21.4%
1950	301		−10.9%
1960	253		−15.9%
1970	199		−21.3%
1980	225		13.1%
1990	144		−36.0%
2000	123		−14.6%
2010	115		−6.5%
2020	96		−16.5%
U.S. Decennial Census

=== 2010 census ===
At the 2010 census, there were 115 people, 63 households and 33 families residing in the town. The population density was 383.3 inhabitants per square mile (148.0/km^{2}). There were 81 housing units at an average density of 270.0 per square mile (104.2/km^{2}). The racial makeup of the town was 97.4% White, 1.7% African American, and 0.9% Native American.

There were 63 households, of which 17.5% had children under the age of 18 living with them, 41.3% were married couples living together, 11.1% had a female householder with no husband present, and 47.6% were non-families. 44.4% of all households were made up of individuals, and 22.2% had someone living alone who was 65 years of age or older. The average household size was 1.83 and the average family size was 2.52.

The median age was 52.5 years. 15.7% of residents were under the age of 18; 3.3% were between the ages of 18 and 24; 14.7% were from 25 to 44; 37.3% were from 45 to 64; and 28.7% were 65 years of age or older. The sex make-up of the town was 46.1% male and 53.9% female.

=== 2000 census ===
At the 2000 census, there were 123 people, 63 households and 33 families residing in the town. The population density was 414.4 inhabitants per square mile (160.0/km^{2}). There were 76 housing units at an average density of 256.1 per square mile (98.9/km^{2}). The racial makeup of the town was 96.75% White and 3.25% Native American.

There were 63 households, of which 17.5% had children under the age of 18 living with them, 44.4% were married couples living together, 6.3% had a female householder with no husband present, and 47.6% were non-families. 47.6% of all households were made up of individuals, and 31.7% had someone living alone who was 65 years of age or older. The average household size was 1.95 and the average family size was 2.82.

17.9% of the population were under the age of 18, 3.3% from 18 to 24, 17.9% from 25 to 44, 25.2% from 45 to 64, and 35.8% who were 65 years of age or older. The median age was 52 years. For every 100 females, there were 83.6 males. For every 100 females age 18 and over, there were 80.4 males.

The median household income was $19,844 and the median family income was $36,000. Males had a median income of $21,250 and females $21,250. The per capita income was $12,805. There were no families and 4.8% of the population living below the poverty line, including no under eighteens and 10.3% of those over 64.

== See also ==
- List of towns in South Dakota
