= Gregory County, South Dakota =

County in South Dakota, United States

- County
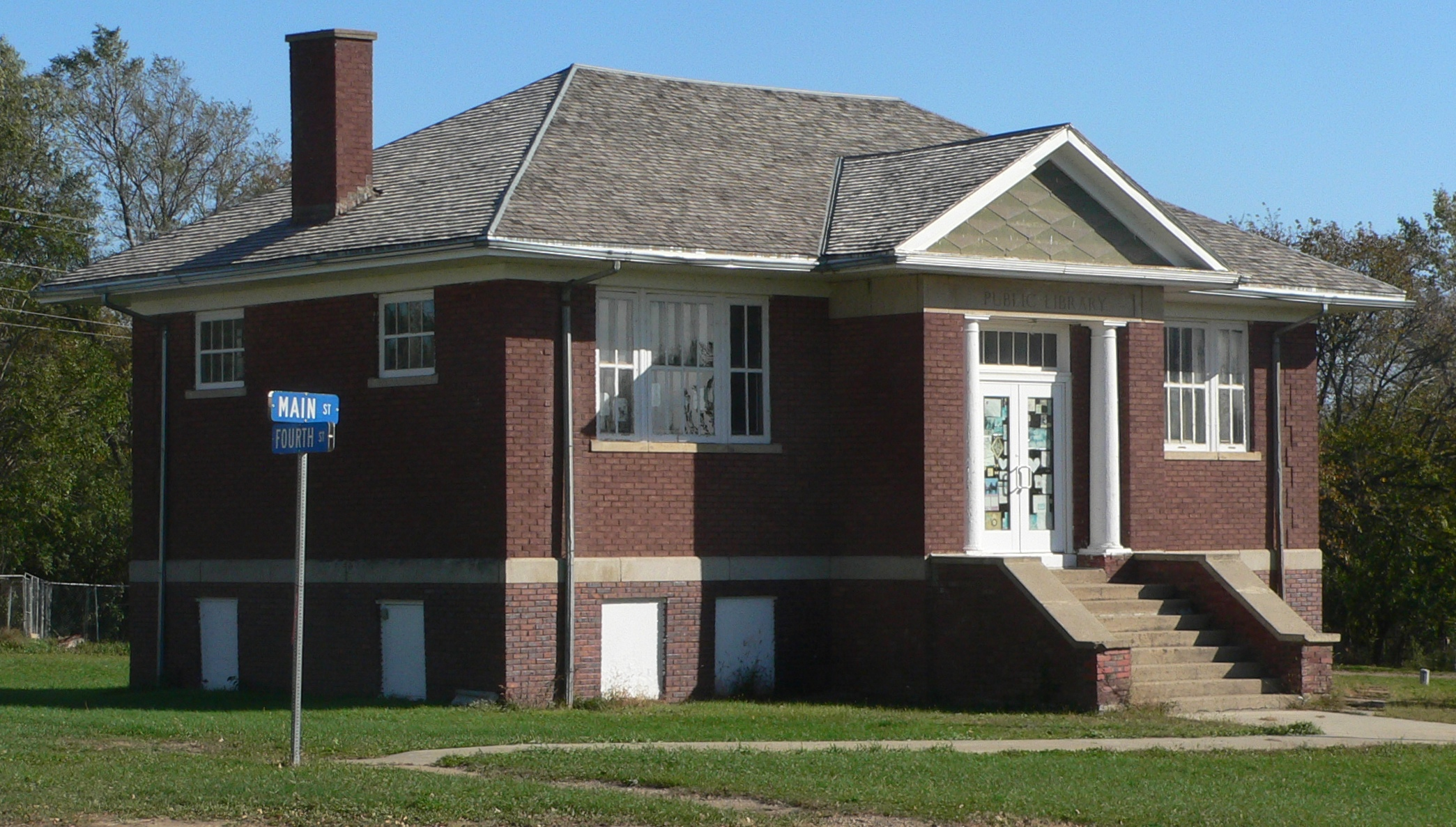
- Carnegie Library in Dallas, South Dakota

- Location within the U.S. state of South Dakota
- Coordinates: 43°12′N 99°11′W
- Country: United States
- State: South Dakota
- Created: 1862
- Organized: 1898
- Named for: J. Shaw Gregory
- Seat: Burke
- Largest city: Gregory

Area
  - Total: 1,054 sq mi (2,730 km^{2})
  - Land: 1,015 sq mi (2,630 km^{2})
  - Water: 39 sq mi (100 km^{2}) 3.7%

Population (2020)
  - Total: 3,994
  - Estimate (2025): 4,037 ▲
  - Density: 3.935/sq mi (1.519/km^{2})
- Time zone: UTC−6 (Central)
  - Summer (DST): UTC−5 (CDT)
- Congressional district: At-large
- Website: www.gregory.sdcounty.gov

Gregory County is a county in the U.S. state of South Dakota. As of the 2020 census, the population was 3,994. Its county seat is Burke. The county was created in 1862 and organized in 1898. It was named for the politician J. Shaw Gregory.

== Geography ==
Gregory County lies on the south line of South Dakota. Its south boundary line abuts the north boundary line of Nebraska. The Missouri River flows southeastward along its east boundary line. The county terrain consists of rolling hills, sloping to the southeast. The eastern part of the county is etched with gullies and drainages, flowing to the river basin. The county's highest point is in the SW corner, at 2,247 ft (685 m) ASL.

Gregory County has a total area of 1,054 square miles (2,730 km^{2}), of which 1,015 square miles (2,630 km^{2}) is land and 39 square miles (100 km^{2}) (3.7%) is water.

=== Major highways ===
- U.S. Highway 18
- U.S. Highway 281
- South Dakota Highway 43
- South Dakota Highway 44
- South Dakota Highway 47
- South Dakota Highway 251
- South Dakota Highway 1806

=== Adjacent counties ===
- Lyman County – north
- Charles Mix County – east
- Boyd County, Nebraska – south
- Keya Paha County, Nebraska – southwest
- Tripp County – west

=== Protected areas ===
- Burke Lake State Recreation Area
- Buryanek State Game Production Area
- Buryanek State Recreation Area
- Central Gregory State Game Production Area
- Dixon Dam State Game Production Area
- Herrick Lake State Game Production Area
- Karl E. Mundt National Wildlife Refuge (part)
- Landing Creek State Game Production Area
- Missouri National Recreational River (part)
- Randall Creek State Recreation Area
- Scalp Creek State Game Production Area
- Southern Gregory State Game Production Area
- South Scalp Creek State Lakeside Use Area
- South Shore State Lakeside Use Area
- South Wheeler State Lakeside Area
- Whetstone Bay State Lakeside Use Area
- Whetstone State Game Production Area

=== Lakes ===
- Burke Lake
- Indian Lake
- Lake Berry
- Lake Burch
- Lake Francis Case (part)

== Demographics ==
Historical population
Census	Pop.	Note	%±
1890	295		—
1900	2,211		649.5%
1910	13,061		490.7%
1920	12,700		−2.8%
1930	11,420		−10.1%
1940	9,554		−16.3%
1950	8,556		−10.4%
1960	7,399		−13.5%
1970	6,710		−9.3%
1980	6,015		−10.4%
1990	5,359		−10.9%
2000	4,792		−10.6%
2010	4,271		−10.9%
2020	3,994		−6.5%
2025 (est.)	4,037	▲	1.1%
U.S. Decennial Census; 1790–1960 1900–1990; 1990–2000 2010–2020

=== 2020 census ===
As of the 2020 census, there were 3,994 people, 1,721 households, and 1,070 families residing in the county. The population density was 3.9 inhabitants per square mile (1.5/km^{2}). There were 2,186 housing units.

Of the residents, 22.5% were under the age of 18 and 27.7% were 65 years of age or older; the median age was 48.0 years. For every 100 females there were 98.7 males, and for every 100 females age 18 and over there were 97.8 males.

The racial makeup of the county was 87.7% White, 0.2% Black or African American, 6.7% American Indian and Alaska Native, 0.6% Asian, 0.4% from some other race, and 4.3% from two or more races. Hispanic or Latino residents of any race comprised 1.3% of the population.

There were 1,721 households in the county, of which 25.4% had children under the age of 18 living with them and 24.8% had a female householder with no spouse or partner present. About 34.4% of all households were made up of individuals and 18.1% had someone living alone who was 65 years of age or older.

Of the 2,186 housing units, 21.3% were vacant. Among occupied housing units, 76.1% were owner-occupied and 23.9% were renter-occupied. The homeowner vacancy rate was 2.4% and the rental vacancy rate was 12.9%.

=== 2010 census ===
As of the 2010 census, there were 4,271 people, 1,936 households, and 1,172 families in the county. The population density was 4.2 inhabitants per square mile (1.6/km^{2}). There were 2,503 housing units at an average density of 2.5 units per square mile (0.97 units/km^{2}). The racial makeup of the county was 89.6% white, 7.5% American Indian, 0.3% Asian, 0.2% black or African American, 0.2% from other races, and 2.2% from two or more races. Those of Hispanic or Latino origin made up 0.9% of the population. In terms of ancestry, 54.5% were German, 11.4% were Irish, 10.9% were Czech, 7.1% were English, 6.0% were Norwegian, and 2.4% were American.

Of the 1,936 households, 23.7% had children under the age of 18 living with them, 49.9% were married couples living together, 7.4% had a female householder with no husband present, 39.5% were non-families, and 36.6% of all households were made up of individuals. The average household size was 2.18 and the average family size was 2.84. The median age was 48.2 years.

The median income for a household in the county was $33,940 and the median income for a family was $44,333. Males had a median income of $30,401 versus $25,804 for females. The per capita income for the county was $21,311. About 10.7% of families and 16.0% of the population were below the poverty line, including 27.1% of those under age 18 and 19.2% of those age 65 or over.

== Communities ==
=== Cities ===
- Bonesteel
- Burke (County Seat)
- Gregory

=== Towns ===
- Dallas
- Fairfax
- Herrick

=== Census-designated place ===
- St. Charles

=== Unincorporated communities ===
- Carlock
- Dixon
- Lucas

=== Townships ===
- Burke
- Carlock
- Dickens
- Dixon
- Edens
- Ellston
- Fairfax
- Jones
- Landing Creek
- Pleasant Valley
- Star Valley
- Whetstone

=== Unorganized territories ===
- East Gregory
- North Gregory
- Southeast Gregory
- Spring Valley

== Economy ==
Farming and ranching are two main economic factors of the county.

== Politics ==
Like all of South Dakota outside Native American counties, Gregory County is powerfully Republican. No Democrat has carried Gregory County since Jimmy Carter in 1976. Like almost all of rural America, recent swings away from the Democratic Party have been very rapid: Donald Trump's 79.0 percent of the county's vote is the largest any candidate has obtained in the county since South Dakota statehood.

United States presidential election results for Gregory County, South Dakota
Year	Republican		Democratic		Third party(ies)	
Year	No.	%	No.	%	No.	%
1896	110	48.67%	116	51.33%	0	0.00%
1900	323	55.03%	259	44.12%	5	0.85%
1904	675	67.10%	282	28.03%	49	4.87%
1908	1,550	52.83%	1,266	43.15%	118	4.02%
1912	0	0.00%	1,176	44.46%	1,469	55.54%
1916	1,434	51.86%	1,242	44.92%	89	3.22%
1920	1,833	57.61%	744	23.38%	605	19.01%
1924	1,643	44.61%	818	22.21%	1,222	33.18%
1928	2,274	53.04%	2,001	46.68%	12	0.28%
1932	1,169	26.14%	3,278	73.30%	25	0.56%
1936	1,868	41.10%	2,603	57.27%	74	1.63%
1940	2,478	54.91%	2,035	45.09%	0	0.00%
1944	2,067	56.17%	1,613	43.83%	0	0.00%
1948	1,723	48.37%	1,793	50.34%	46	1.29%
1952	2,463	64.22%	1,372	35.78%	0	0.00%
1956	1,945	52.01%	1,795	47.99%	0	0.00%
1960	2,063	53.71%	1,778	46.29%	0	0.00%
1964	1,644	45.18%	1,995	54.82%	0	0.00%
1968	1,810	54.40%	1,266	38.05%	251	7.54%
1972	1,670	51.59%	1,555	48.04%	12	0.37%
1976	1,475	46.90%	1,658	52.72%	12	0.38%
1980	2,283	68.35%	883	26.44%	174	5.21%
1984	1,777	69.17%	780	30.36%	12	0.47%
1988	1,566	57.53%	1,138	41.81%	18	0.66%
1992	1,027	39.27%	879	33.61%	709	27.11%
1996	1,208	49.65%	923	37.94%	302	12.41%
2000	1,487	65.88%	718	31.81%	52	2.30%
2004	1,685	66.18%	813	31.93%	48	1.89%
2008	1,423	63.33%	771	34.31%	53	2.36%
2012	1,507	70.06%	599	27.85%	45	2.09%
2016	1,600	76.52%	391	18.70%	100	4.78%
2020	1,771	78.43%	455	20.15%	32	1.42%
2024	1,790	78.96%	426	18.79%	51	2.25%

== National Register of Historic Places sites ==
- National Register of Historic Places listings in Gregory County, South Dakota
- Fort Randall
