= Rockville, Nebraska =

Village in Sherman County, Nebraska, United States

- Village
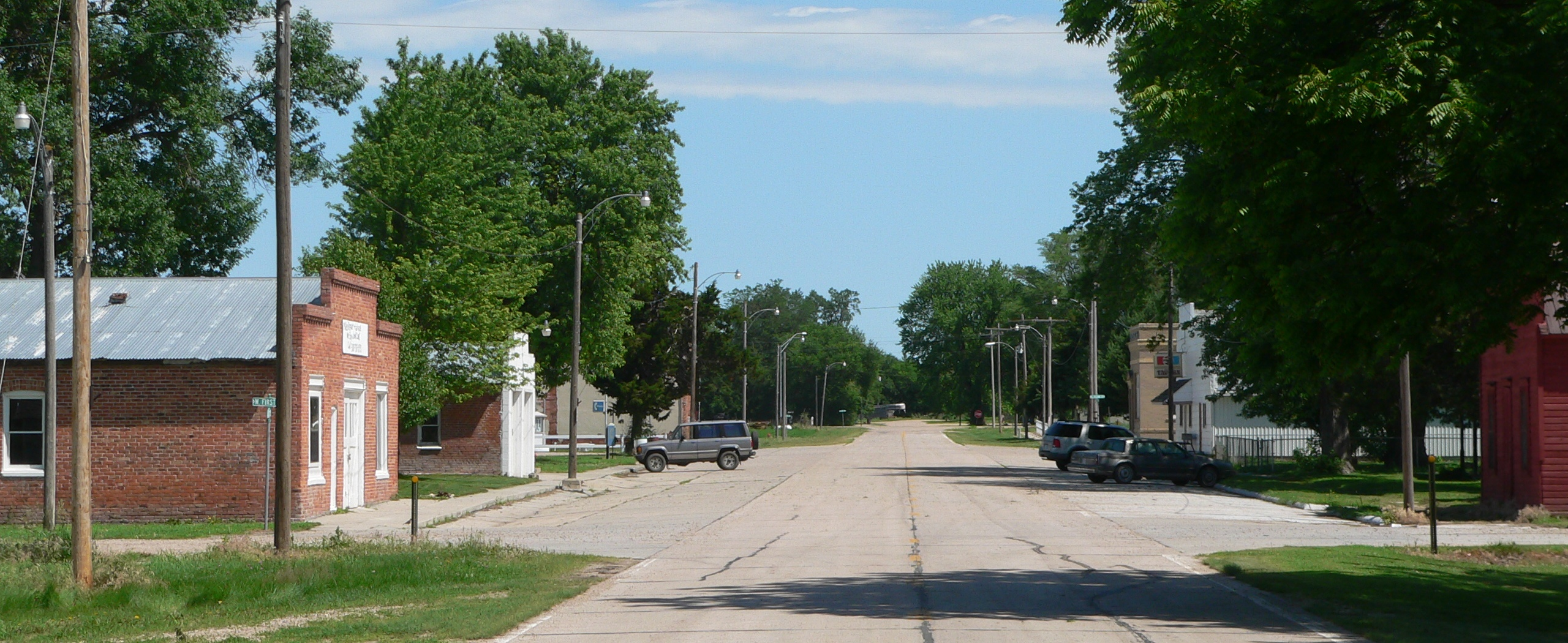
- Downtown Rockville: Ley Street, looking northward, June 2010

- Location of Rockville, Nebraska
- Coordinates: 41°07′07″N 98°49′52″W
- Country: United States
- State: Nebraska
- County: Sherman

Area
  - Total: 0.22 sq mi (0.58 km^{2})
  - Land: 0.22 sq mi (0.58 km^{2})
  - Water: 0 sq mi (0.00 km^{2})
- Elevation: 1,978 ft (603 m)

Population (2020)
  - Total: 89
  - Density: 400.1/sq mi (154.47/km^{2})
- Time zone: UTC-6 (Central (CST))
  - Summer (DST): UTC-5 (CDT)
- ZIP code: 68871
- Area code: 308
- FIPS code: 31-42075
- GNIS feature ID: 2399107

Rockville is a village in Sherman County, Nebraska, United States. As of the 2020 census, Rockville had a population of 89.

== History ==
Rockville was platted in 1886 when the Union Pacific Railroad was extended to that point. It was named from Rock Creek.

== Geography ==
According to the United States Census Bureau, the village has a total area of 0.22 square miles (0.57 km^{2}), all land.

== Demographics ==
Historical population
Census	Pop.	Note	%±
1900	158		—
1910	201		27.2%
1920	208		3.5%
1930	241		15.9%
1940	233		−3.3%
1950	164		−29.6%
1960	153		−6.7%
1970	114		−25.5%
1980	116		1.8%
1990	87		−25.0%
2000	111		27.6%
2010	106		−4.5%
2020	89		−16.0%
U.S. Decennial Census

=== 2010 census ===
As of the census of 2010, there were 106 people, 52 households, and 30 families residing in the village. The population density was 481.8 inhabitants per square mile (186.0/km^{2}). There were 60 housing units at an average density of 272.7 per square mile (105.3/km^{2}). The racial makeup of the village was 99.1% White and 0.9% Asian.

There were 52 households, of which 26.9% had children under the age of 18 living with them, 48.1% were married couples living together, 1.9% had a female householder with no husband present, 7.7% had a male householder with no wife present, and 42.3% were non-families. 40.4% of all households were made up of individuals, and 26.9% had someone living alone who was 65 years of age or older. The average household size was 2.04 and the average family size was 2.67.

The median age in the village was 45 years. 20.8% of residents were under the age of 18; 8.4% were between the ages of 18 and 24; 20.8% were from 25 to 44; 26.5% were from 45 to 64; and 23.6% were 65 years of age or older. The gender makeup of the village was 54.7% male and 45.3% female.

=== 2000 census ===
As of the census of 2000, there were 111 people, 53 households, and 29 families residing in the village. The population density was 495.0 inhabitants per square mile (191.1/km^{2}). There were 62 housing units at an average density of 276.5 per square mile (106.8/km^{2}). The racial makeup of the village was 100.00% White. Hispanic or Latino of any race were 1.80% of the population.

There were 53 households, out of which 18.9% had children under the age of 18 living with them, 52.8% were married couples living together, 1.9% had a female householder with no husband present, and 43.4% were non-families. 35.8% of all households were made up of individuals, and 17.0% had someone living alone who was 65 years of age or older. The average household size was 2.09 and the average family size was 2.70.

In the village, the population was spread out, with 19.8% under the age of 18, 3.6% from 18 to 24, 24.3% from 25 to 44, 29.7% from 45 to 64, and 22.5% who were 65 years of age or older. The median age was 48 years. For every 100 females, there were 109.4 males. For every 100 females age 18 and over, there were 111.9 males.

As of 2000 the median income for a household in the village was $27,813, and the median income for a family was $32,188. Males had a median income of $23,958 versus $25,625 for females. The per capita income for the village was $15,708. There were no families and 8.4% of the population living below the poverty line, including no under eighteens and 19.4% of those over 64.

== See also ==
- List of municipalities in Nebraska
