= Burke, South Dakota =

- City
- Location in Gregory County and the state of South Dakota
- Coordinates: 43°10′58″N 99°17′32″W
- Country: United States
- State: South Dakota
- County: Gregory
- Incorporated: 1906

Area
  - Total: 0.56 sq mi (1.45 km^{2})
  - Land: 0.56 sq mi (1.45 km^{2})
  - Water: 0 sq mi (0.00 km^{2})
- Elevation: 2,192 ft (668 m)

Population (2020)
  - Total: 575
  - Density: 1,028.3/sq mi (397.04/km^{2})
- Time zone: UTC-6 (Central (CST))
  - Summer (DST): UTC-5 (CDT)
- ZIP code: 57523
- Area code: 605
- FIPS code: 46-08700
- GNIS feature ID: 1267304
- Website: www.burkesouthdakota.com

Burke is a city in and county seat of Gregory County, South Dakota, United States. The population was 575 at the 2020 census.

== History ==
Burke was laid out in 1904 and incorporated in 1906. It was named for congressman Charles H. Burke.

== Geography ==
According to the United States Census Bureau, the city has a total area of 0.56 square miles (1.45 km^{2}), all land.

== Demographics ==
Historical population
Census	Pop.	Note	%±
1910	311		—
1920	628		101.9%
1930	605		−3.7%
1940	602		−0.5%
1950	829		37.7%
1960	811		−2.2%
1970	892		10.0%
1980	859		−3.7%
1990	756		−12.0%
2000	676		−10.6%
2010	604		−10.7%
2020	575		−4.8%
U.S. Decennial Census

=== 2020 census ===
As of the 2020 census, Burke had a population of 575. The median age was 54.7 years. 16.0% of residents were under the age of 18 and 34.8% of residents were 65 years of age or older. For every 100 females there were 83.7 males, and for every 100 females age 18 and over there were 81.6 males age 18 and over.

0.0% of residents lived in urban areas, while 100.0% lived in rural areas.

There were 310 households in Burke, of which 17.7% had children under the age of 18 living in them. Of all households, 42.9% were married-couple households, 20.6% were households with a male householder and no spouse or partner present, and 32.6% were households with a female householder and no spouse or partner present. About 44.8% of all households were made up of individuals and 26.1% had someone living alone who was 65 years of age or older.

There were 345 housing units, of which 10.1% were vacant. The homeowner vacancy rate was 0.0% and the rental vacancy rate was 7.0%.

Racial composition as of the 2020 census
Race	Number	Percent
White	538	93.6%
Black or African American	0	0.0%
American Indian and Alaska Native	15	2.6%
Asian	0	0.0%
Native Hawaiian and Other Pacific Islander	0	0.0%
Some other race	0	0.0%
Two or more races	22	3.8%
Hispanic or Latino (of any race)	5	0.9%

=== 2010 census ===
As of the census of 2010, there were 604 people, 324 households, and 161 families residing in the city. The population density was 1,078.6 inhabitants per square mile (416.4/km^{2}). There were 398 housing units at an average density of 710.7 per square mile (274.4/km^{2}). The racial makeup of the city was 94.2% White, 0.2% African American, 3.5% Native American, 0.2% from other races, and 2.0% from two or more races. Hispanic or Latino of any race were 0.7% of the population.

There were 324 households, of which 19.4% had children under the age of 18 living with them, 42.9% were married couples living together, 4.6% had a female householder with no husband present, 2.2% had a male householder with no wife present, and 50.3% were non-families. 48.5% of all households were made up of individuals, and 27.8% had someone living alone who was 65 years of age or older. The average household size was 1.86 and the average family size was 2.62.

The median age in the city was 52.2 years. 17.9% of residents were under the age of 18; 3.9% were between the ages of 18 and 24; 18.3% were from 25 to 44; 30.4% were from 45 to 64; and 29.5% were 65 years of age or older. The gender makeup of the city was 44.5% male and 55.5% female.

=== 2000 census ===
As of the census of 2000, there were 676 people, 327 households, and 177 families residing in the city. The population density was 1,210.1 inhabitants per square mile (467.2/km^{2}). There were 385 housing units at an average density of 689.2 per square mile (266.1/km^{2}). The racial makeup of the city was 97.49% White, 1.78% Native American, and 0.74% from two or more races.

There were 327 households, out of which 22.3% had children under the age of 18 living with them, 47.4% were married couples living together, 4.9% had a female householder with no husband present, and 45.6% were non-families. 44.3% of all households were made up of individuals, and 30.0% had someone living alone who was 65 years of age or older. The average household size was 2.03 and the average family size was 2.85.

In the city, the population was spread out, with 21.7% under the age of 18, 3.8% from 18 to 24, 20.4% from 25 to 44, 23.1% from 45 to 64, and 30.9% who were 65 years of age or older. The median age was 48 years. For every 100 females, there were 77.9 males. For every 100 females age 18 and over, there were 74.0 males.

The median income for a household in the city was $23,056, and the median income for a family was $32,333. Males had a median income of $23,438 versus $19,250 for females. The per capita income for the city was $14,210. About 7.2% of families and 15.7% of the population were below the poverty line, including 12.9% of those under age 18 and 22.5% of those age 65 or over.

== Education ==
Burke Public Schools are part of the Burke School District. The district has one elementary school, one middle school, and one high school. Students attend Burke High School.

== Notable people ==
- Julie Bartling - South Dakota State Senator
- Kathy Lou Schultz - American poet and scholar
- Billie Sutton, State Senator and 2018 candidate for Governor

== See also ==
- List of cities in South Dakota
