= National Register of Historic Places listings in Tripp County, South Dakota =

Location of Tripp County in South Dakota

This is a list of the National Register of Historic Places listings in Tripp County, South Dakota.

This is intended to be a complete list of the properties on the National Register of Historic Places in Tripp County, South Dakota, United States. The locations of National Register properties for which the latitude and longitude coordinates are included below, may be seen in a map.

There are 6 properties listed on the National Register in the county.

This National Park Service list is complete through NPS recent listings posted March 14, 2025.

== Current listings ==
	Name on the Register	Image	Date listed	Location	City or town	Description
1	E. G. Barnum House	E. G. Barnum House	January 27, 1983 (#83003020)	205 Van Buren; 43°22′34″N 99°51′37″W	Winner	
2	Lewis Bridge	Lewis Bridge	June 29, 1992 (#92000774)	County road over the Keya Paha River, 13.6 miles northeast of Springview, Nebraska; 42°59′53″N 99°38′08″W	Wewela	Extends into Keya Paha County, Nebraska
3	Manthey Barn	Manthey Barn	January 28, 2004 (#03001533)	31952 289th St. 43°12′48″N 99°46′51″W	Colome	
4	South Dakota Dept. of Transportation Bridge No. 62-220-512	South Dakota Dept. of Transportation Bridge No. 62-220-512	December 9, 1993 (#93001321)	Local road over the Keya Paha River; 43°02′12″N 99°48′38″W	Wewela	
5	Tripp County Veteran's Memorial	Tripp County Veteran's Memorial	November 17, 2009 (#09000947)	200 E. 3rd St. 43°22′33″N 99°51′17″W	Winner	
6	Wewela Hall	Wewela Hall	November 29, 2010 (#10000952)	Lots 3 and 4, Block 34, Government Townsite of Wewela; 43°00′46″N 99°47′03″W	Wewela	

== See also ==
- List of National Historic Landmarks in South Dakota
- National Register of Historic Places listings in South Dakota
