= Tornado outbreak of May 5–8, 1965 =

Tornado outbreak in the central United States

- Tornado tracks through Minneapolis–Saint Paul on May 6

Meteorological history
- Duration: May 5–8, 1965

Tornado outbreak
- Tornadoes: 72
- Max. rating: F5 tornado
- Duration: 3 days, 7 hours, 2 minutes

Overall effects
- Fatalities: 17
- Injuries: 770
- Damage: Estimated $51 million
- Areas affected: Great Plains and Midwestern United States
- Part of the tornado outbreaks of 1965

On May 5–8, 1965, a significant tornado outbreak (Note: An outbreak is generally defined as a group of at least six tornadoes (the number sometimes varies slightly according to local climatology) with no more than a six-hour gap between individual tornadoes. An outbreak sequence, prior to (after) modern records that began in 1950, is defined as, at most, two (one) consecutive days without at least one significant (F2 or stronger) tornado.) (Note: All damage totals are in 1965 United States dollars unless otherwise noted.) affected much of the Central United States. For four consecutive days, tornado outbreaks produced at least three significant (F2+) tornadoes each day, and at least two violent (F4–F5) tornadoes on three of the four days. The entire sequence generated 37 significant tornadoes, including at least nine violent tornadoes, one of which was rated F5. On May 5, two F4s struck Iowa, including a long-tracked tornado family that injured 11 people. On May 6, an outbreak of six strong tornadoes, four of them violent F4s, affected Minneapolis and St. Paul, Minnesota, and has been nicknamed "The Longest Night", killing 13 people and causing major damages—at the time the most damaging single weather event in Minnesota history. Three of the six tornadoes occurred on the ground simultaneously, and two of them hit the section of Minnesota State Highway 100 (now Interstate 694) and University Avenue in the city of Fridley. Both Fridley tornadoes damaged 1,100 homes and destroyed about 425; total losses reached $14.5 million, $5 million of which was to the Fridley school system.

On May 7, three significant tornadoes hit portions of the Upper Midwest, and beginning early on May 8, a major tornado outbreak affected the Great Plains states, particularly in Nebraska and South Dakota. The outbreak on May 8 produced numerous significant, long-lived tornadoes, including at least three violent tornadoes, two of which were actually long-tracked tornado families. A very large F5 tornado struck Tripp County in South Dakota, and two major F4s tracked across parts of Greeley and Antelope Counties in Nebraska. One of the F4s struck the small village of Primrose, almost totally destroying the settlement, causing probable F5 damage, and killing four people. Additionally, a high-end F3 obliterated a farm in Gregory County, South Dakota, and may have been an F4 as well. Many of the individual tornadoes on May 8 moved north and northwest, an unusual trajectory for supercells in this part of the Great Plains. Many of the long-tracked tornadoes on this date, rather than single tornadoes, were probably tornado families like the two long-lived F4s.

== Meteorological synopsis ==
Temperatures on May 6 were in the upper 70s °F with high dew points, which was considered to be unusual for early May in Minnesota. A strong low pressure area associated with an upper-level system moving in from the southwest and a nearby slow-moving cold front helped spark the storms. These storms formed as training supercells—an atmospheric phenomenon that is extremely rare in Minnesota. Because of the training, the same general areas from Sibley County through Carver and Hennepin and into northwestern Ramsey counties kept getting the brunt of these cells.

== Confirmed tornadoes ==
Outbreak death toll
State	Total	County	County total
Minnesota	13	Anoka	3
Minnesota	13	Carver	3
Minnesota	13	Hennepin	6
Minnesota	13	Sibley	1
Nebraska	4	Boone	4
Totals	17		
All deaths were tornado-related

Confirmed tornadoes by Fujita rating
FU	F0	F1	F2	F3	F4	F5	Total
10	14	15	22	6	8	1	72

=== May 5 ===
List of confirmed tornadoes
F#	Location	County	Time (UTC)	Path length	Damage
Iowa
F2	Hartley to W of Sibley	O'Brien, Osceola	2030	21.8 miles (35.1 km)	
F4	S of Rinard to NE of Callender	Calhoun, Webster	2215	9.9 miles (15.9 km)	An intense tornado damaged eight farms near Farnhamville before hitting the south side of Slifer. The tornado destroyed a church and a parsonage, both of which were swept away.
F4	Osage to N of Kendallville	Floyd, Howard, Winneshiek	0200	41.6 miles (66.9 km)	Two large farmhouses were leveled three miles (4.8 km) northwest of Kendallville, and about 28 farms were destroyed. All 11 injuries occurred in Mitchell County. The tornado was probably a family of several tornadoes, and it may have been continuous with the F3 tornado near Harmony, Minnesota, listed farther below.
South Dakota
F1	Near Elkton	Brookings	2045	34.7 miles (55.8 km)	Three farms were reported damaged.
North Dakota
FU	W of Leal	Barnes	2100	unknown	Brief touchdown.
F2	NE of Leonard to NW of Harwood	Cass	2315	33.8 miles (54.4 km)	This tornado family moved erratically northward, destroying barns, sheds, and other farm buildings. Seven farms were hit. At least two separate tornadoes, two hours apart, may have produced damage.
Texas
F0	W of Spofford	Kinney	2300	0.1 miles (0.16 km)	
F1	NE of Wingate	Runnels, Taylor	0300	0.1 miles (0.16 km)	
Minnesota
F1	SE of Sauk Centre	Stearns	2320	0.5 miles (0.80 km)	
F2	NW of Alexandria to NW of Wolf Lake	Douglas, Otter Tail, Becker	2330	24.3 miles (39.1 km)	A tornado destroyed lakeside cottages near Lake Darling and badly damaged structures on eight farms as well. The tornado continued on to Big Toad Lake, where it destroyed a large, two-story "summer home." Five other homes and cottages sustained minor damage. A family of two separate tornadoes may have been involved.
F1	S of Gaylord to E of New Auburn	Sibley	2345	11.2 miles (18.0 km)	
F3	S of Harmony to SE of Melrose, WI	Fillmore, Houston, Winona, La Crosse (WI)	0100	65.2 miles (104.9 km)	This tornado may have consisted of two separate tornadoes, with the path of the first ending, and the second beginning, in Houston County. Homes and barns were reported destroyed near Canton, Lenora, and Newburg. Farther along the path, more barns and a brick schoolhouse were also destroyed. As the tornado crossed into Wisconsin, it destroyed more buildings on several farms. A car in Wisconsin was moved 75 feet (23 m) as well.
F0	SE of Elgin	Wabasha	0225	0.3 miles (0.48 km)	
F0	NW of Rushford Village	Winona	0300	0.2 miles (0.32 km)	A brief tornado destroyed two farms near Fremont. Rating disputed, ranked F2 by Grazulis.
F2	W of Le Roy to NE of Racine	Mower, Fillmore	0304	23.6 miles (38.0 km)	A tornado destroyed a barn and damaged 20 farms in its path.
Wisconsin
F2	W of Grantsburg to W of Webster	Burnett	0215	14.3 miles (23.0 km)	
F2	NW of Cumberland to S of Barronett	Barron	0530	4.5 miles (7.2 km)	
Source: National Climatic Database Center

=== May 6 ===
List of confirmed tornadoes
F#	Location	County	Time (UTC)	Path length	Damage
Minnesota
F4	NE of Cologne to N of Crystal Bay	Carver	0008	13 miles (21 km)	3 deaths – The first of four powerful F4 tornadoes touched down just east of Cologne in Carver County. The tornado struck the Island Park–Mound area, where it destroyed 17 homes, some of which were leveled. The tornado then struck and destroyed most of the Navarre community, where 16 homes were destroyed. The tornado also destroyed all barns and outbuildings on 30 farms. Homes were destroyed on 20 farms as well. According to a 1975 map, which contains the most revised data on the May 6 tornadoes, the tornado dissipated north of Crystal Bay.
F4	Chanhassen to S of Wayzata	Carver	0027	7 miles (11 km)	The second of the four F4 tornadoes—and the first of two to be photographed this day—touched down near Lake Susan in Chanhassen and traveled seven miles (11 km) toward Deephaven in Hennepin County. The first damage was reported south of Chanhassen, where 30 homes were damaged or destroyed. The tornado traveled due north, causing damage to a lumberyard and a shopping center. The tornado then damaged 35 homes at Lotus Lake and damaged or destroyed another 50 at Christmas Lake. As the tornado continued into Deephaven, it destroyed 100 homes, some of which were completely leveled, including "large and expensive" homes. According to official sources, the tornado dissipated after hitting Deephaven, and only two tornadoes hit Fridley; however, Grazulis reports that the tornado turned northeast, continuing beyond Deephaven, passing just south of Medicine Lake, striking Golden Valley, and hitting Fridley at 7:10 p.m. (0110 UTC). Six homes were reportedly damaged in Golden Valley, "clocks stopped" in Fridley, and 25 airplanes were damaged or destroyed at Anoka County-Blaine Airport in Blaine. However, the official records end this tornado near Deephaven and only indicate that two tornadoes, not three, hit Fridley.
F3	E of New Auburn to NW of Lester Prairie	Sibley, McLeod	0034	16 miles (26 km)	Tornado touched down about three miles (4.8 km) east of New Auburn in Sibley County and moved to just west of Lester Prairie in McLeod County. The tornado damaged or destroyed at least 25 farm buildings, as well as a church and a school, but there were no injuries or fatalities. Damage reached $1,000,000 (1965 USD).
F2	E of Green Isle to NE of Norwood Young America	Sibley, Carver	0043	11 miles (18 km)	1 death – Tornado touched down about two miles (3.2 km) east of Green Isle in Sibley County and was on the ground 11 miles (18 km). It dissipated about two miles (3.2 km) southwest of Waconia in Carver County. A farmer and his cattle were killed three miles (4.8 km) southeast of Hamburg. Photographs showed that nearby trees were debarked and shredded. The tornado was up to 0.75 miles (1.21 km) wide near Norwood Young America and Waconia. Three barns were reportedly destroyed southwest of Cologne at 7:15 p.m. (0115 UTC), but Grazulis counts the damage as being related to a second F2 tornado (not officially listed). 175 people were injured which, as of 2022, in the most injuries caused by an F2/EF2 tornado.
F4	SW of Columbia Heights to Fridley to N of Spring Lake Park	Hennepin, Anoka	0106	7 miles (11 km)	3 deaths – See section on this tornado The first of at least two tornadoes to hit Fridley touched down in the southwesternmost corner of Fridley in Anoka County. It then moved across the Northern Ordnance industrial plant and continued to Osborne Road and Highway 65. At this point, the tornado was visually spectacular and, like the Deephaven tornado, was one of the two tornadoes to be photographed during the outbreak. The funnel then struck Fridley directly, hitting the main school and park complex, the city hall, and a trailer court. Three hundred people were attending an evening program in Fridley Junior High when the tornado struck, but only a single child was injured. The tornado eventually struck hundreds of homes in Fridley before continuing north-northeast into Spring Lake Park. There, the tornado was at its greatest intensity, destroying 150 homes and leveling some of them. Seventy-five percent of all the businesses in Spring Lake Park were reported destroyed, and 900 people in the town were said to be homeless. 175 people were injured. The tornado dissipated just northeast of Laddie Lake in Blaine in Anoka County.
F4	Golden Valley to Fridley to Lino Lakes	Hennepin, Anoka, Ramsey	0214	18 miles (29 km)	6 deaths – See section on this tornado The last and deadliest violent tornado of the day touched down in Golden Valley in Hennepin County and moved across north Minneapolis, Fridley in Anoka County, and Mounds View in Ramsey County before dissipating just west of Centerville in Anoka County. Like the previous event, this tornado also struck the Northern Ordnance industrial plant. Total damage from the two tornadoes at the Northern Ordnance plant reached $2 million (1965 USD) in damage, shutting down the plant for more than one month. Next, the tornado damaged 25 homes and eight businesses when it hit Golden Valley. The tornado then became the second of the day to hit Fridley, and even struck the same trailer park in Fridley hit by the previous tornado. The tornado also destroyed 85% of an elementary school. In Fridley, some homes were hit more than once by multiple tornadoes. As it continued into Mounds View, the tornado completely leveled numerous homes, killing six people. In all, 46 homes in Mounds View were destroyed, and losses reached about $1 million (1965 USD). 158 people were injured.
Oklahoma
F2	NW of Loyal	Kingfisher	0000	0.1 miles (0.16 km)	A brief touchdown destroyed a barn, a shop, a granary, and a shed. It also damaged four homes and two "combines."
F2	SE of Dodson, TX, to W of Granite, OK	Harmon, Greer	0050	31.3 miles (50.4 km)	This tornado may have begun in Texas. It damaged or destroyed at least six homes, 10 barns, a gin, a store, a church, and a school.
F1	SE of Canton	Blaine	0100	0.1 miles (0.16 km)	
F0	Oakwood	Dewey	0100	0.1 miles (0.16 km)	
F1	Dewey	Washington	0300	0.1 miles (0.16 km)	
Nebraska
F0	E of Newcastle	Dixon	0145	0.1 miles (0.16 km)	
Source: National Climatic Database Center

=== May 7 ===
List of confirmed tornadoes
F#	Location	County	Time (UTC)	Path length	Damage
Wisconsin
F2	S of Shell Lake	Washburn	1430	1 mile (1.6 km)	A brief tornado unroofed a school in which 300 students sheltered, but none were hurt.
South Dakota
FU	NE of Lake Andes	Charles Mix	1830	unknown	
Iowa
FU	Oelwein	Fayette	1855	unknown	
FU	Fairfield	Van Buren	2030	unknown	
Kansas
F0	S of Garden City	Finney	2200	0.1 miles (0.16 km)	
F2	N of Pierceville	Finney	2200	0.1 miles (0.16 km)	
F2	N of Cimarron	Finney	2200	0.1 miles (0.16 km)	
Minnesota
F0	SW of Kenyon	Le Seur	0010	0.5 miles (0.80 km)	
Oklahoma
F0	Arnett	Ellis	0050	0.8 miles (1.3 km)	
Texas
F0	S of Wheeler	Wheeler	0050	0.1 miles (0.16 km)	
Source: National Climatic Database Center

=== May 8 ===
List of confirmed tornadoes
F#	Location	County	Time (UTC)	Path length	Damage
Colorado
F2	N of Nunn	Weld	0900	1 mile (1.6 km)	A brief touchdown caused damage to farm structures, equipment, and trees.
Wisconsin
F1	N of Waukesha	Waukesha	1915	2 miles (3.2 km)	
Oklahoma
F0	SE of Randlett	Cotton	2000	0.1 miles (0.16 km)	
F1	SW of Barnsdall	Osage	2200	0.1 miles (0.16 km)	
F1	N of Stidham	McIntosh	0300	0.1 miles (0.16 km)	
F0	S of Marietta	Love	0310	0.1 miles (0.16 km)	
Kansas
FU	SW of Independence	Montgomery	2115	1 mile (1.6 km)	A tornado caused $4,000 (1965 USD) in damage near the Independence Municipal Airport.
FU	N of Girard	Crawford	2315	unknown	Brief touchdown.
Nebraska
F3	N of Saint Michael to SW of Farwell	Howard	2200	10.2 miles (16.4 km)	A tornado unroofed some homes and barns and passed northwest of Boelus.
F4	NW of Farwell to Orchard	Howard, Greeley, Wheeler, Antelope,	2225	78.9 miles (127.0 km)	This long-tracked tornado was likely a family of multiple violent tornadoes. The tornado destroyed numerous farms, many of which were entirely leveled. Two people sheltering in a basement north of Greeley may have been injured, but these injuries are not listed officially.
F2	SE of Long Pine to NW of Mills	Rock, Keya Paha	2230	44.9 miles (72.3 km)	A long-lived tornado leveled a farmhouse and may have injured a man fleeing in a pickup truck. The tornado also destroyed buildings on "at least a dozen" farms northwest of Newport. This event may have been two separate tornadoes, one four miles (6.4 km) east of Bassett and another northwest of Newport. Rating disputed, ranked F3 by Grazulis.
F2	E of Johnstown	Brown, Keya Paha	2230	9 miles (14 km)	A strong tornado destroyed three homes on at least seven ranches, along with other structures. Vehicles were thrown up to one-half mile (0.80 km) from where they originated. According to Grazulis, this tornado caused near-F4 damage to ranches six miles (9.7 km) northwest of Ainsworth, though the official rating is only F2. The tornado may have stayed on the ground as far as Wewela, South Dakota, and the parent storm eventually produced an F5 tornado near Colome in South Dakota.
F3	Hebron to E of Cordova	Thayer, Fillmore, Saline, Seward	2240	40.1 miles (64.5 km)	A long-lived tornado leveled a barn three miles (4.8 km) east of Ohiowa. Several farms were reportedly destroyed as well.
F3	SW of Chambers to Saratoga	Holt	2300	44.8 miles (72.1 km)	A long-tracked tornado destroyed and swept away many barns. A car was thrown 200 yards (180 m), and ranches were completely destroyed.
F1	Stapleton to S of Valentine	Logan, Thomas, Cherry	2300	89.8 miles (144.5 km)	A long-lived tornado did "major damage" near Thedford, destroying at least one barn. Rating disputed, ranked F2 by Grazulis.
F1	N of Eagle	Cass	2300	0.1 miles (0.16 km)	Brief touchdown reported.
F4	N of Wood River to Wausa	Hall, Greeley, Boone, Antelope, Cedar	2330	125.7 miles (202.3 km)	4 deaths – This long-lived family of violent tornadoes destroyed 90% of the village of Primrose. The tornado was reported to have had two funnels as it hit Primrose. Homes were swept from their foundations, and the damage swath was 300 yards (270 m) wide. Tree damage in the village was severe. Vehicles were thrown hundreds of yards, and there may have been F5 damage to buildings as well. Cars were carried for 400 yards (370 m), and a truck body was carried and rolled for two miles (3.2 km). 53 people were injured, and four were dead at Primrose. At least one horse was killed.
F2	E of Ainsworth	Brown, Keya Paha	2330	4.1 miles (6.6 km)	A tornado passed east of Ainsworth.
F1	W of Hampton	Hamilton	2330	0.1 miles (0.16 km)	Brief touchdown occurred between Aurora and Hampton.
F1	N of Phillips to NE of Chapman	Hamilton	2335	7.2 miles (11.6 km)	A tornado destroyed all the buildings except the farmhouse on a farm. Rating disputed, ranked F2 by Grazulis.
F0	W of Spencer	Boyd	0000	0.1 miles (0.16 km)	Brief touchdown witnessed.
F2	Columbus to W of Clarkson	Platte, Colfax	0000	24 miles (39 km)	A tornado skipped along and destroyed structures on several farms.
F1	E of Winside to Dakota City	Wayne, Dixon, Dakota	0030	41.5 miles (66.8 km)	A skipping tornado caused mostly minor damage, but produced major damage to a farm northeast of Wayne.
South Dakota
FU	N of Fort Thompson	Buffalo	2200	unknown	
F5	E of Wewela to NE of Winner	Tripp	2315	30 miles (48 km)	See section on this tornado. This huge tornado, about one mile (1.6 km) wide, damaged 25 farms, destroyed seven farms, and completely swept away three of them near Gregory.
F2	SW of Colome	Tripp	2323	0.1 miles (0.16 km)	
F3	SW of Burke	Gregory	0000	1.5 miles (2.4 km)	A brief tornado moved northwest and destroyed all buildings on a farm, including two homes, a concrete barn, and a wooden barn. Vehicles and machinery were mangled into unrecognizable shapes. Rating disputed, ranked F4 by Grazulis.
F2	SE of Howard	Miner	0030	3.3 miles (5.3 km)	Moved northwest, north of Canova. Some farm structures were damaged, and cattle were killed.
F1	SE of Onida	Sully	0030	0.1 miles (0.16 km)	
F2	W of Baltic to NE of Colton	Clay	0100	4.5 miles (7.2 km)	Barns and concrete silos were destroyed on three farms.
F2	SW of Pukwana	Brule	0100	4.3 miles (6.9 km)	A tornado moved northwest, destroying newly built barns on two farms, along with several silos.
F0	NW of Gettysburg	Potter	0100	0.1 miles (0.16 km)	Brief touchdown over open country.
FU	NW of Oahe Dam	Stanley	0200	unknown	
F0	SW of Akaska	Potter	0332	0.1 miles (0.16 km)	
FU	SE of Timber Lake	Dewey	0425	unknown	
FU	SW of Mobridge	Corson	0435	unknown	
Arkansas
F2	SE of Fort Smith	0230	Sebastian	5.1 miles (8.2 km)	A tornado destroyed motel cabins and tore roofs and walls from homes. Business buildings sustained damage on seven farms.
Source: National Climatic Database Center

=== Fridley, Minnesota F4 Tornadoes (Two tornadoes) ===
Fridley, Minnesota F4 Tornadoes
Meteorological history
- Formed: May 6, 1965

F4 tornado
- on the Fujita scale
- Highest winds: 207 to 260 mph (333 to 418 km/h)

Overall effects
- Casualties: 22
- Fatalities: 9; 3 from the first F4 and 6 more from the other
- Injuries: 333; 175 from the first F4, and 158 from the other
- Damage: $14.5 million (1965 USD)
- Areas affected: Fridley, Minnesota Area

Two tornadoes touched down in Fridley, just over an hour apart. In all, six people were killed in the Fridley tornadoes and over 180 were injured. Over 450 homes were destroyed in Fridley, and neighboring Mounds View also sustained heavy damage. A man who called WCCO radio after the first Fridley tornado claimed on air that he had been in his car when the tornado hit and that the tornado blew out his car windows. Although he is widely believed to have been killed by the second Fridley tornado later that night (which did kill a 26-year-old man with a similar name), the caller was actually a teacher at Fridley Junior High School who survived. The tornado also damaged the sign adorning the Heights Theater in Columbia Heights. In all, both Fridley tornadoes damaged 1,100 homes and destroyed about 425; total losses reached $14.5 million, $5 million of which was to the Fridley school system. Photographs for the earlier Deephaven and second Fridley tornado were published in the Minneapolis Tribune (now Star Tribune) newspaper. Early radar images showed the supercells as they moved through the area.

=== Colome, South Dakota ===
Colome, South Dakota
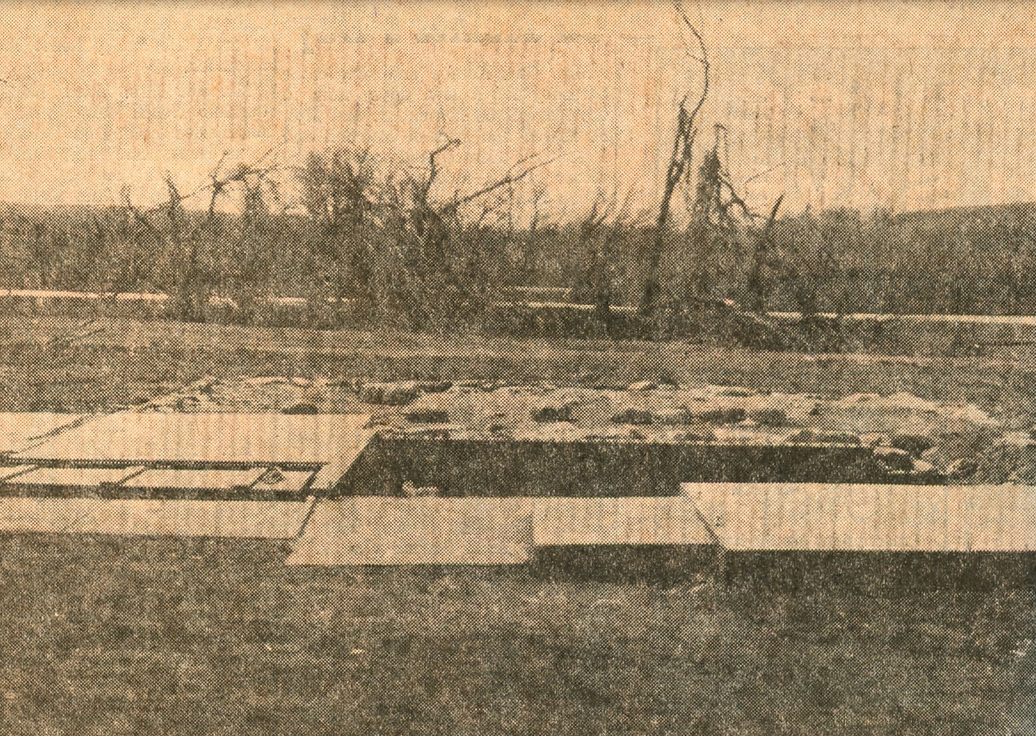
- F5 damage near Colome

Meteorological history
- Formed: May 8, 1965

F5 tornado
- on the Fujita scale
- Highest winds: 261–318 mph (420–512 km/h)

Overall effects
- Casualties: 1
- Injuries: 1
- Areas affected: Colome, South Dakota

This extremely intense and massive F5 tornado passed east of the town of Colome, South Dakota, in Tripp County, and became the only tornado to be rated as such in South Dakota's history. The tornado reached 1,760 yards (1.00 mi), or 1,610 metres (1.61 km) in width and would destroy seven farms with three being swept clean at F5 intensity, only leaving empty basements behind. A car was thrown and was badly damaged, another car would be flipped on its back, and entire planks would be embedded into the ground. Fortunately, the tornado resulted in no deaths, but there was an injury. In all, the tornado was on the ground for 30.10 miles (48.44 kilometers) and would become the strongest-rated tornado of the outbreak and the strongest tornado in South Dakota state history.

== Aftermath ==
The outbreak in Minnesota on May 6 was voted a tie by the Minnesota Climatology Office for the "fifth most significant Minnesota Weather Event of the 20th Century" with the 1965 Mississippi & Minnesota River Flooding. Considering this outbreak occurred just three weeks after the Palm Sunday tornado outbreak, quick and successful warnings from the U.S. Weather Bureau and transmission from WCCO Radio kept the death toll relatively low. This was also the first time in Minnesota state history where civil defense sirens were used for severe weather purposes.

== See also ==
- Climate of Minnesota
- List of North American tornadoes and tornado outbreaks
