= South Dakota Highway 53 =

State highway in South Dakota, United States

Highway 53

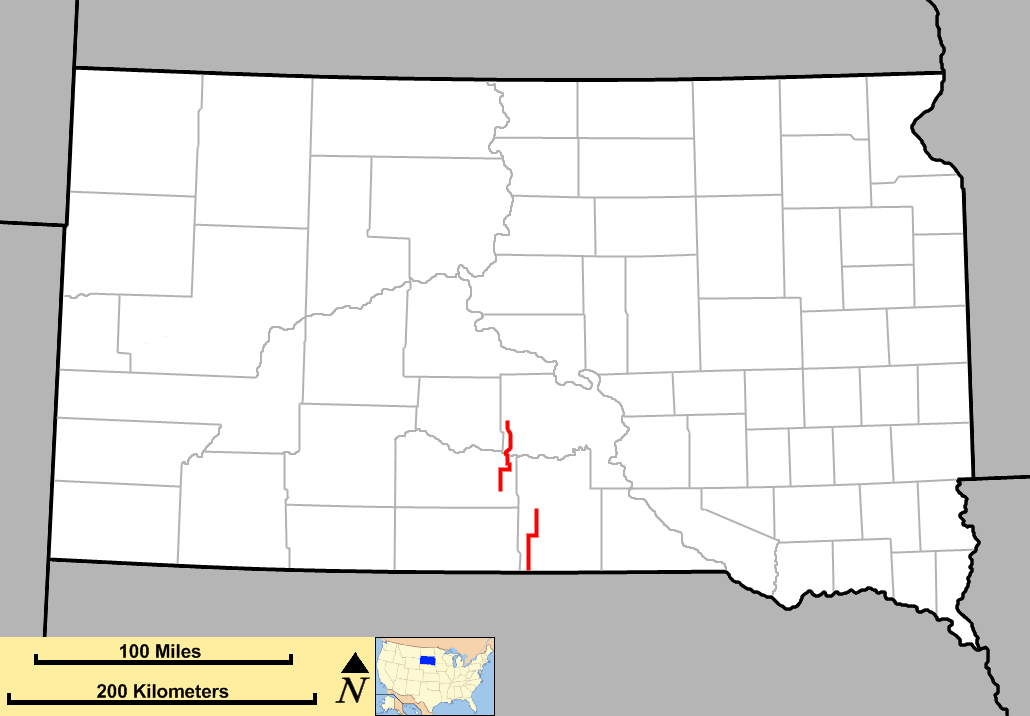
- Route of SD 53 (in red)

Route information
- Maintained by SDDOT
- Length: 67.475 mi (108.590 km)
- Existed: 1926–present

Southern segment
- Length: 34.372 mi (55.316 km)
- South end: Nebraska state line
- North end: US 18 west of Winner

Northern segment
- Length: 33.103 mi (53.274 km)
- South end: SD 44 east of Wood
- North end: I-90 / US 83 in Vivian

Location
- Country: United States
- State: South Dakota
- Counties: Lyman, Mellette, Tripp

Highway system
- South Dakota State Trunk Highway System; Interstate; US; State
| ← SD 52 | → SD 54 |

South Dakota Highway 53 (SD 53) is a state route that runs north to south across south central South Dakota. It consists of two separate segments:

- Junction with Interstate 90 and U.S. Highway 83 near Vivian to South Dakota Highway 44 east of Wood. This segment is 33 miles (53 km) in length.
- U.S. Highway 18 west of Winner to the Nebraska border southeast of Keyapaha. This segment is 34 miles (55 km) in length.

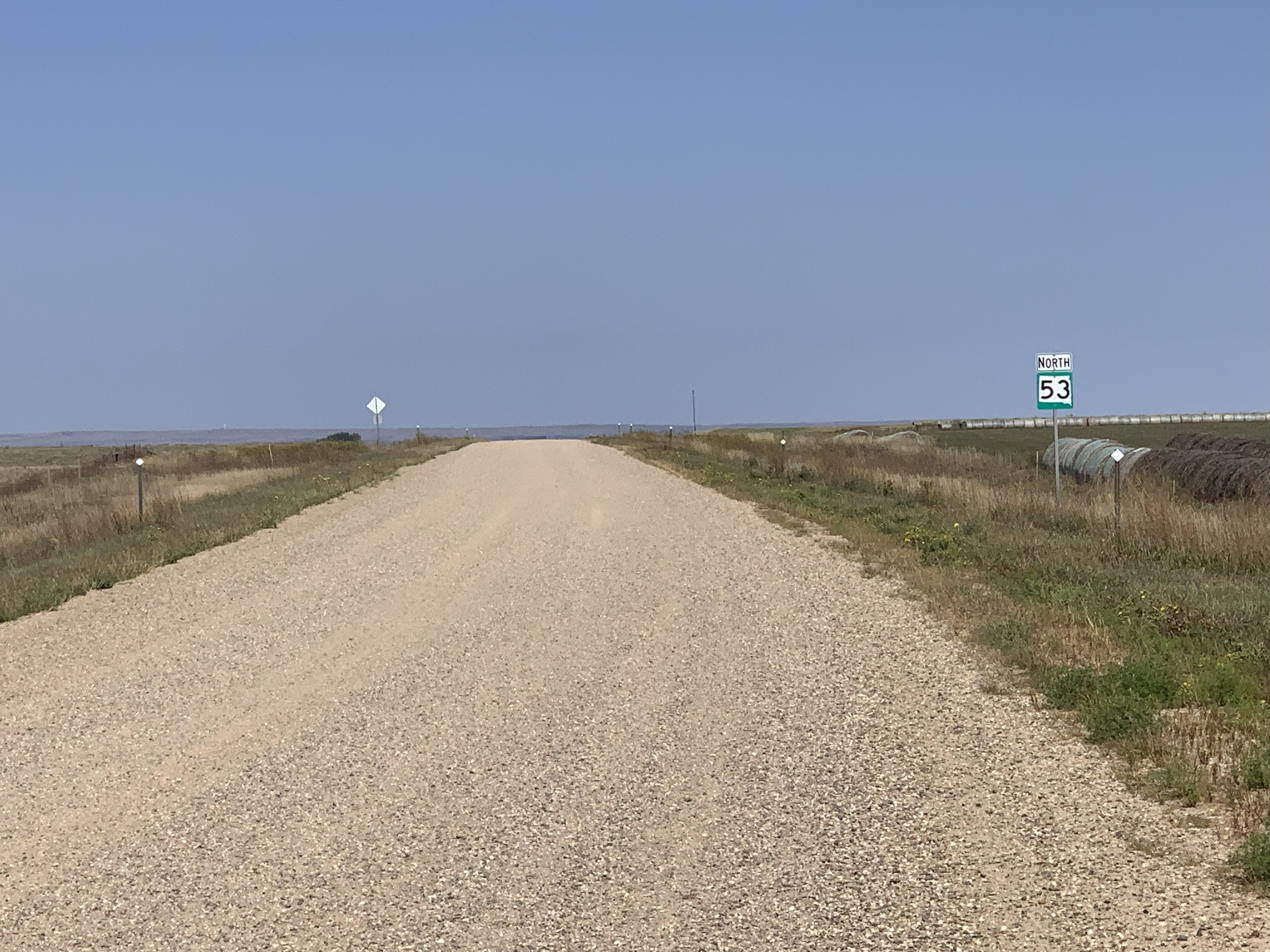
South Dakota Highway 53

== History ==
South Dakota 53 in 1926 ran from the North Dakota to Nebraska borders. By 1929, when U.S. Highway 83 was first designated, it replaced the segment of SD 53 from Pierre to the North Dakota border. The southern segment was further east than the present route, running from Presho south to the Nebraska border via Winner.

In the early 1930s, U.S. 83 was extended south into Nebraska, and was placed as dual signage along SD 53. (The original route was on what is now U.S. Highway 183; 83 and 183 were reversed from current alignments when first designated.) By 1935, SD 53 was removed from this alignment and placed on a new route extending south from Vivian, on a previously unnumbered road. The southern terminus was at South Dakota Highway 40 (now 44). Also at this time, the northern terminus was pulled back to Vivian.

In the late 1960s, a second segment of SD 53 was added further south, beginning at U.S. Highway 18 just west of the U.S. 183 junction, and extending south to Clearfield.

In 1996, the southern terminus of SD 53 was extended to the Nebraska border.

== Major intersections ==
| County | Location | mi | km | Destinations | Notes |
|---|---|---|---|---|---|
| Tripp | | 0.000 | 0.000 | End state maintenance at the Nebraska state line | |
| Tripp | Clearfield | 18.400 | 29.612 | Signed south end of SD 53 | |
| Tripp | | 34.372 | 55.316 | US 18 | |
Gap in route
| Mellette | | 34.372 | 55.316 | SD 44 | |
| Lyman | Vivian | 67.475 | 108.590 | I-90 / US 83 | I-90 exit 212 |
1.000 mi = 1.609 km; 1.000 km = 0.621 mi
