= Keya Paha =

Keya Paha or Keyapaha may refer to one of the following:

- Keya Paha County, Nebraska
- Keyapaha, South Dakota
- Keya Paha River
