= U.S. Route 183 =

Numbered Highway in the United States

U.S. Route 183
- US 183 highlighted in red

Route information
- Auxiliary route of US 83
- Length: 1,244.3 mi (2,002.5 km)
- Existed: 1930–present

Major junctions
- South end: US 77 / US 77 Alt. at Refugio, TX
- I-10 at Luling, TX; I-35 at Austin, TX; I-20 at Cisco, TX; I-40 at Clinton, OK; US-50 / US-56 near Kinsley, KS; I-70 / US-40 at Hays, KS; I-80 at Elm Creek, NE
- North end: I-90 / I-90 BL at Presho, SD

Location
- Country: United States
- States: Texas, Oklahoma, Kansas, Nebraska, South Dakota

Highway system
- United States Numbered Highway System; List; Special; Divided

U.S. Route 183 (US 183) is a north–south United States highway. The highway's northern terminus is in Presho, South Dakota, at an intersection with Interstate 90. Its southern terminus is in Refugio, Texas, at the southern intersection of U.S. Highway 77 and Alternate US 77 (US 183 and Alt US 77 run concurrently for their final 80 miles (130 km) between Cuero and Refugio).

US 183 was the last U.S. Route to be completely paved. The 20-mile (32 km) segment in Loup County, Nebraska, north of Taylor, was unpaved until 1967.

== Route description ==
=== Texas ===
US-183 begins in Refugio, sharing a concurrency with US-77A. The two highways continue north through Goliad County until they split in DeWitt County. US-183 crosses I-10 south of the town of Luling.

The largest city that US-183 passes through is Austin, Texas, where it is mostly a limited access highway. Northwest of Austin, US-183 passes through the suburbs of Cedar Park and Leander, where the 183A toll road runs parallel to it. In Lampasas County, US-183 overlaps US-190 between the towns of Lampasas and Lometa.

US-183 overlaps US-84 from Goldthwaite in Mills County to Early in Brown County. It crosses I-20 in Cisco, Texas. US-183 overlaps US-283 in Throckmorton County, and both highways overlaps US-277 and US-82 in Baylor County from Seymour to Mabelle. In Wilbarger County, US-183 exits the concurrency with US-283 and turns east with US-70 to overlap US-287 between the towns of Vernon and Oklaunion. US-183 continues north overlapping US-70 until it leaves the state of Texas.

=== Oklahoma ===
US 183/US 70 enters Oklahoma by crossing the Red River 3 miles (4.8 km) south of Davidson, OK. In Davidson, US 70 splits from US 183, leaving US 183 on its own. This continues as US 183 passes US 62 and BUS 62 in Snyder, OK. About 62 miles (100 km) north of Snyder, US 183 crosses Interstate 40 at Interstate 40's exit 66. Another 47 miles (76 km) later, US 183 co-signs with US 270 near Seiling, OK. US 183/US 270 continue in a northwesterly direction for 32 miles (51 km) before picking up US 412 in Woodward, OK. US 183/US 270/US 412 then leave Woodward in a due west fashion for a short time, until heading northwest again for 15 miles (24 km), at which time US 270 and US 412 leave US 183 near Fort Supply, OK to form their own duplex through the panhandle of Oklahoma as US 270/US 412. US 183 then continues north from the southern Harper County line to the Oklahoma/Kansas state line for a total of about 31 miles (50 km) before leaving the state.

=== Kansas ===
US-183 enters Kansas in Clark County and turns east at Sitka, where it begins a concurrency with US-160, entering Comanche County, where it passes through Protection. The highways stay paired as it turns north to pass through the Comanche County seat, Coldwater. At Coldwater, US-160 turns back to the east, and US-183 continues its northerly track.

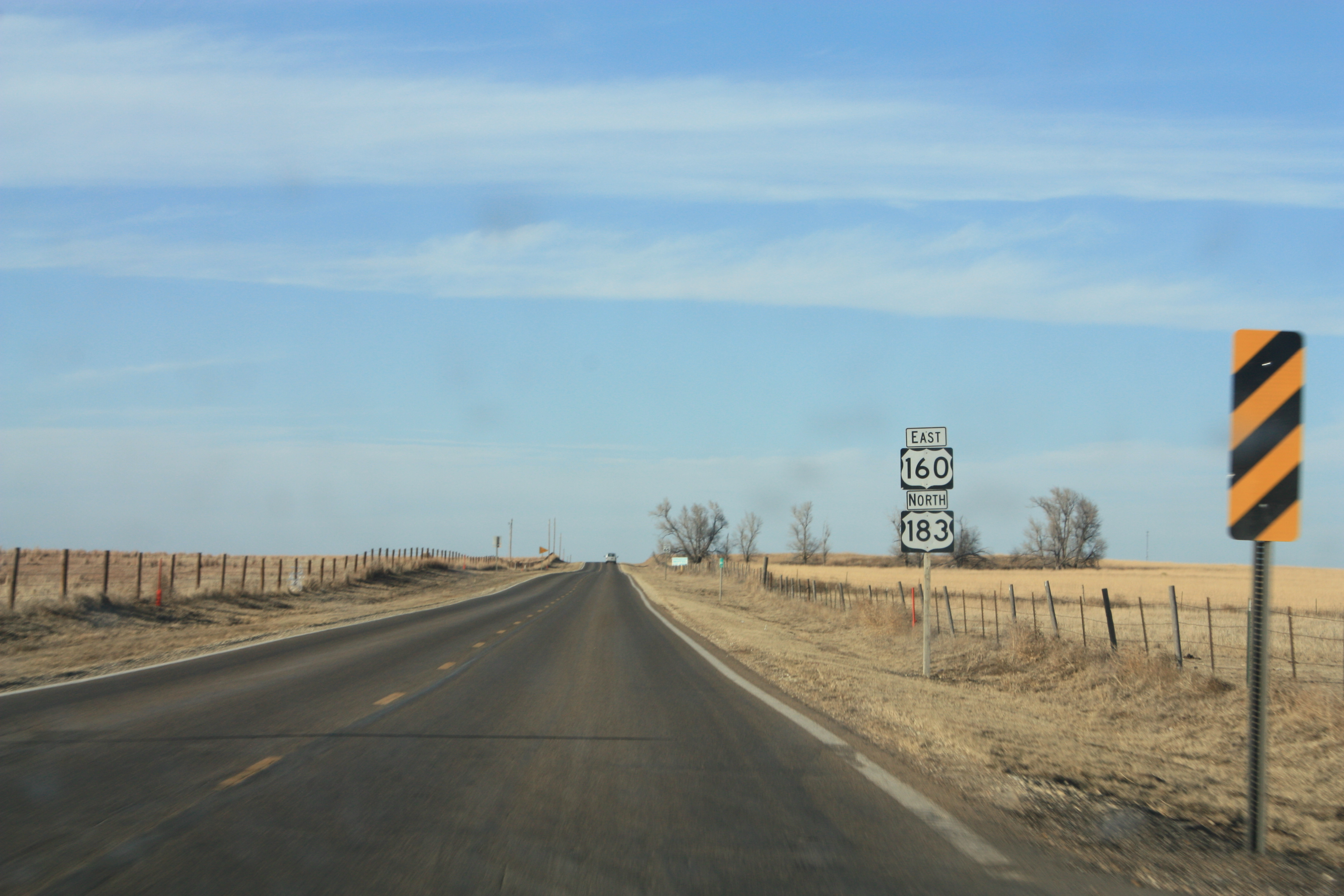
US-183 running concurrently with US-160 in southern Comanche County.

Entering Kiowa County, US-183 reaches a junction with the overlapped east–west route, US-54 and US-400, where it passes through Greensburg. In southern Edwards County, the highway makes a brief turn to the west before meeting up with US-56 in Kinsley, the Edwards County seat. US-56 and US-183 turn northeast before the highways split after entering Pawnee County. US-56 continues northeast toward Larned, and US-183 straightens out to pass through largely unpopulated areas in Edwards County.

In Rush County, US-183 intersects two primary east–west Kansas state highways, K-96 in Rush Center and K-4 in LaCrosse.

US-183 reaches the largest city along its route in Kansas, Hays, where a western bypass of the highway provides direct access to Gross Memorial Coliseum and Fort Hays State University. US-183 is known as Vine Street in Hays and contains numerous businesses. US-183 runs through town for three miles (5 km) before crossing Interstate 70, which is heavily traveled in Hays with traffic between Denver and Kansas City. The interchange of US-183 and I-70 has been designated as the CW2 Bryan J. Nichols Fallen Veterans Memorial Interchange.

North of Hays, the highway has been resurfaced and realigned for 23 miles (37 km) to Plainville, one of two towns in Rooks County US-183 serves. At Plainville, US-183 has a junction with K-18. US-183 continues 15 miles (24 km) north to Stockton, the Rooks County seat, where US-24 crosses.

The highway enters Phillips County approximately 12 miles (19 km) north of Stockton. US-183 meets US-36 west, and the highways join for a concurrency through the city of Phillipsburg. The highways split in downtown Phillipsburg, and US-183 has one last junction with K-383 before exiting the state south of Alma, Nebraska.

US-183 is two-laned throughout Kansas, except for the portion which runs through Hays.

=== Nebraska ===
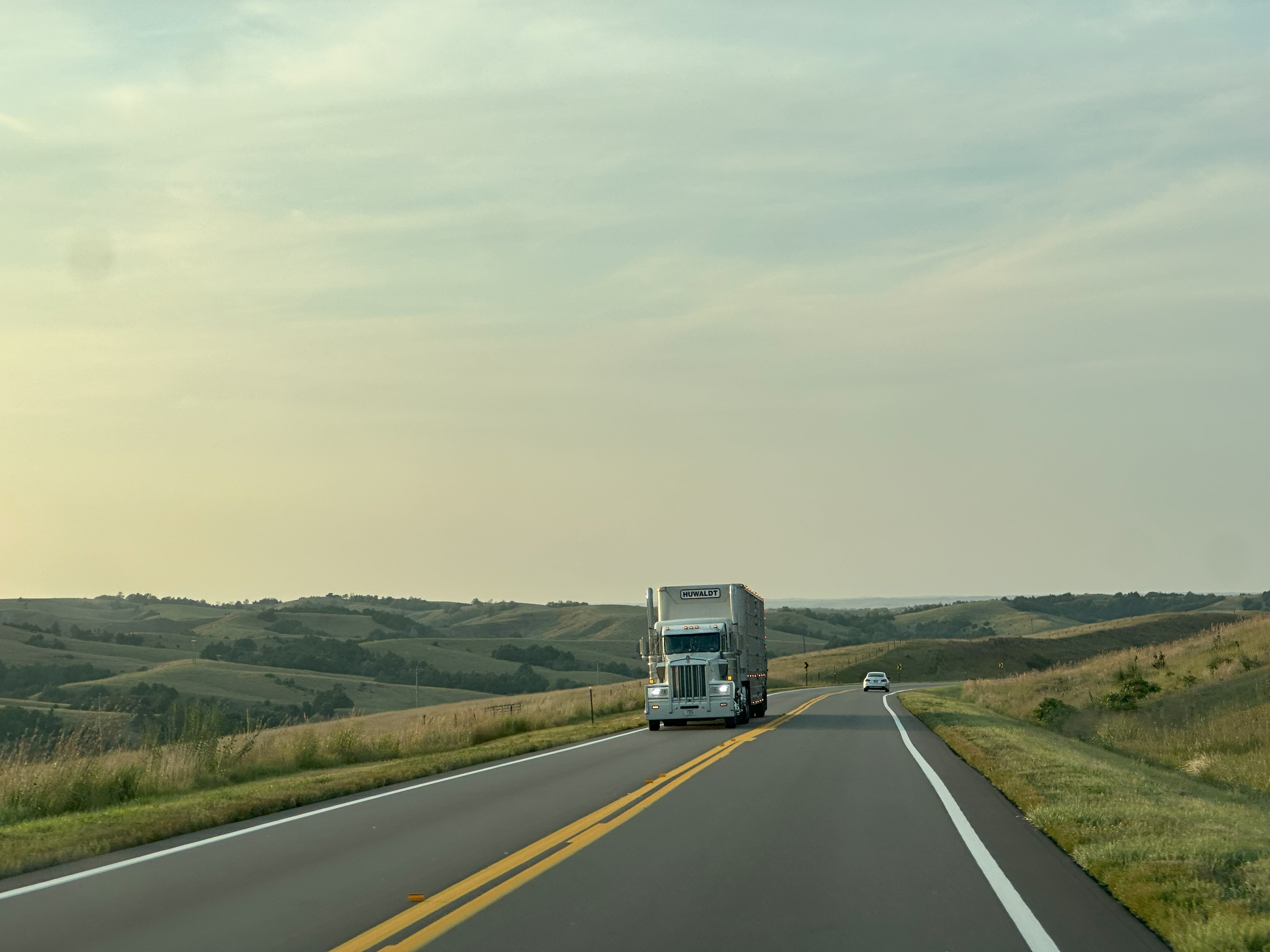
US 183 between Sargent and Taylor, Nebraska.

U.S. Highway 183 enters Nebraska south of Alma. It enters Alma after crossing Harlan County Lake and the Republican River and then runs concurrent with U.S. Highway 136 north out of Alma. After separating from US 136, US 183 continues north to Holdrege, where it intersects U.S. Highway 6 and U.S. Highway 34. US 183 continues north from Holdrege and intersects Interstate 80 south of Elm Creek shortly after crossing the Platte River. It then proceeds north into Elm Creek and meets U.S. Highway 30. US 183 continues north through Miller and intersects Nebraska Highway 2 at Ansley. It continues north from Ansley through Sargent, Taylor, and Rose before it intersects U.S. Highway 20 in Bassett. US 183 continues north through Springview before entering South Dakota.

=== South Dakota ===
U.S. Highway 183 enters South Dakota just south of Wewela. It goes north to Colome, where it intersects U.S. Route 18. US 183 and US 18 pass concurrently northwest through Winner, then US 183 turns north, west of Winner. Route 183 goes north to Presho, where it intersects Interstate 90 and ends.

Legally, the South Dakota section of U.S. 183, with the exception of a concurrency with U.S. 18, is defined at South Dakota Codified Laws § 31-4-202.

== History ==
When the route was first commissioned in 1930, it traveled from near Selden, Kansas to North Platte, Nebraska. This route is now part of US 83.

From 1932 until I-90 was built in the 1960s, US 183's northern terminus was 10 miles (16 km) further west, in Vivian, South Dakota at an intersection with its parent, US 83. In 1940, the southern terminus was extended south to Junction, Texas. It was extended to its present endpoint in 1951. In 1952, it was rerouted between Throckmorton and Cisco, Texas, replacing part of SH 6 and SH 187.

In 1967 an approximately 20 miles (32 km) section in Loup County, Nebraska, near Taylor, was paved making the US 183 the last US Route to become fully paved.

An approximately 9 miles (14 km) section of road was built to connect the US 183 with the US 183A Toll Road, with work starting in 2022. This connected central Austin with Liberty Hill and Cedar Park. In January 2026 the northbound section was opened, followed by the southbound section in March the same year. Construction started in 2025 on 2 new non-tolled roads either side of the US 183A Toll Road. These run between RM 1431 and Avery Ranch Boulevard, around 20 miles (32 km) north of Austin, and are expected to be finished by 2029.

== Major intersections ==
Texas
Future I-69E / US 77 in Refugio
Future I-69W / US 59 in Goliad
US 87 southwest of Cuero. The highways travel concurrently to Cuero.
I-10 in Luling
US 90 in Luling. The highways travel concurrently through Luling.
US 290 in Austin
I-35 in Austin
US 190 in Lampasas. The highways travel concurrently to south of Lometa.
US 281 in Lampasas. The highways travel concurrently through Lampasas.
US 84 north of Goldthwaite. The highways travel concurrently to Early.
US 67 / US 377 in Early. The highways travel concurrently through Early.
I-20 in Cisco
US 180 in Breckenridge
US 283 south of Throckmorton. The highways travel concurrently to Vernon.
US 380 in Throckmorton
US 277 south-southwest of Seymour. The highways travel concurrently to Mabelle.
US 82 north-northeast of Seymour. The highways travel concurrently to Mabelle.
US 70 / US 287 in Vernon. US 70/US 183 travels concurrently to Davidson, Oklahoma. US 183/US 287 travels concurrently to Oklaunion.
Oklahoma
US 62 south-southwest of Snyder
I-40 in Clinton
US 60 west-southwest of Seiling
US 270 northwest of Seiling. The highways travel concurrently to west-northwest of Fort Supply.
US 412 in Woodward. The highways travel concurrently to west-northwest of Fort Supply.
US 64 in Buffalo. The highways travel concurrently to north-northeast of Buffalo.
Kansas
US 160 north-northwest of Sitka. The highways travel concurrently to north of Coldwater.
US 54 / US 400 west of Greensburg
US 50 in Kinsley
US 56 in Kinsley. The highways travel concurrently to north-northwest of Lewis.
I-70 / US 40 in Hays
US 24 in Stockton
US 36 in Phillipsburg. The highways travel concurrently through Phillipsburg.
Nebraska
US 136 in Alma. The highways travel concurrently to north-northwest of Alma.
US 6 / US 34 in Holdrege
I-80 south of Elm Creek
US 30 in Elm Creek
US 20 in Bassett
South Dakota
US 18 in Colome. The highways travel concurrently to southeast of Witten.
I-90 southeast of Presho

== See also ==
=== Related routes ===
- U.S. Route 83
- U.S. Route 283
- U.S. Route 383

Browse numbered routes
← SH 182	TX	→ SH 183
← US 177	OK	→ SH-199
← K-182	KS	→ K-184
← I-180	NE	→ N-250
← SD 168	SD	→ I-190
