= Manthey Barn =

- U.S. National Register of Historic Places
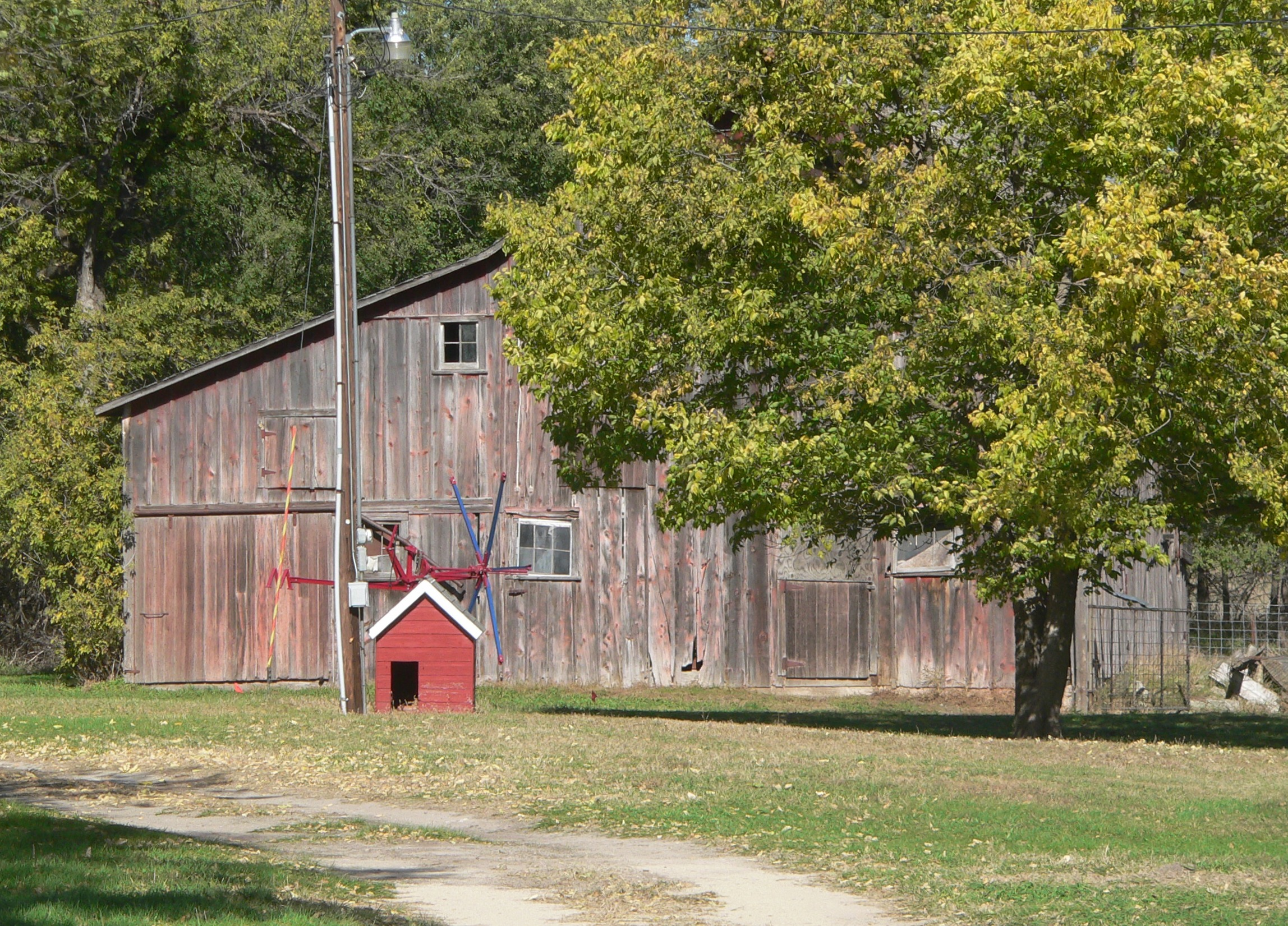

- Location within South Dakota Location within the United States
- Location: 31952 289th St., near Colome, South Dakota
- Coordinates: 43°12′48″N 99°46′51″W
- Area: less than one acre
- Built: 1916
- Built by: George Manthey
- Architectural style: Midwest Three-Portal
- NRHP reference No.: 03001533
- Added to NRHP: January 28, 2004

The Manthey Barn, in rural Tripp County, South Dakota near Colome, South Dakota, was built in 1916 by George Manthey. It was listed on the National Register of Historic Places in 2004.

It is a "Midwest Three-Portal" dairy barn. It has a timber frame built with hand-hewn lumber and uses mortise-and-tenon joinery. Its first floor has mangers on both sides of a narrow central aisle, a milking area, stanchions, and storage areas. A hayloft is on the second floor.

It is located at 31952 289th St.

== Gallery ==
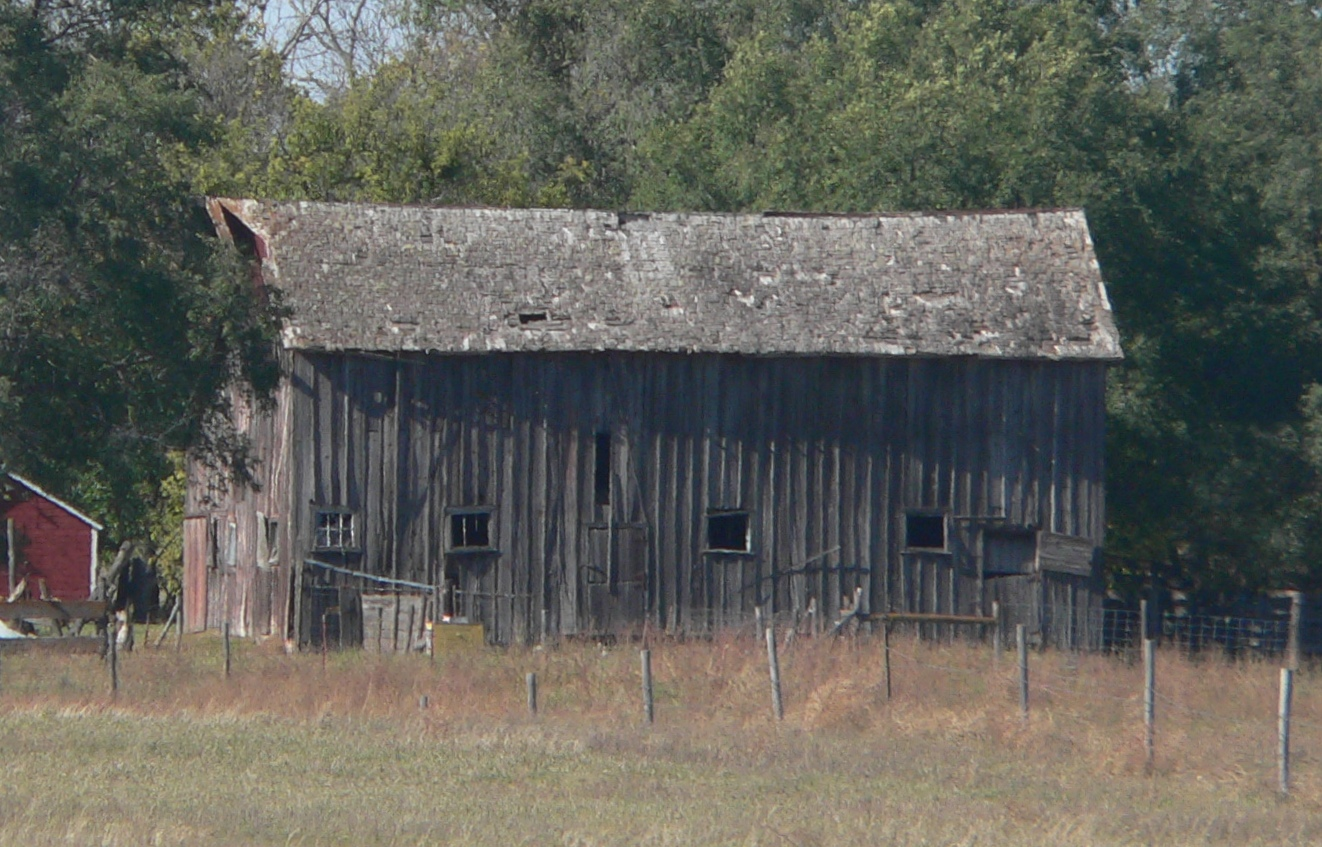

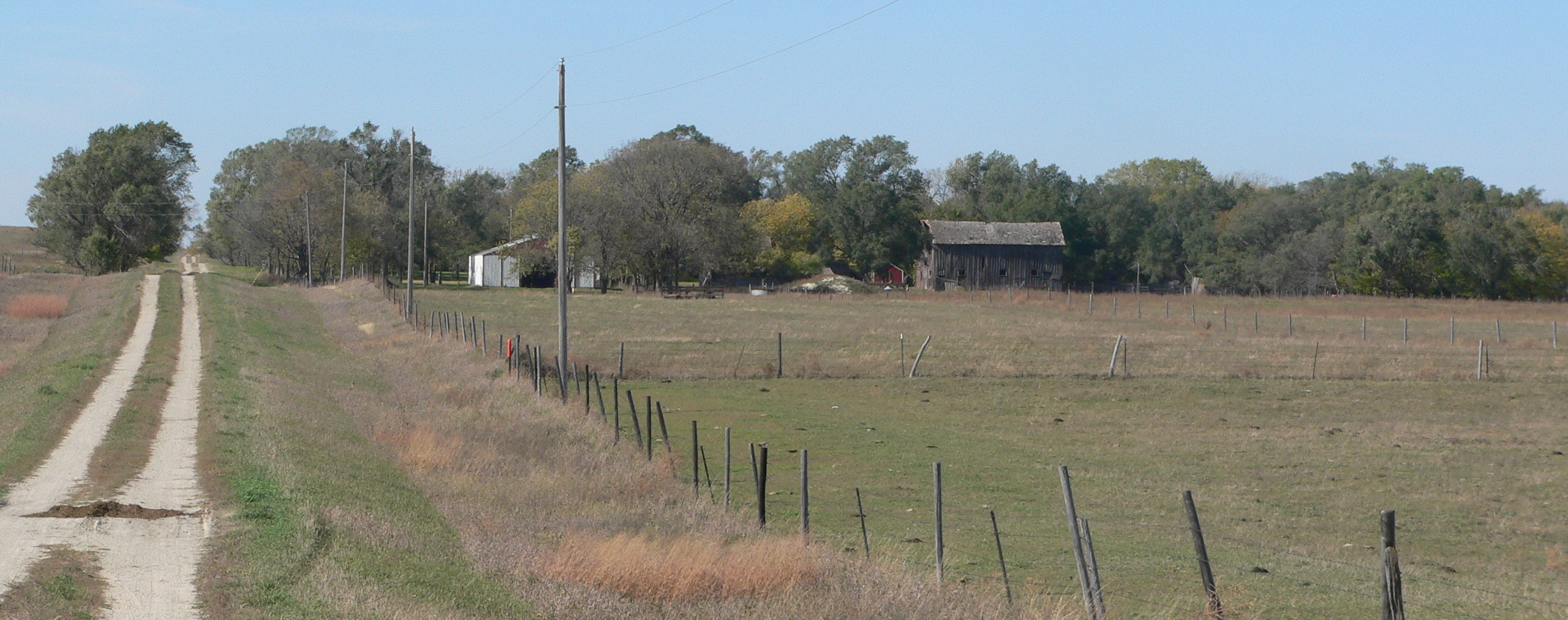
