= Kay Jorgensen (politician) =

American politician

Member of the South Dakota House of Representatives from the 31st district
- In office January 12, 1993 – January 12, 1999
- Succeeded by: Mark Young

Member of the South Dakota House of Representatives from the 26th district
- In office January 9, 1979 – January 8, 1985

Personal details
- Born: March 25, 1951 (age 75) Winner, South Dakota
- Party: Republican

Kay Jorgensen (born March 25, 1951) is an American politician who served in the South Dakota House of Representatives from 1979 to 1985 and from 1993 to 1999.
