= Millsboro =

Millsboro or Millboro may refer to:

- Millsboro, Delaware
- Millsboro, Pennsylvania
- Millboro, South Dakota
- Millboro, Virginia
- Millsboro, West Virginia
