= Winner Regional Airport =

Coordinates: 43°23′25″N 099°50′32″W

Winner Regional Airport Bob Wiley Field
- IATA: none; ICAO: KICR; FAA LID: ICR

Summary
- Airport type: Public
- Owner: City of Winner
- Serves: Winner, South Dakota
- Elevation AMSL: 2,032 ft / 619 m
- Interactive map of Winner Regional Airport

Runways
Direction	Length		Surface
Direction	ft	m	Surface
13/31	4,500	1,372	Concrete
3/21	2,900	884	Turf

Statistics (2007)
- Aircraft operations: 19,800
- Source: Federal Aviation Administration

Winner Regional Airport (ICAO: KICR, FAA LID: ICR), also known as Bob Wiley Field, is a public airport located one mile (2 km) northeast of the central business district of Winner, a city in Tripp County, South Dakota, United States. The airport is owned by the City of Winner. The airport's FAA location identifier, formerly SFD, was changed on July 5, 2007.

== Facilities and aircraft ==
Winner Regional Airport covers an area of 226 acres (91 ha) which contains two runways: 13/31 which has a concrete pavement measuring 4,500 x 75 ft (1,372 x 23 m) and 3/21 with a turf surface measuring 2,900 x 150 ft (884 x 46 m). For the 12-month period ending June 13, 2007, the airport had 19,800 aircraft operations, an average of 54 per day: 98% general aviation and 2% air taxi.

== See also ==
- List of airports in South Dakota
