= Keyapaha, South Dakota =

- Unincorporated community
- Location within South Dakota
- Coordinates: 43°06′34″N 100°08′16″W
- Country: United States
- State: South Dakota
- County: Tripp
- Elevation: 2,300 ft (700 m)
- Time zone: UTC-6 (Central (CST))
  - Summer (DST): UTC-5 (CDT)
- Area code: 605
- GNIS feature ID: 1261116

Keyapaha is an unincorporated community in Tripp County, South Dakota, United States. Keyapaha is southwest of Colome and south of New Witten.

The community took its name from the Keya Paha River. The name "Keya Paha" is taken from the Sioux language; literally translated, it means "turtle hill".
