= Lone Star Township =

Lone Star Township may refer to:

- Lone Star Township, Rush County, Kansas
- Lone Star Township, Tripp County, South Dakota
