= Carter, South Dakota =

- Unincorporated community
- Location within South Dakota
- Coordinates: 43°23′14″N 100°12′09″W
- Country: United States
- State: South Dakota
- County: Tripp
- Elevation: 2,172 ft (662 m)
- Time zone: UTC-6 (Central (CST))
  - Summer (DST): UTC-5 (CDT)
- Area code: 605
- GNIS feature ID: 1254257

Carter is an unincorporated community in Tripp County, South Dakota, United States. Carter is located on U.S. Route 18, west of Winner.

Carter was laid out in 1909, and most likely was named in honor of Jervis W. Carter, a land agent.
