= Ideal, South Dakota =

Ideal
- Unincorporated community
- Location within the state of South Dakota Ideal (the United States)
- Coordinates: 43°32′24″N 99°55′18″W
- Country: United States
- State: South Dakota
- County: Tripp

Area
  - Total: 0.51 sq mi (1.33 km^{2})
  - Land: 0.51 sq mi (1.33 km^{2})
  - Water: 0 sq mi (0.00 km^{2})
- Elevation: 1,887 ft (575 m)

Population (2020)
  - Total: 86
  - Density: 167.2/sq mi (64.57/km^{2})
- Time zone: UTC-6 (Central (CST))
  - Summer (DST): UTC-5 (CDT)
- ZIP codes: 57541
- Area code: 605
- FIPS code: 46-31220
- GNIS feature ID: 2813065

Ideal is an unincorporated community in northern Tripp County, South Dakota, United States. It lies north of the city of Winner, the county seat. Its elevation is 1,886 feet (575 m). The population of the CDP was 86 at the 2020 census.

Ideal's town site was considered to be "ideal" for farming, hence the name.

== Education ==
The community is served by Winner School District 59-2.

== Demographics ==
Historical population
Census	Pop.	Note	%±
2020	86		—
U.S. Decennial Census
