= Tripp County Veteran's Memorial =

- U.S. National Register of Historic Places
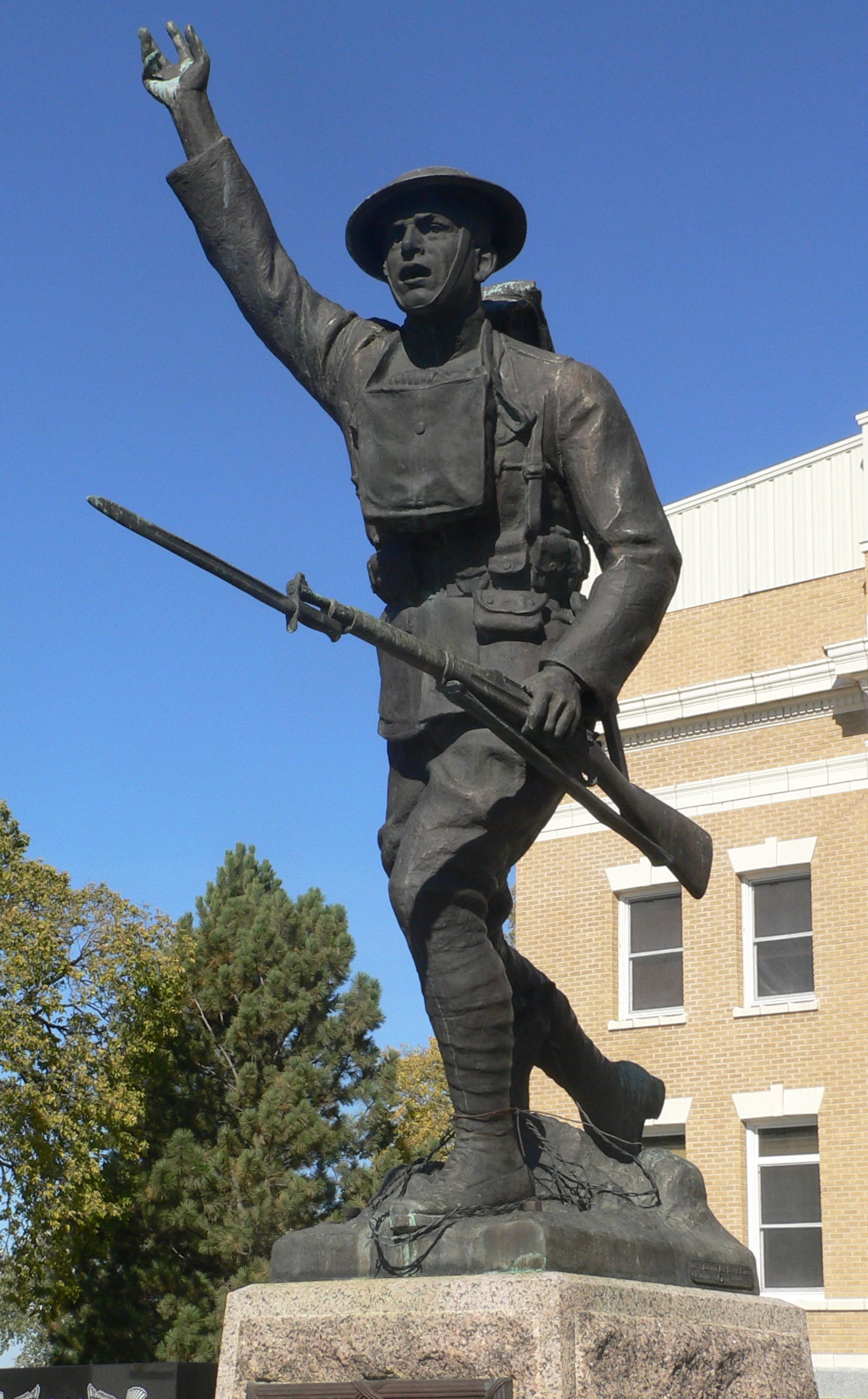

- Location within South Dakota
- Location: 200 E. Third St., Winner, South Dakota
- Coordinates: 43°22′33″N 99°51′17″W
- Area: less than one acre
- Built: 1924
- Sculptor: Paulding, John
- NRHP reference No.: 09000947
- Added to NRHP: November 17, 2009

Tripp County Veteran's Memorial, at 200 E. Third St. in Winner, South Dakota, was erected in 1924. It was listed on the National Register of Historic Places in 2009.

It is a bronze sculpture by artist John Paulding, about 90 by 30 by 70 inches (229 cm × 76 cm × 178 cm) in dimension, on a base which is about 70 by 34 by 34 inches (178 cm × 86 cm × 86 cm) in dimension. It is located on the south side of the Tripp County Courthouse.

The bronze represents a World War I doughboy carrying a rifle and with a raised arm, as if leading in a charge.

== Gallery ==
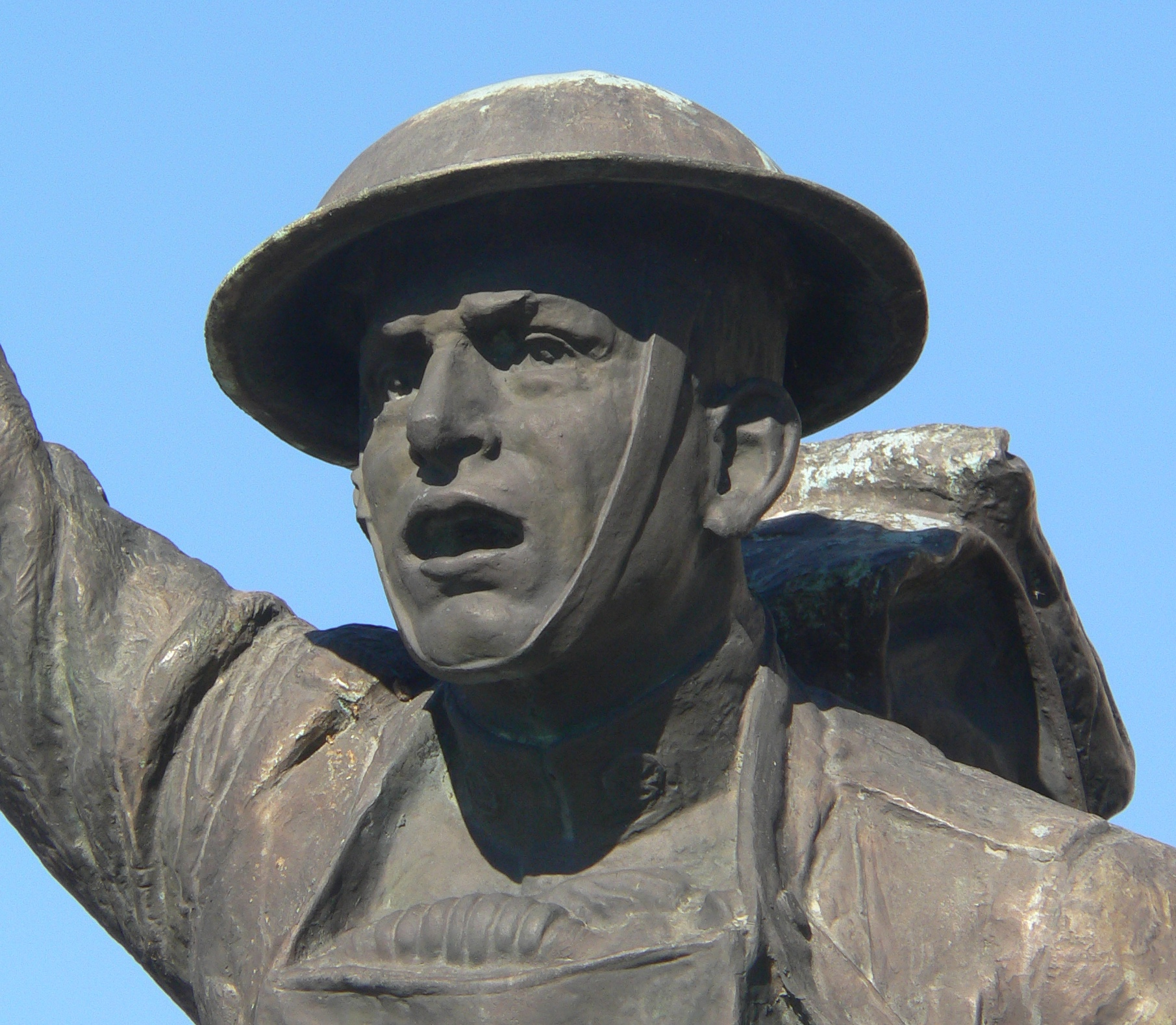

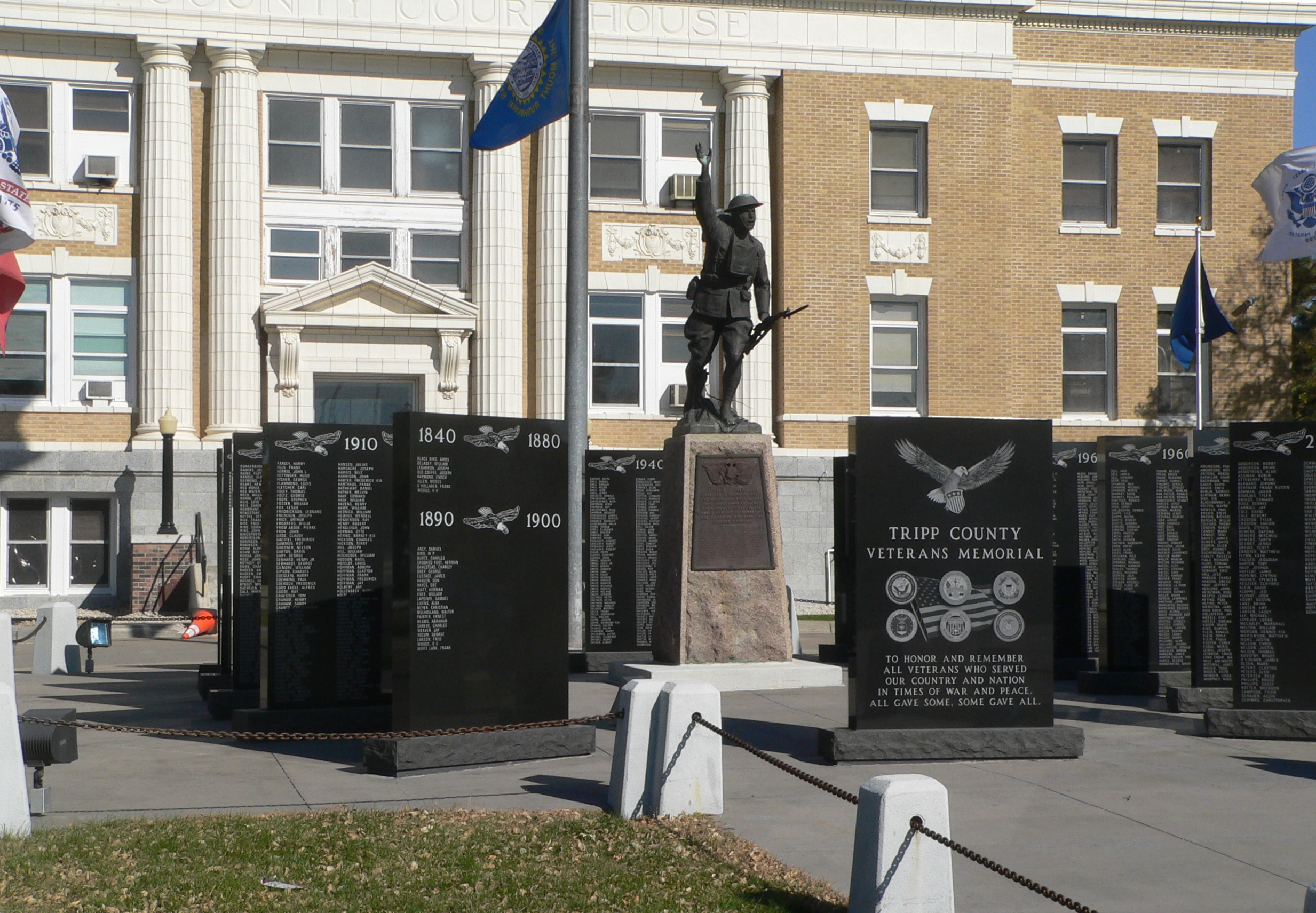
