= Clearfield, South Dakota =

- Unincorporated community
- Location within South Dakota
- Coordinates: 43°10′06″N 100°01′41″W
- Country: United States
- State: South Dakota
- County: Tripp
- Elevation: 2,274 ft (693 m)
- Time zone: UTC-6 (Central (CST))
  - Summer (DST): UTC-5 (CDT)
- Area code: 605
- GNIS feature ID: 1260989

Clearfield is an unincorporated community in Tripp County, South Dakota, United States. Clearfield is southwest of Colome.

== History ==
Clearfield was founded by settlers from Clearfield, Iowa in 1910.
