= Millboro, South Dakota =

- Unincorporated community
- Location within South Dakota
- Coordinates: 43°04′23″N 99°58′08″W
- Country: United States
- State: South Dakota
- County: Tripp
- Founded: 1909
- Elevation: 2,218 ft (676 m)
- Time zone: UTC-6 (Central (CST))
  - Summer (DST): UTC-5 (CDT)
- Area code: 605
- GNIS feature ID: 1256469

Millboro is an unincorporated community in Tripp County, South Dakota, United States. Millboro is southwest of Colome.

Millboro was named for a planned gristmill near the town site.

== History ==
The town was founded in 1909.
