= Wewela Hall =

- U.S. National Register of Historic Places
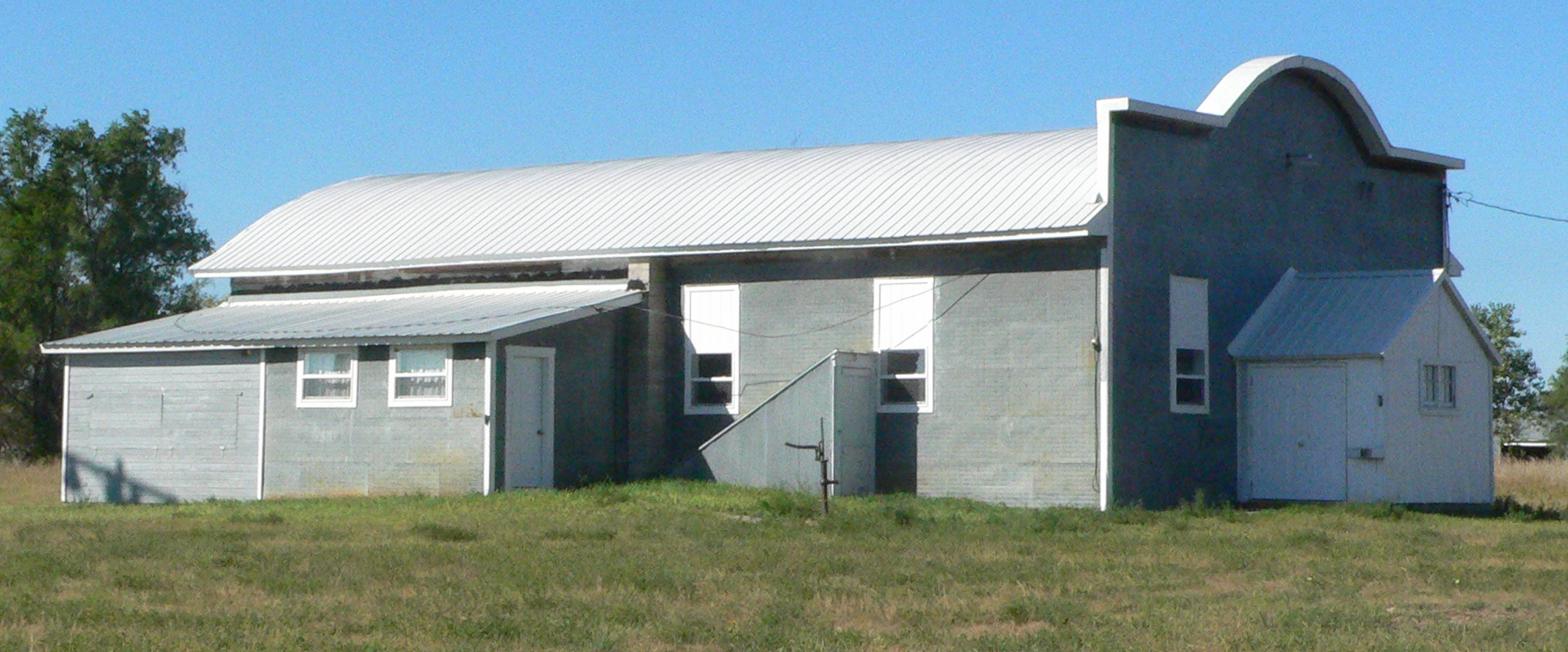

- Location within South Dakota
- Location: Lots 3 and 4, Block 34, Government Townsite of Wewela, Wewela, South Dakota
- Coordinates: 43°00′46″N 99°47′03″W
- Area: 1 acre (0.40 ha)
- Built: 1926
- Architectural style: Late 19th and Early 20th Century American Movements
- NRHP reference No.: 10000952
- Added to NRHP: November 29, 2010

Wewela Hall, in Wewela, South Dakota, was built in 1926. It was listed on the National Register of Historic Places in 2010.

It was built by the community in 1926.

It has also been known as the Wewela Community Club Hall.
