= Hidden Timber, South Dakota =

Unincorporated community in South Dakota, U.S.

Coordinates: 43°13′46″N 100°25′17″W

Hidden Timber is an unincorporated community in Todd County, in the U.S. state of South Dakota.

== History ==
A post office called Hidden Timber was established in 1926, and remained in operation until 1962. The community was named for a secluded tract of forest near the original town site.
