= Elm Creek, Nebraska =

Village in Nebraska, US

- Village
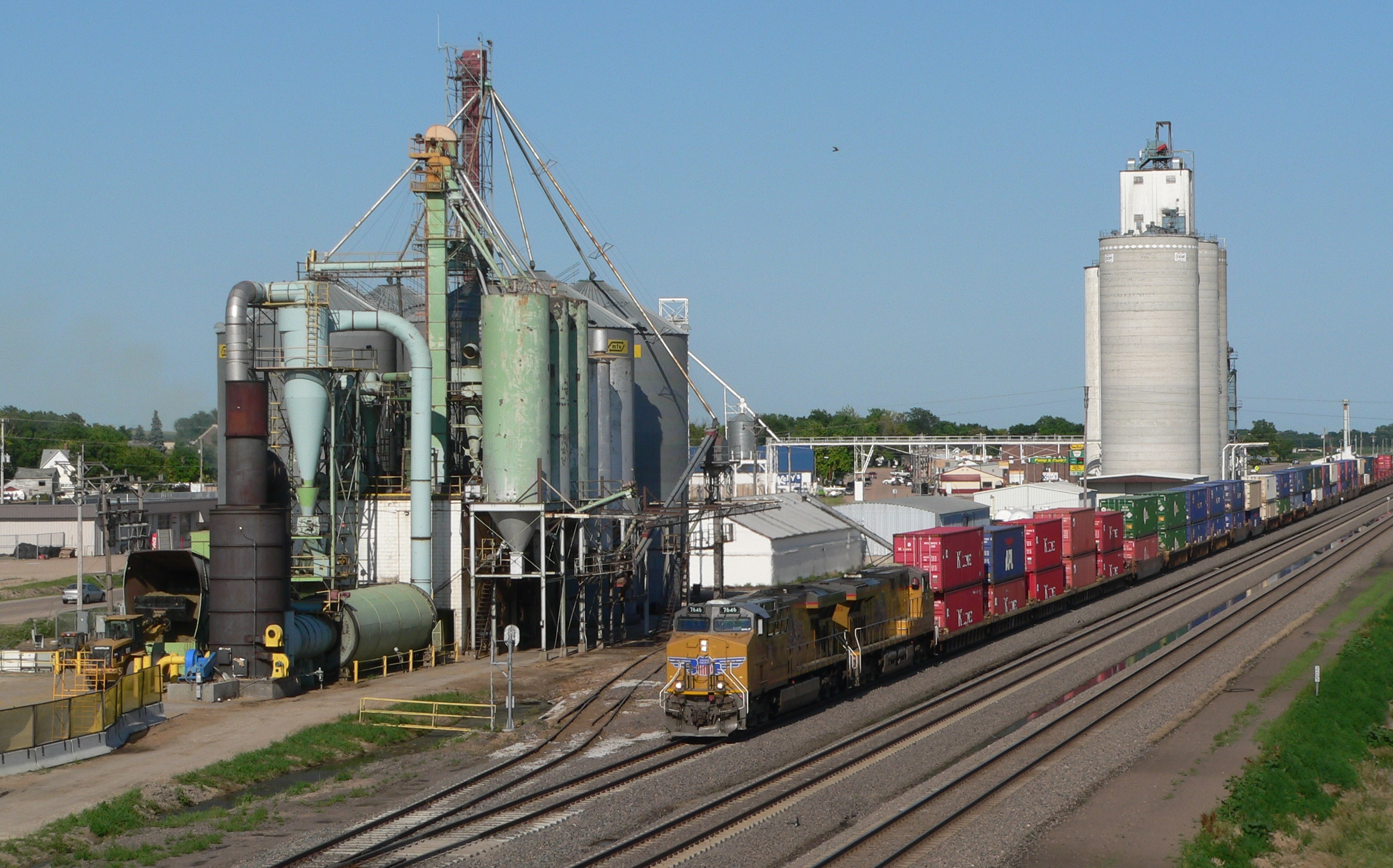
- The Union Pacific Railroad's main line runs through Elm Creek.

- Location of Elm Creek, Nebraska
- Coordinates: 40°43′09″N 99°22′14″W
- Country: United States
- State: Nebraska
- County: Buffalo

Area
  - Total: 0.69 sq mi (1.80 km^{2})
  - Land: 0.69 sq mi (1.80 km^{2})
  - Water: 0 sq mi (0.00 km^{2})
- Elevation: 2,270 ft (690 m)

Population (2020)
  - Total: 979
  - Density: 1,407.8/sq mi (543.54/km^{2})
- Time zone: UTC-6 (Central (CST))
  - Summer (DST): UTC-5 (CDT)
- ZIP code: 68836
- Area code: 308
- FIPS code: 31-15360
- GNIS feature ID: 2398813

Elm Creek is a village in Buffalo County, Nebraska, United States. It is part of the Kearney, Nebraska Micropolitan Statistical Area. The population was 979 at the 2020 census.

== History ==
Elm Creek was founded in 1866 with the arrival of the Union Pacific Railroad to Buffalo County. Prior the construction of a railway station in Elm Creek, the area was heavily timbered with ash, elm, and cottonwood trees but they were almost all removed for use in building the railroad. The village was incorporated in 1887. The construction spurred the development of the wood-frame business, but much of it was destroyed in a fire in 1906; stone was used afterwards to rebuild. A contest for renaming the settlement, in hopes that the new name would bring prosperity, was held in 1912, but the prize was never awarded and the name remained unchanged.

== Geography ==
According to the United States Census Bureau, the village has a total area of 0.70 square miles (1.81 km^{2}), all land.

== Demographics ==
Historical population
Census	Pop.	Note	%±
1890	357		—
1900	301		−15.7%
1910	620		106.0%
1920	600		−3.2%
1930	708		18.0%
1940	730		3.1%
1950	799		9.5%
1960	778		−2.6%
1970	798		2.6%
1980	862		8.0%
1990	852		−1.2%
2000	894		4.9%
2010	901		0.8%
2020	979		8.7%
U.S. Decennial Census

=== 2010 census ===
As of the census of 2010, there were 901 people, 373 households, and 243 families living in the village. The population density was 1,287.1 inhabitants per square mile (497.0/km^{2}). There were 409 housing units at an average density of 584.3 per square mile (225.6/km^{2}). The racial makeup of the village was 98.9% White, 0.1% Native American, 0.3% from other races, and 0.7% from two or more races. Hispanic or Latino people of any race were 4.1% of the population.

There were 373 households, of which 34.6% had children under the age of 18 living with them, 48.3% were married couples living together, 9.7% had a female householder with no husband present, 7.2% had a male householder with no wife present, and 34.9% were non-families. 29.2% of all households were made up of individuals, and 13.2% had someone living alone who was 65 years of age or older. The average household size was 2.42 and the average family size was 2.94.

The median age in the village was 36.2 years. 27.3% of residents were under the age of 18; 7.4% were between the ages of 18 and 24; 26.2% were from 25 to 44; 25.7% were from 45 to 64; and 13.4% were 65 years of age or older. The gender makeup of the village was 48.5% male and 51.5% female.

Elm Creek is a city located in Nebraska. With a 2020 population of 957, it is the 112th largest city in Nebraska and the 10495th largest city in the United States. Elm Creek is currently growing at a rate of 0.42% annually and its population has increased by 6.22% since the most recent census, which recorded a population of 901 in 2010. Elm Creek reached its highest population of 957 in 2021. Spanning over 1 mile, Elm Creek has a population density of 1,376 people per square mile. The average household income in Elm Creek is $67,415 with a poverty rate of 7.51%. The median rental costs in recent years comes to $888 per month, and the median house value is $114,800. The median age in Elm Creek is 30.3 years, 30.2 years for males, and 30.5 years for females. For every 100 females there are 101.8 males.

=== 2000 census ===
As of the census of 2000, there were 894 people, 363 households, and 231 families living in the village. The population density was 1,290.6 inhabitants per square mile (498.3/km^{2}). There were 387 housing units at an average density of 558.7 per square mile (215.7/km^{2}). The racial makeup of the village was 97.54% White, 0.11% Native American, 1.45% from other races, and 0.89% from two or more races. Hispanic or Latino people of any race were 3.02% of the population.

There were 363 households, out of which 34.4% had children under the age of 18 living with them, 54.5% were married couples living together, 6.3% had a female householder with no husband present, and 36.1% were non-families. 32.2% of all households were made up of individuals, and 14.6% had someone living alone who was 65 years of age or older. The average household size was 2.46 and the average family size was 3.14.

The median age in Elm Creek was 34 years. The population distribution was: 30.1% under the age of 18, 6.4% from 18 to 24, 30.8% from 25 to 44, 20.9% from 45 to 64, and 11.9% aged 65 years or older. For every 100 females, there were 96.9 males. For every 100 females age 18 and over, there were 96.5 males.

As of 2000 the median income for a household in the village was $32,279, and the median income for a family was $40,417. Males had a median income of $27,500 versus $19,688 for females. The per capita income for the village was $17,339. About 7.0% of families and 6.6% of the population were below the poverty line, including 5.0% of those under age 18 and 4.3% of those age 65 or over.

=== Racial composition ===
According to the most recent ACS, the racial composition of Elm Creek was:

- White: 97.53% - 1,106
- Other race: 2.12% - 24
- Two or more races: 0.26% - 3
- Native American: 0.09% - 1
- Black or African American: 0.00%
- Asian: 0.00%
- Native Hawaiian or Pacific Islander: 0.00%

== Attractions ==
Buffalo Stampede Days are celebrated during the last weekend in August, with a parade held on the first day, followed by a variety of festivities, sporting events, and a street dance.

There is a park with a swimming pool and baseball fields.

Elm Creek was home to Chevyland USA Museum. Founded in 1973 by Monte Hollertz, the museum at one time offered the largest collection of original and restored Chevrolets and supplies, along with motorcycles, and other vehicles. Attendance dwindled over the years, and the museum closed in 2019. The collection was sold in 2021.
