= Wewela, South Dakota =

Wewela, South Dakota wiwíla
- Unincorporated community
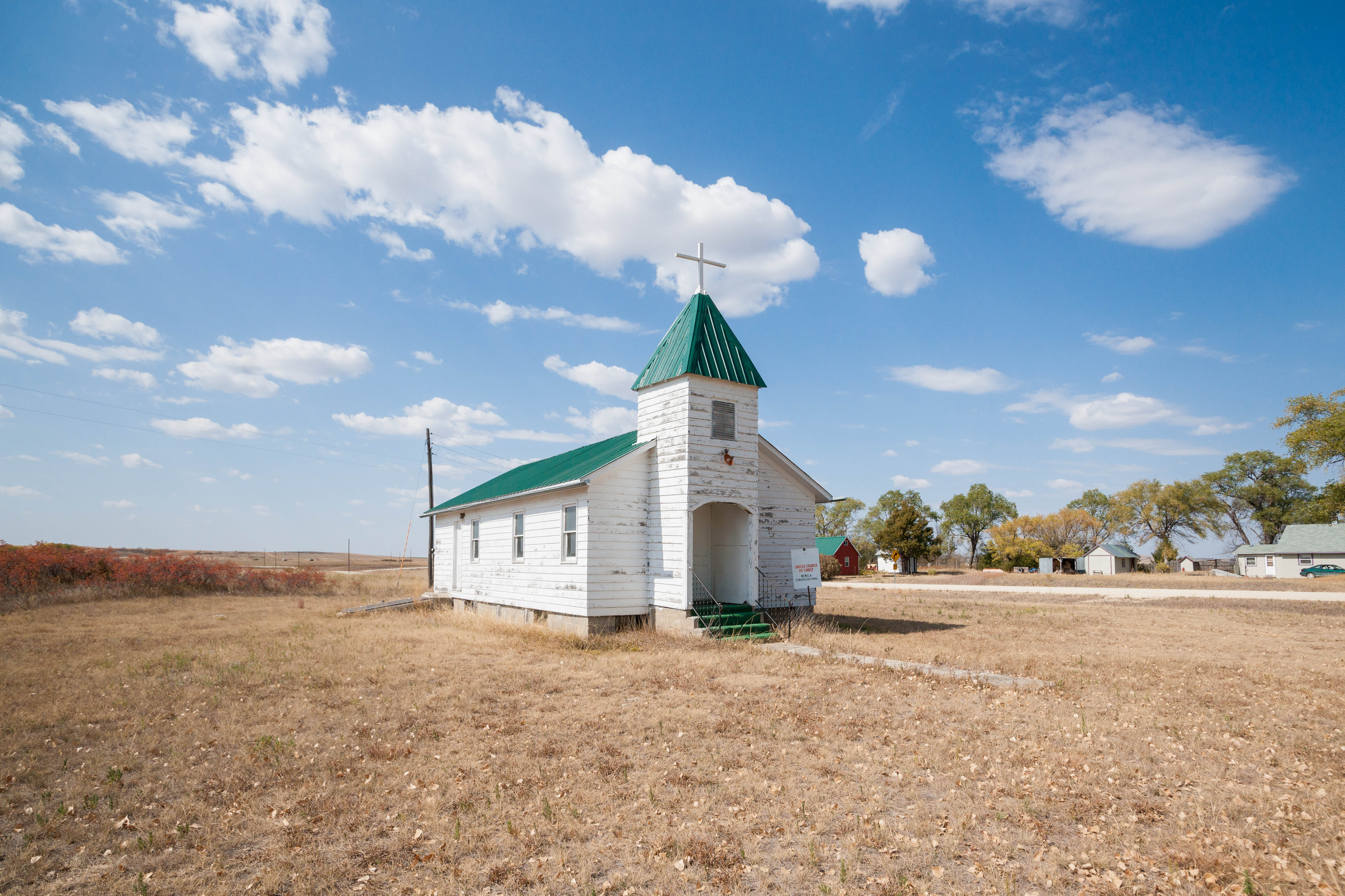
- United Church of Christ in Wewela, South Dakota

- Location within South Dakota Location within the United States
- Coordinates: 43°00′38″N 99°46′51″W
- Country: United States
- State: South Dakota
- County: Tripp
- Founded: April 1, 1909
- Elevation: 2,136 ft (651 m)

Population (2019)
  - Total: 5
- Time zone: UTC-6 (Central (CST))
  - Summer (DST): UTC-5 (CDT)
- ZIP code: 57578
- Area code: 605
- GNIS feature ID: 1258935

Wewela (Lakota: wiwíla; "A spring") is an unincorporated community in Tripp County, South Dakota, United States. Wewela is located on U.S. Route 183 near the Nebraska border, south of Colome.

The community most likely was named for springs near the original town site, Wewela meaning "small spring" in the Sioux language.

== History ==
The community was founded on April 1, 1909, alongside the town-sites of McNeely and Witten by the federal government.
