= New Witten, South Dakota =

- Town
- Location in Tripp County and the state of South Dakota
- Coordinates: 43°26′26″N 100°04′55″W
- Country: United States
- State: South Dakota
- County: Tripp
- Founded: April 1, 1909

Area
  - Total: 0.28 sq mi (0.72 km^{2})
  - Land: 0.28 sq mi (0.72 km^{2})
  - Water: 0 sq mi (0.00 km^{2})
- Elevation: 1,978 ft (603 m)

Population (2020)
  - Total: 54
  - Density: 195.3/sq mi (75.39/km^{2})
- Time zone: UTC-6 (Central (CST))
  - Summer (DST): UTC-5 (CDT)
- ZIP code: 57584
- Area code: 605
- FIPS code: 46-45100
- GNIS feature ID: 1267493

New Witten is a small town in Tripp County, South Dakota, United States. The population was 54 at the 2020 census.

"New Witten" is the name used by the United States Census Bureau to describe this town. However, the United States Post Office, which maintains an associate office in the town, uses the name "Witten".

Witten has the name of a government land official.

== History ==
The city was founded on April 1, 1909, alongside the town-sites of McNeely and Wewela by the federal government.

The town was originally located in a different place from where it stands today, however, around 1929, the railroad track missed the town by 2 miles, prompting a relocation of the town. The new town was simply called New Witten.

== Geography ==
According to the United States Census Bureau, the town has a total area of 0.28 square miles (0.73 km^{2}), all land.

== Demographics ==
Historical population
Census	Pop.	Note	%±
1940	211		—
1950	198		−6.2%
1960	146		−26.3%
1970	102		−30.1%
1980	134		31.4%
1990	87		−35.1%
2000	51		−41.4%
2010	79		54.9%
2020	54		−31.6%
U.S. Decennial Census

=== 2010 census ===
As of the census of 2010, there were 79 people, 35 households, and 22 families residing in the town. The population density was 282.1 inhabitants per square mile (108.9/km^{2}). There were 51 housing units at an average density of 182.1 per square mile (70.3/km^{2}). The racial makeup of the town was 97.5% White and 2.5% from two or more races.

There were 35 households, of which 22.9% had children under the age of 18 living with them, 51.4% were married couples living together, 5.7% had a female householder with no husband present, 5.7% had a male householder with no wife present, and 37.1% were non-families. 37.1% of all households were made up of individuals, and 14.3% had someone living alone who was 65 years of age or older. The average household size was 2.26 and the average family size was 2.91.

The median age in the town was 48.3 years. 24.1% of residents were under the age of 18; 5.1% were between the ages of 18 and 24; 18.9% were from 25 to 44; 33% were from 45 to 64; and 19% were 65 years of age or older. The gender makeup of the town was 50.6% male and 49.4% female.

=== 2000 census ===
As of the census of 2000, there were 51 people, 27 households, and 15 families residing in the town. The population density was 199.4 inhabitants per square mile (77.0/km^{2}). There were 37 housing units at an average density of 144.7 per square mile (55.9/km^{2}). The racial makeup of the town was 100.00% White.

There were 27 households, out of which 18.5% had children under the age of 18 living with them, 55.6% were married couples living together, and 44.4% were non-families. 40.7% of all households were made up of individuals, and 18.5% had someone living alone who was 65 years of age or older. The average household size was 1.89 and the average family size was 2.53.

In the town, the population was spread out, with 13.7% under the age of 18, 3.9% from 18 to 24, 25.5% from 25 to 44, 29.4% from 45 to 64, and 27.5% who were 65 years of age or older. The median age was 47 years. For every 100 females, there were 88.9 males. For every 100 females age 18 and over, there were 91.3 males.

The median income for a household in the town was $14,583, and the median income for a family was $26,250. Males had a median income of $23,125 versus $4,500 for females. The per capita income for the town was $9,664. There were no families and 20.5% of the population living below the poverty line, including no under eighteens and 15.4% of those over 64.
