= Keya Paha River =

River in Nebraska and South Dakota, U.S.

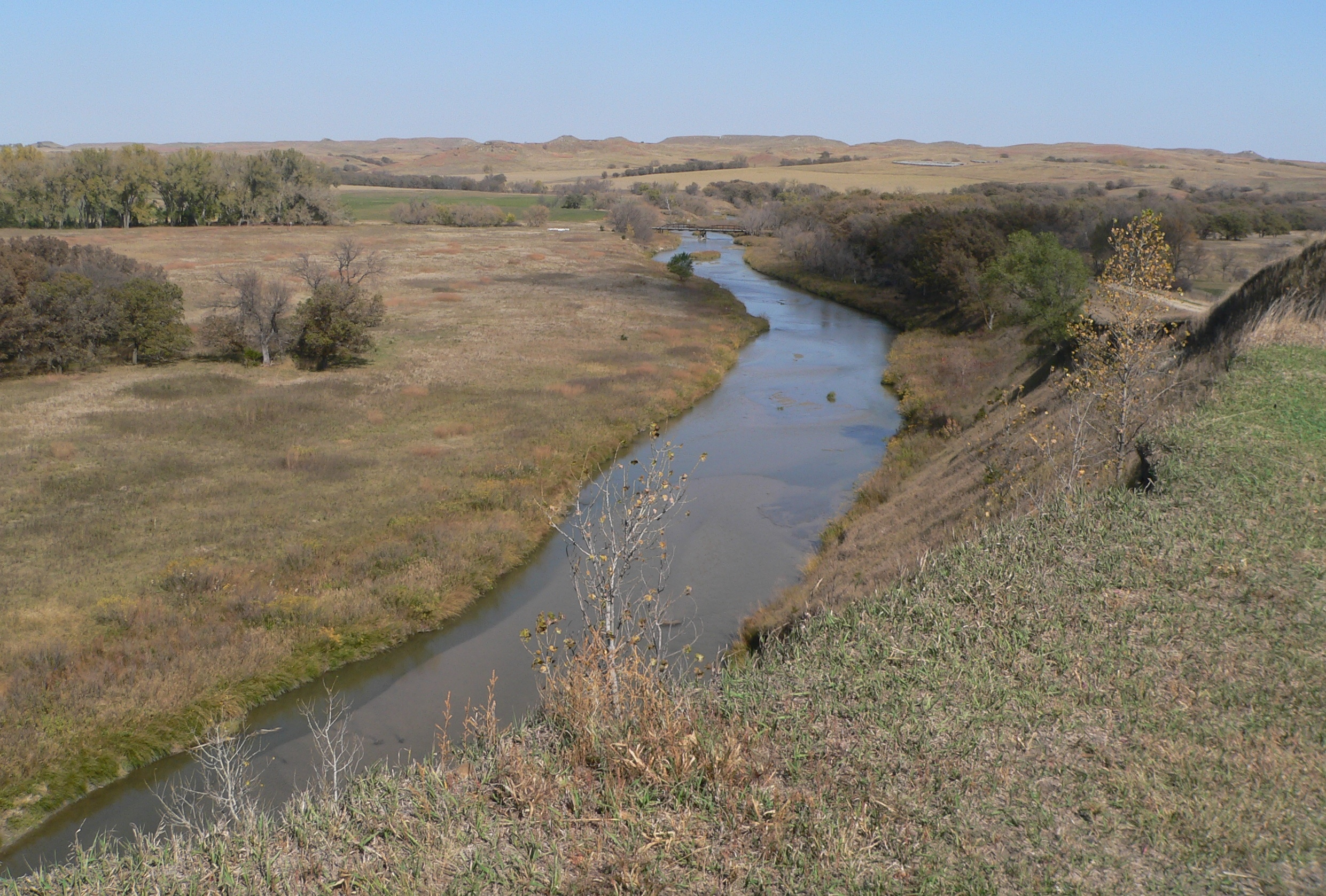
- Keya Paha River near Nebraska-South Dakota border

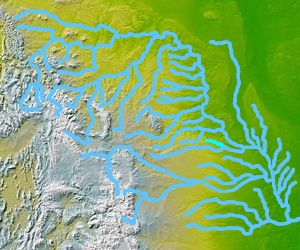
- Keya Paha River in light green at right center

Location
- Country: United States
- State: South Dakota, Nebraska

Physical characteristics
- Source: Todd County, South Dakota
  - coordinates: 43°13′38″N 100°23′18″W
- Mouth: Niobrara River in Boyd County, Nebraska
  - coordinates: 42°53′54″N 98°59′6″W
- Length: 127 mi (204 km)
- Basin size: 1,710 sq mi (4,400 km^{2})
- Discharge
  - location: near Naper
  - average: 139 cu/ft. per sec.

The Keya Paha River (/ˈkɪpəhɔː/ KIP-ə-haw) is a river flowing 127 miles (204 km) through the U.S. states of South Dakota and Nebraska.

The name is derived from the Dakota language ke'-ya pa-ha', meaning "turtle hill", specifically Turtle Butte. The river's name was given to Keya Paha County, Nebraska, through which it flows.

The river originates in Todd County in south central South Dakota, at the confluence of Antelope Creek and Rock Creek near the town of Hidden Timber. It flows in a generally southeasterly direction through Todd and Tripp counties in South Dakota and then through Keya Paha and Boyd counties in Nebraska. It ends at its confluence with the Niobrara River about 7 miles (11 km) west of Butte, Nebraska. The river has a year-round flow, except for winter ice, and has a quality of water better than all other South Dakota rivers.

In 1861, the border between the Nebraska and Dakota territories followed the Keya Paha River from the 43rd parallel to the river's confluence with the Niobrara; it then followed the Niobrara to Missouri. This situation lasted until 1882 when the boundary was changed to follow the 43rd parallel all the way to Missouri; the change added portions of Keya Paha and Boyd counties to Nebraska.

== Discharge ==
At a gaging station south of Naper in Boyd County, the river's mean discharge was 138.6 cubic feet per second (3.92 m^{3}/s). The maximum mean annual discharge was 389.4 cubic feet per second (11.03 m^{3}/s), recorded in 1962; the minimum mean annual discharge was 44.5 cubic feet per second (1.26 m^{3}/s), recorded in 1976. The peak flow recorded at that point was 9,280 cubic feet per second (263 m^{3}/s), registered on July 1, 1962. From July 22 to July 30, 1976, the discharge was recorded as zero.

== See also ==
- List of rivers of South Dakota
- List of rivers of Nebraska
