= Tripp County, South Dakota =

County in South Dakota, United States

- County
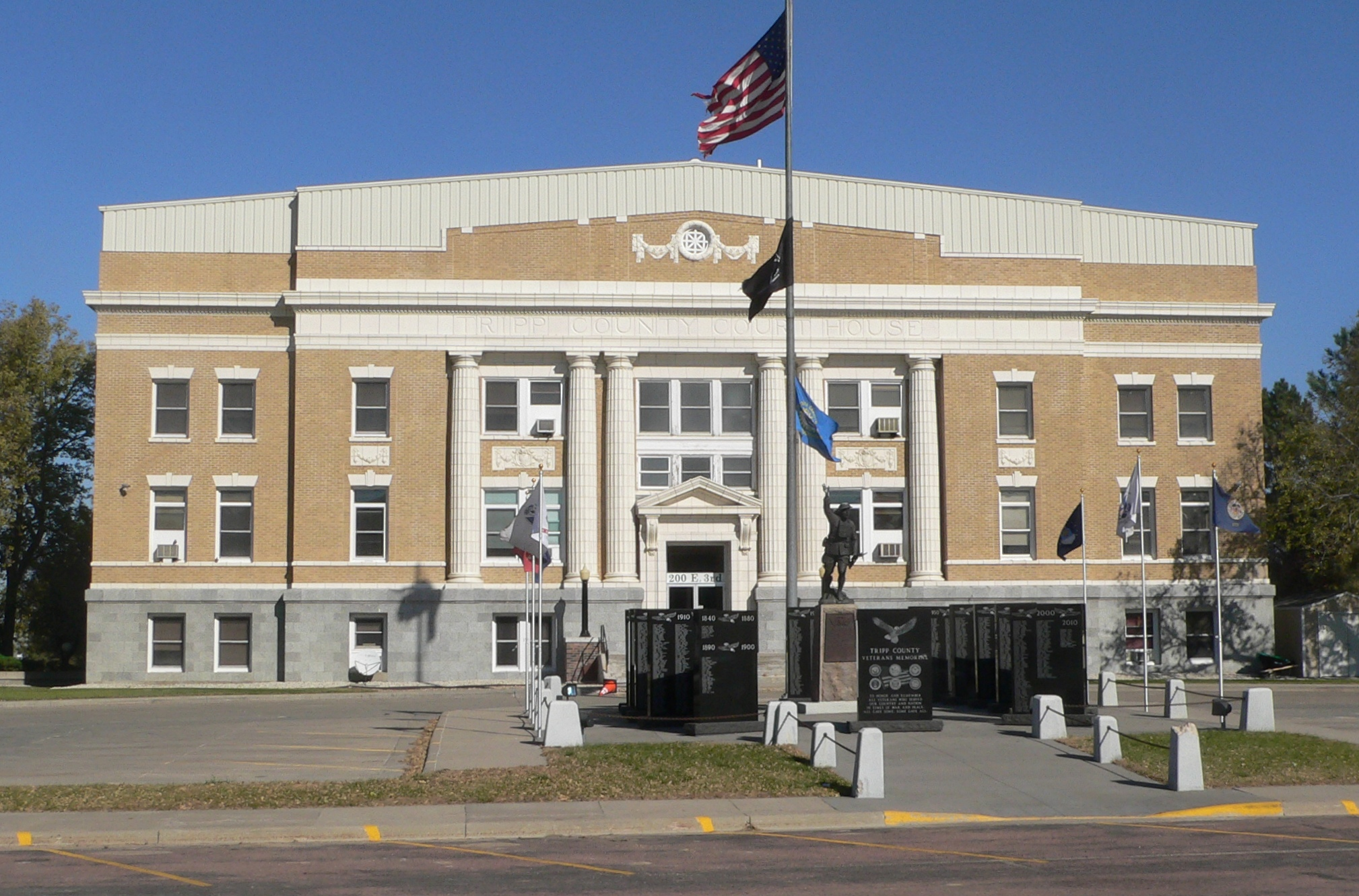
- Tripp County Courthouse in Winner

- Location within the U.S. state of South Dakota
- Coordinates: 43°20′N 99°53′W
- Country: United States
- State: South Dakota
- Created: 1873
- Organized: 1909
- Named for: Bartlett Tripp
- Seat: Winner
- Largest city: Winner

Area
  - Total: 1,618 sq mi (4,190 km^{2})
  - Land: 1,612 sq mi (4,180 km^{2})
  - Water: 5.1 sq mi (13 km^{2}) 0.3%

Population (2020)
  - Total: 5,624
  - Estimate (2025): 5,708 ▲
  - Density: 3.489/sq mi (1.347/km^{2})
- Time zone: UTC−6 (Central)
  - Summer (DST): UTC−5 (CDT)
- Congressional district: At-large
- Website: trippcounty.us

Tripp County is a county in the U.S. state of South Dakota. As of the 2020 census, the population was 5,624. Its county seat is Winner. The county was created in 1873, and was organized in 1909. It is named for lawyer, judge, and diplomat Bartlett Tripp.

On May 8th, 1965, the county was struck by the only recorded F5 tornado in South Dakota history. The tornado was a mile wide and injured 1 person while tracking through the eastern portion of the county.

== Geography ==
Tripp County lies on the south line of South Dakota. Its south boundary is the Nebraska state line, while its north boundary is the meandering White River. The Keya Paha River flows east-southeasterly through the lower part of the county. The county terrain is composed of rolling hills carved by gullies and drainages. The county terrain generally slopes to the south and east, although its upper portion drops northward into the White River valley. The county's highest point is on the lower part of its west boundary line, at 2,552 ft (778 m) ASL. The county has a total area of 1,618 square miles (4,190 km^{2}), of which 1,612 square miles (4,180 km^{2}) is land and 5.1 square miles (13 km^{2}) (0.3%) is water.

=== Major highways ===
- U.S. Highway 18
- U.S. Highway 183
- South Dakota Highway 44
- South Dakota Highway 49
- South Dakota Highway 53

=== Adjacent counties ===
- Lyman County – north
- Gregory County – east
- Keya Paha County, Nebraska – south
- Cherry County, Nebraska – southwest
- Todd County – west
- Mellette County – northwest

=== Protected areas ===
- Beaulieu Lake State Game Production Area
- Brown State Game Production Area
- Covey Dam State Game Production Area
- Dog Ear Lake State Game Production Area
- George & Katherine Mann State Game Production Area
- Ideal Wetland State Game Production Area
- King Dam State Game Production Area
- Little Dog Ear Lake State Game Production Area
- McLaughlin State Game Production Area
- Rahn Lake State Game Production Area
- Roosevelt Lake State Game Production Area
- Snow Dam State Game Production Area

=== Lakes ===
- Roosevelt Lake

== Demographics ==
Historical population
Census	Pop.	Note	%±
1910	8,323		—
1920	11,970		43.8%
1930	12,712		6.2%
1940	9,937		−21.8%
1950	9,139		−8.0%
1960	8,761		−4.1%
1970	8,171		−6.7%
1980	7,268		−11.1%
1990	6,924		−4.7%
2000	6,430		−7.1%
2010	5,644		−12.2%
2020	5,624		−0.4%
2025 (est.)	5,708	▲	1.5%
U.S. Decennial Census; 1790–1960 1900–1990; 1990–2000 2010–2020

=== 2020 census ===
As of the 2020 census, there were 5,624 people, 2,233 households, and 1,398 families residing in the county. Of the residents, 23.8% were under the age of 18 and 21.9% were 65 years of age or older; the median age was 43.0 years. For every 100 females there were 103.7 males, and for every 100 females age 18 and over there were 102.8 males. The population density was 3.5 inhabitants per square mile (1.4/km^{2}). There were 2,762 housing units, of which 19.2% were vacant. Among occupied housing units, 71.2% were owner-occupied and 28.8% were renter-occupied. The homeowner vacancy rate was 1.7% and the rental vacancy rate was 13.0%.

The racial makeup of the county was 76.9% White, 0.2% Black or African American, 17.5% American Indian and Alaska Native, 0.1% Asian, 0.4% from some other race, and 4.9% from two or more races. Hispanic or Latino residents of any race comprised 1.0% of the population.

Of the 2,233 households in the county, 27.4% had children under the age of 18 living with them and 23.6% had a female householder with no spouse or partner present. About 33.1% of all households were made up of individuals and 14.9% had someone living alone who was 65 years of age or older.

=== 2010 census ===
As of the 2010 census, there were 5,644 people, 2,419 households, and 1,509 families in the county. The population density was 3.5 inhabitants per square mile (1.4/km^{2}). There were 3,072 housing units at an average density of 1.9 per square mile (0.73/km^{2}). The racial makeup of the county was 83.1% white, 14.0% American Indian, 0.2% Asian, 0.1% black or African American, 0.2% from other races, and 2.4% from two or more races. Those of Hispanic or Latino origin made up 1.1% of the population. In terms of ancestry, 46.8% were German, 10.8% were Irish, 7.7% were Czech, 6.2% were Dutch, and 4.0% were American.

Of the 2,419 households, 26.9% had children under the age of 18 living with them, 50.4% were married couples living together, 8.4% had a female householder with no husband present, 37.6% were non-families, and 34.6% of all households were made up of individuals. The average household size was 2.28 and the average family size was 2.93. The median age was 45.3 years.

The median income for a household in the county was $40,221 and the median income for a family was $49,570. Males had a median income of $35,238 versus $25,323 for females. The per capita income for the county was $21,192. About 12.1% of families and 16.5% of the population were below the poverty line, including 27.4% of those under age 18 and 10.3% of those age 65 or over.

== Communities ==
=== Cities ===
- Colome
- Winner (county seat)

=== Town ===
- New Witten (called "Witten" by the U.S. Post Office)

=== Census-designated place ===
- Hamill (Population:14)
- Ideal (Population:86)

=== Unincorporated communities ===
- Carter
- Clearfield
- Jordan Junction
- Keyapaha
- Millboro
- Wewela

=== Townships ===
- Banner
- Beaver Creek
- Black
- Brunson
- Bull Creek
- Carter
- Colome
- Condon
- Curlew
- Dog Ear
- Elliston
- Greenwood
- Holsclaw
- Huggins
- Ideal
- Irwin
- Jordan
- Keyapaha
- King
- Lake
- Lamro
- Lincoln
- Lone Star
- Lone Tree
- McNeely
- Millboro
- Pahapesto
- Plainview
- Pleasant Valley
- Pleasant View
- Progressive
- Rames
- Rosedale
- Roseland
- Star Prairie
- Star Valley
- Stewart
- Sully
- Taylor
- Valley
- Weave
- Willow Creek
- Wilson
- Witten
- Wortman
- Wright

=== Unorganized territory ===
The county contains one area of unorganized territory: Gassman.

== Politics ==
Tripp County voters have traditionally voted Republican. In no national election since 1964 has the county selected the Democratic Party candidate (as of 2024). The Democratic Party has not obtained forty percent of the county's vote since Jimmy Carter in 1976.

United States presidential election results for Tripp County, South Dakota
Year	Republican		Democratic		Third party(ies)	
Year	No.	%	No.	%	No.	%
1912	0	0.00%	982	43.66%	1,267	56.34%
1916	1,074	43.57%	1,341	54.40%	50	2.03%
1920	1,819	59.33%	968	31.57%	279	9.10%
1924	1,647	42.45%	932	24.02%	1,301	33.53%
1928	2,396	53.02%	2,099	46.45%	24	0.53%
1932	1,147	23.67%	3,647	75.26%	52	1.07%
1936	1,693	37.75%	2,708	60.38%	84	1.87%
1940	2,492	54.40%	2,089	45.60%	0	0.00%
1944	1,911	53.82%	1,640	46.18%	0	0.00%
1948	1,845	48.32%	1,918	50.24%	55	1.44%
1952	2,790	65.88%	1,445	34.12%	0	0.00%
1956	2,064	52.94%	1,835	47.06%	0	0.00%
1960	2,466	58.52%	1,748	41.48%	0	0.00%
1964	1,937	46.36%	2,241	53.64%	0	0.00%
1968	2,242	58.25%	1,362	35.39%	245	6.37%
1972	2,592	62.73%	1,538	37.22%	2	0.05%
1976	1,980	51.87%	1,822	47.73%	15	0.39%
1980	2,669	70.68%	947	25.08%	160	4.24%
1984	2,483	72.18%	935	27.18%	22	0.64%
1988	2,113	62.96%	1,219	36.32%	24	0.72%
1992	1,459	43.38%	1,046	31.10%	858	25.51%
1996	1,680	53.64%	1,088	34.74%	364	11.62%
2000	1,909	69.04%	799	28.90%	57	2.06%
2004	2,230	68.72%	972	29.95%	43	1.33%
2008	1,859	65.48%	914	32.19%	66	2.32%
2012	1,905	70.79%	737	27.39%	49	1.82%
2016	2,069	78.67%	462	17.57%	99	3.76%
2020	2,161	80.16%	495	18.36%	40	1.48%
2024	2,150	81.01%	470	17.71%	34	1.28%

== See also ==
- National Register of Historic Places listings in Tripp County, South Dakota
