= Winner, South Dakota =

- City
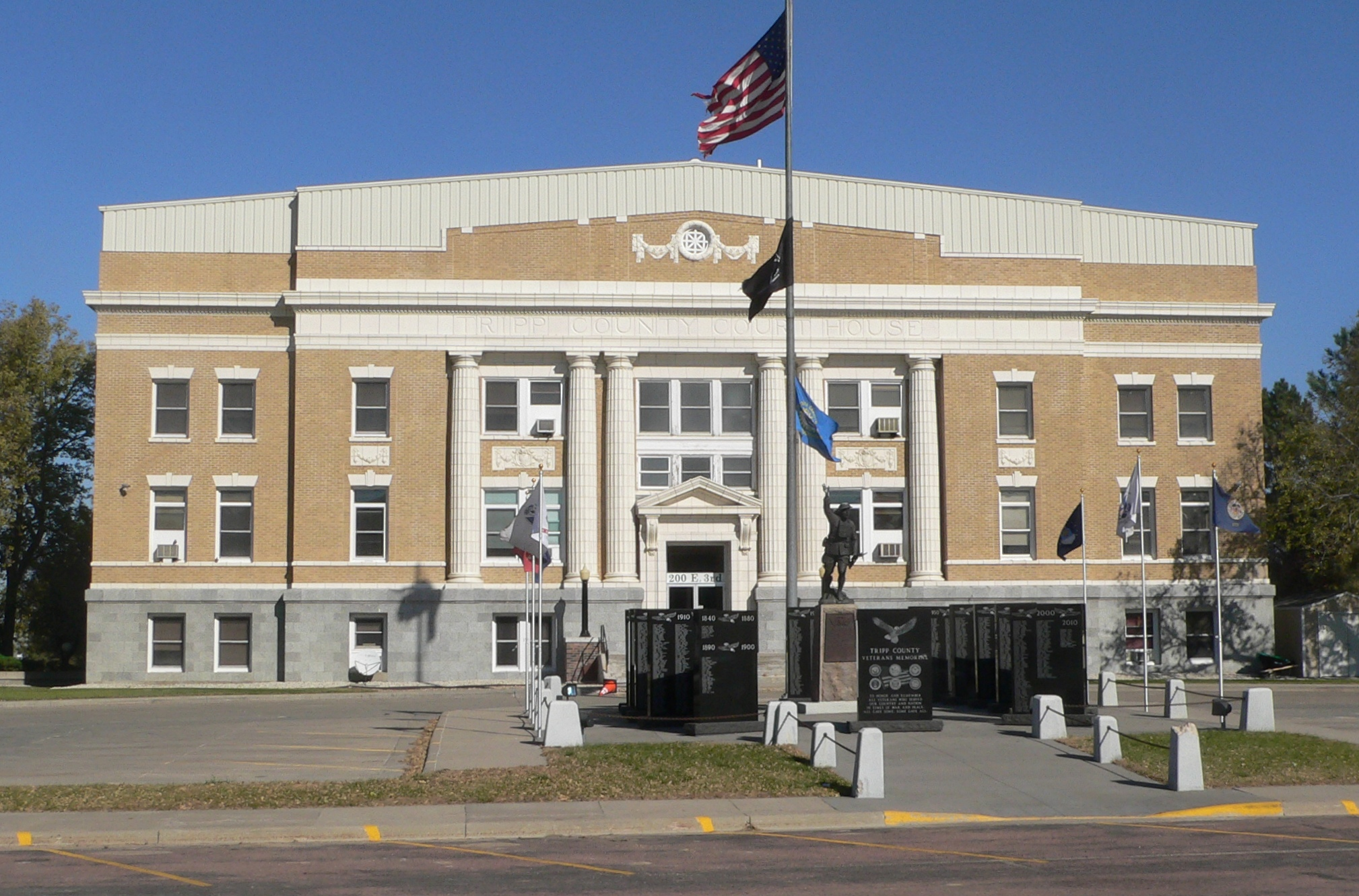
- Tripp County courthouse in Winner

- Location in Tripp County and the state of South Dakota
- Coordinates: 43°22′35″N 99°52′12″W
- Country: United States
- State: South Dakota
- County: Tripp
- Incorporated: 1911

Area
  - Total: 2.29 sq mi (5.94 km^{2})
  - Land: 2.29 sq mi (5.94 km^{2})
  - Water: 0 sq mi (0.00 km^{2})
- Elevation: 1,969 ft (600 m)

Population (2020)
  - Total: 2,921
  - Density: 1,274.4/sq mi (492.05/km^{2})
- Time zone: UTC-6 (Central (CST))
  - Summer (DST): UTC-5 (CDT)
- ZIP code: 57580
- Area code: 605
- FIPS code: 46-72180
- GNIS feature ID: 1267659
- Website: www.winnersd.org

Winner is a city in central Tripp County, South Dakota, United States. The population was 2,921 at the 2020 census. It is the county seat of Tripp County. Winner also serves as the administrative center of neighboring Todd County, which does not have its own county seat. The nearest airport is Winner Regional Airport.

Winner was laid out in 1909, and named for the fact the town had emerged the "winner" as the county's most successful trading point.

== History ==
=== Settlement and founding ===
The area surrounding present-day Winner was historically part of the lands of the Sicangu, or Brulé Lakota, and subsequently the Rosebud Indian Reservation. The federal government opened portions of the reservation in Tripp County to non-Native settlement under legislation enacted on March 2, 1907. President Theodore Roosevelt issued a proclamation on August 24, 1908, establishing a registration and lottery system for homestead entries beginning in 1909.

Tripp County was organized in 1909, with the nearby settlement of Lamro selected as its temporary county seat. Lamro had been established in 1907 and developed into a community with businesses, a school, a post office, and a courthouse.

In late 1909, the Western Townsite Company established Winner approximately two and a half miles northeast of Lamro, along the proposed route of the Chicago and North Western Railway. The first town lot sale was held on December 21, 1909. The new town quickly attracted businesses and residents, including some who relocated from Lamro. Its name reflected the promoters' ambitions to succeed in the competition for the railroad and county seat.

=== County seat contest ===
The establishment of Winner sparked a contentious rivalry with Lamro and Colome over the permanent location of the Tripp County seat. In an election held on November 8, 1910, Winner received the most votes, defeating both Colome and Lamro. The county seat was officially established at Winner following the election.

Following the decision, the courthouse and numerous commercial buildings were moved from Lamro to Winner. Some buildings were transported across the prairie using steam traction engines. The loss of the county seat and the failure to secure a railroad connection led to Lamro's abandonment.

On January 15, 1911, the wooden courthouse that had been relocated from Lamro was destroyed by fire. Most county records kept in the building were lost. At the time, Winner lacked adequate firefighting facilities to save the structure.

=== Incorporation and early growth ===
Winner incorporated in 1911 following a municipal election on March 21, in which all 74 votes cast favored incorporation. The city's first municipal election was held on April 18, with F. M. Ziebach selected as its first mayor.

The Chicago and North Western Railway reached Winner on July 2, 1911. A public celebration followed on July 4, marking the arrival of rail service. The railway provided transportation for residents and agricultural products and contributed to Winner's development as a commercial center for the surrounding farming and ranching region.

== Geography ==
According to the United States Census Bureau, the city has a total area of 2.20 square miles (5.70 km^{2}), all land.

=== Climate ===
Winner, located in the south central part of the state, features a climate type (Köppen Dfa) often described as a hot summer humid continental climate. Winters average below the −3 °C (26.6 °F) persistent snow line isotherm, and summers average above the 22 °C (72 °F) Köppen hot summer isotherm. The climate features nearly even four seasons, typical of its classification. The all-time high temperature is 115 °F (46 °C), set in 1934, and the all-time low temperature is −38 °F (−39 °C), set in 1936.

Climate data for Winner, South Dakota (1991–2020 normals, extremes 1910–present)
Month	Jan	Feb	Mar	Apr	May	Jun	Jul	Aug	Sep	Oct	Nov	Dec	Year
Record high °F (°C)	73 (23)	78 (26)	91 (33)	99 (37)	106 (41)	110 (43)	115 (46)	112 (44)	108 (42)	97 (36)	89 (32)	76 (24)	115 (46)
Mean maximum °F (°C)	59.5 (15.3)	64.6 (18.1)	76.9 (24.9)	84.2 (29.0)	89.8 (32.1)	95.3 (35.2)	102.3 (39.1)	100.6 (38.1)	96.2 (35.7)	87.4 (30.8)	73.9 (23.3)	60.0 (15.6)	103.7 (39.8)
Mean daily maximum °F (°C)	35.2 (1.8)	39.3 (4.1)	49.9 (9.9)	60.7 (15.9)	71.5 (21.9)	81.8 (27.7)	89.6 (32.0)	87.3 (30.7)	79.5 (26.4)	64.7 (18.2)	49.5 (9.7)	37.0 (2.8)	62.2 (16.8)
Daily mean °F (°C)	23.8 (−4.6)	27.1 (−2.7)	37.0 (2.8)	47.7 (8.7)	59.1 (15.1)	69.5 (20.8)	76.4 (24.7)	74.2 (23.4)	65.8 (18.8)	51.5 (10.8)	37.6 (3.1)	26.5 (−3.1)	49.7 (9.8)
Mean daily minimum °F (°C)	12.5 (−10.8)	14.9 (−9.5)	24.1 (−4.4)	34.7 (1.5)	46.8 (8.2)	57.1 (13.9)	63.1 (17.3)	61.0 (16.1)	52.0 (11.1)	38.4 (3.6)	25.7 (−3.5)	16.0 (−8.9)	37.2 (2.9)
Mean minimum °F (°C)	−9.7 (−23.2)	−4.7 (−20.4)	3.6 (−15.8)	19.7 (−6.8)	32.0 (0.0)	44.7 (7.1)	52.1 (11.2)	50.8 (10.4)	36.7 (2.6)	21.8 (−5.7)	7.8 (−13.4)	−4.7 (−20.4)	−14.6 (−25.9)
Record low °F (°C)	−28 (−33)	−38 (−39)	−19 (−28)	1 (−17)	17 (−8)	30 (−1)	40 (4)	34 (1)	20 (−7)	−2 (−19)	−13 (−25)	−29 (−34)	−38 (−39)
Average precipitation inches (mm)	0.54 (14)	0.64 (16)	1.12 (28)	2.81 (71)	3.63 (92)	3.92 (100)	2.62 (67)	2.42 (61)	2.15 (55)	1.82 (46)	0.81 (21)	0.69 (18)	23.17 (589)
Average snowfall inches (cm)	7.2 (18)	6.9 (18)	8.3 (21)	9.2 (23)	0.0 (0.0)	0.0 (0.0)	0.0 (0.0)	0.0 (0.0)	0.0 (0.0)	1.9 (4.8)	6.0 (15)	9.6 (24)	49.1 (125)
Average precipitation days (≥ 0.01 in)	4.5	4.2	5.5	7.8	9.1	9.5	7.1	6.2	4.9	5.7	4.0	4.3	72.8
Average snowy days (≥ 0.1 in)	3.4	3.1	2.6	1.6	0.0	0.0	0.0	0.0	0.0	0.7	2.3	3.6	17.3
Source: NOAA

Winner, South Dakota

Climate chart (precipitation, max. and min. temperature)
J	F	M	A	M	J	J	A	S	O	N	D
0.5 34 12	0.7 38 15	1.5 48 23	2.7 60 34	3.8 71 47	3.9 81 57	2.9 88 63	2.2 87 60	2.2 78 50	1.9 64 37	1 47 25	0.6 34 14
- █ Average max. and min. temperatures in °F
- █ Precipitation totals in inches
- Source: The Weather Channel
Metric conversion
J	F	M	A	M	J	J	A	S	O	N	D
13 1 −11	17 3 −9	39 9 −5	69 16 1	96 22 8	99 27 14	75 31 17	57 31 16	57 26 10	47 18 3	25 8 −4	15 1 −10
- █ Average max. and min. temperatures in °C
- █ Precipitation totals in mm

== Demographics ==
Historical population
Census	Pop.	Note	%±
1920	2,000		—
1930	2,220		11.0%
1940	2,426		9.3%
1950	3,252		34.0%
1960	3,705		13.9%
1970	3,789		2.3%
1980	3,472		−8.4%
1990	3,354		−3.4%
2000	3,137		−6.5%
2010	2,897		−7.7%
2020	2,921		0.8%
U.S. Decennial Census; 2015 Estimate

=== 2020 census ===
As of the 2020 census, Winner had a population of 2,921. The median age was 42.2 years. 23.2% of residents were under the age of 18 and 21.2% of residents were 65 years of age or older. For every 100 females there were 96.7 males, and for every 100 females age 18 and over there were 95.6 males age 18 and over.

0.0% of residents lived in urban areas, while 100.0% lived in rural areas.

There were 1,221 households in Winner, of which 26.3% had children under the age of 18 living in them. Of all households, 39.8% were married-couple households, 22.0% were households with a male householder and no spouse or partner present, and 30.3% were households with a female householder and no spouse or partner present. About 39.5% of all households were made up of individuals and 18.3% had someone living alone who was 65 years of age or older.

There were 1,438 housing units, of which 15.1% were vacant. The homeowner vacancy rate was 2.1% and the rental vacancy rate was 14.4%.

Racial composition as of the 2020 census
Race	Number	Percent
White	2,178	74.6%
Black or African American	5	0.2%
American Indian and Alaska Native	558	19.1%
Asian	3	0.1%
Native Hawaiian and Other Pacific Islander	0	0.0%
Some other race	15	0.5%
Two or more races	162	5.5%
Hispanic or Latino (of any race)	38	1.3%

=== 2010 census ===
As of the census of 2010, there were 2,897 people, 1,328 households, and 717 families living in the city. The population density was 1,316.8 inhabitants per square mile (508.4/km^{2}). There were 1,547 housing units at an average density of 703.2 per square mile (271.5/km^{2}). The racial makeup of the city was 82.1% White, 0.2% African American, 14.0% Native American, 0.3% Asian, 0.3% from other races, and 3.2% from two or more races. Hispanic or Latino of any race were 1.4% of the population.

There were 1,328 households, of which 24.2% had children under the age of 18 living with them, 39.5% were married couples living together, 10.9% had a female householder with no husband present, 3.5% had a male householder with no wife present, and 46.0% were non-families. 42.5% of all households were made up of individuals, and 22.9% had someone living alone who was 65 years of age or older. The average household size was 2.08 and the average family size was 2.85.

The median age in the city was 45.6 years. 21.4% of residents were under the age of 18; 7.5% were between the ages of 18 and 24; 20.2% were from 25 to 44; 26.2% were from 45 to 64; and 24.6% were 65 years of age or older. The gender makeup of the city was 47.4% male and 52.6% female.

=== 2000 census ===
As of the census of 2000, there were 3,137 people, 1,359 households, and 803 families living in the city. The population density was 2,030.6 inhabitants per square mile (784.0/km^{2}). There were 1,526 housing units at an average density of 987.8 per square mile (381.4/km^{2}). The racial makeup of the city was 89.35% White, 0.06% African American, 9.15% Native American, 0.06% Asian, 0.10% from other races, and 1.28% from two or more races. Hispanic or Latino of any race were 0.70% of the population.

There were 1,359 households, out of which 26.3% had children under the age of 18 living with them, 47.8% were married couples living together, 7.4% had a female householder with no husband present, and 40.9% were non-families. 36.9% of all households were made up of individuals, and 21.1% had someone living alone who was 65 years of age or older. The average household size was 2.24 and the average family size was 2.93.

In the city, the population was spread out, with 24.9% under the age of 18, 6.1% from 18 to 24, 24.4% from 25 to 44, 19.5% from 45 to 64, and 25.2% who were 65 years of age or older. The median age was 42 years. For every 100 females, there were 91.5 males. For every 100 females age 18 and over, there were 84.9 males.

As of 2000 the median income for a household in the city was $26,277, and the median income for a family was $38,472. Males had a median income of $26,858 versus $20,613 for females. The per capita income for the city was $15,717. About 10.7% of families and 16.0% of the population were below the poverty line, including 16.0% of those under age 18 and 18.8% of those age 65 or over.

== Notable people ==
- Sonny Bishop, American football player
- Nicolle Galyon, singer/songwriter
- Frank Leahy, Notre Dame coach
- Delores Taylor, known for her work on the Billy Jack films, was born and raised in Winner

== See also ==
- List of cities in South Dakota
