= Colome, South Dakota =

- City
- Location in Tripp County and the state of South Dakota
- Coordinates: 43°15′36″N 99°43′02″W
- Country: United States
- State: South Dakota
- County: Tripp
- Incorporated: 1910

Government
  - Mayor: Kelly Leighton

Area
  - Total: 0.28 sq mi (0.73 km^{2})
  - Land: 0.28 sq mi (0.73 km^{2})
  - Water: 0 sq mi (0.00 km^{2})
- Elevation: 2,307 ft (703 m)

Population (2020)
  - Total: 331
  - Density: 1,173.7/sq mi (453.16/km^{2})
- Time zone: UTC-6 (Central (CST))
  - Summer (DST): UTC-5 (CDT)
- ZIP code: 57528
- Area code: 605
- FIPS code: 46-13300
- GNIS feature ID: 1267333
- Website: colomesd.org

Colome is a city in Tripp County, South Dakota, United States. The population was 331 as of the 2020 census.

== Geography ==
According to the United States Census Bureau, the city has a total area of 0.27 square miles (0.70 km^{2}), all land.

== Demographics ==
Historical population
| Census | Pop. | Note | %± |
|---|---|---|---|
| 1920 | 568 | | — |
| 1930 | 599 | | 5.5% |
| 1940 | 509 | | −15.0% |
| 1950 | 451 | | −11.4% |
| 1960 | 398 | | −11.8% |
| 1970 | 375 | | −5.8% |
| 1980 | 361 | | −3.7% |
| 1990 | 309 | | −14.4% |
| 2000 | 340 | | 10.0% |
| 2010 | 296 | | −12.9% |
| 2020 | 331 | | 11.8% |
U.S. Decennial Census

=== 2020 census ===
As of the 2020 census, Colome had a population of 331. The median age was 39.9 years. 24.2% of residents were under the age of 18 and 21.8% of residents were 65 years of age or older. For every 100 females there were 106.9 males, and for every 100 females age 18 and over there were 105.7 males age 18 and over.

0.0% of residents lived in urban areas, while 100.0% lived in rural areas.

There were 115 households in Colome, of which 26.1% had children under the age of 18 living in them. Of all households, 47.0% were married-couple households, 23.5% were households with a male householder and no spouse or partner present, and 25.2% were households with a female householder and no spouse or partner present. About 42.6% of all households were made up of individuals and 18.3% had someone living alone who was 65 years of age or older.

There were 153 housing units, of which 24.8% were vacant. The homeowner vacancy rate was 0.0% and the rental vacancy rate was 26.5%.

Racial composition as of the 2020 census
| Race | Number | Percent |
|---|---|---|
| White | 260 | 78.5% |
| Black or African American | 0 | 0.0% |
| American Indian and Alaska Native | 42 | 12.7% |
| Asian | 0 | 0.0% |
| Native Hawaiian and Other Pacific Islander | 0 | 0.0% |
| Some other race | 0 | 0.0% |
| Two or more races | 29 | 8.8% |
| Hispanic or Latino (of any race) | 0 | 0.0% |

=== 2010 census ===
As of the census of 2010, there were 296 people, 140 households, and 79 families residing in the city. The population density was 1,096.3 inhabitants per square mile (423.3/km^{2}). There were 174 housing units at an average density of 644.4 per square mile (248.8/km^{2}). The racial makeup of the city was 93.9% White, 3.7% Native American, 0.7% Asian, and 1.7% from two or more races.

There were 140 households, of which 24.3% had children under the age of 18 living with them, 47.1% were married couples living together, 6.4% had a female householder with no husband present, 2.9% had a male householder with no wife present, and 43.6% were non-families. 42.1% of all households were made up of individuals, and 22.8% had someone living alone who was 65 years of age or older. The average household size was 2.11 and the average family size was 2.87.

The median age in the city was 43.7 years. 26% of residents were under the age of 18; 3.5% were between the ages of 18 and 24; 23.2% were from 25 to 44; 24.7% were from 45 to 64; and 22.6% were 65 years of age or older. The gender makeup of the city was 46.3% male and 53.7% female.

=== 2000 census ===
As of the census of 2000, there were 340 people, 148 households, and 95 families residing in the city. The population density was 1,271.0 inhabitants per square mile (490.7/km^{2}). There were 170 housing units at an average density of 635.5 per square mile (245.4/km^{2}). The racial makeup of the city was 94.12% White, 2.06% Native American, 0.29% Asian, and 3.53% from two or more races. Hispanic or Latino of any race were 0.29% of the population.

There were 148 households, out of which 31.8% had children under the age of 18 living with them, 53.4% were married couples living together, 8.1% had a female householder with no husband present, and 35.8% were non-families. 34.5% of all households were made up of individuals, and 18.2% had someone living alone who was 65 years of age or older. The average household size was 2.29 and the average family size was 2.93.

In the city, the population was spread out, with 27.4% under the age of 18, 7.1% from 18 to 24, 24.4% from 25 to 44, 22.4% from 45 to 64, and 18.8% who were 65 years of age or older. The median age was 38 years. For every 100 females, there were 92.1 males. For every 100 females age 18 and over, there were 83.0 males.

The median income for a household in the city was $26,771, and the median income for a family was $31,875. Males had a median income of $23,281 versus $18,917 for females. The per capita income for the city was $12,844. About 23.6% of families and 21.3% of the population were below the poverty line, including 21.1% of those under age 18 and 11.7% of those age 65 or over.

== History ==
Colome was laid out in 1905, and named by two brothers, founders of the town who gave it their family name, Colombe. In June 1978 the final train passed through Colome on its way back to Norfolk and the railway line was abandoned.
