= White River (Missouri River tributary) =

River in Nebraska and South Dakota, United States

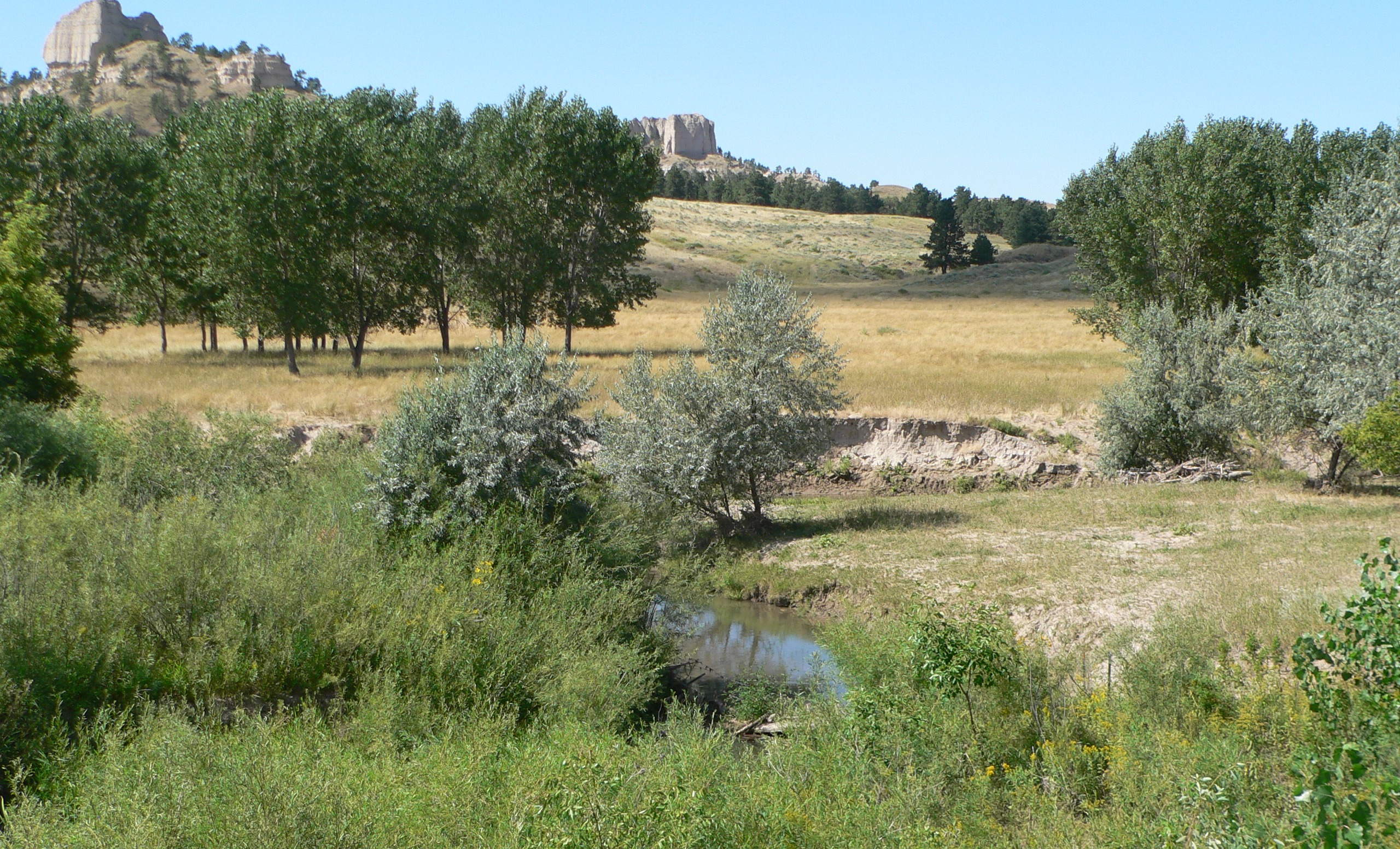
- White River at the U.S. Highway 20 crossing west of Crawford in northwest Nebraska

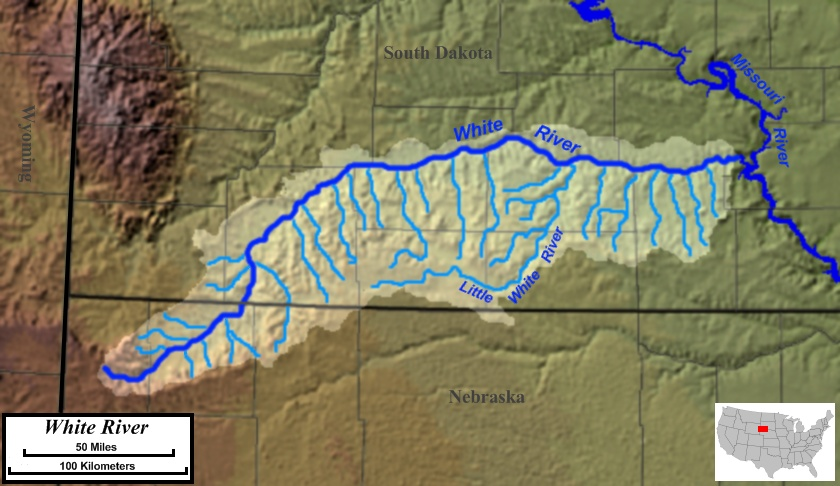
- White River watershed

- Location of the mouth of the White River in South Dakota
- Native name: Makhízita Wakpá (Lakota)

Location
- Country: United States
- State: Nebraska, South Dakota
- County: Sioux, Oglala Lakota, Pennington, Jackson, Jones, Mellette, Tripp, Lyman

Physical characteristics
- Source: Pine Ridge
  - location: near Harrison, Sioux County, Nebraska
  - coordinates: 42°41′10″N 103°50′14″W
  - elevation: 4,861 ft (1,482 m)
- Mouth: Missouri River
  - location: near Chamberlain, Lyman County, South Dakota
  - coordinates: 43°42′50″N 99°28′01″W
  - elevation: 1,601 ft (488 m)
- Length: 580 mi (930 km)
- Basin size: 10,200 sq mi (26,000 km^{2})
- Discharge
  - average: 570 cu ft/s (16 m^{3}/s)
  - minimum: 0 cu ft/s (0 m^{3}/s)
  - maximum: 51,900 cu ft/s (1,470 m^{3}/s)

Basin features
- Tributaries
  - left: Soldier Spring Creek, Tucker Creek, Buck Creek, Charcoal Creek, Soldier Creek, Little Cottonwood Creek, Big Cottonwood Creek, Lone Tree Creek, Bohemian Creek, Madden Creek, Alkali Creek, Slim Butte Creek, Blacktail Creek, Cedar Bluff Creek, Willow Creek, Mule Creek, West Horse Creek, East Horse Creek, Sand Creek, Fog Creek, Cottonwood Creek, Spring Creek, Wind Creek, Big Hollow Creek, Clifford Creek, Cain Creek, Sixteenmile Creek, Fifteenmile Creek, Cottonwood Creek, O'Donald Creek, Ash Creek, Horse Creek, Hay Creek, Johnny Creek, Spring Creek, Pitan Creek, Williams Creek, Sedlano Creek, Mission Creek, Mill Iron Creek, Davis Creek, Bad Creek, Red Butte Creek
  - right: Hile Creek, Kyle Creek, Bull Creek, Spring Creek, Deep Creek, Deadmans Creek, Cherry Creek, Bozle Creek, White Clay Creek, Hooker Creek, Ash Creek, Indian Creek, Trunk Butte Creek, Dead Horse Creek, Grass Creek, Wounded Knee Creek, Porcupine Creek, Palmer Creek, Medicine Root Creek, Redwater Creek, Potato Creek, Lost Dog Creek, Eagle Nest Creek, Craven Creek, Long Creek, Cottonwood Creek, Pass Creek, Nancy Hanks Creek, Red Stone Creek, Deep Creek, Plum Creek, Black Pipe Creek, Runs Close Creek, Yukmi Creek, Cedar Creek, Roundup Creek, Butch Creek, Cottonwood Creek, Kaiser Creek, White Thunder Creek, Louis Creek, Oak Creek, Little Dog Creek, Cottonwood Creek, Dog Ear Creek, Thunder Creek, Black Dog Creek, Waver Tree Creek, Sand Creek

The White River (Lakota: Makhízita Wakpá) is a Missouri River tributary that flows 580 miles (930 km) through the U.S. states of Nebraska and South Dakota. The name stems from the water's white-gray color, a function of eroded sand, clay, and volcanic ash carried by the river from its source near the Badlands. Draining a basin of about 10,200 square miles (26,000 km^{2}), about 8,500 square miles (22,000 km^{2}) of which is in South Dakota, the stream flows through a region of sparsely populated hills, plateaus, and badlands.

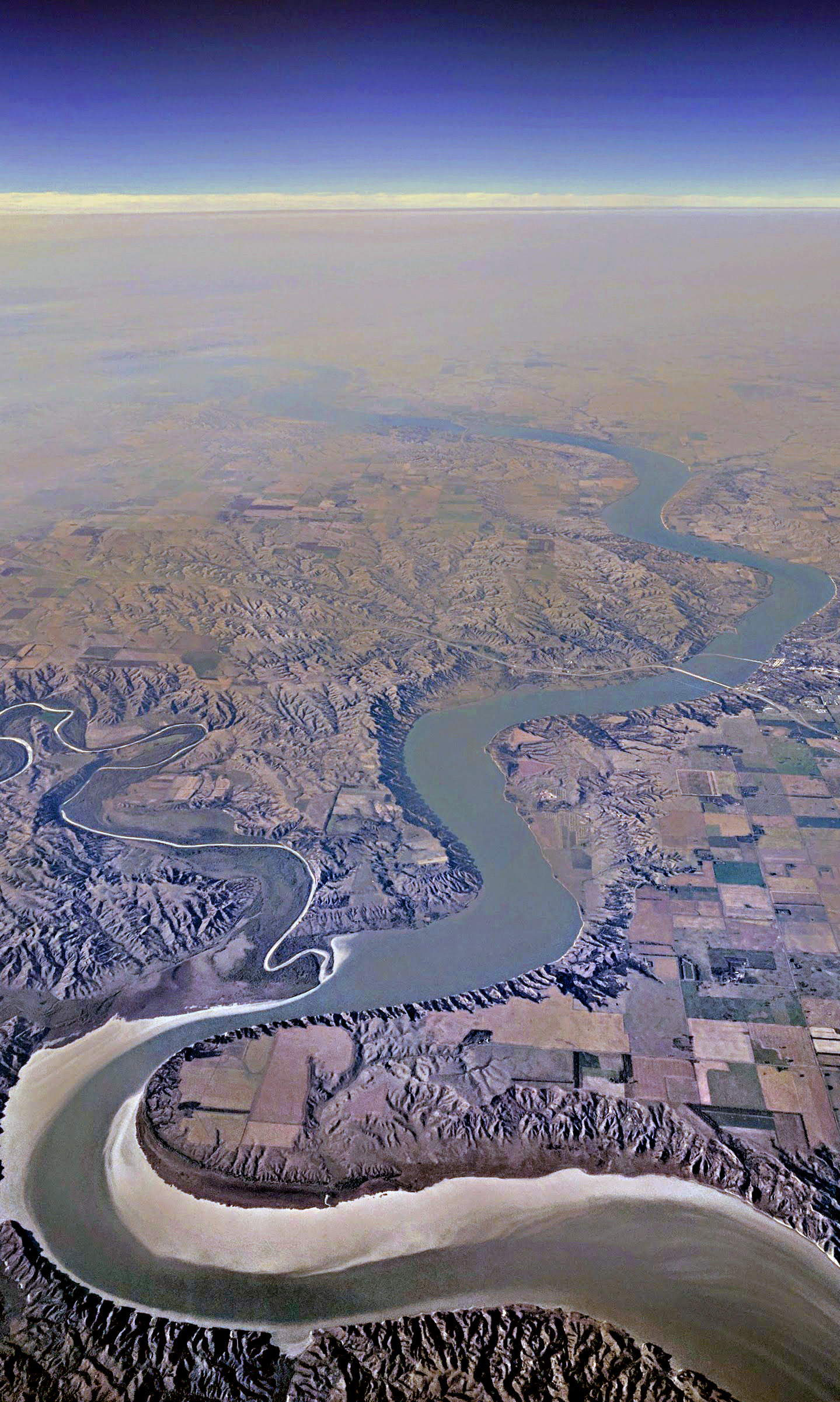
Aerial view from the south of the Missouri River in South Dakota, where the much smaller White River flows into it from the west. The Interstate 90 bridge is visible in the distance.

The White River rises in northwestern Nebraska, in the Pine Ridge escarpment north of Harrison, at an elevation of 4,861 feet (1,482 m) above sea level. It flows southeast then northeast past Fort Robinson and north of Crawford. It crosses into southwestern South Dakota and flows north across the Pine Ridge Indian Reservation, then northeast, receiving Wounded Knee Creek and flowing between units of Badlands National Park. It flows east-northeast and southeast at the northern edge of the reservation, forming the northern boundary of the reservation and the southern boundary of Buffalo Gap National Grassland. It receives the Little White River about 15 miles (24 km) south of Murdo, and flows east to join the Missouri in Lake Francis Case about 15 miles (24 km) southwest of Chamberlain.

The river sometimes has no surface flow due to the dry climate surrounding its badlands and prairie basin, though thunderstorms can cause brief intense flow. The river near Chamberlain flows year-round. As of 2001, the White River had generally good-quality water.

== Industrial use ==
As of November 2019, TC Energy was applying for permits in the state to tap the White River to use water for the construction of Phase 4 of the Keystone pipeline, including camp construction to house transient construction workers.

== See also ==
- White River Fauna (prehistoric)
- List of rivers of Nebraska
- List of rivers of South Dakota

== Works cited ==
- Benke, Arthur C., ed., and Cushing, Colbert E., ed.; Galat, David L.; Berry, Charles R., Jr.; Peters, Edward J., and White, Robert G. (2005). "Chapter 10: Missouri River Basin" in Rivers of North America. Burlington, Massachusetts: Elsevier Academic Press. ISBN 0-12-088253-1.
