= National Register of Historic Places listings in Jackson County, South Dakota =

Location of Jackson County in South Dakota

This is a list of the National Register of Historic Places listings in Jackson County, South Dakota.

This is intended to be a complete list of the properties and districts on the National Register of Historic Places in Jackson County, South Dakota, United States. The locations of National Register properties and districts for which the latitude and longitude coordinates are included below, may be seen in a map.

There are 8 properties and districts listed on the National Register in the county.

This National Park Service list is complete through NPS recent listings posted March 21, 2025.

== Current listings ==
	Name on the Register	Image	Date listed	Location	City or town	Description
1	Chicago, Milwaukee, and St. Paul Railroad Depot	Chicago, Milwaukee, and St. Paul Railroad Depot	August 13, 1986 (#86001478)	Southern end of Kadoka adjacent to the former Chicago, Milwaukee, St. Paul and Pacific railroad line 43°49′55″N 101°30′34″W	Kadoka	
2	Tom Jones Ranch		October 25, 1990 (#90001653)	5½ miles south of Midland; 43°59′34″N 101°10′58″W	Midland	
3	Lip's Camp		June 11, 1975 (#75002104)	Address restricted	Wanblee	
4	Minuteman Missile National Historic Site	Minuteman Missile National Historic Site	November 29, 1999 (#01000275)	Off of Interstate 90, north of Rapid City; 43°55′52″N 102°09′38″W	Rapid City	A National Historic Site; extends into Pennington County
5	Mt. Moriah Masonic Lodge No. 155	Mt. Moriah Masonic Lodge No. 155	July 28, 2004 (#04000765)	101 Main St., S. 43°50′11″N 101°30′35″W	Kadoka	
6	Pearl Hotel	Pearl Hotel	June 14, 2007 (#07000587)	South Main; 43°50′02″N 101°30′38″W	Kadoka	
7	Prairie Homestead	Prairie Homestead	January 11, 1974 (#74001891)	21070 South Dakota Highway 240; 43°48′04″N 101°54′23″W	Interior	
8	Triangle Ranch		June 3, 1994 (#94000563)	On the south fork of the Bad River, about 11 miles southwest of Philip; 43°55′56″N 101°47′24″W	Philip	

== See also ==
- List of National Historic Landmarks in South Dakota
- National Register of Historic Places listings in South Dakota
