= South Dakota Highway 240 =

State highway in South Dakota, United States

Highway 240
- Badlands Loop
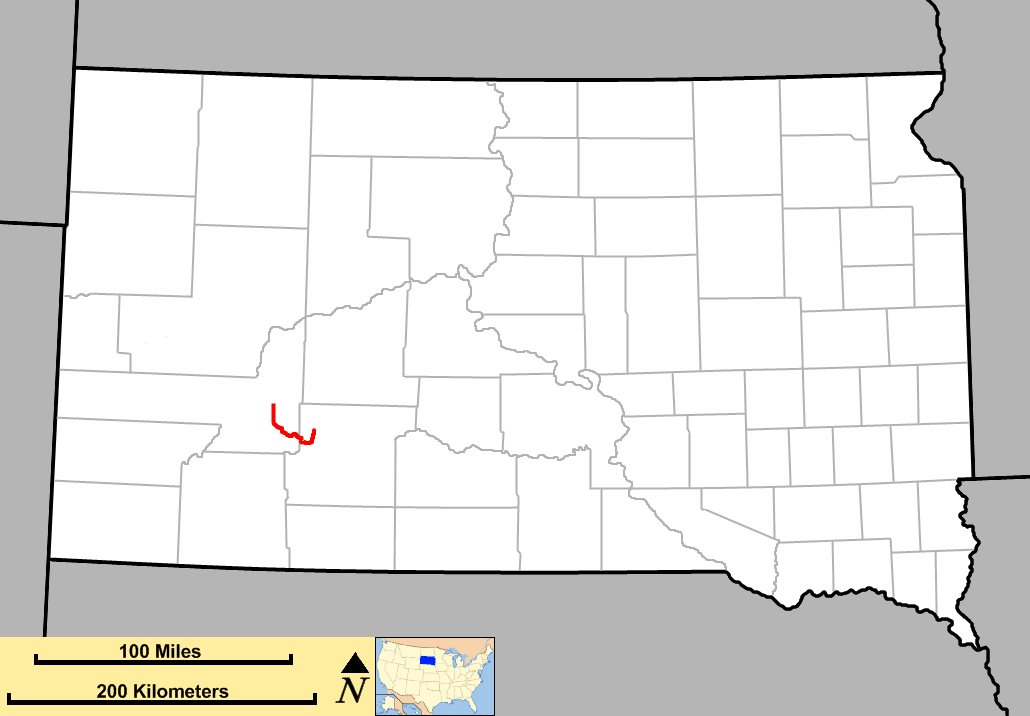

Route information
- Maintained by SDDOT
- Length: 40.033 mi (64.427 km)

Major junctions
- West end: I-90 / I-90 BS / US 14 in Wall
- SD 377 in Badlands National Park northeast of Interior
- East end: I-90 south of Cottonwood

Location
- Country: United States
- State: South Dakota
- Counties: Pennington, Jackson

Highway system
- South Dakota State Trunk Highway System; Interstate; US; State
← SD 239	→ SD 244

South Dakota Highway 240 (SD 240), also signed as the Badlands Loop, is a 40.033-mile-long (64.427 km) state highway in southeastern Pennington and northwestern Jackson counties in South Dakota, United States, that travels through the eastern portion of Badlands National Park.

== Route description ==
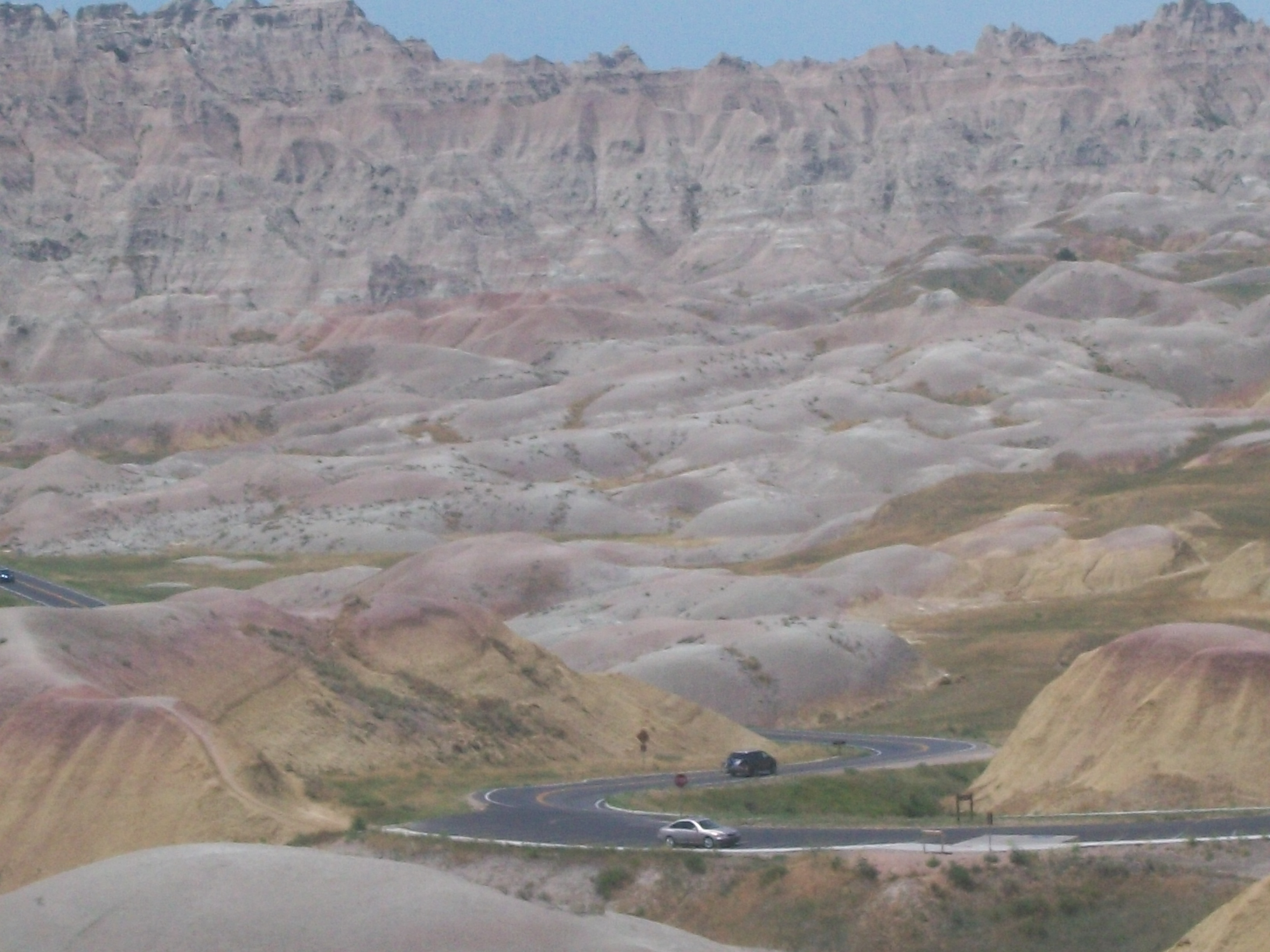
SD 240 winding through Badlands National Park, July 2013

SD 240 begins in Wall at exit 110 of Interstate 90 (I-90). It travels south to Badlands National Park, where it turns southeast. At the Badlands Headquarters at Cedar Pass, the highway turns northeast, ending at exit 131 of I-90 near Cactus Flat. Because the highway enters a national park, there is an entrance fee charged along the highway at either entrance to the park. The fee is $30 per passenger vehicle, good for 7 days.

== History ==
Eastern portions of the highway that are currently designated as SD 240 (generally from the park headquarters to Cactus Flat) were originally part of the original alignment of SD 40. Construction began in the early 1930s. By 1944, a gravel surface was on the Badlands Loop alignment, and by the late 1940s, the Badlands Loop was signed as U.S. Route 16 Alternate (US 16 Alt.), in addition to SD 40 along the eastern portion of the loop. These two numbers were used until the early 1970s, when the SD 40 number was replaced by an extension of SD 44 (which entered the park from the southeast rather than the northeast).

Around 1980, US 16, which traveled concurrently with I-90, was truncated at its eastern end to Rapid City. Since US 16 Alt. no longer met the parent route, the route number was changed to SD 240.

== Major intersections ==
County	Location	mi	km	Destinations	Notes
Pennington	Wall	0.000	0.000	I-90 / US 14 (I-90 Bus. west (Glenn Street north)) – Rapid City, Kadoka	Western terminus of SD 240; eastern terminus of I-90 Bus.; southern terminus of Glenn Street; I-90 exit 110
Pennington	Conata Township	7.4	11.9	Pinnacles Entrance Station; Badlands National Park entrance fee required	
Jackson	Interior Township	31.512	50.714	SD 377 south – SD 44, Interior, Rapid City, Cedar Pass Campground	Northern terminus of SD 377
Jackson	Interior Township	28.6	46.0	Northeast entrance station Badlands National Park entrance fee required	
Jackson	Northwest Jackson	35.3	56.8	Service Road (SD 248)	Western terminus of SD 248
Jackson	Northwest Jackson	40.033	64.427	I-90 / Cottonwood Road north – Wall, Kadoka	Eastern terminus; roadway continues as Cottonwood Road; I-90 exit 131
1.000 mi = 1.609 km; 1.000 km = 0.621 mi: Tolled

== See also ==
- List of state highways in South Dakota
