= Nancy Hanks Creek =

Coordinates: 43.76278°N 101.45806°W

Nancy Hanks Creek is a stream of the Buffalo Gap National Grassland in Jackson County, South Dakota, not far from Kadoka. It has an elevation of 2,103 feet (641 m), and flows into the White River.

== See also ==
- List of rivers of South Dakota
