= Dakota Southern Railway =

South dakota based railroad 1985-2021

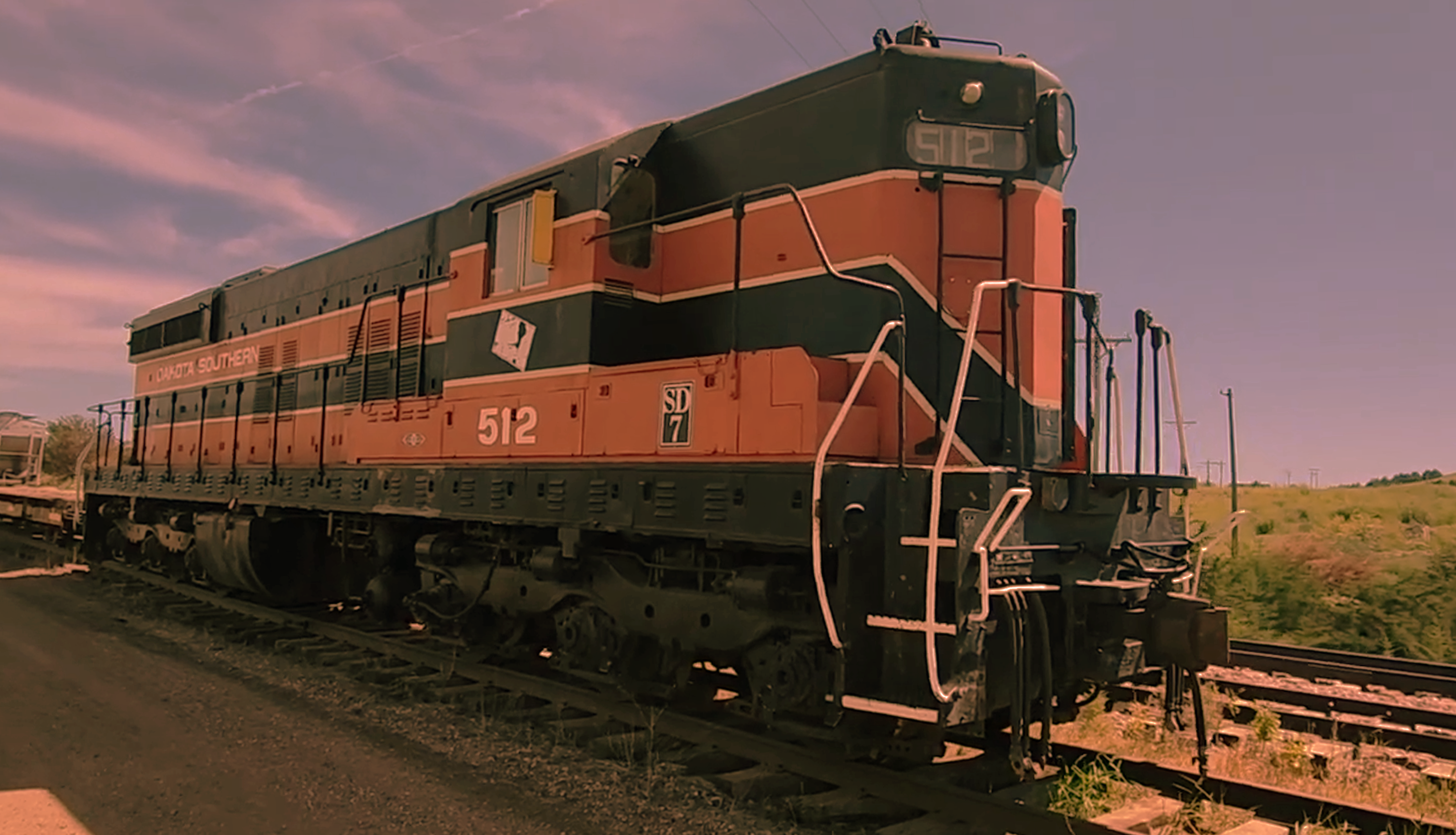
- Dakota Southern SD7 #512 (ex-Milwaukee Road SD7 #512) in Chamberlain, South Dakota

Overview
- Headquarters: Chamberlain, South Dakota
- Reporting mark: DSRC
- Locale: South Dakota
- Dates of operation: 1985–2021
- Predecessor: Chicago, Milwaukee, St. Paul and Pacific Railroad

Technical
- Track gauge: 4 ft 8 1/2 in (1,435 mm) standard gauge

The Dakota Southern Railway (reporting mark DSRC) was a railroad that until late May 2021 ran 189.7 miles (305.3 km) between Kadoka, South Dakota, and Mitchell, South Dakota, and which continued to service the approximately 10 miles (16 km) of remaining active track of the Napa Junction–Platte Line in southern South Dakota. It connected with the BNSF Railway in Mitchell and Napa Junction respectively.

== History ==
The Mitchell–Kadoka line is part of a former secondary branch built by Chicago, Milwaukee, St. Paul and Pacific Railroad, better known as The Milwaukee Road, between Marquette, Iowa and Rapid City, South Dakota between 1880 and 1907. The line lost profitability and at the risk of being abandoned by Milwaukee Road, it was embargoed in 1980 and subsequently bought by the South Dakota Department of Transportation, which still owns the tracks. The purchase was orchestrated by Governor Bill Janklow.

Dakota Southern also operated a line 82.4 miles (132.6 km) from Napa Junction to Platte, South Dakota, which was also constructed and owned by the Chicago, Milwaukee, St. Paul and Pacific Railroad. The operation lasted from 1985 to 1989 before Dakota Southern stopped operating the line. Dakota Southern has since reinstated operations on this line as far as Tabor, almost 30 years after the last train left the line.

The railway originally hauled large amounts of grain, but this business became unprofitable in the late 1990s. Between 2000 and 2007, the railway had just one customer—a folding carton printing plant, not a box factory as often reported, in Mitchell, and thus no trains passed that point. In 2005, however, the railway obtained a haulage agreement with BNSF to allow it to operate to Sioux City, where it could interchange with the Union Pacific Railroad and the Canadian National Railway, making grain service profitable again. After track repairs, service briefly resumed as far as Presho, South Dakota in fall 2007. While the line still officially operates all the way to Kadoka, as the Kadoka-Rapid City portion was rail-banked in 1996, a grade crossing in Vivian is currently paved over, as well as one in Belvidere.

== New ownership and revitalization of the line ==
On October 1, 2009, new owners Mike Williams and Stan Patterson took over the day-to-day operations of the railroad. They both own other rail lines in the country. Mike Williams owns the Bountiful Grain and Craig Mountain Railroad, Ozark Valley Railroad and the Iowa River Railroad. Stan Patterson operates the Washington and Idaho Railway. Initially they planned to rehabilitate the line as far as Murdo, 140 miles west of Mitchell, over three years. The first year was to be from Mitchell to White Lake, the second year to Chamberlain and in the third year rehabilitation would be carried out to Murdo.

In spring 2011 a 16-million-dollar federal Tiger grant was secured to help finance the 28-million-dollar rebuild of 61.6 miles of the line between Mitchell and Chamberlain. Work began in late May 2011. According to former railroad owner Alex Huff, the 65-pound rail was to be replaced with 136, 132 and 115-pound rail. As a result of the rebuilding, two competing companies proposed building 110-car shuttle loading facilities near Kimball, South Dakota. In mid-September 2012 the first regularly scheduled service west of Mitchell since the late 1990s began with twice weekly unit trains of inbound fertilizer and outbound grain to the newly built Liberty Grain elevator east of Kimball.

In fall 2014 Dakota Southern received a Federal Tiger grant to help fund rebuilding an additional 42 miles of the line from Chamberlain to one mile west of Presho. South Dakota Wheat Growers started construction on an agronomy services and shuttle loader facility in the fall of 2014 in Kennebec. The reconstructed line opened and the first 115-car shuttle train arrived and was loaded in Kennebec in October 2016.

Before being rehabilitated the line carried 687 cars in 2010, 3,049 cars in 2013 after rehabilitation between Mitchell and Chamberlain and 9,580 in 2017 after rehabilitation to Presho.

In 2018, Dakota Southern had expressed interest in rehabilitating the line to Murdo, and possibly beyond all the way to Kadoka.

== Platte Line operator ==
In September 2015, 27 years after Dakota Southern stopped operating the line, Dakota Southern was chosen by the State Railway Board to again operate the long out-of-service Napa Junction – Platte line in southern South Dakota. In November 2016, the South Dakota Railway Board agreed with terms on a 10-year contract with Dakota Southern to lease and restore service between Napa Junction and Ravinia. Plans were made to replace 2,000 ties so that the railroad could operate the first 10 miles of track, as far as Tabor, within 30 days. As of November 2021 Google Maps showed that tanker cars were stored on the line as far west as the Tabor elevator. Grade crossings in Tabor were paved over. In addition a 40-million-dollar Dakota Plains Ag Center grain facility opened in 2017 at Napa Junction.

In June 2020 the South Dakota Railway Board agreed to ask the federal Surface Transportation Board to railbank 33 miles of the Platte Line between Tyndall and Ravinia. The remainder of the line beyond Ravinia to Platte had already been railbanked. If approved the ties and rails would be removed and salvaged and Dakota Southern Railway's lease amended to end at Tyndall.

The South Dakota DOT had previously authorized sale of the Platte Line to investors in a proposed ethanol plant in Wagner in 2006, but the sale fell through and the authorization was withdrawn in 2011.

In July 2025 the South Dakota State Rail Board terminated Dakota Southern's lease of the Platte Line 17 months early after Dakota Southern failed to make its May 1, 2025 lease payment of $179,134. Mike Williams stated that car storage revenue had fallen from $6.8 million to $1.2 million in part due to the widespread adoption of precision scheduled railroading.

== Sale of the Mitchell - Kadoka line to Watco ==
On February 17, 2021 the South Dakota State Railway Board authorized the South Dakota Department of Transportation to sell the Mitchell - Kadoka line to Watco, doing business as Ringneck and Western Railroad, LLC, for $13,000,000. The railroad committed to spending $2,000,000 yearly on maintenance for 10 years and to complete a passing siding near Kimball. The sale agreement also included a repurchase agreement in the event of abandonment or discontinuance of service.

== Locomotive roster ==
Unit no.	Builder	Model	Serial no.	Build date	Former nos.	Acquired	Retired	Notes
STMA 37	EMD	SD38	34881	4/1969	ex DSRC 37; ex MCR 37			to STMA 37
SSOR 75	GE	70ton	29090	9/1947	ex SSOR 75; ex Iowa Terminal 75; nee Marianna & Blountstown 75			scrapped 2022
76	GE	70Ton	31726	1953	ex Iowa Terminal 76; nee TS 743			scrapped 2022
77	GE	70Ton	30841	2/1951	ex SSOR 77; nee Hampton & Branchville 70			scrapped 2021
103	Alco	S3	79774	5/1952	ex SSOR 103, 1988; ex KEWH 103, 1983; ex COP 103, 1968; ex ONW 102; nee Brooks-Scanlon Lumber 102 (Bend, OR)	1989		scrapped 2021
213	ALCo	C420	84784	4/1964	ex NACC 213; ex VAMD 213; nee LI 213		2021	to AM 69
506	EMD	SD9	18777	1/1954	ex WSOR 506; ex MILW 506; ex MILW 538; nee MILW 2232			scrapped 2021
512	EMD	SD7	16941	6/1952	ex MILW 512; nee MILW 2212			scrapped 2023
522	EMD	SD7	18308	10/1953	ex WSOR 522; ex MILW 522; nee MILW 2222		2021	scrapped 2021
719	EMD	GP30	28339	6/1963	ex WC 719; nee SOO 719	2002		for parts only, scrapped
OVRR 1362	EMD	GP7u	16370	5/1952	ex OVRR 1362; ex BNSF 1362; ex ATSF 2217; nee ATSF GP7 2726:1			
NPR 2288	EMD	GP9	22852	3/1957	ex NPR 2288; ex KSW 4544; nee GTW 4544			
2891	EMD	SD40T-2	756046-7	7/1975	ex DSRC/WIR 2891; ex WIR 2891; ex WIR/WRIX 2891; ex EWG/WRIX 2891; ex WRIX 2891; ex UP 2891; ex UP 8619; nee DRGW 5362	2019	2021	to RWRR/WAMX 4275
3000	EMD	SD40-2	7334-42	2/1972	ex DSRC/WIR 3000; ex WIR 3000; ex WIR/WRIX 3000; ex WRIX 3000; ex EWG/WRIX 3000; ex USRC 3000; ex LTEX 3000; ex UP 3164	2019	2021	to RWRR/WAMX 4272
BGCM 3003	EMD	GP30m	28502	8/1963	ex OVRR/BGCM 3003; ex FWRY 3003; ex ARZC 3003; ex OHCR 4220; ex CSXT 4220; nee CO 3026			to BGCM 3003
DLCX 3138	EMD	SD40M-2	32800	4/1967	ex CEFX 3131; ex SP SD45R 7453; nee SP SD45 8886		2020	to CHS/DLCX 3138
4427	EMD	SD9E	19988	4/1955	ex SP 4427; ex SP SD9 3901; nee SP 5423			scrapped 2023
UP 6925	EMD	DDA40X	35499	6/1970	ex UP 6925	1987		for parts only; to MOPX 6925.
8308	EMD	GP10	18821	5/1954	ex DSRC/DLCX 8308; ex GSR/DLCX 8308; ex DLCX 8308; ex CANX 8308; ex PAL 8308; ex PAL 8103; ex ICG 8103; ex IC GP9 9024		2021	to RWRR/WAMX 1054
BGCM 9970	EMD	GP40	30960	12/1965	ex BGCM 9970; ex MJRX 9970; ex NREX 9970; ex UP 9970; ex UP 698; ex CNW 5513; ex CR 3023; ex PC 3023; nee NYC 3023		2021	to OVRR/BGCM 9970

== Controversy ==
In December 2017, Dakota Southern Railway was found to have stored rail cars full of liquid natural gas, more commonly known as butane, on a siding at the South Dakota Wheat Growers facility in Kennebec. A federal inspection found that they had been sitting there far too long, and cited 11 counts of hazardous material violations.

Further investigation found that Mike Willams, one of the co-owners of Dakota Southern, had signed a contract giving away 1.4 miles of siding to Bruce Terminaling LLC, a company that Mike Willams also owns. This contract was not presented to the South Dakota State Rail Board, and due to this, a discussion about terminating the lease of Dakota Southern on the Rapid City–Mitchell (MRC) line came about, but this never came to fruition.
