= Grass Creek =

Grass Creek may refer to:

- Grass Creek, Indiana, an unincorporated community
- Grass Creek, Utah, a ghost town
- Grass Creek, Wyoming, an unincorporated community
- Grass Creek (Black Lake), New York, a stream
- Grass Creek (South Dakota), a stream
