= Ringneck and Western Railroad =

Railroad in South Dakota, United States

Overview
- Parent company: Watco
- Reporting mark: RWRR
- Locale: South Dakota
- Dates of operation: 2021–Present
- Predecessor: Dakota Southern Railway

Technical
- Track gauge: 4 ft 8 1/2 in (1,435 mm)
- Length: 108 miles (174 km)

The Ringneck & Western Railroad (reporting mark RWRR), a subsidiary of Watco, is a railroad that began operations in late May 2021 over 108 miles (174 km) of former Dakota Southern Railway track between Mitchell and Presho, South Dakota. The railroad was formed after Watco purchased the 189.7 miles (305.3 km) of track between Mitchell and Kadoka, South Dakota from the state of South Dakota in 2021. The line beyond Presho is out of service with the US Hwy 83 expressway crossing having been removed in the early 2000s during the years that the line was used only for car storage beyond Mitchell.

== History ==
The line is part of a former Chicago, Milwaukee, St. Paul and Pacific Railroad (CMStP&P), better known as the Milwaukee Road, secondary built between Marquette, Iowa and Rapid City, South Dakota between 1880 and 1907. In the 1980s, at the risk of Milwaukee Road abandoning the line, the line was embargoed and subsequently purchased by the South Dakota Department of Transportation, which sold the line to Watco in 2021 for $13,000,000. The Dakota Southern Railway, first under the ownership of brothers Alex and Dick Huff and later Mike Williams and Stan Patterson, from the late 1980s to 2021 operated and between 2011 and 2016 rehabilitated the line as far as Presho with Federal TIGER Grants plus state funding. Track beyond Kadoka to Rapid City has been removed.

== Traffic ==
According to Watco traffic consists mainly of grain, fertilizer, and paper products to or from the shuttle loading elevators near Presho, Kennebec, Kimball and a folding carton plant in Mitchell. Between 10,000 and 12,000 cars are handled annually, primarily shuttle trains interchanging with BNSF in Mitchell.
