= Long Valley =

Long Valley may refer to:

- Long Valley (Antarctica)
- Long Valley Caldera in California
- Long Valley, California, former name of Greenwood, El Dorado County, California
- Long Valley, Hong Kong
- Long Valley, New Jersey
- Long Valley, South Dakota
- Long Valley, Hampshire, England
- Long Valley (Lake County, California)
- Long Valley (Nevada)
- Long Valley (Kane County, Utah), stretching along US-89 from Long Valley Junction (SR-14) south to Mt. Carmel Junction (SR-9)
