= Potato Creek, South Dakota =

Unincorporated community in South Dakota, U.S.

Coordinates: 43°32′04″N 101°59′25″W

Potato Creek (Lakota: Bloók'e) is an unincorporated community in Jackson County, in the U.S. state of South Dakota.

== History ==
A post office called Potato Creek was established in 1935, and remained in operation until 1962. The community was named after the creek of the same name.
