= Cactus Flat, South Dakota =

- Unincorporated community
- Location within South Dakota Location within the United States
- Coordinates: 43°50′08″N 101°53′40″W
- Country: United States
- State: South Dakota
- County: Jackson
- Elevation: 2,500 ft (760 m)
- Time zone: UTC-7 (Mountain (MST))
  - Summer (DST): UTC-6 (MDT)
- Area code: 605
- GNIS feature ID: 1261390

Cactus Flat (also Cactus Flat Junction, Cactus Flats) is an unincorporated community in Jackson County, South Dakota, United States. The community is home to several nearby campgrounds and prairie dog towns which are marketed as tourist attractions.

== Buildings ==
The Ranch Store building was originally located in Kadoka, South Dakota, but was later moved to Cactus Flat.

== See also ==
Prairie Homestead
