= Lost Dog =

Lost Dog or Lost Dogs may refer to:

- a lost pet, see Animal loss
- Lost Dog Creek, a steam in South Dakota
- Lost Dogs, a band
- "Lost Dog" (episode), a live-action episode in The Super Mario Bros. Super Show!
- Lost Dogs (album), an album by Pearl Jam
- The Lost Dog, a 2007 novel
