= Oak Creek (White River tributary) =

Stream in South Dakota, USA

Coordinates: 43°41′01″N 100°12′42″W

Oak Creek is a stream in the U.S. state of South Dakota. It is a tributary of the White River.

Oak Creek was named for the oak trees along its course.

== See also ==
- List of rivers of South Dakota
