= White Thunder Creek =

River in South Dakota, United States

White Thunder Creek Tributary to White River
- Location of White Thunder Creek mouth White Thunder Creek (the United States)
- Native name: Wakíŋyaŋ Ská Wakpála (Lakota)

Location
- Country: United States
- State: South Dakota
- County: Mellotte; Todd

Physical characteristics
- Source: Antelope Creek divide
  - location: about 7 miles northeast of Antelope, South Dakota
  - coordinates: 43°20′43″N 100°33′30″W
  - elevation: 2,760 ft (840 m)
- Mouth: White River
  - location: Riverside Township, South Dakota
  - coordinates: 43°43′06″N 100°25′38″W
  - elevation: 1,698 ft (518 m)
- Length: 42.14 mi (67.82 km)
- Basin size: 166.41 square miles (431.0 km^{2})
- Discharge
  - location: White River
  - average: 14.38 cu ft/s (0.407 m^{3}/s) at mouth with White River

Basin features
- Progression: north-northeast
- River system: Missouri
- Tributaries
  - left: unnamed tributaries
  - right: unnamed tributaries
- Bridges: Corn Road, Fox Road, Pure Water Road, White Thunder Road, Unnamed Road, 272nd Street, Unnamed Road (x3), SD 44, 282nd Avenue, Brave Boy Road

White Thunder Creek (Lakota: Wakíŋyaŋ Ská Wakpála) is a stream in the U.S. state of South Dakota.

White Thunder Creek has the name of White Thunder, an Indian chief.

== See also ==
- List of rivers of South Dakota
