= Mt. Moriah Masonic Lodge No. 155 =

- Mt. Moriah Masonic Lodge #155
- U.S. National Register of Historic Places
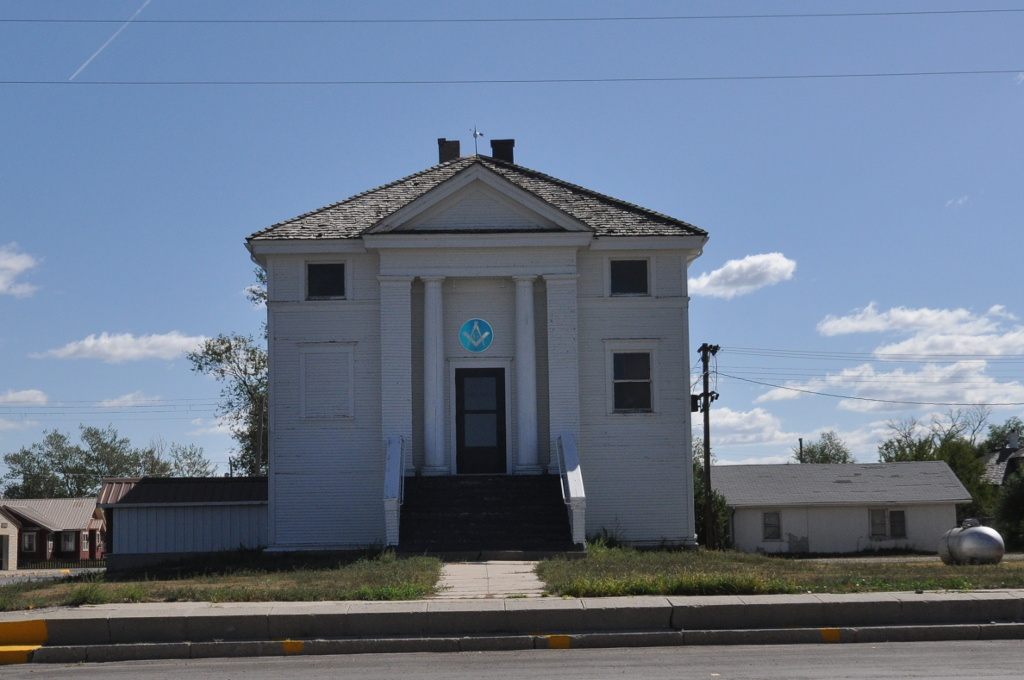

- Location within South Dakota Location within the United States
- Location: 101 Main St. S, Kadoka, South Dakota
- Coordinates: 43°50′11″N 101°30′35″W
- Area: less than one acre
- Built: 1917
- Architectural style: Classical Revival
- NRHP reference No.: 04000765
- Added to NRHP: July 28, 2004

The Mt. Moriah Masonic Temple is a historic building in Kadoka, South Dakota. It was constructed in 1917, as a meeting hall for Mt. Moriah Lodge No. 155 (a local area Masonic lodge). The building was listed on the National Register of Historic Places in 2004 as Mt. Moriah Masonic Lodge No. 155. It has also been known as the Kadoka Masonic Hall.

It has a two-story pedimented portico with Doric columns and pilasters.
