= Pearl Hotel =

- U.S. National Register of Historic Places
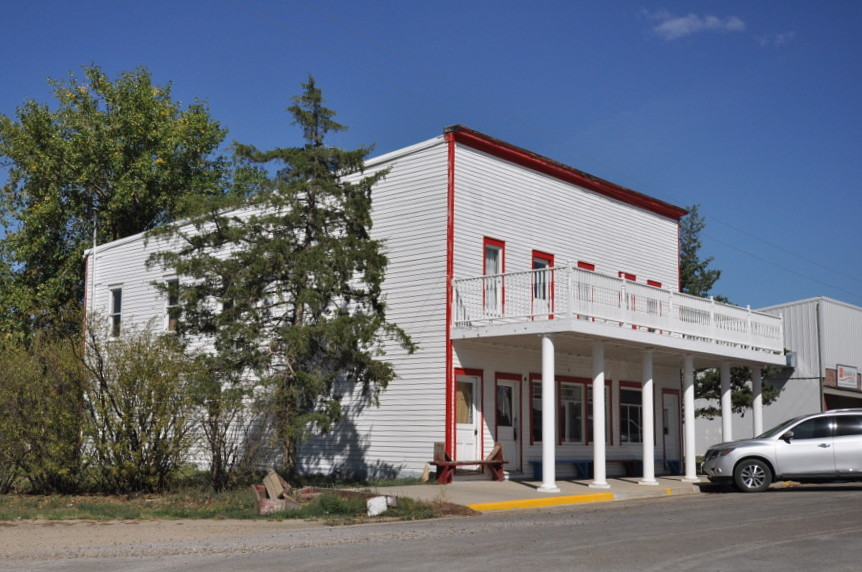

- Location within South Dakota Location within the United States
- Location: South Main, Kadoka, South Dakota
- Coordinates: 43°50′02″N 101°30′38″W
- Area: less than one acre
- Built: 1907
- NRHP reference No.: 07000587
- Added to NRHP: June 14, 2007

The Pearl Hotel, located on South Main in Kadoka, South Dakota, was built in 1907. It was listed on the National Register of Historic Places in 2007.

It was built for J.A. Jones and his wife Minnie in 1907 after the town was established in 1906 and a Chicago, Milwaukee, St. Paul and Pacific Railroad train depot was built in 1907. It was the only restaurant and hotel in the town. The Joneses operated it until 1924.
