= Kenneth B. Jones =

American politician

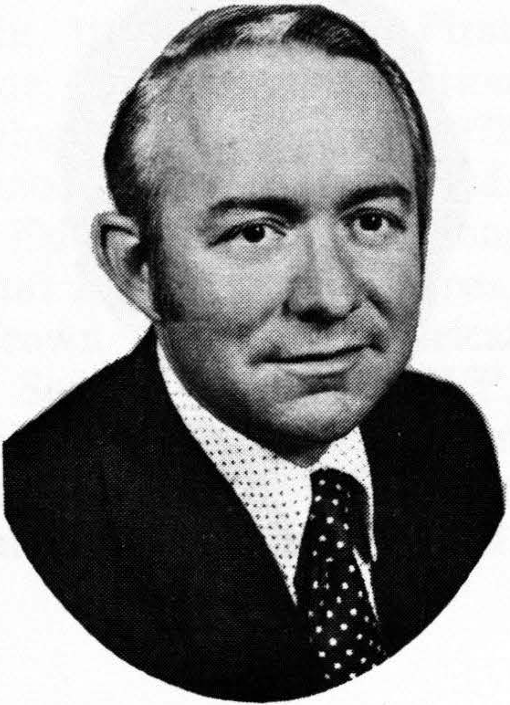
- Jones in 1975

Member of the South Dakota Senate from Yankton County
- In office 1975–1978
- Preceded by: Don A. Bierle
- Succeeded by: Carrol V. Allen

Personal details
- Born: March 26, 1930 (age 96) Presho, South Dakota, U.S.
- Party: Republican
- Spouse: Loretta Aisenbrey
- Education: South Dakota State University

Kenneth B. Jones (born March 26, 1930) is an American politician. A member of the Republican Party, he served in the South Dakota Senate from 1975 to 1978.

== Life and career ==
Jones was born in Presho, South Dakota, the son of John Jones. He attended Presho High School, graduating in 1948. After graduating, he attended South Dakota State University, earning his BS degree in pharmacy, which after earning his degree, he served in the United States Army. After his discharge, he worked as a pharmacist.

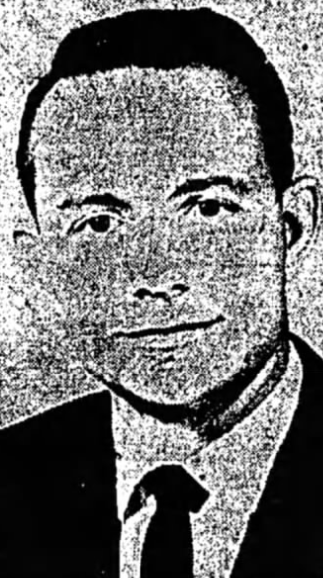
Jones in 1961

Jones served in the South Dakota Senate from 1975 to 1978.
