= Long Valley, South Dakota =

- Unincorporated community
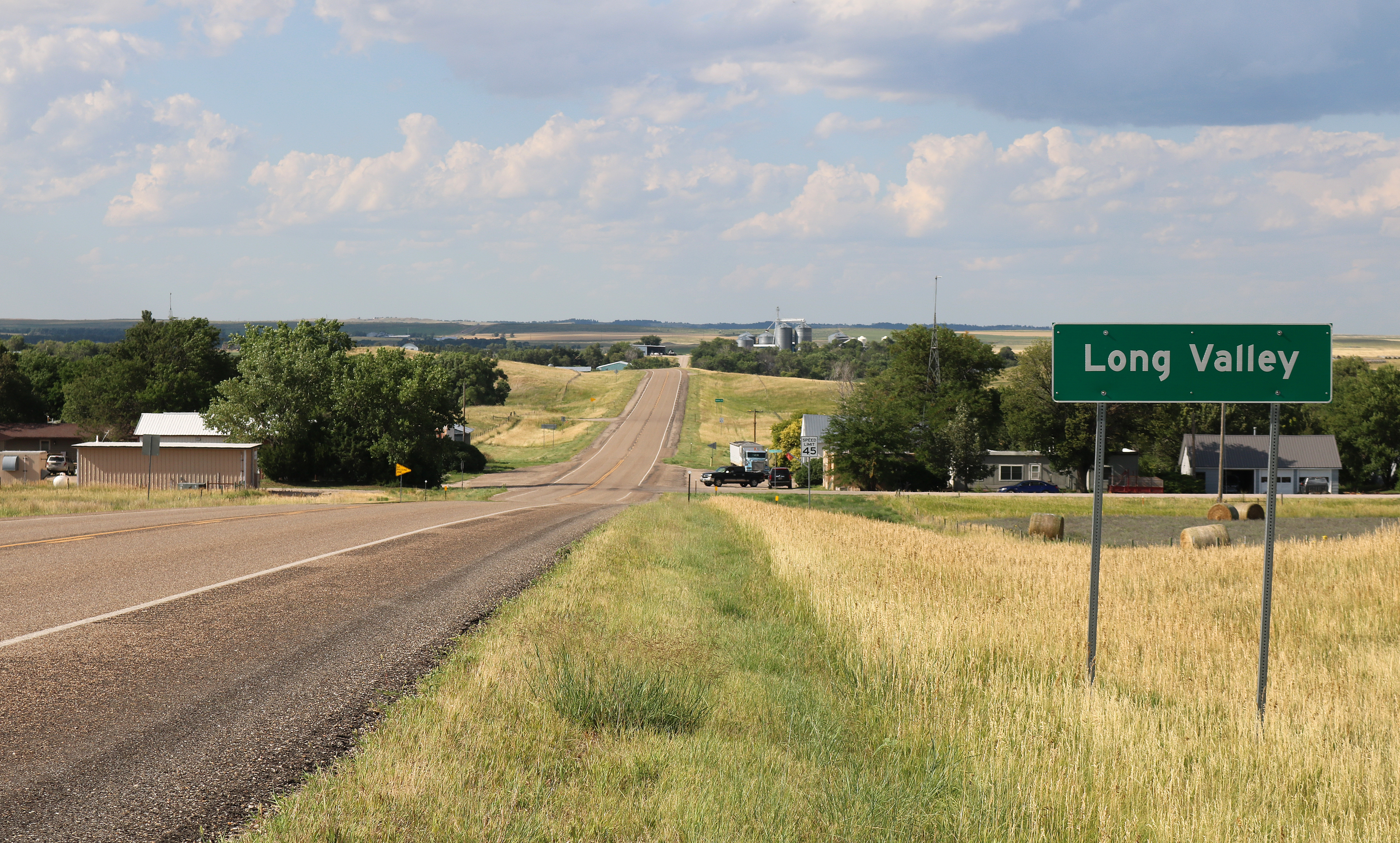
- Looking north along Highway 73

- Location within South Dakota Location within the United States
- Coordinates: 43°27′42″N 101°29′40″W
- Country: United States
- State: South Dakota
- County: Jackson
- Time zone: UTC-6 (Central (CST))
  - Summer (DST): UTC-5 (CDT)
- ZIP codes: 57547
- Area code: 605

Long Valley (also Longvalley) is an unincorporated community in Jackson County, South Dakota, United States. Long Valley has been assigned the ZIP code of 57547.

The town site is located in a long valley. It is a low basin valley that covers 21 miles (34 km) long by 6 miles (10 km) wide.
