= Craven Creek =

Stream in South Dakota, US

Coordinates: 43°41′37″N 101°43′11″W

Craven Creek is a stream in the U.S. state of South Dakota.

Craven Creek has the name of Gus Craven, a cattleman.

== See also ==
- List of rivers of South Dakota
