= Butch Creek =

Stream in South Dakota, United States

Coordinates: 43°45′33″N 100°50′21″W

Butch Creek is a stream in the U.S. state of South Dakota.

Butch Creek has the name of Charles "Butch" Benard, an early settler.

== See also ==
- List of rivers of South Dakota
