= Cottonwood, South Dakota =

Town in the United States

- Town
- Location in Jackson County and the state of South Dakota
- Coordinates: 43°57′57″N 101°54′07″W
- Country: United States
- State: South Dakota
- County: Jackson
- Incorporated: 1906

Area
  - Total: 0.92 sq mi (2.38 km^{2})
  - Land: 0.92 sq mi (2.38 km^{2})
  - Water: 0 sq mi (0.00 km^{2})
- Elevation: 2,415 ft (736 m)

Population (2020)
  - Total: 12
  - Density: 13.1/sq mi (5.05/km^{2})
- Time zone: UTC-7 (Mountain (MST))
  - Summer (DST): UTC-6 (MDT)
- Area code: 605
- FIPS code: 46-14220
- GNIS feature ID: 1267339

Cottonwood is a town in Jackson County, South Dakota, United States. The population was 12 at the 2020 census.

== History ==
Cottonwood was originally named Ingham, and under the latter name was laid out in 1906. The present name comes from Cottonwood Creek.

Residents voted 7 to 4 in 2016 opposing dissolution of the town.

== Geography ==
According to the United States Census Bureau, the town has a total area of 0.92 square miles (2.38 km^{2}), all land.

== Climate ==
Climate data for Cottonwood 2 E, South Dakota (1991–2020 normals, extremes 1909–present)
Month	Jan	Feb	Mar	Apr	May	Jun	Jul	Aug	Sep	Oct	Nov	Dec	Year
Record high °F (°C)	80 (27)	80 (27)	88 (31)	95 (35)	105 (41)	114 (46)	117 (47)	113 (45)	108 (42)	98 (37)	85 (29)	77 (25)	117 (47)
Mean maximum °F (°C)	58.4 (14.7)	63.1 (17.3)	76.3 (24.6)	83.7 (28.7)	90.9 (32.7)	98.0 (36.7)	103.8 (39.9)	103.6 (39.8)	100.1 (37.8)	88.3 (31.3)	72.8 (22.7)	60.5 (15.8)	105.5 (40.8)
Mean daily maximum °F (°C)	33.1 (0.6)	37.0 (2.8)	47.6 (8.7)	57.8 (14.3)	68.3 (20.2)	79.4 (26.3)	88.2 (31.2)	87.6 (30.9)	78.2 (25.7)	61.8 (16.6)	47.1 (8.4)	35.7 (2.1)	60.2 (15.7)
Daily mean °F (°C)	20.6 (−6.3)	23.8 (−4.6)	34.0 (1.1)	43.9 (6.6)	55.1 (12.8)	66.0 (18.9)	73.7 (23.2)	71.7 (22.1)	61.6 (16.4)	46.6 (8.1)	33.2 (0.7)	23.0 (−5.0)	46.1 (7.8)
Mean daily minimum °F (°C)	8.1 (−13.3)	10.5 (−11.9)	20.4 (−6.4)	30.0 (−1.1)	42.0 (5.6)	52.7 (11.5)	59.2 (15.1)	55.8 (13.2)	45.0 (7.2)	31.3 (−0.4)	19.2 (−7.1)	10.2 (−12.1)	32.0 (0.0)
Mean minimum °F (°C)	−16.9 (−27.2)	−13.8 (−25.4)	−1.9 (−18.8)	13.2 (−10.4)	25.3 (−3.7)	39.9 (4.4)	47.0 (8.3)	42.8 (6.0)	30.2 (−1.0)	12.7 (−10.7)	−0.9 (−18.3)	−12.4 (−24.7)	−23.4 (−30.8)
Record low °F (°C)	−42 (−41)	−43 (−42)	−33 (−36)	−12 (−24)	13 (−11)	30 (−1)	34 (1)	27 (−3)	10 (−12)	−14 (−26)	−29 (−34)	−41 (−41)	−43 (−42)
Average precipitation inches (mm)	0.41 (10)	0.56 (14)	1.03 (26)	1.96 (50)	2.90 (74)	3.09 (78)	2.10 (53)	1.63 (41)	1.22 (31)	1.46 (37)	0.54 (14)	0.48 (12)	17.38 (441)
Average snowfall inches (cm)	5.4 (14)	6.3 (16)	6.3 (16)	6.8 (17)	0.4 (1.0)	0.0 (0.0)	0.0 (0.0)	0.0 (0.0)	0.0 (0.0)	2.2 (5.6)	4.8 (12)	6.0 (15)	38.2 (97)
Average precipitation days (≥ 0.01 in)	4.6	5.1	5.7	8.6	10.0	11.9	8.9	6.6	5.2	6.7	4.5	4.4	82.2
Average snowy days (≥ 0.1 in)	4.0	4.2	3.2	2.4	0.1	0.0	0.0	0.0	0.0	0.9	2.7	3.8	21.3
Source: NOAA

== Demographics ==
Historical population
Census	Pop.	Note	%±
1920	121		—
1930	191		57.9%
1940	118		−38.2%
1950	102		−13.6%
1960	38		−62.7%
1970	16		−57.9%
1980	4		−75.0%
1990	12		200.0%
2000	6		−50.0%
2010	9		50.0%
2020	12		33.3%
U.S. Decennial Census; 2012 Estimate

=== 2010 census ===
As of the census of 2010, there were 9 people, 6 households, and 3 families residing in the town. The population density was 9.8 inhabitants per square mile (3.8/km^{2}). There were 9 housing units at an average density of 9.8 per square mile (3.8/km^{2}). The racial makeup of the town was 88.9% White and 11.1% Native American.

There were 6 households, of which 33.3% were married couples living together, 16.7% had a male householder with no wife present, and 50.0% were non-families. 50.0% of all households were made up of individuals, and 16.7% had someone living alone who was 65 years of age or older. The average household size was 1.50 and the average family size was 2.00.

The median age in the town was 60.8 years. 0.0% of residents were under the age of 18; 11.1% were between the ages of 18 and 24; 0.0% were from 25 to 44; 55.5% were from 45 to 64; and 33.3% were 65 years of age or older. The gender makeup of the town was 66.7% male and 33.3% female.

=== 2000 census ===
As of the census of 2000, there were 6 people, 4 households, and 2 families residing in the town. The population density was 6.5 people per square mile (2.5/km^{2}). There were 5 housing units at an average density of 5.4 per square mile (2.1/km^{2}). The racial makeup of the town was 100.00% White.

There were 4 households, out of which none had children under the age of 18 living with them, 50.0% were married couples living together, and 50.0% were non-families. 50.0% of all households were made up of individuals, and 50.0% had someone living alone who was 65 years of age or older. The average household size was 1.50 and the average family size was 2.00.

In the town, the population was spread out, with 33.3% from 45 to 64, and 66.7% who were 65 years of age or older. The median age was 66 years. For every 100 females, there were 100.0 males. For every 100 females age 18 and over, there were 100.0 males.

The median income for a household in the town was $75,487, and the median income for a family was $0. Males had a median income of $0 versus $0 for females. The per capita income for the town was $79,000. None of the population or families were below the poverty line.
