= Potato Creek (White River tributary) =

Stream in South Dakota, United States

Coordinates: 43°41′19″N 102°02′04″W

Potato Creek is a stream in the U.S. state of South Dakota. It is a tributary of the White River.

Potato Creek was so named on account of the wild potatoes Indians harvested as a food source along the creek's course.

== See also ==
- List of rivers of South Dakota
