= Roundup Creek =

Stream in South Dakota, U.S.

Coordinates: 43°46′46″N 100°52′20″W

Roundup Creek is a stream in the U.S. state of South Dakota.

Roundup Creek was frequently the origin point of a roundup of cattle, hence the name.

== See also ==
- List of rivers of South Dakota
