= Ozark Valley Railroad =

Overview
- Reporting mark: OVRR
- Locale: Missouri
- Dates of operation: 2007–

Technical
- Track gauge: 4 ft 8 1/2 in (1,435 mm) standard gauge

The Ozark Valley Railroad is a 27-mile shortline railroad connecting Arthur Spur, Missouri and Fulton, Missouri. The railroad was founded in 2007 to take over for Kansas City Southern (KCS) in the 22 mile track between Mexico, Missouri and Fulton, Missouri.

== Connection ==
The Kansas City Southern Railway links to the Ozark Valley Railroad at Mexico, Missouri.

== Motive Power ==
- EMD GP7 #1362
