= Kadoka station =

Kadoka
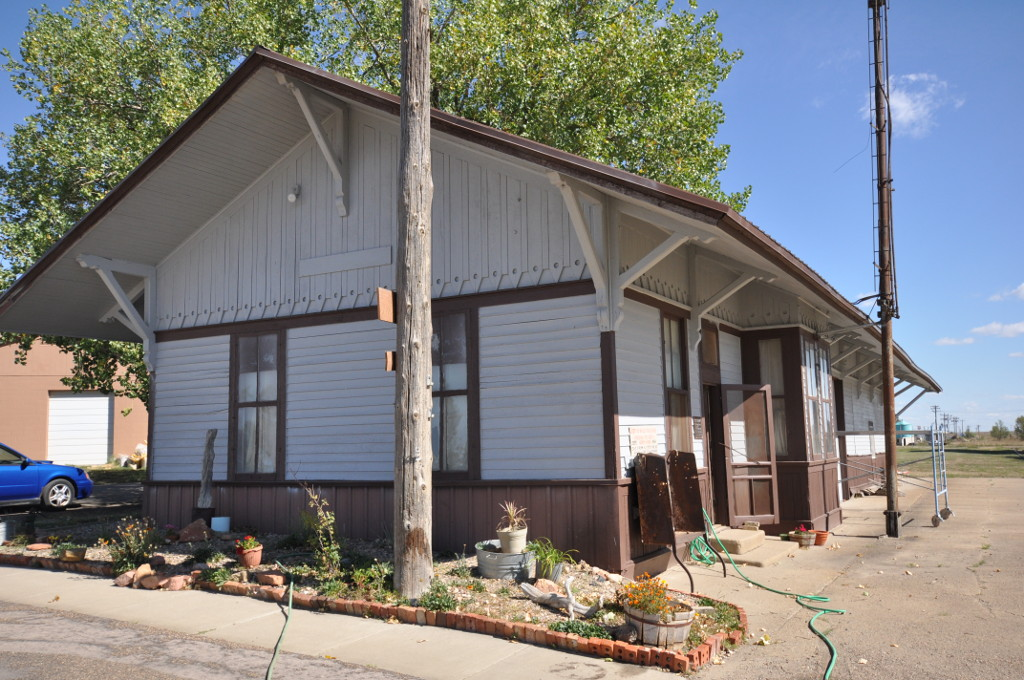

General information
- Location: 805 Railway Street, Kadoka, South Dakota 57543
- System: Former Milwaukee Road passenger rail station

History
- Rebuilt: 1906

Services
Preceding station	Milwaukee Road	Following station
Interior toward Rapid City	Rapid City – Madison	Belvidere toward Madison
- Chicago, Milwaukee, and St. Paul Railroad Depot
- U.S. National Register of Historic Places
- Location within South Dakota
- Location: South end of Kadoka, South Dakota business district
- Coordinates: 43°49′56″N 101°30′34″W
- Built: 1906
- Architect: Chicago, Milwaukee, St. Paul and Pacific Railroad
- NRHP reference No.: 86001478
- Added to NRHP: August 13, 1986
Location

The Chicago, Milwaukee, and St. Paul Railroad Depot in Kadoka, South Dakota, United States, is a rectangular, single story, wood-frame building built by the Chicago, Milwaukee, St. Paul and Pacific Railroad (otherwise known as the Milwaukee Road) in 1906 during the railroad's expansion across South Dakota from Sioux Falls to Rapid City in 1906–07. The depot was built to handle passenger and freight traffic as well as agricultural products. When the railroad went out of business in the mid-1980s, the depot was bought by the Kadoka Community Betterment Association and converted into a museum showcasing artifacts and life on the South Dakota prairie.

The depot was listed in the National Register of Historic Places because of its association with the development of railroads in South Dakota.
