= Eagle Nest Creek =

Stream in South Dakota, U.S.

Coordinates: 43°41′42.97″N 101°46′10.52″W

Eagle Nest Creek is a stream in the U.S. state of South Dakota.

Eagle Nest Creek was named for the fact eagles nested near its course.

== See also ==
- List of rivers of South Dakota
