= Prairie Homestead =

Historic house in South Dakota, United States

- U.S. National Register of Historic Places
- U.S. Historic district
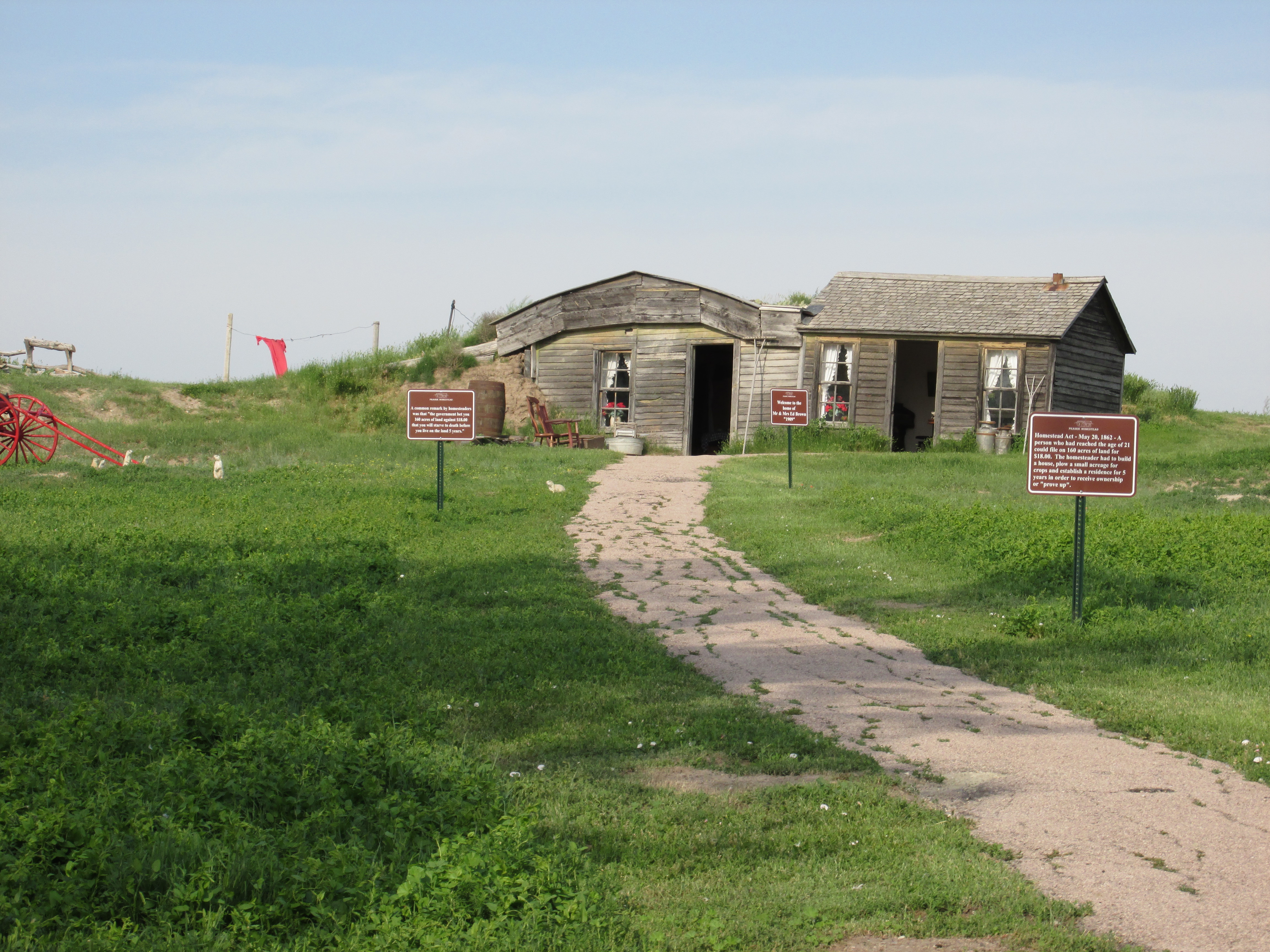
- Prairie Homestead, 21070 South Dakota Highway 240 Interior, South Dakota, U.S.A. - located to the northeast of Badlands National Park

- Location within South Dakota Location within the United States
- Interactive map showing the location of Prairie Homestead
- Location: 21070 South Dakota Highway 240
- Nearest city: Interior, South Dakota
- Coordinates: 43°48′04″N 101°54′23″W
- Area: 100 acres (40 ha)
- Built: 1909
- NRHP reference No.: 74001891
- Added to NRHP: January 11, 1974

The Prairie Homestead is a sod house located at 21070 South Dakota Highway 240 north of Interior, South Dakota. The house was constructed by Ed Brown and his wife in 1909. The Browns built their home with sod bricks and topped it with a grass roof. Western South Dakota was one of the last regions of the state to be settled by homesteaders, and the house is now one of the few remaining sod homes in the state. The home is now open to visitors for tours and houses farm animals and prairie dogs on its grounds.

The house was added to the National Register of Historic Places on January 11, 1974.
