= Lost Dog Creek =

Stream in South Dakota, U.S.

Coordinates: 43°41′30″N 101°55′37″W

Lost Dog Creek is a stream in the U.S. state of South Dakota.

Some say Lost Dog Creek was named from an incident when a dog ran away from a nearby settlement, while others believe the name recalls an incident when an Indian heard a lost dog howling near the creek.

== See also ==
- List of rivers of South Dakota
