= Grass Creek (South Dakota) =

Stream in South Dakota, U.S.

Coordinates: 43°24′49″N 102°35′35″W

Grass Creek is a stream in the U.S. state of South Dakota.

Grass Creek's name comes from the Sioux Indians of the area, for the thick grass along the stream's watercourse.

== See also ==
- List of rivers of South Dakota
