= Jackson County, South Dakota =

County in South Dakota, United States

- County
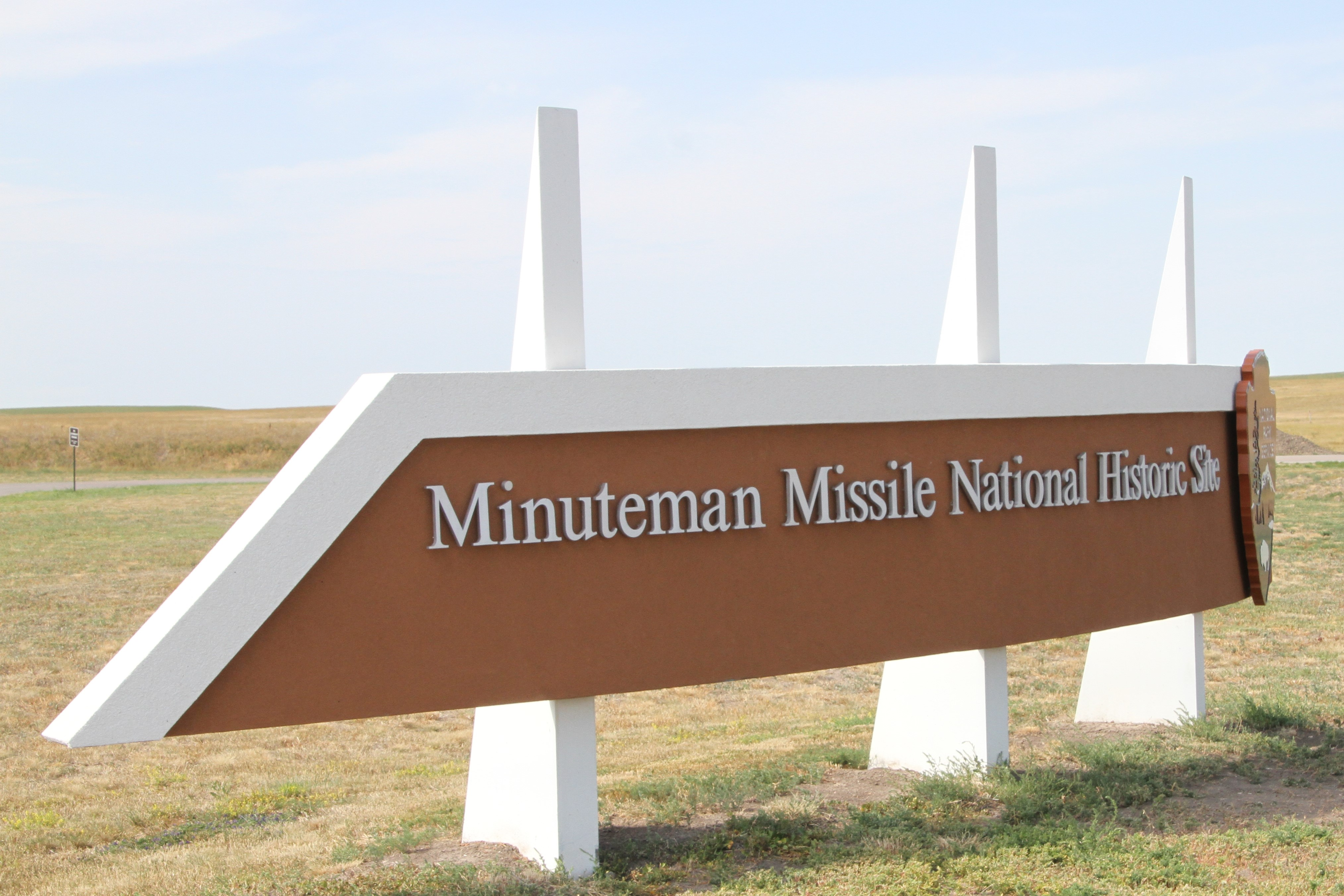
- Minuteman Missile National Historic Site

- Location within the U.S. state of South Dakota
- Coordinates: 43°42′N 101°38′W
- Country: United States
- State: South Dakota
- Created: 1883
- Organized: 1915
- Seat: Kadoka
- Largest community: Kadoka

Area
  - Total: 1,871 sq mi (4,850 km^{2})
  - Land: 1,864 sq mi (4,830 km^{2})
  - Water: 7.4 sq mi (19 km^{2}) 0.4%

Population (2020)
  - Total: 2,806
  - Estimate (2025): 2,666 ▼
  - Density: 1.505/sq mi (0.5812/km^{2})
- Time zone: UTC−7 (Mountain)
  - Summer (DST): UTC−6 (MDT)
- Congressional district: At-large
- Washabaugh County was merged into Jackson County in 1983

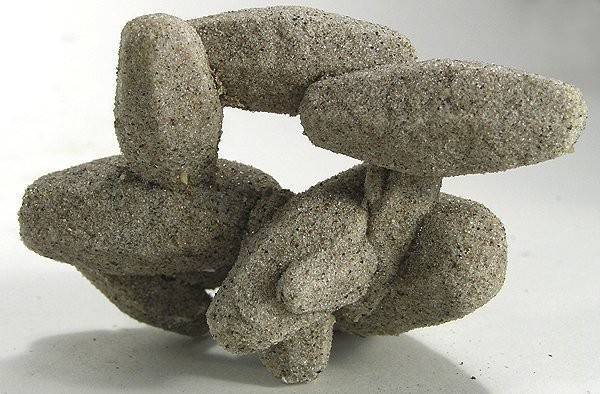
An unusual specimen of calcite, densely intergrown with grains of sand. Collected from Rattlesnake Butte in Jackson County. Size: 6.9 x 5.4 x 3.9 cm.

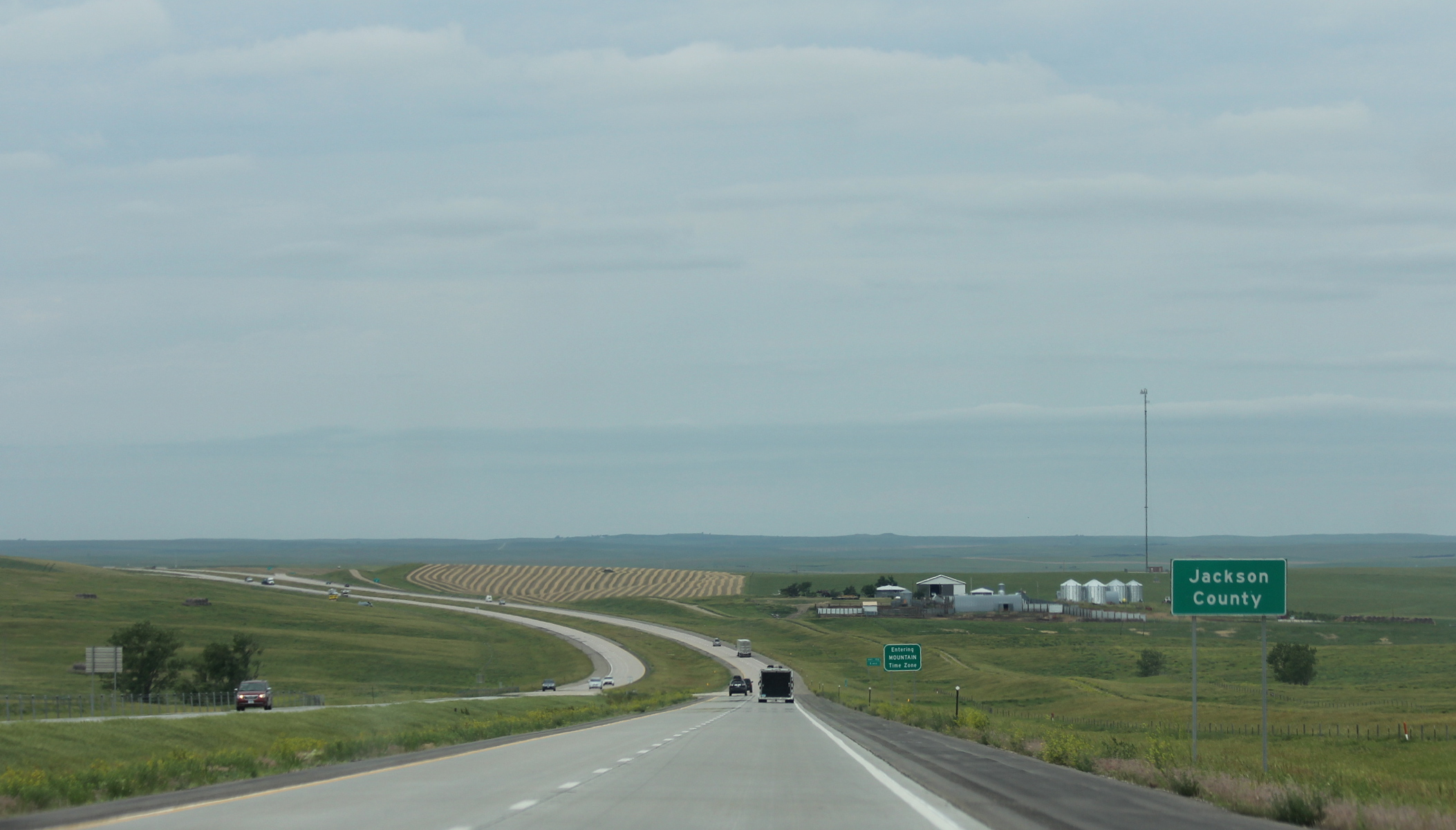
Jackson County sign on Interstate 90

Jackson County is a county in the U.S. state of South Dakota. As of the 2020 census, the population was 2,806. Its county seat is Kadoka. The county was created in 1883, and was organized in 1915. Washabaugh County was merged into Jackson County in 1983.

== Geography ==
The terrain of Jackson County consists of mountains rising from rolling hills. The ground is arid and carved with drainages. The White River flows eastward, cutting a meandering channel through the central part. The terrain generally slopes to the NE; its highest point is a ridge near the SW corner, at 3,274 ft (998 m) ASL.

Jackson County has a total area of 1,871 square miles (4,850 km^{2}), of which 1,864 square miles (4,830 km^{2}) is land and 7.4 square miles (19 km^{2}) (0.4%) is water. About 57 percent of its land, the portion south of White River, is on the Pine Ridge Indian Reservation. The county includes the easternmost portion of Badlands National Park.

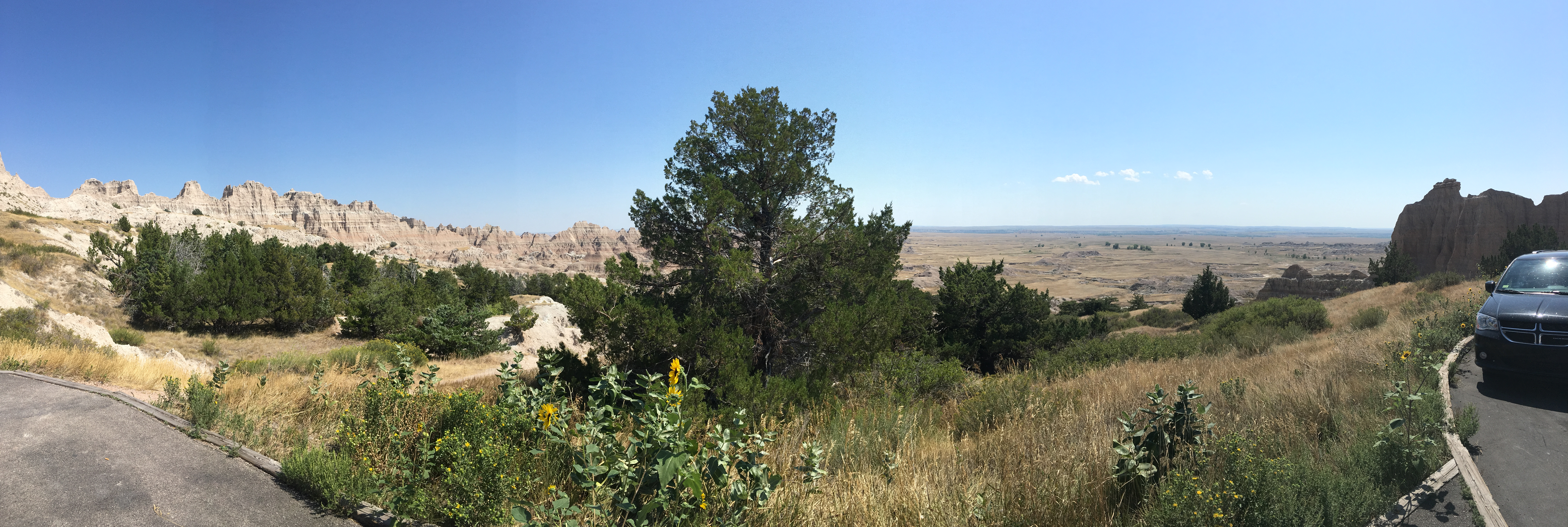
Badlands National Park near Interior

South Dakota's eastern counties (48 of 66) observe Central Time; the western counties (18 of 66) observe Mountain Time. Jackson County is the easternmost of the state's counties to observe Mountain Time.

=== Major highways ===
- Interstate 90
- U.S. Highway 14
- South Dakota Highway 44
- South Dakota Highway 63
- South Dakota Highway 73
- South Dakota Highway 377

=== Adjacent counties ===
- Haakon County – north
- Jones County – northeast (observes Central Time)
- Mellette County – east (observes Central Time)
- Todd County – southeast (observes Central Time)
- Bennett County – south
- Oglala Lakota County – southwest
- Pennington County – northwest

=== Lakes ===
- Kadoka Lake
- Wanblee Lake

=== National protected areas ===
- Badlands National Park (part)
- Buffalo Gap National Grassland (part)
- Minuteman Missile National Historic Site (part)

== Demographics ==
Historical population
Census	Pop.	Note	%±
1920	2,472		—
1930	2,636		6.6%
1940	1,955		−25.8%
1950	1,768		−9.6%
1960	1,985		12.3%
1970	1,531		−22.9%
1980	3,437		124.5%
1990	2,811		−18.2%
2000	2,930		4.2%
2010	3,031		3.4%
2020	2,806		−7.4%
2025 (est.)	2,666	▼	−5.0%
U.S. Decennial Census; 1790–1960 1900–1990; 1990–2000 2010–2020

=== 2020 census ===
As of the 2020 census, the county had a population of 2,806. Of the residents, 31.8% were under the age of 18 and 14.9% were 65 years of age or older; the median age was 33.5 years. For every 100 females there were 101.6 males, and for every 100 females age 18 and over there were 98.2 males.

The population density was 1.5 inhabitants per square mile (0.58/km^{2}). There were 1,064 housing units, and there were 887 households, including 637 families residing in the county.

Of those households, 39.3% had children under the age of 18 living with them and 25.1% had a female householder with no spouse or partner present. About 24.7% of all households were made up of individuals and 10.1% had someone living alone who was 65 years of age or older.

The racial makeup of the county was 37.4% White, 0.4% Black or African American, 55.2% American Indian and Alaska Native, 0.2% Asian, 0.3% from some other race, and 6.4% from two or more races. Hispanic or Latino residents of any race comprised 2.2% of the population.

Of the 1,064 housing units, 16.6% were vacant. Among occupied housing units, 63.6% were owner-occupied and 36.4% were renter-occupied. The homeowner vacancy rate was 0.3% and the rental vacancy rate was 6.6%.

=== 2010 census ===
As of the 2010 census, there were 3,031 people, 996 households, and 703 families living in the county. The population density was 1.6 inhabitants per square mile (0.62/km^{2}). There were 1,193 housing units at an average density of 0.6 units per square mile (0.23 units/km^{2}). The racial makeup of the county was 52.0% American Indian, 42.7% white, 0.2% black or African American, 0.2% from other races, and 4.8% from two or more races. Those of Hispanic or Latino origin made up 1.3% of the population. In terms of ancestry, 20.7% were German, 12.3% were Irish, 10.1% were Norwegian, 5.7% were English, and 0.2% were American.

Of the 996 households, 40.2% had children under the age of 18 living with them, 45.8% were married couples living together, 16.2% had a female householder with no husband present, 29.4% were non-families, and 26.2% of all households were made up of individuals. The average household size was 3.00 and the average family size was 3.65. The median age was 31.5 years.

The median income for a household in the county was $36,354 and the median income for a family was $41,838. Males had a median income of $32,377 versus $25,000 for females. The per capita income for the county was $14,568. About 20.6% of families and 30.0% of the population were below the poverty line, including 35.9% of those under age 18 and 5.6% of those age 65 or over.

== Communities ==
=== City ===
- Kadoka (county seat) (Pop:543)

=== Towns ===
- Belvidere (Population:46)
- Cottonwood (Population:12)
- Interior (Population:65)

=== Census-designated place ===
- Wanblee (Population:674)

=== Unincorporated communities ===
- Cactus Flat
- Hisle
- Long Valley
- Potato Creek
- Stamford
- Weta

=== Townships ===
- Grandview II
- Interior
- Jewett
- Wall
- Weta

=== Unorganized territories ===
- East Jackson
- Northwest Jackson
- Southeast Jackson
- Southwest Jackson

== Politics ==
Jackson County voters have been reliably Republican for decades. In only one national election since 1936 has the county selected the Democratic Party candidate.

United States presidential election results for Jackson County, South Dakota
Year	Republican		Democratic		Third party(ies)	
Year	No.	%	No.	%	No.	%
1916	283	49.39%	279	48.69%	11	1.92%
1920	595	70.58%	206	24.44%	42	4.98%
1924	583	56.93%	194	18.95%	247	24.12%
1928	704	62.63%	417	37.10%	3	0.27%
1932	499	37.13%	812	60.42%	33	2.46%
1936	481	43.57%	593	53.71%	30	2.72%
1940	620	58.77%	435	41.23%	0	0.00%
1944	340	61.48%	213	38.52%	0	0.00%
1948	432	56.40%	321	41.91%	13	1.70%
1952	607	70.50%	254	29.50%	0	0.00%
1956	490	54.57%	408	45.43%	0	0.00%
1960	581	61.35%	366	38.65%	0	0.00%
1964	448	48.28%	480	51.72%	0	0.00%
1968	480	56.80%	267	31.60%	98	11.60%
1972	581	68.68%	261	30.85%	4	0.47%
1976	532	61.50%	313	36.18%	20	2.31%
1980	929	68.71%	354	26.18%	69	5.10%
1984	903	70.82%	365	28.63%	7	0.55%
1988	671	58.81%	450	39.44%	20	1.75%
1992	627	53.68%	351	30.05%	190	16.27%
1996	646	55.26%	423	36.18%	100	8.55%
2000	687	66.06%	319	30.67%	34	3.27%
2004	726	57.12%	508	39.97%	37	2.91%
2008	668	58.96%	435	38.39%	30	2.65%
2012	661	59.76%	426	38.52%	19	1.72%
2016	722	65.94%	323	29.50%	50	4.57%
2020	738	66.19%	359	32.20%	18	1.61%
2024	753	66.70%	357	31.62%	19	1.68%

== See also ==
- National Register of Historic Places listings in Jackson County, South Dakota
