= Presho, South Dakota =

- City
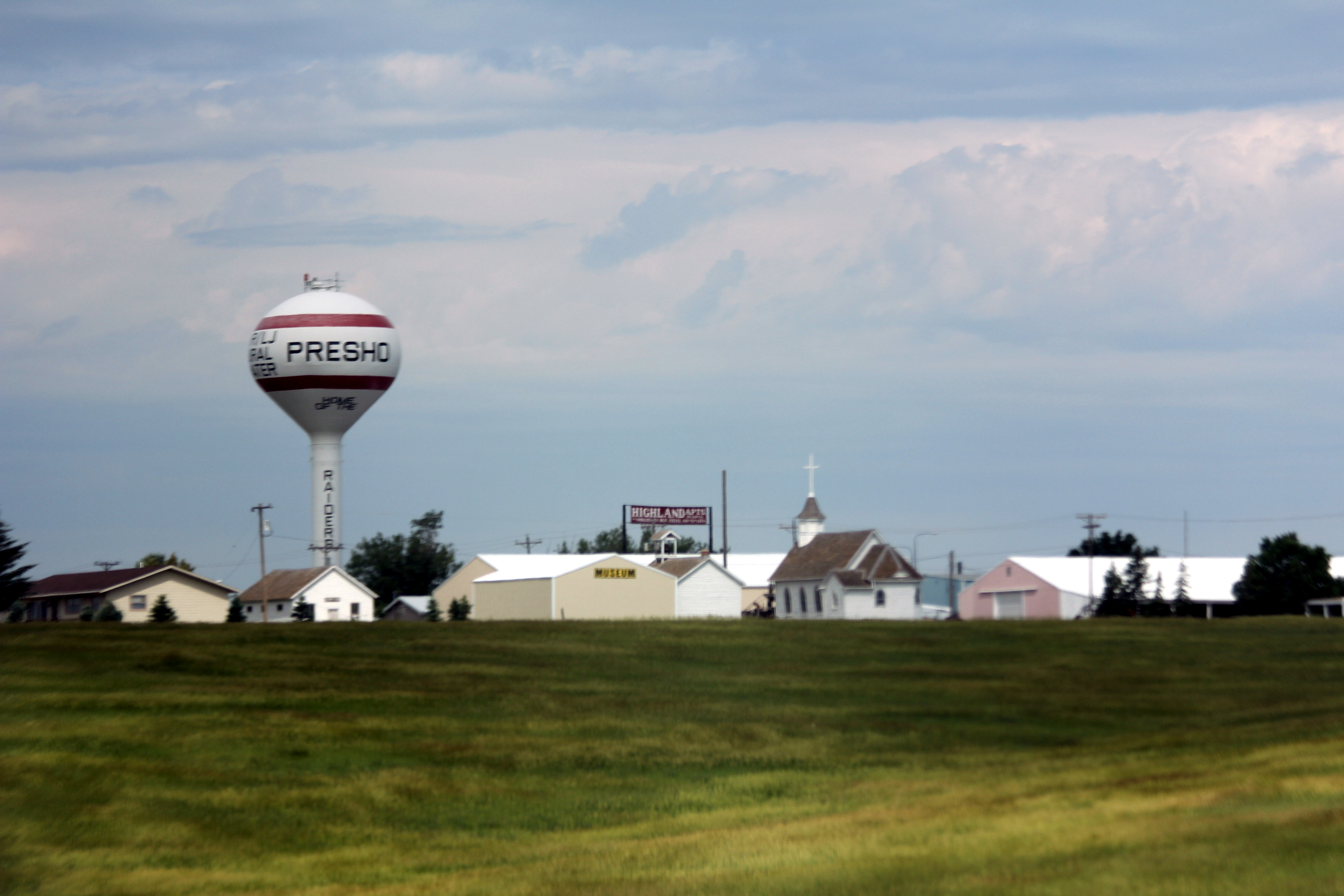
- Buildings in Presho

- Location in Lyman County and the state of South Dakota
- Coordinates: 43°54′26″N 100°03′30″W
- Country: United States
- State: South Dakota
- County: Lyman
- Incorporated: 1910

Area
  - Total: 0.67 sq mi (1.74 km^{2})
  - Land: 0.67 sq mi (1.74 km^{2})
  - Water: 0 sq mi (0.00 km^{2})
- Elevation: 1,788 ft (545 m)

Population (2020)
  - Total: 472
  - Density: 703.3/sq mi (271.53/km^{2})
- Time zone: UTC-6 (Central (CST))
  - Summer (DST): UTC-5 (CDT)
- ZIP code: 57568
- Area code: 605
- FIPS code: 46-51820
- GNIS feature ID: 1267537
- Website: cityofpresho.com

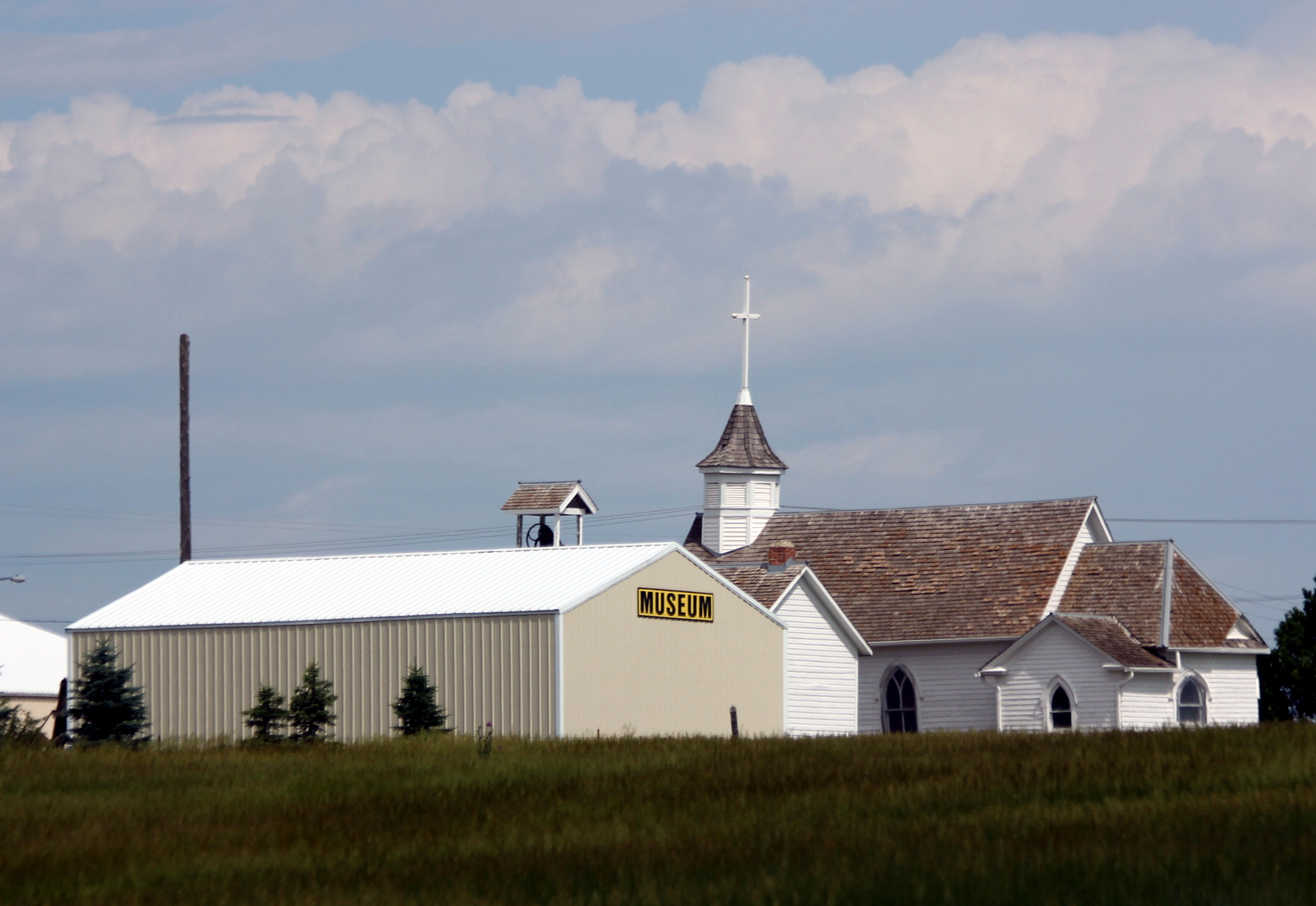
Church and Museum in Presho

Presho is a small city in Lyman County, South Dakota, United States. The population was 472 at the 2020 census.

== History ==
Presho was laid out in 1905, and named in honor of J. S. Presho, a cattleman.

== Geography ==
According to the United States Census Bureau, the city has a total area of 0.67 square miles (1.74 km^{2}), all land.

== Demographics ==
Historical population
Census	Pop.	Note	%±
1910	635		—
1920	626		−1.4%
1930	487		−22.2%
1940	568		16.6%
1950	712		25.4%
1960	881		23.7%
1970	922		4.7%
1980	760		−17.6%
1990	654		−13.9%
2000	588		−10.1%
2010	497		−15.5%
2020	472		−5.0%
U.S. Decennial Census

=== 2020 census ===
As of the 2020 census, Presho had a population of 472. The median age was 45.2 years. 22.5% of residents were under the age of 18 and 22.2% of residents were 65 years of age or older. For every 100 females there were 107.9 males, and for every 100 females age 18 and over there were 102.2 males age 18 and over.

0.0% of residents lived in urban areas, while 100.0% lived in rural areas.

There were 206 households in Presho, of which 20.9% had children under the age of 18 living in them. Of all households, 38.3% were married-couple households, 25.7% were households with a male householder and no spouse or partner present, and 29.6% were households with a female householder and no spouse or partner present. About 45.1% of all households were made up of individuals and 23.3% had someone living alone who was 65 years of age or older.

There were 264 housing units, of which 22.0% were vacant. The homeowner vacancy rate was 3.2% and the rental vacancy rate was 12.3%.

Racial composition as of the 2020 census
Race	Number	Percent
White	415	87.9%
Black or African American	1	0.2%
American Indian and Alaska Native	22	4.7%
Asian	0	0.0%
Native Hawaiian and Other Pacific Islander	0	0.0%
Some other race	3	0.6%
Two or more races	31	6.6%
Hispanic or Latino (of any race)	4	0.8%

=== 2010 census ===
As of the census of 2010, there were 497 people, 232 households, and 136 families residing in the city. The population density was 741.8 inhabitants per square mile (286.4/km^{2}). There were 285 housing units at an average density of 425.4 per square mile (164.2/km^{2}). The racial makeup of the city was 95.8% White, 2.4% Native American, 0.2% from other races, and 1.6% from two or more races. Hispanic or Latino of any race were 0.2% of the population.

There were 232 households, of which 24.6% had children under the age of 18 living with them, 46.6% were married couples living together, 7.8% had a female householder with no husband present, 4.3% had a male householder with no wife present, and 41.4% were non-families. 39.2% of all households were made up of individuals, and 15.5% had someone living alone who was 65 years of age or older. The average household size was 2.14 and the average family size was 2.88.

The median age in the city was 46.5 years. 22.7% of residents were under the age of 18; 5.9% were between the ages of 18 and 24; 18.8% were from 25 to 44; 32.2% were from 45 to 64; and 20.1% were 65 years of age or older. The gender makeup of the city was 51.3% male and 48.7% female.

=== 2000 census ===
As of the census of 2000, there were 588 people, 251 households, and 169 families residing in the city. The population density was 901.0 inhabitants per square mile (347.9/km^{2}). There were 305 housing units at an average density of 467.4 per square mile (180.5/km^{2}). The racial makeup of the city was 96.09% White, 0.34% African American, 1.36% Native American, 0.85% Asian, and 1.36% from two or more races. Hispanic or Latino of any race were 0.68% of the population.

There were 251 households, out of which 33.9% had children under the age of 18 living with them, 53.0% were married couples living together, 9.6% had a female householder with no husband present, and 32.3% were non-families. 29.9% of all households were made up of individuals, and 16.7% had someone living alone who was 65 years of age or older. The average household size was 2.34 and the average family size was 2.90.

In the city, the population was spread out, with 26.2% under the age of 18, 6.0% from 18 to 24, 26.4% from 25 to 44, 21.1% from 45 to 64, and 20.4% who were 65 years of age or older. The median age was 41 years. For every 100 females, there were 111.5 males. For every 100 females age 18 and over, there were 102.8 males.

The median income for a household in the city was $30,893, and the median income for a family was $38,250. Males had a median income of $22,500 versus $17,250 for females. The per capita income for the city was $15,789. About 11.2% of families and 11.2% of the population were below the poverty line, including 13.5% of those under age 18 and 15.8% of those age 65 or over.

== Notable people ==
- Kenneth B. Jones, South Dakota state senator
- Clint Roberts, U.S. representative from South Dakota
