= Kadoka, South Dakota =

- City
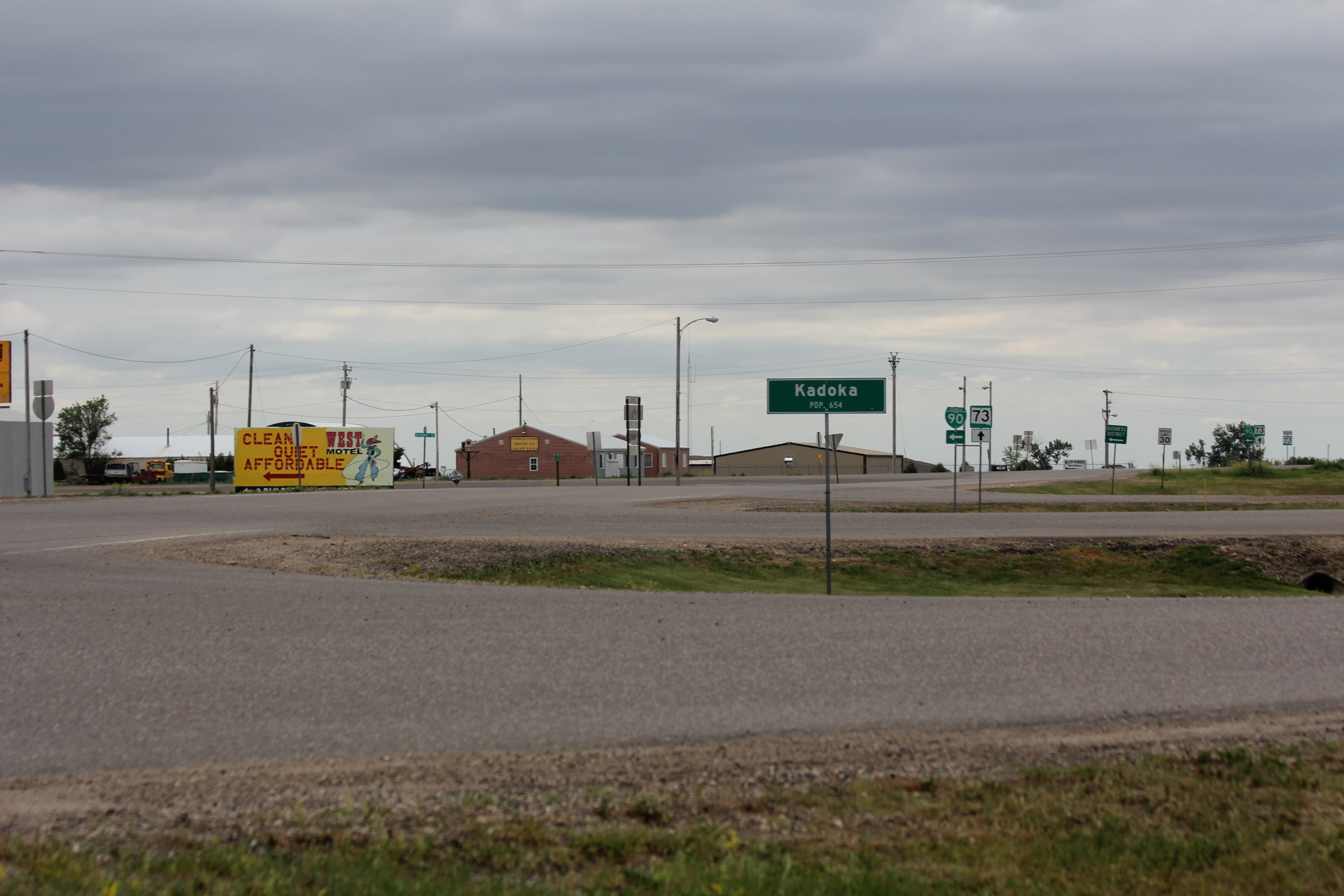
- Sign on South Dakota Highway 73
- Motto: "Gateway To The Badlands"
- Location in Jackson County and the state of South Dakota
- Coordinates: 43°49′57″N 101°30′29″W
- Country: United States
- State: South Dakota
- County: Jackson
- Founded: 1906

Area
  - Total: 2.31 sq mi (5.99 km^{2})
  - Land: 2.29 sq mi (5.92 km^{2})
  - Water: 0.027 sq mi (0.07 km^{2})
- Elevation: 2,461 ft (750 m)

Population (2020)
  - Total: 543
  - Density: 237.6/sq mi (91.74/km^{2})
- Time zone: UTC-7 (Mountain (MST))
  - Summer (DST): UTC-6 (MDT)
- ZIP code: 57543
- Area code: 605
- FIPS code: 46-33180
- GNIS feature ID: 1267442
- Website: www.kadokasd.com

A postcard showing gold miners near Kadoka, taken circa 1910.

Kadoka is a city in and the county seat of Jackson County, South Dakota, United States. The population was 543 at the 2020 census. The town occupies about 2.3 square miles.

== History ==
Kadoka got its start in 1906 when the Chicago, Milwaukee, St. Paul and Pacific Railroad was extended to that point. The name "Kadoka" was chosen via a corruption of the Lakota language word "Oȟlóka," transl. opening or hole, due to its proximity to the Badlands National Park's wall. The town was designated county seat of the newly formed Jackson County in 1915.

== Geography and climate ==
According to the United States Census Bureau, the city has a total area of 2.32 square miles (6.01 km^{2}), of which 2.29 square miles (5.93 km^{2}) is land and 0.03 square miles (0.08 km^{2}) is water.

== Demographics ==
Historical population
Census	Pop.	Note	%±
1910	222		—
1920	341		53.6%
1930	385		12.9%
1940	464		20.5%
1950	584		25.9%
1960	840		43.8%
1970	815		−3.0%
1980	832		2.1%
1990	736		−11.5%
2000	706		−4.1%
2010	654		−7.4%
2020	543		−17.0%
U.S. Decennial Census

=== 2020 census ===
As of the 2020 census, Kadoka had a population of 543. The median age was 40.5 years. 25.0% of residents were under the age of 18 and 23.4% of residents were 65 years of age or older. For every 100 females there were 91.9 males, and for every 100 females age 18 and over there were 85.0 males age 18 and over.

0.0% of residents lived in urban areas, while 100.0% lived in rural areas.

There were 226 households in Kadoka, of which 25.7% had children under the age of 18 living in them. Of all households, 41.6% were married-couple households, 20.8% were households with a male householder and no spouse or partner present, and 30.1% were households with a female householder and no spouse or partner present. About 36.7% of all households were made up of individuals and 15.9% had someone living alone who was 65 years of age or older.

There were 278 housing units, of which 18.7% were vacant. The homeowner vacancy rate was 0.6% and the rental vacancy rate was 15.2%.

Racial composition as of the 2020 census
Race	Number	Percent
White	398	73.3%
Black or African American	2	0.4%
American Indian and Alaska Native	85	15.7%
Asian	1	0.2%
Native Hawaiian and Other Pacific Islander	2	0.4%
Some other race	6	1.1%
Two or more races	49	9.0%
Hispanic or Latino (of any race)	8	1.5%

=== 2010 census ===
As of the census of 2010, there were 654 people, 291 households, and 160 families residing in the city. The population density was 285.6 inhabitants per square mile (110.3/km^{2}). There were 350 housing units at an average density of 152.8 per square mile (59.0/km^{2}). The racial makeup of the city was 81.2% White, 0.5% African American, 13.3% Native American, and 5.0% from two or more races. Hispanic or Latino of any race were 0.2% of the population.

There were 291 households, of which 27.8% had children under the age of 18 living with them, 39.9% were married couples living together, 10.0% had a female householder with no husband present, 5.2% had a male householder with no wife present, and 45.0% were non-families. 40.5% of all households were made up of individuals, and 19.6% had someone living alone who was 65 years of age or older. The average household size was 2.17 and the average family size was 2.94.

The median age in the city was 44.5 years. 24.9% of residents were under the age of 18; 6.1% were between the ages of 18 and 24; 19.4% were from 25 to 44; 25.1% were from 45 to 64; and 24.5% were 65 years of age or older. The gender makeup of the city was 46.9% male and 53.1% female.

=== 2000 census ===
As of the census of 2000, there were 706 people, 293 households, and 172 families residing in the city. The population density was 305.0 inhabitants per square mile (117.8/km^{2}). There were 356 housing units at an average density of 153.8 per square mile (59.4/km^{2}). The racial makeup of the city was 83.99% White, 0.14% African American, 13.03% Native American, 0.14% Asian, 0.14% from other races, and 2.55% from two or more races. Hispanic or Latino of any race were 0.28% of the population.

There were 293 households, out of which 29.4% had children under the age of 18 living with them, 48.8% were married couples living together, 9.6% had a female householder with no husband present, and 41.0% were non-families. 35.5% of all households were made up of individuals, and 20.1% had someone living alone who was 65 years of age or older. The average household size was 2.33 and the average family size was 3.11.

In the city, the population was spread out, with 27.6% under the age of 18, 5.8% from 18 to 24, 21.4% from 25 to 44, 22.4% from 45 to 64, and 22.8% who were 65 years of age or older. The median age was 42 years. For every 100 females, there were 86.3 males. For every 100 females age 18 and over, there were 80.6 males.

The median income for a household in the city was $26,875, and the median income for a family was $31,167. Males had a median income of $26,818 versus $18,750 for females. The per capita income for the city was $13,758. About 10.5% of families and 13.8% of the population were below the poverty line, including 22.0% of those under age 18 and 13.4% of those age 65 or over.

== Transportation ==
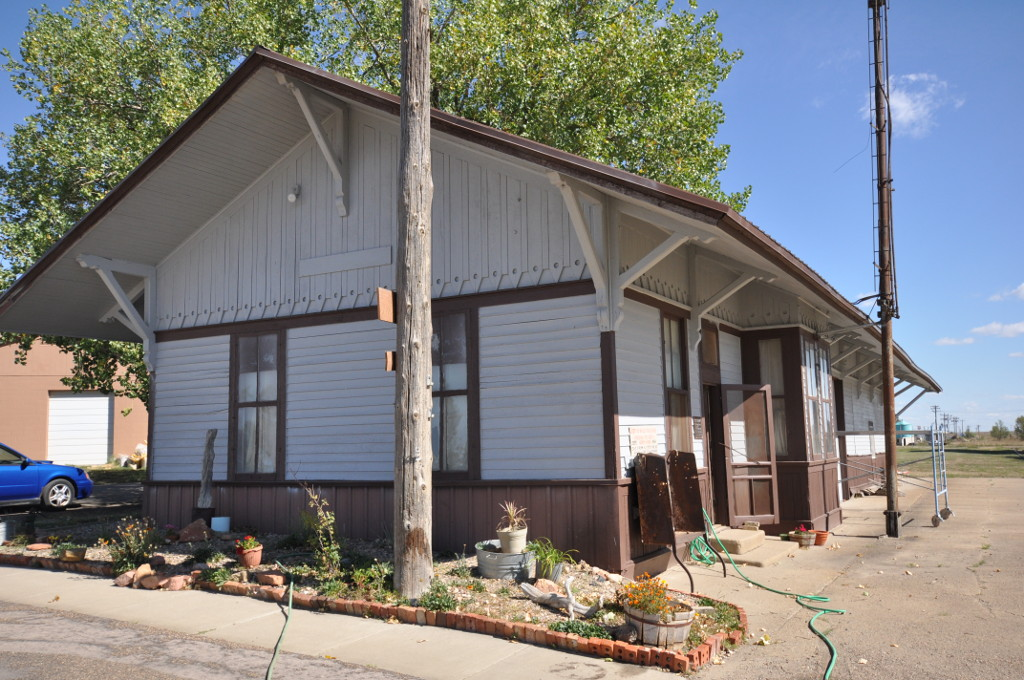
Chicago, Milwaukee, and St. Paul Railroad Depot

The Ringneck and Western Railroad operates freight service on the former Milwaukee Road / former Dakota Southern Railway line to Mitchell, South Dakota which terminates in Kadoka, but the railroad is out of service west of Presho, South Dakota and rail banked beyond Kadoka to Rapid City, South Dakota.

=== Kadoka airport ===
The City of Kadoka owns and operates the Kadoka airport. The airport has two turf runways. It is not entirely fenced so pedestrian traffic may approach the taxiways. The airport is located in the eastern part of the town near the Kadoka school athletic facilities.

== Depot Museum ==
The town has a museum that occupies the building that used to be the train station. It is only open from 6 p.m. to 8 p.m. on certain days of the week.

== Climate ==
Climate data for Kadoka, South Dakota
Month	Jan	Feb	Mar	Apr	May	Jun	Jul	Aug	Sep	Oct	Nov	Dec	Year
Record high °F (°C)	75 (24)	75 (24)	87 (31)	96 (36)	105 (41)	111 (44)	117 (47)	113 (45)	108 (42)	97 (36)	84 (29)	72 (22)	117 (47)
Mean daily maximum °F (°C)	37.5 (3.1)	39.4 (4.1)	49.2 (9.6)	61.1 (16.2)	71.0 (21.7)	81.5 (27.5)	90.7 (32.6)	88.8 (31.6)	77.3 (25.2)	62.3 (16.8)	47.3 (8.5)	38.9 (3.8)	62.1 (16.7)
Mean daily minimum °F (°C)	15.9 (−8.9)	17.2 (−8.2)	25.8 (−3.4)	35.6 (2.0)	45.1 (7.3)	55.5 (13.1)	62.7 (17.1)	59.5 (15.3)	49.4 (9.7)	36.8 (2.7)	24.8 (−4.0)	17.5 (−8.1)	37.2 (2.9)
Record low °F (°C)	−35 (−37)	−42 (−41)	−29 (−34)	1 (−17)	15 (−9)	32 (0)	37 (3)	32 (0)	20 (−7)	−8 (−22)	−25 (−32)	−32 (−36)	−42 (−41)
Average precipitation inches (mm)	0.50 (13)	0.77 (20)	1.58 (40)	2.44 (62)	2.58 (66)	2.33 (59)	2.06 (52)	1.52 (39)	1.67 (42)	0.98 (25)	0.73 (19)	0.36 (9.1)	17.52 (445)
Average snowfall inches (cm)	5.5 (14)	5.2 (13)	10.3 (26)	3.6 (9.1)	0 (0)	0 (0)	0 (0)	0 (0)	0 (0)	1.7 (4.3)	4.9 (12)	3.1 (7.9)	34.3 (87)

== Notable people ==
- Philip Hogen, U.S. Attorney for the District of South Dakota and chairman of the National Indian Gaming Commission

== See also ==
- List of cities in South Dakota
