= Redfern, South Dakota =

Coordinates: 44°00′09″N 103°38′42″W

Redfern is the site of an old Black Hills Gold Rush community. The area is located at the eastern base of Redfern Mountain, 6,076 feet in elevation, in Pennington County, South Dakota. The mountain and the Redfern townsite is located on the gravel road to Mystic, South Dakota, and is about a mile from the old town site of Tigerville. The Mystic Road is approximately miles from Hill City on the Deerfield Road.

Redfern was first established as a Black Hills Gold Rush community in 1876. It was initially named Happy Camp by a group of California miners who came from the area of Happy Camp in northern California. California Gulch is located about one mile east of Redfern in rugged hills and gullies. Happy Camp (Redfern) was thus located because of the easily accessible terrain and because it was on the stage coach route to Deadwood.

After the California gold miners got their gold and left, the Happy Camp area became known as 'Windy Flats'. In 1890, the railroad came through the area, building toward Deadwood and the location was then known as Redfern. George Redfern was the railroad construction boss and he built a siding with water towers at the location and it was named after him.

The Redfern area is the center of many gold mines, old habitation locations, and timber camps.
