= Sheridan Lake =

Sheridan Lake may refer to:

- Sheridan Lake (South Dakota), reservoir in Pennington County, South Dakota
- Sheridan Lake (Hubbard County, Minnesota), lake in Hubbard County, Minnesota
- Sheridan Lake, Colorado, Statutory Town in Kiowa County, Colorado
