= Rochford, South Dakota =

- unincorporated town
- Location of Rochford in South Dakota.
- Coordinates: 44.1244280°N 103.7196408°W
- Country: United States
- State: South Dakota
- County: Pennington
- Township: Rochford
- Founded: May 1878
- Founder: R.B. Hughes and M. D. Rochford
- Elevation: 5,302 ft (1,616 m)

Population (2010)
  - Total: 8
- Time zone: UTC-7 (Mountain Time Zone (MST))
  - Summer (DST): UTC-6 (MDT)

Rochford (founded May 1878) is an unincorporated community in Pennington County, South Dakota, United States. It is not tracked by the U.S. Census Bureau.

== Naming ==
Rochford was named in honor of one of its founders, M. D. Rochford, in May 1878.

== History ==
=== Founding and local mining operations ===
In August 1876, three hunters accidentally discovered what became the Montezuma Gold Mine. Hopeful placer miners from Lead and Central City flocked to the area, staking claims along Little Rapid Creek. The first cabin that established the future site of Rochford was started in February 1877 when M. D. Rochford built a cabin there. In March 1877, an official mining district was set up in the area. In May 1878, Rochford, who was the county commissioner, and R. B. Hughes laid out the town in a gulch. Mining operations in the area included the Silver Reef, Resumption, Pride of the West, Oro Cache, Rattler, Mountain Treasure, Justin, Glenwood, Little Woodchuck, Ethan Allen, Wide West, and Surprise Fraction, as well as branches of the Homestake Mining Company. The town made its profit from the local Evangeline and Minnesota gold mines, which each had a 20-stamp mill; and the Stand-By mine. The Stand-By 40-stamp mill planned in 1879 used a flume to haul water and create power. There was a large office at this mill that the locals nicknamed "The Mansion," though it was torn down some time before 1950. This mine and mill contributed to much of Rochford's growth. A sawmill produced 900,000 feet (270,000 m) of lumber for the operations. The mill's building was delayed in March 1880 due to the freight train's inability to make it to the mill, due to a snowfall of 4 feet (1.2 m). Though the mill was running 60-stamps by May 1880, it closed in 1881, and from there began running intermittently until 1936.

=== Growth ===
By December 1878, the town had a population of 500, including a few doctors, a Methodist Episcopal Church, three saloons, six stores, and 100 homes. Property was sold for anywhere from $10 to $60. However, there were not yet any dance halls, casinos, or hotels. Several Deadwood businessmen showed interest in extending their companies to Rochford, but they were put off by the lack of a daily postal service and mills. Other local camps included Montezuma, Golden Centre, Tigerville, Montana City, Ochre City, Sitting Bull, Florence, Castleton, and Elkorn.

By January 1879, two hotels, a theater, a butcher shop, two restaurants, two blacksmith shops, and a drugstore had been added. The Reder Brothers Sawmill was moved from Rockerville to provide lumber for the town's buildings; by January 1879, it had produced 100,000 feet (30,000 m) of lumber and 50,000 feet (15,000 m) of roof shingles. Lawrence County funded the building of a highway to connect the town to Deadwood for $300. This was a strategic move for Deadwood businessmen, who wanted to divert trade from Rapid City. For a time, it was rumored that the western part of Pennington County would split and become Martin County, and would make Rochford the county seat, but no such action was ever taken. That year, Rochford worried that the nearby camp of Golden Centre would take over as the central point of trade. In 1880, the U.S. Census Bureau recorded 315 residents. Rochford added a pool parlor and a newspaper, "The Central." The Langrishe Theatre Company once performed at the Rochford theatre. The Rochford School District was organized in April 1880. Another newspaper, "The Rochford Miner", surfaced, but it was discontinued in 1881. At its peak, there were 200 homes, a school, and a street lined with stores and covered sidewalks. Rochford was the home of pioneer Annie D. Tallent in the 1880s. Between 1880 and 1882, the town started to decline, but in September 1882, the Black Hills Times in Deadwood reported that Rochford had picked up in activity.

=== Later history and today ===
The town was down to 48 residents and a post office by 1900. No one in the town died until January 1904, when a man called Alex McCall was accidentally shot; therefore, there was no cemetery for a long time. A few mines in the area are still running. The town relies on these mines and tourism. Several historic buildings are still standing, but others have fallen into disrepair. Today, there is a population of 25. In the 1950s, only the Moonshine Gulch Saloon, Irish Gulch Dance Hall, and one store were open. The Moonshine Gulch Saloon is still in operation. Today, the town survives solely on tourism.

== Geography ==
Rochford is in the Black Hills just south of the border between Lawrence and Pennington counties; it is located in the latter. Its coordinates are 44.1244280°N 103.7196408°W. Rochford is approximately 16 miles northwest of Hill City, 1.5 miles north of Florence, and about 2.5 miles northeast of Myers City. It is on a gravel road that connects it to Mystic, Lead, South Dakota, and Deadwood. Rochford was built in a gulch near Rapid Creek.

=== Climate ===
Rochford has a humid continental climate (Koppen: Dwb) with four distinct seasons. Summers are warm, sometimes hot, and winters are cold with very chilly nights. A freeze has been recorded for every month of the year. Precipitation peaks during late spring and slowly decreases with each passing month until it reached .28 inches of precipitation (7.1 mm) in the month of January before it rises again.

Climate data for Rochford 2 WNW, South Dakota, 1991–2020 normals, 1897-2020 extremes: 5450ft (1661m)
Month	Jan	Feb	Mar	Apr	May	Jun	Jul	Aug	Sep	Oct	Nov	Dec	Year
Record high °F (°C)	62 (17)	63 (17)	73 (23)	83 (28)	86 (30)	97 (36)	100 (38)	104 (40)	94 (34)	87 (31)	74 (23)	67 (19)	104 (40)
Mean maximum °F (°C)	55.8 (13.2)	56.4 (13.6)	63.9 (17.7)	71.3 (21.8)	79.8 (26.6)	86.7 (30.4)	91.6 (33.1)	89.2 (31.8)	84.8 (29.3)	77.6 (25.3)	62.4 (16.9)	55.7 (13.2)	92.8 (33.8)
Mean daily maximum °F (°C)	36.8 (2.7)	37.2 (2.9)	45.1 (7.3)	50.9 (10.5)	59.7 (15.4)	71.4 (21.9)	79.8 (26.6)	78.8 (26.0)	71.2 (21.8)	56.3 (13.5)	44.4 (6.9)	36.5 (2.5)	55.7 (13.2)
Daily mean °F (°C)	19.7 (−6.8)	20.7 (−6.3)	28.3 (−2.1)	36.1 (2.3)	45.1 (7.3)	55.1 (12.8)	61.7 (16.5)	59.5 (15.3)	51.3 (10.7)	38.8 (3.8)	28.2 (−2.1)	21.3 (−5.9)	38.8 (3.8)
Mean daily minimum °F (°C)	2.6 (−16.3)	4.2 (−15.4)	11.6 (−11.3)	21.3 (−5.9)	30.6 (−0.8)	38.7 (3.7)	43.7 (6.5)	40.3 (4.6)	31.5 (−0.3)	21.4 (−5.9)	12.0 (−11.1)	6.1 (−14.4)	22.0 (−5.5)
Mean minimum °F (°C)	−20.9 (−29.4)	−21.1 (−29.5)	−12.9 (−24.9)	2.1 (−16.6)	16.3 (−8.7)	27.2 (−2.7)	32.4 (0.2)	29.9 (−1.2)	19.9 (−6.7)	2.8 (−16.2)	−9.1 (−22.8)	−18.7 (−28.2)	−32.0 (−35.6)
Record low °F (°C)	−36 (−38)	−46 (−43)	−38 (−39)	−15 (−26)	3 (−16)	23 (−5)	25 (−4)	22 (−6)	11 (−12)	−18 (−28)	−22 (−30)	−60 (−51)	−60 (−51)
Average precipitation inches (mm)	0.59 (15)	0.66 (17)	1.05 (27)	2.08 (53)	3.43 (87)	3.25 (83)	3.28 (83)	1.96 (50)	1.41 (36)	1.76 (45)	0.92 (23)	0.65 (17)	21.04 (536)
Average snowfall inches (cm)	12.0 (30)	12.6 (32)	12.7 (32)	15.0 (38)	3.7 (9.4)	0.7 (1.8)	0.0 (0.0)	0.0 (0.0)	1.4 (3.6)	8.2 (21)	10.8 (27)	11.5 (29)	88.6 (223.8)
Source 1: NOAA
Source 2: XMACIS (1991-2006 precip/snowfall, records & monthly max/mins)

Climate data for Rochford, South Dakota
Month	Jan	Feb	Mar	Apr	May	Jun	Jul	Aug	Sep	Oct	Nov	Dec	Year
Record high °F (°C)	68 (20)	68 (20)	78 (26)	85 (29)	93 (34)	99 (37)	101 (38)	98 (37)	98 (37)	86 (30)	75 (24)	65 (18)	101 (38)
Mean daily maximum °F (°C)	37 (3)	38 (3)	44 (7)	51 (11)	61 (16)	71 (22)	79 (26)	78 (26)	69 (21)	56 (13)	44 (7)	36 (2)	55 (13)
Mean daily minimum °F (°C)	11 (−12)	11 (−12)	17 (−8)	25 (−4)	35 (2)	44 (7)	50 (10)	48 (9)	38 (3)	28 (−2)	19 (−7)	11 (−12)	28 (−2)
Record low °F (°C)	−34 (−37)	−34 (−37)	−24 (−31)	−8 (−22)	13 (−11)	24 (−4)	29 (−2)	27 (−3)	15 (−9)	−8 (−22)	−21 (−29)	−35 (−37)	−35 (−37)
Average precipitation inches (mm)	0.28 (7.1)	0.51 (13)	1.13 (29)	2.15 (55)	3.97 (101)	3.20 (81)	2.72 (69)	2.26 (57)	1.67 (42)	1.50 (38)	0.61 (15)	0.34 (8.6)	20.34 (517)
Source: The Weather Channel (Historical Monthly Averages)

== Demographics ==
In 1880, there were 315 people living in Rochford, and by 1900, there were 48 residents. In 2010, there were only 25 residents.

== Notable people ==
- Elmer Ballard, actor, best known for his supporting role in Alibi
