= Stratobowl =

Compact natural depression

Coordinates: 43.97668°N 103.3452°W

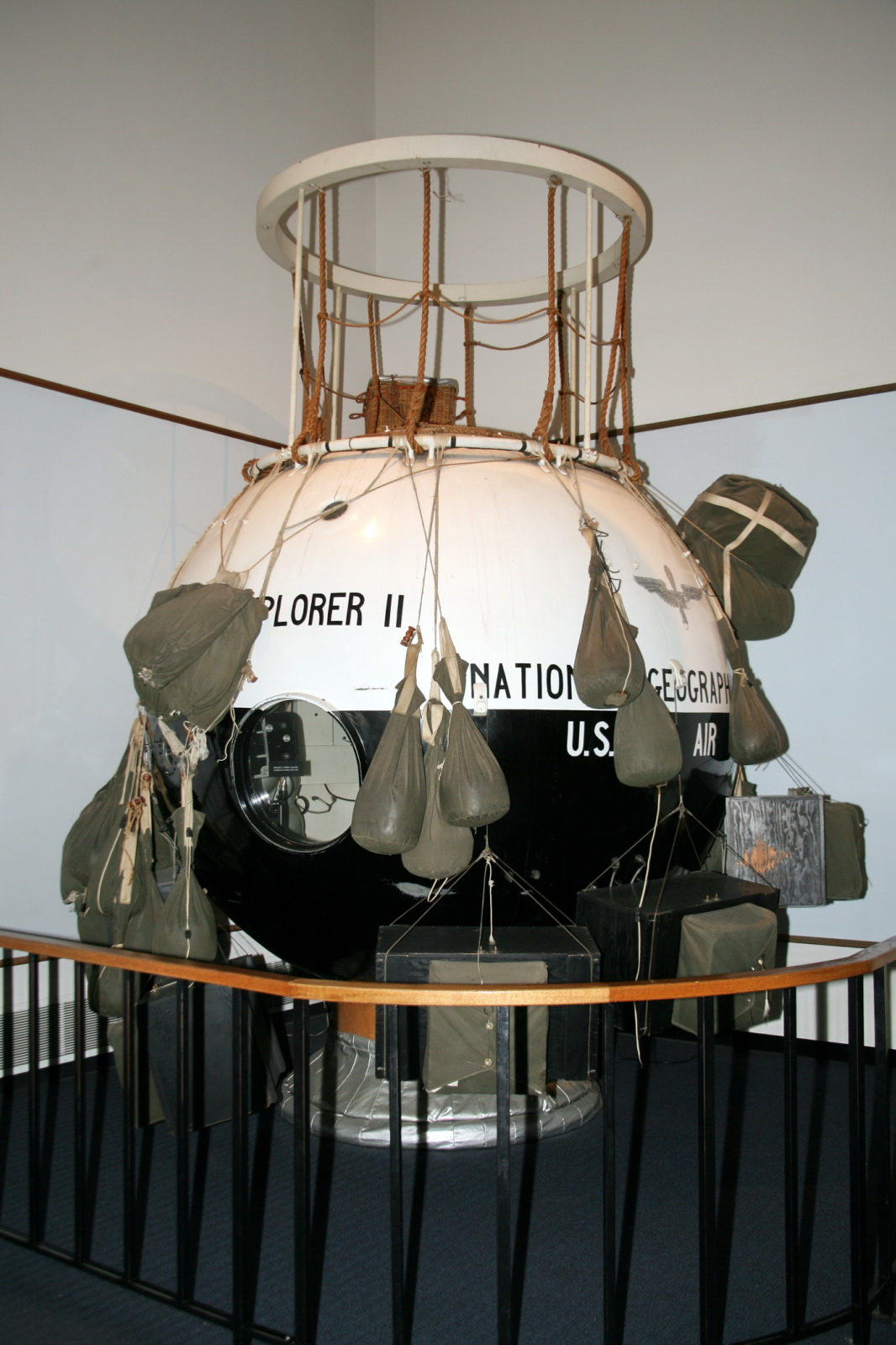
Explorer II gondola in the National Air and Space Museum

The Stratobowl is a compact natural depression within the limits of Black Hills National Forest in South Dakota, south-west of Rapid City. In 1934–1935 it housed a stratospheric balloon launch site, initially known as Stratocamp, sponsored by the National Geographic Society and the United States Army Air Corps. In 1956–1959 the site was reused by the U.S. Navy Project Strato-Lab.

== Explorer balloons ==
In 1934 the NGS and Air Corps co-sponsored the Explorer, a manned high-altitude balloon capable of stratospheric flight. After the crash of the Soviet Osoaviakhim-1 that nevertheless set an altitude record of 72,178 feet (22,000 m), the sponsors redefined their primary objectives from record-setting to scientific research and tests of new navigation instruments. Air Corps Capt. Albert William Stevens, Capt. Orvil Arson Anderson and Maj. William E. Kepner were selected to fly the Explorer. Kepner and Anderson, experienced balloonists, were in charge of locating a suitable launch site. According to Kepner, an ideal site would be a crater or canyon, a clear grassy valley encircled with rocky ridges high enough to shield the tall balloon from any wind. Ideally, the launch site it would have a high-voltage electric line, road and rail access, "and a trout stream". Kepner and Anderson eventually located their dream canyon near Rapid City, South Dakota. City officials, fascinated by the expected publicity campaign, agreed to build a road and electric line.

Anderson directed construction of a temporary village, housing over 100 people, with the help of the South Dakota National Guard and the army's 4th Cavalry Regiment. The central pad, 200 feet (61 m) in diameter, was cushioned with sawdust to protect the fabric of the balloon as it was spread on the ground prior to inflation. Preparation for flight was regularly reported by the national press. Explorer lifted off at 6:45, July 28, 1934, an event broadcast live over the radio and watched by 30,000 spectators on site. After seven hours in flight the pilots noticed holes torn in the bottom of the gas bag; quickly losing gas, the balloon plunged into an uncontrolled dive, its gas bag disintegrating as the balloon picked up vertical speed. At 5,000 feet (1,500 m) the remaining hydrogen exploded, sending the gondola in a free fall. According to Ryan, the pilots managed to bail out after the explosion, Kepner at an altitude of barely 500 feet (150 m); according to Shayler, they bailed out before the explosion; all three survived uninjured. Later it turned out that the Explorer missed a world record by 624 feet (190 m). The accident was linked to folds in the balloon's fabric that put it under extreme stress as the balloon expanded in stratosphere.

The NGS and Air Corps vowed to launch a new balloon in June 1935, but the new helium-filled Explorer II was not ready until November. Watched by 20,000 spectators, Explorer II lifted off at 8:00 November 11 and reached a new record height of 72,395 feet (22,066 m). Anderson, Kepner, and Stevens became the first men to view the Earth's curvature.

== Strato-Lab balloons ==
In the 1950s, Project Manhigh and Project Strato-Lab launches were made from the man-made crater of an iron mining pit near Crosby, Minnesota, and, if weather allowed, from Fleming Field in South St. Paul, Minnesota. The Stratobowl was a backup location. There was one Stratobowl launch in 1956, three in 1958, and seven in 1959. On November 8, 1956, the Strato-Lab I gondola lifted Malcolm Ross and M. L. Lewis from the Stratobowl to a world altitude record for manned balloon flight of 76,000 feet (23,000 m). The purpose of the flight was to gather meteorological, cosmic ray, and other scientific data necessary to improve safety at high altitudes. The most publicized flight, Strato-Lab IV piloted by Malcolm Ross and Charles B. Moore, lifted off from Stratobowl on November 28, 1959, reached an altitude of 81,000 feet (25,000 m), and landed safely in Kansas after 20 hours in the air. The purpose of the flight was to perform spectrographic analysis of the planet Venus with minimal interference from the Earth's atmosphere.

== Sources ==
- Ryan, Craig (2003). The Pre-Astronauts. Naval Institute Press. ISBN 978-1-59114-748-0.
- Lee Wells, Jr. (1935). "First High-Altitude Photo". National Geographic. Archived from the original on 2010-01-18.
- Ross, Malcolm D.; Lewis, M. Lee (February 1957), "To 76,000 Feet by Strato-Lab Balloon", National Geographic Magazine, 111 (2): 269–282
- Shayler, David (2000). Disasters and accidents in manned spaceflight. Springer. pp. 20–22. ISBN 978-1-85233-225-9.
