= Michael DeMersseman =

American politician

Member of the South Dakota House of Representatives from the 32nd district
- In office January 10, 1995 – December 15, 1997
- Succeeded by: Gary Brown

Personal details
- Born: September 27, 1939 (age 86) New Underwood, South Dakota
- Party: Republican

Michael DeMersseman (born September 27, 1939) is an American politician who served in the South Dakota House of Representatives from the 32nd district from 1995 to 1997.
