= Sitting Bull Crystal Cavern Dance Pavilion =

- U.S. National Register of Historic Places
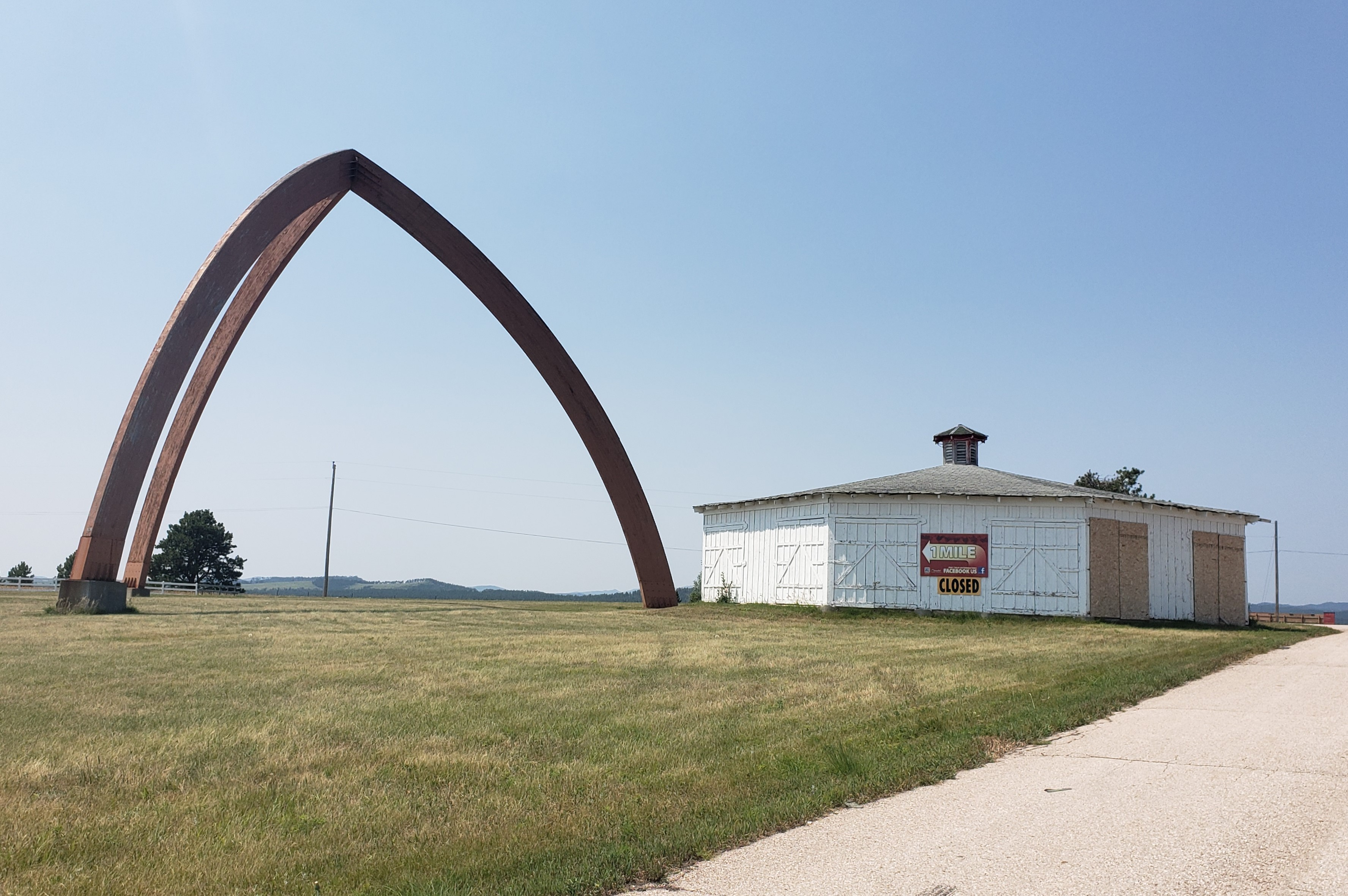
- The pavilion in 2021, with arch sculpture in foreground

- Location within South Dakota Location within the United States
- Location: U.S. Highway 16
- Nearest city: Rockerville, South Dakota
- Coordinates: 43°58′21.5″N 103°18′47.6″W
- Area: less than one acre
- Built: 1934
- Built by: Duhamel, Alex, Bud and Peter
- Architectural style: Polygonal
- NRHP reference No.: 95001475
- Added to NRHP: December 14, 1995

The Sitting Bull Crystal Cavern Dance Pavilion is a historic event venue on the south side of U.S. Highway 16 northeast of Rockerville, South Dakota, near the Sitting Bull Crystal Caverns. Built in 1934, it hosted the Duhamel Sioux Indian Pageant, a Lakota tourist performance created by Black Elk in 1927. The pageant ran every summer until its discontinuation in 1957. A major attraction in the 1930s, its purpose was to not only profit off of tourism to the nearby Black Hills and Mount Rushmore but also—according to Black Elk—to represent Lakota traditions in a respectful, authentic way. It was added to the National Register of Historic Places in 1995 as a venue of enduring cultural and religious significance, and for its association with Black Elk.

== History ==
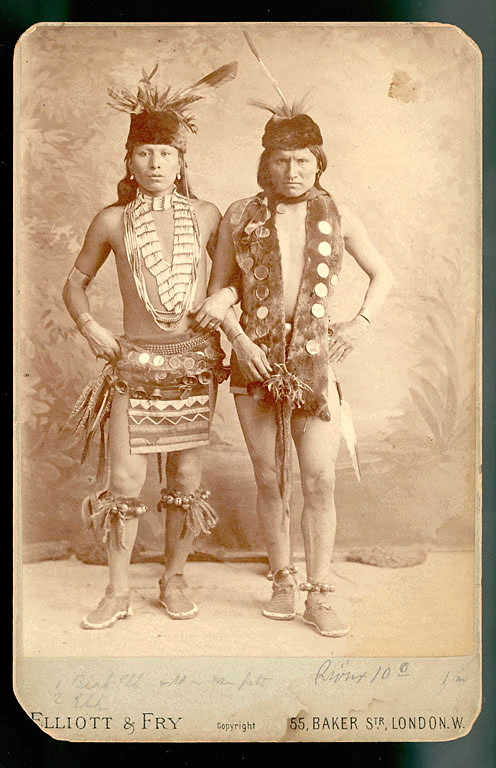
Black Elk (left), while touring with Buffalo Bill's troupe in 1887

Black Elk, a local Lakota medicine man and community leader, established the Duhamel Sioux Indian Pageant around 1927; this was the first public Native American-created dance pageant in the United States, as those preceding it had been established by non-Native-owned Wild West shows. Black Elk himself had toured internationally with Buffalo Bill in the late 19th century. Black Elk aimed to preserve Lakota culture "and, at the same time, to teach non-Indian tourists that the Lakota were not savages and that their culture was a thing of beauty which deserved respect". Black Elk had a close friendship with the Duhamel family from nearby Rapid City, and in its early years, the pageant was held at the Duhamels' general store. Alex Duhamel, the patriarch of the family, had moved to Rapid City in 1879 and traded with the local Lakota, with whom he had formed a good relationship. In 1929, the Duhamels purchased the land on which the Sitting Bull Crystal Caverns are located, just off South Dakota Highway 16; tourists traveling from Rapid City to Mount Rushmore had to drive past it, and the caverns themselves thus became a popular tourist stop. For the same reason, Black Elk deemed the entry road to the caverns as a good location for the pageant's theater. Additionally, the caverns themselves and the greater Rockerville Gulch area are sacred and culturally significant to the Lakota.

Alex Duhamel and his sons Pete and Bud helped build the pavilion, which was completed in 1934. A tipi-shaped building was constructed outside the hall to be used for ticket sales. A model of a traditional Lakota village, called the Sioux Indian Village, was also set up at this time next to the pavilion. Guests could walk through this village and interact with performers from the show; tribe members also sold their own wares here, which were available for purchase. Sitting Bull's name was appended to the attraction in honor of the late chief; one of the pageant performers was his nephew, John Sitting Bull.

Public performances were held twice daily—once in the morning and again in the evening—during the summer months from 1934 to 1957. Performers stayed at a private campsite on the grounds behind the village and proceeded from there to the pavilion, led by Alex and Peter Duhamel. Peter was also the original translator and emcee for the event. The pageant consisted of traditional Lakota ceremonies, led by Black Elk himself, which included healing, holy pipe, burial, and mourning rituals. Dances included the Ghost Dance, Sun Dance, and a Rabbit Dance, the latter of which the public was invited to participate in. New ceremonies were introduced for special occasions or to attract fresh publicity; an advertisement from 1940 promoted a "dog feed", in which the Lakota would roast and prepare a dog for a feast; and a "horse dance", which used horses to represent the four directions of the Earth. At the end of each performance, a hat was passed around for donations, and those proceeds went directly to the performers.

The 1883 Code of Indian Offenses had prohibited Native Americans—particularly the Lakota—from performing most of these rituals and dances, including the Ghost and Sun Dances, and was especially enforced after the Ghost Dance War and subsequent Wounded Knee Massacre in 1890. Thus, when the Sioux Falls Dance Pageant began performing in 1927, its ceremonies were technically illegal under United States law, until the repeal of this ban later in 1934. A 1940s advertisement claimed that the pageant had received "special permission" from the federal government to continue.

Traveling shows were also performed in Rapid City and across the Midwest. Once a day during the summer months, a group of dancers would perform outside the Duhamels' downtown mercantile store or at Baken Park in Rapid City; the downtown performances were later canceled due to traffic concerns. Other cities where shows were performed included Omaha, Nebraska; and Cedar Falls, Iowa in 1938. Chief Red Bear joined the group at their Cedar Falls shows; he and Black Elk also spoke about their experience at the Wounded Knee Massacre there.

After the outbreak of World War II, the deaths of both Alex and Peter Duhamel in 1941, and Black Elk's death in 1950, interest in the pageant waned. Bud Duhamel had taken over operations after the deaths of his father and brother. Black Elk had retired some years prior to his death, and it became difficult for the Duhamels to find Lakota who were willing to perform after his departure from the show. The Duhamel Sioux Indian Pageant eventually closed in 1957. Bud Duhamel continued to operate the Sitting Bull Crystal Caverns until 1998; the caverns themselves were open to public tours until 2015. Today, the dance pavilion is used as storage space. On December 14, 1995, the pavilion was added to the National Register of Historic Places for its cultural and religious significance, contribution to Lakota history, and its association with Black Elk.

=== Reception and impact ===
The Duhamel Sioux Indian Pageant was well-received by tourists, who often sold out the venue. The opportunity to meet Native Americans enticed white tourists from across the country. The Duhamels' personal business in Rapid City also saw an increase in sales due to the name association. The pageant was so successful and the economic opportunities so promising that many Lakota began performing in new cultural events in communities across the Black Hills—such as Deadwood, Hot Springs, Wind Cave National Park, and Custer State Park―and even began selling entry to their campsites.

The pageant and associated tourism provided a good source of income for the dancers during the Great Depression, which had heavily damaged the Black Hills' economy and left local families struggling, including many Lakota. Employment opportunities were already limited for Native Americans, who had not been allowed to leave their reservations without special permission until the 1920s. Most buildings there lacked water and electricity, and food was scarce. Land on the reservations was usually of poor quality for farming. The pageants, parades, and other tourist attractions in the Black Hills created a respite from poverty.

Anywhere from 25 to 50 Lakota participated in each performance and the greater Sitting Bull Crystal Caverns property; bands with a confirmed presence included the Sicangu, Oglala, and Hunkpapa. Performers often brought their families to live with them at the campsite during the summer, and these family members would often work in other roles at the pavilion or the caverns. Primary accounts from employees themselves say that the Lakota performers were respected and never mistreated. Additionally, the sale of their own homemade goods and crafts in the mock village area generated additional income for the performers and their families. The pageant provided an outlet for the Lakota to perform the ceremonies that had been suppressed for decades by the United States government. Lakota could also now afford to visit, and live at, sites that were culturally and spiritually important, such as the Sitting Bull Crystal Caverns, the nearby Wind Caves, and the Black Hills themselves.

However, offensive language and stereotypes were often used to promote the show as an exotic spectacle. Although Black Elk had authored the show, he could not control the language used for its publicity. Newspaper and radio advertisements exploited the public's perception of Native traditions as "savage" and violent, and implied that the performers were of a bygone time. One newspaper advertisement from 1940 read, "The soft beat of the tom-tom mingled with the savage war cry of the last savage will make your blood tingle."

== Architecture ==
The pavilion is an octagonal theatre in the round, constructed out of white vertical wooden boards and on a poured concrete foundation. All eight sides have large swinging double doors that provide multiple entry points. The low-grade conical roof is supported by a central hexagonal column and tie beams that run the length of the ceiling. An octagonal cupola sits atop the roof; both are topped with asphalt shingles. The inside features five large murals depicting local places of interest created by Sicangu artist Godfrey Broken Rope. The inside has remained unchanged since 1957, when the audience bleachers were removed. The tipi structure that was used for ticket sales was demolished in the early 1990s.

A 60-foot-tall (18 m) sculpture, crafted from three wooden arches, sits just south of the pavilion. The arches were originally intended to be installed in the Keystone Wye bridge in 1967 but were rejected after they fell off of a truck en route to the construction site. Although deemed structurally sound, the South Dakota Department of Transportation decided to take no chances and retired the potentially-damaged load. These arches were to be part of a proposed Rushmore Memorial Arch Park, at a different location along U.S. 16, where they would encompass and bring attention to a memorial to five key people behind the creation of Mount Rushmore. The arches were put up, and visible into the 1980s, but the memorial park itself was never completed. The structure, known as "The Arches", was moved to its present-day location during the 1990s.
