= South Dakota's 32nd legislative district =

American legislative district

South Dakota's 32nd State Senate district

South Dakota's 32nd legislative district is one of 35 districts in the South Dakota Legislature. Each district elects one senator and two representatives. The district comprises much of downtown and north Rapid City.

In the state senate, it has been represented by Republican Helene Duhamel since 2019. In the state house, it has been represented by Republican Steve Duffy since 2023 and Democrat Nicole Uhre-Balk since 2024.

== Geography ==
Located in western South Dakota, the district is located entirely within Pennington County in Rapid City.
