= Sitting Bull Crystal Caverns =

Cave in South Dakota, United States

Coordinates: 43°57′40.86″N 103°18′14.49″W

Sitting Bull Crystal Caverns was a limestone cave complex nine miles south of Rapid City, South Dakota on the way to Mount Rushmore and by the Wind Cave National Park. From 1934 to 2015, the cave was open for the public to tour daily from Memorial Day weekend to Labor Day weekend.

The cave was discovered by the Duhamel family, Alex and Mamie and their sons, Bud and Pete, in 1929, at their property in Rockerville Gulch. The gulch is a red rock canyon east of Rockerville. They organised tours and the Duhamel Sioux Indian Pageant to promote the caverns with a friend, Black Elk, who chose the name of the caverns in honor of his friend Sitting Bull. Black Elk held the show for over a decade from 1934 to educate people about Lakota culture. In 1992, Bud received the Ben Black Elk Award for "promotion of Native American culture." When he was 93 he retired and passed operations of the cave to his grandson, Peter Heffron. In 2015, remaining family members decided that they no longer wanted to operate the business, and the cave was closed to the public on September 27, 2015. At that time, the cave and about 730 acres of land were put up for sale. In early September 2020, developer Pat Hall from Rapid City, South Dakota purchased the site for an undisclosed amount.
