= Sheridan, South Dakota =

Sheridan, South Dakota Golden City
- Ghost town
- Location within the state of South Dakota
- Coordinates: 43.9769321°N 103.4704676°W
- Country: United States
- State: South Dakota
- County: Pennington
- Founded: 1875
- Named for: Philip Sheridan
- Elevation: 4,626 ft (1,410 m)
- Time zone: UTC-7 (Mountain Standard Time (MST))
  - Summer (DST): UTC-6 (MDT)
- GNIS feature ID: 1264593

Sheridan, originally called Golden City, was an early mining camp in Pennington County, South Dakota, United States. It was the first county seat of Pennington County, from 1877 to 1878. It is now submerged under Sheridan Lake.

== History ==
=== Founding and growth ===
Sheridan began as a gold mining camp in the Black Hills, was laid out in the spring of 1875, and was originally called Golden City. It is the third-oldest camp in the Black Hills. There were several mines in the area, including: the Queen Bee, J.R., Blue Lead and Calumet. One of the first rich placers was found there in 1875. That October, $3,000 worth of gold was taken out by placer miners. By February 1876, Golden City had several residents, four stores, and many houses. A stage line connecting Deadwood to Denver ran through the town, leading to more growth. In 1877, the town was renamed in honor of Philip Sheridan. It became the temporary county seat of Pennington County; the courthouse was built by the citizens in late 1877 and that October, held the first term of the U.S. Circuit Court west of the Missouri River.

=== Decline and abandonment ===
The circuit court later moved to Deadwood and the stage line changed course. In 1878, the county seat moved to Rapid City. In the mid-1880s, the town caught fire, and many buildings were destroyed. By 1920, there were only 10 residents in Sheridan, and the nearby mines were quickly failing. Eventually, Sheridan became a ghost town. In 1939, Spring Creek was dammed and Sheridan was submerged under the new Sheridan Lake.

The only thing that remains of Sheridan is a one-story house that was moved six miles (9.7 km) to the south just before the creek was dammed, on the edge of a small meadow. This house once belonged to Johnny and Kit Good and had 12 outside doors.

== Geography ==
Sheridan is located in the Black Hills of Pennington County, South Dakota. It is eight miles (13 km) north of Hill City, along U.S. Route 385. Sheridan is submerged approximately 20 feet (6.1 m) below the surface of Sheridan Lake. Spring Creek empties into the north end of Sheridan Lake. The Good house is located on the east side of U.S. 385, six miles south of the lake and 1.5 miles (2.4 km) north of Hill City.
