= Owanka, South Dakota =

- Unincorporated community
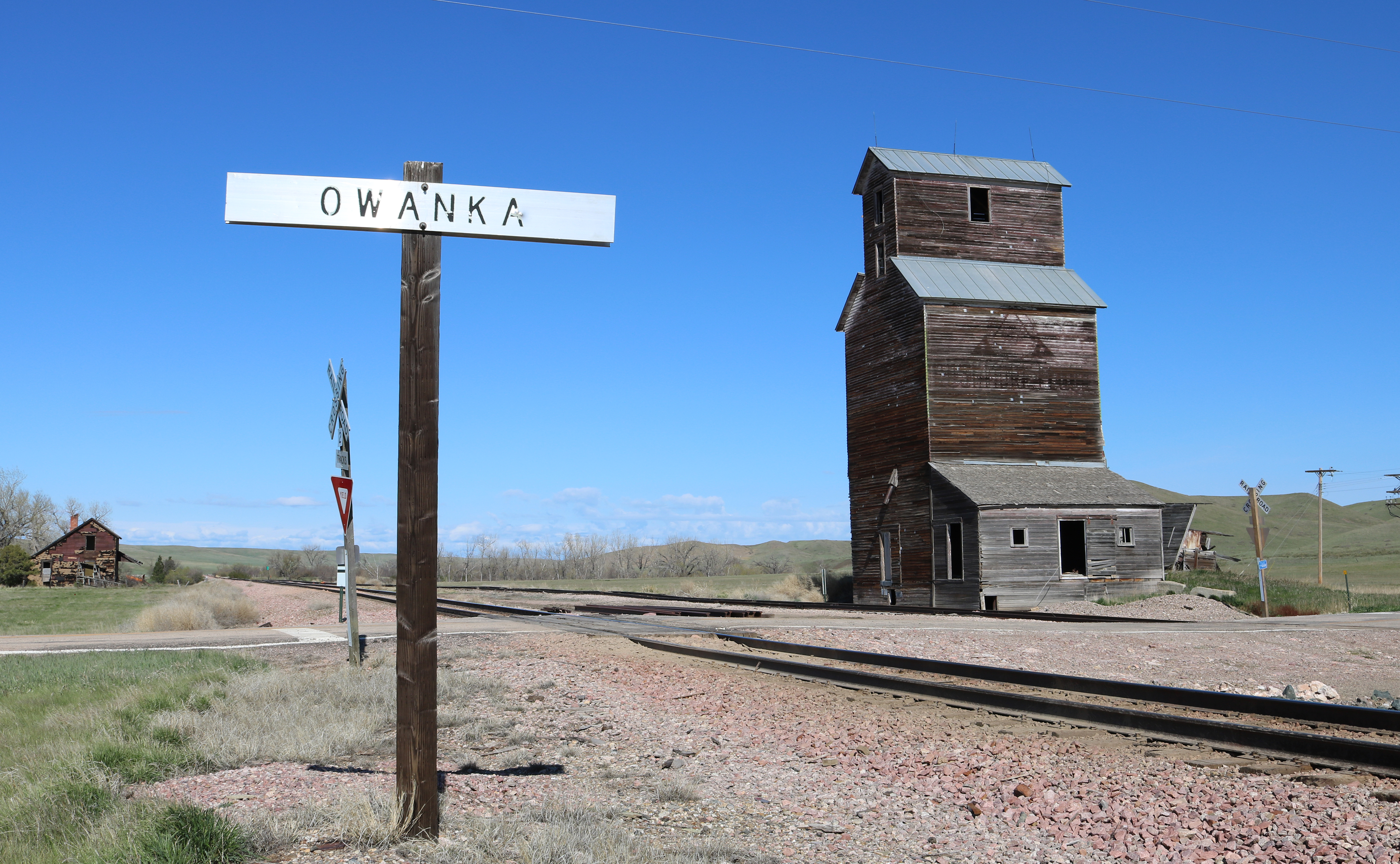
- Abandoned grain elevator in Owanka

- Location of Owanka in South Dakota.
- Coordinates: 44°01′19″N 102°35′14″W
- Country: United States
- State: South Dakota
- County: Pennington

Population estimate from Rapid City Journal newspaper article
  - Total: 2
- Time zone: UTC-7 (Mountain (MST))
  - Summer (DST): UTC-6 (MDT)
- ZIP code: 57767
- Area code: 605

Owanka is an unincorporated community in Pennington County, South Dakota, United States. Although not tracked by the United States Census Bureau, Owanka has been assigned the ZIP Code of 57767.

== History ==
The first settlement at Owanka was made in 1888. A post office called Owanka was established in 1907. Owanka is a name derived from the Sioux language, meaning "good camping ground."

Now mostly a ghost town, a single family resides in Owanka. In addition to those two people, several others reside outside the town limits.

South Dakota Magazine offers a photo gallery of old Owanka buildings in this article reference:
