= William Ellsworth Kepner =

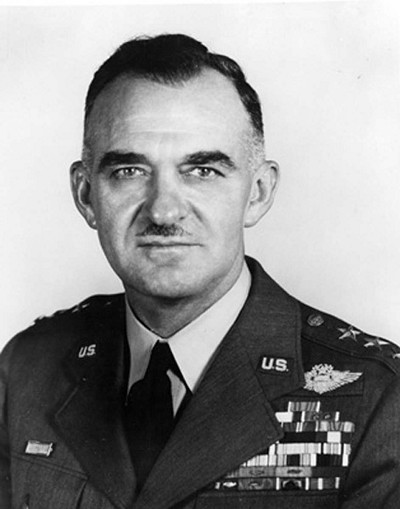
- General William Kepner
- Born: January 6, 1893; Miami, Indiana, U.S.
- Died: July 3, 1982 (aged 89) Orlando, Florida, U.S.
- Branch: United States Air Force
- Service years: 1909–1953
- Commands: VIII Fighter Command; USAF Alaska Command
- Conflicts: World War I World War II
- Awards: Distinguished Service Cross; Distinguished Flying Cross; Bronze Star

William Ellsworth Kepner (6 January 1893 – 3 July 1982) was an officer in the United States Army, United States Army Air Corps and United States Air Force, and a pioneer balloonist and airship pilot.

== Early life ==
He was born on 3 January 1893 in Miami, Indiana.

== World War I ==
From 1909 to 1913, Kepner served in the US Marine Corps. By 1916 he was a second lieutenant in the Indiana National Guard. After a short spell in the US cavalry, in 1917 he transferred to the infantry as a captain and commanded a company at the Battle of Chateau-Thierry. He subsequently lead the 3rd Battalion of the 4th US Infantry in the Meuse-Argonne offensive.

== Interwar period ==
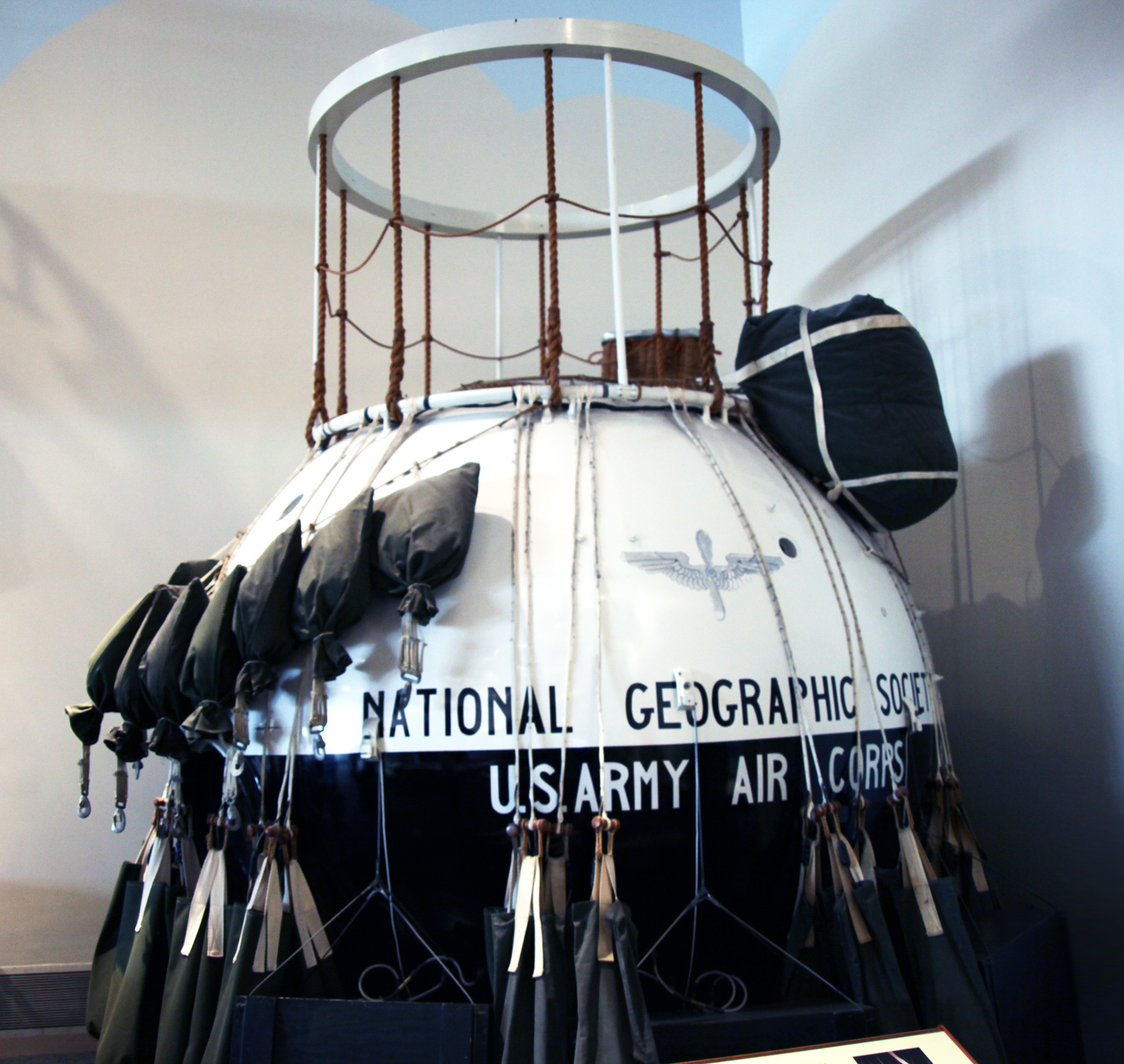
Gondola of Explorer II

In 1920, at the age of 27, he transferred to the US Army Air Corps and trained as a balloon pilot, then subsequently as an airship pilot.

From 1927 to 1929 he participated very prominently in several US national and international balloon races, most notably winning the prestigious Gordon Bennett Cup with co-pilot William Olmstead Eareckson in June 1928.

In August 1929 he was commissioned as test pilot of the radical metal-hulled airship ZMC-2, newly completed at Grosse Ile, Michigan. After a successful series of evaluation flights, he flew the airship in September of that year to what was to become its sole home base at Lakehurst, New Jersey, arriving without mishap except for a small perforation in the envelope which press reports of the time claimed to be the result of a pot-shot en route from someone on the ground.

Promoted to the rank of major in October 1930, he took command of the Materiel Division's Lighter-than-Air Branch at Wright Field, Ohio.

In the period 1930-32, he learned to fly fixed-wing aircraft.

=== Explorer ===
In the summer of 1934, Kepner took command of the joint National Geographic Society - US Army Air Corps Stratosphere Flight near Rapid City, South Dakota to make an attempt with the specially constructed balloon Explorer on the manned balloon altitude record. On 29 July, the balloon ascended with himself and two fellow US Army Air Corp officers, Capt. Albert W. Stevens and Capt. Orvil A. Anderson as crew. However, the attempt nearly ended in tragedy when the balloon envelope ruptured near maximum height, sending the spherical pressurized gondola plunging earthwards. Fortunately, as the gondola reached lower altitudes, all three occupants were able to exit and safely parachute to earth shortly before it crashed.

== World War II ==
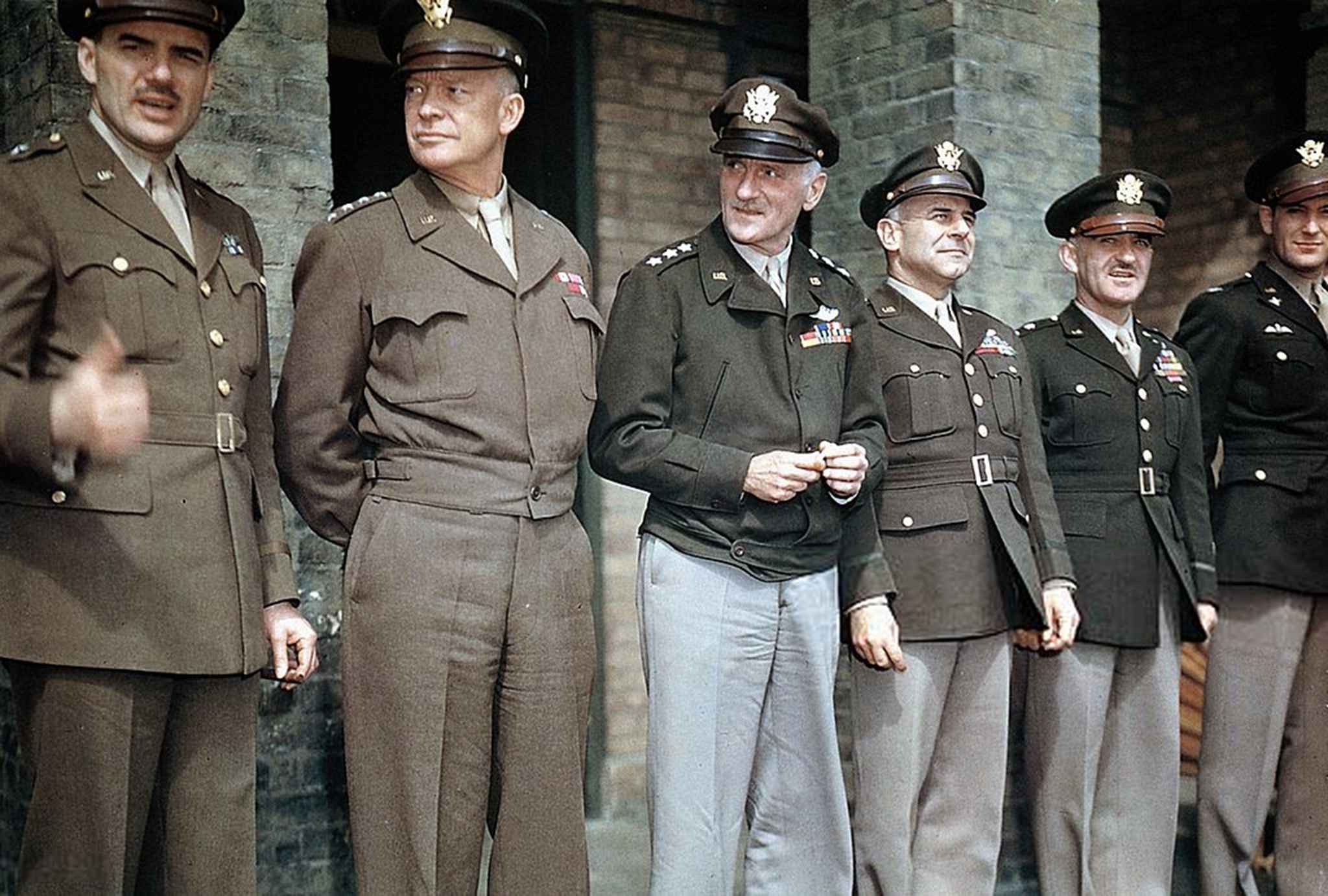
Brigadier General Auton, General Eisenhower, General Spaatz, General Doolittle, Major General William Kepner and Colonel Blakeslee in Debden, England.

Ascending through the ranks, in February 1942 he was eventually promoted to major general in April 1943, and in September of that year took command of VIII Fighter Command in the European Theatre.

Prior to leaving for Europe, Kepner had been a key figure in demanding increased fuel capacity in aircraft like the P-38 Lightning and P-51 Mustang. He visited North American Aviation and Lockheed to demand fuel be put into the wings of the aircraft, only to be told it couldn't be done. When he insisted they comply, complaints by the companies to Material Division (Wright Field) resulted in a threat to have charges laid against him for tampering with aircraft specifications. Fortunately, he was backed by Maj Gen Barney Giles and the modifications went ahead. These later proved critical in enabling the USAAF to introduce fighters with sufficient range to enable escort of bombers on deep penetration missions into Germany.

On arrival in Europe, he supervised the vital role that the fighters played both as guardians of the 8th Air Force's bombers and as ground-attack support for ground forces, not least in the crucial period around D-Day.

In August 1944, Kepner took command of the 8th Air Force's 2nd Bomb Division. During the war he flew 24 combat missions in fighters and bombers and received various decorations from his own country and also from several allied nations.

== Post war ==
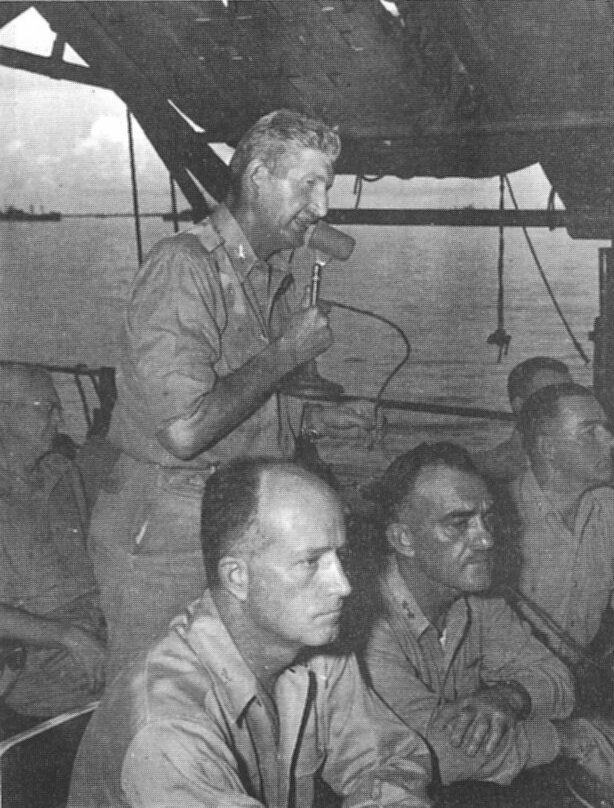
News conference on board USS Appalachian during Operation Crossroads; foreground: Admiral William S. Parsons, Major General William E. Kepner, Vice Admiral William H. P. Blandy. Colonel Stafford L. Warren holds the microphone.

Immediately after the war he took command of the 12th Tactical Air Command. Various appointments followed, including command of the Atomic Energy Division, U.S. Air Force Headquarters. In 1950, Kepner was promoted to the rank of lieutenant general and became commander-in-chief of US Air Force Alaska Command.

He retired from military service on 28 February 1953, and after moving to Orlando, Florida, died there on 3 July 1982.
