= Pennington County Courthouse =

- U.S. National Register of Historic Places
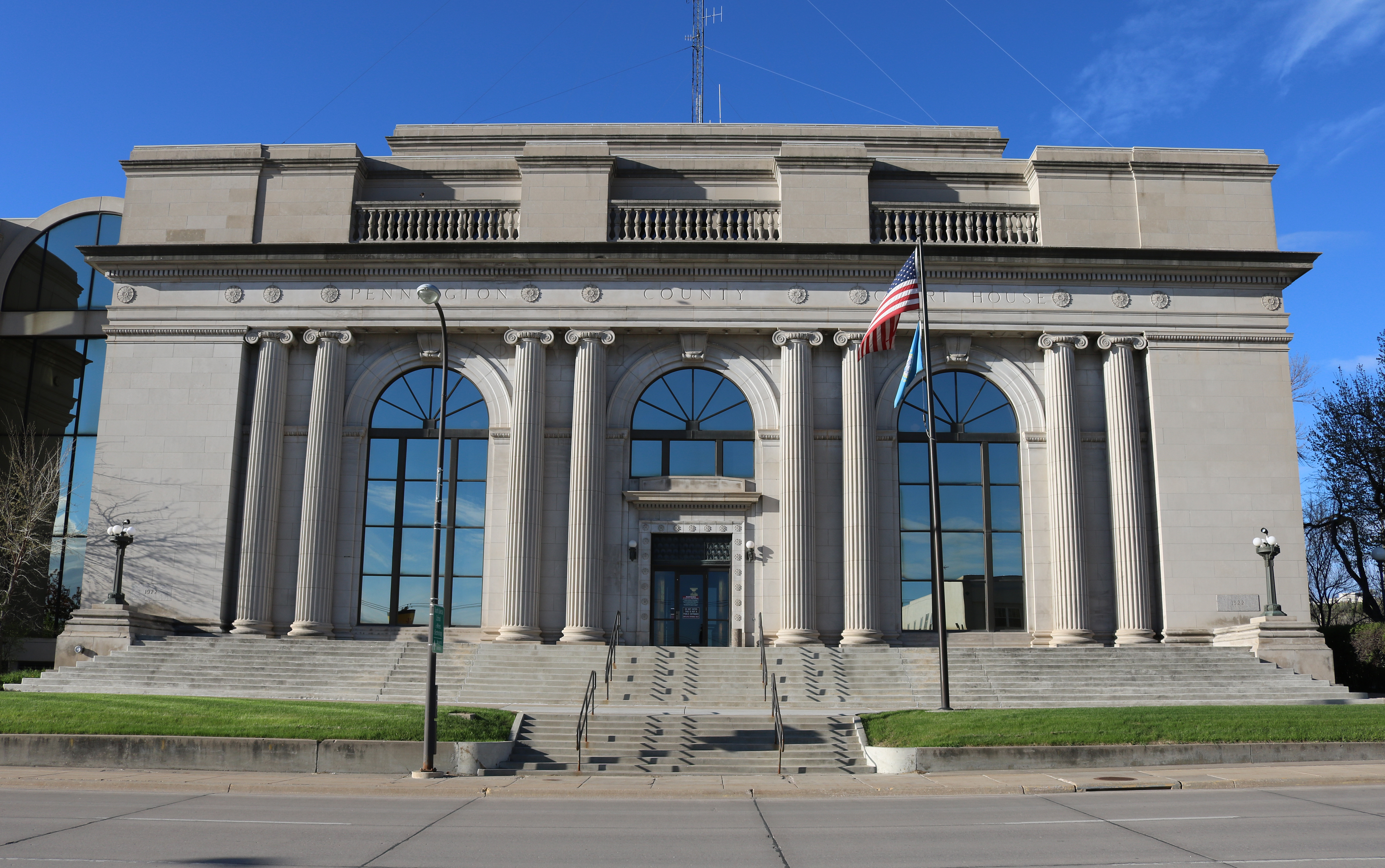
- The courthouse in 2017

- Location within South Dakota Location within the United States
- Interactive map showing the location of Pennington County Courthouse
- Location: 315 St. Joseph St., Rapid City, South Dakota
- Coordinates: 44°4′44″N 103°13′21″W
- Area: 0.5 acres (0.20 ha)
- Built: 1922
- Architect: W. E. Hulse & Company
- Architectural style: Beaux Arts
- NRHP reference No.: 76001751
- Added to NRHP: May 28, 1976

The Pennington County Courthouse, located at 315 St. Joseph Street in Rapid City, is the county courthouse serving Pennington County, South Dakota. The courthouse has functioned as the seat of Pennington County government since it was built in 1922. Architecture firm W. E. Hulse & Company of Hutchinson, Kansas designed the building in the Beaux-Arts style. The three-story building is built from Indiana limestone and has terra cotta trim. The two-story front entrance is divided into sections by four pairs of Ionic columns; three large arched windows decorated with muntin and topped by keystones decorate the three main sections. The entrance, located at what would be the bottom of the middle window, features iron grilles on its windows and transom and is topped by a cartouche. A frieze with ornamental medallions and a dentillated cornice surround the building above its second story.

The courthouse was added to the National Register of Historic Places on May 28, 1976.
