= Explorer II =

1935 American high-altitude balloon

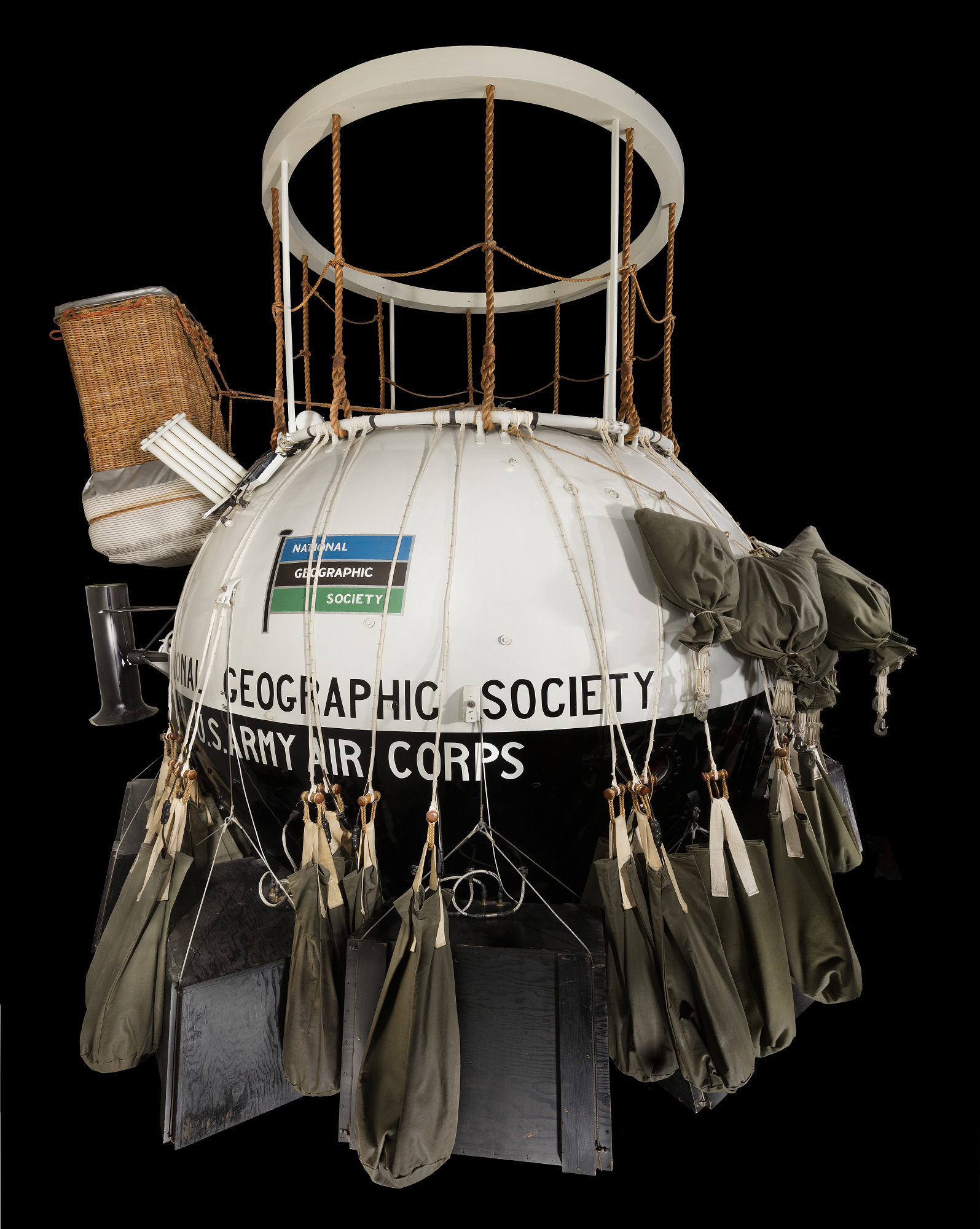
- Explorer II gondola at the National Air and Space Museum
- National origin: United States
- Mass: 6,800 kg (15,000 lb)
- Balloon volume: 100,000 m^{3} (3,700,000 cu ft)
- Crew: 2
- Purpose: Stratospheric flight
- Operator: National Geographic Society; U. S. Army Air Corps
- First flight: July 10, 1935
- Maximum altitude: 22,066 m (72,395 ft)
- Status: Retired

Explorer II was a crewed U.S. high-altitude balloon that was launched on November 11, 1935, and reached a record altitude of 22,066 m (72,395 ft). Launched at 8:00 am from the Stratobowl in South Dakota, the helium balloon lifted a two-man crew consisting of U.S. Army Air Corps Captains Albert W. Stevens and Orvil A. Anderson inside a pressurized spherical gondola suspended beneath it. The crew landed safely near White Lake, South Dakota, at 4:13 pm and the two crewmen were acclaimed as national heroes. Scientific instruments carried in and outside the gondola returned useful information about the stratosphere. The mission was funded by the membership of the National Geographic Society.

== Background ==
In January 1934, the National Geographic Society (NGS) and the U.S. Army Air Corps (USAAC) decided to collaborate on a program to build and launch a manned balloon to a then record altitude of 24 km (15 mi). This vehicle would be capable of carrying a crew of three and a laboratory of scientific instruments in a pressurized gondola suspended beneath the balloon itself. The hydrogen balloon, named Explorer, was completed by July at a cost of around $60,000; equivalent to $1,444,030 in 2025 currency.

The balloon, with three USAAC officers--Major William Ellsworth Kepner, pilot; Captain Anderson, co-pilot; and Captain Stevens, the driving force behind the mission, as scientific observer--aboard, was launched from a canyon in the Black Hills of South Dakota—dubbed the Stratobowl—on July 28, 1934 and reached a near-record altitude of 18,475 m (60,613 ft) before tears in the fabric led the crew to begin reducing their altitude. A rupture in the balloon resulted in a precipitous descent, followed by a spark that caused the hydrogen to ignite and destroy what was left of the balloon, leaving the capsule to plummet toward the ground at terminal velocity. The crew just managed to escape using their parachutes, with the last man bailing out at 500 feet (150 m) above the ground. Their capsule was almost completely destroyed upon impact.

The crash resulted in a national embarrassment, leading Captain Stevens to lobby for another attempt with an improved balloon to be named Explorer II. But news of the fatal crash of a Russian stratospheric attempt in 1934 left President Gilbert H. Grosvenor of the NGS sobered by the risk. A review of the crash by the National Bureau of Standards (NBS) was held between July and September, revealing that the balloon had not opened symmetrically during the ascent, causing stresses that led to the fabric tears. A month-long delay prior to launch had allowed the rubberized cotton to stick together, which created the uneven expansion. The hydrogen explosion followed when the gas in the bag mixed with the oxygen in the atmosphere.

== Preparation ==
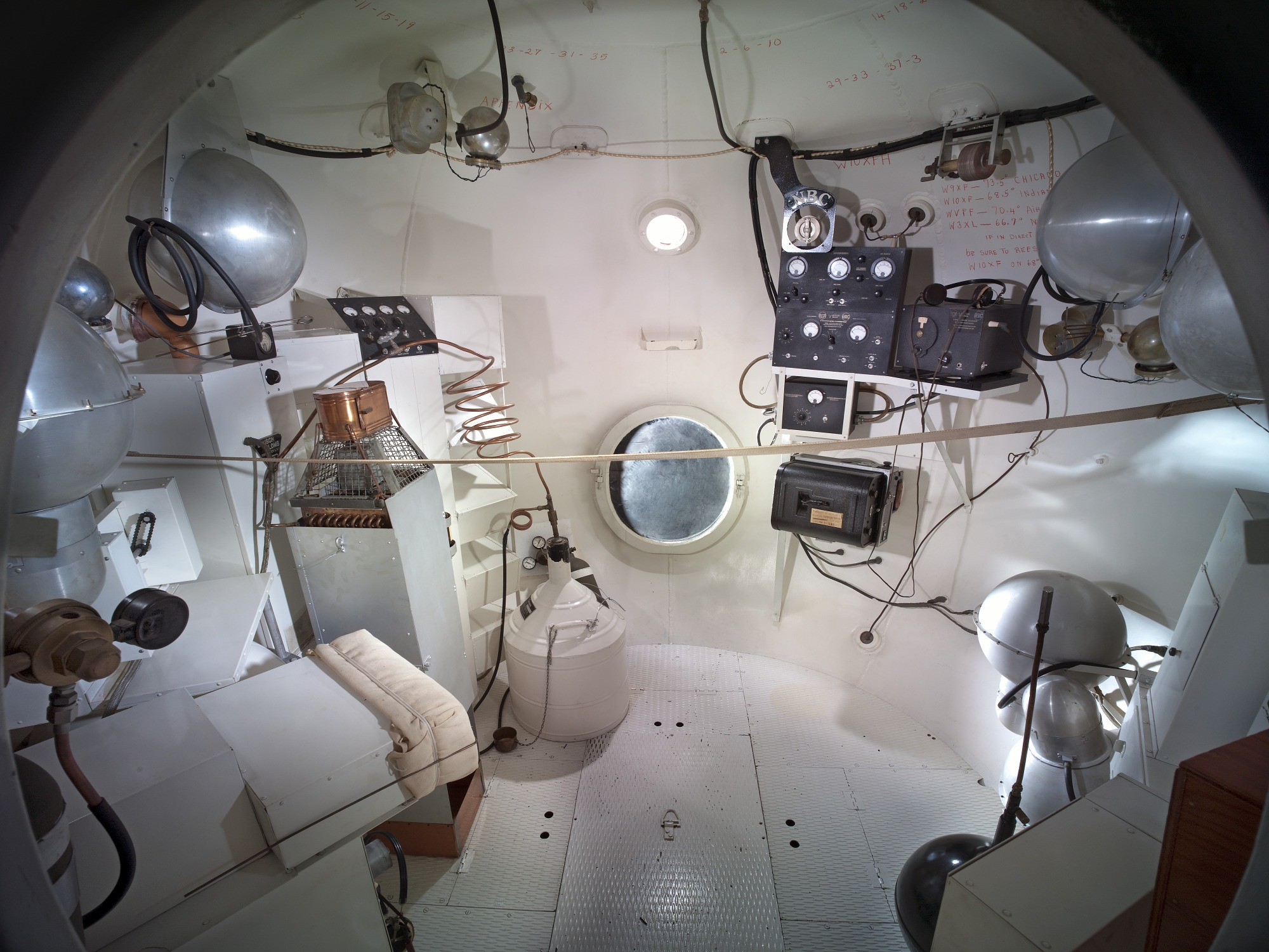
Interior of the Explorer II spherical cabin

Despite the concerns, in 1935 the NGS and Army Air Corps decided to make another attempt. To eliminate the hazard of the hydrogen lifting gas, it was decided instead to use helium—to which the United States had a monopoly. The lower lifting efficiency of helium gas meant that a larger balloon would be needed, so Goodyear-Zeppelin increased the volume to 100,000 m^{3} (3,700,000 cu ft). Dow Chemical Company assembled a larger, lighter gondola made of "Dowmetal"—a magnesium-aluminium alloy—that would carry a two-man crew with a reduced amount of scientific instrumentation. The cabin was 2.7 m (9 ft) in diameter with a mass of 290 kg (640 lb) and could transport a 680 kg (1,500 lb) payload. It was manufactured from a single, large plate that was cut up into form that could be reshaped and welded into a sphere. In order to make crew escape easier, the portholes were made wider than on the Explorer I. The atmosphere in the interior of the capsule was supplied from liquid air instead of liquid oxygen in order to reduce the fire hazard. The modified balloon was ready by the spring of 1935 and the first launch occurred July 10, 1935. Unfortunately, this too proved a failure with the balloon rupturing at liftoff.

Following a review by the NBS, the balloon was prepared for another attempt after Goodyear strengthened the material. Examination of climatological data for the Stratobowl collected over the previous fifteen years was examined, and it was determined that the month of October typically had periods of good weather that would last sufficiently long for a flight attempt. A team of meteorologists was assembled at the Stratobowl in early September and they proceeded to put together a weather station. The meteorological requirements for the launch was for clear skies—with no precipitation—lasting for the duration of the flight, as well as surface wind speeds that were not to exceed 23 km/h (14 mph).

With a cold front approaching, on the night of November 10, 1935, the balloon was prepared for launch. The temperature dropped to −14 °C (6 °F) overnight, so the 10,762.4 m^{2} (115,845 sq ft) of fabric was kept warm and pliable through the use of stoves. The task of inflating the balloon with helium from the 1,685 steel cylinders took eight hours, during which the team needed to repair a 5.2 m (17 ft) long tear that formed in the fabric. Once inflated, the balloon stood 96 m (316 ft) tall. The gondola was kept anchored to the earth by a team of more than 100 soldiers holding cables. Preparations were complete by 7:01 am the following morning and the conditions were deemed suitable for a launch.

== Flight ==
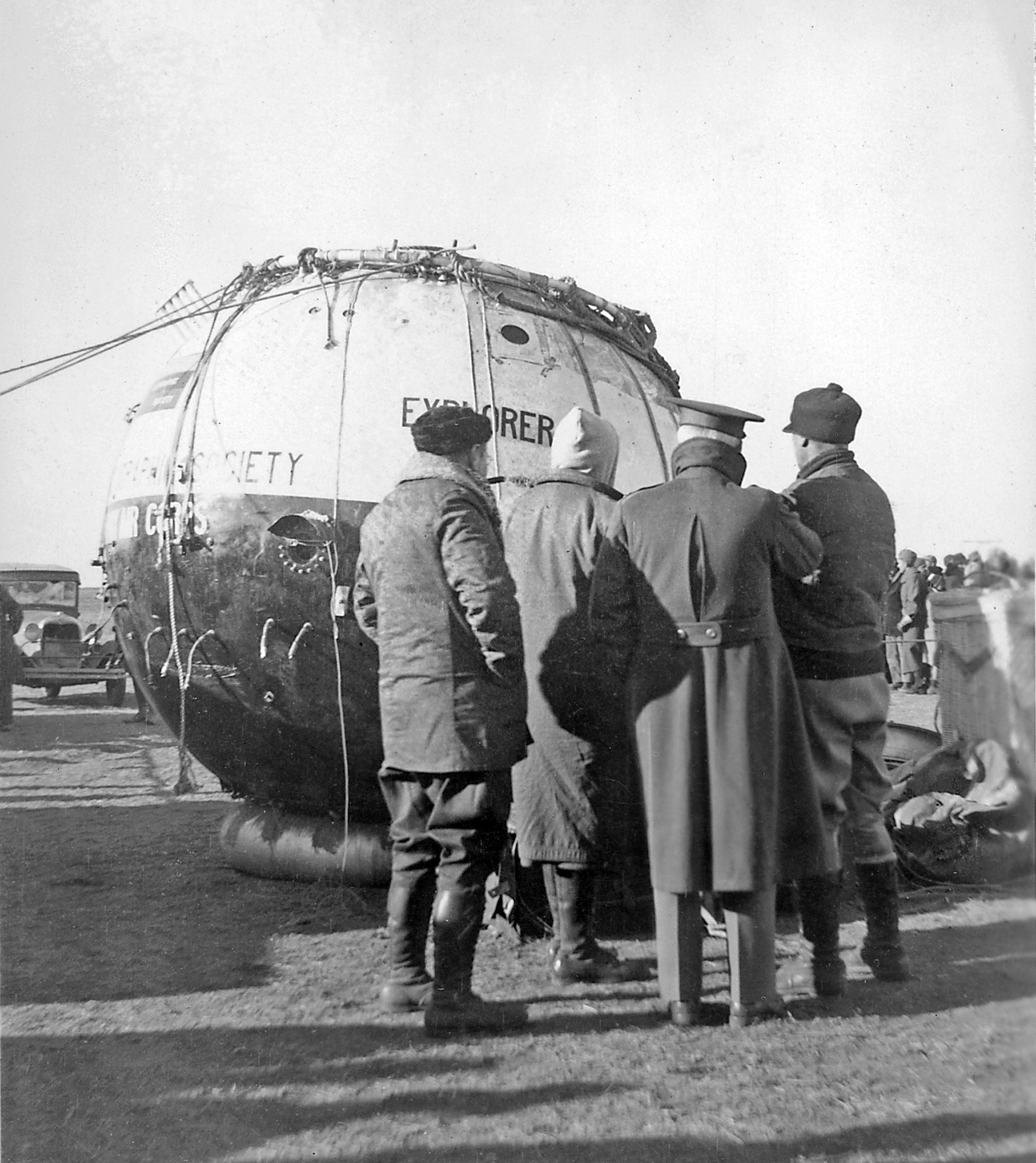
Explorer II gondola at the landing site

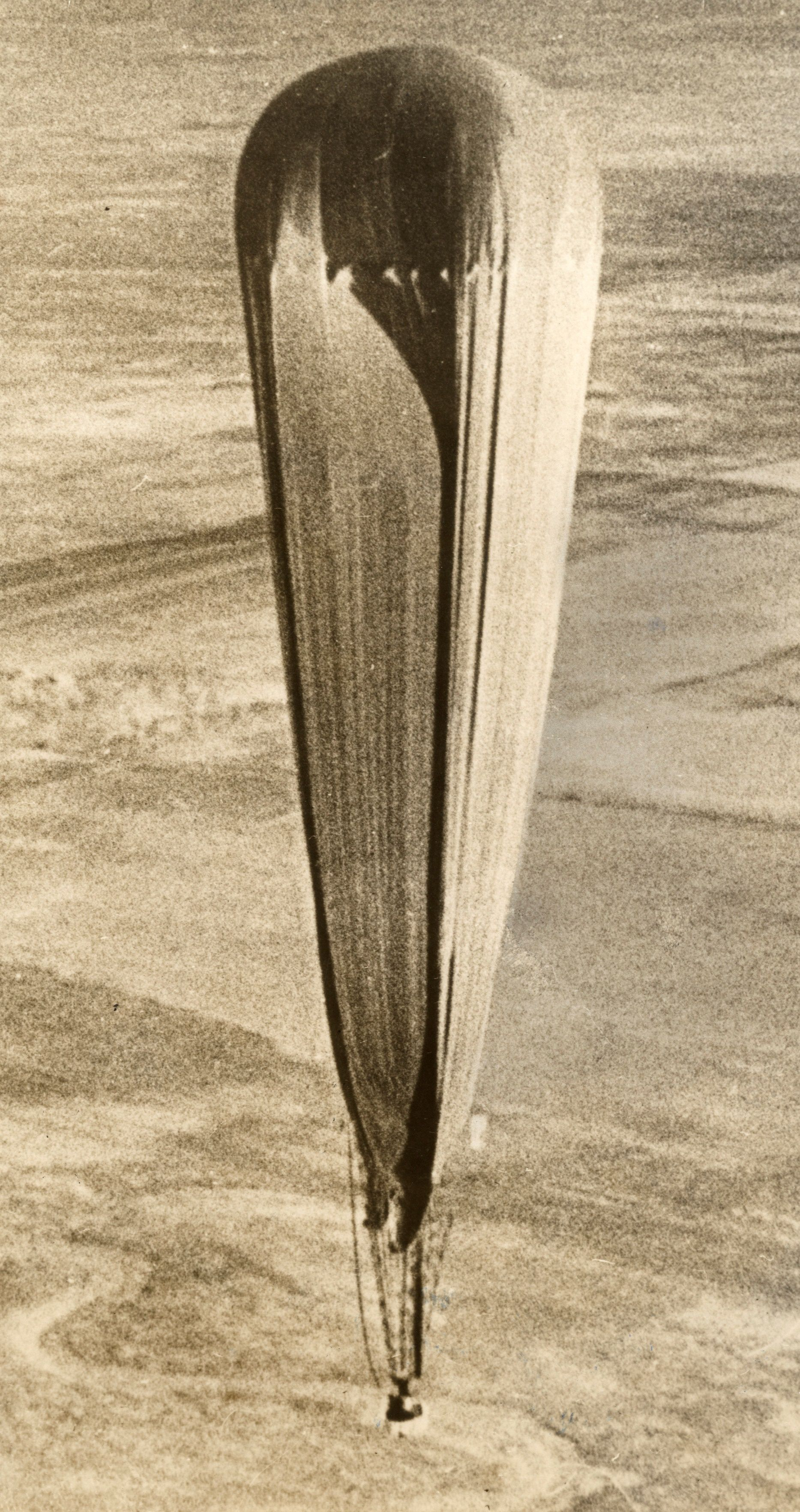
Explorer II in ascent at 7,000m

The crew of the Explorer II consisted of Captain Albert W. Stevens, in command of the mission, and Captain Orvil A. Anderson. A crowd of around 20,000 viewers gathered to watch the event. (The local residents had raised and contributed $13,000 for the mission.) Lift-off occurred at precisely 8:00 am with the release of 34 kg (75 lb) of ballast made of fine lead shot. A few moments after liftoff, wind shear propelled the balloon into a side canyon, but thereafter it ascended normally.

The Explorer II reached a peak altitude of 22,066 m (72,395 ft) at 12:30 pm and remained there for 80 minutes. This set a new world altitude record, and one that would last for nearly two decades. The crew became the first humans to document the curvature of the Earth. Unfortunately, the fan that was to be used to rotate the gondola proved ineffective at that altitude, so they were unable to avoid the Sun's glare. This made viewing from one side of the capsule nearly useless. Despite this, Captain Stevens reported seeing details of the Earth's surface for hundreds of miles. They were too high up to be able to view any movement on the ground, but their photography showed the potential of high-altitude reconnaissance balloons.

Explorer II included communications equipment, and constant radio contact was maintained throughout the flight with the signal being broadcast across the U.S. and in Europe. The onboard instruments collected data on cosmic rays, the ozone distribution and electrical conductivity of the atmosphere at different altitudes, the atmospheric composition of the stratosphere, and the luminosity of the Sun, Moon and Earth. In addition, microorganisms were collected from the stratosphere. Mold samples were carried along to determine the effects of cosmic ray exposure. Stevens took along a camera to take pictures, including the first ever motion pictures shot from the stratosphere. The collected data showed that the ozone in the upper atmosphere was effective at blocking most of the ultraviolet radiation from the Sun. It was also found that the percentage of oxygen at the peak altitude was about the same as that at sea level.

Finally, the descent was begun and it proceeded normally. At an altitude of 300 m (1,000 ft), the crew began releasing scientific instruments that would descend by their own parachutes. This was done to protect the data in case the gondola had a rough landing. The precautions proved unnecessary as the balloon landed gently in an open field near the town of White Lake, South Dakota at 4:13 pm.

== Aftermath ==
The success of the mission was much celebrated in the press and the aeronauts were invited to an audience with U.S. President Franklin D. Roosevelt. They became national heroes and both men were presented with the Hubbard Medal of the National Geographic Society by General John J. Pershing. The Air Corps awarded them the Mackay Trophy for the most meritorious flight of the year. Both men were also awarded the Distinguished Flying Cross for each of the Explorer flights.

Scientific observations made during the mission were highly successful and much data was collected, with the results appearing in scientific journals. The data and the crew experiences were later used when designing flight crew equipment and methods for high-altitude combat operations during World War II. The balloon used for the Explorer II expedition was reportedly cut up into a million strips and distributed as commemorative bookmarks among the NGS members who supported the mission. The gondola is on display at the Smithsonian Institution's National Air and Space Museum.

== See also ==
- Flight altitude record

Preceded by Osoaviakhim-1	Human altitude record 1935-1951	Succeeded by Bill Bridgeman
