= Mystic, South Dakota =

Ghost town in South Dakota, U.S.

Mystic
- Ghost town
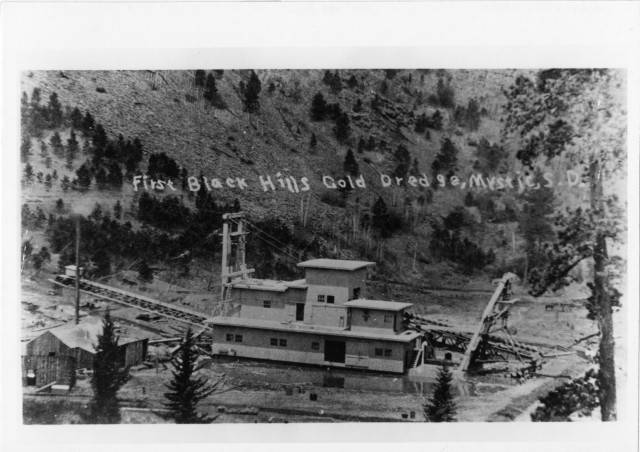
- Gold dredge at Mystic, South Dakota, c. 1910

- Location within South Dakota Location within the United States
- Coordinates: 44°04′37″N 103°38′30″W
- Country: United States
- State: South Dakota
- County: Pennington
- Founded: 1876
- Elevation: 4,872 ft (1,485 m)

Population
  - Total: 0
- Mystic Townsite Historic District
- U.S. National Register of Historic Places
- U.S. Historic district
- Area: 43 acres (17 ha)
- NRHP reference No.: 86002093
- Added to NRHP: August 1, 1986

Mystic is a ghost town in Pennington County, South Dakota. It began as a placer mining encampment called Sitting Bull in 1876, later attracting multiple railroads to the area. Its population began to decline in the early 20th century, and it now has few to no permanent residents. The old townsite was added to the National Register of Historic Places in 1986 under the name Mystic Townsite Historic District.

== Geography ==
Mystic is located in the Black Hills in Pennington County, South Dakota. It is on Castle Creek, about 20 miles (32 km) west of Rapid City and 12 miles (19 km) north of Hill City, at the intersection of Mystic Road/County Road 231 and George Frink Road. A trailhead located at Mystic provides access to the George S. Mickelson Trail. Aside from a few original sheds and summer cottages, the main feature left in the settlement is the McCahan Memorial Chapel, built in 1930 and closed in 1966.

== History ==
=== Establishment ===
The first white settlement on the site was a gold placer mining camp established alongside Castle Creek in 1876, which the settlers called Sitting Bull after the Lakota chief. In addition to panning for gold, other settlers began to set up mineshafts in the surrounding hills. Although some miners redirected their efforts to Deadwood, the camp maintained a steady population; by 1879, about 100 people lived in Sitting Bull.

In 1889, the settlement was renamed Mystic, for unknown reasons. Some authors speculate that the settlers supposed that the local Native Americans believed the surrounding area to be full of mystery. Others believe the settlement was named after Mystic, Connecticut. In the same year, the Chicago, Burlington and Quincy Railroad built a railway to the settlement, connecting it to Deadwood. In 1906, the Rapid City, Black Hills and Western Railroad, also known as the Crouch Line, arrived in Mystic, which became the western terminus of the Mystic line to Rapid City. The Mystic post office was established in 1895.

=== Growth ===
Mystic's convenient situation for placer mining attracted several experimental ventures. In June 1911, at a cost of $100,000, the Castle Creek Hydraulic Gold Mining Company established the first gold dredge—also the first electric placer mining dredge—in the Black Hills about 1.5 miles (2.4 km) upstream of Mystic. This system had a capacity of 55,000 yards (50 km) of material per month, but the cost far exceeded its returns and within a year, the dredge had been removed and relocated to Oregon. In 1904, the Electro-Chemical Reduction Company set up an experimental electrochlorination plant. This plant, called the Mystic Reduction Mill, cost over $1 million to create. By 1913, the operation had failed, and in 1919 its foundation was used for a new sawmill operated by George Frink.

With local mining on the decline, the Frink Sawmill became the town's new main employer. At other points, Mystic had a Presbyterian church, blacksmith, school, and grocery store. It was also home to a Civilian Conservation Corps camp, the highest in the Black Hills, during the Great Depression. The CCC workers planted trees and battled forest fires across the Black Hills. The employees at the camp are estimated to have planted over 1.5 million trees by November 1937.

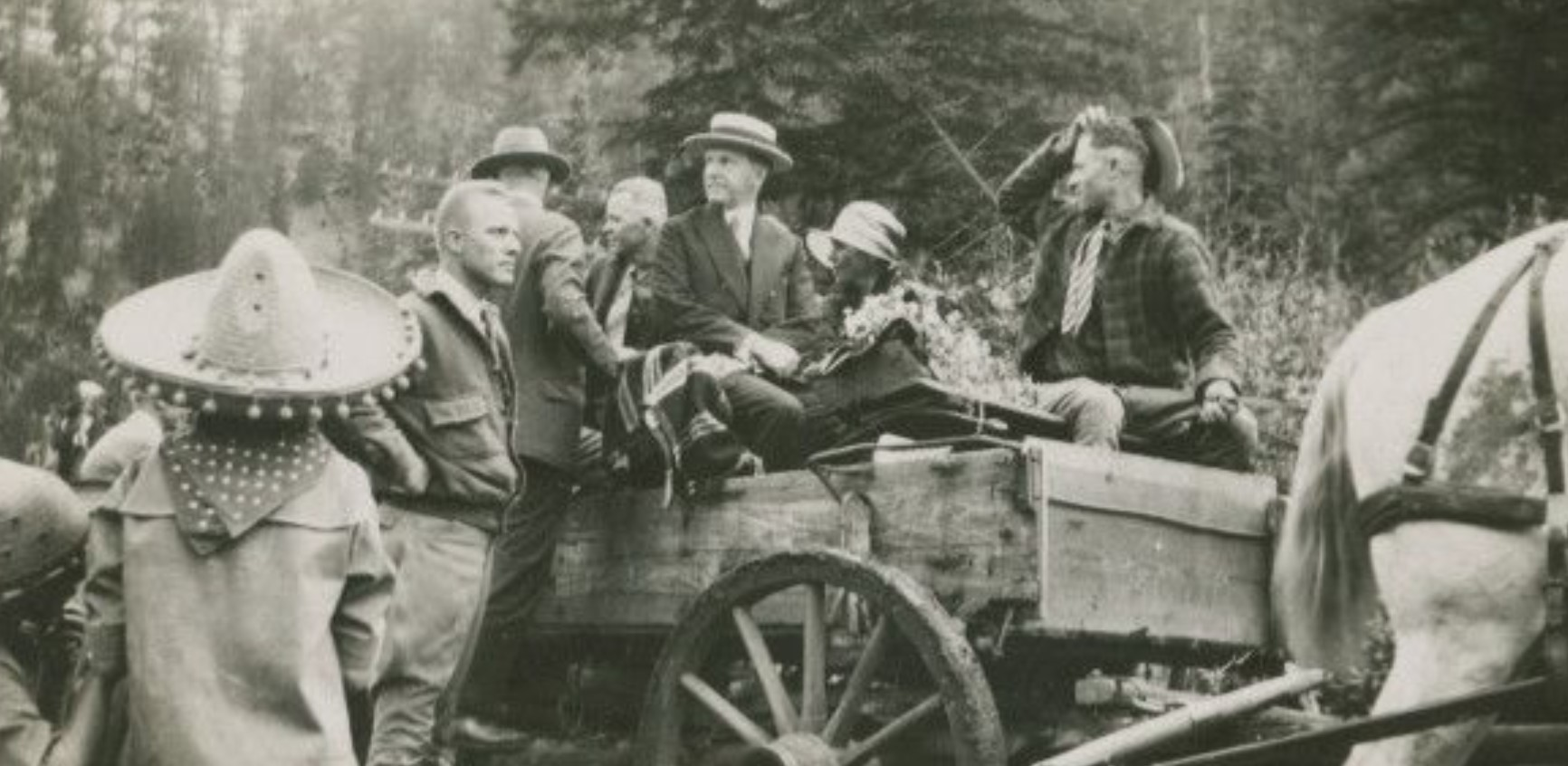
President Calvin Coolidge at Mystic, South Dakota, 1927

At the convergence of two railroad lines, Mystic also attracted significant tourism, and in 1927, during his tour of the Black Hills and Mount Rushmore, President Calvin Coolidge visited Mystic. The Rapid City Daily Journal describes the president and his wife visiting the summer home of former Nebraska Governor Samuel Roy McKelvie by way of Mystic on July 23. The Coolidges arrived in town on the Crouch Line before departing for the McKelvie cottage and were driven part of the way by George Frink in his lumber wagon.

=== Abandonment ===
Mystic had already begun to decline in the early 20th century. Being so close to the creek, the settlement suffered from numerous floods that had continually damaged the railways, buildings, and other infrastructure. Five railroad bridges were washed out during flooding in 1907 but later replaced. Several fires—including multiple wildfires—also threatened the community. The sawmill itself was destroyed by fire in 1936 and rebuilt. Just three years later, a massive fire swept through the Black Hills, destroying several homes around Mystic; George Frink, who was the fire warden at the time, described it as "the worst I've ever seen." Additionally, the town was beginning to run out of easily accessible coal and timber.

After World War II, its abandonment quickened. The Crouch Line was completely dismantled in 1947 and the sawmill closed in 1952. The post office followed two years later and its operations consolidated into the nearby Rochford post office. The Burlington rail line closed in November 1983 and today forms part of the George S. Mickelson Trail. Today, no permanent houses are occupied in Mystic.

On August 1, 1986, 43 acres (17 ha) of the original townsite were added to the National Register of Historic Places; however, the exact area and details of contributing properties are restricted.
