= Rockerville, South Dakota =

- Place
- View of Rockerville, July 2006

- Location of Rockerville in South Dakota.
- Coordinates: 43°57′29″N 103°21′31″W
- Country: United States
- State: South Dakota
- County: Pennington
- Elevation: 4,370 ft (1,332 m)
- Time zone: UTC-7 (MST)
  - Summer (DST): UTC-6 (MDT)
- Area code: 605
- GNIS feature ID: 5768511

Rockerville is a small unincorporated community in Pennington County in the Black Hills of the U.S. state of South Dakota. Originally established as a mining camp, it was named for the "rockers" which were used to separate placer gold from stream gravel.

== History ==
Rockerville was founded in 1876 as the result of a gold rush.

It was a tourist town in the 1950s and 1960s because of its key location on US Highway 16 between Rapid City and Mount Rushmore National Memorial. It had a variety of tourist attractions, including a "Mellerdrammer" (Melodrama) live theatre, a "Ghost town" of various buildings with tourist shops and small amusements, "It's a Small World" Museum (featuring an 1880 Tiny Town model and other miniature collections), a motel, campgrounds and RV parks. However, in the conversion of US Highway 16 to four lanes in the mid-1960s, the original townsite was placed between the two separate roadways, as there was no way to widen the original highway through the town without completely destroying it. With construction of at least three exits into the town from both directions, the town continued to be a vibrant tourist attraction in the 1970s and 1980s. The tourist could take in daily wild west shows, shootouts, stagecoach rides and gold panning. Fine dining was and still is available at the Gaslight Restaurant. Travelers could stay in town at the local Trading Post Motel, buy groceries and gas up their cars at the Rockerville Trading Post.

In the 1990s, the town virtually died, as a lack of visibility to tourists. The 55 mph speed limits on the highway contributed to motorists driving past the town without stopping, sending the economy into a nosedive from which it never recovered. The only remaining business within the generally accepted city limits is the Gaslight Saloon, which was recently rebuilt after a devastating fire. Virtually all the older tourist-era businesses have long since closed, fallen into decay, and been demolished (except for a group of still-standing log cabins just east of the Gaslight). This severe local economic damage today is sometimes referred to in South Dakota as "Rockerville Syndrome" and has had a significant bearing in the construction of new bypasses and highway improvements as recently as 1998 and 2001, in and around such small towns as Hill City and Corson.

== Geography ==
Today, several subdivisions and rural residential areas have been built around Rockerville, which also has a sawmill and other commercial activities, leaving the small town rather like a doughnut. It is located close enough to Rapid City, Hill City, and Keystone to serve as a bedroom community. A larger commercial area has grown up on US Highway 16 approximately 1 mile east, known as "East Rockerville" or "Rockerville Flats" with various tourist-oriented businesses and more residential areas.

To the west, on the old alignment of US Highway 16, now called Silver Mountain Road, is the rural community of Silver Mountain, including Storm Mountain Center, a United Methodist camping facility. The Flume Trail, a hiking trail following the alignment and remains of a water flume built to provide water for those gold rockers in the 1880s, connects Rockerville, Storm Mountain, and Boulder Hills with Sheridan Lake, deeper in the Hills. Also, the west is Beretta Gulch, US Forest Service land well known to locals as a popular shooting range, and the Keystone Wye, where US 16 and US 16A divide, and famous for what was once the world's largest timber arch bridge.

== Stratosphere Bowl ==
Off U.S. Route 16, geographically located 1.5 miles (2.4 km) northeast of Rockerville bearing 2 miles (3.2 km) southwest of Colonial Pine Hills, is the Stratosphere Bowl. A geological depression located in the narrow middle valley of Spring Creek, made famous in the 1930s serving as a discharge site for the Explorer II being two US Army and Smithsonian Institution balloon launches sending men to the Stratosphere. The Stratobowl is located at 43°58′36″N 103°20′43″W.

== Government ==
Rockerville's only organized government is the Rockerville Fire District, which protects the area. Otherwise, government services are provided by Pennington County.
