= Creighton, South Dakota =

Unincorporated community in South Dakota, U.S.

Coordinates: 44°15′18″N 102°12′29″W

Creighton is an unincorporated community in Pennington County, in the U.S. state of South Dakota.

== History ==
Creighton was laid out in 1909, and named after Creighton, Nebraska, the native home of the first settlers. A post office called Creighton was established in 1908, and remained in operation until 1984.
