= Myers City, South Dakota =

Myers City, South Dakota Myersville
- Ghost town
- Location of Myers City within South Dakota
- Coordinates: 44.1033164°N 103.7390858°W
- Country: United States
- State: South Dakota
- County: Pennington
- Named after: John Myers
- Elevation: 5,732 ft (1,747 m)

Population (2010)
  - Total: 0
- Time zone: UTC-7 (Mountain Time Zone (MST))
  - Summer (DST): UTC-6 (MDT)

Myers City, today called Myersville, is a ghost town in Pennington County, South Dakota, United States.

== Naming ==
Myers City was named for John Myers, who was a local miner and lumberman.

== History ==
Myers City started out as a mining town near the Cochrane Mine (formerly the Jenny Lind Mine), which was discovered in 1878 by Frank Cochrane. Cochrane sold the claims to the local Alta Lodi Mining Company. The company built a 40-stamp mill in January 1880, but it wasn't operated until the following summer. The mine and mill were connected by a tramway. In 1884, the Alta Lodi shut down for cleaning purposes and repairs, but it was never reopened. The mill was later moved to the nearby town of Lookout.

In 1880, the census recorded 103 residents. By 1883, 150 people were living in Myers City, and at some point, the town had about 200 residents. The only preacher to ever give a sermon in a Deadwood bar, Reverend Rumney, is buried in the town cemetery. This sermon was given in Billy Nuttall's #10 saloon. The town never had a post office or any saloons; most of its residents travelled to Custer or Rochford for drinks or mail. From 1892 to 1917, James Cochran worked 5 claims in the area, running a 16-ton Huntington mill. In 1902, Cochran sold the claims for $25,000, but he soon repossessed the property. From 1931 to 1936, after Cochran's death in 1930, his son-in-law and grandson worked the claims and built a new mill. The last time the area was worked was briefly by a man named Driscoll in 1936. Some buildings are still standing.

== Geography ==
Myers City is located in the Black Hills of Pennington County, at 44.1033164°N 103.7390858°W. It is approximately 2.5 miles southwest of Rochford.
