= Ajax, South Dakota =

Populated place in South Dakota, US

Coordinates: 43°53′51″N 103°10′55″W

Ajax is an unincorporated community in Pennington County, in the U.S. state of South Dakota.

The community was named for Ajax, a hero in Greek mythology.
