= Albert William Stevens =

American Army officer and photographer

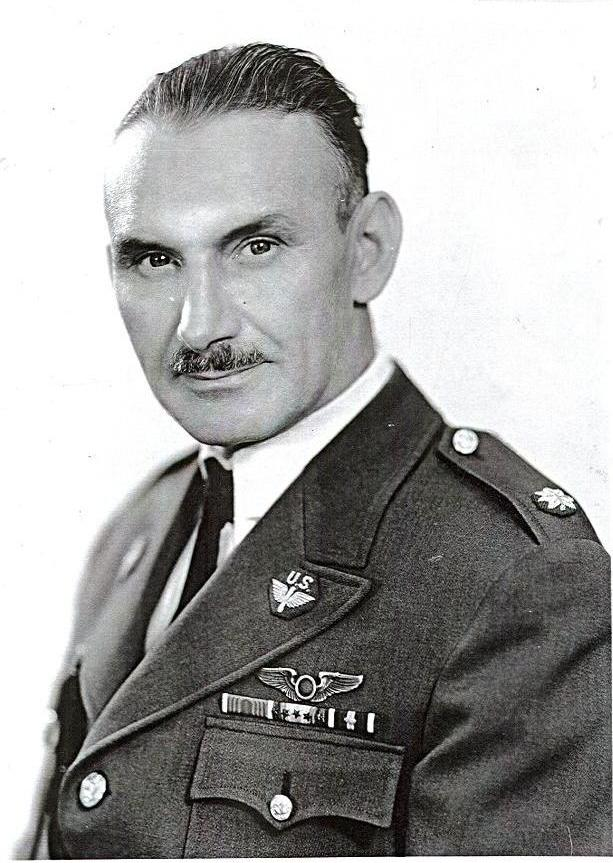
- Born: March 13, 1886 Belfast, Maine, U.S.
- Died: March 26, 1949 (aged 63) Redwood City, California, U.S.
- Allegiance: United States
- Branch: Army Air Corps
- Rank: Captain
- Commands: Explorer II
- Wars: World War II
- Awards: Distinguished Flying Cross × 2; Hubbard Medal (1935); Mackay Trophy (1935)

Albert William Stevens (March 13, 1886 – March 26, 1949) was an officer of the United States Army Air Corps, balloonist, and aerial photographer.

== Biography ==
He was born on March 13, 1886, in Belfast, Maine. He graduated from the University of Maine in 1909 with a master's degree in electrical engineering.

While flying over South America in 1930, Stevens took the first photograph of the Earth in a way that the horizon's curvature is visible. To photograph through haze, Stevens often employed infrared-sensitive film for long-distance aerial photography.

Accompanied by Lieutenant Charles D. McAllister of the Army Air Corps, Stevens took the first photograph of the Moon's shadow projected onto the Earth during a solar eclipse in August 1932.

On July 29, 1934, Stevens and two other Army Air Corps officers, Major William Kepner and Captain Orvil Arson Anderson, ascended in a specially-constructed balloon and gondola named Explorer I over north-western Nebraska in an attempt to exceed the current altitude record for manned flight. However, nearing the current record height, the balloon envelope ruptured, sending the gondola plunging to earth. All three crew were able to eventually exit and parachute to earth before the gondola crashed into a farm field.

On November 11, 1935, Stevens, along with Captain Anderson, made a record balloon ascent from the "Stratobowl" (a natural depression) near Rapid City, South Dakota. There were 20,000 spectators, while millions of people listened to a live NBC radio broadcast. Their sealed gondola Explorer II floated to 72,395 feet (22,066 m), nearly 14 miles (23 km), a world altitude record unequaled until 1946 and a balloon record unequaled until 1956.

Stevens was twice awarded the Distinguished Flying Cross – one award for each of his two famous balloon flights.

He died on March 26, 1949, in Redwood City, California.

== See also ==
- Flight altitude record
