= Tigerville, South Dakota =

Tigerville, South Dakota Tiger City
- Ghost town
- Location of Tigerville in South Dakota.
- Coordinates: 43.9766509°N 103.6399165°W
- Country: United States of America
- State: South Dakota
- County: Pennington
- Founded: 1878
- Abandoned: 1885
- Named for: Bengal Tiger Mine or the Lucky Tiger mining claims
- Elevation: 5,485 ft (1,672 m)

Population (2013)
  - Total: 0
- Time zone: UTC-7 (MST)
  - Summer (DST): UTC-6 (MDT)

Tigerville or Tiger City (1878–1885) is a ghost town in the Black Hills of Pennington County, South Dakota, United States. The old mining town exemplifies the boom-and-bust fate of many Western towns.

== Naming ==
The town's name might have come from the Bengal Tiger Mine, located 2–3 miles away. Others say that the name came from the unpatented Lucky Tiger claims Numbers 1, 2, and 3; though these do not show up on maps, locals say that the claims were nearby the town.

== History ==
Tigerville was founded in 1878 in the King Solomon Mine area, which was known for its gold and quartz placer deposits. It had a post office, two stores, three saloons, blacksmith, school, and a stage barn, which was a stop on the Cheyenne-Custer-Deadwood line. The nearby Bengal Tiger Mine, despite reportedly having promising mineral deposits, was never successfully mined. In 1880, the town reached 200 residents, and was able to send six delegates to the South Dakota Republican Convention; seeing as Rapid City, South Dakota had only ten at the time, this was a notable accomplishment for the town. The town eventually grew to about 500 citizens. When the town hit its bust, and the mines closed in 1885, many of the miners settled on nearby ranches or moved to other towns. In 1974, only one house and the sawmill remained.

== Geography ==
Tigerville is located in the Black Hills of western Pennington County. The old town site is located approximately 4.5 miles northwest of Hill City, at the junction of roads leading to Hill City, Deerfield Lake, and Rochford.
