= Sheridan Lake (South Dakota) =

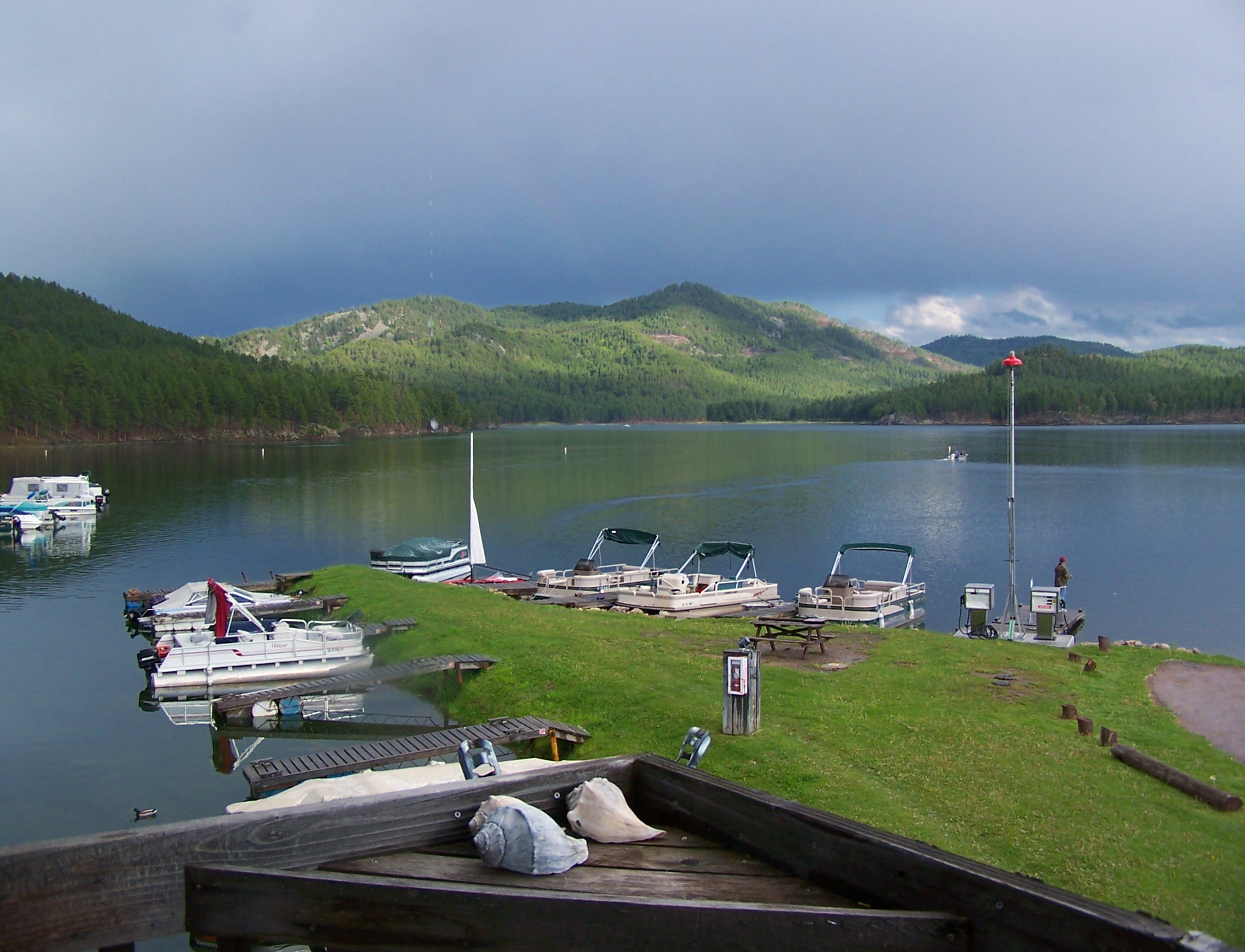
- Sheridan Lake Marina

- Location within South Dakota Location within the United States
- Location: Pennington County, South Dakota
- Coordinates: 43°58′30″N 103°27′04″W
- Type: Reservoir
- Basin countries: United States
- Surface area: 375 acres (152 ha)
- Water volume: 13,395 acre⋅ft (16,522,000 m^{3}) normal 22,043 acre⋅ft (27,190,000 m^{3}) max
- Surface elevation: 4,630 ft (1,410 m)

Sheridan Lake, a reservoir, is located on Spring Creek in Pennington County, South Dakota. Built over the site of Sheridan, the first county seat, it is owned and operated by the United States Forest Service and is one of the recreational areas of the Black Hills National Forest.

== Overview ==
Sheridan Dam was built in 1939 as an earthen structure, 134 feet (41 m) tall with a length of 850 feet (260 m) at its crest. The maximum capacity of the reservoir is 22,043 acre-feet (27,190,000 m^{3}), and the normal storage is 13,395 acre-feet (16,522,000 m^{3}).

Facilities include a marina, improved swimming beach, campground and group campground on the North Shore; campgrounds and swimming beach on the South Shore; and various picnic and overlook areas. The dam across Spring Creek is very small and accessible only on foot. Lake water levels remain constant since the lake is not used for flood control or irrigation.

Sheridan Lake is accessible via U.S. Route 385 north from Hill City, South Dakota and Three Forks or south from Lead and Deadwood, or through a scenic route via Sheridan Lake Drive, a paved county highway, from Rapid City.
