= New Underwood, South Dakota =

New Underwood wóȟešma tȟéča
- City
- New Underwood, South Dakota
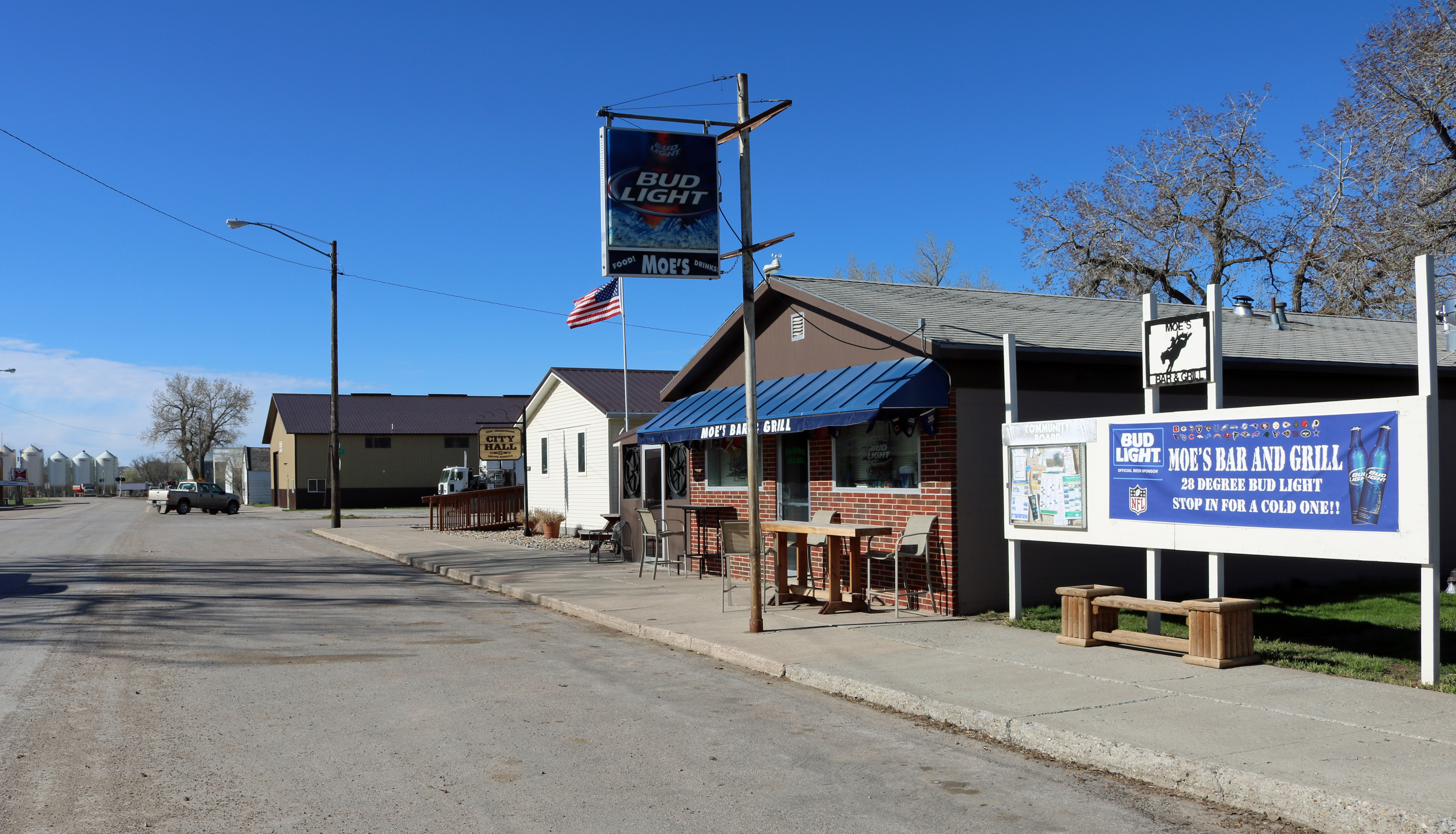
- Moe's Bar and Grill and City Hall in New Underwood.

- Location in Pennington County and the state of South Dakota
- Coordinates: 44°05′59″N 102°50′49″W
- Country: United States
- State: South Dakota
- County: Pennington

Area
  - Total: 1.46 sq mi (3.78 km^{2})
  - Land: 1.46 sq mi (3.78 km^{2})
  - Water: 0 sq mi (0.00 km^{2})
- Elevation: 2,897 ft (883 m)

Population (2020)
  - Total: 590
  - Density: 404.5/sq mi (156.16/km^{2})
- Time zone: UTC-7 (Mountain (MST))
  - Summer (DST): UTC-6 (MDT)
- ZIP code: 57761
- Area code: 605
- FIPS code: 46-45060
- GNIS feature ID: 1267492
- Website: www.newunderwood.com

New Underwood (Lakota: wóȟešma tȟéča; "new undergrowth") is a city in Pennington County, South Dakota, United States. The population was 590 at the 2020 Census.

New Underwood got its start circa 1906. The city was named for John Underwood, a cattleman. Until 2017, it was home to the world’s smallest biker bar, which is now closed.

== Geography ==
According to the United States Census Bureau, the city has a total area of 1.00 square mile (2.59 km^{2}), all land.

== Demographics ==
Historical population
Census	Pop.	Note	%±
1910	134		—
1920	164		22.4%
1930	311		89.6%
1940	214		−31.2%
1950	268		25.2%
1960	462		72.4%
1970	416		−10.0%
1980	517		24.3%
1990	553		7.0%
2000	616		11.4%
2010	660		7.1%
2020	590		−10.6%
U.S. Decennial Census

=== 2020 census ===
As of the 2020 census, New Underwood had a population of 590. The median age was 40.0 years. 23.6% of residents were under the age of 18 and 20.8% of residents were 65 years of age or older. For every 100 females there were 100.7 males, and for every 100 females age 18 and over there were 93.6 males age 18 and over.

0.0% of residents lived in urban areas, while 100.0% lived in rural areas.

There were 237 households in New Underwood, of which 31.2% had children under the age of 18 living in them. Of all households, 40.5% were married-couple households, 25.3% were households with a male householder and no spouse or partner present, and 24.9% were households with a female householder and no spouse or partner present. About 35.5% of all households were made up of individuals and 13.5% had someone living alone who was 65 years of age or older.

There were 268 housing units, of which 11.6% were vacant. The homeowner vacancy rate was 1.1% and the rental vacancy rate was 13.9%.

Racial composition as of the 2020 census
Race	Number	Percent
White	508	86.1%
Black or African American	1	0.2%
American Indian and Alaska Native	33	5.6%
Asian	7	1.2%
Native Hawaiian and Other Pacific Islander	0	0.0%
Some other race	8	1.4%
Two or more races	33	5.6%
Hispanic or Latino (of any race)	13	2.2%

=== 2010 census ===
As of the census of 2010, there were 660 people, 248 households, and 162 families living in the city. The population density was 660.0 inhabitants per square mile (254.8/km^{2}). There were 280 housing units at an average density of 280.0 per square mile (108.1/km^{2}). The racial makeup of the city was 89.5% White, 6.4% Native American, 0.2% Asian, 0.8% from other races, and 3.2% from two or more races. Hispanic or Latino of any race were 2.7% of the population.

There were 248 households, of which 34.3% had children under the age of 18 living with them, 47.6% were married couples living together, 13.7% had a female householder with no husband present, 4.0% had a male householder with no wife present, and 34.7% were non-families. 28.6% of all households were made up of individuals, and 7.6% had someone living alone who was 65 years of age or older. The average household size was 2.47 and the average family size was 3.09.

The median age in the city was 39.9 years. 27.4% of residents were under the age of 18; 6.5% were between the ages of 18 and 24; 23.2% were from 25 to 44; 26.9% were from 45 to 64; and 16.1% were 65 years of age or older. The gender makeup of the city was 50.2% male and 49.8% female.

=== 2000 census ===
As of the census of 2000, there were 616 people, 232 households, and 174 families living in the city. The population density was 616.0 inhabitants per square mile (237.8/km^{2}). There were 265 housing units at an average density of 265.0 per square mile (102.3/km^{2}). The racial makeup of the city was 93.34% White, 5.84% Native American, and 0.81% from two or more races. Hispanic or Latino of any race were 1.14% of the population.

There were 232 households, out of which 40.1% had children under the age of 18 living with them, 53.4% were married couples living together, 14.2% had a female householder with no husband present, and 24.6% were non-families. 20.3% of all households were made up of individuals, and 11.6% had someone living alone who was 65 years of age or older. The average household size was 2.66 and the average family size was 3.02.

In the city, the population was spread out, with 31.3% under the age of 18, 6.2% from 18 to 24, 28.6% from 25 to 44, 20.0% from 45 to 64, and 14.0% who were 65 years of age or older. The median age was 34 years. For every 100 females, there were 97.4 males. For every 100 females age 18 and over, there were 94.9 males.

The median income for a household in the city was $32,750, and the median income for a family was $36,111. Males had a median income of $25,096 versus $21,442 for females. The per capita income for the city was $14,729. About 4.8% of families and 8.0% of the population were below the poverty line, including 6.5% of those under age 18 and 15.2% of those age 65 or over.

== Education ==
The school district is New Underwood School District 51-3.
