= Sheridan Lake (Hubbard County, Minnesota) =

Lake in the state of Minnesota, United States

- Location within Minnesota
- Location: Hubbard County, Minnesota
- Coordinates: 47°10′54″N 94°55′26″W
- Type: lake

Sheridan Lake is a lake in Hubbard County, in the U.S. state of Minnesota.

Sheridan Lake was named for Philip Sheridan, a Union officer in the Civil War.

== See also ==
- List of lakes in Minnesota
