= Orvil A. Anderson =

American soldier and balloonist (1895–1965)

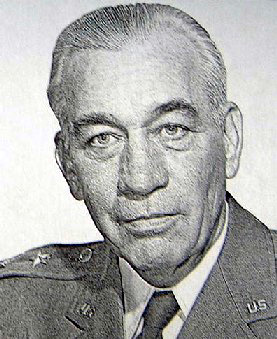
- Born: May 2, 1895; Springville, Utah, US
- Died: August 22, 1965 (aged 70); Montgomery, Alabama, US
- Burial place: Arlington National Cemetery
- Military career
- Allegiance: United States of America
- Branch: United States Air Force; United States Army Air Forces; United States Army Air Corps; United States Army Air Service; Aviation Section, U.S. Signal Corps
- Service years: 1917–1950
- Rank: Major General
- Nickname: "Andy"

Orvil Orson "Andy" Anderson (May 2, 1895 — August 24, 1965) was an American Army and Air Force officer, and a pioneer Army balloonist. In 1935 he and Albert William Stevens won the Mackay Trophy when they set a record of 72,395 feet in their balloon Explorer II.

== Early career ==
On July 28, 1934, he participated in the Explorer I stratospheric balloon fight which reached an altitude of 60,613 feet before he had to bail out due to safety concerns.

In 1935 he and Albert William Stevens won the Mackay Trophy, the Harmon Trophy and the National Geographic Society Hubbard Medal when they set a record of 72,395 feet in their balloon Explorer II.

Anderson received the Distinguished Flying Cross twice, one for each of the two Explorer flights.

== World War II ==
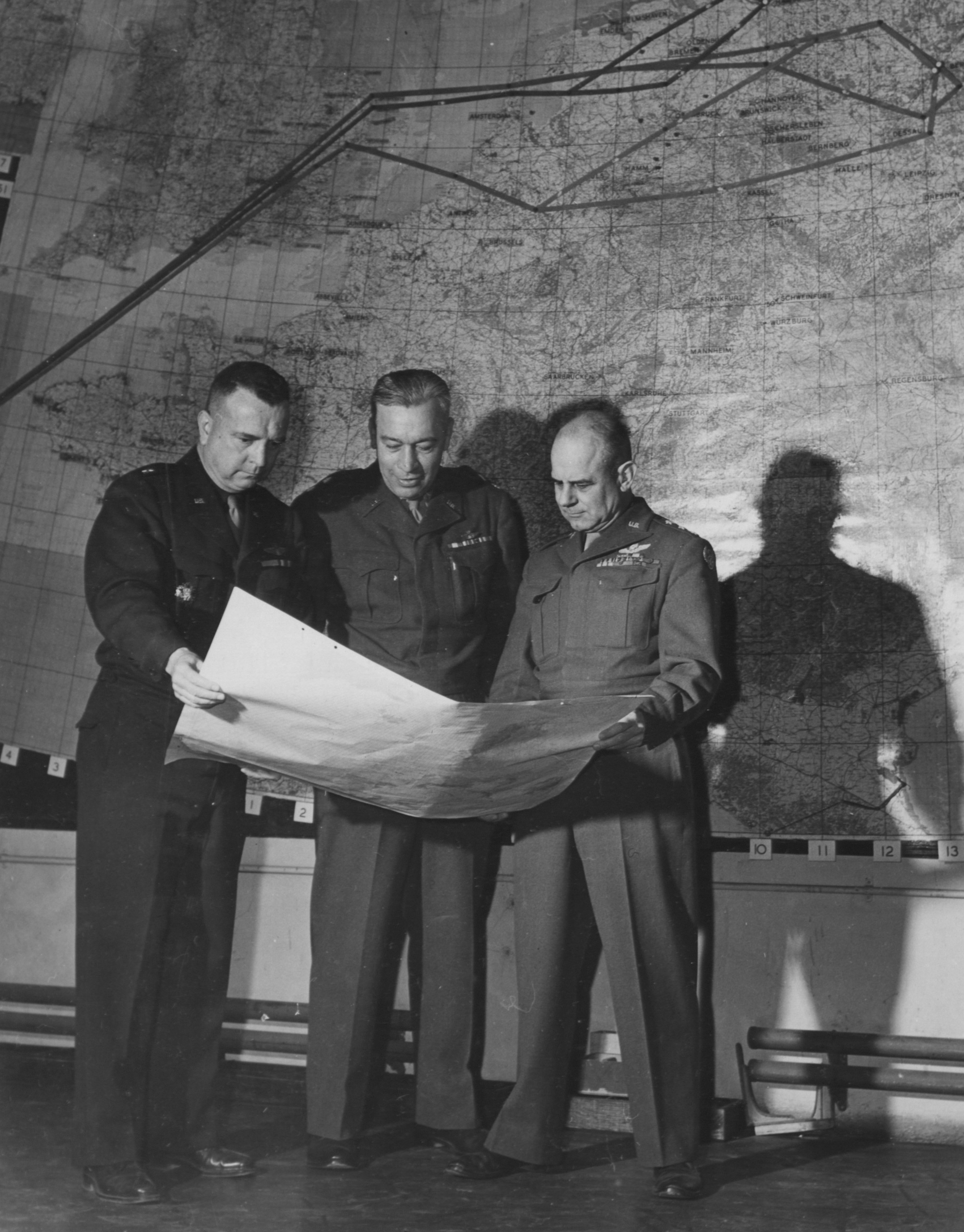
Anderson (center) with Lieutenant General James Doolittle (right) and Brigadier General Charles Banfill (left) at 8th Air Force headquarters in England

In World War II, Anderson worked in the Air War Plans Division, and was involved in planning the Combined Bomber Offensive against Nazi Germany. He proved to be a brilliant, strategic planner and combat leader, as he selected the targets, planned, and directed the missions for Operation Big Week of February 1944. These concentrated bombing strikes were the beginning of the 1,000-plane raids over Germany, which marked the turning point of the air war over Europe. He was promoted to brigadier general on September 18, 1942 and promoted to major general on February 28, 1944.

=== Search for Glenn Miller ===
At the end of 1944, Anderson was in charge of an important search effort. Anderson's wife, Maude Miller Anderson, was band leader Major Glenn Miller's cousin. Miller went missing over the English Channel on December 15, 1944. The Eighth Air Force and SHAEF did not realize that the UC-64 Norseman plane with Miller aboard was missing until three days later, on December 18, 1944. Upon realizing the airplane and Miller were missing, Anderson, Deputy Commander for Operations of the Eighth Air Force, ordered a search and investigation. Miller was not found. Miller's wife Helen accepted her husband's Bronze Star medal at a ceremony at Miller's New York business office on March 23, 1945. When Miller was officially declared dead in December 1945, his wife received a formal letter of condolence and appreciation from Gen. H. H. Arnold. When Anderson returned from Europe, he visited Miller's wife and informed her of the inquiry findings. On January 20, 1945, an Eighth Air Force Board of Inquiry in England determined that the UC-64 airplane went down over the English Channel due to a combination of human error, mechanical failure and weather. He was not the victim of foul play or friendly fire. Remains of the UC-64 and its passengers have never been found. The three officers were officially declared dead on the standard year and a day after they went missing. This was published in a 1946 Army publication showing that Miller has a Finding of Death (FOD).

== Korean War ==
In 1950 Anderson was the Commandant of the USAF's Air War College. He was one of many Americans frustrated by the limitations placed upon American conduct of the Korean War. It was no secret that the North Koreans were acting on behalf of their sponsor, the Soviet Union, but as the Truman administration did not want the war to expand into a global conflict, fighting was limited to the Korean peninsula. Air Force Chief of Staff General Hoyt Vandenberg suspended Anderson after he told a newspaper interviewer, "Give me the order to do it and I can break up Russia’s five A-bomb nests in a week. And when I went up to Christ, I think I could explain to him why I wanted to do it—now—before it’s too late. I think I could explain to him that I had saved civilization." He retired shortly thereafter.

== Death ==
Anderson died on August 22, 1965, of lung cancer at Maxwell Air Force Base, Montgomery, Alabama.

== Awards ==
- Legion of Merit
- Distinguished Flying Cross
- World War I Victory Medal
- American Defense Service Medal
- American Campaign Medal
- World War II Victory Medal
- National Defense Service Medal
