= Pennington County, South Dakota =

County in South Dakota, United States

- County
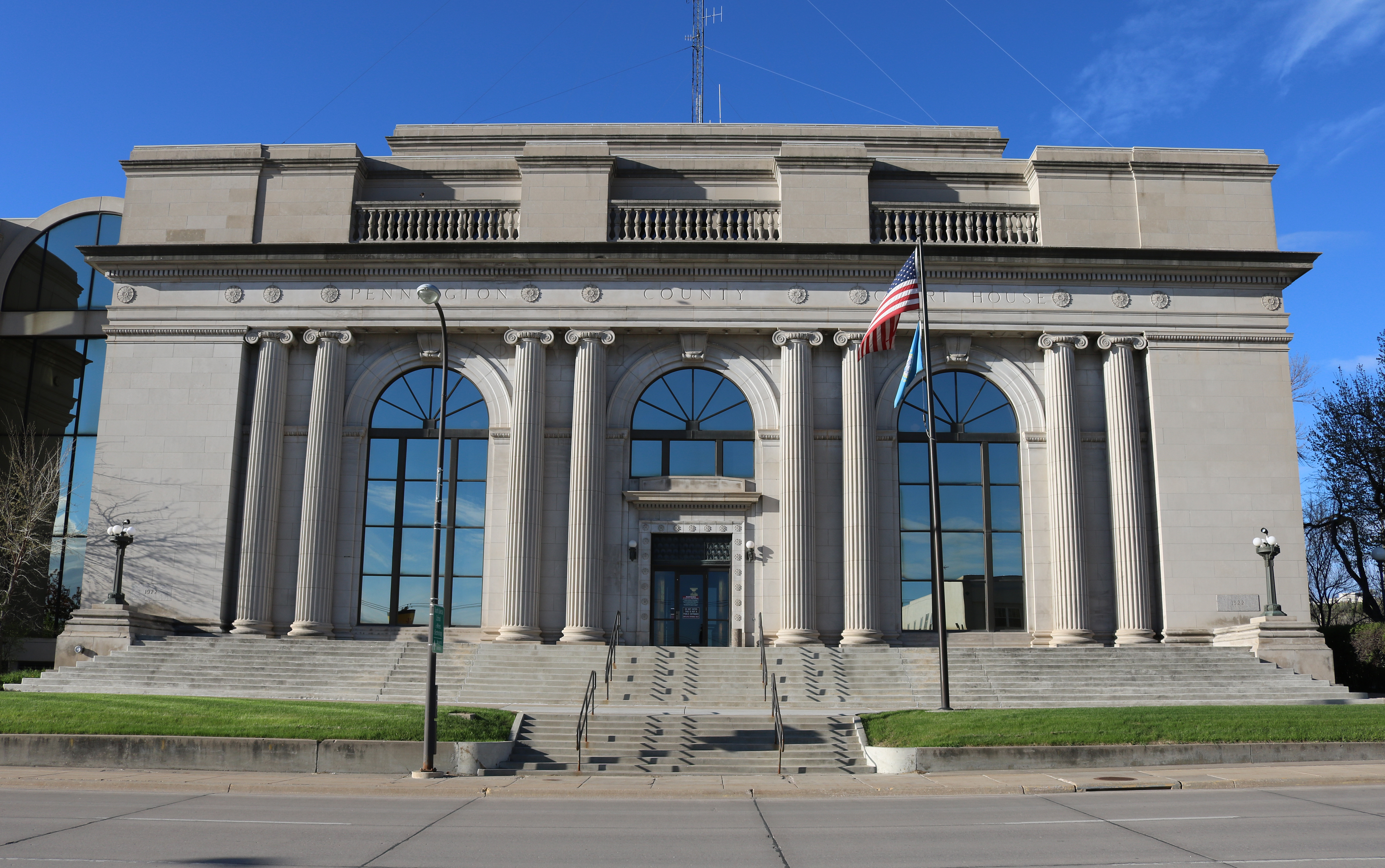
- Pennington County Courthouse in Rapid City

- Location within the U.S. state of South Dakota
- Coordinates: 44°00′8.456″N 102°49′25.683″W
- Country: United States
- State: South Dakota
- Founded: January 11, 1875 (created); April 19, 1877 (organized)
- Named for: John L. Pennington
- Seat: Rapid City
- Largest city: Rapid City

Area
  - Total: 2,784.459 sq mi (7,211.72 km^{2})
  - Land: 2,776.765 sq mi (7,191.79 km^{2})
  - Water: 7.694 sq mi (19.93 km^{2}) 0.28%

Population (2020)
  - Total: 109,222
  - Estimate (2025): 116,792 ▲
  - Density: 41.777/sq mi (16.130/km^{2})
- Time zone: UTC−7 (Mountain)
  - Summer (DST): UTC−6 (MDT)
- Congressional district: At-large
- Website: pennco.org

Pennington County is a county in the U.S. state of South Dakota. As of the 2020 census, the population was 109,222, making it the second most populous county in South Dakota, and was estimated to be 116,792 in 2025. Its county seat is Rapid City. The county was created on January 11, 1875, and was organized on April 19, 1877. It is named for John L. Pennington, fifth Governor of Dakota Territory, who held office in 1875 when the county was formed. Pennington County is included in the Rapid City metropolitan statistical area. It is also the location of Mount Rushmore.

== History ==
In 1874, US Army commander George A. Custer led a group into the Black Hills area. He and some of his officers climbed the crest now called Black Elk Peak, and made a toast to US General William S. Harney. They named the peak for Harney, and this name was used until 2016. This expedition reported that gold could be found in the Black Hills, which spurred a gold rush into the future county area. The mining settlements that sprang up were in violation of the second Treaty of Fort Laramie signed with the Sioux Nation in 1868. By 1875, settlement was sufficient to justify creation of a local governing organization, so Pennington County was created on January 11, 1875, and it was fully organized by April 19, 1877. The county's boundaries were adjusted in 1877 and in 1898.

The county seat was initially at Sheridan, a mining camp. (Sheridan is credited with hosting the first Federal Court west of the Missouri River.) In 1878, the county seat was moved to Rapid City.

In 1923, Doane Robinson, superintendent of the SD State Historical Society, began promoting the concept of a giant sculpture carved from a Black Hills mountain. By 1927 this concept took substance, when work on Mount Rushmore began.

Shortly after the US entered World War II, an Army training airbase was established in Pennington County. It has continued until the present, now known as Ellsworth Air Force Base. Supporting this activity has provided a substantial portion of the county's economic base since that time.

== Geography ==
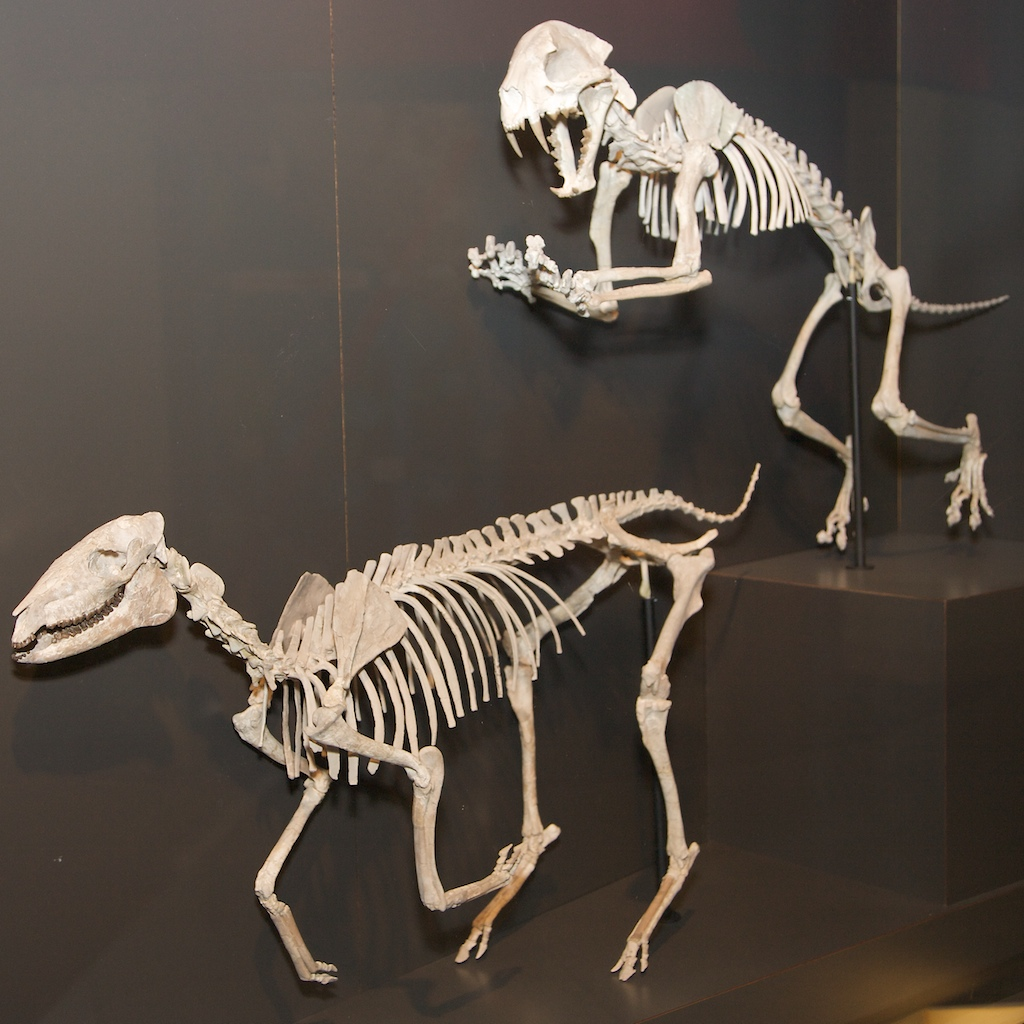
Extinct Mesohippus horse, found in Pennington County, on display at the Houston Museum of Natural Science

Pennington County is located on the west line of South Dakota. Its west boundary line abuts the east boundary line of the state of Wyoming. Its west end contains the nation's highest peak east of the continental divide, Black Elk Peak. The rugged arid western end contains forest and gullies, descendending to rough rolling hill country in the east. The Cheyenne River flows north-northeastward through the center of the county and then along its northeastern border on its way to discharge in the Missouri River, while Rapid Creek flows east-southeastward through the western part, to discharge into the Cheyenne at the county's midpoint. The county terrain varies in elevation from Black Elk Peak at 7,242 ft (2,207 m) to its NE corner, at 1,896 ft (578 m) ASL.

According to the United States Census Bureau, the county has a total area of 2,784.459 square miles (7,211.72 km^{2}), of which 2,776.765 square miles (7,191.79 km^{2}) is land and 7.694 square miles (19.93 km^{2}) (0.28%) is water. It is the third-largest county in South Dakota by total area, and is larger than the state of Delaware.

=== Major highways ===
- Interstate 90
- U.S. Highway 14
- U.S. Highway 16
- U.S. Highway 16A
- U.S. Highway 385
- South Dakota Highway 40
- South Dakota Highway 44
- South Dakota Highway 240
- South Dakota Highway 244

=== Transit ===
- Jefferson Lines
- Rapid City Rapid Ride

=== Adjacent counties ===
- Meade County – north
- Ziebach County – northeast
- Haakon County – northeast
- Jackson County – southeast
- Oglala Lakota County – south
- Custer County – southwest
- Weston County, Wyoming – west
- Lawrence County – northwest

=== National protected areas ===
- Badlands National Park (part)
  - Badlands Wilderness
- Black Hills National Forest (part)
  - Black Elk Wilderness (part)
- Buffalo Gap National Grassland (part)
- Minuteman Missile National Historic Site (part)
- Mount Rushmore National Memorial

=== Lakes and reservoirs ===
- Deerfield Lake
- Pactola Reservoir
- Shearer Lake
- Sheridan Lake

== Demographics ==
Historical population
Census	Pop.	Note	%±
1880	2,244		—
1890	6,540		191.4%
1900	5,610		−14.2%
1910	12,453		122.0%
1920	12,720		2.1%
1930	20,079		57.9%
1940	23,799		18.5%
1950	34,053		43.1%
1960	58,195		70.9%
1970	59,349		2.0%
1980	70,361		18.6%
1990	81,343		15.6%
2000	88,565		8.9%
2010	100,948		14.0%
2020	109,222		8.2%
2025 (est.)	116,792	▲	6.9%
U.S. Decennial Census; 1790–1960 1900–1990; 1990–2000 2010–2020

As of the third quarter of 2024, the median home value in Pennington County was $326,400.

As of the 2023 American Community Survey, there are 45,698 estimated households in Pennington County with an average of 2.37 persons per household. The county has a median household income of $70,768. Approximately 11.6% of the county's population lives at or below the poverty line. Pennington County has an estimated 63.0% employment rate, with 34.1% of the population holding a bachelor's degree or higher and 94.7% holding a high school diploma.

The median age in the county was 40.2 years.

Pennington County, South Dakota – racial and ethnic composition
Note: the US Census treats Hispanic/Latino as an ethnic category. This table excludes Latinos from the racial categories and assigns them to a separate category. Hispanics/Latinos may be of any race.

Race / ethnicity (NH = non-Hispanic)	Pop. 1980	Pop. 1990	Pop. 2000	Pop. 2010	Pop. 2020
White alone (NH)	64,148 (91.17%)	71,882 (88.37%)	75,797 (85.58%)	82,438 (81.66%)	82,743 (75.76%)
Black or African American alone (NH)	875 (1.24%)	1,249 (1.54%)	722 (0.82%)	1,013 (1.00%)	1,363 (1.25%)
Native American or Alaska Native alone (NH)	3,643 (5.18%)	5,518 (6.78%)	6,773 (7.65%)	9,042 (8.96%)	10,927 (10.00%)
Asian alone (NH)	360 (0.51%)	884 (1.09%)	763 (0.86%)	1,041 (1.03%)	1,463 (1.34%)
Pacific Islander alone (NH)	—	—	51 (0.06%)	76 (0.08%)	78 (0.07%)
Other race alone (NH)	91 (0.13%)	33 (0.04%)	66 (0.07%)	71 (0.07%)	411 (0.38%)
Mixed race or multiracial (NH)	—	—	2,052 (2.32%)	3,223 (3.19%)	6,662 (6.10%)
Hispanic or Latino (any race)	1,244 (1.77%)	1,777 (2.18%)	2,341 (2.64%)	4,044 (4.01%)	5,575 (5.10%)
Total	70,361 (100.00%)	81,343 (100.00%)	88,565 (100.00%)	100,948 (100.00%)	109,222 (100.00%)

=== 2020 census ===
As of the 2020 census, there were 109,222 people, 44,909 households, and 27,584 families residing in the county. Of the residents, 22.4% were under the age of 18 and 18.6% were 65 years of age or older; the median age was 38.9 years. For every 100 females there were 100.8 males, and for every 100 females age 18 and over there were 99.5 males.

The population density was 39.3 inhabitants per square mile (15.2/km^{2}), and there were 49,153 housing units at an average density of 17.7 per square mile (6.8/km^{2}). The racial makeup of the county was 77.4% White, 1.3% African American, 10.7% Native American, 1.4% Asian, 0.08% Pacific Islander, 1.3% from some other races, and 7.9% from two or more races. Hispanic or Latino people of any race were 5.1% of the population.

There were 44,909 households in the county, of which 27.7% had children under the age of 18 living with them and 26.0% had a female householder with no spouse or partner present. About 31.2% of all households were made up of individuals and 12.1% had someone living alone who was 65 years of age or older.

There were 49,153 housing units, of which 8.6% were vacant. Among occupied housing units, 64.0% were owner-occupied and 36.0% were renter-occupied. The homeowner vacancy rate was 1.4% and the rental vacancy rate was 8.0%.

=== 2010 census ===
As of the 2010 census, there were 100,948 people, 41,251 households, and 26,323 families residing in the county. The population density was 36.4 inhabitants per square mile (14.1/km^{2}). There were 44,949 housing units at an average density of 16.2 per square mile (6.3/km^{2}). The racial makeup of the county was 83.56% White, 1.04% African American, 9.66% Native American, 1.04% Asian, 0.08% Pacific Islander, 0.81% from some other races and 3.82% from two or more races. Hispanic or Latino people of any race were 4.01% of the population. In terms of ancestry, 38.0% were German, 14.3% were Irish, 11.0% were Norwegian, 10.2% were English, and 3.6% were American.

Of the 41,251 households, 31.5% had children under the age of 18 living with them, 47.1% were married couples living together, 11.7% had a female householder with no husband present, 36.2% were non-families, and 29.0% of all households were made up of individuals. The average household size was 2.38 and the average family size was 2.93. The median age was 36.8 years.

The median income for a household in the county was $46,849 and the median income for a family was $57,278. Males had a median income of $38,626 versus $30,251 for females. The per capita income for the county was $25,894. About 9.4% of families and 14.0% of the population were below the poverty line, including 20.7% of those under age 18 and 7.6% of those age 65 or over.

== Law enforcement & emergency services ==
The Pennington County Sheriff's Office provides county-wide law enforcement services to the county. There are 118 deputies in the Patrol Division, in addition court services, investigations, and operation of the Pennington County Jail. The sheriff's office is headquartered in Rapid City. The sheriff's office issues concealed pistol permits to county residents. The current Sheriff is Brian Mueller.

The Sheriff's Office also operates the Pennington County Search and Rescue (PCSAR) team, a volunteer search and rescue (SAR) team based in Rapid City, was established in 1973, prompted by a 1972 flood in Rapid City. It serves residents and tourists in the county and the Black Hills area.

== Communities ==
=== Cities ===
- Box Elder
- Hill City
- New Underwood
- Rapid City (county seat)

=== Towns ===
- Keystone
- Quinn
- Wall
- Wasta

=== Census-designated places ===
- Ashland Heights
- Caputa
- Colonial Pine Hills
- Green Valley
- Johnson Siding
- Rapid Valley

=== Unincorporated communities ===
- Ajax
- Colonial Pine Hills
- Creighton
- Ellsworth AFB
- Farmingdale
- Hisega
- Imlay
- Owanka
- Merritt (partial)
- Mystic
- Pedro
- Rochford
- Rockerville
- Scenic
- Silver City
- Three Forks
- Wicksville

=== Ghost towns ===
- Addie Camp
- Conata
- Creighton
- Etta
- Moon
- Myers City
- Pactola
- Pedro
- Redfern
- Sheridan
- Teddy Bear
- Tigerville

=== Townships ===
- Ash
- Castle Butte
- Cedar Butte
- Conata
- Crooked Creek
- Fairview
- Flat Butte
- Huron
- Imlay
- Lake Creek
- Lake Flat
- Lake Hill
- Owanka
- Peno
- Quinn
- Rainy Creek/Cheyenne
- Scenic
- Shyne
- Sunnyside
- Wasta

=== Unorganized territories ===
- Central Pennington
- Dalzell Canyon
- East Central Pennington
- Mount Rushmore
- Northeast Pennington
- Rapid City East
- West Pennington

== Politics ==
Pennington County is very conservative for an urban county. It has been strongly Republican for decades, having voted Republican in all but one presidential election since 1936 (Johnson's landslide victory in 1964). Republicans usually win the county with over 60% of the vote, the most recent exception being in 2008, where John McCain got 59.6% of the vote. No Democrat has garnered more than 40% of the county's vote since Jimmy Carter in 1976.

United States presidential election results for Pennington County, South Dakota
Year	Republican		Democratic		Third party(ies)	
Year	No.	%	No.	%	No.	%
1892	959	50.66%	147	7.77%	787	41.57%
1896	739	41.40%	1,038	58.15%	8	0.45%
1900	898	52.92%	784	46.20%	15	0.88%
1904	1,126	69.00%	392	24.02%	114	6.99%
1908	1,702	57.38%	1,160	39.11%	104	3.51%
1912	0	0.00%	1,135	48.15%	1,222	51.85%
1916	1,108	42.73%	1,339	51.64%	146	5.63%
1920	2,568	64.23%	1,205	30.14%	225	5.63%
1924	3,201	63.57%	854	16.96%	980	19.46%
1928	4,645	66.97%	2,266	32.67%	25	0.36%
1932	3,638	40.99%	5,178	58.34%	59	0.66%
1936	4,442	42.60%	5,557	53.29%	429	4.11%
1940	6,603	57.51%	4,878	42.49%	0	0.00%
1944	5,246	59.87%	3,517	40.13%	0	0.00%
1948	6,392	56.01%	4,929	43.19%	92	0.81%
1952	11,029	71.16%	4,470	28.84%	0	0.00%
1956	10,955	67.26%	5,332	32.74%	0	0.00%
1960	11,364	60.31%	7,478	39.69%	0	0.00%
1964	8,926	47.46%	9,881	52.54%	0	0.00%
1968	9,671	53.29%	7,303	40.24%	1,174	6.47%
1972	13,654	61.16%	8,592	38.48%	80	0.36%
1976	13,352	56.34%	10,058	42.44%	289	1.22%
1980	18,991	67.33%	7,121	25.25%	2,092	7.42%
1984	21,947	72.22%	8,224	27.06%	218	0.72%
1988	19,510	61.44%	12,068	38.00%	179	0.56%
1992	18,052	47.92%	11,106	29.48%	8,511	22.59%
1996	19,293	54.32%	12,784	36.00%	3,439	9.68%
2000	24,696	67.55%	11,123	30.43%	738	2.02%
2004	29,976	66.66%	14,213	31.61%	779	1.73%
2008	27,603	59.64%	17,802	38.47%	875	1.89%
2012	28,232	63.49%	15,125	34.02%	1,107	2.49%
2016	29,804	62.43%	14,074	29.48%	3,865	8.10%
2020	35,063	60.96%	20,606	35.83%	1,849	3.21%
2024	35,009	61.88%	20,051	35.44%	1,520	2.69%

== Education ==
School districts include:

- Custer School District 16-1
- Douglas School District 51-1
- Hill City School District 51-2
- New Underwood School District 51-3
- Rapid City School District 51-4
- Wall School District 51-5

== See also ==
- National Register of Historic Places listings in Pennington County, South Dakota
