= List of ghost towns in South Dakota =

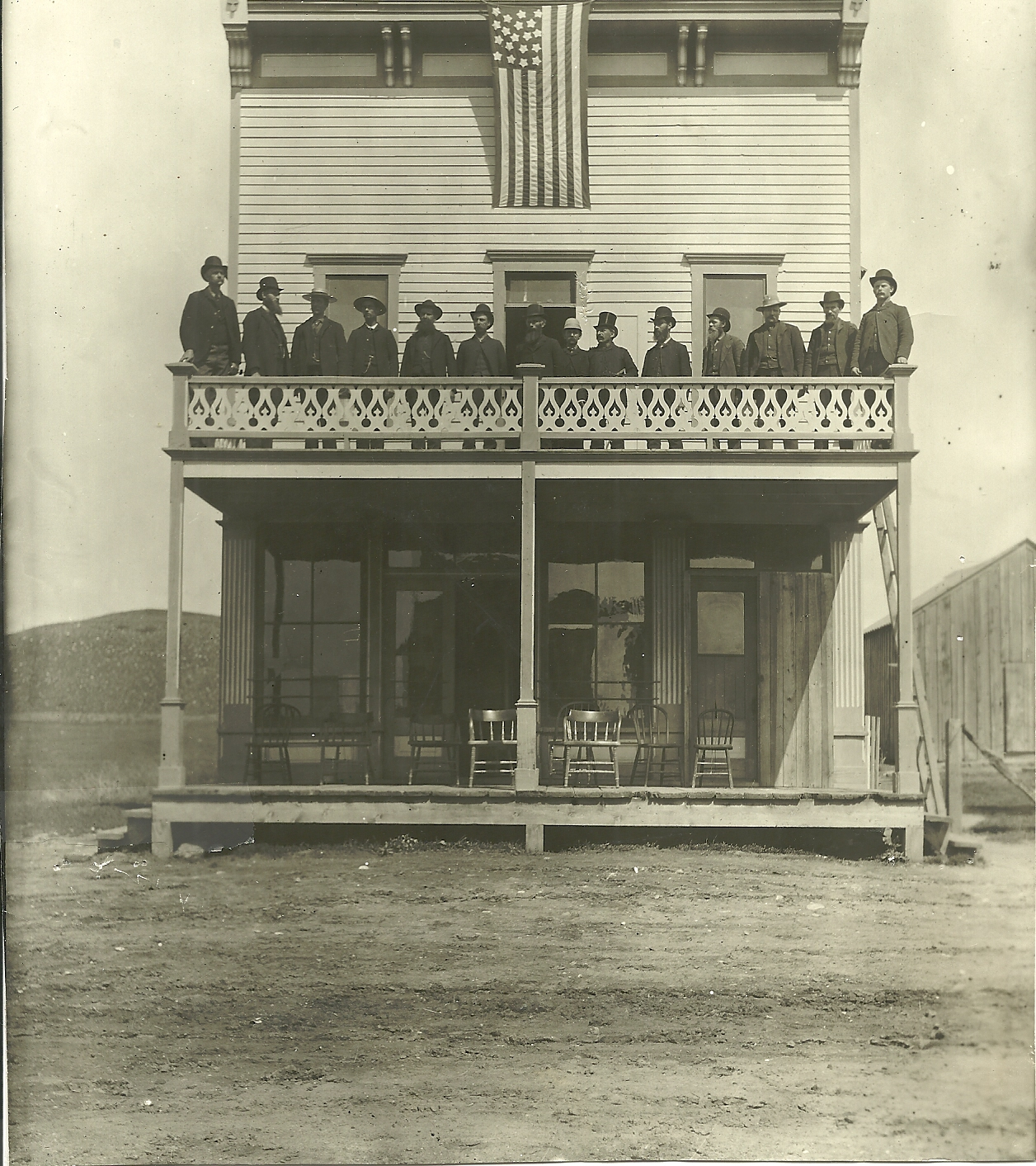
The founders of the town of Minnesela standing on the balcony of the Minnesela Hotel in 1889.

This is an incomplete list of ghost towns in South Dakota, United States of America.

== Classification ==
Rockerville in 2006.

Ghost towns can include sites in various states of disrepair and abandonment. Some sites no longer have any trace of civilization and have reverted to pasture land or empty fields. Other sites are unpopulated but still have standing buildings.

=== Barren site ===
- Sites no longer in existence or have been destroyed
- Deserted or barren
- Covered with water
- Reverted to pasture
- May have a few difficult-to-find foundations/footings at most

=== Neglected site ===
- Only rubble left
- Buildings or houses still standing, but majority are roofless

=== Abandoned site ===
- Building or houses still standing but all abandoned
- No population, except possibly a caretaker
- Site no longer in existence except for one or two buildings

== Ghost towns ==
=== A through B ===
Name	Other names	County	Location	Dates	Status	Notes	Media
Addie Camp	Kennedyville, Canadaville, Addie Spur	Pennington		1892-1917	Neglected	Addie Camp, South Dakota, was a small mining town that began around 1892 when miners moved into the area to work at the nearby Addie Mine. The town grew when a railroad line was built to transport ore, bringing in workers and leading to the creation of buildings like a boarding house, saloon, and small station. For a short time, the town had a steady economy based on tin mining and railroad activity. The mines never became very successful, and when railroad tracks were removed in 1917, the town quickly lost its main source of support. Quickly declining into the few buildings that still stand today.	
Albany		Lawrence	Lat: 44.1999846 Long: -103.690751	January 27, 1838	Barren	Albany only had one house even on earlier maps.	
Allen's Camp		Pennington		1875 or 1876-?		A Mr. Allen began mining on Spring Creek some time in 1875 or 1876. He mined approximately $2,000 in gold and dust. He was elected as the recorder for Slate Creek Mining District. He was elected to the Wyoming legislature when he returned to Cheyenne. Found in Andreas' Historical Atlas.	
Allerton		Lawrence	Latitude: 44.2874849 Longitude:-103.6785285		Barren	From historic road side marker - #270 Black Hills Tragedy “This was Brownsville; half a mile E, down Elk Creek in 1883, was the Hood & Scott lumber Mill near rails end at Allerton. The boarding house at Mill burnt down on 10–11 March and dying in the fire were: Albert Tunnicliff, Raisha C. Rice, James Chalmers, Samuel Haines, Fred D. Peters, Thomas Finless, Charles Hammontree, Peter and Louis Hanson, Harvey Wood and W.H. Andrews. They were buried in Mt. Moriah Cemetery in a common grave. One of the worst Hills tragedies.” Erected: 1959	
Alta	Altamine	Pennington	LAT: N44 06 14 LONG W103 44 19	1870s-?	Neglected	This small settlement was very close, nearly the same to, Myersville. As early as 1878, it had a population of 20. In 1883, The Alta Lodi Mining company built a 40 stamp mill, which was later moved to Lookout. In 1893, James Cochran built a 16 ton Huntington Mill, which he operated until 1917. Exploratory work continued sporadically until 1936, but it is possible that only in its early days could Alta be considered anything more than a single mine and its community.	
American City		Lawrence			Barren	The exact location is unknown, due to flooding that has destroyed all traces of the town.American City was reportedly at the mouth of a long valley leading into Spearfish Canyon, but repeated floods in the area removed all traces of it.	
Anchor		Lawrence	1878			This town was in the Ragged Top mining district. Not to be confused with Anchor City. Town possibly took its name from the Balmoral and Anchor group of mining claims.	
Anchor City		Lawrence				This was an early mining camp close to Deadwood on Deadwood Creek above Golden Gate and Central City. Also called "Anchor"; not to be confused with Anchor. The population was recorded, in 1881, to be 291.	
Annie Creek	Stanley City, Reliance	Lawrence	Location NE 1/4, Section 3, T4N-R2E.			Was located on Annie Creek. It was the Annie Creek Mining Company which was, formerly, known as "The New Reliance" and, even earlier, as "The Reliance" Group. The Reliance produce over $600,000 worth of gold up to 1916 and further sampling was done in 1935, but up to 1974 no recent production was reported. The mailing address of the Reliance Mill was Portland. The 1915 USGS map seems to show a narrow gauge railroad leading almost to the mine. The Reliance Mine is 1 1/2 miles (2.4 km) west of Trojan or 2 miles (3.2 km) Northeast of Elmore. Any evidence of the town is buried on the tailings of an open pit mine.	
Ardmore		Fall River		1889-2004	Abandoned	Ardmore, South Dakota was founded in 1889 as a small town along a railroad line, and it quickly became a stop where trains could refill water and supplies, spurring the growth of the town. However, Ardmore faced serious problems from the start. The local water was not safe to drink because it was too acidic, and the area often had droughts, which made farming very difficult. When trains no longer needed to stop for water due to new technology, Ardmore lost its main purpose. As jobs disappeared, people slowly moved away, and the town was eventually abandoned.	The Volunteer Fire Department in Ardmore in 2010
Argonne		Miner		1886-1970s	Barren	Argonne, South Dakota started in 1886 as a small railroad town called St. Marys, it was founded by a doctor named Louis Gotthelf. It depended on the railroad and nearby farming to survive, around 1919 it became a small trade center, and in 1920 it was renamed Argonne to honor soldiers who died in World War I.	
Argyle		Custer			Barren	"Argyle" is named for an early settler to the area. No physical evidence remains, except the site rests next to the Mickelson Trail (old Burlington tracks)	
Arpan		Butte				Arpan, South Dakota was founded in 1910, growing around both mining activity and a nearby railroad line. The town quickly became a local hub where trains stopped, and businesses like general stores and grain elevators helped support both miners and farmers in the area. A post office opened in 1911. After World War II, changes in farming and transportation caused people to move away, and important services like the post office and stores eventually closed. Today only few buildings remain.	
Astoria		Lawrence		1887-?	Neglected		
Athboy		Corson			Abandoned	This post office and small village was established west of Whitney (6 miles, 9.7 km), as Whitney was fading out of the picture somewhat. Athboy was a fourth class post office near Black Horse Creek (Whitney Creek). The population was 12 in 1940 and included a blacksmith shop on the corner of "Tuff Avenue and Thunder Hawk Street", as well as a grocery store and post office. Ralph Moore was the first postmaster in December 1917 and continued in the capacity until March 1944, when the mail went to Meadow. The Ruther's maintained the general store, post office and blacksmith shop. The Ruthers also had a gas pump, after cars were used in the area.	
Atlantic City		Custer	Town is in the SE 1/4 of section 5 T3S – R4E north of Custer and about two miles (3.2 km) of Bernie Siding, but location of the mine is unknown as no ruins have been found.		Barren	The exact location of the town and its mine are a mystery. Atlantic City, according to Black Hills Ghost Towns, the town was home to the Atlantic Mine and its 40 stamp mill. There is a mine called "The Atlantic" which has been found through mine data, which is apparently still a mine that is claimed. It is not clear if it is the same mine, but it is in Custer. Link to information about the Atlantic Mine - http://nevada-outback-gems.com/Gold_rush_history/South_Dakota/S_Dakota13.htm	
Bakerville		Custer	Latitude: 43.668597 Longitude: -103.4293607		Barren	Located in Custer State Park. The 1901 USGS map of the area shows just two houses here. On the south fork of Lame Johnny Creek. In 1887, it had a post office and, in 1900, a population of 27 people.	
Ball		Butte			Barren	Found on a map USGennet used as a header (also discovered on 1921 Rand McNally and Company map) on; it seemed to have been located on the North Fork Sulpher Creek (earlier, known also as "Rattle Snake Creek"), very close to the Butte County - Delano (Meade) County borders. Map link - Northwest of Sulpher which was in Meade County. LOCATION (USGS MAP) - Found on 1910 NEWELL USGS map T.11.N - R.9.E Found in WPA Project book under Ghost Towns South Dakota Place Names : 25 miles (40.2 km) Northeast of Newell, derived its name from the wife of the first postmaster, Mrs. Smith E. Russel, whose maiden name was Ball. The post office was discontinued many years before the publication. 1916 Business Directory (http://files.usgwarchives.net/sd/butte/business/ball1916.txt) shows a general store.	
Balmoral		Lawrence		c. 1897-1910s	Neglected	Possibly an earlier name for Cyanide, which was in the same mining district. Also known as "Ragged Top". Now, known as Preston	
Bangor		Walworth			Barren	https://kxrb.com/bangor-maine-is-famous-bangor-south-dakota-not-so-much-lets-take-a-road-trip/	
Bear Butte	Bare Butte	Lawrence				Not to be confused with Bear Butte, the butte located to the southeast of the town site. Bear Butte was a mining town on Bear Butte Creek, approximately where Galena is now, or further east down the creek.	
Bear Gulch		Lawrence		c. 1870s-?		Not to be confused with the Bear Gulch (Elkhorn) settlement in Pennington County.	
Bear Gulch	Elkhorn	Pennington			Barren (submerged)	Submerged under Pactola Lake. This was a stop along the Black Hills & Western Railroad. Not to be confused with the Lawrence County settlement by the same name.	
Bear Rock		Custer				An early placer mining camp. It housed the first post office in the Black Hills, which was only a cave where mail was delivered.	
Beaver City		Lawrence		01/1878-?	Barren	Apparently, this was a placer camp laid out in January 1878, in the Germania district, 1/2 mile (0.8 km) above Quartz City, which in turn was on the supposed junction of Hay and Elk Creeks.	
Bernardsville		Lawrence		c. 1877-?	Barren	Exact location unknown, but is somewhere one-half mile east of the Wyoming state line.	
Besant	Besant Flats, Besant Park	Lawrence			Neglected	Besant, South Dakota was a small settlement that likely developed during the late 1800s. Like many towns in Lawrence County, it was probably tied to nearby mining activity and depended on those jobs and transportation routes to survive. The town of Besant was short-lived because it relied on limited natural resources and unstable industries. When mining slowed down or transportation routes changed, people moved away. Besant was left with very little recorded history.	
Big Bottom		Meade		1878-1887	Neglected	Big Bottom, South Dakota was founded in 1878 by Thomas D. Pryor as a small farming and social settlement. The town grew to include a popular saloon and dance hall where many locals socialized. In 1880, residents established a post office and school. People in Big Bottom hoped a railroad would come through and boost business, but the line was built elsewhere, keeping the town small and mostly rural during its active years.	
Bismuth		Custer			Neglected	Bismuth, South Dakota was a community established in the late 1800s, By about 1901, there were about half a dozen houses there, and the town had a small store where people could buy goods and as well featured a baseball team.	
Black Fox		Pennington			Barren	A campground is located there now.	
Blacktail		Lawrence					
Bloomington		Brown	Five miles (8.1 km) north of Vermillion on a small creek.	?-1877	Barren	Was destroyed by outlaws.	
Bluevale		Pennington		?-c. 1900	Barren	Cram's Unrivaled Atlas of the World shows Bluevale northwest of Rapid City. Population, in 1890, was shown as only 18.	
Bon Homme		Clay			Abandoned	Homme was a booming town during territorial day. It was destined to be the territorial capital and was later promised the territorial prison. The first school in the territory was located there. Declined after being bypassed by the railroad.	
Boughton		Lawrence			Barren	An old map shows Boughton as S-W of Deadwood, on the east side of the Fort Pierre Railroad and Southwest of Pennington. Boughton possibly is the same as Broughton, but since there were notable men of both names, it could be possible there was two towns in close proximity of each other. First postmaster was Eusebe C. Violin in 1880, but the post office was discontinued in October 1882. In 1891, it had a population of 151. Broughton was located about 6 miles (9.7 km) south of Lead on the railroad, from Central City to Brownsville.	
Boulder	Boulder Park	Lawrence	About 4.5 miles (7.2 km) southwest of Sturgis.	?-1880s	Barren	Although shown on some early maps, Boulder shows no population in the 1890 Census.	
Brashville		Lawrence		February 2, 1881-June 1882		The dates listed are the dates that the post office was in operation. John Brasch was installed as postmaster on Feb. 2nd 1881, but the post office was discontinued in June 1882.	
Brennan	Warbonnet, Siding Eleven	Pennington				Brennan, South Dakota was a small settlement that appeared on early maps as Brennan or Warbonnet and was likely tied to ranching, farming, and early transportation routes on the plains. While specific historical records about its daily life are unknown, Brennan likely served as local hub where ranchers and farmers could meet, trade goods, and access services such as mail.	
Buena Vista		Fall River			Neglected	Buena Vista, north of Edgemont. provided grindstones. Some are still there, too big for even vandals to damage or remove. Buena Vista was in the SWÁ, Sec. 17, T8S, R3E	
Buena Viste		Lawrence			Barren	Buena Viste, South Dakota appeared on maps in the 1880’s. It served as a support point for local mines and settlers coming in. Records of Buena Viste are limited, as it didn’t feature any large industry or post office. It is thought to have been abandoned in the early 1890’s.	
Bugtown		Custer	Latitude: 43.7963704 Longitude: -103.7046407	?-1880s	Barren	Located approximately three miles (4.8 km) north of Custer, on route 385. Bugtown was, at one time, a wealthy gold mining town.	
Burdock	Argentine	Fall River			Neglected	Burdock, South Dakota first appeared on maps as a place people lived and worked near what is now Dewey Road and the BNSF railroad line. The town’s name comes from early place name records, though no one today knows exactly why it was called Burdock. The area became noteworthy when uranium was discovered nearby in 1952, and small mining operations began, producing ore from shallow open pits and tunnels. Workers involved with mining and transportation would have used the rail line that passed through town to move materials and supplies.	

=== C through D ===
Name	Other names	County	Location	Dates	Status	Notes	Media
Calcite	Quarry	Meade			Barren	Calcite was named because calcite, a crystallized carbonate in the limestone located there, was treated there to produce lime for the Homestake Mining Company. The lime kilns were operated there for 10 to 12 years, during which time the entire population consisted of the workers and their family. When the production of lime was discontinued, the railroad located there was torn up and most of the buildings were moved. In 1934, a veterans CCC camp was established on the site, but it to was moved. Looking at satellite views of the area, nothing remains.	
Canyon City		Pennington	Location : SW 1/4, Section 35, T2N-R4E		Barren	Four miles (6.4 km) southeast of Mystic, the town was named because of its location in a canyon. The town was a booming mining camp with a population of 400 people, during its heyday. When the mines began to fail, the town was doomed to be one of the Black Hills ghost towns. Looking at Satellite imagery of the area, and according to online reports found, there is no remaining evidence of the town or the railroad that was there.	
Carbonate	West Virginia, Virginia, Carbonate Camp, Carbonate City, Crow Creek Carbonate Camp	Lawrence		c. 1881-1939	Neglected	The town was mostly abandoned in 1891, but the town's last resident died in 1939.	photo taken circa 1890
Cartersville	Lincoln	Lawrence	Location Section 4, T4N -R3E.		Barren	Not to be confused with Carterville. Cartersville in 1879 had approximately twenty cabins and a restaurant, and was near the Caledonia, Carter and Lincoln Mines on Elk Creek. The Caledonia was later absorbed into the Homestake Operations, which would indicate that Cartersville, also known as "Lincoln", was somewhere near the Homestake. Today, the townsite is the entrance of the Kirk George S. Mickelson Trail Trailhead.	
Carterville	Carter	Pennington	Location Section 3, T2N-R3E	1879-?		Not to be confused with Cartersville. The general area of Carterville was also known variously as: Elkhorn (I), Gregory and Montana City. The name "Carterville", apparently, came from a Carter Mine (not listed in the "Black Hills Mineral" Atlas) in that region.	
Carwye		Meade	Location: 44.222208, -103.421298		Barren	Carwye owed its name to its position at the end of one of the Homestake Mining Company's narrow gauge railroad lines. To save backing the trains many miles, a Y was installed at the end of the line and the station was called "Car Y", which soon became Carwye. The busy little railroad and lumbering town consisted of several stores, saloons, boarding houses and homes of the railroad workers and lumber men, who worked for the Homestake Mining Company. The railroad lines were torn up and the town of Carwye, literally, disappeared over night.	
Cascade	Cascade Springs	Fall River		1888-?	Abandoned	Is in Alabough Canyon, about 8 miles (12.9 km) south of Hot Springs, on SD 87. It was founded in 1888 as a resort town. A warm mineral spring, gushing out 2,000 gallons (7.6 m^{3}) of warm water a minute, was to be the invitation to attract visitors to the resort town. A four-story, hundred-room hotel was built. 36 city blocks were laid out and partially developed. It was thought the Burlington & Missouri River Railroad would go through Cascade, on its way to Hot Springs. It probably would have had developers not held up the railroad for high right-of-way prices, which forced the railroad to seek another route, which it did. Cascade then, gradually, began to decline and, by 1900, only a post office and 25 people remained.	
Castle Rock		Butte		1910-?			
Castleton		Pennington		1876–1880, 1890s	Neglected	The town was abandoned twice: first in 1880, when the mines failed; and again in the 1890s.	
Castleville		Custer		1877-1879	Barren	J. Austin Lewis was appointed postmaster of Castleville on March 27, 1877, and the post office was discontinued on September 24, 1879. "Searching Ancestry.com" found the United States Government listing J. Austin Lewis as postmaster with the above dates, Castleville, Custer County, Dakota Territories.	
Centennial City		Lawrence			Barren	Existed around 1876. Centennial City was about 2 1/2 miles (4 km) up the creek from Cook City, and in 1876 had a grocery store, restaurant and three or four miners' cabins.	
Centennial Park		Lawrence			Barren	Had a population of 52, in 1900. It was served by a post office. It appears to have centered around a benchmark, in Centennial Prairie. Only the early maps show it as a town.	
Channing		Lawrence	About 3 miles (4.8 km) northwest of Nemo		Barren	It was a very small town, that was only shown on one map.	
Cheyenne Falls		Fall River			Barren	A very small community that never had a large population. It had a post office in 1900.	
Coal Springs		Perkins					
Cold Springs		Custer			Abandoned	This mining town once had a school and cemetery.	
Conata		Pennington					
Copper Camp		Pennington		c. 1900-?		This was the name locally applied to the community which sprang up at the turn of the century around the workings of the Black Hills Copper Company. The claims held by the company, including The Climax, Bee, Solnar, and Copper Reef 1 and 2. There were many shallow workings and an 800-foot (243.8-meter) inclined shaft. Some 800 tons were shipped prior to 1917; in that year, 38 tons more, yielding 6.12% copper and 2.34 ounces (66.3 g) of gold to the ton were gleaned from the dumps and surface workings.	
Creston		Pennington			Neglected		
Cyanide		Lawrence			Neglected	Was in the same mining district as Balmoral, Preston and Dacy. Cyanide was in the Ragged Top District. There was a school and a post office. Nearby were the Ragged Top Holdings of the Spearfish Gold Mining and Reduction Company, as well as its 300-ton cyanide mill, built in 1902 and from which it is possible the town took its name.	
Dacy		Lawrence		1897? -. 1915	Barren	Was in the same mining district as Balmoral, Cyanide and Preston. The settlement, later known as Dacy, appears on the 1900 USGS maps as two solid blocks of buildings on either side of a road in the Cyanide area, with 8 other buildings scattered around its outskirts. The Dacy Mine, which was otherwise known as the Flora E. Group, was nearby and probably gave the name to the town. The only production recorded was $20,000 of gold in 1897 and, by 1915, the town was reduced to three scattered houses.	
Dansby	Danby	Custer		?-1886	Barren	Had a maximum population of 50-75 people, but as early as 1886, it was pretty well played out and closed down. Dansby was the location of a custom mill for processing placer gravels hauled in, some of them in wheel barrows from the shallow diggings.	
Deerfield	Mountain, Mountain City	Pennington			Barren (submerged)	The town site is underwater.	
Deermont		Butte					
Devoe		Faulk					
Diamond City		Lawrence			Barren	Existed around 1880. The surviving ruins of the town were torn down in 1967. In 1880, Diamond City had: the Enos' or Diamond City, stamp mill, a store, a saloon, a post office, presided over by Charles W. Yana (post office was in operation from Mar 18th, 1880 to Mar 29th 1881, according to U.S. government documents), and about a dozen homes containing a population containing 30 people. It was about 2 miles (3.2 km) north of Rochford, on Silver Creek.	
Dumont		Lawrence		1890-?	Barren	"Dumont" was named for Charles Dumont, an early French settler. It was founded in 1890 as a lumbering camp and shipping point for cattle. The railroad maintained a section house, and the spur to Hanna branched off from Dumont, toward the northwest. The lumbering faded away, the dry years spoiled the cattling and the tracks to Hanna were torn up. Nothing remains of the original town site. The Michelson Trail passes through the area.	
Dyce		Moody			Barren	Historic post office	

=== E through H ===
Name	Other names	County	Location	Dates	Status	Notes	Media
East Sioux Falls		Minnehaha					The former site of East Sioux Falls in 2009.
Elizabethtown		Lawrence				Later incorporated into Deadwood It was between Montana City and Foundation City, in Whitewood Gulch, and was big enough, in 1876, to have its own Fourth of July Celebration, with an oration by A.B. Chapline. The 1880 census shows a population of 316.	
Elmore		Lawrence	About 14 miles (22.5 km) south of Spearfish.	?-1933 or 1934	Abandoned	"Elmore" was named for the Mike Elmore, a railroad contractor. It was the spot from which the Chicago Burlington and Quincy began its narrow-gauge climb up the east side of Spearfish Canyon, along Annie Creek. The line washed out in 1933 or 1934 and was abandoned.	
Emmet		Union		1871-?	Neglected		
Englewood		Lawrence				Also called "Ten Mile Ranch".	
Etta	Etta Camp	Pennington			Barren		
Eureka		Pennington				Not to be confused with Eureka, from McPherson County.	
Evans Place		Lawrence			Barren	Its exact location is unknown. This town was not part of the more famous Evans, near Hot Springs, but was near Deadwood, on Mineral Lot No. 735.	
Everts		Walworth	Latitude: 45.4486025 Longitude: -100.3059646	1900 -	Barren	Founded in 1900 when a branch line of the Milwaukee Railroad came through the area. The town was named for Olive Evarts, spouse of Gene Overholser, a local landowner, who owned the land on which the train tracks were, eventually, laid. The town became an important cattle shipping point for the great cattle ranches located west of the Missouri Trunk. The town soon boasted of: saloons, hotels, brothels, gambling houses and supply stores of many descriptions. A bridge built over the Missouri Trunk nearby dramatically reduced business needs in the community and it, eventually, faded to ghost town status. After this, the community was abandoned, many of the buildings were moved to nearby Glenham. (SD-T17/p. 66,130)	
Fair View		Pennington			Barren	Existed around 1887. The book Cow-boys and Colonels has a picture of the town, showing a saw mill, three or four houses and an odd structure, that looks like a framework for a large stamp mill. The town was on Little Rapid Creek, near where Little Gimlet Creek enters it.	
Farmingdale		Pennington			Abandoned	The ghost town of Farmingdale is named after the surrounding area, being capable of sustaining farmland. The town rests on the banks of Rapid Creek. The abandoned railroad grade and State Route 44 cut through the center of town.	
Firesteel	Lakota: Čhaȟlíok'e Otȟúŋwahe	Dewey		1910-?	Abandoned	Firesteel is an unincorporated community on the Cheyenne River Indian Reservation, in Dewey County, South Dakota, United States. It was known for being a prominent coal mining community in the early 1900s.	
Flatiron		Lawrence		1890s-?	Neglected	Not to be confused with the other Flatiron. It was a successful mining town from the 1890s until about the 1930s.	
Flatiron		Lawrence		c. 1921-?	Barren	Not to be confused with the Flatiron, which was much bigger and existed long before this town.	
Flora		Custer		1890s	Barren	Was a tin mining town. Its exact location is unknown.	
Floral	Florence	Pennington			Neglected	Also called "Florence". Not to be confused with Florence, South Dakota, located in Codington County; or the similarly named ghost town Flora.	
Folsom		Custer				Was a gold mining town.	
Forest City						Submerged under Lake Oahe.	
Fountain City	Mountain City	Lawrence				Was incorporated into Deadwood	
Gayville	Troy	Lawrence				Was an early placer mining camp, that had a significant population, but was later absorbed into Deadwood. Not to be confused with the Gayville, from Yankton County.	
Gibralter	Also spelled Gibraltar.	Meade		1877-?	Barren		
Glendale	Otho	Pennington		1880s-?			
Golden Centre		Lawrence				From Rochford, South Dakota, which was, apparently, a close by neighbor. Other local camps included: Montezuma, Golden Centre, Tigerville, Montana City, Ochre City, Sitting Bull, Florence, Castleton and Elkorn. For a time, it was rumored that the western part of Pennington County would split and become Martin County, and would make Rochford the county seat, but no such action was ever taken. That year, Rochford worried that the nearby camp of Golden Centre would take over, as the central point of trade.	
Golden Summit		Pennington				Also called "Summit". Not to be confused with Summit, also located in Pennington County.	
Golden West		Pennington		c. 1900-c. 1920	Barren	Photo of mine remains at Golden West, South Dakota	
Gold Hill		Lawrence				According to Parker and Lambert's Black Hills Ghost Towns, the location of Gold Hill was described as being laid out in 1877 on Whitewood Creek, at the mouth of the Reno Creek, about 3 miles (4.8 km) above Kirk.	
Gopher		Corson		1918-1940s?	Barren	Interesting article here, about the county of Corson itself and why there are many towns (about 10 miles (16.1 km) apart). It involves the rail roads and their steam engines needing to be filled with water about every 10 miles. Found information on Gopher, in "WPA South Dakota Place Names" (1941) - at the time of publication, the town population was 13 and still had a post maintained there. The town was named after the common native rodent. It was founded in 1918 and, in 1940, the property remaining in the village, including a store, post office and other buildings, were sold for taxes, sold for "lock stock and barrel", for $150.	
Gothland		Union				Post office was established June 25, 1873 and discontinued October 19, 1891.	
Grandview		Pennington			Barren	"McGuire's Coming Empire" shows the town of Grandview about 7 miles (11.3 km) northwest of Pactola, just at the south fork of the Boxelder Creek, south of the Lawrence County.	
Greenwood		Lawrence		1885-1912	Barren	Also called "Laflin". The last house was torn down in 1971.	
Gregory		Lawrence		1879-?	Barren	Also called "Montana City". Not to be confused with the Gregory, South Dakota, located in Gregory County; or the other Montana City from Lawrence County.	
Griggs		Lawrence			Barren	Griggs was a silver camp on Bear Butte Creek, half a mile (0.8 km) north of Galena, at the mouth of Butcher Gulch. It was a station on the narrow gauge Deadwood Central and, possibly, also on Jim Hardin's Branch Mint Line.	
Hagginsville						The Homestake Company had its terminus there.	
Hammer		Roberts		?-1930s	Neglected		
Harney		Pennington		1876-1900	Abandoned	Not to be confused with the military encampment by the same name, in Custer County. Harney, 2 miles (3.2 km) of west of Keystone on Battle Creek, was laid out in 1876 and, soon, had a school and post office, in addition to the usual homes and business establishments. Gold deposits "panned" out by 1878 and were abandoned. In 1883, the Harney Hydraulic Gold Mining Company was organized, with A.J. Simmon, William Claggett and T.H. Russell as chief incorporators. They built two flumes, one from Grizzly Creek and the other from Battle Creek. The two combined at the mouth of Grizzly Gulch, to pass over its canyon, on a trestle 200 feet (61 m) high and 700 feet (213.4 m) long. Despite these efforts, Harney was pretty well deserted by 1900 and had, at that time, neither a school, nor post office.	
Hayward		Pennington		11/1876-?	Abandoned	Also spelled "Hayword". Gold was discovered at Hayward by Charles Phillips, Phillip Brown and Judge Willis, in the fall of 1876, but the area was abandoned when Indians shot up the camp. In November of the same year, Charles Hayward and James E. Carpenter with six others came in from Custer and laid out a town, which they named after Hayward. Within six months, there were 300 miners and, by April 1877, the town became the temporary county seat of Custer County. However, since Hayward was not in Custer County, Custer eventually won out as the county seat. For a while, Hayward was the site of an extensive hydraulic mining and a post office and school were set up. It is about 7 miles (11.3 km) east of Keystone, on the Hermosa Road.	
Heppner		Fall River					
Hillhead		Marshall		1915-1970s	Neglected	Also called "Hilltop" or "Airmont".	
Hillside		Butte			Neglected		
Hill Side		Union					
Hooker		Turner			Abandoned		
Hoover		Butte					
Hornblende Camp		Pennington		1899-1915	Barren	Also called "Horneblende".	
Huseboe		Corson			Neglected	Also called "Lightcap". Article here, about the history of the town.	
Hustleton		Pennington				Existed around January 1877. The Cheyenne Daily Leader, on January 12, 1877, mentioned this mining community, named for its recorder, as being on the west side of Battle Creek where the gulch opens out towards Hayward City, which would probably be at the mouth of the gorge.	

=== I through L ===
Name	Other Names	County	Location	Dates	Status	Notes	Media
Igloo	Black Hills Ordnance Depot	Fall River		c. 1942-after 1970	Abandoned	Also known as the Black Hills Ordnance Depot, it was a residential community, located near a munitions storage and maintenance facility.	Storage building in Igloo, photographed in 2008.
Imlay		Jackson		1907-?	Neglected		
Ivanhoe		Custer			Barren	Not to be confused with Yamboya, which was also called "Ivanhoe", but was a separate community. Ivanhoe was described in the "Rand McNally" Atlas as having railroad service and no post office. Ivanhoe was on a branch of Coolidge Creek. It once had a half dozen houses. Confusingly, this town was also called "Yamboya".	Photo here
Junction City		Custer		c. 09/1879-c. 1881	Neglected	Junction City, on Tenderfoot Gulch, was named for the Grand Junction mine and appears to have been in existence as early as September 1879. The name "Junction City" applies to quite a wide area, the mine itself, up and down Tenderfoot Gulch, and clear over to the Junction Ranger Station. The mine closed down in 1881, having processes 7,000 tons of ore that yielded only $3.58 worth of gold to the ton.	
Kiddville		Custer		before September 20, 1879-?	Neglected	Kiddville was an early placer mining camp, mentioned as early as Sept. 20th 1879, as being 4 miles (6.4 km) up French Creek from Custer. Early maps place it near the Penobscot Mine.	
Lakeview		Todd			Neglected	Only the school and church are still in use by the farming community, but the actual town no longer exists.	
Lancaster City		Lawrence			Barren		
Lauzon		Custer			Neglected	Lauzon once had a store and a post office, surrounded by other buildings.	
LeBeau		Walworth			Barren (submerged)	It is submerged beneath Lake Oahe.	
Lentz		Lawrence				A small mining town in Lawrence county, 7 miles (11.3 km) west of Iron Creek, the railroad station. Population: 25. 1909 "Business Directory" found here.	
Lexington		Lawrence		1903-?	Barren	"The Black Hills Illustrated" (page 44) has a view, labeled "Lexington", apparently a mine, but, probably, also the name giving to the community around it. The Lexington Hill mine formed in 1903.	
Lily		Day		1883-2017	Dissolved	Dissolved in March 2017, by the Day County court, due to its population reaching zero.	
Lithia		Fall River			Barren	Most likely submerged beneath Angostura Lake. A post office in Fall River county, 16 miles (25.8 km) southeast of Hot Springs, the nearest railroad point. Population: 6. "Business Directory" from 1909 can be found here.	
Lone Camp		Lawrence	Unknown		Barren	Was an early mining camp. The exact location is unknown, but it was around Maitland and Carbonate. This was a Black Hills mining camp, more or less in the same area as Garden City (Maitland), Carbonate Camp and Grizzly Gulch, apparently in area north and west of Deadwood and Lead.	
Lookout		Pennington		c. 1884-c. 1890	Neglected	The residential community of Fort Lookout. Lookout was an early mining camp on Castle Creek, about 4 miles (6.4 km) west of Mystic. It was probably named for the Lookout mine, discovered in 1882 by J.T. Hooper and F.J. Ayers. As early as 1884, there was a sawmill in Lookout, run by Fisher and Hunter, and 126 men were busy digging the ditch to provide water to power Robinson and Hawgood's Spread Eagle Mine. More information found here, including location.	
Lost Camp		Lawrence			Neglected	May have been, at one time, a large settlement, but even the older maps do not show any houses at all. It is 1/2 mile (0.8 km) southwest of Terry Peak.	
Luffman		Marshall			Barren	The railroad didn't come to town, so the town moved to Lake City. Information found here. "Business Directory" from 1909 found here. A post office in Marshall county, 20 miles (32.2 km) west of Sisseton, the nearest railroad point. Population: 20.	

=== M through O ===
Name	Other names	County	Location	Dates	Status	Notes	Media
Macy		Butte		c.1893-c.1907		Found earliest map (Rand McNally and Company): 1893, on Main Creek in North Butte County, between Gustave and Hay Stack Buttes. Latest map showing it existing is P.F. Collier and Son, 1907. Business gazettes show no railroad, did find mention of a cemetery, but nothing shows at location and no known graves or photos on FindAGrave.	
Maitland	Midland, Garden City, Sherman	Lawrence		1877-c. 1915	Neglected	Not to be confused with the Maitland, in Fall River County.	
Maitland		Fall River			Barren	Maitland is a crossroads, south of the Cheyenne, on Hat Creek, according to "Black Hills Ghost Towns", by Parker and Lambert. Early atlases show it as a location of a post office and little else. Not to be confused with Maitland in Lawrence County.	
Manchester		Kingsbury		June 29, 1881-June 24, 2003	Barren	The town was already in decline when it was completely destroyed during the 2003 South Dakota tornado outbreak. All that remains are the foundations of the buildings.	Aerial view of Manchester after the tornado outbreak that destroyed the town in 2003.
March		Charles Mix					
Marietta		Fall River			Barren	Marietta is the location of the Tubbs Gravel Pit. Located on CB&Q tracks, near the Cheyenne River, about 8 miles (12.9 km) N-W of Edgemont.	
Martin Valley		Custer				Was, once, the center of a widely scattered community and had a school and a post office. The name came from the Martin Family, owners of the 7-11 Ranch, in the valley.	
Mason		Butte					
Maurice		Lawrence				Now, the site of the power plant for the Homestake Mine.	
Maverick		Pennington			Neglected	Existed around 1891. Adreas' Atlas shows Maverick as a small village and a post office on a northwest branch of Spring Creek. In 1891, it had a population of 19, but the post office had gone out of business.	
Mayo		Custer			Neglected	In its early days, Mayo seem to have been the center of, at least, 3 clusters of houses. The area is to the west of U.S. 385, about 7 miles (11.3 km) south of Custer, across the highway, from Beecher's Rock.	
Melvin		Custer					
Merritt		Lawrence			Barren		
Middle Boxelder		Lawrence	Unknown		Barren	This town's existence was proven by early photographs. However, its exact location is unknown.	
Minneapolis		Pennington			Barren	About a mile (1.6 km) N-E of Rochford, on Silver Creek, Minneapolis was the site of a number of shallow mines and a mill to process whatever ores they found. Nearby is Richards Spring.	
Minnelusa		Pennington			Barren	Existed in 1920. Was the site of a granite crushing operation, which provided much of the gravel to pave Rapid City's streets.	
Minnesela		Butte		1882-1901	Barren	The first county seat of Butte County, it was notable for its rivalry with the neighboring town of Belle Fourche, in the 1890s.	
Mogul		Lawrence				The Mogul-Horseshoe Company was at this location and, apparently, used the Welcome (II) and the Mogul spurs of the Deadwood Central line that came S-W, from Kirk. The company was an important one, producing over $7,000,000 in gold, during its years of operation. See also Welcome II.	
Montana City		Lawrence		1879-?		Not to be confused with Gregory, South Dakota, which was also called "Montana City" and was also located in Lawrence County. Montana City, later, became part of Deadwood.	
Montezuma		Lawrence		1879-		Laid out in 1879, a scant mile up Irish Gulch, from Rochford, and named for the nearby Montezuma mine.	
Moon		Pennington			Neglected		
Morganfield		Union				No real information discovered, other than it was a ghost town in Union County.	
Moss City		Custer	Unknown			Its exact location is unknown. It was most likely in eastern Custer County. It had a post office during the Black Hills Gold Rush days, but its population was never determined.	
Myers City	Myersville	Pennington			Neglected		
Mystic	Sitting Bull	Pennington			Abandoned		
Nahant		Lawrence		1890-?	Barren		
Nasby		Lawrence			Barren	Existed around 1910 as a booming logging camp.	
Nerve City		Lawrence		1896		Located about 1,500 feet (460 m) north of Balmoral.	
New Berlin		Lawrence		1878-?	Barren		
New Chicago		Lawrence		c. 1875-1877	Barren	Was a camp later absorbed into Maitland, South Dakota.	
Newton City		Pennington		c. 1878-?	Barren	Newton City was about a mile (1.6 km) S-E of Tigerville. Nothing remains of it.	
North Galena	Carter City	Lawrence	Unknown		Barren	The exact location is unknown, but it was probably somewhere around Galena.	
Novak	Cindell Spur	Lawrence			Neglected		
Nugget City		Lawrence		c.1898-?	Barren	Was in existence before or around 1898.	
Oak Flat		Lawrence			Barren	Site of the E. Bowen Lumber Mill and the Megary Hotel. It is 2 1/2 miles (4 km) east of Deadwood and the Centennial Road to Crook City.	
Ochre City		Pennington			Barren	Was a booming mining community around 1879.	
Okobojo		Sully			Neglected		
Old Ashton		Spink			Neglected		
Ordway		Brown					
Oro	North Lead	Lawrence					
Oreville		Pennington		1890		1890 tin mining town. Even early maps show only one house.	
Otis		Custer			Barren	The Custer State Game Lodge was built on the site of the town's mill.	

=== P through R ===
Name	Other names	County	Location	Dates	Status	Notes	Media
Pactola		Pennington			Barren (submerged)	Submerged beneath Pactola Lake.	
Pearl City		Beadle			Barren	A town, named Pearl, from Beadle County is visible on the 1893 "Rand McNally and Company" maps. An aerial map of the town was drawn in 1913. Looking at street view of the area, nothing is left. Population of the area is showing 23.	
Pedro		Pennington					
Perry	Lewisville	Lawrence				Also called "Lewisville". Now, known as Roubaix, in Lawrence County. Name changed, to stop confusion between Perry and Terry.	
Pine Grove		Lawrence	Unknown		Barren	The only indication of the site is that it was within twenty miles (32.2 km) of Deadwood.	
Pinkerton		Pennington			Barren	Andreas' Atlas shows Pinkerton as a small village, on the north side of Boxelder Creek. It was probably a mile (1.6 km) of the present day fish farm, on the site of the old town of Merritt.	
Placerville		Pennington			Barren	Originally, a placer camp and so named, for its gold deposit. It is on SD 40 (the Rimrock Highway), about 12 miles (19.3 km) west of Rapid City.	
Pluma		Lawrence			Abandoned	Located on the main road, between Deadwood and Lead. Gold mining mill.	
Poorman's Gulch		Lawrence	Unknown		Barren	An early mining camp, near Central City. Its exact location is unknown.	
Postville		Meade			Barren	Was in existence around 1891.	
Potato Town	Potato Creek	Lawrence			Barren	Also called "Potato Creek", after the town it was located on.	
Preston		Lawrence		c. 1897-?	Neglected	Was in the same area as Balmoral, Dacy and Cyanide.	
Purewater		Todd			Neglected	Located 10 miles (16.1 km) north and one mile (1.6 km) east of Crookston, Nebraska, right north of the state line (at which the Nebraska paved road ends and becomes gravel in South Dakota). The towns (Lakeview and Purewater) are accessible only via dirt roads.	
Quartz City		Lawrence	Unknown	01/1878-?	Barren	Due to the inaccuracy of the maps drawn of the area, its exact location is unknown. It was, possibly, on a line between Roubaix and Nemo.	
Queen Bee		Pennington		1880s-1930s	Barren	A large fire destroyed all remains of the town, in the 1930s.	
Ragged Top		Lawrence		1880s-c. 1915	Neglected	Was also the name of the school district and mining district in which Preston, Cyanide, Dacy and Balmoral were also included.	
Reausaw	Also spelled Reavsaw	Lawrence			Abandoned		
Red Fern		Lawrence			Barren	Named in 1891 or 1892 for Albert Redfern, a railroad man, was a section house on the Burlington Railroad, from Hill City to Deadwood.	
Redwater		Butte			Barren	Existed around 1921.	
Reed		Butte		1905-1910	Neglected	Only the school house remains.	
Richmond		Lawrence		c. 1880-c. 1945	Neglected	Richmond was the end of the Deadwood Central line to the Galena area and was named for the Richmond (later, the Double Rainbow) mine.	
Rockerville	Rockville	Pennington		1870s-1930s	Historic	The site has been rebuilt and is, now, a tourist attraction.	rebuilt buildings at the site
Rosedale		Pennington				Existed around 1935.	
Rossville		Pennington				Was in existence around 1883.	
Runkel	Also spelled Runkle.	Meade		c. 1900-?	Barren	The only real marker of the town is an apple orchard that still stands, today.	

=== S through T ===
Name	Other names	County	Location	Dates	Status	Notes	Media
Sacora		Meade			Barren	Existed around 1891. The 1891 map shows it between Postville and Blackhawk, on the Chicago and North Western Railroad, north of Rapid City.	
Safe Investment	Spruce	Lawrence				Home of the Safe Investment Gold Mining Company. Small community on Boxelder Creek, on the Black Hills and Fort Pierre Railroad, between Novak and Greenwood.	
Sampont		Butte				There was a post office there, no dates found.	
Saratoga		Lawrence			Barren	An 1883 map shows this town at the headwaters of a creek, which branches off of the Bear Butte Creek, below Sturgis. The map is rather inaccurate, but it shows the town about 4 1/2 miles (7.2 km) S-W of Sturgis, on a line between Sturgis and Lead.	
Sheridan	Golden City	Pennington		fall 1875-after 1930	Barren (submerged)	Submerged under Sheridan Lake.	
Silver City		Lawrence				An early mining town, on Bald Mountain. Not to be confused with the Silver City in Pennington County, which is still active.	
Slabtown		Lawrence				The town only survived for two years. Its post office was, later, moved to Novak.	
Snoma		Butte		1885-?	Barren	The town was, once, home to the Snoma Finnish Cemetery, an NRHP-listed place. It was, probably, intended to be called "Suomi" or "Suoma".	
South Bend		Lawrence				It had a population of 116 in 1880, but when it was abandoned, the residents moved to Central City.	
Sparta City		Lawrence		1878-?	Barren	Its exact location is unknown.	
Spokane		Custer		c. 1890	Neglected	A few homes still stand. The mine was filled in by USFS.	
Spring-On-The-Hill		Custer			Barren	A famous stop, on trail up to Custer. It is about 20 miles (32.2 km) S-W of Custer, in Red Canyon. It was a scene of a lively Indian fight, involving Captain J. Hunter and 6 other men, in which Hunter was killed.	
Squaw Creek		Lawrence	Unknown		Barren	Its exact location is unknown.	
Stamford		Jackson		1909-1934		Burned down 3 times, before its closing.	
String Town Logging Camp		Lawrence		1899-1908		Center, top line of section 0, T2N-R5E. The camp, which served the important "Government Sale, Number one" of National Forest timber, was on Jim Creek, near Nemo. The timber sale was in T25-R5E; cutting began in 1899 and was completed in 1908.	
Summit		Custer				This Summit was on the Fremont, Elkhorn and Missouri Valley Railroad, between Rapid City and Hot Spring or, more specifically, between Buffalo Gap and Fairburn. In 1901, there seems to have been a siding and, perhaps, three houses.	
Summit		Lawrence				There seems to be plenty of towns and areas, known as Summit. This one was on a branch of the Burlington Railroad, between Englewood and Lead.	
Summit		Pennington				On the Chicago and North Western, between Rapid City and Hot Springs. This Summit was just north of Spring Creek, about 8 miles (12.9 km) north of Hermosa.	
Sylvan City		Custer			Barren	Kingsbury "History of Dakota" mentions this city more or less as an adjunct to the Northern Star, Mecca and Placer gold and mica mines. Sylvan City, apparently, housed a axle-grease factory, making use of ground mica as a lubricant.	
Teddy Bear		Pennington			Neglected		
Teepee		Lawrence			Barren	Early maps show Teepee as a town, but no other records of it appears. It was, probably, near the present Tepee Ranger Station. Records show that there was a postmaster here, in 1918. Found on 1916 (Chicago: Rand McNally and Co., 1916; from The Ideal Atlas of the World) map of Pennington County, Northwest corner of county. Looking at other maps around the same time, I found Teepee (Tepee) in Lawrence County, around Crooks Tower (Tepee). Tepee, Pennington Co., SD - 1909 "Business Directory". A post office in Pennington county, 30 miles (48.3 km) northwest of Hill City, the nearest railroad point. Population: 10. (No businesses listed).	
Tenderfoot		Custer			Neglected	Tenderfoot, along the Chicago, Burlington and Quincy Railroad, between Hill City and Custer, is in Tenderfoot Gulch and either named, or took the name of the Tenderfoot group of tin mines. These claims, originally, belonging to the Harney Peak Tin Mining, milling and manufacturing company. It is about 8 miles (12.9 km) south of Hill City.	
Terraville		Lawrence		1877-1982	Barren		
Terry		Lawrence		1876-?	Barren		
Texana		Lawrence				Texana seems to have consisted of a house or two along the Fremont, Elkhorn and Missouri Railroad, from Trojan to Central City. The railroad, here, makes a deep hairpin loop to the west, that is nearly half-a-mile (0.8 km) long and Texana laid just south of the base of the loop and south of Deadwood Creek.	
Texas Town	Texas	Union			Barren	All that remains is a cemetery.	
Tigerville	Tiger City	Pennington		1878-1885	Neglected		
Tinton		Lawrence		?-1950s	Neglected		Photo taken 2008
Tepee		Pennington			Neglected	Same as Teepee, just different spellings on different maps, as well as slight differences in location. hence the two different counties.	
Travare		Roberts			Neglected	Was the original county seat of Roberts County.	
Trojan	Portland	Lawrence		?-1959	Neglected		
Twilight		Butte		1917-?	Barren	Established as a post office in 1914, at the Oens Ranch, and was called "Oens Ranch", until 1917. Then, the patrons decided they wanted a new name, so each suggested a name and the list was sent to the post office department, who decided on "Twilight", the last name on the list. Among other names suggested were: Sage Brush and Trail Creek. Source	
Two-Bit		Lawrence	2 miles (3.2 km) east of Deadwood	1876-1900s	Barren	Also called "Two Bit". Started during the gold rush of 1876, but did not get booming, until 1892 when the Gold Mountain Mining Company began development. In 1897, the Hardin properties began and, by 1899, were shipping 30 tons of pyrite a day to the Golden Rewards smelter, at Astoria. As late as 1916, the Mary Group, a late comer, shipped 1,600 pounds (725.8 kg) of tungsten ore, as did the Seth R. Group.	

=== V through Z ===
Name	Other names	County	Location	Dates	Status	Notes
Victoria		Lawrence				Not to be confused with the Pennington County location.
Victoria		Pennington				Not to be confused with the Lawrence County location.
Virginia City	Virginia Moll	Lawrence				Not to be confused with Carbonate, which was, alternatively, called "West Virginia" or, simply, "Virginia".
Volunteer		Meade			Barren	Existed in the early 1900s.
Wealthy		Pennington	3 miles (4.8 km) north of Keystone.		Barren	Probably got its name from the Wealthy Mine. It was at the head of Tepee Gulch, 3 miles north of Keystone.
Westford		Custer	Coordinates: 43.704326, -103.440146		Barren	Nothing remains.
Weta		Jackson		1907-?	Neglected	
Whitetail		Lawrence				Existed around 1900. A junction of the Burlington line, from Trojan to Lead, with that leading off west, to Bucks. In 1900, there were about half a dozen houses in the vicinity.
Whitewood City		Lawrence			Barren	Not to be confused with Whitewood, which is still an active community.
Williamsburg		Lawrence	Unknown		Barren	The exact location is unknown. The town existed in the early days of the Black Hills Gold Rush.
Winship		Brown		1889-?	Barren	
Woodville		Lawrence				Woodville, also known as "Lake Station" and "The Lake", from a small pond nearby, was a wood cutting camp, which supplied fuel for the locomotives which ran between Englewood and Piedmont. It was also the scene of several attempts to rob the Homestake payroll train; the most famous occurred on September 12, 1888, when John Wilson, Jack Doherty, Alfred G. Nickerson and a man named Murphy ran into a good deal of trouble, while making the attempt.
Yamboya	Ivanhoe	Custer			Barren	Also called "Ivanhoe". Not to be confused with the other settlement called "Ivanhoe", which was also in Custer County, but was a different town.
Young		Pennington			Barren	It was mentioned in a newspaper, in the fall of 1879.
