= Blacktail, South Dakota =

Blacktail, South Dakota Black Tail
- Ghost town
- Location of Blacktail in South Dakota
- Coordinates: 44.3699843°N 103.7601982°W
- Country: United States
- State: South Dakota
- County: Lawrence
- Elevation: 4,777 ft (1,456 m)
- Time zone: UTC-7 (MST)
  - Summer (DST): UTC-6 (MDT)

Blacktail (also known as Black Tail) is a ghost town in Lawrence County, South Dakota, United States.

Blacktail was named for the black-tailed deer spotted by a settler near the town site. Blacktail was an early mining camp in which some of the Homestake Mine's mills operated. While the town flourished for a while, it eventually became a ghost town. It was located between Central City and Gayville, and in the area where Blacktail Gulch and Bobtail Gulch meet. The site has an elevation of 4,777 feet (1,456 m).

== See also ==
- Lead, South Dakota
