= James Ridpath =

American politician

James B. Ridpath
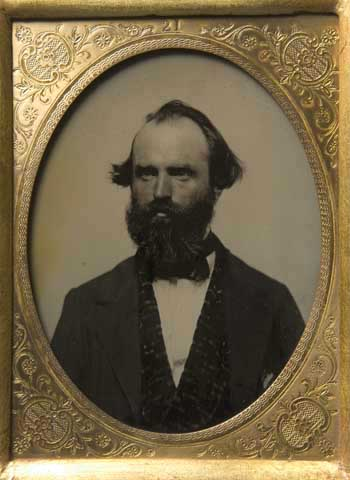
- Ridpath c. 1858

Member of the Minnesota Senate from the 12th District
- In office December 2, 1857 – December 6, 1859
- Preceded by: Position established
- Succeeded by: John T. Averill

Personal details
- Born: January 4, 1817 Montgomery County, Virginia, U.S.
- Died: April 20, 1901 (aged 84) Spokane, Washington, U.S.
- Children: John Clark Ridpath (son)

James B. Ridpath (January 4, 1817 – April 20, 1901), alternatively spelled as James Redpath, was an American businessman, politician, and founding citizen of Carbonate, South Dakota. During his political career Ridpath served in the Minnesota Legislature and the Dakota Territory Legislature. Ridpath was the father of American educator, writer, and historian John Clark Ridpath and American businessman William Marion Ridpath who built the Ridpath Hotel.

== Early life ==
Ridpath was born on January 4, 1817, in Montgomery County, Virginia. In 1837 at the age of 20, Ridpath moved to Fillmore, Indiana in Putnam County. Ridpath later moved to Minnesota Territory in the 1850s and settled in the village of Tepeeotah four miles east of Wabasha, Minnesota. Tepeeotah was founded in the autumn of 1856 by Thomas H. Ford.^{:142}

== Political career ==
Ridpath began his political career in 1857, when he ran for a seat in the Minnesota Senate representing Minnesota's 12th Senate district. At the time the district included Wabasha County, Minnesota. Ridpath was the first senator to represent Wabasha County in the newly formed Minnesota Senate.^{:47} Ridpath won the election on October 13, 1857, and would serve in the 1st Minnesota Legislature from December 2, 1857, to December 6, 1859. During his term Ridpath was a member of the Agriculture and Manufactures, Education and Sciences, and Ways and Means committees. Ridpath was succeeded by John T. Averill as the representative of the 12th Senate district. Ridpath later served in the Dakota Territory Senate.

== Business ventures and later life ==
By 1878 Ridpath moved to the city of Sheridan in Dakota Territory near the Black Hills in Pennington County where he worked as the city's postmaster. In 1880 Ridpath moved to Lawrence County, South Dakota where he founded a silver mine which he named "West Virginia". The mine was later named "Virginia" and then "Carbonate Camp" due to the abundance of carbonate mineral and ore in the area. Ridpath's settlement around the mine eventually became the city of Carbonate, South Dakota, which is now a ghost town. The most prominent mine Ridpath owned was the Ragged Top Mine in the nearby settlement of Ragged Top, South Dakota.

In 1892 Ridpath was a Republican candidate for justice of the peace in Hot Springs, South Dakota, he was sworn into service a year later in 1893. Ridpath later moved to Spokane, Washington to live closer to his family. Ridpath died on April 20, 1901, in Spokane.

== Personal life ==
Ridpath was the father of John Clark Ridpath and William Marion Ridpath, both were born in Fillmore, Indiana. John was the author and writer of Cyclopedia of Universal History. Meanwhile, William was a teacher and lawyer who later served in the Indiana General Assembly and fought in the American Civil War. Following his military service William was appointed by Chester A. Arthur to serve as an Indian agent in Spokane. William was later the builder and proprietor of the Ridpath Hotel.
