= Bismuth, South Dakota =

- Ghost town
- Location of Bismuth in South Dakota.
- Coordinates: 43°51′00″N 103°23′53″W
- Country: United States
- State: South Dakota
- County: Custer
- Elevation: 4,472 ft (1,363 m)
- Time zone: UTC-7 (MST)
  - Summer (DST): UTC-6 (MDT)

Bismuth is a ghost town in the Black Hills of Custer County, South Dakota, United States.

== Etymology ==
The name Bismuth refers to the metal bismuth. It is unclear why this is the town name. Bismuth is mined in the United States; however, South Dakota has no documented bismuth mining claims, past or present.

== History ==
=== Prior to settlement ===
The region surrounding Bismuth was a hunting ground and sacred territory of the Western Sioux, as well as the Cheyenne, Kiowa, and Arapaho.

The 1868 Treaty of Fort Laramie guaranteed Black Hills land rights to the Sioux and Arapaho. However, a military expedition led by George Armstrong Custer found gold in 1874, causing the Black Hills Gold Rush. Native groups resisted the thousands of white settlers that came to the area over the next year; the conflicts culminated in the Great Sioux War of 1876. Despite Native American victory at the Battle of the Little Bighorn, the war resulted in the Sioux relinquishing their rights to the Black Hills to the United States government in 1877. The 1874 gold rush and subsequent land seizure gave rise to a series of boomtowns, mines, and other settlements in the region, including Bismuth.

=== Inhabitation ===
Bismuth existed circa 1901 as a small community of half a dozen homes. It once included a store and a baseball team. As of 1974, an old house remained of the town, but it is unknown if any structures are still standing. The site is now part of a wildlife preserve and a manmade lake.

== Geography ==
Bismuth is located in the Black Hills National Forest, on the eastern edge of the Black Elk Wilderness. It was on the modern day site of Lakota Lake, Custer County. Bismuth is approximately 1.5 miles (2.4 km) northwest of the ghost town of Spokane and five miles southeast of Mount Rushmore.

== Ecology ==
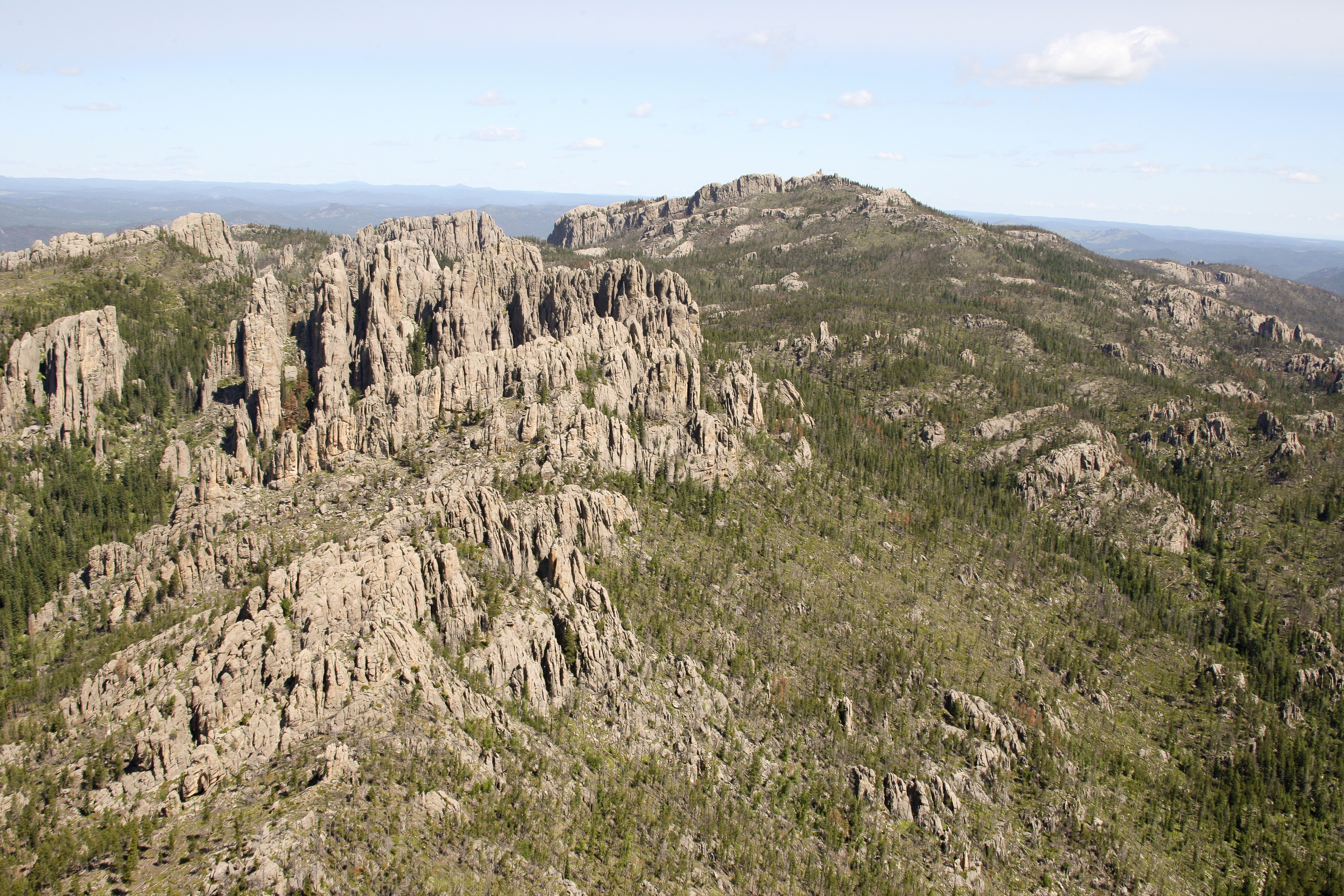
An aerial view of the Black Elk Wilderness, the region where Bismuth was located

Like much of the Black Hills, Bismuth has a mixture of species commonly found in the Rocky Mountains, Great Plains, northern boreal forests, and eastern deciduous forests. Ponderosa pines are the most common tree, but spruce, aspen, birch and oak also grow in the region. There are large white-tailed deer and mule deer populations as well as a smaller elk population. Mountain lion sightings are rare, but coyote sightings are frequent. Native bird species include mountain bluebirds, western tanagers, goshawks, and ospreys. Bald eagles occasionally visit in the winter.

The area where Bismuth stood is now part of the Norbeck Wildlife Preserve, named for South Dakota conservationist and politician Peter Norbeck. It was established by the Norbeck Organic Act of June 5, 1920. The preserve encompasses the Black Elk Wilderness, named after Black Elk, an Oglala Lakota holy man.

Lakota Lake provides rainbow trout fishing and permits non-motorized boating. There is also a picnic area and access to the system of Iron Creek Trails.
