= Carbonate, South Dakota =

Carbonate Carbonate Camp, Virginia, West Virginia
- Ghost town
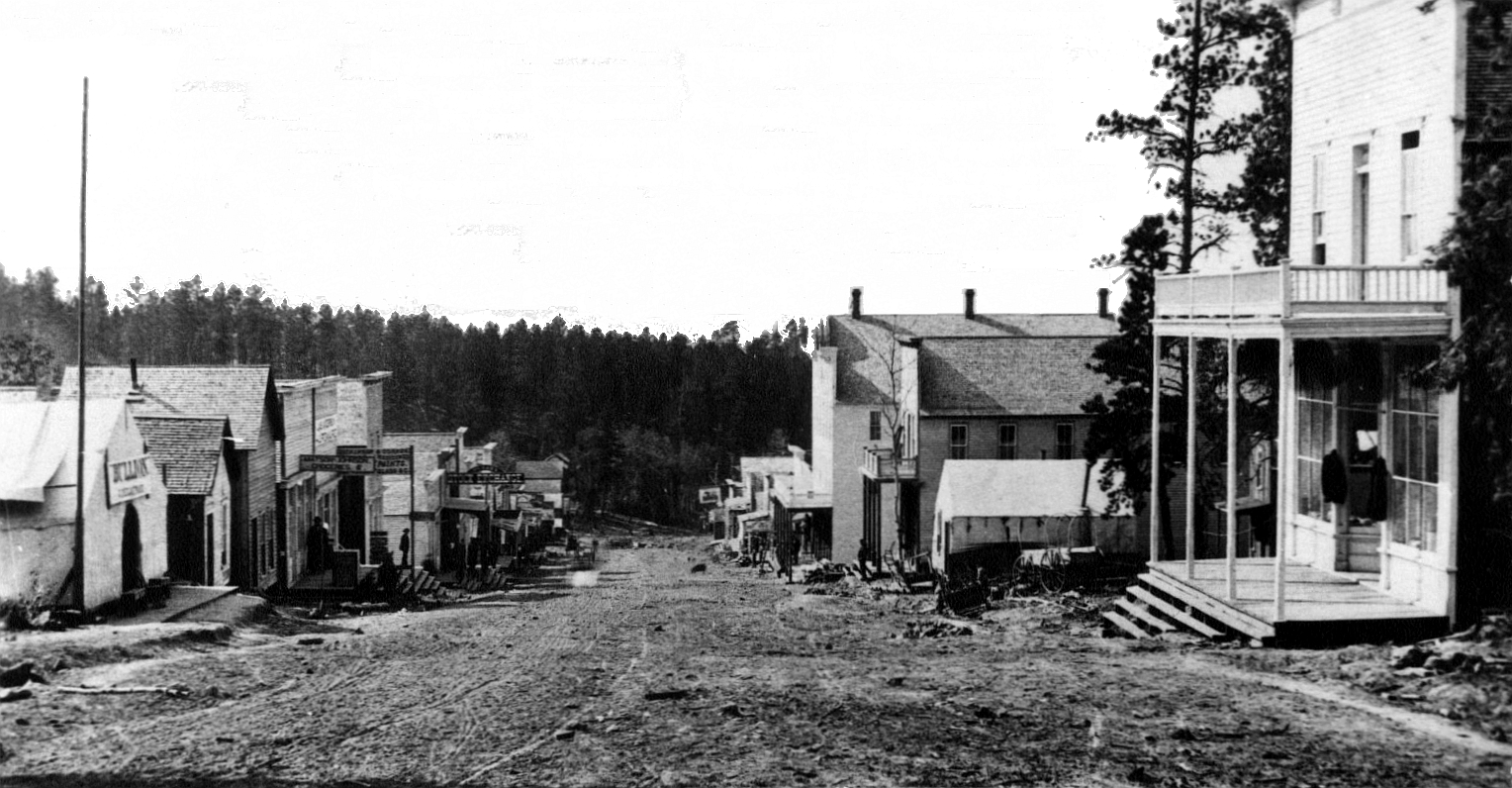
- Carbonate, 1890

- Location within South Dakota Location within the United States
- Coordinates: 44°24′00″N 103°52′07″W
- Country: United States of America
- State: South Dakota
- County: Lawrence County
- Established: 1881
- Abandoned: 1939
- Founder: James Ridpath
- Named for: carbonate ore
- Elevation: 5,558 ft (1,694 m)
- Time zone: UTC-7 (MST)
  - Summer (DST): UTC-6 (MDT)

Carbonate, also known as Carbonate Camp, West Virginia, Virginia, and Carbonate City, is a ghost town located in Lawrence County, South Dakota, United States.

== Naming ==
The town was first known as West Virginia, then Virginia, and later Carbonate Camp and Carbonate for its carbonate mineral mining.

== History ==
James Ridpath first settled the area c. 1880 and staked out the West Virginia Mine. There, he discovered the carbonate ore, a mixture of silver and lead, that would cause the town to prosper. Carbonate was founded in July 1881 after an article appeared in the Black Hills Daily Times about the ore and created an influx of settlers. By August, 200 men had settled in the town in tents and began placer mining for gold; a wagon road to Spearfish was completed that same month. A reservoir was built so that the residents would not have to use the same springs that the livestock did. A fund dedicated to growing the camp began in Deadwood, and several saloons, shops, and restaurants moved into the town. Two barber shops, two laundries, an office, and a drug store also emerged, among other businesses. The Carbonate Reporter was the first newspaper in the town. By September, the outside interest in the town had started to fade, and the rush to settle in Carbonate slowed. In June 1883, mining operations were suspended because the roads had fallen into such disrepair that they could not be used. Ridpath, hoping to attract newcomers, planted an apple orchard and a strawberry bed.

The town boomed again in 1885, when the nearby Iron Hill Mine started mining gold and galena. The Seabury-Calkins, nicknamed "Seabury-Coffin," was another famous and productive mine in the area. The Seabury-Calkins miners accidentally dug into the Iron Hill Mine; however, during a mine fire, the Seabury-Calkins Mine became an inadvertent escape route. Other local mines—six altogether—also contributed to the growth of the town.

During this second boom, the town added a hotel (which opened on May 1, 1886), several stores, boarding houses capable of housing a hundred men, post office, church, bank, mill, and several low entertainment venues, including gambling halls and Fannie Hill's and Lottie Belmont's establishments. The town's second newspaper, The Nugget, was established in 1886. The largest hotel in Dakota Territory, William Hugginson's Black Hills Hotel, was three stories high and included a saloon and a banquet room. In August 1886, the first school session was held. A smelter was built in 1887 in Rubicon Gulch to the east. At some point, a cemetery was built. By 1891, Iron Hill Mine had turned a profit of $667,000. At its busiest, Carbonate is estimated to have had between 2,000 and 3,000 residents.

In 1888 and 1889, a diphtheria epidemic struck the area; the fumes from the smelter had killed every cat in the town and probably opened the door to respiratory diseases and illnesses spread by rats. Signs reading "Keep out: Black Diphtheria!" stayed in place until 1910.

Silver prices began to decline in 1891, causing all other mines besides Iron Hill to close by 1904. Soon, the town was largely abandoned. In 1900, the town's Hugginson Hotel was torn down for lumber to be used at the nearby Cleopatra Mill. In 1901, Iron Hill Mine was reworked and produced another 18,511 ounces (524,800 g) of silver and 91 metric tons (90 long tons; 100 short tons) of lead. In 1911, the mine was accidentally flooded and drove the owners out. Iron Hill continued operation until the 1930s, and today, only one house and headframe are the only remnants of the mine. Carbonate's last resident, an elderly man named Raspberry Brown, died in 1939.

== Geography ==
Carbonate is located in the Black Hills of west-central Lawrence County. The climate of Carbonate is the same as the rest of western South Dakota; it is hot in the summer and freezing in the winter. Carbonate is located approximately 4 miles (6.4 km) east of the ghost town of Maitland, near Squaw Creek, or 5 miles (8.0 km) north of Trojan, 10.5 miles (16.9 km) southeast of Spearfish, and 7 miles (11 km) northwest of Central City. While the houses were very scattered, the main site encircled an open valley. Only the buildings' foundations remain at the site.
