= Big Bottom =

Big Bottom may refer to:

- the Big Bottom massacre of the Northwest Indian War
- "Big Bottom," a song by Spinal Tap from the soundtrack This Is Spinal Tap
- Big Bottom, South Dakota, a ghost town in Meade County
