= Novak, South Dakota =

Novak, South Dakota Cindell Spur
- Ghost town
- Location in the U.S. state of South Dakota
- Coordinates: 44.2163745°N 103.5518578°W
- Country: United States
- State: South Dakota
- County: Lawrence
- Elevation: 4,898 ft (1,493 m)

Population (2000)
  - Total: 3
- Time zone: UTC-7 (Mountain (MST))
  - Summer (DST): UTC-6 (MDT)

Novak, also known as Cindell Spur, is a ghost town in Lawrence County, South Dakota, United States. It was an early mining camp.

== History ==
Novak was founded next to Greenwood, as the latter began to decline, in the early 1900s. Investors in the Safe Investment Mine and Mill settled in Novak. Safe Investment grew to have a bad reputation, as investors realized that they were actually losing money. In 1903 and 1904 the Novak mine began to develop. By 1906, they had paid off their debt. As the mining company grew, so did the town. In 1907 there were no saloons or dance houses. Gambling occasionally went on in the boarding house. The Black Hills & Fort Pierre Railroad built a branch to the town. There were three houses built by the mining company and several other cabins, and a school that served six students. Novak used the cemetery in Greenwood instead of building its own. A nearby creek was used for water.

The mine eventually ran its course and was no longer profitable. After the mining operations shut down, most of the residents left Novak. The school closed and the remaining children traveled to Benchmark for school. Until about the 1980s, Novak had two permanently occupied houses, but soon after that, the remaining residents either died or left, and Novak was officially abandoned. In 1974 the only remains of the town were two buildings and a large meadow.

== Geography ==
Novak is in the northern Black Hills in Lawrence County,. Founded on the bank of Boxelder Creek, it is located along what is today Nemo Road. It is 2.5 miles CONVERT away from Benchmark and three miles northwest of Nemo.

== See also ==
- Black Hills Gold Rush
- Nemo, South Dakota
