= Carbonate (disambiguation) =

Carbonate may refer to:

== Places ==
- Carbonate, Colorado, a ghost town in Garfield County, Colorado
- Carbonate, Lombardy, a comune in the Province of Como
- Carbonate, South Dakota, a ghost town in Lawrence County, South Dakota

== Science and technology ==
- Carbonate, a salt containing the carbonate anion, CO^{2−}_{3}
  - Carbonate minerals, a class of minerals containing the carbonate anion
  - Carbonate rocks
- Carbonate ester, an of carbonic acid, general structure R_{1}O(C=O)OR_{2}

== See also ==
Carbonation
