= Spokane (disambiguation) =

Spokane is a city in the state of Washington, United States.

Spokane may also refer to:

== Places ==
- Spokane River, a tributary of the Columbia River
- Spokane Valley, of the Spokane River
- Spokane, Louisiana
- Spokane, Missouri
- Spokane, South Dakota, ghost town
- Spokane County, Washington

== Other uses ==
- Spokane (film)
- Spokane (horse), winner of the 1889 Kentucky Derby
- Spokane people
- MV Spokane, a ferry operated Washington State Ferries
- Spokane Trophy, awarded by Commander United States Pacific Fleet
- USS Spokane (CL-120), a Juneau-class light cruiser
