= Charles E. Rushmore =

American businessman and philanthropist (1857–1931)

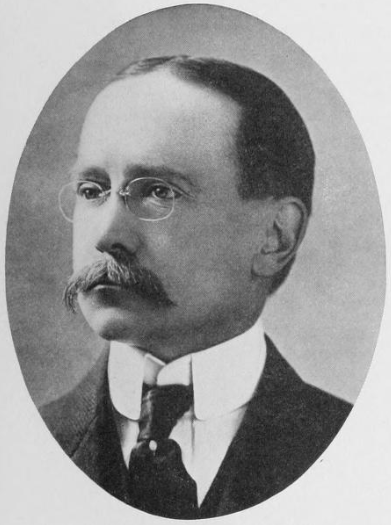
- Born: Charles Edward Rushmore; December 2, 1857; New York, New York, US
- Died: October 30, 1931 (aged 73); New York, New York, US
- Occupations: Businessman, lawyer
- Spouse: Jeanette E. Carpenter

Charles Edward Rushmore (December 2, 1857 – October 30, 1931) was an American businessman and attorney for whom Mount Rushmore is named.

== Biography ==
Born in New York City, he was the son of Edward Carman Rushmore and Mary Eliza (née Dunn) Rushmore, of Tuxedo Park, New York.

In 1885 Rushmore came to the Black Hills of South Dakota to check the titles to properties for an eastern mining company owned by James Wilson following the 1883 opening of the Etta tin mine. How Mount Rushmore came to be named after Charles is subject to contradictory recounting, (Note: One day he was returning to headquarters of the Harney Peak Consolidated Tin Co., Ltd., located at Pine Camp. With him was William W. Challis, a prospector and guide. As they neared the mountain, Rushmore turned to Challis and asked its name. Challis jestingly replied: "Never had any but it has now—we'll call the thing Rushmore.") (Note: According to rancher Jerry Urbanek, Rushmore returned to the Black Hills annually to hunt big game. One day, while accompanied by Ted Brockett of Keystone, South Dakota, Rushmore asked the name of the mountain and was told that it was Slaughterhouse Rock. Rushmore joked that his annual treks to the Hills had earned him the right to have the mountain named after himself. "So just for the hell of it," Urbanek claimed, the locals started calling the hill Mount Rushmore.) but the United States Board of Geographic Names officially recognized the name in June 1930, five years after Rushmore donated $5,000 (equivalent to $91,793 in 2025) towards Gutzon Borglum's sculpture. The memorial was dedicated by President Calvin Coolidge on August 10, 1927, though Rushmore was ill at the time and could not attend the event.

Rushmore was a member of the Phi Gamma Delta fraternity and a Freemason. He was married to Jeanette E. Carpenter.

He was a senior partner in the firm Rushmore, Bisbee, and Stern.

He died in New York City on October 30, 1931.
