= Nahant, South Dakota =

- Ghost town
- Location of Nahant in South Dakota
- Coordinates: 44.1766505°N 103.7554753°W
- Country: United States
- State: South Dakota
- County: Lawrence
- Founded: 1890
- Elevation: 5,682 ft (1,732 m)
- Time zone: UTC-7 (MST)
  - Summer (DST): UTC-6 (MDT)

Nahant or West Nahant (est. 1890) is a ghost town in Lawrence County, South Dakota, United States. It flourished as a logging and, to a lesser extent, mining town in the late 19th and early 20th centuries.

== History ==
Nahant was founded in 1890, making most of its profit from the nearby Montana Mine. In 1902, the Globe Mining Company began operations. The McLaughlin Tie and Timber Company later arrived in the area and began logging. Since Nahant was close by, in May 1906, the McLaughlin began funding it with a payroll of $47,000 per month. The same year, the McLaughlin built a ten-mile standard gauge railway line to Moskee, Wyoming. The Ray Company mined briefly in the area. In 1909, the McLaughlin added another railway line to Tinton and Cold Springs in South Dakota. These lines facilitated the growth of several small logging camps that were all connected by telephone to spring up. Nahant included two rows of houses, a boarding house, a post office, a two-room school, a well, a large water tank, a carpenter shop and a club house, which included activities such as basketball and roller-skating. This basketball team became known for once beating Deadwood's team. A nearby roundhouse held one of the engines on loan to the McLaughlin from CB&Q Railroad. Most of these buildings were built by the McLaughlin. In March 1909, 40 students attended the school. However, parents became displeased with the quality of their kids' education, and the school closed the following June. At its peak, Nahant had 500 residents. In 1911, a mining company from St. Louis considered reopening some abandoned operations in the area, but the idea was scrapped.

The McLaughlin Company became notorious for its failed operations. In April 1909, a fire completely destroyed the $40,000 McLaughlin Mill; the insurance only covered about half this amount. This fire was witnessed by people as far as Lead, which was 15 miles away. The lumber in the yards and the planing mill survived, but five railroad cars were destroyed, three of which contained a total of 975 wooden railroad ties. 90,000 board feet of lumber, a stripping shed containing thousands of ties, and six carloads of green logs were also lost. However, during the fire, none of the houses lost lighting. The McLaughlin never recovered from the financial losses and eventually closed due to low funds and poor management.

The town eventually died out, though the post office and hotel stayed in operation longer. The school building was relocated to a ranch near Brownsville. A single residence is the only remaining structure of the town.

== Geography ==
Nahant is located in the Black Hills of Lawrence County, at 44.1766505°N 103.7554753°W. It was on a hilltop near Montana City and Elkhorn.
