= Lancaster City, South Dakota =

Ghost town

Coordinates: 44°22′45″N 103°46′27″W

Lancaster City is a ghost town in Lawrence County, in the U.S. state of South Dakota.

== History ==
Lancaster City was named for Nimrod Lancaster, who laid out the mining community in 1877.

== See also ==
- List of ghost towns in South Dakota
