= Coal Springs, South Dakota =

Ghost town in South Dakota, U.S.

Coordinates: 45°26′30″N 102°06′28″W

Coal Springs is a ghost town in Perkins County, in the U.S. state of South Dakota. The GNIS classifies it as a populated place.

== History ==
Coal Springs was laid out in 1908, and named for the fact the community was located in a coal mining district. A post office called Coal Springs was established in 1909, and remained in operation until 1954.

The town and its history are commemorated annually at the Coal Springs Threshing Bee held in Meadow, South Dakota near the site of Coal Springs.

== See also ==
- List of ghost towns in South Dakota
