= Melvin, South Dakota =

Coordinates: 43°38′55″N 103°17′12″W

Melvin is a ghost town in Custer County, in the U.S. state of South Dakota.

== History ==
Melvin contained a post office from 1889 until 1890. The town was named for Melvin Perkins, the son of an early settler.

== See also ==
- List of ghost towns in South Dakota
