= Conata, South Dakota =

American ghost town

Conata
- Ghost town
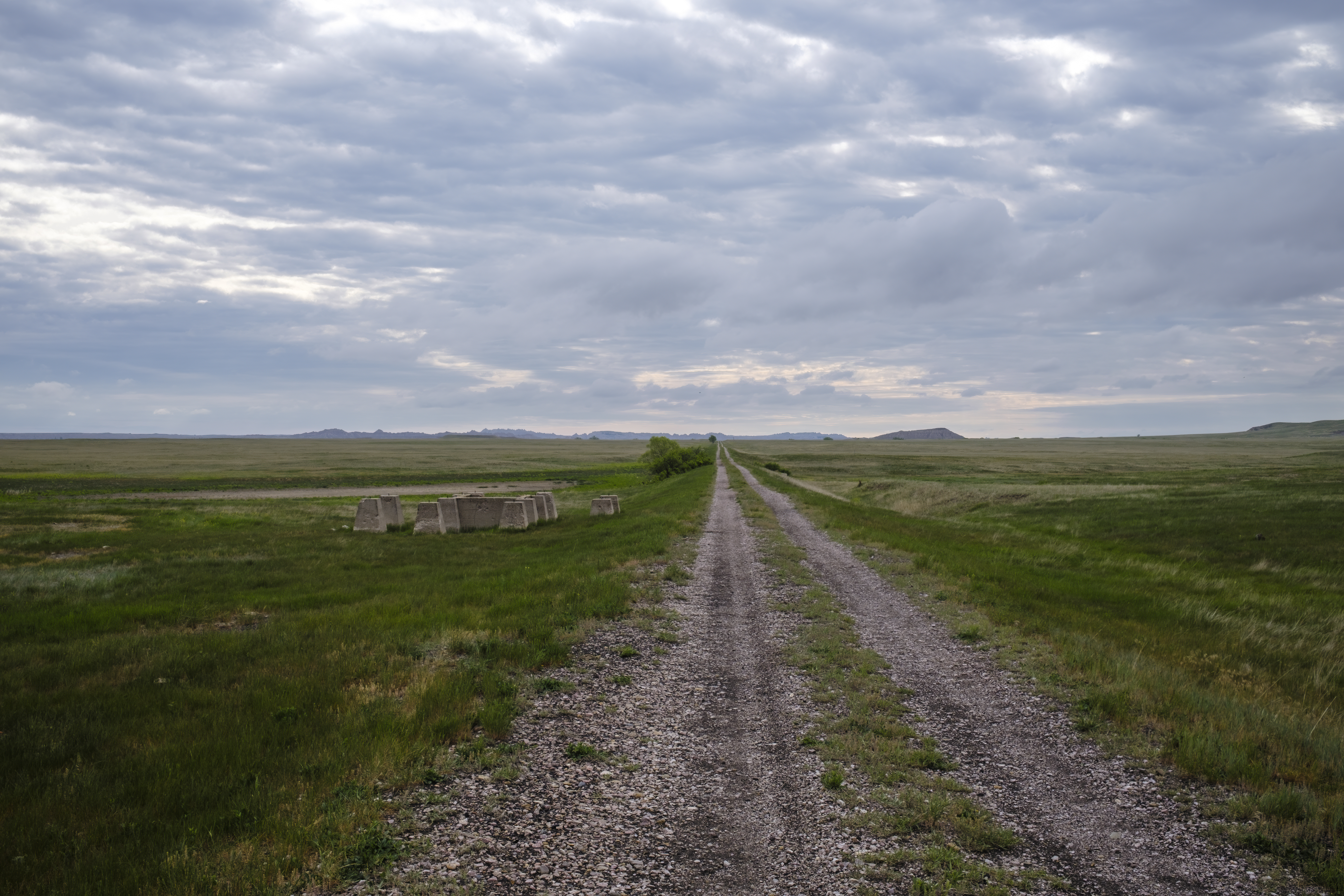

- Location in South Dakota Conata (the United States)
- Coordinates: 43°43′43″N 102°11′20″W
- Country: United States
- State: South Dakota
- County: Pennington
- Elevation: 2,477 ft (755 m)
- Time zone: UTC-6 ([MST])
  - Summer (DST): MST
- Area code: 605
- GNIS feature ID: 1261477

Conata is a ghost town in Pennington County, in the U.S. state of South Dakota. The GNIS classifies it as a populated place.

== History ==
Conata had its start in 1907 when the Milwaukee Railroad was extended to that point. A post office called Conata was established in 1908, and remained in operation until 1954.

The USGS Historical Map Explorer maps of 1950 and 1952 show the railroad line, Conata Rd and 14 structures.

A 1966 System Map of “The Milwaukee Road” does not identify Conata as a stop.

The tracks for the “Milwaukee Road” railroad have been removed East and West of Conata Basin Rd. All but one section of track still lies under the dirt road. The ends of the rails are visible on either side of the road. (See photos)

Google Maps shows outlines of the town boundaries and lots.

== Gallery ==
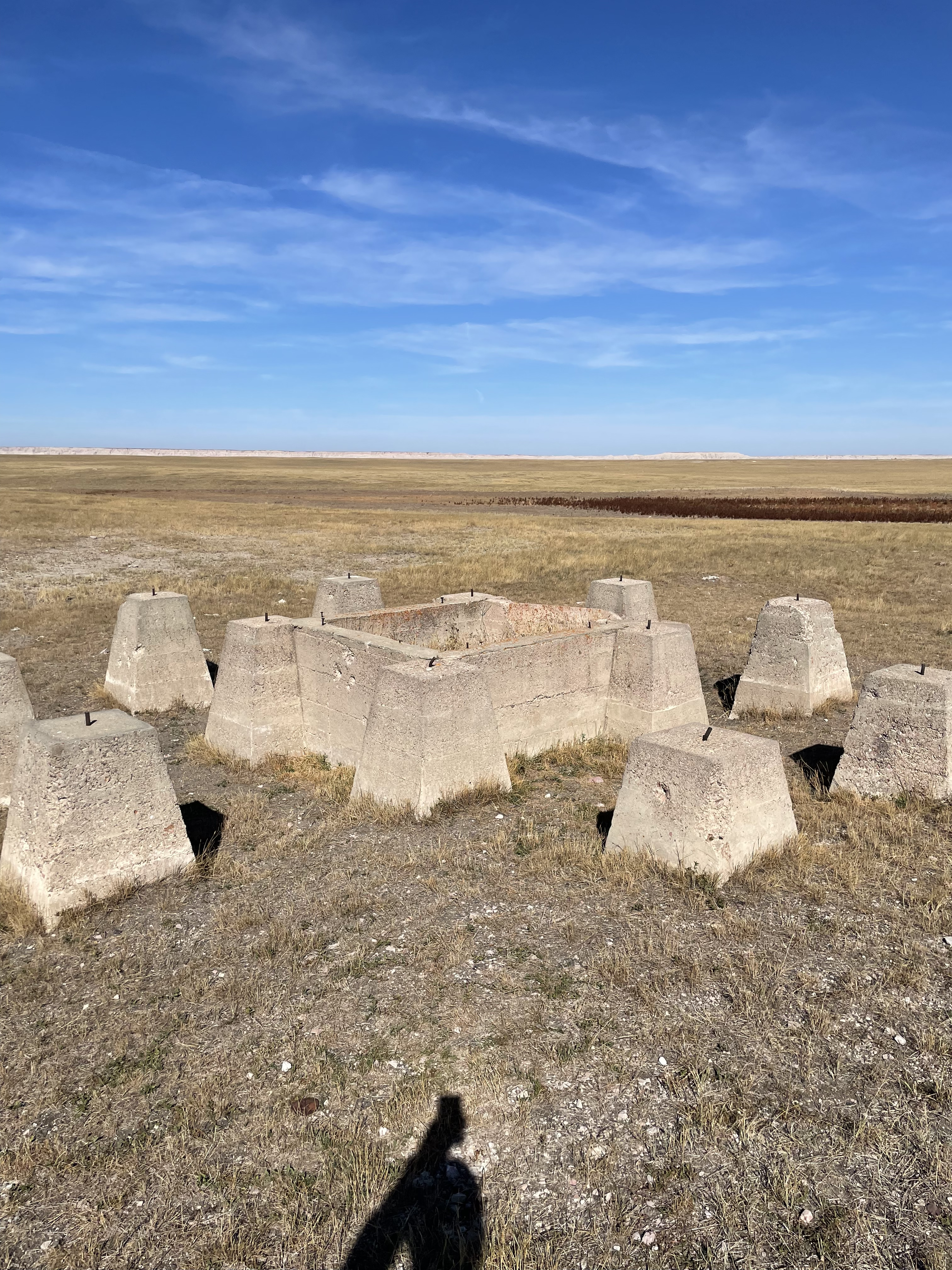
Conata Water Tower footings

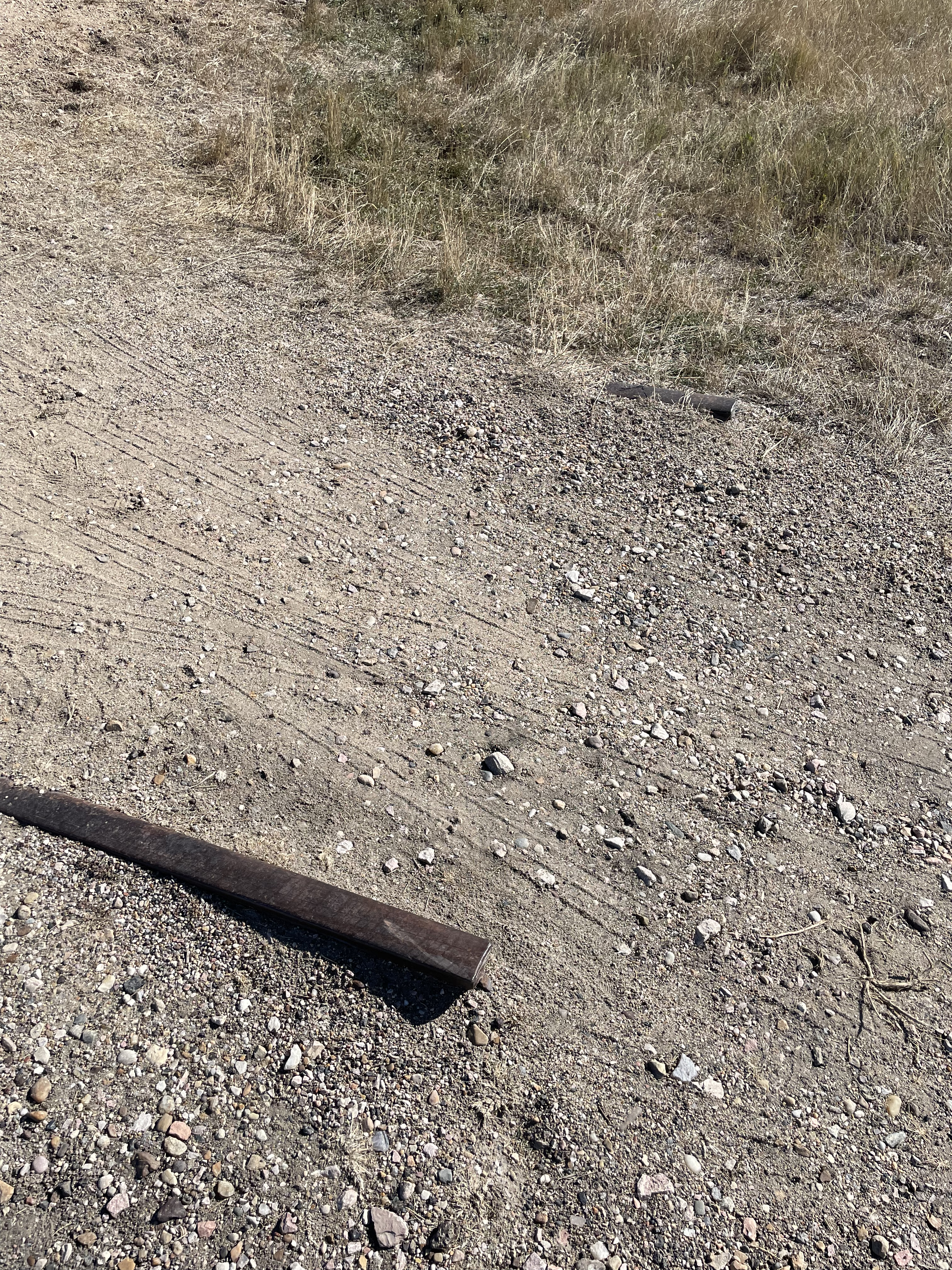
Remaining rail section

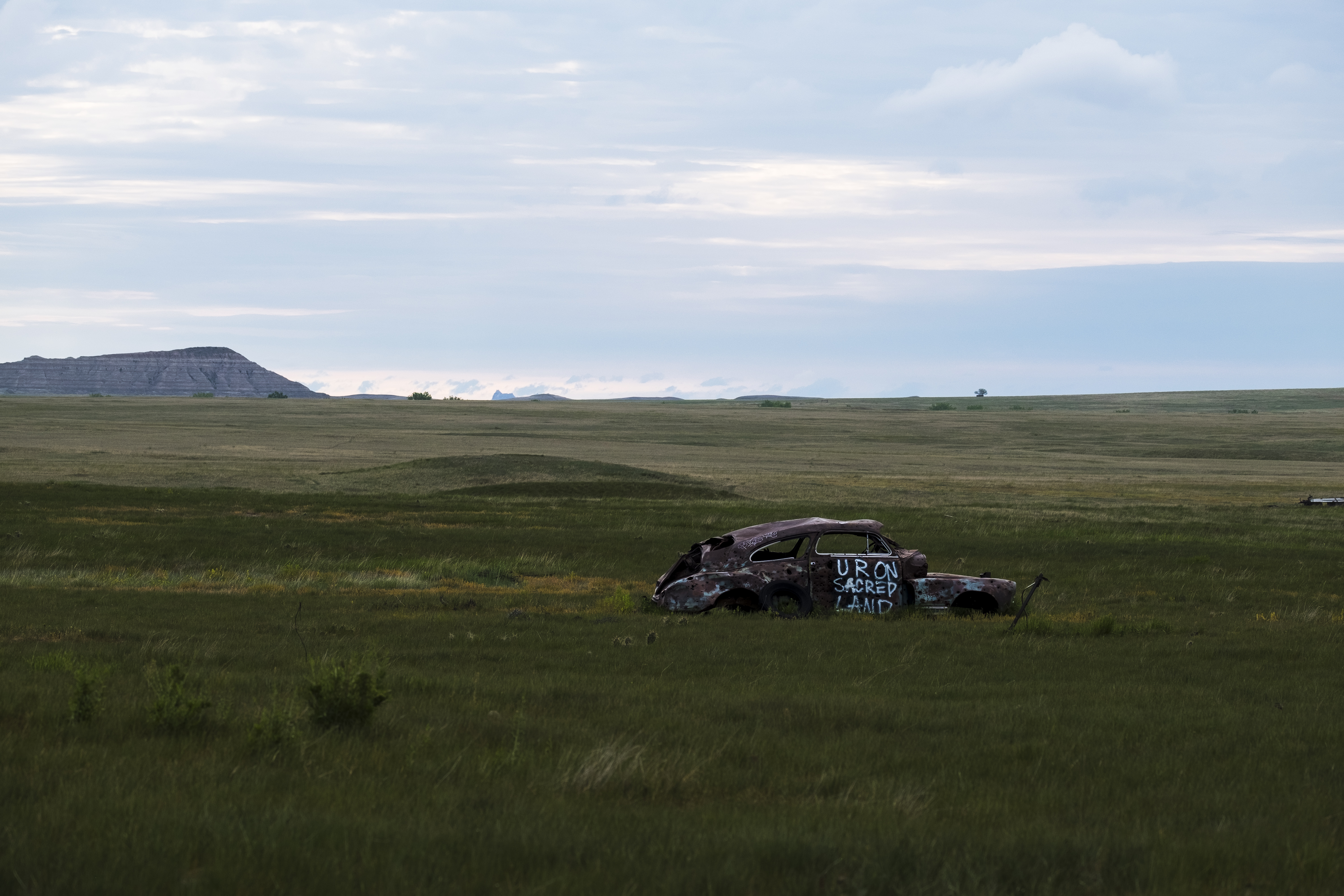
Abandoned vehicle with the message "UR ON SACRED LAND."

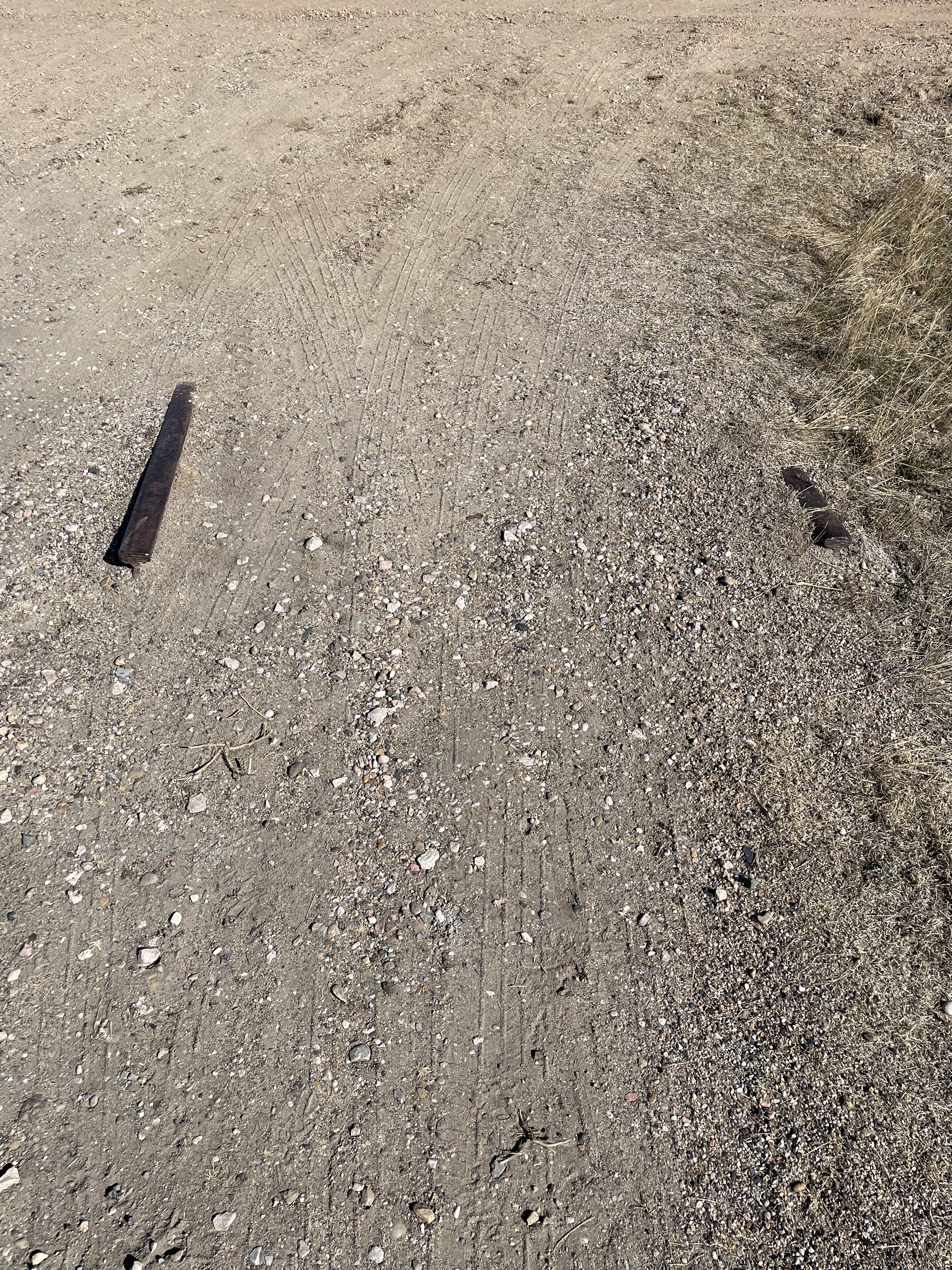
Remaining rail section
