= Okobojo, South Dakota =

Ghost town in Sully County, South Dakota, United States

Coordinates: 44°38′57″N 100°23′44″W

Okobojo (Dakota: okówožu; "to plant in spaces") is a ghost town in Sully County, South Dakota, United States.

== History ==
The first settler in the area was Peter Brennan, who arrived in early 1882. His presence was technically illegal, since the federal government did not begin opening land in the township until April 9, 1883. The town was laid out that spring. Most of the first settlers were industrial people from Iowa, Ohio, Illinois, and Indiana. Many of them did not plan to make a permanent settlement. The first building was a general store. The town also included a hardware store, several other stores, a hotel, a slaughterhouse, a printing office, a cemetery, and a town hall. By October, there were about 250 buildings in the surrounding area. The township was first called Pymosa, but it was later changed to Okobojo. The first school was built on the west side of the township in November 1883. The first newspaper emerged in May 1884 and ran until 1929, after it was moved to nearby Onida. That fall, a flouring mill was built; it closed later due to the high cost of fuel needed to run it. Military personnel from Fort Sully often visited the town. For the first few years, the township's crops did well, but by 1886, severe weather conditions began to damage them. By 1890, crops were doing poorly, and much of the area was abandoned.

== Geography ==
Okobojo is located in Sully County, South Dakota, east of the Missouri River.

== See also ==
- List of ghost towns in South Dakota
