= Grand View, South Dakota =

Abandoned townsite

Grand View Grandview
- Ghost town
- Location in the state of South Dakota
- Coordinates (Historical marker): 43.384233°N 98.355167°W
- Country: United States of America
- State: South Dakota
- County: Douglas County

Grand View, also labeled as Grandview, was a town and former county seat of Douglas County, South Dakota.

Grand View was located in the southern half of Section 13 of Grandview Township and part of the northern half of Section 24. A historical marker along west of the intersection of 392nd Avenue and 276th Street displays a town map and history. Like many early settlements in the West, it was abandoned as residents moved to towns closer to the railroad, like future county seat Armour.

== History ==
Grand View was platted on August 21, 1882, by Kingsley G. Foster, Joe Devy and Rufus D. Prescott. The former two owned a store on the eastern side of town which served as the county courthouse. It narrowly beat Huston and Douglas City, both long since abandoned. Douglas County had a turbulent history, with its first county seat a paper town named Brownsdale, which was created by a con artist named Walter H. Brown. The scandal had been uncovered by county resident and future South Dakota Attorney General Robert Dollard. Governor Nehemiah Ordway, who had been involved in the Brownsdale scandal, supported Huston as the county seat. Dollard allegedly provided beer to county residents to support Grand View as the new county seat.

Grand View was named for the view of the surrounding areas from the hill it sat on. The town was divided into two halves, with the part in a hollow on the southern half called Lower Grand View. A rivalry formed between the two sides of town. By 1885, the town had about 600 residents.

Grand View was served by a post office, a church, and the Douglas County Chronicle, initially Democratic leaning. It had a mail route from Oak Hollow to the southeast, after Douglas City faded away. The Chronicle would cease publishing in Grand View on July 15, 1886, and began publishing in Armour a week later. It would later merge with the Republican-leaning South Dakota Tribune in 1893 to become the Armour Chronicle Tribune.

In 1892, a tornado hit the town center, destroying a store owned by an Alfred W. Thomas. Thomas was swept from his second floor residence and was injured by landing on a board with a nail on Main Street.

Grand View lost prominence and population as Armour was chosen as the then terminus for the railroad in 1886. It continued as the county seat until in 1894. The recession at the time stifled hopes that the railroad would be extended to Grand View. It would later be completely bypassed by the railroad which would run through the future town of Corsica.

Several elections were held on the future of Grand View. In 1889, it won over Armour to continue to be the county seat by a vote of 620 to 483. In 1894, Armour won in a rematch by 671 to 225 on a promise of building a better county courthouse.

The first post office in Armour was brought from Grand View, as were a number of other buildings. By 1909, only a few buildings remained in the former town, including a church and a school.
