= Moon, South Dakota =

Coordinates: 43°56′47″N 104°00′30″W

Moon is a ghost town in Pennington County, in the U.S. state of South Dakota. The GNIS classifies it as a populated place.

== History ==
Moon was laid out by T. J. Sherwood in 1910, and named in honor of Jack Moon, its first inhabitant. A post office called Moon was established in 1911 and remained in operation until 1953.

== See also ==
- List of ghost towns in South Dakota
