= Addie Camp, South Dakota =

Ghost town in South Dakota, United States

Addie Camp Canadaville, Addie Spur
- Ghost town
- Kennedyville
- Location of Addie Camp in South Dakota.
- Coordinates: 43°55′23″N 103°31′27″W
- Country: United States of America
- State: South Dakota
- County: Pennington County
- Settled: c. 1892
- Abandoned: c. 1917
- Named for: the nearby Addie Mine; saloon and boarding house owner Tom Kennedy
- Elevation: 4,892 ft (1,491 m)
- Time zone: UTC-7 (MST)
  - Summer (DST): UTC-6 (MDT)

Addie Camp, also known as Kennedyville, Addie Spur, or Canadaville, (Note: "Canadaville" appears only on USGS maps. There is no evidence that the settlement was ever known as such.) is a ghost town located in Pennington County, South Dakota, United States. It was a mining camp in the Black Hills that was active from the early 1880s until the 1910s.

== Naming ==
Addie Camp was named by the miners of the nearby Addie Mine. The later name "Kennedyville" came from the owner of the boarding house and saloon, Tom Kennedy. "Canadaville" is probably a corruption of "Kennedyville."

== History ==
Addie Camp was settled by the miners of the nearby Addie Mine, which was run under the England-based Harney Peak Tin Mining, Milling, and Manufacturing Company. The company mainly produced cassiterite from the Keystone-Hill City area. Another mine in the town, The Good Luck Mine, mined tungsten. In December 1892, the Grand Island & Wyoming Central Railroad built a line running from the town to the tin mill east of Hill City. The mine never became successful, despite shaft and drift mining down to 800 feet. On February 25, 1900, the railroad extended to Keystone, causing the town to grow again. The town included a boarding house, saloon, platform station, and commissary car for railroaders. The town declined when, in June 1917, the railroad leading into the town was removed. This turned Addie Camp into a small farming community; however, some tungsten mining resumed during World Wars I and II.

== Geography ==
The former site of the town is in Pennington County and is located 2.7 miles (4.3 km) east of Hill City. County Road 323 runs past the site. The elevation is 4,892 feet (1,491 m) above sea level.

There are only a few ruined houses remaining, which are located on the north side of the former railroad tracks and along an old gravel road.
