= Mason, South Dakota =

Ghost town in South Dakota, United States

Coordinates: 44°48′53.48″N 103°49′8.67″W

Mason is a ghost town in Butte County, in the U.S. state of South Dakota.

== History ==
Mason was laid out in 1912, and named in honor of a local family. A post office called Mason was established in 1912, and remained in operation until 1940.

== See also ==
- List of ghost towns in South Dakota
