= Heppner, South Dakota =

Coordinates: 43°14′49″N 103°33′00″W

Heppner is an extinct town in Fall River County, in the U.S. state of South Dakota. The GNIS classifies it as a populated place.

== History ==
Heppner was laid out in 1914, and named in honor of Charles Heppner, who was instrumental in securing the post office for the town. A post office was established at Heppner in 1914, and remained in operation until 1952.

== See also ==
- List of ghost towns in South Dakota
