= Maitland, South Dakota =

Maitland, South Dakota Garden City
- Ghost town
- Location of Maitland in South Dakota.
- Coordinates: 44.3974841°N 103.8015891°W
- Country: United States
- State: South Dakota
- County: Lawrence
- Named for: Alexander Maitland
- Elevation: 4,898 ft (1,493 m)
- Time zone: UTC-7 (MST)
  - Summer (DST): UTC-6 (MDT)

Maitland, originally called Garden City and sometimes misspelled Midland, is a ghost town in Lawrence County, South Dakota, United States. It was a mining community that boomed during the Black Hills Gold Rush, but was abandoned by about 1915.

Today many parts of the area are residential and include Maitland Ridge and Paradise Acres.

== Naming ==
The town was called Garden City from 1877 to 1902, at which point it was renamed for Alexander Maitland, a former Lieutenant Governor of Michigan, who took over the local Penobscot Mine. The mine was also renamed Maitland Mine. The mine and town are sometimes misspelled "Midland."

== History ==
=== Founding and mining operations ===
Maitland, originally called Garden City, started out as a small gold mining settlement during the 1870s, forming during the Black Hills Gold Rush. The Rainy Day (abandoned after 1880), Beltram, Gold Eagle, Echo, Deadbroke, Columbus, and Penobscot (later Maitland) Mines surrounded the town. These mines were later worked by the Garden City Mining Company. In February 1877, property owners from the area held a meeting to organize the town. Garden City and the neighboring camp of New Chicago, located just to the north, consolidated and reorganized; the two towns then merged as Garden City.

The mined ore was roasted, or converted into an oxide, in a kiln, and then run through a chlorination process before it could be extracted. From 1882 to 1889, Garden City had several chlorination plants and formed the Garden City Chlorination Works, causing a brief period of boom. Later, the ore was treated using the cyanide process. The ore produced from the mines and mill sold for $30 per ton. However, the gold ore was not pure; it also contained trace amounts of copper, arsenic, silver, bismuth, and antimony. In 1890, a forest fire threatened Garden City, and the mine's explosives were briefly evacuated.

=== The Maitland Period ===
Garden City was a lively place, holding many dances in its heyday. A railroad line to Garden City was briefly considered but was never built. During the town's boom years, it had about 50 houses and stores, including a post office, livery barn, office building, boarding house, community hall known as the Maitland Club, school, two-story saloon, blacksmith shop, and machine shop. In 1902, Alexander Maitland formed the Penobscot Mining Company, and Garden City was renamed to Maitland. The town's buildings and the mines' equipment were restored and repaired. A telephone line was added in May 1902, and a newspaper was rumored. The Penobscot Mining Company initially employed twelve men, but by the summer of 1902, the number of employees had risen to 125. A 40-ton stamp mill was added in January 1903, two months later than it had been expected to be finished. The company made $400,000 in gold production in 17 months. The company was known as the Penobscot Mining Company from 1904 to 1906, but later changed its name and operated as the North Homestake Mining Company from 1907 to 1911.

=== Abandonment and later history ===
Maitland had several rich strikes and slow years. By 1915, the town was already largely abandoned; only the mill, a shaft house, and a handful of houses remained. Until that year, the Maitland Mine had had several different managers. By World War I, most of the mines and towns in the area had been abandoned mainly due to the war, complete exhaustion of ores, and financial hardship. In 1934, the Maitland Mine was reopened, and from 1935 to 1936, the Canyon Corporation operated the mine. For these purposes, the boarding house was restored and became a home for 20 men. 85 other workers commuted from neighboring towns. The mill was also restored and electricity was added. When World War II reached the United States in 1941, the mine was closed and has since been inactive. The mill burned down while it was being demolished in the 1950s. In the 1970s, the Maitland Slopes Company, a snowmobiling and tobogganing company was in operation near the area. Most of Maitland's site is now owned by the Homestake Mining Company, and the area has become a timber farm. The only remnants of the town are Alexander Maitland's house, the livery barn, and the office building.

== Geography ==
Maitland was located in the Black Hills of central Lawrence County. It was on False Bottom Creek, approximately 2.5 miles (4.0 km) northwest of Central City and southwest of Spearfish.

== Notable person ==
- Alexander Maitland, former Lieutenant Governor of Michigan
