= Pedro, South Dakota =

Pedro
- Ghost town
- Location within South Dakota
- Coordinates: 44.42°N 102.119°W
- Country: United States
- State: South Dakota
- County: Pennington
- Elevation: 2,031 ft (619 m)
- Time zone: UTC-7 (MST)

Pedro is a populated place in Pennington County, South Dakota, United States. Pedro once had a population of 300 and had its own newspaper, the Pedro Bugle, but is now a ghost town.

== History ==
The community's name was selected during a session of the card game Pedro.

Carrie Ingalls (Little House on the Prairie) worked for E.L. Senn (who owned as many as fifty-one newspapers in South Dakota at that time) in Pedro, which was not too far from her claim. By the summer of 1909, she was the manager working for Senn at the Pedro Bugle
