= Teddy Bear, South Dakota =

Teddy Bear
- Ghost town
- Location in South Dakota
- Coordinates: 43°57′05″N 103°30′22″W
- Country: United States
- State: South Dakota
- County: Pennington
- Elevation: 4,770 ft (1,450 m)
- Time zone: UTC-7 (Mountain (MST))
  - Summer (DST): UTC-6 (MDT)
- GNIS feature ID: 1264576

Teddy Bear is a ghost town in Pennington County, South Dakota, United States. The settlement was located 3.5 mi (5.6 km) east of Hill City.

Many details of the history of Teddy Bear—including its name—are uncertain. It was never a large town and likely only ever operated as a mining camp with a few buildings. Based on the remains of its architecture, it likely existed before 1900. As of 2006, ruins are still standing, including the remains of basements, an unusual feature in Black Hills architecture.
