= East Sioux Falls, South Dakota =

Coordinates: 43°31′39″N 96°39′07″W

East Sioux Falls was a city located in southeastern Minnehaha County, South Dakota, United States, located about 6 miles (9.7 km) east of Sioux Falls along South Dakota Highway 42 on the Big Sioux River.

== History ==
During the 1880s, the quarrying of a distinctive pink stone known as jasper or quartzite had developed into a successful business in Sioux Falls. In 1887, the Sioux Falls Granite Company opened four quarries six miles due east of downtown Sioux Falls in Split Rock Township.

This area had an abundance of quartzite along the bluffs overlooking the Big Sioux River and exposure to the Earth's surface ensured that the stone could be easily mined. Hundreds of workers and their families settled in a nearby community known at the time as Ives.

In 1888, Sioux Falls officials convinced the Illinois Central Railroad to extend the tracks west from Iowa and through the city.

Influenced by the mining, the rail line was routed past the Split Rock quarries, opening markets for the stone in metropolitan cities such as Chicago.

Railroad officials named the depot East Sioux Falls, replacing Ives in the historical records. By 1890, the community had grown to over 600 residents which led to the incorporation of East Sioux Falls as a municipality.

Numerous structures were built in East Sioux Falls including worker's cottages, post office, town hall, depot, school house, general store, hotel, grain elevator, stable, saloons and jail. The remains of several buildings are still visible within the nature area.

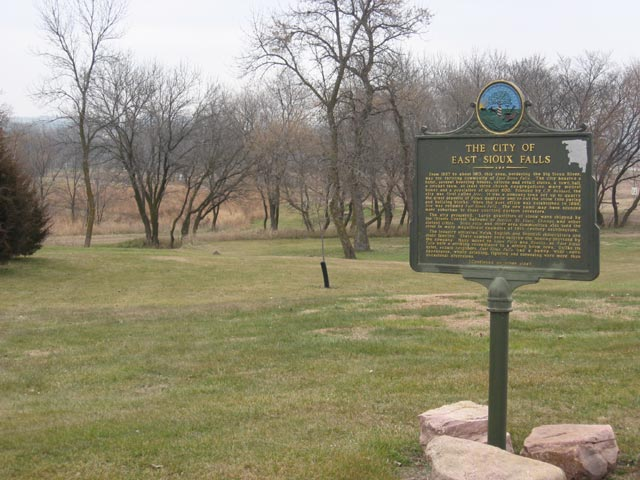
Sign marking the site of the former town.

The quarried stone was cut into building stones and paving blocks and shipped to construction projects throughout the country. The pink quartzite was superior in quality to other stones and possessed a coloring which was extremely delicate and pleasing to the eye. The stone was used in the construction of several Sioux Falls buildings including the Old Courthouse Museum, old post office (now the Federal Courthouse), Carnegie Public Library, and Pettigrew Home & Museum. Historical records show that hundreds of miles of roads in the larger cities of the west were paved with quartzite blocks cut at the East Sioux Falls quarries.

The city felt the impact of a slowing economy in 1891 and economic problems mounted with the depression of 1893. The tough economic times of the 1890s pushed the Sioux Falls Granite Company into bankruptcy and the property was acquired by George H. Perry who operated the East Sioux Falls Quarry Company for a time. By the turn of the century, concrete had taken the place of stone as a building material. These events contributed to the out migration of residents from East Sioux Falls and forced the city to give up its charter in 1913. People continued to reside in the community until the last few structures were demolished in the late 1980s.

== See also ==
- List of ghost towns in South Dakota
