= Flatiron, South Dakota =

Flatiron, South Dakota Yellow Creek
- Ghost town
- Location of Flatiron in South Dakota.
- Coordinates: 44.3263733°N 103.7685318°W
- Country: United States
- State: South Dakota
- County: Lawrence County
- Elevation: 5,436 ft (1,657 m)
- Time zone: UTC-7 (MST)
  - Summer (DST): UTC-6 (MDT)

Flatiron, formerly known as Yellow Creek or Flat Iron City, is a ghost town in Lawrence County, South Dakota, United States. It was known for its highly successful gold mining.

== History ==
=== Beginnings and mining operations ===
As people began to move into the Black Hills, several cabins sprang up around Yellow Creek in the Black Hills. In 1894, the town began to be staked out, but was not yet fully founded; when the area boomed around May 1896, a series of large buildings and small cabins, including a two-story boarding house, were built. Flatiron was first advertised on a billboard as Flat Iron City. Freshwater springs were located nearby, and a well was dug. Eventually, it became known as Yellow Creek, and then again as Flatiron.

The Chicago, Burlington & Quincy Railroad ran through Flatiron, and the town was home to the Wasp No. 2 Mine, which was founded in the 1890s. This open-pit mine was known for its gold. The first few attempts to mine the area were slow until a new general manager, John Gray, took over direction. The mine was then able to employ the use of explosives to extend the mine and break up the ore. Usually, 5,000 to 6,000 tons of ore were broken up at a time using about 1,000 pounds (450 kg) of powder. The ore was very low-grade, but was found in large deposits. The ore was hauled from the site using the company railroad and was pushed through the cyanide mill using gravity. The gold ore sold for US$1.6 a ton, which was a huge accomplishment at the time. The Little Blue Mine to the north became just as successful for producing gold and flux. The main railroad was eventually extended to the mill; however, the grade was so steep that the cars had to be hauled up by a winch. Two separate railroad lines ran through the town. One began and ended in the town, while the other lead into the town. The finely-ground tailings were used as fill and ballast in the form of sand.

=== Growth and abandonment ===
The town prospered because of the mine. Shortly after its founding, it had one dozen homes. By 1915, it had about 30 buildings, including a school, several large mills, many stores, and a post office. The tailings covered one side of a nearby large valley. On September 1, 1928 (Daily Pioneer Times September 15, 1928) a powerful flood resulting from heavy rain caused this accumulated tailings to slump. The railroad, train, and engine were buried under several feet of sand, killing the fireman, Maurice Cooper, in the process. The tracks were not uncovered until around 1974, when Lead and Deadwood, two neighboring towns, began to use the tailings to sand icy roads during winter. The mines eventually shut down and the town was completely abandoned. More than 80% of the town has sunk into the caving tunnels below, and the rest are only foundations.

== Geography ==
Flatiron is located in the Black Hills of east-central Lawrence County. It is approximately two miles (3.2 km) south of Lead. The town itself is built on the side of a hill and near a large valley. To the north is the abandoned Little Blue Mine.
