= Bloomington, South Dakota =

Human settlement in South Dakota, United States of America

Bloomington is a ghost town in Clay County, South Dakota, United States. It was destroyed by a group of outlaws in 1877.

== History ==
Bloomington was founded near a small creek 5 miles north of Vermillion. It was immediately abandoned when outlaws destroyed it in 1877.
