= Tinton, South Dakota =

Ghost town in South Dakota

- Ghost town
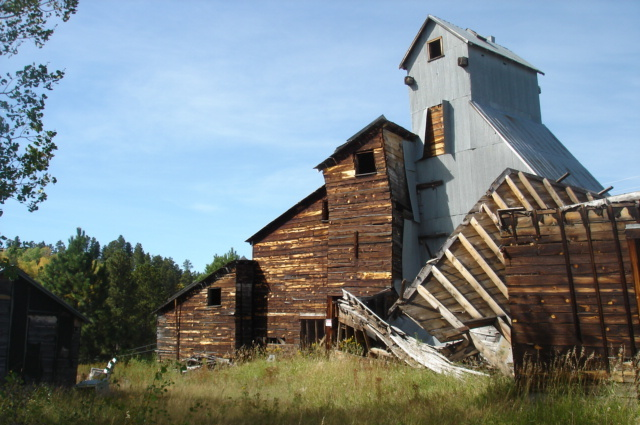
- Shaft house near Tinton

- Location within South Dakota Location within the United States
- Coordinates: 44.3805398°N 104.0485446°W
- Country: United States
- State: South Dakota
- County: Lawrence
- Founded: late 1800s
- Abandoned: 1950s
- Elevation: 5,961 ft (1,817 m)

Population (2013)
  - Total: 0
- Time zone: UTC-7 (MST)
  - Summer (DST): UTC-6 (MDT)
- Dakota Tin and Gold Mine
- U.S. National Register of Historic Places
- U.S. Historic district
- Area: 5 acres (2.0 ha)
- Architectural style: Vernacular/Craftsman
- NRHP reference No.: 05000592
- Added to NRHP: June 8, 2005

Tinton is a ghost town in the Black Hills of Lawrence County, South Dakota, United States. Founded in 1876, it started out as a gold mining camp and later began to produce tin. It had a heavy decline in the early 20th century due to the decline in the mining industry, and the town was fully abandoned by the 1950s. Beginning in 1937, it was home to the Dakota Tin and Gold Mine, which was listed on the National Register of Historic Places in 2005.

== History ==
=== Establishment ===
The area was first settled in 1876 by Edgar St. John, who lived in the town until his death in 1928. That same year, tin was discovered in the area in placer deposits. In 1879, large gold deposits were found in Negro Hill, just south of the present-day town site. This discovery caused the first boom of the area. In 1884, tin was discovered within pegmatite rock, furthering the development of the area and converting the operation from gold to tin.

A mining company known as the Tinton Company had established Tinton as a company town by 1904. Over several years, other companies took ownership of the town, including The American Tin Plate Company, The Boston Tin Company, The Black Hills Tin Mining Company, and The Tinton Reduction Company. The mining facilities ran right up against the town. The town had a post office, bank, mill, two-room schoolhouse, hotel, Black Hills Tin Company store and office, assembly hall, blacksmith, grocery, weekly newspaper, and six houses for miners and their families. At least 14 more houses were added over the years. It was once proposed that a railroad be built to the town from Iron Creek in Spearfish Canyon, but this was never accomplished. 104,987 pounds (47,621 kg) of tin had been mined from the Rough and Ready Mine alone by 1911. Other mining operations in the area were also very successful.

=== Dakota Tin and Gold Company ===
In 1934, W.O. Fillmore purchased 334-acre (135 ha) claim on Potato Creek near Tinton and founded his Dakota Tin and Gold Company in 1937. He immediately constructed several buildings, including a new shaft house south of the existing mine at Tinton, an assayer's office, several cabins, sheds, and two dams. Restrictions imposed on mining for World War II shut down the mine in 1942, and it did not reopen after the war. 5 acres (2.0 ha) of the Dakota Tin and Gold Mine's principal site near Tinton were listed on the National Register of Historic Places in 2005.

=== Decline and abandonment ===
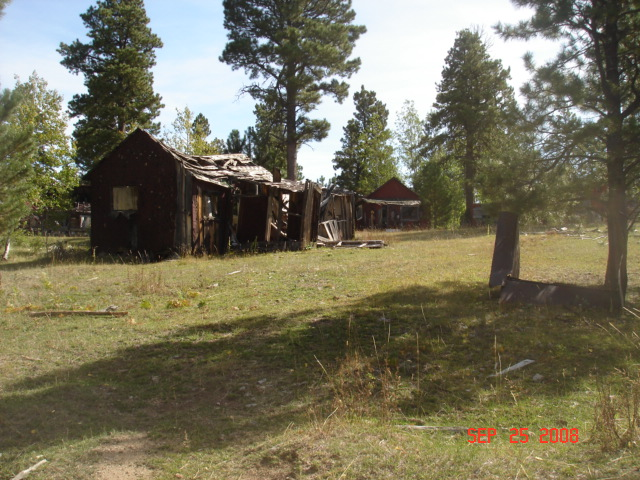
Abandoned buildings in Tinton

Mine production began to decline in the 1910s but continued sporadically until the 1950s. In the 1930s, a sawmill was built due to the declining success of the town's mining operations. The mine briefly resumed operations during World War II and began producing feldspar, lithium, and more tin. However, the mines were operating at a loss and shut down again within the decade.

The town was abandoned after a fire destroyed the mill in the 1950s. Today, the town is managed by the mining company Tinton Enterprises. The mines are now back in operation, providing tantalum.

== Geography ==
Tinton is located at the back of Spearfish Canyon in the Black Hills of Lawrence County, South Dakota, and Crook County, Wyoming. Main Street ran down the Wyoming-South Dakota border, but the town is most widely accepted to be inside the latter. It is approximately 6 miles (9.7 km) west of Iron Creek. Tinton is positioned on a hill and overlooks the valleys to the east and west, which are full of mines. Modern access is via National Forest Road 222. Several other ghost towns, including Mineral and Welcome, Wyoming, are located nearby.

While many structures are still standing, several have collapsed, and there is no glass in the windows. The modern mining operation replaced the Wyoming-side structures with new buildings; historically, the Wyoming side of town included the hotel, school, post office, and blacksmith. These were all destroyed in 1996. The South Dakota side, while mostly left untouched by demolition,
