= Ragged Top, South Dakota =

Ragged Top, South Dakota Balmoral
- Unincorporated community
- Location within South Dakota Location within the United States
- Coordinates: 44°21′35″N 103°53′09″W
- Country: United States
- State: South Dakota
- County: Lawrence
- Elevation: 5,873 ft (1,790 m)
- Time zone: UTC-7 (MST)
  - Summer (DST): UTC-6 (MDT)
- GNIS feature ID: 1900655

Ragged Top (also Balmoral) is a ghost town in Lawrence County, South Dakota, United States. While the town was once a prosperous mining town, it declined due to miners' inability to transport their ore to smelters.

== History ==
Ragged Top was started as a gold mining town in the 1880s and was originally called Balmoral after a local mine. The name was later renamed for the hill, Ragged Top Mountain, on which it was located. Ragged Top also referred to the mining district which also encompassed the nearby towns (all now abandoned) of Preston, Cyanide, Dacy, and Balmoral. The population of the area was estimated to be around 300 to 400 in the early 1880s, but this estimate is most likely too low. Some of the mining companies in the area were the Dacy, Deadwood Standard, Eva H. & Silver Tongue, Eagle Bird, American Mining Company, Ulster, Old Ironsides, Victoria, Metallic Streak, and Spearfish Gold Mining and Milling Company. The last one produced 48,618 ounces (1,378,300 g) of gold between 1899 and 1906. The mines were not very well explored before 1896, and all had ceased operation by around 1915. The town itself was soon abandoned due to the extreme difficulty of transporting the ore to the smelters.

== Geography ==
Ragged Top was located in the Black Hills of central Lawrence County, on Ragged Top Mountain and above Spearfish Valley. It is south of Spearfish and west of Lead.

== See also ==
- List of ghost towns in South Dakota
