= Greenwood, Lawrence County, South Dakota =

Greenwood, South Dakota Laflin čha-phežŋ
- Ghost town
- Location of Greenwood in South Dakota
- Coordinates: 44.2202633°N 103.5615803°W
- Country: United States
- State: South Dakota
- County: Lawrence
- Founded: c. 1885
- Elevation: 4,941 ft (1,506 m)
- Time zone: UTC-7 (MST)
  - Summer (DST): UTC-6 (MDT)

Greenwood (Dakota: čha-phežŋ; "wood [of] grass"), also known as Laflin, (c. 1885-after 1912), is a ghost town in Lawrence County, South Dakota, United States. According to the book “Deadwood Saints and Sinners” by Jerry L. Bryant and Barbara Fifer, Robert Flormann died of pneumonia in Nome, Alaska, on July 4, 1900 and is buried in Seattle, page 168.

== History ==
Greenwood was founded circa 1885 and was known for its mine. The town took its name from the green trees in the area. It included a store, school, stage barn, smithy, post office, livery stable, and boarding house. The mine was known for its gold production, though apparently, the mine turned no profit and only covered the cost of operations. Robert Flormann helped to promote the mine and became very wealthy. In 1912, the mine caught fire, and Flormann fell to his death while trying to rescue a survivor. In 1971, the last standing house in Greenwood was torn down. The foundations and the mine are all that remain.

== Geography ==
Greenwood is located in the Black Hills in Lawrence County, South Dakota, United States at the coordinates 44.2202633°N 103.5615803°W. It is southwest of Boxelder Creek and the Black Hills & Fort Pierre Railroad.
