= Big Bottom, South Dakota =

- Ghost town
- Location of Big Bottom in South Dakota.
- Coordinates: 44°35′08″N 103°31′22″W
- Country: United States of America
- State: South Dakota
- County: Meade
- Founded: 1878
- Abandoned: c. 1887
- Founder: Thomas D. Pryor
- Elevation: 2,995 ft (913 m)
- Time zone: UTC-7 (MST)
  - Summer (DST): UTC-6 (MDT)

Big Bottom (1878–1887) is a ghost town in Meade County. When it was listed as a town, 1876-abt 1900, it was located about 9 miles north of the town of Whitewood. It was in the large flat plain area just west of the present day border of Meade & Lawrence Counties, at the upper end of the Whitewood Valley, where Whitewood Creek turns west toward the Cheyenne River. When the town began abt. 1876, that area was part of Lawrence County. South Dakota, United States.

== History ==
Big Bottom was founded in 1878 by Thomas D. Pryor. He built a two-story frame house for himself and added a dance hall and saloon, both of which became very well known to the locals. In 1880, a post office was established, and a school soon followed. However, the anticipated railroad bypassed the town, and in 1887, the store and saloon closed their doors. This Big Bottom area was in Lawrence county at the time. That locale became part of Meade county when it was created in 1889. Today, the town is completely abandoned, and little remains.

== Geography ==
Big Bottom is located on the Great Plains in western Meade County, South Dakota. The only remaining structure is the basement foundation of Pryor's house.
