= Trojan, South Dakota =

Trojan, South Dakota Portland
- Ghost town
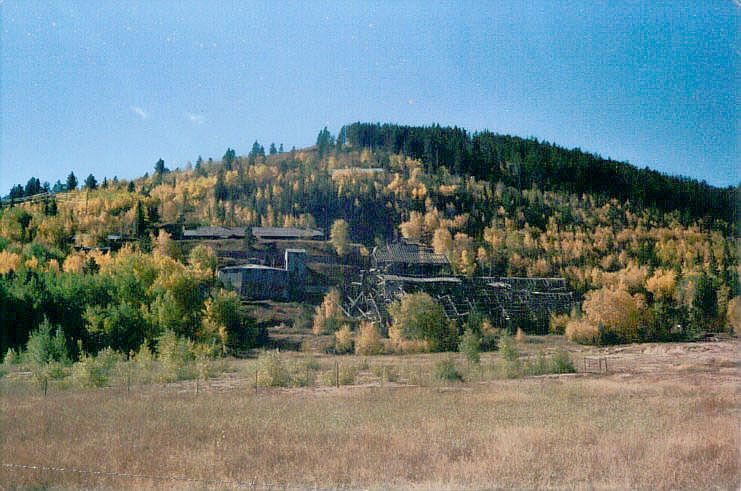
- Trojan area

- Location of Trojan in South Dakota.
- Coordinates: 44.3422063°N 103.8379795°W
- Country: United States
- State: South Dakota
- County: Lawrence County
- Abandoned: 1959
- Founder: Trojan Mining Company
- Elevation: 6,434 ft (1,961 m)
- Time zone: UTC-7 (MST)
  - Summer (DST): UTC-6 (MDT)

Trojan, also known as Portland, is a ghost town in the Black Hills of Lawrence County, South Dakota. It was established by and named after the Trojan Mining Company.

== Naming ==
Trojan got its name from its founding company, the Trojan Mining Company. Its earlier name, Portland, came from the nearby Portland Mine.

== History ==
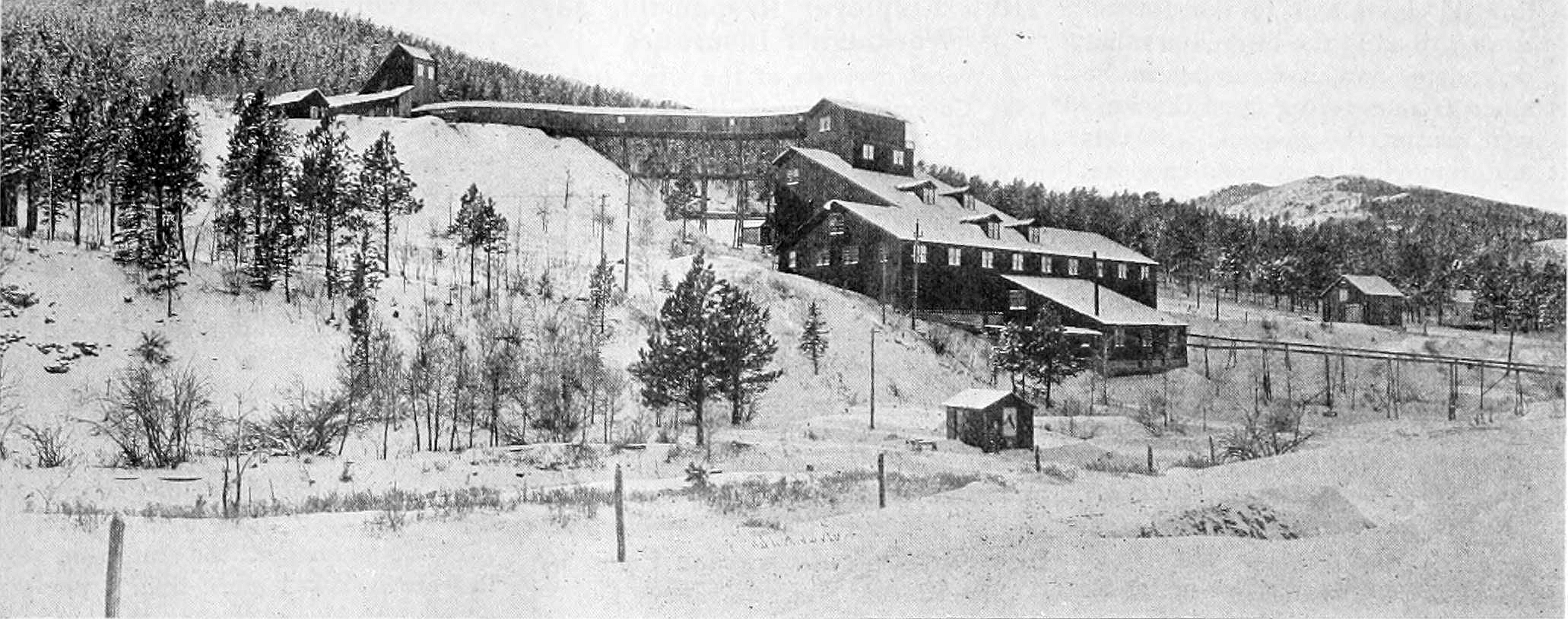
Cyanide plant of Trojan Mining Company in Trojan, 1919

As early as 1877, gold was known to be inside Bald Mountain and Green Mountain, located in the Trojan area. By 1900, many claims had been sorted out into only a few, and by 1911, the Trojan Mining Company held the majority of them. In 1928, the Trojan Mining Company was bought out by the Bald Mountain Mining Company. However, by the 1950s, the ore in the Trojan mines was only being sold for $6 per ton, which did not provide enough of a profit to keep the mines in operation. Steel and powder, which were required to run the mines, increased in price, but gold remained $35 an ounce, which it had been since 1934. In 1959, all operations shut down and every mining building, including the miners' homes, closed. In 1960, the mine's rails were removed. For a time, the town tried to revive itself by providing for skiers at Terry Peak, but they were not successful. In 1983, the open pit Wharf Mine was established in the Trojan area and continues in operation to this day. It has grown to the extent to have completely enveloped the old townsite and Bald Mountain Mill so that there are no historic remains at those sites.

== Geography ==
Trojan is located in the Black Hills of central Lawrence County, South Dakota, United States.
