= Weta, South Dakota =

Unincorporated community in South Dakota, U.S.

Coordinates: 43°46′28″N 101°43′01″W

Weta is an unincorporated community in Jackson County, in the U.S. state of South Dakota.

== History ==
Weta got its start in 1907 when the Milwaukee Railroad was extended to that point. A post office called Weta was established in 1908, and remained in operation until 1939.
