= Etta, South Dakota =

Etta, South Dakota Etta Camp, Etta Mine
- Ghost town
- Location of Etta in South Dakota.
- Coordinates (Etta Mine): 43.8808213°N 103.4185236°W
- Country: United States
- State: South Dakota
- County: Pennington County
- Elevation: 4,577 ft (1,395 m)
- Time zone: UTC-7 (MST)
  - Summer (DST): UTC-6 (MDT)

Etta, also known as Etta Camp and Etta Mine, is a ghost town in Pennington County, South Dakota, United States. It was a successful mining town, known for its discovery of the largest spodumene crystal ever found.

== History ==
Etta was in existence before the nearby town of Keystone. It was first started by the Harvey Peak Tin Mining, Milling, and Manufacturing Company as a mica mining camp. However, the ore was revealed to actually be cassiterite, a tin ore; this discovery caused dozens of new mines to spring up all over the Black Hills. Most of these mines were not successful because there was not a large amount of tin in the area. The company built a mill and smelter in 1883. During the mining operations, a large lump of tin weighing 1,200 pounds (540 kg) was melted from hand-picked cassiterite deposits; the miners described it as being as "big as a small boy." This tin was displayed to potential shareholders in London, England in order to raise support for the company. However, the company dissolved after a lawsuit, and the mine ceased operation until 1898. That year, the mine began producing spodumene, a lithium ore, and became well known for its huge crystals. The largest spodumene crystal in the world was found in the mine. Until about 1900, Etta had the only post office in the Keystone area, and by that time, its population was 24. In the 1920s, the mining operations flourished. The mine shut down in 1959, and the town was eventually abandoned. All that remains are the foundations of the smelter and mill, as well as the mine itself.

== Geography ==
Etta is located in the Black Hills of Pennington County. It is approximately one-half mile south of Keystone, and can be accessed using the Glendale road and turning south from U.S. Route 16A.
