= Spokane, South Dakota =

- Ghost town
- Location in the state of South Dakota
- Coordinates: 43.8413775°N 103.3799128°W
- Country: United States
- State: South Dakota
- County: Custer
- Founded: 1890
- Elevation: 4,521 ft (1,378 m)
- Demonym: Spokanite
- Time zone: UTC-7 (MST)
  - Summer (DST): UTC-6 (MDT)
- GNIS feature ID: 1262481

Spokane is a ghost town located in Custer County, South Dakota, United States. Founded in 1890, it was a mining camp in the Black Hills until its abandonment in the mid-20th century.

== Naming ==
Spokane was named after Spokane, Washington, by a local silver mine.

== History ==
Spokane was originally intended to be a gold mining town, but the Spokane Mine also produced silver, lead, beryl, copper, mica, hematite, graphite, and zinc. Both the town and mine were founded in 1890. 1927 was one of the town's best years, when the town's profits totaled $144,742. The town turned this money into a school, and several new miners entered the area.

The mine soon began to fail again, and it closed in 1940. By this decade, the town was already largely abandoned. In the 1950s, a few companies unsuccessfully tried to reopen the mine. The mine's buildings eventually burned down, and others that were deemed unsafe were destroyed by the U.S. Forest Service. A watchman remained in the town until the mid-1980s, and after that, the town was officially abandoned.

== Geography ==
Spokane was located in the Black Hills in Custer County, 16 miles (26 km) east of Custer. The former townsite sits near the three-way junction between Iron Mountain Road, County Road 330, and U.S. Route 16A. Only a few buildings remain, including the barn, watchman's house, school, and remnants of the mine.
