= Gayville, Lawrence County, South Dakota =

Unincorporated community in South Dakota, U.S.

Coordinates: 44°22′15″N 103°45′37″W

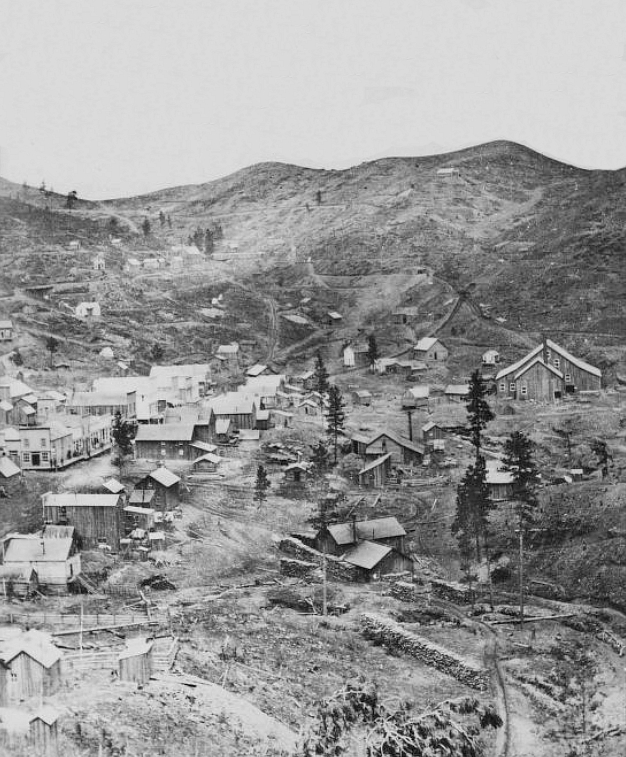
Gayville, 1877

Gayville is an unincorporated community in Lawrence County, in the U.S. state of South Dakota.

== History ==
Gayville was founded as a mining community in the 1870s by brothers Alfred and Wiliam Gay, and named for them.
