= Central City, South Dakota =

- City
- Location in Lawrence County and the state of South Dakota
- Coordinates: 44°22′07″N 103°46′14″W
- Country: United States
- State: South Dakota
- County: Lawrence
- Founded: 1877

Area
  - Total: 0.15 sq mi (0.38 km^{2})
  - Land: 0.15 sq mi (0.38 km^{2})
  - Water: 0 sq mi (0.00 km^{2})
- Elevation: 4,931 ft (1,503 m)

Population (2020)
  - Total: 93
  - Density: 629.4/sq mi (243.01/km^{2})
- Time zone: UTC-7 (Mountain (MST))
  - Summer (DST): UTC-6 (MDT)
- ZIP code: 57754
- Area code: 605
- FIPS code: 46-11140
- GNIS feature ID: 1267317

Central City is a city in Lawrence County, South Dakota, United States. The population was 93 at the 2020 census.

== History ==
Central City was founded in 1877. It was named after Central City, Colorado, by a settler from that community. It began as a mining town during the Black Hills Gold Rush days. There was once a quarrel over mining boundaries that resulted in a deliberate explosion of the nearby Comstock Mine and the death of one man. A miners' sit-down strike occurred and a cavalry unit from Fort Meade led by Seth Bullock was called in to end it.

== Geography ==
According to the United States Census Bureau, the city has a total area of 0.15 square miles (0.39 km^{2}), all land.

=== Climate ===
Climate data for Central City, South Dakota
Month	Jan	Feb	Mar	Apr	May	Jun	Jul	Aug	Sep	Oct	Nov	Dec	Year
Record high °F (°C)	69 (21)	66 (19)	74 (23)	84 (29)	88 (31)	96 (36)	99 (37)	98 (37)	96 (36)	84 (29)	74 (23)	65 (18)	99 (37)
Mean daily maximum °F (°C)	36 (2)	37 (3)	43 (6)	52 (11)	61 (16)	71 (22)	79 (26)	78 (26)	68 (20)	55 (13)	43 (6)	35 (2)	55 (13)
Mean daily minimum °F (°C)	17 (−8)	18 (−8)	23 (−5)	31 (−1)	40 (4)	49 (9)	56 (13)	55 (13)	45 (7)	34 (1)	24 (−4)	16 (−9)	34 (1)
Record low °F (°C)	−27 (−33)	−32 (−36)	−17 (−27)	−5 (−21)	9 (−13)	24 (−4)	36 (2)	33 (1)	15 (−9)	−5 (−21)	−16 (−27)	−33 (−36)	−33 (−36)
Average precipitation inches (mm)	1.34 (34)	1.65 (42)	2.58 (66)	3.55 (90)	4.64 (118)	3.57 (91)	2.76 (70)	2.09 (53)	1.99 (51)	3.04 (77)	1.83 (46)	1.51 (38)	30.55 (776)
Source: The Weather Channel (Historical Monthly Averages)

== Demographics ==
Historical population
Census	Pop.	Note	%±
1880	1,008		—
1890	519		−48.5%
1900	448		−13.7%
1910	296		−33.9%
1920	199		−32.8%
1930	198		−0.5%
1940	302		52.5%
1950	218		−27.8%
1960	247		13.3%
1970	188		−23.9%
1980	177		−5.9%
1990	185		4.5%
2000	149		−19.5%
2010	134		−10.1%
2020	93		−30.6%
U.S. Decennial Census

=== 2020 census ===
As of the 2020 census, Central City had a population of 93. The median age was 57.3 years. 6.5% of residents were under the age of 18 and 34.4% of residents were 65 years of age or older. For every 100 females there were 126.8 males, and for every 100 females age 18 and over there were 123.1 males age 18 and over.

100.0% of residents lived in urban areas, while 0.0% lived in rural areas.

There were 55 households in Central City, of which 10.9% had children under the age of 18 living in them. Of all households, 36.4% were married-couple households, 25.5% were households with a male householder and no spouse or partner present, and 29.1% were households with a female householder and no spouse or partner present. About 34.5% of all households were made up of individuals and 21.8% had someone living alone who was 65 years of age or older.

There were 70 housing units, of which 21.4% were vacant. The homeowner vacancy rate was 0.0% and the rental vacancy rate was 38.9%.

Racial composition as of the 2020 census
Race	Number	Percent
White	84	90.3%
Black or African American	0	0.0%
American Indian and Alaska Native	1	1.1%
Asian	1	1.1%
Native Hawaiian and Other Pacific Islander	0	0.0%
Some other race	0	0.0%
Two or more races	7	7.5%
Hispanic or Latino (of any race)	2	2.2%

=== 2010 census ===
As of the census of 2010, there were 134 people, 66 households, and 37 families living in the city. The population density was 893.3 inhabitants per square mile (344.9/km^{2}). There were 78 housing units at an average density of 520.0 per square mile (200.8/km^{2}). The racial makeup of the city was 94.0% White, 1.5% Native American, 0.7% from other races, and 3.7% from two or more races. Hispanic or Latino of any race were 0.7% of the population.

There were 66 households, of which 18.2% had children under the age of 18 living with them, 34.8% were married couples living together, 12.1% had a female householder with no husband present, 9.1% had a male householder with no wife present, and 43.9% were non-families. 33.3% of all households were made up of individuals, and 9.1% had someone living alone who was 65 years of age or older. The average household size was 2.03 and the average family size was 2.41.

The median age in the city was 48.7 years. 11.9% of residents were under the age of 18; 5.9% were between the ages of 18 and 24; 23.2% were from 25 to 44; 45.6% were from 45 to 64; and 13.4% were 65 years of age or older. The gender makeup of the city was 47.8% male and 52.2% female.

=== 2000 census ===
As of the census of 2000, there were 149 people, 67 households, and 39 families living in the city. The population density was 1,033.0 inhabitants per square mile (398.8/km^{2}). There were 76 housing units at an average density of 526.9 per square mile (203.4/km^{2}). The racial makeup of the city was 99.33% White and 0.67% Asian.

There were 67 households, out of which 19.4% had children under the age of 18 living with them, 53.7% were married couples living together, 4.5% had a female householder with no husband present, and 40.3% were non-families. 32.8% of all households were made up of individuals, and 7.5% had someone living alone who was 65 years of age or older. The average household size was 2.22 and the average family size was 2.80.

In the city, the population was spread out, with 19.5% under the age of 18, 5.4% from 18 to 24, 33.6% from 25 to 44, 33.6% from 45 to 64, and 8.1% who were 65 years of age or older. The median age was 43 years. For every 100 females, there were 112.9 males. For every 100 females age 18 and over, there were 118.2 males.

The median income for a household in the city was $21,250, and the median income for a family was $31,250. Males had a median income of $23,750 versus $18,438 for females. The per capita income for the city was $12,870. There were 10.5% of families and 15.9% of the population living below the poverty line, including 17.4% of under eighteens and 21.4% of those over 64.

== Education ==
It is in Lead-Deadwood School District 40-1.
