= National Register of Historic Places listings in Pennington County, South Dakota =

Location of Pennington County in South Dakota

This is a list of the National Register of Historic Places listings in Pennington County, South Dakota.

This is intended to be a complete list of the properties and districts on the National Register of Historic Places in Pennington County, South Dakota, United States. The locations of National Register properties and districts for which the latitude and longitude coordinates are included below, may be seen in a map.

There are 63 properties and districts listed on the National Register in the county. One property was once listed but has since been delisted.

This National Park Service list is complete through NPS recent listings posted August 28, 2026.

== Current listings ==
	Name on the Register	Image	Date listed	Location	City or town	Description
1	Archeological Site No. 39PN376	Archeological Site No. 39PN376	October 25, 1993 (#93001072)	Address restricted	Custer	
2	Black Hills Model Home	Black Hills Model Home	December 15, 2004 (#04001366)	2101 West Boulevard; 44°03′54″N 103°14′07″W	Rapid City	
3	Burlington and Quincy High Line Hill City to Keystone Branch	Burlington and Quincy High Line Hill City to Keystone Branch	February 5, 2003 (#02001768)	Along the railroad right of way from 222 Railroad Ave to Keystone Depot; 43°54′51″N 103°30′06″W	Hill City	
4	Lewis Byron House	Lewis Byron House	June 17, 1982 (#82003935)	Cemetery Rd. 43°53′10″N 103°25′13″W	Keystone	Rustic log house built in 1927 above Rapid Creek, designed by A.I. Johnson with chimney stonework by a mason named Nystrom. Byron ran the Holy Terror mine.
5	Calumet Hotel	Calumet Hotel	January 7, 2000 (#99001659)	Ash and B Ave. 44°04′04″N 102°26′47″W	Wasta	
6	Casper Supply Company of SD	Casper Supply Company of SD	August 16, 2000 (#00000996)	415 Main St. 44°04′50″N 103°13′26″W	Rapid City	
7	Cassidy House	Cassidy House	December 2, 1998 (#98001407)	4121 Canyon Lake Rd. 44°03′53″N 103°17′16″W	Rapid City	All-steel, Lustron Newport 2-Bedroom home built in 1950. This is one of only 24 two-bedroom Newport homes ever manufactured by Lustron. Lustron manufactured 2,498 all-steel houses from 1948 to 1950 before they were forced to file for bankruptcy.
8	Chapel in the Hills	Chapel in the Hills	August 7, 2012 (#12000487)	3788 Chapel Ln. 44°02′57″N 103°17′59″W	Rapid City	
9	Church of the Immaculate Conception	Church of the Immaculate Conception	June 5, 1975 (#75001721)	918 5th St. 44°04′33″N 103°13′31″W	Rapid City	
10	Civilian Conservation Corp Camp F-10	Civilian Conservation Corp Camp F-10	January 28, 2004 (#03001531)	13381 Silver Mountain Rd. 43°56′56″N 103°22′53″W	Rapid City	
11	Dean Motor Company	Dean Motor Company	June 23, 1995 (#95000768)	329 Main St. 44°04′49″N 103°13′21″W	Rapid City	
12	Dinosaur Park	Dinosaur Park	June 21, 1990 (#90000956)	Skyline Dr. southwest of Lincoln School; 44°04′40″N 103°14′42″W	Rapid City	
13	Emmanuel Episcopal Church	Emmanuel Episcopal Church	May 29, 1975 (#75001722)	717 Quincy St. 44°04′41″N 103°13′50″W	Rapid City	
14	Fairmont Creamery Company Building	Fairmont Creamery Company Building	February 14, 2006 (#06000048)	201 Main St. 44°04′55″N 103°13′18″W	Rapid City	
15	Feigel House	Feigel House	March 3, 1997 (#97000145)	328 E. New York St. 44°05′05″N 103°12′21″W	Rapid City	
16	First Congregational Church	First Congregational Church	February 23, 1984 (#84003372)	715 Kansas City St. 44°04′45″N 103°13′47″W	Rapid City	
17	Gambrill Storage Building	Gambrill Storage Building	February 23, 1984 (#84003379)	822 Main St. 44°04′55″N 103°13′52″W	Rapid City	
18	Golden Summit Mine Foreman's Cabin	Golden Summit Mine Foreman's Cabin	August 7, 2012 (#12000488)	24085 Palmer Gulch Rd. 43°54′57″N 103°32′03″W	Hill City	
19	Gramberg Ranch		December 17, 1999 (#99001584)	14895 Lower Spring Rd. 43°54′30″N 103°05′02″W	Hermosa	
20	Harney Peak Hotel	Harney Peak Hotel	April 11, 1977 (#77001252)	U.S. Route 16; 43°55′58″N 103°34′30″W	Hill City	
21	Harney Peak Lookout Tower, Dam, Pumphouse and Stairway	Harney Peak Lookout Tower, Dam, Pumphouse and Stairway	March 10, 1983 (#83003019)	Northeast of Custer; 43°51′57″N 103°31′55″W	Custer	
22	Harney Peak Tin Mining Company Buildings	Harney Peak Tin Mining Company Buildings	July 21, 1977 (#77001251)	U.S. Route 16; 43°56′08″N 103°33′53″W	Hill City	
23	Zack Holmes House	Zack Holmes House	June 17, 1982 (#82003937)	818 St. James St. 44°04′22″N 103°13′57″W	Rapid City	
24	House and Sawmill Johnson Siding		June 17, 1982 (#82003938)	Rimrock Highway; 44°04′50″N 103°26′26″W	Rapid City	
25	Keystone School	Keystone School	February 22, 1981 (#81000577)	3rd St. 43°53′43″N 103°25′11″W	Keystone	Large rural school built 1897-1900 by Eli Shomaker, with roof of wood shingles. Now the Keystone Historical Museum.
26	Keystone Trading Company Store	Keystone Trading Company Store	June 17, 1982 (#82003936)	Highway 40; 43°53′47″N 103°25′07″W	Keystone	
27	Josef and Marie Kudrna Homestead and Ranch		January 21, 2015 (#14001185)	18100 E. SD 44; 43°45′16″N 102°26′27″W	Scenic	
28	Madison Ranch		August 14, 2003 (#03000767)	8800 Nemo Rd. 44°07′11″N 103°21′48″W	Rapid City	
29	C.E. McEachron General Merchandise	C.E. McEachron General Merchandise	June 3, 1994 (#94000565)	349 Main St. 43°55′52″N 103°34′31″W	Hill City	
30	Milwaukee Road Freight House	Milwaukee Road Freight House	January 19, 1989 (#88003200)	306 7th St. 44°04′47″N 103°13′38″W	Rapid City	
31	Minuteman Missile National Historic Site	Minuteman Missile National Historic Site	November 29, 1999 (#01000275)	I-90 north of Rapid City; 43°55′52″N 102°09′38″W	Rapid City	Extends into Jackson County, South Dakota.
32	Motor Service Company	Motor Service Company	June 23, 1995 (#95000766)	402 St. Joseph St. 44°04′47″N 103°13′24″W	Rapid City	
33	Mount Rushmore National Memorial	Mount Rushmore National Memorial	October 15, 1966 (#66000718)	3 miles west of Keystone off U.S. Route 16A; 43°52′40″N 103°27′20″W	Keystone	
34	Mystic Townsite Historic District	Mystic Townsite Historic District	August 1, 1986 (#86002093)	Address restricted	Mystic	
35	Maurice Nelson House	Maurice Nelson House	December 2, 1998 (#98001403)	101 E. Quincy St. 44°04′35″N 103°12′51″W	Rapid City	
36	Nichols Funeral Home Building	Nichols Funeral Home Building	January 28, 2004 (#03001532)	832 St. Joseph; 44°04′59″N 103°13′57″W	Rapid City	
37	Otho Mining District	Otho Mining District	December 15, 2004 (#04001365)	13380 Greyhound Gulch; 43°51′15″N 103°23′04″W	Otho	
38	Pennington County Courthouse	Pennington County Courthouse	May 28, 1976 (#76001751)	301 St. Joseph St. 44°04′44″N 103°13′21″W	Rapid City	
39	Quinn Methodist Church	Quinn Methodist Church	January 23, 2007 (#06001308)	Junction of Elm and Main Streets; 43°59′22″N 102°07′40″W	Quinn	
40	Michael Quinn House	Michael Quinn House	August 5, 1993 (#93000782)	728 6th St. 44°04′40″N 103°13′36″W	Rapid City	
41	Rapid City Carnegie Library	Rapid City Carnegie Library	February 17, 1981 (#81000578)	604 Kansas City St. 44°04′46″N 103°13′39″W	Rapid City	
42	Rapid City Fruit Company	Rapid City Fruit Company	December 9, 1993 (#93001340)	320 7th St. 44°05′30″N 103°13′39″W	Rapid City	
43	Rapid City Garage	Rapid City Garage	August 1, 1984 (#84003381)	827-829 Main St. 44°04′54″N 103°13′53″W	Rapid City	
44	Rapid City High School	Rapid City High School	June 28, 2010 (#10000409)	615 Columbus St. 44°04′37″N 103°13′43″W	Rapid City	
45	Rapid City Historic Commercial District	Rapid City Historic Commercial District	October 1, 1974 (#74001897)	Bounded by both sides of Main, St. Joseph, 7th, and 6th Sts. • Boundary increase (listed July 9, 1998, refnum 98000841): Roughly along St. Joseph and Main Sts. from Mt. Rushmore and 5th Sts. 44°04′51″N 103°13′39″W	Rapid City	
46	Rapid City Historical Museum	Rapid City Historical Museum	December 20, 1988 (#88002837)	515 West Boulevard; 44°04′54″N 103°14′08″W	Rapid City	
47	Rapid City Laundry	Rapid City Laundry	June 23, 1995 (#95000767)	312 Main St. 44°04′50″N 103°13′16″W	Rapid City	
48	Rapid City Masonic Temple	Rapid City Masonic Temple	December 6, 2016 (#16000828)	618 Kansas City St. 44°04′45″N 103°13′43″W	Rapid City	
49	Rapid City West Boulevard Historic District	Rapid City West Boulevard Historic District	December 31, 1974 (#74001898)	Bordered by Kansas City, Fairview, 11th, 7th, and 8th Sts. • Boundary increase (listed July 7, 1995, refnum 95000770): Roughly the area surrounding 9th, 10th, and 11th Sts. from Kansas City St. to St. Andrews St. 44°04′38″N 103°14′00″W	Rapid City	
50	Joseph Reynolds Ranch Yard and Stage Stop		November 4, 2022 (#100008362)	22875 South Rochford Rd. 44°06′31″N 103°48′49″W	Rochford	
51	Glenn W. Shaw House	Glenn W. Shaw House	June 27, 2002 (#02000706)	803 West St. 44°04′47″N 103°14′27″W	Rapid City	
52	Site No. 39 PN 57	Site No. 39 PN 57	May 20, 1982 (#82004778)	Address restricted	City restricted	
53	Site No. 39 PN 108	Site No. 39 PN 108	May 20, 1982 (#82004775)	Address restricted	City restricted	
54	Site No. 39 PN 438	Site No. 39 PN 438	May 20, 1982 (#82004776)	Address restricted	City restricted	
55	Site No. 39 PN 439	Site No. 39 PN 439	May 20, 1982 (#82004777)	Address restricted	City restricted	
56	Sitting Bull Crystal Cavern Dance Pavilion	Sitting Bull Crystal Cavern Dance Pavilion	December 14, 1995 (#95001475)	U.S. Route 16 northeast of Rockerville; 43°58′21″N 103°18′45″W	Rockerville	
57	South Dakota Department of Transportation Bridge No. 52-575-383	South Dakota Department of Transportation Bridge No. 52-575-383	December 17, 1999 (#99001586)	Local road over Rapid Creek; 43°58′01″N 102°54′31″W	Caputa	
58	South Dakota Department of Transportation Bridge No. 52-824-300	South Dakota Department of Transportation Bridge No. 52-824-300	December 17, 1999 (#99001585)	Local road over the Cheyenne River; 44°04′52″N 102°24′04″W	Wasta	
59	South Dakota Stockgrowers Association Building		May 23, 2024 (#100010394)	426 St. Joseph St. 44°04′47″N 103°13′30″W	Rapid City	
60	Swander Bakery Building	Swander Bakery Building	February 9, 2001 (#01000099)	601 12th St. 44°04′53″N 103°14′17″W	Rapid City	
61	Von Woehrmann Building	Von Woehrmann Building	April 13, 1977 (#77001253)	U.S. Route 16; 43°55′44″N 103°34′33″W	Hill City	
62	Wasta Rest Stop Tipi-Eastbound	Wasta Rest Stop Tipi-Eastbound	January 20, 2015 (#14001186)	Mi. 98.6 on I-90; 44°03′47″N 102°26′23″W	Wasta	
63	Wasta Rest Stop Tipi-Westbound	Wasta Rest Stop Tipi-Westbound	January 20, 2015 (#14001187)	Mi. 98.6 on I-90; 44°03′54″N 102°26′04″W	Wasta	

== Former listing ==
	Name on the Register	Image	Date listed	Date removed	Location	City or town	Description
1	Pap Madison Cabin	Pap Madison Cabin	February 19, 2008 (#08000054)	December 12, 2017	Bounded by W. Main St., St. Joseph St., and West Boulevard; 44°05′02″N 103°14′17″W	Rapid City	Moved to The Journey Museum & Learning Center at 222 New York St. in 2012.

== See also ==
- List of National Historic Landmarks in South Dakota
- National Register of Historic Places listings in South Dakota
