= Cassidy House =

Cassidy House may refer to:

in the United States

(by state then city)

- Cassidy House (Bridgeport, Connecticut), listed on the National Register of Historic Places (NRHP) in Fairfield County
- James J. Cassidy House, Cleveland, New Mexico, listed on the NRHP in Mora County
- Daniel Cassidy House, Mora, New Mexico, listed on the NRHP in Mora County
- Cassidy House (Rapid City, South Dakota), listed on the NRHP in Pennington County
- James Cassidy House, Park City, Utah, listed on the NRHP in Summit County
- Cassidy Farmhouse, Barneveld, Wisconsin, listed on the NRHP in Iowa County
