= Gramberg =

Gramberg is a surname. Notable people with the surname include:

- Carl Peter Wilhelm Gramberg (1797–1830), German theologian and biblical scholar
- Jan Simon Gerardus Gramberg (1823–1888), Dutch author, military physician, plantation owner and adventurer
- Liliana Gramberg (1921–1996), Italian-born American printmaker and painter

== See also ==
- Gramberg Ranch, in Pennington County (South Dakota near Hermosa) was listed on the National Register of Historic Places in 1999
