= Badlands Observatory =

Observatory in South Dakota, US

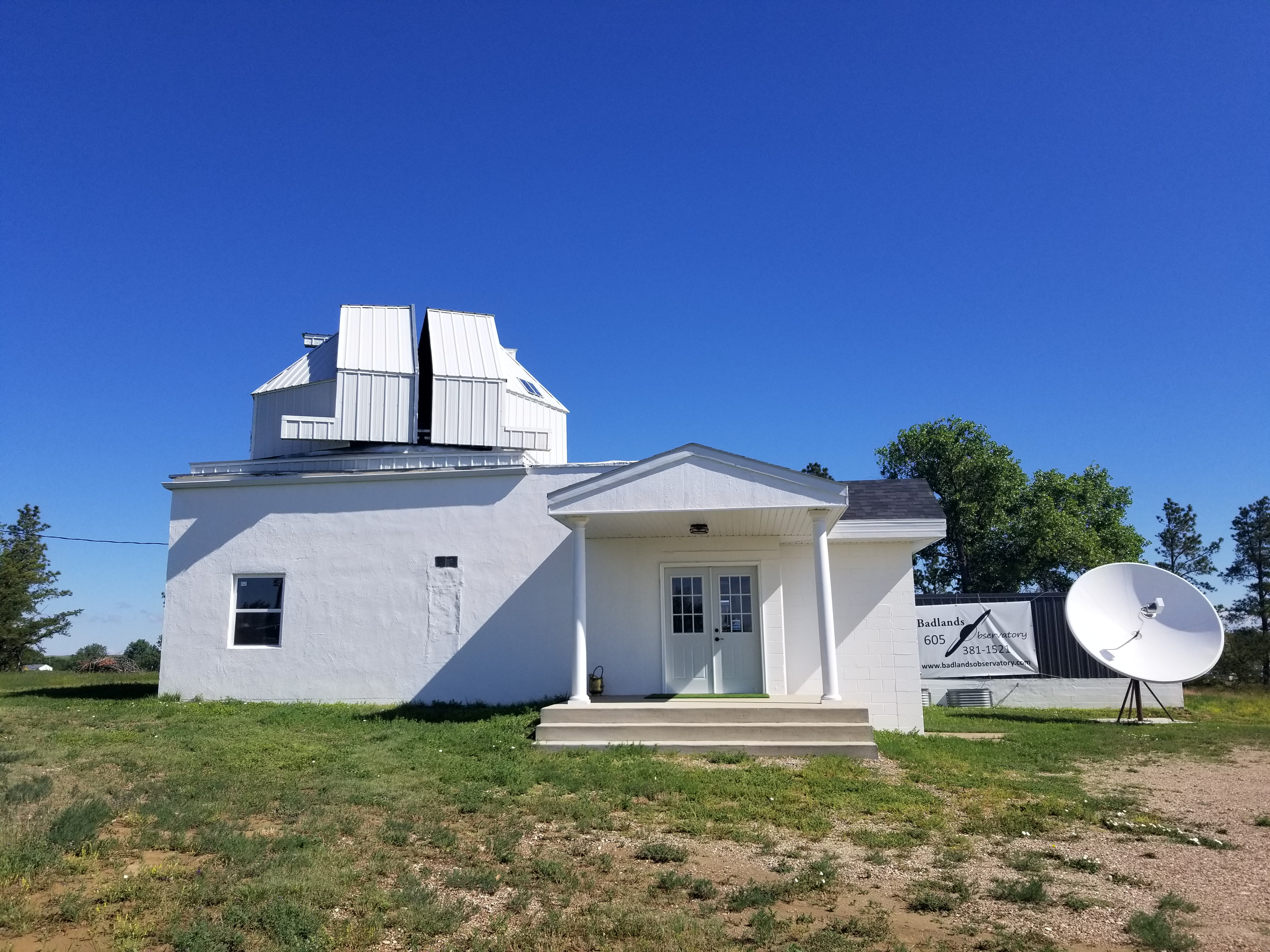
- The observatory in 2022
- Named after: Badlands National Park
- Organization: Badlands Observatory LLC
- Observatory code: 918
- Location: Quinn, South Dakota, US
- Coordinates: 43°59′27″N 102°7′51″W
- Website: www.badlandsobservatory.com

Telescopes
- unnamed: 26-inch reflector

Minor planets discovered: 8
see § List of discovered minor planets

The Badlands Observatory (IAU code 918) is an astronomical observatory named after the Badlands National Park, located in Quinn, South Dakota, United States, near the city of Wall. The observatory was established in 2000 by American amateur astronomer Ron Dyvig, who was affiliated with the Optical Sciences Center and Steward Observatory at the University of Arizona. While there, he occasionally participated in observing runs using the telescopes on Kitt Peak. Kitt Peak Observatory As of November 2016, a total of 25 numbered minor planets were discovered at the observatory. The Minor Planet Center credits these discoveries to Ron Dyvig and to the observatory, respectively. The main-belt asteroid (315495) 2008 AQ_{3} was discovered by Italian amateur astronomer Fabrizio Tozzi while using the Badlands Observatory telescope remotely via the Internet in 2008. Asteroid 26715 South Dakota, discovered by Ron Dyvig in 2001, is named after the U.S. state where the Badlands observatory is located.

The observatory in 2021, at sunset

When the observatory opened in a former medical facility, the town of Quinn installed hoods over the street lights to reduce light pollution.

== List of discovered minor planets ==
The Minor Planet Center credits the discovery of the following minor planets directly to the Badlands Observatory:

(26715) South Dakota	16 April 2001	list
(51570) Phendricksen	17 April 2001	list
(51772) Sparker	16 June 2001	list
(54720) Kentstevens	15 May 2001	list
(63528) Kocherhans	13 August 2001	list
(82361) Benitoloyola	23 June 2001	list
(94291) Django	21 February 2001	list
(134973) 2001 FA	16 March 2001	list

(160882) 2001 PC_{29}	15 August 2001	list
(208349) 2001 RX_{10}	11 September 2001	list
(220245) 2002 XR_{45}	10 December 2002	list
(222433) 2001 QB	16 August 2001	list
(241780) 2001 OK	17 July 2001	list
(252591) 2001 XO_{1}	9 December 2001	list
(315495) 2008 AQ_{3}	10 January 2008	list

== See also ==
- List of asteroid-discovering observatories
- List of astronomical observatories
- List of minor planet discoverers § Discovering dedicated institutions
- List of observatory codes
