= Rapid City Garage =

- U.S. National Register of Historic Places
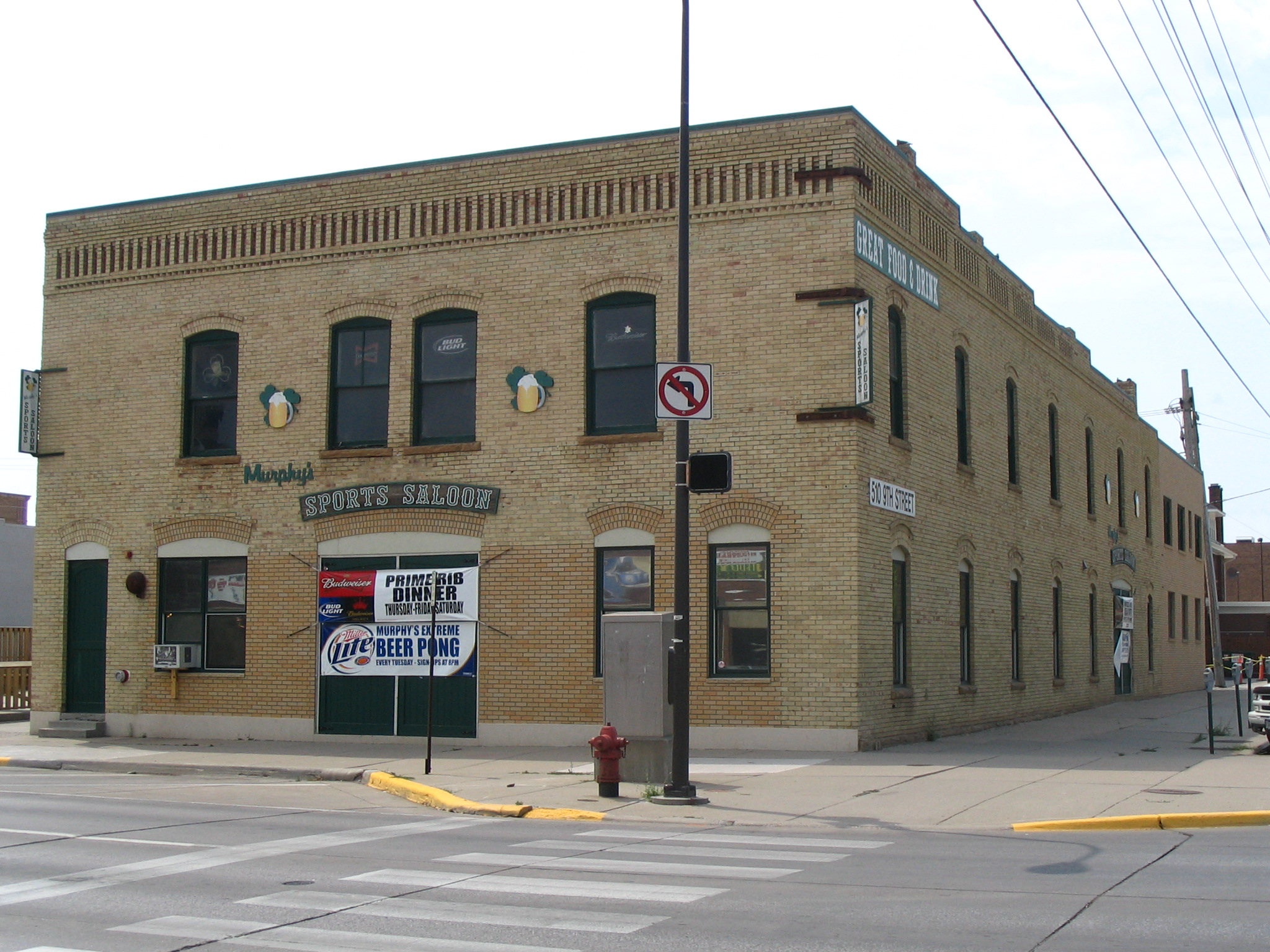
- The building in 2007

- Location within South Dakota Location within the United States
- Location: 827-829 Main Street, Rapid City, South Dakota
- Coordinates: 44°04′54″N 103°13′53″W
- Area: less than one acre
- Built: 1911
- NRHP reference No.: 84003381
- Added to NRHP: August 1, 1984

The Rapid City Garage is a historic two-story building in Rapid City, South Dakota. It was built in 1911. The second floor was initially a hotel and later a nursing home until 1965. The building has been listed on the National Register of Historic Places since August 1, 1984.
