= C.E. McEachron General Merchandise =

- McEachron, C. E., General Merchandise
- U.S. National Register of Historic Places
- The building in 2020

- Location within South Dakota Location within the United States
- Location: 349 Main Street, Hill City, South Dakota
- Coordinates: 43°55′52″N 103°34′31″W
- Area: less than one acre
- Built: 1902
- Architectural style: Early Commercial
- NRHP reference No.: 94000565
- Added to NRHP: June 3, 1994

The C.E. McEachron General Merchandise is a historic two-story building in Hill City, South Dakota. It was built in 1902 by Charles E. McEachron, an investor who also owned the local bank. McEachron was born in New York state in 1855 and he moved to the Dakota Territory as a pioneer in 1880; he died in 1939. The building has been listed on the National Register of Historic Places since June 3, 1994.
