= Hotel Alex Johnson =

Hotel in Rapid City, South Dakota

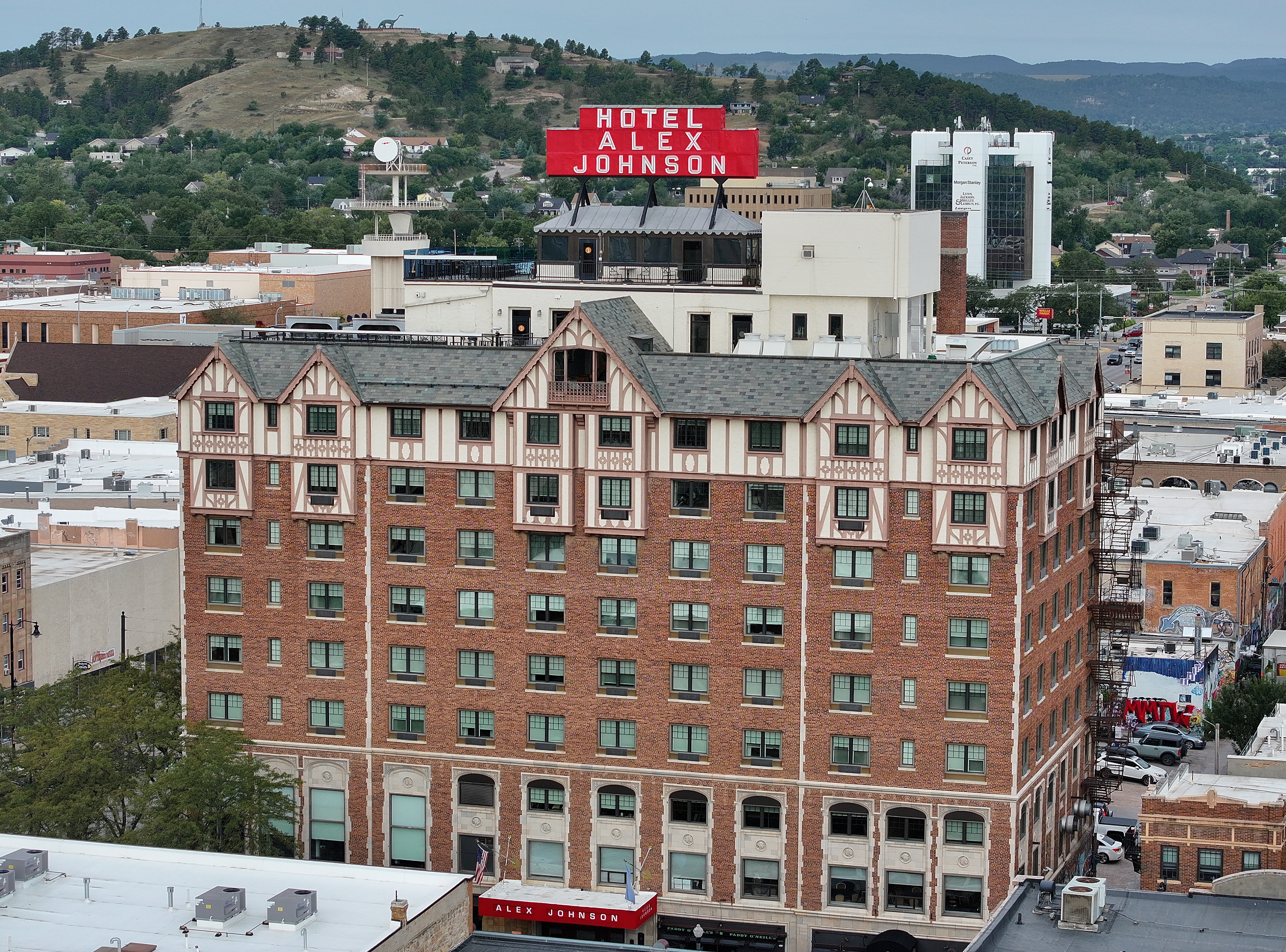
- Hotel Alex Johnson
- Interactive map of the Hotel Alex Johnson area

General information
- Architectural style: Tudor Revival
- Location: Rapid City, South Dakota, 523 Sixth Street
- Coordinates: 44.080393°N 103.227527°W
- Opening: July 1, 1928; 98 years ago
- Owner: Hilton Hotels & Resorts
- Operator: Liv Hospitality

Technical details
- Floor count: 11

Design and construction
- Architect: Oldefest & Williams
- Developer: Hotel Alex Johnson Inc.

Other information
- Number of rooms: 143
- Public transit: Rapid Ride

Website
- www.alexjohnson.com
- Hotel Alex Johnson
- U.S. Historic district – Contributing property
- Part of: Rapid City Historic Commercial District (ID74001897)
- Designated CP: October 1, 1974

The Hotel Alex Johnson is a historic hotel in Rapid City, South Dakota. It was opened in 1928 by its namesake, Alex Carlton Johnson. From 1956 to 1968, it was operated by Sheraton Hotels and Resorts and was known as the Sheraton-Johnson Hotel. Today, it is part of the Curio Collection by Hilton Hotels & Resorts and is managed by Liv Hospitality.

In 1974, it was listed on the National Register of Historic Places as a contributing property to the Rapid City Historic Commercial District.

== History ==
The hotel was built by its namesake, Alex Carlton Johnson, Vice President of the Chicago & North Western Railroad. Construction began on August 19, 1927, one day before work began on nearby Mount Rushmore. Originally called Hay Camp, the hotel opened on July 1, 1928, and was officially dedicated on August 11, 1928. The building was designed by Chicago architects Oldefest & Williams.

It was sold to the Eppley Hotel Company in 1947. That chain was bought by Sheraton Hotels and Resorts in 1956 and the hotel was renamed the Sheraton-Johnson Hotel. Sheraton sold the hotel in 1965 but continued to operate it under a franchise contract until 1968, when it regained its original name.

The hotel is currently managed by Liv Hospitality. In 2016, a restoration project was announced to update the building's infrastructure and refurbish the interior for an estimated total of $7 million.

== Architecture ==
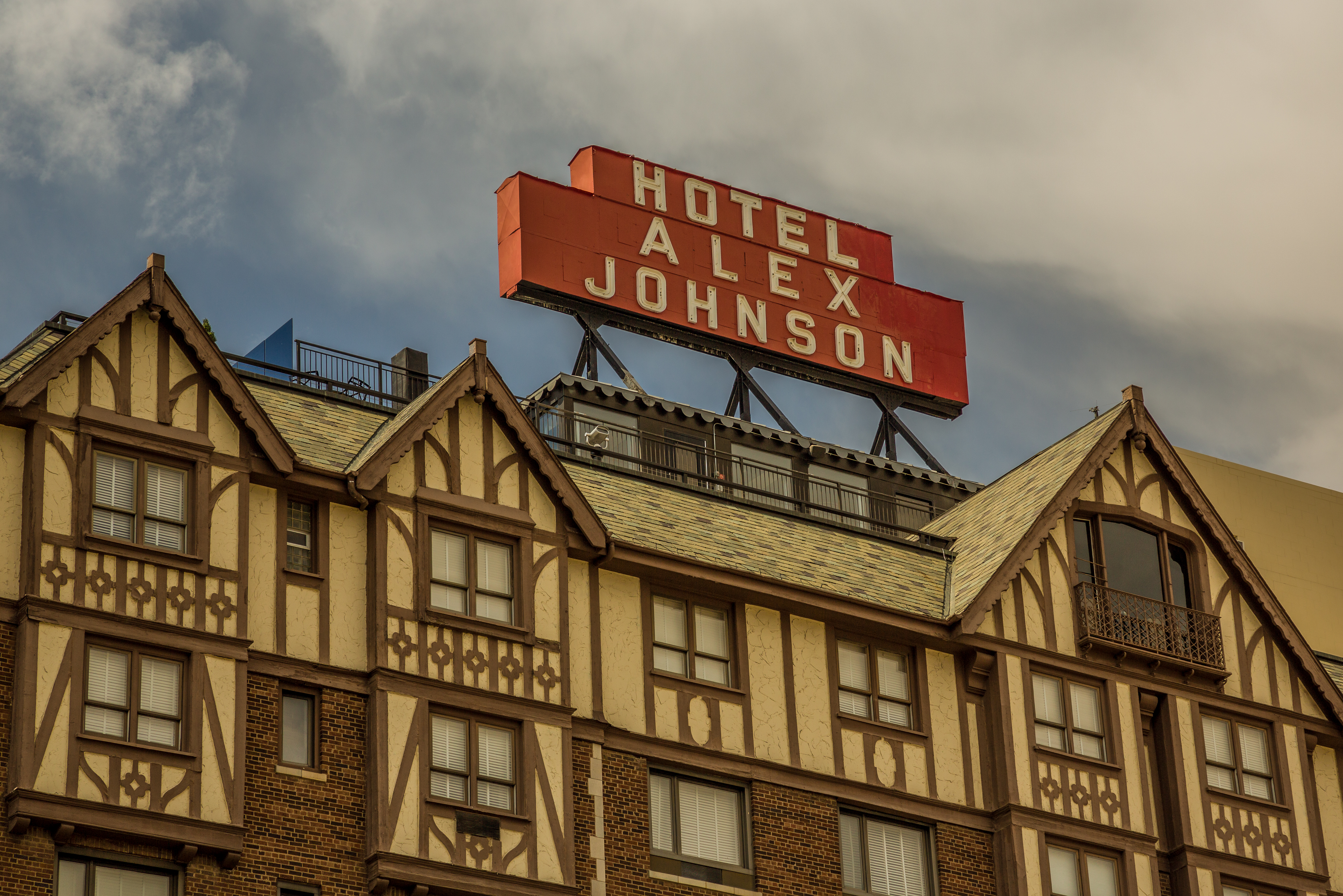
Hotel Alex Johnson roof sign

The Hotel Alex Johnson is an eight-story brick structure that combines Tudor Revival architecture with vernacular elements. It has decorative masonry and a flat roof. Its interior is decorated with Western and Native American design elements. Several original features are still present, including a teepee-shaped chandelier, hand-drawn motifs on the ceilings, and wooden sculptures of Native American chiefs.

It was one of the earliest tall buildings in South Dakota and is the tallest building in Rapid City.

== Paranormal folklore ==
The Hotel Alex Johnson has long been rumored to be haunted by several ghosts. Reports of paranormal activity include objects moving by themselves, figures in mirrors, and disembodied footsteps or voices. Reportedly, a ghost called the Lady in White haunts room 812 after dying there. Others report sightings of the ghost of Johnson himself.

The hotel keeps several books detailing guests' paranormal experiences at the front desk. As of December 2024, the book that was kept on the front desk has been stolen. In 2011, the television show Ghost Hunters filmed an episode about the hotel for its seventh season. The hotel offers a Ghost Adventure Package, inviting guests to stay in the most haunted rooms with a provided EMF reader.

== In popular culture ==
The Sheraton-Johnson Hotel is mentioned numerous times in dialogue in the 1959 Alfred Hitchcock film North by Northwest as the hotel where the mysterious George Kaplan will be staying. Hitchcock, Cary Grant and Eva Marie Saint stayed at the hotel while filming at nearby Mount Rushmore.
