= Gambrill Storage Building =

- U.S. National Register of Historic Places
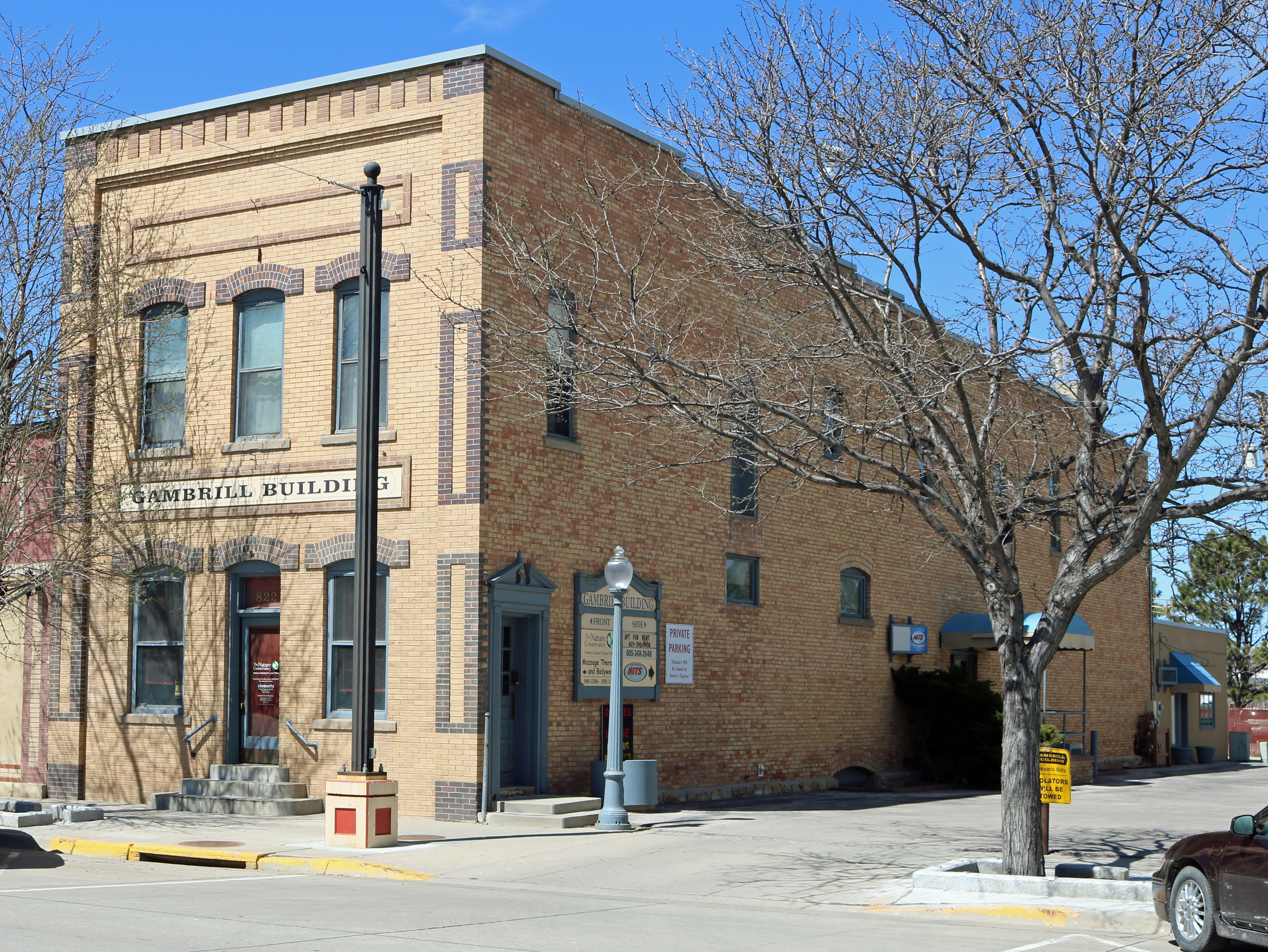
- The building in 2017

- Location within South Dakota Location within the United States
- Location: 822 Main Street, Rapid City, South Dakota
- Coordinates: 44°04′55″N 103°13′52″W
- Area: less than one acre
- Built: 1910
- Architectural style: Renaissance
- NRHP reference No.: 84003379
- Added to NRHP: February 23, 1984

The Gambrill Storage Building is a historic two-story building in Rapid City, South Dakota. It was designed in the Renaissance Revival style, and built in 1910 by Horace C. Gambrill.

It was reported in the Rapid City Journal in 1910 that it was then the only storage building/warehouse in town. Another RCJ article from 1984 noted, "the building retains its original rectangular windows capped with arched lintels and its contrasting colored brick on the front facade."

It has been listed in the National Register of Historic Places since February 23, 1984.
