= Rapid City Historic Commercial District =

- U.S. National Register of Historic Places
- U.S. Historic district
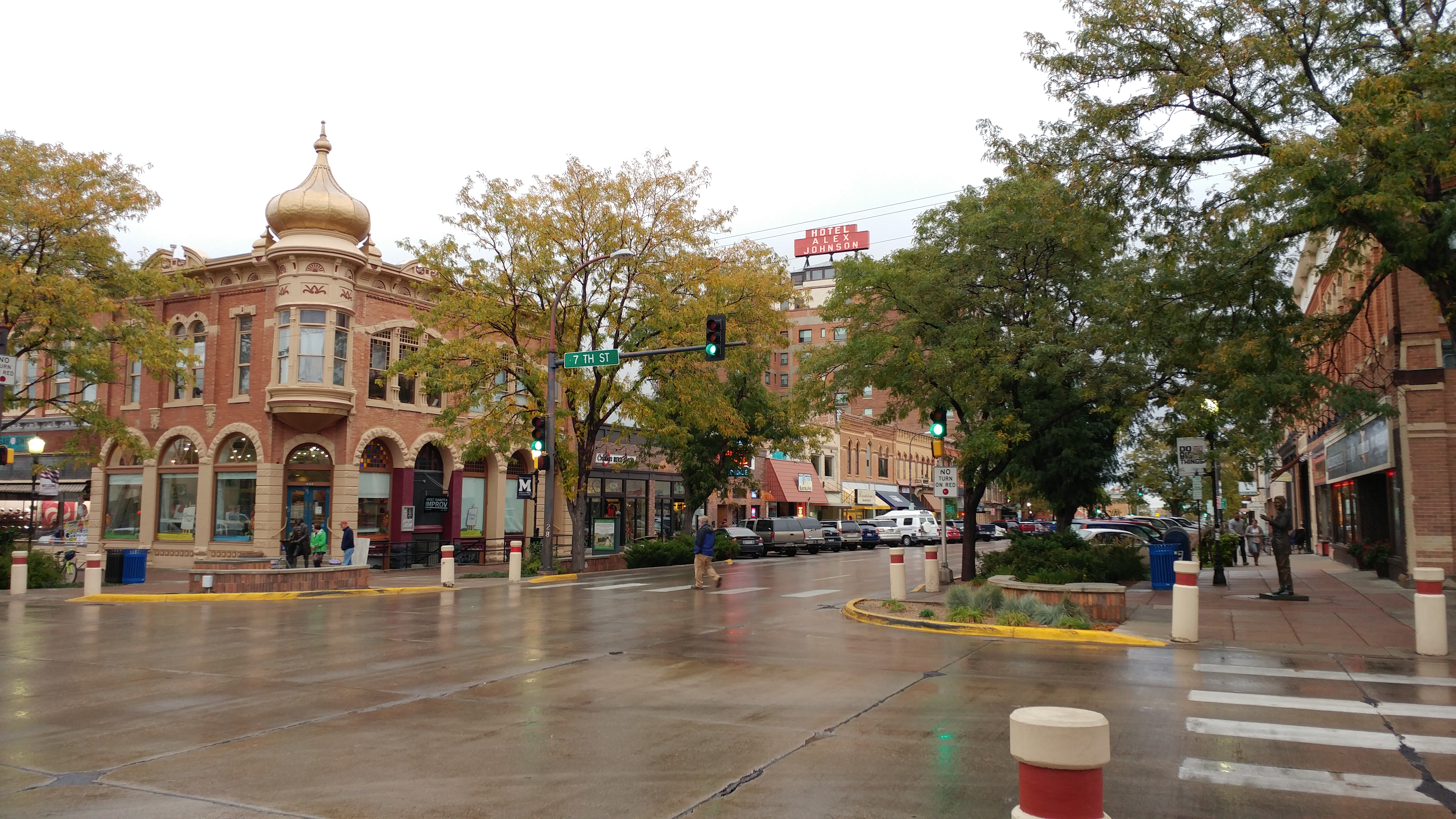
- Intersection of 7th and St. Joseph Streets, with the Buell Building and Hotel Alex Johnson visible
- Interactive map of Rapid City Historic Commercial District
- Location: downtown Rapid City, South Dakota
- Area: 21 acres (8.5 ha)
- Built: 1876
- Architectural style: Neoclassical, Renaissance Revival, Italianate, Romanesque Revival, Chicago School
- NRHP reference No.: 74001897 (original); 98000841 (increase)

Significant dates
- Added to NRHP: October 1, 1974
- Boundary increase: July 9, 1998

The Rapid City Historic Commercial District, sometimes called the Rapid City Downtown Historic District, is a 21-acre (8.5 ha), multi-block historic district in downtown Rapid City, South Dakota, United States. It includes 47 commercial buildings dating from the late 19th to early 20th centuries that formed the core of Rapid City's early economy. It was first listed on the National Register of Historic Places in 1974 and then expanded to its current size in 1998.

== Description ==
The historic district spans across multiple blocks in the center of downtown Rapid City. 10 acres (4.0 ha) of Main, Saint Joseph, 6th, and 7th Streets formed the rough boundaries of the original 1974 listing, with 38 properties on both sides of the streets included, although some buildings on 5th Street were also included. These buildings were constructed between 1881 and 1924. The district expanded by 11 acres (4.5 ha) in 1998 to encompass 50 contributing and 22 non-contributing properties and pushed the western and eastern boundaries out to Mount Rushmore Road and 5th Street, respectively. The years of significance were also increased to between 1876 and 1948.

The district was again surveyed in 2017, which updated its total contributing properties to 47 and non-contributing properties to 21. It also removed several noncontributing properties included in the 1998 boundary increase.

On the corners of many intersections in the district, there are bronze statues of U.S. Presidents. These are part of a Rapid City art exhibit known as the City of Presidents.

=== Architecture ===
The buildings in the Rapid City Historic Commercial District represent a broad range of purposes and architectural styles. Most properties historically served—and continue to serve—a commercial purpose, but some have been used for governmental, civic, agricultural, industrial, or entertainment functions. The first buildings were typically first constructed out of timber frames before later being replaced by more permanent stone and brick structures. Between 1880 and 1900, non-wooden buildings were usually done in the Renaissance Revival, Italianate, Romanesque Revival, and Queen Anne architectural styles. After the turn of the 20th century, fashions gave way to Neoclassical, Beaux Arts, Chicago School, and American Craftsman. Buildings from the interwar period favored more utilitarian Art Deco, International, or Moderne architecture styles. Buildings from any era might display eclectic or vernacular features.

== History ==
As white American settlers moved west into the Black Hills in the 1870s, entrepreneurs began looking to build settlements that would serve as hubs of commerce and transport. Rapid City was founded in 1876 on the banks of Rapid Creek, today located a few blocks north of the modern historic district. The arrival of railroads over the next two decades caused a population boom and created a rapidly growing economy. Banks, grocers, lawyers, pharmacies, and many other retail and commercial ventures started up in the downtown core to meet the needs of the growing population. Other properties served as hotels, lodges, or apartments. As the county seat, Rapid City also required multiple government and civic buildings; the first city hall was located at 616 6th Street. The old fire hall also served as a police headquarters; today it is a restaurant, the theming of which calls back to its firehouse roots.

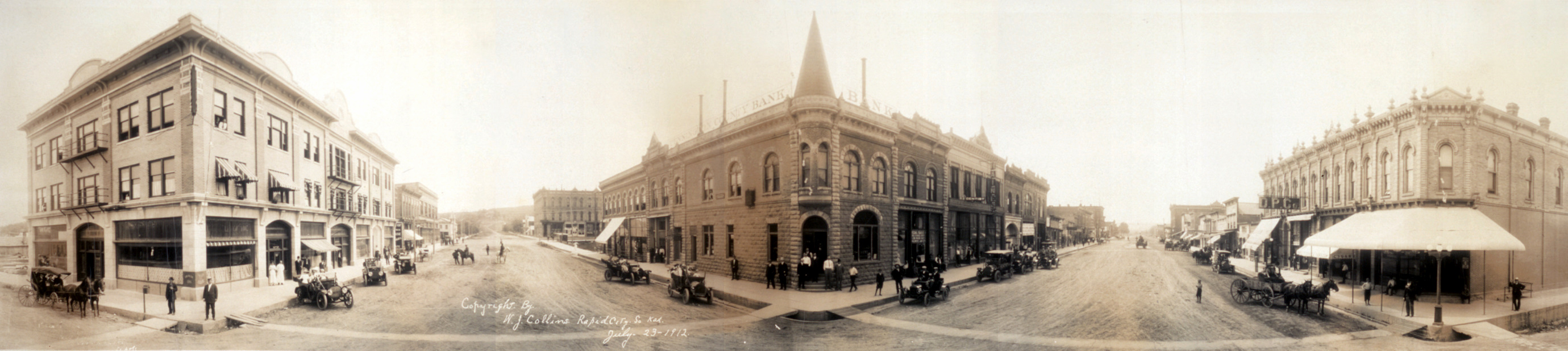
6th and Main Streets, 1911. 506 6th on left (non-contributing); 601 Main in center (demolished); and 606 Main (Clower Building) on right.

== Contributing properties ==
=== Significant contributing properties ===
==== Hotel Alex Johnson ====
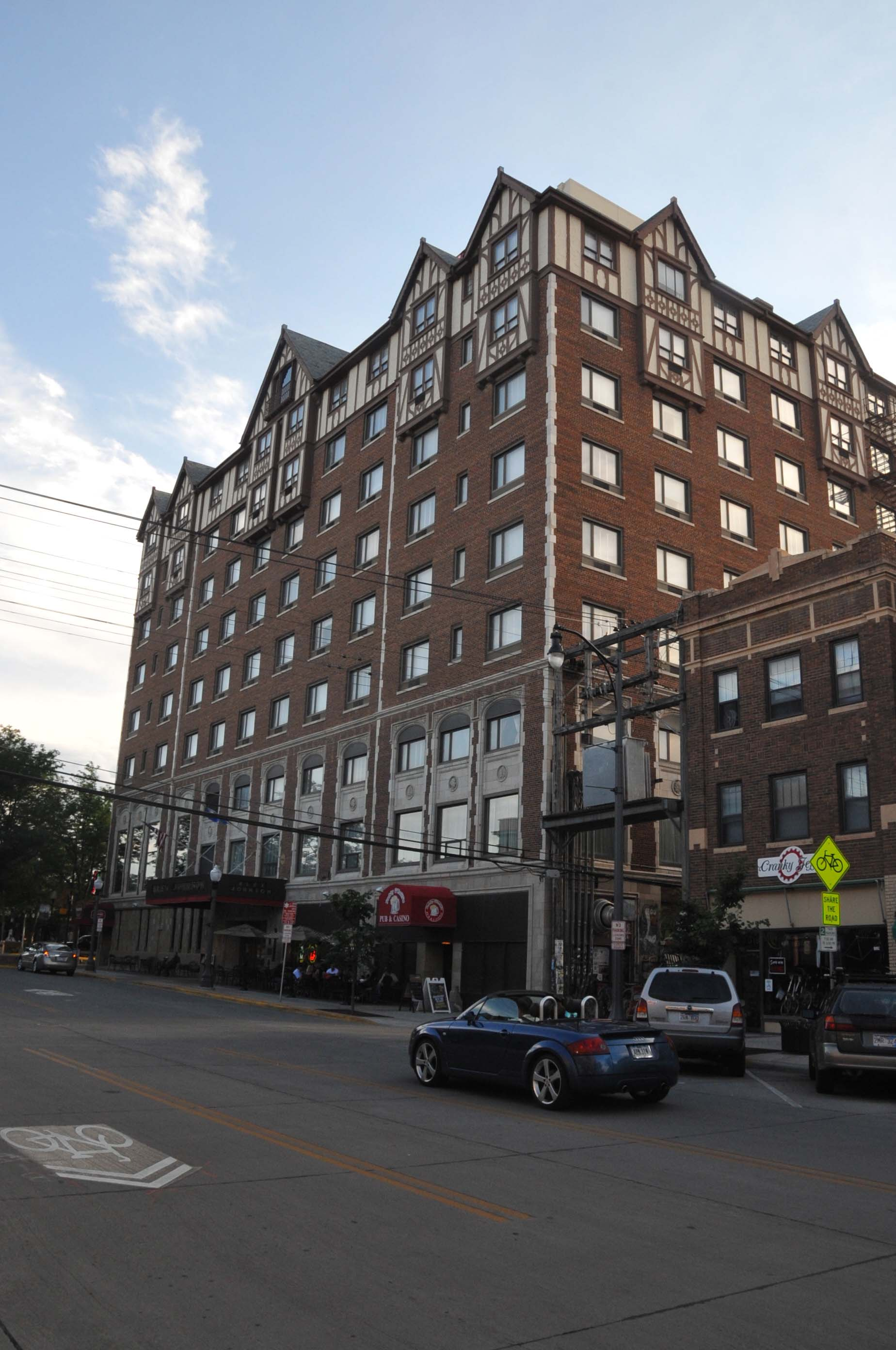
Hotel Alex Johnson

The Hotel Alex Johnson is a centerpiece contributing property to the district. The eight-story hotel was one of the tallest buildings in the state when constructed in 1927.

==== Buell Building ====
Located at 630 Saint Joseph Street, The Buell Building was finished in 1888 by the Lakota Banking & Investment Co. Its namesake, Charles Buell, purchased it in 1901 to establish his law offices. It was further expanded in 1925 to its present size. The Buell Building is considered one of the best examples of architecture in the district. Much of the original building has been preserved, although renovations on the first floor have replaced much of the original brick and windows. Most notably, the building features an oriel window topped with an onion dome inspired by architecture in Eastern Europe. The rest of its architecture is classed as an eclectic mix of Italianate, Romanesque Revival, and Queen Anne.

==== Windsor Block ====
This trio of buildings at 625, 627, and 629 St. Joseph Street, called the Windor Block, was created by businessman Robert Flormann in 1886. All three buildings are mostly identical and reflect Italianate and Commercial architectural styles. They would eventually become the Donaldson's Store, Rapid City's first department store and a core of its retail infrastructure. In the 1950s, the block was broken up into three separate compartments for retail space. Only 625 was included in the original listing; the other two addresses were ineligible due to remodeling works that had obscured much of the front facades. The original style was restored in the late 2000s and early 2010s and the last two addresses were subsequently added to the listing.

==== Elks Building ====
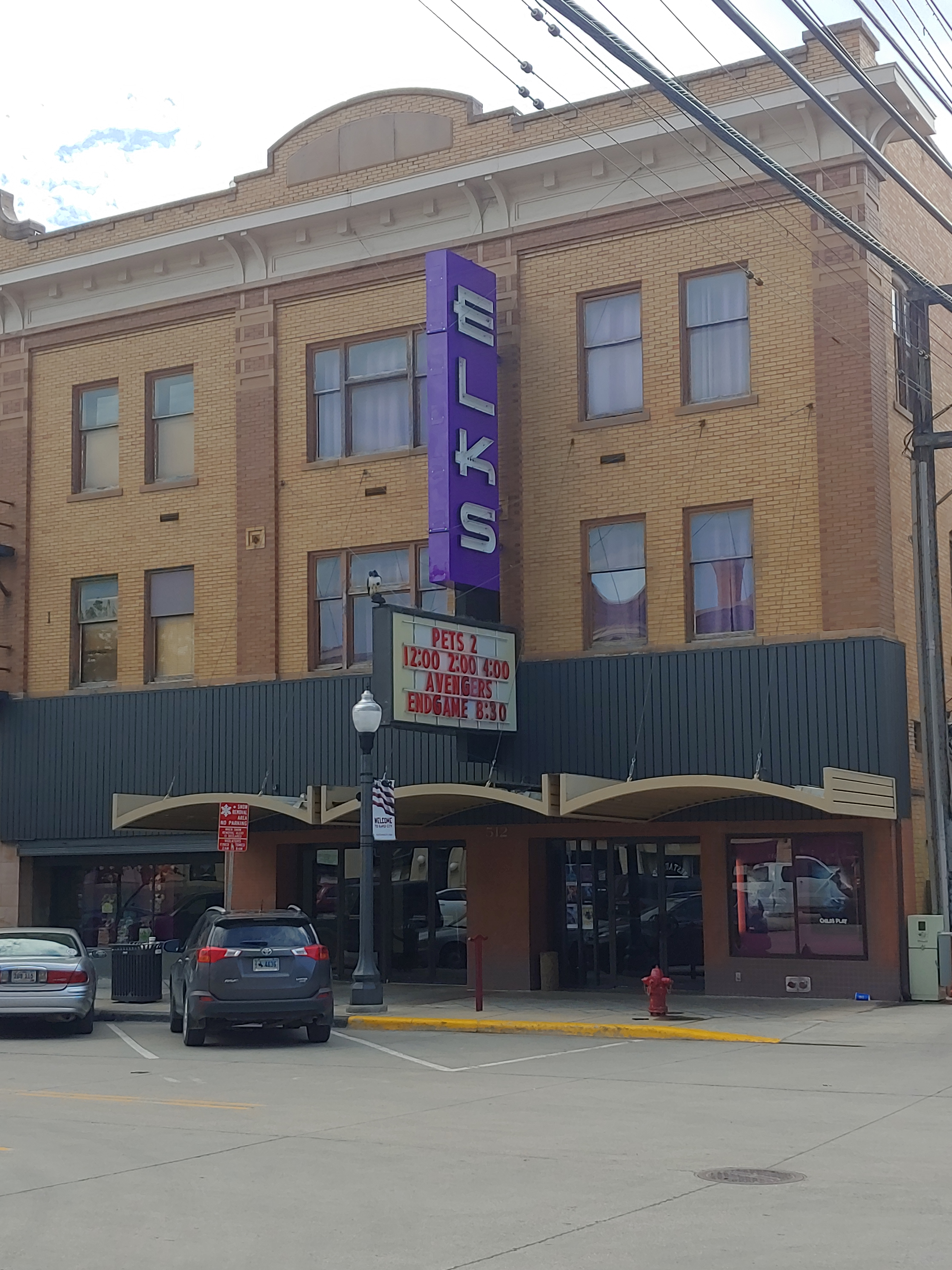
Elks Building

The Elks Building, located at 512 6th Street, was designed by J.P. Eisentraut in 1911 for use as a meetinghouse by the Benevolent and Protective Order of Elks. The opening ceremony was held on August 30, 1911. The Elks also built a theater inside, which opened on June 6, 1912, with a showing of "The Flirting Princess"; this also led to the building itself being referred to as the Elks Theatre, by which name it is still known today. Later, it hosted various businesses, including the United National Bank and the Bible and Book Store on its ground floor. The Elks sold it to a private developer in 1972, who continued to use it as a social club. Today, it still operates as a theater.

It was included in the historic district's initial establishment in 1974. It is a three-story brick structure, and is both Neoclassical and Spanish Colonial Revival in style, although the windows are Chicago School-based.

==== Italianate Trio ====
This block of three Italianate-style buildings on St. Joseph Street was built in 1886. The three buildings are the Lambert and Frease Building, at 608–610 St. Joseph; the Flormann Building at 612–614 St. Joseph; and 616–618 St. Joseph. Like the Windsor Block, these buildings are all identical.

=== Other contributing properties ===
Properties below are listed in a clockwise direction, beginning at the intersection of Main and 5th Streets in the northeast corner of the district.

Address	Historic Name	Image	Year Built	Added	Style	Description
406 5th			1936	July 9, 1998	Utilitarian, Colonial Revival	Five contributing buildings, all built between 1911 and 1944, consisting of a shed, warehouse, grain elevator, offices, and a retail block; a sixth non-contributing building was finished in 1973.
412 5th			1939	July 9, 1998	Vernacular	
430 Main	Gambles		1947	July 9, 1998	Utilitarian, Art Deco	
510 St. Joseph	Salvation Army		1931	July 9, 1998	Commercial	
522–530 6th	Duhamel Building		1908	July 9, 1998	Chicago School	Founded by Peter Duhamel for use as Rapid City's first department store
518 6th			1904	July 9, 1998	Italianate	
516 6th			1889	July 9, 1998	Italianate	
616 6th	City Hall		1903	July 9, 1998	Colonial Revival	Rapid City's first city hall building, which also hosted its fire and police departments.
609 St. Joseph	Hall Building		1884, 1930s	October 1, 1974	Art Deco	
619 St. Joseph	Bennett Building		1918	October 1, 1974	Commercial, Arts and Crafts	
623 St. Joseph	Hall Building		1886	October 1, 1974	Italianate	Now the Black Hills Beauty College
704 St. Joseph	Security Building		1929	October 1, 1974	Commercial, Art Deco	
515–517 7th			1905	October 1, 1974	Romanesque Revival	
517–519 7th	Security Savings Bank		1907	October 1, 1974	Romanesque Revival	
710 St. Joseph	Bennett Building Addition		1929	July 9, 1998	Utilitarian	
725 St. Joseph			1918	July 9, 1998	Utilitarian	
731 St. Joseph	Federal Building		1912	July 9, 1998	Neoclassical, Beaux Arts	
801 St. Joseph	Art Rose Building		1930	July 9, 1998	Commercial	
802–808 St. Joseph	Rapid City Business College		1919	July 9, 1998	Art Deco	
814–816 St. Joseph	Hill Apartments		1918	July 9, 1998	American Craftsman	
507 7th			1886	October 1, 1974		
631 Main	First National Bank		1915	October 1, 1974	Neoclassical	
619 Main	Rise Building		1926	October 1, 1974	Commercial, Chicago School	
616–622 Main			1926	October 1, 1974	Vernacular, Utilitarian, Revival	
617 Main			1930	October 1, 1974	Chicago School, Commercial	
615 Main	McNamara Brothers Building		1914	October 1, 1974	Commercial, Neoclassical	
613 Main			1891, 1930s	October 1, 1974	Art Deco	
611 Main			1891	October 1, 1974	Romanesque Revival	
610–612 Main	Rapid City Fire Hall		1915	October 1, 1974	Chicago School	Now the Firehouse Brewing Company. Designed by W.W. Beach and Co.
609 Main	Coolidge Brothers Building		1886	March 20, 1997	Romanesque Revival	
606 Main	Clower Building, Evans–Poznonsky–Morris Block		1886	October 1, 1974	Italianate	Originally served as Clower's Saloon.
605–607 Main	Penny–Haines Building		1915	March 20, 1997	Commercial	Designed by H. E. Waldron
507 6th	Haines Block		1918	October 1, 1974	Utilitarian, Art Deco	
602 Main			1898–1900	October 1, 1974	Italianate	
401–413 6th	Chicago Northwestern Railway Warehouse		1932	July 9, 1998	Utilitarian	
601 Main	Pennington County Bank		1915	October 1, 1974	Neoclassical	
523 Main			1930	July 9, 1998	Utilitarian	
521 Main			1930	July 9, 1998	Utilitarian	
513–519 Main			1925	July 9, 1998	Utilitarian	
508 Main			1906	July 9, 1998	Italianate	
