= Wasta, South Dakota =

Wasta, South Dakota Wašté
- Town
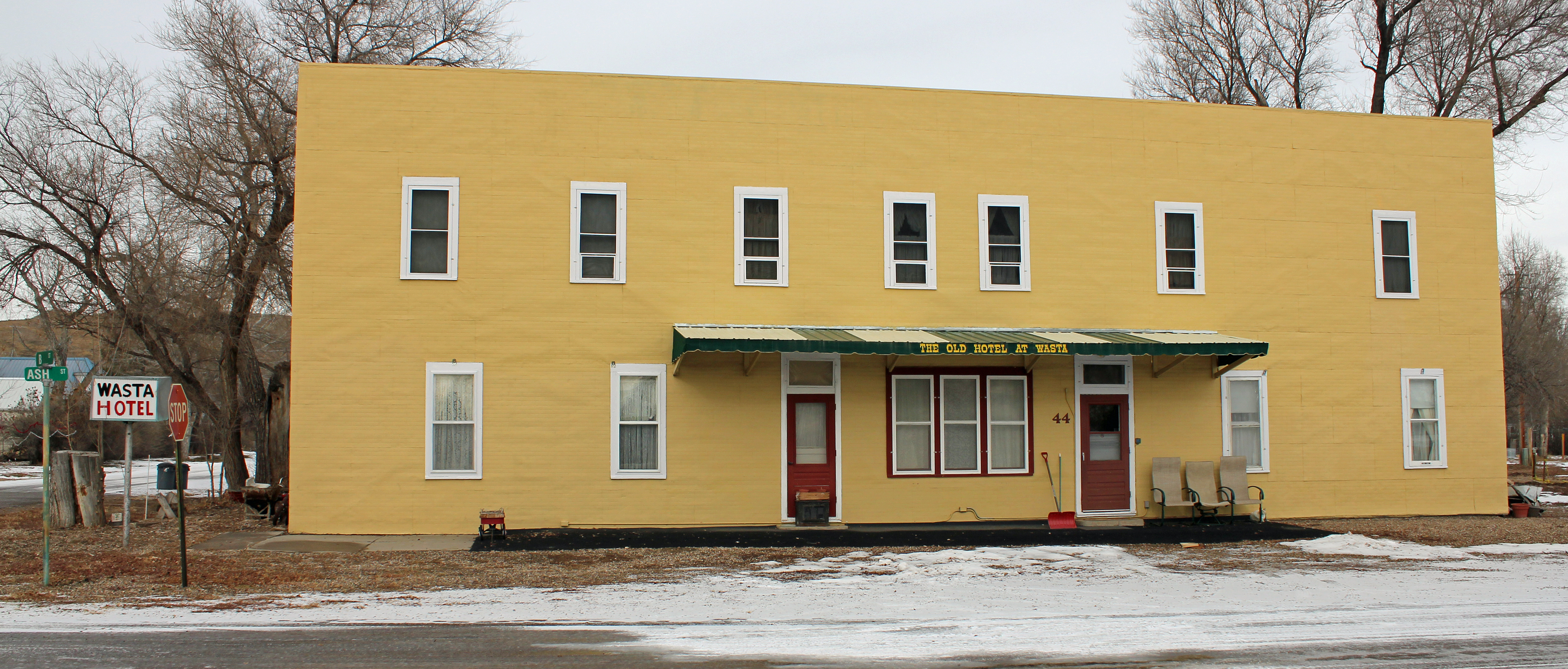
- The Wasta Hotel, located at Ash and B streets in Wasta. It is listed on the National Register of Historic Places

- Location in Pennington County and the state of South Dakota
- Coordinates: 44°04′10″N 102°26′47″W
- Country: United States
- State: South Dakota
- County: Pennington
- Incorporated: 1930

Area
  - Total: 0.19 sq mi (0.50 km^{2})
  - Land: 0.19 sq mi (0.50 km^{2})
  - Water: 0 sq mi (0.00 km^{2})
- Elevation: 2,323 ft (708 m)

Population (2020)
  - Total: 65
  - Density: 338.8/sq mi (130.83/km^{2})
- Time zone: UTC-7 (Mountain (MST))
  - Summer (DST): UTC-6 (MDT)
- ZIP codes: 57767, 57791
- Area code: 605
- FIPS code: 46-69140
- GNIS feature ID: 1267626

Wasta (Lakota: Wašté) is a town in Pennington County, South Dakota, United States, situated along the Cheyenne River. It had a population of 65 at the 2020 census.

== History ==
A post office called Wasta has been in operation since 1907. Wasta is a name derived from the Lakota word "wašté", meaning "good".

== Geography ==
Wasta sits along Interstate 90 in the western part of South Dakota.

According to the United States Census Bureau, the town has a total area of 0.19 square miles (0.49 km^{2}), all land.

=== Climate ===
Climate data for Wasta, South Dakota (1991–2020 normals, extremes 1949–present)
Month	Jan	Feb	Mar	Apr	May	Jun	Jul	Aug	Sep	Oct	Nov	Dec	Year
Record high °F (°C)	78 (26)	77 (25)	86 (30)	97 (36)	102 (39)	111 (44)	111 (44)	109 (43)	107 (42)	98 (37)	86 (30)	72 (22)	111 (44)
Mean maximum °F (°C)	59.3 (15.2)	63.3 (17.4)	76.7 (24.8)	84.6 (29.2)	90.2 (32.3)	97.9 (36.6)	101.6 (38.7)	101.9 (38.8)	99.4 (37.4)	87.2 (30.7)	73.1 (22.8)	60.3 (15.7)	104.0 (40.0)
Mean daily maximum °F (°C)	35.1 (1.7)	39.0 (3.9)	50.2 (10.1)	60.1 (15.6)	69.7 (20.9)	80.4 (26.9)	89.0 (31.7)	88.3 (31.3)	79.1 (26.2)	63.1 (17.3)	49.0 (9.4)	37.4 (3.0)	61.7 (16.5)
Daily mean °F (°C)	22.2 (−5.4)	25.8 (−3.4)	36.2 (2.3)	46.3 (7.9)	56.6 (13.7)	67.2 (19.6)	74.6 (23.7)	73.2 (22.9)	63.2 (17.3)	48.4 (9.1)	35.0 (1.7)	24.6 (−4.1)	47.8 (8.8)
Mean daily minimum °F (°C)	9.4 (−12.6)	12.6 (−10.8)	22.2 (−5.4)	32.6 (0.3)	43.5 (6.4)	53.9 (12.2)	60.1 (15.6)	58.0 (14.4)	47.3 (8.5)	33.6 (0.9)	21.0 (−6.1)	11.7 (−11.3)	33.8 (1.0)
Mean minimum °F (°C)	−14.7 (−25.9)	−11.4 (−24.1)	0.3 (−17.6)	15.4 (−9.2)	28.7 (−1.8)	40.9 (4.9)	48.2 (9.0)	44.8 (7.1)	31.4 (−0.3)	14.0 (−10.0)	0.6 (−17.4)	−10.6 (−23.7)	−21.6 (−29.8)
Record low °F (°C)	−33 (−36)	−38 (−39)	−29 (−34)	5 (−15)	15 (−9)	32 (0)	38 (3)	35 (2)	19 (−7)	−10 (−23)	−25 (−32)	−33 (−36)	−38 (−39)
Average precipitation inches (mm)	0.28 (7.1)	0.53 (13)	0.87 (22)	1.90 (48)	3.55 (90)	2.73 (69)	2.32 (59)	1.56 (40)	1.19 (30)	1.76 (45)	0.64 (16)	0.32 (8.1)	17.65 (448)
Average snowfall inches (cm)	3.8 (9.7)	6.4 (16)	5.5 (14)	3.7 (9.4)	0.1 (0.25)	0.0 (0.0)	0.0 (0.0)	0.0 (0.0)	0.0 (0.0)	1.1 (2.8)	4.2 (11)	5.6 (14)	30.4 (77)
Average precipitation days (≥ 0.01 in)	2.8	3.4	3.7	6.8	8.7	9.1	6.7	5.5	4.4	5.2	2.8	2.8	61.9
Average snowy days (≥ 0.1 in)	2.4	2.8	2.0	1.3	0.0	0.0	0.0	0.0	0.0	0.4	1.6	2.7	13.2
Source: NOAA

== Demographics ==
Historical population
Census	Pop.	Note	%±
1940	153		—
1950	144		−5.9%
1960	196		36.1%
1970	127		−35.2%
1980	99		−22.0%
1990	82		−17.2%
2000	75		−8.5%
2010	80		6.7%
2020	65		−18.7%
U.S. Decennial Census

=== 2010 census ===
As of the census of 2010, there were 80 people, 36 households, and 20 families living in the town. The population density was 421.1 inhabitants per square mile (162.6/km^{2}). There were 46 housing units at an average density of 242.1 per square mile (93.5/km^{2}). The racial makeup of the town was 100.0% White. Hispanic or Latino of any race were 1.3% of the population.

There were 36 households, of which 25.0% had children under the age of 18 living with them, 44.4% were married couples living together, 11.1% had a female householder with no husband present, and 44.4% were non-families. 33.3% of all households were made up of individuals, and 11.1% had someone living alone who was 65 years of age or older. The average household size was 2.22 and the average family size was 2.90.

The median age in the town was 40.5 years. 22.5% of residents were under the age of 18; 11.3% were between the ages of 18 and 24; 22.6% were from 25 to 44; 22.6% were from 45 to 64; and 21.3% were 65 years of age or older. The gender makeup of the town was 52.5% male and 47.5% female.

=== 2000 census ===
As of the census of 2000, there were 75 people, 35 households, and 19 families living in the town. The population density was 390.7 inhabitants per square mile (150.9/km^{2}). There were 46 housing units at an average density of 239.6 per square mile (92.5/km^{2}). The racial makeup of the town was 98.67% White and 1.33% Asian. Hispanic or Latino of any race were 1.33% of the population.

There were 35 households, out of which 25.7% had children under the age of 18 living with them, 42.9% were married couples living together, 2.9% had a female householder with no husband present, and 45.7% were non-families. 37.1% of all households were made up of individuals, and 17.1% had someone living alone who was 65 years of age or older. The average household size was 2.14 and the average family size was 2.63.

In the town, the population was spread out, with 22.7% under the age of 18, 5.3% from 18 to 24, 28.0% from 25 to 44, 21.3% from 45 to 64, and 22.7% who were 65 years of age or older. The median age was 38 years. For every 100 females, there were 108.3 males. For every 100 females age 18 and over, there were 123.1 males.

The median income for a household in the town was $26,375, and the median income for a family was $26,250. Males had a median income of $30,000 versus $25,000 for females. The per capita income for the town was $13,888. There were 17.6% of families and 15.7% of the population living below the poverty line, including 38.1% of under eighteens and none of those over 64.

== Education ==
The school district is Wall School District 51-5.

== In popular culture ==
The Redwood Motel in Wasta was used extensively as a filming site for the movie Thunderheart.
