= James Cassidy House =

Historic house in Utah, United States

- U.S. National Register of Historic Places
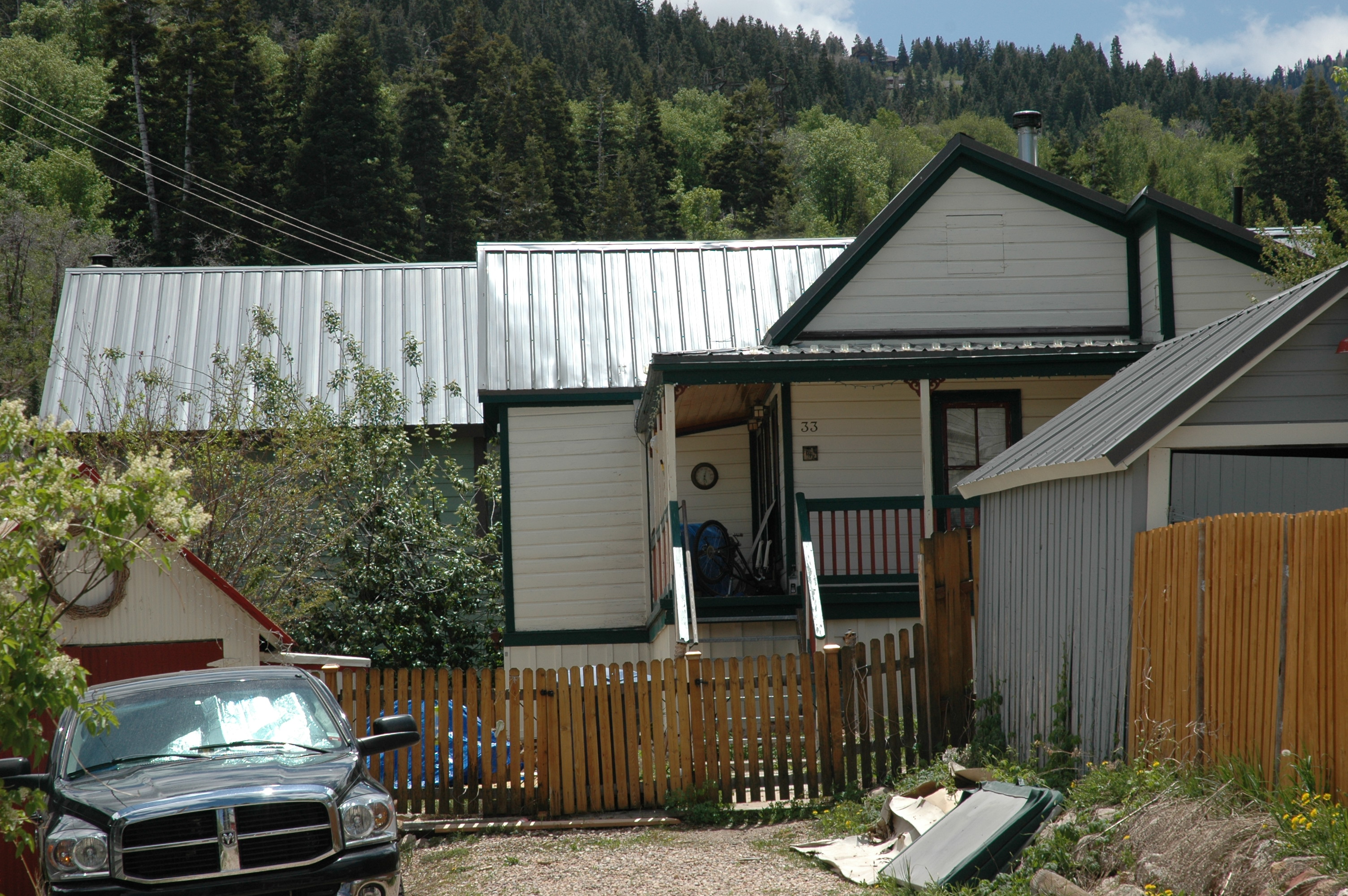

- Location within Utah Location within the United States
- Location: 33 King Rd., Park City, Utah
- Coordinates: 40°38′22″N 111°29′39″W
- Area: less than one acre
- Built: c. 1880
- MPS: Mining Boom Era Houses TR
- NRHP reference No.: 84002245
- Added to NRHP: July 11, 1984

The James Cassidy House, located at 33 King Rd. in Park City, Utah, was built c. 1880. It was listed on the National Register of Historic Places in 1984.

It was deemed significant as an example of the T/L cottage style, and may have been a T/L cottage formed by an addition. The T/L cottage by addition "resulted from the addition of a cross-wing to an existing hall and parlor house"; the style was "the most common and acceptable" way to enlarge Park City homes, and represents an important construction trend in the city.
