= Quinn, South Dakota =

- Town
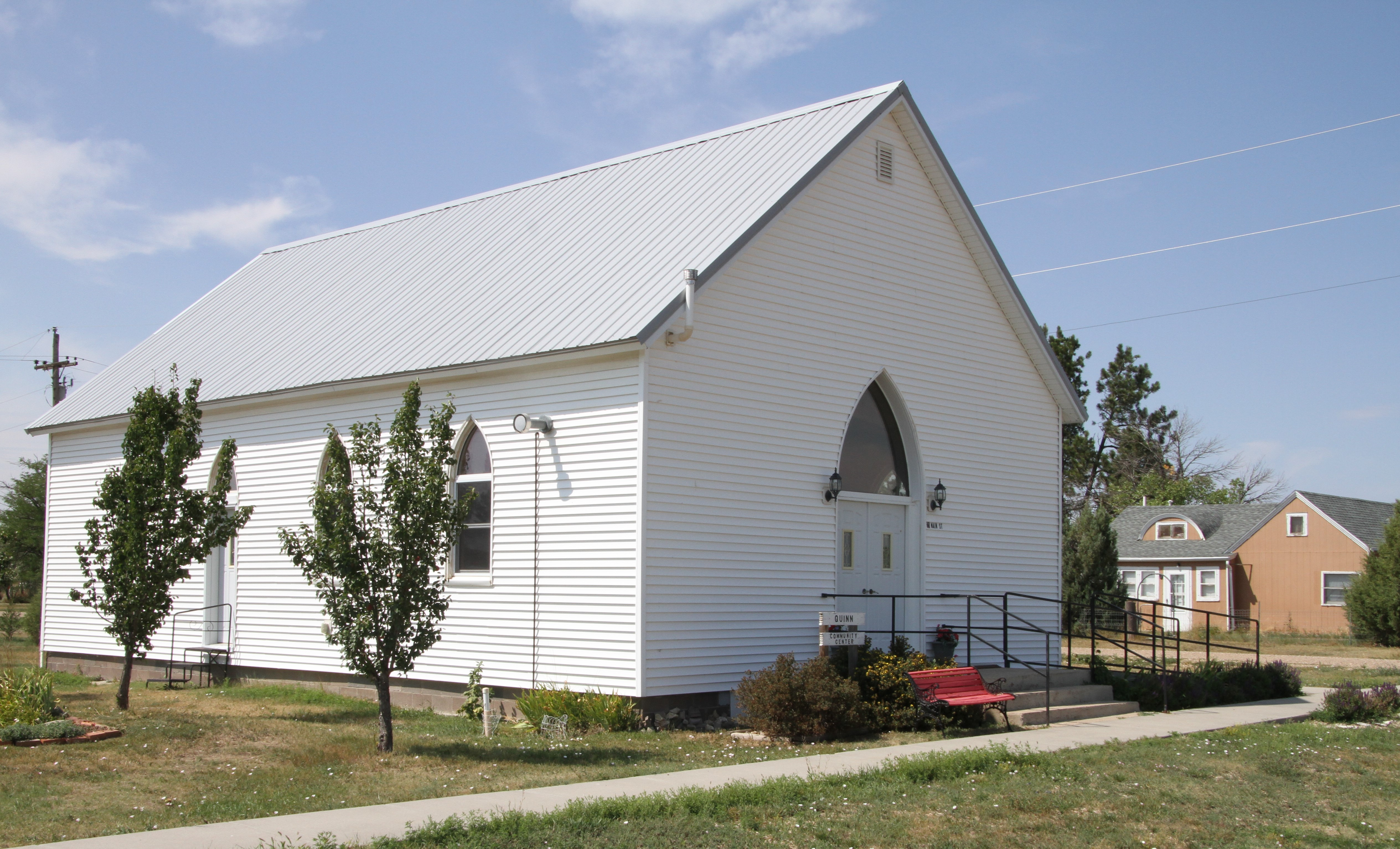
- Quinn Community Center in 2017

- Location in Pennington County and the state of South Dakota
- Coordinates: 43°59′11″N 102°07′35″W
- Country: United States
- State: South Dakota
- County: Pennington
- Founded: 1907
- Incorporated: 1920

Area
  - Total: 1.20 sq mi (3.11 km^{2})
  - Land: 1.20 sq mi (3.11 km^{2})
  - Water: 0 sq mi (0.00 km^{2})
- Elevation: 2,612 ft (796 m)

Population (2020)
  - Total: 63
  - Density: 52.5/sq mi (20.27/km^{2})
- Time zone: UTC-7 (Mountain (MST))
  - Summer (DST): UTC-6 (MDT)
- ZIP code: 57775
- Area code: 605
- FIPS code: 46-52500
- GNIS feature ID: 1267541

Quinn is a town on U.S. Route 14 in Pennington County, South Dakota, United States. The population was 63 at the 2020 census. Asteroid 107561 Quinn is named for the town, which is the home of the Badlands Observatory, located in the former community hospital.

== History ==
Quinn was laid out in 1907. The town was named for Michael Quinn, a local rancher. A post office called Quinn has been in operation since 1907. Quinn Methodist Church is on the National Register of Historic Places.

== Geography ==
According to the United States Census Bureau, the town has a total area of 1.16 square miles (3.00 km^{2}), all land.

=== Climate ===
Climate data for Quinn, SD
Month	Jan	Feb	Mar	Apr	May	Jun	Jul	Aug	Sep	Oct	Nov	Dec	Year
Record high °F (°C)	73 (23)	75 (24)	88 (31)	95 (35)	105 (41)	114 (46)	117 (47)	113 (45)	108 (42)	98 (37)	85 (29)	77 (25)	117 (47)
Mean daily maximum °F (°C)	35 (2)	39 (4)	48 (9)	60 (16)	70 (21)	80 (27)	90 (32)	89 (32)	78 (26)	64 (18)	48 (9)	36 (2)	90 (32)
Daily mean °F (°C)	22 (−6)	26 (−3)	35 (2)	45 (7)	56 (13)	66 (19)	75 (24)	73 (23)	61 (16)	48 (9)	34 (1)	23 (−5)	47 (8)
Mean daily minimum °F (°C)	9 (−13)	12 (−11)	21 (−6)	30 (−1)	42 (6)	52 (11)	59 (15)	56 (13)	44 (7)	31 (−1)	19 (−7)	9 (−13)	32 (0)
Record low °F (°C)	−42 (−41)	−41 (−41)	−33 (−36)	−12 (−24)	13 (−11)	30 (−1)	34 (1)	27 (−3)	10 (−12)	−7 (−22)	−29 (−34)	−41 (−41)	−42 (−41)
Average precipitation inches (mm)	0.37 (9.4)	0.60 (15)	1.18 (30)	1.70 (43)	2.83 (72)	2.98 (76)	2.22 (56)	1.46 (37)	1.32 (34)	1.36 (35)	0.64 (16)	0.38 (9.7)	17.04 (433.1)
Source: The Weather Channel

== Demographics ==
Historical population
Census	Pop.	Note	%±
1930	141		—
1940	189		34.0%
1950	214		13.2%
1960	162		−24.3%
1970	105		−35.2%
1980	80		−23.8%
1990	72		−10.0%
2000	44		−38.9%
2010	54		22.7%
2020	63		16.7%
U.S. Decennial Census

=== 2010 census ===
As of the census of 2010, there were 54 people, 23 households, and 14 families living in the town. The population density was 46.6 inhabitants per square mile (18.0/km^{2}). There were 27 housing units at an average density of 23.3 per square mile (9.0/km^{2}). The racial makeup of the town was 85.2% White, 7.4% Native American, 1.9% Asian, 1.9% from other races, and 3.7% from two or more races. Hispanic or Latino of any race were 1.9% of the population.

There were 23 households, of which 30.4% had children under the age of 18 living with them, 47.8% were married couples living together, 8.7% had a female householder with no husband present, 4.3% had a male householder with no wife present, and 39.1% were non-families. 30.4% of all households were made up of individuals, and 21.7% had someone living alone who was 65 years of age or older. The average household size was 2.35 and the average family size was 3.07.

The median age in the town was 41.5 years. 25.9% of residents were under the age of 18; 5.7% were between the ages of 18 and 24; 24.1% were from 25 to 44; 31.5% were from 45 to 64; and 13% were 65 years of age or older. The gender makeup of the town was 57.4% male and 42.6% female.

=== 2000 census ===
As of the census of 2000, there were 44 people, 18 households, and 10 families living in the town. The population density was 45.9 inhabitants per square mile (17.7/km^{2}). There were 23 housing units at an average density of 24.0 per square mile (9.3/km^{2}). The racial makeup of the town was 93.18% White and 6.82% Native American.

There were 18 households, out of which 44.4% had children under the age of 18 living with them, 61.1% were married couples living together, and 38.9% were non-families. 38.9% of all households were made up of individuals, and 22.2% had someone living alone who was 65 years of age or older. The average household size was 2.44 and the average family size was 3.36.

In the town, the population was spread out, with 34.1% under the age of 18, 29.5% from 25 to 44, 25.0% from 45 to 64, and 11.4% who were 65 years of age or older. The median age was 35 years. For every 100 females, there were 69.2 males. For every 100 females age 18 and over, there were 93.3 males.

The median income for a household in the town was $40,750, and the median income for a family was $41,750. Males had a median income of $28,750 versus $22,500 for females. The per capita income for the town was $13,119. None of the population or families were below the poverty line.
