= Quinn Methodist Church =

Historic church in South Dakota, United States

- U.S. National Register of Historic Places
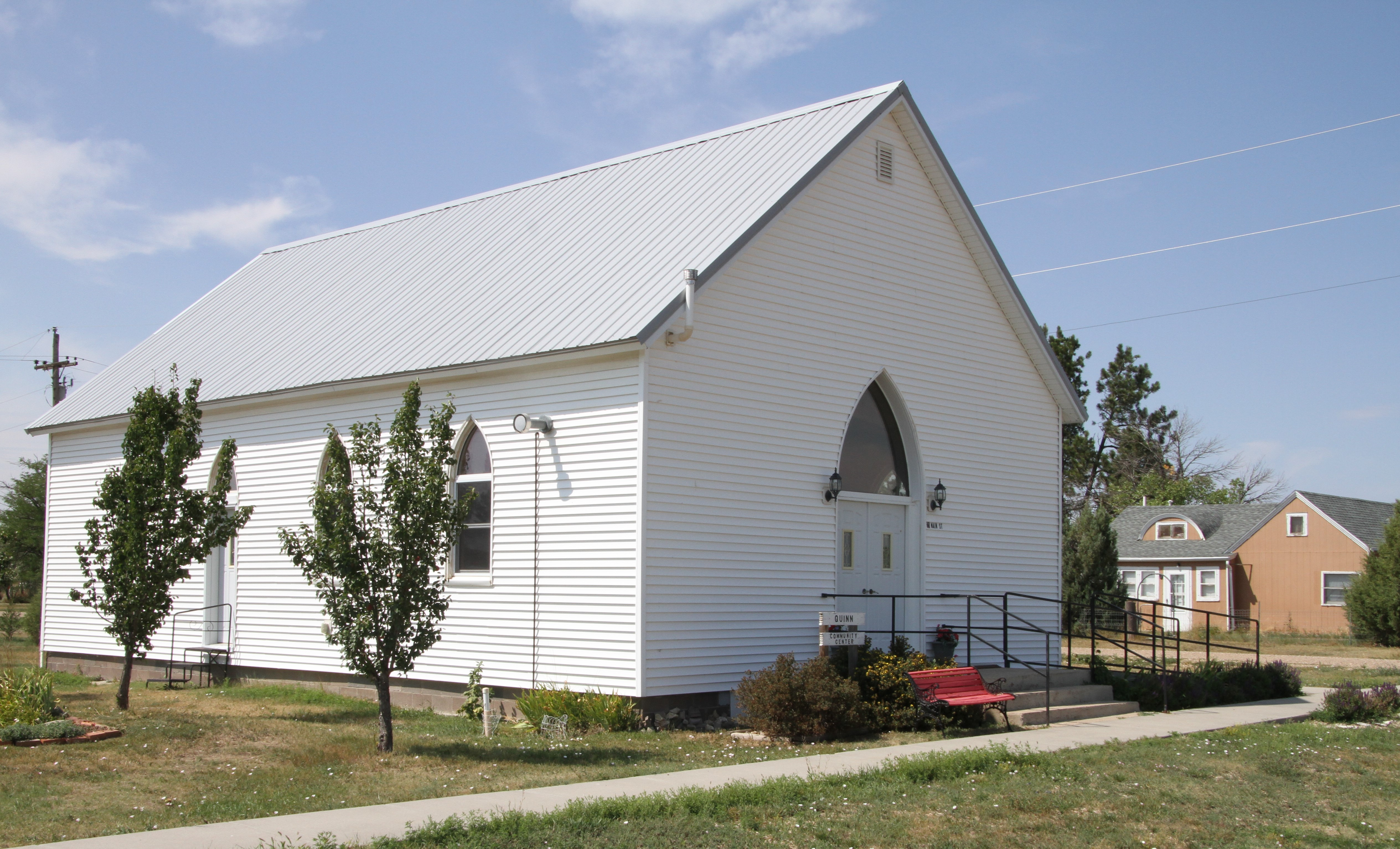
- The building in 2017

- Location within South Dakota Location within the United States
- Location: Elm and Main Streets, Quinn, South Dakota
- Coordinates: 43.98923°N 102.12813°W
- Area: 0 acres (0 ha)
- NRHP reference No.: 06001308
- Added to NRHP: January 23, 2007

Quinn Methodist Church is a historic church at the junction of Elm and Main Streets in Quinn, South Dakota. The Methodist church was built from 1908 to 1909 and the inside remodeled in 1961. As one of two churches in the small community, (the other being Roman Catholic) it also housed Lutheran services and a school.

The building was added to the National Register of Historic Places in 2007 and now serves as the Quinn Community Center.
