= Cassidy House (Bridgeport, Connecticut) =

Historic house in Connecticut, United States

- U.S. National Register of Historic Places
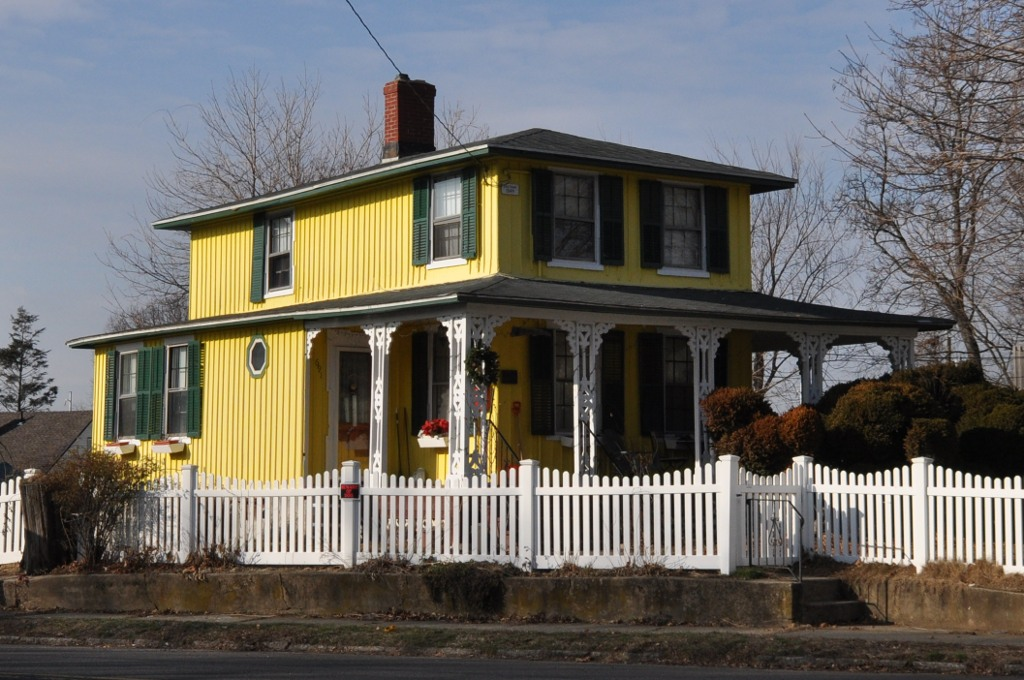

- Location within Connecticut Location within the United States
- Location: 691 Ellsworth Street, Bridgeport, Connecticut
- Coordinates: 41°9′48″N 73°13′26″W
- Area: less than one acre
- Built: 1849
- Built by: John Plumb
- Architectural style: Italianate
- NRHP reference No.: 11000749
- Added to NRHP: October 17, 2011

The Cassidy House is a historic house at 691 Ellsworth Street in Bridgeport, Connecticut. Built in 1849, it is a well-preserved example of early Italianate residential architecture, and the only documented building in the city from that period which retains its original board and batten siding. It was listed on the National Register of Historic Places in 2011.

== Description and history ==
The Cassidy House stands in a residential area in Bridgeport's western Black Rock neighborhood, at the northwest corner of Ellsworth Street and Crowther Avenue. It is two-story wood-frame structure, with a shallow pitch hip roof sporting broad boxed eaves, and a wraparound single-story porch. The porch supports are fine examples of period scrollwork and bracketing. The interior of the house retains many original period features, including flooring, fireplaces, and trim. A number of the windows still have original glass, and many doors have original porcelain doorknobs.

The house was built in 1849 by John Plumb, and was the first house built north of Fairfield Avenue in this area, which was part of Fairfield until it was annexed by Bridgeport in 1870. The once-extensive property was subdivided for development in 1893, and the house was purchased in that year by Edward and Ellen Cassidy. It remained in the Cassidy family for 109 years. In a 1974 survey of Bridgeport's 19th-century residential architecture, it was one of two houses of the period that had its original board and batten siding; the other has subsequently been resided.

It remains a private residence as of 2025.

== See also ==
- National Register of Historic Places listings in Fairfield County, Connecticut
