= Rapid City Fruit Company =

- U.S. National Register of Historic Places
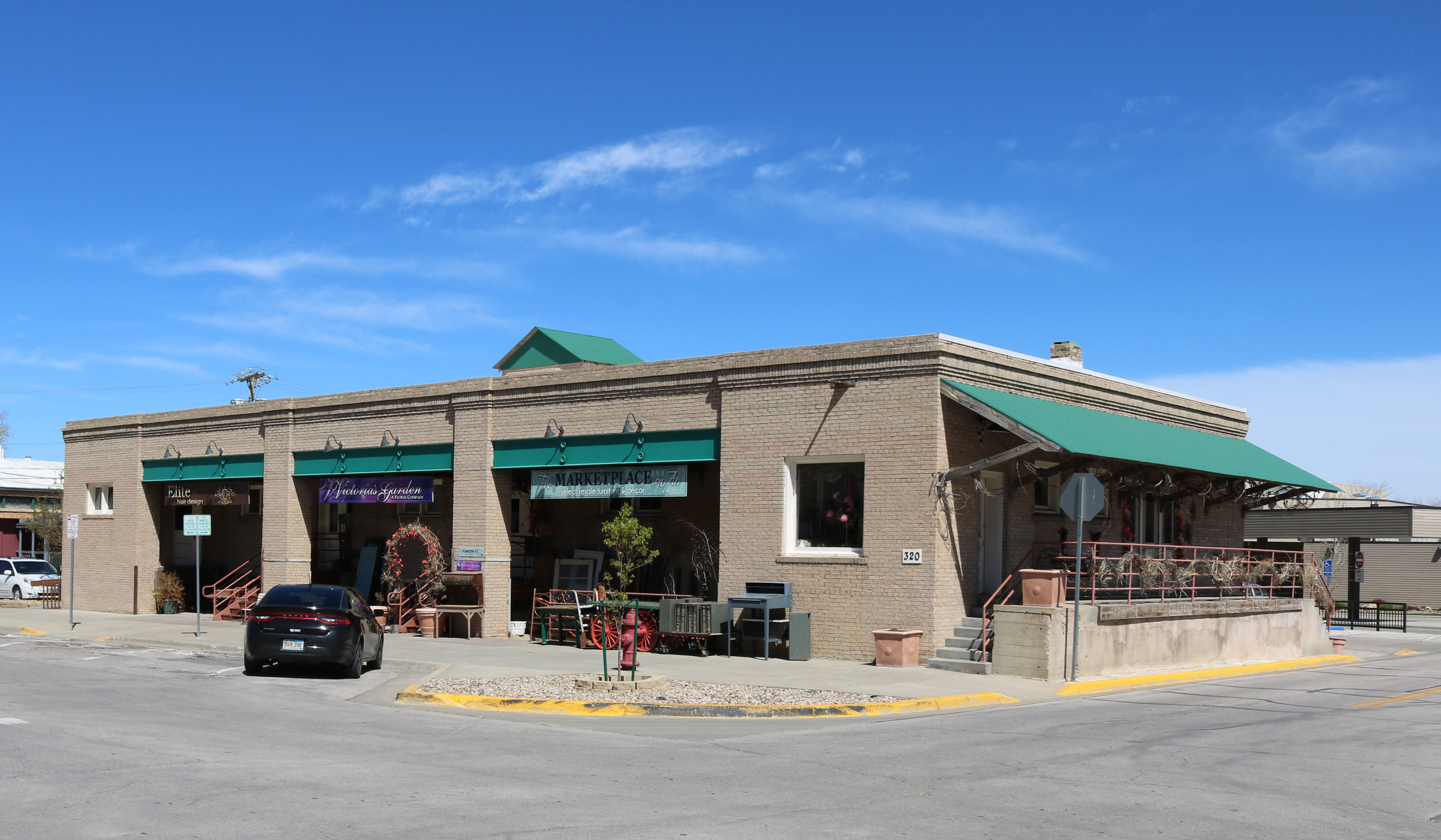
- Rapid City Fruit Company building in 2017

- Location within South Dakota Location within the United States
- Location: 320 7th St., Rapid City, South Dakota
- Coordinates: 44°05′30″N 103°13′39″W
- Area: less than one acre
- Built: 1920
- Built by: C. A. Nesbit, Claude E. Gray
- Architectural style: Early 20th-C. commercial
- NRHP reference No.: 93001340
- Added to NRHP: December 9, 1993

Rapid City Fruit Company is a historic commercial building at 320 7th Street in Rapid City, South Dakota. It was built in 1920 and was the first refrigerated warehouse in the city. It was listed on the National Register of Historic Places in 1993.

== History ==
The Rapid City Fruit Company was founded in 1920 by C. A. Nesbit and Claude E. Gray. Nesbit, a rancher from nearby Fairburn, sold his ranch to focus on the fruit business. Both Nesbit and Gray had also previously been grocers; Gray was then president of the Black Hills Wholesale Grocery. Incorporated in September 1920, its starting capital was $100,000. The building was completed and opened in May 1921 with Roy Wortman as its manager. Located in the warehouse district near the railroad, the company's building was a major regional produce distribution hub and was the first refrigerated cold storage building in Rapid City. Wortman resigned in 1923 and Clyde W. Stewart, a salesman with the Black Hills Wholesale Grocery, took over his role.

Even after the fruit company disbanded—the date of which is unknown due to lack of records, but is estimated to be 1935—the building itself was still used as a warehouse for several decades. From 1936 to 1960, it was a warehouse for a local tobacco company. Between 1962 and 1982, it served as a warehouse for the Barber Company and Black Hills Warehouse Inc.; for ten years after that, it housed wholesale businesses. Today, it is still used as a commercial building.

On December 9, 1993, the building was added to the National Register of Historic Places for its importance to the economic history of Rapid City, and for its well-preserved commercial architecture. A $5,800 grant allocated by the South Dakota State Historical Society from gambling profits in Deadwood funded minor restoration works in 1997.

== Architecture ==
The Rapid City Fruit Company building is a one-story rectangular building at the corner of 7th and Apolda Streets and faces south. It measures 98 by 50 feet (30 by 15 m) and includes a basement that was used as cold storage. The Portland cement bricks used to construct it were provided by a partnership between Rapid City Brick and Tile Company and Garland Construction. The main entrance is elevated above street level and accessed by two staircases. Two brick columns on the west face divide that side into three bays, which were originally used as docking areas and now separate the businesses that occupy the building. Above each bay is a green lintel decorated with rosette-shaped tie coverings. Windows are simple rectangular openings. Original plans left space for a second story to be added, but this was never carried out. Brickwork is also present inside, in the form of brick cornices along the western wall and crowning a central elevator shaft. This Otis Elevator was used to move produce between the lower cold storage and upper loading floors. When in use, the basement was filled with ice and insulated by sawdust. Upon its otherwise flat roof sits a cupola that houses the elevator mechanism. A lean-to was added to the eastern side of the building in the mid-20th century but had been removed by 1986.
