= Calumet Hotel (Wasta, South Dakota) =

- U.S. National Register of Historic Places
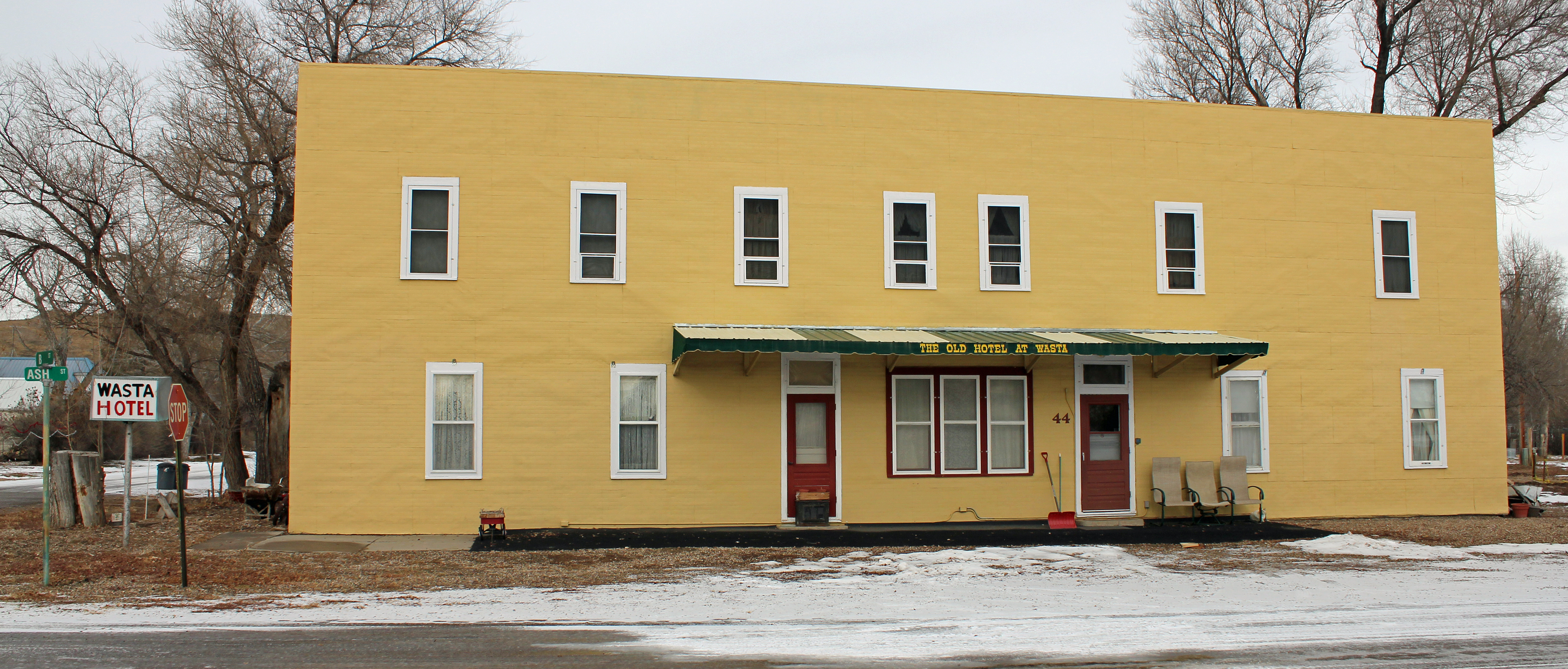
- A view of the hotel in late 2010.
- Location: Ash and B Ave., Wasta, South Dakota
- Coordinates: 44°4′4″N 102°26′47″W
- Built: 1908, 1920, 1922
- NRHP reference No.: 99001659
- Added to NRHP: January 7, 2000

The Calumet Hotel in Wasta, South Dakota, United States—also known as Wasta Hotel or the Wasta Hotel and Meat Market—was built in 1908. It was expanded in 1920 and 1922. It was listed on the National Register of Historic Places in 2000.

By 1999 it had had seven owners, and it had served as a restaurant, as a boarding house, as a meeting place, as a meat market, and as a hotel. After it ceased operation as a hotel it was still used as a vacation home for annual family reunions held in Wasta. It is the largest building in Wasta's former business district.
