= Rapid City Carnegie Library =

- U.S. National Register of Historic Places
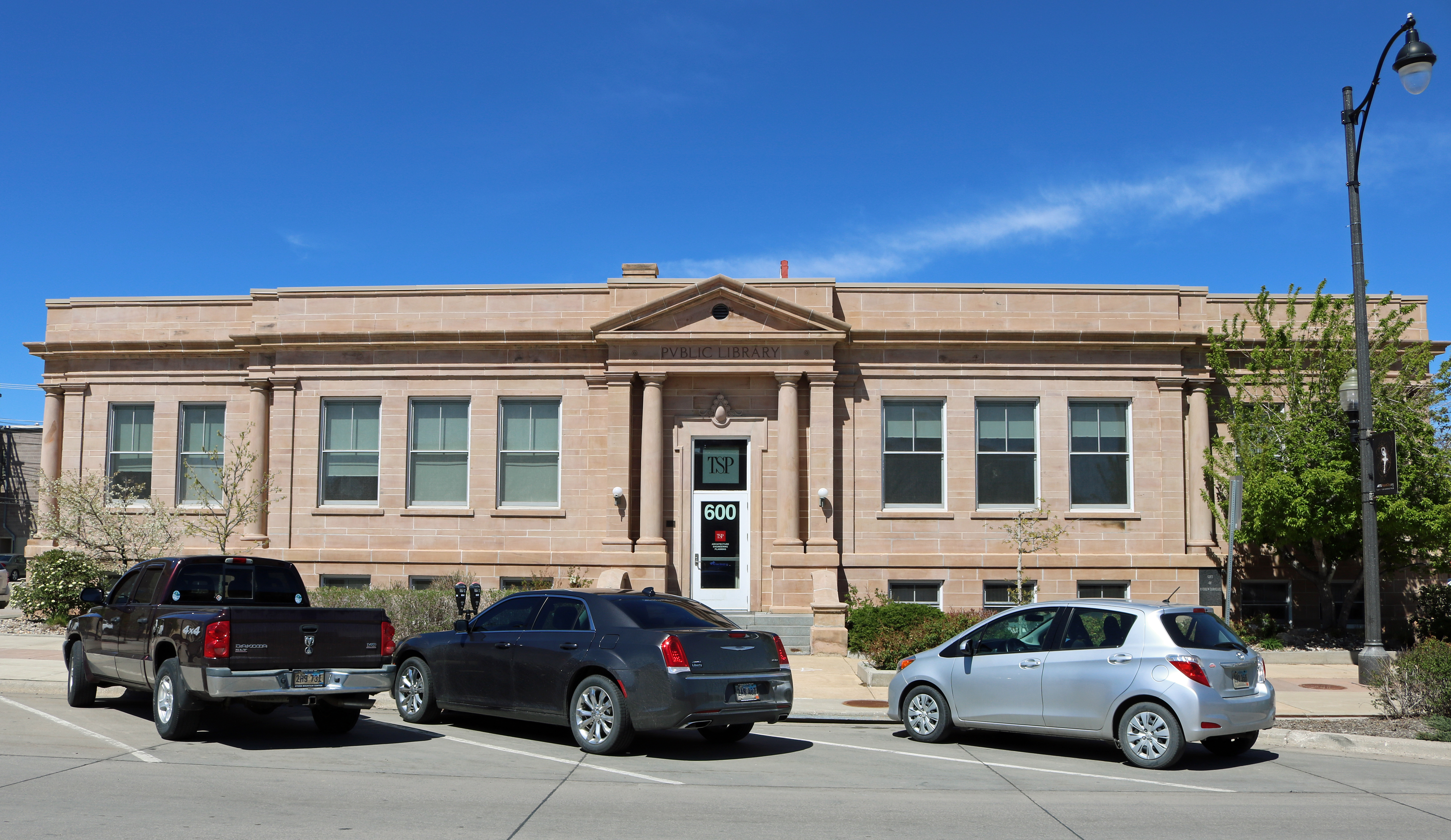
- Rapid City Carnegie Library in 2017

- Location within South Dakota Location within the United States
- Location: 604 Kansas City St., Rapid City, South Dakota
- Coordinates: 44°04′46″N 103°13′39″W
- Area: less than one acre
- Built: 1915
- Architect: H.E. Waldron
- NRHP reference No.: 81000578
- Added to NRHP: February 17, 1981

The Rapid City Carnegie Library is a historic Carnegie library building in Rapid City, South Dakota. It was listed on the National Register of Historic Places in 1981.

== History ==
Prior to the Carnegie library's construction, two other libraries had previously been built in Rapid City. Library Hall, the first public building in the city, was established in 1881. Although it initially flourished, interest dwindled by the beginning of the 20th century, and it saw increased usage as a public meetinghouse and theater. Eventually, the books were sent to South Dakota School of Mines and Technology. However, efforts to establish a library quickly redoubled; in 1904, a small organization established the Rapid City Free Library and a reading room in a corner the Flormann Building. The library struggled to keep a permanent home, however; in 1909 it relocated to the Todden Worth Building, and again in 1912 to the Elks Building.

In the early 20th century, Andrew Carnegie had founded the Carnegie Library Building Program to fund the construction of libraries across the United States. Keeping the Rapid City Free Library running for two years allowed the city to apply for a Carnegie grant. On March 11, 1914, the program awarded Rapid City a grant of $12,500 to build a new library; this was the 20th such library in South Dakota the program had funded since 1901. After a disagreement over the library's location that was settled by the South Dakota Supreme Court, it was decided Library Hall would be demolished and the Carnegie library built in its place. Construction continued through 1915. The library officially opened to the public on March 2, 1916, in an opening ceremony hosted by the board and librarian. W. G. Miser, C. C. O'Harra, and Rev. Fr. J. N. Fitzgerald all delivered commemorative speeches, followed by a performance by the city's high school orchestra.

By 1921, the library had accumulated 4,120 books. It was further expanded on both wings in 1938 as part of a Works Progress Administration project. By 1966, the total counted volumes was in excess of 66,000, with over 253,000 loans that year alone. However, Rapid City was outgrowing the old one-story building and the city began considering replacing it with a larger, newer one. In 1971, the new Rapid City Public Library was built and the Rapid City Carnegie Library closed down. It briefly hosted the city's police department while their new headquarters were being built but was disused again by 1981.

== Architecture ==
The Rapid City Carnegie Library is similar in style to others built in medium-sized cities. It is a one-story structure with a raised basement, exposing the lower-level windows. It has a rectangular footprint and is constructed out of yellow limestone. Its central entrance is sheltered by a portico topped by a pediment, with five total window bays on either side. It has a flat roof bordered by an entablature that runs along three of the building's four sides. The 1938 WPA expansion is identical in style to the original 1915 building, although the added wings are slightly recessed.
