= Keystone School (Keystone, South Dakota) =

- U.S. National Register of Historic Places
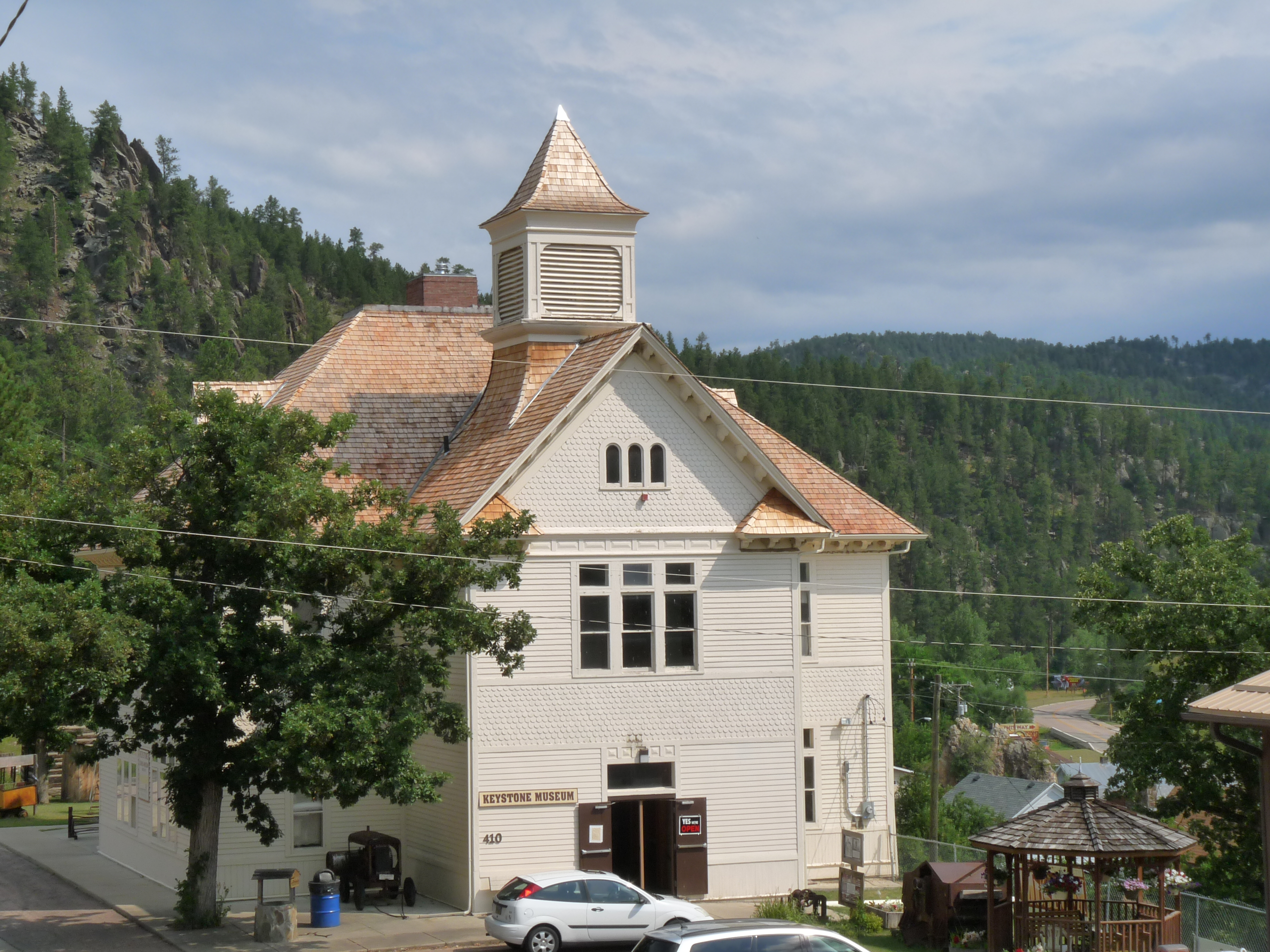

- Location within South Dakota Location within the United States
- Location: 3rd St., Keystone, South Dakota
- Coordinates: 43°53′43″N 103°25′11″W
- Area: 1 acre (0.40 ha)
- Built: 1897-1900
- Built by: Shomaker, Eli
- NRHP reference No.: 81000577
- Added to NRHP: February 22, 1981

The Keystone School, on 3rd St. in Keystone, South Dakota, was listed on the National Register of Historic Places in 1981.

It is a large rural school built 1897-1900 by Eli Shomaker, with roof of wood shingles.

In 2018, it has been the Keystone Historical Museum for a number of years.
