= Gramberg Ranch =

Historic ranch in South Dakota, US

- U.S. National Register of Historic Places
- U.S. Historic district
- Location within South Dakota
- Location: 14895 Lower Spring Rd., about 7 miles (11 km) northeast of Hermosa, South Dakota
- Coordinates: 43°54′30″N 103°05′02″W
- Area: 160 acres (0.65 km^{2})
- Built: 1885, 1936
- Built by: Gramberg, William
- Architectural style: Folk German
- NRHP reference No.: 99001584
- Added to NRHP: December 17, 1999

The Gramberg Ranch, in Pennington County, South Dakota near Hermosa, was listed on the National Register of Historic Places in 1999. The listing included eight contributing buildings, six contributing structures, and four contributing sites.

The main house is a two-story, square plan, hipped roof structure started in 1885; it was further developed in years up to 1936. It is a common bond brick building on a brick foundation.

Other buildings and structures include:

- privy
- chicken house
- granary (c.1894)
- schoolhouse, moved onto the property in 1940s to serve as a bunkhouse
- blacksmith shop
- milking barn
- hog house
- barn
- shed
- livestock shed
- kiln site
- frame house site, of house which served from c. 1888 until 1936
- four wells

The general ranch landscape is also considered a resource in the listing.
