= Cassidy House (Rapid City, South Dakota) =

Historic home in Rapid City, South Dakota, US

- U.S. National Register of Historic Places
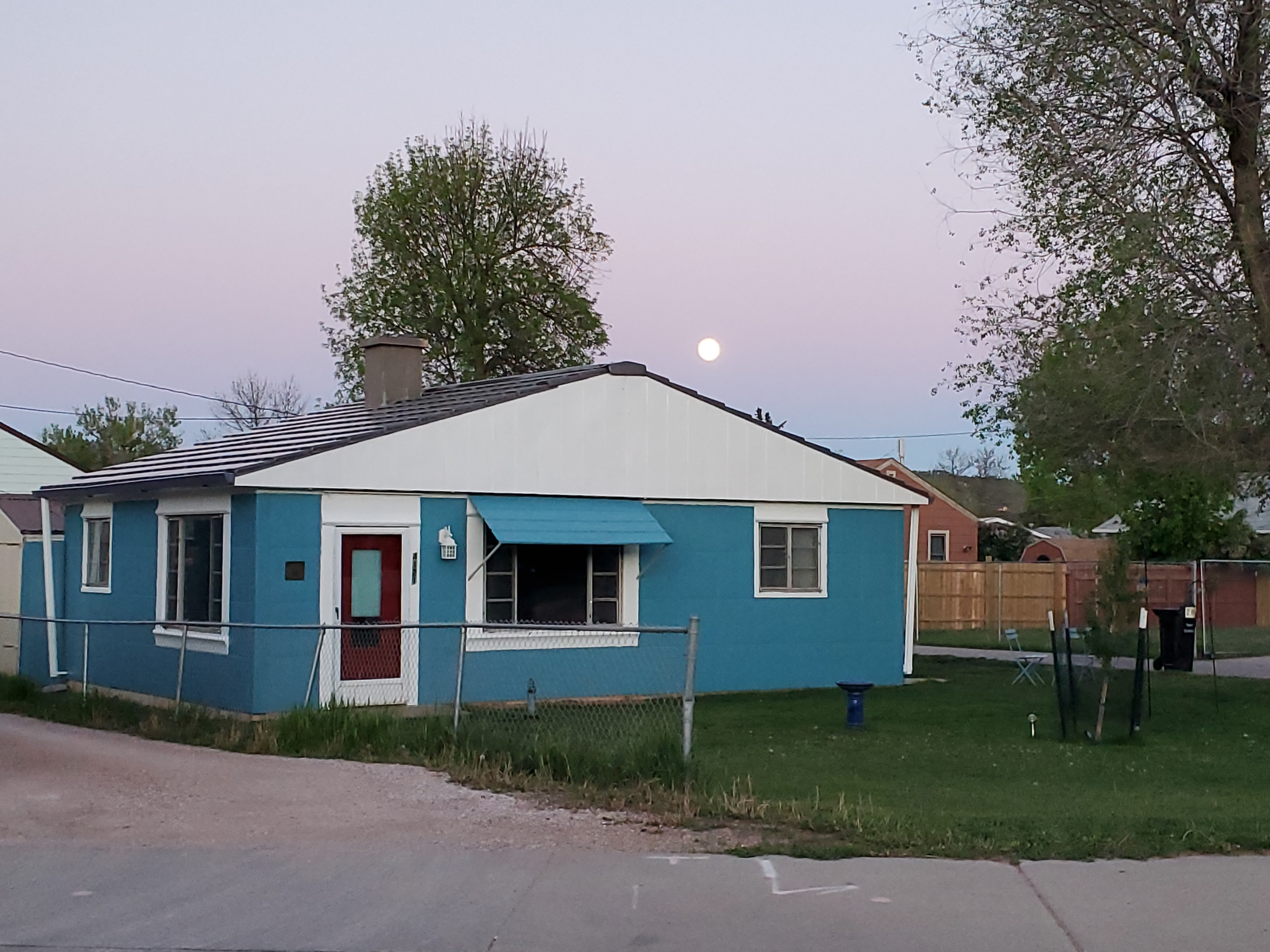
- Cassidy House - Lustron Newport 1950

- Location within South Dakota Location within the United States
- Location: 4121 Canyon Lake Rd., Rapid City, South Dakota
- Coordinates: 44°03′53″N 103°17′16″W
- Area: less than one acre
- MPS: Lustron Houses in South Dakota MPS
- NRHP reference No.: 98001407
- Added to NRHP: December 2, 1998

The Cassidy House is located at 4121 Canyon Lake Drive in Rapid City, South Dakota, and is on the National Register of Historic Places. This unique home is a Lustron house. From 1947 to 1950, Lustron manufactured enameled steel homes. Lustron was founded by Carl Strandlund, who was a Swedish-born American inventor and entrepreneur. All the parts for the homes were manufactured in a factory in Ohio, then they were shipped to the site where they could be quickly assembled.

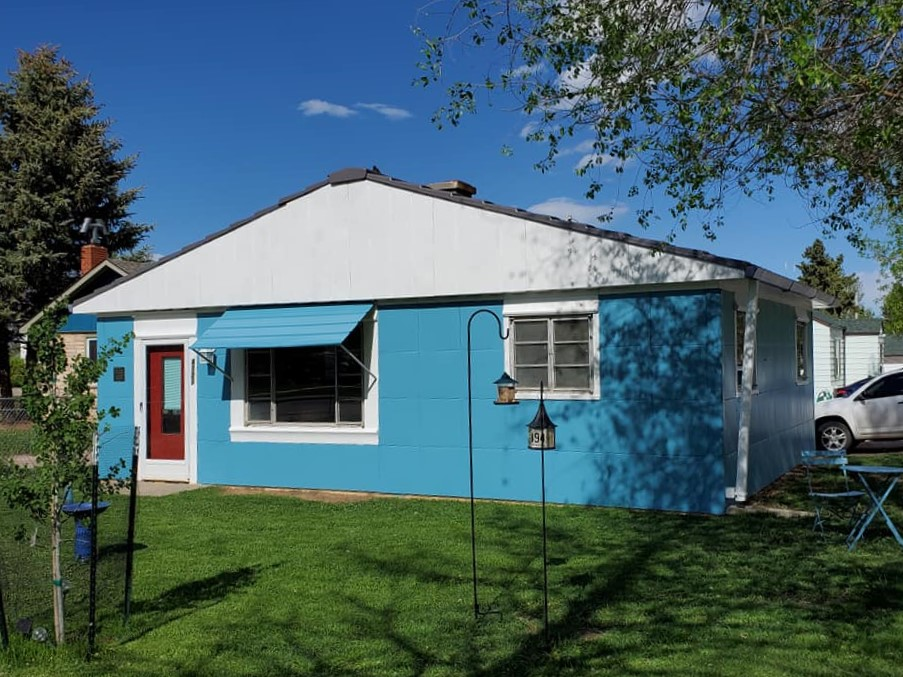
Cassidy House at 4121 Canyon Lake Drive, Rapid City, South Dakota, US. Front and right side of the property.

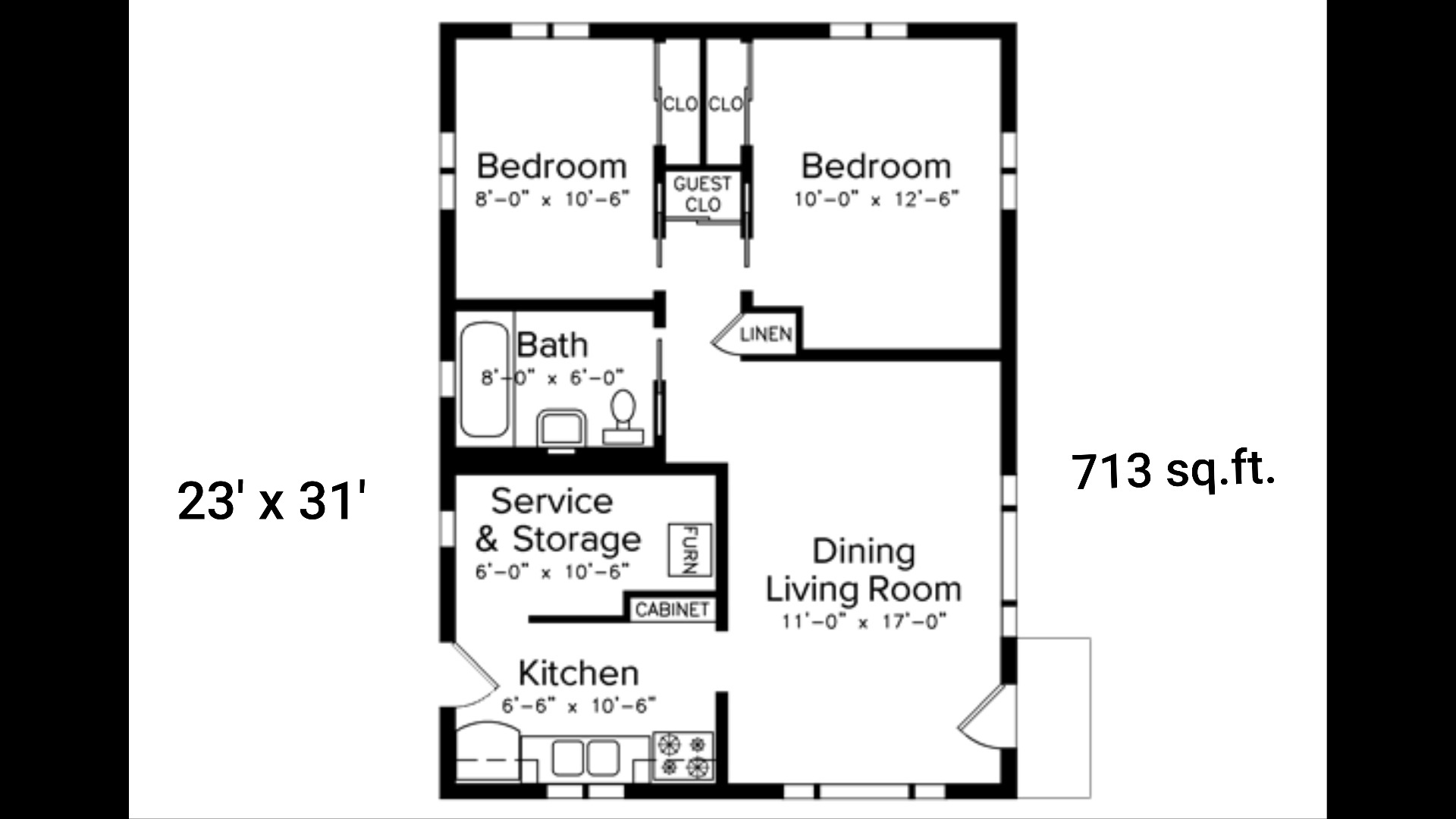
The layout of the Lustron Newport Model 023

The Cassidy House is one of only 24 Lustron Newport homes ever manufactured by the Lustron Corporation. The Newport was a two bedroom, one bath home. The total square footage of the home is 713 square feet. Unlike the earlier Westchester models, the Newport had gas forced air heating. The Newport was also known as model 023. It is significantly less common than the Lustron Westchester model. The original color of the Cassidy House was surf blue. The Cassidy House was repainted in 2021 to closely match the original color.

The Cassidy House was placed on the National Register in 1998 due to its significance of post-World War II housing and manufacturing innovations. It is the only existing Lustron Newport model in the state of South Dakota.

The Cassidy House was assembled on site in Rapid City in March 1950. A permit for construction was issued on February 28, 1950. The permit allowed one month for completion of construction.

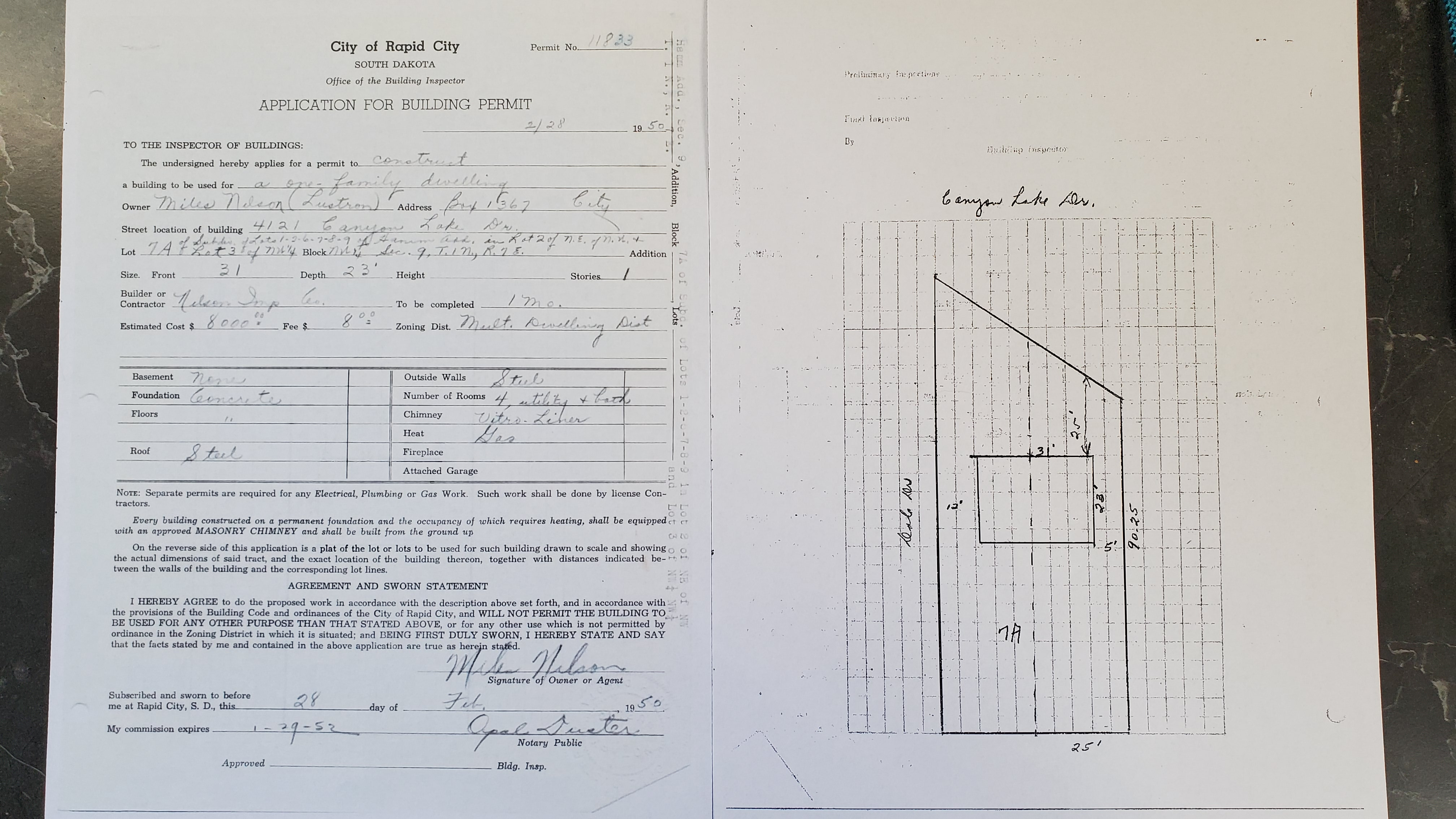
4121 Canyon Lake Drive, Rapid City, SD 57702 - Cassidy House - Lustron Newport building permit 1950

This particular home maintains the unique steel panel exterior, original steel shingled roof, steel gutters, and original aluminum windows.
