= List of dams and reservoirs in South Dakota =

Following is a list of dams and reservoirs in South Dakota.

All major dams are linked below. The National Inventory of Dams defines any "major dam" as being 50 feet (15 m) tall with a storage capacity of at least 5,000 acre-feet (6,200,000 m^{3}), or of any height with a storage capacity of 25,000 acre-feet (31,000,000 m^{3}).

== Dams and reservoirs in South Dakota ==
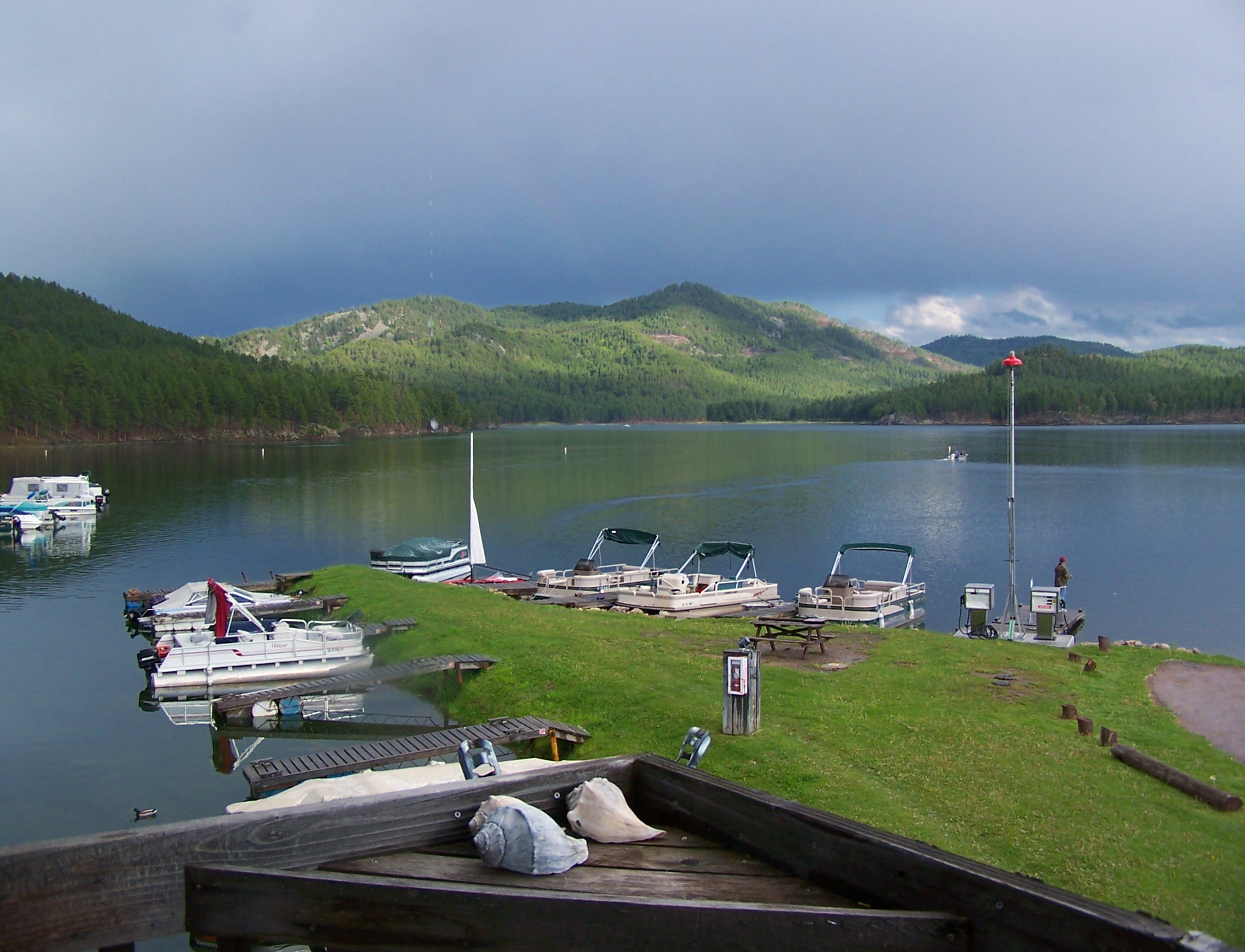
Marina at Sheridan Lake

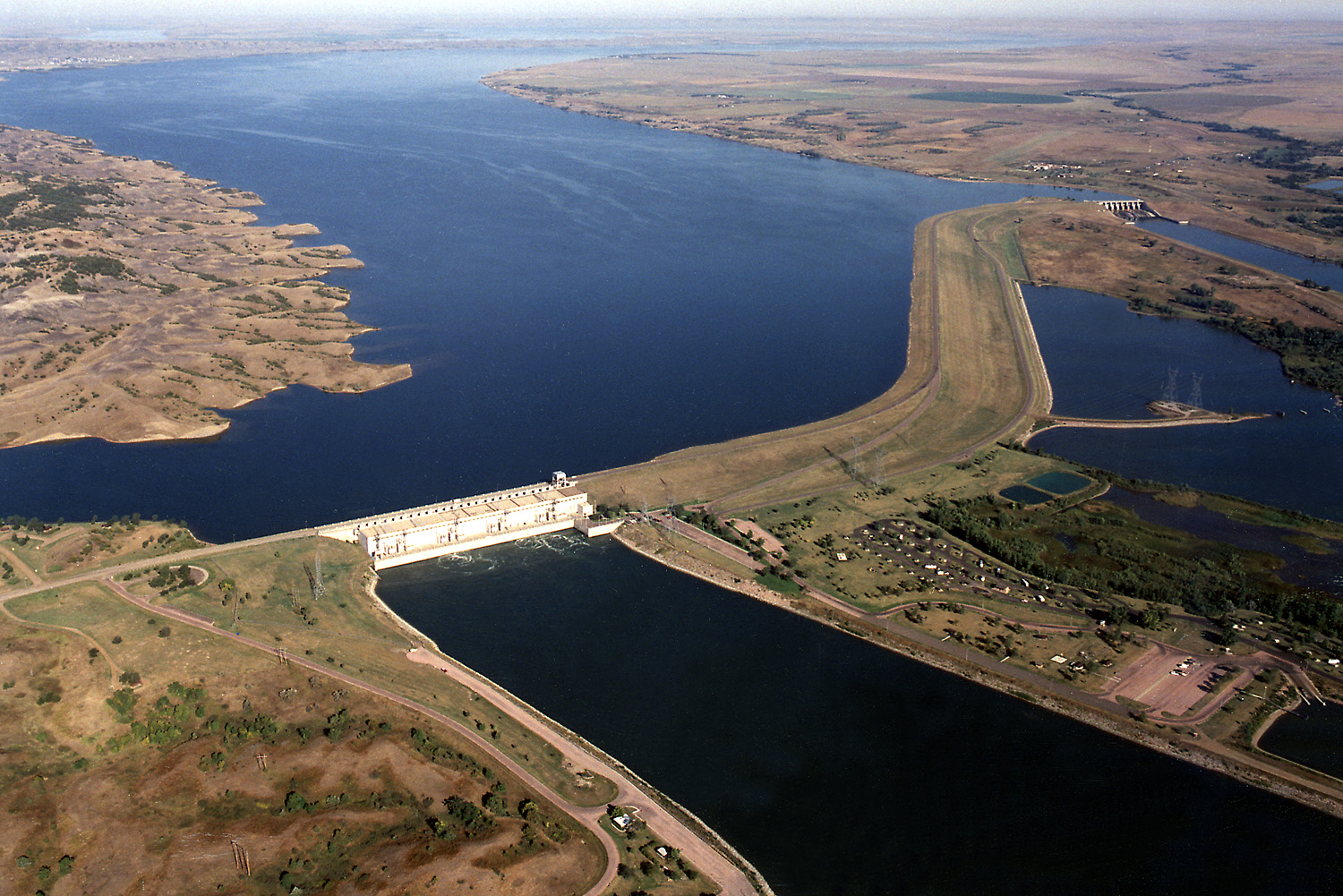
Big Bend Dam and Lake Sharpe

This list is incomplete. You can help Wikipedia by expanding it.

- Angostura Dam, Angostura Reservoir, United States Bureau of Reclamation
- Belle Fourche Dam, Belle Fourche Reservoir, USBR
- Big Bend Dam, Lake Sharpe, United States Army Corps of Engineers
- Big Stone Lake Dam, Big Stone Lake, State of Minnesota (on the South Dakota - Minnesota border)
- Cold Brook Dam, Cold Brook Lake, USACE
- Cottonwood Springs Dam, Cottonwood Springs Lake, USACE
- Deerfield Dam, Deerfield Reservoir, USBR
- Fort Randall Dam, Lake Francis Case, USACE
- Gavins Point Dam, Lewis and Clark Lake, USACE (on the South Dakota - Nebraska border)
- Oahe Dam, Lake Oahe, USACE (extends into North Dakota)
- Oglala Dam, Oglala Lake, Oglala Sioux Tribe
- Pactola Dam, Pactola Lake, USBR
- Shadehill Dam, Shadehill Reservoir, USBR
- Slater Dam, (east of CR 17, Pennington County)
- Squaw Humper Dam
- Sheridan Dam, Sheridan Lake, United States Forest Service
- Reservation Dam and White Rock Dam, Lake Traverse, USACE

== See also ==
- List of lakes in South Dakota
