= Pactola Dam =

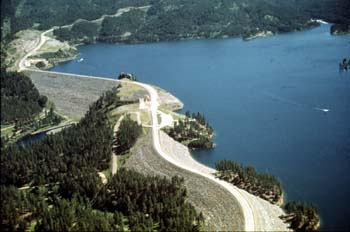

- Location within South Dakota
- Country: United States
- Location: Pennington County, South Dakota
- Coordinates: 44°04′16″N 103°29′10″W
- Opening date: 1956

Dam and spillways
- Type of dam: Earthfill
- Impounds: Rapid Creek
- Height (foundation): 245 ft (75 m)
- Length: 2,236 ft (682 m)

Reservoir
- Creates: Pactola Lake
- Total capacity: 99,029 acre⋅ft (122,150,000 m^{3})
- Surface area: 1,232 acres (499 ha)
- Normal elevation: 4,580 ft (1,400 m)

Pactola Dam is an embankment dam on Rapid Creek in Pennington County, South Dakota, about 10 miles (16 km) west of Rapid City. The dam was completed in 1956 by the U.S. Bureau of Reclamation to provide flood control, water supply and recreation. Along with the nearby Deerfield Dam, it is part of the Rapid Valley Unit of the Pick-Sloan Missouri Basin Program. U.S. Route 385 runs along the crest of the dam. The dam forms Pactola Lake, which at over 1,200 acres (490 ha) is the largest and deepest body of water in the Black Hills.

== History ==
The dam is named for the town of Pactola which today is flooded under the reservoir. The town's name originated from the Pactolus river in ancient Lydia (modern day Turkey), which was known for the gold found in its bed. The name was given to the valley by miners after the Black Hills Gold Rush of 1874–1877. The gold rush directly led to the Great Sioux War of 1876 (Black Hills War), in which the US Army drove the Lakota Sioux and Cheyenne people from their traditional lands in the Black Hills. Pactola was eventually left behind by the miners in search of richer gold deposits, but a few residents stayed in the town until the 1950s, when the Bureau of Reclamation began to purchase and clear property in preparation for building a dam and reservoir.

The Pactola Dam was built as part of the Rapid Valley Unit, in turn a part of the Pick-Sloan Missouri Basin Program. The purpose of the project was to provide water for irrigation and domestic consumption in the fast growing town of Rapid City where the existing water supply, mainly from wells, was being exhausted by heavy use. The Bureau of Reclamation conducted its first studies for a dam on Rapid Creek in 1937, and determined the final site on November 14, 1939. However, there was a controversy over whether the Pactola or Deerfield Dam should be built first, and due to this delay, most of the initial Congressional funds for the Rapid Valley Unit were moved to an irrigation project in Wyoming instead. The Bureau of Reclamation eventually decided to build Deerfield first, completing it in 1948.

The Pactola Dam was authorized under the Flood Control Act of 1944 but construction was put on hold in part due to World War II. In 1948 the Rapid Valley Water Conservancy District petitioned the Bureau of Reclamation to build Pactola, as Deerfield alone was unable to provide enough water for the area's needs. In 1949 Rapid City also requested a right to water stored in a future Pactola Reservoir, some of which would be used at Ellsworth Air Force Base. Construction of Pactola Dam began on November 25, 1952. As many as 200 people worked on at the dam site at any one time; no deaths occurred during the four years of construction but there were numerous injuries due to the hazardous terrain. All the buildings in Pactola were moved or demolished by the Bureau of Reclamation before the reservoir was allowed to fill. The dam was completed on August 15, 1956, and the first water delivery from Pactola Reservoir was on May 1, 1958.

During the Black Hills Flood of 1972, Pactola Dam stored most of the floodwater coming down from upstream, but the heaviest rains occurred in the part of the Rapid Creek watershed below the dam, resulting in catastrophic flooding in Rapid City that killed 238 people. Nonetheless, in 1987 the dam was raised 15 feet (4.6 m) and the spillway enlarged in order to provide better protection against future floods.

== Specifications ==
The Pactola Dam consists of a main earth-filled dam with two auxiliary dikes on the northern side. The main dam stands 245 feet (75 m) high as measured from the foundation and is 199.5 feet (60.8 m) above the streambed. The combined length of the dam and dikes is 2,236 feet (682 m), and contain 4,532,000 cubic yards (3,465,000 m^{3}) of material. The crest of the dam is at an elevation of 4,655 feet (1,419 m) above sea level and the spillway crest is 4,621.5 feet (1,408.6 m). The spillway is an un-gated concrete overflow structure located in between the main dam and auxiliary dikes, and has a capacity of 245,000 cubic feet per second (6,900 m^{3}/s). The dam also has outlet works that can release 1,150 cubic feet per second (33 m^{3}/s).

The 5-mile (8.0 km) long Pactola Lake has 16 miles (26 km) of shoreline and covers 1,232 acres (499 ha) at normal water levels. The reservoir has a capacity of 99,029 acre-feet (122,150,000 m^{3}), of which 54,955 acre-feet (67,786,000 m^{3}) is active or usable storage. Normal water surface elevation is 4,580 feet (1,400 m). The reservoir controls runoff from a drainage area of 319 square miles (830 km^{2}). The small town of Silver City is located at the upstream (western) end of the reservoir.

== Recreation ==
The U.S. Forest Service operates the Pactola Visitor Center, which is located at the south end of Pactola Dam. The center provides interpretive exhibits, travel information and a scenic view of the reservoir. The Pactola Pines Marina is located at Custer Gulch on the south shore of the reservoir and was opened in 2000. The privately owned marina has a capacity of 200 boats and has fishing boats, canoes and paddleboards for rent.

The reservoir is known for its large lake trout. Brown trout are found in Rapid Creek both upstream and downstream of the dam; the creek directly below the dam has been described as an "exceptional" fly fishing location.

== Climate ==
Climate data for Pactola Dam, South Dakota, 1991–2020 normals, 1955-2020 extremes: 4720ft (1439m)
Month	Jan	Feb	Mar	Apr	May	Jun	Jul	Aug	Sep	Oct	Nov	Dec	Year
Record high °F (°C)	69 (21)	70 (21)	78 (26)	85 (29)	93 (34)	99 (37)	101 (38)	98 (37)	98 (37)	86 (30)	75 (24)	70 (21)	101 (38)
Mean maximum °F (°C)	57.7 (14.3)	58.4 (14.7)	66.1 (18.9)	73.7 (23.2)	81.6 (27.6)	88.6 (31.4)	92.1 (33.4)	91.1 (32.8)	87.9 (31.1)	78.6 (25.9)	65.8 (18.8)	57.6 (14.2)	93.9 (34.4)
Mean daily maximum °F (°C)	35.8 (2.1)	36.2 (2.3)	43.8 (6.6)	50.5 (10.3)	59.9 (15.5)	70.7 (21.5)	78.5 (25.8)	77.9 (25.5)	69.3 (20.7)	55.4 (13.0)	44.6 (7.0)	36.6 (2.6)	54.9 (12.7)
Daily mean °F (°C)	23.6 (−4.7)	23.7 (−4.6)	31.3 (−0.4)	38.3 (3.5)	48.1 (8.9)	57.9 (14.4)	64.8 (18.2)	63.3 (17.4)	54.4 (12.4)	42.4 (5.8)	32.5 (0.3)	24.7 (−4.1)	42.1 (5.6)
Mean daily minimum °F (°C)	11.4 (−11.4)	11.2 (−11.6)	18.8 (−7.3)	26.1 (−3.3)	36.3 (2.4)	45.1 (7.3)	51.0 (10.6)	48.7 (9.3)	39.6 (4.2)	29.4 (−1.4)	20.3 (−6.5)	12.8 (−10.7)	29.2 (−1.5)
Mean minimum °F (°C)	−12.1 (−24.5)	−12.0 (−24.4)	−2.6 (−19.2)	10.0 (−12.2)	22.1 (−5.5)	33.0 (0.6)	39.9 (4.4)	38.1 (3.4)	26.4 (−3.1)	12.1 (−11.1)	0.6 (−17.4)	−8.7 (−22.6)	−19.8 (−28.8)
Record low °F (°C)	−34 (−37)	−34 (−37)	−24 (−31)	−8 (−22)	13 (−11)	24 (−4)	29 (−2)	27 (−3)	15 (−9)	−8 (−22)	−21 (−29)	−35 (−37)	−35 (−37)
Average precipitation inches (mm)	0.33 (8.4)	0.56 (14)	1.05 (27)	2.32 (59)	4.26 (108)	3.53 (90)	3.07 (78)	2.38 (60)	1.59 (40)	1.55 (39)	0.53 (13)	0.36 (9.1)	21.53 (545.5)
Average snowfall inches (cm)	5.70 (14.5)	8.20 (20.8)	10.50 (26.7)	12.80 (32.5)	4.50 (11.4)	0.20 (0.51)	0.00 (0.00)	0.00 (0.00)	0.80 (2.0)	6.30 (16.0)	6.50 (16.5)	5.40 (13.7)	60.9 (154.61)
Source 1: NOAA
Source 2: XMACIS (records & monthly max/mins)

== See also ==
- List of dams and reservoirs in South Dakota
- List of dams in the Missouri River watershed
