= Angostura, South Dakota =

- Census-designated place
- Location within South Dakota Location within the United States
- Coordinates: 43°18′45″N 103°22′48″W
- Country: United States
- State: South Dakota
- County: Fall River

Area
  - Total: 12.61 sq mi (32.65 km^{2})
  - Land: 12.59 sq mi (32.60 km^{2})
  - Water: 0.019 sq mi (0.05 km^{2})
- Elevation: 3,301 ft (1,006 m)

Population (2020)
  - Total: 159
  - Density: 12.6/sq mi (4.88/km^{2})
- Time zone: UTC-7 (Mountain (MST))
  - Summer (DST): UTC-6 (MDT)
- ZIP Code: 57747 (Hot Springs)
- Area code: 605
- FIPS code: 46-01560
- GNIS feature ID: 2807102

Angostura is an unincorporated area and census-designated place (CDP) in Fall River County, South Dakota, United States. The population was 159 at the 2020 census.

It is northeast of the center of the county, between U.S. Routes 18/385 to the northeast and Angostura Reservoir to the southwest. Residential development is primarily in the Angostura Heights area in the southern part of the CDP. The shoreline area next to the reservoir is part of the state-managed Angostura Recreation Area.

The community is 11 miles (18 km) southeast of Hot Springs and 13 miles (21 km) northwest of Oelrichs.

== Demographics ==
Historical population
Census	Pop.	Note	%±
2020	159		—
U.S. Decennial Census

== Education ==
The school district is Hot Springs School District 23-2.
