= Oglala (disambiguation) =

Oglala are one of the seven subtribes of the Lakota people who, along with the Dakota, make up the Očhéthi Šakówiŋ (Seven Council Fires).

Oglala may also refer to:

- Oglala, South Dakota, a town
- Oglala Dam, South Dakota
- Oglala National Grassland, Nebraska
- Ogallala Aquifer, an aquifer or concentration of groundwater in the U.S. Midwest
- USS Oglala (CM-4), a U.S. Navy minelayer sunk in the attack on Pearl Harbor
- Oglala (crater), Mars

== See also ==
- Incident at Oglala, a documentary film about a shooting incident
- Oglala Lakota College, Pine Ridge Indian Reservation, South Dakota
- Oglala Lakota County, South Dakota
