= Rapid City, Black Hills and Western Railroad =

Overview
- Headquarters: Rapid City, South Dakota
- Locale: South Dakota
- Dates of operation: 1893–1947

Technical
- Track gauge: 4 ft 8 1/2 in (1,435 mm) standard gauge
- Length: 36.043 miles (58.006 kilometres)

The Rapid City, Black Hills and Western Railroad, also known simply as the Black Hills and Western Railroad and commonly referred to as the Rapid Canyon Line or the Crouch Line, is a defunct standard gauge freight railroad line that operated in the Black Hills in the U.S. state of South Dakota. The railroad became known throughout the area for its crookedness and later became a tourist attraction. It ran from Rapid City to Mystic for a distance of 36.043 miles. The railroad ceased operations in 1947.

== Naming ==
Though the official name is the Rapid City, Black Hills and Western Railroad, many sources refer to it as simply the Black Hills and Western Railroad. It is also called the Crouch Line, in honor of its founder, C.D. Crouch. Through the years, the line's name varied as it switched owners. These names were as follows: Dakota & Wyoming Railroad; Missouri River & North Western Railroad; Dakota, Western & Missouri River Railroad; Dakota, Wyoming and Western Railroad; Dakota Pacific Railroad; Dakota, Wyoming & Missouri River Railroad; Black Hills & Missouri River Railroad; and Black Hills & Wyoming Railroad.

== History ==
The Crouch Line was one of many railroads in the Black Hills that experienced the area's boom and bust. Most of these early railroads were short-lived, and the main reason for the failures was flash flooding. The Crouch Line entered the planning stages in the early 1890s, with the purpose of connecting Rapid City to the central Black Hills. The initial line from Rapid City to Dark Canyon was completed in 1893. In 1896, C.D. Crouch raised money to extend the line to Mystic. Crouch also hoped to later extend the line into Wyoming and to the Missouri River. Construction on the line from Dark Canyon to Mystic began in 1901 and was completed in 1906, and a celebration was held on May 27, 1906. In June 1907, a flood wiped out a small portion of the line, but by late 1907, the railroad had been repaired.

During the night of November 15, 1907, a bridge in a narrow gorge located north of Silver City caught fire as a train approached. Engineer Almore Harper could not stop the train; it is speculated that he jumped before the wreck. The fireman was killed, but both Harper and the conductor survived. A few of the rear cars stayed on the track, while the rest of the train fell into the creek 26 feet (7.9 m) below. The train had been hauling coal from Sheridan, Wyoming to Rapid City, and 3 cars of coal ignited shortly after the wreck.

The railroad received a widespread reputation for its crookedness; it was once called the "crookedest line in the world", and some accounts claimed that there were bends in the line that allowed the engineer and brakeman in the caboose to shake hands. Some rails were specially manufactured to be bent before they were placed, in order to fit the bends. 105 bridges were built over Rapid Creek in only 26 miles.

In February 1908 Crouch Line employees in Rapid City, S.D. reported that a boxcar loaded with building materials on the Milwaukee railroad became uncoupled and rolled away from the station. This unplanned departure began just northeast of the Crouch Line depot. The runaway boxcar was not stopped until it reached Creston, S.D., by the action of telegraph operator H. C. Troth who blocked the track with wood.

From 1910 to 1913, the line flourished, hauling Wyoming coal. On June 30, 1917, the railroad had 3 steam locomotives, 3 passenger cars, 7 pieces of work equipment, and 8 freight cars. There were about 32.4 miles of track on the main line and another 4.7 miles of sidings and yard tracks. No property had been constructed by the line.

By 1920, the railroad was having significant financial difficulties, but local businessman and politician James Halley II helped the railroad continue operations. By 1940, it had evolved solely into a tourist attraction, offering ride tours for as much as $2.70 per person. The Crouch Line was the longest-lasting of its kind in the Black Hills, operating until 1946. Most of the railroad has been taken up or destroyed, especially after the 1972 Black Hills flood. The portion of the route that ran from Pactola to Mystic has been converted into a hiking trail, which starts at Silver City.

A collection of 12 photographs taken by rail photographer Otto Perry (1894-1970) of Crouch Line rail equipment used from 1933-1947 is held in the Denver, CO public library's Special Collections.

In summer 2013, the Crouch Line was featured in an exhibit in the Adelstein Gallery in The Journey Museum in Rapid City.

== Route ==
The railroad started on the west side of Rapid City, South Dakota. It continued along the north shore of Canyon Lake and ran up Rapid Canyon through Johnson Siding, Hisega, Big Bend, and Canyon City. From there, it ran to Pactola (which is now submerged under Pactola Lake) and on to Silver City, and followed Rapid Creek to its final stop at Mystic. There, it connected to the Chicago, Burlington and Quincy Railroad, which ran north towards Deadwood, Lead, and Spearfish Canyon and south towards Hill City; the Chicago & Northwestern Railway; and the Chicago, Milwaukee & St. Paul Railroad.

The present-day South Dakota Highway 44 closely follows the old path of the Crouch Line. US 385 crosses over the old path at Pactola Lake.

== See also ==
- Black Hills Central Railroad
- List of defunct railroads of North America
