= Rimrock Area, South Dakota =

Coordinates: 44°05′05″N 103°26′17″W

The Rimrock Area is a suburban area of Rapid City, South Dakota, located along South Dakota Highway 44 and Rapid Creek in the eastern Black Hills, between Rapid City and US-385. The area consists of a series of rural residential areas, subdivisions of various sizes, and old towns, including:

- Dark Canyon, South Dakota
- Big Bend, South Dakota
- Hisega, South Dakota (sometimes divided into Upper and Lower Hisega)
- Johnson Siding, South Dakota
- Placerville, South Dakota

The area has been a suburb of Rapid City since the construction of the Black Hills and Western Railroad in the late 19th century, built along Rapid Creek between Rapid City and Mystic, South Dakota to connect to the Black Hills Highline. Today, an estimated 15,000 people live year-round in the area, most of whom work in Rapid City.

The area includes a number of minor tourist attractions, including Black Hills Caverns (formerly Wildcat Cave), the now defunct Crystal Cave (formerly Nameless Cave), Thunderhead Falls, and Rapid Creek itself, with a cold-water trout fish hatchery. Placerville is now a church-affiliated camp; other resort/tourist camps and bed-and-breakfast places are scattered through the area.

Many homes in Dark Canyon were destroyed, and lives lost, in the 1972 Black Hills Flood, and in many places abandoned bridge abutments and other features created by the flood can still be seen today. In recent years, business development has picked up in the Rimrock Area, especially in Johnson Siding, considered to be the "downtown" of the community, with a general store and service station, motel, and other businesses. The Johnson Siding Volunteer Fire Department serves the area and completed a new, larger firehouse in the recent past; the Rimrock Evangelical Free Church is a dominating presence in the narrow valley of Rapid Creek.
