= Robideau =

Robideau may refer to:

- Robert Robideau
- Roubadeau Pass
