= Silver City, South Dakota =

Silver City, South Dakota Elkhorn Prairie
- Place
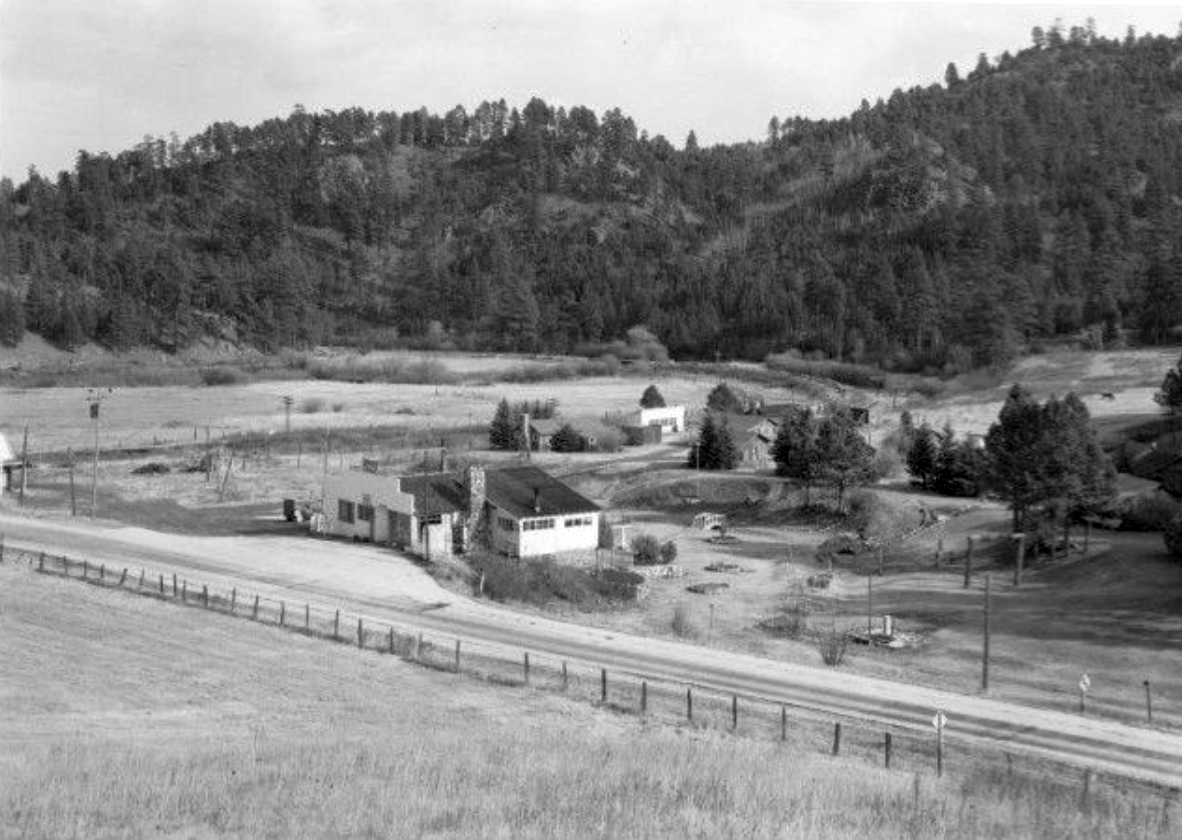
- Silver City, 1948. Photo by George A. Grant.

- Location of Silver City in South Dakota.
- Coordinates: 44°05′03″N 103°33′49″W
- Country: United States
- State: South Dakota
- County: Pennington
- Elevation: 4,630 ft (1,410 m)
- Time zone: UTC-7 (MST)
  - Summer (DST): UTC-6 (MDT)
- Area code: 605
- GNIS feature ID: 5769045

Silver City is an unincorporated community in Pennington County, South Dakota, United States, outside Rapid City. It lies at the head of Pactola Lake on Rapid Creek, and is about 5 miles west of U.S. Route 385 via a paved county road. It is not tracked by the U.S. Census Bureau.

== History ==
The area was first referenced by General George A. Custer who entered the Hills in 1874 and referred to the area as Elkhorn Prairie. The first settlement at Silver City was made in 1876. Silver City was a mining town for many years. It was located on the Black Hills and Western Railroad until its abandonment a few years before the construction of Pactola Dam.

Today, the town is a resort area with a campground and cabins for rental. There is also a church. Additional USFS campgrounds are located nearby, and there is a walk-in trout fishing area along Rapid Creek to the west of the town. Silver City has a volunteer fire department, and a small community center in the old schoolhouse, but is now part of the Hill City School District. The community of about 80 homes is becoming a bedroom community for Rapid City. The town is also the start of a Volksmarch that goes around Pactola Lake.
