= Angostura Recreation Area =

State recreation area in South Dakota, United States

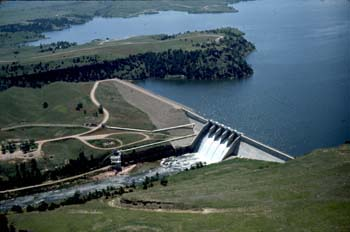
- Angostura Dam and Reservoir

- Location within South Dakota
- Interactive map of Angostura Recreation Area
- Location: Fall River County, South Dakota, United States
- Coordinates: 43°20′45″N 103°25′19″W
- Area: 1,125 acres (455 ha)
- Elevation: 3,264 ft (995 m)
- Established: 1954
- Administrator: South Dakota Department of Game, Fish and Parks
- Website: Official website

Angostura Recreation Area is a state recreation area in South Dakota on the eastern side of Angostura Reservoir in Fall River County. It was established in 1954, five years after the Angostura Dam created the reservoir. It is located approximately 10 miles south of Hot Springs.

The recreation area is administered by the South Dakota Department of Game, Fish, and Parks. It covers 1,125 acres and offers paved bike trails, campgrounds, beaches, and other activities. It provides reservoir access for boating, fishing and other water activities.

== See also ==
- List of South Dakota state parks
