= Angostura Dam (U.S.) =

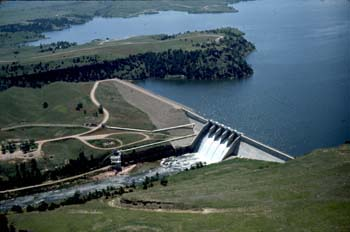
- Angostura Dam with spillways open

- Location within South Dakota
- Country: United States
- Location: Fall River County, South Dakota
- Coordinates: 43°20′34″N 103°26′11″W
- Purpose: Irrigation
- Status: Operational
- Construction began: 1946
- Opening date: 1949; 77 years ago
- Owner: U.S. Bureau of Reclamation

Dam and spillways
- Type of dam: Embankment, earth-fill
- Impounds: Cheyenne River
- Height: 193 feet (59 m)
- Length: 2,030 feet (620 m)
- Elevation at crest: 3,199 feet (975 m)
- Dam volume: 850,000 cubic yards (650,000 m^{3})

Reservoir
- Creates: Angostura Reservoir
- Total capacity: 195,121-acre-foot (0.240678 km^{3})

Angostura Dam is an embankment dam across the Cheyenne River in Fall River County in southwestern South Dakota in the United States, about 75 miles (121 km) south of Rapid City. The dam consists of an earth-fill embankment with a concrete spillway section, 193 feet (59 m) high and 2,030 feet (620 m) long; it withholds the 195,121-acre-foot (0.240678 km^{3}) Angostura Reservoir. The dam was conceived as early as 1913, but it was not until the 1930s when a regional drought caused crop failures that the project received widespread support from farmers. Built from 1946 to 1949, the dam is part of the Angostura Division of the Pick-Sloan Missouri Basin Program, and is operated by the U.S. Bureau of Reclamation.

The dam's primary purpose is to store water for the irrigation of 12,218 acres (4,944 ha) of project lands. The service area lies along 24 miles (39 km) of the Cheyenne River below the dam, and is supplied by the Angostura Canal, which has a diversion capacity of 290 cubic feet per second (8.2 m^{3}/s). The dam and reservoir regulate runoff from an area of 9,034 square miles (23,400 km^{2}). The reservoir has a conservation storage capacity of 138,761 acre-feet (0.171159 km^{3}), with an extra 56,740 acre-feet (0.06999 km^{3}) of surcharge, flood-control storage. Flood water releases are controlled by a spillway with five radial gates, which can pass up to 247,000 cu ft/s (7,000 m^{3}/s).

Angostura Reservoir is one of the only large lakes in western South Dakota. With 36 miles (58 km) of shoreline and 4,706 acres (1,904 ha) of water, the reservoir is stocked with several species of fish, including walleye, smallmouth bass and crappie.

The Angostura Recreation Area operated by the South Dakota Department of Game, Fish, and Parks surrounds the lake.

== See also ==
- Pick-Sloan Plan
- U.S. Bureau of Reclamation
