= Johnson Siding, South Dakota =

Johnson Siding, South Dakota Onhson Siding
- Human settlement
- Location of Johnson Siding in South Dakota.
- Coordinates: 44°05′04″N 103°26′17″W
- Country: United States
- State: South Dakota
- County: Pennington
- Elevation: 4,288 ft (1,307 m)

Population (2020)
  - Total: 614
- Time zone: UTC-7 (MST)
  - Summer (DST): UTC-6 (MDT)
- Area code: 605
- GNIS feature ID: 2628846

Johnson Siding is a census-designated place in Pennington County, South Dakota, United States. The population as of the 2020 census was 614. It is an unincorporated community, and it is located in the Rimrock Area, approximately 10 miles west of Rapid City. Johnson Siding is surrounded by the Black Hills National Forest. It is the only significant business district in the Rimrock Area, with a general store, deli, casino, tavern, the Johnson Siding Volunteer Fire Department firehouse, the Rimrock Evangelical Free Church meetinghouse, and a community center. However, most inhabitants work in Rapid City or Deadwood.

Johnson Siding is named for a siding on the old Rapid City, Black Hills and Western Railroad (the Crouch Line) which ran up Rapid Creek between Rapid City and the Black Hills Highline at Mystic, which was originally constructed to serve the Johnson Sawmill, located a short distance upstream from the existing town.

Johnson Siding is located on South Dakota Highway 44 at the intersection of Norris Peak Road, a paved county road, which connects the Rapid Creek valley with the Box Elder Creek valley, and Nemo Road to the north.

Johnson Siding was the site of the political convention which first organized the South Dakota Libertarian Party in 1992, at which Costas "Gus" Hercules was nominated to the U.S. Senate. Johnson's Mill was also the head of the Hisega Flume, a wooden waterway constructed high on the south cliffs of the Rapid Creek canyon to supply a small hydroelectric plant at Big Bend near present-day Thunderhead Falls in the early 1900s, one of several National Engineering Landmarks in the Black Hills. This small Dakota Power plant delivered electricity to Rapid City until the community's needs out-grew the plant's capacity. It was shut down in the late 1930s. Dakota Power became a part of Black Hills Power and Light, eventually becoming Black Hills Corporation. A few remnants of the flume are still visible high on the south side of the canyon at the big curve of SD Highway 44 before one gets to Johnson Siding.

== Climate ==
Johnson Siding has a dry-winter humid continental climate (Köppen Dwb).

Climate data for Johnson Siding, South Dakota, 1991–2020 normals: 4184ft (1275m)
Month	Jan	Feb	Mar	Apr	May	Jun	Jul	Aug	Sep	Oct	Nov	Dec	Year
Record high °F (°C)	70 (21)	71 (22)	78 (26)	82 (28)	92 (33)	101 (38)	106 (41)	100 (38)	96 (36)	87 (31)	78 (26)	72 (22)	106 (41)
Mean maximum °F (°C)	61.9 (16.6)	60.7 (15.9)	66.7 (19.3)	75.6 (24.2)	84.1 (28.9)	91.9 (33.3)	95.8 (35.4)	94.4 (34.7)	90.4 (32.4)	81.6 (27.6)	69.1 (20.6)	59.8 (15.4)	96.5 (35.8)
Mean daily maximum °F (°C)	39.2 (4.0)	39.3 (4.1)	47.9 (8.8)	55.4 (13.0)	64.2 (17.9)	75.0 (23.9)	82.8 (28.2)	81.4 (27.4)	73.4 (23.0)	59.1 (15.1)	47.6 (8.7)	39.5 (4.2)	58.7 (14.9)
Daily mean °F (°C)	25.7 (−3.5)	26.5 (−3.1)	34.4 (1.3)	42.1 (5.6)	51.4 (10.8)	61.1 (16.2)	68.3 (20.2)	66.6 (19.2)	58.3 (14.6)	45.4 (7.4)	34.4 (1.3)	26.6 (−3.0)	45.1 (7.3)
Mean daily minimum °F (°C)	12.2 (−11.0)	13.6 (−10.2)	20.9 (−6.2)	28.8 (−1.8)	38.5 (3.6)	47.3 (8.5)	53.8 (12.1)	51.8 (11.0)	43.3 (6.3)	31.6 (−0.2)	21.2 (−6.0)	13.6 (−10.2)	31.4 (−0.3)
Mean minimum °F (°C)	−10.5 (−23.6)	−7.6 (−22.0)	−2.2 (−19.0)	11.5 (−11.4)	24.2 (−4.3)	35.5 (1.9)	43.6 (6.4)	42.0 (5.6)	28.2 (−2.1)	15.6 (−9.1)	2.7 (−16.3)	−8.1 (−22.3)	−17.3 (−27.4)
Record low °F (°C)	−23 (−31)	−32 (−36)	−19 (−28)	−3 (−19)	17 (−8)	31 (−1)	39 (4)	35 (2)	20 (−7)	3 (−16)	−9 (−23)	−22 (−30)	−32 (−36)
Average precipitation inches (mm)	0.39 (9.9)	0.52 (13)	0.91 (23)	2.42 (61)	4.21 (107)	3.56 (90)	3.48 (88)	2.14 (54)	1.37 (35)	1.57 (40)	0.56 (14)	0.45 (11)	21.58 (545.9)
Average snowfall inches (cm)	6.2 (16)	6.8 (17)	10.0 (25)	10.6 (27)	2.3 (5.8)	0.2 (0.51)	0.0 (0.0)	0.0 (0.0)	0.9 (2.3)	4.3 (11)	5.3 (13)	6.0 (15)	52.6 (132.61)
Source 1: NOAA
Source 2: XMACIS (1995-2010 snowfall, records & monthly max/mins)

== Education ==
It is in Rapid City School District 51-4.
