= Oglala Dam =

- Location within South Dakota
- Country: United States
- Location: Pine Ridge Indian Reservation in Oglala Lakota County, South Dakota
- Coordinates: 43°10′38″N 102°44′23″W
- Purpose: Irrigation and Water Storage
- Status: Operational
- Construction began: 1938; 88 years ago
- Opening date: 1941; 85 years ago
- Owner: Oglala Lakota Sioux Tribe

Dam and spillways
- Type of dam: Embankment, earth-fill
- Impounds: White Clay Creek
- Height: 80 ft (24 m)
- Length: 2,600 ft (790 m)

Reservoir
- Creates: Oglala Lake
- Total capacity: 18,300-acre-foot (0.0226 km^{3})
- Surface area: 643 acres (260 ha)
- Normal elevation: 2,992 ft (912 m)

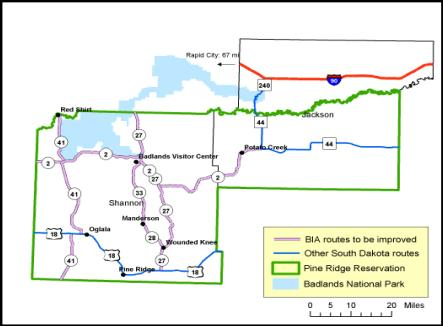
Oglala Lake and Dam (not shown) stands just south of the town of Oglala, South Dakota

Oglala Dam (National ID # SD00969) is a dam in Oglala Lakota County, South Dakota, within the Pine Ridge Indian Reservation.

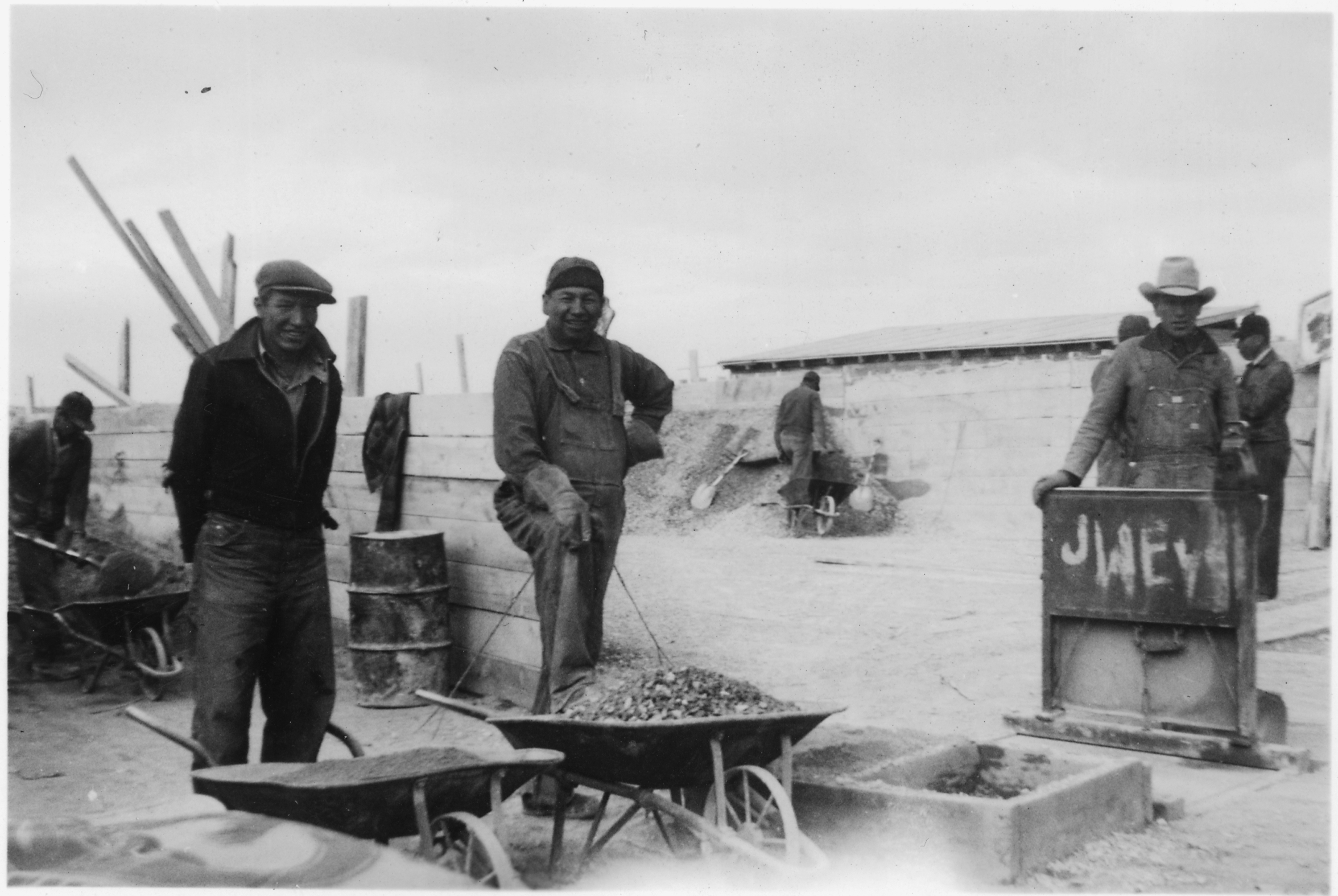
Men working on the Oglala Dam project, 1940

The earthen dam was constructed between 1938 and 1941 by the United States Bureau of Indian Affairs using labor of the Civilian Conservation Corps and the Public Works Administration. The structure has a height of 80 feet (24 m) and a length of 2,600 feet (790 m) at its crest. It impounds White Clay Creek for irrigation storage. The dam is owned and operated by the Oglala Sioux Tribe.

The reservoir it creates, Oglala Lake, has a normal water surface of 643 acres (260 ha) and has a maximum capacity of 18,300 acre-feet (22,600,000 m^{3}). As a development project, even after significant government subsidies, the dam has been "a dismal failure from the year of its construction."

The Oglala Sioux Tribe website reports 3 to 4 "seasonal openings each year." The Safety of Dams Program monitors the Dam's water levels and flows for early detection of major dam breach/breaks or severe flood emergencies."

The dam and lake are just south of Oglala, South Dakota, near U.S. Route 18.

== See also ==
- Pine Ridge Indian Reservation
- List of dams and reservoirs in South Dakota
