= Cottonwood Springs Dam =

- Location of Cottonwood Springs Dam in South Dakota.
- Country: United States
- Location: Fall River County, South Dakota, USA
- Coordinates: 43°26′17″N 103°33′57″W
- Status: Operational
- Opening date: 1969
- Owners: U.S. Army Corps of Engineers, Omaha District

Dam and spillways
- Type of dam: Embankment, earthen
- Height: 123 ft (37 m)

Reservoir
- Total capacity: 11,635 acre⋅ft (14,351,561 m^{3})
- Surface area: 36 acres (15 ha)
- Normal elevation: 3,842 ft (1,171 m)

Cottonwood Springs Dam is a dam in Fall River County, South Dakota in the southwestern part of the state, south of the Black Hills.

The earthen dam was constructed in 1969 by the U.S. Army Corps of Engineers with a height of 123 feet (37 m) and a length at its crest of 1,190 feet (360 m). It impounds Cottonwood Springs Creek for area flood control.

The reservoir it creates, Cottonwood Springs Lake, has a water surface of 36 acres (15 ha) and has a maximum capacity of 11,635 acre-feet (14,352,000 m^{3}). Recreation is year-round and includes camping, hiking, and fishing. Recreation is managed by the Corps of Engineers.

The dam and lake is approximately 6 miles (9.7 km) west of Hot Springs, South Dakota. Cold Brook Dam, another Corps of Engineers dam is located about 5 miles (8.0 km) northeast.

The dam and reservoir are located within the Cheyenne River watershed.

== See also ==
- U.S. Army Corps of Engineers
- Black Hills National Forest
- Angostura Reservoir
