= Oglala, South Dakota =

Oglala, South Dakota Oglála
- Census-designated place
- Location in Oglala Lakota County and the state of South Dakota
- Coordinates: 43°11′12″N 102°45′20″W
- Country: United States
- State: South Dakota
- County: Oglala Lakota
- Civil township: West Oglala Lakota Unorganized Territory, South Dakota

Area
  - Total: 13.36 sq mi (34.61 km^{2})
  - Land: 12.50 sq mi (32.38 km^{2})
  - Water: 0.86 sq mi (2.22 km^{2})
- Elevation: 3,035 ft (925 m)

Population (2020)
  - Total: 1,282
  - Density: 102.5/sq mi (39.59/km^{2})
- Time zone: UTC−7 (Mountain (MST))
  - Summer (DST): UTC−6 (MDT)
- ZIP code: 57764
- Area code: 605
- FIPS code: 46-46540
- GNIS feature ID: 2393169
- Website: www.lakotamall.com/oglalasiouxtribe/index.htm

Oglala (Lakota: Oglála; is a census-designated place (CDP) in the West Oglala Lakota Unorganized Territory (civil township) equivalent, Oglala Lakota County, South Dakota, United States. The population was 1,282 at the 2020 census. Its location is in the northwest of the Pine Ridge Indian Reservation.

The community takes its name from the Oglala Lakota (also called the Oglala Sioux).

== Geography ==
According to the United States Census Bureau, the CDP has a total area of 13.4 square miles (35 km^{2}), of which 12.5 square miles (32 km^{2}) is land and 0.9 square miles (2.3 km^{2}) (6.37%) is water. Oglala stands directly north of the Oglala Dam and its reservoir, Oglala Lake, completed in 1941.

== Demographics ==
Historical population
Census	Pop.	Note	%±
1990	422		—
2000	1,229		191.2%
2010	1,290		5.0%
2020	1,282		−0.6%
U.S. Decennial Census

As of the census of 2000, there were 1,229 people, 229 households, and 201 families residing in the CDP. The population density was 98.3 inhabitants per square mile (38.0/km^{2}). There were 279 housing units at an average density of 22.3 per square mile (8.6/km^{2}). The racial makeup of the CDP was 0.73% White, 98.78% Native American, 0.08% Asian, 0.08% from other races, and 0.33% from two or more races. Hispanic or Latino of any race were 0.33% of the population.

There were 229 households, out of which 53.7% had children under the age of 18 living with them, 34.1% were married couples living together, 41.5% had a female householder with no husband present, and 12.2% were non-families. 10.0% of all households were made up of individuals, and 4.4% had someone living alone who was 65 years of age or older. The average household size was 5.31 and the average family size was 5.62.

In the CDP, the population was spread out, with 47.8% under the age of 18, 10.6% from 18 to 24, 26.9% from 25 to 44, 9.9% from 45 to 64, and 4.9% who were 65 years of age or older. The median age was 19 years. For every 100 females, there were 96.6 males. For every 100 females age 18 and over, there were 92.8 males.

The median income for a household in the CDP was $17,300, and the median income for a family was $19,688. Males had a median income of $15,781 versus $20,781 for females. The per capita income for the CDP was $3,824. About 45.1% of families and 55.8% of the population were below the poverty line, including 64.1% of those under age 18 and 52.3% of those age 65 or over.

== Education ==
The only school in Oglala is Isna Wica Owayawa, also known as Loneman Day School. It is administered by the Bureau of Indian Education and serves kindergarten through eighth grade.

== See also ==
- Pine Ridge, South Dakota
- American Indian Movement
- Incident at Oglala
