= Robert Robideau =

Native American activist

- Born: Robert Eugene Robideau; November 11, 1946; Portland, Oregon, U.S
- Died: February 17, 2009 (aged 62); Barcelona, Spain
- Citizenship: American
- Occupations: Painter; activist

Robert Eugene Robideau (November 11, 1946 – February 17, 2009) was an American activist who was acquitted in the 1975 shooting deaths of two FBI agents in South Dakota.

== Early years ==
Robideau was born the second of 12 children in Portland, Oregon, on November 11, 1946, to William Robideau from the White Earth Reservation, who was of Ojibwa, Dakota, and French descent, and Yvonne Lavendure from the Turtle Mountain Indian Reservation. He attended Roosevelt High School in Portland and later graduated from Portland State University, where he earned a degree in cultural anthropology, as well as a degree in the arts from the Institute of Native American Arts in Santa Fe, New Mexico.

== American Indian Movement ==
Robideau left Portland with his cousin Leonard Peltier and other family members, heading to South Dakota to become members of the American Indian Movement (AIM) and to participate in its protests against corruption and poverty on tribal reservations. The AIM occupied the reservation town of Wounded Knee, South Dakota, in 1973, known as the Wounded Knee incident.

On June 25, 1975, two Federal Bureau of Investigation agents Jack R. Coler and Ronald A. Williams who had been investigating a case involving stolen cowboy boots followed a car onto the Pine Ridge Indian Reservation and were shot and killed by heavy rifle fire. Leonard Peltier was named by the FBI as a suspect in the case and placed on the agency's List of Ten Most Wanted Fugitives. While driving Peltier's station wagon in Kansas several months later, ammunition in the car exploded, seriously injuring Robideau and other AIM members in the car. Agent Coler's revolver was found in the car. Robideau was arrested and tried together with Darrelle Dean Butler in a Federal court in Cedar Rapids, Iowa, for the killings of the FBI agents and was acquitted. Defense attorney Lewis Gurwitz showed the jury a sacred pipe during opening arguments and stated that the pipe would be kept on the defense table during the trial as a sign that the Native American's religion forbids murder.

Royal Canadian Mounted Police arrested Peltier, and he was charged and convicted of the slayings and sentenced to two life sentences. Robideau led a committee seeking a pardon for Peltier. Robideau was included in Incident at Oglala, a 1992 documentary about the incident directed by Michael Apted and narrated by Robert Redford.

== Later life and death ==
He later became a painter who focused on Native American subjects and served as director to the former American Indian Movement Museum in Barcelona. In 2007, he toured the Canadian province of British Columbia claiming he was defending his cousin, Leonard Peltier's innocence against his murder charges and other convictions.

Robideau died at age 62 (Note: Robideau's obituary in The Seattle Times stated his age at death as 61, though a calculation based on his birth date of November 11, 1946 makes him 62 at the time of his death.) on February 17, 2009, in Barcelona, Spain. Spanish officials indicated that the cause may have been from seizures related to shrapnel that had remained in his brain after an accidental explosion. At the time of his death, he was survived by his wife Pilar, and two sons from a previous relationship(s), Bobby and Michael Robideau, who reside in South Dakota and Oregon respectively.

Shortly before his death, Robideau had planned on moving back to the United States permanently. According to his niece, Starr Robideau, Robideau's body was brought back to Portland, Oregon where his funeral was held. A service honoring him was also conducted in Edgewood, New Mexico, in March 2009.
