= Angostura Reservoir =

Artificial lake in the state of South Dakota, United States

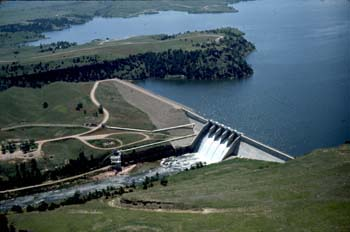
- Angostura Dam

- Location within South Dakota Location within the United States
- Location: Fall River County, South Dakota, United States. Near Hot Springs, South Dakota
- Coordinates: 43°20′36″N 103°26′16″W
- Type: artificial lake
- Primary inflows: Cheyenne River Dry Creek Horsehead Creek Tepeee Creek
- Primary outflows: Cheyenne River
- Basin countries: United States
- Surface area: 4,407 acres (17.83 km^{2})
- Max. depth: 75 ft (23 m)
- Shore length^{1}: 42 mi (68 km)
- Surface elevation: 3,127 ft (953 m)
- ^{1} Shore length is not a well-defined measure.

Angostura Reservoir is a reservoir on the Cheyenne River in Fall River County, South Dakota, United States. It was created after the construction of Angostura Dam in 1949 for irrigation by the U.S. Bureau of Reclamation. "Angostura" means "narrows" in Spanish.

The reservoir covers an area of 4,407 acres (17.83 km^{2}), has a surface elevation of 3,127 ft (953 m), and a maximum depth of 75 ft (23 m).

The Angostura Recreation Area surrounds the lake and is a popular location for boating, swimming, camping, and fishing. The lake supports populations of walleye, northern pike, smallmouth bass, and sunfish. As one of the only large bodies of water in the area, Angostura Reservoir is also an important location for migratory birds.

== See also ==
- List of lakes in South Dakota
- U.S. Bureau of Reclamation
- Cold Brook Lake
- Cottonwood Springs Lake
