= Incident at Oglala =

1992 documentary film

- Theatrical release poster
- Directed by: Michael Apted
- Produced by: Arthur Chobanian
- Starring: Norman Zigrossi; Robert Sikma; Darelle Butler; Bob Robideau; Norman Brown; Leonard Peltier
- Narrated by: Robert Redford
- Cinematography: Maryse Alberti
- Edited by: Susanne Rostock
- Distributed by: Miramax Films
- Release date: June 26, 1992
- Running time: 89 minutes
- Country: United States
- Language: English
- Box office: $536,848

Incident at Oglala is a 1992 American documentary film directed by Michael Apted and narrated by Robert Redford. The film documents the deaths of two Federal Bureau of Investigation agents, Jack R. Coler and Ronald A. Williams, on the Pine Ridge Indian Reservation on June 26, 1975. Also killed in the multiple fire was Native American Joe Stuntz, a member of the American Indian Movement (AIM), whose death prompted no legal action.

It examines the legal case surrounding the subsequent trials of Robert Robideau and Dino Butler, and later the separate trial of Leonard Peltier, who had to be extradited from Canada. Robideau and Butler were acquitted at their trial, but Peltier was convicted of murder in 1977. (Peltier's supporters, including the International Indian Treaty Council, maintain that he is innocent of the crimes.) The film also discusses tribal chairman Dick Wilson.

== Background ==
There were many unsolved murders and drive-by shootings on the reservation, caused by a culture clash between traditional and Americanized Sioux. The American Indian Movement (AIM) was invited to the reservation to help assert traditional values. It was headquartered at Calvin Jumping Bull's property on the southern edge of Oglala. The "incident at Oglala" was precipitated by the FBI investigation of a pair of stolen boots. Jimmy Eagle, one of the AIM teenagers, was thought to have taken a pair of boots after a fight, and two FBI agents, wanting to talk to him about it, pursued a vehicle they thought he was driving into the AIM camp, leading to a shootout which left both dead.

== Reception ==
On review aggregator website Rotten Tomatoes, the film holds an approval rating of 100% based on 19 reviews, with an average rating of 7.9/10.

== Accolades ==
Apted was nominated for the Critics Award in 1992 for the film.

== See also ==
- Thunderheart
- Wounded Knee incident
