= Hot Springs, South Dakota =

Hot Springs, South Dakota Mni Kȟáta
- City
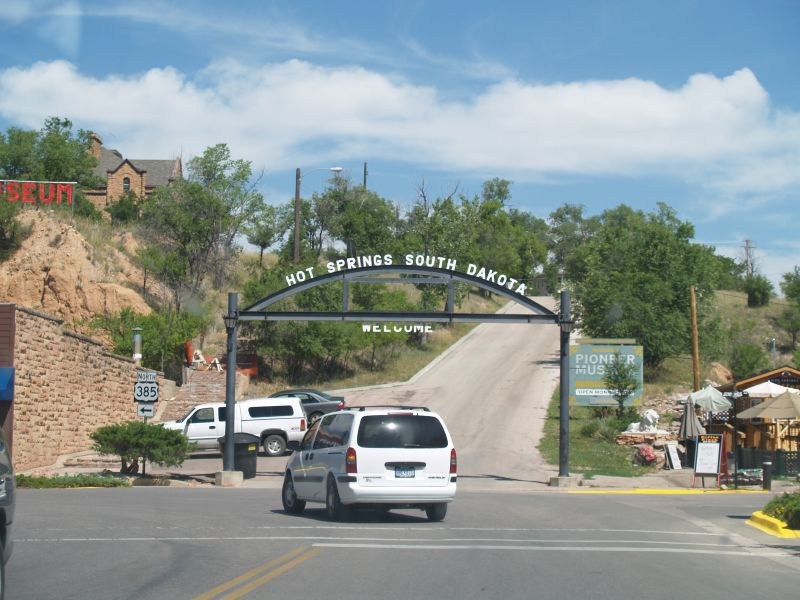
- Welcome Sign in Hot Springs
- Motto: "Southern Gateway to the Black Hills"
- Location in Fall River County and the state of South Dakota
- Coordinates: 43°24′20″N 103°27′32″W
- Country: United States
- State: South Dakota
- County: Fall River
- Incorporated: 1890

Area
  - Total: 4.34 sq mi (11.24 km^{2})
  - Land: 4.34 sq mi (11.24 km^{2})
  - Water: 0 sq mi (0.00 km^{2})
- Elevation: 3,409 ft (1,039 m)

Population (2020)
  - Total: 3,395
  - Density: 782.3/sq mi (302.05/km^{2})
- Time zone: UTC−7 (Mountain (MST))
  - Summer (DST): UTC−6 (MDT)
- ZIP Code: 57747
- Area code: 605
- FIPS code: 46-30220
- GNIS feature ID: 1267427
- Website: City website

Hot Springs (Lakota: mni kȟáta; "hot water") is a city in and the county seat of Fall River County, South Dakota, United States. As of the 2020 census, the city population was 3,395. In addition, neighboring Oglala Lakota County contracts the duties of Auditor, Treasurer and Register of Deeds to the Fall River County authority in Hot Springs.

== Geography ==
Hot Springs is located in Fall River County at the southern edge of South Dakota's Black Hills. The Fall River runs through the city.

According to the United States Census Bureau, the city has a total area of 3.61 square miles (9.35 km^{2}), all land.

== History ==
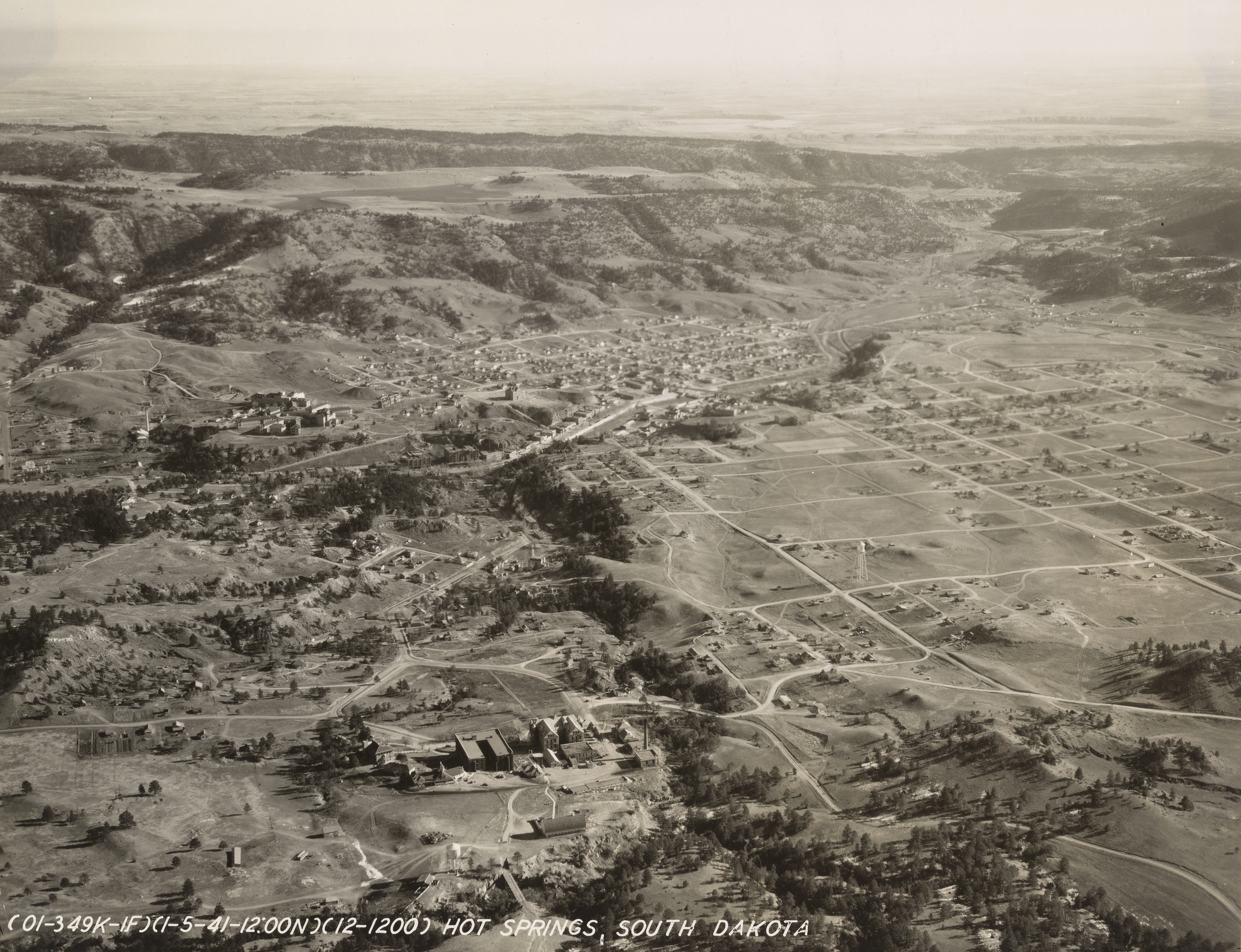
Hot Springs in 1941

The Sioux and Cheyenne people had long frequented the area, appreciating its warm springs. According to several accounts, including a ledger art piece by the Oglala Lakota artist Amos Bad Heart Bull, Native Americans considered the springs sacred. European settlers arrived in the second half of the 19th century. They first named the city "Minnekahta" after its Lakota name. It was renamed Hot Springs in 1882, which is a translation of the Native American name. A variety of health resorts were built on the tourism offered by the springs.

== Tourism ==
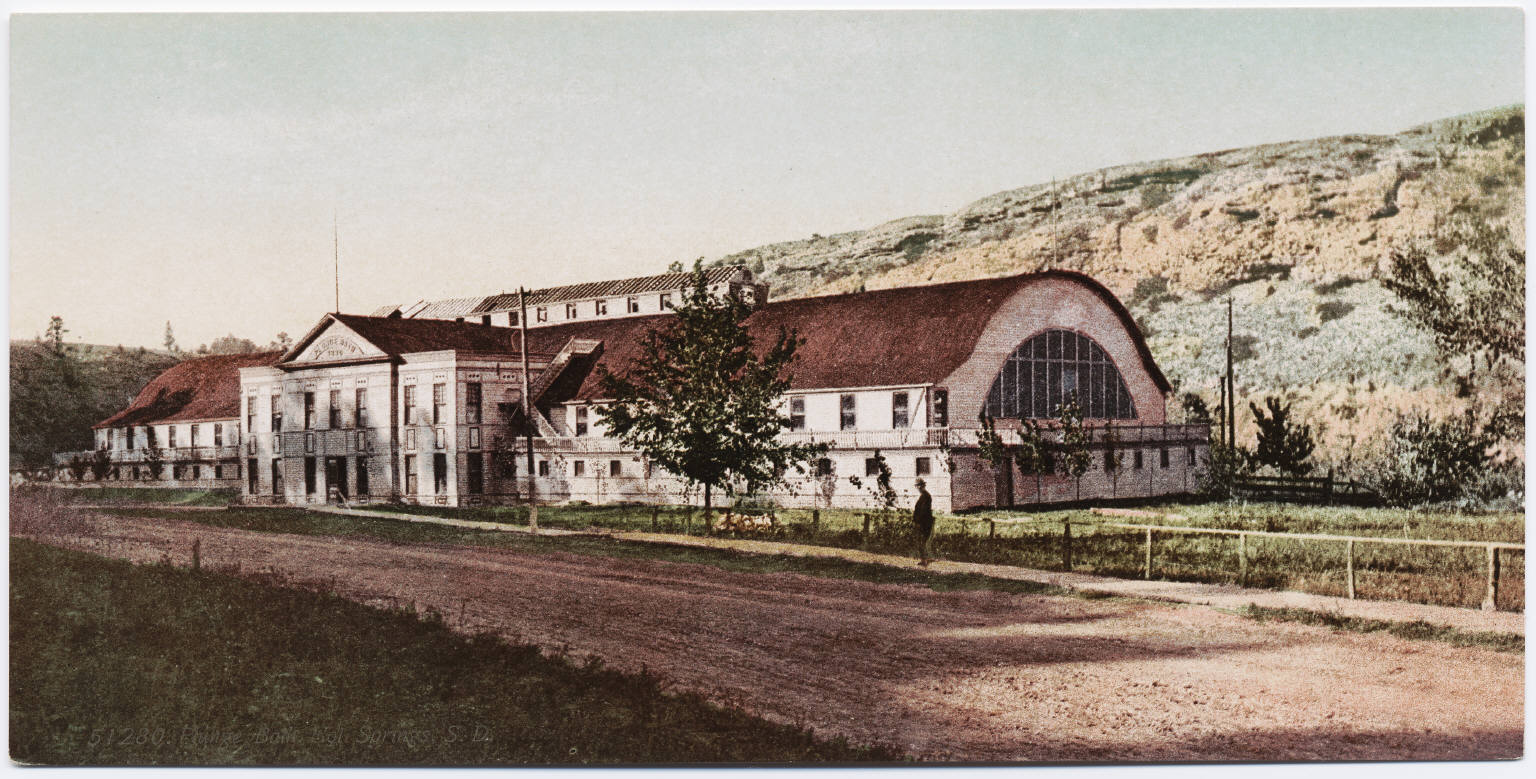
The Evans Plunge in Hot Springs, South Dakota, c. 1900

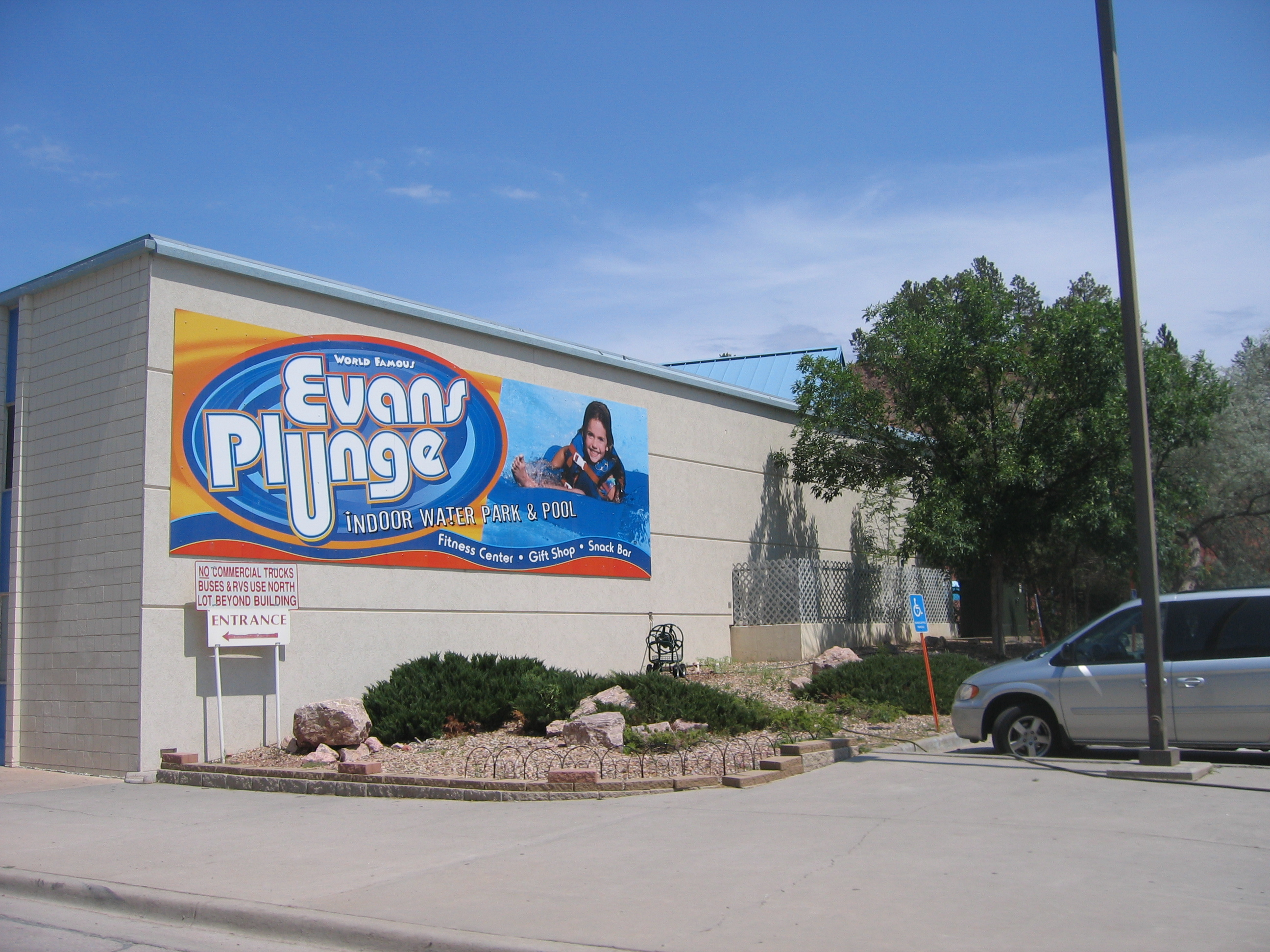
The Evans Plunge in 2007

Attractions in the Hot Springs area include The Mammoth Site, which boasts the world's largest collection of mammoth bones. Along with that are natural hot spring destinations, like Moccasin Springs Spa and Evans Plunge, built in 1890, with its naturally warm 87 °F (31 °C) spring water. The town is also a gateway to the attractions of the southern Black Hills, particularly Wind Cave National Park. Hot Springs holds the annual Miss South Dakota pageant. In recognition of its historic value, the National Trust for Historic Preservation listed Hot Springs as one of its 2009 Dozen Distinctive Destinations. The city center contains over 35 sandstone buildings.

The Angostura Reservoir, a 4,407 acres (17.83 km2) lake is located 10 miles southeast of the city and is a popular fishing, camping, and recreation area. Cold Brook Dam, which creates Cold Brook Lake is a 36-acre lake is located just north of the city, and Cottonwood Springs Dam and lake is located about 5 miles west.

Hot Springs is also the home of a United States Department of Veterans Affairs hospital (Black Hills Healthcare System - Hot Springs Campus), which was designated in 2011 as a National Historic Landmark. Formerly known as the Battle Mountain Sanitarium, the 100-bed center was built in 1907 for patients with rheumatism or tuberculosis. In the early 21st century, it offers extensive outpatient treatment, acute hospital care, PTSD treatment, and an alcohol and drug treatment facility. The Battle Mountain Sanitarium was declared a National Treasure by the National Trust for Historic Preservation following a December 2011 proposal announced by the Department of Veterans Affairs to close the facility. Community and state leaders, including Senator Tim Johnson, Senator John Thune, and Representative Kristi Noem opposed the closing. A concerned group of veterans and citizens organized a "Save the VA" Campaign; they have countered the VA's proposal based on the results of multiple Freedom of Information Act requests, getting as far as meeting with Secretary of Veterans Affairs Eric Shinseki to show how they believe VA leadership manipulated data to justify the proposed closure of the Landmark. After the Veterans Health Administration scandal of 2014, Hot Springs was visited by members of the United States House Committee on Veterans' Affairs for a Congressional field hearing regarding the proposed closure and the committee heard testimony from members of the Save the VA Committee and others opposed to the closure, as well as two VA administrators in favor of the closure.

== Climate ==
Hot Springs has a cool semi-arid climate (Köppen BSk) bordering on a humid continental climate (Dfa/Dwa). Owing to its location in an area particularly prone to chinook winds, Hot Springs is one of the warmest places in South Dakota, with an annual mean temperature of 48.6 °F (9.2 °C). During the three winter months from December to February, twenty-five afternoons can be expected to exceed 50 °F or 10 °C and five winter afternoons will climb to 60 °F or 15.6 °C due to these warm winds. Nonetheless, extreme cold occurs frequently during the winter when the Föhn effect is absent: the average window for minima below or reaching 0 °F or −17.8 °C is from December 3 to February 27, and fifteen mornings get this cold during an average winter, with −20 °F or −28.9 °C reached twice per winter on average. Thirty afternoons each winter stay below 32 °F or 0 °C, with all but seven in the severe month of January 1937 not topping the freezing point.

Snowfall averages 31.1 inches or 0.79 meters – vastly less than the extremely snowy high parts of the Black Hills – due to the very dry winters and relatively warm temperatures. The record for snowfall in a single month was 29.6 inches (0.75 m) in April 2013, and the most in one full season was 72.3 inches (1.8 m) from July 1975 to June 1976; in contrast, the 1988–89 season had less than 11 inches or 0.28 meters of snow all winter. The record for snowfall in a single day was 15.0 inches (0.38 m) on March 12, 2006. The most snow on the ground was 22 inches (0.56 m) on April 18, 1920, and the mean in January peaks at a mere 1.2 inches or 0.030 meters.

Spring warms up early: the first afternoon climbing to 70 °F or 21.1 °C can be expected as early as March 22, and the first 80 °F or 26.7 °C maximum as early as April 22. Spring is usually the wettest season, especially in its later stages, due to occasionally very heavy thunderstorm rains. The wettest month on record was May 1935, which saw 9.65 inches (245.1 mm) of precipitation, whilst the wettest calendar year overall was 1915, with 32.01 inches (813.1 mm), and the driest was 1960, with only 6.15 inches (156.2 mm). The most precipitation in a single day occurred on April 19, 2000, when 4.31 inches (109.5 mm) fell, part of which fell as 10 inches (0.25 m) of snow.

Summers are generally hot, at times uncomfortably so, although mornings tend to be fairly comfortable. On average, only two mornings each year will stay above 20 °C or 68 °F, with only three mornings on record remaining at or above 77 °F or 25 °C, although five afternoons each summer top 100 °F or 37.8 °C and forty afternoons will top 90 °F or 32.2 °C. The hottest temperature ever recorded in Hot Springs is 112 °F (44.4 °C), which was achieved on each of three separate occasions: July 25 of 1931, July 10 of 1933, and July 10 of 1939. The fall season is usually dry and sees increasingly variable temperatures: the first freeze can be expected as early as September 23, but maxima in the eighties Fahrenheit have occurred as late as November 8 (in 1999).

Climate data for Hot Springs, South Dakota (1991-2020 normals, extremes 1894–present)
Month	Jan	Feb	Mar	Apr	May	Jun	Jul	Aug	Sep	Oct	Nov	Dec	Year
Record high °F (°C)	71 (22)	72 (22)	87 (31)	93 (34)	102 (39)	108 (42)	112 (44)	111 (44)	103 (39)	94 (34)	80 (27)	72 (22)	112 (44)
Mean maximum °F (°C)	58.7 (14.8)	61.8 (16.6)	73.7 (23.2)	81.0 (27.2)	88.2 (31.2)	94.9 (34.9)	99.6 (37.6)	97.9 (36.6)	95.3 (35.2)	83.8 (28.8)	70.4 (21.3)	59.3 (15.2)	101.0 (38.3)
Mean daily maximum °F (°C)	40.4 (4.7)	43.3 (6.3)	54.1 (12.3)	61.6 (16.4)	70.2 (21.2)	80.6 (27.0)	88.5 (31.4)	87.5 (30.8)	79.7 (26.5)	64.7 (18.2)	50.5 (10.3)	40.5 (4.7)	63.5 (17.5)
Daily mean °F (°C)	27.3 (−2.6)	29.3 (−1.5)	38.8 (3.8)	46.4 (8.0)	55.8 (13.2)	65.7 (18.7)	72.9 (22.7)	71.3 (21.8)	62.5 (16.9)	49.0 (9.4)	36.6 (2.6)	27.6 (−2.4)	48.6 (9.2)
Mean daily minimum °F (°C)	14.1 (−9.9)	15.4 (−9.2)	23.6 (−4.7)	31.2 (−0.4)	41.4 (5.2)	50.8 (10.4)	57.4 (14.1)	55.2 (12.9)	45.4 (7.4)	33.3 (0.7)	22.7 (−5.2)	14.8 (−9.6)	33.8 (1.0)
Mean minimum °F (°C)	−9.4 (−23.0)	−8.7 (−22.6)	1.9 (−16.7)	15.6 (−9.1)	25.9 (−3.4)	37.6 (3.1)	45.9 (7.7)	43.5 (6.4)	30.6 (−0.8)	15.6 (−9.1)	2.3 (−16.5)	−6.9 (−21.6)	−18.7 (−28.2)
Record low °F (°C)	−41 (−41)	−41 (−41)	−22 (−30)	−11 (−24)	13 (−11)	26 (−3)	36 (2)	28 (−2)	13 (−11)	−18 (−28)	−21 (−29)	−37 (−38)	−41 (−41)
Average precipitation inches (mm)	0.41 (10)	0.57 (14)	1.05 (27)	2.12 (54)	3.28 (83)	3.05 (77)	2.41 (61)	2.00 (51)	1.40 (36)	1.40 (36)	0.43 (11)	0.49 (12)	18.61 (473)
Average snowfall inches (cm)	5.2 (13)	6.3 (16)	5.6 (14)	4.7 (12)	0.4 (1.0)	0.0 (0.0)	0.0 (0.0)	0.0 (0.0)	0.1 (0.25)	1.7 (4.3)	2.5 (6.4)	5.5 (14)	32.0 (81)
Average precipitation days (≥ 0.01 in)	4.1	5.2	5.9	8.3	10.6	9.6	8.2	7.0	5.4	6.1	3.6	4.0	78.0
Average snowy days (≥ 0.1 in)	2.9	3.7	2.3	1.5	0.1	0.0	0.0	0.0	0.0	0.6	1.4	3.1	15.6
Source: NOAA

== Demographics ==
Historical population
Census	Pop.	Note	%±
1890	1,423		—
1900	1,319		−7.3%
1910	2,140		62.2%
1920	2,141		0.0%
1930	3,486		62.8%
1940	4,083		17.1%
1950	5,030		23.2%
1960	4,943		−1.7%
1970	4,434		−10.3%
1980	4,742		6.9%
1990	4,325		−8.8%
2000	4,129		−4.5%
2010	3,711		−10.1%
2020	3,395		−8.5%
U.S. Decennial Census; 2017 Estimate

=== 2020 census ===
As of the 2020 census, Hot Springs had a population of 3,395. The median age was 54.8 years. 16.3% of residents were under the age of 18 and 33.5% of residents were 65 years of age or older. For every 100 females there were 99.1 males, and for every 100 females age 18 and over there were 98.4 males age 18 and over.

0.0% of residents lived in urban areas, while 100.0% lived in rural areas.

There were 1,609 households in Hot Springs, of which 18.1% had children under the age of 18 living in them. Of all households, 36.6% were married-couple households, 27.0% were households with a male householder and no spouse or partner present, and 31.4% were households with a female householder and no spouse or partner present. About 44.1% of all households were made up of individuals and 22.7% had someone living alone who was 65 years of age or older.

There were 1,896 housing units, of which 15.1% were vacant. The homeowner vacancy rate was 4.3% and the rental vacancy rate was 12.5%.

Racial composition as of the 2020 census
Race	Number	Percent
White	2,791	82.2%
Black or African American	29	0.9%
American Indian and Alaska Native	287	8.5%
Asian	32	0.9%
Native Hawaiian and Other Pacific Islander	3	0.1%
Some other race	27	0.8%
Two or more races	226	6.7%
Hispanic or Latino (of any race)	98	2.9%

=== 2010 census ===
As of the census of 2010, there were 3,711 people, 1,730 households, and 910 families residing in the city. The population density was 1,028.0 inhabitants per square mile (396.9/km^{2}). There were 1,958 housing units at an average density of 542.4 per square mile (209.4/km^{2}). The racial makeup of the city was 85.4% White, 1.1% African American, 9.3% Native American, 0.5% Asian, 0.1% Pacific Islander, 0.2% from other races, and 3.5% from two or more races. Hispanic or Latino of any race were 2.1% of the population.

There were 1,730 households, of which 21.0% had children under the age of 18 living with them, 38.4% were married couples living together, 11.0% had a female householder with no husband present, 3.2% had a male householder with no wife present, and 47.4% were non-families. 42.9% of all households were made up of individuals, and 20.3% had someone living alone who was 65 years of age or older. The average household size was 2.03 and the average family size was 2.79.

The median age in the city was 49.8 years. 19.1% of residents were under the age of 18; 5.6% were between the ages of 18 and 24; 18.8% were from 25 to 44; 32.9% were from 45 to 64; and 23.7% were 65 years of age or older. The gender makeup of the city was 50.4% male and 49.6% female.

=== 2000 census ===
As of the census of 2000, there were 4,129 people, 1,704 households, and 962 families residing in the city. The population density was 1,417.3 inhabitants per square mile (547.2/km^{2}). There were 1,900 housing units at an average density of 652.2 per square mile (251.8/km^{2}). The racial makeup of the city was 88.06% White, 0.39% African American, 7.82% Native American, 0.36% Asian, 0.05% Pacific Islander, 0.19% from other races, and 3.12% from two or more races. Hispanic or Latino of any race were 1.91% of the population. There were 1,704 households, out of which 23.5% had children under the age of 18 living with them, 42.0% were married couples living together, 10.8% had a female householder with no husband present, and 43.5% were non-families. 39.8% of all households were made up of individuals, and 17.4% had someone living alone who was 65 years of age or older. The average household size was 2.16 and the average family size was 2.88.

In the city, the population was spread out, with 24.0% under the age of 18, 6.7% from 18 to 24, 19.4% from 25 to 44, 25.7% from 45 to 64, and 24.2% who were 65 years of age or older. The median age was 45 years. For every 100 females, there were 113.3 males. For every 100 females age 18 and over, there were 106.7 males.

As of 2000 the median income for a household in the city was $27,079, and the median income for a family was $35,786. Males had a median income of $28,750 versus $18,333 for females. The per capita income for the city was $16,618. About 8.1% of families and 14.8% of the population were below the poverty line, including 20.9% of those under age 18 and 12.4% of those age 65 or over.

== Notable people ==
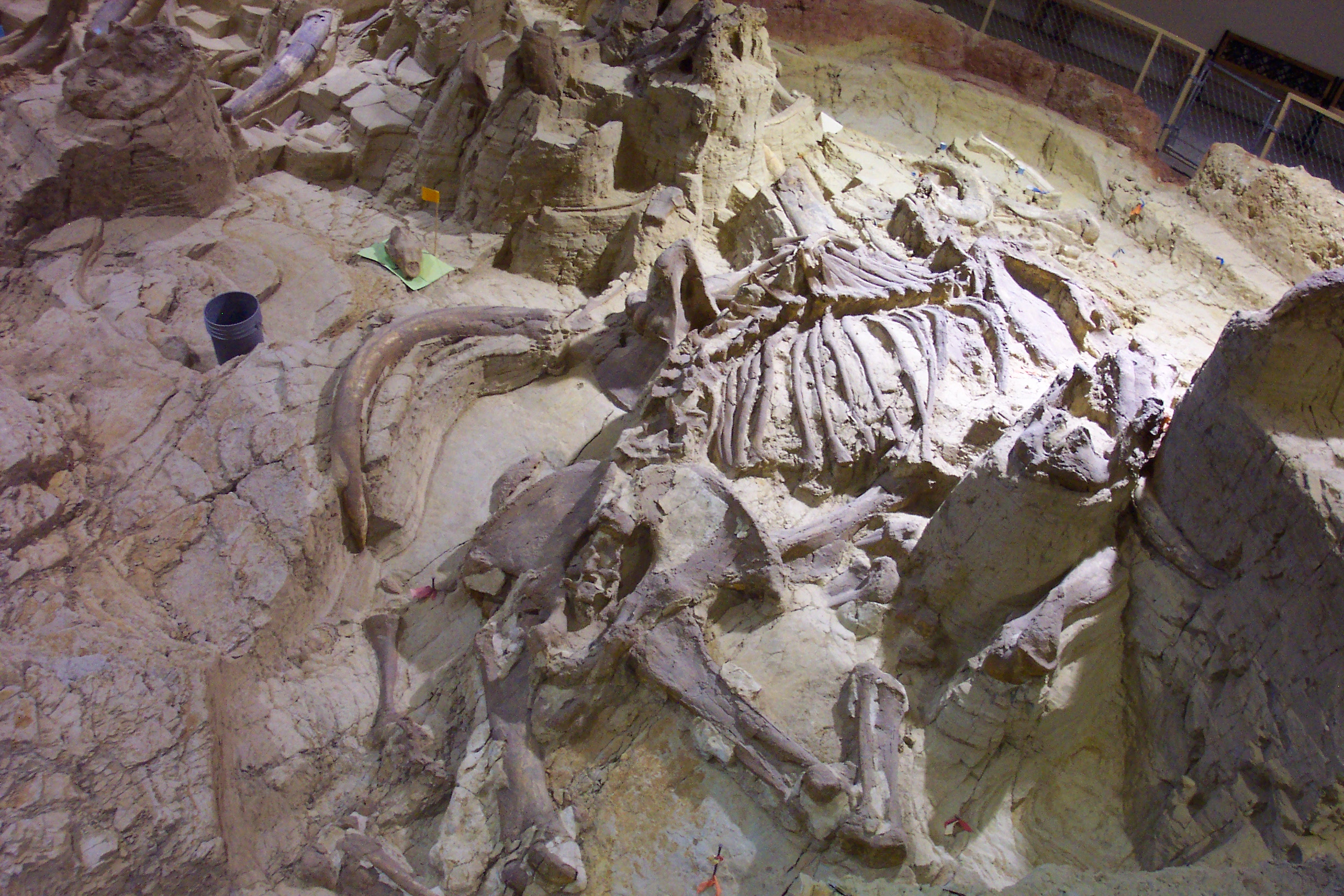
The Mammoth Site, August 2008

- Albert R. Anderson, U.S. representative, mayor of Lead, and lawyer
- Joseph Bottum, writer
- Dan Dryden, educator and politician
- Charles S. Eastman, attorney and member of the South Dakota House of Representatives
- Jarrod Emick, musical theater actor
- Orlando Ferguson, proponent of the Flat Earth Theory
- Charles Hargens, painter
- Leslie Jensen, 15th governor of South Dakota
- Jacqueline Left Hand Bull, Continental Counselor and Chair of the National Spiritual Assembly of the Bahá'ís of the United States
- Jess Thomas, American operatic tenor

== See also ==
- List of cities in South Dakota
