= Pactola, South Dakota =

Pactola, South Dakota Camp Crook
- Ghost town
- Location of Pactola within South Dakota.
- Coordinates: 44.0735982°N 103.4838007°W
- Country: United States
- State: South Dakota
- County: Pennington
- Founded: 1876
- Founder: General Crook
- Named for: Pactolus
- Elevation: 4,462 ft (1,360 m)
- Time zone: UTC-7 (MST)
  - Summer (DST): UTC-6 (MDT)

Pactola, also known as Camp Crook, (1875–1950s) is a ghost town in Pennington County, South Dakota, United States. It was an early placer mining town and existed into the early 1950s, when it was submerged under Pactola Lake.

== Etymology ==
The town's early name, Camp Crook, was named in honor of George Crook, who started his headquarters there. Pactola was chosen as the community name in 1878, when the miners were asked by lawyer and journalist H. N. Maguire to find a more interesting name. Pactola is derived from the Ancient Greek placer mining operations on the Pactolus River.

== History ==
The Rapid City Mining District was founded in July 1875. The Black Hills at this time belonged to the Lakota people. These miners founded Camp Crook, in honor of General Crook, who they were hiding from. In August 1875, they were discovered and removed from the Black Hills. After this, the town was used as a headquarters for General Crook as he began chasing miners away from the Black Hills, who were in violation of the Treaty of Fort Laramie. The miners returned after the hills were opened in February 1876. Claims along the river were quickly filed and filled up. Some of these claims were made for as much as $50,000. In March, a party of 80 men who had been passing through were stranded in the town by a blizzard. The leader of the party, James C. Sherman, decided to stay in the town in the hopes of gaining wealth from gold. To serve the placer deposits, a long flume was built. The town was booming by late 1876. About 300 miners lived in the area. A store opened the same year, and in 1877, one of the first post offices in the Black Hills was established. The Black Hills & Western Railroad soon laid tracks to Pactola. The first hotel in the Black Hills, known as the Sherman House, was founded that same year by Sherman. This hotel became a stage station along two different stage lines.

Several companies tried to build more flumes and ditches to the creek, but the expenses were unaffordable. Eventually, the town dwindled and became largely abandoned. Before its complete destruction, only one of the first buildings had survived. New buildings around the site included a lodge, some cabins, and one store. The town was submerged under Pactola Lake in the early 1950s. Only one cabin survived the flooding and stands downstream of the lake.

== Geography ==
Pactola was located in the Black Hills of Pennington County, South Dakota. Pactola Lake is now over the town site, beside U.S. Route 385 and 11 miles (18 km) north of Hill City. Before its flooding, the town was located in a meadow near Rapid Creek.
