= Cold Brook Dam =

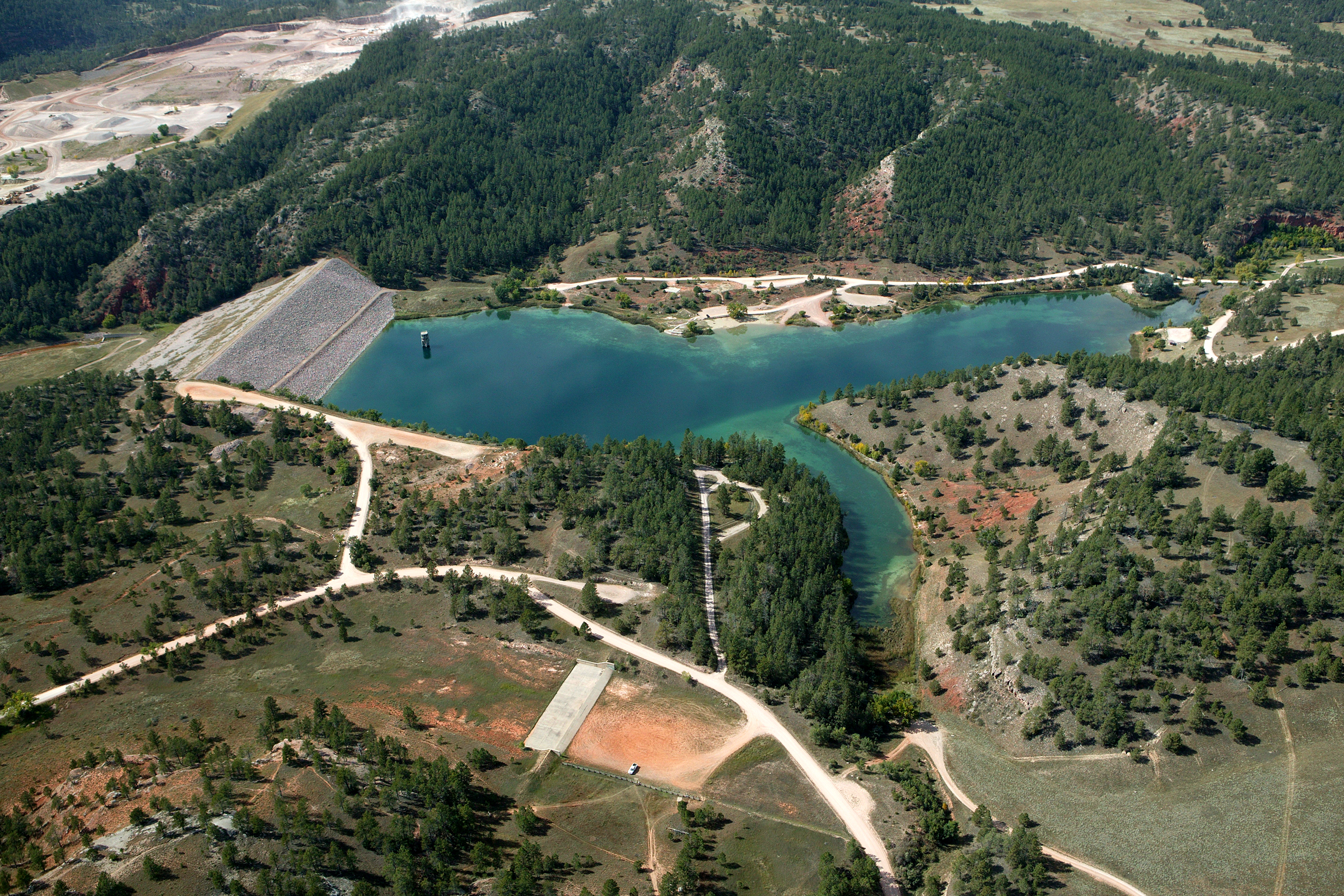
- Aerial view of Cold Brook Lake and Dam

- Location within South Dakota
- Country: United States
- Location: Fall River County, South Dakota
- Coordinates: 43°27′15″N 103°29′21″W
- Status: Operational
- Opening date: 1953
- Owners: U.S. Army Corps of Engineers, Omaha District

Dam and spillways
- Type of dam: Embankment
- Impounds: Cold Brook Creek
- Height: 127 ft (39 m)
- Width (crest): 925 ft (282 m)

Reservoir
- Creates: Cold Brook Lake
- Total capacity: 7,200 acre⋅ft (8,900,000 m^{3})
- Surface area: 36 acres (15 ha)
- Normal elevation: 3,553 ft (1,083 m)
- Website; U.S. Army Corps of Engineers, Omaha District

Cold Brook Dam is an earthen dam located near Hot Springs, South Dakota, in Fall River County in the southwestern part of the state, in the southern Black Hills.

The earthen dam was constructed in 1953 by the United States Army Corps of Engineers with a height of 127 feet (39 m) and a length at its crest of 925 feet (282 m). It impounds Cold Brook Creek, a tributary of the Cheyenne River for flood control purposes during flash flood events for nearby Hot Springs. The dam is owned and operated by the Corps of Engineers, Omaha District.

The reservoir it creates, Cold Brook Lake, has a water surface of 36 acres (15 ha) and has a maximum capacity of 7,200 acre-feet (8,900,000 m^{3}). Year-round recreation is possible and includes canoeing, fishing, swimming, wildlife viewing, camping, and (in the winter) ice fishing, skating, and cross-country skiing. Cold Brook Lake Recreation Area includes a boat ramp, picnic area, swim beach and campground is managed by the Corps of Engineers.

Cottonwood Springs Dam, another Corps of Engineers dam is located about 5 miles to the southwest.
