= Deerfield Dam =

Dam in South Dakota, U.S.

- Location within South Dakota
- Country: United States
- Location: Black Hills National Forest in Pennington County, South Dakota
- Coordinates: 44°01′46″N 103°47′05″W
- Purpose: Irrigation and Municipal Water Supply
- Status: Operational
- Construction began: 1942
- Opening date: 1947
- Built by: United States Bureau of Reclamation

Dam and spillways
- Impounds: Castle Creek
- Height: 171 ft (52 m)

Reservoir
- Creates: Deerfield Reservoir
- Surface area: 414 acres (168 ha)
- Normal elevation: 5,902 ft (1,799 m)

Deerfield Dam is a dam impounding Castle Creek in the Black Hills of South Dakota. The dam creates Deerfield Reservoir within the Black Hills National Forest.

The earthen dam was originally built by the United States Bureau of Reclamation in 1942–1947, with a height of 171 feet (52 m), to store irrigation water for the surrounding Pennington County. Construction was started in July 1942 by the Farm Security Administration, and later continued by the Civilian Conservation Corps under the Works Projects Administration during World War II. Employment of conscientious objectors under the Civilian Public Service here drew complaints from locals.

The reservoir has a capacity of 15,700 acre-feet (19,400,000 m^{3}) and covers 414 acres (168 ha) of surface. Along with providing irrigation and recreation such as ice fishing and ice skating, the reservoir also supplements the municipal water supply of Rapid City, South Dakota and for the nearby Ellsworth Air Force Base.

Today, several recreational areas and campgrounds operated by the National Forest Service offer public recreational opportunities to the lake area.
