= Pactola Lake =

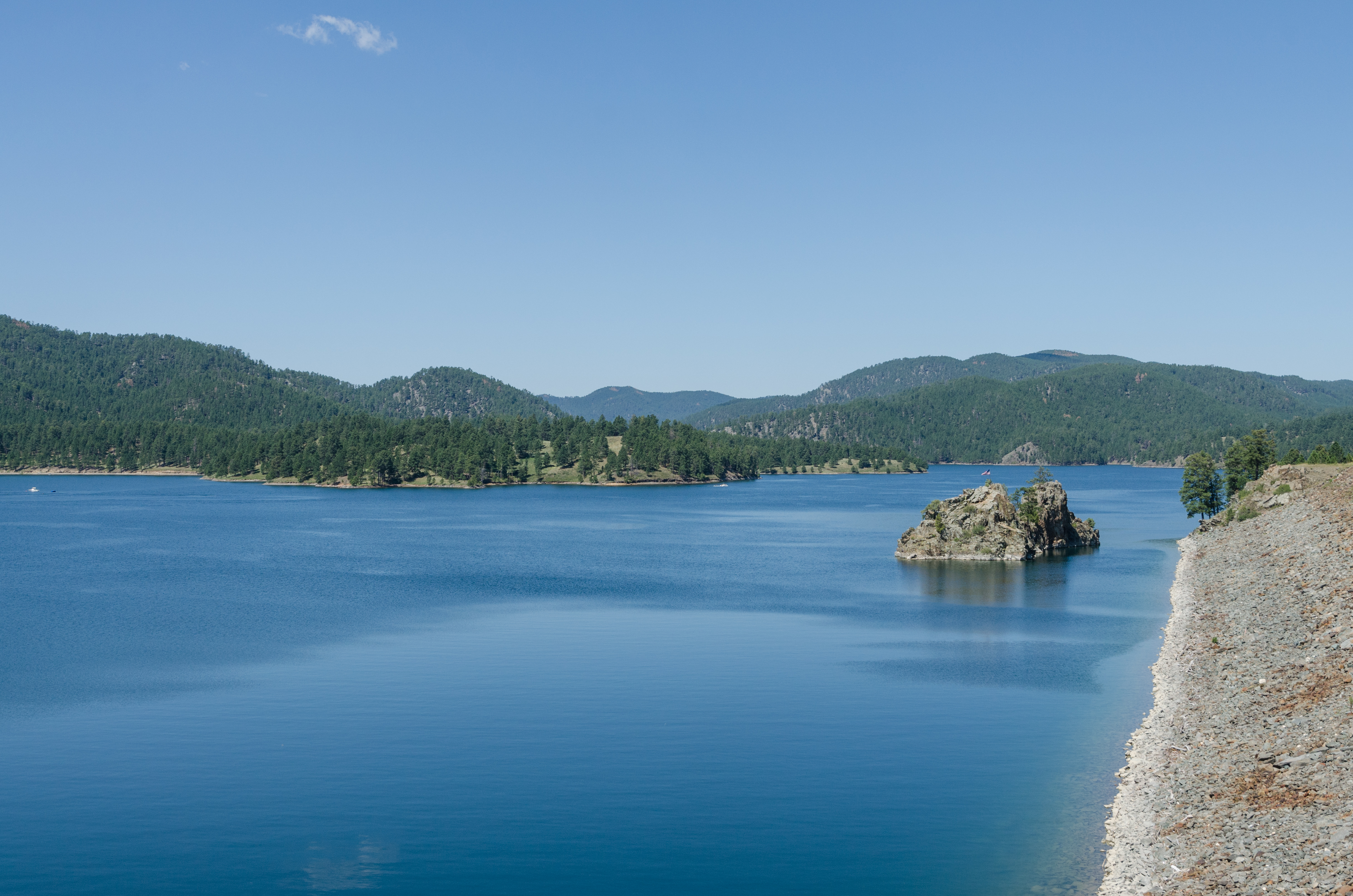

- Location within South Dakota Location within the United States
- Location: Pennington County, South Dakota
- Coordinates: 44°04′23″N 103°29′35″W
- Type: reservoir
- Basin countries: United States
- Surface area: 800 acres (3.2 km^{2})
- Average depth: 55 ft (17 m)
- Max. depth: 150 ft (46 m)
- Water volume: 54,000 to 94,000 acre⋅ft (67 to 116 hm^{3})
- Shore length^{1}: 14 mi (23 km)
- Surface elevation: 4,655 ft (1,419 m) above sea level at the top of the spillway
- ^{1} Shore length is not a well-defined measure.

Pactola Lake is the largest and deepest reservoir in the Black Hills, located 15 miles (24 km) west of Rapid City, South Dakota, United States. Constructed in 1952, the dam and waters are managed by the Bureau of Reclamation, with the surrounding land managed by the US Forest Service as part of Black Hills National Forest, which operates a visitor center located on the south side of the dam. Facilities include campgrounds, hiking trails, picnic areas, cliffs, and a beach.

== History ==
Pactola Dam was built in 1952 by federal authorities to provide Rapid City with a new water supply, following the related construction of Deerfield Dam in 1945. The new reservoir inundated the mining town of Pactola, and construction was completed in 1956 after the movement of more than 4.3 million cubic yards (3.3×10^{6} m^{3}) of embankment fill. Severe thunderstorms in 1972 that caused flooding in Rapid City led to dam modifications to ensure safety, with further safety modifications in 1987.

== Ecology ==
Many fish live in Pactola Lake, including lake and brown trout as well as perch and bass. An invasive zebra mussel infestation was detected in the summer of 2022.

== Recreation ==
Visitors can go boating, camping, swimming, and hiking. The lake is popular with fishermen, and scuba divers can see the limited remains of the town of Pactola.

== See also ==
- List of South Dakota lakes
- List of lakes
