= National Register of Historic Places listings in Meade County, South Dakota =

Location of Meade County in South Dakota

This is a list of the National Register of Historic Places listings in Meade County, South Dakota.

This is intended to be a complete list of the properties and districts on the National Register of Historic Places in Meade County, South Dakota, United States. The locations of National Register properties and districts for which the latitude and longitude coordinates are included below, may be seen in a map.

There are 32 properties and districts listed on the National Register in the county, including 1 National Historic Landmark.

This National Park Service list is complete through NPS recent listings posted August 1, 2025.

== Current listings ==
	Name on the Register	Image	Date listed	Location	City or town	Description
1	Archeological Site No. 39MD20		August 6, 1993 (#93000798)	Address restricted	Tilford	
2	Archeological Site No. 39MD81		April 14, 1994 (#93000818)	Address restricted	Sturgis	
3	Archeological Site No. 39MD82		April 14, 1994 (#93000797)	Address restricted	Sturgis	
4	Joseph Baker House		April 30, 1986 (#86000942)	County Road 19A; 44°24′11″N 102°50′53″W	Hereford	
5	L.L. Bartlett House		April 30, 1986 (#86000946)	County Road 26; 44°42′57″N 102°38′50″W	Stoneville	
6	Bear Butte	Bear Butte	June 19, 1973 (#73001746)	Northeast of Sturgis; 44°28′25″N 103°25′33″W	Sturgis	
7	Bethel Lutheran Church		April 30, 1986 (#86000941)	Main and 5th Sts. 45°01′10″N 102°02′19″W	Faith	
8	Black Hawk Elementary School		April 30, 1986 (#86000939)	Main and Elm Sts. 44°09′04″N 103°18′35″W	Blackhawk	
9	Black Hills National Cemetery	Black Hills National Cemetery	May 17, 2016 (#16000258)	20901 Pleasant Valley Dr. 44°22′11″N 103°28′28″W	Sturgis	
10	Covered Wagon Resort		November 20, 2007 (#07001213)	14189 County Road 79; 44°13′01″N 103°22′23″W	Piedmont	
11	Erskine School	Erskine School	August 16, 1984 (#84003354)	Sherman St. 44°24′45″N 103°30′52″W	Sturgis	
12	John and Coralin Evans Ranch		April 30, 1986 (#86000943)	County Road 4; 44°13′54″N 103°19′16″W	Piedmont	
13	Fort Meade National Historic District	Fort Meade National Historic District	May 22, 1973 (#73001747)	East of Sturgis on Highway 34; 44°24′46″N 103°28′22″W	Sturgis	
14	Fort Meade Veterans Administration Hospital		May 29, 2018 (#100002467)	113 Comanche Rd. 44°24′44″N 103°28′11″W	Fort Meade	
15	Frozenman Stage Station		June 18, 1992 (#92000691)	Address restricted	Bison	
16	Stephen and Maria Graf House	Stephen and Maria Graf House	October 31, 2002 (#02001283)	1233 Main St. 44°24′52″N 103°30′49″W	Sturgis	
17	H O Ranch Log House		June 21, 1990 (#90000954)	3 miles west of Marcus; 44°39′49″N 102°20′10″W	Marcus	
18	Ole and Carris Johnson Ranch		April 30, 1986 (#86000938)	County Road 7; 44°08′57″N 103°16′21″W	Blackhawk	
19	John and Elsie McMillan House	John and Elsie McMillan House	October 30, 2015 (#15000765)	1611 Davenport St. 44°24′30″N 103°30′29″W	Sturgis	
20	Minneapolis Brewing Company Beer Warehouse		February 9, 2001 (#01000100)	Highway 212; 45°01′24″N 102°02′07″W	Faith	
21	Municipal Building-City Hall		June 22, 2000 (#00000722)	206 Main St. 45°01′20″N 102°02′18″W	Faith	Architect U.L. Freed. Now the Municipal Bar/Liquor Store.
22	Elias B. Olsen Ranch		April 30, 1986 (#86000940)	County Road 6; 44°17′06″N 102°34′56″W	Elm Springs	
23	Jacob and Elizabeth Raskob Ranch		April 30, 1986 (#86000945)	Highway 34; 44°28′12″N 103°20′54″W	Sturgis	
24	Royal Center School		February 21, 2023 (#100008632)	Northwest corner of intersection of Sulphur Cutoff and Stoneville Rds. 44°54′27″N 102°39′17″W	Opal vicinity	
25	South Dakota Dept. of Transportation Bridge No. 47-151-389		December 9, 1993 (#93001263)	Local road over Bear Butte Creek; 44°28′33″N 103°15′58″W	Sturgis	Replaced in 2010
26	Stevens Ranch		April 30, 1986 (#86000944)	County Road 4; 44°13′59″N 103°18′30″W	Piedmont	
27	Stomprude Trail Ruts		June 18, 1992 (#92000690)	Address restricted	Bison	
28	Sturgis Commercial Block	Sturgis Commercial Block	June 20, 1975 (#75001719)	1000-1028 Main St. 44°24′50″N 103°30′33″W	Sturgis	
29	Sturgis High School	Sturgis High School	August 16, 2000 (#00000998)	1425 Cedar St. 44°24′35″N 103°31′16″W	Sturgis	
30	Sturgis Water Works Company Supply Works Site		December 6, 2016 (#16000827)	2835 Davenport St. 44°21′41″N 103°30′58″W	Sturgis	
31	Annie Tallent House	Annie Tallent House	May 28, 1976 (#76001746)	1603 Main St. 44°24′53″N 103°31′01″W	Sturgis	
32	John G. Wenke House	John G. Wenke House	May 28, 1976 (#76001747)	1340 Junction Ave. 44°24′39″N 103°30′30″W	Sturgis	

== Former listings ==
	Name on the Register	Image	Date listed	Date removed	Location	City or town	Description
1	South Dakota Dept. of Transportation Bridge No. 47-215-363		December 9, 1993 (#93001303)	December 15, 1999	SD 34 over the Belle Fourche R.	Sturgis vicinity	
2	Poker Alice Tubbs House		June 5, 1975 (#75001720)	May 29, 1990	N. Junction St.(Original location: Now located at:); 44°24′23″N 103°30′31″W	Sturgis	Delisted in 1990 after being relocated to Sturgis.

== See also ==
- List of National Historic Landmarks in South Dakota
- National Register of Historic Places listings in South Dakota
