= South Dakota Highway 79 =

State highway in South Dakota, United States

Highway 79
- SD 79 highlighted in red

Route information
- Maintained by SDDOT
- Length: 209 mi (336 km)

Major junctions
- South end: US 18 / US 385 at Maverick Junction
- I-90 / US 14 from Rapid City to Sturgis; I-190 / US 16 in Rapid City; US 212 in Newell; SD 20 in Reva
- North end: ND 22 at the North Dakota state line, south of Reeder, ND

Location
- Country: United States
- State: South Dakota
- Counties: Fall River; Custer; Pennington; Meade; Butte; Harding

Highway system
- South Dakota State Trunk Highway System; Interstate; US; State
← SD 75	→ US 81

South Dakota Highway 79 (SD 79) is a 209-mile (336 km) state highway in western South Dakota, United States, that runs from Maverick Junction near the Black Hills National Forest to the North Dakota state line.

== Route description ==
SD 79's southern terminus is at Maverick Junction near Hot Springs, where it meets US 18 and US 385. SD 79 runs east of the Black Hills to Rapid City, where it joins US Route 16 Truck Bypass around the east side of Rapid City up to Interstate 90. The road continues north and runs concurrently with US 14 and Interstate 90 westbound toward Sturgis. Leaving Sturgis, SD 79 leads to Bear Butte State Park and briefly runs concurrently with U.S. Route 212 south of Newell. Near North Dakota, the highway passes through the South Dakota portion of Custer National Forest. SD 79 then joins SD 20 for a short concurrent run, and finally turns northward until it reaches North Dakota.

== Major intersections ==
County	Location	mi	km	Exit	Destinations	Notes
Fall River	Maverick Junction	0.0	0.0		US 18 / US 385 – Hot Springs, Oelrichs, Edgemont	Southern terminus
Custer		32.0	51.5		SD 36 west – Custer, Custer State Park, Crazy Horse, Mount Rushmore	
Custer	Hermosa	32.8	52.8		SD 40 west – Keystone	Southern end of SD 40 concurrency
Custer	Hermosa	33.0	53.1		SD 40 east – Hermosa	Northern end of SD 40 concurrency
Pennington	Rapid City	50.4	81.1	—	US 16 Truck west	Southern end of US 16 Truck concurrency; single point urban interchange (SPUI)
Pennington	Rapid City	53.2	85.6	—	SD 44 – Rapid City	
Pennington	Rapid City	56.0	90.1	61	I-90 east / US 14 east / US 16 Truck ends – Sioux Falls	Northern end of US 16 Truck concurrency; southern end of I-90/US 14 concurrency; SPUI
Pennington	Rapid City	57.3	92.2	60	I-90 BL west (North Street) – Rapid City	SPUI
Pennington	Rapid City	58.6	94.3	59	La Crosse Street – Rapid City	
Pennington	Rapid City	59.5	95.8	58	Haines Avenue – Rapid City	SPUI
Pennington	Rapid City	60.1	96.7	57	I-190 south / US 16 west – Rapid City, Mount Rushmore, Black Hills National Forest	Trumpet interchange; I-190 exits 1A–B
Pennington	Rapid City	62.2	100.1	55	Deadwood Avenue – Rapid City	
Meade	Black Hawk	65.4	105.3	52	I-90 BL east (Peaceful Pines Road) – Black Hawk, Rapid City	
Meade	Piedmont	69.4	111.7	48	Stagebarn Canyon Road – Piedmont	
Meade	Piedmont	71.7	115.4	46	Elk Creek Road – Piedmont, Summerset	
Meade	Piedmont	73.2	117.8	44	Bethlehem Road – Piedmont	
Meade	Tilford	77.6	124.9	40	Tilford Road, Bethlehem Road – Tilford	
Meade		80.8	130.0	37	Pleasant Valley Road	
Meade		83.0	133.6	34	Black Hills National Cemetery	
Meade	Sturgis	85.4	137.4	32	I-90 BL west (Junction Avenue) – Sturgis	
Meade	Sturgis	87.5	140.8	30	I-90 west / US 14 west / I-90 BL begins / US 14A west / SD 34 west – Sturgis, Deadwood, Lead, Gillette	Northern end of I-90/US 14 concurrency; southern end of SD 34 concurrency
Meade		92.4	148.7		SD 34 east – Union Center	Northern end of SD 34 concurrency
Butte		111.2	179.0		US 212 west – Belle Fourche	Southern end of US 212 concurrency
Butte	Newell	114.2	183.8		US 212 east – Mud Butte, Faith	Northern end of US 212 concurrency
Butte		131.6	211.8		SD 168 to US 85	
Harding		180.5	290.5		SD 20 west – Buffalo	Southern end of SD 20 concurrency
Harding		184.9	297.6		SD 20 east – Prairie City, Bison	Northern end of SD 20 concurrency
Harding		213.7	343.9		ND 22 north – Reeder	Northern terminus; continuation into North Dakota
1.000 mi = 1.609 km; 1.000 km = 0.621 mi: Concurrency terminus

== See also ==
- List of state highways in South Dakota
