= Rapid City metropolitan area =

Rapid City, SD Metropolitan Statistical Area
- Metropolitan Statistical Area
- Mount Rushmore near Keystone
Map of Rapid City–Spearfish, SD CSA
Rapid City
Rapid City, SD MSA
Spearfish, SD µSA
- Coordinates: 44°04′17″N 103°13′15″W
- Country: United States
- State: South Dakota
- Largest city: Rapid City
- Other cities: Spearfish; Sturgis; Deadwood

Area
  - Total: 16,181 sq mi (41,910 km^{2})

Population (2020)
  - Total: 139,074
  - Estimate (2022): 145,159
  - Rank: US: 279th
  - Density: 23.23/sq mi (8.971/km^{2})
- Time zone: UTC−7 (MST)
  - Summer (DST): UTC−6 (CDT)
- Area code: 605

The Rapid City, SD metropolitan area, as defined by the United States Census Bureau. Anchored by the city of Rapid City, the area corresponds to the entirety of Pennington and Meade counties in the state of South Dakota, though the Rapid City market area extends well beyond those counties and into Nebraska, Montana, Wyoming, and North Dakota. The population was 139,074 at the 2020 census. According to the 2024 census estimates, the MSA has a population of 156,227.

== Counties ==
- Custer
- Meade
- Pennington

== Communities ==
=== Places with more than 75,000 inhabitants ===
- Rapid City (Principal city)

=== Places with 2,000 to 20,000 inhabitants ===
- Blackhawk (census-designated place)
- Box Elder
- Ellsworth AFB (former census-designated place)
- Piedmont
- Rapid Valley (census-designated place)
- Sturgis
- Summerset

=== Places with 750 to 2,000 inhabitants ===
- Colonial Pine Hills (census-designated place)
- Green Valley (census-designated place)
- Hill City

=== Places with less than 750 inhabitants ===
- Ashland Heights (census-designated place)
- Blucksberg Mountain
- Buffalo Chip
- Caputa
- Faith
- Johnson Siding
- Keystone
- New Underwood
- Quinn
- Wall
- Wasta

=== Unincorporated places ===
- Owanka
- Rockerville
- Scenic
- Silver City
- Three Forks
- Wicksville

== Demographics ==
Historical population
Census	Pop.	Note	%±
1880	2,244		—
1890	11,180		398.2%
1900	10,517		−5.9%
1910	25,093		138.6%
1920	22,087		−12.0%
1930	31,561		42.9%
1940	33,534		6.3%
1950	45,569		35.9%
1960	70,239		54.1%
1970	75,967		8.2%
1980	91,078		19.9%
1990	103,221		13.3%
2000	112,818		9.3%
2010	126,382		12.0%
2020	139,074		10.0%
2024 (est.)	156,227		12.3%
U.S. Decennial Census; 2020 Census

=== 2020 census ===
As of the 2020 census, there were 139,074 people and 58,790 households in the MSA.

=== 2010 census ===
The ethnic makeup of the MSA, according to the 2010 census, was the following:

- 85.26% White
- 8.19% Native American
- 1.08% Black
- 0.96% Asian
- >0.01% Native Hawaiian or Pacific Islander
- 3.63% Two or more races
- 0.80% Other races
- 3.63% Hispanic or Latino (of any race)

As of the 2010 census, there were 126,382 people, 51,154 households, and 33,390 families residing in the MSA. The population density was 20.2 people per square mile (7.8/km^{2}). There were 55,949 housing units at an average density of 8.9 per square mile (3.4/km^{2}). 27.9% were of German, 7.2% Irish, 6.7% Norwegian, and 5.2% English ancestry.

There were 51,154 households, out of which 32.0% had children under the age of 18 living with them, 49.2% were married couples living together, 11.2% had a female householder with no husband present, and 34.7% were non-families. 28.0% of all households were made up of individuals, and 9.4% had someone living alone who was 65 years of age or older. The average household size was 2.45 and the average family size was 2.93.

=== 2000 census ===
As of the 2000 census, there were 112,818 people, 43,446 households, and 29,978 families residing within the MSA. The racial makeup of the MSA was 87.98% White, 0.99% African American, 6.79% Native American, 0.82% Asian, 0.06% Pacific Islander, 0.67% from other races, and 2.69% from two or more races. Hispanic or Latino of any race were 2.53% of the population.

The median income for a household in the MSA was $37,239, and the median income for a family was $42,667. Males had a median income of $28,590 versus $21,029 for females. The per capita income for the MSA was $18,309.

== See also ==
- South Dakota census statistical areas
