= Wonderland Homes, South Dakota =

- Census-designated place
- Location within South Dakota Location within the United States
- Coordinates: 44°12′9″N 103°20′34″W
- Country: United States
- State: South Dakota
- County: Meade

Area
  - Total: 0.24 sq mi (0.62 km^{2})
  - Land: 0.24 sq mi (0.61 km^{2})
  - Water: 0 sq mi (0.00 km^{2})
- Elevation: 3,609 ft (1,100 m)

Population (2020)
  - Total: 718
  - Density: 3,033/sq mi (1,170.9/km^{2})
- Time zone: UTC-7 (Mountain (MST))
  - Summer (DST): UTC-6 (MDT)
- ZIP Code: 57718 (Summerset)
- Area code: 605
- FIPS code: 46-72590
- GNIS feature ID: 2807116

Wonderland Homes is an unincorporated, developed "neighborhood" community in Meade County, South Dakota, United States, consisting of numerous homes in subdivisional layout and several small businesses. Its origins are unknown, as is its relationship to other places or real estate development businesses called "Wonderland Homes". It is in the southwest part of Meade county, on the eastern edge of the Black Hills. It is bordered to the southwest by the town of Summerset and to the north by the town of Piedmont, to which towns it is sometimes connected as might be a subdivision. Exit 48 on Interstate 90 is 0.5 miles (1 km) to the west; I-90 leads northwest 17 miles (27 km) to Sturgis, the county seat, and southeast 11 miles (18 km) to Rapid City.

The United States Census Bureau utilizes the neighborhood called Wonderland Homes as a census-designated place (CDP) for statistics-keeping purposes, not assigning it to any adjacent organized community. It was first listed as a CDP prior to the 2020 census. The population of the CDP was 718 at the 2020 census.

== CDP-limited Demographics ==
Historical population
| Census | Pop. | Note | %± |
|---|---|---|---|
| 2020 | 718 | | — |
U.S. Decennial Census

== Education ==
It is in Meade School District 46-1.
