= Plainview, South Dakota =

Unincorporated community in South Dakota, United States

- Unincorporated community
- Location within South Dakota Location within the United States
- Coordinates: 44°36′8″N 102°9′42″W
- Country: United States
- State: South Dakota
- County: Meade
- Time zone: UTC-7 (Mountain (MST))
  - Summer (DST): UTC-6 (MDT)
- ZIP Code: 57748

Plainview is an unincorporated community in Meade County, in the U.S. state of South Dakota.

== History ==
Plainview was laid out in 1907, and named for the "plain view" obtained from the elevated town site. A post office called Plainview was established in 1908, and remained in operation until 1972. The community is no longer directly listed on the US Census.

== Geography ==
Plainview is centered at the intersection of South Dakota Highway 34 and Meade County Highway 39T, locally known as Plainview Road. The community is roughly halfway between Rapid City and Pierre.

Plainview is located in a very rural part of the Great Plains, where only two roads traverse the entire town. The nearest other settlement is fellow unincorporated community Howes, South Dakota, and the closest large settlement is Sturgis. Air transport is also limited; the closest airport with commercial service is Rapid City Regional Airport at 71 miles away.

=== Climate ===
According to the Köppen Climate Classification system, Plainview has a cold semi-arid climate, abbreviated "BSk" on climate maps. The hottest temperature recorded in Plainview was 114 °F (45.6 °C) on July 16, 2006, while the coldest temperature recorded was −34 °F (−36.7 °C) on December 30, 1990.

Climate data for Plainview, South Dakota, 1991–2020 normals, extremes 1974–present
Month	Jan	Feb	Mar	Apr	May	Jun	Jul	Aug	Sep	Oct	Nov	Dec	Year
Record high °F (°C)	71 (22)	74 (23)	85 (29)	97 (36)	101 (38)	110 (43)	114 (46)	111 (44)	108 (42)	97 (36)	85 (29)	72 (22)	114 (46)
Mean daily maximum °F (°C)	31.4 (−0.3)	35.3 (1.8)	46.6 (8.1)	57.8 (14.3)	68.1 (20.1)	78.5 (25.8)	86.5 (30.3)	85.9 (29.9)	76.7 (24.8)	60.2 (15.7)	45.5 (7.5)	33.7 (0.9)	58.9 (14.9)
Daily mean °F (°C)	19.3 (−7.1)	22.7 (−5.2)	33.1 (0.6)	43.8 (6.6)	54.6 (12.6)	65.1 (18.4)	72.1 (22.3)	70.5 (21.4)	61.0 (16.1)	45.9 (7.7)	32.3 (0.2)	22.0 (−5.6)	45.2 (7.3)
Mean daily minimum °F (°C)	7.2 (−13.8)	10.0 (−12.2)	19.4 (−7.0)	29.7 (−1.3)	41.1 (5.1)	51.6 (10.9)	57.6 (14.2)	55.1 (12.8)	45.2 (7.3)	31.6 (−0.2)	19.0 (−7.2)	10.4 (−12.0)	31.5 (−0.3)
Record low °F (°C)	−28 (−33)	−33 (−36)	−26 (−32)	−3 (−19)	19 (−7)	33 (1)	35 (2)	38 (3)	22 (−6)	−4 (−20)	−18 (−28)	−34 (−37)	−34 (−37)
Average precipitation inches (mm)	0.33 (8.4)	0.45 (11)	0.91 (23)	1.89 (48)	3.19 (81)	2.93 (74)	2.44 (62)	1.41 (36)	1.15 (29)	1.59 (40)	0.44 (11)	0.38 (9.7)	17.11 (433.1)
Average snowfall inches (cm)	5.0 (13)	5.1 (13)	8.8 (22)	8.1 (21)	0.9 (2.3)	0.0 (0.0)	0.0 (0.0)	0.0 (0.0)	0.0 (0.0)	3.4 (8.6)	4.1 (10)	7.1 (18)	42.5 (107.9)
Average precipitation days (≥ 0.01 in)	3.9	3.7	5.1	7.3	9.4	9.7	7.0	5.1	4.3	4.8	3.2	3.3	66.8
Average snowy days (≥ 0.1 in)	3.0	2.7	3.2	2.0	0.1	0.0	0.0	0.0	0.0	0.8	2.1	2.7	16.6
Source 1: NOAA
Source 2: National Weather Service

== Demographics ==
=== Political affiliation ===
Plainview is located in a staunchly-Republican supporting area, as according to The New York Times and its "Extremely Detailed Map of the 2020 Election", Plainview and neighboring community Howes are part of a precinct where 28 out of a total 33 votes went to GOP incumbent president Donald Trump over Democratic nominee Joe Biden.
