= Stoneville =

Stoneville may refer to:

In the United States

- Stoneville, Mississippi
- Stoneville, North Carolina
- Stoneville, South Dakota

Elsewhere

- Stoneville, Western Australia, Australia
- Stoneville, Newfoundland and Labrador, Canada
