= Fairpoint =

Fairpoint may refer to:

- Fairpoint, Ohio
- Fairpoint, South Dakota
- FairPoint Communications
