= White Owl (disambiguation) =

White Owl is a brand of cigars.

White Owl or white owl may refer to:

== Animals ==
- Snowy owl, also known as the white owl
- Western barn owl, also known as the white owl
- Neorina patria, a butterfly also known as a white owl

== Other uses ==
- White Owl, South Dakota, an unincorporated rural village
- White Owl Social Club, a bar and restaurant in Portland, Oregon
- The White Owl, a short film part of the Secrets of Nature series
- White Owl, an imprint of Pen and Sword Books
- The White Owl, a painting by William James Webbe
- White Owl, an album by Keiko Matsui
- Aaron "White Owl" Collins, a former member of the band Skarhead

== See also ==
- "The Great White Owl", a poem by Celia Thaxter
- "The Great White Owl", an alias of comic book character Cassandra Nova
- Smokin' White Owl, a dragster car
