= George Alt =

American politician (1886–1993)

Member of the South Dakota House of Representatives
- In office 1935–1938

Personal details
- Born: January 9, 1886 Minnesota, U.S.
- Died: March 12, 1993 (aged 107) Rapid City, South Dakota
- Party: Republican
- Spouse: Esther Babcock
- Children: 3

George Alt (January 9, 1886 – March 12, 1993) was an American politician. He served as a Republican member of the South Dakota House of Representatives.

== Life and career ==
Alt was born in Minnesota.

In 1935, Alt was elected to the South Dakota House of Representatives, representing Meade County, South Dakota, serving until 1938.

Alt died in March 1993 at the Rapid City Care Center, at the age of 107.
