= Elm Springs =

Elm Springs may refer to:

- Elm Springs, Arkansas, a city
- Elm Springs, South Dakota, an unincorporated community
- Elm Springs (house), historic building in Tennessee
