= Mud Butte, South Dakota =

Unincorporated community in South Dakota, United States

Mud Butte
- Unincorporated community
- Location within the state of South Dakota Mud Butte (the United States)
- Coordinates: 45°0′17″N 102°52′40″W
- Country: United States
- State: South Dakota
- County: Meade

Government
  - Mayor: Andy Kovalik
- Elevation: 2,871 ft (875 m)

Population (2000)
  - Total: 19
- Time zone: UTC-7 (Mountain (MST))
  - Summer (DST): UTC-6 (MDT)
- ZIP codes: 57758
- Area code: 605
- GNIS feature ID: 1256574

Mud Butte is a former village, now a diffuse unincorporated community, located in northern Meade County, South Dakota, United States. It roughly lies along U.S. Route 212, 55 miles northeast of the city of Sturgis. Its elevation is 2,871 feet (875 m). Mud Butte lies within ZIP code 57758, which is served by the post office at Opal.

== History ==
Mud Butte was named from a barren butte nearby that had the color of dark mud. A rare Tyrannosaurus skeleton was found at Mud Butte in the 1980s.
