= National Motorcycle Museum =

There are National Motorcycle Museums in a number of countries. Some of the better known are:

- National Motorcycle Museum (UK), Solihull, West Midlands, England.
- National Motorcycle Museum (Anamosa, Iowa), Anamosa, Iowa, USA.
- Sturgis Motorcycle Museum & Hall of Fame in Sturgis, South Dakota
