= White Owl, South Dakota =

Unincorporated community in South Dakota, United States

White Owl
- Unincorporated community
- Location within the state of South Dakota White Owl (the United States)
- Coordinates: 44°35′32″N 102°25′51″W
- Country: United States
- State: South Dakota
- County: Meade
- Established: 1890
- Named for: White Owl Creek
- Elevation: 2,792 ft (851 m)
- Time zone: UTC-7 (Mountain (MST))
  - Summer (DST): UTC-6 (MDT)
- ZIP codes: 57792
- Area code: 605
- FIPS code: 46-71260
- GNIS feature ID: 1258970

White Owl (also Whiteowl) is an unincorporated rural village in east central Meade County, South Dakota, United States, with a population of 61 as of the 2010 census. It lies along Highway 34, 55 miles (89 km) east of the city of Sturgis, the county seat and was established in 1890, and opened as the first post office in Meade County in 1893. Its elevation is 2,792 feet (851 m). The village has a fashion boutique, a Baptist church, a Community Center, a graveyard, and a post office, with the ZIP code of 57792.

The community took its name from nearby White Owl Creek.
