= Haydraw, South Dakota =

Unincorporated community in South Dakota, United States

Coordinates: 44°26′42″N 102°43′19″W

Haydraw is an unincorporated community in Meade County, in the U.S. state of South Dakota.

== History ==
A post office called Haydraw was established in 1910, and remained in operation until 1954. The community was named for its location within a hay-growing district.
