= U.S. Route 14 in South Dakota =

Section of U.S. Route in South Dakota, United States

U.S. Highway 14
- US 14 highlighted in red; US 14A in blue

Route information
- Maintained by SDDOT
- Length: 440 mi (710 km)
- Existed: 1926–present

Major junctions
- West end: I-90 / US 14 at the Wyoming state line near Beulah, WY
- US 85 in Spearfish; US 14A in Spearfish; US 14A in Sturgis; I-190 / US 16 in Rapid City; I-90 near Wall; US 83 from Fort Pierre to Blunt; US 281 in Wolsey; US 81 in Arlington; I-29 in Brookings
- East end: US 14 at the Minnesota state line near Elkton

Location
- Country: United States
- State: South Dakota
- Counties: Lawrence, Meade, Pennington, Jackson, Haakon, Stanley, Hughes, Hyde, Hand, Beadle, Kingsbury, Brookings

Highway system
- United States Numbered Highway System; List; Special; Divided; South Dakota State Trunk Highway System; Interstate; US; State
← SD 13	→ SD 15

U.S. Highway 14 (US 14) is a part of the United States Numbered Highway System that travels from Yellowstone National Park in Wyoming, to Chicago, Illinois. In the state of South Dakota, US 14 runs from the Wyoming border east to the Minnesota border.

== Route description ==
The South Dakota section of US 14 enters the state from Wyoming concurrent with Interstate 90 (I-90). It passes through Spearfish, Sturgis, Rapid City, and Wall, before leaving I-90. US 14 then passes through Philip, Midland, Pierre, Highmore, Miller, Wolsey, Huron, De Smet, Arlington, and Brookings, then leaving the state at the Minnesota state line.

US 14A winds through the northern part of the scenic Black Hills, taking travelers from Sturgis to Spearfish.

The Laura Ingalls Wilder Historic Highway incorporates US 14 from De Smet in the west to Rochester, Minnesota, in the east.

US 14 and US 83 serve Pierre, one of only four state capitals not on the Interstate Highway System.

The South Dakota section of US 14 is legally defined at South Dakota Codified Laws § 31-4-134.

== History ==
The segment of US 14 in South Dakota was previously part of the Black and Yellow Trail linking Chicago, Illinois, to Yellowstone National Park.

== Major intersections ==
County	Location	mi	km	Destinations	Notes
Lawrence		0.00	0.00	I-90 west / US 14 west – Gillette	Continuation into Wyoming
See I-90
Pennington	Wall	112.30	180.73	I-90 east – Sioux Falls	Eastern end of I-90 concurrency
Jackson	No major junctions				
Haakon	Philip	142.57	229.44	SD 73 (North Larimer Street) – Faith, Kadoka	
Haakon	Midland	168.37	270.97	SD 63 south to I-90	West end of concurrency with SD 63
Stanley		190.03	305.82	SD 34 west / SD 63 north / Lewis and Clark Trail – Sturgis, Eagle Butte	East end of concurrency with SD 63; west end of concurrency with SD 34 and Lewis and Clark Trail
Stanley	Fort Pierre	226.86	365.10	SD 1806 north	West end of SD 1806 concurrency
Stanley	Fort Pierre	227.75	366.53	US 83 south / SD 1806 south / Lewis and Clark Trail / Yellowstone Street	East end of SD 1806 and Lewis and Clark Trail concurrency; west end of US 83 concurrency
Hughes	Pierre	229.13	368.75	US 14 Truck east / US 83 Truck north / SD 34 east (East Sioux Avenue) / Lewis and Clark Trail	East end of concurrency with SD 34; west end of concurrency with Lewis and Clark Trail; western and southern terminus of US 14 Truck and US 83 Truck, respectively
Hughes	Pierre	230.69	371.26	SD 1804 north / Lewis and Clark Trail	East end of concurrency with Lewis and Clark Trail; southern terminus of SD 1804
Hughes	Pierre	233.99	376.57	US 14 Truck south / US 83 Truck south (North Garfield Avenue)	Eastern and northern terminus of US 14 Truck and US 83 Truck, respectively
Hughes		246.63	396.91	US 83 north – Onida	East end of US 83 concurrency
Hyde	Highmore	278.04	447.46	SD 47 to SD 26 – Fort Thompson	
Hand		289.96	466.65	CR 5 south – Ree Heights	
Hand	Miller	300.40	483.45	SD 45 north to US 212	Western end of SD 45 concurrency
Hand	Miller	301.22	484.77	SD 45 south – Gann Valley	Eastern end of SD 45 concurrency
Beadle		326.39	525.27	US 281 north – Redfield	West end of US 281 concurrency
Beadle		333.55	536.80	US 281 south – Plankinton	East end of US 281 concurrency
Beadle		339.53	546.42	CR 15 – Broadland	
Beadle	Huron	345.68	556.32	SD 37 to US 212 / SD 34	
Beadle		356.59	573.88	CR 31 north – Yale	
Kingsbury	Manchester	370.48	596.23	CR 14 – Bancroft, Carthage	
Kingsbury	De Smet	378.63	609.35	SD 25 to US 212 – Howard	
Kingsbury		395.40	636.33	CR 9 – Hetland, Oldham	
Kingsbury	Arlington	400.74	644.93	US 81 north – Watertown	West end of US 81 concurrency
Brookings	Arlington	403.09	648.71	US 81 south – Madison	East end of US 81 concurrency
Brookings		407.05	655.08	CR 11 south – Sinai	
Brookings		415.17	668.15	CR 7 north – Bruce	
Brookings	Brookings	418.15	672.95	US 14 Byp. east to I-29	
Brookings	Brookings	421.90	678.98	I-29 – Sioux Falls, Watertown	Interchange
Brookings	Brookings	423.24	681.14	US 14 Byp. west – Arlington	
Brookings		425.49	684.76	CR 23 south – Aurora	
Brookings		427.50	687.99	CR 25 north – Bushnell, White	
Brookings		430.69	693.13	SD 13 south – Flandreau	Northern terminus of SD 13
Brookings		439.75	707.71	US 14 east – Lake Benton	Continuation into Minnesota
1.000 mi = 1.609 km; 1.000 km = 0.621 mi: Concurrency terminus

== Special routes ==
South Dakota has three current special routes of US 14: an alternate route from Spearfish to Sturgis, a business loop in Huron, and a bypass route in Brookings. There is also a former business loop in Rapid City and a former truck route in Pierre.

== See also ==
U.S. Route 14
Previous state: Wyoming	South Dakota	Next state: Minnesota
