= Blucksberg Mountain, South Dakota =

- Unincorporated community
- Location within South Dakota Location within the United States
- Coordinates: 44°21′34″N 103°27′14″W
- Country: United States
- State: South Dakota
- County: Meade

Area
  - Total: 0.67 sq mi (1.73 km^{2})
  - Land: 0.67 sq mi (1.73 km^{2})
  - Water: 0 sq mi (0.00 km^{2})
- Elevation: 3,885 ft (1,184 m)

Population (2020)
  - Total: 467
  - Density: 699/sq mi (269.7/km^{2})
- Time zone: UTC-7 (Mountain (MST))
  - Summer (DST): UTC-6 (MDT)
- Area code: 605
- GNIS feature ID: 2584547

Blucksberg Mountain is an unincorporated community and census-designated place in Meade County, South Dakota, United States. Its population was 467 as of the 2020 census. Interstate 90 passes through the community.

== Geography ==
According to the U.S. Census Bureau, the community has an area of 0.668 square miles (1.73 km^{2}), all land.

== Demographics ==
Historical population
Census	Pop.	Note	%±
2020	467		—
U.S. Decennial Census

== Education ==
It is in Meade School District 46-1.
