= Dalzell, South Dakota =

Unincorporated community in South Dakota, United States

Coordinates: 44°20′37″N 102°23′48″W

Dalzell is an unincorporated community in Meade County, in the U.S. state of South Dakota.

== History ==
A post office called Dalzell was established in 1893, and remained in operation until 1953. According to the Federal Writers' Project, the origin of the name Dalzell is obscure.
