= Redowl, South Dakota =

Unincorporated community in South Dakota, U.S.

Coordinates: 44°41′52″N 102°33′12″W

Redowl is an unincorporated community in Meade County, in the U.S. state of South Dakota.

== History ==
A post office called Redowl was established in 1908. The community takes its name from nearby Red Owl Creek.
