= Interstate 90 in South Dakota =

Highway in South Dakota

Interstate 90
- Purple Heart Memorial Highway
- I-90 highlighted in red

Route information
- Maintained by SDDOT
- Length: 412.76 mi (664.27 km)
- NHS: Entire route

Major junctions
- West end: I-90 / US 14 at the Wyoming state line near Beulah, WY
- US 85 / I-90 BL in Spearfish; I-190 / US 16 in Rapid City; US 14 near Wall; US 83 / I-90 BL in Murdo; US 83 / SD 53 in Vivian; US 183 / I-90 BL in Presho; US 281 in Plankinton; US 81 near Salem; I-29 in Sioux Falls; I-229 in Sioux Falls
- East end: I-90 at the Minnesota state line near Valley Springs

Location
- Country: United States
- State: South Dakota
- Counties: Lawrence, Meade, Pennington, Jackson, Jones, Lyman, Brule, Aurora, Davison, Hanson, McCook, Minnehaha

Highway system
- Interstate Highway System; Main; Auxiliary; Suffixed; Business; Future; South Dakota State Trunk Highway System; Interstate; US; State
← SD 89	→ SD 100

Interstate 90 (I-90) in the US state of South Dakota traverses east–west through the southern half of the state, passing through the cities of Spearfish, Rapid City, Mitchell, and Sioux Falls.

== Route description ==
I-90 enters South Dakota in Lawrence County as a four-lane divided highway. It enters concurrently with US Highway 14 (US 14) and passes through the town of Spearfish, where it shares another concurrency with US 85 from exit 10 to exit 17. From there it passes several miles north and east of the tourist town of Deadwood before entering Meade County, going just to the west of Sturgis. Another concurrency is with South Dakota Highway 34 (SD 34) from exit 23 at Whitewood to exit 30, the west exit of Sturgis, where there starts a concurrency with SD 79. The freeway generally passes along the north and east edges of the Black Hills.

The route then enters Pennington County, where it passes through the northern edge of Rapid City, gateway to the Black Hills and the nearest passing to Mount Rushmore National Memorial, as well as other scenic attractions including Custer State Park and the Needles Highway. Rapid City is also where the interstate has its westernmost auxiliary route, I-190, which links the Interstate to the western edge of the downtown area. SD 79's concurrency ends at exit 61 on the east side of the city. From Rapid City, the route heads east, passing between Box Elder to the south and Ellsworth Air Force Base to the north before heading toward Wall on to Jackson County. Exits 110 and 131 for Badlands National Park to the south (SD 240) are within 15 miles (24 km) either way of the county line. The concurrency for US 14 ends at exit 112 just east of Wall; here, US 14 runs due east and will connect to the city of Philip and the capital city of Pierre.

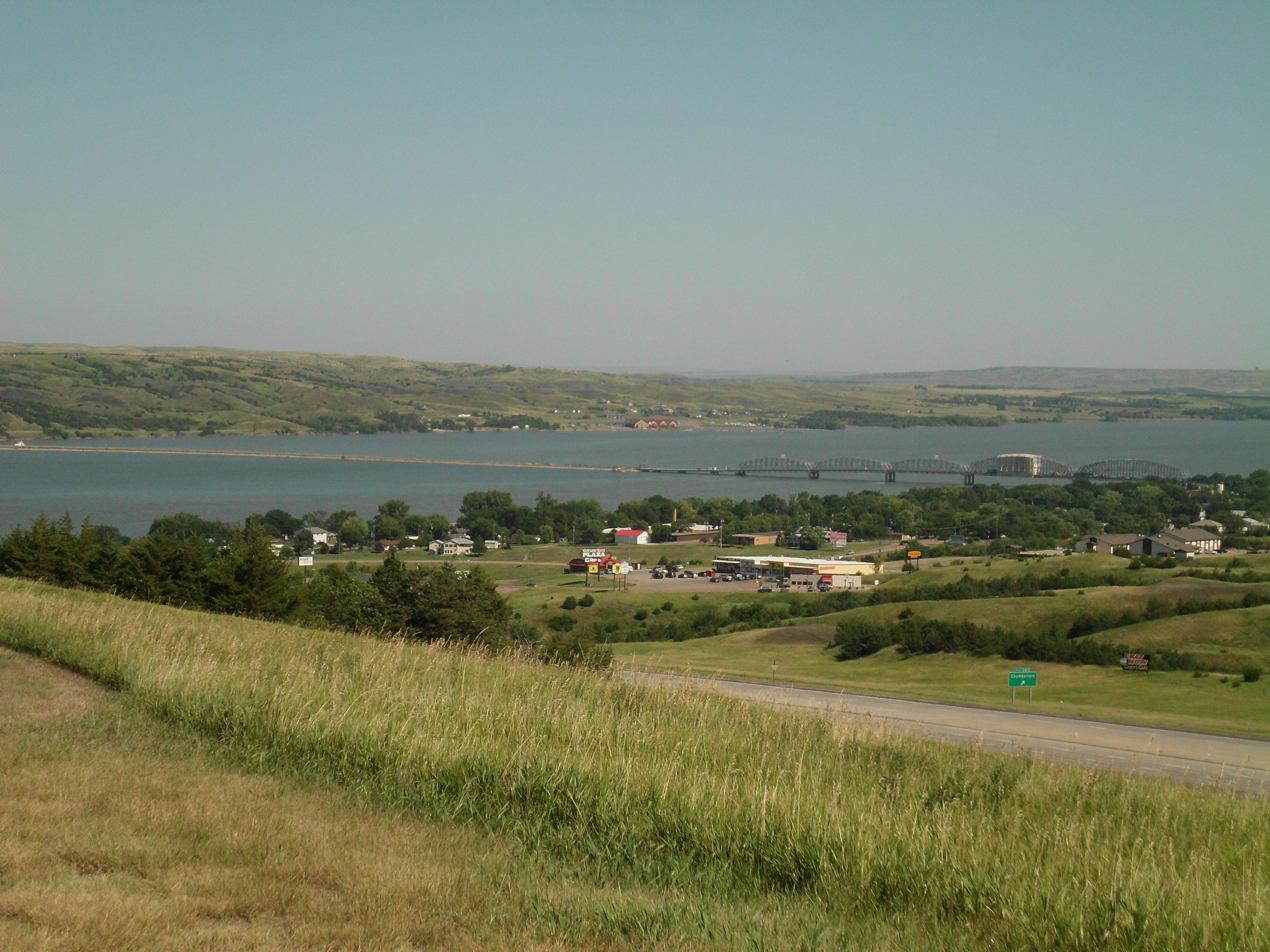
The Lake Francis Case portion of the Missouri River viewed from a rest stop just south of Chamberlain; the pre-Interstate Chamberlain Bridge is in the center

From there, the route passes mostly east–west through Jackson and Jones counties. There are short concurrencies with SD 73 (from the west entering Kadoka) and SD 63 in Jackson County. I-90 crosses the Central–Mountain timezone boundary on the west edge of Jones County between milemarkers 174 and 175. Then, at Murdo, a concurrency begins with US 83 at exit 192 and continues to exit 212. It is in Lyman County, at exit 212 in Vivian, that the highway provides its closest link to the capital of Pierre, along US 83, some 35 miles (56 km) north. The road crosses the Missouri River at Lake Francis Case, between the towns of Oacoma and Chamberlain, also crossing into Brule County. I-90 Business (I-90 Bus.) runs from exit 260 at Oacoma to downtown Chamberlain across the Missouri River on the nearby Chamberlain Bridge and returns to I-90 at exit 265. Beginning there is a short concurrency with SD 50 heading to Pukwana, and also in Brule County is another short concurrency with SD 45 starting at Kimball.

I-90 then continues through Aurora County (connecting to White Lake and Plankinton), Davison County (where Mt. Vernon, Mitchell, and the Corn Palace are located), Hanson County (Alexandria), and McCook County (Salem). Then comes the state's most populous county, Minnehaha. After passing the communities of Humboldt and Hartford, the Interstate intersects the only other major Interstate in the state, I-29, at Sioux Falls, the largest city. Just east of I-29 is where I-90 meets the northern terminus of I-229. East of Brandon and northeast of Valley Springs, it then ends its trip through South Dakota of 413 miles (665 km) before entering Minnesota and Rock County, just west of the towns of Beaver Creek and Manley.

Since April 2015, the speed limit is 80 mph (130 km/h) between Rapid City and the Minnesota state line, except for the segment between Marion Road and Veterans Parkway in Sioux Falls, where the speed limit is 65 mph (105 km/h). The speed limit remains 75 mph (121 km/h) between Rapid City and the Wyoming state line.

=== Codified law ===
The South Dakota section of I-90 is defined at South Dakota Codified Laws § 31-4-184.

=== Transit ===
Jefferson Lines provides intercity bus service along the length of I-90 in South Dakota serving seven communities along the route with major transfer points at the Sioux Falls Bus Station and in Vivian.

== History ==
I-90 was constructed in the 1960s and 1970s. The four-lane Interstate replaced old US 16 as the main road connecting Rapid City and Sioux Falls. Much of Old US 16 remains intact; however, I-90 has absorbed sections and likewise has reshaped the economies of many southern South Dakota towns. Driver-oriented businesses and hotels opened near new exits on I-90, along with roadside attractions to attract tourists. The final section of I-90 in the state opened in November 1976 between the Wyoming state line and Spearfish.

In the city of Box Elder, exit 66, which crossed SD 435, was closed on October 1, 2003, after a 10-month delay. The exit was closed and removed as a result of the South Dakota Department of Transportation (SDDOT)'s efforts to move traffic away from a potential crash site at the end of the Ellsworth AFB runway. The partial cloverleaf interchange of exit 66 was also demolished shortly thereafter. Exit 67, which was constructed not too long before the closure of exit 66, is now used as the main entrance and exit feeder to the base, and it is less likely to be impacted by a potential crash. Local citizens and officials feared the lack of entrances which access the Ellsworth AFB would cause traffic issues and moving businesses from near the old exit would cause some to close and affect tax revenue. Land near exit 66 began to be purchased in 2004, including the former McDonald's property.

On May 24, 2012, the South Dakota Transportation Commission declared the entire length of I-90 as part of the National Purple Heart Trail, naming it the Purple Heart Memorial Highway, named after the military decoration of the same name.

== Exit list ==
County	Location	mi	km	Exit	Destinations	Notes
Lawrence	North Lawrence	0.00	0.00		I-90 west / US 14 west – Gillette	Continuation into Wyoming
Lawrence	North Lawrence	2.25	3.62	2	McNenny State Fish Hatchery	
Lawrence	Spearfish	8.96	14.42	8	McGuigan Road – Spearfish, Black Hills National Forest	
Lawrence	Spearfish	10.26	16.51	10	I-90 BL east (North Avenue) / US 85 north – Spearfish, Belle Fourche	Western end of US 85 concurrency
Lawrence	Spearfish	12.32	19.83	12	Jackson Boulevard – Spearfish, Black Hills State University	
Lawrence	Spearfish	14.42	23.21	14	I-90 BL west / US 14A (27th Street) / Black Hills National Forest Scenic Byway – Spearfish Canyon	Single-point urban interchange (SPUI)
Lawrence	Spearfish	18.16	29.23	17	US 85 south – Deadwood, Lead	Eastern end of US 85 concurrency
Lawrence	Whitewood	23.73	38.19	23	SD 34 west – Whitewood, Belle Fourche	Western end of SD 34 concurrency
Meade	Sturgis	30.28	48.73	30	I-90 BL / SD 34 east / SD 79 north (Lazelle Street) / US 14A west – Sturgis, Deadwood, Lead	Eastern end of SD 34 concurrency; western end of SD 79 concurrency
Meade	Sturgis	32.41	52.16	32	I-90 BL west (Junction Avenue) – Sturgis	Serves Sturgis Regional Hospital
Meade	Southwest Meade	34.81	56.02	34	Black Hills National Cemetery	
Meade	Southwest Meade	37.01	59.56	37	Pleasant Valley Road	
Meade	Tilford	40.20	64.70	40	Tilford Road, Bethlehem Road – Tilford	
Meade	Piedmont	44.66	71.87	44	Bethlehem Road, Deerview Road – Piedmont	
Meade	Piedmont	46.14	74.26	46	Elk Creek Road – Piedmont, Summerset	
Meade	Summerset	48.43	77.94	48	Stagebarn Canyon Road, Stage Stop Road – Summerset	
Meade	Black Hawk	52.38	84.30	52	I-90 BL east (Peaceful Pines Road) – Black Hawk, Rapid City	
Pennington	Rapid City	55.66	89.58	55	Deadwood Avenue – Rapid City	
Pennington	Rapid City	57.76	92.96	57	I-190 south / US 16 west – Rapid City, Mount Rushmore, Black Hills National Forest	Trumpet interchange; I-190 exits 1A–B
Pennington	Rapid City	58.31	93.84	58	Haines Avenue – Rapid City	SPUI
Pennington	Rapid City	59.19	95.26	59	La Crosse Street – Rapid City	Diverging diamond interchange (DDI)
Pennington	Rapid City	60.48	97.33	60	I-90 BL west (North Street) – Rapid City	SPUI
Pennington	Rapid City	61.84	99.52	61	US 16 Truck / SD 79 south – Rapid City, Mount Rushmore, Crazy Horse	Eastern end of SD 79 concurrency; SPUI
Pennington	Box Elder	63.42	102.06	63	Box Elder, Ellsworth AFB Commercial Gate	Eastbound exit and westbound entrance; to be reconstructed into a diverging diamond interchange
Pennington	Box Elder	66.17	106.49	66	SD 435 – Ellsworth AFB	Closed October 1, 2003
Pennington	Box Elder	67.15	108.07	67	Liberty Boulevard – Box Elder, Ellsworth AFB Main Gate	Signed as exits 67A (south) and 67B (north) eastbound; partial cloverleaf interchange
Pennington	New Underwood	78.29	126.00	78	161st Avenue – New Underwood	
Pennington	East Central Pennington	84.24	135.57	84	167th Avenue	
Pennington	East Central Pennington	88.23	141.99	88	171st Avenue	Eastbound exit and westbound entrance
Pennington	East Central Pennington	90.25	145.24	90	173rd Avenue – Wicksville	
Pennington	Wasta	98.14	157.94	98	Base Line Road – Wasta	Partial cloverleaf interchange
Pennington	Wasta Township	101.23	162.91	101	Jensen Road	Partial cloverleaf interchange
Pennington	Lake Flat Township	107.85	173.57	107	Cedar Butte Road	
Pennington	Wall	109.82	176.74	109	I-90 BL east / W. 4th Avenue – Wall	
Pennington	Wall	110.98	178.60	110	I-90 BL west (Glenn Street) / SD 240 east (Badlands Loop) – Wall, Badlands	
Pennington	Fairview Township	112.01	180.26	112	US 14 east – Philip, Pierre	Eastern end of US 14 concurrency, trumpet interchange
Pennington	Fairview Township	116.94	188.20	116	239th Street	
Pennington	Quinn Township	121.98	196.31	121	Big Foot Road	
Jackson	Northwest Jackson	127.75	205.59	127	No name exit	206th Avenue
Jackson	Northwest Jackson	131.26	211.24	131	SD 240 west (Badlands Loop) – Interior, Badlands	
Jackson	Northeast Jackson	143.29	230.60	143	SD 73 north – Philip	Western end of SD 73 concurrency
Jackson	Kadoka	150.20	241.72	150	I-90 BL east / SD 73 south – Kadoka	Eastern end of SD 73 concurrency
Jackson	Kadoka	152.42	245.30	152	I-90 BL west (South Creek Road) – Kadoka	
Jackson	Belvidere	163.03	262.37	163	SD 63 south – Belvidere	Western end of SD 63 concurrency
Jackson	Northeast Jackson	170.31	274.09	170	SD 63 north – Midland	Eastern end of SD 63 concurrency
Jackson	Northeast Jackson	172.50	277.61	172	No name exit	Stamford Road
Jones	Okaton	177.48	285.63	177	No name exit	Bork Road to SD 248
Jones	Okaton	183.48	295.28	183	Okaton	
Jones	Murdo	191.14	307.61	191	I-90 BL east – Murdo	
Jones	Murdo	192.64	310.02	192	I-90 BL west / US 83 south – Murdo, White River	Western end of US 83 concurrency
Jones	Draper	201.13	323.69	201	Draper	
Jones	Mussman Township	208.11	334.92	208	No name exit	286th Avenue / County road S10
Lyman	Vivian Township	212.80	342.47	212	US 83 north / SD 53 – Pierre, Fort Pierre	Eastern end of US 83 concurrency
Lyman	Vivian	214.25	344.80	214	Vivian	
Lyman	Northwest Lyman–South Lyman line	220.31	354.55	220	No name exit	300th Avenue
Lyman	Presho	225.38	362.71	225	I-90 BL east – Presho	
Lyman	Presho	226.39	364.34	226	I-90 BL west / US 183 south – Presho, Winner	
Lyman	Kennebec	235.42	378.87	235	SD 273 north – Kennebec	
Lyman	Lyman	241.90	389.30	241	No name exit	321st Avenue
Lyman	Reliance	248.77	400.36	248	To SD 47 north – Reliance	Actual SD 47 route runs parallel to the north along I-90 between exits 248 and 251 and does not connect to this interchange
Lyman	East Lyman	251.08	404.07	251	SD 47 south – Gregory, Winner	Actual SD 47 route intersects I-90 at this interchange
Lyman	Oacoma	260.47	419.19	260	I-90 BL east (Dougan Avenue) – Oacoma, Chamberlain	
Missouri River		262.22	422.00	Lewis and Clark Memorial Bridge over Lake Francis Case		
Brule	Chamberlain	263.53	424.11	263	South Main Street – Chamberlain	Partial cloverleaf interchange
Brule	Chamberlain	265.85	427.84	265	I-90 BL west / SD 50 west – Chamberlain	Western end of SD 50 concurrency
Brule	Pukwana	272.63	438.76	272	SD 50 east – Pukwana	Eastern end of SD 50 concurrency
Brule	Kimball	284.05	457.13	284	SD 45 north (South Main Street) – Kimball	Western end of SD 45 concurrency
Brule	Plainfield Township	289.22	465.45	289	SD 45 south – Platte	Eastern end of SD 45 concurrency
Aurora	White Lake	296.68	477.46	296	White Lake	
Aurora	Plankinton	308.25	496.08	308	Plankinton	
Aurora	Plankinton–Hopper township line	310.48	499.67	310	US 281 – Stickney, Aberdeen, Huron	
Davison	Mount Vernon	319.43	514.07	319	Mount Vernon	
Davison	Beluah Township	325.42	523.71	325	Betts Road	
Davison	Mitchell	330.41	531.74	330	I-90 BL east / SD 37 north (South Ohlman Street) – Mitchell, Huron	Western end of SD 37 concurrency
Davison	Mitchell	332.17	534.58	332	I-90 BL west / SD 37 south (South Burr Street north) – Mitchell, Parkston	Eastern end of SD 37 concurrency
Hanson	Hanson Township	335.42	539.81	335	Riverside Road	
Hanson	Alexandria	344.01	553.63	344	SD 262 east – Fulton, Alexandria	
Hanson	Pleasant Township	350.05	563.35	350	SD 25 – Emery, Farmer	
McCook	Jefferson Township	353.98	569.68	353	Spencer, Emery	
McCook	Jefferson Township	357.99	576.13	357	Bridgewater, Canova	
McCook	Salem	364.01	585.82	364	US 81 – Salem, Yankton, Madison	
McCook	Canistota Township	368.05	592.32	368	Canistota	
McCook	Greenland Township	374.02	601.93	374	Montrose	
Minnehaha	Humboldt	379.63	610.96	379	SD 19 – Humboldt, Madison	
Minnehaha	Hartford	387.46	623.56	387	South Western Avenue – Hartford	
Minnehaha	Hartford	390.21	627.98	390	SD 38 – Hartford, Buffalo Ridge	Partial cloverleaf interchange
Minnehaha	Sioux Falls	395.46	636.43	395	Marion Road	Partial cloverleaf interchange
Minnehaha	Sioux Falls	396.52	638.14	396	I-29 – Fargo, Sioux City	Signed as exits 396A (southbound) and 396B (northbound); cloverleaf interchange; I-29 exits 84A-B
Minnehaha	Sioux Falls	399.54	643.00	399	SD 115 north (Cliff Avenue) – Airport	Former I-90 Business Spur; SPUI
Minnehaha	Sioux Falls	400.58	644.67	400	I-229 south	Half-clover interchange, I-229 exits 10A–B northbound; no access to or from CR 125 (476th Street)
Minnehaha	Mapleton–Brandon township line	402.55	647.84	402	CR 121 north / Veterans Parkway – US Geological Survey/EROS	Future northern terminus of SD 100; SPUI
Minnehaha	Brandon	406.54	654.26	406	SD 11 (Splitrock Boulevard) – Corson, Brandon	Rebuilt into a diverging diamond interchange (DDI)
Minnehaha	Valley Springs	410.57	660.75	410	Valley Springs, Garretson	
Minnehaha	Red Rock Township	412.76	664.27		I-90 east – Albert Lea	Continuation into Minnesota
1.000 mi = 1.609 km; 1.000 km = 0.621 mi: Closed/former; Concurrency terminus; Incomplete access

Interstate 90
Previous state: Wyoming	South Dakota	Next state: Minnesota
