= Cedar Canyon, South Dakota =

Unincorporated community in South Dakota, United States

Coordinates: 45°01′25″N 102°41′26″W

Cedar Canyon is an unincorporated community in Meade County, in the U.S. state of South Dakota.

== History ==
Cedar Canyon was laid out in 1909, and named for a local valley where cedar trees are abundant. A post office called Cedar Canyon was established in 1914, and remained in operation until 1949.
