= Bend, South Dakota =

Unincorporated community in South Dakota, United States

Coordinates: 44°13′40″N 103°00′37″W

Bend is an unincorporated community in Meade County, in the U.S. state of South Dakota.

== History ==
A post office called Bend was established in 1886, and remained in operation until 1941. Bend was named for its location where the Elk Creek meanders.
