= Boneita Springs, South Dakota =

Unincorporated community in South Dakota, United States

Coordinates: 44°26′42″N 102°33′45″W

Boneita Springs is an unincorporated community in Meade County, in the U.S. state of South Dakota.

== History ==
Boneita Springs was laid out in 1908, and named from the Spanish diminutive meaning "beautiful" springs. A post office called Boneita Springs was in operation from 1908 until 1944. The name
