= Maurine, South Dakota =

Unincorporated community in South Dakota, United States

Coordinates: 45°01′23″N 102°35′37″W

Maurine is an unincorporated community in Meade County, in the U.S. state of South Dakota.

== History ==
Maurine's post office was established in 1926, and remained in operation until 1960. The community has the name of Maurine Price, the daughter of a pioneer merchant.
