= Enning, South Dakota =

Unincorporated community in South Dakota, United States

Enning
- Unincorporated community
- Location within the state of South Dakota Enning (the United States)
- Coordinates: 44°34′32″N 102°33′46″W
- Country: United States
- State: South Dakota
- County: Meade
- Time zone: UTC-7 (Mountain (MST))
  - Summer (DST): UTC-6 (MDT)
- ZIP codes: 57737
- Area code: 605

Enning is an unincorporated community in Meade County, South Dakota, United States. The community sits at an elevation of 3,035 feet (925 m) and was named in honor of Anna Enning's land grant for a school. Although not tracked by the Census Bureau, Enning has been assigned the ZIP code of 57737.

The first settlement at Enning was made in 1910.
