= South Dakota Highway 34 =

State highway in South Dakota, United States

Highway 34

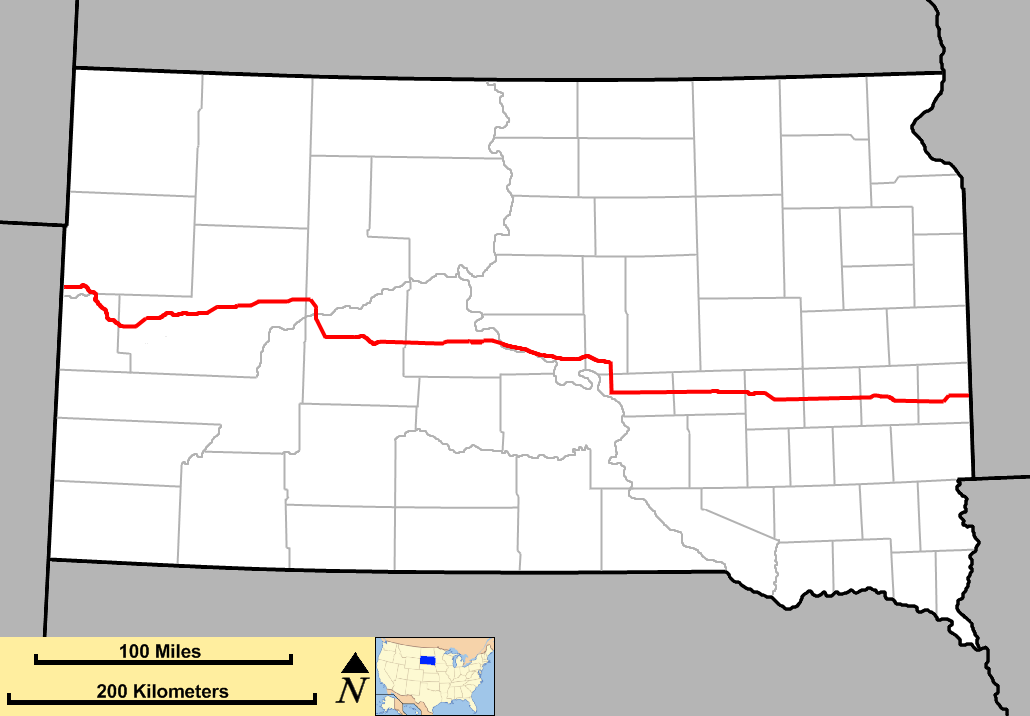
- Route of SD 34 (in red)

Route information
- Maintained by SDDOT
- Length: 419.010 mi (674.331 km)
- Existed: 1926–present
- Tourist routes: Lewis and Clark Trail; Native American Scenic Byway

Major junctions
- West end: WYO 24 at the Wyoming state line near Belle Fourche
- US 85 at Belle Fourche; I-90 / US 14 at Sturgis; US 83 / US 14 at Pierre; US 281 east of Wessington Springs; US 81 at Madison; I-29 south-east of Madison
- East end: MN 30 at the Minnesota state line near Flandreau

Location
- Country: United States
- State: South Dakota
- Counties: Butte, Lawrence, Meade, Ziebach, Haakon, Stanley, Hughes, Hyde, Buffalo, Jerauld, Sanborn, Miner, Lake, Moody

Highway system
- South Dakota State Trunk Highway System; Interstate; US; State
← SD 32	→ SD 35

South Dakota Highway 34 (SD 34) is a state route that runs parallel to Interstate 90 across the entire state of South Dakota. It begins at the Wyoming border west of Belle Fourche, as a continuation of Wyoming Highway 24 (WYO 24). The eastern terminus is at the Minnesota border east of Egan, or southwest of Airlie, Minnesota, where it continues as Minnesota State Highway 30 (MN 30). It is just over 419 miles (674 km) in length, making it the longest state highway in South Dakota.

== History ==
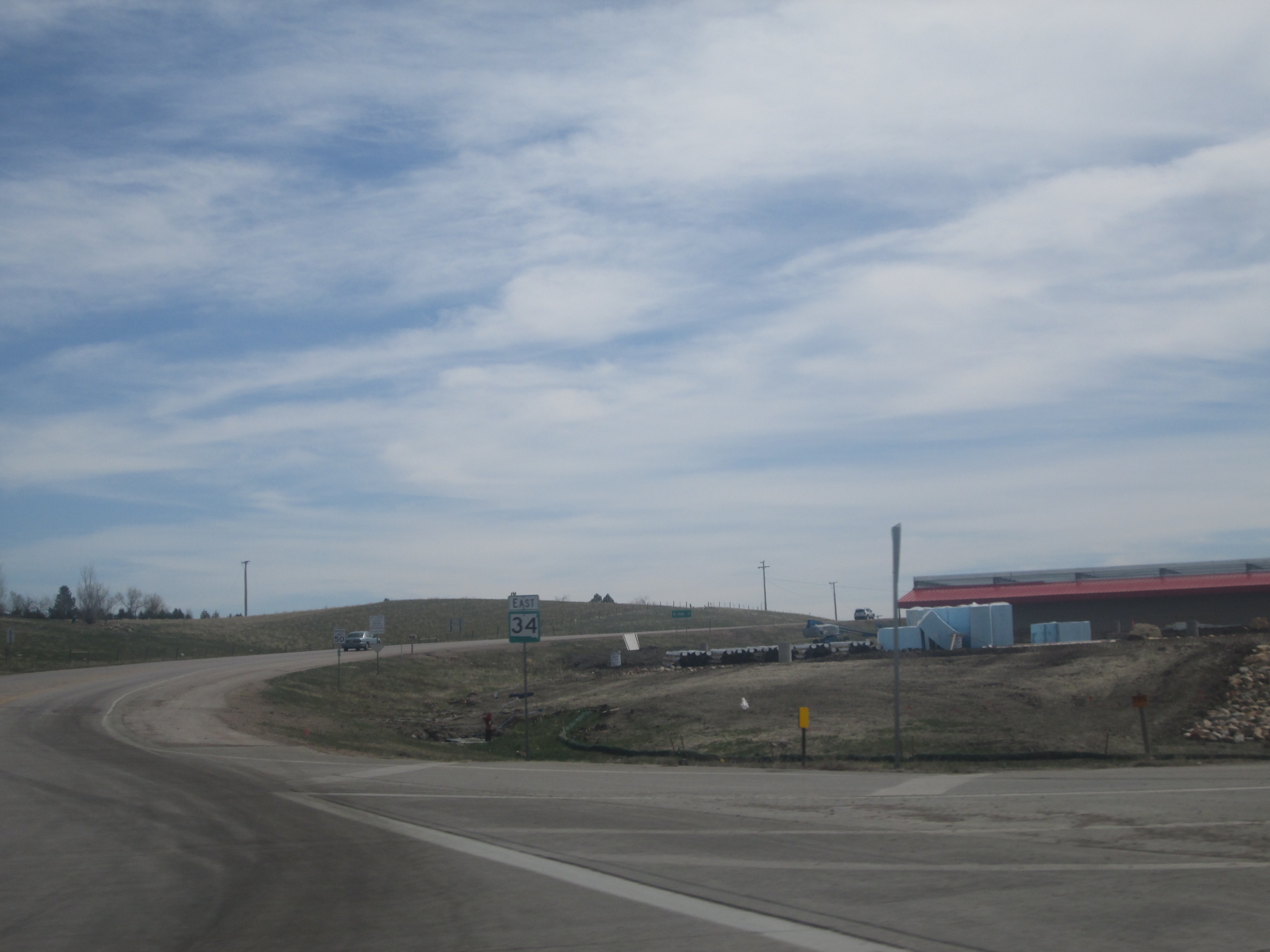
SD 34 in Belle Fourche

When first implemented in 1926, the western terminus was at South Dakota Highway 45 near Gann Valley. In the 1940s and early 1950s, a road was gradually built from Pierre to SD 45 via Fort Thompson, and SD 34 was extended west along it upon its completion. A further extension westward occurred in February 1961, when SD 34 absorbed the alignment of South Dakota Highway 24.

In the late 1960s, a portion of SD 34 (along with U.S. Highway 14) was upgraded as part of the construction of Interstate 90. The segment between Whitewood and Sturgis (exits 23 and 30) remains signed with I-90 and U.S. 14.

A 10-mile (16 km) segment of SD 34 in Sanborn County has been upgraded to 4 lanes. This is part of a 4-lane route from Huron to Mitchell via South Dakota Highway 37.

== Major intersections ==
County	Location	mi	km	Destinations	Notes
Butte	West Butte	0.000	0.000	WYO 24 west – Hulett	Continuation into Wyoming
Butte	Belle Fourche	9.919	15.963	US 85 – Spearfish, Belle Fourche	
Lawrence	North Lawrence	27.267– 27.371	43.882– 44.049	I-90 west / US 14 west – Spearfish	Western end of I-90/US 14 concurrency
Meade	Sturgis	33.873– 34.294	54.513– 55.191	I-90 east / US 14 east / US 14A west / SD 79 south – Rapid City, Deadwood, Lead	Eastern end of I-90/US 14 concurrency, eastern terminus of US 14A, western end of SD 79 concurrency
Meade	Southwest Meade	39.319	63.278	SD 79 north – Bear Butte State Park, Newell	Eastern end of SD 79 concurrency
Meade	Howes	113.051	181.938	SD 73 north – US 212, Faith	Western end of SD 73 concurrency
Ziebach	No major junctions				
Haakon	East Haakon	138.931	223.588	SD 73 south – Phillip	Eastern end of SD 73 concurrency
Stanley	North Stanley–South Stanley line	167.189	269.065	SD 63 north / Lewis and Clark Trail / Native American Scenic Byway – Eagle Butte	Western end of SD 63 concurrency
Stanley	North Stanley–South Stanley line	167.673	269.844	US 14 west / SD 63 south – Phillip	Western end of US 14 concurrency, eastern end of SD 63 concurrency
Stanley	Fort Pierre	204.473	329.067	SD 1806 north – Oahe Dam	Western end of SD 1806 concurrency
Stanley	Fort Pierre	205.362	330.498	US 83 south / SD 1806 south / Lewis and Clark Trail / Native American Scenic Byway	Western end of US 83 concurrency, eastern end of SD 1806 concurrency
Hughes	Pierre	206.804	332.819	US 14 east / US 83 north / Lewis and Clark Trail / US 14 Truck begins / US 83 Truck begins	US 14 Truck & US 83 Truck begins, eastern end of US 14/US 83 concurrency
Hughes	Pierre	208.796	336.025	US 14 Truck east / US 83 Truck north	Eastern end of US 14 Truck & US 83 Truck concurrency
Hyde	Crow Creek	254.528	409.623	SD 47 north – Highmore	Northern end of SD 47 concurrency
Buffalo	Fort Thompson	266.869	429.484	SD 47 south / Lewis and Clark Trail / Native American Scenic Byway – Fort Thompson, Big Bend Dam	Southern end of SD 47 concurrency
Buffalo	Fort Thompson	267.812	431.002	SD 249 south – Big Bend Dam	Northern terminus of SD 249
Buffalo	Crow Creek	272.369	438.335	SD 50 east / Lewis and Clark Trail / Native American Scenic Byway – Chamberlain	Western terminus of SD 50
Buffalo	Elvira Township	289.300	465.583	SD 45 – Gann Valley, Miller	
Jerauld	Wessington Springs Township	316.095	508.706	US 281 to I-90 / US 14	
Sanborn	Woonsocket–Silver Creek township line	328.326	528.389	SD 37 north – Huron	Western end of SD 37 concurrency
Sanborn	Union Township	338.415	544.626	SD 37 south – Mitchell	Eastern end of SD 37 concurrency
Miner	Roswell Township	356.352	573.493	SD 25 south – Epiphany	Western end of SD 25 concurrency
Miner	Howard Township	362.381	583.196	SD 25 north – DeSmet	Eastern end of SD 25 concurrency
Miner	Clearwater Township	370.445	596.173	US 81 south – Salem	Western end of US 81 concurrency
Lake	Madison	383.519	617.214	US 81 north – Arlington	Eastern end of US 81 concurrency
Lake	Lake View Township	387.529	623.667	SD 19 south – Humboldt	Northern terminus of SD 19
Moody	Egan Township	402.961– 403.153	648.503– 648.812	I-29 – Sioux Falls, Brookings	
Moody	Lone Rock Township	419.010	674.331	MN 30 east – Pipestone	Continuation into Minnesota
1.000 mi = 1.609 km; 1.000 km = 0.621 mi: Concurrency terminus

== See also ==
- List of state highways in South Dakota
