= Bethel Lutheran Church =

Historic church in South Dakota, United States

- U.S. National Register of Historic Places
- Location within South Dakota Location within the United States
- Location: Main and Fifth Sts., Faith, South Dakota
- Coordinates: 45°1′10″N 102°2′19″W
- Area: less than one acre
- Built: 1925
- Built by: Central Lumber Co.
- Architectural style: Gothic
- MPS: Rural Butte and Meade Counties MRA
- NRHP reference No.: 86000941
- Added to NRHP: April 30, 1986

Bethel Lutheran Church is a historic church located at Main and Fifth Streets in Faith, South Dakota. The church was built in 1925 by a Norwegian Lutheran congregation that formed in Faith in 1917. While Norwegians were one of the largest immigrant groups in western South Dakota, the church is one of the few remaining Norwegian-American sites in Meade County. The church has a vernacular Gothic design typical of Norwegian Lutheran churches. A bell tower with an octagonal spire rises above the front entrance; the tower has Gothic arched openings on all four sides of the bell. The rest of the church is relatively plain and lacking in Gothic details; its significant features include stained glass windows and a Gothic nave plan.

The church was added to the National Register in 1986.
