= Marcus, South Dakota =

Unincorporated community in South Dakota, United States

Coordinates: 44°39′29″N 102°16′24″W

Marcus is an unincorporated community in Meade County, in the U.S. state of South Dakota.

== History ==
A post office called Marcus was established in 1909. Marcus Connelly, an early postmaster, gave the community his name.
