= Fairpoint, South Dakota =

Unincorporated community in South Dakota, United States

Coordinates: 44°44′54″N 102°47′48″W

Fairpoint is an unincorporated community in Meade County, in the U.S. state of South Dakota.

== History ==
A post office called Fairpoint was established in 1909, and remained in operation until 1966. The name Fairpoint was selected because at the time, there was only one place in the United States with the name. The town had a population of 150 in 1940.
