= Tilford, South Dakota =

Unincorporated community in South Dakota, United States

Tilford
- Unincorporated community
- Location within the state of South Dakota Tilford (the United States)
- Coordinates: 44°18′01″N 103°25′48″W
- Country: United States
- State: South Dakota
- County: Meade
- Elevation: 3,589 ft (1,094 m)
- Time zone: UTC-7 (Mountain (MST))
  - Summer (DST): UTC-6 (MDT)
- ZIP codes: 57769
- Area code: 605
- FIPS code: 46-63580
- GNIS feature ID: 1262587

Tilford is an unincorporated community located in Meade County, South Dakota, United States. Tilford is located at Exit 40 off I-90, approximately 9.2 miles (14.8 km) south of Sturgis, the county seat. Although Tilford is unincorporated, it has its own ZIP code of 57769.

== History ==
Tilford was platted in 1888. It was named for Colonel Joseph G. Tilford, commander of Fort Meade. A post office was established at Tilford in 1888, and remained in operation until it was discontinued in 1958.
