= Hereford, South Dakota =

Unincorporated community in South Dakota, United States

Coordinates: 44°23′14″N 102°53′44″W

Hereford is an unincorporated community in Meade County, in the U.S. state of South Dakota.

There is a small rural public school located at 15998 Cross S Road, called Hereford Elementary. It offers education from Kindergarten to 8th grades.

== History ==
A post office called Hereford was established in 1894, and remained in operation until 1985. The community was so named for the Hereford cattle which grazed on the prairie.
