= Bear Butte =

Mountain in South Dakota, U.S.

- U.S. National Register of Historic Places
- U.S. National Historic Landmark
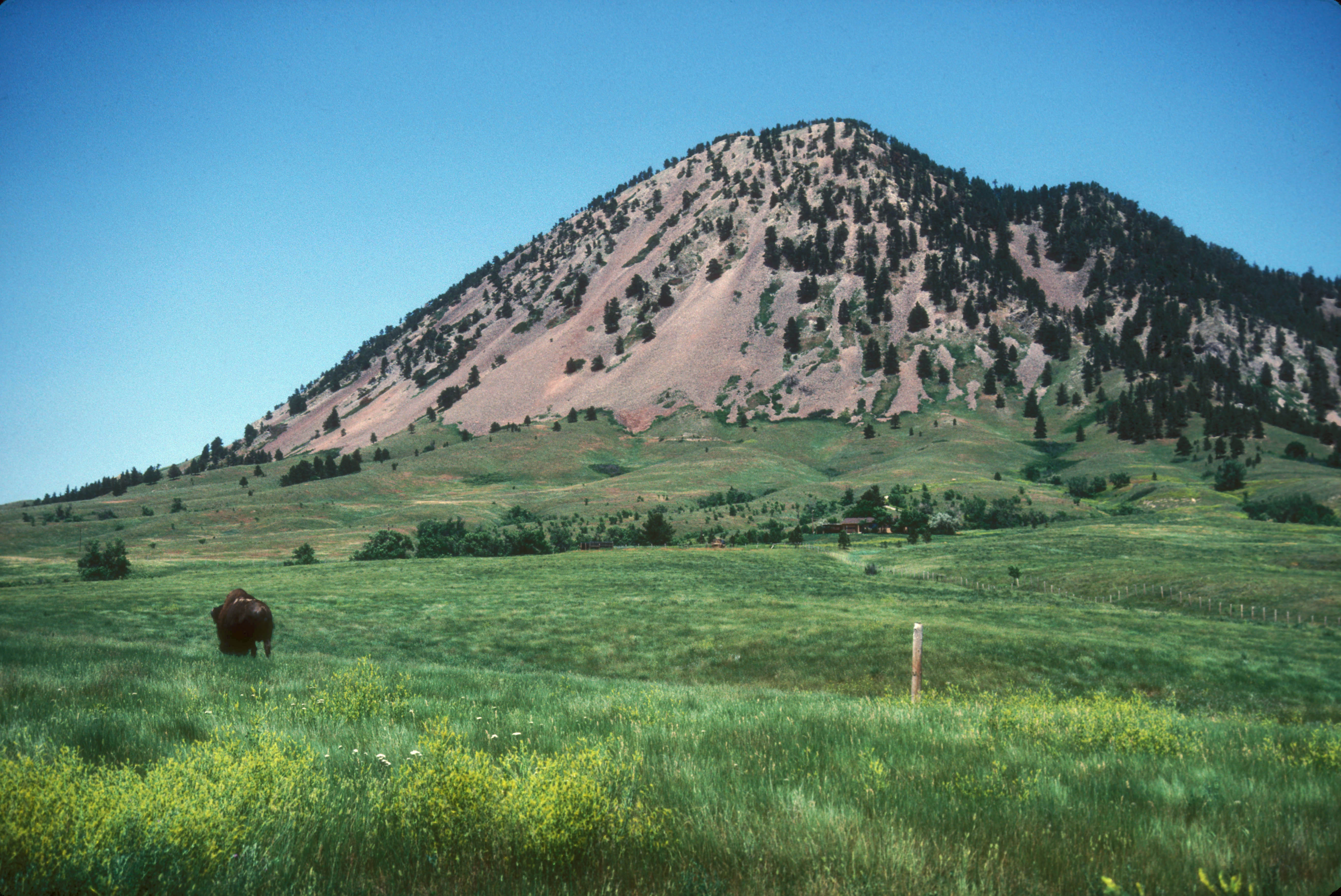

- Location within South Dakota
- Location: Meade County, South Dakota
- Nearest city: Sturgis, South Dakota
- Coordinates: 44°28′33″N 103°25′37″W
- Website: Official website
- NRHP reference No.: 73001746

Significant dates
- Added to NRHP: June 19, 1973
- Designated NHL: December 21, 1981

Bear Butte is a geological laccolith feature located near Sturgis, South Dakota, United States, that was established as a State Park in 1961. An important landmark and religious site for the Plains Indians tribes long before Europeans reached South Dakota, Bear Butte is called Matȟó Pahá, or Bear Mountain, by the Lakota, or Sioux. To the Cheyenne, it is known as Noahȧ-vose ('Giving Hill') or Náhkȯhe-vose ('Bear Hill'), and is the place where Ma'heo'o (Great Spirit) imparted to Sweet Medicine, a Cheyenne prophet, the knowledge from which the Cheyenne derive their religious, political, social, and economic customs.

The mountain is sacred to many indigenous peoples, who make pilgrimages to leave prayer cloths and tobacco bundles tied to the branches of the trees along the mountain's flanks. Other offerings are often left at the top of the mountain. The site is associated with various religious ceremonies throughout the year. The mountain is a place of prayer, meditation, and peace.

The park includes a campsite west of South Dakota Highway 79 where horseback riding, fishing, and boating are permitted. On the summit side of Highway 79, a moderately sized herd of bison roams the base of the mountain. An education center and a summit trail are available. Official park policy advises visitors to Bear Butte to respect worshipers and to leave religious offerings undisturbed. Park fees are waived for those undertaking religious activities. Some nearby land was also obtained by some Native American tribes in later years as well.

The summit of the butte is the northern terminus of the South Dakota Centennial Trail.

== Geological history ==
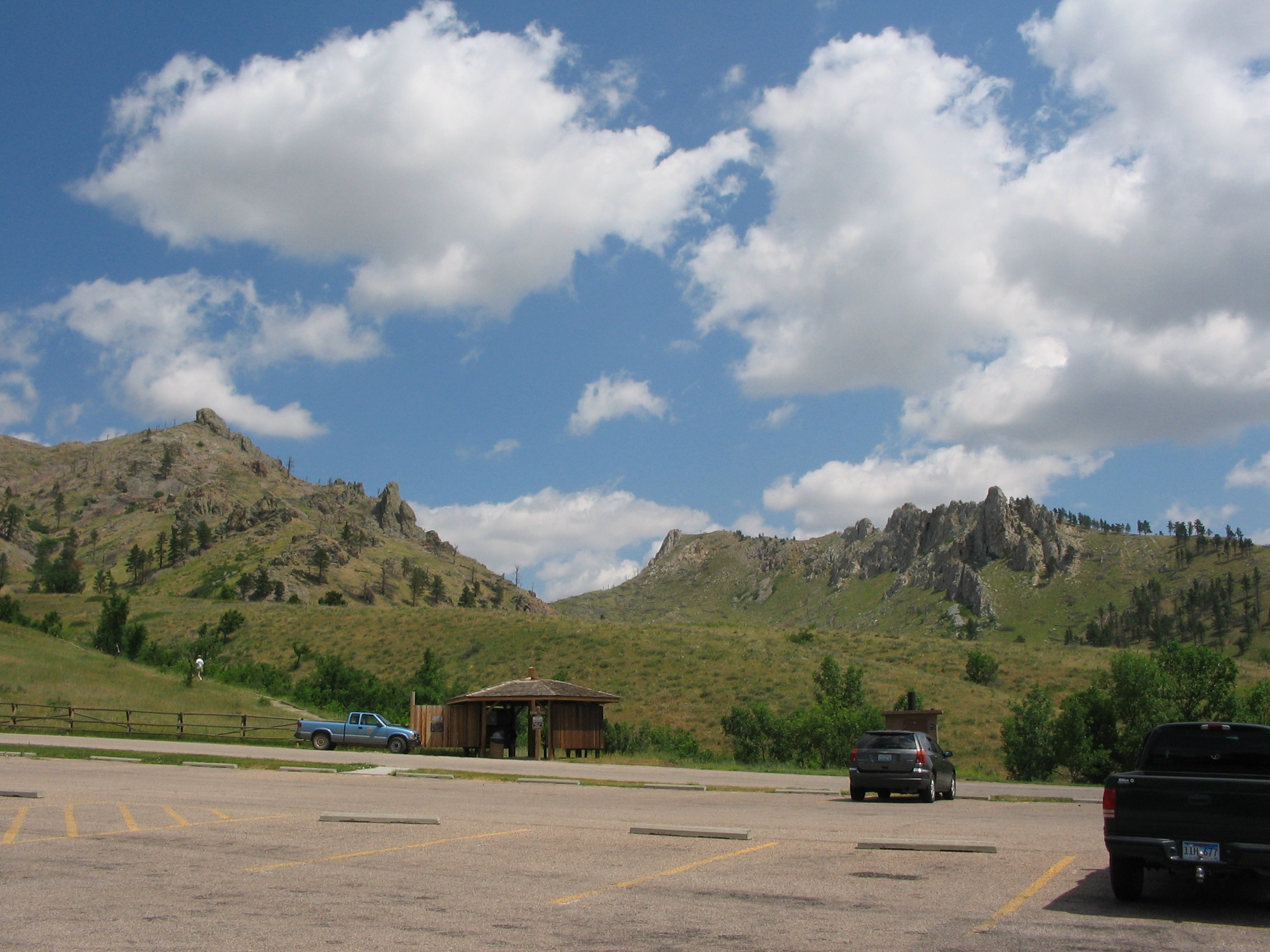
The summit trail head

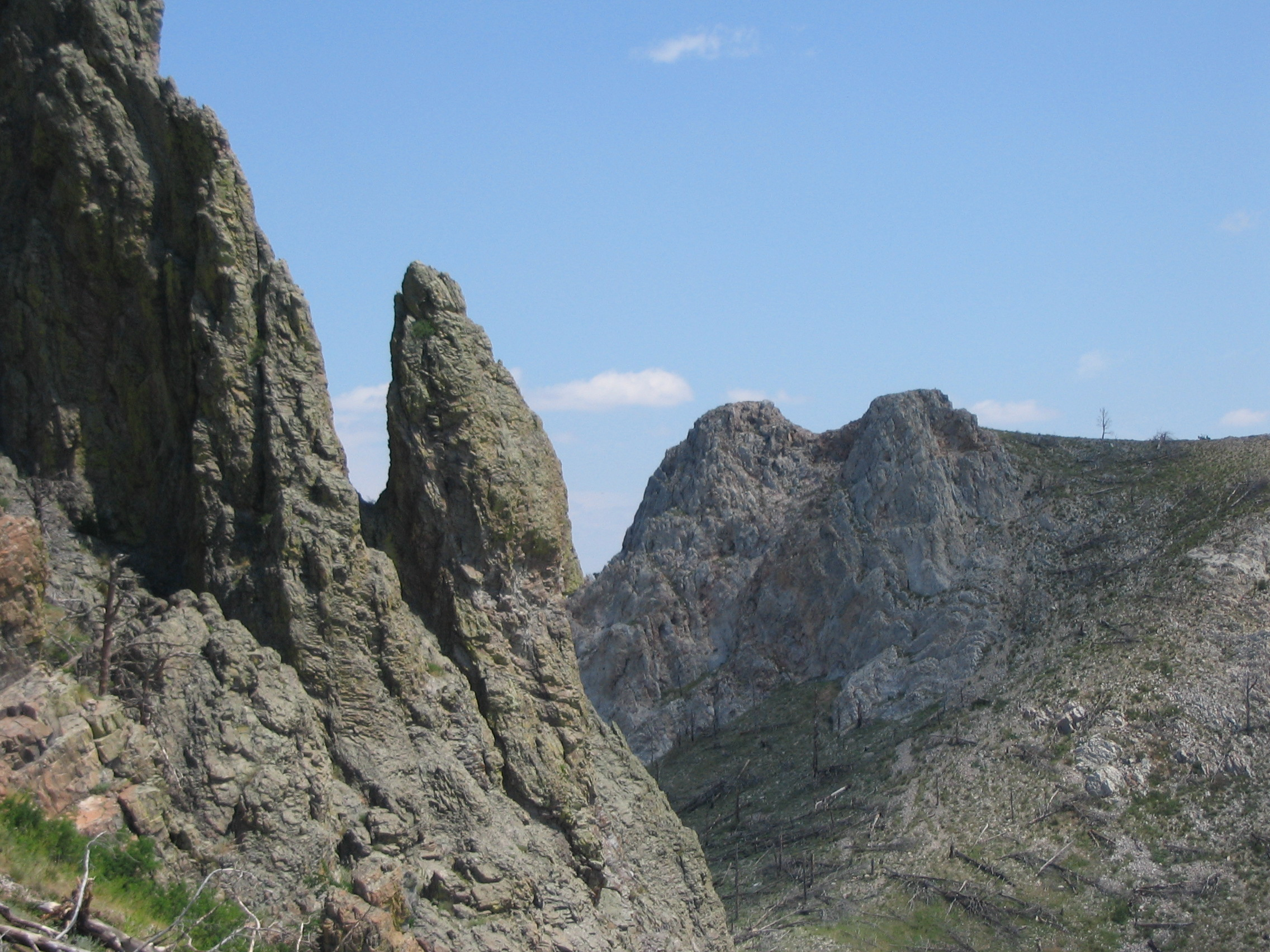
The eastern half of the butte

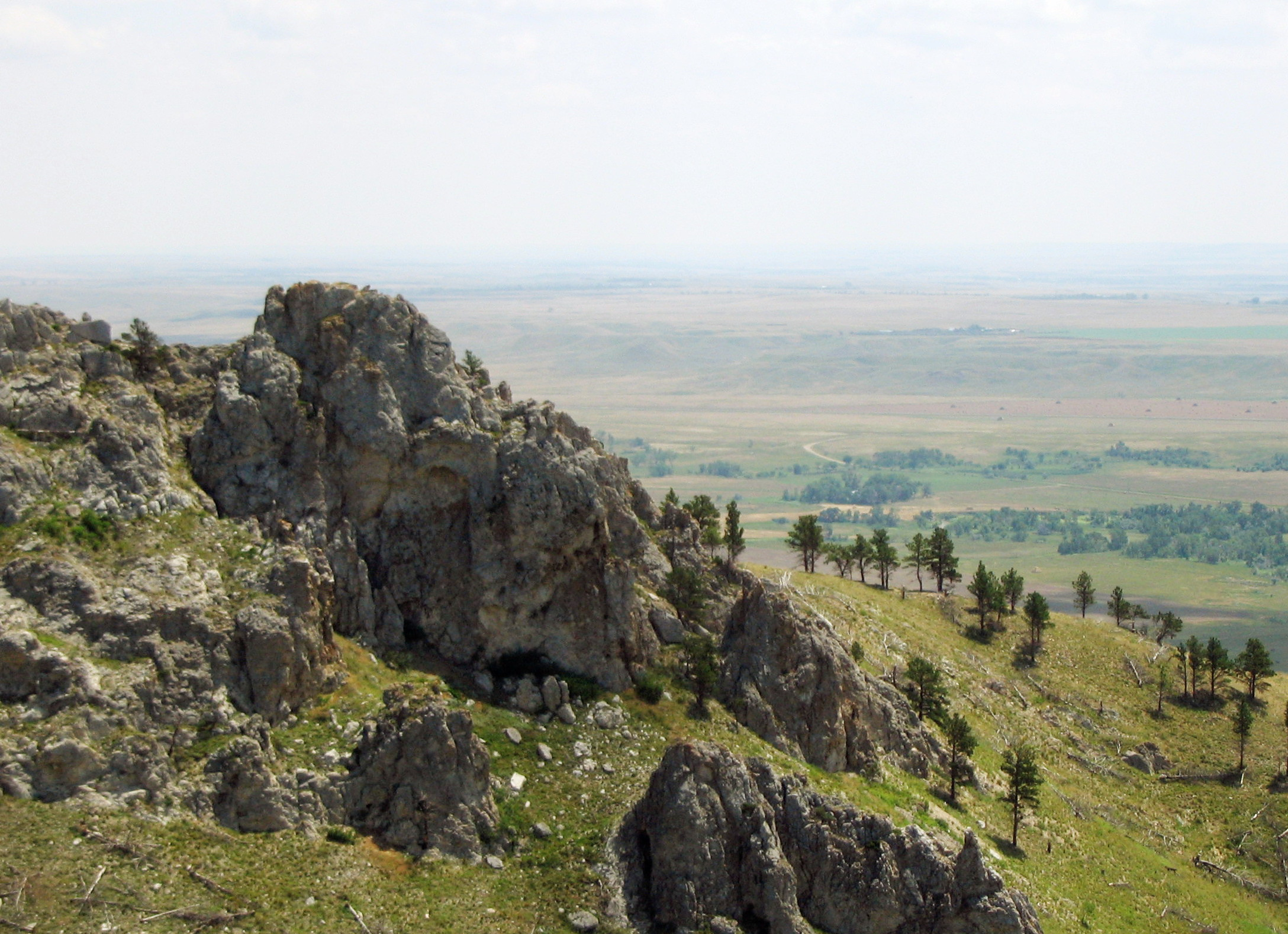
View from saddle

Bear Butte is not strictly a butte (created primarily by erosion of sedimentary strata), but a laccolith: an intrusive body of igneous rock, uplifting the earlier sedimentary layers, which have since largely eroded away. This is the result of the forcible entry (or intrusion) of magma into cooler crustal rock in the Black Hills area during the Eocene Epoch. In this, Bear Butte shares a similar geological history with other formations in the region, including the Black Hills, Devils Tower, the Missouri Buttes, and some parts of the Rocky Mountains. It is possible that when the intrusion was emplaced, some magma may have breached the surface, forming a volcano; however, it would have eroded away long ago.

The peak rises 1,253.5 feet (382.1 m) above the surrounding plain and measures 4,426 feet (1,349 m) above sea level.

== Modern history ==
Human artifacts have been found on or near Bear Butte that date back 10,000 years, indicating a long and continuous interest in the mountain. The Cheyenne and Lakota people have maintained a spiritual interest in Bear Butte from their earliest recorded history.

Notable visitors like Red Cloud, Crazy Horse, and Sitting Bull made pilgrimages to the site. In 1857, a council of many Indian nations gathered at Bear Butte to discuss the growing presence of white settlers in the Black Hills.

Violating a treaty of 1868, George Armstrong Custer led an expedition to the Black Hills region in 1874, and according to custom he camped near Bear Butte. Custer verified the rumors of gold in the Black Hills, and Bear Butte then served as an easily identifiable landmark for the rush of invading prospectors and settlers into the region. Indian reaction to the illegal movements of whites into the area was intense and hostile. Ultimately the government reneged on its treaty obligations regarding the Black Hills and instead embarked on a program to confine all northern Plains tribes to reservations.

Ezra Bovee homesteaded on the southern slopes of the mountain, and by the time of World War II, he and his family were the legal owners of the site. In the spring of 1945, the Northern Cheyenne received permission from Bovee to hold a ceremony at Bear Butte to pray for the end of World War II. The Cheyenne found that the Bovee family welcomed their interest in the mountain, and over the years the Bovees continued to encourage native religious ceremonies.

By the mid-1950s Ezra Bovee was attempting to stir up interest in making Bear Butte a national park. After his death, his family continued the effort. When federal interest in the project waned, the state government in Pierre took action, and Bear Butte became a state park in 1961 and was registered as a National Historic Landmark in 1981.

Frank Fools Crow, the Lakota ceremonial chief (d. 1989), made pilgrimages to Bear Butte throughout his lifetime. Fools Crow taught racial harmony not just between whites and Indians, but among all the peoples of the world. He believed the Lakota should never sell the Black Hills. A bust and plaque in front of the education center at Bear Butte State Park honor Fools Crow's efforts.

Frank Fools Crow was the plaintiff in one of the most prominent attempts by Native Americans to gain access to sacred lands under the American Indian Religious Freedom Act of 1978. The case, Fools Crow v. Gullett, related to the introduction in 1982 of limits on when and for how long Lakota and Cheyenne religious ceremonies could take place on the Bluff. The Indian Americans argued that both the American Indian Religious Freedom Act and the First Amendment protected their right to unlimited access to the Bluff. They also wanted the Bluff to remain untouched as it was sacred. The plaintiffs lost their case on both the District and Appellate level and were denied a hearing by the Supreme Court.

In 2011, the National Trust for Historic Preservation included Bear Butte on its list of the 11 Most Endangered Places. Between 2016 and 2018, Native American tribes such as the Southern Cheyenne and Arapaho Tribe of Oklahoma, the Northern Cheyenne Tribe of Montana and the Rosebud Sioux Tribe of South Dakota acquired land around the butte due to the cultural significance.

== See also ==
- List of National Historic Landmarks in South Dakota
- National Register of Historic Places listings in Meade County, South Dakota
- List of South Dakota state parks
