= Union Center, South Dakota =

Unincorporated community in South Dakota, United States

Union Center
- Census-designated place & unincorporated community
- Location within the state of South Dakota Union Center (the United States)
- Coordinates: 44°33′48″N 102°39′52″W
- Country: United States
- State: South Dakota
- County: Meade
- Founded: 1927
- Named for: Farmers' Union
- Elevation: 2,913 ft (888 m)
- Time zone: UTC-7 (Mountain (MST))
  - Summer (DST): UTC-6 (MDT)
- ZIP codes: 57787
- Area code: 605
- FIPS code: 46-65540
- GNIS feature ID: 2628851; 1258697

Union Center is a small rural village in Meade County, South Dakota, United States. It is an unincorporated community, which was designated as part of the U.S. Census Bureau's Participant Statistical Areas Program on June 10, 2010. It was not counted separately during the 2000 Census, but is scheduled for inclusion in the 2010 Census. It has the post office which serves the area covered by ZIP code 57787, and three small businesses.

Union Center was founded in 1927 by the Farmers' Union as one of their first enterprises in South Dakota.
