= Summerset, South Dakota =

Summerset
- City
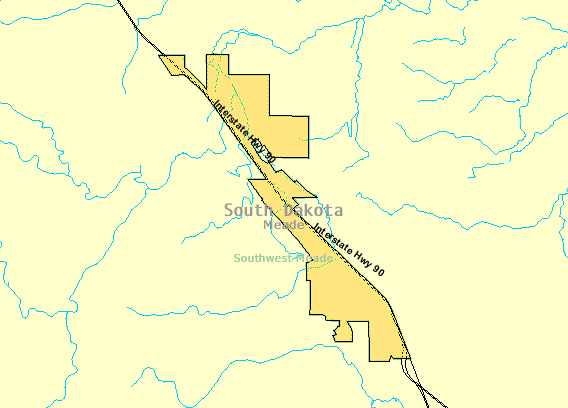
- U.S. Census Bureau boundary map of Summerset as of 2008
- Coordinates: 44°11′28″N 103°20′22″W
- Country: United States
- State: South Dakota
- County: Meade
- Incorporated: June 7, 2005

Government
  - Mayor: Michael Kitzmiller

Area
  - City: 2.72 sq mi (7.05 km^{2})
  - Land: 2.72 sq mi (7.05 km^{2})
  - Water: 0 sq mi (0.00 km^{2})
- Elevation: 3,632 ft (1,107 m)

Population (2020)
  - City: 2,972
  - Estimate (2022): 3,053
  - Density: 1,091.3/sq mi (421.37/km^{2})
  - Urban: 5,325
  - Metro: 153,911
- Time zone: UTC–7 (Mountain (MST))
  - Summer (DST): UTC–6 (CDT)
- ZIP code: 57718 and 57769
- Area code: 605
- FIPS code: 46-62155
- GNIS feature ID: 2396001
- Website: summerset.us

Summerset is a city in Meade County, South Dakota, United States. The population was 2,972 at the 2020 census. Located in the western part of the state, it is the first city to incorporate in the state since 1985.

Summerset was incorporated in an election that was held on June 7, 2005. Opponents of the city's dissolution insist a population of more than one thousand, despite the formal pre-incorporation census indicating 597 residents. The city is located west of Interstate 90, between the towns of Blackhawk and Piedmont. The city shares its zip codes of 57718 and 57769 with these two towns.

During its first year, Summerset faced a few challenges. There was confusion about the location of the city's boundaries. A lawsuit was filed to dismiss the incorporation election; moreover, the citizens petitioned to have the town dissolved for a multitude of reasons, including high taxes; the petition failed.

This issue went to trial on September 14, 2006 in Meade County. A decision was handed down by the jury in the trial on September 15, 2006, siding with Summerset that there were indeed more than 1000 inhabitants at the time of the vote to incorporate. The plaintiff, Casey Dolney of Summerset, can appeal the decision to the South Dakota Supreme Court.

== Geography ==
According to the United States Census Bureau, the city has a total area of 2.21 square miles (5.72 km^{2}), all land.

Summerset is part of the Rapid City, South Dakota metropolitan area, which includes Meade and Pennington counties.

== Demographics ==
Historical population
Census	Pop.	Note	%±
2000	335		—
2010	1,814		441.5%
2020	2,972		63.8%
2022 (est.)	3,053		2.7%
U.S. Decennial Census; 2020 Census

=== 2020 census ===
As of the 2020 census, Summerset had a population of 2,972. The median age was 34.0 years; 31.3% of residents were under the age of 18 and 11.2% of residents were 65 years of age or older. For every 100 females there were 100.4 males, and for every 100 females age 18 and over there were 96.9 males age 18 and over.

There were 1,068 households in Summerset, of which 44.1% had children under the age of 18 living in them. Of all households, 63.8% were married-couple households, 12.7% were households with a male householder and no spouse or partner present, and 16.4% were households with a female householder and no spouse or partner present. About 17.0% of all households were made up of individuals and 6.1% had someone living alone who was 65 years of age or older.

There were 1,094 housing units, of which 2.4% were vacant. The homeowner vacancy rate was 0.6% and the rental vacancy rate was 4.9%.

98.9% of residents lived in urban areas, while 1.1% lived in rural areas.

Racial composition as of the 2020 census
Race	Number	Percent
White	2,611	87.9%
Black or African American	15	0.5%
American Indian and Alaska Native	89	3.0%
Asian	24	0.8%
Native Hawaiian and Other Pacific Islander	1	0.0%
Some other race	14	0.5%
Two or more races	218	7.3%
Hispanic or Latino (of any race)	103	3.5%

=== 2010 census ===
As of the census of 2010, there were 1,814 people, 655 households, and 508 families residing in the city. The population density was 820.8 inhabitants per square mile (316.9/km^{2}). There were 707 housing units at an average density of 319.9 per square mile (123.5/km^{2}). The racial makeup of the city was 93.0% White, 1.0% African American, 2.5% Native American, 0.4% Asian, 0.2% Pacific Islander, 0.8% from other races, and 2.1% from two or more races. Hispanic or Latino of any race were 2.4% of the population.

There were 655 households, of which 46.1% had children under the age of 18 living with them, 65.8% were married couples living together, 7.8% had a female householder with no husband present, 4.0% had a male householder with no wife present, and 22.4% were non-families. 15.9% of all households were made up of individuals, and 2.4% had someone living alone who was 65 years of age or older. The average household size was 2.77 and the average family size was 3.11.

The median age in the city was 31.6 years. 31.1% of residents were under the age of 18; 5.9% were between the ages of 18 and 24; 37.7% were from 25 to 44; 18.8% were from 45 to 64; and 6.4% were 65 years of age or older. The gender makeup of the city was 50.5% male and 49.5% female.

== Cityscape ==
Summerset is a prime example of urban sprawl. Many subdivisions and master-planned communities are found in or near Summerset. It is contiguous to other urbanized areas, is served by Interstate 90 which runs through the middle of the city, and a state highway which runs parallel to the interstate highway.

== Education ==
Most of Summerset is in Meade School District 46-1, while a portion is in Rapid City School District 51-4.
