= Sturgis Motorcycle Museum & Hall of Fame =

Museum in South Dakota, United States

Coordinates: 44.41448°N 103.50881°W

Sturgis Motorcycle Museum & Hall of Fame is a non-profit organization dedicated to preserving the history of motorcycling while honoring the heritage of the Sturgis Motorcycle Rally in Sturgis, South Dakota. The museum's doors officially opened in June 2001. The museum's first location was an old church renovated with extensive help from community groups including the museum's Board of Directors, the Jackpine Gypsies Motorcycle Club, local students and other volunteers from the Sturgis community.

Vintage and rare motorcycles were loaned to the museum for the opening by national and local collectors. After a year of successful operation, the City of Sturgis provided the museum with a new facility at Main Street and Junction Avenue. The historical building had served as the community's post office for over 60 years.

The Motorcycle Museum offers informative and comprehensive exhibits, showcasing nearly 100 unique and historic motorcycles that date back to 1907. The museum's Hall of Fame recognizes individuals or groups who have made a long term positive contribution to the motorcycle community. The Hall of Fame honors individuals who have contributed to the sport and the lifestyle.
