= Stoneville, South Dakota =

Unincorporated community in Meade County, South Dakota, United States

Coordinates: 44°44′01″N 102°39′17″W

Stoneville is an unincorporated community in Meade County, South Dakota, United States.

== History ==
A post office called Stoneville was established in 1903, and remained in operation until 1965. Some say the community was so named on account of stone construction typical of the houses, while others believe the community has the name of L. N. Stone, a first settler.
