= Opal, South Dakota =

Unincorporated community in South Dakota, United States

Coordinates: 44°53′30″N 102°27′02″W

Opal is an unincorporated community in Meade County, in the U.S. state of South Dakota.

== History ==
Opal was laid out in 1907. A post office was established at Opal in 1909.
