= Howes, South Dakota =

Unincorporated community in South Dakota, United States

Howes
- Unincorporated community
- Location within the state of South Dakota Howes (the United States)
- Coordinates: 44°37′10″N 102°3′5″W
- Country: United States
- State: South Dakota
- County: Meade
- Time zone: UTC-7 (Mountain (MST))
  - Summer (DST): UTC-6 (MDT)
- ZIP codes: 57748
- Area code: 605

Howes is an unincorporated community in Meade County, South Dakota, United States. Although not tracked by the Census Bureau, Howes has been assigned the ZIP code of 57748.
