= Meade County, South Dakota =

County in South Dakota, United States

- County
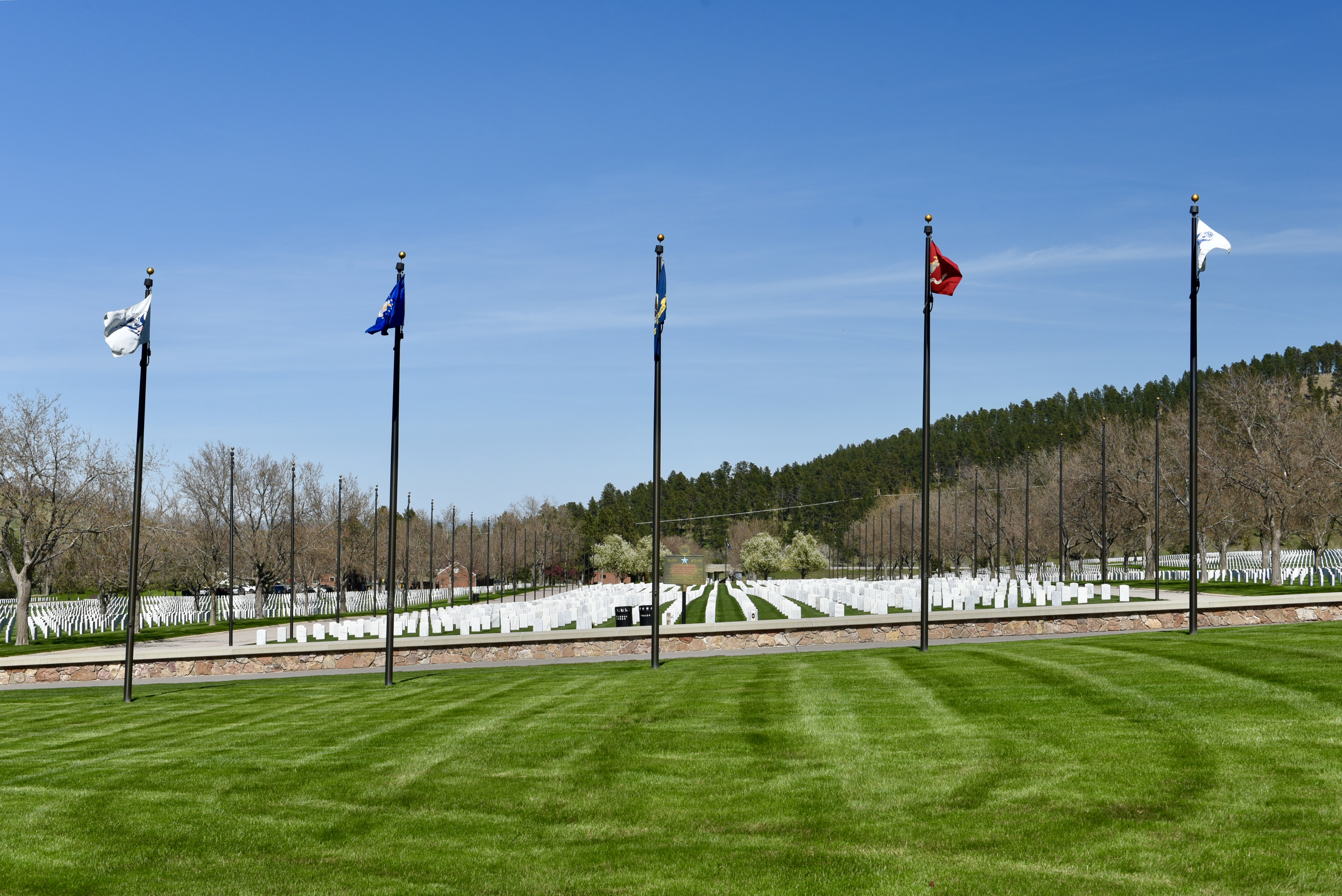
- Black Hills National Cemetery

- Location within the U.S. state of South Dakota
- Coordinates: 44°34′N 102°43′W
- Country: United States
- State: South Dakota
- Founded: February 7, 1889
- Named for: George Meade
- Seat: Sturgis
- Largest city: Sturgis

Area
  - Total: 3,483 sq mi (9,020 km^{2})
  - Land: 3,471 sq mi (8,990 km^{2})
  - Water: 12 sq mi (31 km^{2}) 0.3%

Population (2020)
  - Total: 29,852
  - Estimate (2025): 30,711 ▲
  - Density: 8.600/sq mi (3.321/km^{2})
- Time zone: UTC−7 (Mountain)
  - Summer (DST): UTC−6 (MDT)
- Congressional district: At-large
- Website: www.meadecounty.org

Meade County is a county in the U.S. state of South Dakota. As of the 2020 census, the population was 29,852, making it the 6th most populous county in South Dakota. Its county seat is Sturgis. The county was created in 1889 and named for Fort Meade, which was garrisoned as a United States military post in the area in 1878 and itself named for General George Meade.

Meade County is part of the Rapid City metropolitan area.

== Geography ==
The upper part of Meade County is drained by Cherry Creek. The Cheyenne River flows northeastward along the southeast boundary of the county. The county terrain has mountain ridges in the west and southwest areas, with the remainder consisting of semi-arid rolling hills, partly dedicated to agriculture. The county terrain slopes to the east and northeast; its highest point Flagstaff Mountain is near the southwest corner, at 5,421 ft (1,652 m) ASL.

The county has an area of 3,483 square miles (9,020 km^{2}), of which 3,471 square miles (8,990 km^{2}) is land and 12 square miles (31 km^{2}) (0.3%) is water. It is South Dakota's largest county by area.

=== Major highways ===
- Interstate 90
- U.S. Highway 14
- U.S. Highway 14A
- U.S. Highway 212
- South Dakota Highway 34
- South Dakota Highway 73
- South Dakota Highway 79

=== Adjacent counties ===
- Perkins County – north
- Ziebach County – east
- Haakon County – southeast
- Pennington County – south
- Lawrence County – southwest
- Butte County – northwest

=== Protected areas ===
- Bear Butte Lake State Lakeside Use Area
- Bear Butte National Wildlife Refuge
- Bear Butte State Park
- Black Hills National Cemetery
- Black Hills National Forest (partial)
- Curlew Lake State Game Production Area
- Marcotte State Game Production Area
- Tisdale Lake State Game Production Area
- Opal Lake State Game Production Area

=== Lakes ===
- Bear Butte Lake
- Curlew Lake
- Durkee Lake
- Opal Lake
- Tisdale Dam

== Demographics ==
Historical population
Census	Pop.	Note	%±
1890	4,640		—
1900	4,907		5.8%
1910	12,640		157.6%
1920	9,367		−25.9%
1930	11,482		22.6%
1940	9,735		−15.2%
1950	11,516		18.3%
1960	12,044		4.6%
1970	16,618		38.0%
1980	20,717		24.7%
1990	21,878		5.6%
2000	24,253		10.9%
2010	25,434		4.9%
2020	29,852		17.4%
2025 (est.)	30,711	▲	2.9%
U.S. Decennial Census; 1790–1960 1900–1990; 1990–2000 2010–2020

=== 2020 census ===
As of the 2020 census, there were 29,852 people, 11,365 households, and 7,863 families residing in the county.

The population density was 8.6 inhabitants per square mile (3.3/km^{2}). There were 12,357 housing units, of which 8.0% were vacant; 71.8% of occupied housing units were owner-occupied and 28.2% were renter-occupied. The homeowner vacancy rate was 1.0% and the rental vacancy rate was 6.4%.

Of the residents, 25.1% were under the age of 18 and 16.2% were 65 years of age or older; the median age was 36.7 years. For every 100 females there were 106.7 males, and for every 100 females age 18 and over there were 105.9 males.

The racial makeup of the county was 86.2% White, 1.5% Black or African American, 3.0% American Indian and Alaska Native, 0.9% Asian, 1.0% from some other race, and 7.2% from two or more races. Hispanic or Latino residents of any race comprised 4.4% of the population.

Of those 11,365 households, 32.8% had children under the age of 18 living with them and 19.3% had a female householder with no spouse or partner present. About 24.7% of all households were made up of individuals and 10.4% had someone living alone who was 65 years of age or older.

=== 2010 census ===
As of the 2010 census, there were 25,434 people, 9,903 households, and 7,067 families in the county. The population density was 7.3 inhabitants per square mile (2.8/km^{2}). There were 11,000 housing units at an average density of 3.2 per square mile (1.2/km^{2}). The racial makeup of the county was 92.0% white, 2.3% American Indian, 1.3% black or African American, 0.6% Asian, 0.1% Pacific islander, 0.8% from other races, and 2.9% from two or more races. Those of Hispanic or Latino origin made up 3.0% of the population. In terms of ancestry, 40.5% were German, 15.3% were Irish, 13.2% were Norwegian, 11.3% were English, and 6.9% were American.

Of the 9,903 households, 33.9% had children under the age of 18 living with them, 58.2% were married couples living together, 8.8% had a female householder with no husband present, 28.6% were non-families, and 23.6% of all households were made up of individuals. The average household size was 2.49 and the average family size was 2.93. The median age was 35.9 years.

The median income for a household in the county was $46,180 and the median income for a family was $54,200. Males had a median income of $34,113 versus $27,548 for females. The per capita income for the county was $22,045. About 6.6% of families and 10.1% of the population were below the poverty line, including 12.1% of those under age 18 and 10.1% of those age 65 or over.

== Communities ==
=== Cities ===
- Box Elder (part)
- Faith
- Piedmont
- Sturgis (county seat)
- Summerset

=== Census-designated places ===
- Blackhawk
- Blucksberg Mountain
- Ellsworth AFB (former)
- Wonderland Homes

=== Unincorporated communities ===
- Bend
- Boneita Springs
- Buffalo Chip
- Cedar Canyon
- Dalzell
- Elm Springs
- Enning
- Fairpoint
- Fox Ridge
- Haydraw
- Hereford
- Howes
- Marcus
- Maurine
- Mud Butte
- Opal
- Plainview
- Redowl
- Stoneville
- Tilford
- Union Center
- Viewfield
- White Owl
- Postville

=== Townships ===
- Dakota
- Eagle
- Elm Springs
- Howard
- Lakeside
- Smithville
- Upper Red Owl

=== Unorganized territories ===
- Belle Fourche-Cheyenne Valleys
- North Meade
- Southwest Meade

== Politics ==
Like most of the Black Hills, Meade County is heavily Republican. It last supported a Democrat for president in 1964.

United States presidential election results for Meade County, South Dakota
Year	Republican		Democratic		Third party(ies)	
Year	No.	%	No.	%	No.	%
1892	427	36.56%	128	10.96%	613	52.48%
1896	550	40.56%	802	59.14%	4	0.29%
1900	550	48.89%	565	50.22%	10	0.89%
1904	754	65.79%	268	23.39%	124	10.82%
1908	953	51.24%	792	42.58%	115	6.18%
1912	0	0.00%	975	43.72%	1,255	56.28%
1916	858	38.25%	1,224	54.57%	161	7.18%
1920	1,894	58.37%	894	27.55%	457	14.08%
1924	2,006	57.43%	786	22.50%	701	20.07%
1928	2,845	66.04%	1,441	33.45%	22	0.51%
1932	1,735	37.65%	2,687	58.31%	186	4.04%
1936	2,064	44.71%	2,304	49.91%	248	5.37%
1940	2,560	57.00%	1,931	43.00%	0	0.00%
1944	1,912	62.16%	1,164	37.84%	0	0.00%
1948	2,053	54.47%	1,681	44.60%	35	0.93%
1952	3,109	69.98%	1,334	30.02%	0	0.00%
1956	2,467	59.81%	1,658	40.19%	0	0.00%
1960	2,644	57.89%	1,923	42.11%	0	0.00%
1964	2,140	47.95%	2,323	52.05%	0	0.00%
1968	2,392	56.19%	1,522	35.75%	343	8.06%
1972	3,416	67.24%	1,633	32.15%	31	0.61%
1976	3,096	54.41%	2,478	43.55%	116	2.04%
1980	5,349	70.93%	1,721	22.82%	471	6.25%
1984	5,908	73.47%	2,093	26.03%	40	0.50%
1988	5,189	61.24%	3,212	37.91%	72	0.85%
1992	4,724	46.89%	2,694	26.74%	2,657	26.37%
1996	4,984	54.32%	2,960	32.26%	1,232	13.43%
2000	6,870	73.35%	2,267	24.20%	229	2.45%
2004	8,347	72.56%	2,941	25.57%	216	1.88%
2008	7,515	64.75%	3,751	32.32%	340	2.93%
2012	7,566	69.95%	2,928	27.07%	323	2.99%
2016	8,441	72.64%	2,223	19.13%	957	8.24%
2020	9,875	72.24%	3,285	24.03%	510	3.73%
2024	10,887	74.20%	3,421	23.32%	364	2.48%

== Education ==
School districts include:

- Douglas School District 51-1
- Faith School District 46-2
- New Underwood School District 51-3
- Newell School District 09-2
- Rapid City School District 51-4
- Meade School District 46-1
- Wall School District 51-5

== See also ==
- National Register of Historic Places listings in Meade County, South Dakota
