= Elm Springs, South Dakota =

Unincorporated community in South Dakota, United States

Elm Springs
- Unincorporated community
- Location within the state of South Dakota Elm Springs (the United States)
- Coordinates: 44°18′48″N 102°31′38″W
- Country: United States
- State: South Dakota
- County: Meade
- Time zone: UTC-7 (Mountain (MST))
  - Summer (DST): UTC-6 (MDT)
- ZIP codes: 57791
- Area code: 605

Elm Springs is an unincorporated community in Meade County, South Dakota, United States. The locality was settled in 1893. Although not tracked by the Census Bureau, Elm Springs had been assigned the ZIP code of 57736. It now uses the zipcode from Wasta, which is 57791.

The community took its name from a nearby spring where elm trees grew.
