= Piedmont, South Dakota =

Piedmont
- City
- Location within the state of South Dakota
- Coordinates: 44°13′02″N 103°22′31″W
- Country: United States
- State: South Dakota
- County: Meade
- Founded: 1890
- Incorporated: 2007
- Named for: French for "foot of the mountain"

Area
  - Total: 1.56 sq mi (4.05 km^{2})
  - Land: 1.56 sq mi (4.05 km^{2})
  - Water: 0 sq mi (0.00 km^{2})
- Elevation: 3,583 ft (1,092 m)

Population (2020)
  - Total: 971
  - Density: 620.9/sq mi (239.72/km^{2})
- Time zone: UTC-6 (Mountain Time Zone (MST))
  - Summer (DST): UTC-5 (MDT)
- ZIP codes: 57769
- Area code: 605
- FIPS code: 46-49500
- GNIS feature ID: 2547299
- Website: PiedmontSD.com

Piedmont is a city in Meade County, South Dakota, United States. According to the 2020 census, its population was 971. Piedmont lies along Interstate 90 between Rapid City and Sturgis. Piedmont has been assigned the ZIP Code of 57769.

== History ==
Piedmont takes its name from a French word meaning "the foot of the mountain", because it lies on the eastern slope of the Black Hills. Piedmont was founded in 1890 and remained unincorporated for nearly 117 years. It officially became a city August 16, 2007, and elected its first town board in November 2007. The area was first inhabited in the mid-1870s.

== Geography ==
Piedmont is located in part of an area referred to as the Red Valley, or Race Track, a rock layer in the Spearfish Formation, which forms a valley circling the Black Hills. It is mostly red shale with beds of gypsum. Piedmont lies west of Interstate 90, north of Summerset, east of the Black Hills National Forest, and south of Elk Creek.

According to the United States Census Bureau, the city has a total area of 0.29 square miles (0.75 km^{2}), all land.

=== Climate ===
Climate data for Piedmont, South Dakota
Month	Jan	Feb	Mar	Apr	May	Jun	Jul	Aug	Sep	Oct	Nov	Dec	Year
Record high °F (°C)	73 (23)	78 (26)	81 (27)	90 (32)	99 (37)	105 (41)	107 (42)	104 (40)	103 (39)	92 (33)	83 (28)	74 (23)	107 (42)
Mean daily maximum °F (°C)	38 (3)	39 (4)	47 (8)	56 (13)	66 (19)	76 (24)	85 (29)	84 (29)	73 (23)	61 (16)	47 (8)	38 (3)	59 (15)
Mean daily minimum °F (°C)	13 (−11)	14 (−10)	22 (−6)	31 (−1)	42 (6)	51 (11)	58 (14)	56 (13)	45 (7)	34 (1)	23 (−5)	14 (−10)	34 (1)
Record low °F (°C)	−25 (−32)	−28 (−33)	−19 (−28)	0 (−18)	19 (−7)	32 (0)	40 (4)	38 (3)	21 (−6)	−3 (−19)	−17 (−27)	−29 (−34)	−29 (−34)
Average precipitation inches (mm)	0.19 (4.8)	0.35 (8.9)	0.85 (22)	2.01 (51)	3.86 (98)	2.61 (66)	2.57 (65)	2.14 (54)	1.47 (37)	1.49 (38)	0.51 (13)	0.32 (8.1)	18.37 (465.8)
Source: The Weather Channel (Historical Monthly Averages)

== Demographics ==
Historical population
Census	Pop.	Note	%±
2010	222		—
2020	971		337.4%
U.S. Decennial Census; 2018 Estimate

=== 2020 census ===
As of the 2020 census, Piedmont had a population of 971. The median age was 41.1 years. 22.5% of residents were under the age of 18 and 18.6% of residents were 65 years of age or older. For every 100 females there were 106.2 males, and for every 100 females age 18 and over there were 106.3 males age 18 and over.

79.5% of residents lived in urban areas, while 20.5% lived in rural areas.

There were 384 households in Piedmont, of which 28.6% had children under the age of 18 living in them. Of all households, 55.5% were married-couple households, 18.5% were households with a male householder and no spouse or partner present, and 16.7% were households with a female householder and no spouse or partner present. About 22.1% of all households were made up of individuals and 9.1% had someone living alone who was 65 years of age or older.

There were 423 housing units, of which 9.2% were vacant. The homeowner vacancy rate was 0.0% and the rental vacancy rate was 21.6%.

Racial composition as of the 2020 census
Race	Number	Percent
White	868	89.4%
Black or African American	4	0.4%
American Indian and Alaska Native	22	2.3%
Asian	3	0.3%
Native Hawaiian and Other Pacific Islander	1	0.1%
Some other race	7	0.7%
Two or more races	66	6.8%
Hispanic or Latino (of any race)	39	4.0%

=== 2010 census ===
As of the census of 2010, 222 people, 101 households, and 64 families were residing in the city. The population density was 765.5 inhabitants per square mile (295.6/km^{2}). The 110 housing units had an average density of 379.3 per square mile (146.4/km^{2}). The racial makeup of the city was 91.4% White, 0.5% African American, 6.8% Native American, 0.5% from other races, and 0.9% from two or more races. Hispanics or Latinos of any race were 1.8% of the population.

Of the 101 households, 23.8% had children under 18 living with them, 53.5% were married couples, 5.9% had a female householder with no husband present, 4.0% had a male householder with no wife present, and 36.6% were not families. About 30.7% of all households were made up of individuals, and 12.9% had someone living alone who was 65 or older. The average household size was 2.20, and the average family size was 2.66.

The median age in the city was 43.8 years; 18.9% of residents were under the age of 18; 9.2% were between 18 and 24; 23.5% were from 25 to 44; 37% were from 45 to 64; and 11.7% were 65 or older. The gender makeup of the city was 52.3% male and 47.7% female.

== Natural disasters ==
The Piedmont area has experienced several large forest fires in recent years, including the Little Elk in 2002, Ricco Fire in 2005, and Eastridge Fire in 2006. In August 2007 Piedmont experienced a significant storm, including softball-sized hail and heavy rain, which caused significant flooding and other damage to the city.

== Economy ==
Many Piedmont area residents work in nearby Rapid City. Larger private employers include Mountain West Products, which processes bark from area sawmills into retail landscape products, High Plains Genetics, which provides genetic material to livestock producers, and Jack's Campers. Piedmont has numerous small businesses in tourism, transportation, and construction.

== Education ==
It is in Meade School District 46-1.
