= Blackhawk, South Dakota =

Black Hawk, South Dakota
- CDP
- Location in Meade County and the state of South Dakota

- Location in the United States
- Coordinates: 44°09′05″N 103°20′02″W
- Country: United States
- State: South Dakota
- County: Meade

Area
  - Total: 4.74 sq mi (12.27 km^{2})
  - Land: 4.74 sq mi (12.27 km^{2})
  - Water: 0 sq mi (0.00 km^{2})
- Elevation: 3,747 ft (1,142 m)

Population (2020)
  - Total: 3,026
  - Density: 638.7/sq mi (246.61/km^{2})
- Time zone: UTC−7 (Mountain (MST))
  - Summer (DST): UTC−6 (MDT)
- ZIP code: 57718
- Area code: 605
- FIPS code: 46-05780
- GNIS feature ID: 2393338

Black Hawk (sometimes Blackhawk) is an unincorporated census-designated place (CDP) in Meade County, South Dakota, United States. The population was 3,026 at the 2020 census. Black Hawk has been assigned the ZIP code of 57718. Located along Interstate 90, Black Hawk is part of the Rapid City metropolitan area.

== History ==
Black Hawk was platted in 1887. It took its name from a nearby creek which was named for Black Hawk, a Sauk chief. In May 2020, Black Hawk experienced a large sinkhole into an abandoned gypsum mine which displaced some twelve families.

== Geography ==
According to the United States Census Bureau, the CDP has a total area of 2.2 square miles (5.7 km^{2}), all land. Black Hawk is located north of Box Elder Creek, west of Interstate 90, south of the City of Summerset, and east of the Black Hills National Forest.

== Demographics ==
Historical population
Census	Pop.	Note	%±
1980	1,608		—
1990	1,995		24.1%
2000	2,432		21.9%
2010	2,892		18.9%
2020	3,026		4.6%
U.S. Decennial Census

=== 2020 census ===
As of the 2020 census, Blackhawk had a population of 3,026. The median age was 39.4 years. 24.3% of residents were under the age of 18 and 14.9% of residents were 65 years of age or older. For every 100 females there were 105.7 males, and for every 100 females age 18 and over there were 106.1 males age 18 and over.

88.4% of residents lived in urban areas, while 11.6% lived in rural areas.

There were 1,188 households in Blackhawk, of which 31.7% had children under the age of 18 living in them. Of all households, 56.6% were married-couple households, 18.3% were households with a male householder and no spouse or partner present, and 17.8% were households with a female householder and no spouse or partner present. About 21.6% of all households were made up of individuals and 7.8% had someone living alone who was 65 years of age or older.

There were 1,227 housing units, of which 3.2% were vacant. The homeowner vacancy rate was 0.0% and the rental vacancy rate was 2.2%.

Racial composition as of the 2020 census
Race	Number	Percent
White	2,606	86.1%
Black or African American	8	0.3%
American Indian and Alaska Native	134	4.4%
Asian	18	0.6%
Native Hawaiian and Other Pacific Islander	0	0.0%
Some other race	22	0.7%
Two or more races	238	7.9%
Hispanic or Latino (of any race)	125	4.1%

=== 2000 census ===
At the 2000 census there were 2,432 people in 847 households, including 665 families, in the CDP. The population density was 1,119.8 inhabitants per square mile (432.4/km^{2}). There were 871 housing units at an average density of 401.1 per square mile (154.9/km^{2}). The racial makeup of the CDP was 94.86% White, 0.29% African American, 2.75% Native American, 0.21% Asian, 0.04% Pacific Islander, 0.04% from other races, and 1.81% from two or more races. Hispanic or Latino of any race were 1.60%.

Of the 847 households 46.9% had children under the age of 18 living with them, 61.3% were married couples living together, 12.8% had a female householder with no husband present, and 21.4% were non-families. 15.3% of households were one person and 3.3% were one person aged 65 or older. The average household size was 2.87 and the average family size was 3.17.

The age distribution was 32.4% under the age of 18, 8.0% from 18 to 24, 34.5% from 25 to 44, 19.8% from 45 to 64, and 5.3% 65 or older. The median age was 32 years. For every 100 females, there were 97.7 males. For every 100 females age 18 and over, there were 94.6 males.

The median household income was $44,414 and the median family income was $47,154. Males had a median income of $34,135 versus $24,444 for females. The per capita income for the CDP was $17,364. About 10.1% of families and 12.2% of the population were below the poverty line, including 22.0% of those under age 18 and 4.5% of those age 65 or over.

== Schools ==
It is within the Rapid City School District 51-4.

Black Hawk is home to one elementary school, the current building was built in 1984 to house the expanding population. Black Hawk Elementary is included in the Rapid City School District.
