= Sturgis, South Dakota =

City in South Dakota, United States

Sturgis
- City
- Sturgis, South Dakota
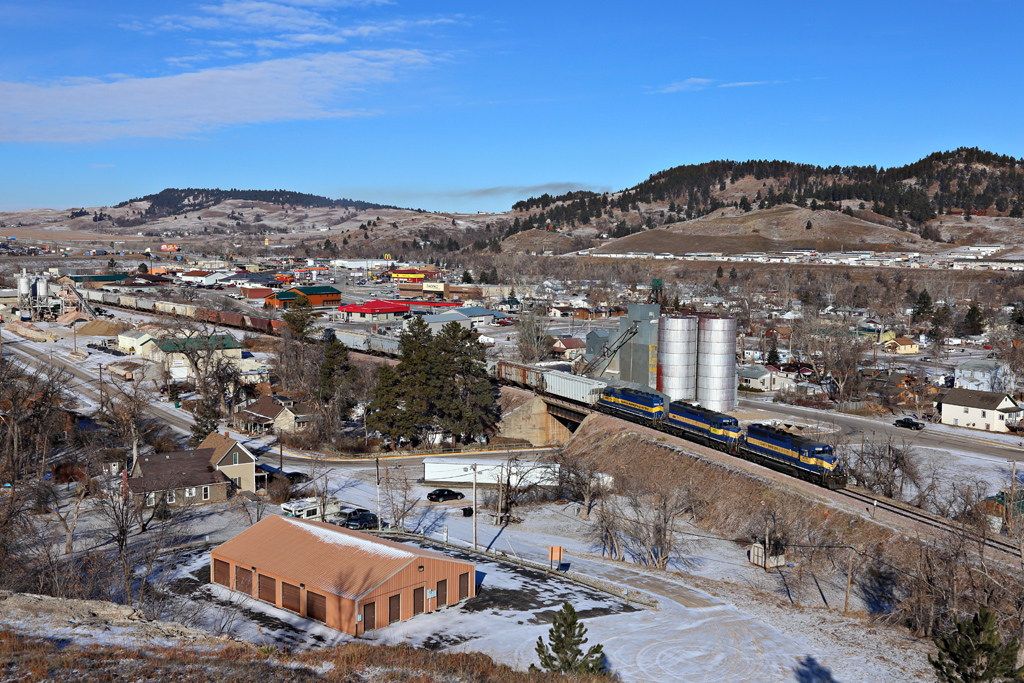
- View over Sturgis in early 2014

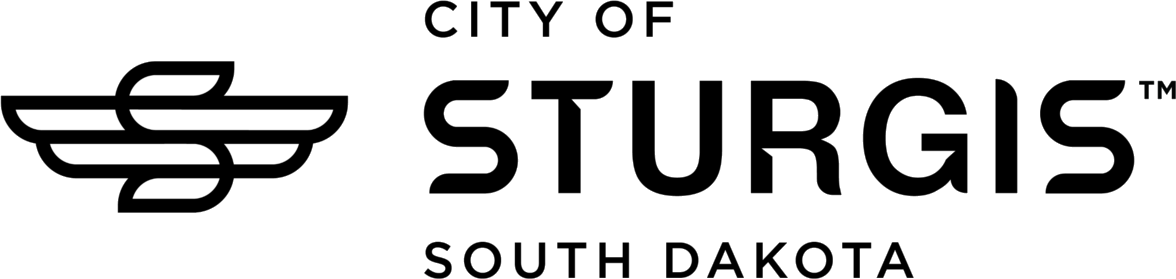
- Logo

- Location in Meade County and the state of South Dakota

- Location in the United States
- Coordinates: 44°24′41″N 103°30′01″W
- Country: United States
- State: South Dakota
- County: Meade
- Founded: 1878
- Incorporated: 1888
- Named for: Samuel D. Sturgis

Government
  - Mayor: Rod Bradley

Area
  - Total: 6.51 sq mi (16.86 km^{2})
  - Land: 6.42 sq mi (16.63 km^{2})
  - Water: 0.093 sq mi (0.24 km^{2})
- Elevation: 3,458 ft (1,054 m)

Population (2020)
  - Total: 7,020
  - Density: 1,093.4/sq mi (422.17/km^{2})
- Time zone: UTC−7 (Mountain (MST))
  - Summer (DST): UTC−6 (MDT)
- ZIP Code: 57785
- Area code: 605
- FIPS code: 46-62100
- GNIS feature ID: 1267596
- Website: sturgis-sd.gov

Sturgis is a city in Meade County, South Dakota, United States. The population was 7,020 as of the 2020 census. It is the county seat of Meade County and is named after Samuel D. Sturgis, a Union general during the Civil War.

Sturgis is notable as the location of one of the largest annual motorcycle events in the world: the Sturgis Motorcycle Rally, which lasts for 10 days beginning on the first Friday of August. It attracts large numbers of motorcycle enthusiasts from around the world. Sturgis is also noted for hosting WCW's Hog Wild/Road Wild events from 1996 to 1999.

== History ==
Sturgis was founded in 1878. An early nickname for the town was "Scooptown." Scooptown had been an earlier settlement at the base of Bear Butte, that supplied the soldiers at Camp Sturgis an outlet for their vices. When it became apparent that Sturgis was going to be the city that supplied the newly formed Fort Meade, the occupants of Scooptown moved en masse to Sturgis and set up their shops. Sturgis was named in honor of the Civil War Union General Samuel D. Sturgis. In 1889, Sturgis was designated as the county seat of the newly formed Meade County.

As part of the vast Ellsworth Air Force Base complex, the land north of Sturgis was dotted with 50 Minuteman missile silos. Minuteman missile silo L-5 is located 3.5 miles (5.6 km) from the center of the town.

Towards the end of the summer of 2015, the Full Throttle Saloon, described as the world's largest biker bar and the subject of the reality television series Full Throttle Saloon, burned down, but was rebuilt on 600 acres in nearby Vale near Bear Butte.

== Geography ==
According to the United States Census Bureau, the city has a total area of 3.99 square miles (10.33 km^{2}), all land.

=== Climate ===
Sturgis has a hot-summer humid continental climate (Dfa.) The hardiness zone is 5a.

Climate data for Sturgis, South Dakota (Fort Meade) 1991–2020 normals, extremes 1902–present
Month	Jan	Feb	Mar	Apr	May	Jun	Jul	Aug	Sep	Oct	Nov	Dec	Year
Record high °F (°C)	72 (22)	75 (24)	85 (29)	92 (33)	100 (38)	106 (41)	109 (43)	107 (42)	104 (40)	93 (34)	83 (28)	74 (23)	109 (43)
Mean maximum °F (°C)	62.0 (16.7)	62.9 (17.2)	72.2 (22.3)	79.4 (26.3)	85.4 (29.7)	93.1 (33.9)	98.0 (36.7)	97.5 (36.4)	94.0 (34.4)	83.7 (28.7)	69.7 (20.9)	61.5 (16.4)	100.3 (37.9)
Mean daily maximum °F (°C)	37.7 (3.2)	39.2 (4.0)	48.7 (9.3)	57.8 (14.3)	67.0 (19.4)	78.2 (25.7)	86.4 (30.2)	85.6 (29.8)	77.0 (25.0)	60.7 (15.9)	47.8 (8.8)	39.1 (3.9)	60.4 (15.8)
Daily mean °F (°C)	26.4 (−3.1)	27.8 (−2.3)	36.6 (2.6)	45.6 (7.6)	55.3 (12.9)	65.7 (18.7)	73.2 (22.9)	71.8 (22.1)	62.8 (17.1)	48.5 (9.2)	36.4 (2.4)	28.2 (−2.1)	48.2 (9.0)
Mean daily minimum °F (°C)	15.1 (−9.4)	16.5 (−8.6)	24.6 (−4.1)	33.5 (0.8)	43.7 (6.5)	53.2 (11.8)	59.9 (15.5)	57.9 (14.4)	48.6 (9.2)	36.4 (2.4)	25.0 (−3.9)	17.2 (−8.2)	36.0 (2.2)
Mean minimum °F (°C)	−9.1 (−22.8)	−5.7 (−20.9)	2.5 (−16.4)	16.1 (−8.8)	29.3 (−1.5)	41.6 (5.3)	48.8 (9.3)	46.5 (8.1)	33.4 (0.8)	17.5 (−8.1)	4.2 (−15.4)	−5.6 (−20.9)	−15.4 (−26.3)
Record low °F (°C)	−35 (−37)	−31 (−35)	−20 (−29)	0 (−18)	15 (−9)	27 (−3)	29 (−2)	35 (2)	20 (−7)	−5 (−21)	−20 (−29)	−30 (−34)	−35 (−37)
Average precipitation inches (mm)	0.49 (12)	0.72 (18)	1.25 (32)	2.45 (62)	4.44 (113)	3.30 (84)	2.27 (58)	1.72 (44)	1.40 (36)	1.90 (48)	0.84 (21)	0.50 (13)	21.28 (541)
Average snowfall inches (cm)	5.3 (13)	8.3 (21)	8.4 (21)	7.9 (20)	1.4 (3.6)	0.0 (0.0)	0.0 (0.0)	0.0 (0.0)	0.0 (0.0)	2.8 (7.1)	5.3 (13)	8.2 (21)	47.6 (121)
Average precipitation days (≥ 0.01 in)	6.0	6.6	7.0	9.4	12.2	11.8	9.3	7.1	6.2	7.7	5.8	5.3	94.4
Average snowy days (≥ 0.1 in)	3.3	3.6	2.1	1.5	0.3	0.0	0.0	0.0	0.0	0.9	1.7	2.9	16.3
Source: NOAA

== Demographics ==
Historical population
Census	Pop.	Note	%±
1880	60		—
1890	668		1,013.3%
1900	1,100		64.7%
1910	1,739		58.1%
1920	1,250		−28.1%
1930	1,747		39.8%
1940	3,008		72.2%
1950	3,471		15.4%
1960	4,639		33.7%
1970	4,536		−2.2%
1980	5,184		14.3%
1990	5,330		2.8%
2000	6,442		20.9%
2010	6,627		2.9%
2020	7,020		5.9%
U.S. Decennial Census; 2017 Estimate

=== 2020 census ===
As of the 2020 census, Sturgis had a population of 7,020. The median age was 42.5 years. 21.7% of residents were under the age of 18 and 23.2% of residents were 65 years of age or older. For every 100 females there were 97.9 males, and for every 100 females age 18 and over there were 92.8 males age 18 and over.

98.5% of residents lived in urban areas, while 1.5% lived in rural areas.

There were 3,092 households in Sturgis, of which 25.4% had children under the age of 18 living in them. Of all households, 39.4% were married-couple households, 21.9% were households with a male householder and no spouse or partner present, and 30.3% were households with a female householder and no spouse or partner present. About 38.2% of all households were made up of individuals and 18.7% had someone living alone who was 65 years of age or older.

There were 3,412 housing units, of which 9.4% were vacant. The homeowner vacancy rate was 1.7% and the rental vacancy rate was 6.2%.

Racial composition as of the 2020 census
Race	Number	Percent
White	6,239	88.9%
Black or African American	44	0.6%
American Indian and Alaska Native	209	3.0%
Asian	24	0.3%
Native Hawaiian and Other Pacific Islander	3	0.0%
Some other race	60	0.9%
Two or more races	441	6.3%
Hispanic or Latino (of any race)	263	3.7%

=== 2010 census ===
As of the census of 2010, there were 6,627 people, 2,916 households, and 1,687 families living in the city. The population density was 1,660.9 inhabitants per square mile (641.3/km^{2}). There were 3,154 housing units at an average density of 790.5 per square mile (305.2/km^{2}). The racial makeup of the city was 93.9% White, 0.2% African American, 2.3% Native American, 0.4% Asian, 0.6% from other races, and 2.6% from two or more races. Hispanic or Latino of any race were 2.6% of the population.

There were 2,916 households, of which 28.8% had children under the age of 18 living with them, 41.3% were married couples living together, 12.2% had a female householder with no husband present, 4.4% had a male householder with no wife present, and 42.1% were non-families. 37.0% of all households were made up of individuals, and 17.2% had someone living alone who was 65 years of age or older. The average household size was 2.21 and the average family size was 2.89.

The median age in the city was 41.2 years. 23.9% of residents were under the age of 18; 7.8% were between the ages of 18 and 24; 22.3% were from 25 to 44; 27.1% were from 45 to 64; and 18.8% were 65 years of age or older. The gender makeup of the city was 48.1% male and 51.9% female.

=== 2000 census ===
As of the census of 2000, there were 6,442 people, 2,738 households, and 1,708 families living in the city. The population density was 1,723.6 inhabitants per square mile (665.5/km^{2}). There were 2,989 housing units at an average density of 799.7 per square mile (308.8/km^{2}). The racial makeup of the city was 94.80% White, 0.20% African American, 2.48% Native American, 0.31% Asian, 0.33% from other races, and 1.88% from two or more races. Hispanic or Latino of any race were 1.75% of the population.

There were 2,738 households, out of which 30.2% had children under the age of 18 living with them, 48.0% were married couples living together, 11.5% had a female householder with no husband present, and 37.6% were non-families. 33.3% of all households were made up of individuals, and 15.6% had someone living alone who was 65 years of age or older. The average household size was 2.29 and the average family size was 2.91.

In the city, the population was spread out, with 25.0% under the age of 18, 7.9% from 18 to 24, 25.4% from 25 to 44, 22.5% from 45 to 64, and 19.3% who were 65 years of age or older. The median age was 40 years. For every 100 females, there were 91.0 males. For every 100 females age 18 and over, there were 86.1 males.

As of 2000 the median income for a household in the city was $30,253, and the median income for a family was $38,698. Males had a median income of $25,856 versus $18,582 for females. The per capita income for the city was $16,763. About 11.0% of families and 12.0% of the population were below the poverty line, including 12.7% of those under age 18 and 6.8% of those age 65 or over.

== Arts and culture ==
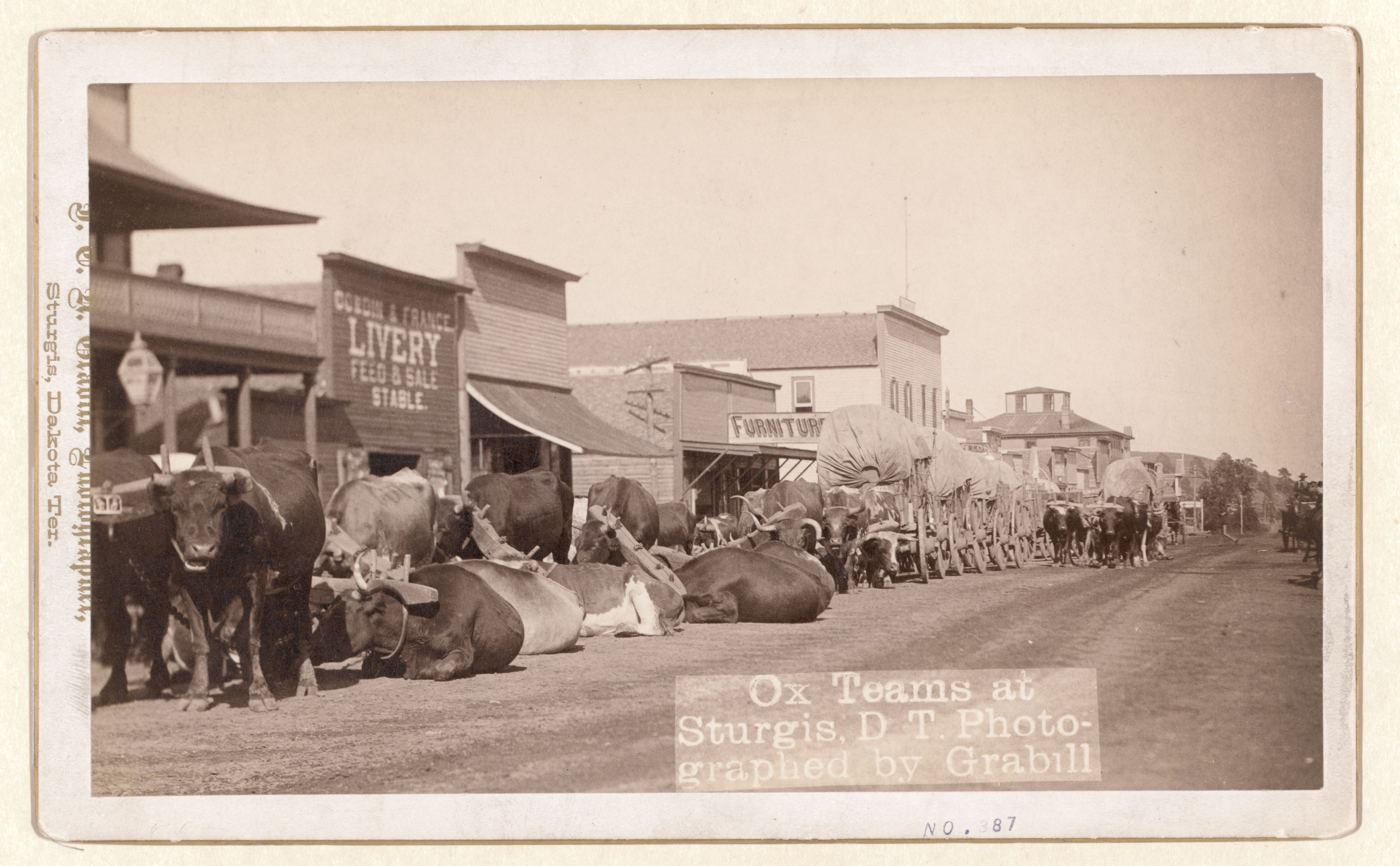
Ox teams in Sturgis, circa 1887 to 1892

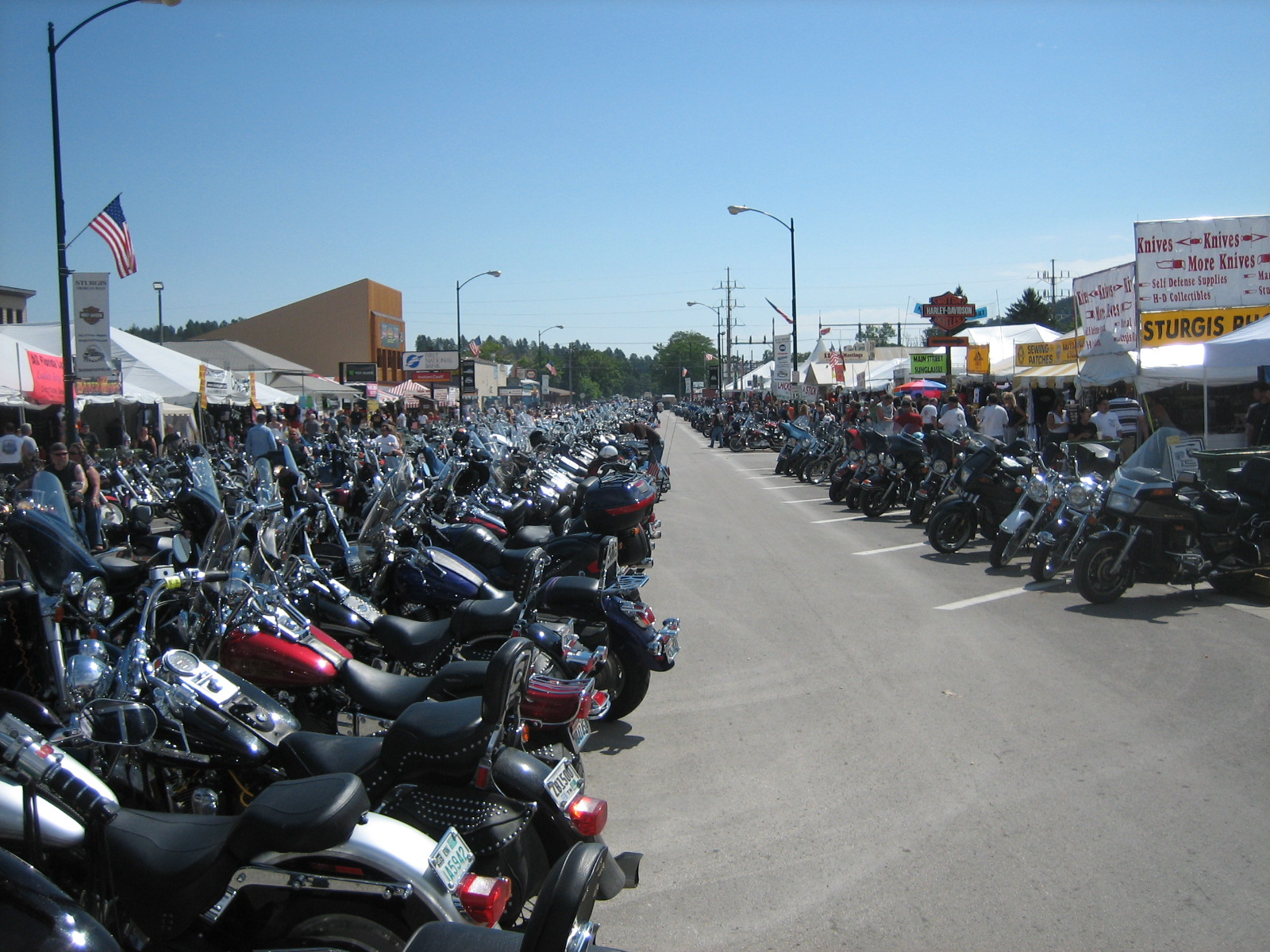
Motorbikes on Main Street during Bike Week

- Fort Meade Recreation Area
- Sturgis Motorcycle Museum & Hall of Fame
- South Dakota Centennial Trail
- Loud American Roadhouse
- Poker Alice House, formerly the bordello of the frontier gambler Alice Ivers Tubbs, known as Poker Alice

=== Public sculptures ===
- Kinship at the Sturgis Community Center
- General Samuel D. Sturgis at the Hills and Plains Park at the east entrance to town
- Jesus in the Garden at the First United Methodist Church Memorial Garden
- St. Francis of Assisi at the St. Francis of Assisi Catholic Church
- STURGIS spelled out in letters

== Media ==
=== Radio stations ===
- KBHB 810 (AM)
- KRCS 93.1 (FM)

== Education ==
It is in Meade School District 46-1.

== Notable people ==
- Robert Willard "Bobby" Buntrock, child actor in classic sitcoms
- Raymond W. Carpenter, United States Army Major General (Born in Sturgis, graduated from Sturgis Brown High School)
- Francis H. Case, former resident, journalist and politician
- Scott DesJarlais, former resident, physician and politician
- Carroll Hardy, born in Sturgis, former Major League Baseball player
- J.C. "Pappy" Hoel, Credited with starting the Sturgis Motorcycle Rally
- Alice Ivers Duffield Tubbs Huckert, better known as Poker Alice, frontier gambler, lived her later years in Sturgis
- Marty Jackley, Attorney General of South Dakota, born in Sturgis
- Herbert A. Littleton, former resident, posthumous recipient of the Medal of Honor
- Megan Mahoney, former resident, basketball player
- Paige McPherson, Olympic bronze medalist in taekwondo
- Larry Rhoden, born in Sturgis, 34th Governor of South Dakota
- Rex Terry, born in Sturgis, banker and South Dakota politician

== See also ==
- Bear Butte Creek
- Vanocker Creek
