= List of National Natural Landmarks in South Dakota =

There are 13 National Natural Landmarks in South Dakota.

South Dakota National Natural Landmarks (clickable map)

Name	Image	Date	Location	County	Ownership	Description
Ancient River Warren Channel		1965		Grant	mixed- state, private	A channel cut by the Ancient River Warren during the Ice Age.
Bear Butte		1965	44.475833°N 103.426944°W	Meade	mixed- state, tribal, private	A cone-shaped mass of igneous rock standing alone 1,300 feet (400 m) above the surrounding plains.
Bijou Hills		1976	43.517778°N 99.147222°W	Charles Mix	private	An excellent example of an erosional remnant of soft clays and shales capped by a channel sandstone and quartzite.
Buffalo Slough		1980	43.874308°N 96.939013°W	Lake	state	Excellent examples of a prairie pothole with native emergent vegetation, and a native bluestem prairie.
The Castles		1976	45.527583°N 103.170965°W	Harding	federal (Custer National Forest)	Steep-walled, flat-topped buttes standing 200 to 400 feet (61 to 122 m) above the surrounding prairie.
Cathedral Spires and Limber Pine Natural Area	Needles	1976	43.841111°N 103.544444°W	Custer	state (Custer State Park)	An excellent, rare example of joint-controlled weathering of granite.
Cottonwood Slough-Dry Run		1975	44.957077°N 97.193497°W	Roberts	mixed- state, private	A completely undisturbed wetland complex including potholes, streams, shallow open water, lakes, and marsh.
Fort Randall Eagle Roost		1967	43.0244°N 98.6242°W	Gregory	federal (Missouri National Recreational River)	A prime winter roosting area for bald and golden eagles.
Lake Thompson		1975	44.285°N 97.461944°W	Kingsbury	state	Contains a large undisturbed and unmanipulated marsh, an outstanding waterfowl breeding and resting area.
The Mammoth Site	Mammoth Site	1980	43.42471°N 103.48313°W	Fall River	private	One of the largest concentrations of mammoth remains in the United States.
Red Lake		1975	43.726352°N 99.22518°W	Brule	state	One of the largest remaining natural and unmanipulated prairie pothole lakes.
Sica Hollow		1967	45.741944°N 97.2425°W	Marshall	state	Displays many facets of natural history.
Snake Butte		1967		Jackson	tribal (Oglala Sioux)	Illustrates one of two types of sand calcite deposits in the world.

== See also ==
- List of National Historic Landmarks in South Dakota
