= National Register of Historic Places listings in Brule County, South Dakota =

Location of Brule County in South Dakota

This is a list of the National Register of Historic Places listings in Brule County, South Dakota.

This is intended to be a complete list of the properties on the National Register of Historic Places in Brule County, South Dakota, United States. The locations of National Register properties for which the latitude and longitude coordinates are included below, may be seen in a map.

There are 7 properties listed on the National Register in the county. Two other site that were once listed have been removed.

This National Park Service list is complete through NPS recent listings posted March 21, 2025.

== Current listings ==
	Name on the Register	Image	Date listed	Location	City or town	Description
1	Ashley Shanty and Privy		December 17, 1999 (#99001580)	RR1, Box 100; 43°45′36″N 99°05′03″W	Pukwana	part of the Federal Relief Construction in South Dakota Multiple Property Submission (MPS)
2	Chamberlain Bridge	Chamberlain Bridge	September 14, 2001 (#01000999)	Interstate 90 loop over the Missouri River; 43°48′41″N 99°20′14″W	Chamberlain	part of the Historic Bridges in South Dakota MPS
3	Chamberlain Rest Stop Tipi	Chamberlain Rest Stop Tipi	January 20, 2015 (#14001177)	I-90 between exits 263 & 265; 43°47′12″N 99°20′24″W	Chamberlain vicinity	
4	Robert A. Crawford House	Robert A. Crawford House	December 1, 1994 (#94001392)	204 16th Ave., W. 43°48′02″N 99°20′21″W	Chamberlain	
5	Dunlap Methodist Episcopal Church		June 14, 2001 (#01000666)	Junction of 369th Ave. and 264th St. 43°33′27″N 98°49′59″W	Platte	
6	Holy Trinity Church	Holy Trinity Church	November 15, 1983 (#83004205)	Off Interstate 90; 43°44′18″N 98°57′28″W	Kimball	
7	Edward Morrison House		August 30, 2005 (#05000945)	624 Main St. 43°46′37″N 99°10′52″W	Pukwana	

== Former listings ==
	Name on the Register	Image	Date listed	Date removed	Location	City or town	Description
1	O.G. Bradshaw Elevator		February 15, 2012 (#12000034)	September 10, 2012	220 W. Railroad St. 43°44′56″N 98°57′38″W	Kimball	Removed due to procedural error.
2	Taft Hotel		March 13, 1986 (#86000243)	July 27, 1989	200 S. Main	Chamberlain	Relocated in 1989. Destroyed by arsonist on August 18, 1990.

== See also ==
- List of National Historic Landmarks in South Dakota
- National Register of Historic Places listings in South Dakota
