= Lyonville, South Dakota =

Unincorporated community in South Dakota, U.S.

Coordinates: 43°52′40″N 98°58′14″W

Lyonville is an unincorporated community in Brule County, in the U.S. state of South Dakota.

== History ==
Lyonville was laid out in 1886. A post office called Lyonville was established in 1882, and remained in operation until 1945. Charles Lyons, an early postmaster, most likely gave the community his name.
