= America Lake =

Lake in South Dakota, United States

- Location within South Dakota
- Location: America Township, Brule County, South Dakota
- Coordinates: 43°32′32″N 99°13′08″W
- Type: Lake
- Basin countries: United States
- Surface area: 12 acres (4.9 ha)
- Surface elevation: 1,790 feet (550 m)

America Lake is a lake located in America Township, Brule County, South Dakota, United States. It is 5 miles (8.0 km) west of Bijou Hills and covers an area of 12 acres (4.9 ha).

An unnamed intermittent stream flows out of the lake and empties into the Francis Case Reservoir on the Missouri River.

The lake was named after the township it is located in by Works Progress Administration workers.
