= Grass Ranch Colony, South Dakota =

- Census-designated place
- Location within South Dakota Location within the United States
- Coordinates: 43°39′00″N 98°53′01″W
- Country: United States
- State: South Dakota
- County: Brule

Area
  - Total: 1.06 sq mi (2.75 km^{2})
  - Land: 1.06 sq mi (2.75 km^{2})
  - Water: 0 sq mi (0.00 km^{2})
- Elevation: 1,641 ft (500 m)

Population (2020)
  - Total: 14
  - Density: 13.2/sq mi (5.08/km^{2})
- Time zone: UTC-6 (Central (CST))
  - Summer (DST): UTC-5 (CDT)
- ZIP Code: 57355 (Kimball)
- Area code: 605
- FIPS code: 46-25743
- GNIS feature ID: 2813001

Grass Ranch Colony is a Hutterite colony and census-designated place (CDP) in Brule County, South Dakota, United States. The population was 14 at the 2020 census. It was first listed as a CDP prior to the 2020 census.

It is in the southeast part of the county, 11 miles (18 km) southeast of Kimball.

== Demographics ==
Historical population
Census	Pop.	Note	%±
2020	14		—
U.S. Decennial Census
