= Cedar Grove Colony, South Dakota =

- Census-designated place
- Location within South Dakota Location within the United States
- Coordinates: 43°31′54″N 98°48′16″W
- Country: United States
- State: South Dakota
- County: Brule

Area
  - Total: 0.49 sq mi (1.27 km^{2})
  - Land: 0.47 sq mi (1.22 km^{2})
  - Water: 0.019 sq mi (0.05 km^{2})
- Elevation: 1,611 ft (491 m)

Population (2020)
  - Total: 0
  - Density: 0/sq mi (0/km^{2})
- Time zone: UTC-6 (Central (CST))
  - Summer (DST): UTC-5 (CDT)
- ZIP Code: 57369 (Platte)
- Area code: 605
- FIPS code: 46-10835
- GNIS feature ID: 2813002

Cedar Grove Colony is a Hutterite colony and census-designated place (CDP) in Brule County, South Dakota, United States. The population was 0 at the 2020 census. It was first listed as a CDP prior to the 2020 census.

It is in the southeast corner of the county, 12 miles (19 km) north of Platte and 22 miles (35 km) south-southeast of Kimball.

== Demographics ==
Historical population
Census	Pop.	Note	%±
2020	0		—
U.S. Decennial Census
