= Pukwana =

Pukwana may refer to:

- Pukwana, South Dakota, USA
- Pukwana Beach, Wisconsin, USA
- Dudu Pukwana (1938–1990), South African saxophonist, composer and pianist
