= Alma Lloyd (politician) =

American politician

Member of the South Dakota House of Representatives from the 5th district district
- In office 1960–1960
- Preceded by: Frank F. Llyod
- Succeeded by: Carl H. Furchner

Personal details
- Born: Alma Forman; April 12, 1912 Bijou Hills, South Dakota
- Died: December 31 1985 (aged 73) Platte, South Dakota
- Party: Democratic

Alma Lloyd (January 8 1906 – December 31, 1985) was an American politician who served in the South Dakota House of Representatives as a Democrat. She was appointed to fill her husband's seat after his death in 1959. She was sworn in on February 9 1960.

She graduated from Ward Academy and taught in Eagle township for several years. Alma married Frank Lloyd in 1927. She died in Platte, South Dakota in 1985.
