= Chamberlain Bridge (Chamberlain, South Dakota) =

- U.S. National Register of Historic Places
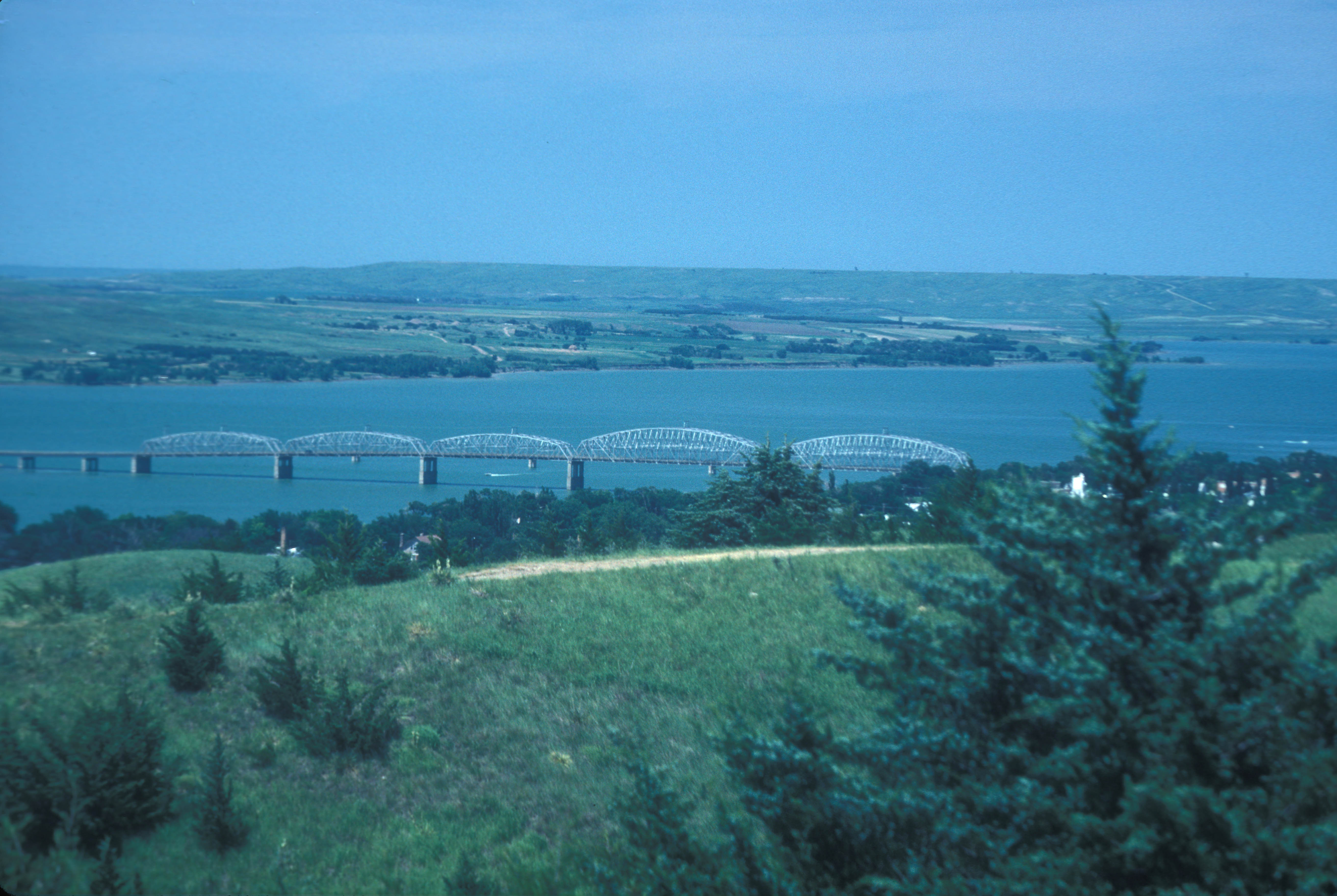

- Location within South Dakota Location within the United States
- Location: I-90 BL over the Missouri River, Chamberlain, South Dakota
- Coordinates: 43°48′41″N 99°20′14″W
- Area: less than one acre
- Built: 1925
- Built by: State Highway Commission
- Architectural style: Pennsylvania through truss
- MPS: Historic Bridges in South Dakota MPS
- NRHP reference No.: 01000999
- Added to NRHP: September 14, 2001

The Chamberlain Bridge, is a historic bridge connecting the towns of Chamberlain and Oacoma across the Missouri River and Lake Francis Case in Brule County, South Dakota. The bridge was originally completed in 1925 and carried U.S. Route 16 (US 16) over the Missouri River.

In 1953, Lake Francis Case was created by the new Fort Randall Dam and the bridge became obsolete. The Wheeler Bridge, also completed in 1925, was floated up the river 70 miles (110 km) and the two bridges were joined to span the new lake. The bridge now carries Interstate 90 Business (I-90 Bus.). The main path of I-90 crosses the lake on a modern bridge 1 mile (1.6 km) south of the Chamberlain Bridge and a railroad bridge crosses about 300 yards (270 m) south of I-90.

Chamberlain Bridge is designated South Dakota Department of Transportation bridge no. 08-068-084 and was listed on the National Register of Historic Places in 2001.

== 1925 bridge ==
In 1923 South Dakota's bridge fund had a balance of $4 and groups from Rosebud, Chamberlain, Pierre, Forest City and Mobridge asked the state legislature to fund a bridge in their location to cross the Missouri River. State bridge engineer John Edward Kirkham promised that he could build all five bridges for $2 million, even though a single bridge at Bismarck, North Dakota across the Missouri had recently cost $1.3 million. Kirkham later fulfilled his promise, building all five bridges for a total of $2.1 million.

Pre-1953 postcard of the original bridge

The original Chamberlain Bridge was composed of four 336-foot riveted Pennsylvania through truss spans laid end to end. It was built by the Missouri Valley Bridge & Iron Works of Leavenworth, Kansas and completed in September 1925 at an estimated cost of $303,623.

The Wheeler Bridge, originally known as the Rosebud Bridge, was composed of six 256-foot pin-connected Pennsylvania through truss spans. It was built by the Kansas City Bridge Company with steel provided by the American Bridge Co. and also completed in September 1925. Its estimated cost was $771,080. This bridge with its pin-connections, was designed to be disassembled because Kirkham thought that it might be replaced with a combined railroad-highway bridge.

== 1953 bridge ==
As the waters of Lake Francis Case began to rise in 1953, sections of the Wheeler Bridge were floated northward to construct the new Chamberlain Bridge. The new bridge site was slightly south of the old bridge site and the bridge was in effect widened by using two parallel bridge spans to replace one span on the old bridge. The four spans of the old Chamberlain bridge formed the easternmost two double-spans of the new bridge. The six smaller spans from the Wheeler Bridge formed the westernmost three double-spans of the new bridge. The cost of construction was $4.5 million and the new bridge was dedicated on December 7, 1953.

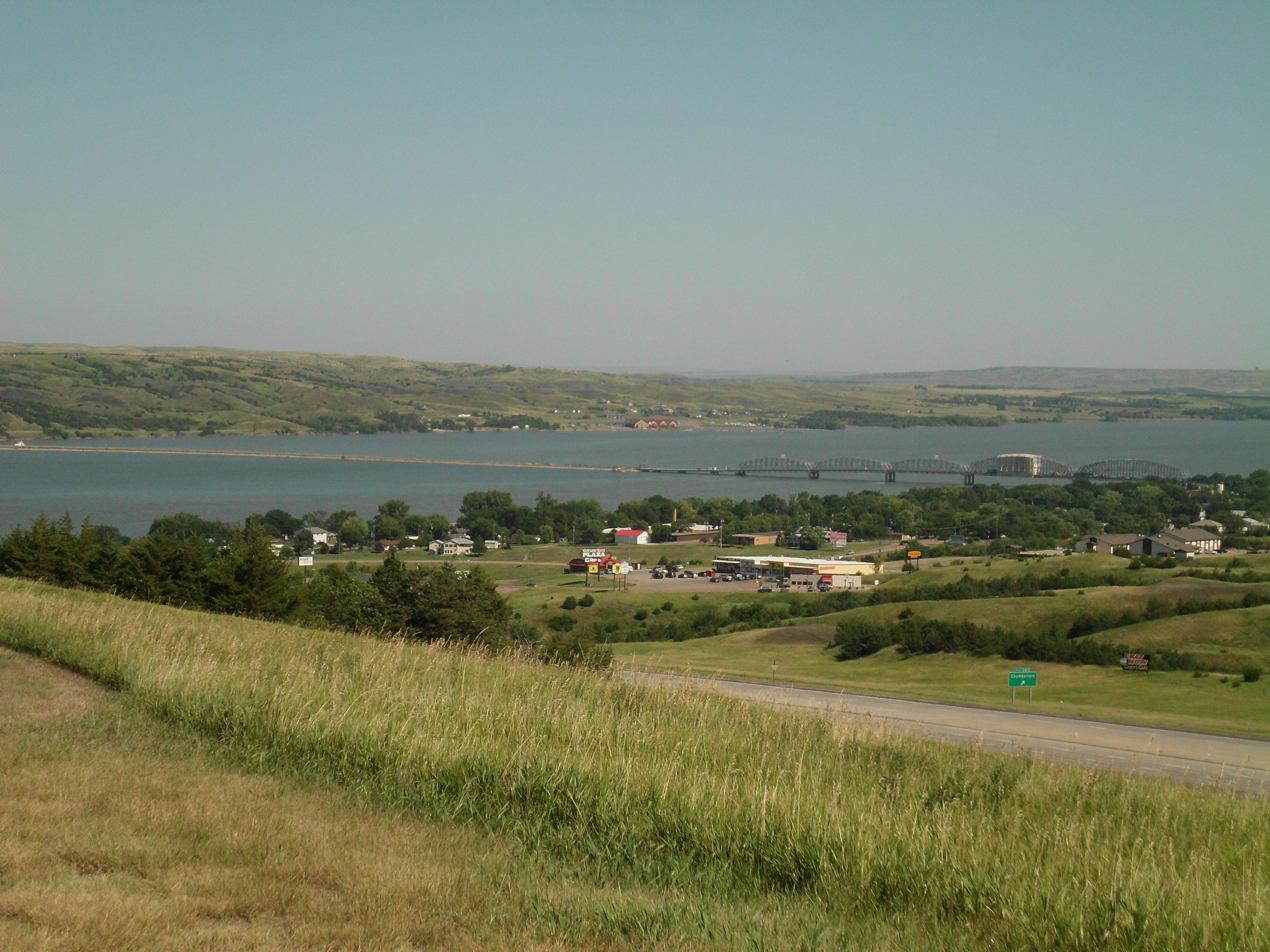
Chamberlain Bridge in the distance, taken from a rest stop on I-90

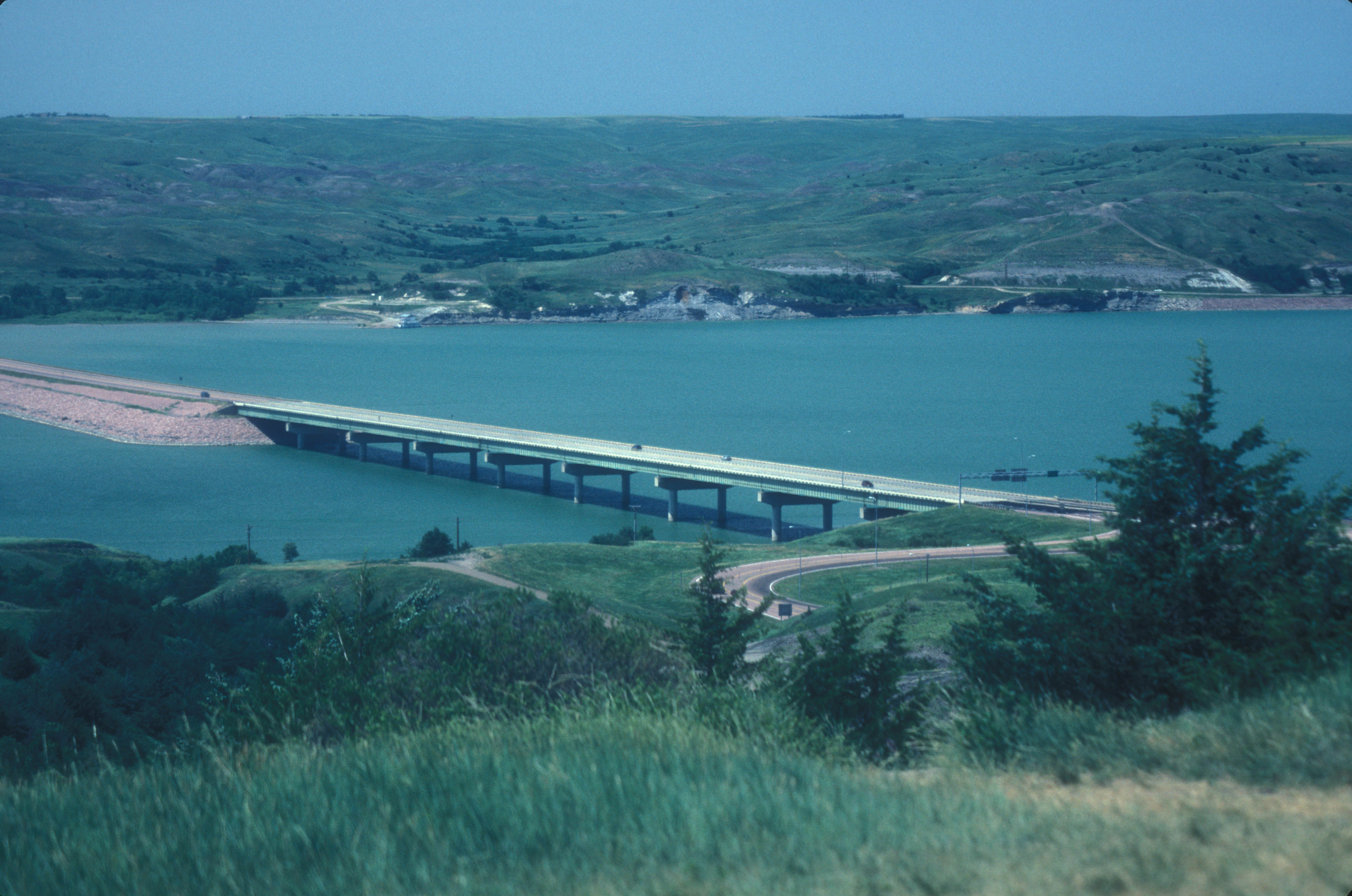
I-90 bridge, south of the Chamberlain Bridge
43°48′06″N 99°21′12″W

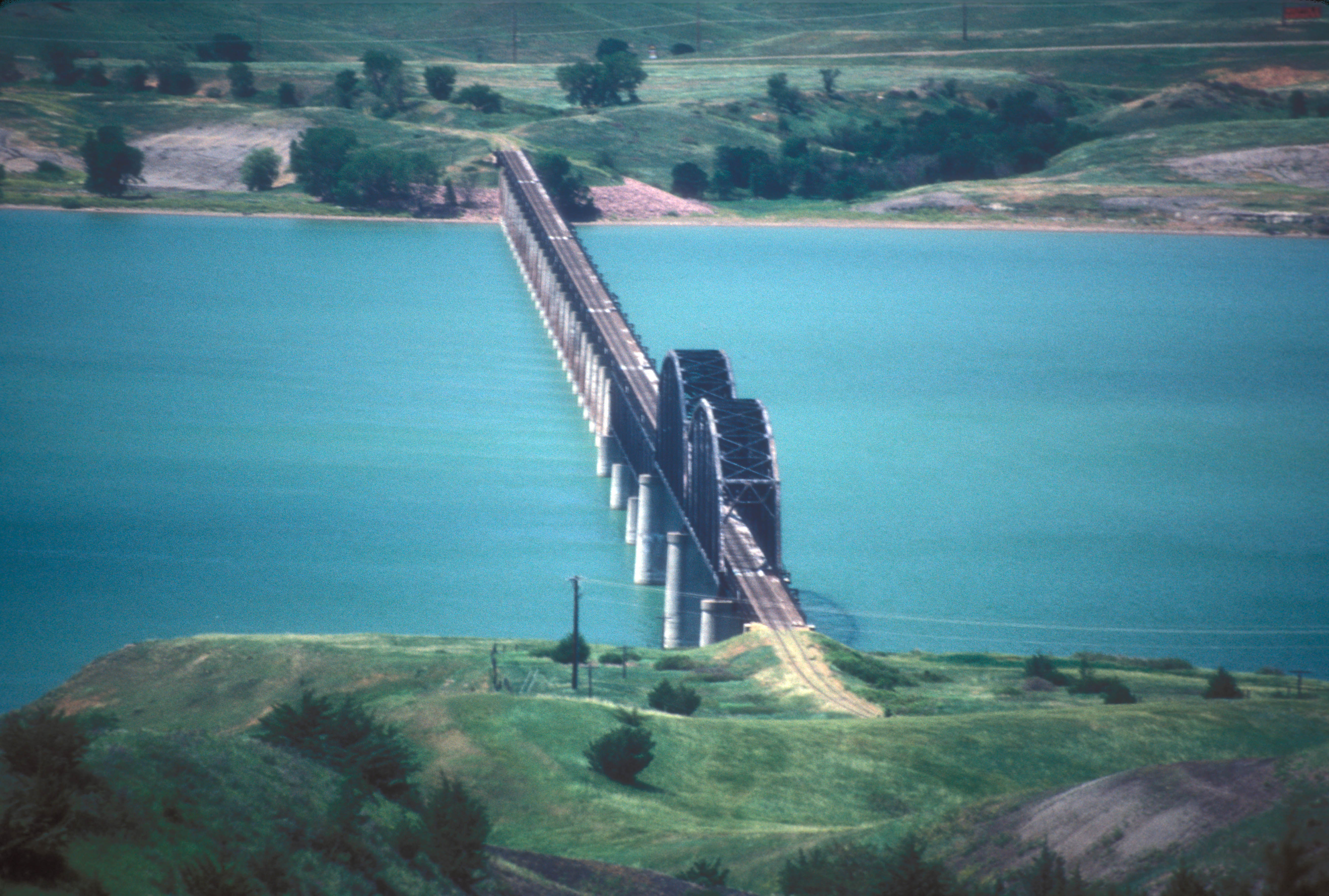
Railroad bridge, south of the I-90 bridge
43°47′56″N 99°21′33″W

== See also ==
- List of crossings of the Missouri River
- List of bridges on the National Register of Historic Places in South Dakota
- National Register of Historic Places listings in Brule County, South Dakota
- National Register of Historic Places listings in Lyman County, South Dakota
