= Edward Morrison =

Edward or Ed Morrison may refer to:

== Sportspeople ==
- Edward Morrison (American football) (1894–1961), American college football coach
- Edward Morrison (boxer) in New Zealand at the 1958 British Empire and Commonwealth Games
- Ed Morrison (rugby union) (Edward Francis Morrison), English rugby union referee
- Eddie Morrison, Scottish footballer and manager

== Others ==
- Edward R. Morrison, American legal scholar
- Edward Morrison (Canadian Army officer) (1867–1925), Canadian journalist and general
- Edward Morrison (British Army officer), governor of Chester, 1795–1844
- Edward Morrison (politician), lieutenant-governor of Jamaica, 1811–1813
- Eddy Morrison, right wing British activist
- Edward Morrison, owner of Edward Morrison House
- Edward Morrison, character in Mr. Skeffington
- Ed Morrison (Hollyoaks), Hollyoaks character
