= Red Lake (South Dakota) =

Wetland in the state of South Dakota, United States

- Location within South Dakota Location within the United States
- Location: Brule County, South Dakota
- Coordinates: 43.7264°N 99.2252°W
- Basin countries: United States
- Surface area: 3,951 acres (15.99 km^{2})

U.S. National Natural Landmark
- Designated: 1975

Red Lake is a body of water in Brule County, South Dakota, United States. It is defined as a prairie pothole. The pothole is located east of the Missouri River, near the population center of Pukwana. Owned by the State of South Dakota, the body of water was listed as a National Natural Landmark in 1975.

== Description ==
The National Park Service describes Red Lake as follows:

One of the largest remaining natural and unmanipulated prairie pothole lakes, Red Lake is a valuable waterfowl breeding and resting area.
