= Dunlap Methodist Episcopal Church =

Historic church in South Dakota, United States

- U.S. National Register of Historic Places
- Location within South Dakota Location within the United States
- Nearest city: Platte, South Dakota
- Coordinates: 43°33′27″N 98°49′59″W
- Area: 2 acres (0.81 ha)
- Built: 1902
- Architectural style: Late Gothic Revival
- NRHP reference No.: 01000666
- Added to NRHP: June 14, 2001

Dunlap Methodist Episcopal Church is a historic church in Brule County, South Dakota, located 12 miles north of Platte, South Dakota. It was built in 1902 and was added to the National Register in 2001.

It is a wood-frame church on a stone foundation.

The Dunlap cemetery, deemed contributing, was established at approximately the same time as the church. It includes gravestones dating from 1893 to 2001.

The church was deemed notable "as a well-preserved example of simplified vernacular gothic architectural style and represents the first generation church construction in the eastern portion of the state."
