= Barringer Slough =

Wetland in Iowa, United States

Coordinates: 43.147°N 94.932°W

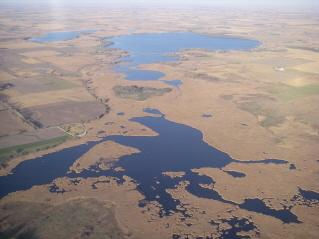
Aerial photo of Barringer Slough.

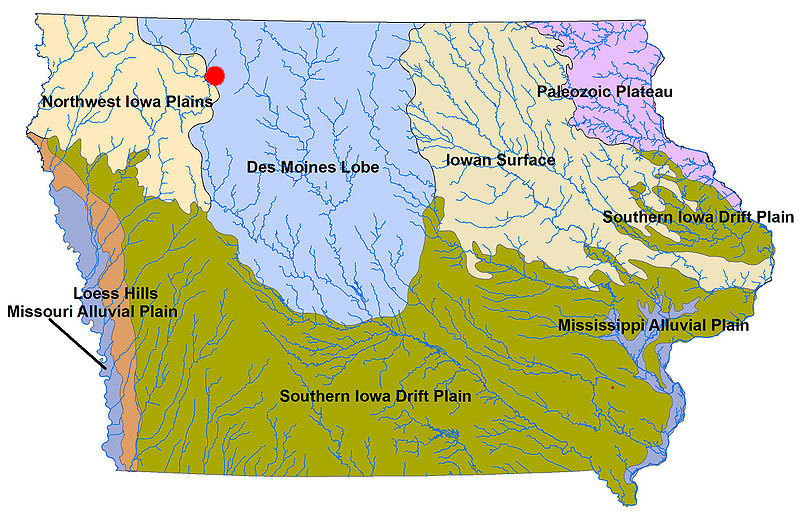
Barringer Slough (red) on landform map of Iowa.

Barringer Slough is a rich wetland area located in northeast Clay County in northwestern Iowa. This area is a reconstructed remnant of the Des Moines lobe, a region of Iowa which was once covered by interconnected prairie wetlands. This wetland marsh and the surrounding public uplands cover 1,526 acres (6.18 km^{2}). Vegetation includes cattails, coontail, sedges, marsh marigold, and duck weed. Muskrats, herons, pelicans, and ducks are also plentiful. In the winter pheasants and deer migrate onto the slough to take advantage of the vegetative cover. During periods of high water it is possible to canoe from Lost Island Lake on the north side to the outlet on the south end through a narrow channel.
