= Geography of Iowa =

Simplified map of Iowa

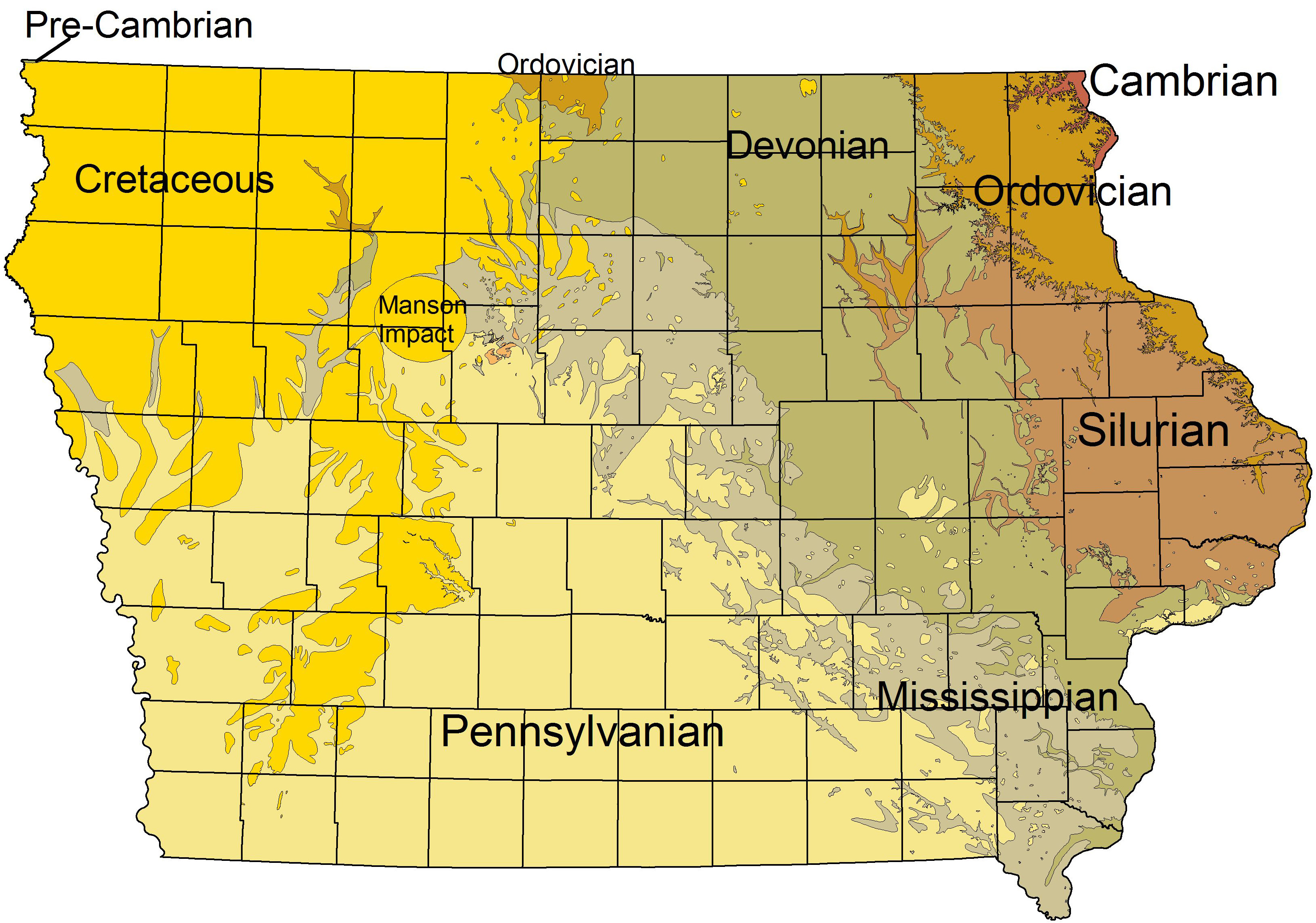
Bedrock formations of Iowa

The geography of Iowa includes the study of bedrock, landforms, rivers, geology, paleontology and urbanisation of the U.S. state of Iowa. The state covers an area of 56,272.81 sq mi (145,746 km^{2}).

== Bedrock features ==
Iowa's bedrock geology generally increases in age from west to east. In northwest Iowa Cretaceous bedrock is ca. 74 million years old; in eastern Iowa Cambrian bedrock dates to ca. 500 million years ago.

=== Meteor impact structures ===
==== Manson impact structure ====
Seventy-four million years ago, a large asteroid crashed into what is now southeast Pocahontas county creating the Manson crater. Nearly 22 miles in diameter, it would have killed most animals within 650 miles, roughly an area from modern Denver to Detroit. This was originally thought to have been one of the causes of the dinosaur extinction, but recalculation of the impact's age indicates it occurred some 12 million years before the mass extinction. Although glaciation has erased all surface evidence of the impact, the bedrock associated with this impact is unique in Iowa.

==== Decorah crater ====
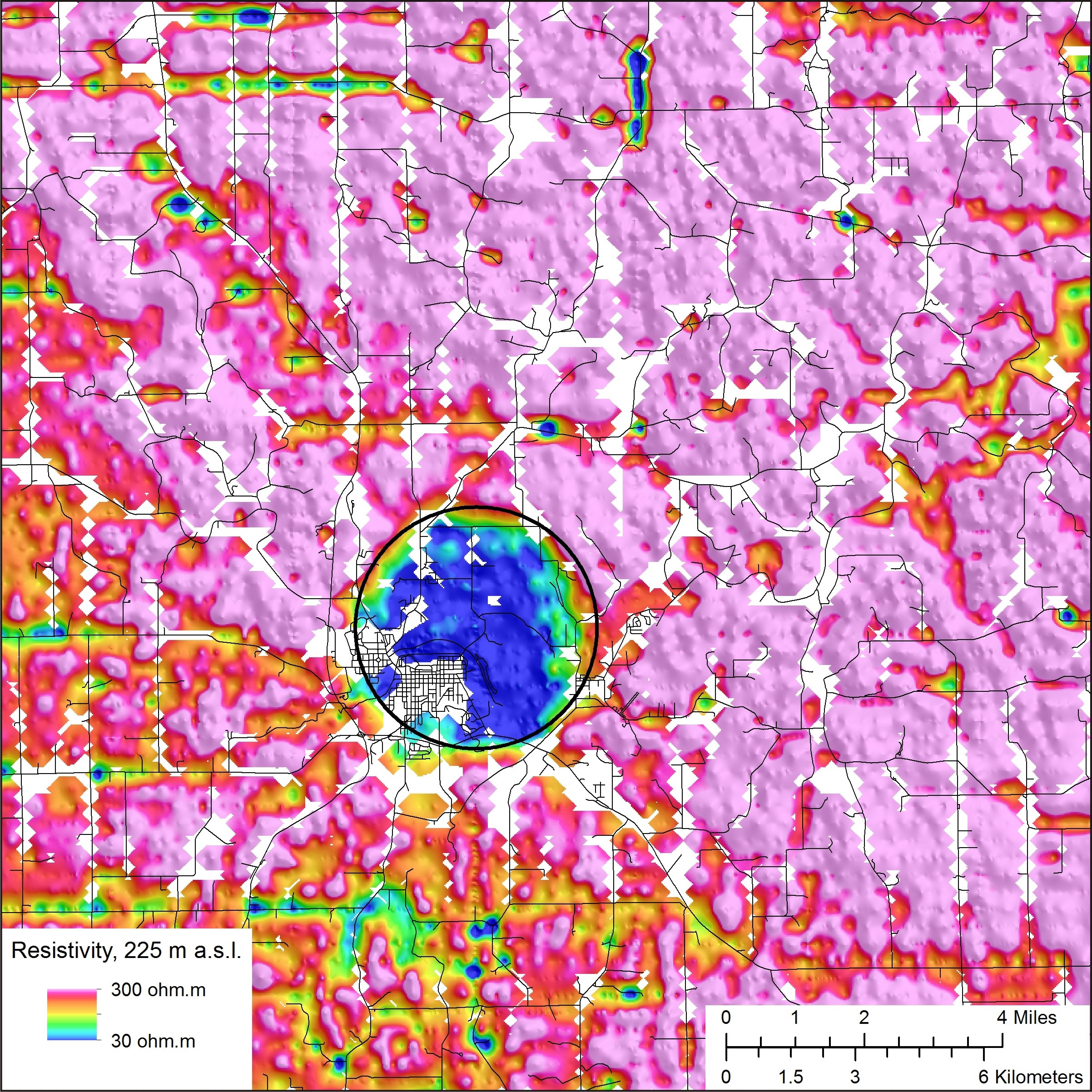
U.S. Geological Survey aerial resistivity map of the Decorah, Iowa area, showing the Decorah crater.

A much older meteorite strike created the Decorah crater during the Middle Ordovician Period, 470 million years ago. The crater is estimated to be 3.5 miles (5.6 km) in diameter, covered by Winneshiek Shale. There is no surface evidence of the impact, as the Winneshiek Shale is more than 50 feet below the bottom of the Upper Iowa River. The impact, equivalent to 1,000 megatons of TNT, did not appear to penetrate the Earth's mantle, but it did push down the underlying Ordovician and Cambrian bedrock several hundred feet. It may be one of several Middle Ordovician meteors that fell roughly simultaneously 469 million years ago, part of a proposed Ordovician meteor event.

=== Midcontinent rift ===
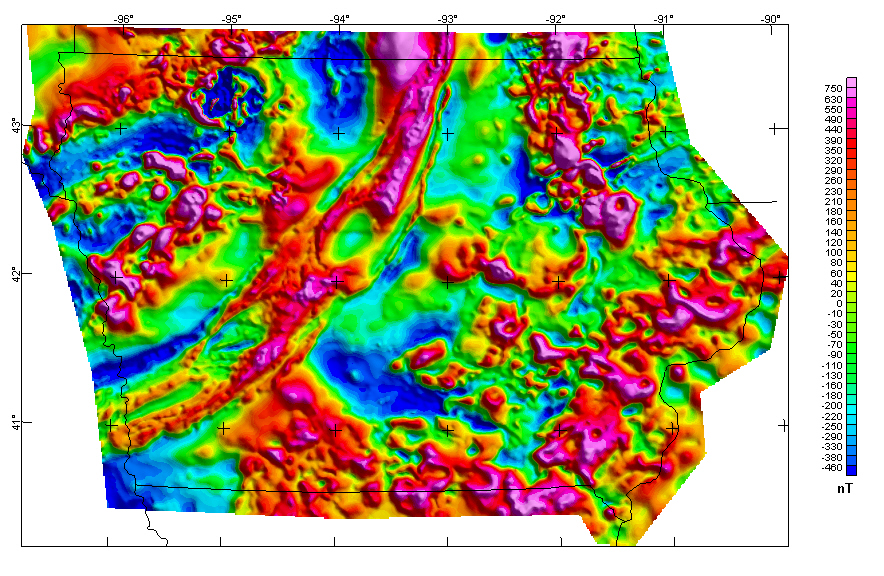
Iowa magnetic anomaly map showing the Midcontinent Rift curving from the north center to the southwest part of the state.

Buried deeply within Iowa's bedrock, the Midcontinent Rift System can be seen clearly in magnetic anomaly maps of Iowa. This is a billion-year-old tectonic plate scar that extends from Kansas through Lake Superior. This rift is not seismically active.

=== Seismic activity ===
No major active fault lines exist in Iowa, and Iowa is one of the most seismically stable states in the U.S. With the exception of the 1968 Illinois earthquake which caused the water tower at Lineville to leak, no injuries or significant damage has ever been caused by earthquakes in Iowa. Occasional small earthquakes occur near Fremont County in the far southwest, and the Sioux City area can occasionally be shaken by nearby temblors. Large earthquakes associated with the New Madrid Fault of far southern Illinois and Missouri can occasionally be felt in eastern Iowa. Recent earthquakes centered in Oklahoma have also been felt in Iowa, but have caused no damage.

=== Fossil fuels ===
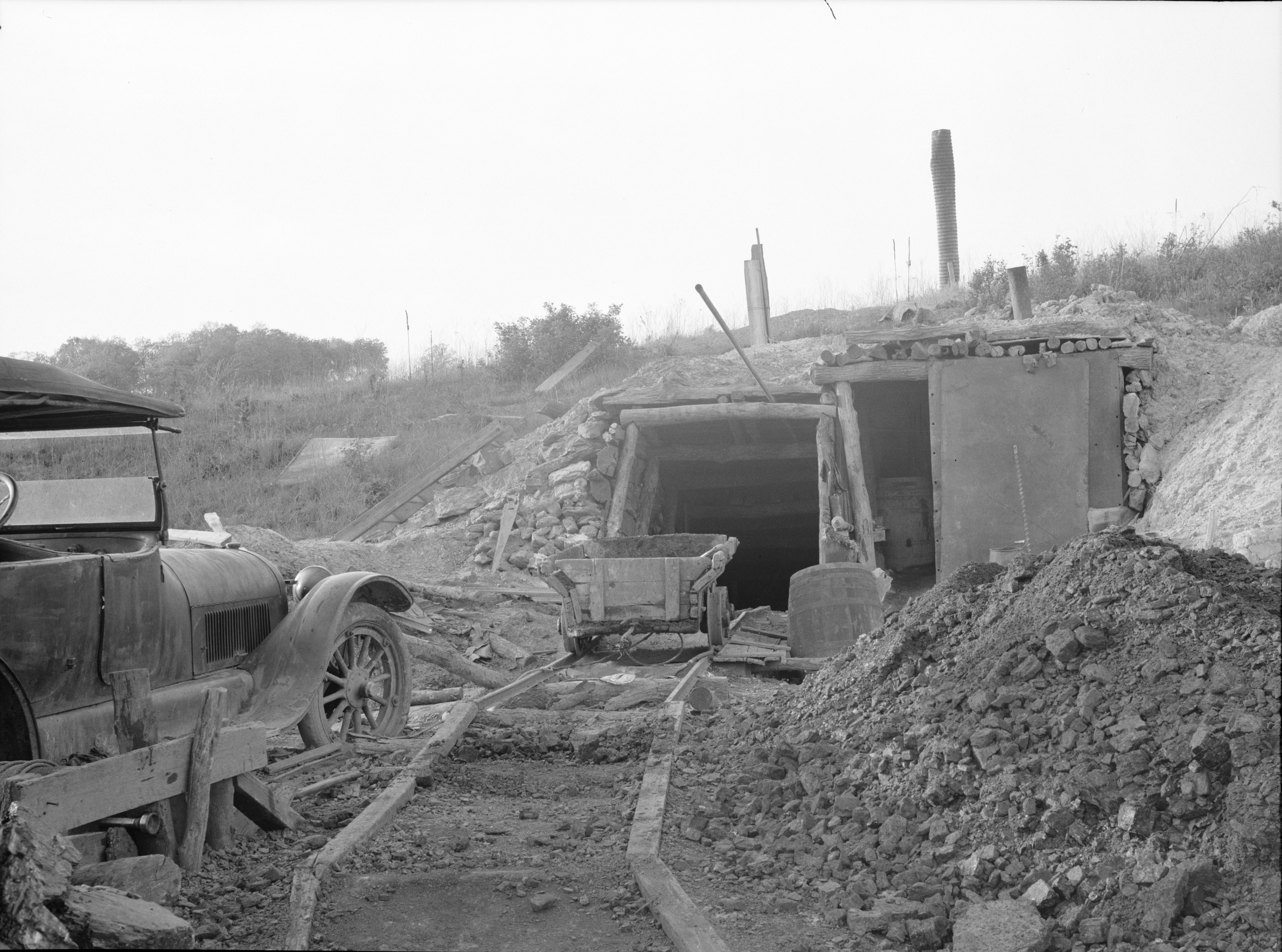
Iowa coal mine, 1936.

Historically, Iowa was a significant coal producer, particularly the Des Moines River valley from Coalville south. Much of the greater City of Des Moines area was mined. Boone and What Cheer were important in the late 19th century. In the 20th century, the most important mines were farther south around Albia, Centerville, Lucas and Oskaloosa. Iowa coal tends to be too high in sulfur for modern applications, and the last commercial mine closed in 1994.

Iowa has very limited natural gas and oil production.

=== Sioux quartzite ===
Although Iowa's bedrock is generally younger in western parts of the state, one exception is a small part of far northwest Iowa where Precambrian Sioux quartzite bedrock is found in northwest Lyon County. Sioux quartzite is a very hard rock of ruddy pink color used extensively in the region for road and railroad beds. Sioux quartzite has been dated to have been laid between 1.64 and 1.76 billion years ago.

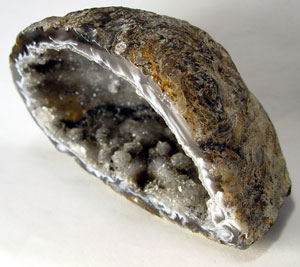
Geode half

=== Geodes ===
Geodes are found in southeast Iowa and are the official state rock. They consist of grey to pink cobbles within limestone that when cut or smashed open reveal a hollow crystal-filled interior. Geodes are common around Geode State Park in Henry County.

== Landforms and topography ==
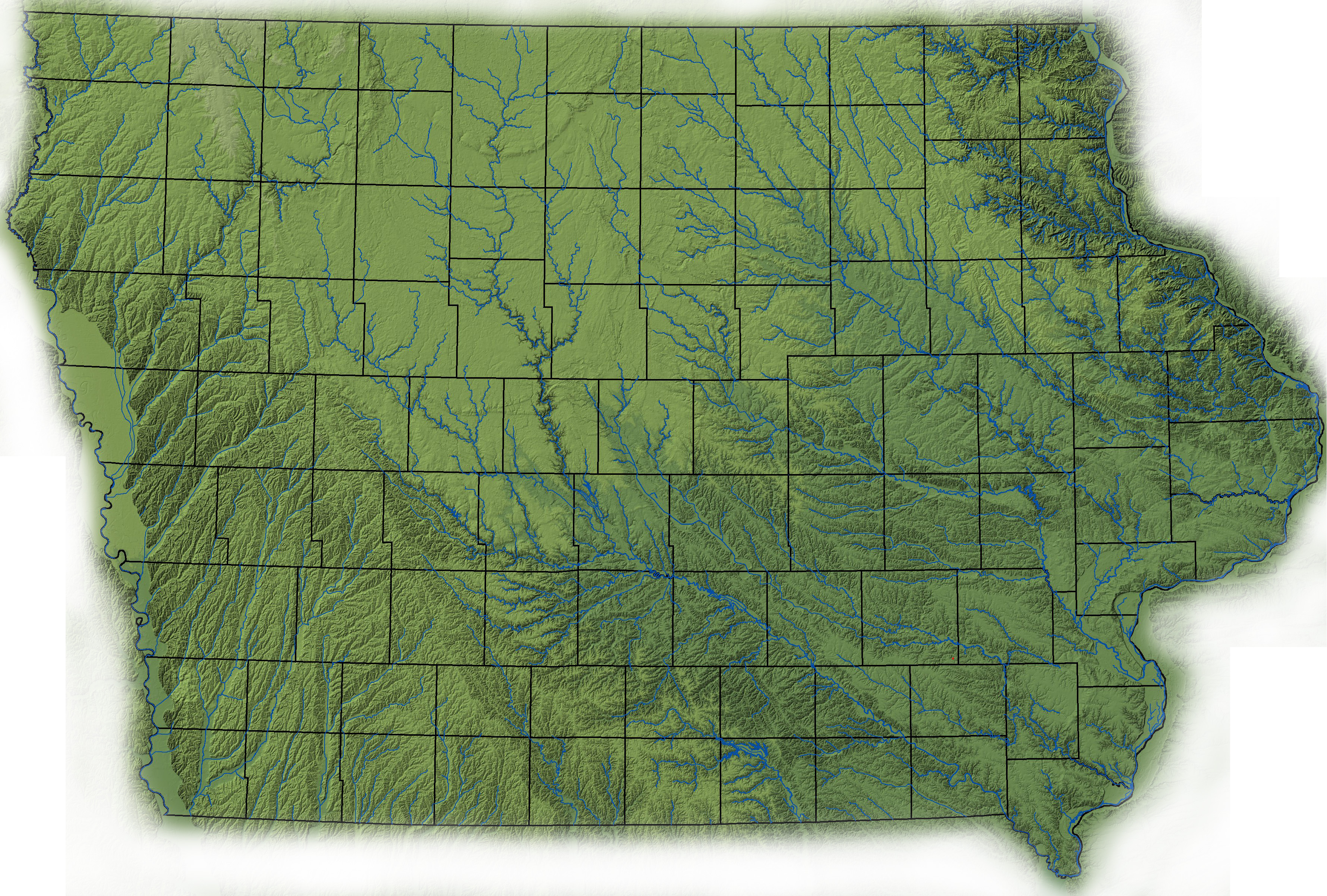
Topography of Iowa, with counties and major streams

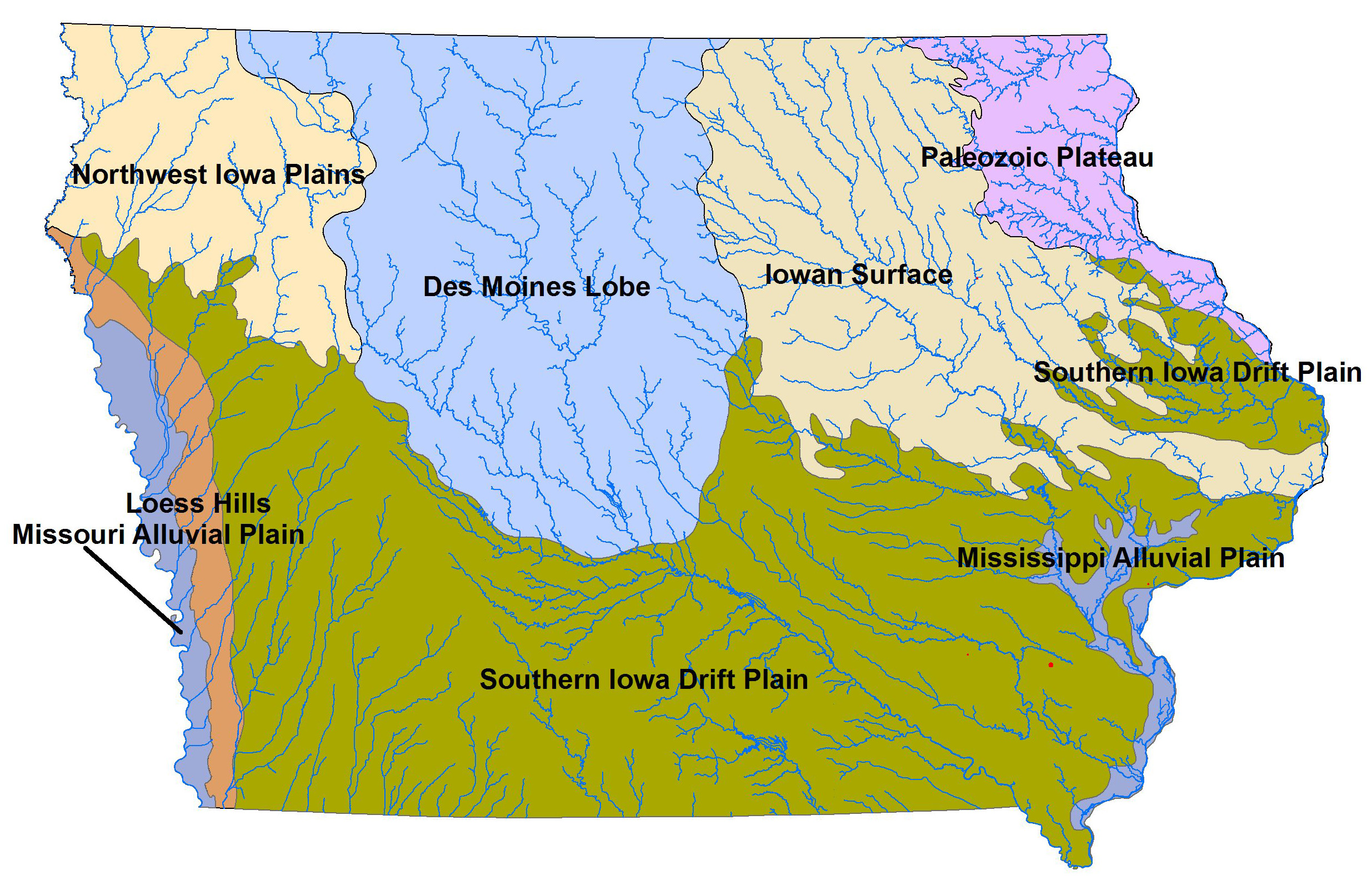
Landforms of Iowa, based on Prior (1991) and Calvin (1904), with major rivers and streams

Despite popular perception, Iowa is generally not flat; most of the state consists of rolling hills. Prior divides Iowa into eight landforms based on glaciation, soils, topography, and river drainage:

=== Paleozoic plateau ===
Also known as the Driftless Area, this region of scenic, high relief landscapes includes such features as resistant, bluff-forming bedrock outcrops, deep V-shaped valleys, caves, springs, and sinkholes. Glacial deposits and loess are thin or absent over most of the region.

=== Des Moines lobe ===
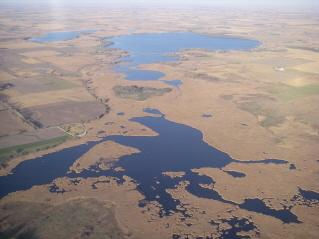
Barringer Slough, a remnant of the extensive prairie wetlands that once covered the Des Moines Lobe

Often called the Prairie Pothole Region, the Des Moines Lobe was glaciated up until 12,000 years ago during the Wisconsin glaciation. The area is marked by rolling terrain and ridges. Historically, this area was peppered with small interconnected swamps, most of which were drained for farmland. The Iowa Great Lakes occur along the western edge of the Des Moines lobe.

=== Southern Iowa drift plain ===
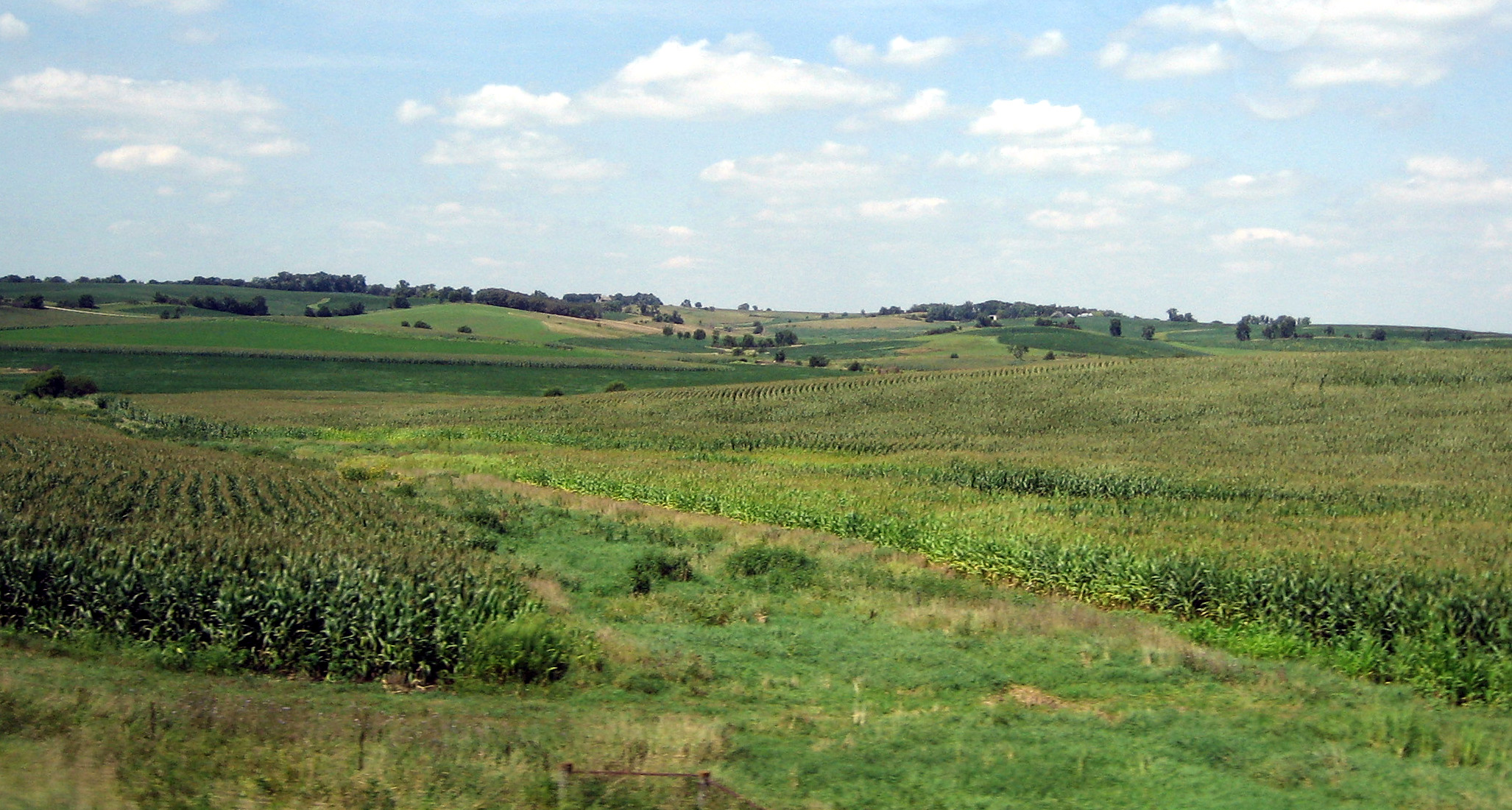
Typical view of the Southern Iowa Drift Plain

The southern Iowa drift plain covers most of the southern half of Iowa. This is probably the most familiar landscape to travelers, since most of Interstate 80 in Iowa runs through the SIDP. The classic Iowa landscape, consisting of rolling hills of Wisconsin-age loess on Illinoian (or earlier) till. The SIDP is some of the most productive agricultural land in the US.

=== Mississippi alluvial plain ===
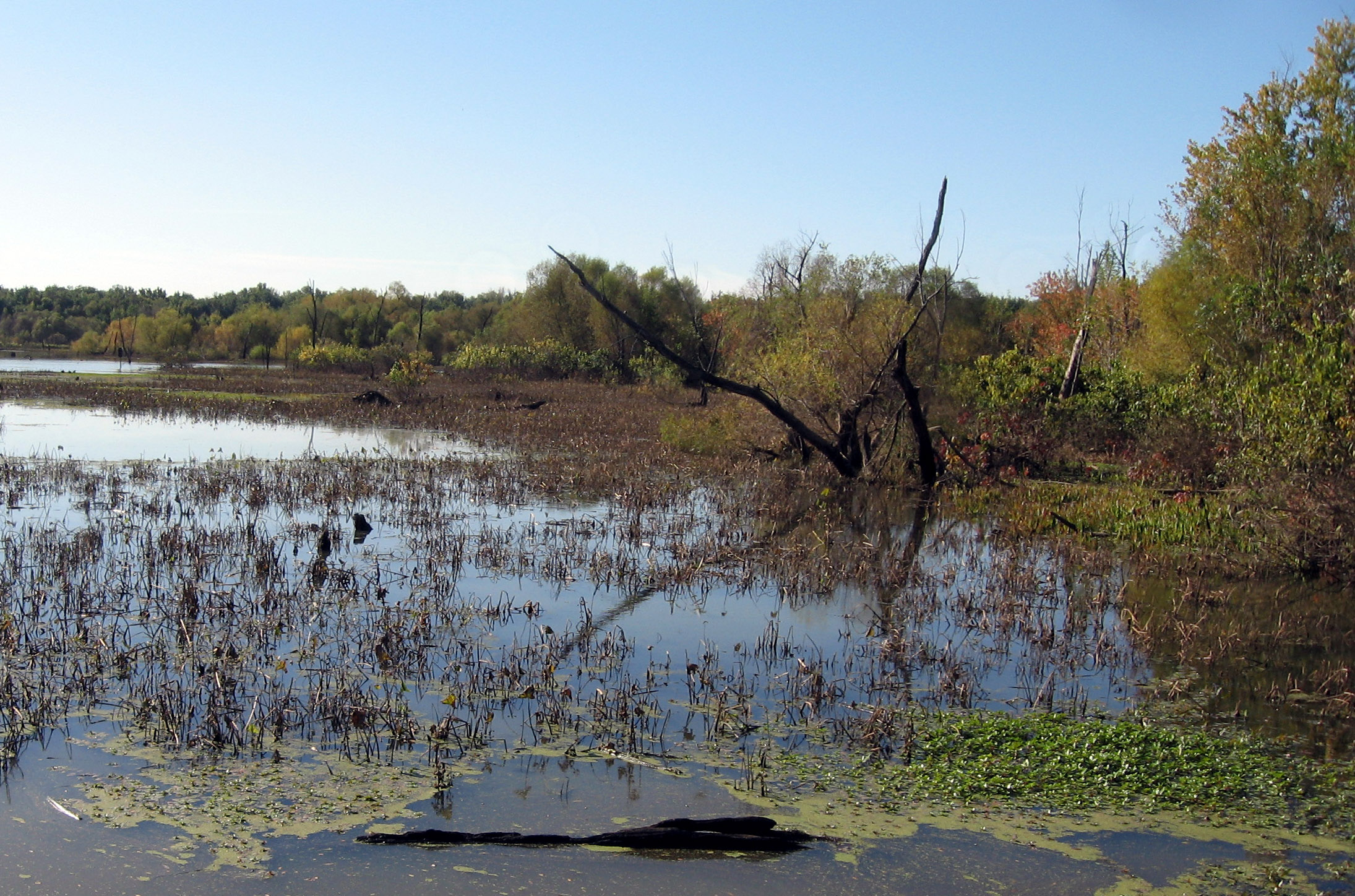
Mississippi Valley Wetland near Ft. Madison, Iowa

Generally level areas of stream terraces, paleochannels, backwater sloughs, and oxbow lakes are found within the broad Mississippi River valley.

=== Loess hills ===
The Loess Hills consist of very thick deposits of loess in far western Iowa deposited during the Wisconsin and Illinoian periods. Highly eroded, leaving stark, beautiful "golden hills".

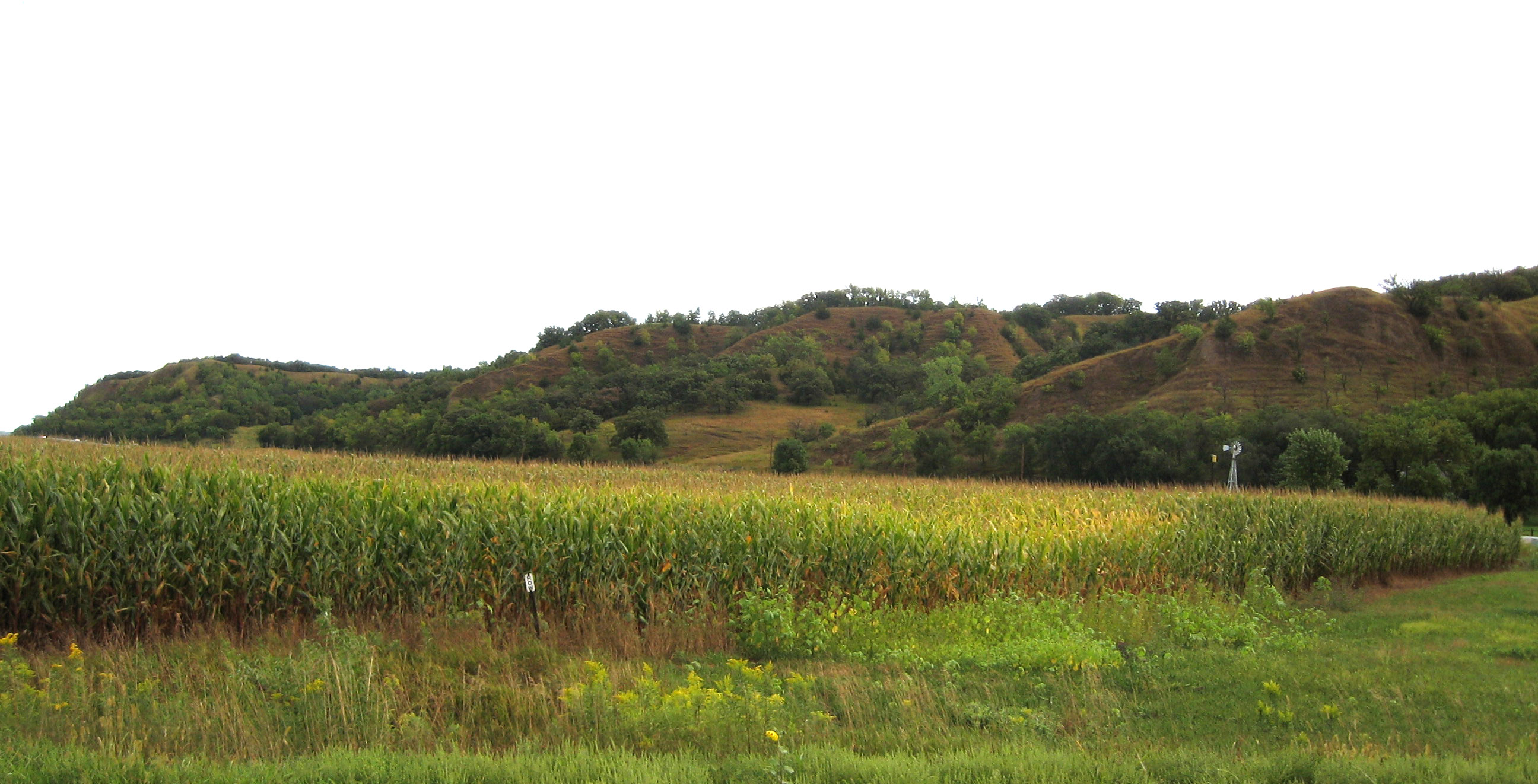
Loess Hills east of Mondamin, Iowa, showing the transition with the Missouri alluvial plain.

=== Iowan surface ===
Northeast Iowa is covered with eroded Pre-Illinoian till with moderate loess formation, frequently in the form of paha ridges, muted relief except for steep rolling hills near river valleys, and deeper valleys. These picturesque hills are depicted in many of the landscapes of Grant Wood.

=== Northwest Iowa plains ===
Like the Iowan Surface, the Northwest Iowa Plains are rolling hills consisting of eroded soils developed since pre-Wisconsinan glaciation, but with significant amounts of loess.

=== Missouri alluvial plain ===
Perhaps the only truly flat region of Iowa, the Missouri Alluvial Plain contains areas of terraces, sloughs, and oxbows. Its valley trench is not as deep as the Mississippi River system, and the Missouri River is contained in a much narrower channel. In Iowa, the eastern border of the Missouri Plains is the Loess Hills, forming steep rounded bluffs.

== Climate ==
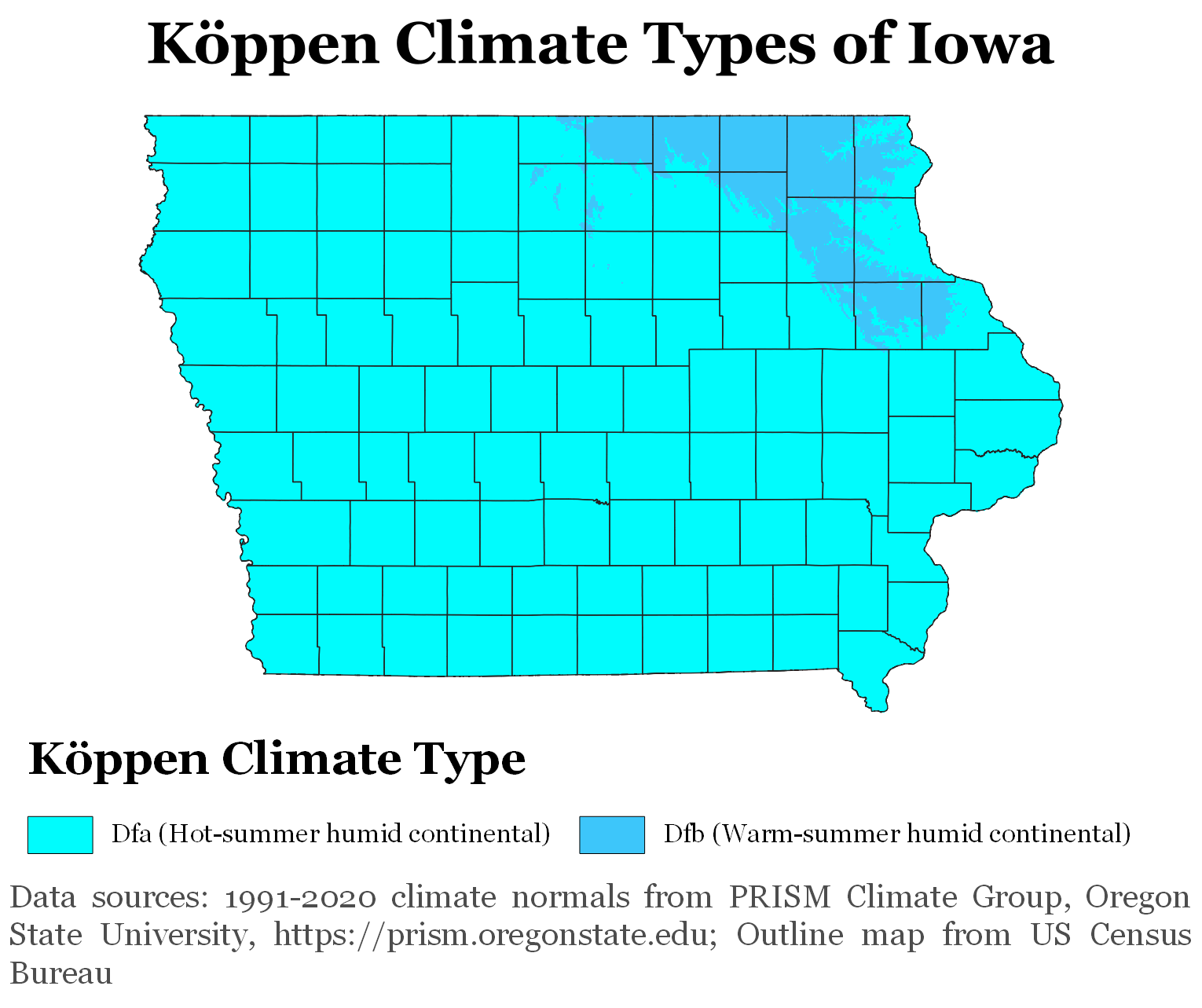
Köppen climate types of Iowa, using 1991–2020 climate normals.

Iowa has a humid continental climate throughout the state (Köppen climate classification Dfa) with extremes of both heat and cold. The average annual temperature at Des Moines is 50 °F (10 °C); for some locations in the north, such as Mason City, the figure is about 45 °F (7 °C), while Keokuk, on the Mississippi River, averages 52 °F (11 °C). Snowfall is common, with Des Moines getting about 26 days of snowfall a year, and other places, such as Shenandoah getting about 11 days of snowfall in a year.

Spring ushers in the beginning of the severe weather season. Iowa averages about 50 days of thunderstorm activity per year. The 30-year annual average of tornadoes in Iowa is 47. In 2008, twelve people were killed by tornadoes in Iowa, making it the deadliest year since 1968 and also the second most tornadoes in a year with 105, matching the total from 2001.

Iowa summers are known for heat and humidity, with daytime temperatures sometimes near 90 °F (32 °C) and occasionally exceeding 100 °F (38 °C). Average winters in the state have been known to drop well below freezing, even dropping below −18 °F (−28 °C). Iowa's all-time hottest temperature of 118 °F (48 °C) was recorded at Keokuk on July 20, 1934, during a nationwide heat wave; the all-time lowest temperature of −47 °F (−44 °C) was recorded in Washta on January 12, 1912.

Iowa has a relatively smooth gradient of varying precipitation across the state, with areas in the southeast of the state receiving an average of over 38 inches (97 cm) of rain annually, and the northwest of the state receiving less than 28 inches (71 cm). The pattern of precipitation across Iowa is seasonal, with more rain falling in the summer months. Virtually statewide, the driest month is January or February, and the wettest month is June, owing to frequent showers and thunderstorms, some of which produce hail, damaging winds and/or tornadoes. In Des Moines, roughly in the center of the state, over two-thirds of the 34.72 inches (88.2 cm) of rain falls from April through September, and about half the average annual precipitation falls from May through August, peaking in June.

=== Climate data ===
Monthly normal high and low temperatures for various Iowa cities (°F)
City	Jan	Feb	Mar	Apr	May	Jun	Jul	Aug	Sep	Oct	Nov	Dec
Davenport	30/13	36/19	48/29	61/41	72/52	81/63	85/68	83/66	76/57	65/45	48/32	35/20
Des Moines	31/14	36/19	49/30	62/41	72/52	82/62	86/67	84/65	76/55	63/43	48/31	34/18
Keokuk	34/17	39/21	50/30	63/42	73/52	83/62	87/67	85/65	78/56	66/44	51/33	33/21
Mason City	24/6	29/12	41/23	57/35	69/46	79/57	82/61	80/58	73/49	60/37	43/25	28/11
Sioux City	31/10	35/15	47/26	62/37	73/49	82/59	86/63	83/63	76/51	63/38	46/25	32/13

Climate data for Des Moines International Airport, Iowa (1991–2020 normals, (Note: Mean monthly maxima and minima (i.e. the expected highest and lowest temperature readings at any point during the year or given month) calculated based on data at said location from 1991 to 2020.) extremes 1878–present (Note: Official records for Des Moines kept August 1878 to August 1939 at downtown and at Des Moines International since September 1939. For more information, see Threadex))
Month	Jan	Feb	Mar	Apr	May	Jun	Jul	Aug	Sep	Oct	Nov	Dec	Year
Record high °F (°C)	67 (19)	78 (26)	91 (33)	93 (34)	105 (41)	103 (39)	110 (43)	110 (43)	101 (38)	95 (35)	82 (28)	74 (23)	110 (43)
Mean maximum °F (°C)	53.4 (11.9)	58.7 (14.8)	74.6 (23.7)	83.9 (28.8)	88.9 (31.6)	93.1 (33.9)	96.2 (35.7)	94.4 (34.7)	91.3 (32.9)	83.3 (28.5)	70.4 (21.3)	57.8 (14.3)	97.4 (36.3)
Mean daily maximum °F (°C)	30.9 (−0.6)	35.7 (2.1)	49.2 (9.6)	62.0 (16.7)	72.4 (22.4)	81.9 (27.7)	85.6 (29.8)	83.6 (28.7)	76.9 (24.9)	63.4 (17.4)	48.3 (9.1)	35.9 (2.2)	60.5 (15.8)
Daily mean °F (°C)	22.3 (−5.4)	26.9 (−2.8)	39.4 (4.1)	51.3 (10.7)	62.4 (16.9)	72.2 (22.3)	76.0 (24.4)	73.9 (23.3)	66.2 (19.0)	53.2 (11.8)	39.3 (4.1)	27.7 (−2.4)	50.9 (10.5)
Mean daily minimum °F (°C)	13.8 (−10.1)	18.0 (−7.8)	29.6 (−1.3)	40.6 (4.8)	52.3 (11.3)	62.4 (16.9)	66.4 (19.1)	64.2 (17.9)	55.4 (13.0)	42.9 (6.1)	30.2 (−1.0)	19.5 (−6.9)	41.3 (5.2)
Mean minimum °F (°C)	−7.8 (−22.1)	−2.7 (−19.3)	9.2 (−12.7)	24.9 (−3.9)	37.6 (3.1)	50.2 (10.1)	56.9 (13.8)	54.8 (12.7)	40.4 (4.7)	26.8 (−2.9)	12.6 (−10.8)	−1.2 (−18.4)	−11.4 (−24.1)
Record low °F (°C)	−30 (−34)	−26 (−32)	−22 (−30)	9 (−13)	26 (−3)	37 (3)	47 (8)	40 (4)	26 (−3)	7 (−14)	−10 (−23)	−22 (−30)	−30 (−34)
Average precipitation inches (mm)	1.08 (27)	1.34 (34)	2.17 (55)	4.02 (102)	5.24 (133)	5.26 (134)	3.82 (97)	4.17 (106)	3.18 (81)	2.78 (71)	1.91 (49)	1.58 (40)	36.55 (928)
Average snowfall inches (cm)	9.4 (24)	10.2 (26)	4.4 (11)	1.2 (3.0)	0.2 (0.51)	0.0 (0.0)	0.0 (0.0)	0.0 (0.0)	0.0 (0.0)	0.5 (1.3)	2.7 (6.9)	7.9 (20)	36.5 (93)
Average extreme snow depth inches (cm)	6.9 (18)	7.4 (19)	4.2 (11)	0.8 (2.0)	0.2 (0.51)	0.0 (0.0)	0.0 (0.0)	0.0 (0.0)	0.0 (0.0)	0.3 (0.76)	1.7 (4.3)	4.9 (12)	10.3 (26)
Average precipitation days (≥ 0.01 in)	8.2	8.4	9.5	11.5	12.7	11.7	9.5	9.4	8.2	8.6	7.7	7.8	113.2
Average snowy days (≥ 0.1 in)	6.9	6.3	3.1	1.0	0.1	0.0	0.0	0.0	0.0	0.5	1.8	5.6	25.3
Average relative humidity (%)	71.0	71.3	67.9	63.2	63.0	64.8	67.7	70.0	70.9	66.5	71.0	74.6	68.5
Mean monthly sunshine hours	157.7	163.3	206.0	222.2	276.0	312.1	337.8	297.9	239.8	210.0	138.5	129.2	2,690.4
Percentage possible sunshine	53	55	56	56	61	69	73	70	64	61	47	45	60
Average ultraviolet index	1	2	4	6	8	9	9	8	6	4	2	1	5
Source 1: NOAA (relative humidity and sun 1961−1990)
Source 2: Weather Atlas (UV)

== Water ==
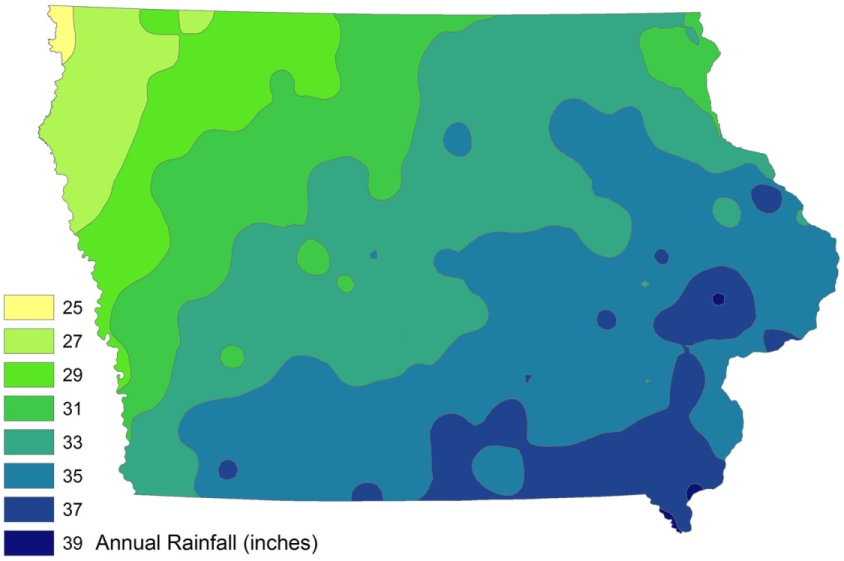
Iowa annual rainfall in inches

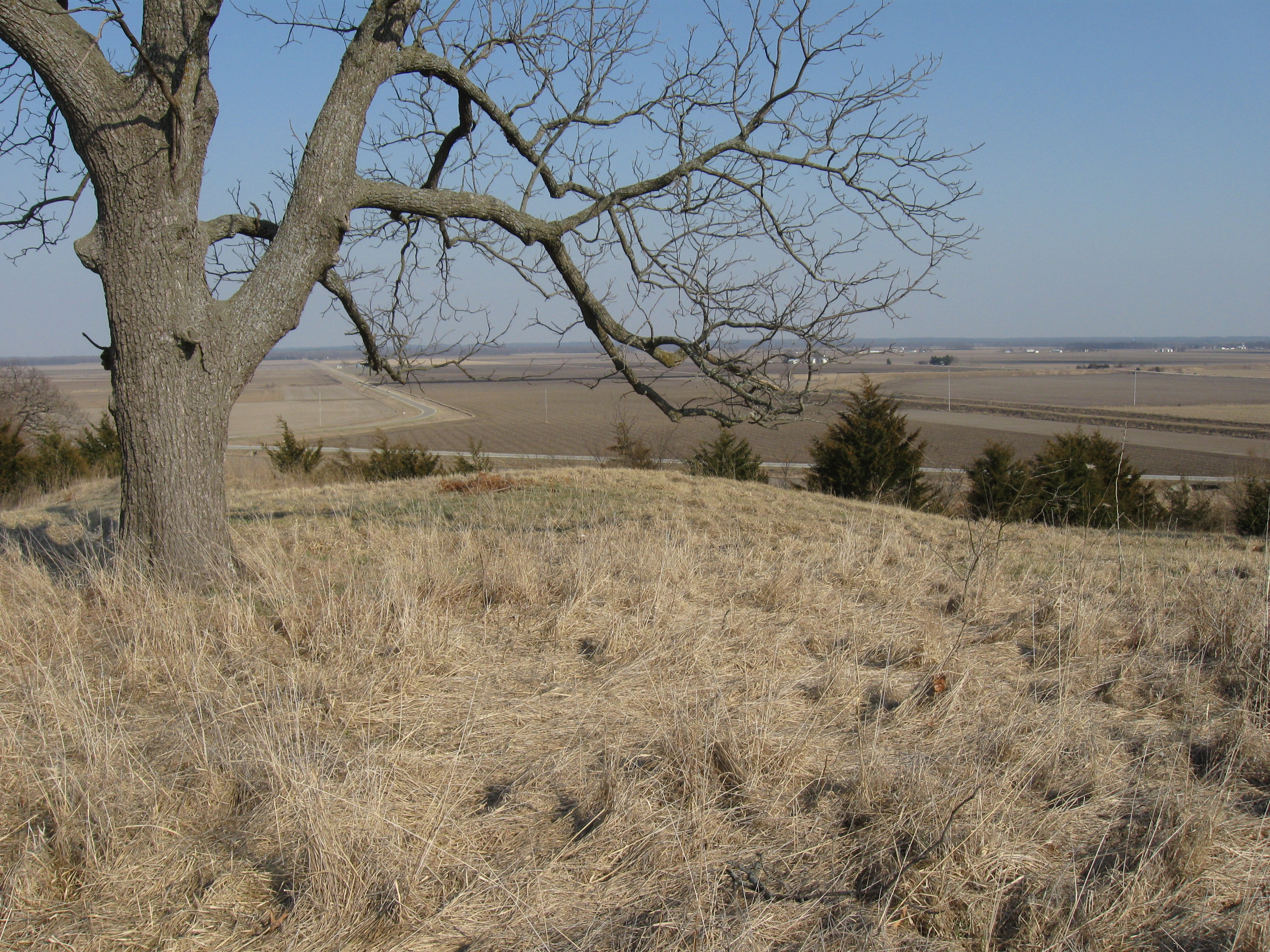
Mississippi River alluvial plain from SIDP bluffs north of Kingston, Iowa

As in most of the U.S., surface water in Iowa is never safe to drink untreated, contamination by agricultural runoff including nitrates, herbicides, pesticides, and animal waste is common, though the Clean Water Act has helped. Municipal water supplies are typically heavily chlorinated, this chlorine, combined with high nitrate levels, often give municipal water a strong smell, and the limestone bedrock in much of the state causes hard water. Some communities, such as Iowa City resort to additional carbon filtration and lime softening coagulation-sedimentation to make the water more palatable. Water treatment can be surprisingly effective; Des Moines' advanced filtration system has led to water quality ranked among the nation's best.

=== Jordan Aquifer ===
The Jordan Aquifer is the largest source of groundwater, extending from northeast Iowa to south central Iowa, and is ultimately the source of much of Iowa's agricultural and industrial water. In addition to pollution threats, the aquifer is threatened by overuse in well-source irrigation, ethanol production, and the diminishment of resupply caused by extensive field tilling. The aquifer has dropped by as much as 300 feet since the 19th century, resulting in dry wells, the disappearance of natural surface springs, and the diminishment of water quality.

== Soils ==
The NRCS divides Iowa into 23 soil regions. In general, soils of southern, eastern, and western Iowa are loess-derived, while soils of northern and central Iowa are till-derived. Most level areas of Iowa have soils highly suitable for agriculture, making Iowa one of the most productive farming regions of the world.

=== Radon ===
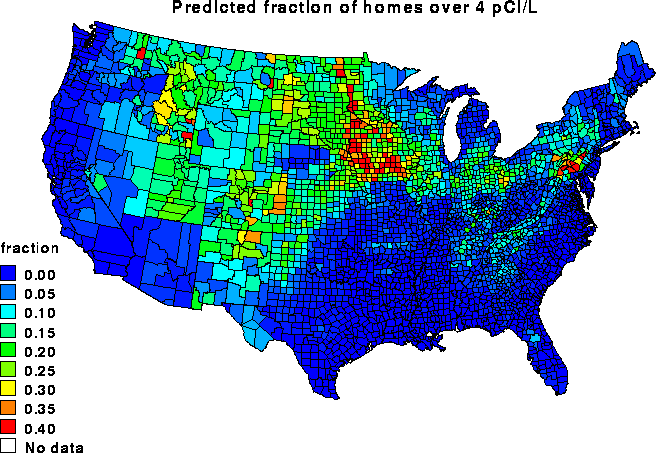
Radon levels in U.S., showing Iowa with some of the highest levels.

Like most Upper Midwest and Plains states, radon is a common problem in Iowa, especially in areas with clay-rich soils. Radon is the highest in the southern and the western parts of Iowa.

== Paleontology ==
=== Devonian Fossil Gorge ===
Floods in 1993 washed away all the soil and unconsolidated bedrock along the spillway of the Coralville Lake Dam in Johnson County, exposing a rich collection of Devonian-age fossils from species such as ancient Hexagonaria corals. This area has been transformed into a visitors' center, where hikers can tour the bedrock. Unfortunately, looters have illegally removed many of the better fossils. The June 2008 floods expanded the fossil bed floor, and removed some of the weathered overburden.

=== Dinosaurs ===
Jurassic and Cretaceous bedrock in western Iowa have potential to contain dinosaur remains, and in nearby parts of Nebraska Hadrosaurid (“duck-billed”) ornithopod dinosaur remains have been recovered in Cretaceous bedrock similar to that of Iowa. The deep loess that covers much of western Iowa typically conceals the bedrock, limiting opportunities to finding dinosaurs to mining and quarrying operations.

=== Paleofauna ===
Archaeological and paleontological sites in Iowa have produced an extensive collection of Pleistocene and Holocene animals; these have been used to reconstruct past environmental conditions in the Midwest. Some of the earliest paleoclimatic reconstructions of the midcontinent were made from Iowa collections, such as the Cherokee Sewer Site.

A Pleistocene giant sloth is under excavation along West Tarkio Creek near Shenandoah, Iowa. Three individuals of Megalonyx jeffersonii, or Jefferson's Ground Sloth, have been identified so far, including one adult and two juveniles of different ages.

== Notable Iowa geologists ==
Samuel Calvin (1840–1911) was Iowa's first systematic geologist, who helped to make the first bedrock and landform maps of Iowa, as well as lead geological research throughout the state. Calvin Hall at the University of Iowa is named for him. Clair Cameron Patterson (1922–1995) developed the lead-lead dating and calculated an age for the Earth of 4.55 billion years; a figure far more accurate than those that existed at the time and one that has remained unchanged for over 50 years. Charles Rollin Keyes was also an early Iowa geologist who helped map the soils and bedrock of southeast Iowa; he, with Calvin, was a founder of the Iowa Geological Survey.
