= Samuel Calvin (geologist) =

American geologist (1840–1911)

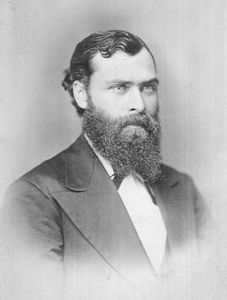
Samuel Calvin 1882

Samuel Calvin (February 2, 1840 – April 17, 1911) was Iowa's first systematic geologist, helping to make the first bedrock and landform maps of Iowa, as well as leading geological research throughout the state. He was born in Scotland, attended Lenox College (now defunct) in Hopkinton, Iowa, where he later taught. One of his collaborators was Thomas Huston Macbride, the notable Iowa naturalist. Calvin became a University of Iowa professor in 1873 and the Iowa State Geologist in 1892, and led the Iowa Geological Survey from 1892 until his death. Calvin documented the Devonian and Aftonian beds of Iowa, and was an expert on Pleistocene fauna. He was a founder of the American Geologist journal. Calvin Hall at the University of Iowa is named for him. His photographic collection of Iowa scenes is an important collection for historians and geologists. Calvin was president of the Geological Society of America in 1908.
