= Ola, South Dakota =

- Census-designated place
- Location within the state of South Dakota
- Coordinates: 43°36′02″N 99°12′41″W
- Country: United States
- State: South Dakota
- Counties: Brule

Area
  - Total: 4.02 sq mi (10.41 km^{2})
  - Land: 4.02 sq mi (10.41 km^{2})
  - Water: 0 sq mi (0.00 km^{2})
- Elevation: 1,732 ft (528 m)

Population (2020)
  - Total: 15
  - Density: 3.7/sq mi (1.44/km^{2})
- Time zone: UTC-6 (Central (CST))
  - Summer (DST): UTC-5 (CDT)
- FIPS code: 46-46700
- GNIS feature ID: 2584564

Ola is an unincorporated community and census-designated place in Brule County, South Dakota, United States. The population was 15 according to the 2020 census.

The CDP is located in southern Brule County, 2 miles (3 km) west of South Dakota Highway 50 and 12 miles (19 km) south of Interstate 90.

== Demographics ==
Historical population
Census	Pop.	Note	%±
2020	15		—
U.S. Decennial Census
