= Holy Trinity Church (Kimball, South Dakota) =

Historic church in South Dakota, United States

- U.S. National Register of Historic Places
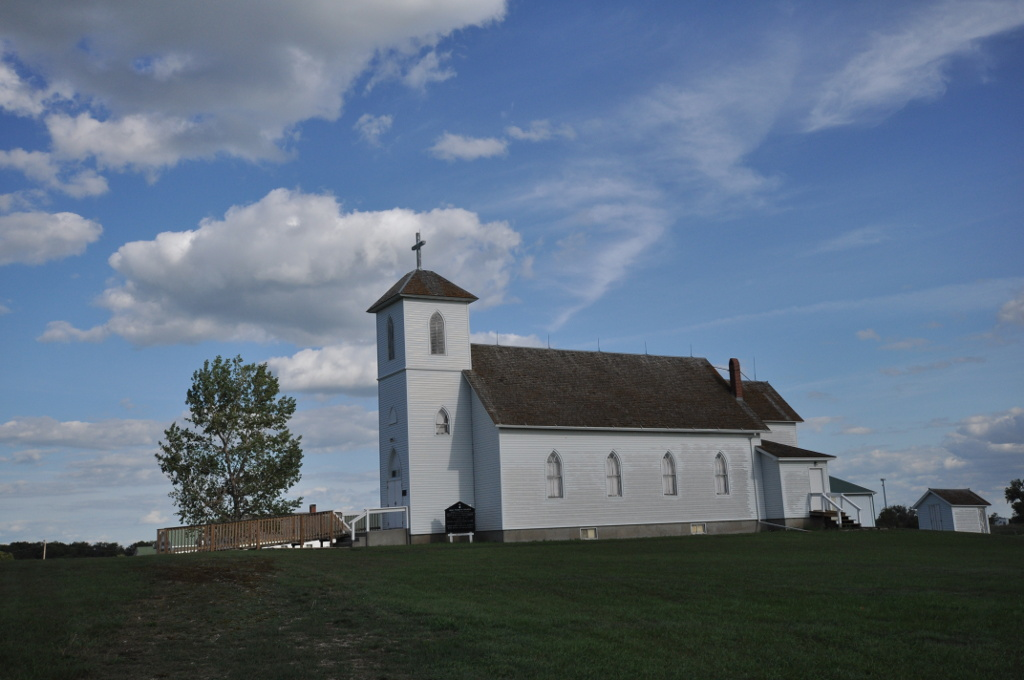

- Location within South Dakota Location within the United States
- Nearest city: Kimball, South Dakota
- Coordinates: 43°44′18″N 98°57′28″W
- Area: 1.5 acres (0.61 ha)
- Built: 1895
- Built by: Shereda, Fred
- NRHP reference No.: 83004205
- Added to NRHP: November 15, 1983

The Holy Trinity Church in Kimball, South Dakota, has also been known as the Church of the Blessed Trinity and as Bendon Church. It was built in the former town of Bendon, South Dakota, in 1895 and was added to the National Register of Historic Places in 1983.

The church was moved to Kimball after the Brule County Historical Society purchased the church to save it from being dismantled for its lumber.

It was deemed "an important example of Bohemian vernacular religious architecture in South Dakota as well as a visual survivor of Czech settlement history and the town of Bendon."
