= Lost Island Lake =

Lake in Iowa, United States

- Location within Iowa Location within the United States
- Location: Palo Alto / Clay counties, Iowa, United States
- Coordinates: 43°10′20″N 094°54′19″W
- Basin countries: United States
- Surface area: 1,162 acres (470 ha)
- Max. depth: 16 ft (4.9 m)
- Surface elevation: 1,348 ft (411 m)

Lost Island Lake is a 1,200-acre (4.9 km^{2}) lake north of Ruthven, Iowa, United States.
