= Cottonwood Slough-Dry Run =

Wetland in the state of South Dakota, United States

Cottonwood Slough- Dry Run
- Location within South Dakota Location within the United States
- Location: Lake County, South Dakota
- Coordinates: 44.9571°N 97.1935°W
- Basin countries: United States
- Surface area: 6,424 acres (26.00 km^{2})

U.S. National Natural Landmark
- Designated: 1975

Cottonwood Slough-Dry Run is a glacial wetland adjacent to Lake Kampeska in Roberts County, South Dakota, United States. The complex is located near Watertown in eastern South Dakota. Owned by the State of South Dakota and the private sector, the wetland was listed as a National Natural Landmark in 1975.

== Description ==
The National Park Service describes Cottonwood Slough-Dry Run as follows:

A completely undisturbed wetland complex including potholes, streams, shallow open water, lakes, and marsh.

Pleistocene glaciers created a morphologically diverse wetland formation. A wide variety of plants and animals can live within the 6,424-acre wetland parcel that has been granted Landmark designation.
