= Edward Morrison House =

- U.S. National Register of Historic Places
- Location within South Dakota Location within the United States
- Location: 624 Main St., Pukwana, South Dakota
- Coordinates: 43°46′37″N 99°10′52″W
- Area: less than one acre
- Built: 1928
- Built by: Morrison, Edward
- Architectural style: Bungalow/craftsman
- NRHP reference No.: 05000945
- Added to NRHP: August 30, 2005

The Edward Morrison House, at 624 Main St. in Pukwana, South Dakota, was built in 1928. It was listed on the National Register of Historic Places in 2005.

It was deemed to be a " a good example of the side gabled roof subtype of the Bungalow/Craftsman style of architecture in South Dakota."

It was built by Edward Morrison.

A second contributing building on the property is a garage with an attached cob house shed.
