= The Castles (South Dakota) =

National Natural Landmark in South Dakota

- Interactive map of The Castles
- Location: Slim Buttes land unit, Custer National Forest, Harding County, South Dakota, United States
- Coordinates: 45.527583°N 103.170965°W
- Established: National Natural Landmark

U.S. National Natural Landmark
- Designated: 1976

The Castles is a butte formation in Harding County, South Dakota, United States. It is a place of geological and historical interest, being located adjacent to the site of the Battle of Slim Buttes. A 940-acre portion of this site was listed in 1976 as a National Natural Landmark as a volcanic ash deposit that stands substantially higher than the surrounding plateau. The site is located within the Slim Buttes land parcel of the Custer National Forest, a federal landholding.

== Description ==
The United States Forest Service describes The Castles:

A massive sandstone remnant which originated as a volcanic ash deposit and resemble[s] a medieval castle.

The Castles is described by the National Park Service as a place of steep-walled, flat-topped buttes that stand 200 feet to 400 feet (100m) above the surrounding prairie. The sandstones of the buttes are described as including strata from the Upper Cretaceous, Paleocene, Oligocene, and Miocene time units. The Castles is described by the Forest Service as a habitat for one of North America's largest populations of Merlin falcons.
