= Prairie Pothole Region =

Geographic area in North America

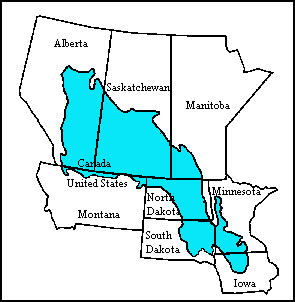
Map of the Prairie Pothole Region of North America (U.S. Geological Survey, Northern Prairie Wildlife Research Center)

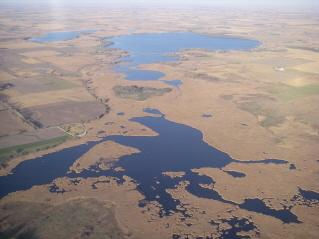
Barringer Slough in Iowa, a remnant of the extensive prairie wetlands that once covered the region.

The Prairie Pothole Region (PPR) is an expansive area of the northern Great Plains that contains thousands of shallow wetlands known as potholes. These potholes are the result of glacier activity in the Wisconsin glaciation, which ended about 10,000 years ago. The decaying ice sheet left behind depressions formed by the uneven deposition of till as buried ice blocks melted in ground moraines. These depressions are called potholes, glacial potholes, kettles, or kettle lakes. They fill with water in the spring primarily from winter snowmelt, creating wetlands, which range in duration from temporary to semi-permanent. The region covers an area of about 800,000 sq. km and expands across three Canadian provinces (Saskatchewan, Manitoba, and Alberta) and five U.S. states (Minnesota, Iowa, North and South Dakota, and Montana). The hydrology of the wetlands is variable, which results in long term productivity and biodiversity. The PPR is a prime spot during breeding and nesting season for millions of migrating waterfowl.

== Hydrology ==
Few natural surface water drainage systems occur in the region as pothole wetlands are not connected by surface streams. They receive most of their water from spring snowmelt and precipitation. Some pothole wetlands also receive groundwater inflow, so they typically last longer each year than those that only receive water from precipitation. Shorter-duration wetlands fed only by precipitation typically are sources of groundwater recharge. The hydrology of the potholes is very variable, responding to changes in precipitation and groundwater, and results in regular wet-and-dry cycles.

== Vegetation ==
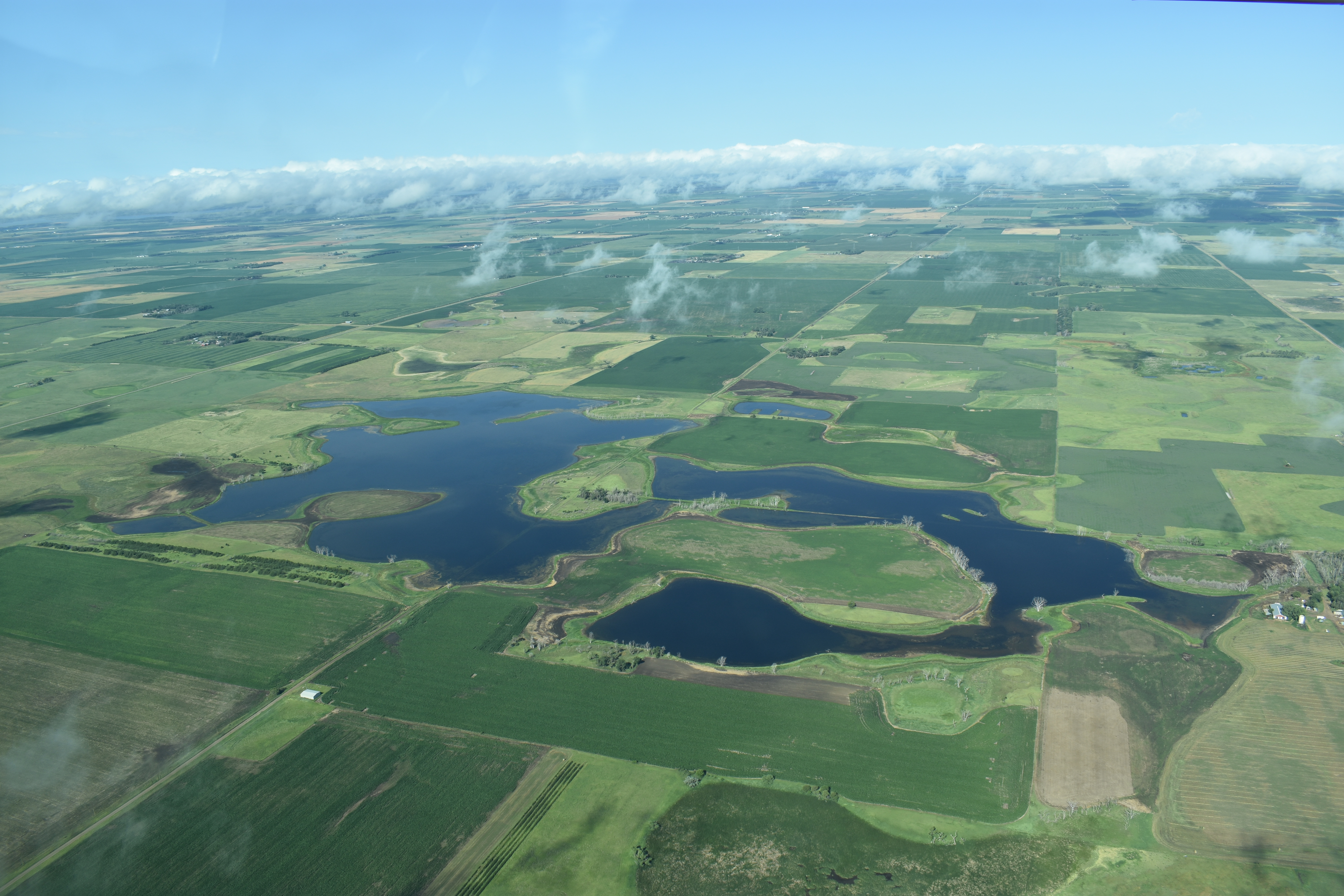
Prairie Pothole wetlands in South Dakota

The vegetation of the PPR consists of emergent plants and tall grasses, while the prairie surrounding the region has dense grassland vegetation. The composition of a local plant community is heavily affected by the amount of water available. In wetter wetlands that retain water through the summer, the common plant is hard-stem bulrush, along with soft-stem bulrush and common threesquare in slightly drier regions of the wetlands. The vegetation in permanently flooded wetlands is more aquatic; duckweeds, pondweeds, aquatic buttercups, and aquatic smartweeds are some of the most common. In drier wetlands of the PPR, the vegetation varies from spikerush, which is found in the wetter areas of the wetland, to foxtail barley and wheatgrass on the outer edges of the wetland. The variable availability of water in the Prairie Pothole Region is buffered by an abundant seed bank under the soil, comprising species that thrive under different water regimes. During times of drought, shortgrass species increase and expand their range, while during wetter periods, tallgrass and mixed prairie communities become more common.

== Wildlife ==
The Prairie Pothole Region provides important habitats for migratory waterfowl and other wildlife, supporting more than 50% of North America's migratory waterfowl. In particular, the region is one of North America's most important breeding areas for ducks. Although the region contains only about one-tenth of the continent's habitat area for breeding of waterfowl, roughly half the primary species of game ducks on the continent breed there. The region accounts for more than 60% of the breeding populations of mallard, gadwall, blue-winged teal, northern shoveler, northern pintail, redhead, and canvasback ducks. In a typical year, the PPR can sustain 10 million ducks, with high-precipitation years reaching 14 million. The PPR also provides quality habitat for breeding and migration stopover for 36 of the 50 common shorebirds found in the country.

== Threats ==
Conversion of land for agriculture is a significant factor in the loss of wetlands in the PPR. More than half of the wetlands have been drained for farming. In particular, 90% of the prairie wetlands of the Minnesota River basin have been lost as habitat. The wetlands that do persist, surrounded as they are by agricultural lands, are also affected. Chemical runoff, sedimentation, and nutrient flow into the wetlands have adverse impacts. Farming practices are a major conflict with the PPR as recent studies show that some parts of the region have suffered up to 70% losses to native habitat, though most portions see 30%-40% losses to the native habitat. These numbers are expected to rise due to an increased demand for agricultural products.

Climate change is an adverse factor in the long-term viability of PPR wetlands for breeding ducks and other birds. Without mitigation, severe droughts and rising temperatures will cause many pothole wetlands to dry up sooner in the spring. In turn, due to the timing of waterfowl migrations, these dried wetlands will not present suitable breeding habitat. Warming-related drought may affect as much as 90 percent of the PPR's remaining wetlands. Simulations suggest that climate change will shift the most productive wetlands from the center of the region (southeastern Saskatchewan and the Dakotas) to edges of the PPR in the east and north. However, research has suggested that the effect of global warming is overshadowed by that of intensified land use and drainage of wetlands.

== See also ==
- Geography of Alberta
- Geography of Saskatchewan
- Geography of Manitoba
- Geography of Montana
- Geography of North Dakota
- Geography of South Dakota
- Geography of Minnesota
- Geography of Iowa
