= Pukwana, South Dakota =

- Town
- Location in Brule County and the state of South Dakota
- Coordinates: 43°46′45″N 99°11′03″W
- Country: United States
- State: South Dakota
- County: Brule
- Founded: 1881

Area
  - Total: 0.77 sq mi (1.99 km^{2})
  - Land: 0.77 sq mi (1.99 km^{2})
  - Water: 0 sq mi (0.00 km^{2})
- Elevation: 1,565 ft (477 m)

Population (2020)
  - Total: 233
  - Density: 303.9/sq mi (117.34/km^{2})
- Time zone: UTC-6 (Central (CST))
  - Summer (DST): UTC-5 (CDT)
- ZIP code: 57370
- Area code: 605
- FIPS code: 46-52220
- GNIS feature ID: 1267539

Pukwana is a town in Brule County, South Dakota, United States. The population was 233 at the 2020 census.

Pukwana was laid out in 1881.

In 1955, the local residents made a push to get the new Brule County Courthouse relocated to town, however the city of Chamberlain managed to keep it after battling petitions were made.

== Geography ==
According to the United States Census Bureau, the town has a total area of 0.76 square miles (1.97 km^{2}), all land. The population center is close to Red Lake, a prairie pothole that is listed as a National Natural Landmark.

== Demographics ==
Historical population
Census	Pop.	Note	%±
1910	164		—
1920	192		17.1%
1930	307		59.9%
1940	258		−16.0%
1950	302		17.1%
1960	247		−18.2%
1970	208		−15.8%
1980	234		12.5%
1990	263		12.4%
2000	287		9.1%
2010	285		−0.7%
2020	233		−18.2%
U.S. Decennial Census

=== 2010 census ===
As of the census of 2010, there were 285 people, 115 households, and 70 families residing in the town. The population density was 375.0 inhabitants per square mile (144.8/km^{2}). There were 133 housing units at an average density of 175.0 per square mile (67.6/km^{2}). The racial makeup of the town was 79.6% White, 10.9% Native American, 0.7% Asian, 0.4% from other races, and 8.4% from two or more races. Hispanic or Latino of any race were 4.2% of the population.

There were 115 households, of which 29.6% had children under the age of 18 living with them, 47.8% were married couples living together, 7.8% had a female householder with no husband present, 5.2% had a male householder with no wife present, and 39.1% were non-families. 29.6% of all households were made up of individuals, and 7% had someone living alone who was 65 years of age or older. The average household size was 2.48 and the average family size was 3.19.

The median age in the town was 41.5 years. 26% of residents were under the age of 18; 7% were between the ages of 18 and 24; 21.1% were from 25 to 44; 32% were from 45 to 64; and 14% were 65 years of age or older. The gender makeup of the town was 50.2% male and 49.8% female.

=== 2000 census ===
As of the census of 2000, there were 287 people, 116 households, and 78 families residing in the town. The population density was 369.6 inhabitants per square mile (142.7/km^{2}). There were 131 housing units at an average density of 168.7 per square mile (65.1/km^{2}). The racial makeup of the town was 97.21% White, 2.44% Native American, and 0.35% from two or more races. Hispanic or Latino of any race were 0.70% of the population.

There were 116 households, out of which 31.0% had children under the age of 18 living with them, 53.4% were married couples living together, 10.3% had a female householder with no husband present, and 31.9% were non-families. 29.3% of all households were made up of individuals, and 11.2% had someone living alone who was 65 years of age or older. The average household size was 2.47 and the average family size was 3.10.

In the town, the population was spread out, with 28.9% under the age of 18, 7.7% from 18 to 24, 29.6% from 25 to 44, 22.6% from 45 to 64, and 11.1% who were 65 years of age or older. The median age was 36 years. For every 100 females, there were 102.1 males. For every 100 females age 18 and over, there were 96.2 males.

As of 2000 the median income for a household in the town was $27,500, and the median income for a family was $31,667. Males had a median income of $24,375 versus $15,208 for females. The per capita income for the town was $11,978. About 5.6% of families and 12.1% of the population were below the poverty line, including 17.5% of those under the age of eighteen and 9.4% of those 65 or over.

== Climate ==
This climatic region is typified by large seasonal temperature differences, with warm to hot (and often humid) summers and cold (sometimes severely cold) winters. According to the Köppen Climate Classification system, Pukwana has a humid continental climate, abbreviated "Dfa" on climate maps.

Climate data for Pukwana, South Dakota
Month	Jan	Feb	Mar	Apr	May	Jun	Jul	Aug	Sep	Oct	Nov	Dec	Year
Mean daily maximum °C (°F)	−1 (30)	2 (35)	7 (45)	17 (62)	23 (73)	28 (82)	33 (92)	32 (89)	27 (80)	19 (67)	8 (47)	1 (34)	16 (61)
Mean daily minimum °C (°F)	−15 (5)	−12 (11)	−6 (21)	1 (34)	7 (45)	13 (56)	16 (61)	15 (59)	9 (49)	2 (36)	−6 (22)	−12 (11)	1 (34)
Average precipitation mm (inches)	7.6 (0.3)	13 (0.5)	23 (0.9)	41 (1.6)	66 (2.6)	91 (3.6)	53 (2.1)	51 (2)	38 (1.5)	25 (1)	15 (0.6)	7.6 (0.3)	440 (17.2)
Source: Weatherbase
