= Bijou Hills, South Dakota =

Bijou Hills, South Dakota Wíyukeze Pahá
- Census-designated place
- Location within the state of South Dakota
- Coordinates: 43°31′43″N 99°08′38″W
- Country: United States
- State: South Dakota
- Counties: Brule

Area
  - Total: 5.25 sq mi (13.60 km^{2})
  - Land: 5.25 sq mi (13.60 km^{2})
  - Water: 0 sq mi (0.00 km^{2})
- Elevation: 1,811 ft (552 m)

Population (2020)
  - Total: 2
  - Density: 0.39/sq mi (0.15/km^{2})
- Time zone: UTC-6 (Central (CST))
  - Summer (DST): UTC-5 (CDT)
- FIPS code: 46-05580
- GNIS feature ID: 2584546

Bijou Hills (Lakota: Wíyukeze Pahá) is an unincorporated community and census-designated place in Brule County, South Dakota, United States. As of 2020 census, The population was 2, down from 6 in 2010.

The CDP is located in southern Brule County, at the south base of a small ridge known as the Bijou Hills. The community is 1.2 miles (1.9 km) northeast of South Dakota Highway 50 and 18 miles (29 km) south of Interstate 90.

== History ==
Bijou Hills was laid out in 1875, and named after a nearby group of hills. A post office called Bijou Hills was established in 1877, and remained in operation until 1957.

In 1976, Bijou Hills was designated as a National Natural Landmark by the National Park Service.

== Demographics ==
Historical population
Census	Pop.	Note	%±
2010	6		—
2020	2		−66.7%
U.S. Decennial Census
