= Kimball, South Dakota =

- City
- Seal

- Location in Brule County and the state of South Dakota
- Coordinates: 43°44′49″N 98°57′24″W
- Country: United States
- State: South Dakota
- County: Brule
- Incorporated: 1889

Area
  - Total: 3.44 sq mi (8.90 km^{2})
  - Land: 3.44 sq mi (8.90 km^{2})
  - Water: 0 sq mi (0.00 km^{2})
- Elevation: 1,791 ft (546 m)

Population (2020)
  - Total: 572
  - Density: 166.4/sq mi (64.26/km^{2})
- Time zone: UTC-6 (Central (CST))
  - Summer (DST): UTC-5 (CDT)
- ZIP code: 57355
- Area code: 605
- FIPS code: 46-33980
- GNIS feature ID: 1267445
- Website: cityofkimballsodak.org

Kimball is a city in Brule County, South Dakota, United States. The population was 572 at the 2020 census.

== History ==
Kimball was first known as Stake 48 on the Chicago, Milwaukee and St. Paul Railroad line going west out of Mitchell. In 1880, the first homestead claims were made in the vicinity of Stake 48. Kimball was organized as a village in the spring of 1883. The town was named for J. W. Kimball, a railroad surveyor.

The 1895 Holy Trinity Church is on the National Register of Historic Places.

The two major fires that hit Kimball, South Dakota, were significant events in the town's history, both causing extensive damage to its downtown area.

The first fire occurred in 1890. At that time, the town's buildings were primarily made of wood, which made them highly susceptible to fire. The cause of this fire isn't well-documented, but it's likely that an accident involving a stove, chimney, or open flame—common sources of fire in those days—started the blaze. Due to the lack of a fully developed firefighting infrastructure, the fire spread quickly, destroying many businesses and homes in the heart of Kimball's downtown area. This fire caused significant economic damage, but the town began to rebuild afterward.

The second fire struck in 1905 and, like the first, caused widespread destruction to the downtown area. Many of the buildings that were rebuilt after the 1890 fire were damaged or destroyed once again. This fire reinforced the need for better fire safety measures, and after this second incident, more buildings were constructed using fire-resistant materials like brick and stone, which helped reduce the risk of future fires.

== Geography ==
Kimball is located just north of Interstate 90 at exit 284, the southern terminus of South Dakota Highway 45.

According to the United States Census Bureau, the city has a total area of 3.09 square miles (8.00 km^{2}), all land.

== Demographics ==
Historical population
Census	Pop.	Note	%±
1890	593		—
1900	453		−23.6%
1910	713		57.4%
1920	993		39.3%
1930	1,111		11.9%
1940	997		−10.3%
1950	952		−4.5%
1960	912		−4.2%
1970	825		−9.5%
1980	752		−8.8%
1990	743		−1.2%
2000	745		0.3%
2010	703		−5.6%
2020	572		−18.6%
U.S. Decennial Census

=== 2020 census ===
As of the 2020 census, Kimball had a population of 572, and the median age was 45.0 years; 22.7% of residents were under the age of 18 and 22.2% were 65 years of age or older. For every 100 females there were 97.9 males, and for every 100 females age 18 and over there were 99.1 males age 18 and over.

0.0% of residents lived in urban areas, while 100.0% lived in rural areas.

There were 261 households in Kimball, of which 21.1% had children under the age of 18 living in them. Of all households, 44.1% were married-couple households, 24.5% were households with a male householder and no spouse or partner present, and 28.4% were households with a female householder and no spouse or partner present. About 41.8% of all households were made up of individuals, and 15.7% had someone living alone who was 65 years of age or older.

There were 309 housing units, of which 15.5% were vacant. The homeowner vacancy rate was 1.5% and the rental vacancy rate was 4.8%.

Racial composition as of the 2020 census
Race	Number	Percent
White	538	94.1%
Black or African American	0	0.0%
American Indian and Alaska Native	10	1.7%
Asian	0	0.0%
Native Hawaiian and Other Pacific Islander	0	0.0%
Some other race	1	0.2%
Two or more races	23	4.0%
Hispanic or Latino (of any race)	4	0.7%

=== 2010 census ===
At the 2010 census there were 703 people in 310 households, including 189 families, in the city. The population density was 227.5 inhabitants per square mile (87.8/km^{2}). There were 369 housing units at an average density of 119.4 per square mile (46.1/km^{2}). The racial makeup of the city was 95.0% White, 0.3% African American, 3.3% Native American, 0.3% Asian, 0.4% from other races, and 0.7% from two or more races. Hispanic or Latino of any race were 1.1%.

Of the 310 households 29.4% had children under the age of 18 living with them, 46.5% were married couples living together, 8.7% had a female householder with no husband present, 5.8% had a male householder with no wife present, and 39.0% were non-families. 35.2% of households were one person and 21.6% were one person aged 65 or older. The average household size was 2.26 and the average family size was 2.93.

The median age was 43 years. 26.6% of residents were under the age of 18; 5.4% were between the ages of 18 and 24; 21.7% were from 25 to 44; 27.2% were from 45 to 64; and 19.2% were 65 or older. The gender makeup of the city was 48.2% male and 51.8% female.

=== 2000 census ===
At the 2000 census there were 745 people in 314 households, including 194 families, in the city. The population density was 240.7 inhabitants per square mile (92.9/km^{2}). There were 351 housing units at an average density of 113.4 per square mile (43.8/km^{2}). The racial makeup of the city was 99.33% White, 0.54% Native American, and 0.13% from two or more races.

Of the 314 households 29.9% had children under the age of 18 living with them, 52.2% were married couples living together, 6.4% had a female householder with no husband present, and 37.9% were non-families. 35.4% of households were one person and 19.7% were one person aged 65 or older. The average household size was 2.37 and the average family size was 3.11.

The age distribution was 27.9% under the age of 18, 6.4% from 18 to 24, 24.8% from 25 to 44, 17.9% from 45 to 64, and 23.0% 65 or older. The median age was 40 years. For every 100 females, there were 88.1 males. For every 100 females age 18 and over, there were 86.5 males.

As of 2000 the median income for a household in the city was $32,167, and the median family income was $37,813. Males had a median income of $27,727 versus $16,544 for females. The per capita income for the city was $15,398. About 5.9% of families and 10.9% of the population were below the poverty line, including 11.8% of those under age 18 and 16.7% of those age 65 or over.

== Notable person ==
Alton Ochsner - Dr. Ochsner was born in Kimball and graduated from Kimball High School. He was "a world renowned surgeon and founder of the Ochsner Clinic and Hospital in New Orleans. Dr. Ochsner is credited with convincing the medical world of the connection between cigarette smoking and lung cancer and heart disease. A cartoonist used his crusade as a subject for one of his drawings.

== See also ==
- List of cities in South Dakota
