= Brule County, South Dakota =

County in South Dakota, United States

- County
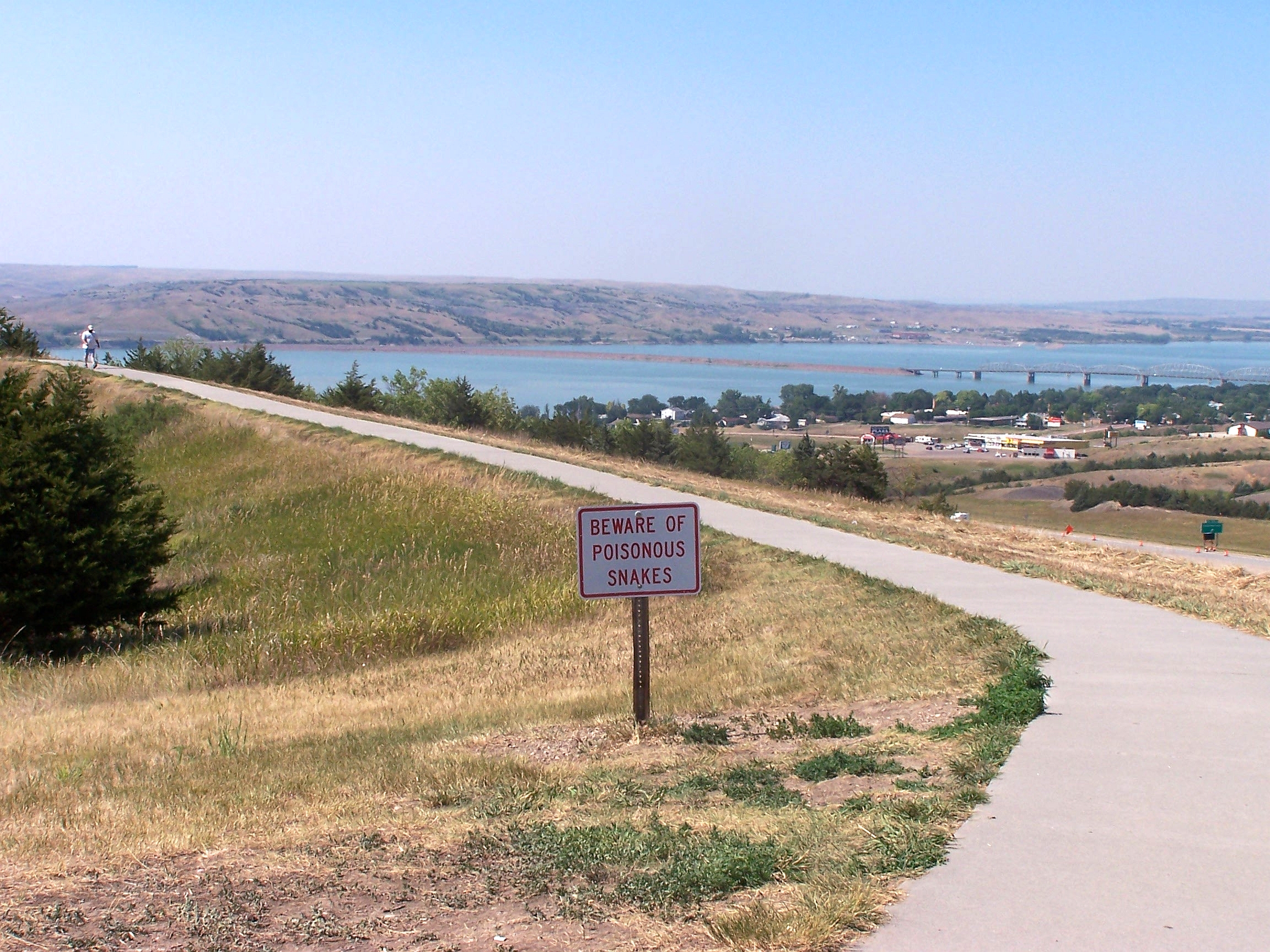
- Chamberlain, South Dakota and the Missouri River

- Location within the U.S. state of South Dakota
- Coordinates: 43°43′N 99°04′W
- Country: United States
- State: South Dakota
- Created: 1875
- Organized: 1879
- Named for: Brulé subtribe of Lakota people
- Seat: Chamberlain
- Largest city: Chamberlain

Area
  - Total: 846 sq mi (2,190 km^{2})
  - Land: 817 sq mi (2,120 km^{2})
  - Water: 29 sq mi (75 km^{2}) 3.5%

Population (2020)
  - Total: 5,247
  - Estimate (2025): 5,278 ▲
  - Density: 6.5/sq mi (2.5/km^{2})
- Time zone: UTC−6 (Central)
  - Summer (DST): UTC−5 (CDT)
- Congressional district: At-large
- Website: www.brulecounty.gov

Brule County is a county in the U.S. state of South Dakota. As of the 2020 census, the population was 5,247. Its county seat is Chamberlain.

== History ==
Brule County was created on January 14, 1875, of territory partitioned from Charles Mix County. Its governing structure was also created at that time. However, in May 1875, Brule County was withdrawn from settlement, by order of US President Grant. This order was later annulled, and the organization of Brule County governing structure was completed in September 1879.

On March 9, 1883, the area of Brule County was slightly increased by an addition of former Buffalo County lands. The total area of Brule County was further increased on June 4, 1891, when American Island (in the Missouri River) was attached to the county (from the Sioux Reservation). Its boundaries have remained unchanged since that date.

== Geography ==
The Missouri River flows southward along the western boundary line of Brule County. The county terrain consists of rolling hills, partially dedicated to agriculture. The county has a total area of 846 square miles (2,190 km^{2}), of which 817 square miles (2,120 km^{2}) is land and 29 square miles (75 km^{2}) (3.5%) is water.

=== Major highways ===
- Interstate 90
- South Dakota Highway 45
- South Dakota Highway 50

=== Adjacent counties ===
- Buffalo County – north
- Jerauld County – northeast
- Aurora County – east
- Charles Mix County – south
- Lyman County – west

=== Protected areas ===
- Boyer State Game Production Area
- Brule Bottom State Game Production Area
- Burning Brule State Game Production Area
- Chain lake State Game Production Area
- Chamberlain State Game Production Area
- Elm Creek State Game Production Area
- Elm Creek State Lakeside Use Area
- Hoover State Game Production Area
- Kimball State Game Production Area
- Lake Sixteen State Game Production Area

=== Lakes ===
- America Lake
- Lake Francis Case (part)
- Red Lake

== Demographics ==
Historical population
Census	Pop.	Note	%±
1880	238		—
1890	6,737		2,730.7%
1900	5,401		−19.8%
1910	6,451		19.4%
1920	7,141		10.7%
1930	7,416		3.9%
1940	6,195		−16.5%
1950	6,076		−1.9%
1960	6,319		4.0%
1970	5,870		−7.1%
1980	5,245		−10.6%
1990	5,485		4.6%
2000	5,364		−2.2%
2010	5,255		−2.0%
2020	5,247		−0.2%
2025 (est.)	5,278	▲	0.6%
U.S. Decennial Census

=== 2020 census ===
As of the 2020 census, there were 5,247 people, 2,024 households, and 1,271 families residing in the county, giving a population density of 6.4 inhabitants per square mile (2.5/km^{2}).

Of the residents, 23.5% were under the age of 18 and 21.5% were 65 years of age or older; the median age was 43.3 years. For every 100 females there were 98.4 males, and for every 100 females age 18 and over there were 96.6 males. The racial makeup of the county was 83.2% White, 0.6% Black or African American, 9.9% American Indian and Alaska Native, 0.5% Asian, 0.4% from some other race, and 5.4% from two or more races. Hispanic or Latino residents of any race comprised 2.0% of the population.

Of the 2,024 households, 30.1% had children under the age of 18 living with them and 25.1% had a female householder with no spouse or partner present. About 31.2% of all households were made up of individuals and 13.4% had someone living alone who was 65 years of age or older.

There were 2,344 housing units, of which 13.7% were vacant. Among occupied housing units, 68.7% were owner-occupied and 31.3% were renter-occupied. The homeowner vacancy rate was 1.1% and the rental vacancy rate was 7.6%.

=== 2010 census ===
As of the 2010 census, there were 5,255 people, 2,136 households, and 1,375 families in the county. The population density was 6.4 inhabitants per square mile (2.5/km^{2}). There were 2,433 housing units at an average density of 3.0 units per square mile (1.2 units/km^{2}). The racial makeup of the county was 88.4% white, 8.5% American Indian, 0.2% black or African American, 0.2% Asian, 0.3% from other races, and 2.4% from two or more races. Those of Hispanic or Latino origin made up 1.4% of the population. In terms of ancestry, 51.7% were German, 11.7% were Irish, 11.5% were Czech, 10.9% were Norwegian, 6.2% were English, and 1.3% were American.

Of the 2,136 households, 30.3% had children under the age of 18 living with them, 52.0% were married couples living together, 8.6% had a female householder with no husband present, 35.6% were non-families, and 30.5% of all households were made up of individuals. The average household size was 2.40 and the average family size was 3.03. The median age was 41.3 years.

The median income for a household in the county was $48,277 and the median income for a family was $58,363. Males had a median income of $33,958 versus $25,051 for females. The per capita income for the county was $19,779. About 9.8% of families and 9.1% of the population were below the poverty line, including 9.0% of those under age 18 and 10.6% of those age 65 or over.

== Communities ==
=== Cities ===
- Chamberlain (county seat)
- Kimball

=== Town ===
- Pukwana

=== Census-designated places ===
- Bijou Hills
- Cedar Grove Colony
- Grass Ranch Colony
- Ola

=== Unincorporated community ===
- Grandview

=== Townships ===
- America
- Brule
- Chamberlain
- Cleveland
- Eagle
- Highland
- Kimball
- Lyon
- Ola
- Plainfield
- Pleasant Grove
- Plummer
- Pukwana
- Red Lake
- Richland
- Smith
- Torrey Lake
- Waldro
- West Point
- Wilbur
- Willow Lake
- Union

== Politics ==
For the first century of South Dakota statehood, the predominately white voters of Brule County favored the Democratic Party. The county favored a Republican presidential candidate on just three occasions between 1896 and 1976. In the national landslide victories of Theodore Roosevelt, Harding and Dwight D. Eisenhower, when each candidate swept every other county in South Dakota, none obtained more than 53.1 percent of Brule County's vote. Richard Nixon, running against favorite son George McGovern in 1972, did not gain 46 percent in Brule County, while he was sweeping all but 129 other counties nationwide.

Since the "Reagan Revolution", voters in Brule County have shifted to favor Republican presidential candidates. Michael Dukakis in 1988 was the last Democrat to win a majority in Brule County, although Bill Clinton twice obtained a plurality. Four of the past five Republican nominees have won over 58 percent of Brule County's vote.

United States presidential election results for Brule County, South Dakota
Year	Republican		Democratic		Third party(ies)	
Year	No.	%	No.	%	No.	%
1892	538	44.03%	200	16.37%	484	39.61%
1896	441	39.59%	668	59.96%	5	0.45%
1900	644	47.14%	716	52.42%	6	0.44%
1904	693	51.60%	608	45.27%	42	3.13%
1908	753	46.80%	823	51.15%	33	2.05%
1912	0	0.00%	842	53.63%	728	46.37%
1916	729	41.66%	975	55.71%	46	2.63%
1920	1,036	51.03%	671	33.05%	323	15.91%
1924	1,060	37.11%	650	22.76%	1,146	40.13%
1928	1,431	46.46%	1,599	51.92%	50	1.62%
1932	797	24.04%	2,465	74.36%	53	1.60%
1936	982	29.61%	2,274	68.56%	61	1.84%
1940	1,352	42.42%	1,835	57.58%	0	0.00%
1944	1,002	41.51%	1,412	58.49%	0	0.00%
1948	1,056	38.48%	1,646	59.99%	42	1.53%
1952	1,578	53.13%	1,392	46.87%	0	0.00%
1956	1,317	41.02%	1,894	58.98%	0	0.00%
1960	1,403	46.72%	1,600	53.28%	0	0.00%
1964	968	30.51%	2,205	69.49%	0	0.00%
1968	1,237	43.94%	1,425	50.62%	153	5.44%
1972	1,421	45.88%	1,665	53.76%	11	0.36%
1976	1,175	43.15%	1,534	56.33%	14	0.51%
1980	1,674	59.79%	925	33.04%	201	7.18%
1984	1,578	61.74%	961	37.60%	17	0.67%
1988	971	49.19%	991	50.20%	12	0.61%
1992	908	33.93%	1,060	39.61%	708	26.46%
1996	981	40.81%	1,091	45.38%	332	13.81%
2000	1,268	58.51%	818	37.75%	81	3.74%
2004	1,544	58.73%	1,040	39.56%	45	1.71%
2008	1,407	57.69%	965	39.57%	67	2.75%
2012	1,499	63.01%	824	34.64%	56	2.35%
2016	1,565	68.40%	571	24.96%	152	6.64%
2020	1,750	70.28%	673	27.03%	67	2.69%
2024	1,694	69.91%	666	27.49%	63	2.60%

== See also ==
- National Register of Historic Places listings in Brule County, South Dakota
