= Ipswich Baptist Church =

Historic church in South Dakota, United States

- U.S. National Register of Historic Places
- Location within South Dakota Location within the United States
- Location: Main St. and 3rd Ave., Ipswich, South Dakota
- Coordinates: 45°26′41″N 99°1′32″W
- Area: 1 acre (0.40 ha)
- Built: 1924
- Architect: U.L. Freed
- Architectural style: Gothic Revival
- NRHP reference No.: 78002550
- Added to NRHP: January 30, 1978

Ipswich Baptist Church is a historic church at Main Street and 3rd Avenue in Ipswich, South Dakota, that includes Gothic Revival architecture. It was built in 1924.

It was added to the National Register in 1978.

It was a work of Ursa Louis Freed, an architect who worked in North and South Dakota, who also co-designed the 1929 Codington County Courthouse,. The courthouse and works of Freed in Aberdeen and Faith, South Dakota, are also listed on the National Register.
