= Perkins & McWayne =

American architectural firm (1917–1954)

Practice information
- Founders: Robert A. Perkins; Albert McWayne AIA
- Founded: 1917
- Location: Sioux Falls, South Dakota

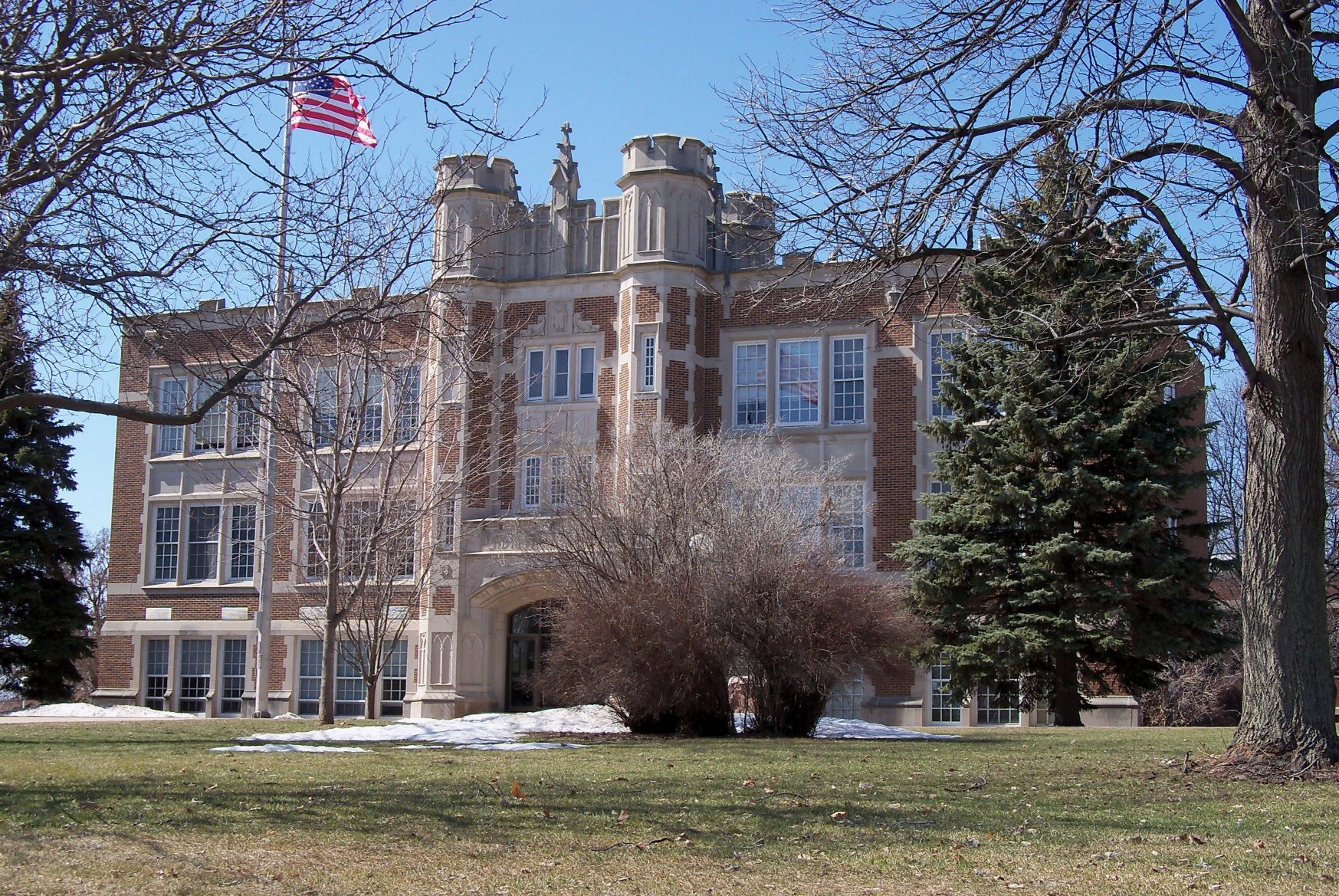
The Administration Building of Augustana University, designed by Perkins & McWayne in the Collegiate Gothic style and completed in 1920.

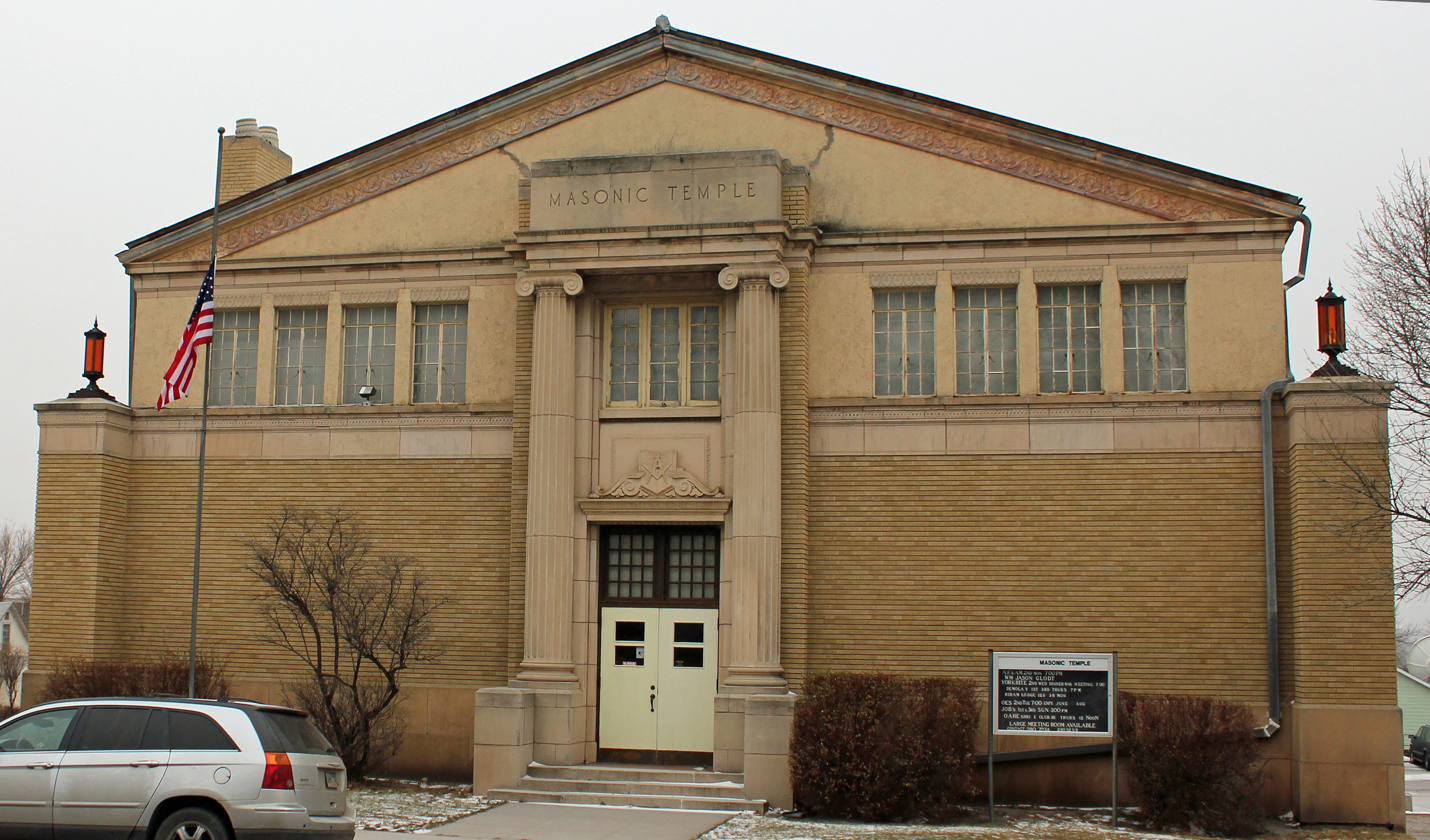
The Pierre Masonic Lodge, designed by Perkins & McWayne in the Beaux-Arts style and completed in 1928.

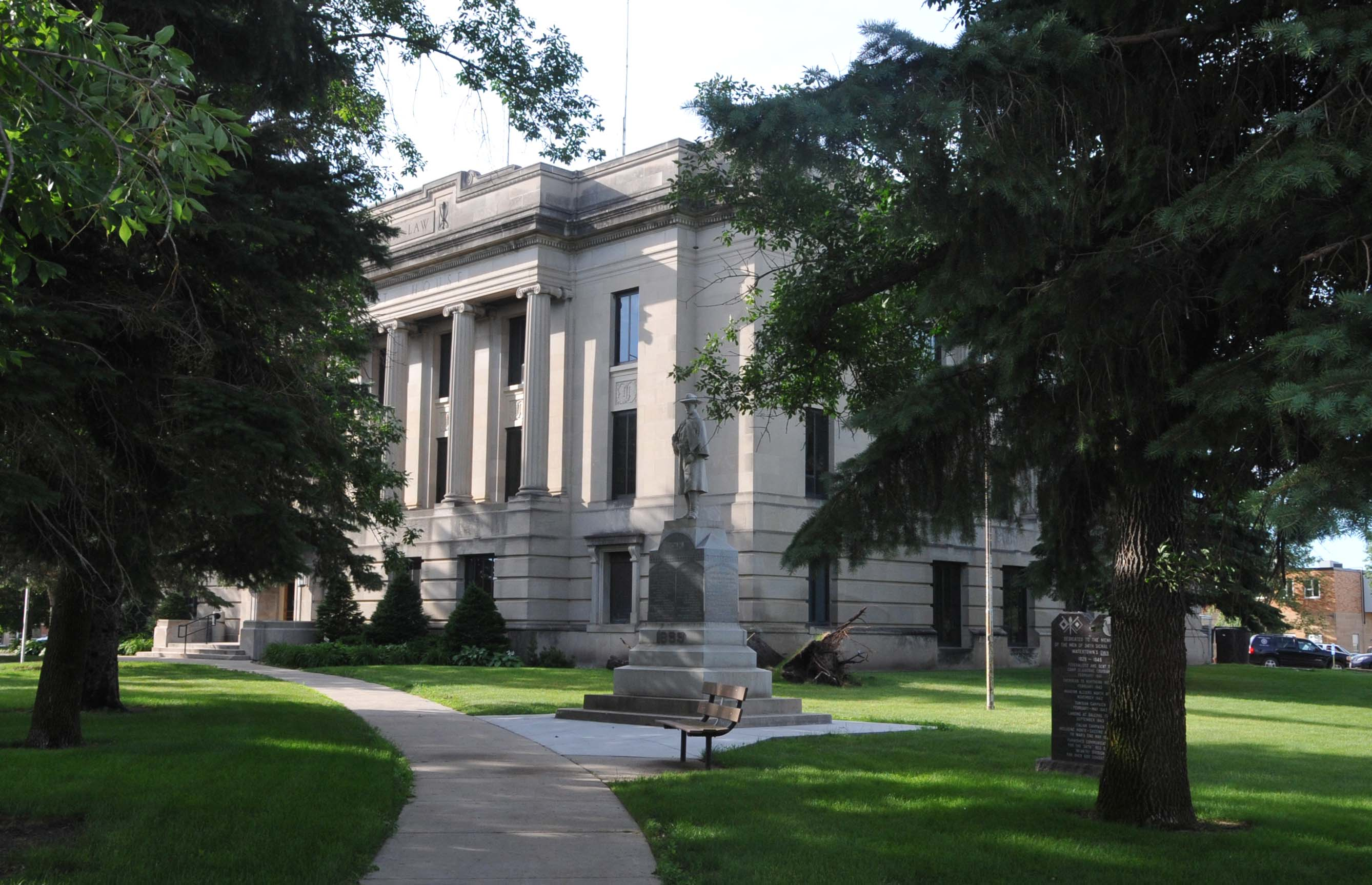
The Codington County Courthouse in Watertown, designed by associated architects Perkins & McWayne and Ursa Louis Freed in the Beaux-Arts style and completed in 1929.

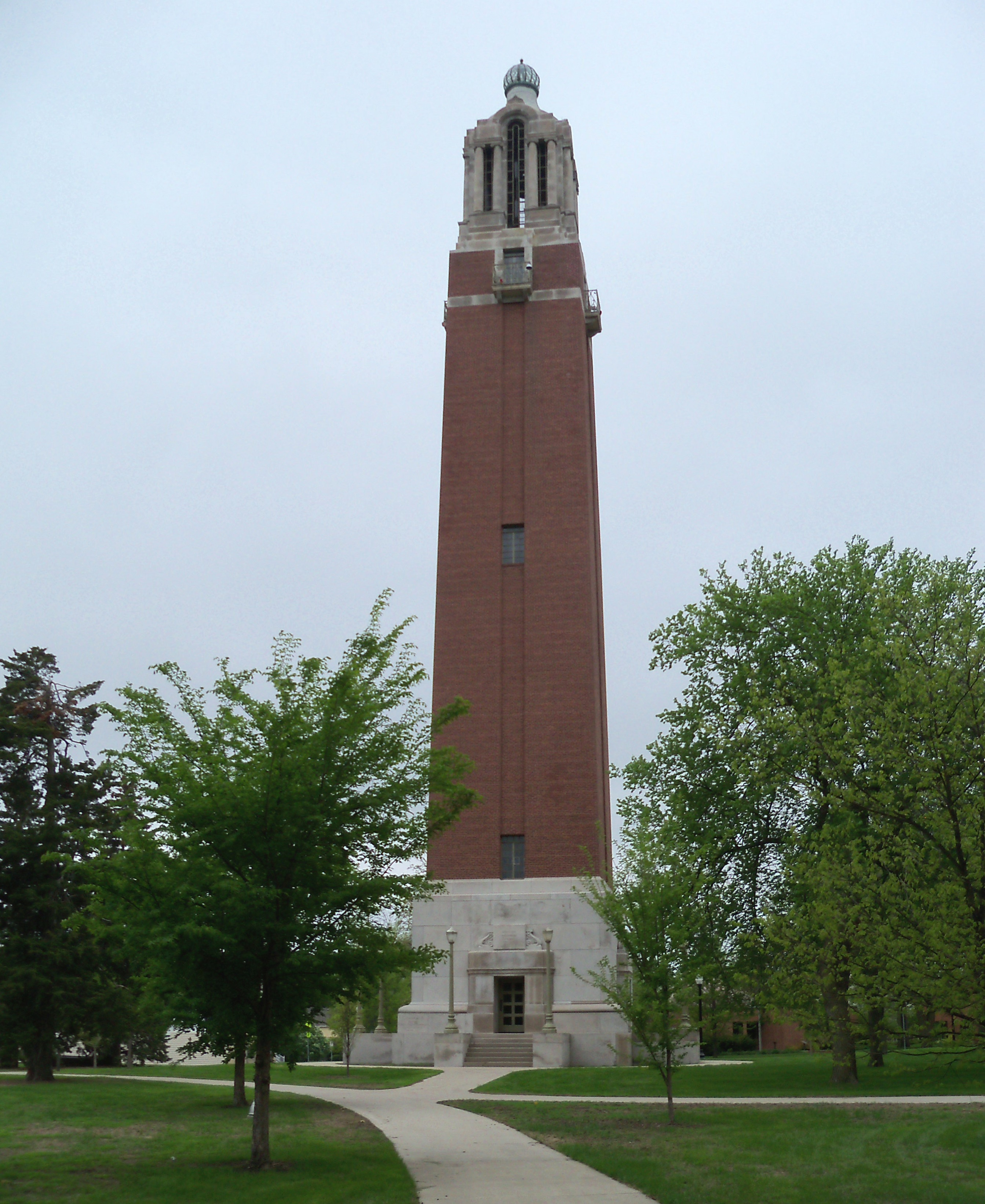
The Coughlin Campanile of South Dakota State University, designed by Perkins & McWayne in the Beaux-Arts style and completed in 1929.

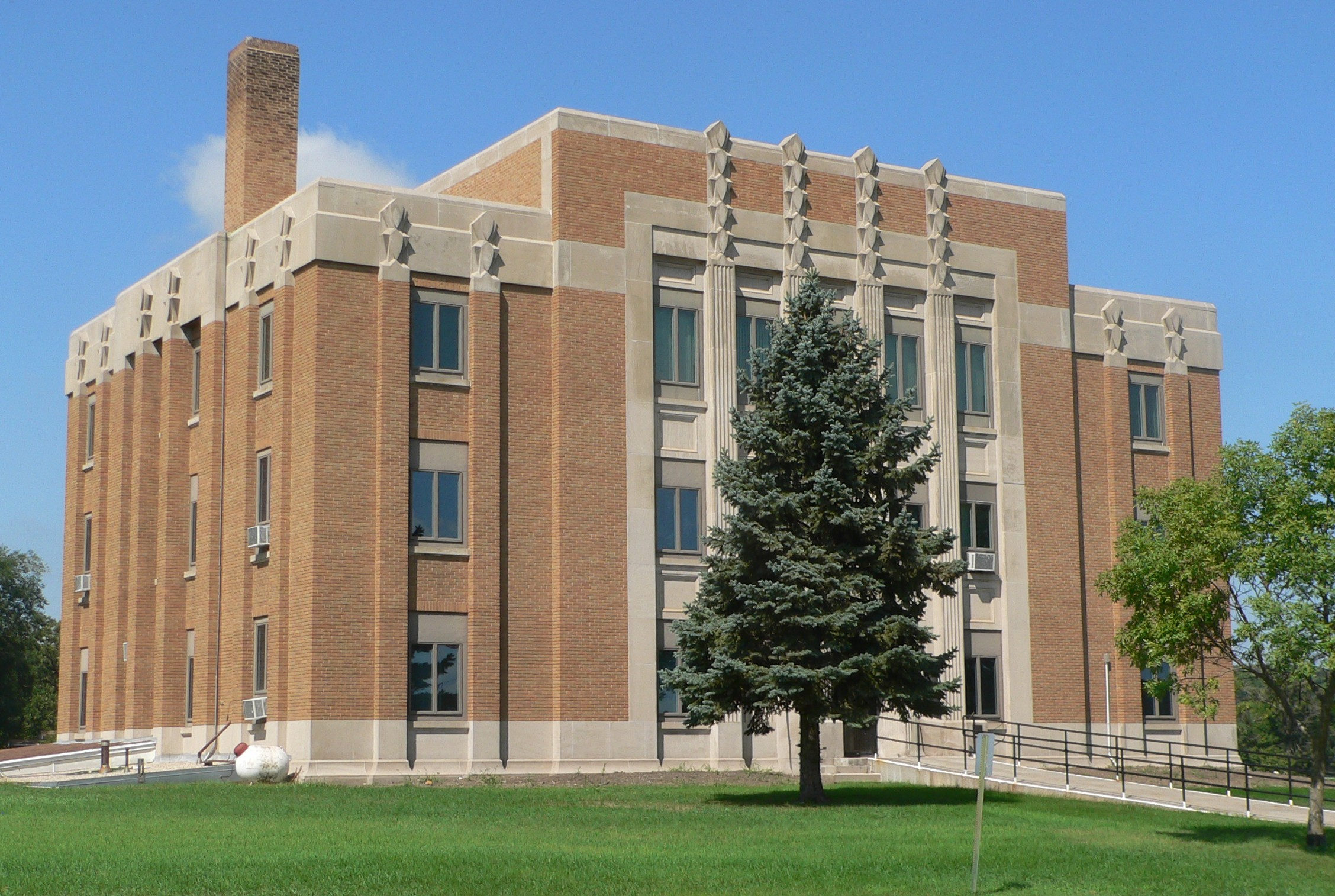
The Jerauld County Courthouse in Wessington Springs, designed by Perkins & McWayne in the Art Deco style and completed in 1930.

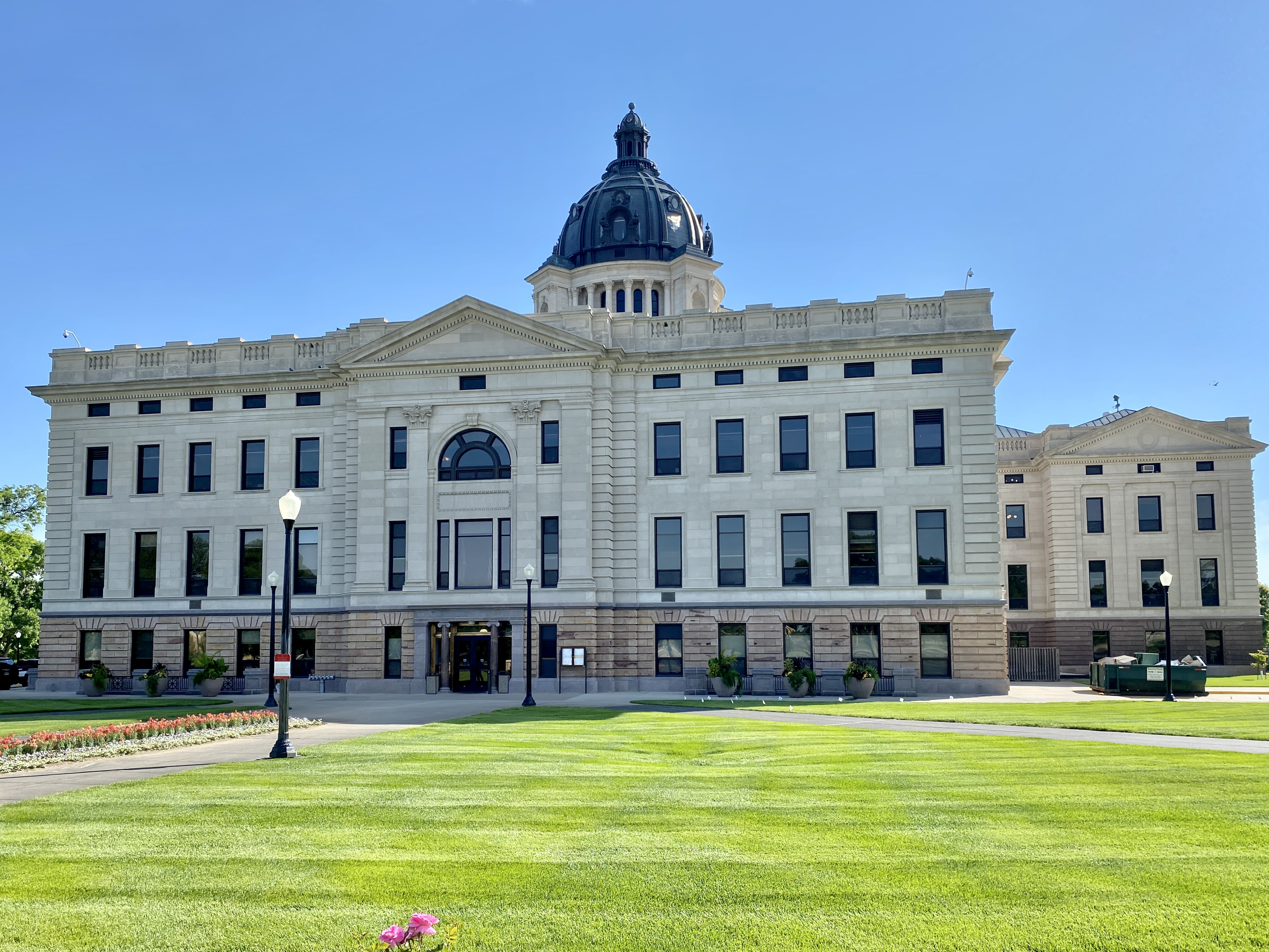
The South Dakota State Capitol annex in Pierre, designed by Perkins & McWayne in the Beaux-Arts style and completed in 1932.

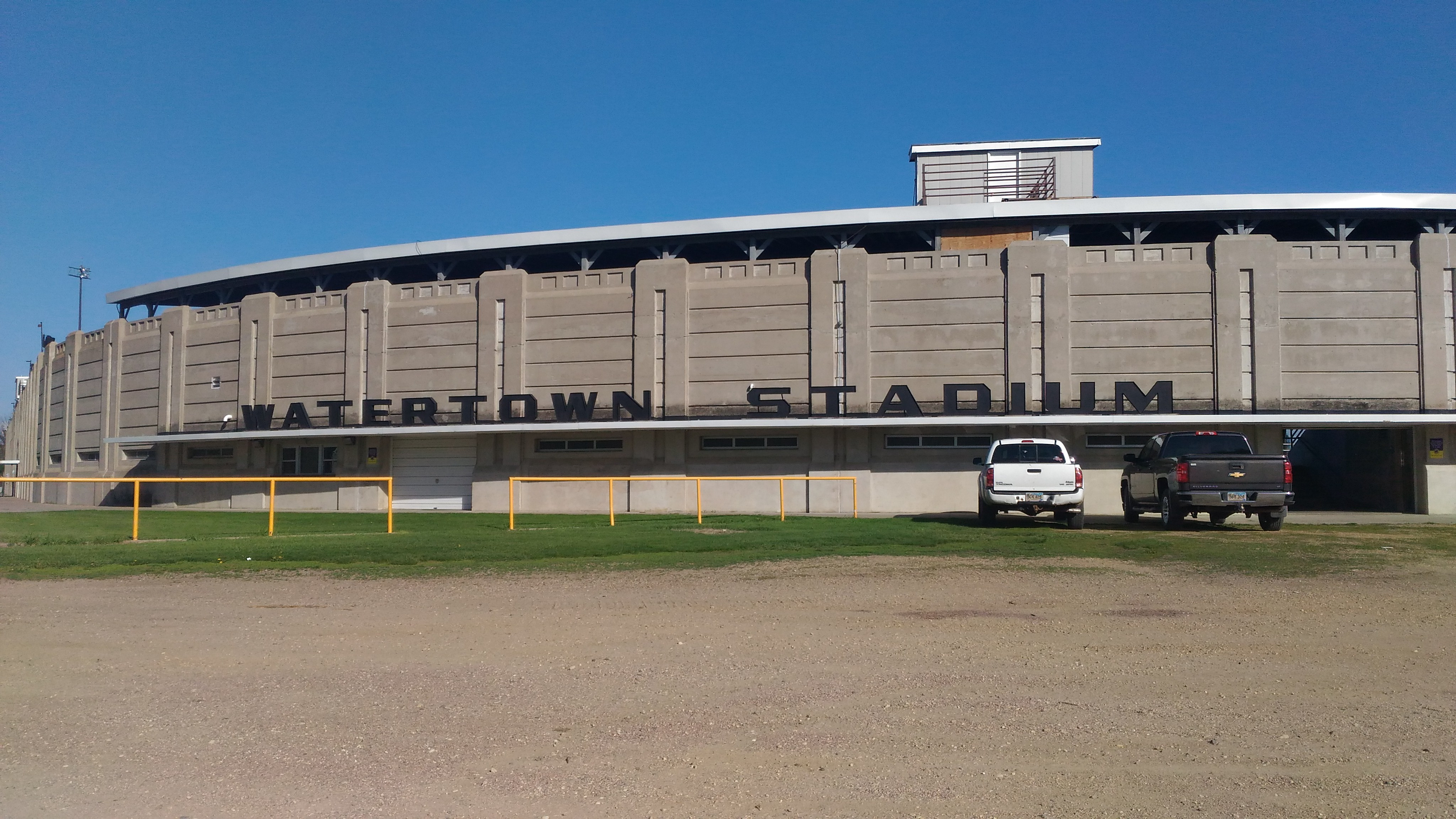
The Watertown Stadium, designed by Perkins & McWayne in the Art Deco style and completed in 1940.

Perkins & McWayne was an architectural firm based in Sioux Falls, South Dakota, and active throughout the state of South Dakota. It was established in 1917 by architects Robert A. Perkins and Albert McWayne.

== History ==
The firm which became Perkins & McWayne was founded in 1914 as the sole proprietorship of architect Joseph D. Livermore. In 1916 he formed the partnership of Livermore & McWayne with Albert McWayne. In 1917 Livermore moved to Madison, Wisconsin, and his interest in the firm was purchased by Robert A. Perkins and it was reorganized as Perkins & McWayne.

Perkins retired from the firm in 1944 due to his declining health. McWayne continued the firm under the same name until 1954, when he formed the partnership of McWayne & McLaughlin with L. Earl McLaughlin, an employee since 1938.

After McWayne's death in 1966, McLaughlin continued the firm as McWayne & McLaughlin until about 1969, and thereafter under his own name until his retirement in 1983.

== Partner biographies ==
=== Robert A. Perkins ===
Robert Augustus Perkins (November 5, 1882 – December 6, 1961) was born in Montello, Wisconsin. The family moved to Sioux Falls when he was about 12 years old. He was educated in the Sioux Falls public schools and at the Armour Institute in Chicago. He taught at Washington High School from 1909 to 1916, when he returned to Armour for a year of graduate study.

Perkins was well known as a singer as a young man. He was married twice, first to Eva Zeller in 1911, who died in 1920, and second to Marion Tufts in 1921. They had four children, three sons and one daughter. In retirement he lived in Yucaipa, California, where he died at the age of 79.

=== Albert McWayne ===
Albert McWayne AIA (November 8, 1885 – November 20, 1966) was born in Crown Point, Indiana. He was educated at Purdue University, graduating in 1910. He worked for architects and engineers in Chicago before moving to Sioux Falls in 1916. When architects were first licensed in South Dakota, McWayne was honored with license no. 1.

McWayne was married twice, first to Nettie Bell Chenoweth in 1912, who died in 1947, and second to Mary Lamont in 1949. He died in Sioux Falls at the age of 81.

=== L. Earl McLaughlin ===
Laurence Earl McLaughlin AIA (December 18, 1904 – August 31, 1998) was born in Rock Rapids, Iowa. He was educated in the public schools and at Washington University in St. Louis, graduating in 1934 with a BArch.

McLaughlin died in Sioux Falls at the age of 93.

== Legacy ==
A number of its works are listed on the U.S. National Register of Historic Places.

When McLaughlin retired, he donated the firm's records to the Siouxland Heritage Museums.

== Architectural works ==
=== Perkins & McWayne, 1917–1954 ===
- 1918 – Shriver-Johnson Building, (Note: NRHP-listed.) 230 S Phillips Ave, Sioux Falls, South Dakota
- 1920 – Administration Building, (Note: A contributing resource to the Augustana College Historic Buildings historic district, NRHP-listed in 1977.) Augustana University, Sioux Falls, South Dakota
- 1923 – L.D. Miller Funeral Home, 507 S Main Ave, Sioux Falls, South Dakota
- 1923 – Rapid City High School, 601 Columbus St, Rapid City, South Dakota
- 1925 – Deadwood High School (former), 716 Main St, Deadwood, South Dakota
- 1925 – Lyman County Courthouse, 300 Main St, Kennebec, South Dakota
- 1925 – Slagle Hall, University of South Dakota, Vermillion, South Dakota
- 1926 – George Stevens House, 21 S Riverview Heights, Sioux Falls, South Dakota
- 1927 – Douglas County Courthouse, 706 Braddock St, Armour, South Dakota
- 1927 – Lincoln Hall, South Dakota State University, Brookings, South Dakota
- 1928 – Coolidge Sylvan Theatre, South Dakota State University, Brookings, South Dakota
- 1928 – Pierre Masonic Lodge, 201 W Capitol Ave. Pierre, South Dakota
- 1928 – Old Redfield City Hall, 517 N Main St, Redfield, South Dakota
- 1929 – Codington County Courthouse, (Note: Designed by Perkins & McWayne and Ursa Louis Freed, associated architects. NRHP-listed.) 14 1st Ave SE, Watertown, South Dakota
- 1929 – Coughlin Campanile, South Dakota State University, Brookings, South Dakota
- 1929 – Glidden-Martin Hall, University of Sioux Falls, Sioux Falls, South Dakota
- 1930 – Haakon County Courthouse, 140 Howard Ave, Philip, South Dakota
- 1930 – Jerauld County Courthouse, 205 S Wallace Ave, Wessington Springs, South Dakota
- 1930 – South Dakota Union (former), University of South Dakota, Vermillion, South Dakota
- 1932 – South Dakota State Capitol annex, 500 E Capitol Ave, Pierre, South Dakota
- 1937 – Sturgis High School (former), 1425 Cedar St, Sturgis, South Dakota
- 1938 – Aberdeen Civic Arena, (Note: Designed by John W. Henry, architect, with Perkins & McWayne, associate architects.) 203 S Washington St, Aberdeen, South Dakota
- 1940 – Pugsley Center, South Dakota State University, Brookings, South Dakota
- 1940 – Watertown Stadium, 1600 W Kemp Ave, Watertown, South Dakota
- 1947 – Sioux Falls Bus Station, (Note: Demolished.) 301 N Dakota Ave, Sioux Falls, South Dakota
- 1951 – First Presbyterian Church, 401 N Lafayette Ave, Fulda, Minnesota
- 1953 – Berg Agricultural Hall, South Dakota State University, Brookings, South Dakota

=== McWayne & McLaughlin, from 1954 ===
- 1957 – Patterson Hall, University of South Dakota, Vermillion, South Dakota
- 1958 – Brule County Courthouse, 300 S Courtland St, Chamberlain, South Dakota
- 1965 – Holy Name Catholic Church, 1108 S Carroll St, Rock Rapids, Iowa
- 1966 – Brule County Jail, 201 W Kellam Ave, Chamberlain, South Dakota
