= Sturgis Williams Middle School =

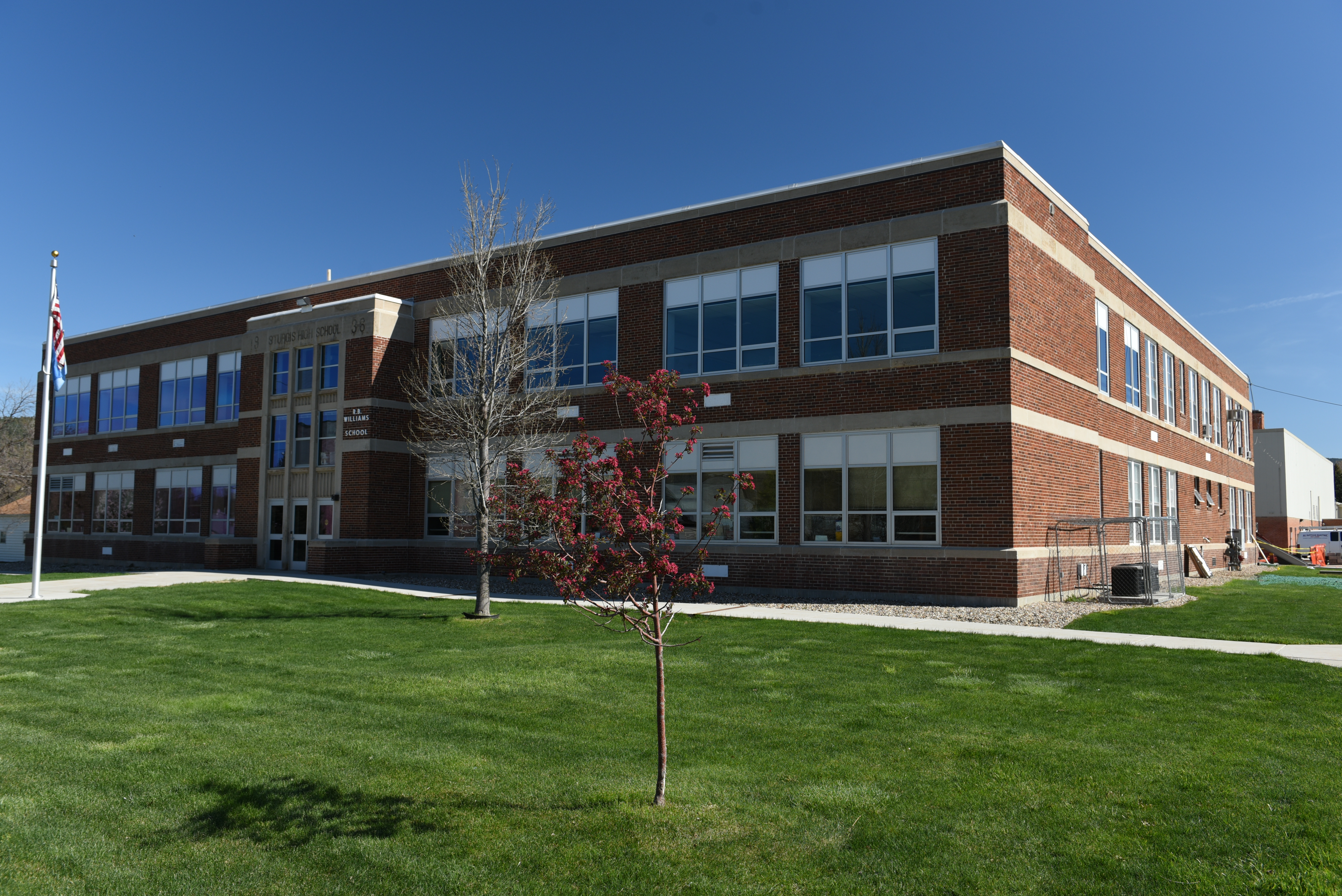

Location
- 1425 Cedar Street; Sturgis, South Dakota 57785; United States; 44°24′35″N 103°31′16″W

Information
- Type: Public
- Established: 1936
- School district: Meade School District
- Principal: Chad Hedderman
- Grades: 6–8
- Enrollment: 498
- Mascot: Scooper Sam
- Website: Official website
- Sturgis High School
- U.S. National Register of Historic Places
- Area: 4.9 acres (2.0 ha)
- Architect: Perkins & McWayne; D. E. Matter (addition)
- Architectural style: Collegiate Gothic
- MPS: Schools in South Dakota MPS
- NRHP reference No.: 00000998
- Added to NRHP: August 16, 2000

Sturgis Williams Middle School (previously known as Sturgis High School and later R.B. Williams Junior High School) is a middle school located at 1425 Cedar Street in Sturgis, South Dakota, United States, and is part of the Meade School District. The school draws students from all over the city.

The building was listed on the National Register of Historic Places on August 16, 2000.

== History ==
During the early 20th century, there was a nationwide movement across rural communities to provide new, larger school facilities with modern heating, lighting, and amenities, in an effort to enrich the quality of student learning. The original school in Sturgis, the Erskine School, had been built in 1901, before the state of South Dakota passed new standardized school construction guidelines in 1907. These guidelines set minimum space requirements and the mandatory installation of proper heating, ventilation, lighting, water, and other utilities; and regulated the placement of windows, doors, and fire escapes, among others. the This issue of outdated facilities could no longer be ignored when Sturgis school enrollment steadily began to approach the city's capacity in the 1930s. The Sturgis Independent School District went to the City of Sturgis for funds to construct a new school building, which they were granted in the form of bonds worth $112,000. Construction was approved in 1934 and commenced on the new building, less than a block away from the Erskine School. The new Sturgis High School was completed in 1936 and dedicated on April 1, 1937.

The high school was moved to the newer Sturgis Brown High School on January 1, 1959, and the former high school building became Sturgis Williams Middle School (then called R.B. Williams Junior High). On August 16, 2000, the school was listed on the National Register of Historic Places for its architectural design and educational history.

== Architecture and facilities ==
The school was designed by Perkins & McWayne, Sioux Falls architects, and built by H. H. Hackett, Rapid City contractor.

Built in the Collegiate Gothic architectural style common of large education buildings in the 1930s, Sturgis Williams Middle School is a two-story building with a flat roof and constructed out of red brick. It has rectangular double-hung sash windows. In 1954, D. E. Matter designed and completed an extension for the building, with assistance from Garland Construction Company, J. J. Electrical, and Glover Plumbing & Heating. This expansion increased the size of the classrooms, band room, and locker rooms.

Inside, the building is a U-shaped floor plan with the gymnasium and cafeteria in the middle. Its wooden doors and terrazzo floors and are original to the 1936 construction. The original band room and study hall have since been converted into smaller classrooms, and the original stage is now the cafeteria.
