= Ursa Louis Freed =

American architect

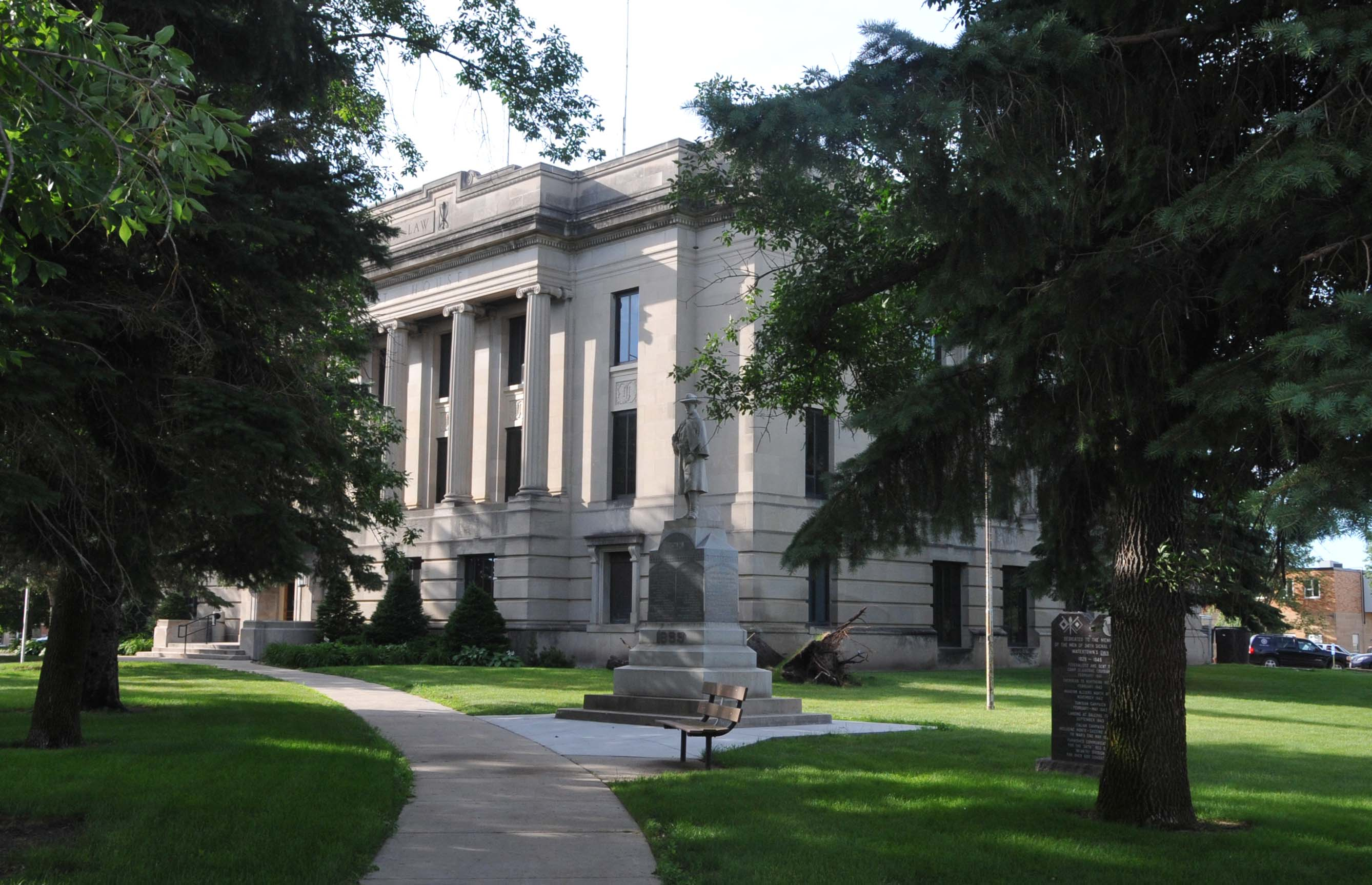
Codington County Courthouse co-designed with U.L. Freed with Perkins & McWayne

Ursa Louis Freed (a.k.a. Ersa, 21 June 1890 – 5 July 1957) was an American architect active in North and South Dakota. A number of his works are listed on the U.S. National Register of Historic Places. He was a member of the American Institute of Architects from 1951 until his death in 1957.

Works by U.L. Freed include (with attribution):

- Codington County Courthouse (built 1929), 1st Ave., SE, Watertown, South Dakota (Freed, Perkins & McWayne), NRHP-listed
- Ipswich Baptist Church (built 1924), Main St. and 3rd Ave., Ipswich, South Dakota (Freed, U.L.), NRHP-listed
- Municipal Building/City Hall (built 1941), 206 Main Street, Faith, South Dakota (Freed, U.L, Works Progress Administration), NRHP-listed
- Immaculate Conception Catholic Church (built 1949), Winner, South Dakota
- At least one building in the Aberdeen Historic District in Aberdeen, South Dakota.
