= L.D. Miller Funeral Home =

- U.S. National Register of Historic Places
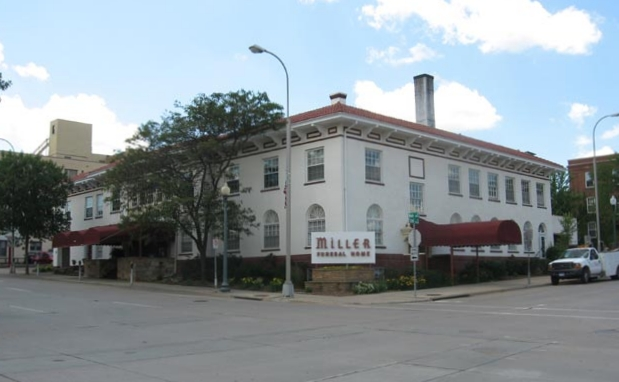
- Miller Funeral Home in 2009

- Location within South Dakota Location within the United States
- Location: 507 South Main Avenue, Sioux Falls, South Dakota
- Coordinates: 43°32′33″N 96°43′42″W
- Area: 0.7 acres (0.28 ha)
- Built: 1923
- Architect: Perkins & McWayne
- Architectural style: Mission Revival, Spanish Colonial Revival
- Website: www.millerfh.com
- NRHP reference No.: 83003014
- Added to NRHP: August 18, 1983

L.D. Miller Funeral Home, commonly known as the Miller Funeral Home, is a historic building at 507 South Main Avenue in Sioux Falls, South Dakota. It was listed on the National Register of Historic Places in 1983.

== History ==
In either 1902 or 1903, Lee D. Miller established his funeral home and a livery barn on South Main Avenue in Sioux Falls. In 1923, Miller hired local architectural firm Perkins & McWayne to build a new, larger facility on the property, as Miller had just incorporated two other local funeral homes—Burnside Funeral Home and Joseph Nelson Funeral Home—into his. Miller's wife was the first woman embalmer to be licensed in the state of South Dakota and worked with him at the funeral home. On August 18, 1983, it was added to the National Register of Historic Places for its architectural significance and contributions to Sioux Falls' economy.

== Architecture ==
Perkins & McWayne designed the building in the Mission Revival architectural style. As the business needed a large, wide space to accommodate its facilities and funeral services, the result was a two-story-tall rectangular floor plan measuring 81 by 220 feet (25 by 67 m). Its exterior is encased in white stucco laid over masonry. There are numerous Spanish Colonial Revival decorative elements, including a frieze consisting of a painted belt and rectangular accents between the brackets that support its red ceramic tile mansard roof. Red awnings shelter the building's street-facing arched doorways. The windows on the first floor are arched, while the second-floor windows are rectangular. A large chimney sits at the rear of the building. Inside, the service chapel contains a stained glass skylight.
