= Coughlin Campanile =

- U.S. National Register of Historic Places
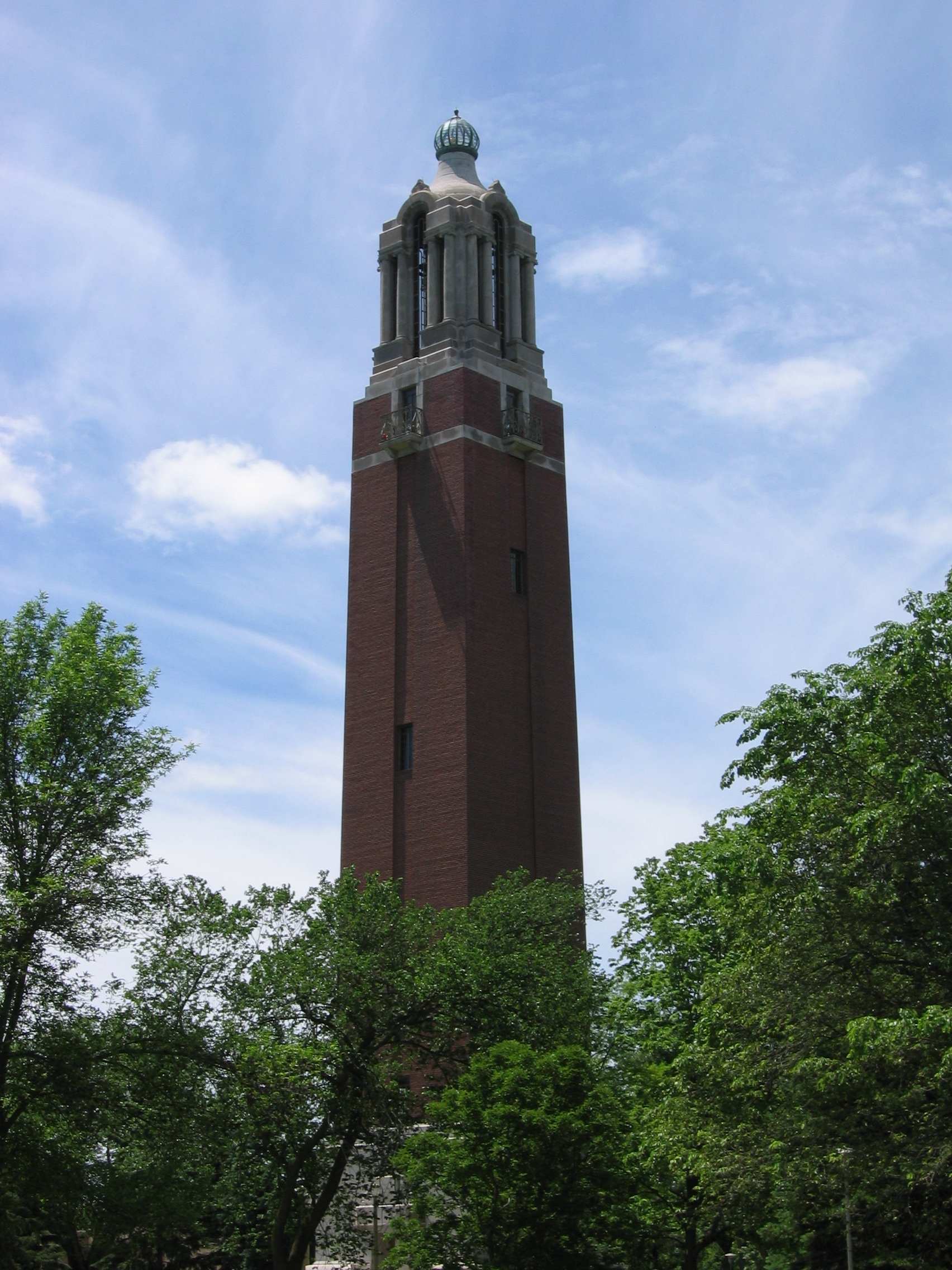
- Campanile on the campus of South Dakota State University

- Location within South Dakota Location within the United States
- Location: Medary Ave., Brookings, South Dakota
- Coordinates: 44°18′57″N 96°47′16″W
- Area: less than one acre
- Built: 1929
- Built by: Wold and Mark Construction
- Architect: Perkins & McWayne
- NRHP reference No.: 87000223
- Added to NRHP: February 26, 1987

The Coughlin Campanile is a chimes tower on the campus of South Dakota State University (SDSU). At 165 feet tall, it is the tallest chimes tower in the state of South Dakota. It was listed on the National Register of Historic Places in 1987.

The top observation platform is open to the public, accessed by climbing 180 steps. The tower's chimes cover three octaves and can be "played" manually from an organ in the nearby Lincoln Music Hall. The Campanile also appears in SDSU's business logo and on most letterheads.

Per its National Register nomination, "the structure is an important landmark for the campus of South Dakota State University and to the city of Brookings."

== History ==
The Campanile was designed by architects Perkins & McWayne and completed in 1929. At a cost of $75,000, it was a gift to the University from Charles Coughlin, a graduate from the class of 1909.

In 1995, a loudspeaker was installed to replace the original carillons, which are now housed at the South Dakota Agricultural Heritage Museum on the SDSU campus.

The Campanile underwent a $600,000 full masonry and stone restoration in 2001. It was restored again in 2024 for $1.3 million, replacing nearly 1,500 bricks that had deteriorated with weather damage.
