= Faith, South Dakota =

- City
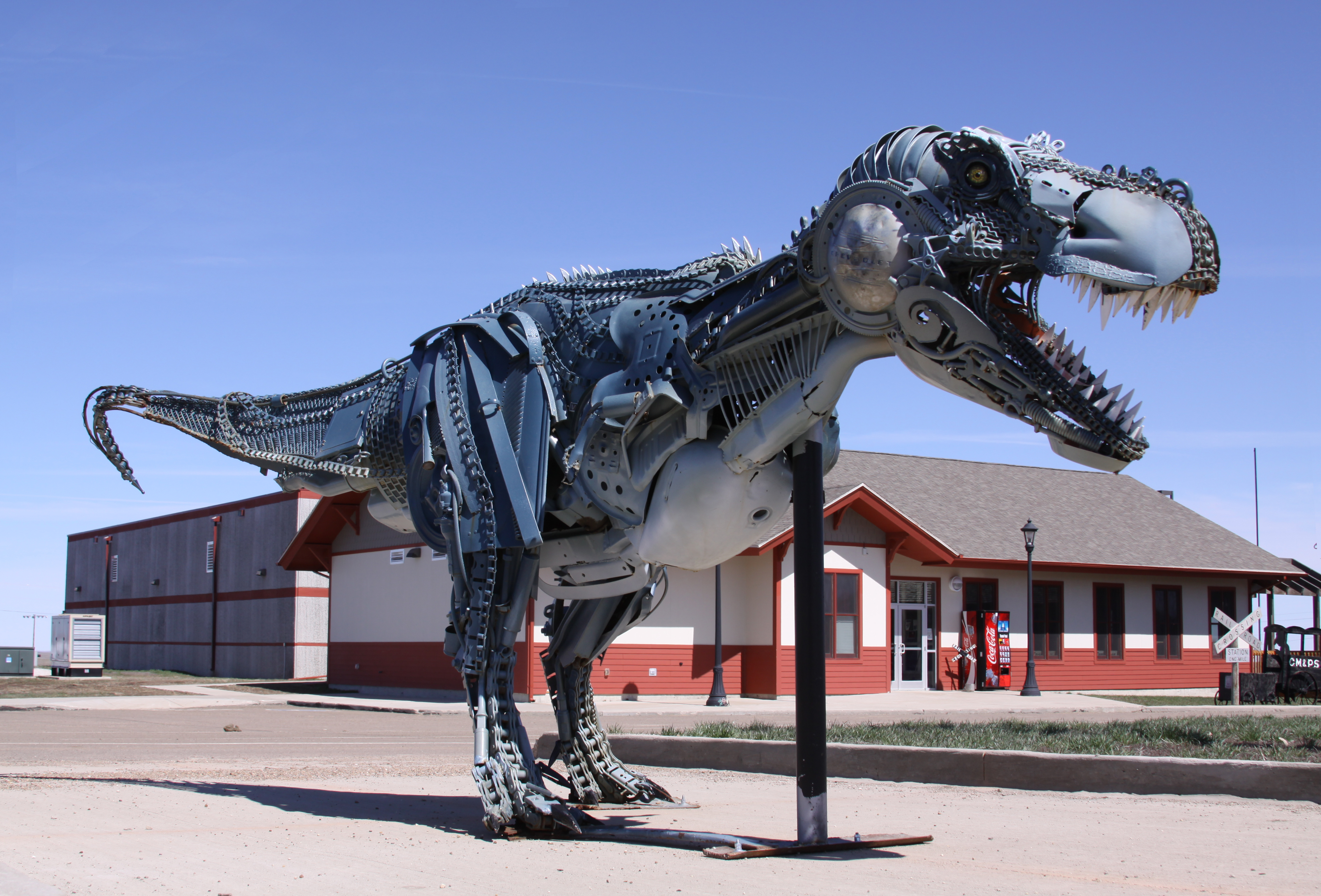
- A sculpture of Sue stands on U.S. Route 212 in Faith, across from the Prairie Oasis Hotel, April 2010
- Motto: "Welcome to the Prairie Oasis!"
- Location in Meade County and the state of South Dakota
- Coordinates: 45°01′33″N 102°02′11″W
- Country: United States
- State: South Dakota
- County: Meade
- Established: 1910
- Incorporated: 1912

Area
  - Total: 1.20 sq mi (3.11 km^{2})
  - Land: 1.20 sq mi (3.11 km^{2})
  - Water: 0 sq mi (0.00 km^{2})
- Elevation: 2,579 ft (786 m)

Population (2020)
  - Total: 367
  - Density: 306/sq mi (118.2/km^{2})
- Time zone: UTC−7 (Mountain (MST))
  - Summer (DST): UTC−6 (MDT)
- ZIP Code: 57626
- Area code: 605
- FIPS code: 46-20980
- GNIS feature ID: 1267388
- Website: faith.govoffice.com

Faith is a city in the northeastern corner of Meade County, South Dakota, United States. The population was 367 at the 2020 census. The most complete Tyrannosaurus rex skeleton known, Sue, was discovered approximately 15 miles (24 km) northeast of Faith in August 1990.

== History ==
According to folk etymology, the town was named Faith because it took faith to live out on the prairie. However, the story of the city as documented in various informal, locally published histories, is that the town was named for Faith Rockefeller, one of the daughters of a major investor in the railroad responsible for founding the town. This is in keeping with the names of other towns on the route of the old railroad (now abandoned), such as Isabel, South Dakota. Faith was the permanent end of the railroad, a local spur off the Milwaukee Road Railroad. The city was established in 1910.

Founded as the town at the end of the railroad, Faith was originally the hub of a homestead boom in the period 1910–1920; but the drought conditions of the 1920s that led to the Dust Bowl of the 1930s quickly replaced abnormally wet conditions of the early 20th century, and the harsh winters of the northern plains quickly drove many sodbusters to more hospitable regions. The town's location allows for ranch families in the area to have schools and stores closer than Sturgis, Fort Pierre, or other regional market towns, but early expectations of steady growth were never realized. Faith is still well known for its rodeos and livestock sales. The town's location made it a necessary stop on the Sunset Trail, also known as the Yellowstone Trail.

== Geography ==
According to the United States Census Bureau, the city has a total area of 1.20 square miles (3.11 km^{2}), all land.

Faith is located in the West River region of South Dakota, the section of the state located west of the Missouri River, and in the Northern Great Plains, on a ridge dividing the Cheyenne River to the south and the Grand River and its major tributary, the Moreau River to the north (both are tributaries of the Missouri).

Faith is the center of a vast cattle and sheep ranching area, and is the community center for hundreds of scattered ranchsteads. It is located in the extreme northeast corner of Meade County, South Dakota's largest: it is approximately 100 miles (160 km) to Sturgis, the county seat. It is also located immediately west of the boundary of the Cheyenne River Indian Reservation, home to several Lakota bands organized into the Cheyenne River Sioux Tribe (CRST). The region is well known for deer hunting and also offers pheasant, elk, and recently, prairie mountain lion hunting. A small reservoir, Durkee Lake, is approximately three miles south and offers a local recreation venue, with its boating, fishing, golf course, beach, and camping. Durkee Lake receives runoff water from Spook Creek, which is located about 6.2 miles (10 km) south of Faith.

=== Climate ===
Climate data for Faith, South Dakota (1991–2020)
Month	Jan	Feb	Mar	Apr	May	Jun	Jul	Aug	Sep	Oct	Nov	Dec	Year
Mean daily maximum °F (°C)	29.2 (−1.6)	32.4 (0.2)	44.7 (7.1)	57.6 (14.2)	68.1 (20.1)	78.6 (25.9)	86.7 (30.4)	85.5 (29.7)	75.8 (24.3)	59.0 (15.0)	43.3 (6.3)	32.4 (0.2)	57.8 (14.3)
Daily mean °F (°C)	19.9 (−6.7)	22.8 (−5.1)	33.8 (1.0)	45.4 (7.4)	56.0 (13.3)	66.3 (19.1)	73.5 (23.1)	72.0 (22.2)	62.6 (17.0)	47.6 (8.7)	33.4 (0.8)	23.1 (−4.9)	46.4 (8.0)
Mean daily minimum °F (°C)	10.6 (−11.9)	13.2 (−10.4)	23.0 (−5.0)	33.2 (0.7)	43.9 (6.6)	54.0 (12.2)	60.3 (15.7)	58.5 (14.7)	49.3 (9.6)	36.2 (2.3)	23.5 (−4.7)	13.9 (−10.1)	35.0 (1.6)
Average precipitation inches (mm)	0.50 (13)	0.71 (18)	0.97 (25)	1.95 (50)	3.23 (82)	3.12 (79)	2.89 (73)	1.60 (41)	1.32 (34)	1.58 (40)	0.59 (15)	0.59 (15)	19.05 (485)
Average snowfall inches (cm)	10.4 (26)	9.7 (25)	10.1 (26)	7.2 (18)	0.3 (0.76)	0.0 (0.0)	0.0 (0.0)	0.0 (0.0)	0.0 (0.0)	2.8 (7.1)	6.1 (15)	8.9 (23)	55.5 (140.86)
Source: NOAA

== Demographics ==
Historical population
Census	Pop.	Note	%±
1920	575		—
1930	607		5.6%
1940	522		−14.0%
1950	599		14.8%
1960	591		−1.3%
1970	576		−2.5%
1980	576		0.0%
1990	548		−4.9%
2000	489		−10.8%
2010	421		−13.9%
2020	367		−12.8%
U.S. Decennial Census

=== 2020 census ===
As of the 2020 census, Faith had a population of 367. The median age was 46.6 years. 25.1% of residents were under the age of 18 and 25.1% of residents were 65 years of age or older. For every 100 females there were 96.3 males, and for every 100 females age 18 and over there were 87.1 males age 18 and over.

0.0% of residents lived in urban areas, while 100.0% lived in rural areas.

There were 164 households in Faith, of which 32.3% had children under the age of 18 living in them. Of all households, 45.7% were married-couple households, 19.5% were households with a male householder and no spouse or partner present, and 30.5% were households with a female householder and no spouse or partner present. About 37.8% of all households were made up of individuals and 20.7% had someone living alone who was 65 years of age or older.

There were 205 housing units, of which 20.0% were vacant. The homeowner vacancy rate was 0.0% and the rental vacancy rate was 25.0%.

Racial composition as of the 2020 census
Race	Number	Percent
White	328	89.4%
Black or African American	2	0.5%
American Indian and Alaska Native	19	5.2%
Asian	4	1.1%
Native Hawaiian and Other Pacific Islander	0	0.0%
Some other race	6	1.6%
Two or more races	8	2.2%
Hispanic or Latino (of any race)	14	3.8%

=== 2010 census ===
As of the census of 2010, there were 421 people, 192 households, and 117 families living in the city. The population density was 350.8 inhabitants per square mile (135.4/km^{2}). There were 236 housing units at an average density of 196.7 per square mile (75.9/km^{2}). The racial makeup of the city was 91.0% White, 4.0% Native American, 0.7% Asian, 0.5% from other races, and 3.8% from two or more races. Hispanic or Latino of any race were 2.9% of the population.

There were 192 households, of which 28.6% had children under the age of 18 living with them, 47.9% were married couples living together, 10.4% had a female householder with no husband present, 2.6% had a male householder with no wife present, and 39.1% were non-families. Of all households, 36.5% were made up of individuals, and 17.2% had someone living alone who was 65 years of age or older. The average household size was 2.19 and the average family size was 2.91.

The median age in the city was 43.6 years. 25.4% of residents were under the age of 18; 4.3% were between the ages of 18 and 24; 21.4% were from 25 to 44; 29.5% were from 45 to 64; and 19.5% were 65 years of age or older. The gender makeup of the city was 51.1% male and 48.9% female.

=== 2000 census ===
As of the census of 2000, there were 489 people, 201 households, and 139 families living in the city. The population density was 408.0 inhabitants per square mile (157.5/km^{2}). There were 274 housing units at an average density of 228.6 per square mile (88.3/km^{2}). The racial makeup of the city was 89.78% White, 0.20% African American, 6.13% Native American, and 3.89% from two or more races.

There were 201 households, out of which 32.8% had children under the age of 18 living with them, 59.2% were married couples living together, 7.0% had a female householder with no husband present, and 30.8% were non-families. Of all households, 29.4% were made up of individuals, and 16.4% had someone living alone who was 65 years of age or older. The average household size was 2.43 and the average family size was 3.02.

In the city, the population was spread out, with 26.8% under the age of 18, 6.1% from 18 to 24, 21.5% from 25 to 44, 24.9% from 45 to 64, and 20.7% who were 65 years of age or older. The median age was 42 years. For every 100 females, there were 100.4 males. For every 100 females age 18 and over, there were 97.8 males.

The median income for a household in the city was $27,708, and the median income for a family was $38,333. Males had a median income of $22,250 versus $17,222 for females. The per capita income for the city was $16,276. About 7.5% of families and 10.8% of the population were below the poverty line, including 19.8% of those under age 18 and 7.7% of those age 65 or over.

== Education ==
Faith Public Schools are part of the Faith School District (South Dakota). The Faith School District has two elementary schools, one middle school, and one high school. Students attend Faith High School.

== Infrastructure ==
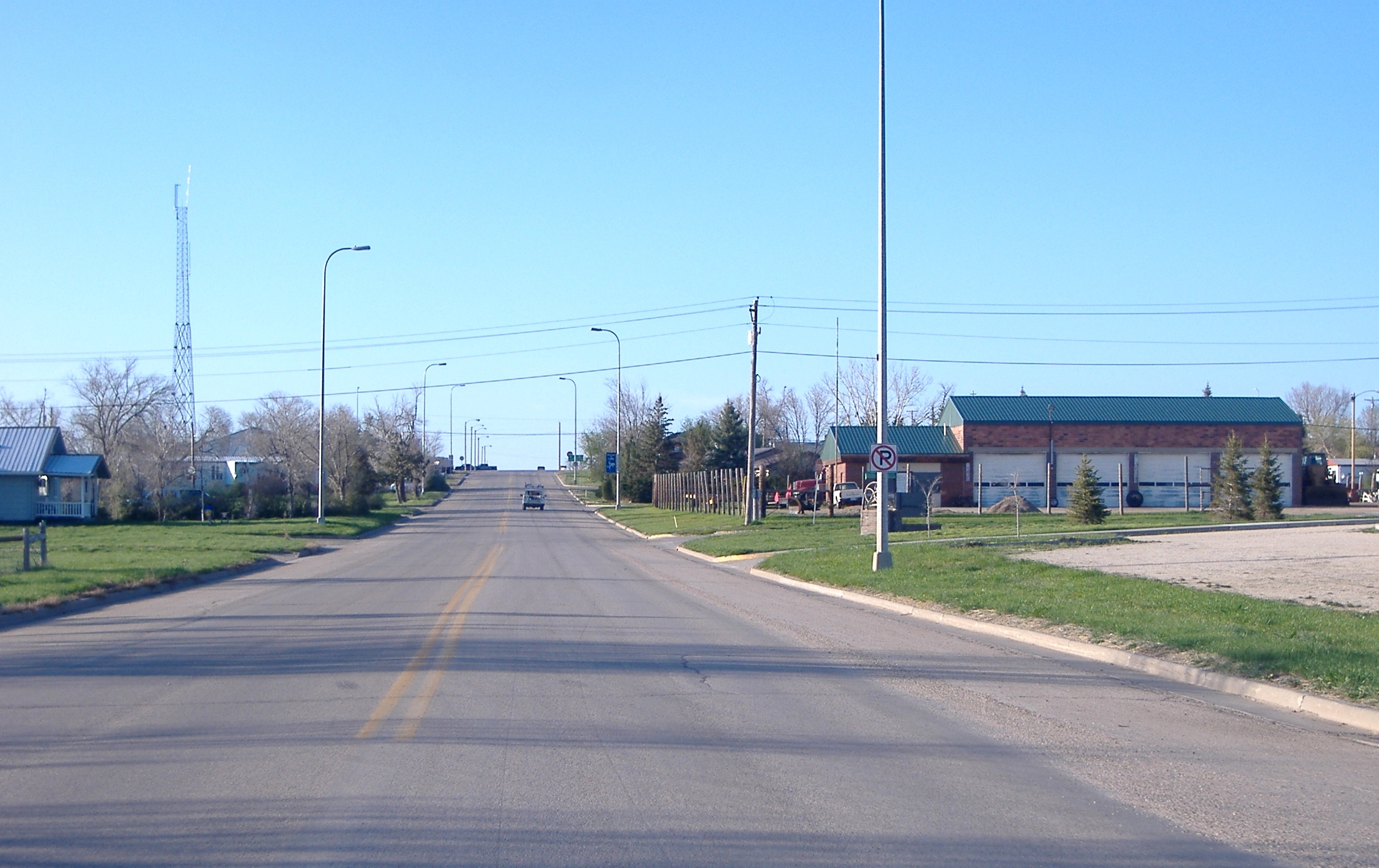
Looking north along SD 73 in Faith, April 2007

The Faith Municipal Building, designed by U. L. Freed, is listed on the National Register of Historic Places.

=== Transportation ===
Faith is accessed from U.S. Route 212 and South Dakota Highway 73. The nearest commercial airports are located at Pierre, the state capital, and Rapid City, the major market city of the region, located 100 mi (160 km) to the southwest. The railroad was constructed in 1910 and abandoned in the 1960s; there is presently no scheduled passenger bus service or freight service to the city.

== Notable people ==
- Catherine Bach, actress
- Cole Elshere, rodeo cowboy
- Marie C. Ingalls, member of the South Dakota House of Representatives
- Boyd Raeburn, jazz bandleader and baritone saxophonist

== See also ==
- List of cities in South Dakota
