= Faith Municipal Building =

- Municipal Building/City Hall
- U.S. National Register of Historic Places
- Location within South Dakota Location within the United States
- Nearest city: Faith, South Dakota
- Coordinates: 45°01′20″N 102°02′18″W
- Built: 1941
- Architect: U.L. Freed
- Architectural style: Art deco
- NRHP reference No.: 00000722
- Added to NRHP: 22 June 2000

The Municipal Building is a historic building located at 206 Main Street, Faith, South Dakota. It was constructed in 1941 under the supervision of architect U.L. Freed and the Works Progress Administration as WPA project number 4073. The building formerly served as city hall and police station, but is now the municipal bar and liquor store.

It was listed on the National Register of Historic Places in 2000.

It has a two-story section and a one-story ell. It was a Works Progress Administration project.
