= Aberdeen Historic District (Aberdeen, South Dakota) =

Historic district in South Dakota, United States

- U.S. National Register of Historic Places
- U.S. Historic district
- Location within South Dakota Location within the United States
- Interactive map of Aberdeen Historic District
- Location: Both sides of 3rd-6th Aves. and Jay, Kline and Arch Sts., Aberdeen, South Dakota
- Coordinates: 45°27′38″N 98°28′55″W
- Area: 29 acres (12 ha)
- Built: 1882
- Architect: Van Meter, E.W., Fossum, George; Freed, Ursa Louis
- Architectural style: Colonial Revival, Italianate, Queen Anne
- NRHP reference No.: 75001711
- Added to NRHP: June 5, 1975

Aberdeen Historic District in Aberdeen, South Dakota is a 29-acre (12 ha) historic district that was listed on the National Register of Historic Places in 1975. It includes three whole blocks and 13 partial blocks.

It includes part of Hagerty and Lloyd Historic District. It includes 62 contributing buildings, mostly residences but also six churches, five businesses, a public library, a public school and a private school. These include works by E.W. Van Meter, George Fossum, and Ursa Louis Freed, and includes Colonial Revival, Italianate, and Queen Anne architecture.

The Aberdeen Highlands Historic District and the Aberdeen Commercial Historic District, in the same town, are also NRHP-listed.
