= Old Redfield City Hall =

- U.S. National Register of Historic Places
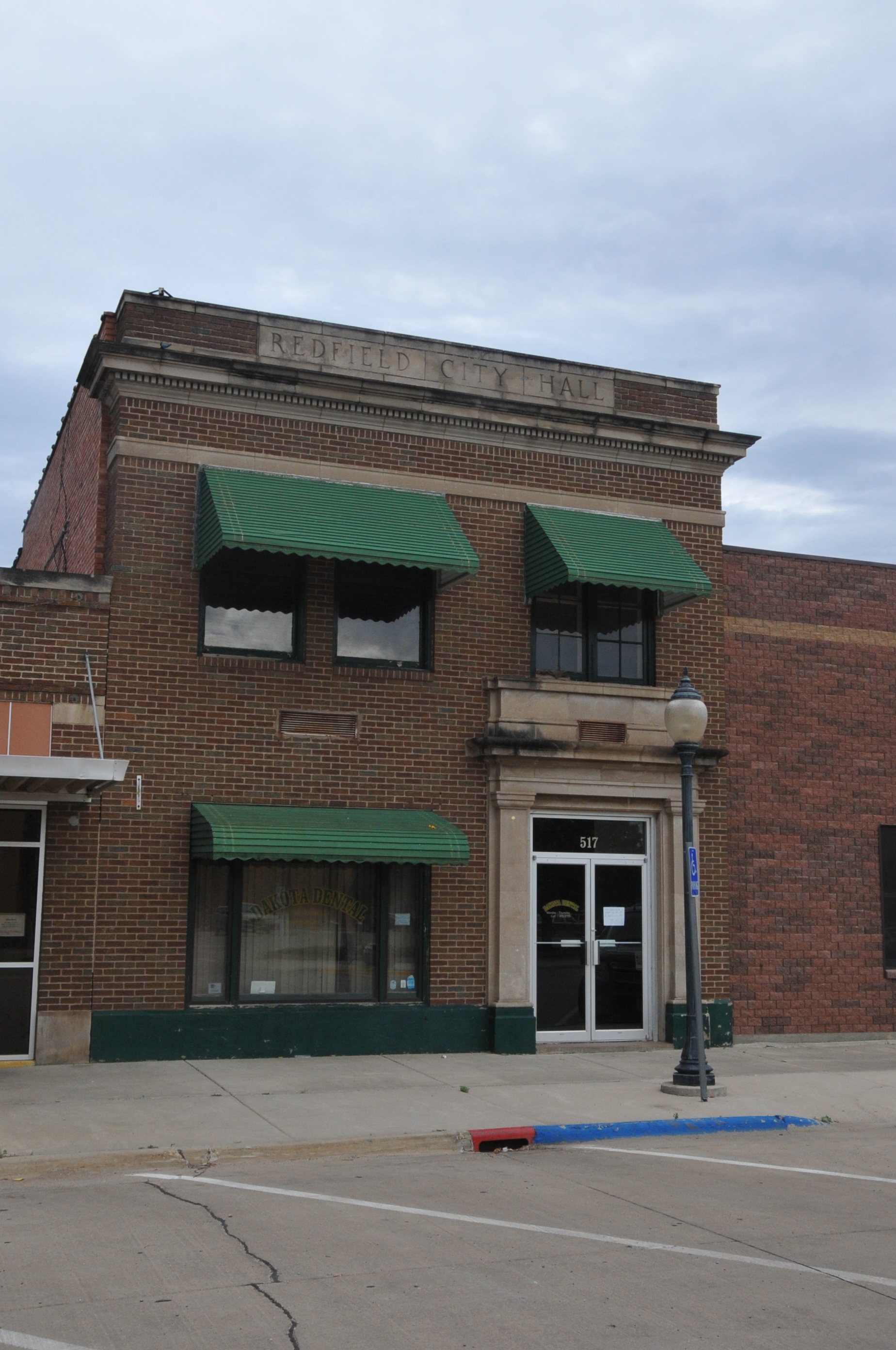

- Location within South Dakota Location within the United States
- Location: 517 N. Main St., Redfield, South Dakota
- Coordinates: 44.87745°N 98.51824°W
- Area: less than one acre
- Built: 1928
- Built by: Stolte & Dobratz
- Architect: Perkins & McWayne
- Architectural style: Early Commercial
- NRHP reference No.: 97000146
- Added to NRHP: February 21, 1997

The Old Redfield City Hall, at 517 N. Main St. in Redfield, South Dakota, was built in 1928. It was listed on the National Register of Historic Places in 1997.

It is a two-story brown and red brick building, 25 by 70 feet (7.6 m × 21.3 m) in plan. It served as city hall for Redfield from 1928 to 1979.

It was designed by Sioux Falls architects Perkins & McWayne, and was built by contractors Stolte & Dobratz.
