= Marie C. Ingalls =

American politician

Member of the South Dakota House of Representatives
- In office 1987–1992

Personal details
- Born: March 31, 1936 Faith, South Dakota, U.S.
- Died: April 15, 2023 (aged 87)
- Party: Republican

Marie C. Ingalls (March 31, 1936 – April 15, 2023) was an American politician. She served as a Republican member of the South Dakota House of Representatives.

== Life and career ==
Ingalls was born March 31, 1936, in Faith, South Dakota to Ida and Jens Peder Jensen. She attended the local school graduating in 1954 and then in 1955 marrying Dale Ingall. She worked as a teacher and became the Principal for Meade County rural schools from 1976 until 1981.

Ingalls was elected to the South Dakota House of Representatives in 1986 as a Republican. She served in the house from 1987 to 1992.

Ingalls died April 15, 2023, at the age of 87, and the flags on the South Dakota State Capitol were flown at half-mast in her honor for a few days in May 2023.
