= Watertown Stadium =

- U.S. National Register of Historic Places
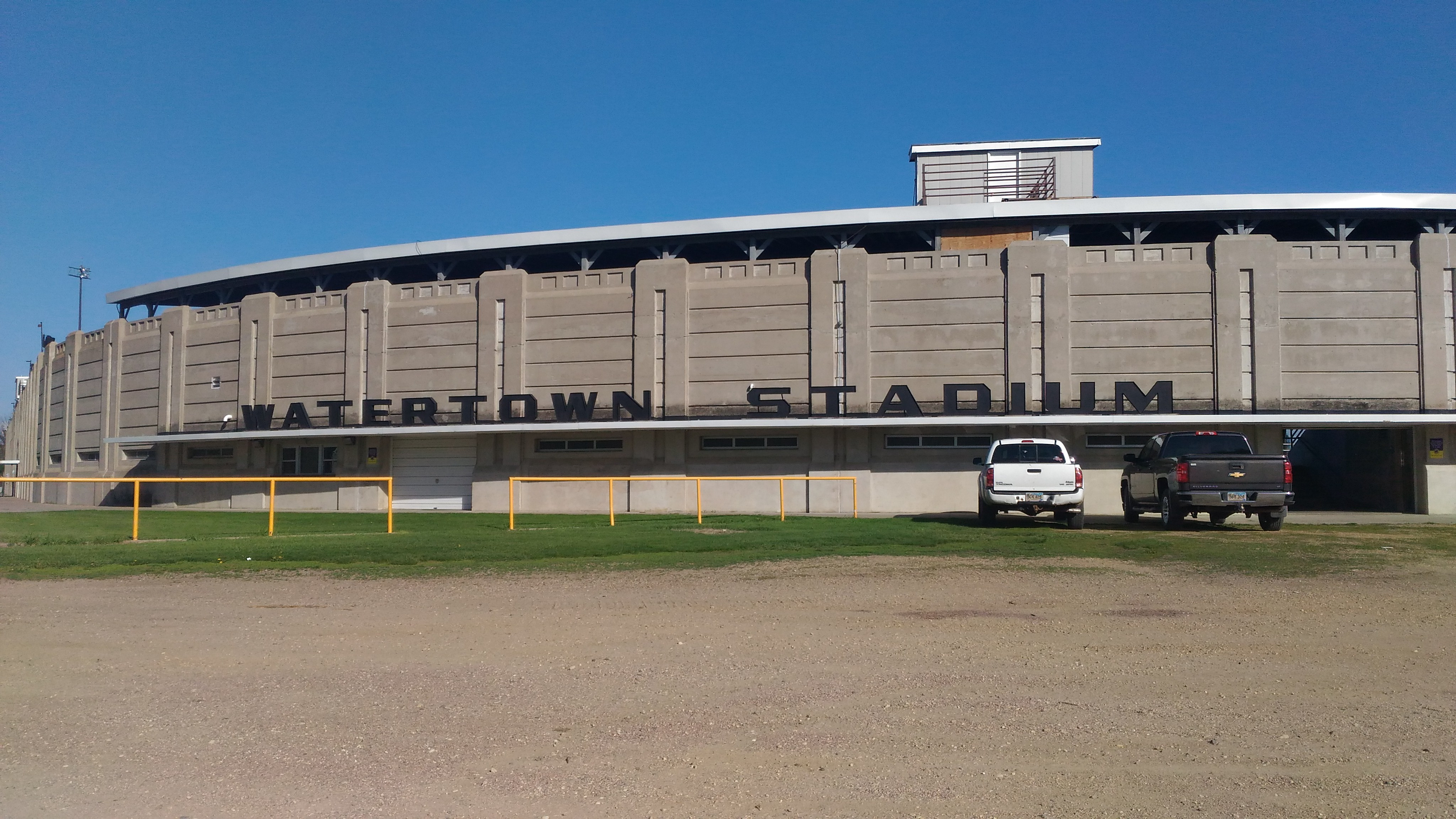
- The stadium exterior, May 2017

- Location within South Dakota Location within the United States
- Location: 1600 W Kemp Ave., Watertown, South Dakota
- Coordinates: 44.901958°N 97.139558°W
- Area: 3.7 acres (1.5 ha)
- Built: 1940
- Built by: Works Progress Administration
- Architect: Perkins & McWayne
- Architectural style: Art Deco
- MPS: Federal Relief Construction in South Dakota MPS
- NRHP reference No.: 00000721
- Added to NRHP: July 5, 2000

Watertown Stadium is a stadium in Watertown, South Dakota. It was primarily used for baseball and American football and was the home of minor-league professional baseball including, most recently (c. 1970), the Watertown Expos of the Northern League. The ballpark has a capacity of 5,000 people and opened in 1940.

It was most recently used by Watertown High School, to host baseball and football games, though its usage no longer includes. The stadium’s usage for football games was discontinued following the end of the 2024 season. Football games are now hosted at the Allen Mitchell Athletic Complex, starting with the 2025 season.

The stadium was built around the 1930s as Works Progress Administration Project 4265, and still holds the original plaque dedicating the structure. It is the home of the Watertown Arrows.

In 2005, an additional building was built to the East of the field. This building houses restrooms, a concession stand, and both Varsity and Sophomore locker rooms.

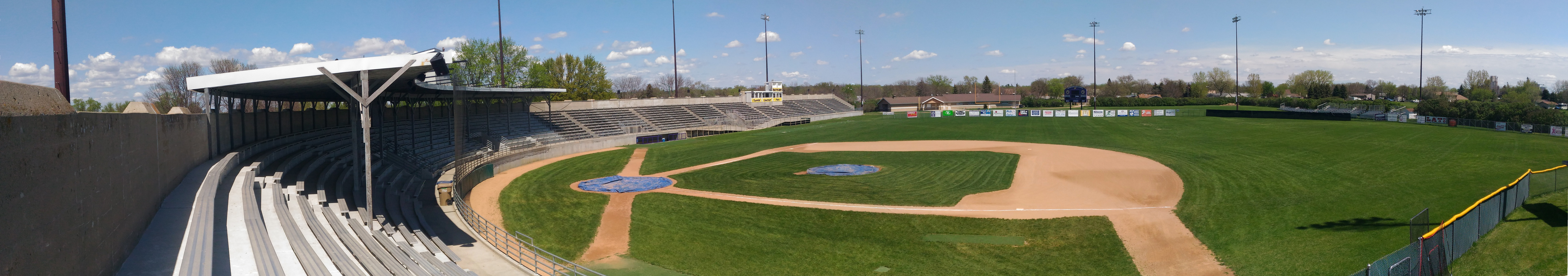
Panoramic view of the stadium interior configured for baseball, May 2017

The stadium was listed on the National Register of Historic Places in 2000. It is built of reinforced concrete.

Its NRHP nomination asserts:

The Watertown Stadium is a physical reminder of the unprecedented use of government aid to construct community improvements, particularly for recreation and leisure. Built in 1940, the stadium was reportedly planned as a band shelter, since the W.P.A. wanted to build them as part of their music project. According to a local story, the structure was built in phases, and it initially looked more like a bandshell. During the last phase of construction, it was then modified for use as an athletic stadium. Although the story is rumor, the existing structure is an excellent example of W.P.A. construction and one of the more outstanding federal relief projects in the northeastern part of the state.
