= Douglas County Courthouse (South Dakota) =

- Douglas County Courthouse and Auditor's Office
- U.S. National Register of Historic Places
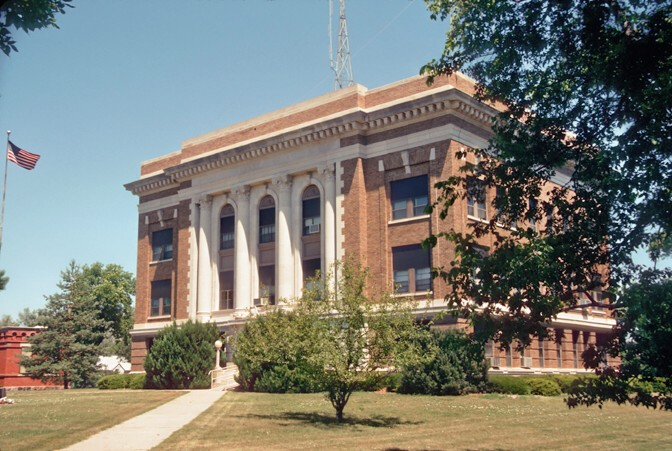

- Location within South Dakota Location within the United States
- Interactive map showing the location of Douglas County Courthouse & Auditor’s Office
- Location: U.S. Route 281, Armour, South Dakota
- Coordinates: 43°18′48″N 98°20′31″W
- Area: 1 acre (0.40 ha)
- Built: 1927
- Architect: Perkins & McWayne (courthouse); W.L. Dow & Sons (office)
- Architectural style: Classical Revival
- NRHP reference No.: 78002549
- Added to NRHP: March 21, 1978

The Douglas County Courthouse and Auditor's Office in Armour, South Dakota was listed on the National Register of Historic Places in 1978.

The courthouse, built in 1927, is a Classical Revival building designed by Sioux Falls architects Perkins & McWayne. It is a three-story red brick building, 81.2 by 61.2 feet (24.7 m × 18.7 m) in plan, with brick laid in Flemish bond.

The former auditor's office, which in 1976 was the Douglas County Museum, is a one-story brick building designed by W.L. Dow & Son which was built in 1902.
