= Casey Tibbs =

American rodeo cowboy and film actor (1929–1990)

Casey Duane Tibbs
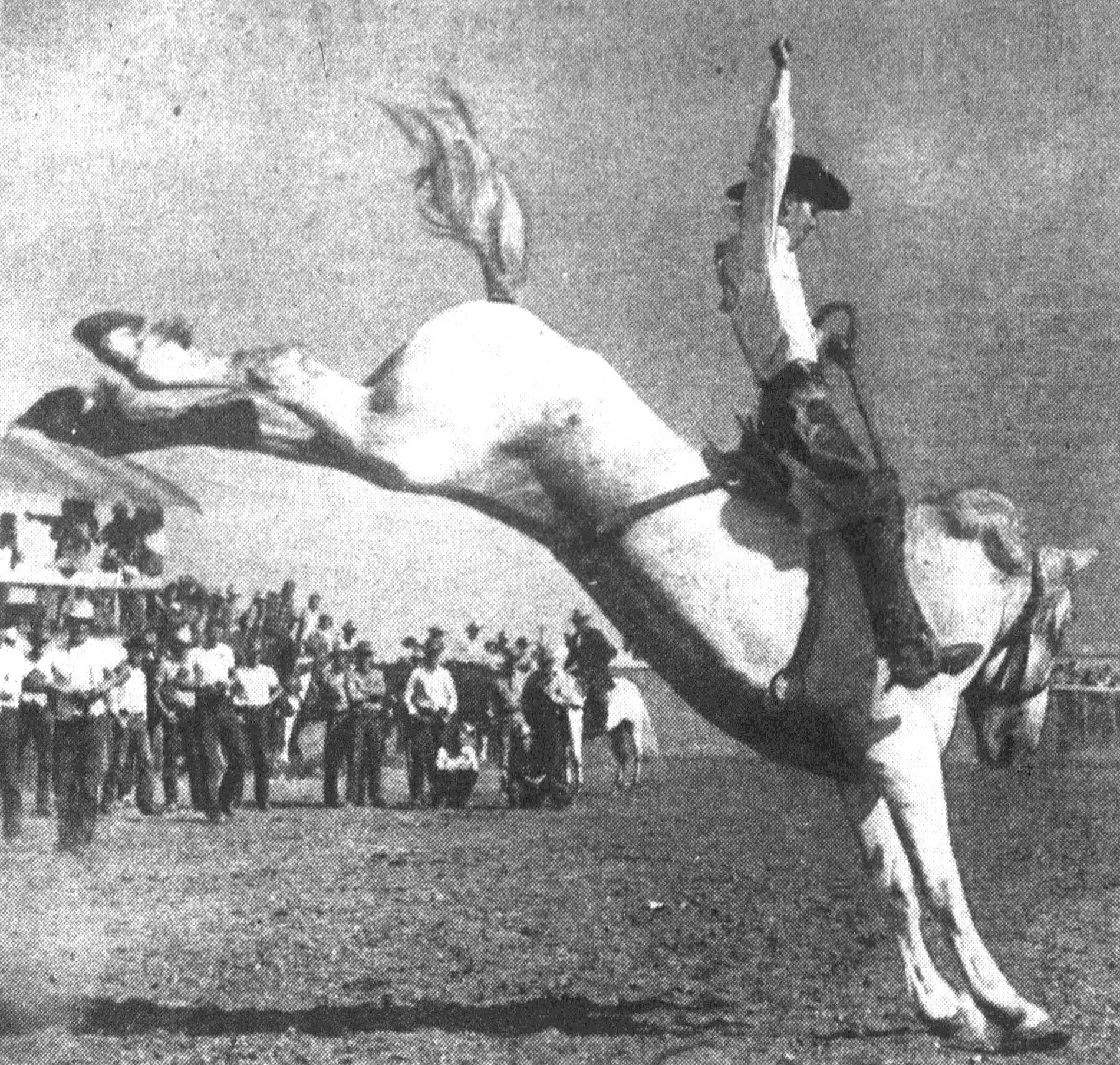
- Tibbs, circa 1951
- Born: March 5, 1929; Stanley County, South Dakota, U.S.
- Died: January 28, 1990 (aged 60); Ramona, California, U.S.
- Occupations: Rodeo cowboy, actor, horse breeder

Casey Duane Tibbs (March 5, 1929 – January 28, 1990) was an American professional rodeo cowboy and actor.

== Life and career ==
Tibbs was born to John F. Tibbs (1886–1948) and Florence M. Tibbs (1889–1974) in rural Orton, northwest of Fort Pierre in Stanley County in central South Dakota. He was of English descent. As a rodeo cowboy, he competed in the Rodeo Cowboys Association (RCA) and held the "World All-Around Cowboy Champion" title twice, in 1951 and 1955. He won in 1949, 1951–1954, and 1959, the world saddle bronc riding championship in 1951 world bareback bronc riding championship. He was featured on the October 22, 1951 cover of Life magazine.

He moved to Ramona, California in 1976 to raise and breed horses. After battling bone cancer and then lung cancer for about a year, he died at his home in Ramona, while watching the 1990 Super Bowl. He is interred at the Scotty Philip Cemetery in Fort Pierre, South Dakota.

== Selected filmography ==
After his successful rodeo career, Tibbs became a stunt man, stunt coordinator, technical director, livestock consultant, wrangler, and actor for the film industry. He wrote, produced, directed, and starred in the film Born to Buck.

- Actor:
  - Bronco Buster (1952) as Rodeo Rider
  - Screen Director's Playhouse (1956, Episode: "Partners") (with Brandon deWilde) as himself
  - Bus Stop (1956) as himself (uncredited but announced by rodeo announcer)
  - To Tell the Truth (1957) as himself (uncredited)
  - Wild Heritage (1958) as Rusty (trail boss)
  - The Ann Sothern Show (1959, Episode: "Katie and the Cowboy")
  - Tales of Wells Fargo (1961, Episode: "Town Against a Man") as Sheriff Jim Hogan
  - Tomboy and the Champ (1961) as Himself
  - A Thunder of Drums (1961) as Trooper Baker
  - Stoney Burke (1962–1963) as Rodeo Judge
  - The Rounders (1965) as Rafe
  - Branded (1965, TV Series) as The Cowboy
  - Gunpoint (1966) as Dealer (uncredited)
  - The Rounders (1966, TV Series) as Folliat / Buck / 3rd Posseman
  - The Monroes (1967, Episode: "To Break a Colt") (uncredited)
  - A Time for Dying (1969) as Southerner's Sidekick
  - The Young Rounders (1972)
  - Junior Bonner (1972, rodeo coordinator) as Parade Grand Marshal (uncredited)
  - Climb an Angry Mountain (1972, TV Movie) as Buck Moto
  - The Waltons (1974, Episode: "The Conflict") as Flagman
  - Breakheart Pass (1975) as Jackson
  - More Wild Wild West (1980, TV Movie) as Juanita's brother (final film role)
- Stunts:
  - A Thunder of Drums (1961) (stunts) (uncredited)
  - The Rounders (1965) (stunts)
  - Gunpoint (1966) (stunts) (uncredited)
  - The Plainsman (1966) (stunts) (uncredited)
  - Texas Across the River (1966) (stunt coordinator) (uncredited)
  - Firecreek (1968) (stunts) (uncredited)
  - Heaven with a Gun (1969) (stunts) (uncredited)
  - The Cowboys (1972) (stunts) (uncredited)
  - Once Upon a Texas Train (1988) (TV) (stunt coordinator)
- Director:
  - The Young Rounders (1966)
  - Born to Buck (1966; and producer)

== Tributes ==
- Annual Casey Tibbs Ramona Roundup in Ramona, California
- 28-foot-tall bronze likeness, ProRodeo Hall of Fame, Colorado Springs, Colorado
- Ian Tyson wrote a song about Tibbs for the album I Outgrew the Wagon
- Mentioned in the film Smokey and the Bandit
- Mentioned in the film Cotter
- Mentioned in the Chris LeDoux song "Back when we was kids".
- Cole Elshere plays the role of Casey Tibbs in "Floating Horses – The Life of Casey Tibbs".
- In 1979, he was inducted into the ProRodeo Hall of Fame, the highest honor in rodeo.

== Honors ==
- 1955 Rodeo Hall of Fame of the National Cowboy and Western Heritage Museum
- 1976 South Dakota Sports Hall of Fame
- 1979 ProRodeo Hall of Fame
- 2001 Ellensburg Rodeo Hall of Fame
- 2002 Cheyenne Frontier Days Hall of Fame
- 2004 Pendleton Round-Up and Happy Canyon Hall of Fame
- 2010 Texas Trail of Fame
- 2018 California Rodeo Salinas Hall of Fame
- 2024 PBR Ty Murray Top Hand Award

== In popular culture ==
Mentioned in "Life of a Rodeo Cowboy", recorded by Merle Haggard, written by Jeannie Seely.

The song Casey Tibbs, also known as Casey the Rainbow Rider, by Ian Tyson.

The song "Legend Known as Casey" by Kyle Evans

The song Tibbs by cowboy singer/songwriter Matt Robertson. Also mentioned in Robertson's Bronc Star.

Mentioned in the film Smokey and the Bandit. While discussing their different interests, Bandit asks Frog, "Do you know who Casey Tibbs is?"
