= Codington County Courthouse =

- U.S. National Register of Historic Places
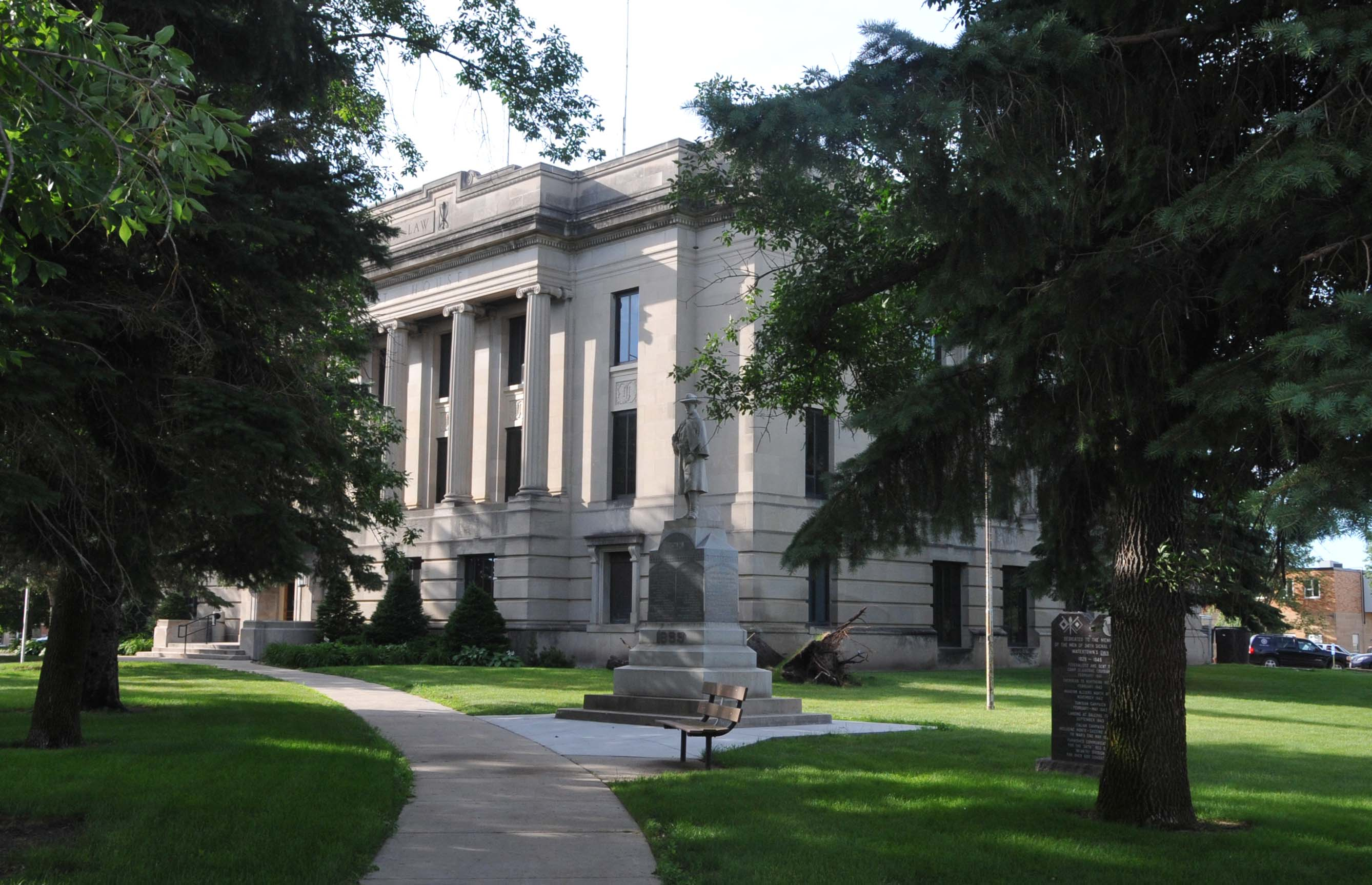
- Codington County Courthouse in July 2013

- Location within South Dakota Location within the United States
- Nearest city: Watertown, South Dakota
- Coordinates: 44°53′55″N 97°06′51″W
- Built: 1929
- Architect: Freed, Perkins & McWayne
- Architectural style: Classical revival
- NRHP reference No.: 78002545
- Added to NRHP: 24 July 1978

The Codington County Courthouse is a courthouse serving Codington County, located at 14 First Avenue Southeast, Watertown, South Dakota. Codington County is part of South Dakota's Third Circuit Court.

The building was constructed by Gray Construction, under the direction of architects Freed, Perkins & McWayne, between 1925 and 1929 at a cost US$375,000 (equivalent to $7,031,250 in 2025). The rotunda features two large murals painted by Vincent Aderente of New York, although his name is misspelled as Adoratti on the historical marker at the courthouse grounds.

It was listed on the National Register of Historic Places in 1978.
