= Cole Elshere =

American rodeo cowboy (born 1989)

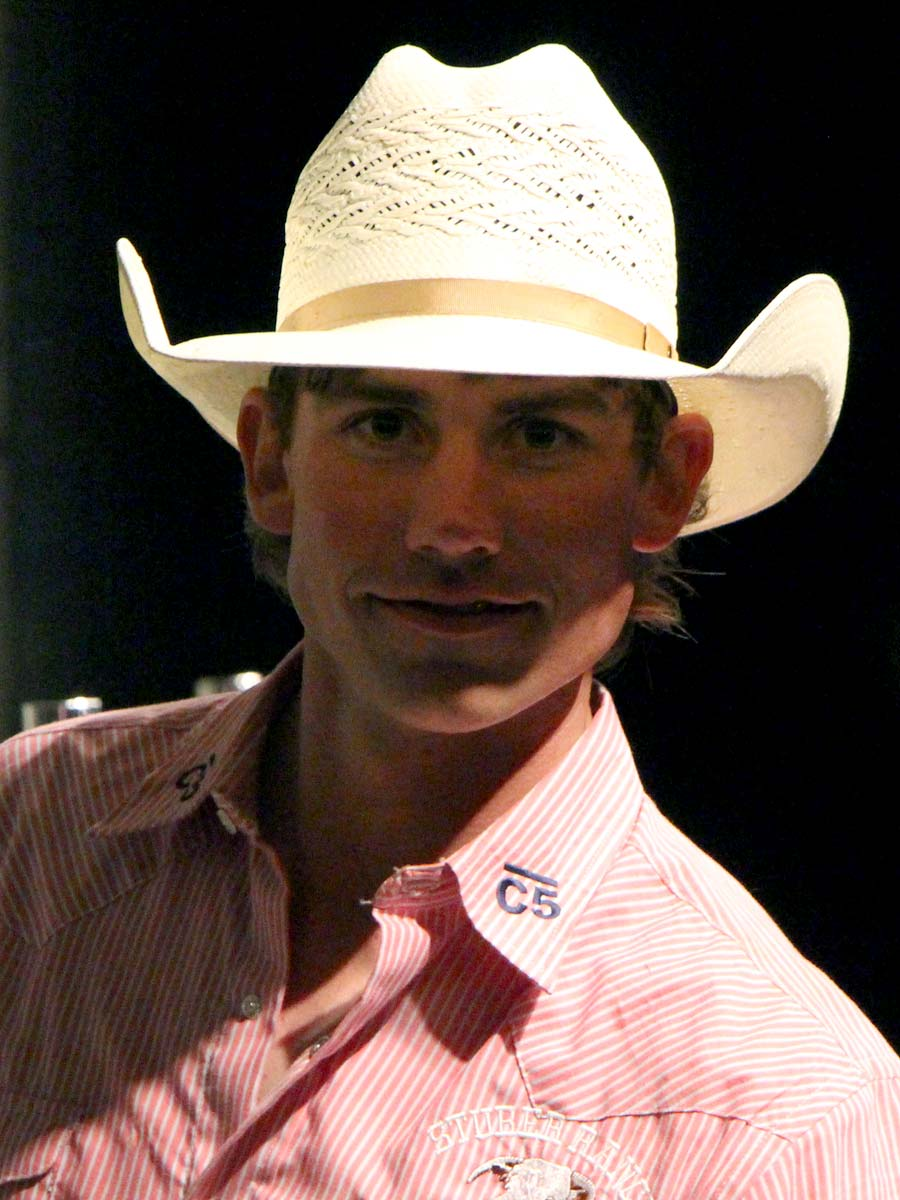
- Cole Elshere after taking second at the Casey Tibbs Match of Champions Rodeo.
- Born: December 12, 1989 (age 36); Faith, South Dakota, United States
- Occupations: rodeo cowboy and rancher

Cole Elshere (born December 12, 1989) is an American professional rodeo cowboy who specializes in saddle bronc riding. He qualified for the 2012, 2013, 2014, and 2020 National Finals Rodeo.

== Background ==
Cole was born and still lives in Faith, South Dakota. He received a business associate degree from Gillette College. His heroes are his cousins JJ & Ryan Elshere, both saddle bronc riders.

Elshere portrayed saddle-bronc-riding legend Casey Tibbs in the documentary film Floating Horses, which premiered at the Black Hills Film Festival in April 2017.

== Rodeo career ==
In 2009, Elshere won the PRCA Championship Rodeo, the Ashley Rodeo and the Rosebud Casino. He was co-champion at the Energy Town Pro Rodeo at the Sturgis Western Heritage Rodeo. He was the 2009 Badlands Circuit year-end champion.

Elshere was the 2010 Central Rocky Mountain regional champion for the National Intercollegiate Rodeo Association. In 2010, he won the Deadwood Days of '76 Rodeo, The Range Days Rodeo, The Hamel Rodeo & Bull Ridin' Bonanza, the Kit Carson County Fair & Rodeo, the Capitol Legends PRCA Rodeo, and wasco-champion at the Flint Hills Rodeo and he finished with earnings of $20,611 while competing on his permit.

In 2011, Elshere finished 26th in the PRCA World Standings and won A Tribute to Chris Ledoux Rodeo, the Amarillo Tri-State Fair & Rodeo, and the Ramona Rodeo and the Oregon Trail Rodeo. He was the 2011 Central Rocky Mountain regional champion in National Intercollegiate Rodeo Association.

In 2012, he finished 7th in the PRCA World Standings. Elshere won Round 5 of the Wrangler National Finals Rodeo and finishing fourth in the average standings at his first NFR. He won the NILE Pro Rodeo, Buffalo Bill Rodeo, the North Central Rodeo, the Yellowstone River Round-Up, and the Range Days Rodeo. He was co-champion at the New Mexico State Fair Rodeo, the Guymon Pioneer Days Rodeo, and the American Royal Rodeo.

In 2013, Elshere ranked 11th in the World Standing. He won the North Dakota Winter Show, the Interstate Rodeo, the Western Fest Stampede Rodeo in Granite Falls, Minnesota, the Range Days Rodeo in Rapid City, the Benalto Stampede in Alberta, Canada, the Scotts Bluff County Fair and Rodeo, and the Whoop-Up Days Rodeo in Lethbridge, Alberta, Canada. Co-champion at the Rotary Classic Rodeo, and co-champion at the Guadalupe County Fair & PRCA Rodeo. He ranked 5th in the 2013 Badlands Circuit in saddle bronc riding.

In 2014, Elshere ranked 14th at the PRCA National Finals Rodeo. Elshere won the saddle bronc riding title at the PRCA Championship Rodeo in Lincoln, Nebraska, and the National Western Stock Show in Denver. He ranked 4th in saddle bronc riding in the Badlands Circuit.
