= Spook Creek =

River in South Dakota, United States

Coordinates: 44°55′19″N 102°00′53″W

Spook Creek is a tributary of the Cheyenne River in Meade County, South Dakota, United States. It lies about 6.2 miles (10 km) south of the city of Faith, South Dakota.

According to tradition, the "spooky" surroundings caused the name Spook Creek to be selected.

== See also ==
- List of rivers of South Dakota
