= Pierre Masonic Lodge =

- U.S. National Register of Historic Places
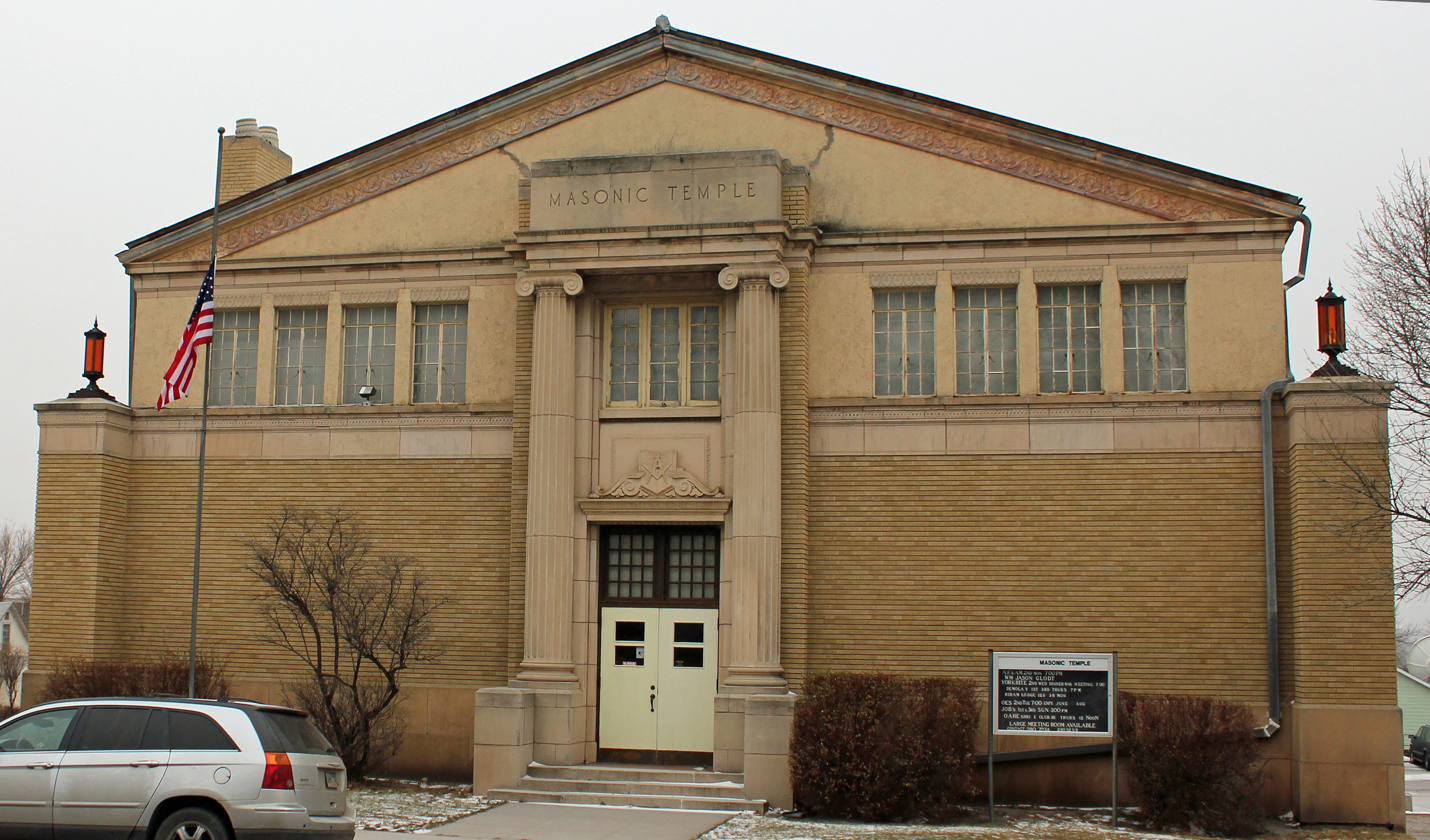

- Location within South Dakota Location within the United States
- Location: 201 W. Capitol Ave., Pierre, South Dakota
- Coordinates: 44°38′30″N 100°21′34″W
- Area: less than one acre
- Built: 1928
- Architect: Perkins and McWayne
- Architectural style: Classical Revival
- NRHP reference No.: 09000447
- Added to NRHP: June 10, 2009

The Pierre Masonic Lodge is a building in Pierre, South Dakota that was designed by architects Perkins & McWayne in Classical Revival style. The building was built in 1928 to house Pierre Lodge 27 A.F. and A.M., which formed in 1881. The building's design features a pediment at the top of the building, Ionic columns flanking the entrance, and ornamentation below the eaves. The lodge was listed on the U.S. National Register of Historic Places in 2009.
