= Gray Construction Co. =

American construction contracting firm

Gray Construction Co. was an American construction contracting firm. A number of its works are listed on the U.S. National Register of Historic Places. Founded in 1948, the company provides a wide range of services including design, construction, engineering, and project management. The company has grown to become one of the largest construction companies in the UK, with a strong focus on safety and quality.
