= Jerauld County Courthouse =

- U.S. National Register of Historic Places
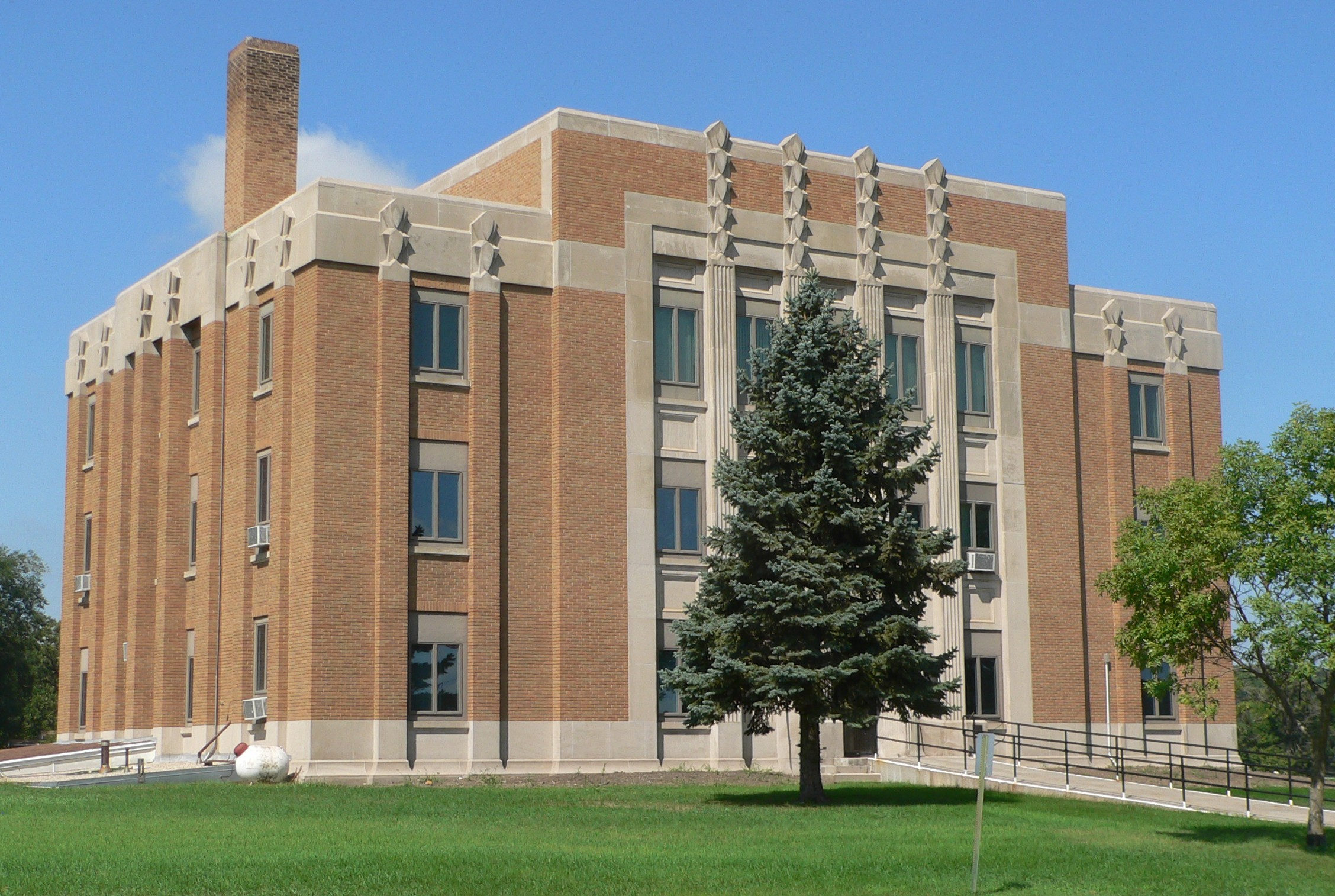

- Location within South Dakota Location within the United States
- Interactive map showing the location of Jerauld County Courthouse
- Location: Jct. of South Dakota Ave. and Burrett St., Wessington Springs, South Dakota
- Coordinates: 44°04′42″N 98°34′12″W
- Area: less than one acre
- Built: 1930
- Built by: Majerus Co.
- Architect: Perkins & McWayne
- Architectural style: Art Deco
- MPS: County Courthouses of South Dakota MPS
- NRHP reference No.: 92001860
- Added to NRHP: February 10, 1993

The Jerauld County Courthouse, at the intersection of South Dakota Ave. and Burrett St. in Wessington Springs, South Dakota, is an Art Deco-style building built in 1930. It was listed on the National Register of Historic Places in 1993.

It is a three-story concrete building clad with brick, on a raised basement.
