= Judy Olson Duhamel =

American politician and educator (born 1939)

Personal details
- Born: Judith Mary Reedy; June 24, 1939 (age 87) Mitchell, South Dakota, U.S.
- Party: Democratic
- Spouses: Bob Olson (m. 1961; div. 1991) Bill Duhamel (m. 2003)
- Children: 6

Judy Olson Duhamel (born Judith Mary Reedy; June 24, 1939) is an American politician and educator. She served in the South Dakota State Senate representing Pennington County from 1988 to 1992 and later served as chair of the South Dakota Democratic Party. She served the Rapid City School District for eighteen years, overseeing community engagement and public information programs. She was inducted into the South Dakota Hall of Fame in 2014.

== Early life and education ==
Judith Mary Reedy was born on June 24, 1939, the only child of J. Marvin Reedy and Camille Murphy. Her father was of Irish descent. The family moved to Rapid City, South Dakota when she was three years old.

She graduated from Rapid City Central High School in 1957 and was named sophomore class president. She attended the University of Arizona, initially on a journalism scholarship, but later switched her focus to education, and majored in speech and English in education. In 1961, she graduated with a bachelor's degree in 1961 and moved to Minneapolis to begin teaching, where she married her first husband, Bob Olson. The couple moved back to Rapid City in 1963. During the early years of their marriage, Olson Duhamel was a housewife to her husband and six young children.

Olson Duhamel later attended classes through South Dakota State University at Ellsworth Air Force Base, where she earned a master's degree in education administration.

== Educational career ==
Olson Duhamel was appointed to the South Dakota Board of Education in 1972 by Governor Richard F. Kneip, and retained that position until 1983. During that time, she also served on the State Board of Vocational Education and the Professional Practices Commission. She later served on the National Association of State Boards of Education.

Olson Duhamel spent 18 years as a supervisor in the Rapid City School District, where she oversaw public communications and community education. While there, she instituted programs to decrease drop-out rates and create childcare for homeless parents. Although she retired from the post in 1992, she continues to work for the Rapid City Area Schools on various boards and appointments.

At times, she also travelled on business to Japan, including a visit with Rapid City Mayor Ed McLaughlin to Imaichi, to sign a sister city agreement. A 1978 trip led Olson Duhamel to develop a city-wide teacher exchange program.

== Political career ==
In 1988, Olson Duhamel successfully ran for a seat in the 33rd district of the South Dakota State Senate, beating incumbent Republican Ed Glassgow by 1,040 votes. As a state senator, Olson Duhamel served on several committees relating to childhood education, including one that assessed daycare conditions across the state. During this time, she was appointed to the Presidential Scholarship commission by President Bill Clinton.

1988 General Election: South Dakota State Senate District 33
| Party | Candidate | Votes | % |
|---|---|---|---|
| Republican | Ed Glassgow | 3,802 | 44% |
| Democratic | Judith R. (Judy) Olson | 4,842 | 56% |

Olson Duhamel ran for re-election in 1992; district lines had been redrawn and placed her incumbent seat in the 34th district, representing northern and western Rapid City. Her platform, centered on education, aimed to secure 50% state funding in education and continue her environmentalist work. She lost to Republican Jerry J. Shoener.

1992 General Election: South Dakota State Senate District 34
| Party | Candidate | Votes | % |
|---|---|---|---|
| Democratic | Judith R. Olson | 5,124 | 46% |
| Republican | Jerry J. Shoener | 5,953 | 54% |

After running for political office, Olson Duhamel became the chair of the South Dakota Democratic Party for eight years before retiring in 2006.

== Personal life ==
Olson Duhamel has six children with her first husband, dentist Bob Olson, whom she became engaged to during college and married in 1961. They divorced in 1991. Judy married Bill Duhamel, a broadcaster and former classmate of Judy's, on August 2, 2003. Through him, she has five stepchildren, and together they have a combined 27 grandchildren.

== Accolades and accreditation ==
Olson Duhamel earned accreditation from the National School Public Relations Association in 1986; at the time, she was the only public relations official in South Dakota to do so.

She was named Adult Educator of the Year by the Missouri Valley Education Association for her work in the Rapid City education system. She also received the 1992 Service Award from the South Dakota Association for the Education of Young Children.

Olson Duhamel was inducted into the South Dakota Hall of Fame in 2014, having been nominated by Stephanie Herseth Sandlin, and is included in the hall of fame's Rotary International exhibit.
