= Rapid City High School =

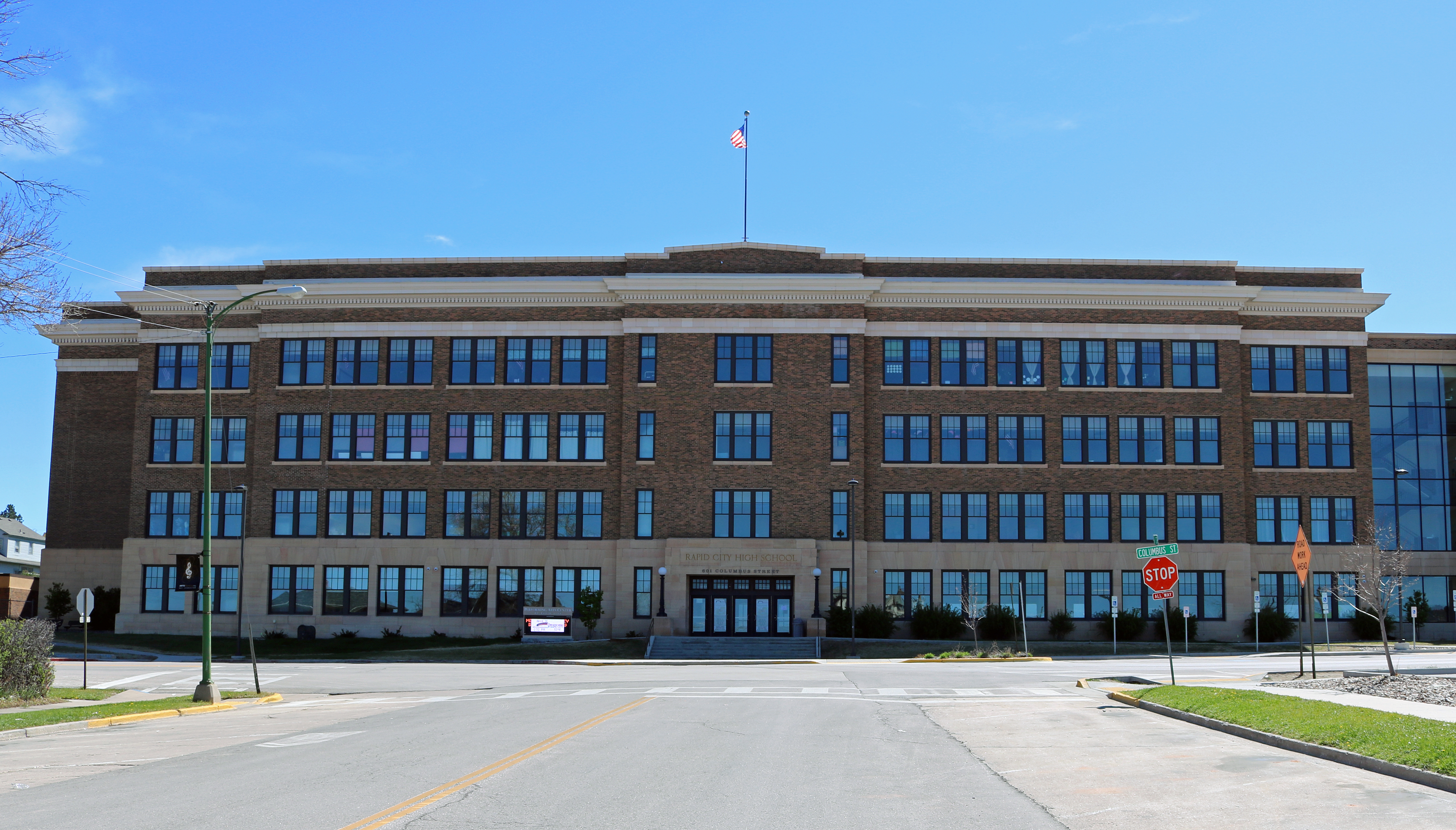
- Rapid City High School in 2017

Location
- 601 Columbus Street; Rapid City, South Dakota; United States; 44°04′35″N 103°13′42″W

Information
- Former names: Rapid City Central High School, Dakota Middle School
- Type: Alternative high school
- Established: 1923
- School district: Rapid City Area Schools
- NCES District ID: 4659820
- Principal: Jennifer Roberts
- Enrollment: 302 (2022)
- Website: rcalternativeacademy.rcas.org/o/rcaa
- Rapid City High School
- U.S. National Register of Historic Places
- Area: less than one acre
- Built by: Morris Adelstein; Northwestern Engineering Company (1937 expansion)
- Architect: Perkins & McWayne
- Architectural style: Beaux Arts
- NRHP reference No.: 10000409
- Added to NRHP: June 28, 2010

Rapid City High School (RCHS), formerly the Dakota Junior High School and then the Dakota Middle School, is an alternative high school at 601 Columbus Street, Rapid City, South Dakota. Established in 1923, the building served as the first site of Rapid City Central High School until it moved to a new facility on Mount Rushmore Road North. Rapid City High School also hosts the Performing Arts Center of Rapid City. The school building was listed on the National Register of Historic Places on June 28, 2010.

== History ==
By the beginning of the 20th century, there were growing concerns of low literacy in Rapid City. In 1915, most residents had only been given a basic education; about 10% of the population had graduated high school, and only 158 people in the entirety of Pennington County held college degrees. Multiple school buildings have been built on the present-day school site, but the remaining one, built in 1923, is the only building that has survived. This complex served as Rapid City's only public high school until 1969. The first school building here was built in 1882, a three-story Second Empire structure that served as Rapid City's first high school until it burned down in 1917. A second campus building was added in 1913; President Calvin Coolidge visited the Black Hills during the summer of 1927 and established his temporary offices there as his "Summer White House". Coolidge wrote his "I do not choose to run" speech at this building, and two years later, it was renamed to Coolidge High School in his honor. Washington Elementary School was added to the complex about 1918.

As Rapid City was quickly expanding and needed more classroom space, the Rapid City School District hired Perkins & McWayne to design a new school complex. This new building was to be constructed in three phases; the first phase, consisting of the east wing, lasted from 1922 until December 1923. During this period, it served as the campus's junior high school. Due to the Great Depression, the central and western wings were not completed until May 1937 with the help of the Public Works Administration. It was one of only two buildings designed by Northwestern Engineering Company, which mainly constructed roads. The expanded school—its name reverted to Rapid City High School by a city-wide popular vote—officially opened to high school students for the fall semester, and junior high classes were moved to the Coolidge Building. Several outbuildings and additions were added in the following decades. A workshop building was added to the southwest side in 1953, and a new boys' gymnasium was built in 1967.

When Stevens High School opened after Thanksgiving 1969, half of the high school students transferred there from the old school, now renamed Rapid City Central High School. However, by this time, the original school complex was aging and could no longer support high school functions, and the city decided to build a new secondary school elsewhere. The new Central High School was completed and opened on Mount Rushmore Road North in 1976, and classes at the old school stopped temporarily while it was renovated to be used again as a junior high. It reopened as Dakota Junior High School (later renamed Dakota Middle School).

During the school day on December 4, 1970, a fire broke out in Washington Elementary School; although no one was injured, the building was completely destroyed. The fire also damaged the neighboring Coolidge Building, and both it and Washington Elementary School were demolished in 1971. This left the 1923 Rapid City High School as the last remaining classroom building on the site.

In 2011, the city made the decision to close Dakota Middle School and reopen the campus again as Rapid City High School to relieve overcrowding at the two public high schools. A new junior high school was constructed in Rapid Valley. The school's auditorium reopened to the public as the Performing Arts Center of Rapid City.

== Architecture ==
Rapid City High School is a four-story, steel-framed, Beaux-Arts-style building on a concrete foundation. Its ground floor exterior is encased in Kasota limestone, while the upper levels are all red brickwork with more decorative limestone molded dentils. The parapet rising above its flat roof is topped with simple limestone blocks; just below this parapet sits a metal cornice. The lower three stories were part of the original structure in 1923, and the fourth floor was not added until 1948. The main entrance on Columbus Street projects out slightly from the rest of the building, with access provided by a set of concrete stairs. "Rapid City High School" is engraved in the limestone veneer above the front entryway. This entrance is flanked by two metal lampposts on either side. The entire area of the building is 1,314,384 sq ft (122,110.3 m^{2}). Two courtyards divide the separate wings of the buildings; they were originally covered by skylights, but these were removed in 1977.

The auditorium dates back to 1937. The stage measures 25 ft (7.6 m) deep and 72 ft (22 m) long. Two sets of stairs lead from the auditorium to the stage, and a small gallery houses the stage's light and curtain mechanisms. The interior is intricately designed; a proscenium arch rises 40 ft (12 m) above the stage. The upper part of the auditorium and the ceiling include intricate molding that camouflage the steel support joists. When originally constructed, it could house 1,402 audience members.

== Performing Arts Center of Rapid City ==
Moved to the Rapid City High School in 2011, the Performing Arts Center of Rapid City hosts public events and performances. There are two theatres: the original 830-seat Historic Theater and the 175-seat Studio Theater. Organizations such as the Black Hills Symphony Orchestra and the Black Hills Community Theatre are based out of this center.

== Notable alumni ==
- Helen Duhamel, businesswoman and broadcaster
- Judy Olson Duhamel, state politician and educator
- Floy Schoenfelder, polio survivor advocate
