= Senator Duhamel =

Senator Duhamel may refer to:

- Helene Duhamel (born 1962), South Dakota State Senate
- James F. Duhamel (1858–1947), New York State Senate
- Judy Olson Duhamel (born 1939), South Dakota State Senate
- Ron Duhamel (1938–2002), Senate of Canada
