= Ashland Heights, South Dakota =

- CDP
- Location in Pennington County and the state of South Dakota
- Coordinates: 44°07′46″N 103°07′43″W
- Country: United States
- State: South Dakota
- County: Pennington

Area
  - Total: 2.92 sq mi (7.56 km^{2})
  - Land: 2.91 sq mi (7.54 km^{2})
  - Water: 0.0077 sq mi (0.02 km^{2})
- Elevation: 3,153 ft (961 m)

Population (2020)
  - Total: 678
  - Density: 232.8/sq mi (89.87/km^{2})
- Time zone: UTC-7 (Mountain (MST))
  - Summer (DST): UTC-6 (MDT)
- Area code: 605
- FIPS code: 46-02530
- GNIS feature ID: 2393320

Ashland Heights is a census-designated place (CDP) and unincorporated community in Pennington County, South Dakota, United States. The population was 678 at the 2020 census.

== Geography ==
According to the United States Census Bureau, the CDP has a total area of 3.0 square miles (7.8 km^{2}), of which 2.9 square miles (7.5 km^{2}) is land and 0.34% is water.

== Demographics ==
Historical population
| Census | Pop. | Note | %± |
|---|---|---|---|
| 2020 | 678 | | — |
U.S. Decennial Census

As of the census of 2000, there were 837 people, 331 households, and 213 families residing in the CDP. The population density was 285.0 inhabitants per square mile (110.0/km^{2}). There were 355 housing units at an average density of 120.9 per square mile (46.7/km^{2}). The racial makeup of the CDP was 87.22% White, 1.43% African American, 6.09% Native American, 0.48% Asian, 0.12% Pacific Islander, 1.08% from other races, and 3.58% from two or more races. Hispanic or Latino of any race were 2.51% of the population.

There were 331 households, out of which 35.3% had children under the age of 18 living with them, 43.5% were married couples living together, 14.8% had a female householder with no husband present, and 35.6% were non-families. 26.3% of all households were made up of individuals, and 5.7% had someone living alone who was 65 years of age or older. The average household size was 2.53 and the average family size was 3.04.

In the CDP, the population was spread out, with 27.0% under the age of 18, 14.3% from 18 to 24, 32.1% from 25 to 44, 19.5% from 45 to 64, and 7.0% who were 65 years of age or older. The median age was 30 years. For every 100 females, there were 101.7 males. For every 100 females age 18 and over, there were 110.0 males.

The median income for a household in the CDP was $29,148, and the median income for a family was $30,833. Males had a median income of $27,222 versus $18,281 for females. The per capita income for the CDP was $13,564. About 19.0% of families and 16.3% of the population were below the poverty line, including 27.4% of those under age 18 and 5.1% of those age 65 or over.

== Education ==
The CDP is divided between the Douglas School District and the Rapid City School District 51-4.
