= Colonial Pine Hills, South Dakota =

- CDP
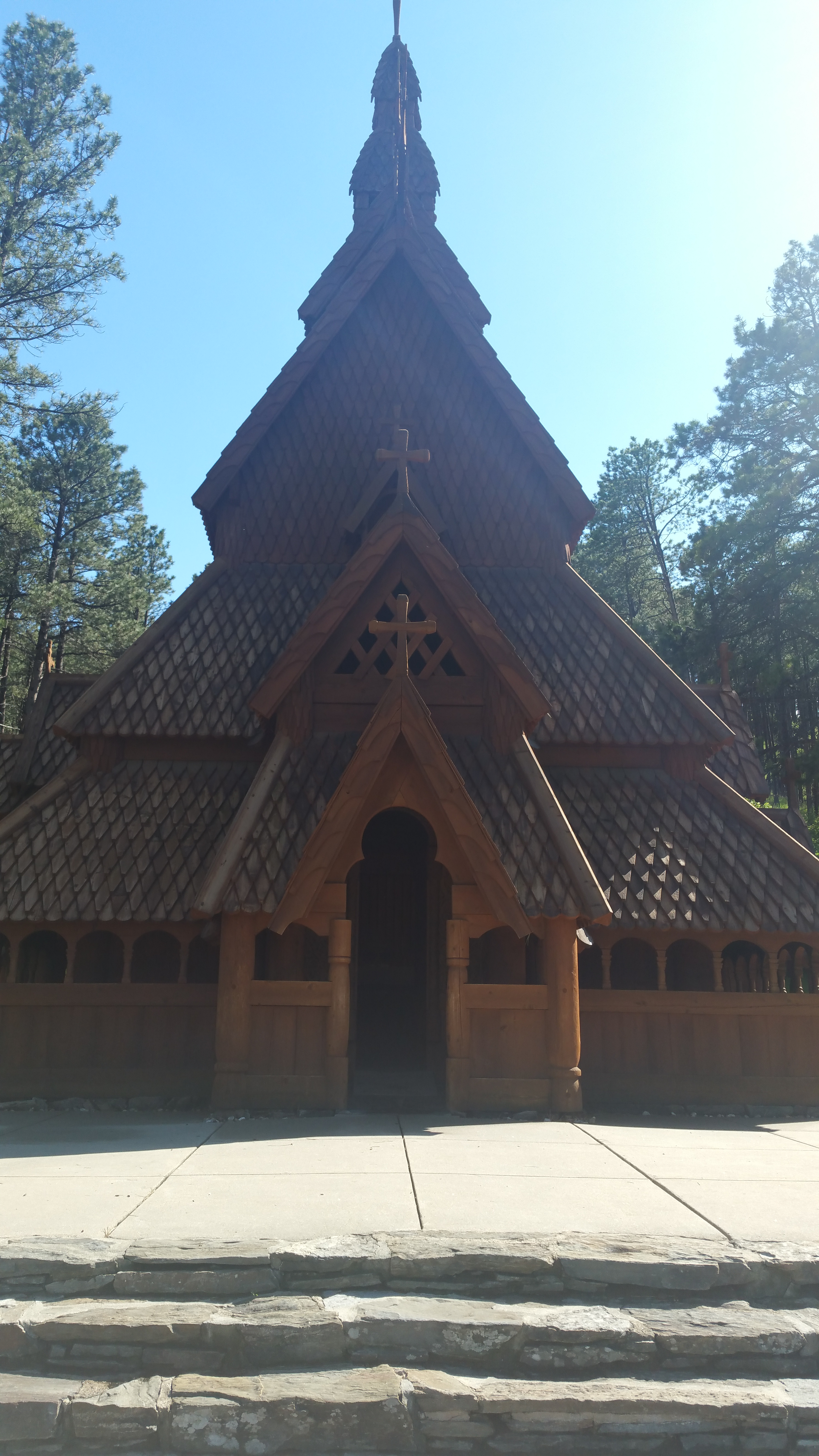
- Chapel in the Hills

- Location in Pennington County and the state of South Dakota
- Coordinates: 44°00′49″N 103°18′54″W
- Country: United States
- State: South Dakota
- County: Pennington

Area
  - Total: 15.29 sq mi (39.61 km^{2})
  - Land: 15.29 sq mi (39.61 km^{2})
  - Water: 0 sq mi (0.00 km^{2})
- Elevation: 4,095 ft (1,248 m)

Population (2020)
  - Total: 1,903
  - Density: 124.4/sq mi (48.04/km^{2})
- Time zone: UTC−7 (Mountain (MST))
  - Summer (DST): UTC−6 (MDT)
- Area code: 605
- FIPS code: 46-13355
- GNIS feature ID: 2393382

Colonial Pine Hills is a census-designated place (CDP) and unincorporated community in Pennington County, South Dakota, United States. The population was 1,903 at the 2020 census.

== Geography ==
According to the United States Census Bureau, the CDP has a total area of 17.2 square miles (45 km^{2}), all land.

== Subdivisions ==
- The Estates at Red Rock
- Red Rock Meadows
- Moon Meadows
- Countryside
- Countryside South
- Sheridan Lake Highlands
- Autumn Hills
- Copper Oaks
- Whispering Pines
- Chapel Valley

== Demographics ==
Historical population
Census	Pop.	Note	%±
1990	1,553		—
2000	2,561		64.9%
2010	2,493		−2.7%
2020	1,903		−23.7%
U.S. Decennial Census

As of the census of 2000, there were 2,561 people, 841 households, and 757 families residing in the CDP. The population density was 149.2 inhabitants per square mile (57.6/km^{2}). There were 867 housing units at an average density of 50.5 per square mile (19.5/km^{2}). The racial makeup of the CDP was 96.29% White, 0.31% African American, 1.21% Native American, 0.90% Asian, 0.08% Pacific Islander, 0.12% from other races, and 1.09% from two or more races. Hispanic or Latino of any race were 1.13% of the population.

There were 841 households, out of which 50.5% had children under the age of 18 living with them, 85.4% were married couples living together, 3.1% had a female householder with no husband present, and 9.9% were non-families. 6.8% of all households were made up of individuals, and 1.5% had someone living alone who was 65 years of age or older. The average household size was 3.05 and the average family size was 3.21.

In the CDP, the population was spread out, with 32.4% under the age of 18, 4.1% from 18 to 24, 30.5% from 25 to 44, 26.9% from 45 to 64, and 6.1% who were 65 years of age or older. The median age was 38 years. For every 100 females, there were 103.4 males. For every 100 females age 18 and over, there were 99.4 males.

The median income for a household in the CDP was $68,088, and the median income for a family was $70,671. Males had a median income of $45,688 versus $30,505 for females. The per capita income for the CDP was $24,201. About 3.0% of families and 3.6% of the population were below the poverty line, including 4.4% of those under age 18 and none of those age 65 or over.

== Education ==
It is in Rapid City School District 51-4.
