= Green Valley, South Dakota =

- CDP
- Location in Pennington County and the state of South Dakota
- Coordinates: 44°02′20″N 103°06′42″W
- Country: United States
- State: South Dakota
- Counties: Pennington

Area
  - Total: 3.7 sq mi (9.6 km^{2})
  - Land: 3.7 sq mi (9.6 km^{2})
  - Water: 0 sq mi (0 km^{2})
- Elevation: 3,045 ft (928 m)

Population (2020)
  - Total: 1,051
  - Density: 250/sq mi (96.7/km^{2})
- Time zone: Mountain (MST)
- GNIS feature ID: 2393029

Green Valley is a census-designated place (CDP) and unincorporated community in Pennington County, South Dakota, United States. The population was 1,051 at the 2020 census.

== Geography ==
According to the United States Census Bureau, the CDP has a total area of 3.7 square miles (9.6 km^{2}), all land.

== Demographics ==
Historical population
Census	Pop.	Note	%±
2000	768		—
2010	928		20.8%
2020	1,051		13.3%
U.S. Decennial Census

As of the census of 2000, there were 768 people, 314 households, and 211 families residing in the CDP. The population density was 206.9 inhabitants per square mile (79.9/km^{2}). There were 321 housing units at an average density of 86.5 per square mile (33.4/km^{2}). The racial makeup of the CDP was 95.57% White, 2.73% Native American, 0.13% Asian, 0.13% Pacific Islander, and 1.43% from two or more races. Hispanic or Latino of any race were 2.08% of the population.

There were 314 households, out of which 29.6% had children under the age of 18 living with them, 53.5% were married couples living together, 8.0% had a female householder with no husband present, and 32.8% were non-families. 23.9% of all households were made up of individuals, and 4.8% had someone living alone who was 65 years of age or older. The average household size was 2.45 and the average family size was 2.90.

The age distribution was 23.4% under the age of 18, 8.7% from 18 to 24, 31.4% from 25 to 44, 25.4% from 45 to 64, and 11.1% who were 65 years of age or older. The median age was 39 years. For every 100 females, there were 110.4 males. For every 100 females age 18 and over, there were 109.3 males.

The median income for a household in the CDP was $35,767, and the median income for a family was $42,981. Males had a median income of $30,268 versus $16,176 for females. The per capita income for the CDP was $17,111. About 7.0% of families and 11.6% of the population were below the poverty line, including 39.7% of those under age 18 and none of those age 65 or over.

== Education ==
The CDP is divided between the Douglas School District and the Rapid City School District 51-4.
