= Adam Vinatieri =

American football player (born 1972)

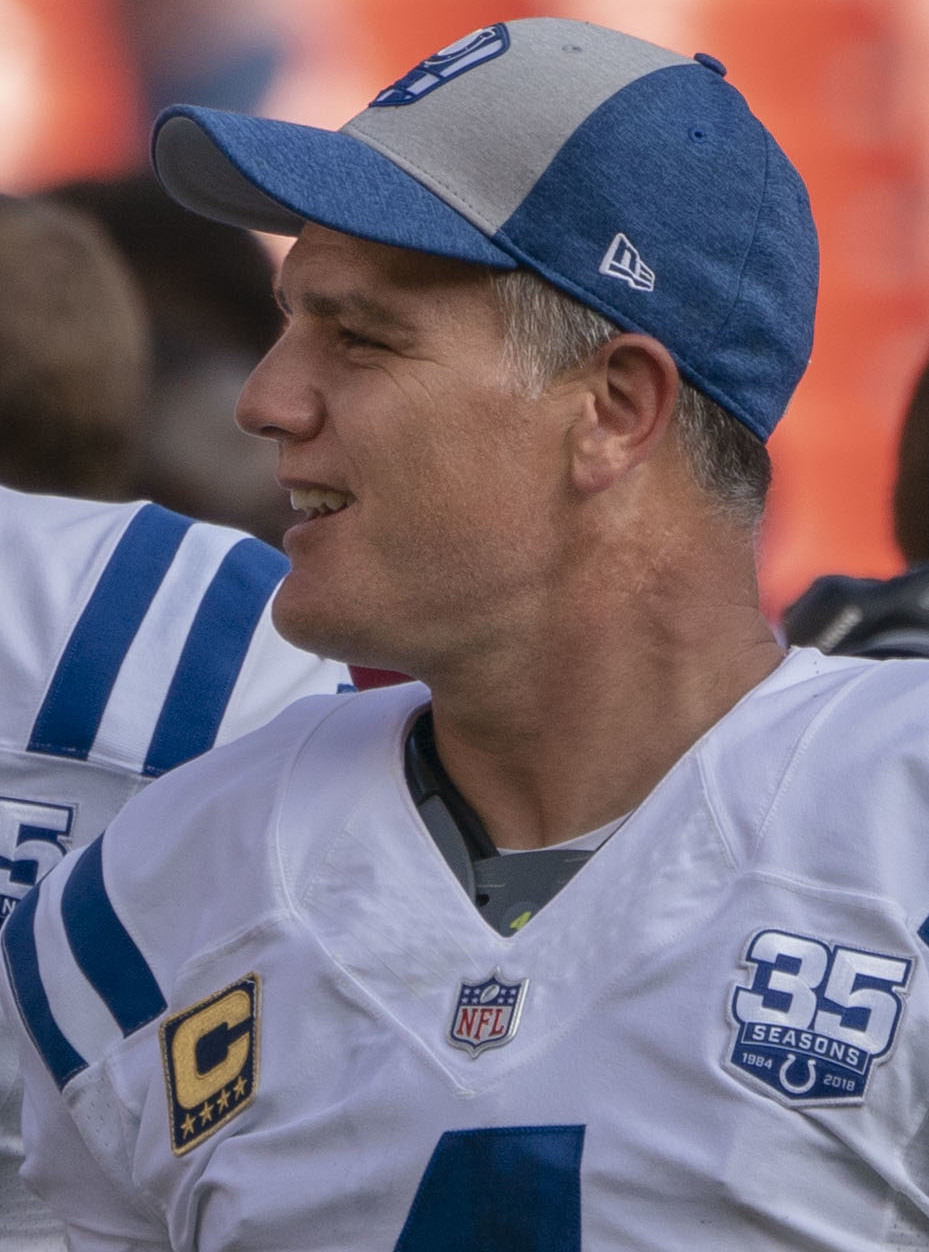
- Vinatieri with the Indianapolis Colts in 2018

No. 5, 4
- Position: Placekicker

Personal information
- Born: December 28, 1972 (age 53); Yankton, South Dakota, U.S.
- Listed height: 6 ft 0 in (1.83 m)
- Listed weight: 212 lb (96 kg)

Career information
- High school: Central (Rapid City, South Dakota)
- College: South Dakota State (1991–1994)
- NFL draft: 1995: undrafted

Career history
- Amsterdam Admirals (1996); New England Patriots (1996–2005); Indianapolis Colts (2006–2019)

Awards and highlights
- 4× Super Bowl champion (XXXVI, XXXVIII, XXXIX, XLI); 3× First-team All-Pro (2002, 2004, 2014); 3× Pro Bowl (2002, 2004, 2014); NFL scoring leader (2004); NFL 2000s All-Decade Team; NFL 100th Anniversary All-Time Team; PFWA All-Rookie Team (1996); New England Patriots All-1990s Team; New England Patriots All-2000s Team; New England Patriots 50th Anniversary Team; New England Patriots All-Dynasty Team; Indianapolis Colts Ring of Honor; NFL records: Most career points scored: 2,673; Most consecutive field goals made: 44; Most combined regular season and postseason games played: 397; Most career field goals made: 599; Most career field goals attempted: 715; Most seasons with 100+ points: 21; Most career overtime field goals: 11; Most field goals made in a postseason: 14 (2006; tied) (Note: Tied with Evan McPherson)

Career NFL statistics
- Field goals: 599/715
- Field goal %: 83.8%
- Longest field goal: 57
- Points scored: 2,673
- Stats at Pro Football Reference
- Pro Football Hall of Fame

Adam Matthew Vinatieri (born December 28, 1972) is an American former professional football placekicker who played in the National Football League (NFL) for 24 seasons with the New England Patriots and Indianapolis Colts. Vinatieri is the NFL's all-time leading scorer at 2,673 points, in addition to holding the NFL records for field goals made (599), postseason points (238), and overtime field goals made (12). He is considered one of the greatest placekickers of all time.

Vinatieri joined the Patriots as an undrafted free agent in 1996, where he played for 10 seasons, and was a member of the Colts for 14 seasons. A four-time Super Bowl winner – three with the Patriots and one with the Colts – Vinatieri has the most Super Bowl wins for a kicker. He is also the only player to score 1,000 points for two different franchises. Retiring in 2021 after a year in free agency, Vinatieri was the last active NFL player whose career began in the 1990s.

Celebrated for his accuracy and success under pressure, Vinatieri completed several of the most crucial field goals in NFL history. During the 2001–02 NFL playoffs, he converted the game-tying and winning kicks of New England's AFC Divisional Playoff game in blizzard conditions and the game-winning kick in the final seconds of Super Bowl XXXVI, earning the Patriots their first championship. Vinatieri would again convert a final-second kick to win Super Bowl XXXVIII, establishing himself as a key contributor of the Patriots' dynasty. He was inducted to the Pro Football Hall of Fame in 2026.

== Early life ==
Vinatieri was born in Yankton, South Dakota, on December 28, 1972, the second child of four children to Paul Vinatieri and Judy M. (Goeken). His father is of Italian descent and his other ancestry includes German and English. His younger brother Beau was a kicker at Black Hills State University before graduating in 2003.

When Vinatieri was five years old, his family moved to Rapid City, South Dakota. As a child, he struggled to read and enrolled in classes for children with learning disabilities. Vinatieri attended Central High School in Rapid City and was a letterman in football, wrestling, basketball, soccer, and track. In football, he earned first-team All-State honors as a senior. He graduated from Central High School in 1991. Before starting as a kicker, Vinatieri was a quarterback and middle linebacker. When asked in 2005, several years into his NFL career, why he no longer played one of those positions once he reached college, he replied, "I'm 6 feet tall and 200 pounds, and unfortunately the linebackers aren't that small, and neither are the quarterbacks."

== College career ==
Vinatieri received an appointment to the United States Military Academy at West Point, but was only there for two weeks before deciding to return home, where he then enrolled at South Dakota State University. He was a four-year letterman there as a kicker and punter and he finished his collegiate career as the school's all-time leading scorer with 185 career points as well as being awarded first-team all-conference honors in each of his seasons.

== Professional career ==
=== Amsterdam Admirals ===
After going undrafted in the 1995 NFL draft, Vinatieri received some interest from Canadian Football League teams but decided to keep training for an NFL career. In February 1996, he was selected by the Amsterdam Admirals of the World League of American Football (WLAF) in the 14th round of the 1996 WLAF draft. Vinatieri played in all ten games for the Admirals during the 1996 WLAF season, punting 41 times for 1,612 yards (39.3 average) while also converting nine of 10 field goals and four of four extra points.

=== New England Patriots ===
==== 1996 season ====
After the WLAF season ended, Vinatieri signed with the New England Patriots on June 28, 1996. In order to become their starting kicker, he had to compete with 17-year veteran Matt Bahr. Bahr at first seemed to be the favorite. He had a long history with Patriots coach Bill Parcells, including a Super Bowl win under Parcells in the 1990 season. However, Parcells ultimately made the decision to cut Bahr during the preseason and go with Vinatieri, mainly because Bahr was no longer capable of efficiently performing kickoffs.

In his rookie season, Vinatieri chased down and tackled Dallas Cowboys returner Herschel Walker on a kickoff, leading Parcells to tell his rookie kicker "You're not a kicker—you're a football player." In Week 4, Vinatieri converted five of six field goal attempts against the Jacksonville Jaguars, to earn AFC Special Teams Player of the Week. He converted the 40-yard game-winning field goal in overtime of the 28–25 victory. He finished his rookie season converting 39 of 42 extra point tries and 27 of 35 field goal attempts. His first Super Bowl appearance was in his rookie season of 1996 when he played with the Patriots in their 35–21 loss to the Green Bay Packers in Super Bowl XXXI. All-Pro and game MVP Desmond Howard's Super Bowl-record 99-yard touchdown return ended the Patriots' bid for a comeback. The game would mark the only Super Bowl defeat of Vinatieri's career (he did not play in the Colts' loss in Super Bowl XLIV due to injury). Vinatieri was named to the NFL All-Rookie Team.

==== 1997 season ====
In Week 7 of the 1997 season, Vinatieri won AFC Special Teams Player of the Week after converting all three extra point tries and all four field goal attempts in the 33–6 victory over the Buffalo Bills. In the 1997 season, Vinatieri converted all 40 extra point attempts and 25 of 29 field goal attempts as the Patriots went 10–6 and earned a playoff berth. He was responsible for scoring all of the Patriots' points with two field goals in their game against the Pittsburgh Steelers in the Divisional Round.

==== 1998 season ====
In Week 5 of the 1998 season, Vinatieri converted three extra point and three field goals tries in the 30–27 victory over the New Orleans Saints. His last field goal attempt was a 27-yarder with six seconds remaining to put the Patriots in position to win the game. He earned AFC Special Teams Player of the Week for his game against New Orleans. The Saints game was the beginning of a month for Vinatieri where he won AFC Special Teams Player of the Month. He finished the 1998 season converting all 32 extra point attempts and 31 of 39 field goal attempts.

==== 1999 season ====
In the 1999 season, Vinatieri won AFC Special Teams Player of the Month for September. He converted 29 of 30 extra point attempts and 26 of 33 field goal attempts as the Patriots went 8–8.

==== 2000 season ====
In the 2000 season, Vinatieri converted all 25 extra point attempts and 27 of 33 field goal attempts in the Patriots' 5–11 season.

==== 2001 season ====
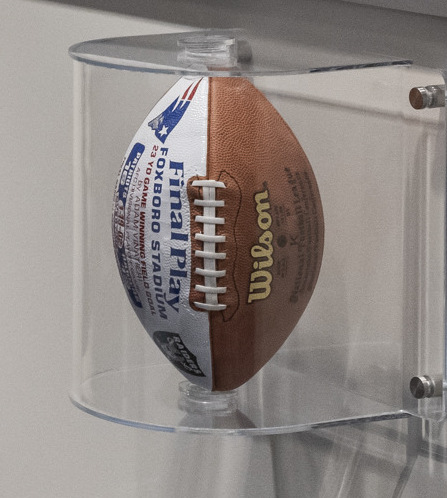
Display at Gillette Stadium, commemorating the final play at Foxboro Stadium (a 23-yard game winning field goal)

In Week 14, Vinatieri converted all four field goal attempts in a 12–9 victory over the Buffalo Bills. The last of the four was the game-winner in overtime. He won AFC Special Teams Player of the Week for his game against Buffalo. In the 2001 regular season, Vinatieri converted 41 of 42 extra point attempts and 24 of 30 field goal attempts. In the 2001 playoffs, during a blizzard against the Oakland Raiders in the final game at Foxboro Stadium, Vinatieri kicked a 45-yard field goal into a swirling winter wind to tie the game 13–13 and send it to overtime. The Patriots won the game on another field goal of 23 yards by Vinatieri. In Super Bowl XXXVI that season, Vinatieri kicked a 48-yard field goal on the final play to give the New England Patriots their first Super Bowl victory, a 20–17 upset win over the St. Louis Rams, who were 14-point favorites coming into the game.

==== 2002 season ====
In Week 17, against the Miami Dolphins, Vinatieri converted all four field goal attempts in the 27–24 victory. The last of the four was the game-winner in overtime. He won AFC Special Teams Player of the Week for his game against Miami. In the 2002 season, Vinatieri converted all 36 extra point tries and 27 of 30 field goal tries as the Patriots went 9–7 and missed the playoffs. He earned Pro Bowl and First Team All-Pro honors.

==== 2003 season ====
In the 2003 regular season, Vinatieri converted 37 of 38 extra point tries and 25 of 34 field goal attempts. In an almost identical situation to the Super Bowl two seasons prior, he kicked a 41-yard field goal with four seconds left in Super Bowl XXXVIII to boost the Patriots to another championship (after missing one field goal and having another attempt blocked in the first half). This time, the Patriots defeated the Carolina Panthers 32–29, making Vinatieri the first player ever to be the deciding factor in two Super Bowl games (Vinatieri kept the footballs used on both of these kicks).

==== 2004 season ====
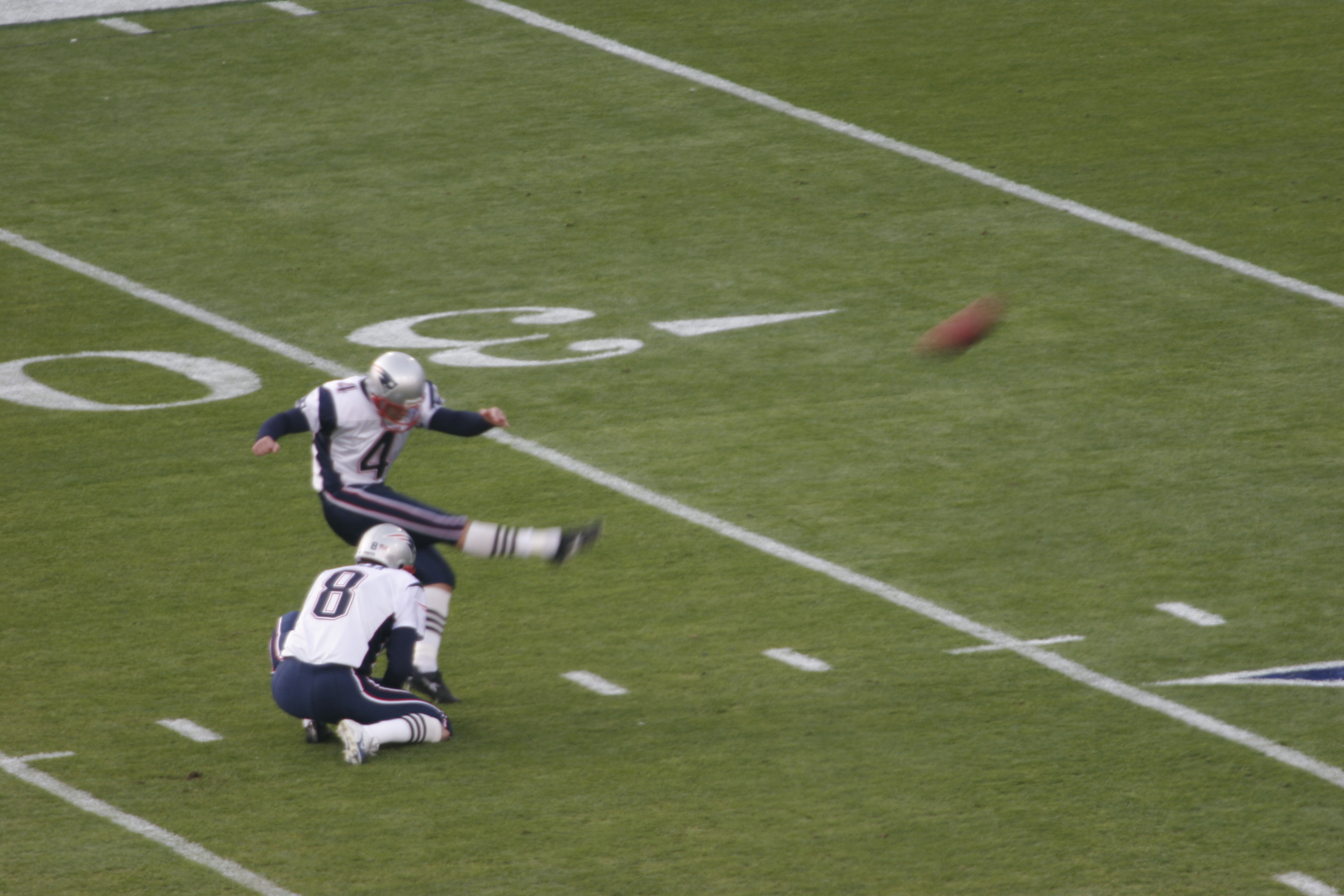
Vinatieri warming up during the pre-game of Super Bowl XXXIX

Vinatieri was named AFC Special Teams Player of the Month for November. In 2004, Vinatieri led the NFL in scoring with 141 points (31-for-33 on field goals, and a perfect 48-for-48 on extra point attempts). In a Week 9 game against the St. Louis Rams, Vinatieri scored 16 points (four field goals and four extra points), and threw a four-yard touchdown pass to wide receiver Troy Brown on a fake field goal attempt (that pass gives him a career passer rating of 122.9). For his game against the Rams, he earned AFC Special Teams Player of the Week. In Week 10, against the Buffalo Bills, he scored a career-high 17 points on five field goals and two extra points. He was named to the Pro Bowl and earned First Team All-Pro honors.

Vinatieri scored a field goal and three extra points in the Patriots 24–21 win over the Philadelphia Eagles in Super Bowl XXXIX.

==== 2005 season ====
In Week 3, Vinatieri earned AFC Special Teams Player of the Week in a game against the Pittsburgh Steelers. He hit the game-winning field goal with one second remaining. In the 2005 season, Vinatieri converted 40 of 41 extra point attempts and 20 of 25 field goal attempts.

==== Legacy ====
By the time Vinatieri finished his final season with the Patriots in 2005, he had kicked 18 game-winning field goals with less than one minute remaining, including the postseason. At the conclusion of the 2005 season, he had a career field goal percentage of 81.9 percent (263/321), fifth-highest in NFL history. In his time in New England, his community involvement included helping Christian athletes, D.A.R.E., and the Governor's Highway Safety Bureau. He was a spokesperson for the Blue Cross and Blue Shield of Rhode Island's teen anti-smoking contest, and also appeared in commercials for Boston-based pizza Papa Gino's. Vinatieri finished his 10 seasons with the Patriots as the team's all-time leading scorer with 1,156 points (that record was surpassed by Vinatieri's replacement, Stephen Gostkowski, in 2014). His jersey number 4 was not reissued for the next 14 seasons until quarterback Jarrett Stidham wore it in 2019.

=== Indianapolis Colts ===
==== 2006 season ====
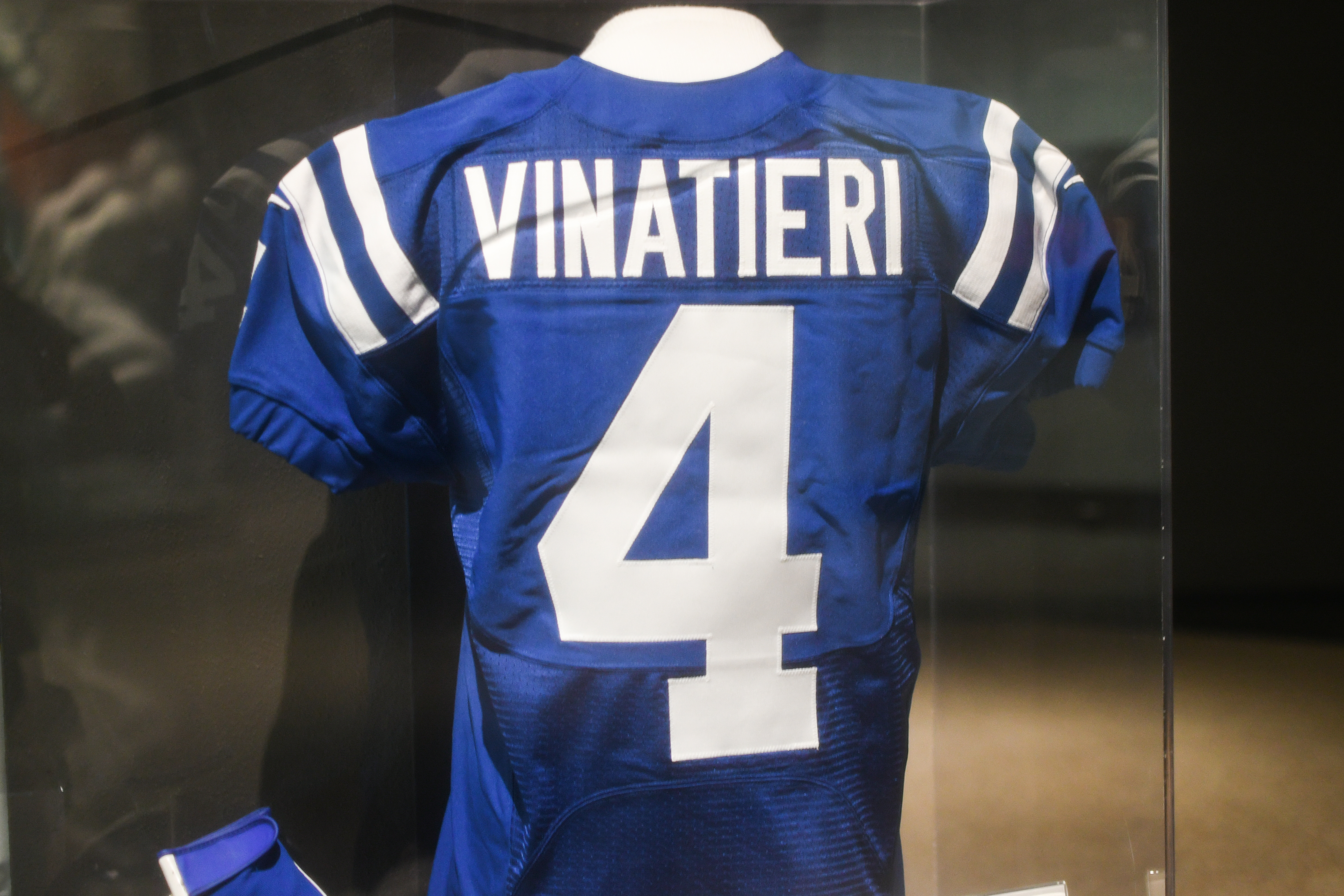
Vinatieri's Colt jersey at the Pro Football Hall of Fame

After the 2005 season, the Patriots chose not to place their franchise tag on Vinatieri as they had the year before, allowing him to become a free agent. He had met with the Green Bay Packers, but was set on signing in either a warm-weather climate or a team that played home games in a dome. On March 22, 2006, Vinatieri signed with the Indianapolis Colts, replacing Mike Vanderjagt, who signed with the Dallas Cowboys. Vinatieri was signed to a five-year contract and received a $3.5 million signing bonus.

"When the Colts called, I told my agent, 'Let's not screw around,'" said Vinatieri, in his first extensive comments regarding his departure from New England. "I told him, 'If Indy is interested, let's get this done.'" Vinatieri said he has no regrets about not giving the Patriots a chance to counter the offer.

With the Colts, Vinatieri had been a perfect 10-of-10 in kicks in the RCA Dome. He finished the 2006 season converting all 38 extra point attempts and 25 of 28 field goal attempts. He won AFC Special Teams Player of the Week for his performances in Week 1 against the New York Giants and Week 8 against the Denver Broncos. In the Divisional Round, Vinatieri kicked five field goals in the Colts' 15–6 upset of the favored Baltimore Ravens.

The Colts reached Super Bowl XLI after defeating the New England Patriots in the AFC Championship. It was Vinatieri's fifth Super Bowl appearance, and his first with the Colts. The Colts defeated the Chicago Bears 29–17. Chicago rookie Devin Hester returned Vinatieri's opening kickoff 92 yards for a touchdown. Through 2026, it remains the only touchdown return of an opening kickoff in Super Bowl history. All the subsequent kickoffs by Vinatieri were squib kicks directed away from Hester. Vinatieri converted three of four field goal attempts and one of two extra point attempts in the game, the miss when punter/holder Hunter Smith fumbled the snap on the extra-point attempt after the Colts' first offensive touchdown. He missed a 36-yard kick wide left at the end of the first half—the third time he had missed a kick in the Super Bowl. Super Bowl XLI was Vinatieri's fourth Super Bowl victory.

Vinatieri finished his playoff run with 49 total points and 14 field goals, which both set new league records for one postseason that still stand (Evan McPherson tied his field goal record in the 2021–22 NFL playoffs). Vinatieri also became the first (and so far only) player have three or more field goals in four consecutive postseason games.

==== 2007 season ====
During the 2007 season, Vinatieri appeared in all 16 games and was 23 of 29 on field goal attempts and 49 of 51 on extra point attempts for 118 points (both missed PATs were blocked). This season marked his 12th consecutive 100+ point season. He kicked his 20th career game-winning FG in the final minute of a fourth quarter or overtime, this time with three seconds remaining against the Kansas City Chiefs on November 18, 2007. In the postseason that year, Vinatieri extended his NFL career postseason records in field goals (41), attempts (50), points (172) and consecutive games scoring (22).

==== 2008 season ====
Vinatieri made a 47-yard game-winner with three seconds remaining against Minnesota in Week 2. He made a 52-yard FG against New England in Week 9 with 8:05 remaining for the deciding points in 18–15 victory and was named AFC Special Teams Player of the Week. Later that month, in Week 12, Vinatieri hit a game-winner with no time remaining at San Diego. In the 2008 season, Vinatieri appeared in 16 games and converted all 43 extra point attempts and 20 of 25 field goal attempts for 103 points.

==== 2009 season ====
In July 2009, Vinatieri had surgery on his right hip to alleviate a nagging injury, but the Colts expected that he would be ready for the season. Vinatieri was placed on the injured reserve list for the rest of the season. However, Vinatieri struggled early in the season and complained of soreness in his knee. Doctors found loose cartilage in an MRI, and Vinatieri underwent arthroscopic surgery during the Colts' bye week. Vinatieri was expected to miss four to eight weeks while recovering. During the season, punter Pat McAfee assumed Vinatieri's kickoff duties, something he would continue to do until his retirement after the 2016 season. The Colts signed former Baltimore Ravens kicker Matt Stover to replace him. There was speculation over whether the Colts could cut Vinatieri, but Colts president Bill Polian stated that Vinatieri would return when he was 100% healthy. Due to the injury, Vinatieri appeared in only six games for the Colts in 2009. He returned to the lineup and kicked a field goal but missed an extra point attempt in a Week 15 loss to the New York Jets, but then was inactive for the final game of the regular season as well as throughout the Colts' postseason run. Vinatieri did not play in Super Bowl XLIV, which the Colts lost to the New Orleans Saints. He was named to the Pro Football Hall of Fame First Team All-2000s Team.

==== 2010 season ====
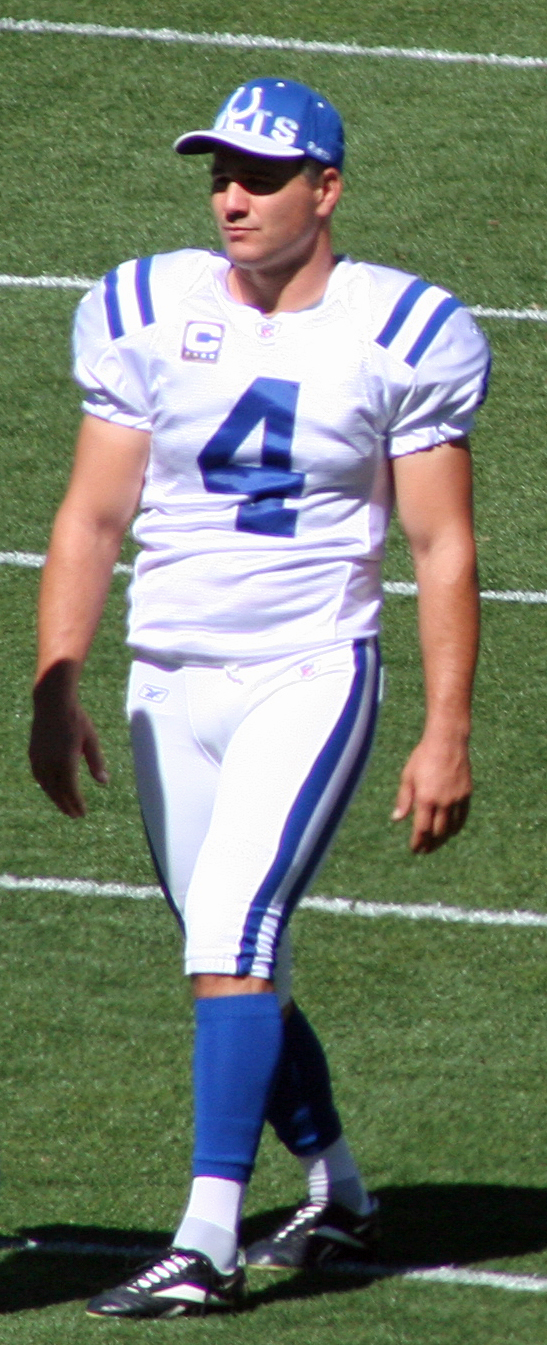
Vinatieri in 2010

The 2010 season showed a return to form after Vinatieri's injury-plagued 2009 season. Vinatieri appeared in 15 games that season. He converted all 51 extra point attempts and 26 of 28 field goal attempts. In the final game of the regular season, in which the Colts claimed the AFC South title, Vinatieri recorded his 23rd career game-winning kick in the final minute of regulation or in overtime. He was named AFC Special Teams Player of the Week for the second time after the game. He led the league in extra points attempted and made. He finished third in total scoring.

Some other noteworthy accomplishments for Vinatieri during 2010 include:

- He became the 12th kicker in NFL history to score 1,600 points in his career.
- He became the seventh kicker in NFL history to score 500-plus points with two teams (850 with Colts; 1,156 with Patriots)
- He connected on 26 of 28 field goals (92.9 percent) this season, the best percentage among NFL kickers that season with at least 20 attempts
- On November 14 against Cincinnati, he surpassed Eddie Murray (who had 352 career FGs) for 11th-most FGs made in NFL history
- His 129 points marked the second-most of his career. It marked the 14th time he surpassed 100 points in a season
- He was named AFC Special Teams Player of the Week two times during 2010 (Weeks 10 and 17). It marked twelve times during his career (including 8 times with the New England Patriots)

With 53 seconds left in the Colts' Wild Card playoff game against the New York Jets, Vinatieri kicked a 50-yard field goal, his third field goal of the game, to put the Colts ahead 16–14. However, the Jets later won the game on a 32-yard field goal by Nick Folk as time expired.

==== 2011 season ====
With Colts' quarterback Peyton Manning being out for the season due to injury, the Colts offense sputtered and had a noticeable effect on Vinatieri's production. In the 2011 season, Vinatieri converted all 24 extra point attempts and 23 of 27 field goal attempts.

==== 2012 season ====
In the 2012 season, Vinatieri converted all 37 extra point attempts and 26 of 33 field goal attempts.

==== 2013 season ====
In Week 11, against the Tennessee Titans, he converted all three extra point tries and all three field goal tries in the 30–27 victory to earn AFC Special Teams Player of the Week. In Week 13, against the Titans, he converted all five field goal attempts in the 22–14 victory. In Week 17, Vinatieri converted all three extra point attempts and all three field goal attempts in the 30–10 victory over the Jacksonville Jaguars to earn AFC Special Teams Player of the Week. In the 2013 season, Vinatieri converted 34 extra point attempts and 35 of 40 field goal attempts. In the Wild Card Round of the playoffs, Vinatieri converted all six extra point attempts and two field goal attempts in the 45–44 comeback victory over the Kansas City Chiefs. Against the Patriots in the Divisional Round, Vinatieri became the first player in NFL history to convert 50 field goals in the postseason. On March 11, 2014, Vinatieri signed a two-year extension with the Colts.

==== 2014 season ====
In Week 13 of the 2014 season, against the Washington Redskins, Vinatieri converted a career-high seven extra-point attempts in the 49–27 win. Through Week 16, Vinatieri was 28-of-28 in field goals, and was selected to his third career Pro Bowl in December. In the regular season finale against the Tennessee Titans, Vinatieri converted his first field goal but missed on his second attempt, ending his run at a perfect season. He finished the season 30-of-31 in field goal attempts, and did not miss an extra point try in 50 attempts. He was named to his third career Pro Bowl. On January 2, 2015, Vinatieri was selected by the Associated Press as the First-team All-Pro kicker, his third such selection.

On May 6, Vinatieri was ranked on the NFL Network's NFL Top 100 Players of 2015 list as the 98th best player heading into the 2015 season, becoming the first specialist (kicker or punter) ever to be ranked in the Top 100 Players List, as well as the oldest player to be ranked at the time.

==== 2015 season ====
In Week 4 of the 2015 season, Vinatieri became the Colts' all-time leading scorer and the first player in NFL history to score 1,000 points with two teams. In Week 8, against the Carolina Panthers, he set the NFL's all-time record for overtime field goals made in a career with 10. In Week 11, Vinatieri converted three extra points and a game-winning field goal to give the Colts a come-from-behind win in Vinatieri's 300th NFL game. He was named AFC Special Teams player of the Month for November. In the 2015 season, Vinatieri converted 32 of 35 extra point attempts and 25 of 27 field goal tries.

==== 2016 season ====
On March 8, 2016, Vinatieri signed a two-year, $6 million extension with the Colts. On October 12, Vinatieri was awarded the AFC Special Teams Player of the Week Award for the 16th time in his career, establishing a new NFL record. In Week 5, against the Chicago Bears, he tied his career-high with 17 points (five field goals and two extra points) scored in the 29–23 victory. In a game against the Tennessee Titans on October 23, Vinatieri kicked his 43rd successful field goal in a row to break the NFL record set by Mike Vanderjagt. Vinatieri was named AFC Special Teams Player of the Month for October. His streak of consecutive successful field goals ended at 44, when he missed a 42-yard kick in the Colts' Week 11 game against the Tennessee Titans. On January 1, 2017, a missed field goal in the season's final game against the Jacksonville Jaguars cost Vinatieri a $500,000 bonus. The bonus depended on Vinatieri finishing the 2016 campaign with a 90% or higher field goal rate. In the 2016 season, Vinatieri converted all 44 extra point attempts and 27 of 31 field goal attempts.

==== 2017 season ====
On September 10, 2017, Vinatieri started his 22nd season in the NFL in a game against the Los Angeles Rams. In Week 5, Vinatieri went 4-for-4, hitting field goals of 23, 38, and 52 yards, followed by a 51-yard game-winner, in a 26–23 overtime win over the San Francisco 49ers, earning him AFC Special Teams Player of the Week honors. He finished the 2017 season converting 22 of 24 extra point attempts and 29 of 34 field goal attempts as the Colts finished 4–12.

==== 2018 season: Record-setting season ====
The 2018 season was one that featured several major milestones and NFL records for Vinatieri. On February 22, Vinatieri signed a one-year contract extension with the Colts through the 2018 season. In the Colts' 2018 regular season opener against the Cincinnati Bengals, Vinatieri hit a 51-yard field goal and became the oldest player to hit a field goal of 50 yards or more. In Week 2, against Washington, Vinatieri hit three extra-point attempts to score 2,501 points in his career and became only the second player in NFL history to score over 2,500 points; he also moved into fourth place all-time in extra-point attempts with 828. In Week 3, against the Philadelphia Eagles, Vinatieri connected on an extra point and 3-of-3 field goals, allowing him to tie the NFL record of 565 field goals made by Morten Andersen. In Week 4, Vinatieri hit 4-of-4 extra points and 2-of-2 field goals in a losing effort to the Houston Texans to make him the all-time leader in field goals made. He also surpassed George Blanda, moving him into fourth place all-time in career games played with 341. On October 4, 2018, Vinatieri kicked a 54-yard field goal to break his own record of the oldest player to hit a 50+ yard field goal. He also surpassed Gary Anderson, moving him into second place all-time in field goal attempts with 674. In Week 6, against the New York Jets, Vinatieri scored 10 points, hitting 2-for-2 in field goals and 4-for-4 in extra points, surpassing Anderson and moving into third place all-time in extra-point attempts. In Week 8, against the Oakland Raiders, Vinatieri scored 10 points and became the all-time NFL leader in points scored with 2,550. He earned AFC Special Teams Player of the Week for his game against the Raiders. In Week 14, in a win over the Texans, Vinatieri made 3-for-3 extra points to move into second place all-time with 860 and he also connected on a 54-yard field goal to break his own record of oldest player to connect on a 50+ yard field goal. He also became the fourth player in NFL history to play in 350 games. In a Week 17 game against the Tennessee Titans, two days after his 46th birthday, Vinatieri broke his own record with a 53-yard field goal to become the oldest player to kick a 50+ yard field goal and moved into second place for most extra point attempts with 852. He also became the fourth oldest player to play in a game. He finished the 2018 season converting 44 of 47 extra point attempts and 23 of 27 field goal attempts.

==== 2019 season ====
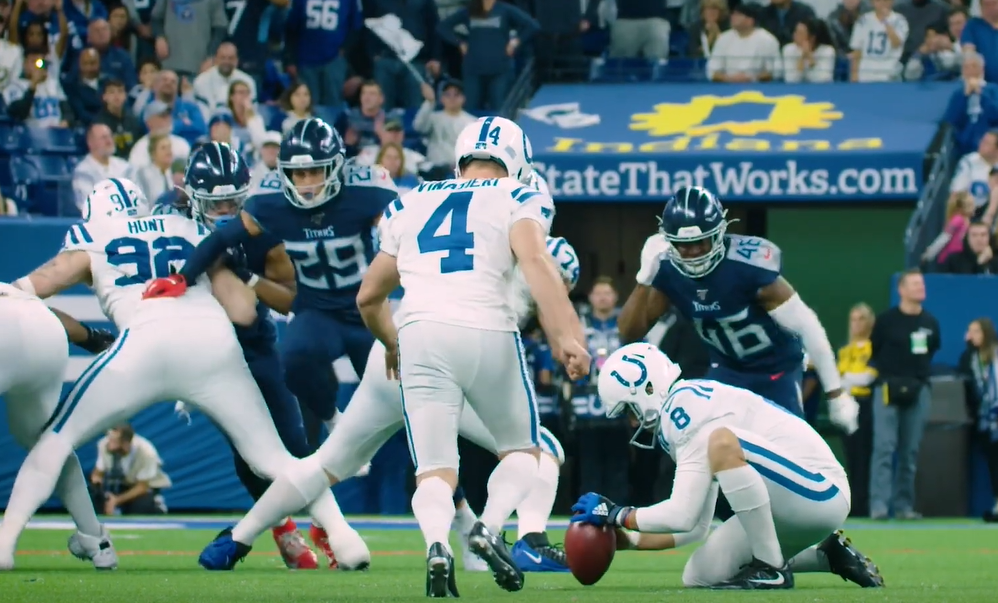
Vinatieri in a game against the Tennessee Titans

On September 8, 2019, Vinatieri started his 24th season in the NFL in a game against the Los Angeles Chargers. He had one of the worst games of his career, as he went 1–3 on field-goal attempts and 1–2 on extra points. In that game he became the third-oldest player in NFL history to play in a game and surpassed Gary Anderson for the second-most games played in NFL history. In the following game against the Tennessee Titans, he missed two more extra points. In Week 3 against the Atlanta Falcons, Vinatieri rebounded and went a perfect 3 for 3 on extra points and a perfect 2 for 2 on field goals, including a 49 yarder which hit the lower crossbar and barely went over. The 49-yarder also marked the longest field goal ever made by someone his age in an NFL game. In Week 5, Vinatieri made all four field-goal attempts and an extra point in a win over the Kansas City Chiefs. With his 701st field goal attempt, he became only the second player to attempt 700 or more field goals, joining Morten Andersen. In Week 8 against the Denver Broncos, Vinatieri made three field goals, two of which were from 50+ yards away, one of which was 55 yards, thus making him the oldest player to make two or more from that distance in a single game, as well as making him the oldest player to kick a field goal of 55 yards or more, in the 15–13 win. He was named the AFC Special Teams Player of the Week for his performance despite having missed a field goal and an extra point within the game. In the following week's game against the Pittsburgh Steelers, Vinatieri missed a potential game-winning field goal late in the fourth quarter in the 26–24 loss; this unsuccessful field goal attempt tied him with Andersen for the most field goal attempts in a career. In the next game, Vinatieri became the all-time leader in field goal attempts in a career. On December 9, 2019, the Colts placed Vinatieri on injured reserve after he underwent season-ending knee surgery. Vinatieri finished the year with career-lows in field goal and extra point completion percentage at 68% and 78.6%, respectively. He finished 17 of 25 on field goal attempts and 22 of 28 on extra point attempts.

=== Retirement ===
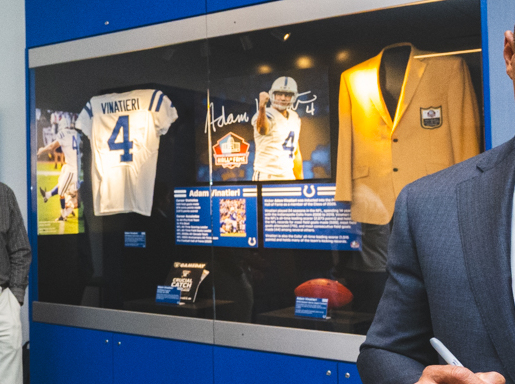
Vinatieri's Pro Football Hall of Fame case

On May 26, 2021, Vinatieri announced his retirement from the NFL after 24 seasons on the daily radio show of former Colts teammate and punter Pat McAfee. He retired as the NFL's all-time leading scorer, as well as the last active player to have played in the 1990s, and the last to play before Tom Brady. His 365 games were the second most by an NFL player all-time, behind Morten Andersen's 382.

== NFL career statistics ==
Legend
	Won the Super Bowl
	NFL record
	Led the league
**Bold**	Career high

=== Regular season ===
Year	Team	GP	Overall FGs					PATs					Kickoffs					Points
Year	Team	GP	Blk	Lng	FGA	FGM	Pct	XPA	XPM	Pct	Blk	2PT	KO	Avg	TB	Ret	Avg	Points
1996	NE	16	1	50	35	27	77.1	42	39	92.9	1	—	89	64.1	9	80	20.8	120
1997	NE	16	0	52	29	25	86.2	40	40	**100.0**	0	—	81	62.4	4	75	22.0	115
1998	NE	16	1	55	39	31	79.5	32	32	**100.0**	0	**1**	69	62.5	6	71	18.8	127
1999	NE	16	0	51	33	26	78.8	30	29	96.7	1	—	71	62.8	5	63	22.7	107
2000	NE	16	0	53	33	27	81.8	25	25	**100.0**	0	—	67	63.2	7	60	20.9	106
2001	NE	16	0	54	30	24	80.0	42	41	97.6	1	—	82	60.9	6	75	22.1	113
2002	NE	16	0	**57**	30	27	90.0	36	36	**100.0**	0	—	83	60.4	6	73	20.5	117
2003	NE	16	1	48	34	25	73.5	38	37	97.4	1	—	79	62.9	2	76	21.4	112
2004	NE	16	0	48	33	31	93.9	48	48	**100.0**	0	—	**94**	63.0	6	**86**	23.3	**141**
2005	NE	16	0	49	25	20	80.0	41	40	97.6	1	—	80	61.7	**10**	67	21.9	100
2006	IND	13	0	48	28	25	89.3	38	38	**100.0**	0	—	73	**65.8**	**10**	63	**25.3**	113
2007	IND	16	1	39	29	23	79.3	**51**	49	96.1	**2**	—	91	65.0	9	81	25.0	118
2008	IND	16	1	52	25	20	80.0	43	43	**100.0**	0	—	80	65.1	8	69	24.4	103
2009	IND	6	0	48	9	7	77.8	18	17	94.4	1	—	—	—	—	—	—	38
2010	IND	16	1	48	28	26	92.9	**51**	**51**	**100.0**	0	—	—	—	—	—	—	129
2011	IND	16	1	53	27	23	85.2	24	24	**100.0**	0	—	—	—	—	—	—	93
2012	IND	16	**2**	53	33	26	78.8	37	37	**100.0**	0	—	—	—	—	—	—	115
2013	IND	15	1	52	**40**	**35**	87.5	34	34	**100.0**	0	—	—	—	—	—	—	139
2014	IND	16	0	53	31	30	**96.8**	50	50	**100.0**	0	—	—	—	—	—	—	140
2015	IND	16	0	55	27	25	92.6	35	32	91.4	1	—	—	—	—	—	—	107
2016	IND	16	0	54	31	27	87.1	44	44	**100.0**	0	—	—	—	—	—	—	125
2017	IND	15	1	54	34	29	85.3	24	22	91.6	0	—	—	—	—	—	—	109
2018	IND	16	0	54	27	23	85.2	47	44	93.6	0	—	—	—	—	—	—	113
2019	IND	12	**2**	55	25	17	68.0	28	22	78.6	1	—	—	—	—	—	—	73
Career		365	13	57	715	599	83.8	898	874	97.3	10	1	1,049	63.0	88	939	22.2	2,673

=== Postseason ===
Year	Team	GP	Overall FGs					PATs				Kickoffs					Points
Year	Team	GP	Blk	Lng	FGA	FGM	Pct	XPA	XPM	Pct	Blk	KO	Avg	TB	Ret	Avg	Points
1996	NE	3	0	29	3	2	66.7	9	9	**100.0**	0	13	63.7	0	13	24.8	15
1997	NE	2	0	46	5	3	60.0	2	2	**100.0**	0	7	61.4	1	6	20.2	11
1998	NE	1	0	27	1	1	**100.0**	1	1	**100.0**	0	3	64.0	0	3	22.0	4
2001	NE	3	0	48	7	6	85.7	6	6	**100.0**	0	13	62.2	0	13	19.9	24
2003	NE	3	**1**	46	10	7	70.0	6	6	**100.0**	0	17	59.6	0	17	20.8	27
2004	NE	3	0	48	5	5	**100.0**	**10**	**10**	**100.0**	0	18	58.1	1	17	16.9	25
2005	NE	2	0	40	3	2	66.7	5	5	**100.0**	0	9	62.8	0	9	20.1	11
2006	IND	4	0	51	**15**	**14**	93.3	7	7	**100.0**	0	**26**	61.0	**2**	**23**	24.0	**49**
2007	IND	1	0	46	1	1	**100.0**	3	3	**100.0**	0	5	**73.2**	1	4	25.8	6
2008	IND	1	0	43	1	1	**100.0**	2	2	**100.0**	0	5	71.8	1	4	**26.5**	5
2009	IND	0	Did not play due to injury														
2010	IND	1	0	50	3	3	**100.0**	1	1	**100.0**	0	—	—	—	—	—	10
2012	IND	1	0	52	4	3	75.0	0	0	—	—	—	—	—	—	—	9
2013	IND	2	0	37	3	3	**100.0**	8	8	**100.0**	0	—	—	—	—	—	17
2014	IND	3	0	**53**	7	5	71.4	6	6	**100.0**	0	—	—	—	—	—	21
2018	IND	2	0	—	1	0	0.0	5	4	80.0	0	—	—	—	—	—	4
Total		32	1	53	69	56	81.2	71	70	98.6	0	116	62.3	6	109	21.6	238

== Career highlights ==
=== Awards and honors ===
NFL

- 4× Super Bowl champion (XXXVI, XXXVIII, XXXIX, XLI)
- 6× AFC Champion (1996, 2001, 2003, 2004, 2006, 2009)
- 3× First-team All-Pro (2002, 2004, 2014)
- 3× Pro Bowl (2002, 2004, 2014)
- NFL scoring leader (2004)
- NFL 2000s All-Decade Team
- NFL 100th Anniversary All-Time Team
- PFWA All-Rookie Team (1996)
- New England Patriots All-1990s Team
- New England Patriots All-2000s Team
- Indianapolis Colts All-2010s Team
- New England Patriots 50th Anniversary Team
- New England Patriots All-Dynasty Team
- Ranked No. 98 in the Top 100 Players of 2015
- First kicker on NFL Top 100 list
- 5× AFC Special Teams Player of the Month (October 1998, September 1999, November 2004, November 2015, October 2016)
- 19× AFC Special Teams Player of the Week (Week 4, 1996; Week 7, 1997; Week 5, 1998; Week 12, 1998; Week 14, 2001; Week 17, 2002; Week 9, 2004; Week 3, 2005; Week 1, 2006; Week 8, 2006; Week 9, 2008; Week 10, 2010; Week 17, 2010; Week 11, 2013, Week 17, 2013; Week 5, 2016; Week 5, 2017; Week 8, 2018; Week 8, 2019)
- 8× Pro Football Weekly NFL Special Teams Player of the Week (Week 5, 1998; Week 3, 2001; Week 14, 2001; Week 17, 2002; Week 9, 2004; Week 3, 2005; Week 8, 2006; Week 2, 2012)
- Pro Football Hall of Fame (2026)

College

- 4× First-team All-Conference (1991–1994)

High school

- First-team All-State (1990)

=== NFL records ===
- Most points scored: 2,673
- Most field goals made: 599
- Most field goals attempts: 715
- Most consecutive seasons scoring: 24 (1996–2019)
- Most regular-season wins by a kicker: 226
- Second most regular-season wins by a single player in any position: 226 (behind Tom Brady)
- Most seasons with 100+ points: 21 (1996–2008, 2010, 2012–2018)
- Most postseason field goals in a career: 56
- Most consecutive games in a single postseason with 3+ field goals: 4
- Most points in postseason, career: 238
- Oldest player to make a 50+ yard field goal: (55 yards) – 46 Years, 303 days.
- Oldest player to make 2 or more 50+ yard field goals in a single game: (2) – 46 Years, 303 days.
- Oldest player to make a 55+ yard field goal: (55 yards) – 46 Years, 303 days.
- Most points in a single postseason: 49
- Most field goals in a single postseason: 14 (shared with Evan McPherson)
- Most extra points in Super Bowls: 13
- Most field goals in overtime: 12
- Most consecutive field goals in NFL history: 44
- Most Super Bowl wins by a kicker: 4
- Only player to score 1,000+ points for two teams.
- Most playoff games by a kicker: 32
- Most Player of the Week Awards by a kicker: 18

== Personal life ==
Vinatieri grew up in the Black Hills of western South Dakota. His great-great-grandfather was Felix Vinatieri, an Italian immigrant who served as Lieutenant Colonel George Armstrong Custer's bandmaster. Vinatieri stated that Custer told Felix Vinatieri to head back to camp instead of going ahead with the regiment to the Battle of the Little Bighorn, a direction that saved his life. Vinatieri is also a third cousin to daredevil Evel Knievel and second cousin to scientist and author Tim Foecke (their mothers are first cousins).

Vinatieri's sister is Christine Erickson, who is currently serving as mayor of Sioux Falls, the largest city in South Dakota. Vinatieri's nephew, Chase, followed in his footsteps as a kicker at South Dakota State.

Vinatieri has an interest in motor racing and co-owns Miller Vinatieri Motorsports with former racing driver Jack Miller, which competes in multiple series in the Road to Indy.

Vinatieri has three kids with his wife, Valarie. One of his sons, A. J., was a kicker and punter at University of Louisville before entering the transfer portal. He played for Lindenwood University during the 2025–26 season.

Vinatieri once starred in a television commercial for the Snickers candy bar with the tagline, "Split the Uprights with Adam Nougatieri."

Vinatieri starred in a FanDuel commercial alongside tight end Rob Gronkowski, in which he coached Gronkowski on how to effectively kick a field goal.

He holds the Guinness World record for highest field goal kicked, at over 11,000 feet.

== See also ==
- List of National Football League annual scoring leaders
- List of NFL players by games played
