= Floy Schoenfelder =

American disability rights advocate

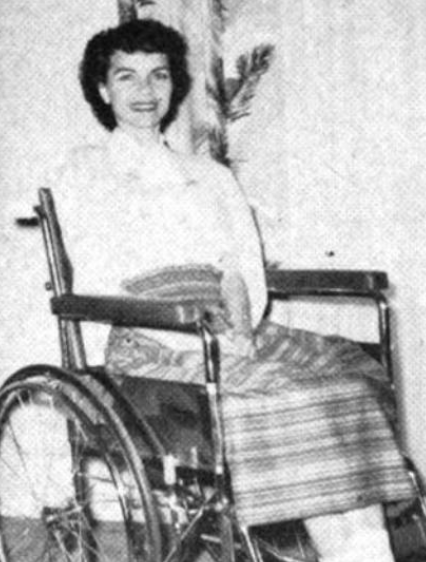
- Floy Schoenfelder, from a 1960 publication of the President's Committee on Empowerment of the Physically Handicapped
- Born: Floy LaVonne Currey; July 28, 1919; Ida Grove, Iowa
- Died: December 6, 2000 (aged 81); Santa Barbara, California
- Occupations: Writer, disability rights advocate
- Notable work: It's Morning Again (autobiography)

Floy LaVonne Currey Schoenfelder (July 28, 1919 – December 6, 2000) was an American disability rights advocate. She co-founded and directed the Polio Survivors Foundation, based in Reseda, California.

== Early life and education ==
Floy L. Currey was born in Ida Grove, Iowa, the daughter of Charles P. Currey and Mary Louisa "Lula" McLeod Currey (later Finch). Her parents were both teachers. She was a dancer and singer in her youth, and graduated from Rapid City High School in South Dakota.

== Polio and post-polio career ==
Schoenfelder was a young wife and mother working as a beautician in Rapid City, South Dakota, when she contracted polio in 1946. She required an iron lung for respiratory support in her first months of the illness, and her family moved to Los Angeles in 1947 so she could be treated at Rancho Los Amigos National Rehabilitation Center. "It was quite a thrill to go screaming through the streets of Los Angeles in an ambulance, but I hope I never have to do it again!" she recalled in 1952. She was discharged after learning to use a wheelchair and a nighttime chest respirator. She stayed active in the Rancho Los Amigos community of former patients afterwards.

In 1978, Schoenfelder was a co-founder and director of the Polio Survivors Foundation, with four other women she knew as fellow patients at Rancho Los Amigos. She was also secretary of the Totally Disabled Helpers Association, a fundraising and mutual assistance group of polio survivors based in Northridge, California.

In her later years Schoenfelder was an office manager and an accountant, with the help of technology. "I use a Portable Volume Ventilator," she explained in a 1989 essay." My wheelchair, power bed, electric typewriter, computer, lifter, a sling for the shower, and five well-placed telephones around my home and office are all just tools that help me do what I do.'" She was involved with Post-Polio Health International (PHI) and the International Ventilator Users Network (IVUN).

== Publications ==
- "How to Overcome Self-Consciousness of Your Handicap" (1958, 1960, essay)
- "My Personal Angels" (1959, short essay)
- 'What You Need to Know Before Hiring a PCA" (1998, with Jenifer Shafer)
- It's Morning Again (2001, autobiography, published posthumously)

== Personal life ==
Floy Currey married Willard Charles "Bud" Schoenfelder in 1941. They had a son, Dennis. Her husband died in 1992, and she died in 2000, in Santa Barbara, California, at the age of 81.
