= Jerry J. Shoener =

American politician (born 1927)

Jerry Shoener

Member of the South Dakota Senate from the 34th district
- In office 1997–2004

Personal details
- Born: December 19, 1927 (age 98) Eagle Butte, Ziebach County, South Dakota
- Party: Republican
- Spouse: Therese "Terry" Marion
- Children: six
- Profession: publisher

Jerry James Shoener (born December 19, 1927) is an American retired politician in the state of South Dakota. He was a member of the South Dakota State Senate. Shoener served in the United States Navy in World War II and later worked for the Rapid City Journal, eventually rising to the position as vice president and circulation director of the newspaper. He was also a member of the South Dakota Transportation Commission and Rapid City Civic Center Board.

In 2013, he was inducted into the South Dakota Hall of Fame.
