= Ed Glassgow =

American politician (1934–2022)

Member of the South Dakota Senate
- In office 1985–1988

Member of the South Dakota House of Representatives
- In office 1983–1984

Personal details
- Born: April 30, 1934 Lead, South Dakota, U.S.
- Died: March 31, 2022 (aged 87) Loveland, Colorado, U.S.
- Party: Republican
- Children: Six
- Occupation: Organization manager

Marion Edward Glassgow (April 30, 1934 – March 31, 2022) was an American politician. He served in the South Dakota House of Representatives in 1983 to 1984 and in the Senate from 1985 to 1988. Glassgow died in Loveland, Colorado on March 31, 2022, at the age of 87.
