= Rapid City Area Schools =

School district in South Dakota, United States

Address
- 625 9th Street Rapid City, South Dakota, 57701; United States

District information
- Superintendent: Nicole Swigart (Interim)

Students and staff
- Enrollment: 13,620 (as of 2019-20)
- Staff: 839.49 (FTE) (as of 2019-20)
- Student–teacher ratio: 16.22 (as of 2019-20)

Other information
- Website: Rapid City Area Schools

Rapid City Area Schools, formally Rapid City Area School District 51-4, is a public school district serving Rapid City, South Dakota with 31 schools.

== Boundary ==
The majority of the land is in Pennington County. The district covers all of Rapid City except with the land with Rapid City Airport, as well as a part of Box Elder. The district also covers all or parts of these census-designated places: All of Colonial Pine Hills and Johnson Siding, and parts of Ashland Heights, Green Valley and Rapid Valley.

A portion of the district is in Meade County. There, it includes Blackhawk CDP and a portion of Summerset.

== Schools ==
=== Elementary schools ===
- Black Hawk Elementary School
- Corral Drive Elementary School
- General Beadle Elementary School
- Grandview Elementary School
- Horace Mann Elementary School
- Knollwood Elementary School
- Meadowbrook Elementary School
- Pinedale Elementary School
- Rapid City Online Elementary
- Rapid Valley Elementary School
- Robbinsdale Elementary School
- South Canyon Elementary School
- South Park Elementary School
- Valley View Elementary School
- Wilson Elementary School

=== Middle schools ===
- East Middle School
- North Middle School
- Rapid City Online Middle School
- South Middle School
- Southwest Middle School
- West Middle School

=== High schools ===
- Central High School
- Stevens High School
- Rapid City High School
- Rapid City Online High School

=== Other schools ===
- Alternative Education Center
- Jefferson Academy
- Virtual High School
- Lincoln 9th grade
