= Central High School (Rapid City, South Dakota) =

Coordinates: 44°05′17″N 103°13′48″W

- Central High School (Rapid City, South Dakota)
- 433 Mt Rushmore Road North; Rapid City, South Dakota 57701; United States

Information
- Type: Public
- School district: Rapid City Area Schools
- Principal: Terry Lundeen
- Head of school: Lori J Simon, Superintendent
- Staff: 119.30 (FTE)
- Grades: 9–12
- Student to teacher ratio: 16.93
- Colors: Red, white
- Athletics: Basketball, tennis, football, golf, soccer, softball, track, volleyball, wrestling, cross country
- Mascot: Karl Cobbler
- School Song: Huckleberry Hound, Let's Go, Rapid City
- Website: https://central.rcas.org/

Central High School is a high school in Rapid City, South Dakota. The principal is Terry Lundeen. The high school mascot is Karl Cobbler. The nickname was changed from "Tigers" to "Cobblers" to honor the South Dakota Hall of Fame Coach, Euclid N. "Euc" Cobb.

Central teams compete in the AA class, with teams from Spearfish, Sturgis, Rapid City Stevens, and Sioux Falls schools. Central High School moved from its original location south of downtown, to north of downtown and just west of the Rushmore Plaza Civic Center in 1978. The original location was renovated and opened in the fall of 2013 as Rapid City High School again. United States President Calvin Coolidge made his announcement that he would not run for the presidency in 1927 from the old campus.

== Notable alumni ==
- John Dutton – NFL Pro Bowl defensive lineman
- Adam Vinatieri – four-time Super Bowl-winning and 2026 NFL Hall of Fame placekicker for the New England Patriots and Indianapolis Colts
- Emily Graslie – American science communicator and YouTube educator
- Tomi Lahren – conservative online talk show host for TheBlaze
