= Rapid Valley, South Dakota =

- CDP
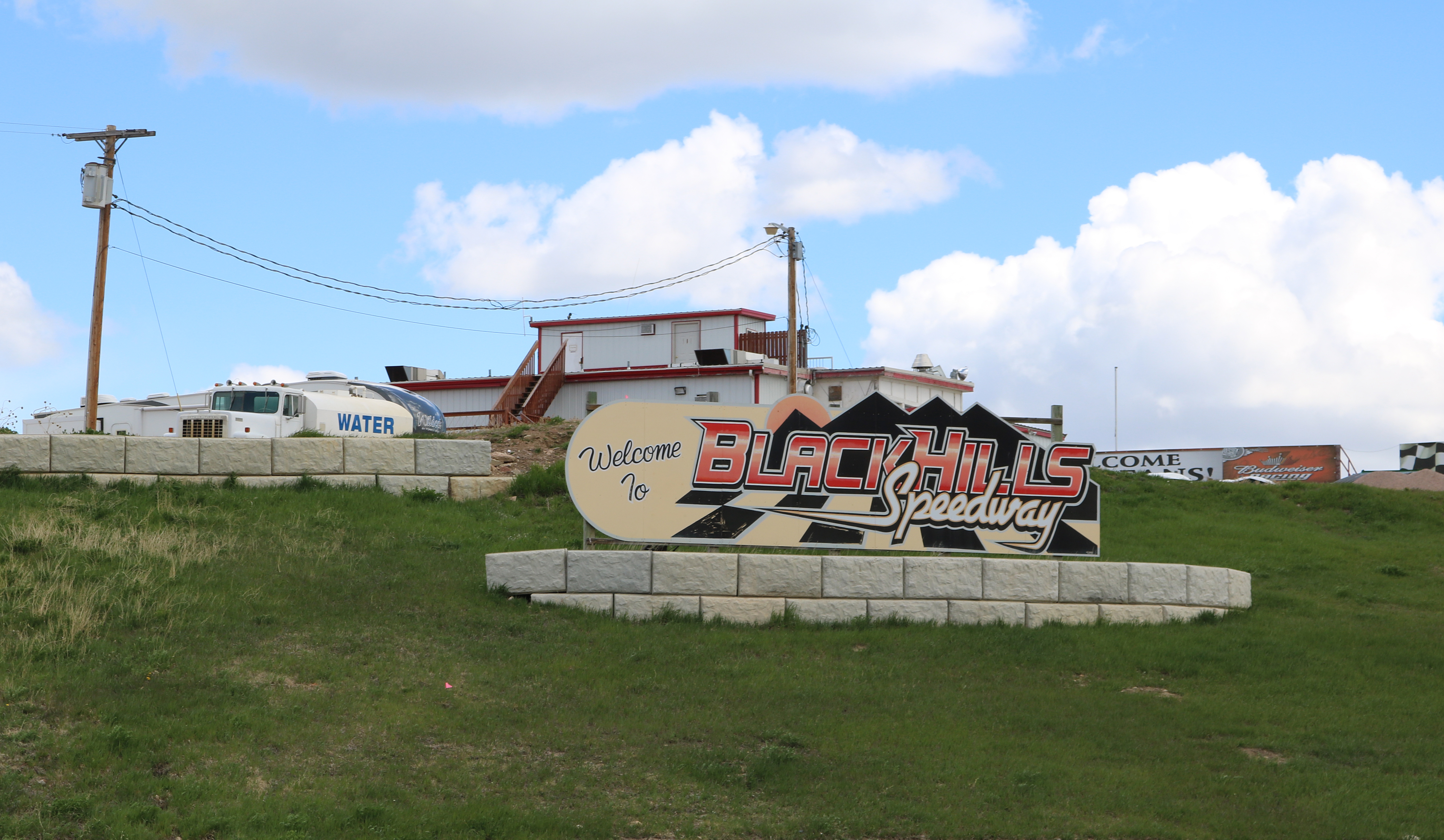
- The Black Hills Speedway, located on Jolly Lane in Rapid Valley.

- Location in Pennington County and the state of South Dakota
- Coordinates: 44°04′03″N 103°07′20″W
- Country: United States
- State: South Dakota
- County: Pennington

Area
  - Total: 6.47 sq mi (16.75 km^{2})
  - Land: 6.47 sq mi (16.75 km^{2})
  - Water: 0 sq mi (0.00 km^{2})
- Elevation: 3,245 ft (989 m)

Population (2020)
  - Total: 8,098
  - Density: 1,252.1/sq mi (483.42/km^{2})
- Time zone: UTC−7 (Mountain (MST))
  - Summer (DST): UTC−6 (MDT)
- Area code: 605
- FIPS code: 46-53007
- GNIS feature ID: 2393201

Rapid Valley is a census-designated place (CDP) and unincorporated community in Pennington County, South Dakota, United States, and a suburb of Rapid City. The population was 8,098 at the 2020 census. Rapid Valley has been a retreat for people living in Rapid City due to its low crime, cheap land, and views of the Black Hills. Rapid Valley is home to many industrial and financial businesses, and is the headquarters for many corporations specializing in transport and engineering.

== Geography ==
According to the United States Census Bureau, the CDP has a total area of 10.1 square miles (26.3 km^{2}), all land. Rapid Valley is considered an unincorporated suburb of Rapid City, and is located five minutes east of Rapid City on the prairie.

== Cityscape ==
Rapid Valley is often portrayed as the ideal example of urban sprawl. Many subdivisions are located in Rapid Valley. Rapid City has repeatedly made attempts at annexing Rapid Valley and while sections have been annexed, most attempts fail.

== Demographics ==
Historical population
Census	Pop.	Note	%±
1980	3,265		—
1990	5,968		82.8%
2000	7,043		18.0%
2010	8,260		17.3%
2020	8,098		−2.0%
U.S. Decennial Census

At the 2000 census there were 7,043 people, 2,436 households, and 1,914 families in the CDP. The population density was 694.0 inhabitants per square mile (268.0/km^{2}). There were 2,493 housing units at an average density of 245.7 per square mile (94.9/km^{2}). The racial makeup of the CDP was 90.69% White, 0.62% African American, 4.00% Native American, 0.53% Asian, 0.10% Pacific Islander, 0.40% from other races, and 3.66% from two or more races. Hispanic or Latino of any race were 2.51%.

Of the 2,436 households 47.2% had children under the age of 18 living with them, 60.7% were married couples living together, 13.3% had a female householder with no husband present, and 21.4% were non-families. 16.1% of households were one person and 3.5% were one person aged 65 or older. The average household size was 2.89 and the average family size was 3.23.

The age distribution was 33.1% under the age of 18, 8.9% from 18 to 24, 34.6% from 25 to 44, 18.1% from 45 to 64, and 5.3% 65 or older. The median age was 30 years. For every 100 females, there were 101.7 males. For every 100 females age 18 and over, there were 97.0 males.

The median household income was $39,816 and the median family income was $42,956. Males had a median income of $29,170 versus $20,792 for females. The per capita income for the CDP was $14,841. About 5.8% of families and 8.7% of the population were below the poverty line, including 11.8% of those under age 18 and 3.1% of those age 65 or over.

== Education ==
Most of the CDP is in the Rapid City School District 51-4. while portions are in the Douglas School District and the
