= Sturgis Commercial Block =

- U.S. National Register of Historic Places
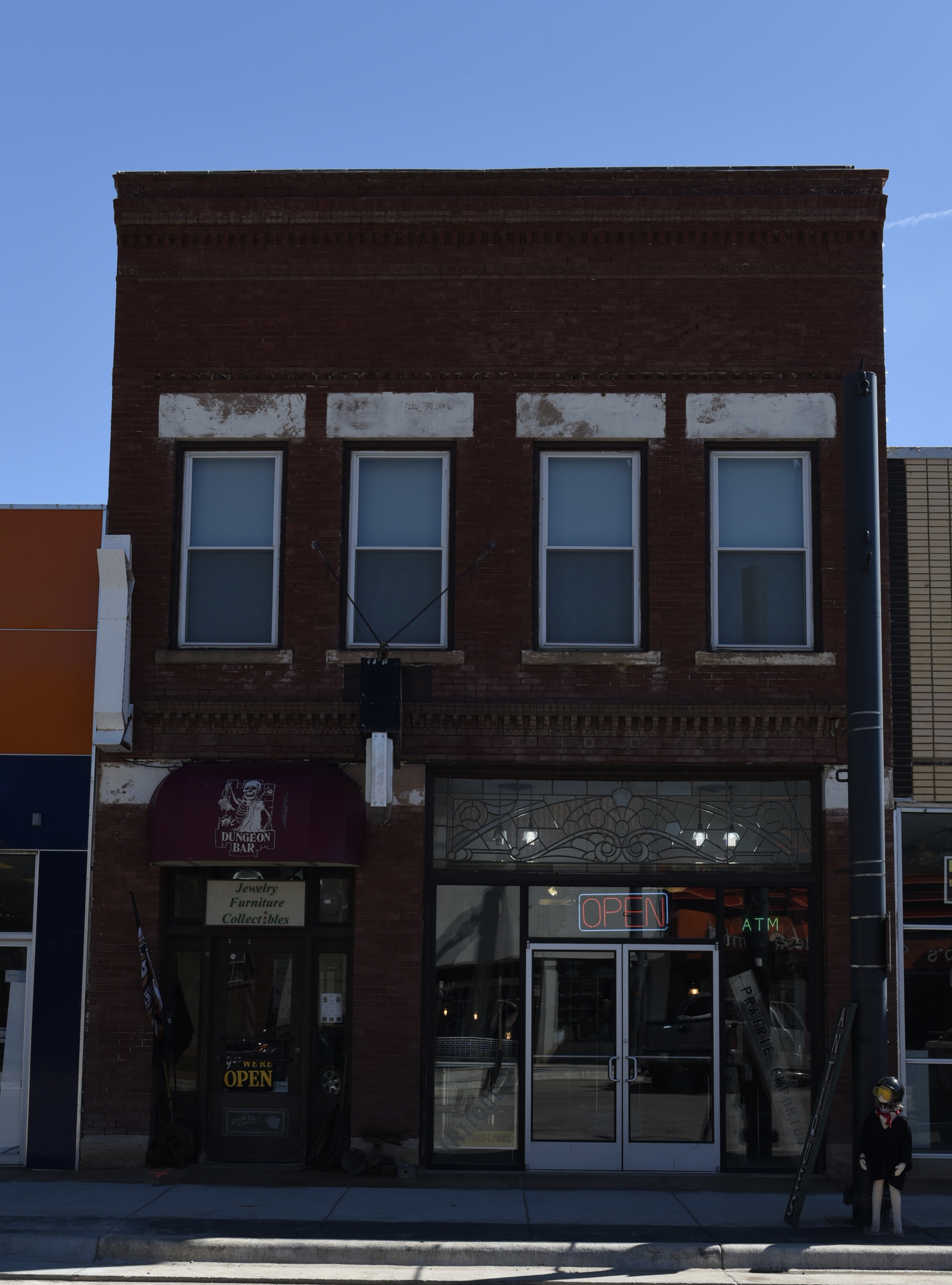

- Location within South Dakota Location within the United States
- Location: 1000-1028 Main St., Sturgis, South Dakota
- Coordinates: 44°24′50″N 103°30′33″W
- Area: 2 acres (0.81 ha)
- Built: 1888
- NRHP reference No.: 75001719
- Added to NRHP: June 20, 1975

The Sturgis Commercial Block, on the south side of Main Street in Sturgis, South Dakota, is a row of buildings running from number 1000 to number 1028 Main St. It is a historic district consisting of nine contributing buildings which was listed on the National Register of Historic Places in 1975.

Six of the buildings have front facades of cut stone; two are two-story while the rest are one-story. Buildings include:

- 1008 Main (built in 1898). This one-story cut stone building with three arched openings.
- 1012 Main (1899). One-story, cut stone, has a triangular cresting at its roof edge.
- 1016 Main (1899) and 1020 Main (1899). Two identical one-story, cut stone buildings.
- 7022 Main (1900). Two-story cut stone building which originally had a small second-story balcony.
