= Pahasapa Formation =

- Stratigraphic range: Mississippian 359.2 – 318.1 Ma
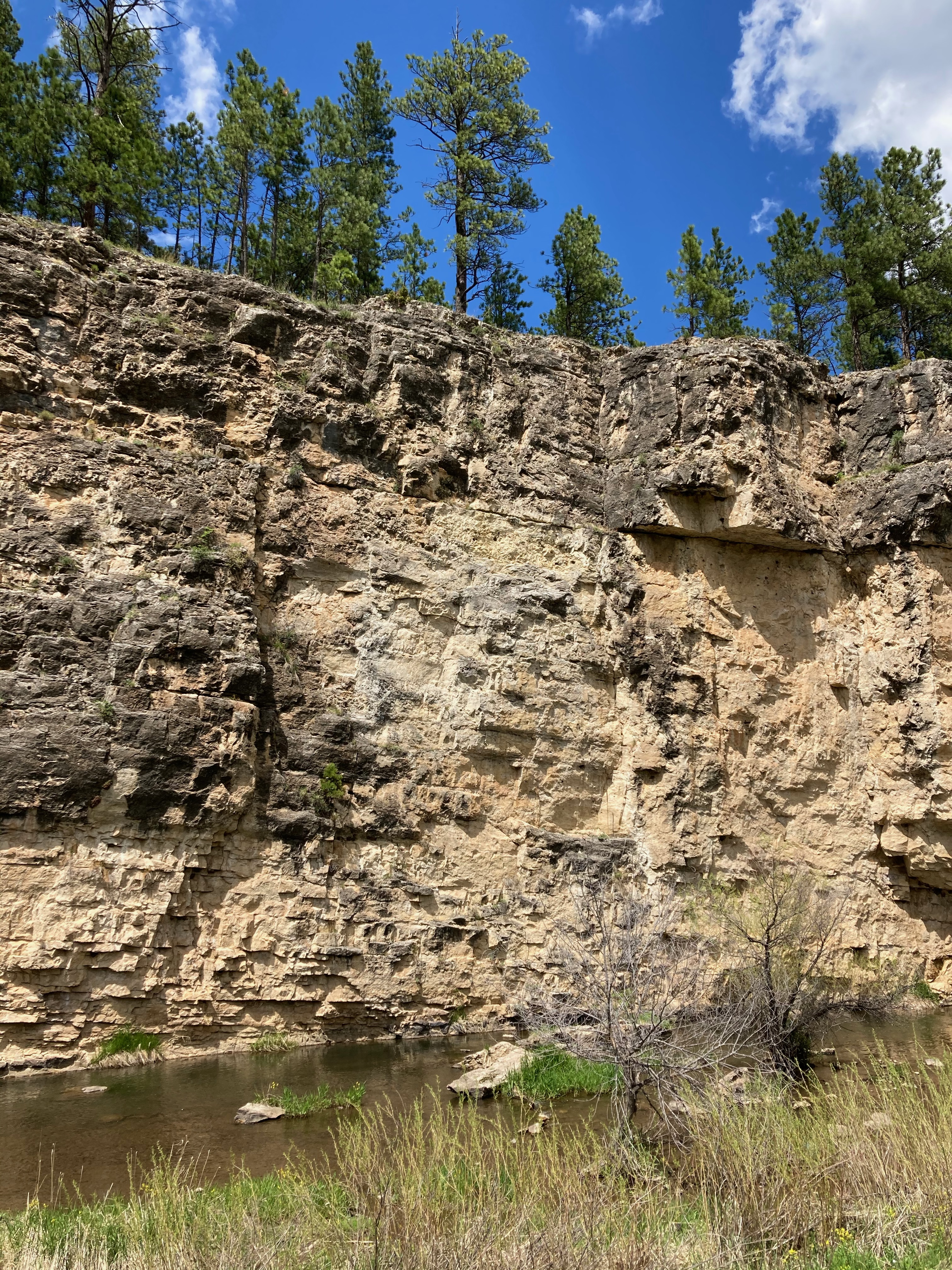
- An exposure of the cliff forming Pahasapa west of Rapid City, along Nemo Road. The karstic tendencies of the unit are clearly visible in the pitting of the face.
- Type: Formation
- Underlies: Minnelusa Formation
- Overlies: Englewood Formation
- Thickness: 225-500 ft

Lithology
- Primary: Limestone
- Other: Dolomite, dolomitic limestone

Location
- Region: South Dakota, Wyoming, Nebraska
- Country: United States

Type section
- Named for: the Lakota people's name for the Black Hills
- Named by: Darton, in 1901

The Pahasapa Formation is a geological unit of primarily limestone and dolomite that is exposed in the Black Hills of South Dakota and northeastern Wyoming, and underlies parts of Nebraska, in the United States. Also referred to as the Pahasapa Limestone (especially in older publications and outside South Dakota), this unit is analogous to the Madison Limestone, the Lodgepole Limestone, and the Burlington Limestone, other Mississippian-aged limestones and dolomites in the midwestern United States. Some recent literature has grouped stretches of the Pahasapa into the Madison Group. The formation is of local importance, as it contains the Madison aquifer and two of the ten longest caves in the world.

== Lithology ==
The Pahasapa consists mainly of grey massive limestone and dolomite. The limestone has been classified as primary dolo-sparitic, with some micrite, using the Folk classification, and as skeletal wackestone using the Dunham classification. The central Black Hills Pahasapa is more dominantly dolomite, while the outer fringes tend more strongly limestone. In the upper sections, it can consist of limestone interbedded with dolomites, or simply evaporite dolomites.

The Pahasapa has a gradational, conformable contact with the Devonian Englewood Formation beneath it, and an unconformable contact Pennsylvanian Minnelusa Formation.

== Geologic history ==
During the Mississippian, the sea gradually transgressed over the current United States Mid-west, depositing significant limestone sequences across the region. The Pahasapa is one of a suite of geologically analogous formations that cover much of the central US and were deposited by the same sea. Within this large-scale sea level rise, there were many smaller cycles of transgression and regression, which are expressed in stratigraphic facies packages within the larger framework of the formation.

The formation is marine in origin, and bedding planes, cross-stratification, and fossil assemblages indicate that it was deposited in high-energy, relatively shallow water. The formation lacks reef-building organisms, but variable dip directions in the deposits indicate it may have been deposited on a marine bank.

Due to the widespread nature of the dolomitization of the Pahasapa in the central Black Hills, but the sparse alteration outside of this area, the alteration is interpreted to have occurred early in the formation's history, before consolidation, while the newly deposited limestone was still close to sea-level. This selective alteration also supported the interpretation of a marine bank deposition, with the central Pahasapa making up the central marine bank.

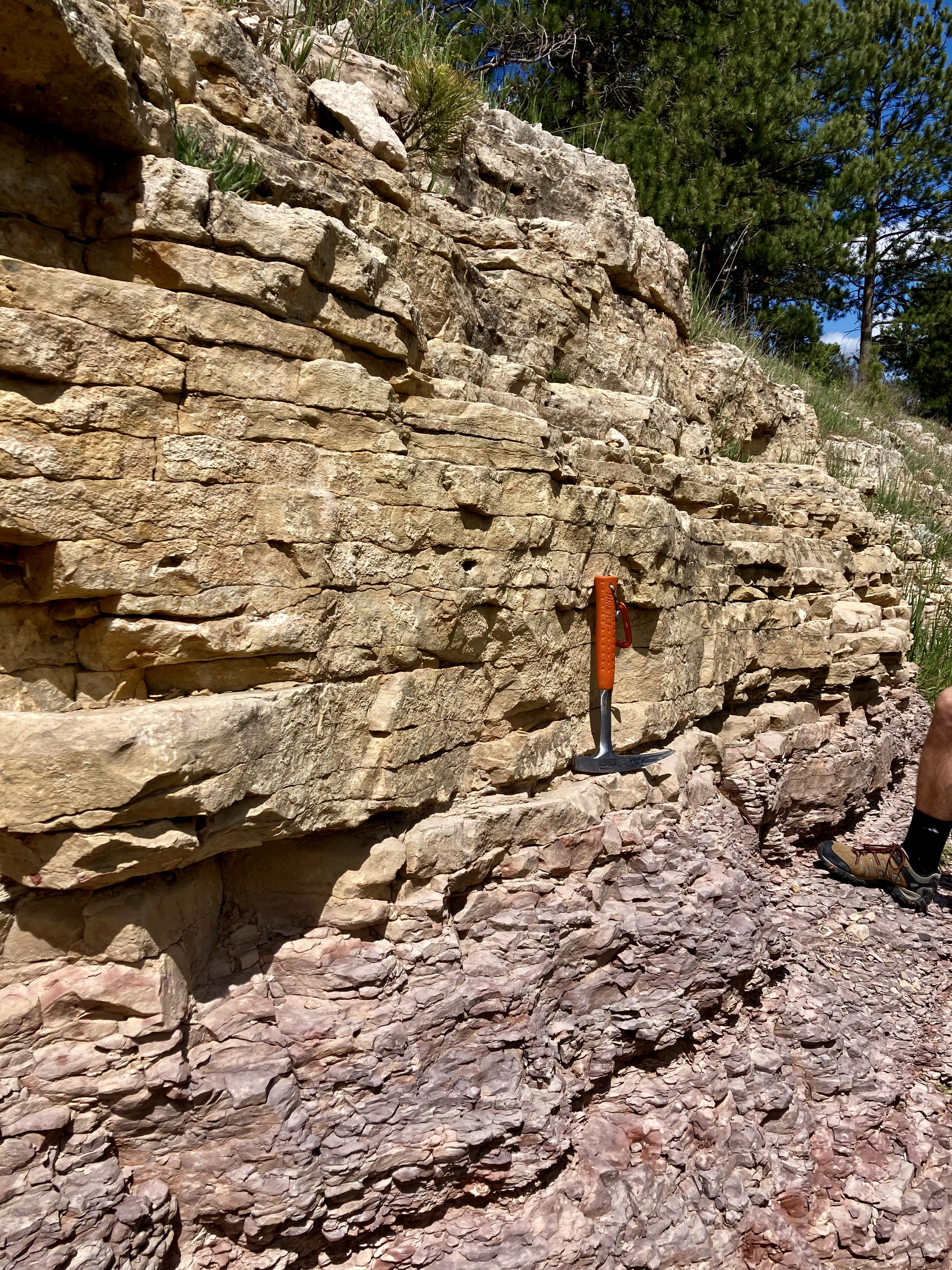
The gradational, conformable contact between the Devonian Englewood Fm and the Mississippian Pahasapa Fm, along SD 44, west of Rapid City. Standard rock hammer for scale.

== Fossil content ==
As the Pahasapa is a marine limestone, the fossils it contains are primarily brachiopods and scattered corals, along with some crinoid plates, gastropods, and bryozoans. Corals are chiefly Syringopora, and are found generally found near the gradational contact with the Englewood Formation. Also found were the molluscs Bellerophon, Euomphalus, and the marine invertebrates Pentremites. Burrows, a trace fossil left by species working the sediment before it lithified, are also common in the lower sections of the formation.

In the sections of the Pahasapa that have been dolomitized, many of the fossils have been destroyed due to recrystallization of the calcium carbonate, and those that remain have a distinctive "sugary" appearance.

== Features ==
All of the caves in the Black Hills are developed in the Pahasapa. Two of the most notable of these caves are Wind Cave, the sixth longest cave in the world, and Jewel Cave, the fifth longest cave in the world. Wind Cave is known for its calcite boxwork, a distinctive speleothem, and its passages that intersect with paleocave fill, indicating Mississippian-era caves that developed and then were flooded with sediment.

The Madison aquifer, the most important aquifer in South Dakota, is contained within the upper sections of the Pahasapa formation.

== See also ==
- List of fossiliferous stratigraphic units in South Dakota
- Paleontology in South Dakota
- List of longest caves
