= Wind Cave National Park =

National park in South Dakota, United States

- IUCN category II (national park)
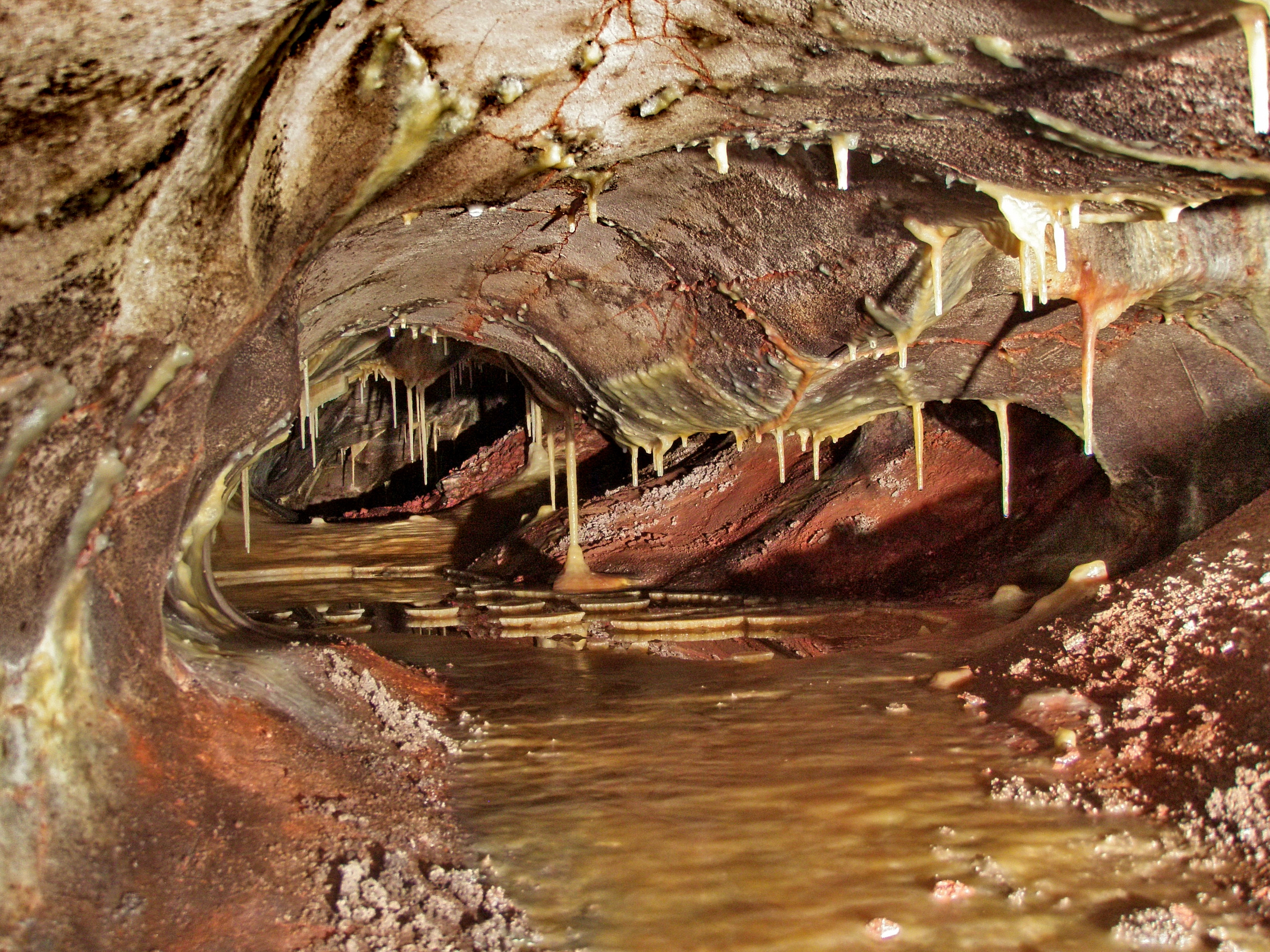
- Skyway Lake

- Location within South Dakota Location within the United States
- Interactive map of Wind Cave National Park
- Location: Custer County, South Dakota, US
- Nearest city: Hot Springs, South Dakota
- Coordinates: 43°33′23″N 103°28′43″W
- Area: 33,847 acres (136.97 km^{2})
- Established: January 9, 1903; 123 years ago
- Visitors: 489,399 (in 2024)
- Governing body: National Park Service
- Website: Wind Cave National Park

Wind Cave National Park is a national park of the United States located 10 miles (16 km) north of the town of Hot Springs in western South Dakota. Established on January 3, 1903 by President Theodore Roosevelt, it was the sixth national park in the U.S. and the first cave to be designated a national park anywhere in the world. The cave has calcite formations known as boxwork, as well as frostwork. Approximately 95 percent of the world's discovered boxwork formations are found in Wind Cave.

Wind Cave is one of the best known examples of a breathing cave. The cave is recognized as the densest cave system in the world, with the greatest passage volume per cubic mile. Wind Cave is the sixth longest cave in the world with 168.02 miles (270.40 km) of explored cave passageways (as of 2025) and the third longest cave in the United States, though it is only the second longest cave in Custer County, South Dakota behind Jewel Cave. Despite the close proximity, no connection has ever been found between Wind Cave and Jewel Cave and most geologists believe the caves are not connected. Above ground, the park includes the largest remaining natural mixed grass prairie in the United States, as well as the southern terminus of the South Dakota Centennial Trail.

== Origin of name ==
The passages of the cave are said to "breathe" as air continually moves into or out of them, equalizing the atmospheric pressure of the cave and the outside air. When the air pressure is higher outside the cave than inside it, air flows into the cave, raising the cave's pressure to match the outside pressure. When the air pressure inside the cave is higher than outside it, air flows out of the cave, lowering the air pressure within the cave. A large cave such as Wind Cave with only a few small openings will "breathe" more obviously than a small cave with many large openings.

Rapid weather changes, accompanied by rapid barometric changes, are a feature of western South Dakota weather. If a fast-moving storm was approaching on the day the Bingham brothers found the cave, the atmospheric pressure would have been dropping fast, causing the cave's higher-pressure air to rush out all available openings, creating the wind for which Wind Cave was named.

== History ==
The Lakota, Cheyenne, and other Native American tribes who traveled through and made camps around the area were aware of the cave's existence, as were early Euro-American settlers, but there has been no recorded evidence discovered that anyone actually entered it.

The Lakota (Sioux), an indigenous people who live in the Black Hills region of South Dakota, spoke of a hole that blew air, a place they consider sacred as the site where they first emerged from the underworld where they had lived before the demiurge creation of the world. Originally called Washun Niya, Wind Cave played an important role in the traditions and culture of the Lakota people. The oral history of these people tell the story of Tokahe, the first human to emerge from the cave, symbolizing an emergence from the underworld. His story and presence at Wind Cave is an important part of Lakota history, and heavily influences their origin story.

Wind Cave and other areas throughout the Black Hills were important to the native people in other ways beyond spirituality. Nicknamed, euphemistically, as a "supermarket", the areas surrounding the cave provided abundant resources for native survival. Often during the winter seasons, such areas served as ideal spots for camps; much of the game they hunted preferred the shelter provided by the cave and made these areas ideal to become Lakota settlements and hunting grounds.

The eventual dispossession of the Lakota people followed the consistent history of dispossession of indigenous peoples across the country. In 1851 a Treaty was formed at Fort Laramie, entering the tribe into a legal relationship with the U.S. government. Another Treaty of Fort Laramie in 1868 redefined and reduced the borders of Lakota land within the Black Hills. Article two within that treaty allowed for forts to be built within Lakota land and in 1874 General George A. Custer began surveying the land and mistakenly reported a significant presence of gold, despite the geologist on his team of surveyors saying there were no quantities of substance. Miners then began to invade the hills in search of gold, which was against the treaty with the Lakota people, though the government did little to punish such offenses. In 1875 the Lakota title to the land was deemed invalid due to their lack of structural development and supposed "wasting" of the land. When the Dawes Act was passed in 1877, the site was opened to settlers and effectively sealed the dispossession of the Lakota from their ancestral lands.

The first documented discovery of the cave by white Americans was in 1881, when the brothers Tom and Jesse Bingham heard wind rushing out from a 10-inch (25 cm) by 14-inch (36 cm) hole in the ground. According to the story, when Tom looked into the hole, the wind exiting the cave blew his hat off of his head.

From 1881 to 1889, few people ventured far into Wind Cave. Then in 1889 the South Dakota Mining Company hired Jesse D. McDonald to oversee their mining claim on the cave site. The South Dakota Mining Company may have hoped to find valuable minerals, or it may have had commercial development of the cave in mind from the start.

No valuable mineral deposits were found, and the McDonald family began developing the cave for tourism. Jesse initially hired his son Alvin (age 16 in 1890) and, beginning in 1891, Alvin's brother Elmer, to explore and help develop the cave. Alvin fell in love with the cave and kept a cave diary. Others who worked at Wind Cave and helped explore it between 1890 and 1903 include Katie Stabler, Emma McDonald (Elmer's wife), Inez McDonald (Emma and Elmer's daughter), and Tommy McDonald (brother of Elmer and Alvin).

By February 1892 the cave was open for visitors; the standard tour fee was apparently $1.00 (equivalent to roughly $30 in 2021). Tourists explored the cave by candlelight on guided tours. These early tours were physically demanding and sometimes involved crawling through narrow passages.

Jan and Herb Conn played an important role in Wind Cave's exploration during the 1960s, as they did with the nearby Jewel Cave National Monument, currently the fifth longest cave in the world.

== Location ==
The park is in an unincorporated area of Custer County. The closest municipality is Hot Springs, in Fall River County.

== Flora and fauna ==
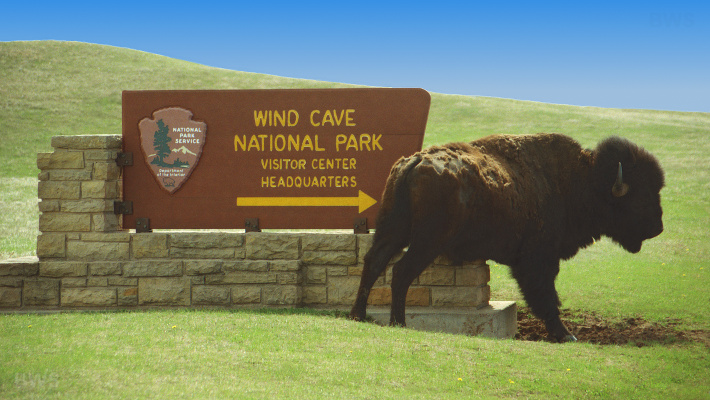
A bison scratches against the stone base of a park sign.

Wind Cave National Park protects a diverse ecosystem with eastern and western plant and animal species. Wildlife that inhabits this park include raccoons, elk, bison, coyotes, skunks, badgers, ermines, black-footed ferrets, cougars, bobcats, red foxes, minks, whooping crane, pronghorn and prairie dogs. The Wind Cave bison herd is one of only four free-roaming and genetically pure herds on public lands in North America. The other three herds are the Yellowstone Park bison herd, the Henry Mountains bison herd in Utah, and on Elk Island in Alberta, Canada. The Wind Cave bison herd is currently brucellosis-free.

=== Endangered species ===
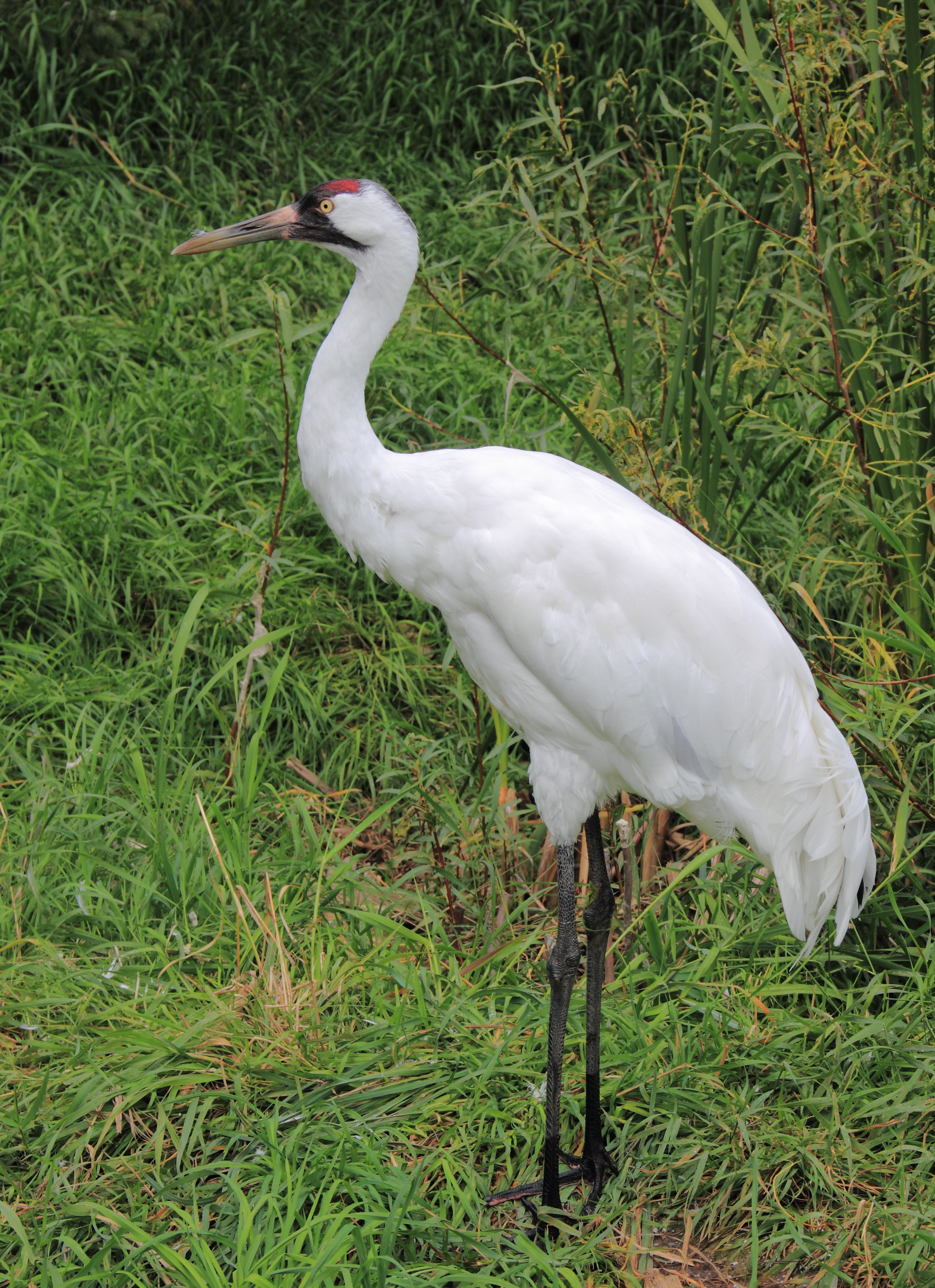
Whooping Crane

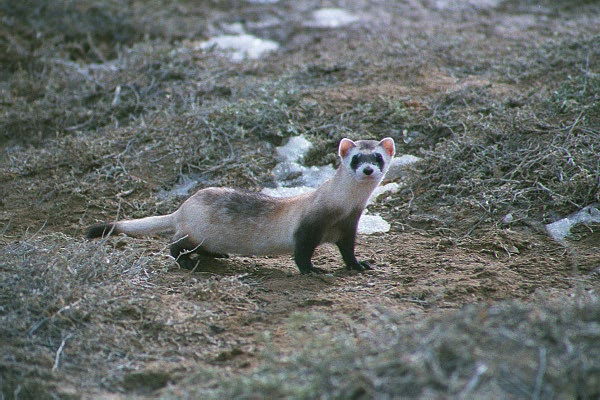
Black-footed ferret

The black-footed ferret and whooping crane are on the endangered species list. The whooping crane population in Wind Cave National Park is considered a non-self-sustaining wild population.

== Climate ==
Climate data for Wind Cave, South Dakota (1991–2020 normals, extremes 1990–present)
Month	Jan	Feb	Mar	Apr	May	Jun	Jul	Aug	Sep	Oct	Nov	Dec	Year
Record high °F (°C)	69 (21)	69 (21)	77 (25)	89 (32)	92 (33)	102 (39)	105 (41)	101 (38)	103 (39)	89 (32)	76 (24)	66 (19)	105 (41)
Mean maximum °F (°C)	57.5 (14.2)	57.7 (14.3)	69.3 (20.7)	77.3 (25.2)	84.6 (29.2)	91.8 (33.2)	96.0 (35.6)	94.7 (34.8)	91.3 (32.9)	79.7 (26.5)	67.2 (19.6)	56.9 (13.8)	97.7 (36.5)
Mean daily maximum °F (°C)	39.7 (4.3)	40.7 (4.8)	50.0 (10.0)	57.7 (14.3)	66.4 (19.1)	77.4 (25.2)	84.7 (29.3)	83.6 (28.7)	76.2 (24.6)	61.4 (16.3)	48.4 (9.1)	39.4 (4.1)	60.5 (15.8)
Daily mean °F (°C)	27.2 (−2.7)	28.1 (−2.2)	36.8 (2.7)	44.3 (6.8)	53.7 (12.1)	63.8 (17.7)	70.7 (21.5)	69.2 (20.7)	61.2 (16.2)	47.7 (8.7)	35.9 (2.2)	27.4 (−2.6)	47.2 (8.4)
Mean daily minimum °F (°C)	14.8 (−9.6)	15.5 (−9.2)	23.7 (−4.6)	30.9 (−0.6)	40.9 (4.9)	50.1 (10.1)	56.6 (13.7)	54.9 (12.7)	46.2 (7.9)	34.0 (1.1)	23.4 (−4.8)	15.4 (−9.2)	33.9 (1.1)
Mean minimum °F (°C)	−9.6 (−23.1)	−8.3 (−22.4)	1.2 (−17.1)	14.6 (−9.7)	26.0 (−3.3)	37.6 (3.1)	45.8 (7.7)	42.8 (6.0)	31.5 (−0.3)	15.1 (−9.4)	1.5 (−16.9)	−7.2 (−21.8)	−18.2 (−27.9)
Record low °F (°C)	−30 (−34)	−32 (−36)	−20 (−29)	1 (−17)	15 (−9)	30 (−1)	38 (3)	31 (−1)	23 (−5)	−2 (−19)	−15 (−26)	−27 (−33)	−32 (−36)
Average precipitation inches (mm)	0.45 (11)	0.70 (18)	1.07 (27)	2.32 (59)	3.74 (95)	3.29 (84)	3.01 (76)	2.30 (58)	1.53 (39)	1.55 (39)	0.71 (18)	0.53 (13)	21.20 (538)
Average snowfall inches (cm)	6.3 (16)	7.1 (18)	9.6 (24)	7.8 (20)	0.9 (2.3)	0.0 (0.0)	0.0 (0.0)	0.0 (0.0)	0.2 (0.51)	2.1 (5.3)	4.4 (11)	7.5 (19)	45.9 (117)
Average precipitation days (≥ 0.01 in)	4.5	5.8	6.0	9.4	11.2	11.4	9.7	8.5	6.3	7.0	4.1	3.8	87.7
Average snowy days (≥ 0.1 in)	3.9	4.9	3.5	2.8	0.5	0.0	0.0	0.0	0.1	1.1	2.7	3.6	23.1
Source: NOAA

Throughout the years, the great plains have seen a considerable rise in temperature. Being that Wind Cave is located in the great plains, these temperature rises have already started to affect the park and the area around it. The average temperature rise across the plains has been two degrees Fahrenheit, with some areas seeing increases as high as five degrees Fahrenheit. This trend is projected to cause drought like conditions in the area.

== Infrastructure ==
Several roads run through the park and there are 30 miles (48 km) of hiking trails on the surface. The park had an estimated 656,397 visitors in 2018. More than 109,000 people toured the cave itself in 2015, the most since 1968 before cave tours were limited to 40 people each.

The Wind Cave visitor center features three exhibit rooms about the geology of the caves and early cave history, the park's wildlife and natural history, and the work of the Civilian Conservation Corps in the park.

Elk Mountain Campground, located in a ponderosa pine forest, is about 1.25 miles (2.0 km) from the visitor center. The campground has 75 sites for tents and recreational vehicles and is open year-round with campfire programs offered in the summer and limited services available in the winter.

== Geology ==
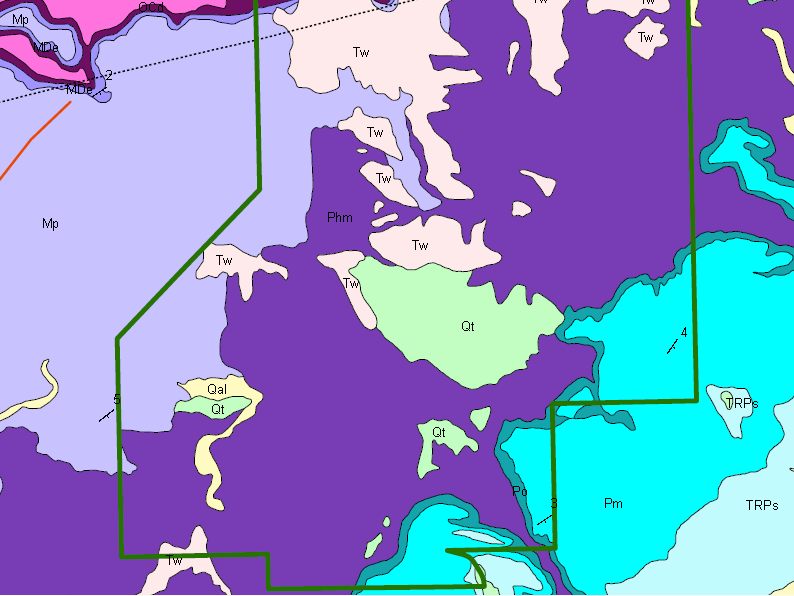
A geological map of the park: NPS Wind Cave National Park Geologic Map, where Mp is the Mississippian Pahasapa (Madison) Limestone, Phm is the Pennsylvanian Minnelusa Formation, Po is the Permian Opeche Shale, Pm is the Minnekahta Limestone, TRPs is the Triassic Spearfish Formation, Tw is the Tertiary White River Group, while Qal and Qt are Quaternary alluvial deposits

The three levels making up the Wind Cave system are located in the upper 76 m of the Mississippian Pahasapa Limestone. Deposited in an inland sea, chert, gypsum, and anhydrite lenses within the limestone are evidence of high periods of evaporation. When sea levels dropped at the end of the Mississippian, dissolution of the limestone formed a Kaskaskia paleokarst terrain, complete with solution fissures, sinkholes, and caves. Thus, an unconformity exists between this limestone and the overlying Pennsylvanian Minnelusa Formation. These red sands and clays filled in cavities. Those cavities not filled in were coated in dogtooth spar.

Subsequent deposition of the Permian Opeche Shale, Permian Minnekahta Limestone, Triassic Spearfish Formation, and Tertiary White River Group followed. Paleocene and Eocene erosion removed these overlying sediments, in the area of the caves, down to the Minnelusa. Geologic uplift started during the Laramide Orogeny, which lowered the water table, draining the cave system and enlarging it. Today the water level is 150 m below the surface, which amounts to a drop of 0.4 m every 1000 years.

Boxwork was first noted in Wind Cave. These calcite fins were once cracks filling gypsum and anhydrite. Calcite-gypsum pseudomorphs are common. The released sulfuric acid weakened the bedrock, allowing it to weather faster than the calcite. The resultant intersecting fins form open chambers and protrude from the surrounding bedrock by amounts ranging from 0.6 to 1.2 m. Lower levels of the cave have boxworks mixed with frostwork and cave popcorn. Helictite bushes were also first discovered in Wind Cave. Moonmilk is found on many surfaces, while calcite rafts are found in the lower levels of the cave system.

== In popular culture ==
During the 2020 Democratic Party presidential primary debate on December 19, 2019, candidate Senator Amy Klobuchar referenced the Wind Cave as part of an attack on fellow candidate Mayor Pete Buttigieg, who had hosted a campaign fundraiser in a purported wine cave. Klobuchar remarked, "I came here to make a case for progress, and I have never even been to a wine cave. I’ve been to the Wind Cave in South Dakota, which I suggest you go to." South Dakota public figures, including the state's Representative Dusty Johnson, used it to promote tourism to Wind Cave National Park.

The cave is featured in Dan Jorgensen's novel And the Wind Whispered.

== Gallery ==
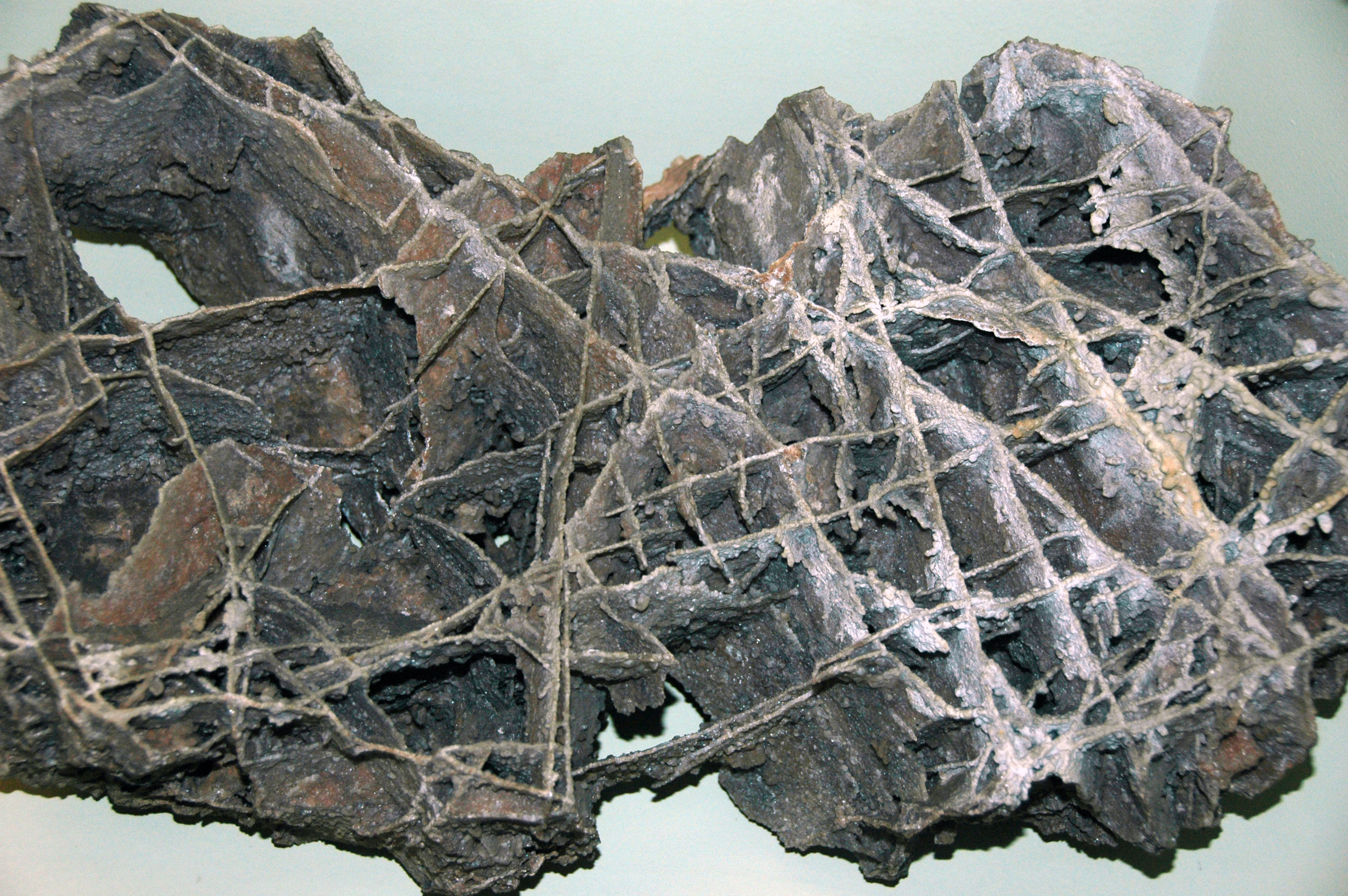
Calcite boxwork removed from the cave; Field Museum of Natural History, Chicago

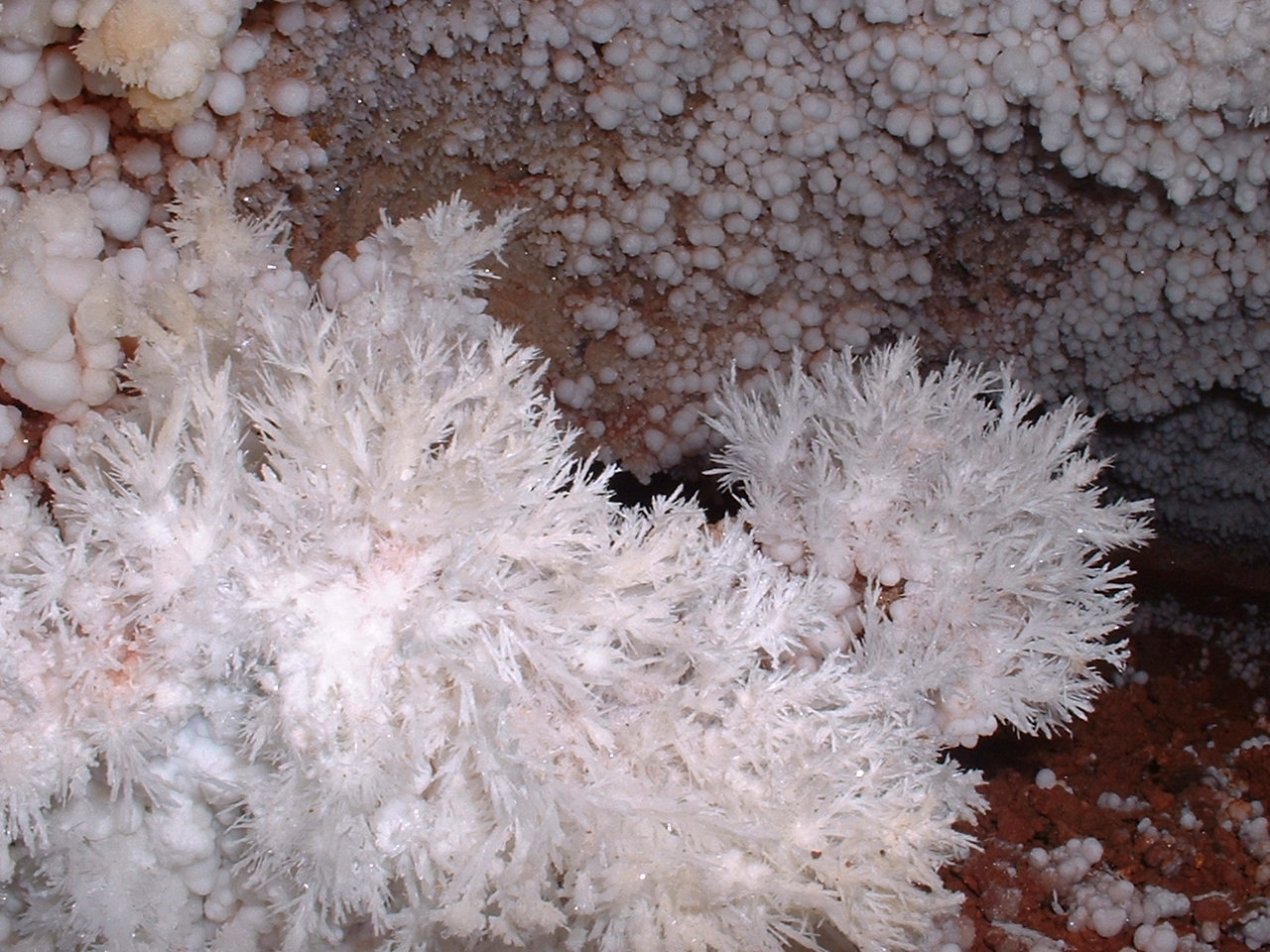
Frostwork and popcorn formations

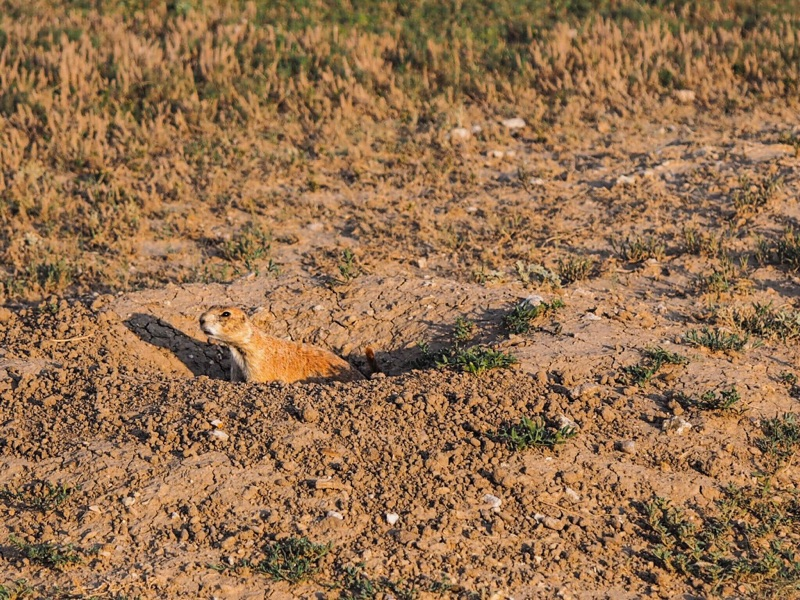
A prairie dog; part of an extensive colony in the park

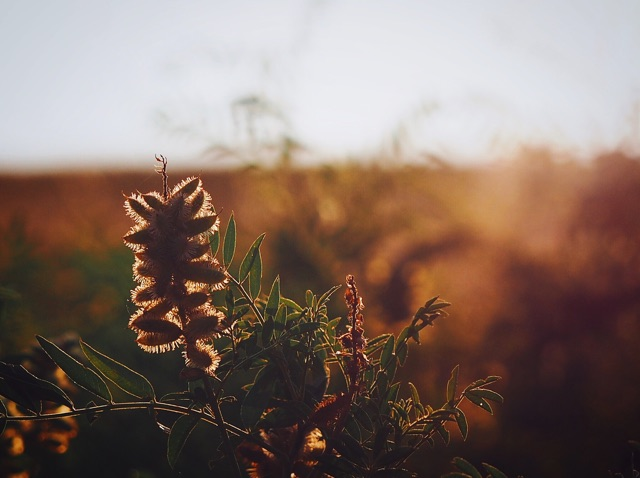
Flora of the prairie

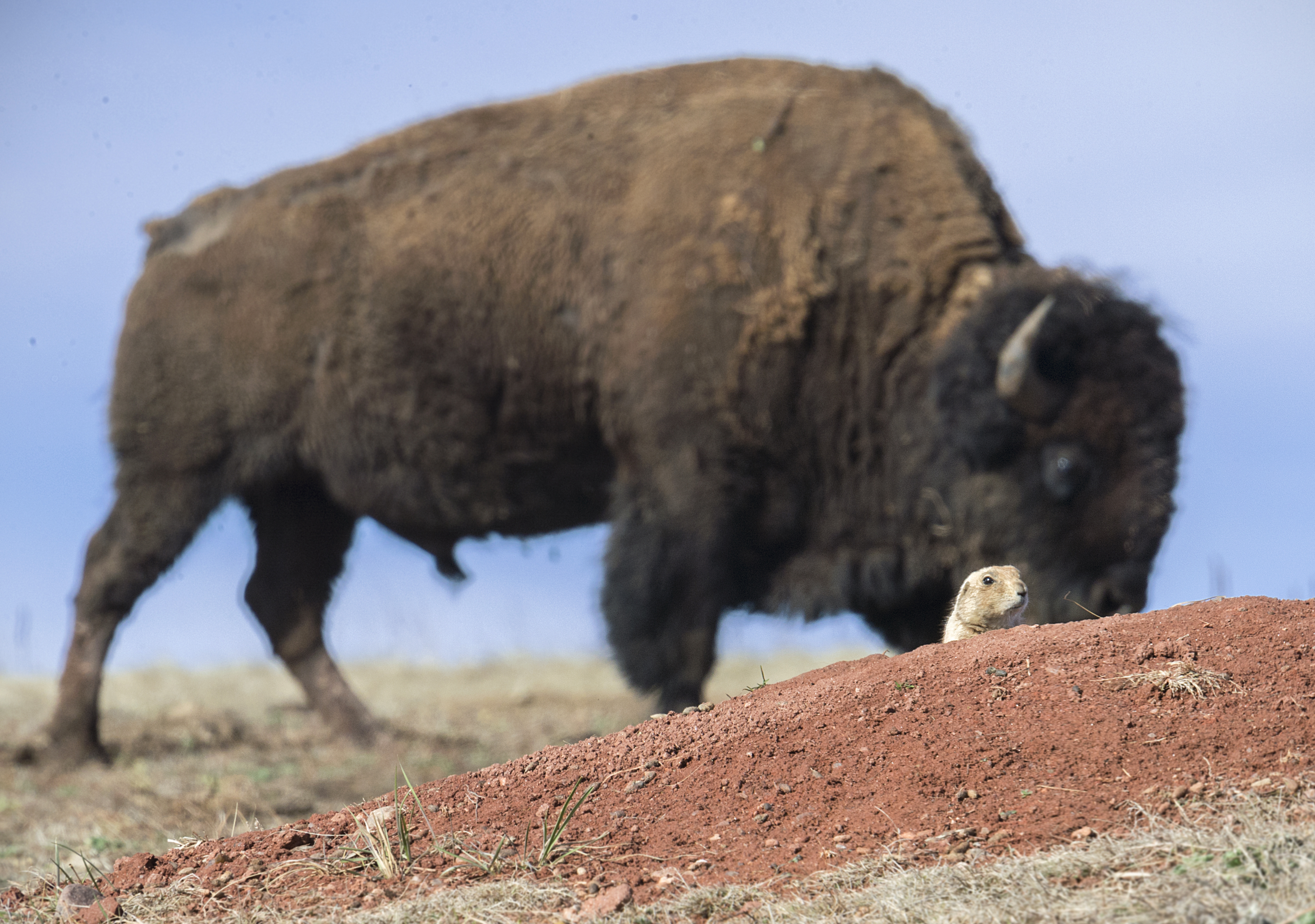
Bison and prairie dogs are commonplace in the park.

== See also ==
- List of national parks of the United States
- Carlsbad Caverns National Park
- Jewel Cave National Monument
- Great Basin National Park (Lehman Caves)
- Lava Beds National Monument (lava tubes)
- Mammoth Cave National Park
- Oregon Caves National Monument
- Russell Cave National Monument
- Timpanogos Cave National Monument
- List of longest caves in the United States
- List of longest caves
