= Jewel Cave National Monument =

Cave in the Black Hills of South Dakota, USA

- IUCN category III (natural monument or feature)
- The Inner Sanctum, one of the longest and largest passageways along the Scenic Tour

- Location within South Dakota Location within the United States
- Interactive map of Jewel Cave National Monument
- Location: Custer County, South Dakota, U.S.
- Nearest city: Custer, South Dakota
- Coordinates: 43°43′46″N 103°49′46″W
- Area: 1,273 acres (5.15 km^{2})
- Created: February 7, 1908
- Visitors: 145,332 (in 2024)
- Governing body: National Park Service
- Website: Jewel Cave National Monument

Jewel Cave National Monument contains Jewel Cave, currently the fifth longest cave in the world and second longest cave in the United States, with 220.33 miles (354.59 km) of mapped passageways as of July 2025. It is located approximately 13 miles (21 km) west of the town of Custer in the Black Hills of South Dakota.

Jewel Cave became a national monument in 1908, becoming the first national monument established for the protection and preservation of a cave. In addition to its length, the cave is significant for being one of the best known examples of a breathing cave, in which changes in outside air pressure cause air to flow into and out of the cave. Jewel Cave is named for the calcite crystals that cover many of its walls.

== Mission ==
The monument's mission is stated in its foundation document:

The purpose of Jewel Cave National Monument is to preserve, protect, and interpret one of the last great frontiers by managing and exploring an extensive cave system and the overlying surface for continued scientific and personal interest, and for inspiring public discovery.

== History ==
Frank and Albert Michaud, two local prospectors, discovered the cave in 1900, when they felt cold air blowing out of a small hole in a canyon. It is unknown whether any previous inhabitants of the area were aware of the natural cave opening, which was not large enough for a person to enter.

After enlarging the cave entrance with dynamite, the Michaud brothers found a cavern lined with calcite crystals, which led them to name it "Jewel Cave". The brothers tried to capitalize on the discovery, widening the opening, building walkways inside, and opening it to tourists. Although their venture was unsuccessful and they had to sell their mining claim back to the government, news of the discovery eventually reached Washington. President Theodore Roosevelt proclaimed Jewel Cave a national monument on February 7, 1908. The area around the natural entrance to the cave was further developed by the Civilian Conservation Corps in the 1930s. The National Park Service assumed management of the monument from the United States Forest Service in 1933 and began offering tours in 1939.

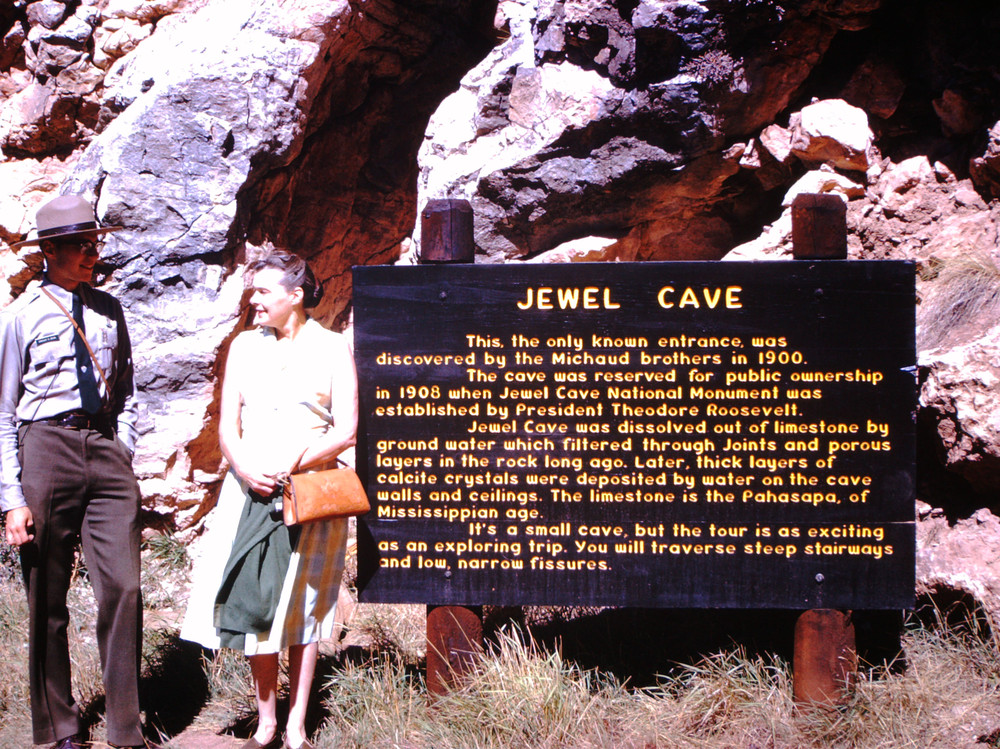
A mid-century visitor to Jewel Cave

As recently as 1959, less than 2 miles (3.2 km) of passageway had been discovered. That year, however, Jan and Herb Conn, local rock climbers, began exploring, and within two years had mapped 15 miles (24 km).

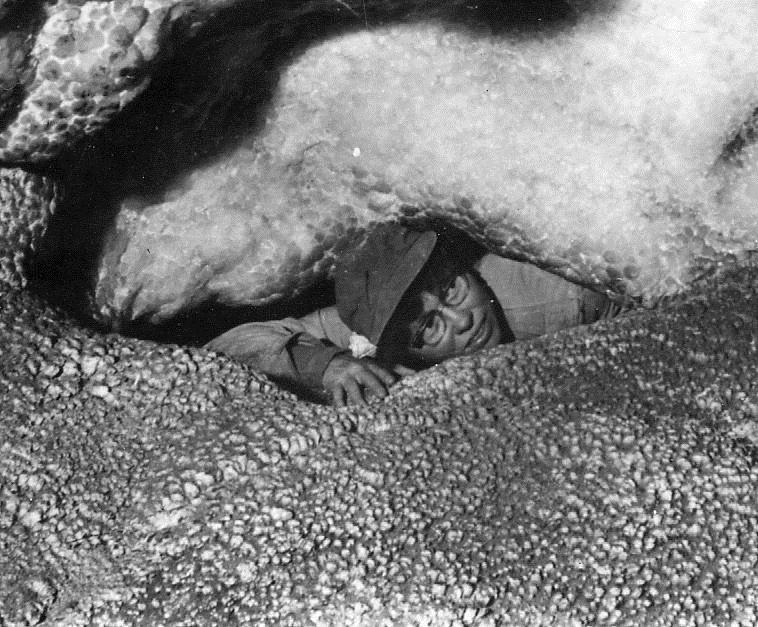
Jan Conn exploring Jewel Cave in 1959

Much of the new discoveries lay outside the boundaries of the monument, under land managed by the Forest Service. The two agencies performed a land swap in 1965, establishing the present boundaries of the park and enabling the development of a new part of the cave. The National Park Service sunk a 300 feet (91 m) elevator shaft to a previously remote cave area, and built concrete walks and metal stairs and platforms along a half-mile loop. The "Scenic Tour" was opened in 1972. Most modern-day visitors tour that part of the cave.

In August 2000, the Jasper Fire, an 83,000 acres (340 km^{2}) forest fire, burned 90% of the monument and the surrounding area. The visitor center and historic buildings were spared.

== Exploration ==
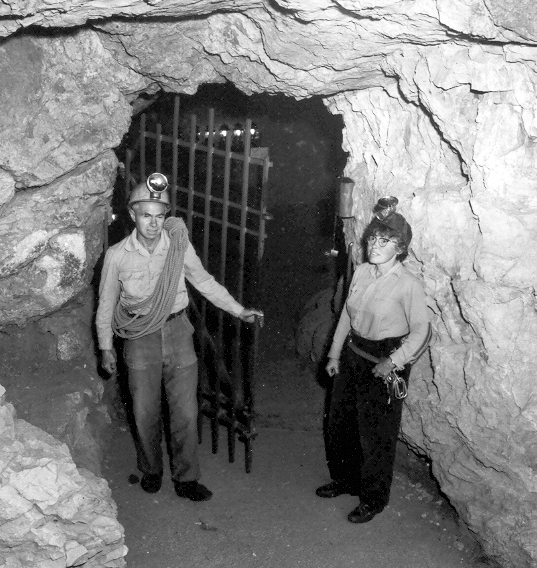
Herb and Jan Conn at Jewel Cave in 1959

By 1979, Jan and Herb Conn had discovered, named, and mapped more than 64 miles (103 km) of passages. Although they largely retired from caving by the early 1980s, exploration has continued unabated. Because the areas being explored take many hours to reach, explorers now sometimes camp in the cave during expeditions of as long as four days. Three permanent camps have been established at various locations within the cave. Today the cave is mapped by traditional survey techniques, using compasses, clinometers, and lasers instead of tape measures.

Location of the cave with respect to regional Black Hills geology

Its over 220 miles (350 km) of mapped passageway make Jewel Cave the fifth longest cave in the world, after the Mammoth Cave System in Kentucky, Sistema Ox Bel Ha and Sistema Sac Actun, both in the Yucatán Peninsula (Mexico), and Shuanghedong Cave Network in China. All currently known passages of Jewel Cave fit within a 4 square miles (10 km^{2}) surface area. The elevation range of the cave is 822 feet (251 m), with its deepest known point approximately 600 feet (180 m) below the surface. The largest room discovered in Jewel Cave is the Big Duh, which is 570 feet (170 m) long and averages 90–180 feet (27–55 m) wide and 30 feet (9.1 m) high.

The discovered areas in the cave account for only about 3–5% of the estimated total air volume of the cave, which is believed to be roughly 8 billion cubic feet (230 million cubic meters). This puts estimates for the total length somewhere between roughly 4,400 miles (7,100 km) and 7,300 miles (11,700 km). The cave volume is estimated by measuring the amount of air that the cave "exhales" when the outside air pressure drops and "inhales" when the outside air pressure rises.

== Geology ==
Jewel Cave is a solutional cave formed primarily in limestone. Most of the cave formed within the Pahasapa Formation deposited during the Mississippian, approximately 350 million years ago. The later limestones, sandstones, and shales deposited in these Paleozoic and Mesozoic seas, known collectively as the Minnelusa Formation, were eroded with the geologic uplift associated with Laramide Orogeny and the formation of the Black Hills. The main passages of the cave then formed in the early Cenozoic. Uplift continued in the Late Pliocene or Early Pleistocene, lowering the water table and draining the cave.

Jewel Cave passages follow a pattern of joint development. The faults and joints are associated with the uplift of the Black Hills approximately 58 to 54 million years ago. After main cave dissolution, a thick layer of calcite lined the walls about 2.5 million years ago.

During cave development and afterwards, speleothems and speleogens formed, including the "jewels" or spar. Other examples include stalactites, stalagmites, soda straws, flowstone, cave popcorn, boxwork, helictites, scintillites, conulites, logomites, cave pearls, rimstone, rafts, rims, vents, and frostwork. The gypsum formations include needles, beards, cotton, hair, flowers, and spiders. Finally, Jewel Cave contains a very rare formation called a hydromagnesite balloon. Those are created when gas of an unknown source inflates a pasty substance formed by the precipitation of the magnesium carbonate hydroxide mineral.

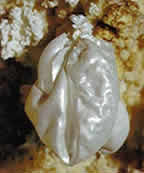
Hydromagnesite balloon in Jewel Cave

Jewel Cave is a breathing cave, which means air enters or exits the cave with changes in atmospheric pressure from day to night or due to changes in the weather. This was first explained by Herb Conn in 1966. The temperature inside the cave is 49 °F (9 °C) year-round.

Although much of Jewel Cave is dry, over a dozen underground lakes have been discovered where the cave meets the Madison Aquifer, about 600 feet (180 m) below the surface. The first of these, Hourglass Lake, was discovered in 2015.

Jewel Cave is located less than 20 miles (32 km) from Wind Cave National Park, though the caves are not believed to be connected.

== Flora and fauna ==
Jewel Cave is one of the largest bat hibernacula in the United States. Thousands of bats of ten different species live in and around the cave throughout the year, including several species which hibernate in the cave during the winter. Bat numbers have decreased significantly since 2018, when the fungus that causes white-nose syndrome was first discovered in Jewel Cave.

Other animals living on the surface include bighorn sheep, mule deer, white-tailed deer, mountain lions, coyotes, packrats, garter snakes, prairie rattlesnakes, great horned owls, blue jays, red-headed woodpeckers, western tanagers, cliff swallows, and occasional American black bears and elk.

The surface of the national monument is ponderosa pine forest.

== Access and infrastructure ==
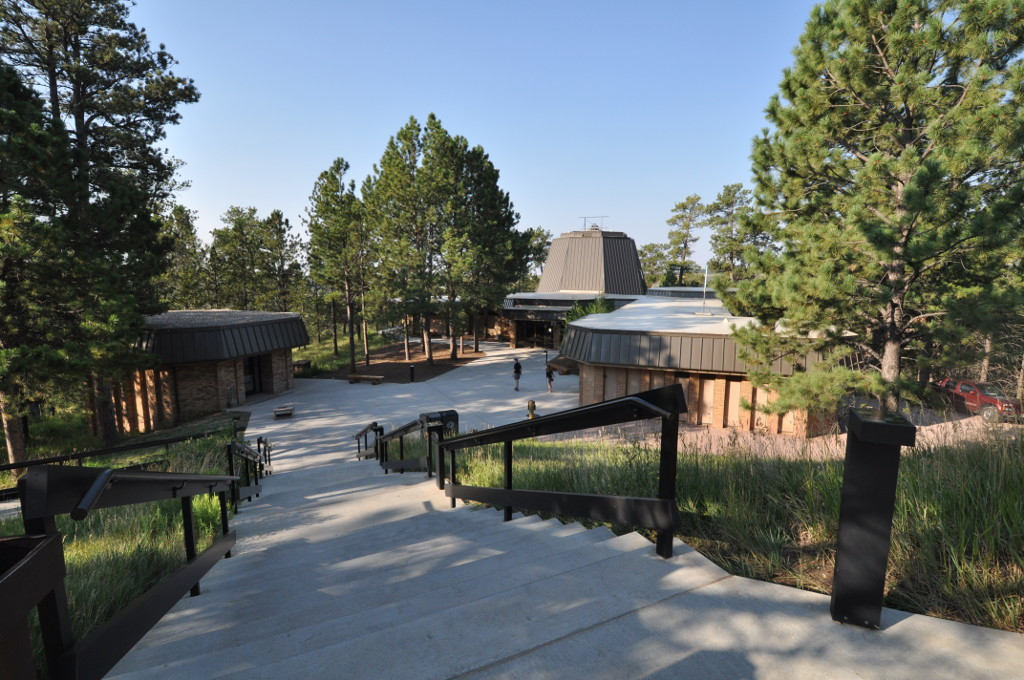
Jewel Cave National Monument's main visitor center complex

Jewel Cave is open year-round. Surface amenities include a visitor center, park theater, natural history exhibits, park store, hiking trails, and picnic areas. To enter the cave, visitors must take a ranger-guided tour. Over 145,000 people visited Jewel Cave in 2024.

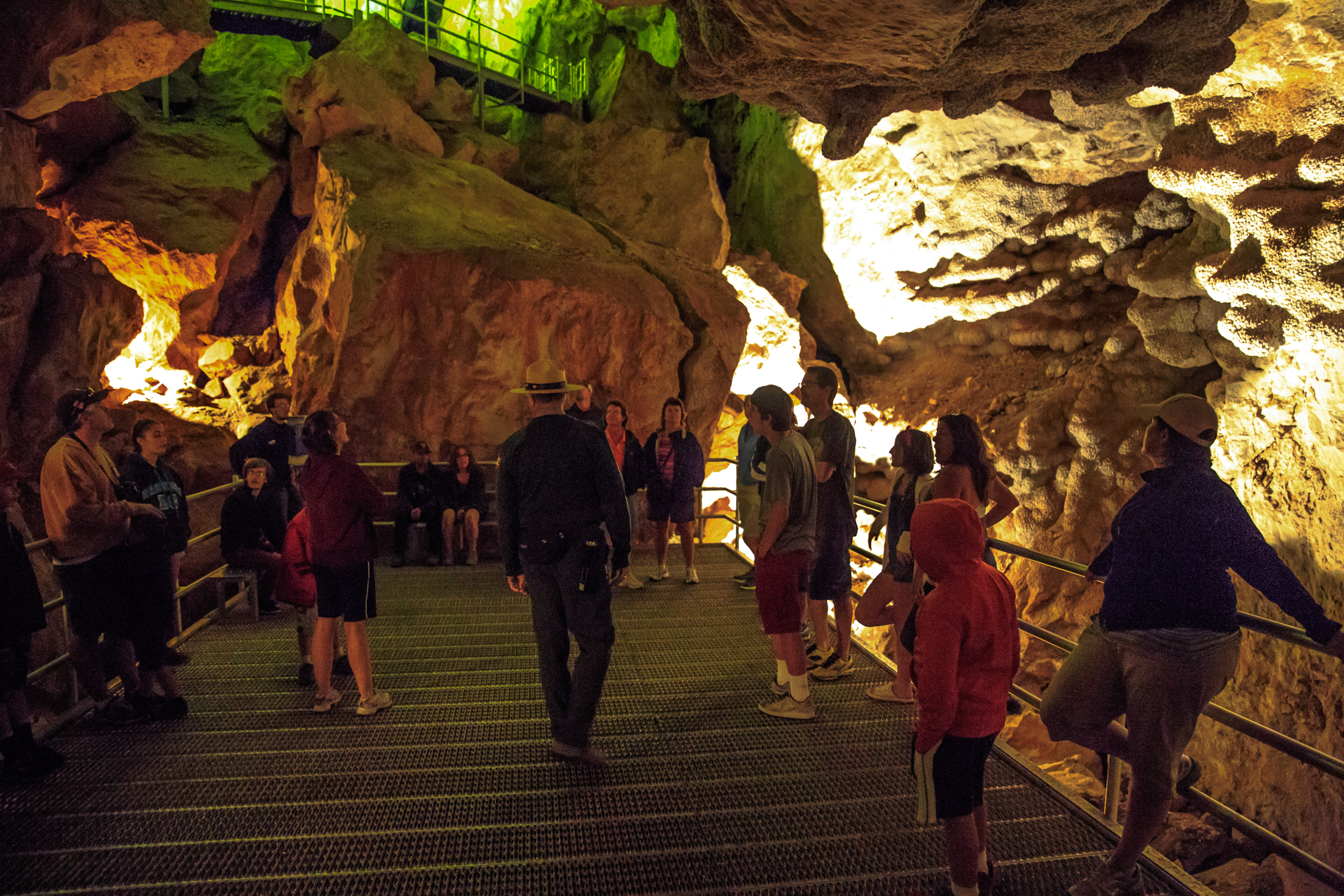
Visitors and guide inside Jewel Cave

The National Park Service offers four tours seasonally: the Scenic Tour, a half-mile loop through a paved and lighted central portion of the cave accessed by elevator; the Discovery Tour, a short accessible tour to a single, large room of the cave; the Historic Lantern Tour, a lantern-lit tour through the earliest-discovered part of the cave; and the Wild Caving Tour, through an undeveloped part of the cave near the scenic loop. The Wild Caving Tour requires visitors to squeeze through a passageway less than 9 inches (23 cm) tall.

There are two surface trails varying in length and difficulty, the longer of which takes visitors through the monument's historic area and past Jewel Cave's historic entrance. The historic trail, cave entrance, and ranger station were listed in the National Register of Historic Places in April 1995.

== Gallery ==
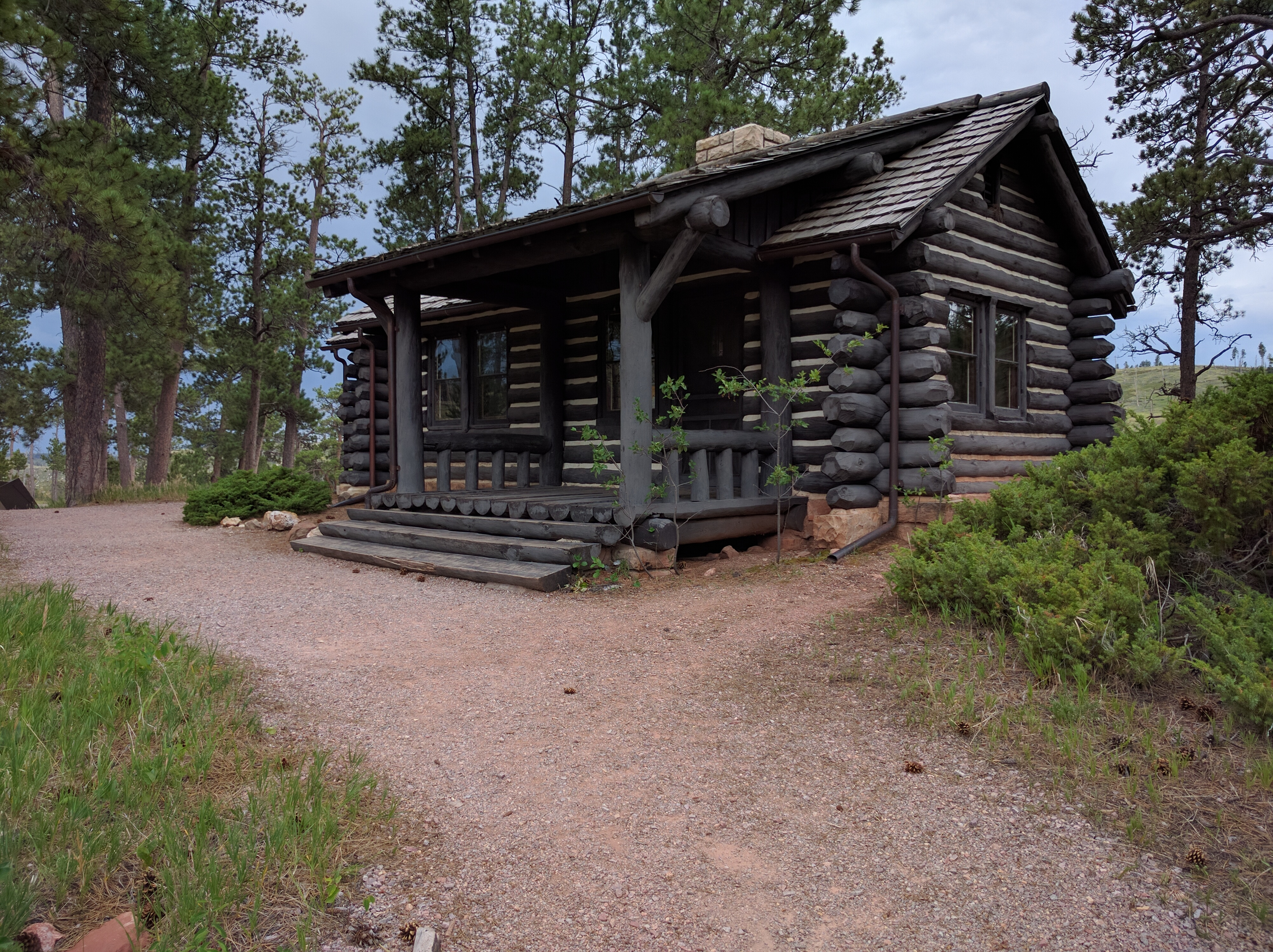
The historic visitor center, built by the Civilian Conservation Corps in the 1930s

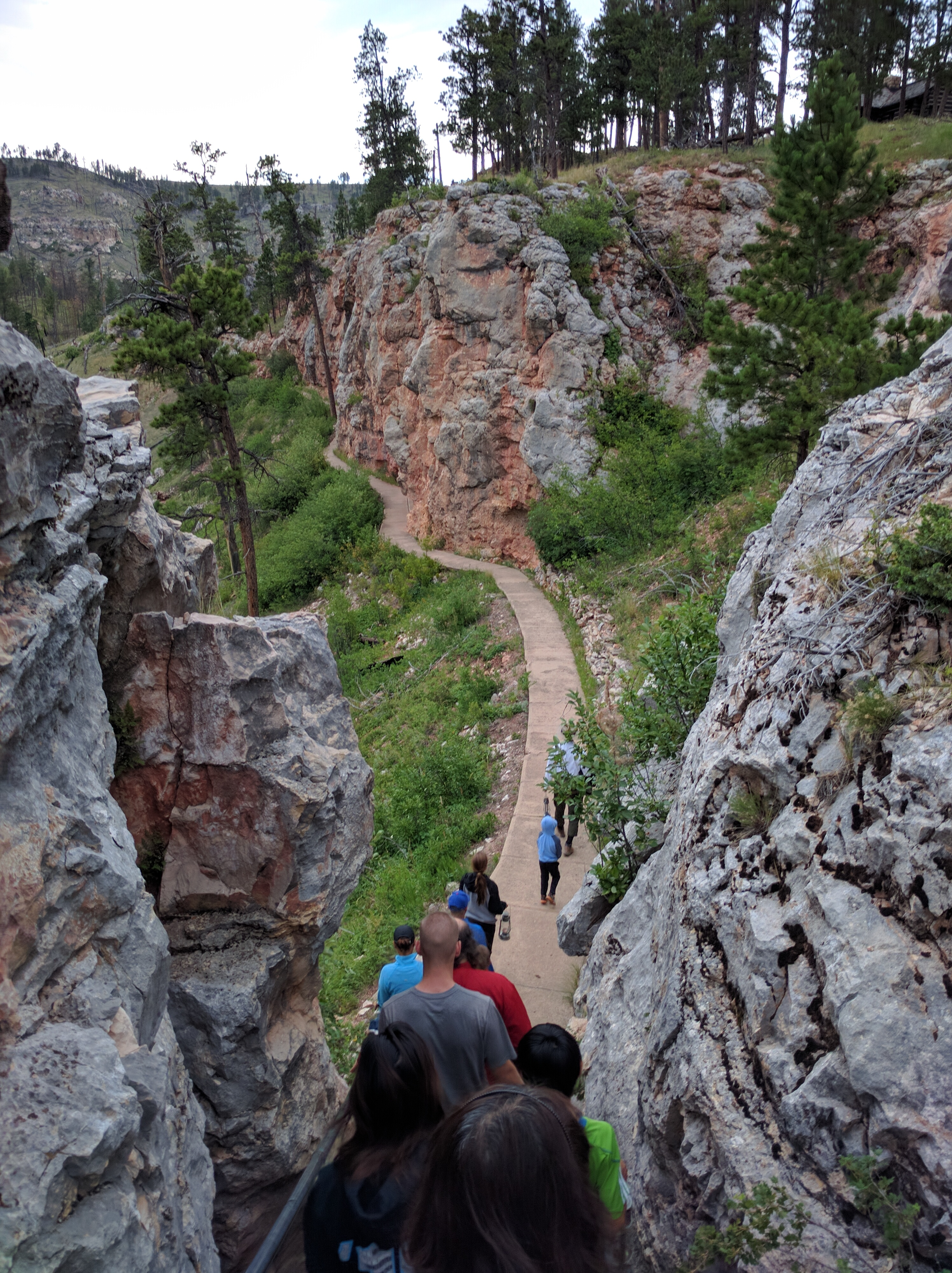
Trail to Jewel Cave's historic entrance

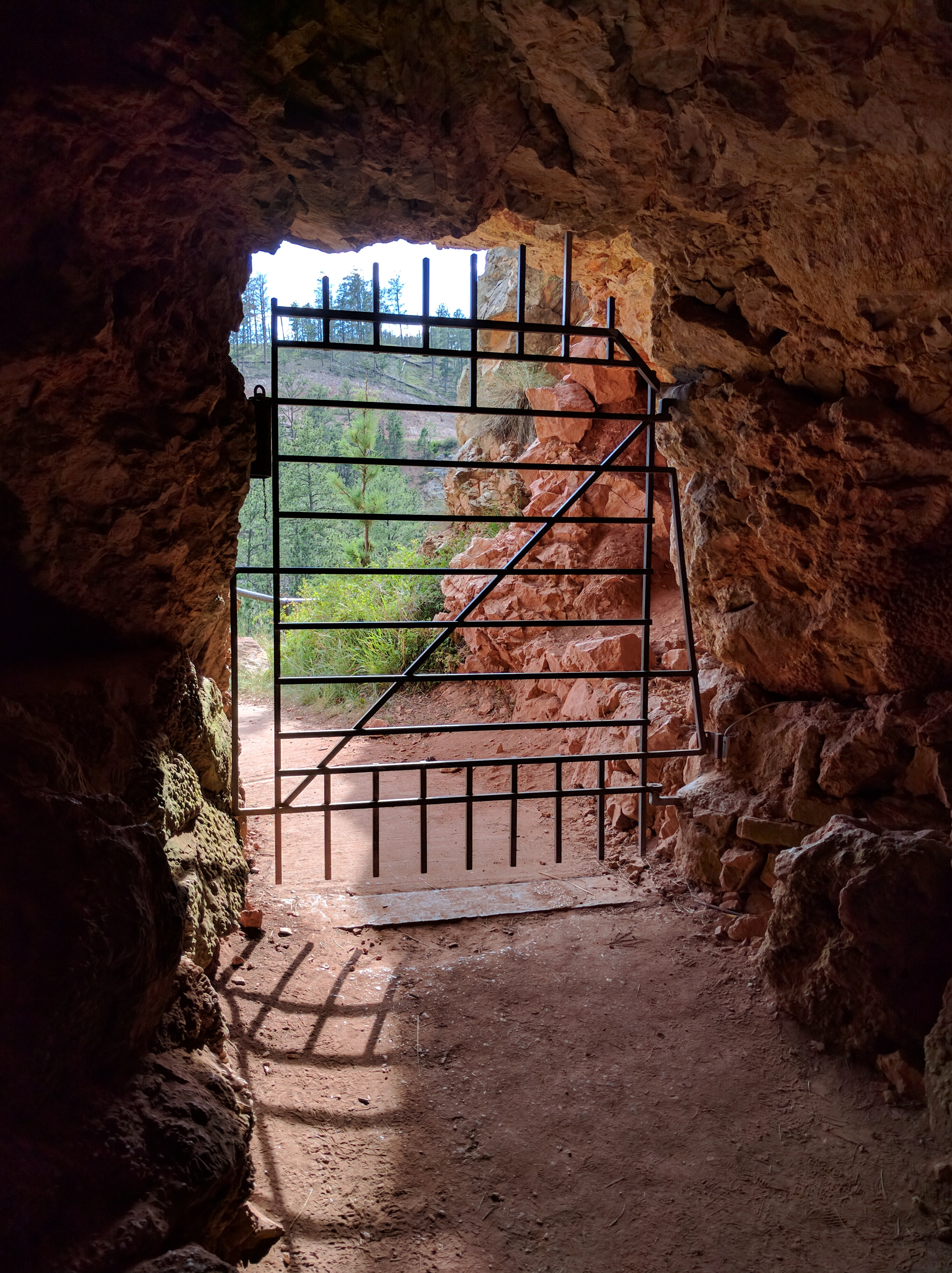
Interior view of Jewel Cave's historic entrance

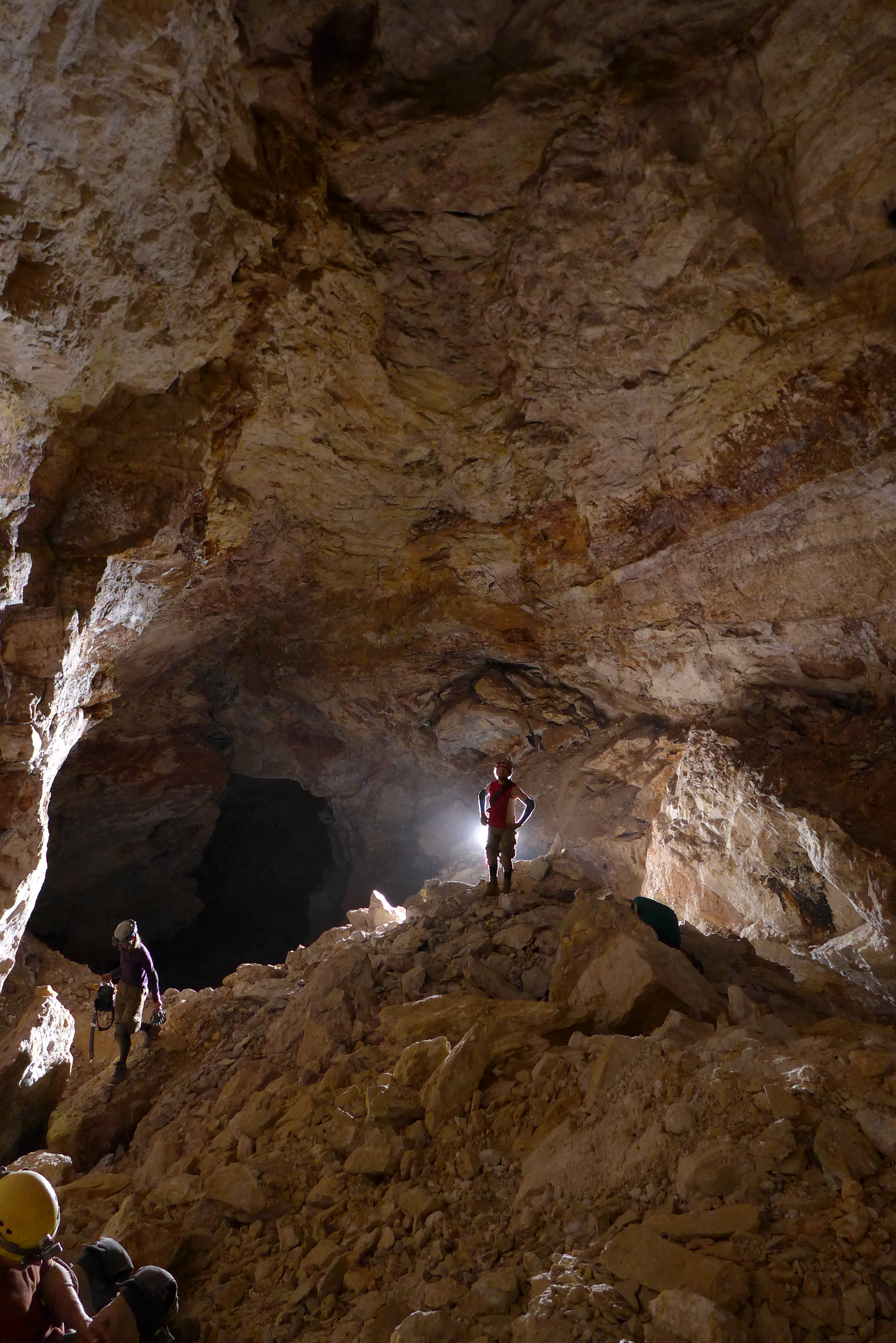
The Crushing Deep, one of the deepest known parts of Jewel Cave

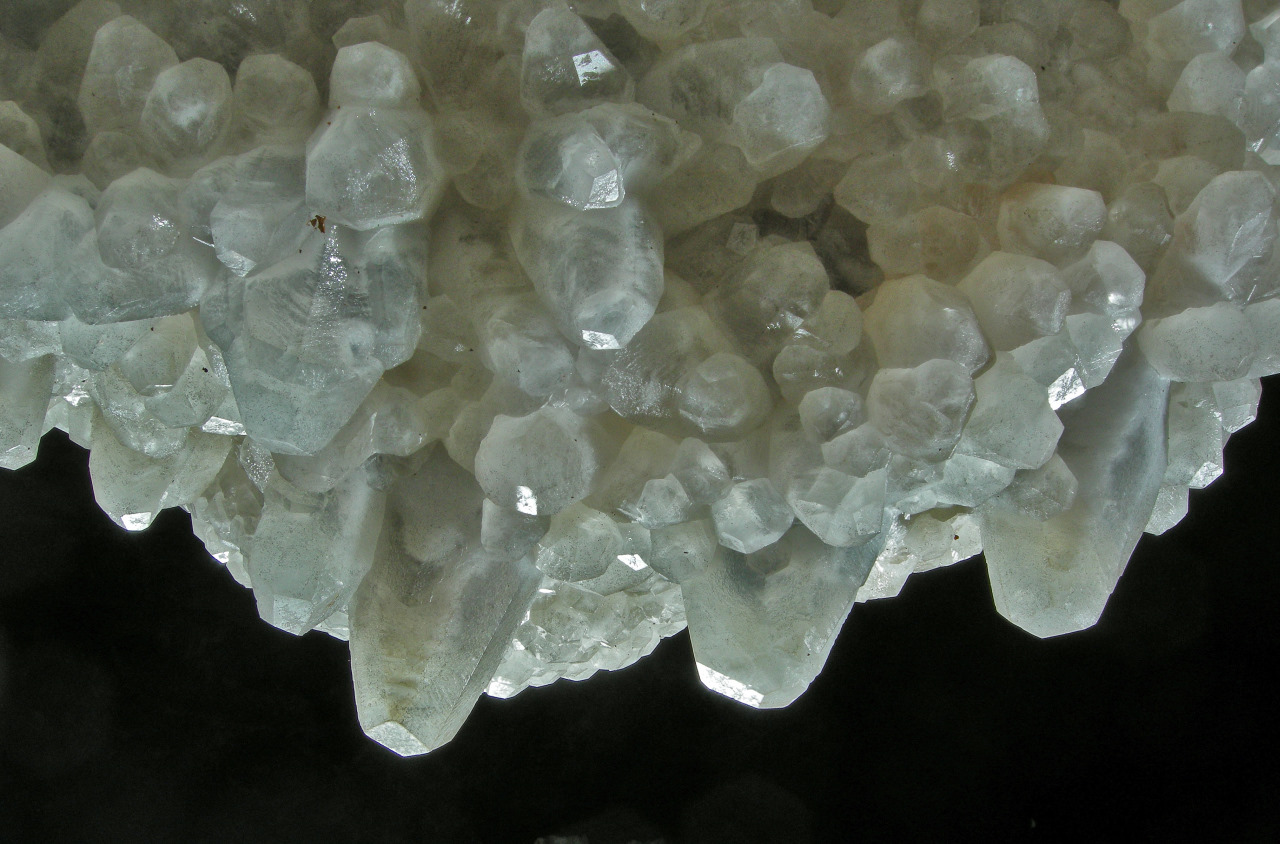
Much of Jewel Cave is covered with calcite spar crystals, but they are rarely as clear as this cluster.

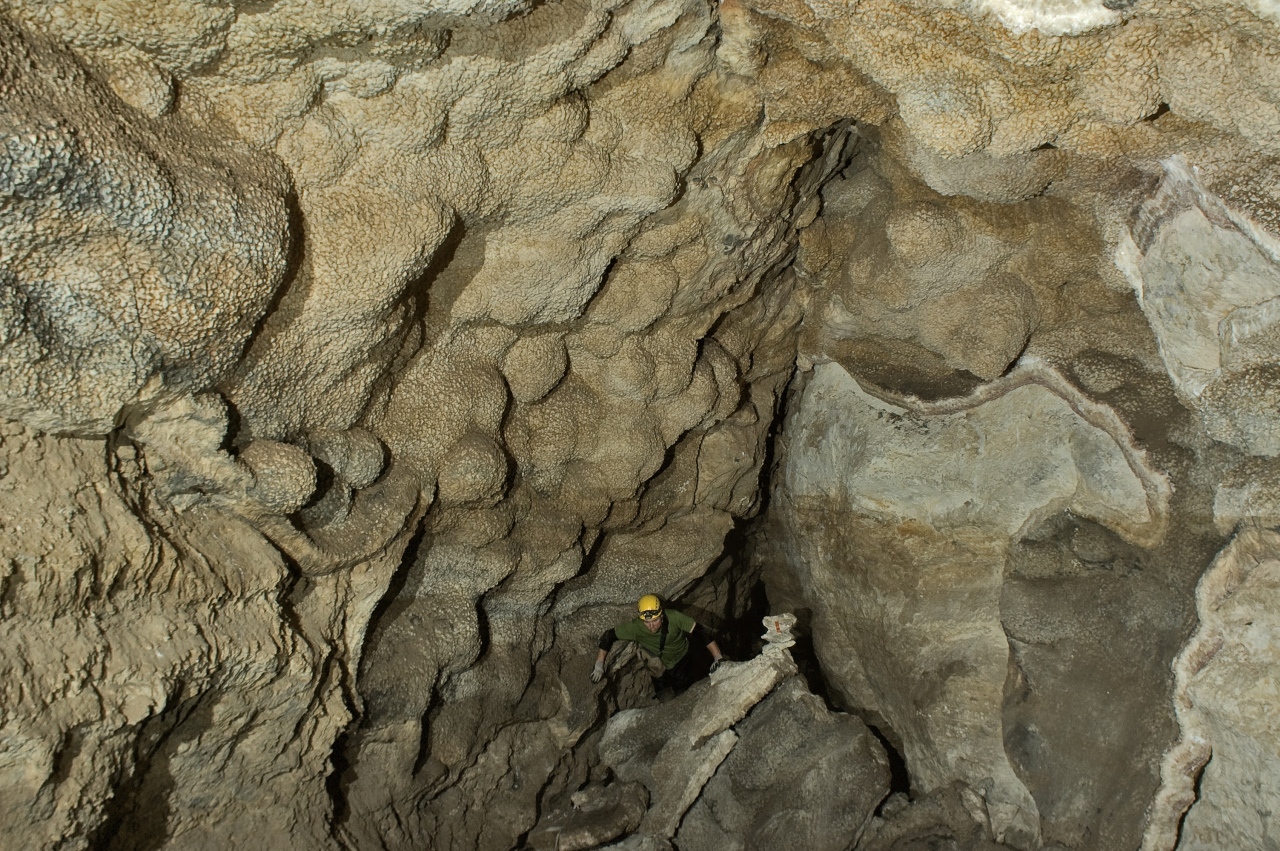
Calcite crystals cover much of the walls in some sections of the cave. Typically they are a dull brown color as in this room.

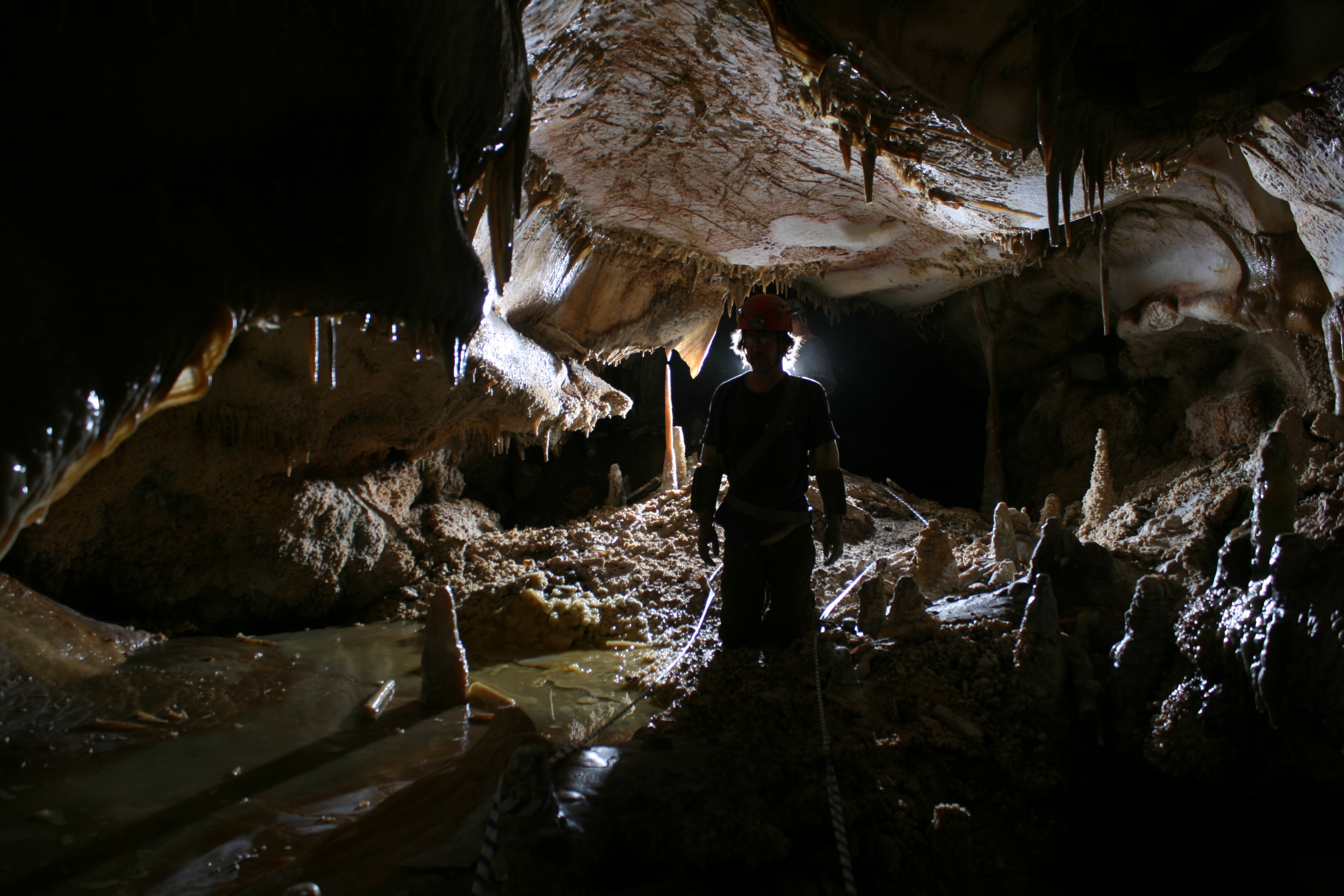
Jewel Cave is mainly a dry cave, but areas with "wet" formations such as these stalagmites and stalactites do exist.

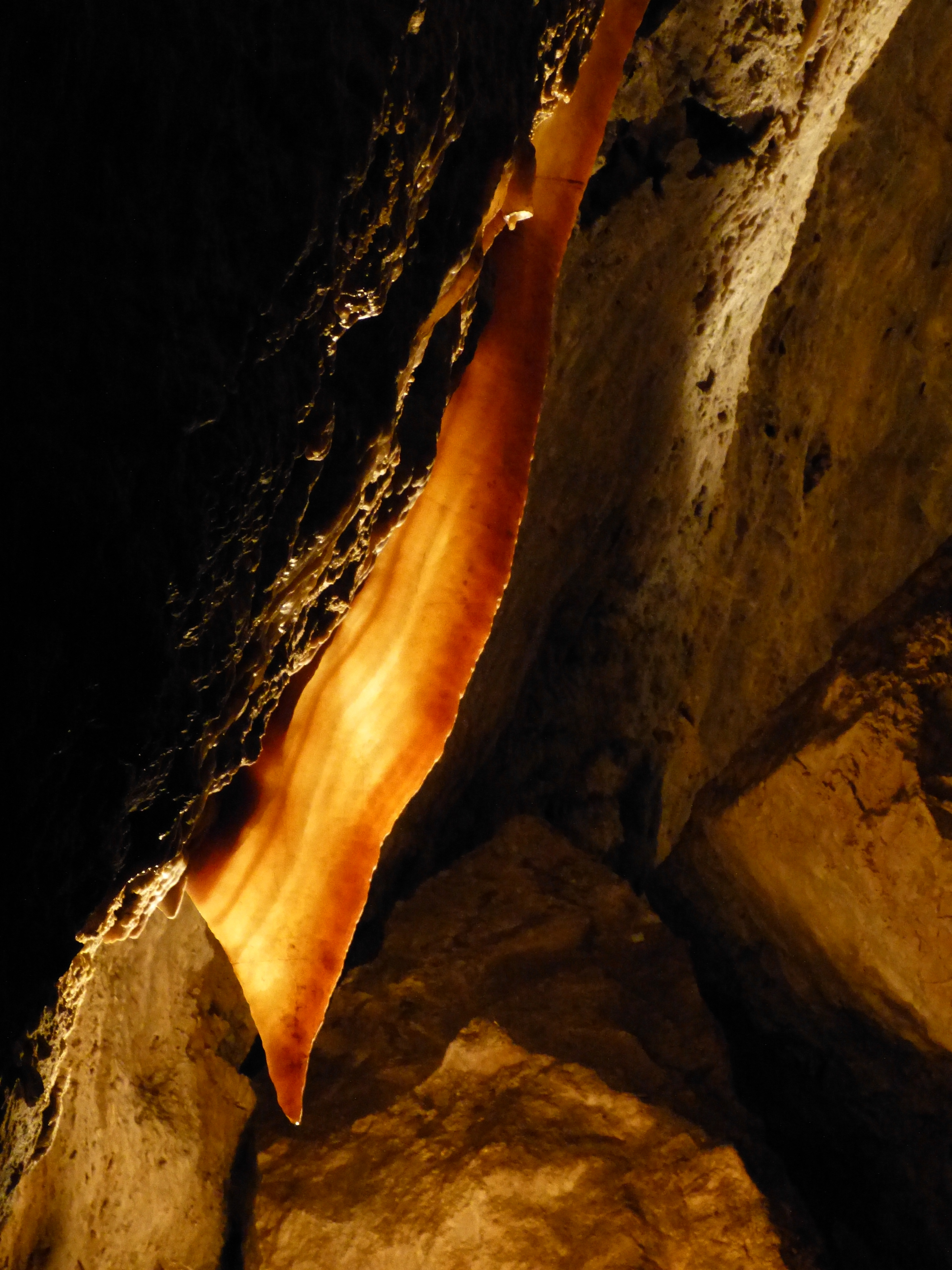
Cave bacon, a type of drapery seen on the Scenic Tour

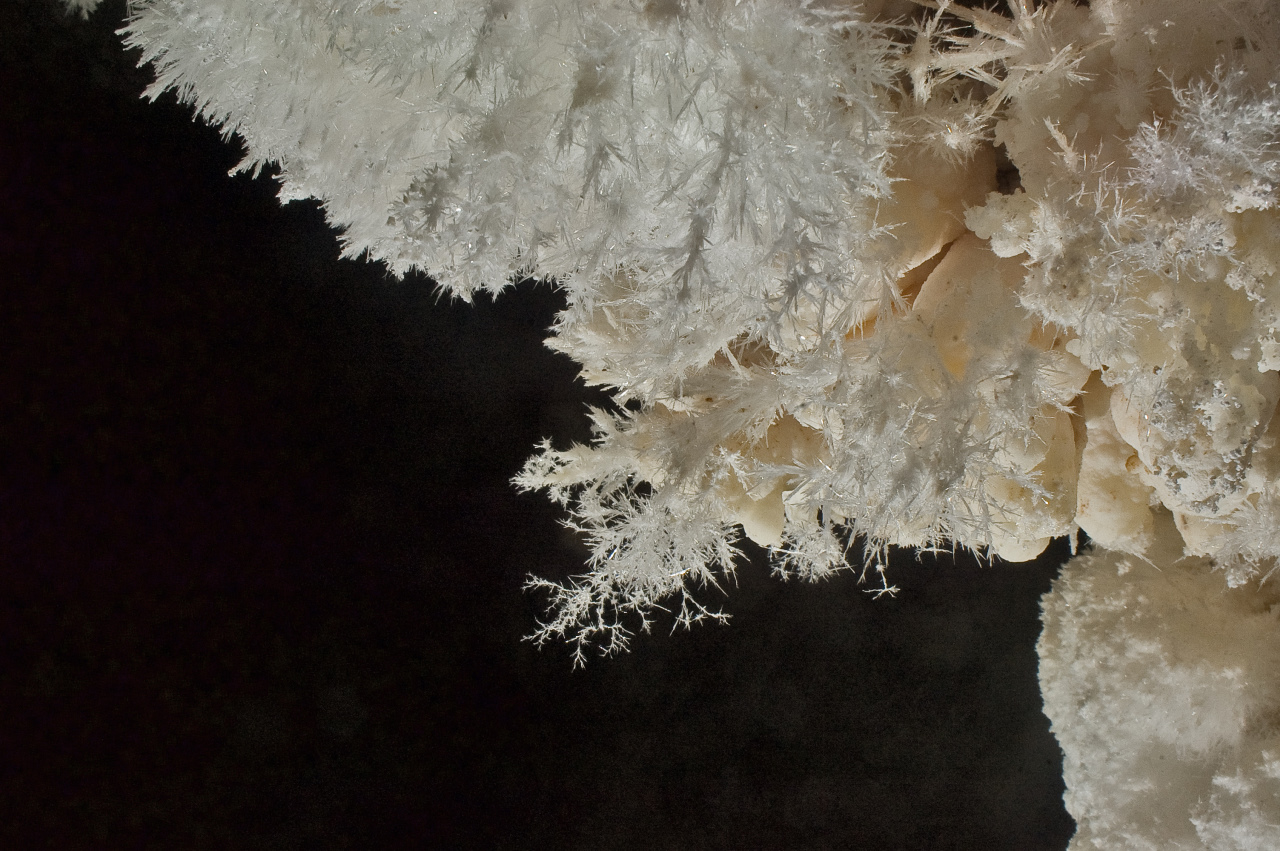
Aragonite frostwork is another speleothem found throughout the cave, typically in small crusts on the walls.

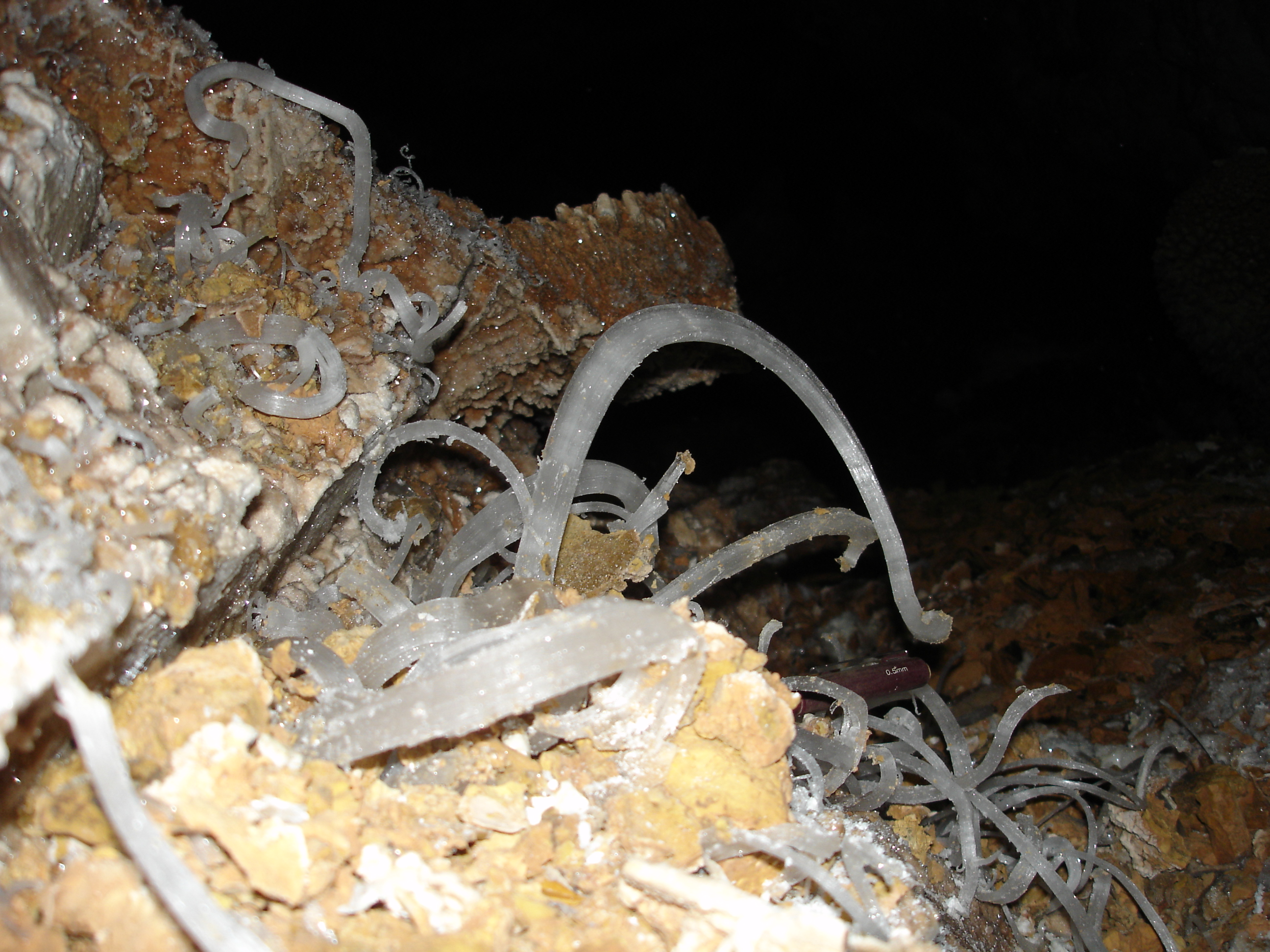
Gypsum flowers are typically only found in dry areas of Jewel Cave.

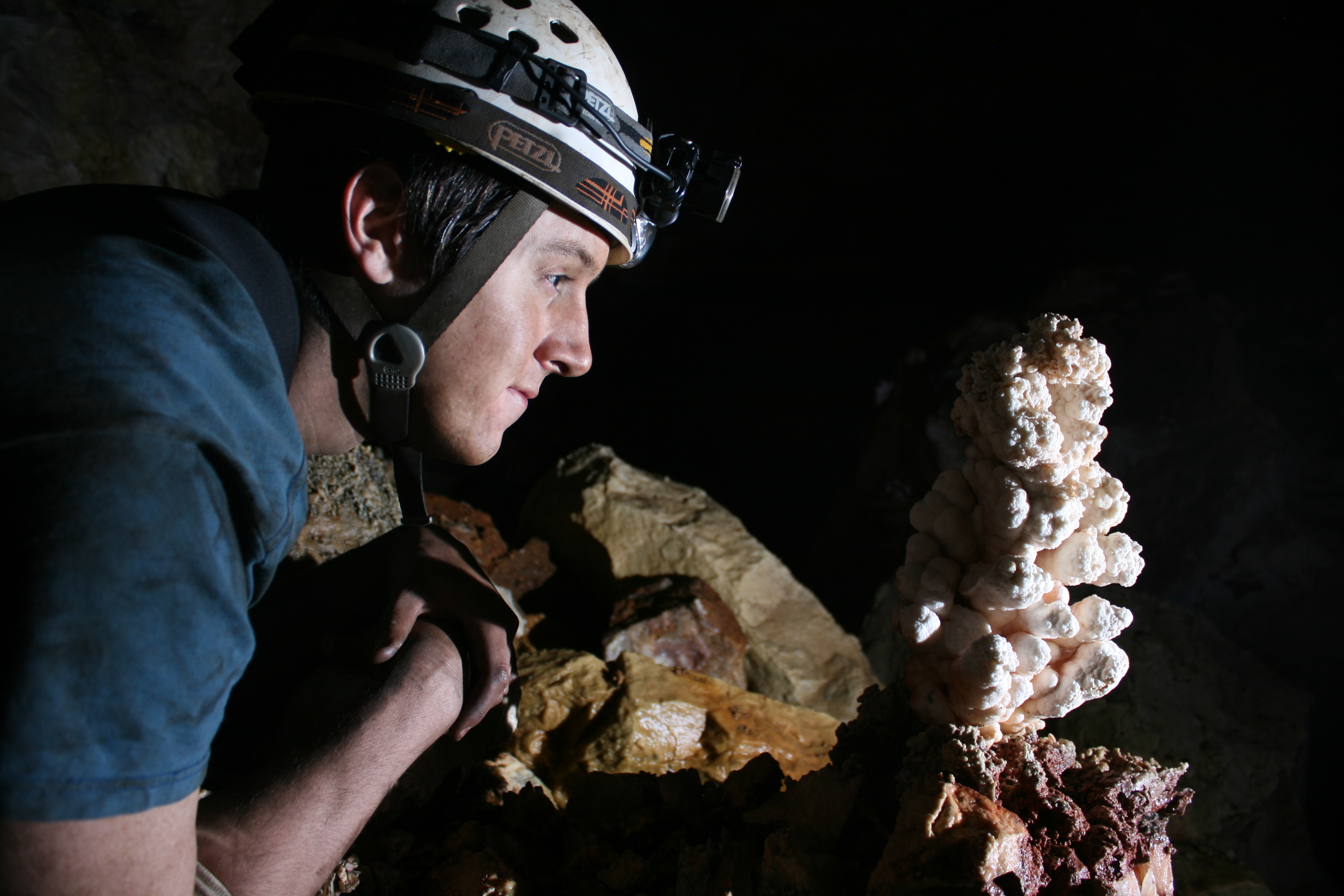
A caver looks at a cave formation called a logomite.

== See also ==
- Lehman Caves
- Mammoth Cave National Park
- Oregon Caves National Monument and Preserve
- Russell Cave National Monument
- Speleology
- Timpanogos Cave National Monument
- Wind Cave National Park
- List of caves
- List of longest caves
  - List of longest caves in the United States
- List of national monuments of the United States
