= Frostwork (geology) =

Snowflake-like speleothem

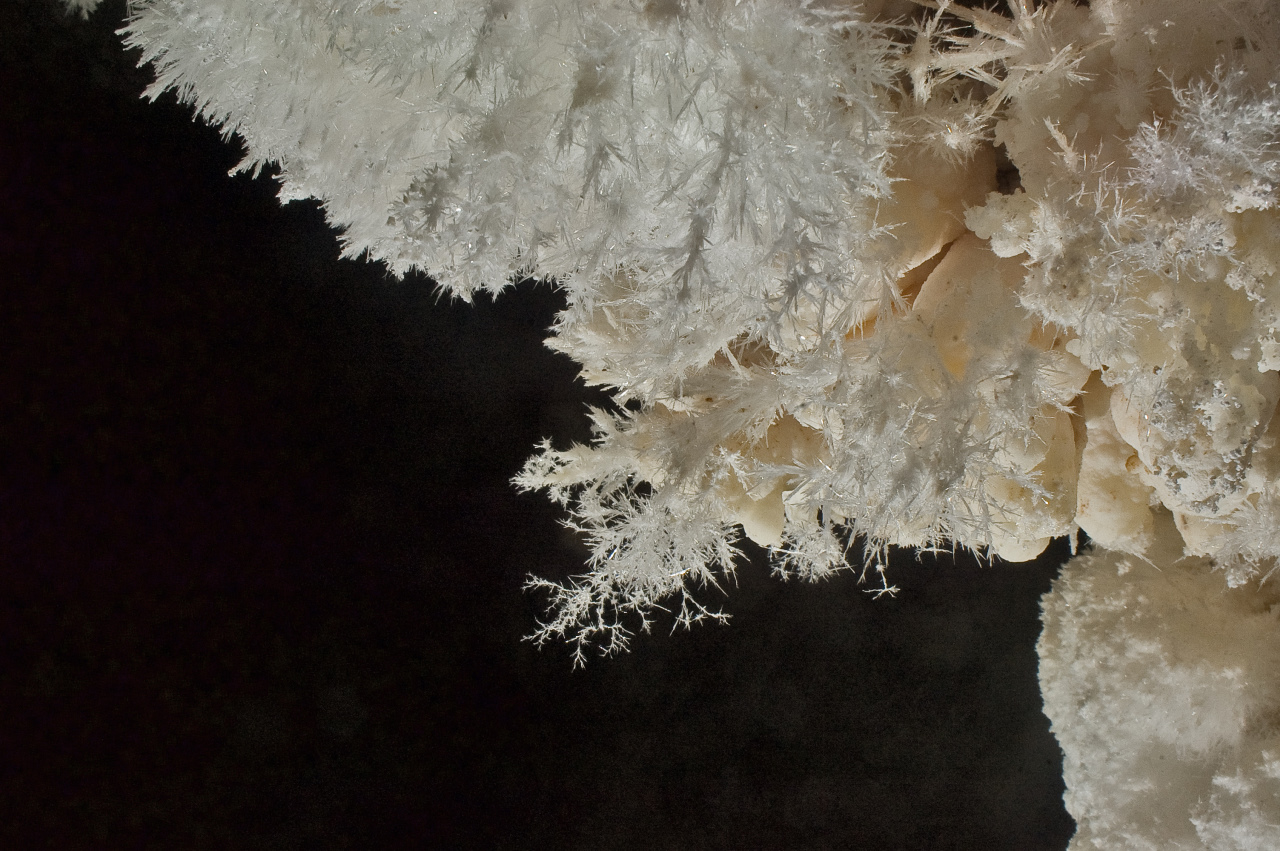
Frostwork in Jewel Cave, South Dakota.

In geology, frostwork is a type of speleothem with acicular ("needle-like") growths almost always composed of aragonite (a polymorph of calcite) or calcite replaced aragonite. It is a variety of anthodite. Frostwork can also be made of opal or gypsum. In some caves frostwork may grow on top of cave popcorn or boxwork.

== Formation ==
The origin of frostwork is somewhat controversial. Formation of cave frostwork has been attributed to moist, circulating air which, containing dissolved calcium carbonate, drifted against rock surfaces and coated them with the delicate crystals. Frostwork has also been attributed to water seepage from cave passageways in which there are relatively high evaporation rates.

== Occurrence ==
Notable frostwork deposits are found in a number of caves in the Black Hills region of South Dakota, US, most notable in Wind Cave National Park and Jewel Cave National Monument and Timpanogos Cave in Utah. Perhaps the most extensive displays known are found in Lechuguilla Cave, New Mexico, US.

== Gallery ==
Diagram of dripstone cave structures (frostwork labelled AA)

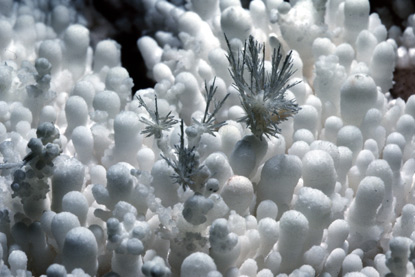
Cave popcorn with frostwork
