= Breathing cave =

Type of cave

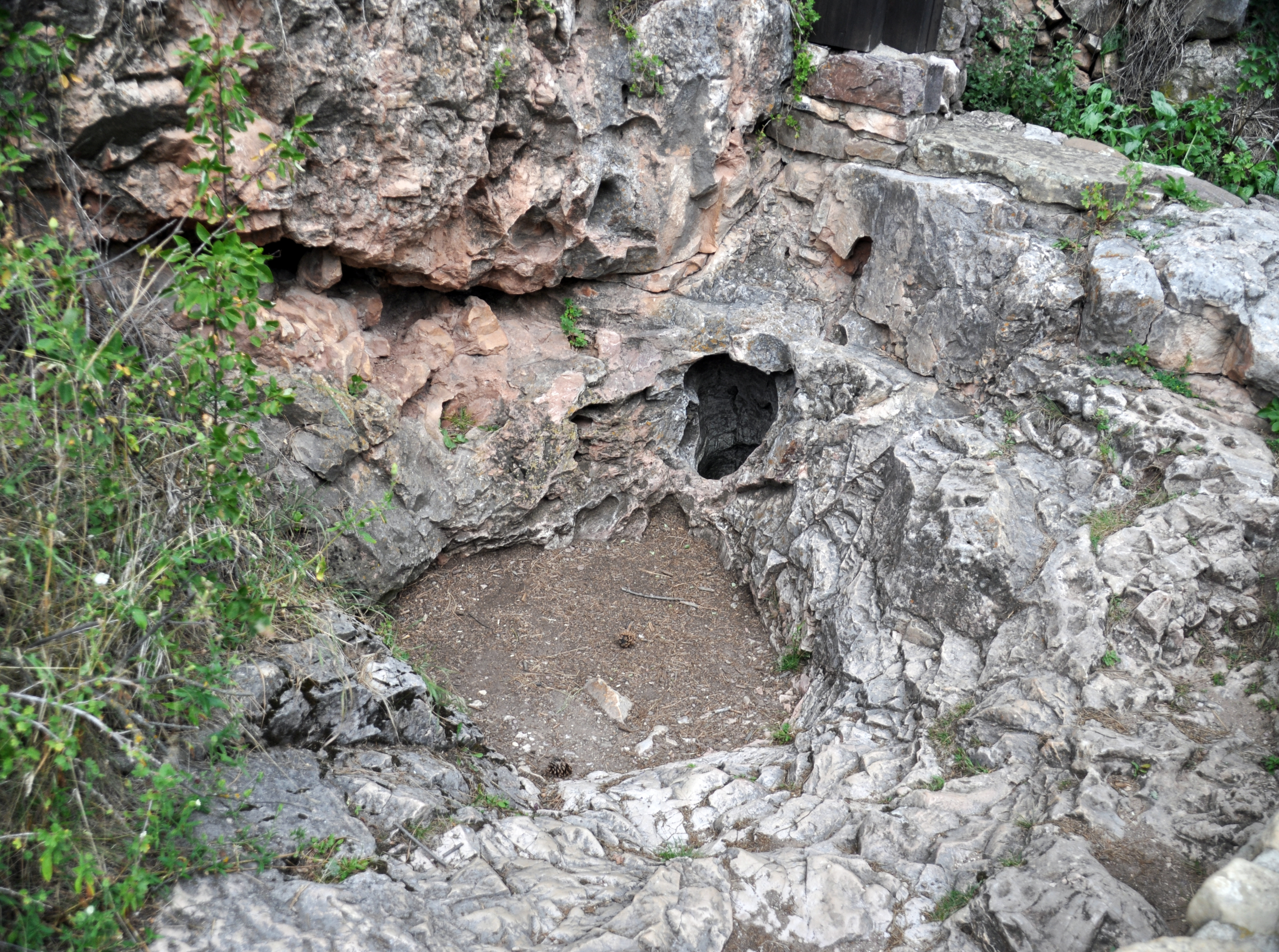
The entrance of Wind Cave in South Dakota, US

A breathing cave or barometric cave is a rare type of cave in which atmospheric pressure gradients between the inside and outside of a cave cause air to flow in to or out of the cave. The concept of air flowing through a cave is common, but in most caves this airflow is caused by a difference in temperature rather than air pressure; in barometric caves the thermal mechanism inside the cave is not great enough to cause such airflow. The speed of the airflow in barometric caves is directly correlated with the atmospheric pressure difference between the inside and outside of the cave. When the air pressure outside of the cave is higher than that inside the cave air blows into the cave and vice versa; if the air pressures are at equilibrium there is no airflow.

In some breathing caves, the airflow can only be meaningfully measured near the entrance. This tends to be the case in caves which primarily feature large, wide passageways, notably Wind Cave in South Dakota, US, and Lechuguilla Cave in New Mexico, US. In caves which mainly consist of narrow passageways, such as Jewel Cave, also in South Dakota and less than 30 kilometers (19 mi) away from Wind Cave (though the caves are not connected), airflow can be measured in many areas throughout the cave system. The barometric theory of the airflow in Jewel and Wind Caves was first noted by Herb Conn in 1966. Jewel Cave and Wind Cave are the most well-documented examples of breathing caves.

== Geology ==
All known breathing caves are solutional caves, and breathing caves tend to be much longer than most other caves. Four of the ten longest caves in the world are breathing caves (namely Jewel Cave, Wind Cave, Clearwater Cave, and Lechiguilla Cave).

Some examples of breathing caves include:

- Butler Cave, Virginia, United States
- Cave of the Winds, Colorado, United States
- Clearwater Cave, Malaysia
- Jewel Cave, South Dakota, United States
- Lechuguilla Cave, New Mexico, United States
- Peștera Vântului, Romania
- Postojna Cave, Slovenia
- Wind Cave, South Dakota, United States
