= Minnekahta Formation =

Geologic formation in Wyoming, United States

- Stratigraphic range: Permian
- Type: Formation
- Underlies: Spearfish Formation
- Overlies: Opeche Shale

Lithology
- Primary: limestone

Location
- Region: Wyoming, South Dakota
- Country: United States

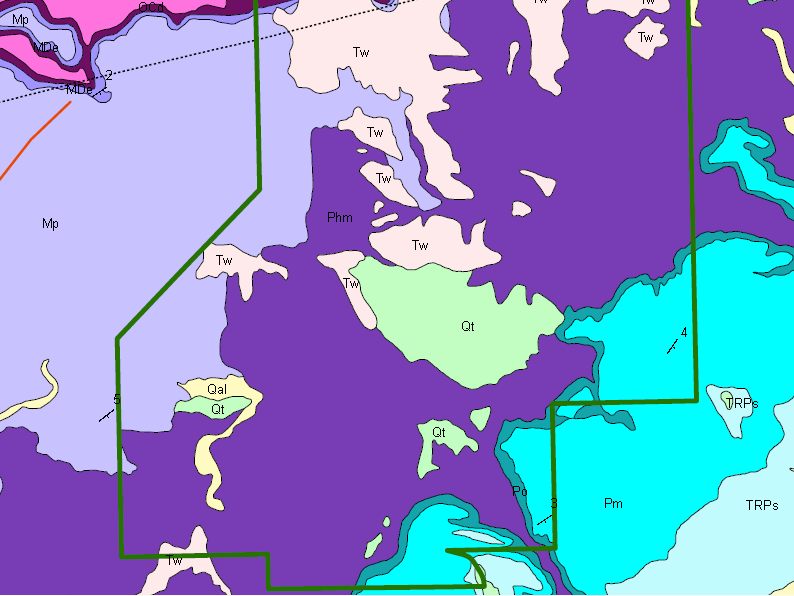
Minnekahta Formation (here:Pm) on Wind Cave National Park map, South Dakota

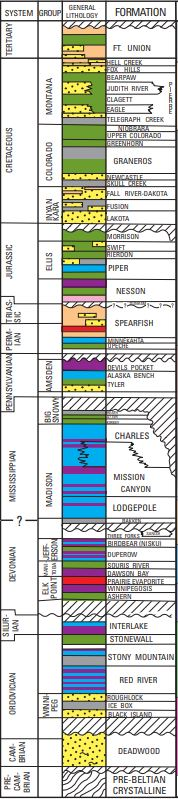
Minnekahta Formation within Williston Basin stratigraphic column

The Minnekahta Formation is a geologic formation in Wyoming, United States. It preserves fossils dating back to the Permian period.

== See also ==
- List of fossiliferous stratigraphic units in Wyoming
- Paleontology in Wyoming
