= Spearfish Formation =

Geologic formation in the United States

- Stratigraphic range: Permian–Triassic
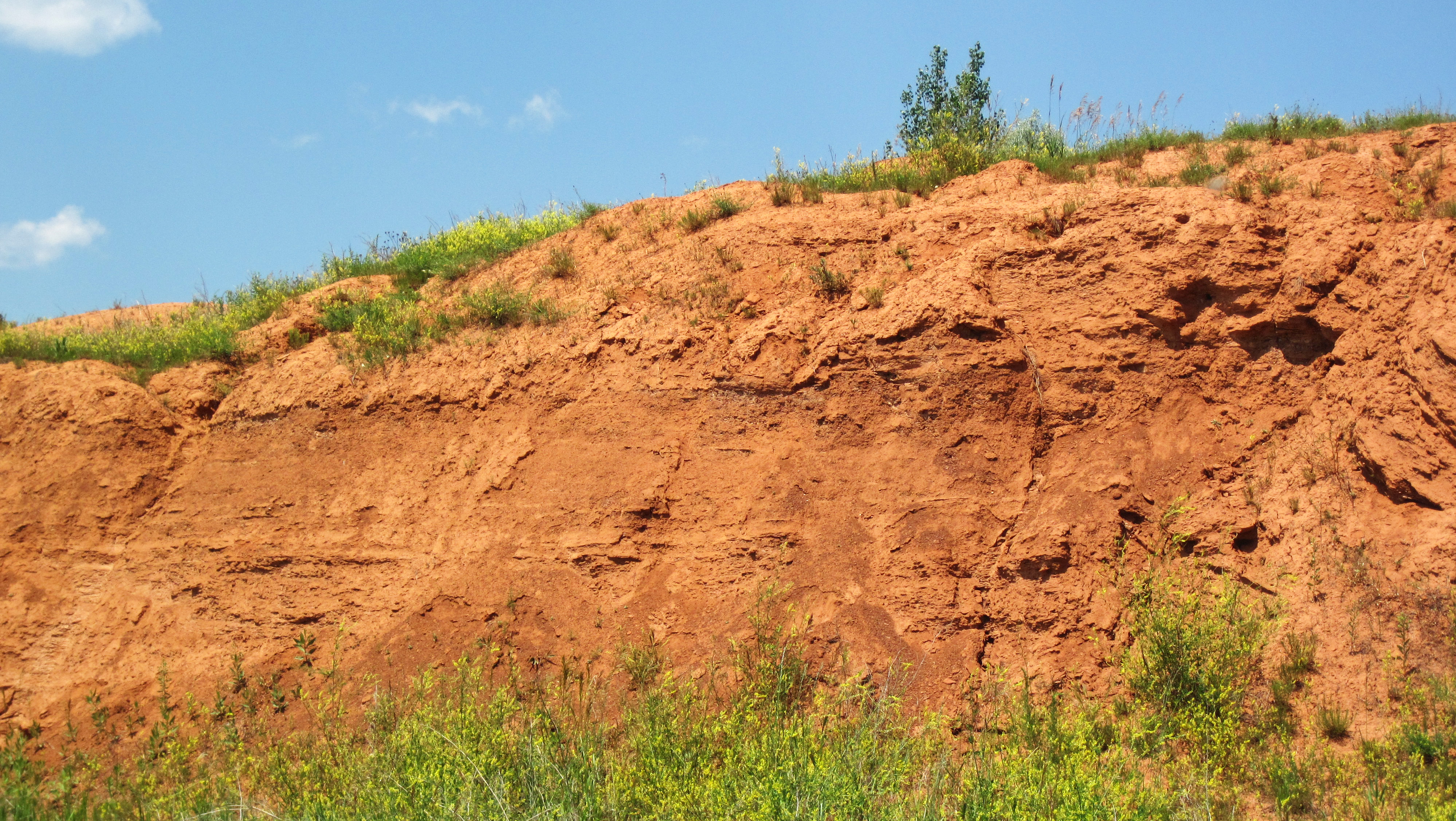
- Type: Geological formation
- Underlies: Sundance Formation, Gypsum Spring Formation, Piper Formation
- Overlies: Minnekahta Limestone
- Thickness: 350–800 feet (110–240 m)

Lithology
- Primary: Siltstone, sandstone
- Other: Shale

Location
- Region: Black Hills and nearby states
- Country: United States

Type section
- Named for: Spearfish, South Dakota
- Named by: Darton, 1899

The Spearfish Formation is a geologic formation, originally described from the Black Hills region of South Dakota, United States, but also recognised in North Dakota, Wyoming, Montana and Nebraska. It is a heterogeneous red bed formation, commonly with siltstone and gypsum low in the formation and sandstone and shale higher up. Other rock types include claystone, conglomerate, dolomite, and oil shale. It is typically regarded as Permian–Triassic in age, although its original description included Jurassic rocks.

The Spearfish Formation is interpreted as representing shallow marine to coastal terrestrial deposition, like the modern Persian Gulf. Depositional environments may have included restricted marine bodies and ephemeral lakes (gypsum), hypersaline waters (limestone), hypersaline microbial mats (oil shale), and sabkhas (dolomite). The marine waters of the shallow continental sea retreated during the deposition of the formation, reflected in a change from dominantly nearshore marine to coastal terrestrial deposition over time.

The Spearfish Formation is sparsely fossiliferous. So far, only stromatolites, casts of bivalves, and trace fossils have been found.
