= Boxwork =

Cave crystals constituting box-like blades between bygone bedrocks

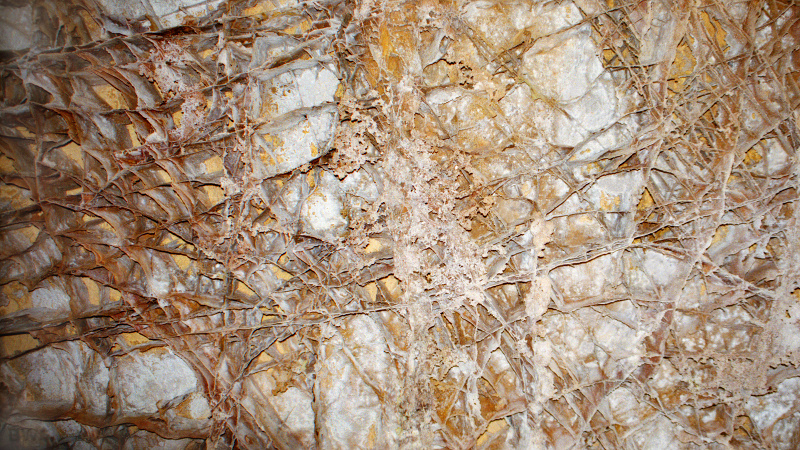
Boxwork in Wind Cave, South Dakota

In geology, boxwork is defined as a honeycomb-like structure that can form in some fractured or jointed sedimentary rocks. If the fractures in the host rock are mineralized, they can become more resistant to weathering than the surrounding rock, and subsequent erosion can produce boxwork structures. In mining geology, boxwork is a set of (typically) quartz-lined cavities, retaining the shape of the dissolved ore minerals, in gossans. In classical geology or mineralogy these mineral casts would not be called boxwork, but would instead be called pseudomorphs, or epimorphs. In cave geology, boxwork is an uncommon type of mineral structure, or speleogen (similar to a speleothem, but formed by erosion rather than accretion), occasionally found in caves and erosive environments.

== Caves ==
According to KellerLynn, "Boxwork is a speleogen, forming when bedrock between preexisting calcite veins were preferentially weathered away as the cave developed."

Boxwork is commonly composed of thin blades of the mineral calcite that project from cave walls or ceilings that intersect one another at various angles, forming a box-like or honeycomb pattern. The boxwork fins once filled cracks in the rock before the host cave formed. As the walls of the cave began to dissolve away, the more resistant vein and crack fillings did not, or at least dissolved at a slower rate than the surrounding rock, leaving the calcite fins projecting from the cave surfaces.

Some of the most extensive boxwork deposits in the world are found in Wind Cave, Wind Cave National Park in South Dakota, United States. These boxwork deposits consist of calcite, along with manganese and dolomite that precipitated in fractured host limestone. The limestone preferentially dissolved, leaving a crystalline calcite boxwork behind. Other outstanding examples occur in Cody Caves, Cody Caves Provincial Park in British Columbia, Canada. Boxwork can also be seen at Jewel Cave National Monument (near Wind Cave), and at Inner Space Cavern near Georgetown, Texas, United States.

== Gallery ==
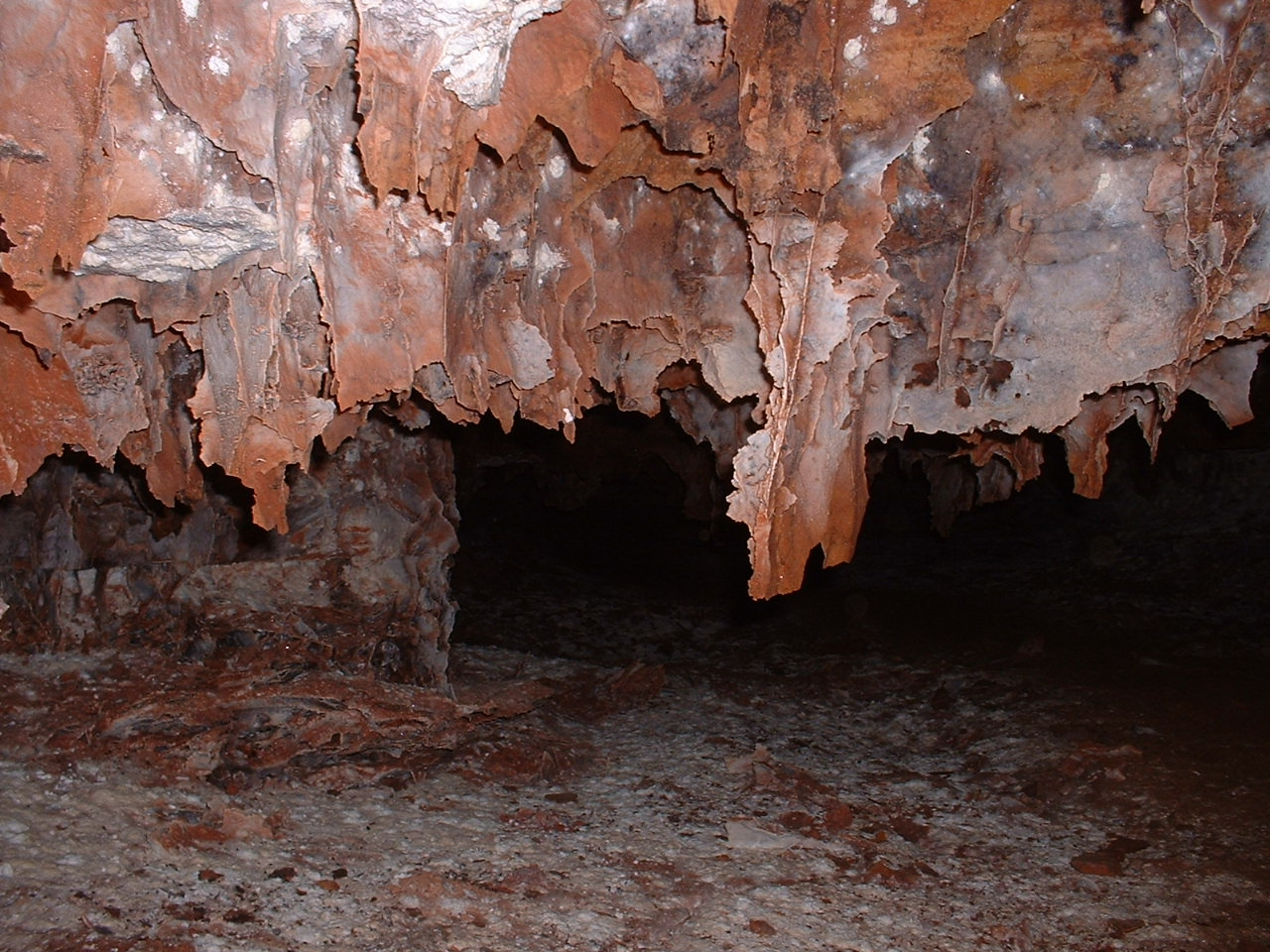
Large boxwork ("cratework") in Wind Cave

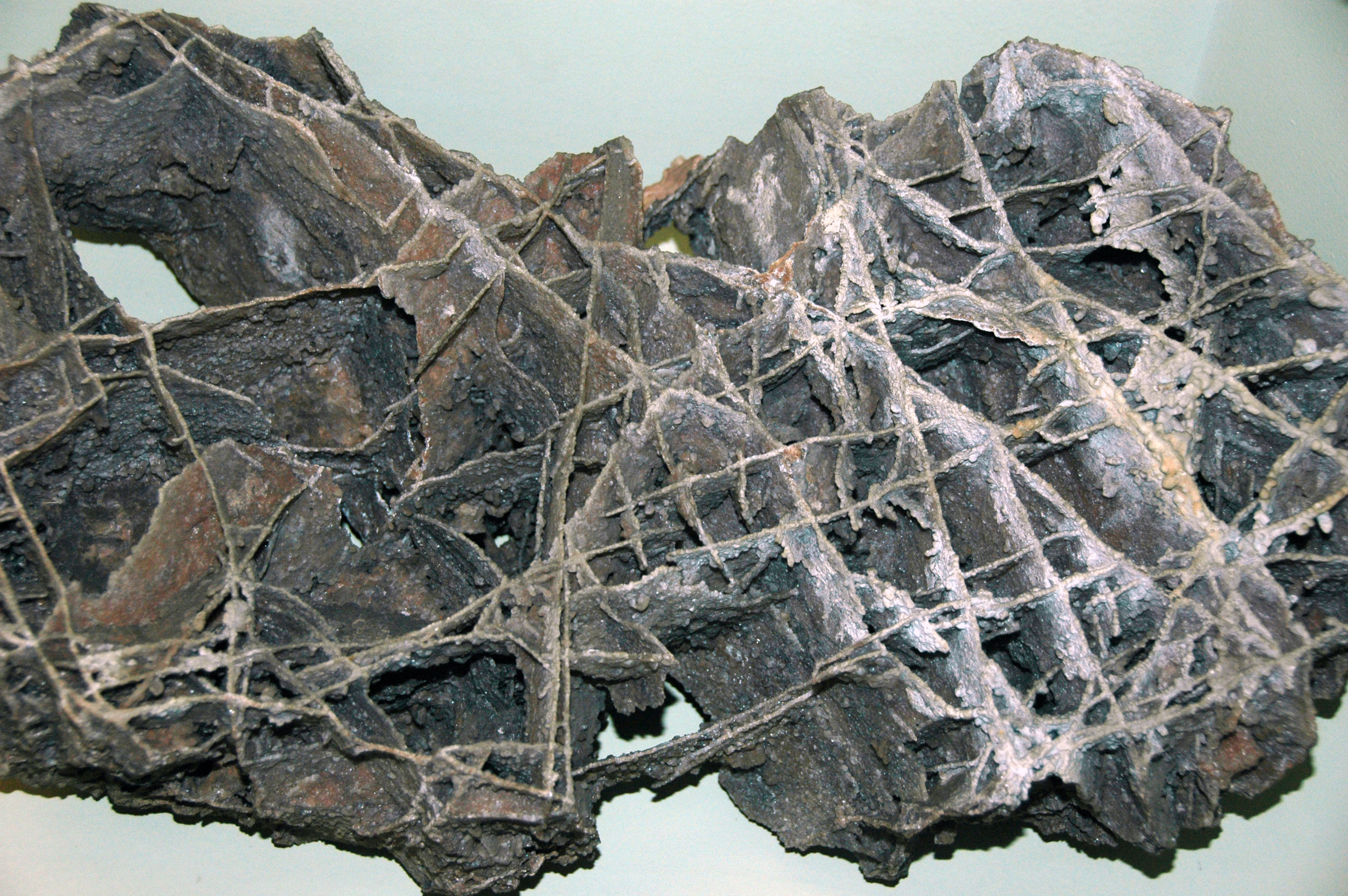
Boxwork removed from Wind Cave

Diagram of dripstone cave structures (boxworks labelled AE)
