= Minnelusa Formation =

Geological formation in South Dakota

- Stratigraphic range: Carboniferous
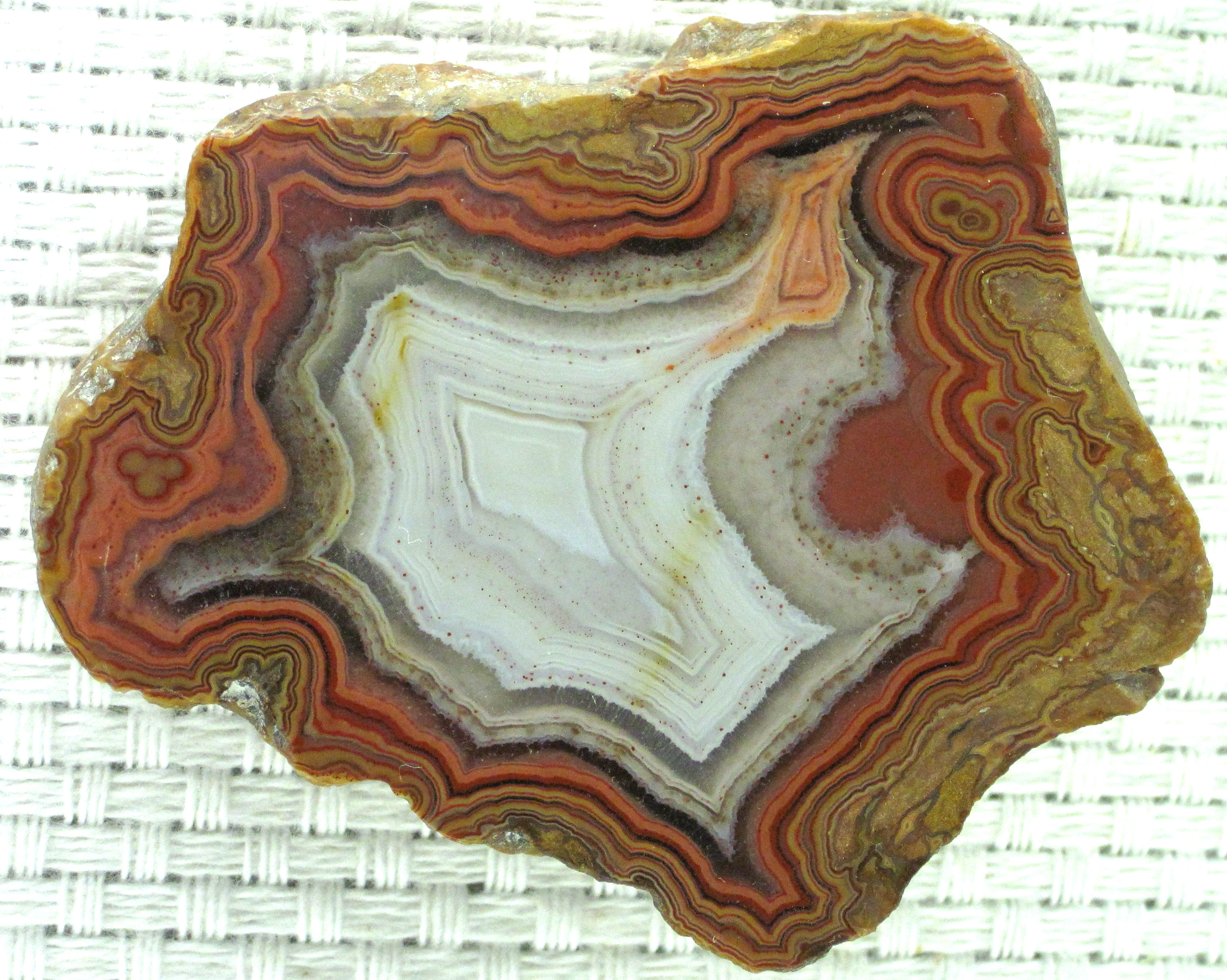
- Fairburn Agate (ultimately derived from the Minnelusa Formation; South Dakota)
- Type: Formation

Location
- Region: South Dakota, Nebraska
- Country: United States

The Minnelusa Formation is a geologic formation in South Dakota. It preserves fossils dating back to the Carboniferous period.

== See also ==
- List of fossiliferous stratigraphic units in South Dakota
- Paleontology in South Dakota
