= Miller Creek =

Miller Creek or Millers Creek may refer to:

== Streams ==
- Miller Creek (Black River), a stream in Missouri
- Miller Creek (Carpenterville, Oregon), listed on the NRHP in Oregon
- Miller Creek (Good Creek tributary), a stream in Montana
- Miller Creek (Klamath County, Oregon) impounding into Gerber Dam, Oregon
- Miller Creek (Marin County, California), a stream
- Miller Creek (Saint Louis River), a stream in Minnesota
- Miller Creek (Sixtymile River tributary), stream in Yukon, Canada
- Miller Creek (South Dakota)
- Miller Creek (San Leandro Creek) a tributary of San Leandro Creek, Alameda County, California
- Miller Creek (Tug Fork), a stream in West Virginia
- Millers Creek (Brazos River), a stream in Texas
- Millers Creek, North Carolina, an unincorporated community
- Millers Creek (Ohio), a stream in Ohio

== Schools ==
- Millers Creek Christian School
- Miller Creek Elementary School District, a school district in San Rafael, California
