= List of mountains in South Dakota =

This is a list of mountains in the U.S. state of South Dakota. This list is compiled from all of the GNIS features in South Dakota that are classified as a cliff, range, ridge, or summit, and are over 4,000 feet (1,219 m) in elevation.

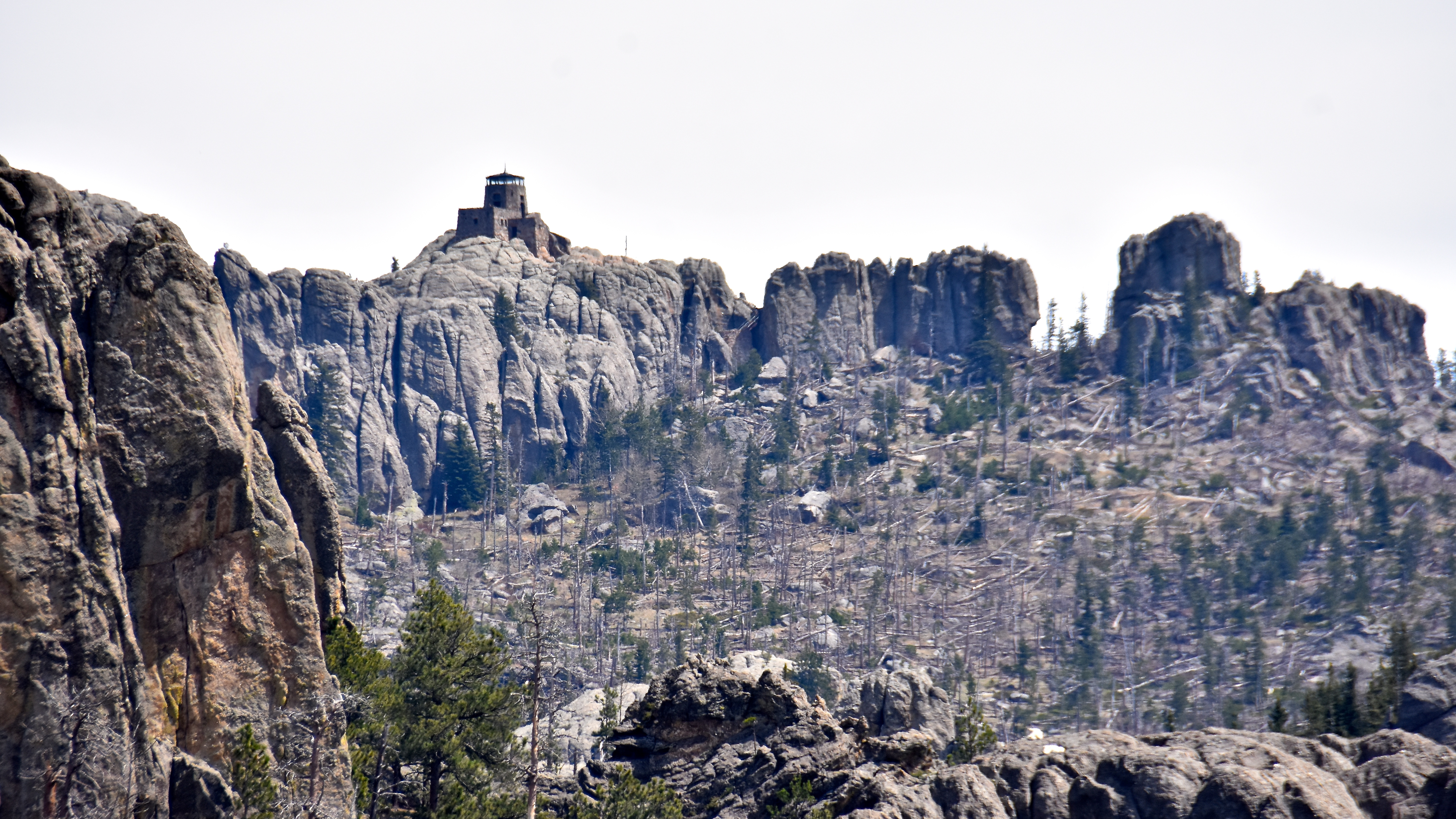
Black Elk Peak, the highest point in South Dakota

Mount Rushmore National Memorial

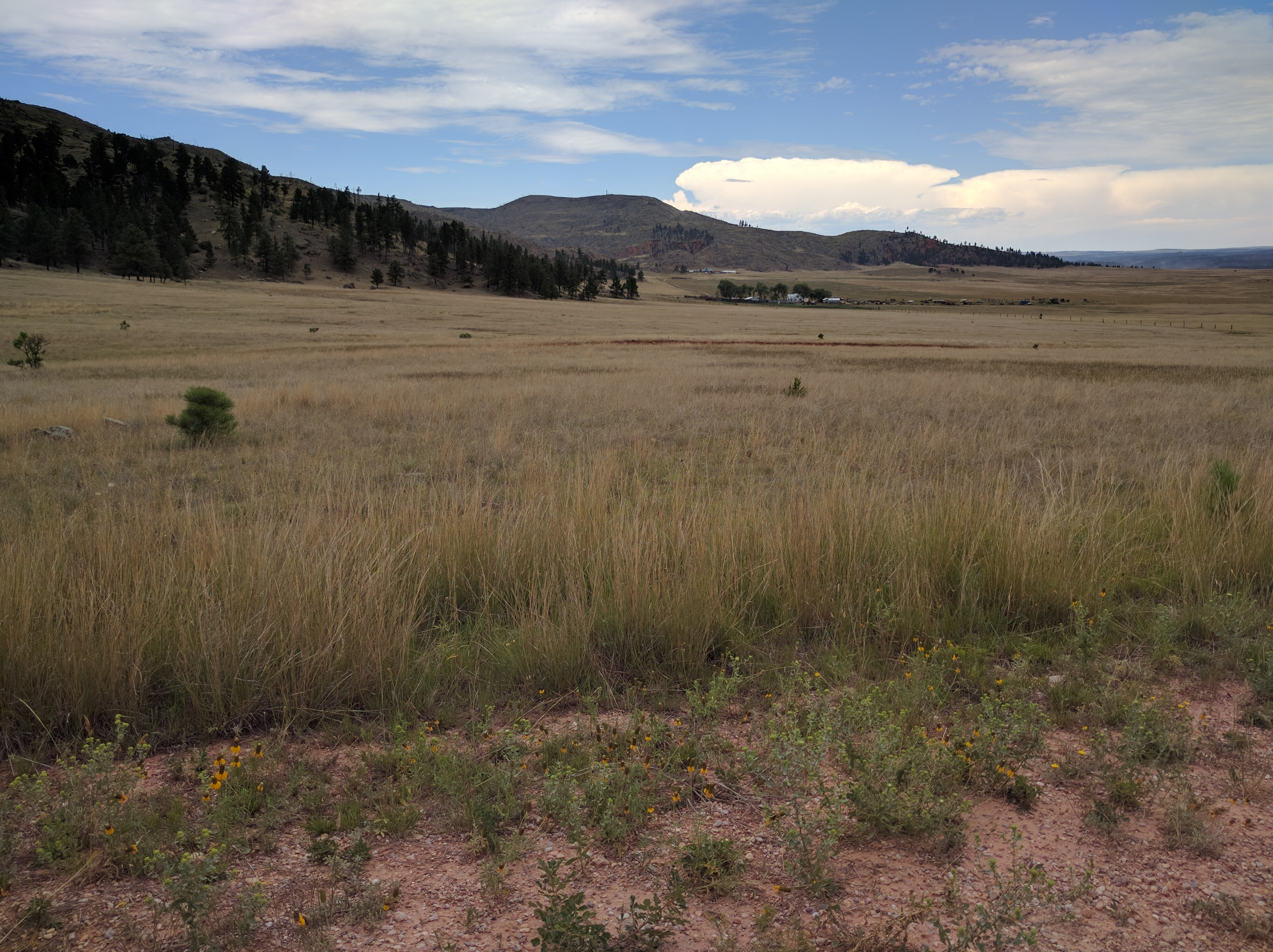
Elk Mountain with prairie in the foreground

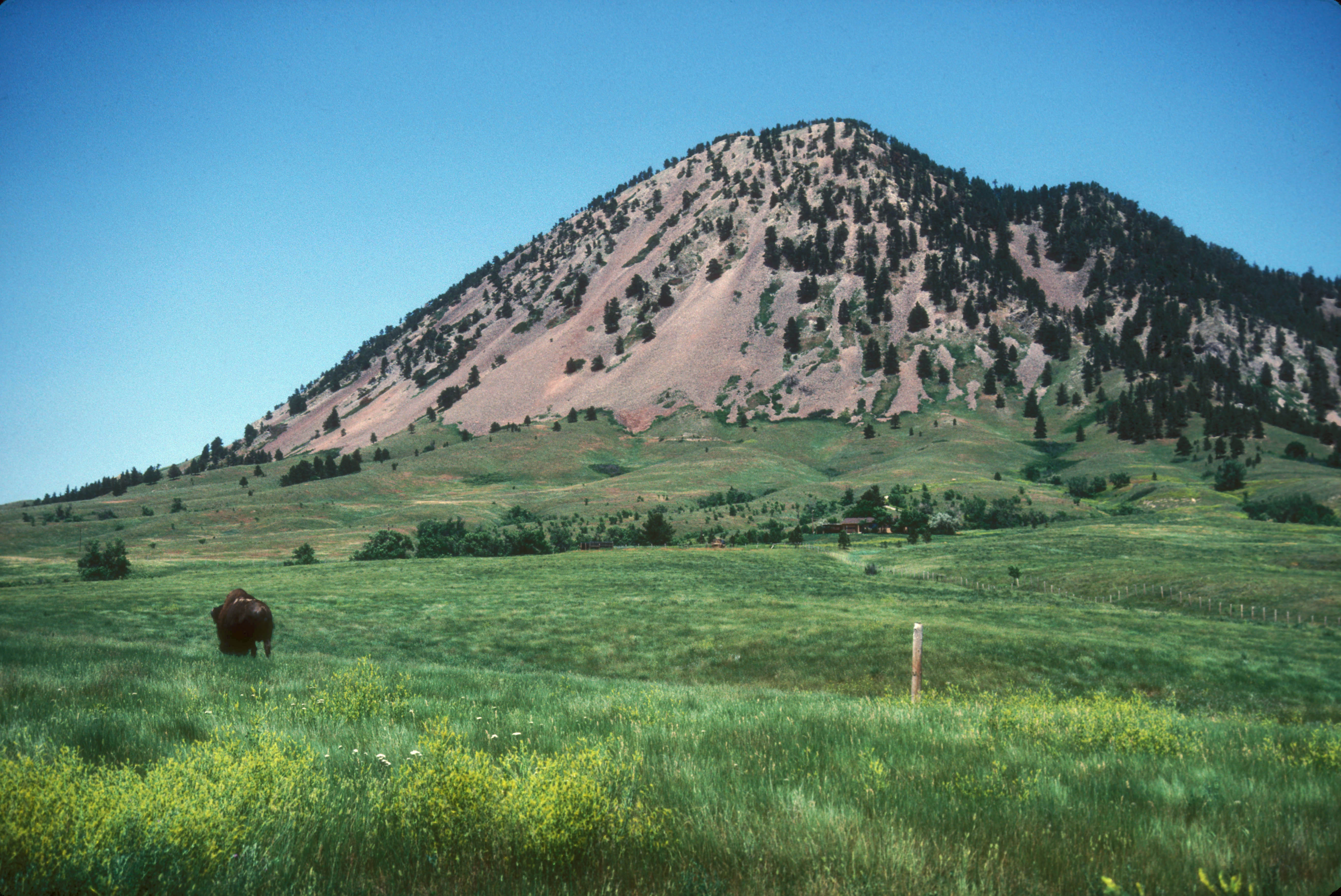
Bear Butte in Bear Butte State Park

== List of peaks above 4,000 feet ==
Name (GNIS)	County	Elevation	Coordinates
Black Elk Peak	Pennington	7,247 ft (2,209 m)	43°51′58″N 103°31′52″W
Odakota Mountain	Pennington	7,205 ft (2,196 m)	43°55′24″N 103°45′15″W
Green Mountain	Pennington	7,172 ft (2,186 m)	43°57′00″N 103°46′09″W
Bear Mountain	Pennington	7,169 ft (2,185 m)	43°52′11″N 103°44′38″W
Crooks Tower	Lawrence	7,126 ft (2,172 m)	44°09′29″N 103°55′01″W
Terry Peak	Lawrence	7,050 ft (2,150 m)	44°19′39″N 103°50′08″W
Crows Nest Peak	Pennington	7,044 ft (2,147 m)	44°03′19″N 103°57′46″W
White Tail Peak	Pennington	6,969 ft (2,124 m)	44°07′07″N 103°50′07″W
Copper Mountain	Pennington	6,926 ft (2,111 m)	43°56′15″N 103°44′29″W
Flag Mountain	Pennington	6,920 ft (2,110 m)	44°04′15″N 103°49′36″W
Laird Peak	Lawrence	6,909 ft (2,106 m)	44°12′34″N 104°00′30″W
Medicine Mountain	Pennington	6,860 ft (2,091 m)	43°54′41″N 103°42′48″W
Custer Peak	Lawrence	6,808 ft (2,075 m)	44°14′39″N 103°44′06″W
Nipple Butte	Pennington	6,808 ft (2,075 m)	44°03′25″N 103°49′53″W
Hat Mountain	Pennington	6,768 ft (2,063 m)	43°59′13″N 103°48′53″W
Elliot Ridge	Custer	6,703 ft (2,043 m)	43°50′21″N 103°48′18″W
Deer Mountain	Lawrence	6,650 ft (2,027 m)	44°18′06″N 103°49′32″W
Limestone Hill	Custer	6,631 ft (2,021 m)	43°49′09″N 103°45′37″W
Round Mountain	Custer	6,614 ft (2,016 m)	43°48′21″N 103°44′45″W
Bald Mountain	Lawrence	6,611 ft (2,015 m)	44°20′30″N 103°49′17″W
Foley Mountain	Lawrence	6,601 ft (2,012 m)	44°20′05″N 103°51′29″W
Zimmer Ridge	Pennington	6,581 ft (2,006 m)	43°53′52″N 103°37′26″W
Green Mountain	Lawrence	6,572 ft (2,003 m)	44°20′35″N 103°50′06″W
Thunderhead Mountain	Custer	6,552 ft (1,997 m)	43°50′13″N 103°37′27″W
Signal Hill	Custer	6,486 ft (1,977 m)	43°49′14″N 103°50′34″W
Saint Elmo Peak	Pennington	6,453 ft (1,967 m)	43°52′21″N 103°35′42″W
Elk Mountain	Lawrence	6,417 ft (1,956 m)	44°20′59″N 103°53′05″W
Elkhorn Mountain	Pennington	6,388 ft (1,947 m)	43°53′11″N 103°30′59″W
Atlantic Hill	Custer	6,375 ft (1,943 m)	43°48′47″N 103°40′28″W
Coad Hill	Pennington	6,371 ft (1,942 m)	43°55′18″N 103°39′46″W
Thomson-Kinney Divide	Pennington	6,368 ft (1,941 m)	43°56′03″N 104°01′06″W
Cooper Ridge	Custer	6,355 ft (1,937 m)	43°50′53″N 103°53′33″W
Castle Peak	Pennington	6,335 ft (1,931 m)	44°05′16″N 103°43′22″W
War Eagle Hill	Lawrence	6,330 ft (1,930 m)	44°21′22″N 103°51′03″W
Buckhorn Mountain	Custer	6,309 ft (1,923 m)	43°47′28″N 103°36′22″W
Sherwood-Kinney Divide	Pennington	6,286 ft (1,916 m)	43°54′28″N 104°02′12″W
Minnesota Ridge	Lawrence	6,247 ft (1,904 m)	44°10′36″N 103°42′04″W
Signal Knob	Pennington	6,214 ft (1,894 m)	44°01′14″N 103°43′44″W
Five Points	Pennington	6,211 ft (1,893 m)	43°58′18″N 103°33′03″W
Ragged Top Mountain	Lawrence	6,211 ft (1,893 m)	44°21′37″N 103°53′40″W
Rimmer Ridge	Pennington	6,207 ft (1,892 m)	44°03′48″N 103°44′08″W
Antelope Ridge	Custer	6,204 ft (1,891 m)	43°48′49″N 103°52′24″W
Dumbuk Ridge	Pennington	6,204 ft (1,891 m)	43°53′15″N 103°57′47″W
Summit Ridge	Pennington	6,204 ft (1,891 m)	43°53′29″N 104°02′15″W
Mile-high Hill	Custer	6,171 ft (1,881 m)	43°48′02″N 103°44′15″W
Cicero Peak	Custer	6,165 ft (1,879 m)	43°40′46″N 103°33′41″W
Old Bald Peak	Pennington	6,129 ft (1,868 m)	44°01′32″N 103°34′58″W
Union Hill	Pennington	6,129 ft (1,868 m)	43°58′34″N 103°35′36″W
Old Baldy Mountain	Lawrence	6,076 ft (1,852 m)	44°21′43″N 104°00′51″W
Custer Mountain	Custer	6,063 ft (1,848 m)	43°45′08″N 103°32′11″W
Redfern Mountain	Pennington	6,056 ft (1,846 m)	44°00′07″N 103°39′14″W
Richmond Hill	Lawrence	6,053 ft (1,845 m)	44°23′06″N 103°51′20″W
Lowden Mountain	Pennington	6,050 ft (1,844 m)	43°58′34″N 103°36′58″W
Mount Coolidge	Custer	6,010 ft (1,832 m)	43°44′41″N 103°28′54″W
Sugarloaf Mountain	Lawrence	6,010 ft (1,832 m)	44°19′31″N 103°47′35″W
Twin Peaks	Lawrence	6,010 ft (1,832 m)	44°22′13″N 103°52′44″W
Negro Hill	Lawrence	5,970 ft (1,820 m)	44°22′48″N 104°03′05″W
Sunshine Hill	Lawrence	5,932 ft (1,808 m)	44°23′01″N 104°02′59″W
Grandview Hill	Lawrence	5,928 ft (1,807 m)	44°23′16″N 104°03′11″W
Scruton Mountain	Pennington	5,925 ft (1,806 m)	44°02′34″N 103°31′35″W
Twin Sisters	Custer	5,922 ft (1,805 m)	43°42′50″N 103°42′22″W
Flag Mountain	Pennington	5,896 ft (1,797 m)	43°55′56″N 103°36′28″W
Little Crow Peak	Lawrence	5,889 ft (1,795 m)	44°24′16″N 103°52′59″W
The Needles	Lawrence	5,889 ft (1,795 m)	44°24′47″N 104°00′59″W
Beartown Hill	Lawrence	5,886 ft (1,794 m)	44°23′05″N 104°01′35″W
Smith Mountain	Pennington	5,886 ft (1,794 m)	43°57′20″N 103°36′59″W
Strawberry Ridge	Lawrence	5,886 ft (1,794 m)	44°19′12″N 103°42′02″W
Samelias Peak	Pennington	5,846 ft (1,782 m)	43°55′53″N 103°28′46″W
Tunnel Ridge	Pennington	5,846 ft (1,782 m)	44°07′13″N 103°36′51″W
Silver Peak	Pennington	5,810 ft (1,771 m)	44°04′27″N 103°35′09″W
Campaign Hill	Pennington	5,810 ft (1,770 m)	43°55′38″N 103°36′22″W
Spearfish Peak	Lawrence	5,804 ft (1,769 m)	44°25′53″N 103°51′20″W
Crow Peak	Lawrence	5,771 ft (1,759 m)	44°28′13″N 103°57′47″W
Bowman Ridge	Custer	5,732 ft (1,747 m)	43°38′49″N 103°33′49″W
Humbolt Mountain	Pennington	5,732 ft (1,747 m)	43°56′50″N 103°32′58″W
Mount Rushmore	Pennington	5,719 ft (1,743 m)	43°52′48″N 103°27′33″W
Bishop Mountain	Pennington	5,692 ft (1,735 m)	43°55′19″N 103°33′51″W
Mount Theodore Roosevelt	Lawrence	5,689 ft (1,734 m)	44°23′54″N 103°45′33″W
Crystal Mountain	Lawrence	5,686 ft (1,733 m)	44°12′10″N 103°35′07″W
Elk Mountain	Custer	5,663 ft (1,726 m)	43°43′27″N 104°02′29″W
Storm Hill	Pennington	5,659 ft (1,725 m)	43°56′07″N 103°32′16″W
Whitetail Summit	Lawrence	5,659 ft (1,725 m)	44°20′28″N 103°46′21″W
Bear Den Mountain	Lawrence	5,646 ft (1,721 m)	44°20′47″N 103°38′27″W
Surveyors Hill	Custer	5,646 ft (1,721 m)	43°45′56″N 103°55′20″W
Ford Mountain	Pennington	5,640 ft (1,720 m)	43°55′30″N 103°33′21″W
Calamity Peak	Custer	5,627 ft (1,715 m)	43°46′42″N 103°32′50″W
Summit Peak	Pennington	5,623 ft (1,714 m)	43°54′33″N 103°32′39″W
Woodpecker Ridge	Custer	5,617 ft (1,712 m)	43°49′54″N 103°25′10″W
Calumet Ridge	Pennington	5,607 ft (1,709 m)	43°57′32″N 103°27′01″W
Old Baldy Mountain	Pennington	5,600 ft (1,707 m)	43°53′27″N 103°27′30″W
Hardesty Peak	Pennington	5,581 ft (1,701 m)	43°55′35″N 103°28′25″W
Tetro Rock	Lawrence	5,568 ft (1,697 m)	44°24′37″N 103°48′31″W
Custer Hill	Lawrence	5,548 ft (1,691 m)	44°19′22″N 103°38′06″W
Buck Mountain	Pennington	5,540 ft (1,690 m)	44°07′45″N 103°30′42″W
Merritt Peak	Pennington	5,528 ft (1,685 m)	44°07′29″N 103°33′41″W
Red Butte	Custer	5,509 ft (1,679 m)	43°46′04″N 103°58′00″W
Wildcat Peak	Custer	5,509 ft (1,679 m)	43°40′13″N 104°02′28″W
Dome Mountain	Lawrence	5,492 ft (1,674 m)	44°21′20″N 103°39′46″W
Yellow Butte	Custer	5,463 ft (1,665 m)	43°46′35″N 103°58′17″W
Iron Mountain	Pennington	5,450 ft (1,660 m)	43°51′31″N 103°26′00″W
Lexington Hill	Lawrence	5,450 ft (1,660 m)	44°22′06″N 103°41′43″W
Pillar Peak	Lawrence	5,450 ft (1,660 m)	44°22′09″N 103°38′50″W
Pilot Knob	Lawrence	5,436 ft (1,657 m)	44°08′44″N 103°34′19″W
Doane Mountain	Pennington	5,427 ft (1,654 m)	43°52′33″N 103°27′28″W
Flagstaff Mountain	Meade	5,420 ft (1,652 m)	44°16′01″N 103°32′21″W
Polo Peak	Lawrence	5,410 ft (1,650 m)	44°24′53″N 103°45′28″W
Silver Mountain	Pennington	5,410 ft (1,649 m)	43°56′45″N 103°24′20″W
Green Top	Lawrence	5,380 ft (1,640 m)	44°13′25″N 103°31′46″W
Kirk Hill	Lawrence	5,350 ft (1,630 m)	44°19′18″N 103°35′08″W
White Mansion	Lawrence	5,350 ft (1,630 m)	44°13′46″N 103°31′11″W
Boulder Hill	Pennington	5,341 ft (1,628 m)	43°57′43″N 103°23′54″W
Ingersoll Peak	Pennington	5,331 ft (1,625 m)	43°54′43″N 103°27′02″W
Green Mountain	Lawrence	5,328 ft (1,624 m)	44°25′31″N 103°45′13″W
Clark Mountain	Pennington	5,256 ft (1,602 m)	43°58′14″N 103°29′29″W
White Rocks	Lawrence	5,256 ft (1,602 m)	44°22′37″N 103°43′13″W
Twin Sisters	Pennington	5,243 ft (1,598 m)	44°01′14″N 103°27′46″W
Eagle Mountain	Pennington	5,236 ft (1,596 m)	43°55′40″N 103°24′51″W
Green Mountain	Pennington	5,233 ft (1,595 m)	44°08′12″N 103°28′26″W
Perrin Mountain	Pennington	5,210 ft (1,588 m)	44°05′07″N 103°28′33″W
The Pulpit	Pennington	5,197 ft (1,584 m)	43°53′30″N 103°32′26″W
Bluelead Mountain	Pennington	5,180 ft (1,579 m)	43°58′00″N 103°27′10″W
Storm Hill	Pennington	5,174 ft (1,577 m)	43°57′59″N 103°23′27″W
Whitewood Peak	Lawrence	5,112 ft (1,558 m)	44°24′33″N 103°40′35″W
Thrall Mountain	Pennington	5,090 ft (1,550 m)	44°04′12″N 103°26′15″W
Rankin Ridge	Custer	5,010 ft (1,527 m)	43°37′32″N 103°28′57″W
Norris Peak	Pennington	4,984 ft (1,519 m)	44°05′49″N 103°25′35″W
Sullivan Peak	Custer	4,967 ft (1,514 m)	43°35′32″N 104°00′10″W
Twin Buttes	Custer	4,948 ft (1,508 m)	43°36′24″N 104°01′10″W
Deadman Mountain	Meade	4,944 ft (1,507 m)	44°22′07″N 103°32′11″W
Hat Mountain	Pennington	4,882 ft (1,488 m)	44°06′31″N 103°26′05″W
Crook Mountain	Lawrence	4,852 ft (1,479 m)	44°25′01″N 103°38′08″W
Parker Peak	Fall River	4,843 ft (1,476 m)	43°23′55″N 103°41′28″W
Tepee Peak	Pennington	4,810 ft (1,466 m)	43°55′39″N 103°23′54″W
Pilger Mountain	Custer	4,797 ft (1,462 m)	43°30′01″N 103°54′07″W
Matias Peak	Fall River	4,780 ft (1,457 m)	43°24′39″N 103°44′16″W
Stagebarn Ridge	Meade	4,770 ft (1,454 m)	44°12′24″N 103°25′55″W
Echo Peak	Pennington	4,760 ft (1,451 m)	43°55′33″N 103°23′14″W
Elk Knob	Custer	4,747 ft (1,447 m)	43°33′51″N 103°30′59″W
Red Hill	Lawrence	4,690 ft (1,430 m)	44°22′04″N 103°34′46″W
Red Point	Custer	4,685 ft (1,428 m)	43°36′08″N 104°00′06″W
Horse Trap Mountain	Fall River	4,682 ft (1,427 m)	43°22′55″N 103°38′46″W
Buzzards Roost	Pennington	4,678 ft (1,426 m)	44°03′08″N 103°23′17″W
Mount Wheaton	Pennington	4,603 ft (1,403 m)	44°03′30″N 103°24′34″W
Theater Ridge	Custer	4,583 ft (1,397 m)	43°31′56″N 103°32′14″W
Elkhorn Peak	Lawrence	4,530 ft (1,380 m)	44°28′30″N 103°42′09″W
Gold Hill	Pennington	4,521 ft (1,378 m)	43°57′26″N 103°20′52″W
Elk Mountain	Custer	4,505 ft (1,373 m)	43°33′37″N 103°29′28″W
Flint Hill	Fall River	4,485 ft (1,367 m)	43°20′31″N 103°40′42″W
Chilson Mountain	Fall River	4,475 ft (1,364 m)	43°20′03″N 103°41′58″W
Roundtop Hill	Fall River	4,460 ft (1,360 m)	43°22′25″N 103°36′13″W
Lookout Peak	Lawrence	4,452 ft (1,357 m)	44°29′34″N 103°50′09″W
Granite Peak	Lawrence	4,430 ft (1,350 m)	44°23′30″N 103°34′11″W
Fossil Ridge	Custer	4,423 ft (1,348 m)	43°32′25″N 103°31′13″W
Bear Butte	Meade	4,413 ft (1,345 m)	44°28′33″N 103°25′37″W
Battle Mountain	Fall River	4,403 ft (1,342 m)	43°26′33″N 103°27′13″W
Bald Mountain	Meade	4,347 ft (1,325 m)	44°17′19″N 103°27′32″W
Flagpole Mountain	Fall River	4,321 ft (1,317 m)	43°18′19″N 103°31′25″W
Racetrack Butte	Custer	4,304 ft (1,312 m)	43°40′30″N 103°22′29″W
Unkpapa Peak	Custer	4,281 ft (1,305 m)	43°30′48″N 103°22′28″W
Gobbler Ridge	Custer	4,259 ft (1,298 m)	43°31′26″N 103°28′42″W
Negro Wool Ridge	Custer	4,222 ft (1,287 m)	43°33′35″N 103°26′08″W
Boland Ridge	Custer	4,183 ft (1,275 m)	43°36′13″N 103°22′14″W
Lakota Peak	Pennington	4,163 ft (1,269 m)	43°51′56″N 103°15′36″W
Butcher Hill	Custer	4,108 ft (1,252 m)	43°42′59″N 103°18′40″W
Dow Ridge	Custer	4,104 ft (1,251 m)	43°38′28″N 103°19′38″W
Turkey Hill	Pennington	4,085 ft (1,245 m)	44°04′32″N 103°19′34″W
Oyster Mountain	Meade	4,049 ft (1,234 m)	44°26′08″N 103°33′48″W
Red Hill	Custer	4,029 ft (1,228 m)	43°41′44″N 103°20′17″W
Harding Peak	Harding	4,012 ft (1,223 m)	45°22′13″N 103°53′12″W
East Short Pine Hill	Harding	4,007 ft (1,221 m)	45°22′23″N 103°41′52″W

== See also ==
- Geography of South Dakota
