= Jasper Fire =

The Jasper Fire may refer to:

- The 2000 Jasper Fire in South Dakota, United States
- The 2024 Jasper wildfire in Alberta, Canada
