= List of South Dakota wildfires =

This is a partial list of notable wildfires in the U.S. state of South Dakota. Most fires occur in the Black Hills, a heavily-forested national park on South Dakota's border with Wyoming.

== Background ==
While "fire season" varies every year in South Dakota, most wildfires occur between February and April and June and August. However, there is an increasing fire danger year-round. Fire conditions can be exacerbated by drought, strong winds, and vegetation growth. Climate change is leading to increased temperatures, lower humidity levels, and drought conditions are happening more often. Additionally, warmer temperatures and less precipitation can result in less snowmelt, further contributing to bad wildfire conditions.

== List of fires ==
This list includes only fires that burned more than 5,000 acres (2,000 ha), resulted in loss of life, or are otherwise notable. Sizes for Black Hills fires between 1910 and 2022 are from the United States Forest Service.

Year	Name	Area	Size	Deaths	Notes
1931	Rochford	Rochford, Black Hills	20,934 acres (8,472 ha)		
1939	McVey	near Hill City, Black Hills	20,796 acres (8,416 ha)	0	
1947		Hand, Hughes, Hyde, and Potter Counties	250,000 acres (100,000 ha) combined		Three separate prairie fires on the same day
1959	Deadwood	Deadwood, Black Hills	4,547 acres (1,840 ha)		
1960	Wildcat Canyon	between Hot Springs and Edgemont, Black Hills	10,454 acres (4,231 ha)		
1985	Flint Hill	between Hot Springs and Edgemont, Black Hills	21,746 acres (8,800 ha)		
1988	Galena	Custer State Park, Black Hills	17,976 acres (7,275 ha)	0	Keystone and Mount Rushmore evacuated, 9 firefighters injured
1988	Westberry Trails	west of Rapid City, Black Hills	4,778 acres (1,934 ha)	0	Multiple homes burned, considered arson
1990	Cicero Peak	southeast of Custer, Black Hills	14,518 acres (5,875 ha)	0	
2000	Jasper	Jewel Cave National Monument, Black Hills	83,508 acres (33,794 ha)	0	Largest single wildfire in South Dakota and Black Hills history, ruled an arson
2001	Elk Mountain II	north of Dewey, Black Hills (Note: This fire burned partially in Wyoming.)	13,195 acres (5,340 ha)		
2001	Rogers Shack	south of Jewel Cave, Black Hills	11,896 acres (4,814 ha)		
2001	West Hell	between Hot Springs and Edgemont, Black Hills	10,547 acres (4,268 ha)	0	
2002	Grizzly Gulch	southeast of Deadwood, Black Hills	11,589 acres (4,690 ha)	0	Deadwood evacuated
2002	Battle Creek	Rockerville, Black Hills	13,495 acres (5,461 ha)	0	Several homes burned, Rockerville evacuated, US 16 closed between Rapid City and Mount Rushmore
2003	Red Point	north of Dewey, Black Hills	17,639 acres (7,138 ha)	0	
2007	Alabaugh	southwest of Hot Springs, Black Hills	10,324 acres (4,178 ha)	1	
2011	Coal Canyon	north of Edgemont, Black Hills	5,177 acres (2,095 ha)	1	
2012	White Draw	north of Edgemont, Black Hills	8,640 acres (3,500 ha)	4 (Note: Although no deaths occurred directly, 4 firefighters died in an airplane crash while fighting the fire.)	
2017	Legion Lake	Custer State Park and Wind Cave National Park, Black Hills	53,875 acres (21,802 ha)	0	
2021	Schroeder	west of Rapid City, Black Hills	2,165 acres (876 ha)	0	Caused mass evacuations in the area of the 1988 Westberry Trails Fire

== See also ==
- List of wildfires
- 2025 South Dakota wildfires
- 2026 South Dakota wildfires
