= 2000 Jasper Fire =

2000 wildfire in South Dakota

Jasper Fire
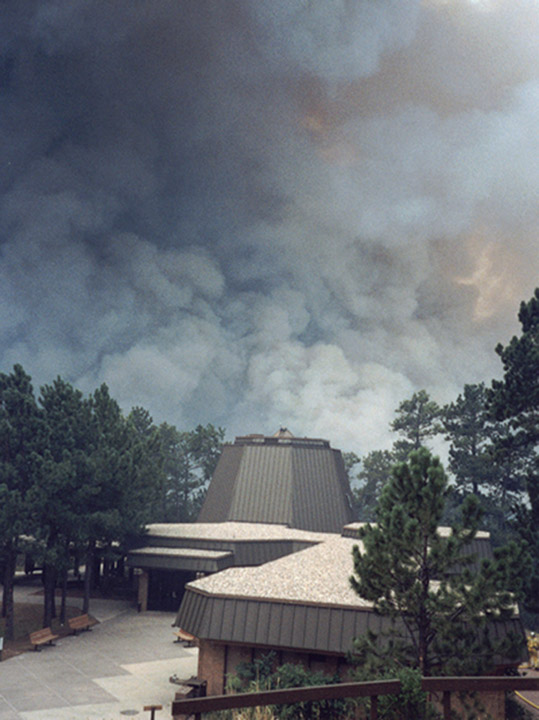
- Jasper Fire approaching Jewel Cave
- Date: August 24 – September 25, 2000
- Location: Black Hills, South Dakota, U.S.
- Coordinates: 43°47′40″N 103°52′56″W

Statistics
- Status: Extinguished
- Burned area: 83,508 acres (33,794 ha; 337.94 km^{2})

Impacts
- Cost: $42 million

Ignition
- Cause: Dropped lit match
- Perpetrator: Janice Stevenson
- Motive: Arson

Map
- General area of the fire in South Dakota

The Jasper Fire was a wildfire that occurred between August 24 and September 25, 2000, in the Black Hills of South Dakota, United States. Burning a total of 83,508 acres (33,794 ha; 337.94 km^{2}) across the southern hills, it is the largest wildfire in both state and Black Hills history. It burned over 90% of the total land area of Jewel Cave National Monument. As of 2024, efforts to replenish the natural vegetation inside the burn scar are still ongoing.

The cause of the fire was later determined to be arson. Janice Stevenson of Newcastle, Wyoming, was arrested and accused of setting the fire by way of dropping a lit match and failing to put it out. In 2001, Stevenson pled guilty to second-degree arson and was sentenced to 25 years in prison.

== Events ==
On August 24, 2000, a motorist, later identified as Janice Stevenson of Newcastle, Wyoming, stopped to use the bathroom on the side of U.S. Highway 16 near Jasper Cave Road, just west of Jewel Cave. She lit a cigarette and threw the lit match on the ground, which ignited the grass. Reportedly, Stevenson noticed the fire and drove away.

The fire was reported at 2:18 p.m. the same day. Hot and dry conditions, low humidity, and heavy ground litter allowed the fire to spread rapidly, and shifting winds spread the fire in multiple directions. At its peak, the fire burned 100 acres (40 ha) per minute. On August 26, the fire burned 48,000 acres (19,000 ha; 190 km^{2}). Over 1,100 firefighters were involved in fighting the blaze.

The fire was declared contained on September 8 at 6:00 p.m. and was officially deemed controlled on September 25.

== Impact ==
=== Aftermath ===
Overall, the fire burned 83,508 acres (33,794 ha; 337.94 km^{2}) of forest, making it the largest wildfire in both South Dakota and Black Hills history. It stretched across parts of Custer and Pennington Counties. The Jasper Fire was 25% larger than any other reported fire in the Black Hills. Of land use in the Black Hills National Forest, 52,472 acres (21,235 ha) in Hell Canyon Ranger District, 26,294 acres (10,641 ha) in Mystic Ranger District, and 2,836 acres (1,148 ha) of private land burned. 27% of the impacted area was so severely burned that all trees were destroyed and ecological succession was reset. Multiple summer houses and cabins were also destroyed. Overall, the fire incurred around $9 million in firefighting costs and caused an estimated $42 million in overall damages.

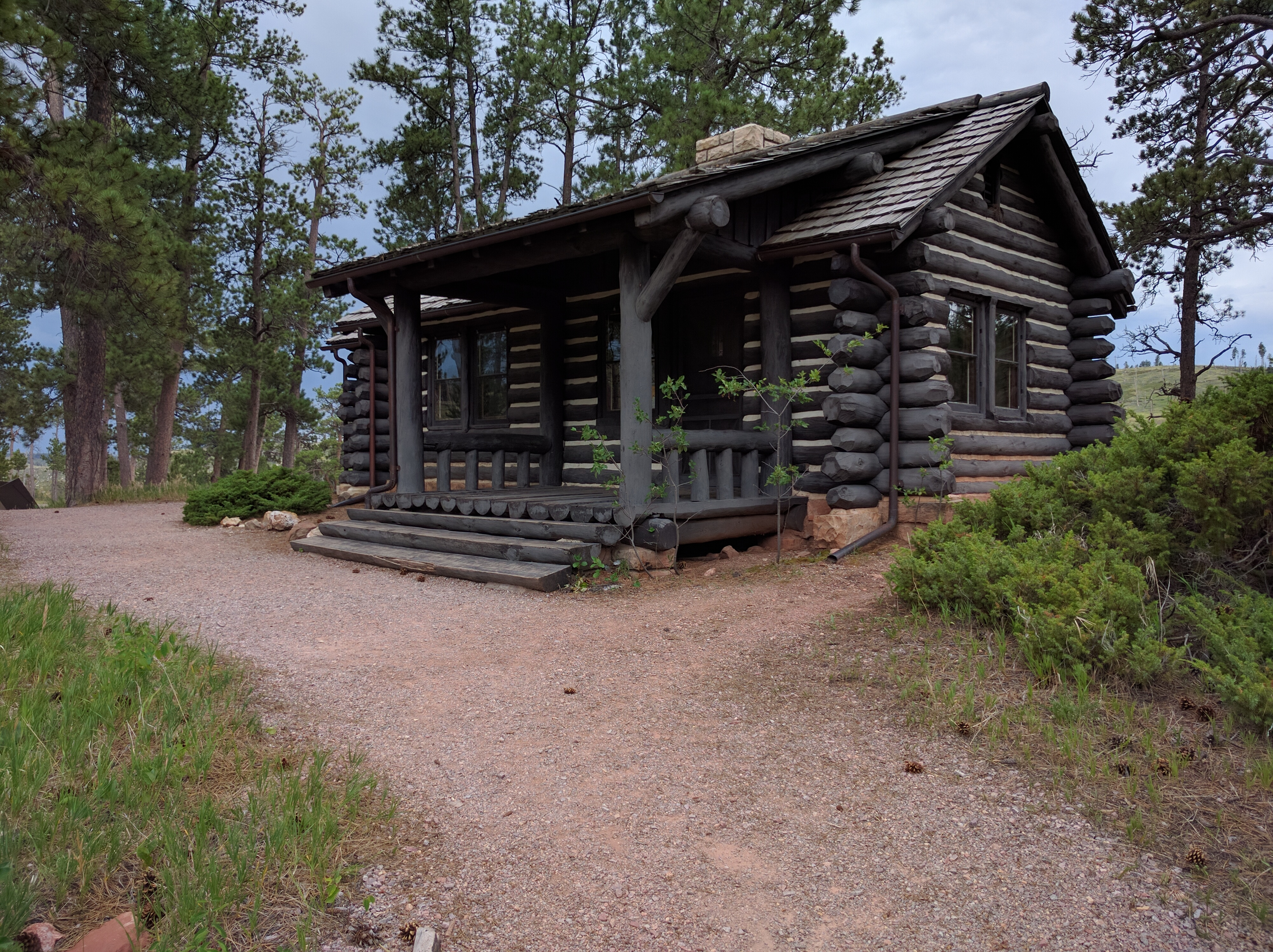
Jewel Cave Ranger Station survived the fire.

The fire burned 1,279 acres (518 ha), about 90% of the entire area, of Jewel Cave National Monument. However, firefighting measures were effective enough that no structures inside the park were lost. Controlled burns in 1994 and 1999 had cleared away enough underbrush to prevent the fire from moving towards and destroying the visitor center and surrounding buildings. The Jewel Cave Ranger Station, a historic log cabin, was foamed multiple times to keep it from burning. The park remained closed until September 2, when the forest was satisfied that the fire was safely contained.

=== Impact on wildlife ===
The fire burned much of the natural habitat for various native species, including deer, turkeys, elk, coyotes, porcupines, squirrels, and bobcats. However, it increased the natural habitat for insects and woodpeckers, which thrive in snags. One pregnant mountain lion that was being tracked by a United States Geological Survey research group was killed in the fire.

=== Replanting efforts ===
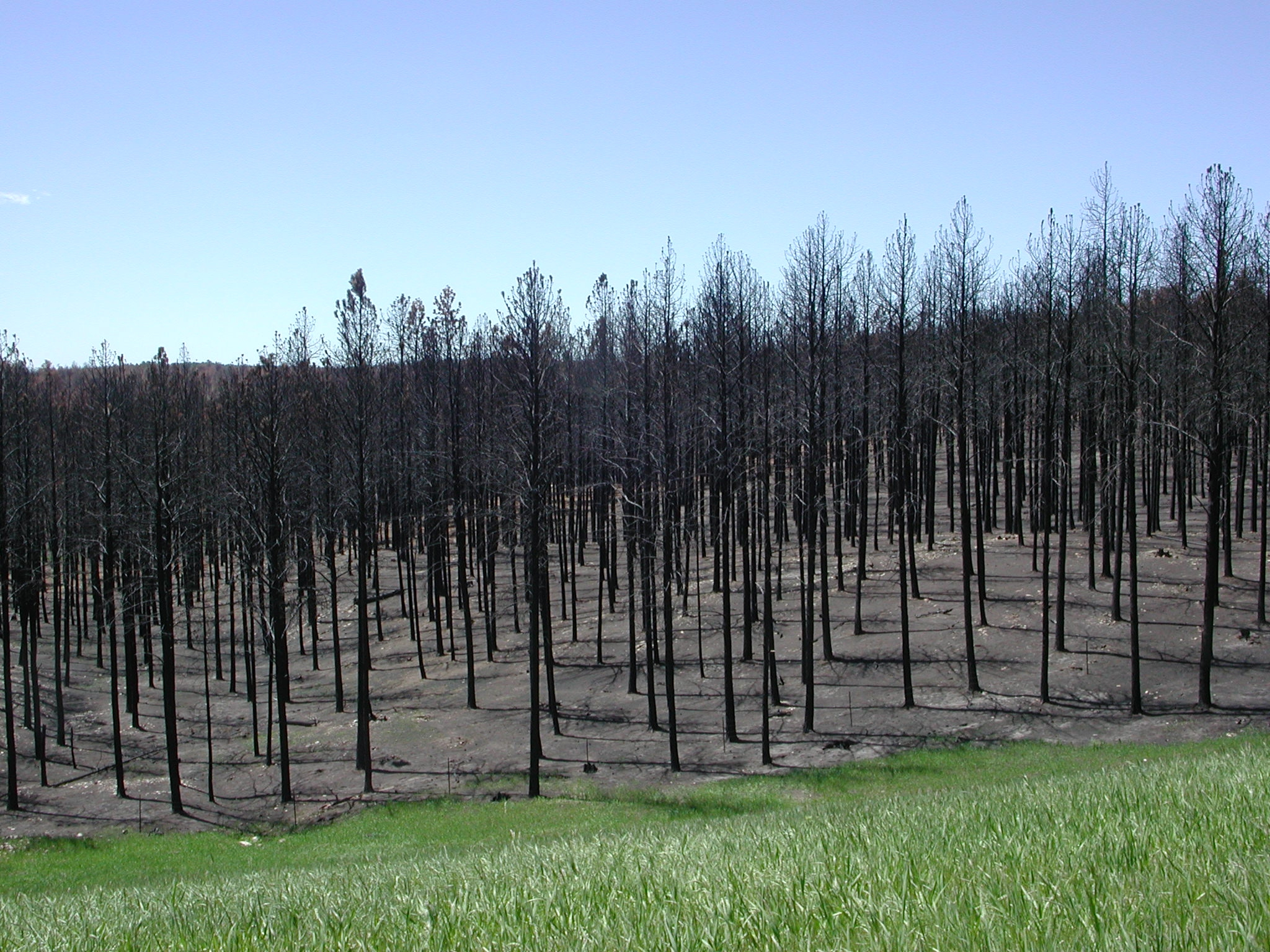
Tree damage in the aftermath of the fire

Most of the trees lost were ponderosa pines, which are notoriously difficult to regrow in severe burn areas due to their short-distance seed dispersal method. Additionally, the fire was so intense that it destroyed the seed sources in the soil, leaving no natural way for trees to regenerate inside the burn scar.

The Jasper Fire Area Tree Planting Project began in 2002 with the aim of replacing the thousands of trees lost in the fire and restoring the natural vegetation, using saplings grown in Nebraska's Bessey Nursery. Under this program, the USFS currently plants about 150,000 new saplings across 400 acres (160 ha) annually within the affected area.

A 2022 report analyzing vegetation regrowth found that 46% of the most heavily-burned area showed little to no regeneration.

== Investigation ==
The cause of the fire was quickly determined to be arson. Two separate witnesses identified Stevenson's car at the fire's point of origin. Stevenson was arrested at a relative's house in Custer. According to her family and her lawyer, Stevenson had a history of mental illness and setting fires.

During the investigation, Stevenson admitted she could have put out the fire before it spread; she later stated she meant to start the fire but did not think it would grow so large. She was also questioned about potential involvement in the 1988 Westberry Trails Fire, an unsolved arson which destroyed 15 homes in Rapid City, South Dakota. A polygraph expert said Stevenson admitted to setting three other fires prior to Jasper.

In May 2001, Stevenson entered a guilty plea agreement, requiring her to plead guilty to arson as well as to cooperate with the Westberry investigation. However, after Stevenson failed a polygraph test regarding the Westberry Trails Fire, Assistant Attorney General Paul Bachand sought a harsher sentence—asking 25 years instead of just 17 1/2—and argued that Stevenson had violated the terms of the plea. Stevenson's attorney opposed the reversal, stating it was motivated by the opportunity to close the Westberry Trails case.

In July, Stevenson was sentenced to 10 years in prison for destruction of U.S. federal property. The following month, she was sentenced to an additional 25 years for second-degree arson, to be served concurrently with the previous 10-year sentence. Stevenson appealed her sentence, but it was upheld by the South Dakota Supreme Court in 2002.

== See also ==
- List of South Dakota wildfires
- White Draw Fire
