= McVey Fire =

1939 wildfire in South Dakota

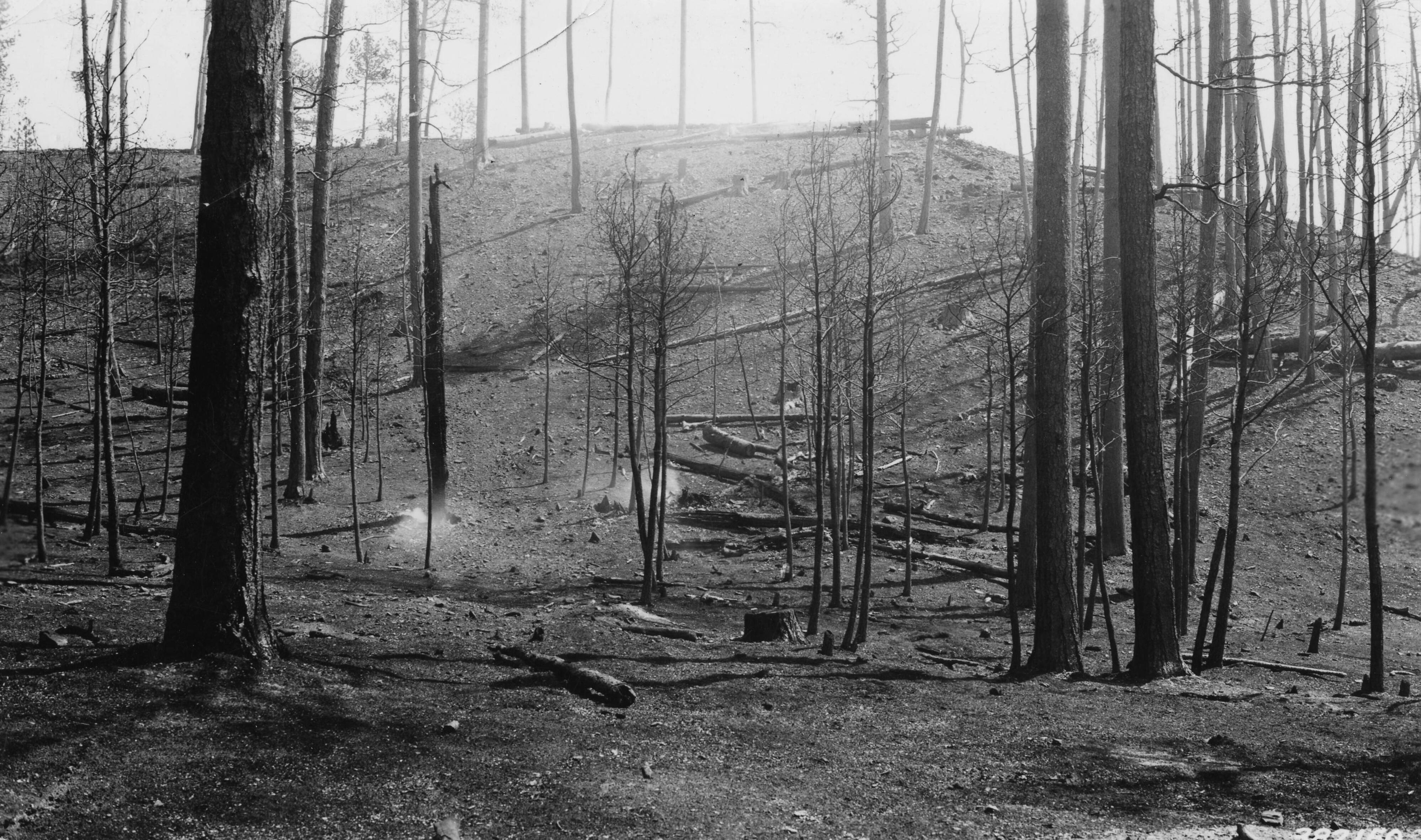
- Trees burned by the fire
- Date: July 10–12, 1939
- Location: Black Hills, South Dakota, US
- Coordinates: 44°01′03″N 103°37′12″W

Statistics
- Burned area: 20,729 acres (8,389 ha)
- Land use: Forest

Impacts
- Deaths: 0
- Injuries: 0
- Livestock lost: 100 cattle

Ignition
- Cause: Lightning

Map
- General location of the fire in South Dakota

The McVey Fire was a wildfire that occurred in July 1939 in the Black Hills of South Dakota, United States. It burned 20,729 acres (8,389 ha) and is one of the largest fires in Black Hills history. After the fire, the United States Forest Service (USFS) accidentally planted thousands of acres of a non-native species of ponderosa pine inside the burn scar. In 2022, the USFS began replacing the trees.

== Events ==
The fire started on July 10, 1939, about 7 miles (11 km) northwest of Hill City, South Dakota. The cause was later determined to have been a lightning strike. Two post cutters working nearby noticed the fire and attempted to put it out but failed and fled to avoid the growing fire; they were initially suspected of arson but were later cleared.

Within the first 9 hours, the fire had grown to 1,600 acres (650 ha), and firefighters started a controlled burn. However, winds shifted around 11 p.m. on July 11, and the fire burned through a gap where the control line had not yet been burned. At its height, the fire grew at a speed of 2,900 acres (1,200 ha) per hour. The fire, which spread in the tree canopy, became difficult to control. The fire was contained on July 12; once a controlled burn around its perimeter was established at 9:15 that morning, the fire extinguished quickly.

Approximately 1,755 people were involved in the firefighting efforts. Almost every Civilian Conservation Corps (CCC) member in the Black Hills at the time was enlisted to help fight the McVey Fire. Other firefighters arrived from Bighorn National Forest and Shoshone National Forest, and a fire truck was sent from Denver.

== Impact ==
The exact area burned by the McVey Fire is debated. Various sources estimate that between 20,000 to 22,000 acres (8,100 to 8,900 ha) burned. The United States Forest Service (USFS) lists an official total of 20,729 acres (8,389 ha). It remains one of the largest recorded fires in the history of the Black Hills. It was the largest fire in the area since the 1931 Rochford Fire. It destroyed 18,838 acres (7,623 ha) of young trees and 12.2 million board-feet of timber. Additionally, 17 cabins burned and 100 cattle were killed by the fire. A law was passed restricting open fires and enacting penalties for violations in response to the McVey Fire.

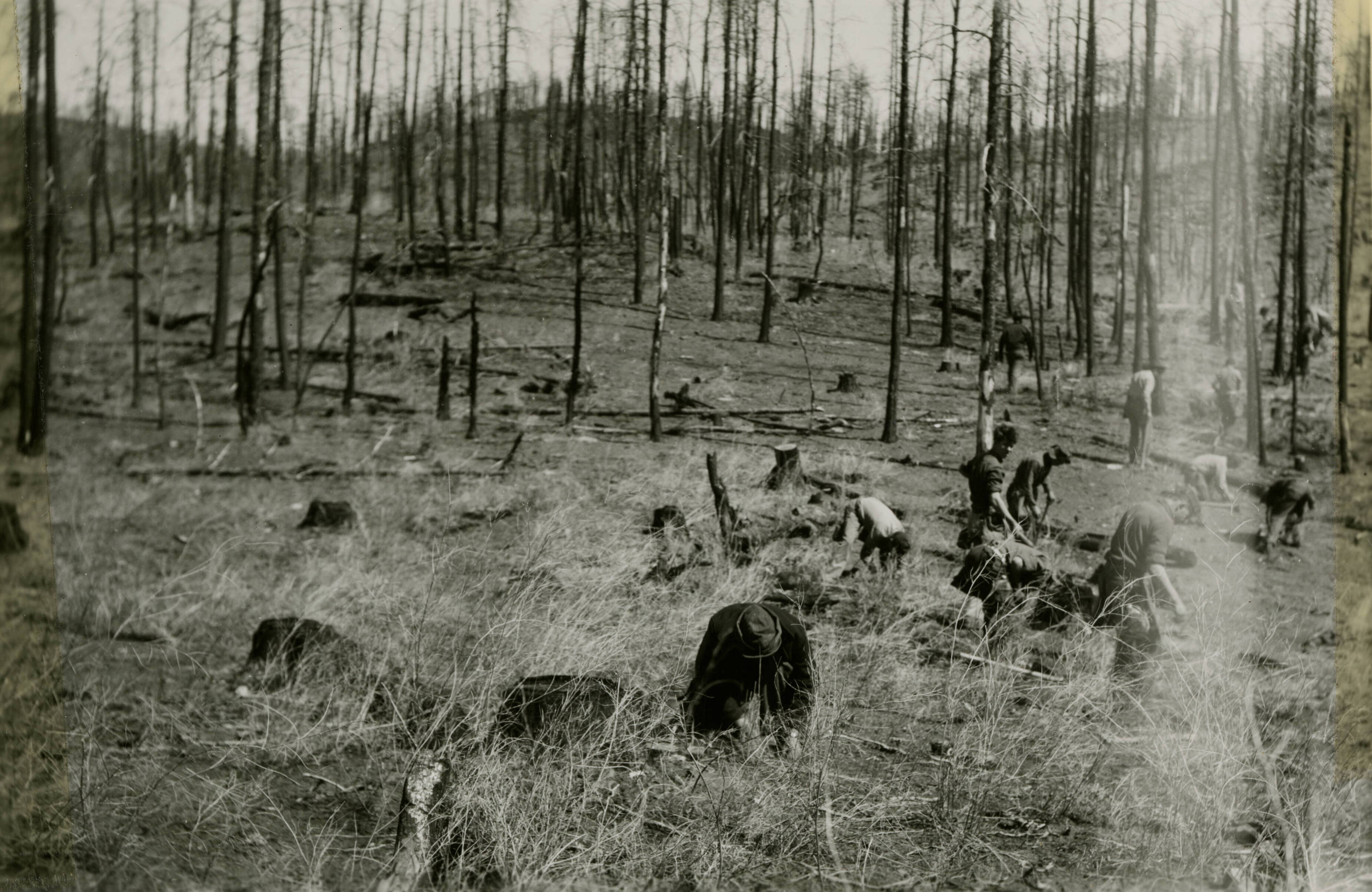
CCC workers replanting seeds inside the McVey burn scar, 1942

Shortly after the fire, the USFS, aided by the CCC, began planting ponderosa pine seedlings to replenish the burn scar. These seeds were gathered from elsewhere in Black Hills National Forest, as well as Harney National Forest. By January 1, 1940, 6,500 pounds (2,900 kg) of seeds had been planted across 4,000 acres (1,600 ha) in the burn scar area. However, later testing revealed that the planted trees were of a subspecies not native to the area. Unlike the native Black Hills pines, the new ponderosas did not shed their dead branches, had stunted growth, and were more susceptible to disease. Because the trees created a higher risk for forest fires, the USFS began forming plans in 2019 to remove the branches and eventually cut down the non-native species to replace them with native species. Dubbed the Artemis Restoration Project, work began in 2022 to replant 8,000 to 10,000 acres (3,200 to 4,000 ha) of forest.

Biodiversity in the region increased in the years following the fire. Grassy meadows succeeded the once-forested areas and grew over with bushy vegetation, including aspen trees, chokecherries, and other fruit bushes. This vegetation supported local wildlife populations during times of severe weather, such as a blizzard in 1949 that stranded deer populations with no other natural food source. In 1979, the United States Forest Service (USFS) announced a wildlife management plan for a 42,000 acres (17,000 ha) area encompassing the burn scar, with a focus on prioritizing the land's support for wildlife. A 2010 study of whitetail deer living in the burn scar area found that deer had a higher winter survivorship than those living just outside of it.

== See also ==
- List of South Dakota wildfires
