= Miller Creek (South Dakota) =

Stream in South Dakota, U.S.

Coordinates: 44°29′04″N 103°43′32″W

Miller Creek is a stream in the U.S. state of South Dakota. It is a tributary of Polo Creek which it meets adjacent to I-90 approximately 5.5 miles east of Spearfish.

Miller Creek has the name of John Miller, a pioneer homesteader.

== See also ==
- List of rivers of South Dakota
