= Cicero Peak (South Dakota) =

Mountain in South Dakota, U.S.

Highest point
- Elevation: 6,168 ft (1,880 m)
- Coordinates: 43°40′46″N 103°33′41″W

Geography
- Location: Custer County, South Dakota, United States
- Parent range: Black Hills
- Topo map: USGS Cicero Peak

Cicero Peak is a 6,168-foot (1,880 m) mountain in the Black Hills of Custer County, South Dakota. The mountain is 6 miles (9.7 km) south-southeast of the city of Custer, southwest of Custer State Park, and northwest of Wind Cave National Park. The closest community is Sanator, which is about 2 miles (3.2 km) northwest of Cicero Peak.

Cicero Peak is named after Cicero James Graham (1860–1930), a rancher near the base of the mountain.

Cicero Peak's fire lookout tower was built in 1939–1940, used for 34 years until 1974, declared surplus, and removed on March 19, 1980.

In 1990, nearby logging equipment sparked and started a large wildfire. This 1990 Cicero Peak Fire burned 14,203 acres (5,748 ha) near this mountain., including 4,510 acres (1,830 ha) within Custer State Park.

== See also ==
- List of mountains in South Dakota
