= Terry Peak =

Ski area in South Dakota, United States

- Location in the United States Location in South Dakota
- Location: Lawrence County, South Dakota, U.S.
- Nearest city: Lead – 5 miles (8.0 km); Rapid City – 50 miles (80 km)
- Coordinates: 44.329°N 103.835°W
- Vertical: 1,164 feet (355 m)
- Top elevation: 7,064 feet (2,153 m)
- Base elevation: 5,900 feet (1,798 m)
- Skiable area: 450 acres (1.8 km^{2})
- Trails: 30 total
- Lift system: 4 chairlifts: 3 high-speed quads; 1 triple 1 magic carpet
- Terrain parks: 1
- Website: terrypeak.com

Terry Peak is a mountain and ski area in the west central United States, in the Black Hills of South Dakota outside of Lead. With an elevation of 7,064 feet (2,153 m) above sea level, it is the most prominent peak in the Northern Black Hills area, and the sixth highest summit in the range; the tallest is Black Elk Peak (formerly Harney Peak) at 7,244 feet (2,208 m).

The mountain was named for Alfred Howe Terry, who had explored the area. It was first used as a ski area in 1936 by the Bald Mountain Ski Club when a rope tow was installed on Stewart Slope, named after Bertha Stewart, who donated the land. Ed Keene was one of the club's founding members. After he returned from World War II, he, along with others, created the business now known today as the Black Hills Chairlift Company. The Black Hills Chairlift did business at the Terry Peak ski area, installing the Ringer Chairlift on Kussy in 1952 as a scenic attraction, until 1954, when it was operated for winter skiing.

The Black Hills chairlift company created more lifts in the Terry Peak area, such as the Blue Chairlift (1967), Empress Chairlift (1975), Surprise Chairlift (1978), and a second Blue Chairlift (1986) built to keep up with demand. The company approved a five-year improvement plan, creating high-speed chairlifts such as Kussy (replacing the two blue chairlifts) in 1999 and Surprise in 2002.The ski area created its first half-pipe in 2000 and first terrain park in 2003. The Coeur Wharf Mining Company invested in Terry Peak in 2013 as they sponsored the third high-speed chairlift, replacing the old Empress lift.

Terry Peak hosted the NCAA Skiing Championships in 1971. Several radio stations have transmitter towers at the summit.

== Ski area description ==
- 30 runs
- 4 lifts (Black lift was removed and replaced by Sno-Carpet)
- Terrain park
- Snowmaking
- Ski and snowboard rental

== Climate ==
Climate data for Terry Peak 44.3275 N, 103.8346 W, Elevation: 6,775 ft (2,065 m) (1991–2020 normals)
Month	Jan	Feb	Mar	Apr	May	Jun	Jul	Aug	Sep	Oct	Nov	Dec	Year
Mean daily maximum °F (°C)	31.2 (−0.4)	31.7 (−0.2)	39.6 (4.2)	46.3 (7.9)	55.7 (13.2)	66.8 (19.3)	75.2 (24.0)	74.3 (23.5)	65.5 (18.6)	50.8 (10.4)	38.7 (3.7)	31.0 (−0.6)	50.6 (10.3)
Daily mean °F (°C)	21.3 (−5.9)	21.2 (−6.0)	28.6 (−1.9)	35.1 (1.7)	44.4 (6.9)	54.6 (12.6)	62.3 (16.8)	61.2 (16.2)	52.8 (11.6)	39.8 (4.3)	29.1 (−1.6)	21.7 (−5.7)	39.3 (4.1)
Mean daily minimum °F (°C)	11.4 (−11.4)	10.7 (−11.8)	17.6 (−8.0)	24.0 (−4.4)	33.1 (0.6)	42.4 (5.8)	49.4 (9.7)	48.2 (9.0)	40.0 (4.4)	28.7 (−1.8)	19.4 (−7.0)	12.3 (−10.9)	28.1 (−2.1)
Average precipitation inches (mm)	1.56 (40)	1.80 (46)	2.24 (57)	3.83 (97)	5.43 (138)	4.44 (113)	3.42 (87)	2.54 (65)	2.11 (54)	3.28 (83)	1.72 (44)	1.53 (39)	33.9 (863)
Source: PRISM Climate Group

== See also ==
- Black Hills
- List of mountains in South Dakota
