= Legion Lake Fire =

2017 wildfire in South Dakota

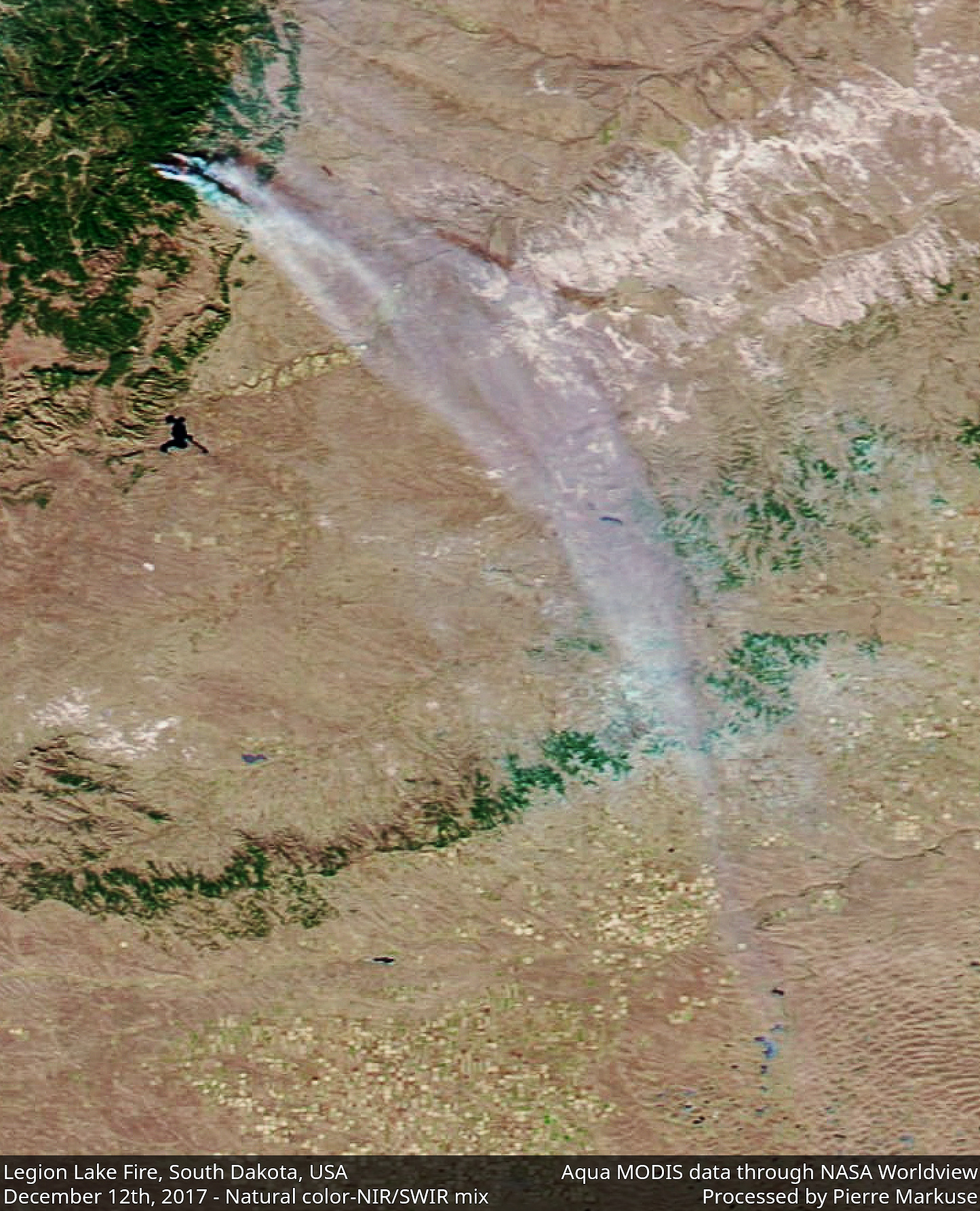
- Aerial view of Legion Lake Fire
- Date: December 11–16, 2017
- Location: Black Hills, South Dakota, U.S.
- Coordinates: 43°39′02.6″N 103°22′53.1″W

Statistics
- Status: Extinguished
- Burned area: 53,875 acres (21,802 ha; 218.02 km^{2})

Ignition
- Cause: Downed tree on electrical wire
- Motive: Accidental

Map
- General area of the fire in South Dakota

The Legion Lake Fire was a wildfire that occurred in December 2017 in the Black Hills of South Dakota, United States. It burned 53,875 acres (218.02 km^{2}), making it the third-largest wildfire in South Dakota and Black Hills history. Custer State Park and Wind Cave National Park were particularly affected, and the fire disrupted the parks' wild bison and burro herds and other wildlife. The fire was later determined to have been caused by a tree knocking over a power line. Affected landowners later sued the telephone company, claiming negligence was to blame for the fire.

== Events ==
On December 11, 2017, the fire started at Wilson's Corner—the intersection of Needles Highway and South Dakota Highway 16A—about 1 mile (1.6 km) north of Legion Lake inside Custer State Park. High winds felled a tree, which in turn knocked over an active power line. The spark ignited piles of dead tree tops nearby, which had been discarded as unwanted timber. Additionally, low humidity, high winds, and unseasonably warm weather allowed the fire to grow quickly. As wildfires are not common in the region during the winter months, firefighters were caught off-guard and less prepared for a large fire; some regular battalions were away firefighting in California.

The fire was reported at 7:34 a.m., and by the time the first park rangers arrived, the fire had already grown to between 10–30 acres (4.0–12.1 ha) and began moving southeast. More than 200 firefighters from nearby communities, including some from Wyoming, responded to the fire. The towns of Buffalo Gap and Fairburn were asked to evacuate on December 12, and South Dakota Highways 79 and 87 South were closed in the area. On the night of December 12–13 alone, the fire grew in size from 6 sq mi (3,800 acres) to 55 sq mi (35,000 acres) after jumping Wildlife Loop Road; by that time, about 200 homes had been forced to evacuate.

Firefighting efforts brought the fire up to 50% containment by December 14, at which point evacuation orders were lifted, but the parks remained closed. High winds that were quickly spreading the fire began to subside. On December 16, the fire was declared completely contained.

== Impact ==
Overall, the fire burned 53,875 acres (218.02 km^{2}), making it the third-largest wildfire in both South Dakota and Black Hills history. It spanned across parts of Custer State Park, Wind Cave National Park, and private ranch land. It spared several tourist attractions and landmarks inside the parks but burned most of the area around Wildlife Loop Road, a popular scenic route through Custer State Park.

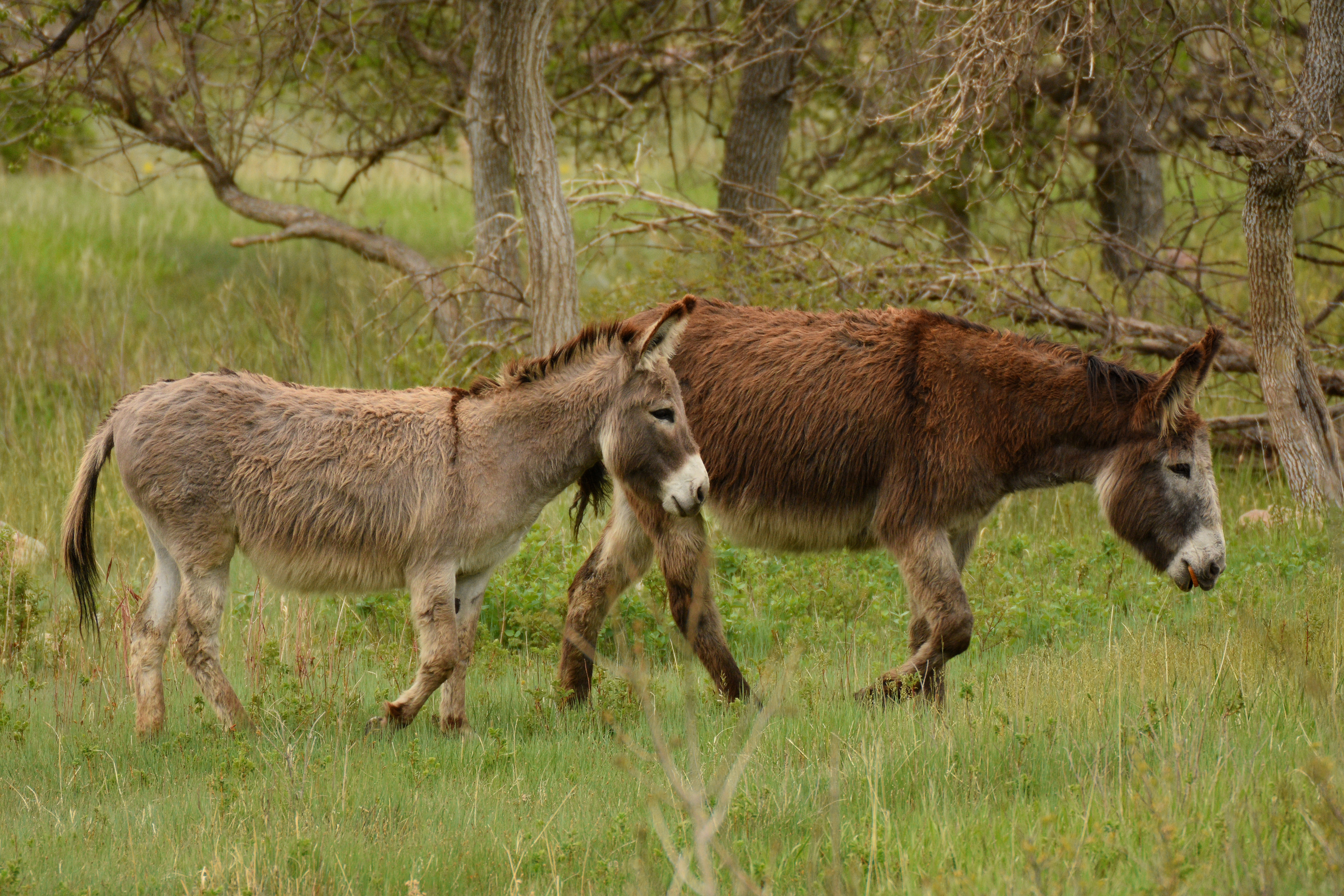
Wild burros in Custer State Park

The fire threatened the parks' wildlife, particularly wild bison herds in Custer and Wind Cave National Parks, and Custer's wild burro herd. These herds were moved into corrals for protection. All nine burros in the park suffered injuries; three were later humanely euthanized. Four bison were also euthanized as a result of the fire, and others sustained less serious injuries. Much of the bison herds' grazing area was burned, as well as its fenced perimeter. Other large game animals, including elk, were also injured or killed in the fire.

In response to the fire, Custer State Park officials increased the annual area they clear of debris from 1,000 acres (400 ha) to 3,000 acres (1,200 ha). In 2018, the park was awarded a $1.8 million grant to aid in recovery efforts, which covered costs related to reseeding and weeding the burn scar.

== Lawsuit ==
In August 2018, several people whose land had been burned in the fire filed a lawsuit against Black Hills Power and Hanson Communications, alleging that the installation of the power line had damaged a tree's root system, causing it to fall onto the line and begin the fire. The landowners further said the company failed to carry out a risk assessment. Both companies contested the lawsuit and denied any wrongdoing; Hanson Communications, doing business as Mt. Rushmore Telephone Company, called the fire an "act of God".

== See also ==
- List of South Dakota wildfires
