= Polo Creek =

Stream in South Dakota, U.S.

Coordinates: 44°30′32″N 103°43′09″W

Polo Creek is a stream in the U.S. state of South Dakota.

Polo Creek heads near Polo Peak, from which it takes its creative name.

== See also ==
- List of rivers of South Dakota
