= Miller Creek (Tug Fork) =

Stream in West Virginia, U.S.

Coordinates: 37°45′33″N 82°19′06″W

Miller Creek is a stream in the U.S. state of West Virginia. It is a tributary of Tug Fork.

Miller Creek most likely derives its name from Emile Millard, a pioneer settler.

== See also ==
- List of rivers of West Virginia
