= White Draw Fire =

2012 wildfire in South Dakota, United States

- Location: Black Hills, South Dakota

Statistics
- Burned area: 8,640 acres (3,500 ha)

Impacts
- Deaths: 4 (indirectly)

Ignition
- Cause: Sparked by a vehicle and spread by dry vegetation

White Draw Fire was a wildfire in South Dakota, United States, that started on Friday, June 29, 2012. The fire burned a total area of 14 square miles (8640 acres), mainly the U.S. Forest Service land. The fire did not harm any civilian population or livestock; however, a military C-130 MAFFS air tanker crashed in the Black Hills during firefighting.

== Origin ==
The fire was sparked by a vehicle 80 miles southwest of Rapid City on Friday afternoon. On the first day, it moved five miles due to wind gusts. It was fueled by dry bush and dry trees.

== Description ==
By Sunday, the fire was 30% contained. The fire was primarily burning U.S. Forest Service land, and five homes were asked to evacuate. On July 5, the fire was 80% contained and had burned almost 9000 acres. The fire was fully contained by July 6 due to the efforts of 400 firefighters, helicopters, aircraft, and rainfall. The fire did not harm any people or livestock but affected some ranches. On July 1, an airforce C130 firefighter aircraft operated by North Carolina National Guard crashed with a crew of six, after it got stuck in a microburst, a small and intense thunderstorm.

=== Plane crash ===
On Sunday, July 1, a military C-130 MAFFS air tanker crashed in the Black Hills while fighting the White Draw Fire. The plane crashed at 6:00 p.m. after making two drops of retardant on the fire. The cause of the crash was a microburst. Four out of the six-member crew were killed. The four killed in the crash included Lt. Col. Paul Mikeal of Mooresville, Master Sgt. Robert Cannon of Charlotte, Maj. Joe McCormick of Belmont, and Major Ryan Scott David of Boone. Immediately after the crash, a helicopter landed and took two survivors to a Rapid City hospital.

=== Memorial site ===
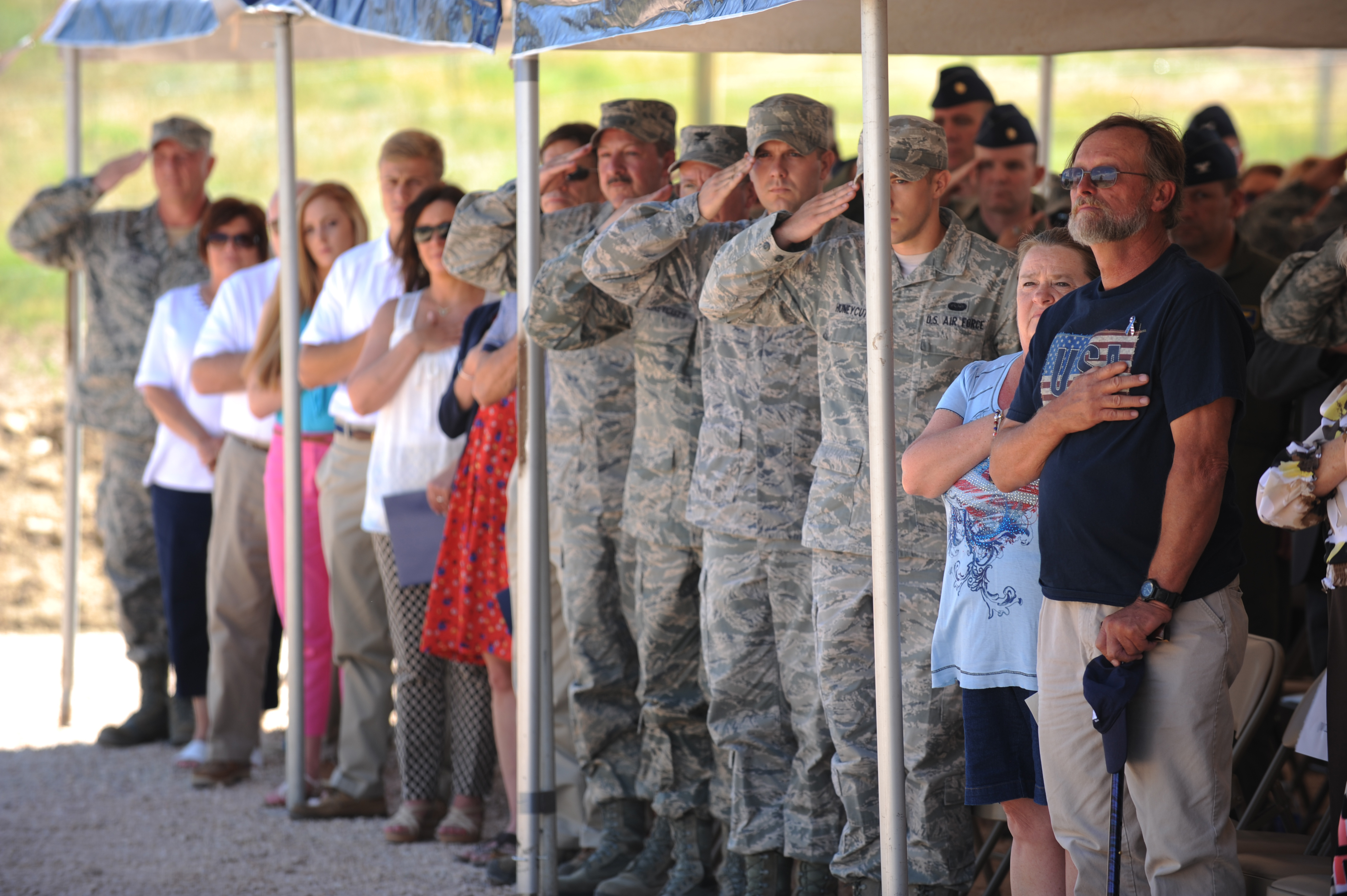
Family members, friends, and colleagues pay homage to the airmen of the North Carolina Air National Guard C-130 Modular Airborne Fire Fighting System 7 aircraft that crashed while supporting the White Draw Fire one year ago this day, during the unveiling of an interpretive sign near Edgemont.

On July 1, 2013, a memorial site was dedicated to honoring the four people who died in the Modular Airborne Firefighting System (MAFFS) C-130 air tanker crash in White Draw Fire in 2012. The memorial site is located near the point of origin, approximately 6 miles northeast of Edgemont on Highway 18. It consists of a gravel parking area with room for about six vehicles, and it has two interpretive panels.

== Closure ==
The Black Hills National Forest management ordered a temporary closure of the White Draw Fire to limit the use of land by the public. The residents, persons with permits, people involved in firefighting activities were exempted from the closure.

== See also ==
- List of South Dakota wildfires
