= Miller Creek (Black River tributary) =

Stream in Wayne County, Missouri, U.S.

Coordinates: 36.9331086°N 90.5228925°W

Miller Creek is a stream in Wayne County in the U.S. state of Missouri. It is a tributary of Black River.

Miller Creek has the name of Ezekiel Miller, an early citizen.

== See also ==
- List of rivers of Missouri
