= Millers Creek (Ohio) =

Stream in Ohio, U.S.

Coordinates: 39°27′49″N 84°21′08″W

Millers Creek is a stream in the U.S. state of Ohio. The 5-mile (8.0 km) long stream is a tributary to Shaker Creek.

Millers Creek has the name of the local Miller family.
