= Sanator, South Dakota =

Unincorporated community in South Dakota, U.S.

Coordinates: 43°41′48″N 103°36′21″W

Sanator is an unincorporated community that is located in Custer County, in the U.S. state of South Dakota.

== History ==
A post office called Sanator was established in 1921, and it remained in operation until 1962. The community derived its name from the local South Dakota Tuberculosis Sanitorium.
