= Odakota Mountain =

Mountain in South Dakota, United States

- Location within South Dakota

Highest point
- Elevation: 7,198 ft (2,194 m) (Note: GNIS records an elevation of 7,205 ft (2,196 m))
- Coordinates: 43°55′25″N 103°45′16″W

Geography
- Location: Pennington County, South Dakota, US
- Parent range: Black Hills

Odakota Mountain is a mountain in western Pennington County, South Dakota, about 9 miles (14 km) west of Hill City. It is the 2nd highest point in the Black Hills and in South Dakota.

Until 1969, the U.S. Board on Geographic Names listed no name for this peak, though the Black Hills National Forest supervisor stated its name was Murphy Mountain. At that time, Evelyn Loretta Bradfelt bought a ranch near the mountain and petitioned the Board on Geographic Names to name it Odakota Mountain. She believed this word was an indigenous word meaning "establishment of peace". Professor Harvey Markowitz verified "Odakota" is a Dakota variant of Lakota words "olakota" and "wolakota", which carry the meaning of "friendship" or "alliance" or "peaceful relationship".

In May 2019, a professional surveyor found the mountain's highest point to be 7,197.70 feet above sea level on the North American Vertical Datum (NAVD88) by taking precise GNSS measurements. The highest point and surrounding area is a flat area in the trees a short distance west of an outcropping of limestone which is slightly lower. A bench mark disk was set in concrete with a sign indicating the highest point.
