= Polo Peak =

Mountain in South Dakota, United States

Coordinates: 44°24′53″N 103°45′28″W

Polo Peak is a summit in South Dakota, in the United States. With an elevation of 5,413 feet (1,650 m), Polo Peak is the 143rd highest summit in the state of South Dakota.

Polo Peak was named for the fact polo was played at its base.
