= National Register of Historic Places listings in Hamlin County, South Dakota =

Location of Hamlin County in South Dakota

This is a list of the National Register of Historic Places listings in Hamlin County, South Dakota.

This is intended to be a complete list of the properties on the National Register of Historic Places in Hamlin County, South Dakota, United States. The locations of National Register properties for which the latitude and longitude coordinates are included below, may be seen in a map.

There are 15 properties listed on the National Register in the county.

This National Park Service list is complete through NPS recent listings posted December 12, 2025.

== Current listings ==
	Name on the Register	Image	Date listed	Location	City or town	Description
1	Bryant Masonic Lodge 118		March 26, 2020 (#100005110)	204 East Main St. 44°35′26″N 97°27′47″W	Bryant	
2	Estelline Bandstand and Gazebo Park		November 30, 1999 (#99001434)	105 N. Main; 44°34′22″N 96°54′09″W	Estelline	
3	First National Bank of Norden	First National Bank of Norden	October 26, 2005 (#05001189)	503 Main Ave. 44°34′56″N 97°12′37″W	Lake Norden	
4	First State Bank of Hazel		February 21, 1997 (#97000147)	Main St. west of its junction with Highway 22; 44°45′33″N 97°22′55″W	Hazel	
5	Garfield Church and Cemetery		February 15, 2012 (#12000036)	19213–19295 443rd Ave; 44°35′16″N 97°21′05″W	Bryant vicinity	
6	Hamlin County Courthouse	Hamlin County Courthouse	October 12, 2000 (#00001225)	300 4th St. 44°39′25″N 97°12′13″W	Hayti	
7	M. O. Hanson Building	M. O. Hanson Building	July 28, 2011 (#11000486)	126 E. Main St. 44°43′19″N 97°02′09″W	Castlewood	
8	Hendrick and Waldur Hendrickson Farm		November 13, 1985 (#85003485)	Highway 28; 44°35′06″N 97°15′26″W	Lake Norden	
9	Hoffelt Drug Store	Hoffelt Drug Store	February 19, 2008 (#08000050)	212 Main St. 44°34′35″N 96°54′08″W	Estelline	
10	Kant Hotel		October 31, 1985 (#85003449)	North of Highway 28; 44°35′26″N 97°28′04″W	Bryant	
11	Charles and Mary Lohr House		July 19, 1982 (#82003927)	1705 State Ave. 44°34′23″N 96°53′37″W	Estelline	
12	Old St. Mary's Catholic Parish House		December 27, 1988 (#88002840)	5th Ave. and Underwood St. 44°35′19″N 97°27′57″W	Bryant	
13	South Dakota Dept. of Transportation Bridge No. 29-221-060		December 9, 1993 (#93001291)	Local road over the Big Sioux River; 44°42′59″N 97°02′41″W	Castlewood	Replaced
14	South Dakota Dept. of Transportation Bridge No. 29-279-010		December 9, 1993 (#93001292)	Local road over Stray Horse Creek; 44°47′24″N 96°55′35″W	Castlewood	
15	Jacob and Amelia Tuohino Farm		November 13, 1985 (#85003495)	South of Highway 28; 44°34′29″N 97°18′39″W	Lake Norden	

== See also ==
- List of National Historic Landmarks in South Dakota
- National Register of Historic Places listings in South Dakota
