= South Dakota Highway 28 =

State highway in South Dakota, United States

Highway 28

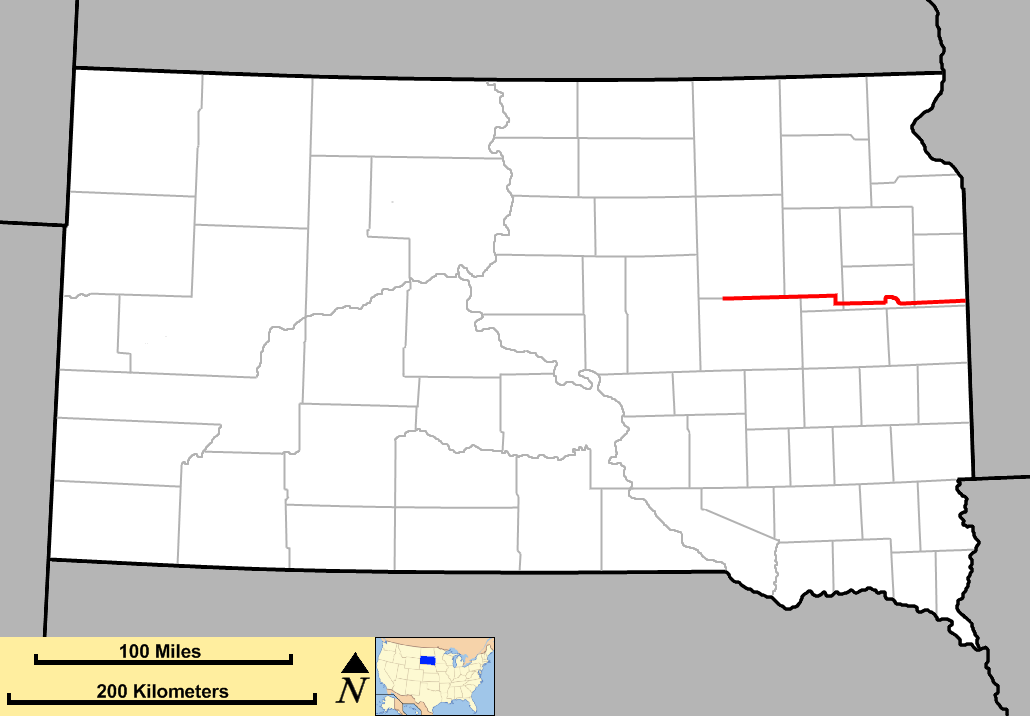
- Map of South Dakota with SD 28 in red

Route information
- Maintained by SDDOT
- Length: 105.937 mi (170.489 km)
- Existed: c. 1934–present

Major junctions
- West end: US 281 west of Hitchcock
- SD 37 east of Hitchcock; SD 25 from east of Willow Lake to west of Bryant; US 81 near Lake Norden; I-29 west of Toronto; SD 15 west of Toronto
- East end: MN 271 at the Minnesota state line near Astoria

Location
- Country: United States
- State: South Dakota
- Counties: Spink; Clark; Hamlin; Deuel

Highway system
- South Dakota State Trunk Highway System; Interstate; US; State
← SD 27	→ I-29

South Dakota Highway 28 (SD 28) is a 105.937-mile (170.489 km) state highway in the east-central South Dakota, United States, that connects Hitchcock, Estelline, and Toronto.

SD 28 was established between 1932 and 1935. It replaced SD 26. It was incrementally extended to its current path.

== Route description ==
=== Spink County ===
SD 28 begins at an intersection with U.S. Route 281 (387th Avenue) west of Hitchcock. This intersection, on the line of northwestern Beadle County and southwestern Spink County, is also the eastern terminus of County Road 2 (CR 2; 190th Street). SD 28 takes 190th Street to the east, along the county line. East of 390th Avenue, it enters the northern part of Hitchcock. Just west of 391st Avenue (the southern terminus of CR 13 and the northern terminus of CR 11), it leaves the city limits of Hitchcock. Between 397th and 398th avenues, it crosses over the James River. The highway then intersects SD 37 (400th Avenue). Just east of 402nd Avenue, it crosses over Foster Creek. An intersection with 406th Avenue (northern terminus of CR 03 and southern terminus of CR 27) leads to Doland. An intersection with 411th Avenue (northern terminus of CR 31 and southern terminus of CR 01) leads to Yale. Between this intersection and one with 413th Avenue, Spink County ends, and the highway begins to travel on the Beadle–Clark county line.

=== Clark County ===
SD 28 continues to the east. An intersection with 415th Avenue (northern terminus of CR 37 and the southern terminus of CR 17) leads to Carpenter. An intersection with 418th Avenue leads to Iroquois. At this intersection, the highway enters Clark County proper. Just west of 419th Avenue, it crosses over Shue Creek. West of CR 49 (423rd Avenue), it crosses over Redstone Creek. Between 423rd Avenue and CR 46 (424th Avenue), the highway crosses over the creek again. East of 428th Avenue, it enters the northwestern part of Willow Lake. East of an intersection with the northern terminus of Jackson Street, SD 28 skirts along the southern part of Mud Lake. An intersection with CR 47 (429th Avenue) is signed as a "truck route". East of this intersection, it crosses over some railroad tracks of BNSF Railway and leaves the city limits of Willow Lake. East of an intersection with the southern terminus of CR 12 (432nd Avenue), the highway begins a concurrency with SD 25. This intersection is also the western terminus of CR 40 (190th Street). The two state highways travel due south for approximately 3 miles (4.8 km). When SD 28 splits off, it resumes its eastward direction. This intersection is the eastern terminus of CR 38 (193rd Street). At an intersection with 436th Avenue, it enters the southwestern part of Hamlin County.

=== Hamlin County ===
Almost immediately, SD 28 enters the southwestern part of Bryant. Just east of South Broadway Street, it passes the city park. An intersection with the southern terminus of South Railway Street leads to the business district. East of an intersection with the southern terminus of South William Street, the highway leaves the city limits of Bryant. Just east of 445th Avenue, it crosses over Dolph Creek. East of 449th Avenue, it intersects the southern terminus of SD 21. Just east of this intersection, SD 28 enters the northern part of Lake Norden. An intersection with the northern terminus of Burlington Street leads to the South Dakota Amateur Baseball Hall of Fame. Just east of this intersection, the highway begins a curve to the east-southeast and leaves the city limits of Lake Norden. It then skirts along the southern part of the city's namesake, Lake Norden. The highway curves to the northeast and travels between Lake Norden and Lake Mary. North of Lake Mary, it curves to the east-southeast. Just east of 452nd Avenue, the highway curves back to the east. East of 453rd Avenue, it intersects US 81 (454th Avenue). The two highways travel concurrently to the north for approximately 1 mile (1.6 km), while the roadway continues to the east as 193rd Street. At an intersection with 192nd Street, the two highways split. SD 28 takes 192nd Street to the east. Just west of 456th Avenue, the highway curves to the east-northeast. East of this intersection, it intersects NW Lake Drive, which leads to the Saaraners Beach Lake Access. Just east of this intersection, it curves to the east-southeast and begins to travel between Lake Poinsett and Dry Lake. It curves to the east-northeast and crosses over the northern part of Lake Poinsett. The highway curves to the east-southeast. East of 458th Avenue, it curves to the southeast. Just north of 193rd Street, it curves to the south. It curves to the east-southeast. Just west of 460th Avenue, it curves to the east-northeast. Just east of 461st Avenue, it curves back to the east-southeast. Between 462nd and 463rd avenues, it curves to the east-northeast again. Just west of 464th Avenue, it crosses over the Big Sioux River and curves to a nearly due-east direction. Just east of Sorenson Road, it passes a sewage disposal pond and enters the west-central part of Estelline. An intersection with 6th Street leads to Beckman Field and Estelline Elementary & High School. East of Eastwood Drive, the highway leaves the city limits of Estelline. At an intersection with 466th Avenue, it enters the southwestern part of Deuel County.

=== Deuel County ===
Between an intersection with the southern terminus of CR 518 (467th Avenue) and one with 468th Avenue, SD 28 crosses over Munky Run. Just east of 472nd Avenue, it has an interchange with Interstate 29 (I-29). East of 475th Avenue, it intersects the southern terminus of SD 15 (476th Avenue). Between 477th Avenue and CR 315 (479th Avenue), the highway travels through central parts of Toronto. East of CR 11 (487th Avenue), the highway reaches its eastern terminus. It ends at the Minnesota state line. Here, the roadway continues to the east as Minnesota State Highway 271 (MN 271).

=== National Highway System ===
The only part of SD 28 that is included as part of the National Highway System, a system of routes determined to be the most important for the nation's economy, mobility and defense, is the small portion concurrent with US 81 near Lake Norden.

== History ==
SD 28 was established between 1932 and 1935. At that time, it replaced SD 26 and extended from SD 25 west of Bryant to US 77 east of Estelline. In the mid-1950s, it was extended westward. An extension further to the west, to SD 45 north of Miller, may have been signed briefly, but was not indicated as such by 1970. Between 1948 and 1953, it was extended eastward to the Minnesota state line.

== Major intersections ==
County	Location	mi	km	Destinations	Notes
Beadle–Spink county line		0.000	0.000	US 281 (387th Avenue) / CR 2 west (190th Street) – US 14, Redfield	Western terminus of SD 28; eastern terminus of CR 2
Beadle–Spink county line		15.781	25.397	SD 37 (400th Avenue) – US 212, Huron	
Clark–Beadle county line	No major junctions				
Clark		49.866	80.252	SD 25 north / 190th Street east – US 212	Western end of SD 25 concurrency; roadway continues to the east as CR 40 (190th Street).
Clark		52.865	85.078	SD 25 south / 193rd Street west – De Smet	Eastern end of SD 25 concurrency; roadway continues to the west as CR 38 (193rd Street).
Hamlin		66.675	107.303	SD 21 north – Hayti	Southern terminus of SD 21
Hamlin		70.984	114.238	US 81 south (454th Avenue) / 193rd Street east – Arlington	Western end of US 81 concurrency; roadway continues to the east as 193rd Street.
Hamlin		74.205	119.421	US 81 north (454th Avenue) / 192nd Street west – Watertown	Eastern end of US 81 concurrency; roadway continues to the west as 192nd Street.
Deuel		90.548– 90.864	145.723– 146.231	I-29 – Brookings, Watertown	I-29 exit 150; former US 77 south
Deuel		96.249	154.898	SD 15 north (476th Avenue) – Clear Lake, Milbank	Southern terminus of SD 15; former US 77 north
Minnesota state line
Lincoln		105.937	170.489	MN 271 south – Hendricks	Eastern terminus; continuation into Minnesota
1.000 mi = 1.609 km; 1.000 km = 0.621 mi: Concurrency terminus

== See also ==
- List of state highways in South Dakota
