= South Dakota Highway 21 =

State highway in South Dakota, United States

Highway 21

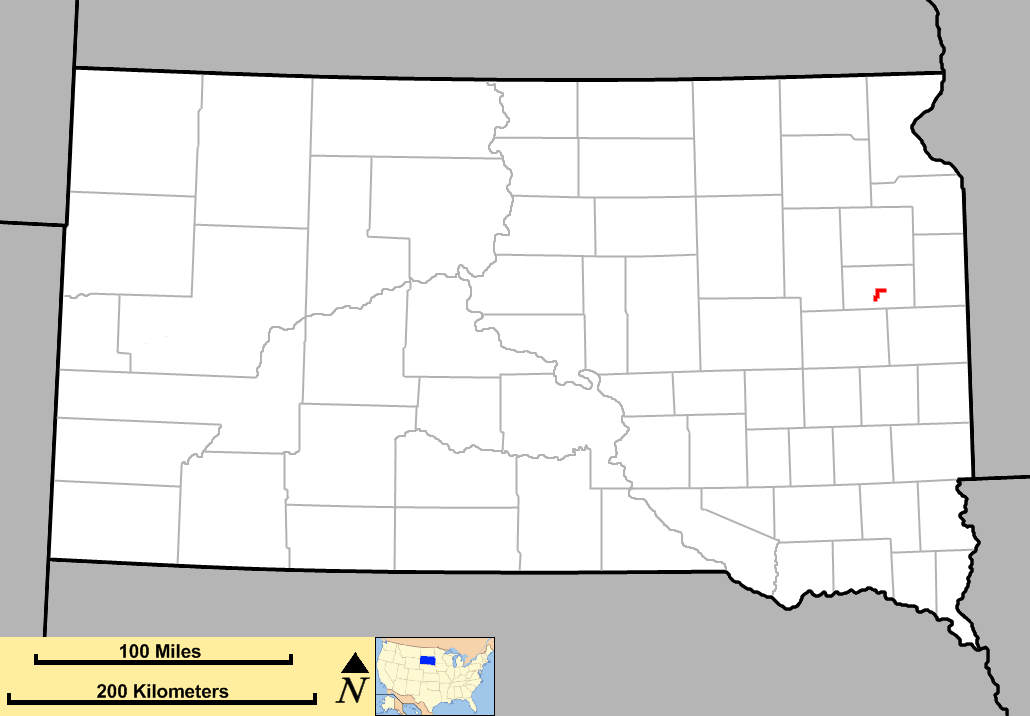
- Map of South Dakota with SD 21 in red

Route information
- Maintained by SDDOT
- Length: 9.470 mi (15.240 km)
- Existed: 1926–present

Major junctions
- South end: SD 28 west of Lake Norden
- North end: US 81 east of Hayti

Location
- Country: United States
- State: South Dakota
- Counties: Hamlin

Highway system
- South Dakota State Trunk Highway System; Interstate; US; State
← SD 20	→ SD 22

South Dakota Highway 21 (SD 21) is a 9.470-mile (15.240 km) state highway in south-central Hamlin Countym South Dakota, that connects Lake Norden and Hayti.

SD 21 originally extended from the Nebraska state line to the North Dakota state line, completely concurrent with U.S. Route 81 (US 81). By the mid-1930s, only the current part of the highway remained.

== Route description ==
SD 21 begins at an intersection with SD 28 just northwest of the main part of Lake Norden. It travels to the north. Almost immediately, it crosses over Dolph Creek. It travels just west of Lake Norden. North of 192nd Street, it curves to the east. Approximately 2,000 feet (610 m) later, the highway curves to the north-northeast. Just south of 190th Street, it curves back to the north. Just south of 189th Street, it begins to parallel the eastern part of Lake Marsh. It then enters the southwestern part of Hayti. In the west-central part of the town, it turns right onto Main Avenue and heads to the east. Between 2nd and 3rd streets, it passes a U.S. post office and the Hayti Fire Hall. At an intersection with 4th Street, SD 21 turns left and heads north again. At this intersection is the Hamlin County Courthouse. At an intersection with Redbird Avenue, it turns right and heads to the east. East of 7th Street, it leaves Hayti and continues to the east until it reaches its eastern terminus, an intersection with US 81. Here, the roadway continues as 188th Street.

=== National Highway System ===
No part of SD 21 is included as part of the National Highway System, a system of routes determined to be the most important for the nation's economy, mobility and defense.

== History ==
When SD 21 was established in 1926, it was completely concurrent with US 81, which was also established at this time. This concurrency extended from the Nebraska state line to the North Dakota state line. By 1935, all of SD 21 was decommissioned except for its current alignment.

== Major intersections ==
The entire route is in Hamlin County.

Location	mi	km	Destinations	Notes
	0.000	0.000	SD 28 – US 81, Lake Norden, Bryant	Southern terminus
	9.470	15.240	US 81 / 188th Avenue east – Arlington, Watertown	Northern terminus; roadway continues to the east as 188th Avenue.
1.000 mi = 1.609 km; 1.000 km = 0.621 mi

== See also ==
- List of state highways in South Dakota
