= Foster Creek =

Foster Creek may refer to:

- Foster Creek (Missouri), a stream in Missouri
- Foster Creek (James River), a stream in South Dakota
- Foster Creek (Stanley County, South Dakota), a stream in South Dakota
