= Minnesota State Highway 271 =

State highway in Minnesota, United States

Trunk Highway 271
- MN 271 highlighted in red

Route information
- Maintained by MnDOT
- Length: 8.591 mi (13.826 km)
- Existed: July 1, 1949–present

Major junctions
- South end: MN 19 / CSAH 1 at Hendricks Township, near Hendricks
- North end: SD 28 at the Minnesota — South Dakota state line

Location
- Country: United States
- State: Minnesota
- Counties: Lincoln County

Highway system
- Minnesota Trunk Highway System; Interstate; US; State; Legislative; Scenic
← MN 270	→ MN 274

Minnesota State Highway 271 (MN 271) is a 8.591-mile-long (13.826 km) highway in southwest Minnesota, which runs from its intersection with State Highway 19 in Hendricks Township and continues north and west to its terminus at the South Dakota state line, where the roadway becomes South Dakota Highway 28.

== Route description ==
Highway 271 serves as a north–south route in southwest Minnesota between State Highway 19, the city of Hendricks, and the South Dakota state line near the towns of Astoria and Toronto.

Highway 271 is also known as Division Street in Hendricks.

Near its northern terminus, Highway 271 turns west, and the roadway becomes South Dakota Highway 28 upon crossing the state line.

The route is legally defined as Route 271 in the Minnesota Statutes.

== History ==
Highway 271 was authorized on July 1, 1949.

The route was paved at the time it was marked except for the short east-west section, which was paved in the mid-1950s.

== Major intersections ==
The entire route is in Lincoln County.

Location	mi	km	Destinations	Notes
Hendricks Township	0.000	0.000	MN 19 – State Line, Ivanhoe	
Hendricks Township	2.030	3.267	CSAH 14	
Hendricks	3.236	5.208	CSAH 17 east (Railroad Street)	
Hendricks	3.422	5.507	CSAH 17 west (Garfield Street)	
Hendricks Township	5.462	8.790	CSAH 1	
Hansonville Township	8.689	13.984	CSAH 19	
Hansonville Township	8.719	14.032	SD 28 – Toronto	Continuation beyond South Dakota state line
1.000 mi = 1.609 km; 1.000 km = 0.621 mi
