= South Dakota Highway 22 =

State highway in South Dakota, United States

Highway 22

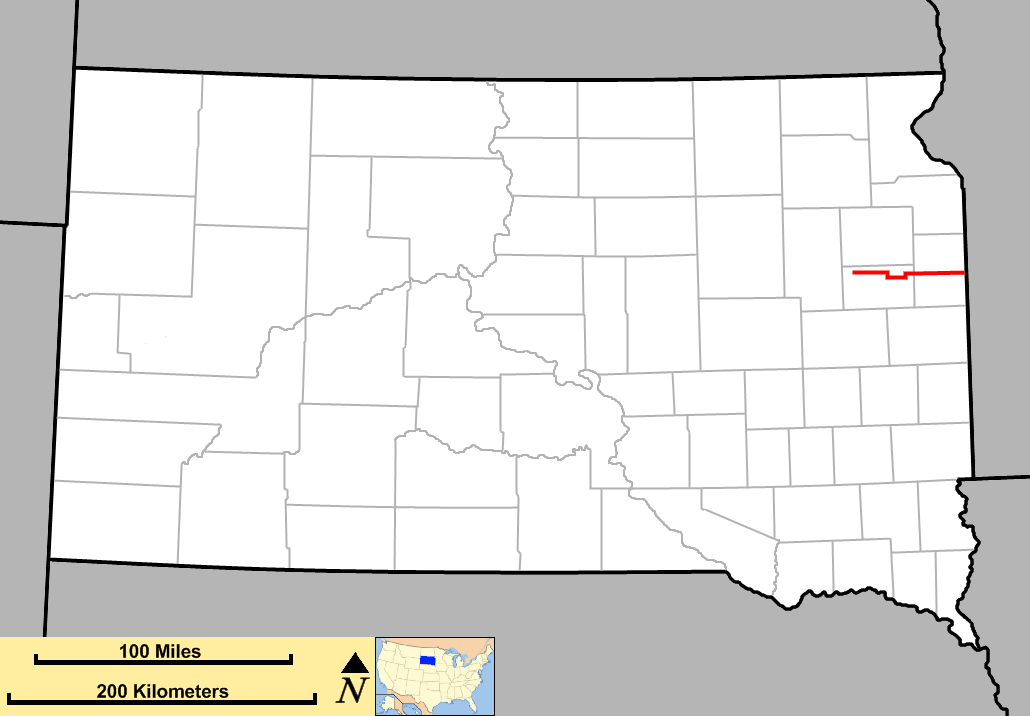
- Map of South Dakota with SD 22 in red

Route information
- Maintained by SDDOT
- Length: 48.546 mi (78.127 km)
- Existed: c. 1926–present

Major junctions
- West end: 1st Street / CR 181 / Mustang Avenue in Hazel
- US 81 from northwest of Castlewood to west of Castlewood; I-29 west of Clear Lake; SD 15 in Clear Lake; SD 101 south of Gary
- East end: MN 68 at the Minnesota state line south of Gary

Location
- Country: United States
- State: South Dakota
- Counties: Hamlin; Deuel

Highway system
- South Dakota State Trunk Highway System; Interstate; US; State
← SD 21	→ SD 23

South Dakota Highway 22 (SD 22) is a 48.546-mile-long (78.127 km) state highway in Hamlin and Deuel counties in South Dakota, United States. It connects Hazel and Clear Lake.

SD 22 originally extended from the Wyoming state line, following what is now U.S. Route 212 (US 212). When the US 212 was established, SD 22 was truncated to travel from SD 45 in northern Hand County to SD 41 (current US 281) south of Redfield. This is now SD 26. The current alignment was established in the mid-1930s, with a north–south portion from Hazel to US 212. This last portion was decommissioned in the 1990s.

== Route description ==
SD 22 begins at an intersection with the northern terminus of 1st Street and the southern terminus of Mustang Avenue in the north-central part of Hazel, within the northwestern part of Hamlin County. Here, the roadway continues to the west as Hamlin County Road 181/181st Street. SD 22 travels to the east. Just east of William Street, it crosses over some railroad tracks of BNSF Railway. Just east of 444th Avenue, it travels just south of the Baxter Slough State Public Shooting Area. East of 449th Avenue, it travels through Thomas. the highway then curves to the southeast to travel around the southwestern part of Clear Lake. Just east of 451st Avenue, it curves to the east-northeast. Just west of 452nd Avenue, it curves to the east-southeast. East of 454th Avenue, it travels through the Five Ponds area. It then intersects US 81. The two highways travel concurrently to the south-southeast. Here, the roadway continues to the east as 181st Street. At 183rd Street, SD 22 splits off to the east-northeast. Just east of 458th Avenue, it crosses over the Big Sioux River and then travels just north of Castlewood. An intersection with the northern terminus of 2nd Avenue leads to Castlewood. An intersection with 459th Avenue and the northern terminus of 4th Avenue, which is signed as a "city truck route", leads to a city park. East of 461st Avenue, it crosses over Stray Horse Creek and then curves to the north-northeast. Almost immediately, it curves back to the east. East of 465th Avenue, it has an interchange with Interstate 29 (I-29). While traveling under the Interstate highway, it enters the west-central part of Deuel County.

SD 22 continues to the east through rural areas of the county. East of 475th Avenue, it enters the southern part of Clear Lake. It has an intersection with SD 15. Just after leaving Clear Lake, it crosses over Hidewood Creek. Just to the east of 476th Avenue, it curves to the southeast to travel around the southeastern part of Clear Lake. Just west of Clear Lake Road, it begins to curve to the east-northeast. Just west of 479th Avenue, it curves to the east again. Just west of 485th Avenue, it crosses over Cobb Creek. Just to the east of this intersection is a second crossing of this creek. Just west of 486th Avenue, the highway curves to the east-northeast. Along a curve to the south-southeast, it intersects the southern terminus of SD 101. It crosses over Cobb Creek for a third time and then curves to the south-southwest. Just north of County Road 22A (CR 22A; 478th Avenue), the highway curves back to the east. Just east of 184th Street, it reaches its eastern terminus, at the Minnesota state line. Here, the roadway continues as Minnesota State Highway 68 (MN 68).

SD 22 is not part of the National Highway System, a system of routes determined to be the most important for the nation's economy, mobility and defense.

== History ==
When SD 22 was originally established in the 1920s, its western terminus was at the Wyoming state line. It followed what is now US 212 along this path. When US 212 was established in 1927, SD 22 was shifted onto a new alignment. It traveled from SD 45 in northern Hand County to SD 41 (what is now US 281) south of Redfield. This alignment is now the path of SD 26. The current path of SD 22 was established by 1936, and included a north–south segment from Hazel to US 212. This north–south segment was decommissioned in the 1990s.

== Major intersections ==
County	Location	mi	km	Destinations	Notes
Hamlin	Hazel	0.000	0.000	CR P west (181st Street West) / CR L north (Mustang Avenue North) / 1st Street South	Western terminus of SD 22; northern terminus of 1st Street; southern terminus of Mustang Avenue; roadway continues west as 181st Street/CR P; Mustang Avenue North/CR L is former SD 22 west.
Hamlin		13.487	21.705	US 81 north – Watertown	Western end of US 81 concurrency
Hamlin		16.608	26.728	US 81 south – Arlington	Eastern end of US 81 concurrency
Hamlin–Deuel county line		25.231– 25.585	40.605– 41.175	I-29 – Brookings, Watertown	I-29 exit 164
Deuel	Clear Lake	35.828	57.660	SD 15 – SD 28, US 212	
Deuel		46.745	75.229	SD 101 north – Gary	Southern terminus of SD 101; former SD 22 Spur north
Deuel		48.546	78.127	MN 68 east – Canby	Continuation into Minnesota
1.000 mi = 1.609 km; 1.000 km = 0.621 mi: Concurrency terminus

== Gary spur route ==
Highway 22 Spur
- Location: Gary
- Length: 3.064 mi (4.931 km)
- Existed: 1965-1971–1975

South Dakota Highway 22 Spur (SD 22 Spur) was a spur route of SD 22 that extended from the mainline, at a point south of Gary, and traveled into that city. It was established between 1965 and 1971 and was redesignated as SD 101 in 1975.

== See also ==
- List of state highways in South Dakota
