= Claremont Colony, South Dakota =

- Census-designated place
- Location within South Dakota Location within the United States
- Coordinates: 44°42′42″N 96°57′5″W
- Country: United States
- State: South Dakota
- County: Hamlin

Area
  - Total: 0.30 sq mi (0.78 km^{2})
  - Land: 0.30 sq mi (0.78 km^{2})
  - Water: 0 sq mi (0.00 km^{2})
- Elevation: 1,793 ft (547 m)

Population (2020)
  - Total: 68
  - Density: 225.7/sq mi (87.14/km^{2})
- Time zone: UTC-6 (Central (CST))
  - Summer (DST): UTC-5 (CDT)
- ZIP Code: 57223 (Castlewood)
- Area code: 605
- FIPS code: 46-12148
- GNIS feature ID: 2813027

Claremont Colony is a Hutterite colony and census-designated place (CDP) in Hamlin County, South Dakota, United States. The population was 68 at the 2020 census. It was first listed as a CDP prior to the 2020 census.

It is in the eastern part of the county, 4 miles (6 km) east of Castlewood and 5 miles (8 km) southwest of Exit 164 (South Dakota Highway 22) on Interstate 29.

== Demographics ==
Historical population
Census	Pop.	Note	%±
2020	68		—
U.S. Decennial Census

== Education ==
It is in the Castlewood School District 28-1.
