= Poinsett Colony, South Dakota =

- Census-designated place
- Location within South Dakota Location within the United States
- Coordinates: 44°38′32″N 96°53′57″W
- Country: United States
- State: South Dakota
- County: Hamlin

Area
  - Total: 0.25 sq mi (0.66 km^{2})
  - Land: 0.25 sq mi (0.66 km^{2})
  - Water: 0 sq mi (0.00 km^{2})
- Elevation: 1,802 ft (549 m)

Population (2020)
  - Total: 5
  - Density: 19.5/sq mi (7.53/km^{2})
- Time zone: UTC-6 (Central (CST))
  - Summer (DST): UTC-5 (CDT)
- ZIP Code: 57223 (Castlewood)
- Area code: 605
- FIPS code: 46-51220
- GNIS feature ID: 2813026

Poinsett Colony is a Hutterite colony and census-designated place (CDP) in Hamlin County, South Dakota, United States. The population was 5 at the 2020 census. It was first listed as a CDP prior to the 2020 census.

It is in the southeastern part of the county, 5 miles (8 km) north of Estelline and 12 miles (19 km) southeast of Castlewood.

== Demographics ==
Historical population
Census	Pop.	Note	%±
2020	5		—
U.S. Decennial Census

== Education ==
It is in the Estelline School District 28-2.
