= Jacob and Amelia Tuohino Farm =

- U.S. National Register of Historic Places
- Location within South Dakota Location within the United States
- Nearest city: Lake Norden, South Dakota
- Coordinates: 44°34′29″N 97°18′39″W
- Area: 4 acres (1.6 ha)
- Built: c. 1899
- Built by: Tuohino, Jacob
- MPS: Architecture of Finnish Settlement TR
- NRHP reference No.: 85003495
- Added to NRHP: November 13, 1985

The Jacob and Amelia Tuohino Farm, in Hamlin County, South Dakota, is a historic farm dating from c. 1899 which was listed on the National Register of Historic Places in 1985. It is located 1 mile (1.6 km) south of South Dakota Highway 28, five miles west of Lake Norden.

The listing included eight contributing buildings, four contributing structures and three contributing objects on 4 acres (1.6 ha).

The house is a one-and-a-half-story frame structure on a rock foundation. It has intersecting gable roofs.

The property has various outbuildings including an old barn, a granary, and a sauna which was built c. 1914–15.
