= Watertown micropolitan area, South Dakota =

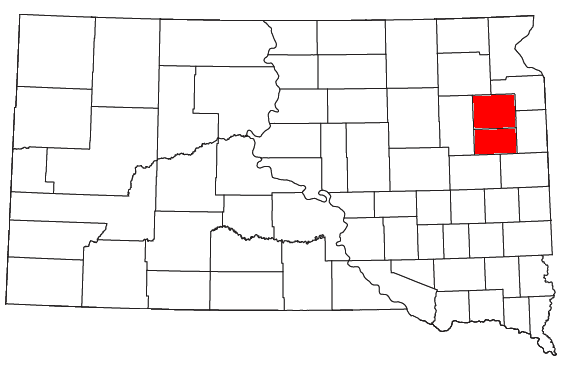
Map of South Dakota highlighting the Watertown Micropolitan Statistical Area.

The Watertown Micropolitan Statistical Area, as defined by the United States Census Bureau, is an area consisting of two counties in South Dakota, anchored by the city of Watertown. As of the 2000 census, the μSA had a population of 31,437 (though a July 1, 2009 estimate placed the population at 31,922).

== Counties ==
- Codington
- Hamlin

== Communities ==
- Places with 20,000 or more inhabitants
  - Watertown (Principal city)
- Places with 500 to 1,000 inhabitants
  - Castlewood
  - Estelline
- Places with 250 to 500 inhabitants
  - Bryant
  - Hayti
  - Henry
  - Florence
  - Lake Norden
  - South Shore
- Places with less than 250 inhabitants
  - Appleby
  - Hazel
  - Kranzburg
  - Rauville
  - Thomas
  - Wallace

== Demographics ==
As of the census of 2000, there were 31,437 people, 12,405 households, and 8,329 families residing within the μSA. The racial makeup of the μSA was 97.05% White, 0.13% African American, 1.26% Native American, 0.26% Asian, 0.01% Pacific Islander, 0.49% from other races, and 0.79% from two or more races. Hispanic or Latino of any race were 0.98% of the population.

The median income for a household in the μSA was $35,054, and the median income for a family was $43,332. Males had a median income of $29,363 versus $20,619 for females. The per capita income for the μSA was $17,872.

== See also ==
- South Dakota census statistical areas
