= South Dakota Central Railway =

The South Dakota Central Railway was a railroad that ran between the cities of Sioux Falls and Watertown. The railroad was organized and operated by local businessmen. Sioux Falls lawyer Joe Kirby served as the railroad's vice president and attorney.

== History ==
Construction of the line began in 1904. The new towns were created along the line are as follows: Crooks, Colton, Huntimer, Chester, Nunda, Sinai, Lyons, Lake Norden, Ahnberg, Rutland, Badger, Thomas, Foley, and Hayti. Frederick Maytag invested in the railroad in 1904. At about the same time he established the Maytag Company which made washing machines.

The railroad suffered chronic financial difficulties. It went into receivership in 1908 and was sold in 1916 in accordance with a bankruptcy court order. It was bought by the Watertown and Sioux Falls Railway, which itself was sold to the Great Northern Railway in December 1928.

Maytag lost money on his railroad investment, and even reimbursed friends who invested in the venture on his advice.
