= Cobb Creek =

Cobb Creek may refer to:

- Cobb Creek (Lac qui Parle River), a stream in Minnesota and South Dakota
- Cobb Creek (Missouri), a stream in Missouri
- Cobb Creek (Oklahoma), a tributary of the Washita River in Washita County, Oklahoma

== See also ==
- Cobbs Creek
