= Charles and Mary Lohr House =

Historic house in South Dakota, United States

- U.S. National Register of Historic Places
- Location within South Dakota Location within the United States
- Location: 1705 State Ave., Estelline, South Dakota
- Coordinates: 44°34′23″N 96°53′37″W
- Area: 4.7 acres (1.9 ha)
- Built: 1901
- Architectural style: Colonial Revival, Queen Anne, Vernacular revival
- NRHP reference No.: 82003927
- Added to NRHP: July 19, 1982

The Charles and Mary Lohr House, at 1705 State Ave. in Estelline, South Dakota, was built in 1901. It was listed on the National Register of Historic Places in 1982.

It was built in 1901 for Charles and Mary Lohr, early settlers in Hamlin County, who had gotten married in 1882. It is now one of the oldest houses of Estelline, and is a blend of Queen Anne, vernacular revival and Colonial Revival styles.
