= Hendrick and Waldur Hendrickson Farm =

- Hendrickson, Hendrick and Waldur, Farm
- U.S. National Register of Historic Places
- Location within South Dakota Location within the United States
- Location: On South Dakota Highway 28, about 2 miles (3.2 km) west of Lake Norden, South Dakota
- Coordinates: 44°35′06″N 97°15′26″W
- Area: 4 acres (1.6 ha)
- Built: 1881
- Built by: Lethola, Henry; Kangas, Erick
- MPS: Architecture of Finnish Settlement TR
- NRHP reference No.: 85003485
- Added to NRHP: November 13, 1985

The Hendrick and Waldur Hendrickson Farm, on South Dakota Highway 28 near Lake Norden, South Dakota, was listed on the National Register of Historic Places in 1985. It has also been known as the Henry Lehtola Farm. the listing included six contributing buildings and a contributing structure.

The house existing in 1985 was the third on the property, built in 1895–1896. Preceding residences where a dugout and a sod house which were demolished. It is a one-and-a-half-story frame hall/parlor plan house.

The farm complex includes a sauna building with an attached chicken coop. This is covered in wood shingles and sits upon a stone foundation. It is 14.5 feet (4.4 m) long, with sauna portion 10.4 feet (3.2 m) wide and the shed addition approximately 12.25 feet (3.73 m) wide.
