= Brantford Township =

Brantford Township may refer to:

- Brantford Township, Ontario, Canada, a former township
- Brantford Township, Washington County, Kansas, Washington County, Kansas, United States
- Brantford Township, Hamlin County, South Dakota, Hamlin County, South Dakota, United States
