= First State Bank of Hazel =

- U.S. National Register of Historic Places
- Location within South Dakota Location within the United States
- Location: Main St. west of its junction with Highway 22, Hazel, South Dakota
- Coordinates: 44°45′33″N 97°22′55″W
- Area: less than one acre
- Built: 1901
- Architectural style: Early Commercial, Classical Revival
- NRHP reference No.: 97000147
- Added to NRHP: February 21, 1997

The First State Bank of Hazel, located on Main St. west of its junction with Highway 22 in Hazel, South Dakota, was built in 1901. It has also been known as Farmers State Bank of Hazel. It was listed on the National Register of Historic Places in 1997.

It is a brick one-story flat-roof Commercial-style building.

It was deemed notable "for its contribution to commerce and economic development in Hazel, South Dakota" and for its architecture, as "a representative example of an early 20th century commercial building." It is in fact the only surviving architecturally intact historic commercial building in Hazel.
