= Hoffelt Drug Store =

- U.S. National Register of Historic Places
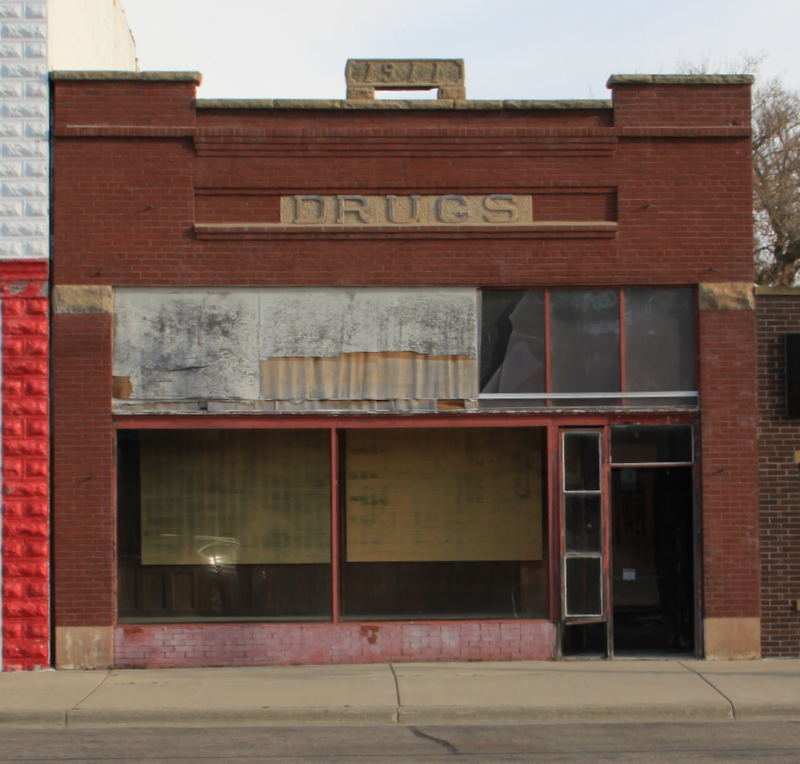

- Location within South Dakota Location within the United States
- Location: 212 Main St., Estelline, South Dakota
- Coordinates: 44°34′35″N 96°54′08″W
- Area: less than one acre
- Built: 1911
- NRHP reference No.: 08000050
- Added to NRHP: February 19, 2008

The Hoffelt Drug Store, located at 212 Main St. in Estelline, South Dakota, was erected in 1911. It was listed on the National Register of Historic Places in 2008.

It is a one-story commercial building with a brick facade with concrete accents.

It was deemed architecturally notable as "an excellent example of a one-part, vernacular commercial block constructed in Hamlin County during the early twentieth century. This building is not only intact, but its contents are intact, with most of the original furnishings, including soda fountain, tables and chairs, light fixtures, cabinets and even pharmaceutical tools, bottles and labels."
