= SD 101 =

SD 101 or SD-101 may refer to:

- South Dakota Highway 101
- SD-101, a TLR9 agonist in clinical trials as an immunotherapy
