= Ahnberg, South Dakota =

Unincorporated community in South Dakota, US

- Unincorporated community
- Location in Brookings County, South Dakota
- Coordinates: 44°18′15″N 97°03′24″W
- Country: United States
- State: South Dakota
- County: Brookings
- Elevation: 1,788 ft (545 m)
- Time zone: UTC-6 (Central (CST))
  - Summer (DST): UTC-5
- GNIS feature ID: 1261088

Ahnberg is an unincorporated community in west-central Brookings County, South Dakota, United States.

== Geography ==
Ahnberg is located approximately five miles north of Sinai and about 12 miles west of Brookings. The community site lies in Bangor Township.

== History ==
Ahnberg developed along the main line of the South Dakota Central Railway, a railroad built in the early 20th century connecting Sioux Falls and Watertown.

The rail line later became part of the Watertown and Sioux Falls Railway, which was acquired by the Great Northern Railway in 1928. After the formation of the Burlington Northern Railroad in 1970, the line continued under that ownership until rail service declined and the track was abandoned and removed in the early 1980s.

The settlement was originally known as Como. When a post office was established on December 7, 1920, the name Ahnberg was selected. The community was named for Oscar Ahnberg, a pioneer farmer living in the surrounding area. Even after the renaming, the locality was sometimes still referred to as Como in historical references.

The Ahnberg post office operated from December 7, 1920, until December 31, 1937, when it was discontinued and postal service was transferred to Arlington.
