= Bemis, South Dakota =

Unincorporated community in South Dakota, U.S.

Coordinates: 44°50′06″N 96°50′54″W

Bemis is an unincorporated community in Deuel County in the northeast corner of the U.S. state of South Dakota.

A post office called Bemis was established in 1905, and remained in operation until 1985. The community has the name of P. W. Bemis, a first settler.
