= Singsaas Lutheran Church =

Historic church in South Dakota, United States

- U.S. National Register of Historic Places
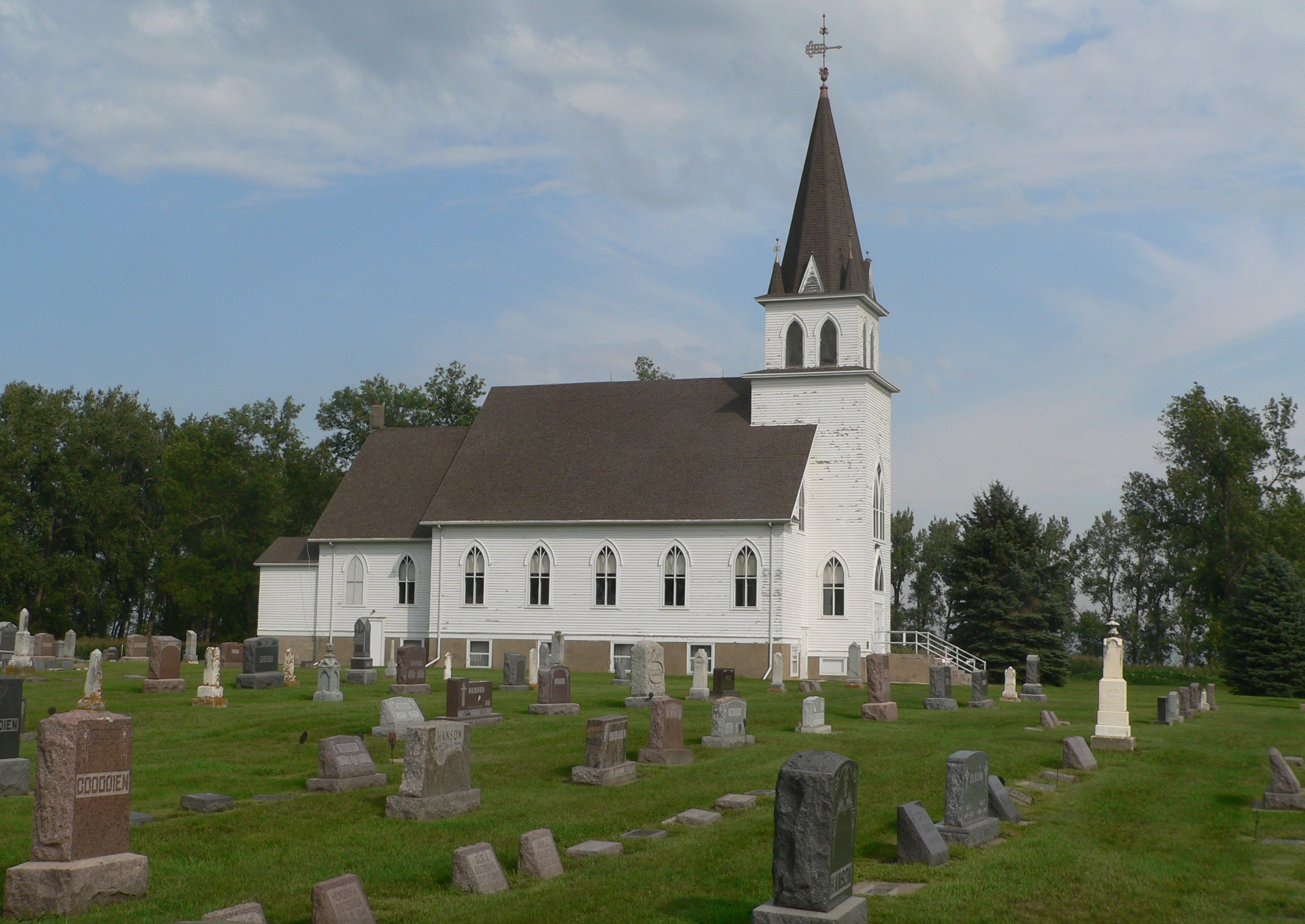

- Location within South Dakota Location within the United States
- Location: 19715 487 Ave
- Nearest city: Hendricks, Minnesota
- Coordinates: 44.526016°N 96.464985°W
- Built: 1921
- Architect: Buseth and Tollefson
- Architectural style: Late Gothic Revival
- NRHP reference No.: 03001070
- Added to NRHP: October 23, 2003

The Singsaas Lutheran Church is a church in rural Brookings County, South Dakota. It is situated 3 miles northwest of the community of Hendricks, Minnesota. It was added to the National Register of Historic Places in 2003.

The church was built in Late Gothic Revival style during 1921. It was named for the district of Singsås in the valley of Gauldalen, in Sør-Trøndelag, Norway, from which many of the original congregation had immigrated.

== See also ==
- Singsås Church
