= Nicholas Egbert Knight =

American politician (1866–1946)

Nicholas Egbert Knight (October 15, 1866 – April 18, 1946) was a member of the South Dakota House of Representatives He was a Republican.

== Biography ==
Knight was born on October 15, 1866, in Eau Claire County, Wisconsin. He was Methodist. He came to Dakota Territory in 1886 and settled in Hamlin County, Dakota Territory. He was a farmer and raised stock. Knight was involved in the farm elevator and telephone businesses. He died on April 18, 1946.

== Career ==
Knight was a member of the House of Representatives from 1913 to 1915 and from 1932 to 1933. He also served as South Dakota Commissioner of School and Public Lands from 1917 to 1925. Knight unsuccessfully ran against Carl Gunderson for the Republican nomination for governor of South Dakota in 1923.
