= Estelline Bandstand and Gazebo Park =

- U.S. National Register of Historic Places
- Location within South Dakota Location within the United States
- Location: 105 N. Main, Estelline, South Dakota
- Coordinates: 44°34′22″N 96°54′09″W
- Area: less than one acre
- Built: 1927
- Built by: Nelson, Dick
- NRHP reference No.: 99001434
- Added to NRHP: November 30, 1999

The Estelline Bandstand and Gazebo Park, at 105 N. Main in Estelline, South Dakota, was listed on the National Register of Historic Places in 1999.

The Estelline Bandstand, now known as the Estelline Gazebo, is within Gazebo Park, and was built in 1927.

It is built of white concrete and beadboard, and has eight octagonal pillars supporting its roof. There are eleven balusters between each of seven pairs of pillars; six steps descend between the last pairing.
