= Hamlin County Courthouse =

- U.S. National Register of Historic Places
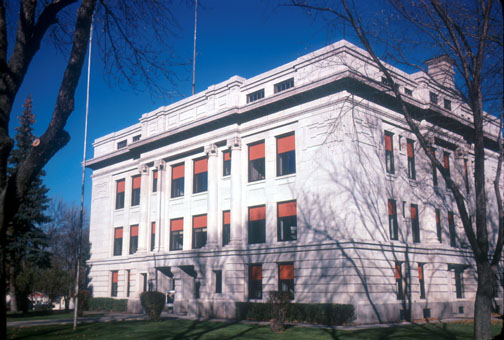
- 1974 photo of the courthouse by Calvin Beale

- Location within South Dakota Location within the United States
- Interactive map showing the location of Hamlin County Courthouse
- Location: 300 4th St., Hayti, South Dakota
- Coordinates: 44°39′25″N 97°12′13″W
- Area: less than one acre
- Built: 1916
- Built by: Gray Construction Co.
- Architect: Rose, Wm. & Peterson, D.B.
- Architectural style: Classical Revival
- MPS: County Courthouses of South Dakota MPS
- NRHP reference No.: 00001225
- Added to NRHP: October 12, 2000

The Hamlin County Courthouse, located at 300 4th Street in Hayti, is the county courthouse serving Hamlin County, South Dakota. The courthouse was completed in 1916, two years after the Hamlin county seat was moved to Hayti from Castlewood by popular vote. Architects William W. Rose and David B. Peterson of Kansas City, Missouri designed the courthouse; their Classical Revival design was typical of contemporary courthouse architecture in South Dakota. The four-story limestone building features four Ionic columns along the front facade and an entablature with an egg-and-dart frieze and a dentillated cornice. The building has served as the seat of county government since its opening.

The courthouse was added to the National Register of Historic Places on October 12, 2000.
