= First National Bank of Norden =

- U.S. National Register of Historic Places
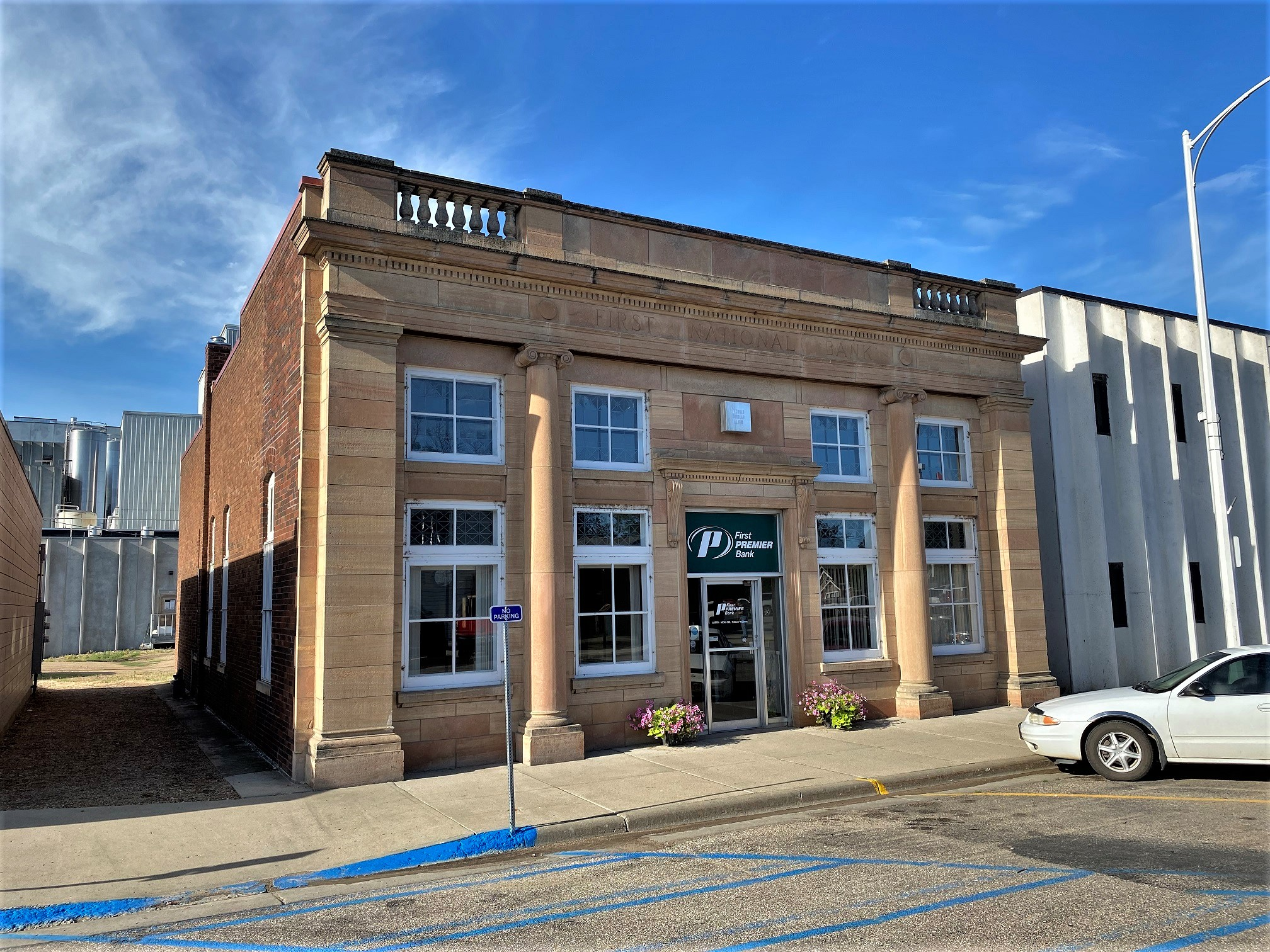

- Location within South Dakota Location within the United States
- Location: 503 Main Av. Lake Norden, South Dakota
- Coordinates: 44°34′56″N 97°12′37″W
- Area: less than one acre
- Built: 1920
- Architect: Louis F. Dow, Co.
- Architectural style: Classical Revival
- NRHP reference No.: 05001189
- Added to NRHP: October 26, 2005

The First National Bank of Norden, at 503 Main Av. in Lake Norden, South Dakota, was built in 1920. It was listed on the National Register of Historic Places in 2005.

It is a one-and-a-half-story brick and reinforced concrete building, on a concrete foundation. It has a pink Kasota limestone facade. It was designed by Louis F. Dow Co. in Classical Revival style. It has also been known as the Farmers State Bank of Norden, asFirst National Bank & Trust Co, as First State Bank, and as First Premier Bank.
