= Kant Hotel =

- U.S. National Register of Historic Places
- Location within South Dakota Location within the United States
- Location: North of Highway 28, Bryant, South Dakota
- Coordinates: 44°35′26″N 97°28′04″W
- Area: less than one acre
- Built: 1912
- Built by: Kant, Theodore Henry
- NRHP reference No.: 85003449
- Added to NRHP: October 31, 1985

The Kant Hotel in Bryant, South Dakota, which has also been known as the Bryant Hotel, was built in 1912. It was listed on the National Register of Historic Places in 1985.

It is a two-story building with cream-colored brick walls. It has a raised parapet with decorative granite corbelling. Two Doric columns flank its central entranceway.

It was built by Theodore Henry Kant (1856–1931), who was born in Posen in Kingdom of Prussia and immigrated to the U.S. in 1881.
