= Old St. Mary's Catholic Parish House =

- U.S. National Register of Historic Places
- Location within South Dakota Location within the United States
- Location: 5th Ave. and Underwood St., Bryant, South Dakota
- Coordinates: 44°35′19″N 97°27′57″W
- Area: less than one acre
- Built: 1908
- Architectural style: American Foursquare
- NRHP reference No.: 88002840
- Added to NRHP: December 27, 1988

The Old St. Mary's Catholic Parish House, located at 5th Ave. and Underwood St. in Bryant, South Dakota, is an American Foursquare-style house built in 1908. It was listed on the National Register of Historic Places in 1988.

It was deemed significant as "an excellent example of the popular vernacular style now commonly called American Foursquare."

Number of contributing buildings: 2
