= Johnsonville, South Dakota =

Unincorporated community in South Dakota, U.S.

Coordinates: 44°50′06″N 96°50′54″W

Johnsonville is an unincorporated community in Deuel County in the northeast corner of the U.S. state of South Dakota.
