= Moritz, South Dakota =

Unincorporated community in South Dakota, U.S.

Coordinates: 44°50′02″N 96°33′40″W

Moritz is an unincorporated community in Deuel County, in the U.S. state of South Dakota.

== History ==
A post office called Moritz was established in 1899, and remained in operation until it was discontinued in 1923. The community was named for Andrew Moritz, an early settler.
