= Dempster, South Dakota =

Unincorporated community in South Dakota, U.S.

Coordinates: 44°37′55″N 96°57′06″W

Dempster is an unincorporated community in Hamlin County, in the U.S. state of South Dakota.

== History ==
Dempster was platted in 1884. It was named for William Dempster, who owned the town site. A post office has been in operation in Dempster since 1884.
