= Hamlin School District 28-3 =

School district in South Dakota, United States

Hamlin School District 28-3 is a school district based in Hamlin County, South Dakota.

In Hamlin County, the district includes Bryant, Hayti, Hazel, Lake Norden, and portions of Lake Poinsett. The district also includes portions of Clark, Codington, and Kingsbury counties.

== History ==
The district began operations in 1972.

In 1978 there was a proposal to divide the district into separate Hayti and Hazel districts. The voters rejected this in a referendum that year.

In 1994, the enrollment count was 650.

== Schools ==
The K-12 education facility is called the Hamlin Education Center. The district is organized into three schools: Hamlin Elementary School, Hamlin Middle School, and Hamlin High School. The facility is 4 miles (6.4 km) west of the Hayti city limits.

The district uses the former Hamlin School, located in the municipal limits of Hayti, for athletic purposes, specifically its American football field and its track field.

== Alumni ==
- Kristi Noem - Hamlin High School class of 1990
