= Tunerville =

Unincorporated community in South Dakota

Tunerville is an unincorporated community in Deuel County, South Dakota, United States.
