= Hendricks, Minnesota =

City in Minnesota, United States

Hendricks
- City
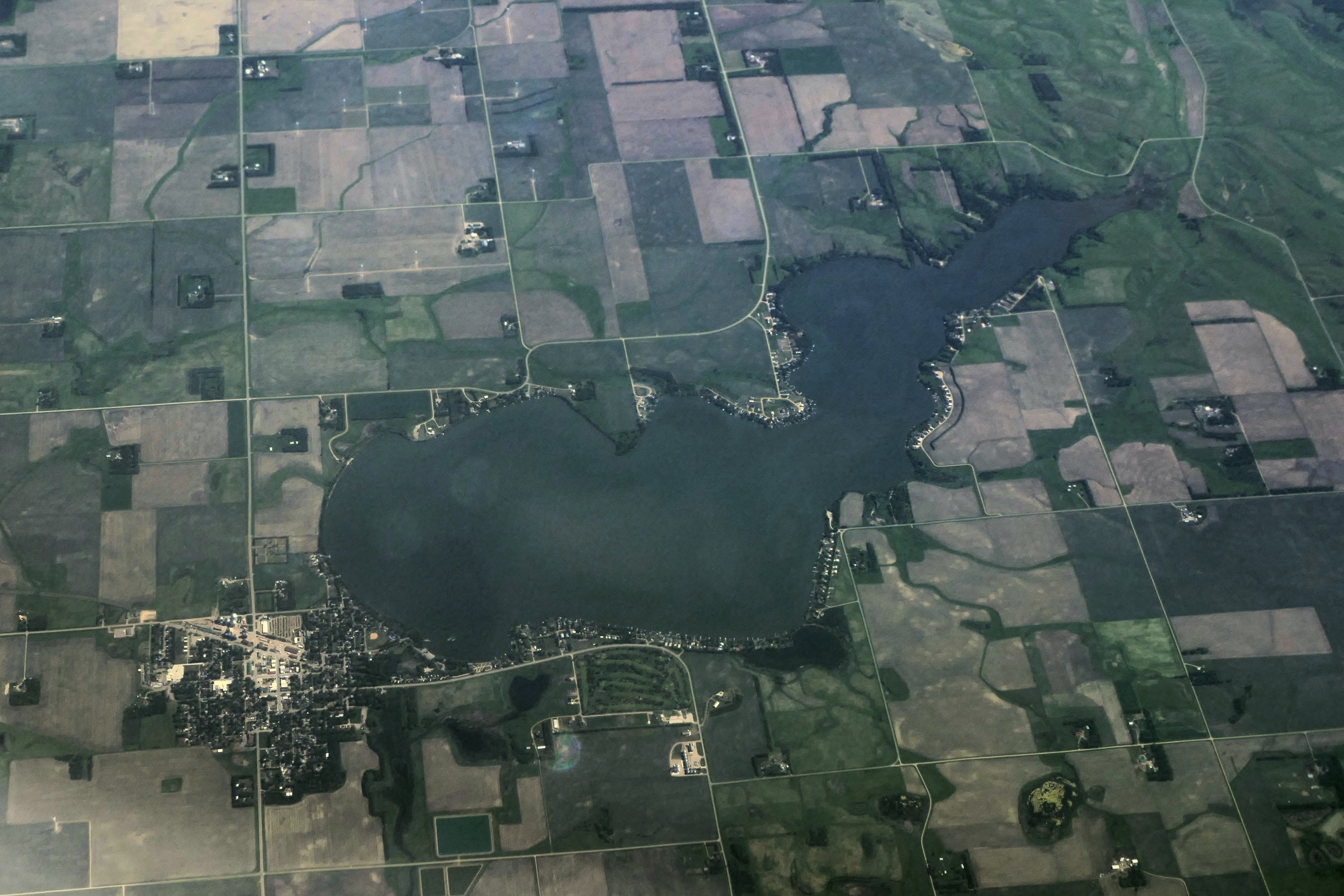
- Aerial view of Hendricks, Minnesota, on Lake Hendricks

- Location of Hendricks within Lincoln County, Minnesota
- Coordinates: 44°30′30″N 96°25′37″W
- Country: United States
- State: Minnesota
- County: Lincoln

Area
  - Total: 0.97 sq mi (2.51 km^{2})
  - Land: 0.97 sq mi (2.51 km^{2})
  - Water: 0 sq mi (0.00 km^{2})
- Elevation: 1,775 ft (541 m)

Population (2020)
  - Total: 616
  - Density: 635.0/sq mi (245.18/km^{2})
- Time zone: UTC-6 (Central (CST))
  - Summer (DST): UTC-5 (CDT)
- ZIP code: 56136
- Area code: 507
- FIPS code: 27-28430
- GNIS feature ID: 2394350
- Website: www.hendricksmn.net

Hendricks is a city in Lincoln County, Minnesota, United States. The population was 616 at the 2020 census.

== History ==
A post office called Hendricks has been in operation since 1884. The city was named for Thomas A. Hendricks, elected 21st Vice President of the United States in 1884.

== Geography ==
According to the United States Census Bureau, the city has a total area of 0.98 square miles (2.54 km^{2}), of which 0.96 square miles (2.49 km^{2}) is land and 0.02 square miles (0.05 km^{2}) is water. The city is located in Sections 17 and 18 of Hendricks Township (T112N R46W), along the northeast shore of Lake Hendricks, the source of the Lac qui Parle River.

Main routes include Minnesota State Highway 271, Division Street, Main Street, Garfield Street, Railroad Street, and Lincoln County Road 17. Minnesota State Highway 19 is nearby.

== Demographics ==
Historical population
Census	Pop.	Note	%±
1910	406		—
1920	731		80.0%
1930	702		−4.0%
1940	740		5.4%
1950	781		5.5%
1960	797		2.0%
1970	712		−10.7%
1980	737		3.5%
1990	684		−7.2%
2000	725		6.0%
2010	713		−1.7%
2020	616		−13.6%
U.S. Decennial Census

=== 2010 census ===
As of the census of 2010, there were 713 people, 326 households, and 185 families residing in the city. The population density was 742.7 inhabitants per square mile (286.8/km^{2}). There were 378 housing units at an average density of 393.8 per square mile (152.0/km^{2}). The racial makeup of the city was 99.3% White, 0.1% African American, 0.3% Native American, and 0.3% from two or more races. Hispanic or Latino of any race were 1.1% of the population.

There were 326 households, of which 19.9% had children under the age of 18 living with them, 45.4% were married couples living together, 8.3% had a female householder with no husband present, 3.1% had a male householder with no wife present, and 43.3% were non-families. 40.2% of all households were made up of individuals, and 24.5% had someone living alone who was 65 years of age or older. The average household size was 2.01 and the average family size was 2.64.

The median age in the city was 53.9 years. 17.3% of residents were under the age of 18; 6.2% were between the ages of 18 and 24; 16.8% were from 25 to 44; 21.6% were from 45 to 64; and 38.1% were 65 years of age or older. The gender makeup of the city was 49.1% male and 50.9% female.

=== 2000 census ===
As of the census of 2000, there were 725 people, 308 households, and 169 families residing in the city. The population density was 753.5 inhabitants per square mile (290.9/km^{2}). There were 360 housing units at an average density of 374.2 per square mile (144.5/km^{2}). The racial makeup of the city was 99.59% White and 0.41% Asian.

There were 308 households, out of which 20.8% had children under the age of 18 living with them, 47.1% were married couples living together, 5.8% had a female householder with no husband present, and 45.1% were non-families. 43.2% of all households were made up of individuals, and 31.8% had someone living alone who was 65 years of age or older. The average household size was 2.07 and the average family size was 2.90.

In the city, the population was spread out, with 20.6% under the age of 18, 2.8% from 18 to 24, 17.5% from 25 to 44, 16.7% from 45 to 64, and 42.5% who were 65 years of age or older. The median age was 57 years. For every 100 females, there were 76.8 males. For every 100 females age 18 and over, there were 72.5 males.

The median income for a household in the city was $26,042, and the median income for a family was $37,813. Males had a median income of $30,875 versus $20,078 for females. The per capita income for the city was $15,828. About 4.1% of families and 8.4% of the population were below the poverty line, including 6.8% of those under age 18 and 12.8% of those age 65 or over.

== Points of interest ==
Hendricks is on the northern edge of the Buffalo Ridge Wind Farm, which is one of the largest in the United States offsetting more than 1 billion pounds of carbon dioxide and 450,000 pounds of coal.

Located 3 miles Northwest of Hendricks is Singsaas Lutheran Church. Established by Norwegian settlers on October 26, 1874; Singsaas Lutheran Church at over 135 years old is on the National Register of Historic Places. This makes it one of the oldest Prairie Churches in the country that still holds weekly services. Every Christmas Singsaas puts out a CD of their annual Christmas program.

There are also many recreational opportunities in Hendricks. It is home to Lake Hendricks, with an attached park. It has a nine-hole golf course in town with a newly constructed club house in 2014, which runs numerous tournaments throughout the golfing season as well as a golf league.

Hendricks is also home to a twenty-five-site campground near Lake Hendricks. They provide water and electric hookups as well as firewood.

In December 2014 the Red Barn Theater was opened, attracting 230 of the 713 people of Hendricks in the opening night. Its first showing was Night at the Museum: Secret of the Tomb. It was the first time since 1972 that Hendricks had a theater.
