= South Dakota Highway 101 =

State highway in South Dakota, United States

Highway 101

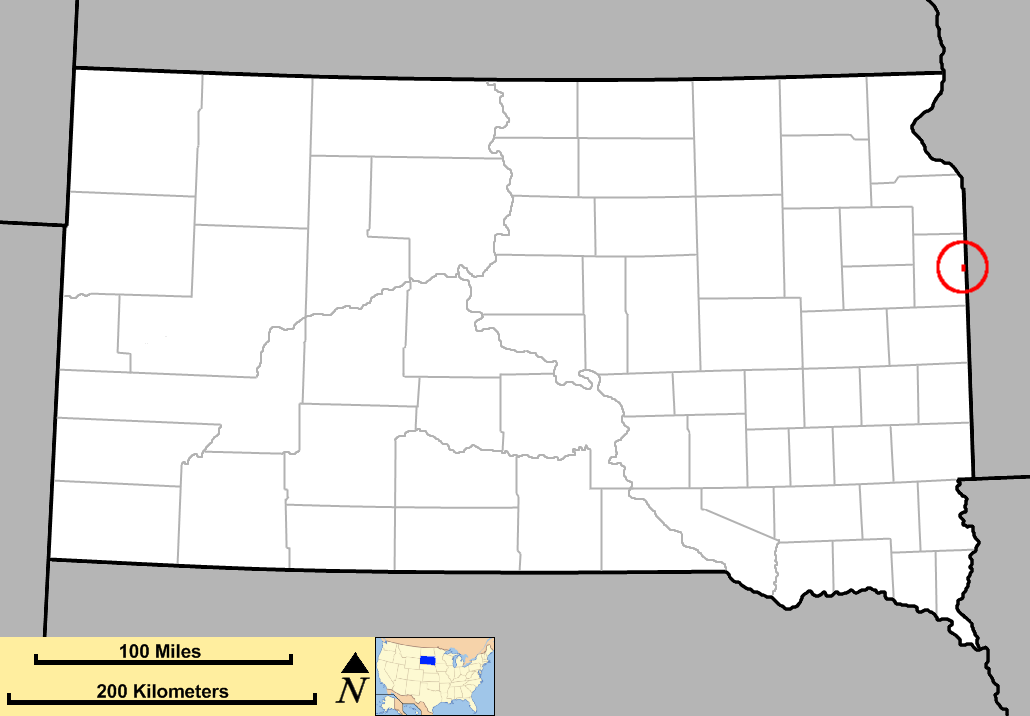
- Route of SD 101 (in red)

Route information
- Maintained by SDDOT
- Length: 3.064 mi (4.931 km)
- Existed: 1975–present

Major junctions
- South end: SD 22 in Herrick Township
- North end: CR 310 in Gary

Location
- Country: United States
- State: South Dakota
- Counties: Deuel

Highway system
- South Dakota State Trunk Highway System; Interstate; US; State
← SD 89	→ SD 106

South Dakota Highway 101 (SD 101) is a short highway linking the town of Gary to State Highway 22. It was commissioned in 1975, and had previously had been a spur of Highway 22.

== Route description ==
South Dakota Highway 101 begins at a junction with South Dakota Highway 22 in Herrick Township. The road travels north paralleling the Minnesota state line, entering the town of Gary, South Dakota as Herrick Street. Highway 101 has intersections with Washington Avenue and Prospect Avenue, and ends at CR 310/Main Avenue in Gary. The speed limit is 65 miles per hour (105 km/h) from Highway 22 to the Gary city limits, and 25 miles per hour (40 km/h) within the city of Gary.

== Major intersections ==
The entire route is in Deuel County.

Location	mi	km	Destinations	Notes
Herrick Township	0.000	0.000	SD 22 – Clear Lake, Canby	Southern terminus
Herrick Township	0.052	0.084	CR 14 east (182nd Street)	
Gary	2.973	4.785	Washington Avenue	
Gary	3.048	4.905	Prospect Avenue	
Gary	3.064	4.931	CR 310 (Main Avenue)	Northern terminus
1.000 mi = 1.609 km; 1.000 km = 0.621 mi
