= Foster Creek (Missouri) =

Stream in the American state of Missouri

Foster Creek is a stream in Cape Girardeau County in the U.S. state of Missouri. It is a tributary of Hubble Creek.

The stream headwaters arise about three quarter mile southeast of the community of Tilsit at 37°19′12″N 89°45′00″W at an elevation of approximately 470 ft (140 m). The stream flows to the southeast for approximately four miles to its confluence with Hubble Creek at 37°17′12″N 89°41′06″W and an elevation of 358 ft (109 m). The confluence is two miles south of Gordonville and 2.5 miles northwest of Dutchtown.

Foster Creek was named after Jacob Foster, a pioneer settler.

== See also ==
- List of rivers of Missouri
