= Foster Creek (Stanley County, South Dakota) =

River in South Dakota, U.S.

Coordinates: 44°44′16″N 101°02′26″W

Foster Creek is a stream in the U.S. state of South Dakota.

Foster Creek has the name of Charles Foster, a local cattleman.

== See also ==
- List of rivers of South Dakota
