= Stray Horse Creek =

Stream in South Dakato, U.S.

Coordinates: 44°41′21″N 97°00′27″W

Stray Horse Creek is a stream in the U.S. state of South Dakota. It was named for an incident when surveyors' horses escaped and were later found alive and well at the creek.

== See also ==
- List of rivers of South Dakota
