= Cobb Creek (Lac qui Parle River tributary) =

Stream in Minnesota and South Dakota, U.S.

Coordinates: 44°44′06″N 96°26′07″W

Cobb Creek is a stream in the U.S. states of Minnesota and South Dakota. It is a tributary of the Lac qui Parle River.

Cobb Creek has the name of M. G. Cobb, a Deuel County civil servant.

== See also ==
- List of rivers of Minnesota
- List of rivers of South Dakota
