= Deuel County, South Dakota =

County in South Dakota, United States

- County
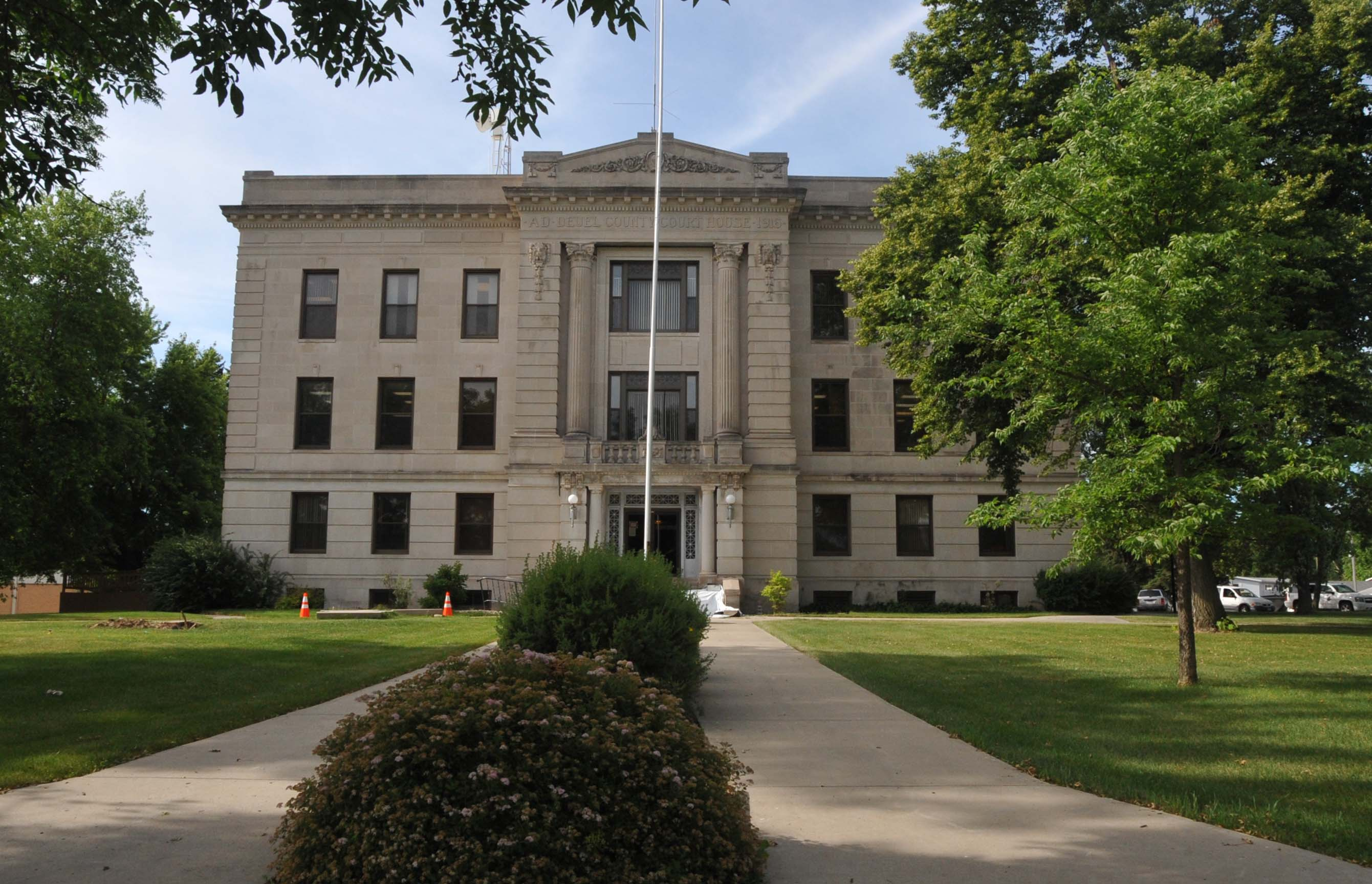
- Deuel County Courthouse

- Location within the U.S. state of South Dakota
- Coordinates: 44°46′N 96°40′W
- Country: United States
- State: South Dakota
- Created: 1862
- Organized: 1878
- Named for: Jacob Deuel
- Seat: Clear Lake
- Largest city: Clear Lake

Area
  - Total: 637 sq mi (1,650 km^{2})
  - Land: 623 sq mi (1,610 km^{2})
  - Water: 14 sq mi (36 km^{2}) 2.2%

Population (2020)
  - Total: 4,295
  - Estimate (2025): 4,408 ▲
  - Density: 6.89/sq mi (2.66/km^{2})
- Time zone: UTC−6 (Central)
  - Summer (DST): UTC−5 (CDT)
- Congressional district: At-large
- Website: deuelcountysd.com

Deuel County (/ˈduːl/ DOOL) is a county in the U.S. state of South Dakota. As of the 2020 census, the population was 4,295. Its county seat is Clear Lake. The county was created in 1862, and was organized in 1878. It is named for Jacob Deuel, a legislator in 1862.

== Geography ==
Soils of Deuel County

Deuel County lies on the east boundary line of South Dakota. Its east boundary line abuts the west boundary line of the state of Minnesota. Its terrain consists of rolling hills, sloped to the northeast. The area is largely devoted to agriculture. The county's highest elevation occurs on its upper west boundary line, at 1,936 ft (590 m) ASL. The county has a total area of 637 square miles (1,650 km^{2}), of which 623 square miles (1,610 km^{2}) is land and 14 square miles (36 km^{2}) (2.2%) is water.

=== Major highways ===
- Interstate 29
- U.S. Highway 212
- South Dakota Highway 15
- South Dakota Highway 22
- South Dakota Highway 28
- South Dakota Highway 101

=== Adjacent counties ===
- Grant County – north
- Lac qui Parle County, Minnesota – northeast
- Yellow Medicine County, Minnesota – east
- Lincoln County, Minnesota – southeast
- Brookings County – south
- Hamlin County – southwest
- Codington County – northwest

=== Lakes ===
- Bullhead Lake
- Briggs Lake
- Clear Lake
- East Coteau Lake
- Fish Lake
- Fox Lake
- Lake Alice
- Lake Cochrane
- Lake Francis
- Lake Ketchum
- Lake Oliver
- Lake Milk
- Lone Tree Lake
- North Coteau Lake
- Round Lake
- Rush Lake
- Salt Lake (part)
- School Lake
- Slough Up’Nort
- South Coteau Lake
- Wigdale Lake

=== Protected areas ===
- Altamont State Public Shooting Area
- Astoria State Wildlife Management Area
- Briggs Lake State Public Shooting Area
- Crystal Springs State Public Shooting Area
- Lake Cochrane State Recreation Area
- Lake Francis State Public Shooting Area
- Lone Tree Lake State Public Shooting Area
- Mitchell State Public Shooting Area
- Mud Lake State Public Shooting Area
- Nelson State Wildlife Management Area
- Rome State Wildlife Management Area
- Round Lake State Wildlife Management Area
- Runge State Wildlife Management Area
- Rush Lake State Public Shooting Area
- Sharp State Public Shooting Area
- Singsaas Slough State Wildlife Management Area
- Sokota State Wildlife Management Area (partial)

== Demographics ==
Historical population
Census	Pop.	Note	%±
1870	37		—
1880	2,302		6,121.6%
1890	4,574		98.7%
1900	6,656		45.5%
1910	7,768		16.7%
1920	8,759		12.8%
1930	8,732		−0.3%
1940	8,450		−3.2%
1950	7,689		−9.0%
1960	6,782		−11.8%
1970	5,686		−16.2%
1980	5,289		−7.0%
1990	4,522		−14.5%
2000	4,498		−0.5%
2010	4,364		−3.0%
2020	4,295		−1.6%
2025 (est.)	4,408	▲	2.6%
U.S. Decennial Census; 1790–1960 1900–1990; 1990–2000 2010–2020

=== 2020 census ===
As of the 2020 census, the county had a population of 4,295 in 1,786 households and 1,177 families. The population density was 6.9 inhabitants per square mile (2.7/km^{2}). Of the residents, 23.9% were under the age of 18 and 21.6% were 65 years of age or older; the median age was 43.9 years. For every 100 females there were 107.6 males, and for every 100 females age 18 and over there were 104.7 males.

The racial makeup of the county was 94.7% White, 0.2% Black or African American, 0.7% American Indian and Alaska Native, 0.0% Asian, 1.7% from some other race, and 2.5% from two or more races. Hispanic or Latino residents of any race comprised 3.2% of the population.

There were 1,786 households in the county, of which 27.2% had children under the age of 18 living with them and 16.7% had a female householder with no spouse or partner present. About 29.0% of all households were made up of individuals and 13.9% had someone living alone who was 65 years of age or older.

There were 2,132 housing units, of which 16.2% were vacant. Among occupied housing units, 79.8% were owner-occupied and 20.2% were renter-occupied. The homeowner vacancy rate was 1.8% and the rental vacancy rate was 10.6%.

=== 2010 census ===
As of the 2010 census, there were 4,364 people, 1,819 households, and 1,228 families in the county. The population density was 7.0 inhabitants per square mile (2.7/km^{2}). There were 2,204 housing units at an average density of 3.5 units per square mile (1.4 units/km^{2}). The racial makeup of the county was 97.5% white, 0.3% American Indian, 0.3% black or African American, 0.1% Asian, 1.0% from other races, and 0.9% from two or more races. Those of Hispanic or Latino origin made up 2.0% of the population. In terms of ancestry, 50.4% were German, 25.4% were Norwegian, 8.0% were Irish, 6.6% were Dutch, 5.5% were English, and 2.9% were American.

Of the 1,819 households, 28.2% had children under the age of 18 living with them, 58.6% were married couples living together, 5.0% had a female householder with no husband present, 32.5% were non-families, and 29.1% of all households were made up of individuals. The average household size was 2.37 and the average family size was 2.92. The median age was 43.9 years.

The median income for a household in the county was $47,000 and the median income for a family was $55,439. Males had a median income of $35,197 versus $26,020 for females. The per capita income for the county was $22,276. About 3.0% of families and 6.1% of the population were below the poverty line, including 5.6% of those under age 18 and 11.9% of those age 65 or over.

== Communities ==
=== Cities ===
- Clear Lake (county seat)
- Gary

=== Towns ===
- Altamont
- Astoria
- Brandt
- Goodwin
- Toronto

=== Unincorporated communities ===
- Bemis
- Johnsonville
- Moritz
- Tunerville

=== Townships ===
- Altamont
- Antelope Valley
- Blom, Brandt
- Clear Lake
- Glenwood
- Goodwin
- Grange
- Havana
- Herrick
- Hidewood
- Lowe
- Norden
- Portland
- Rome
- Scandinavia

== Politics ==
Deuel County is a typical eastern South Dakota county in its political history, which is somewhat akin to the Midwestern states of Iowa and Minnesota. It was strongly Republican in its early years, with no Democrat except William Jennings Bryan gaining forty percent up to 1928. Franklin D. Roosevelt in 1932 became the first Democrat to carry the county, but lost it to Alf Landon in 1936, whilst – like most of the Midwest – the county showed a powerful anti-Roosevelt trend in 1940 and 1944 due to opposition to World War II. From 1964, the county showed a strong trend towards the Democratic Party – so much so that it was one of only 130 counties nationwide to support South Dakota native George McGovern in 1972 against Richard Nixon, and one of only five nationwide to have supported both landslide losers Landon and McGovern. (Note: The others are Middlesex and Norfolk in Massachusetts, Washtenaw County in Michigan, and Jackson County, Illinois.)

Between 1976 and 2010, Deuel was a competitive swing county, voting for the winning candidate in every election until 2008 when Barack Obama lost by 34 votes. Over the past three elections, however, Deuel – in common with many rural counties nationwide – has shown an abrupt swing towards the Republican Party. Donald Trump’s 2016 win was the largest since Dwight D. Eisenhower in 1952.

United States presidential election results for Deuel County, South Dakota
Year	Republican		Democratic		Third party(ies)	
Year	No.	%	No.	%	No.	%
1892	441	43.79%	126	12.51%	440	43.69%
1896	698	50.95%	668	48.76%	4	0.29%
1900	1,052	62.77%	604	36.04%	20	1.19%
1904	1,348	80.33%	279	16.63%	51	3.04%
1908	1,022	64.77%	425	26.93%	131	8.30%
1912	0	0.00%	441	31.17%	974	68.83%
1916	908	59.35%	584	38.17%	38	2.48%
1920	1,569	69.95%	159	7.09%	515	22.96%
1924	1,362	60.32%	168	7.44%	728	32.24%
1928	1,869	64.40%	999	34.42%	34	1.17%
1932	1,131	40.22%	1,658	58.96%	23	0.82%
1936	1,595	50.59%	1,440	45.67%	118	3.74%
1940	2,304	66.40%	1,166	33.60%	0	0.00%
1944	1,910	61.81%	1,180	38.19%	0	0.00%
1948	1,357	49.91%	1,324	48.69%	38	1.40%
1952	2,279	72.17%	879	27.83%	0	0.00%
1956	1,698	55.47%	1,363	44.53%	0	0.00%
1960	1,907	61.92%	1,173	38.08%	0	0.00%
1964	1,317	46.36%	1,524	53.64%	0	0.00%
1968	1,398	53.26%	1,076	40.99%	151	5.75%
1972	1,357	49.60%	1,370	50.07%	9	0.33%
1976	1,177	44.38%	1,465	55.24%	10	0.38%
1980	1,657	60.39%	891	32.47%	196	7.14%
1984	1,537	61.73%	941	37.79%	12	0.48%
1988	1,251	49.49%	1,246	49.29%	31	1.23%
1992	778	32.11%	880	36.32%	765	31.57%
1996	955	40.66%	1,090	46.40%	304	12.94%
2000	1,245	55.98%	926	41.64%	53	2.38%
2004	1,406	58.29%	961	39.84%	45	1.87%
2008	1,088	49.05%	1,054	47.52%	76	3.43%
2012	1,175	54.12%	941	43.34%	55	2.53%
2016	1,366	65.67%	570	27.40%	144	6.92%
2020	1,699	72.30%	609	25.91%	42	1.79%
2024	1,717	74.72%	528	22.98%	53	2.31%

== See also ==
- National Register of Historic Places listings in Deuel County, South Dakota
