= Hendricks Township, Lincoln County, Minnesota =

Hendricks Township, Minnesota
- Township
- Location within the state of Minnesota Hendricks Township, Minnesota (the United States)
- Coordinates: 44°31′N 96°23′W
- Country: United States
- State: Minnesota
- County: Lincoln

Area
  - Total: 36.5 sq mi (94.5 km^{2})
  - Land: 35.1 sq mi (91.0 km^{2})
  - Water: 1.3 sq mi (3.4 km^{2})
- Elevation: 1,770 ft (540 m)

Population (2000)
  - Total: 220
  - Density: 6.2/sq mi (2.4/km^{2})
- Time zone: UTC-6 (Central (CST))
  - Summer (DST): UTC-5 (CDT)
- ZIP code: 56136
- Area code: 507
- FIPS code: 27-28448
- GNIS feature ID: 0664449

Hendricks Township is a township (T112N R46W) in Lincoln County, Minnesota, United States. The population was 220 at the 2000 census.

Hendricks Township took its name from Lake Hendricks.

== Geography ==
According to the United States Census Bureau, the township has a total area of 36.5 square miles (95 km^{2}), of which 35.2 square miles (91 km^{2}) is land and 1.3 square miles (3.4 km^{2}) (3.62%) is water.

== Demographics ==
As of the census of 2000, there were 220 people, 86 households, and 68 families residing in the township. The population density was 6.3 inhabitants per square mile (2.4/km^{2}). There were 124 housing units at an average density of 3.5 per square mile (1.4/km^{2}). The racial makeup of the township was 99.09% White, 0.45% Native American, and 0.45% from two or more races. Hispanic or Latino of any race were 0.45% of the population.

There were 86 households, out of which 27.9% had children under the age of 18 living with them, 75.6% were married couples living together, and 19.8% were non-families. 17.4% of all households were made up of individuals, and 4.7% had someone living alone who was 65 years of age or older. The average household size was 2.56 and the average family size was 2.88.

In the township the population was spread out, with 23.6% under the age of 18, 5.9% from 18 to 24, 26.4% from 25 to 44, 24.5% from 45 to 64, and 19.5% who were 65 years of age or older. The median age was 42 years. For every 100 females, there were 109.5 males. For every 100 females age 18 and over, there were 104.9 males.

The median income for a household in the township was $41,111, and the median income for a family was $42,500. Males had a median income of $24,375 versus $25,000 for females. The per capita income for the township was $14,583. About 7.4% of families and 12.3% of the population were below the poverty line, including 19.2% of those under the age of eighteen and none of those 65 or over.
