= Hayti, South Dakota =

Town in South Dakota, U.S.

- Town
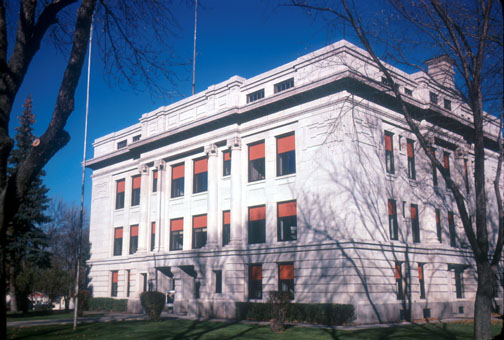
- The Hamlin County Courthouse in Hayti in 1974

- Location in Hamlin County and the state of South Dakota
- Coordinates: 44°39′30″N 97°12′17″W
- Country: United States
- State: South Dakota
- County: Hamlin
- Incorporated: 1914

Area
  - Total: 0.39 sq mi (1.02 km^{2})
  - Land: 0.39 sq mi (1.02 km^{2})
  - Water: 0 sq mi (0.00 km^{2})
- Elevation: 1,696 ft (517 m)

Population (2020)
  - Total: 393
  - Density: 994.0/sq mi (383.79/km^{2})
- Time zone: UTC-6 (Central (CST))
  - Summer (DST): UTC-5 (CDT)
- ZIP code: 57241
- Area code: 605
- FIPS code: 46-27820
- GNIS feature ID: 1267414
- Website: haytisd.com

Hayti (pronounced "HAY-tie") is a town in and the county seat of Hamlin County, South Dakota, United States. The population was 393 at the 2020 census. It is part of the Watertown, South Dakota Micropolitan Statistical Area. It is the county seat of Hamlin County.

According to tradition, the name is derived from the practice of tying bundles of hay to be burned on the prairie, hence the name Hay-tie.

== History ==
Hayti was platted in 1907 when the South Dakota Central Railway was built through the area. The town won an election to become the county seat in 1910, taking the title from Castlewood; however, Castlewood sued to keep the county seat and won the case. In 1914, a second election gave Hayti the county seat for good.

== Geography ==
According to the United States Census Bureau, the town has a total area of 0.31 square miles (0.80 km^{2}), all land.

== Demographics ==
Historical population
Census	Pop.	Note	%±
1920	293		—
1930	344		17.4%
1940	370		7.6%
1950	413		11.6%
1960	425		2.9%
1970	393		−7.5%
1980	371		−5.6%
1990	372		0.3%
2000	367		−1.3%
2010	381		3.8%
2020	393		3.1%
U.S. Decennial Census

=== 2010 census ===
As of the census of 2010, there were 381 people, 152 households, and 102 families residing in the town. The population density was 1,229.0 inhabitants per square mile (474.5/km^{2}). There were 173 housing units at an average density of 558.1 per square mile (215.5/km^{2}). The racial makeup of the town was 96.3% White, 0.8% Native American, and 2.9% from other races. Hispanic or Latino of any race were 3.9% of the population.

There were 152 households, of which 32.2% had children under the age of 18 living with them, 53.9% were married couples living together, 8.6% had a female householder with no husband present, 4.6% had a male householder with no wife present, and 32.9% were non-families. 30.3% of all households were made up of individuals, and 15.1% had someone living alone who was 65 years of age or older. The average household size was 2.51 and the average family size was 3.20.

The median age in the town was 32.9 years. 32% of residents were under the age of 18; 5.5% were between the ages of 18 and 24; 25.2% were from 25 to 44; 22.6% were from 45 to 64; and 14.7% were 65 years of age or older. The gender makeup of the town was 49.6% male and 50.4% female.

=== 2000 census ===
As of the census of 2000, there were 367 people, 157 households, and 105 families residing in the town. The population density was 1,300.6 inhabitants per square mile (502.2/km^{2}). There were 171 housing units at an average density of 606.0 per square mile (234.0/km^{2}). The racial makeup of the town was 98.64% White, 0.82% Native American, and 0.54% from two or more races. 43.3% were of Norwegian, 25.5% German and 13.8% Finnish ancestry according to Census 2000.

There were 157 households, out of which 31.8% had children under the age of 18 living with them, 54.8% were married couples living together, 7.0% had a female householder with no husband present, and 33.1% were non-families. 31.8% of all households were made up of individuals, and 16.6% had someone living alone who was 65 years of age or older. The average household size was 2.34 and the average family size was 2.93.

In the town, the population was spread out, with 27.8% under the age of 18, 10.4% from 18 to 24, 27.0% from 25 to 44, 16.6% from 45 to 64, and 18.3% who were 65 years of age or older. The median age was 35 years. For every 100 females, there were 106.2 males. For every 100 females age 18 and over, there were 99.2 males.

The median income for a household in the town was $39,688, and the median income for a family was $43,958. Males had a median income of $29,583 versus $19,583 for females. The per capita income for the town was $23,169. About 1.9% of families and 5.1% of the population were below the poverty line, including 7.3% of those under age 18 and 7.8% of those age 65 or over.

== Education ==
It is in the Hamlin School District 28-3. The local PK-12 school facility is the Hamlin Education Center, which includes Hamlin Elementary School, Hamlin Middle School, and Hamlin High School, located 4 miles (6.4 km) west of the Hayti city limits. The former Hamlin School, located in the municipal limits of Hayti, is used for athletic purposes, specifically its American football field and its track field.

== Notable people ==
- Garney Henley - Canadian Football Hall of Fame Wide receiver and defensive back, was born here.
- Kristi Noem - The 8th United States Secretary of Homeland Security. She graduated from Hamlin High School, a part of the Hamlin Education Center, the K-12 school facility near Hayti.

== See also ==
- List of towns in South Dakota
