= Foster Creek (James River tributary) =

River in South Dakota, U.S.

Coordinates: 44°33′23″N 98°12′08″W

Foster Creek is a stream in the U.S. state of South Dakota.

Some say Foster Creek has the name of E. W. Foster, an early settler, while others believe the creek has the name of James S. Foster, who was credited with bringing settlers into the area.

== See also ==
- List of rivers of South Dakota
