= Toronto, South Dakota =

- Town
- Location in Deuel County and the state of South Dakota
- Coordinates: 44°34′21″N 96°38′29″W
- Country: United States
- State: South Dakota
- County: Deuel
- Founded: 1884
- Named for: Toronto, Ontario, Canada

Area
  - Total: 0.31 sq mi (0.80 km^{2})
  - Land: 0.31 sq mi (0.80 km^{2})
  - Water: 0 sq mi (0.00 km^{2})
- Elevation: 1,998 ft (609 m)

Population (2020)
  - Total: 196
  - Density: 638.0/sq mi (246.35/km^{2})
- Time zone: UTC-6 (Central (CST))
  - Summer (DST): UTC-5 (CDT)
- ZIP code: 57268
- Area code: 605
- FIPS code: 46-63740
- GNIS feature ID: 1267602
- Website: http://www2.torontosd.com/home

Toronto is a town in Deuel County, South Dakota, United States. The population was 196 at the 2020 census.

Toronto was laid out in 1884, and named after the capital of Ontario, Canada, the native home of a first settler.

== Geography ==
According to the United States Census Bureau, the town has a total area of 0.31 square miles (0.80 km^{2}), all land.

== Demographics ==
Historical population
Census	Pop.	Note	%±
1890	148		—
1900	447		202.0%
1910	424		−5.1%
1920	380		−10.4%
1930	341		−10.3%
1940	362		6.2%
1950	322		−11.0%
1960	268		−16.8%
1970	216		−19.4%
1980	236		9.3%
1990	201		−14.8%
2000	202		0.5%
2010	212		5.0%
2020	196		−7.5%
U.S. Decennial Census

=== 2010 census ===
As of the census of 2010, there were 212 people, 100 households, and 53 families residing in the town. The population density was 683.9 inhabitants per square mile (264.1/km^{2}). There were 115 housing units at an average density of 371.0 per square mile (143.2/km^{2}). The racial makeup of the town was 93.4% White, 3.8% Native American, 1.4% from other races, and 1.4% from two or more races. Hispanic or Latino of any race were 4.2% of the population.

There were 100 households, of which 25.0% had children under the age of 18 living with them, 43.0% were married couples living together, 5.0% had a female householder with no husband present, 5.0% had a male householder with no wife present, and 47.0% were non-families. 40.0% of all households were made up of individuals, and 18% had someone living alone who was 65 years of age or older. The average household size was 2.12 and the average family size was 2.94.

The median age in the town was 40.8 years. 23.1% of residents were under the age of 18; 6.2% were between the ages of 18 and 24; 24.5% were from 25 to 44; 27.3% were from 45 to 64; and 18.9% were 65 years of age or older. The gender makeup of the town was 52.4% male and 47.6% female.

=== 2000 census ===
As of the census of 2000, there were 202 people, 94 households, and 56 families residing in the town. The population density was 657.9 inhabitants per square mile (254.0/km^{2}). There were 113 housing units at an average density of 368.0 per square mile (142.1/km^{2}). The racial makeup of the town was 98.02% White, 0.50% African American, 1.49% from other races.

There were 94 households, out of which 25.5% had children under the age of 18 living with them, 48.9% were married couples living together, 9.6% had a female householder with no husband present, and 40.4% were non-families. 39.4% of all households were made up of individuals, and 20.2% had someone living alone who was 65 years of age or older. The average household size was 2.15 and the average family size was 2.88.

In the town, the population was spread out, with 26.7% under the age of 18, 4.5% from 18 to 24, 24.8% from 25 to 44, 20.3% from 45 to 64, and 23.8% who were 65 years of age or older. The median age was 41 years. For every 100 females there were 88.8 males. For every 100 females age 18 and over, there were 82.7 males.

The median income for a household in the town was $23,750, and the median income for a family was $34,844. Males had a median income of $26,667 versus $26,250 for females. The per capita income for the town was $14,891. About 8.2% of families and 9.4% of the population were below the poverty line, including none of those under the age of eighteen and 16.7% of those 65 or over.

== Notable people ==
- Harold Lovre (1904–1972), U.S. representative from South Dakota
