= Astoria, South Dakota =

- Town
- Location in Deuel County and the state of South Dakota

- Location in South Dakota Astoria (the United States) Astoria (North America)
- Coordinates: 44°33′28″N 96°32′47″W
- Country: United States
- State: South Dakota
- County: Deuel
- Incorporated: 1917

Area
  - Total: 0.16 sq mi (0.41 km^{2})
  - Land: 0.16 sq mi (0.41 km^{2})
  - Water: 0 sq mi (0.00 km^{2})
- Elevation: 1,821 ft (555 m)

Population (2020)
  - Total: 132
  - Density: 840.8/sq mi (324.64/km^{2})
- Time zone: UTC-6 (Central (CST))
  - Summer (DST): UTC-5 (CDT)
- ZIP code: 57213
- Area code: 605
- FIPS code: 46-02580
- GNIS feature ID: 1267272

Astoria is a town in Deuel County, South Dakota, United States. The population was 132 at the 2020 census.

== History ==
Astoria was platted in 1900. The town was named after Astoria, Oregon. A post office has been in operation at Astoria since 1900.

== Geography ==
According to the United States Census Bureau, the town has a total area of 0.16 square miles (0.41 km^{2}), all land.

== Demographics ==
Historical population
| Census | Pop. | Note | %± |
|---|---|---|---|
| 1920 | 221 | | — |
| 1930 | 231 | | 4.5% |
| 1940 | 214 | | −7.4% |
| 1950 | 206 | | −3.7% |
| 1960 | 176 | | −14.6% |
| 1970 | 153 | | −13.1% |
| 1980 | 154 | | 0.7% |
| 1990 | 155 | | 0.6% |
| 2000 | 150 | | −3.2% |
| 2010 | 139 | | −7.3% |
| 2020 | 132 | | −5.0% |
U.S. Decennial Census

=== 2010 census ===
As of the census of 2010, there were 139 people, 61 households, and 32 families residing in the town. The population density was 868.8 inhabitants per square mile (335.4/km^{2}). There were 74 housing units at an average density of 462.5 per square mile (178.6/km^{2}). The racial makeup of the town was 100.0% White.

There were 61 households, of which 27.9% had children under the age of 18 living with them, 45.9% were married couples living together, 1.6% had a female householder with no husband present, 4.9% had a male householder with no wife present, and 47.5% were non-families. 41.0% of all households were made up of individuals, and 9.9% had someone living alone who was 65 years of age or older. The average household size was 2.28 and the average family size was 3.22.

The median age in the town was 41.3 years. 25.2% of residents were under the age of 18; 3.7% were between the ages of 18 and 24; 24.5% were from 25 to 44; 34.4% were from 45 to 64; and 12.2% were 65 years of age or older. The gender makeup of the town was 52.5% male and 47.5% female.

=== 2000 census ===
As of the census of 2000, there were 150 people, 69 households, and 40 families residing in the town. The population density was 952.1 inhabitants per square mile (367.6/km^{2}). There were 75 housing units at an average density of 476.0 per square mile (183.8/km^{2}). The racial makeup of the town was 97.33% White, 1.33% Asian, and 1.33% from two or more races. Hispanic or Latino of any race were 2.00% of the population.

There were 69 households, out of which 24.6% had children under the age of 18 living with them, 42.0% were married couples living together, 13.0% had a female householder with no husband present, and 40.6% were non-families. 39.1% of all households were made up of individuals, and 24.6% had someone living alone who was 65 years of age or older. The average household size was 2.17 and the average family size was 2.93.

In the town, the population was spread out, with 23.3% under the age of 18, 7.3% from 18 to 24, 19.3% from 25 to 44, 22.0% from 45 to 64, and 28.0% who were 65 years of age or older. The median age was 45 years. For every 100 females, there were 92.3 males. For every 100 females age 18 and over, there were 109.1 males.

The median income for a household in the town was $24,375, and the median income for a family was $34,375. Males had a median income of $26,250 versus $18,750 for females. The per capita income for the town was $14,642. There were 17.8% of families and 19.3% of the population living below the poverty line, including 35.9% of under eighteens and 17.9% of those over 64.
