= Hazel, South Dakota =

- Town
- Location in Hamlin County and the state of South Dakota
- Coordinates: 44°45′32″N 97°22′51″W
- Country: United States
- State: South Dakota
- County: Hamlin
- Founded: 1888

Area
  - Total: 0.24 sq mi (0.63 km^{2})
  - Land: 0.24 sq mi (0.63 km^{2})
  - Water: 0 sq mi (0.00 km^{2})
- Elevation: 1,768 ft (539 m)

Population (2020)
  - Total: 102
  - Density: 421.4/sq mi (162.71/km^{2})
- Time zone: UTC-6 (Central (CST))
  - Summer (DST): UTC-5 (CDT)
- ZIP code: 57242
- Area code: 605
- FIPS code: 46-27940
- GNIS feature ID: 1267415

Hazel is a town in Hamlin County, South Dakota, United States. It is part of the Watertown, South Dakota Micropolitan Statistical Area. The population was 102 at the 2020 census.

The town is named for Hazel Bowley, the daughter of the original owner of the town site.

== Geography ==
According to the United States Census Bureau, the town has a total area of 0.24 square miles (0.62 km^{2}), all land.

== Demographics ==
Historical population
Census	Pop.	Note	%±
1910	229		—
1920	247		7.9%
1930	191		−22.7%
1940	182		−4.7%
1950	161		−11.5%
1960	128		−20.5%
1970	101		−21.1%
1980	94		−6.9%
1990	103		9.6%
2000	105		1.9%
2010	91		−13.3%
2020	102		12.1%
U.S. Decennial Census

=== 2010 census ===
As of the census of 2010, there were 91 people, 36 households, and 21 families residing in the town. The population density was 379.2 inhabitants per square mile (146.4/km^{2}). There were 42 housing units at an average density of 175.0 per square mile (67.6/km^{2}). The racial makeup of the town was 97.8% White and 2.2% from two or more races.

There were 36 households, of which 30.6% had children under the age of 18 living with them, 55.6% were married couples living together, 2.8% had a female householder with no husband present, and 41.7% were non-families. Of all households, 30.6% were made up of individuals, and 13.9% had someone living alone who was 65 years of age or older. The average household size was 2.53, and the average family size was 3.43.

The median age in the town was 31.5 years. Of the residents, 31.9% were under the age of 18, 12.1% were between the ages of 18 and 24, 17.6% were from 25 to 44, 17.6% were from 45 to 64, and 20.9% were 65 years of age or older. The gender makeup of the town was 53.8% male and 46.2% female.

=== 2000 census ===
As of the census of 2000, there were 105 people, 41 households, and 30 families residing in the town. The population density was 429.3 inhabitants per square mile (165.8/km^{2}). There were 44 housing units at an average density of 179.9 per square mile (69.5/km^{2}). The racial makeup of the town was 98.10% White and 1.90% Native American. Hispanic or Latino of any race were 0.95% of the population. 34.0% were of American, 34.0% German, 11.3% Norwegian and 5.7% English ancestry according to Census 2000.

There were 41 households, out of which 29.3% had children under the age of 18 living with them, 61.0% were married couples living together, 9.8% had a female householder with no husband present, and 26.8% were non-families. 26.8% of all households were made up of individuals, and 17.1% had someone living alone who was 65 years of age or older. The average household size was 2.56 and the average family size was 3.07.

In the town, the population was spread out, with 29.5% under the age of 18, 8.6% from 18 to 24, 21.9% from 25 to 44, 11.4% from 45 to 64, and 28.6% who were 65 years of age or older. The median age was 36 years. For every 100 females, there were 94.4 males. For every 100 females aged 18 and over, there were 89.7 males.

The median income for a household in the town was $23,000, and the median income for a family was $23,750. Males had a median income of $31,250 versus $16,500 for females. The per capita income for the town was $15,035. There were 16.7% of families and 22.2% of the population living below the poverty line, including 71.4% of under eighteens and none of those over 64.

== Education ==
It is in the Hamlin School District 28-3. The local PK-12 school facility is the Hamlin Education Center, which includes Hamlin Elementary School, Hamlin Middle School, and Hamlin High School, located west of the Hayti city limits.

== Notable people ==
- Warren Green (1869–1945), 13th governor of South Dakota
- Kristi Noem (born 1971), 33rd governor of South Dakota and U.S. secretary of homeland security
