= Thomas, South Dakota =

Unincorporated hamlet in South Dakota, U.S.

Coordinates: 44°45′39″N 97°12′34″W

Thomas is an unincorporated community in Hamlin County in the U.S. state of South Dakota.

== History ==
A post office at Thomas was established in 1910, and remained in operation until 1967. The community has the name of D. C. Thomas, a railroad attorney.
