= Bryant, South Dakota =

- City
- Location in Hamlin County and the state of South Dakota
- Coordinates: 44°35′24″N 97°28′02″W
- Country: United States
- State: South Dakota
- County: Hamlin
- Incorporated: 1912

Government
  - Type: Aldermanic

Area
  - Total: 0.53 sq mi (1.36 km^{2})
  - Land: 0.53 sq mi (1.36 km^{2})
  - Water: 0 sq mi (0.00 km^{2})
- Elevation: 1,850 ft (560 m)

Population (2020)
  - Total: 471
  - Density: 899.3/sq mi (347.24/km^{2})
- Time zone: UTC-6 (Central (CST))
  - Summer (DST): UTC-5 (CDT)
- ZIP code: 57221
- Area code: 605
- FIPS code: 46-08060
- GNIS feature ID: 1267301

Bryant is a city in Hamlin County, South Dakota, United States. It is part of the Watertown, South Dakota Micropolitan Statistical Area. The population was 471 at the 2020 census.

== History ==
Bryant was laid out in 1887, and named for an agent of the town company.

== Geography ==
According to the United States Census Bureau, the city has a total area of 0.52 square miles (1.35 km^{2}), all land.

The city of Bryant was founded in 1886.

== Demographics ==
Historical population
Census	Pop.	Note	%±
1890	172		—
1900	405		135.5%
1910	645		59.3%
1920	651		0.9%
1930	656		0.8%
1940	658		0.3%
1950	624		−5.2%
1960	522		−16.3%
1970	502		−3.8%
1980	388		−22.7%
1990	374		−3.6%
2000	396		5.9%
2010	456		15.2%
2020	471		3.3%
U.S. Decennial Census

=== 2020 census ===
As of the 2020 census, Bryant had a population of 471; the median age was 24.7 years, with 37.8% of residents under the age of 18 and 14.0% 65 years of age or older. For every 100 females there were 105.7 males, and for every 100 females age 18 and over there were 103.5 males age 18 and over.

0.0% of residents lived in urban areas, while 100.0% lived in rural areas.

There were 165 households in Bryant, of which 33.9% had children under the age of 18 living in them. Of all households, 55.2% were married-couple households, 23.6% were households with a male householder and no spouse or partner present, and 18.8% were households with a female householder and no spouse or partner present. About 30.9% of all households were made up of individuals and 14.6% had someone living alone who was 65 years of age or older.

There were 192 housing units, of which 14.1% were vacant. The homeowner vacancy rate was 2.7% and the rental vacancy rate was 8.1%.

Racial composition as of the 2020 census
Race	Number	Percent
White	442	93.8%
Black or African American	2	0.4%
American Indian and Alaska Native	0	0.0%
Asian	0	0.0%
Native Hawaiian and Other Pacific Islander	0	0.0%
Some other race	9	1.9%
Two or more races	18	3.8%
Hispanic or Latino (of any race)	15	3.2%

=== 2010 census ===
At the 2010 census there were 456 people in 167 households, including 106 families, in the city. The population density was 876.9 inhabitants per square mile (338.6/km^{2}). There were 196 housing units at an average density of 376.9 per square mile (145.5/km^{2}). The racial makup of the city was 99.6% White and 0.4% from other races. Hispanic or Latino of any race were 0.4%.

Of the 167 households 29.3% had children under the age of 18 living with them, 52.7% were married couples living together, 7.2% had a female householder with no husband present, 3.6% had a male householder with no wife present, and 36.5% were non-families. 34.1% of households were one person and 22.8% were one person aged 65 or older. The average household size was 2.51 and the average family size was 3.28.

The median age was 34.7 years. 30% of residents were under the age of 18; 7.3% were between the ages of 18 and 24; 19.1% were from 25 to 44; 19.1% were from 45 to 64; and 24.6% were 65 or older. The gender makeup of the city was 48.9% male and 51.1% female.

=== 2000 census ===
At the 2000 census there were 396 people in 172 households, including 94 families, in the city. The population density was 749.7 inhabitants per square mile (289.5/km^{2}). There were 204 housing units at an average density of 386.2 per square mile (149.1/km^{2}). The racial makup of the city was 99.75% White, and 0.25% African American. 23.5% were of German, 21.3% Norwegian, 16.8% American, 12.8% Finnish, 7.9% Irish and 5.2% English ancestry according to Census 2000. Of the 172 households 26.7% had children under the age of 18 living with them, 47.1% were married couples living together, 6.4% had a female householder with no husband present, and 44.8% were non-families. 41.3% of households were one person and 27.3% were one person aged 65 or older. The average household size was 2.30 and the average family size was 3.24.

The age distribution was 27.5% under the age of 18, 9.1% from 18 to 24, 21.7% from 25 to 44, 15.4% from 45 to 64, and 26.3% 65 or older. The median age was 40 years. For every 100 females, there were 91.3 males. For every 100 females age 18 and over, there were 88.8 males.

The median household income was $21,719 and the median family income was $33,393. Males had a median income of $25,208 versus $21,250 for females. The per capita income for the city was $13,989. About 5.7% of families and 9.4% of the population were below the poverty line, including 8.8% of those under age 18 and 8.7% of those age 65 or over.

== Education ==
It is in the Hamlin School District 28-3. The local PK-12 school facility is the Hamlin Education Center, which includes Hamlin Elementary School, Hamlin Middle School, and Hamlin High School, located west of the Hayti city limits.
