= Estelline, South Dakota =

- City
- Location in Hamlin County and the state of South Dakota
- Coordinates: 44°34′36″N 96°54′04″W
- Country: United States
- State: South Dakota
- County: Hamlin
- Incorporated: 1920

Area
  - Total: 0.95 sq mi (2.45 km^{2})
  - Land: 0.95 sq mi (2.45 km^{2})
  - Water: 0 sq mi (0.00 km^{2})
- Elevation: 1,660 ft (510 m)

Population (2020)
  - Total: 749
  - Density: 792.2/sq mi (305.87/km^{2})
- Time zone: UTC-6 (Central (CST))
  - Summer (DST): UTC-5 (CDT)
- ZIP code: 57234
- Area code: 605
- FIPS code: 46-19980
- GNIS feature ID: 1267382
- Website: www.estellinesd.com

Estelline is a city in Hamlin County, South Dakota, United States. It is part of the Watertown, South Dakota Micropolitan Statistical Area. The population was 749 at the 2020 census.

== History ==
A post office was first established at Estelline in 1879. Estelline was platted in 1882. The city was named for a local farmer's daughter.

== Geography ==
According to the United States Census Bureau, the city has a total area of 0.95 square miles (2.46 km^{2}), all of it land.

== Demographics ==
Historical population
| Census | Pop. | Note | %± |
|---|---|---|---|
| 1890 | 210 | | — |
| 1900 | 357 | | 70.0% |
| 1910 | 509 | | 42.6% |
| 1920 | 658 | | 29.3% |
| 1930 | 488 | | −25.8% |
| 1940 | 627 | | 28.5% |
| 1950 | 760 | | 21.2% |
| 1960 | 722 | | −5.0% |
| 1970 | 624 | | −13.6% |
| 1980 | 719 | | 15.2% |
| 1990 | 658 | | −8.5% |
| 2000 | 675 | | 2.6% |
| 2010 | 768 | | 13.8% |
| 2020 | 749 | | −2.5% |
U.S. Decennial Census

=== 2020 census ===
As of the 2020 census, Estelline had a population of 749. The median age was 39.1 years. 26.7% of residents were under the age of 18 and 22.4% of residents were 65 years of age or older. For every 100 females there were 95.6 males, and for every 100 females age 18 and over there were 93.3 males age 18 and over.

0.0% of residents lived in urban areas, while 100.0% lived in rural areas.

There were 291 households in Estelline, of which 33.3% had children under the age of 18 living in them. Of all households, 42.3% were married-couple households, 25.1% were households with a male householder and no spouse or partner present, and 22.7% were households with a female householder and no spouse or partner present. About 33.0% of all households were made up of individuals and 14.1% had someone living alone who was 65 years of age or older.

There were 314 housing units, of which 7.3% were vacant. The homeowner vacancy rate was 3.3% and the rental vacancy rate was 9.4%.

Racial composition as of the 2020 census
| Race | Number | Percent |
|---|---|---|
| White | 647 | 86.4% |
| Black or African American | 1 | 0.1% |
| American Indian and Alaska Native | 5 | 0.7% |
| Asian | 5 | 0.7% |
| Native Hawaiian and Other Pacific Islander | 1 | 0.1% |
| Some other race | 60 | 8.0% |
| Two or more races | 30 | 4.0% |
| Hispanic or Latino (of any race) | 99 | 13.2% |

=== 2010 census ===
At the 2010 census there were 768 people in 297 households, including 189 families, in the city. The population density was 808.4 inhabitants per square mile (312.1/km^{2}). There were 321 housing units at an average density of 337.9 per square mile (130.5/km^{2}). The racial makup of the city was 93.1% White, 0.7% Native American, 5.2% from other races, and 1.0% from two or more races. Hispanic or Latino of any race were 6.3%.

Of the 297 households 30.0% had children under the age of 18 living with them, 47.5% were married couples living together, 9.1% had a female householder with no husband present, 7.1% had a male householder with no wife present, and 36.4% were non-families. 31.3% of households were one person and 15.8% were one person aged 65 or older. The average household size was 2.40 and the average family size was 2.98.

The median age was 40.9 years. 25.8% of residents were under the age of 18; 6.6% were between the ages of 18 and 24; 21.7% were from 25 to 44; 19% were from 45 to 64; and 26.8% were 65 or older. The gender makeup of the city was 47.3% male and 52.7% female.

=== 2000 census ===
At the 2000 census there were 675 people in 290 households, including 173 families, in the city. The population density was 703.8 inhabitants per square mile (271.7/km^{2}). There were 311 housing units at an average density of 324.3 per square mile (125.2/km^{2}). The racial makup of the city was 98.67% White, 0.74% Native American, 0.15% Asian, and 0.44% from two or more races. Hispanic or Latino of any race were 1.48%. 32.1% were of German, 22.0% Norwegian, 8.7% Irish, 6.8% American and 5.3% Dutch ancestry according to Census 2000.

Of the 290 households 24.1% had children under the age of 18 living with them, 53.8% were married couples living together, 3.8% had a female householder with no husband present, and 40.3% were non-families. 37.2% of households were one person and 21.4% were one person aged 65 or older. The average household size was 2.13 and the average family size was 2.82.

The age distribution was 21.2% under the age of 18, 3.9% from 18 to 24, 22.1% from 25 to 44, 18.5% from 45 to 64, and 34.4% 65 or older. The median age was 48 years. For every 100 females, there were 91.8 males. For every 100 females age 18 and over, there were 84.7 males.

The median household income was $27,679 and the median family income was $36,250. Males had a median income of $28,393 versus $22,222 for females. The per capita income for the city was $14,967. About 4.4% of families and 12.7% of the population were below the poverty line, including 9.7% of those under age 18 and 22.2% of those age 65 or over.

== Education ==
It is in the Estelline School District 28-2.
