= Hamlin County, South Dakota =

County in South Dakota, United States

- County
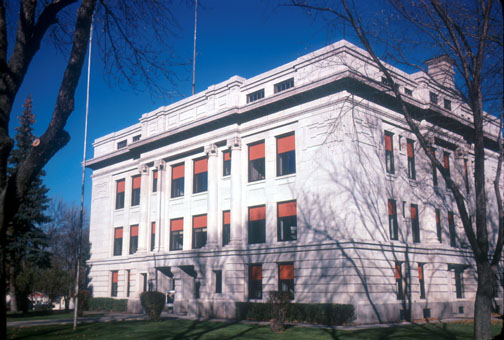
- Hamlin County Courthouse in Hayti in 1974

- Location within the U.S. state of South Dakota
- Coordinates: 44°41′N 97°12′W
- Country: United States
- State: South Dakota
- Created: 1873
- Organized: 1878
- Named for: Hannibal Hamlin
- Seat: Hayti
- Largest city: Estelline

Area
  - Total: 538 sq mi (1,390 km^{2})
  - Land: 507 sq mi (1,310 km^{2})
  - Water: 31 sq mi (80 km^{2}) 5.7%

Population (2020)
  - Total: 6,164
  - Estimate (2025): 6,900 ▲
  - Density: 13.6/sq mi (5.3/km^{2})
- Time zone: UTC−6 (Central)
  - Summer (DST): UTC−5 (CDT)
- Congressional district: At-large
- Website: hamlinco.us

Hamlin County is a county in the U.S. state of South Dakota. As of the 2020 census, the population was 6,164. Its county seat is Hayti. The county was created in 1873 and organized in 1878. It was named for Hannibal Hamlin, Lincoln's first vice-president.

== Geography ==
Soils of Hamlin County

The terrain of Hamlin County consists of low rolling hills, dotted with small lakes and ponds. The land is largely dedicated to agriculture. The terrain slopes to the south-southeast, and its highest point is on the eastern boundary line, near its NE corner, at 1,949 ft (594 m) ASL.

Hamlin County has a total area of 538 square miles (1,390 km^{2}), of which 507 square miles (1,310 km^{2}) is land and 31 square miles (80 km^{2}) (5.7%) is water.

=== Major highways ===
- Interstate 29
- U.S. Highway 81
- South Dakota Highway 21
- South Dakota Highway 22
- South Dakota Highway 28

=== Adjacent counties ===
- Codington County – north
- Deuel County – east
- Brookings County – southeast
- Kingsbury County – southwest
- Clark County – west

=== Protected areas ===
- Baxter Slough State Public Shooting Area
- Bochek State Public Shooting Area
- Eidsness State Public Shooting Area
- Hamlin State Public Shooting Area
- Harju State Public Shooting Area
- Hayes Slough State Public Shooting Area
- Johnsons Slough State Public Shooting Area
- McShane State Public Shooting Area
- Opdahl Slough State Public Shooting Area
- Rasmussen State Public Shooting Area

=== Lakes ===
- Clear Lake
- Dry Lake
- Lake Albert (partial)
- Lake Marsh
- Lake Mary
- Lake Norden
- Lake Poinsett
- Lake Saint John

== Demographics ==
Historical population
Census	Pop.	Note	%±
1880	693		—
1890	4,623		567.1%
1900	5,945		28.6%
1910	7,475		25.7%
1920	8,054		7.7%
1930	8,299		3.0%
1940	7,562		−8.9%
1950	7,058		−6.7%
1960	6,303		−10.7%
1970	5,172		−17.9%
1980	5,261		1.7%
1990	4,974		−5.5%
2000	5,540		11.4%
2010	5,903		6.6%
2020	6,164		4.4%
2025 (est.)	6,900	▲	11.9%
U.S. Decennial Census

=== 2020 census ===
As of the 2020 census, there were 6,164 people, 2,155 households, and 1,513 families residing in the county, and the population density was 12.2 inhabitants per square mile (4.7/km^{2}).

Of the residents, 32.3% were under the age of 18 and 17.8% were 65 years of age or older; the median age was 35.1 years. For every 100 females there were 104.1 males, and for every 100 females age 18 and over there were 102.2 males.

The racial makeup of the county was 92.9% White, 0.1% Black or African American, 0.8% American Indian and Alaska Native, 0.2% Asian, 3.0% from some other race, and 2.9% from two or more races. Hispanic or Latino residents of any race comprised 4.7% of the population.

There were 2,155 households in the county, of which 34.4% had children under the age of 18 living with them and 16.9% had a female householder with no spouse or partner present. About 25.0% of all households were made up of individuals and 12.1% had someone living alone who was 65 years of age or older.

There were 2,759 housing units, of which 21.9% were vacant. Among occupied housing units, 82.0% were owner-occupied and 18.0% were renter-occupied. The homeowner vacancy rate was 1.6% and the rental vacancy rate was 8.5%.

=== 2010 census ===
As of the 2010 census, there were 5,903 people, 2,108 households, and 1,483 families in the county. The population density was 11.6 inhabitants per square mile (4.5/km^{2}). There were 2,760 housing units at an average density of 5.4 units per square mile (2.1 units/km^{2}). The racial makeup of the county was 96.7% white, 0.3% American Indian, 0.2% black or African American, 0.2% Asian, 1.8% from other races, and 0.8% from two or more races. Those of Hispanic or Latino origin made up 2.5% of the population. In terms of ancestry, 42.3% were German, 24.0% were Norwegian, 7.0% were English, 6.1% were Irish, 5.4% were Dutch, and 5.3% were American.

Of the 2,108 households, 33.2% had children under the age of 18 living with them, 61.4% were married couples living together, 5.6% had a female householder with no husband present, 29.6% were non-families, and 25.6% of all households were made up of individuals. The average household size was 2.68 and the average family size was 3.28. The median age was 36.8 years.

The median income for a household in the county was $44,439 and the median income for a family was $54,483. Males had a median income of $36,921 versus $24,645 for females. The per capita income for the county was $21,558. About 4.9% of families and 7.5% of the population were below the poverty line, including 11.5% of those under age 18 and 7.9% of those age 65 or over.

== Communities ==
=== Cities ===
- Bryant
- Castlewood
- Estelline
- Lake Norden

=== Towns ===
- Hayti (county seat)
- Hazel

=== Census-designated place ===
- Claremont Colony
- Lake Poinsett (part)
- Poinsett Colony

=== Unincorporated communities ===
- Baxter Slough
- Dempster
- Thomas

=== Townships ===
- Brantford
- Castlewood
- Cleveland
- Dempster
- Dixon
- Estelline
- Florence
- Garfield
- Hamlin
- Hayti
- Norden
- Opdahl
- Oxford

== Politics ==
Hamlin County voters have usually voted Republican. In only one national election since 1932 has the county selected the Democratic Party candidate.

United States presidential election results for Hamlin County, South Dakota
Year	Republican		Democratic		Third party(ies)	
Year	No.	%	No.	%	No.	%
1892	537	50.80%	161	15.23%	359	33.96%
1896	702	55.10%	559	43.88%	13	1.02%
1900	928	62.79%	509	34.44%	41	2.77%
1904	1,197	75.76%	307	19.43%	76	4.81%
1908	1,095	68.57%	434	27.18%	68	4.26%
1912	0	0.00%	474	29.92%	1,110	70.08%
1916	1,039	57.82%	692	38.51%	66	3.67%
1920	1,322	63.68%	337	16.23%	417	20.09%
1924	1,144	52.38%	207	9.48%	833	38.14%
1928	1,959	63.19%	1,088	35.10%	53	1.71%
1932	1,267	39.23%	1,920	59.44%	43	1.33%
1936	1,857	52.25%	1,622	45.64%	75	2.11%
1940	2,279	64.00%	1,282	36.00%	0	0.00%
1944	1,811	63.97%	1,020	36.03%	0	0.00%
1948	1,608	53.98%	1,326	44.51%	45	1.51%
1952	2,391	71.48%	954	28.52%	0	0.00%
1956	2,083	61.68%	1,294	38.32%	0	0.00%
1960	2,139	63.49%	1,230	36.51%	0	0.00%
1964	1,525	49.42%	1,561	50.58%	0	0.00%
1968	1,649	56.36%	1,149	39.27%	128	4.37%
1972	1,693	56.85%	1,276	42.85%	9	0.30%
1976	1,452	50.66%	1,402	48.92%	12	0.42%
1980	1,885	62.69%	903	30.03%	219	7.28%
1984	1,782	64.54%	963	34.88%	16	0.58%
1988	1,380	52.06%	1,258	47.45%	13	0.49%
1992	1,133	41.35%	826	30.15%	781	28.50%
1996	1,352	49.02%	1,101	39.92%	305	11.06%
2000	1,731	63.57%	923	33.90%	69	2.53%
2004	1,946	64.63%	1,015	33.71%	50	1.66%
2008	1,661	59.60%	1,043	37.42%	83	2.98%
2012	1,803	64.55%	921	32.98%	69	2.47%
2016	2,051	74.26%	555	20.09%	156	5.65%
2020	2,372	76.94%	647	20.99%	64	2.08%
2024	2,560	79.36%	610	18.91%	56	1.74%

== Education ==
School districts include:

- Arlington School District 38-1
- Castlewood School District 28-1
- Deuel School District 19-4
- Estelline School District 28-2
- Hamlin School District 28-3
- Henry School District 14-2
- Watertown School District 14-4
- Waverly School District 14-5

== Notable people ==
- Nicholas Egbert Knight (1866–1946), politician
- Kristi Noem, Governor of South Dakota

== See also ==
- National Register of Historic Places listings in Hamlin County, South Dakota
