= Castlewood, South Dakota =

- City
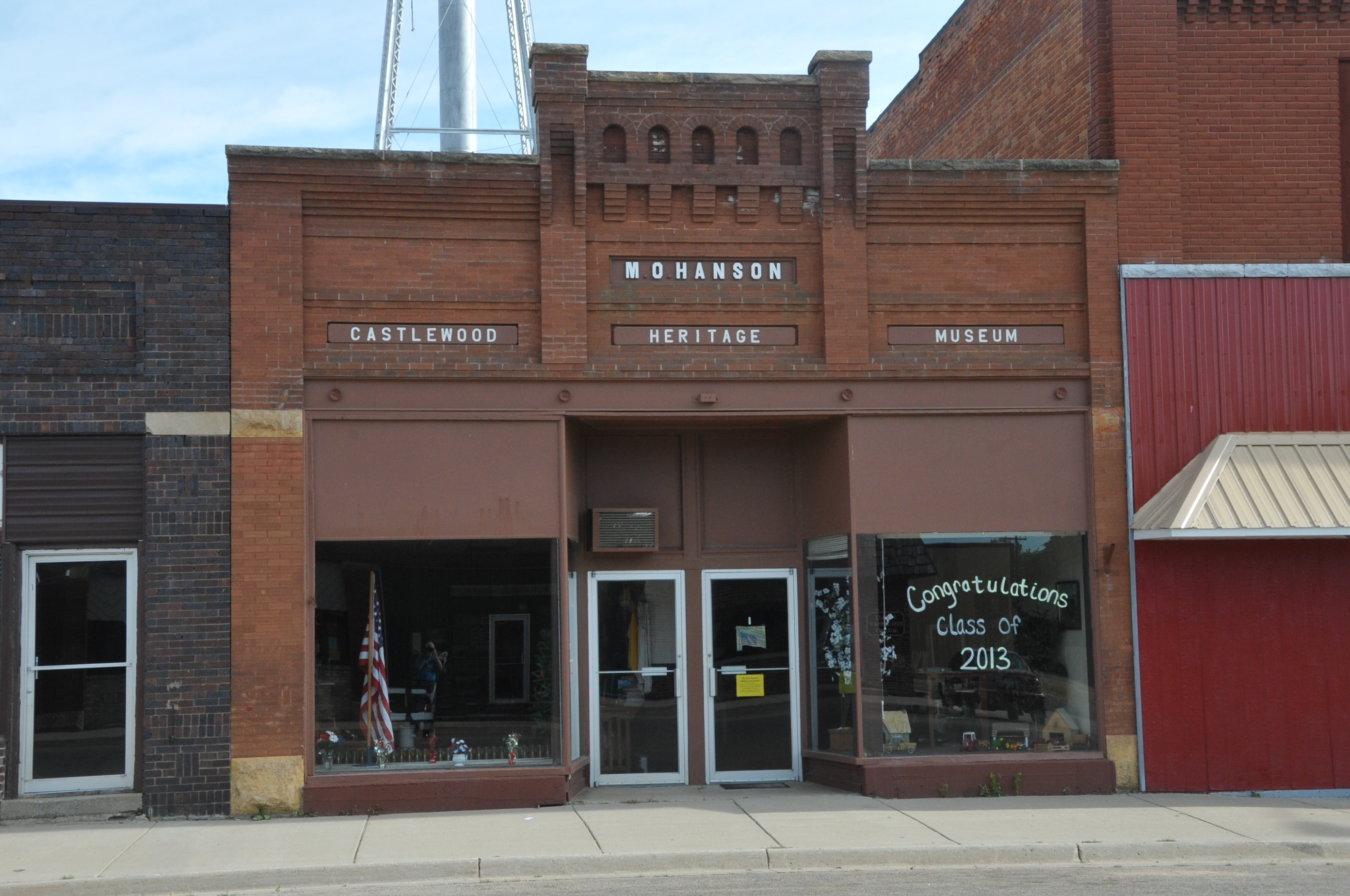
- The M. O. Hanson Building in Castlewood, July 2013
- Motto: "A Small Town With A Big Heart"
- Location in Hamlin County and the state of South Dakota
- Coordinates: 44°43′27″N 97°01′51″W
- Country: United States
- State: South Dakota
- County: Hamlin
- Founded: 1881

Government
  - Mayor: Brian Ries

Area
  - City: 1.15 sq mi (2.98 km^{2})
  - Land: 1.15 sq mi (2.98 km^{2})
  - Water: 0 sq mi (0.00 km^{2})
- Elevation: 1,686 ft (514 m)

Population (2020)
  - City: 698
  - Estimate (2022): 707
  - Density: 615/sq mi (237.3/km^{2})
  - Metro: 35,073
- Time zone: UTC–6 (Central (CST))
  - Summer (DST): UTC–5 (CDT)
- ZIP Code: 57223
- Area code: 605
- FIPS code: 46-10500
- GNIS feature ID: 1267313
- Sales tax: 6.2%
- Website: castlewood.sdcity.gov

Castlewood is a city in Hamlin County, South Dakota, United States. It is part of the Watertown, South Dakota Micropolitan Statistical Area. The population was 698 at the 2020 census, and was estimated to be 707 in 2022.

== History ==
Castlewood was platted in 1881 when the railroad was extended to that point. The city was named Castlewood after a place mentioned in the 1857 novel The Virginians by William Makepeace Thackeray. A post office has been in operation in Castlewood since September 27, 1882.

A destructive EF2 tornado hit the town on May 12, 2022, destroying several structures, damaging homes, and injuring one person.

== Geography ==
Castlewood is located along the Big Sioux River.

According to the United States Census Bureau, the city has a total area of 1.15 square miles (2.98 km^{2}), all land.

=== Climate ===
Castlewood has a dry-winter humid continental climate (Köppen Dwb), with four distinct seasons and a high seasonal temperature variation. The winters are long and harsh, with an annual average extreme minimum temperature of -28.1 °F (-33.4 °C), placing it within the 4a USDA Hardiness Zone (-30°F to -25°F) or (-34.4°C to -31.7°C). Summers are warm, with an average temperature of 69.4 °F (20.8 °C) in July, and experience a high level of precipitation compared to the dry winters.

Climate data for Castlewood, South Dakota, 1991–2020 normals, 1893-2023 extremes: 1685ft (514m)
Month	Jan	Feb	Mar	Apr	May	Jun	Jul	Aug	Sep	Oct	Nov	Dec	Year
Record high °F (°C)	65 (18)	67 (19)	84 (29)	97 (36)	106 (41)	108 (42)	109 (43)	105 (41)	103 (39)	91 (33)	79 (26)	71 (22)	109 (43)
Mean maximum °F (°C)	44.0 (6.7)	48.9 (9.4)	64.0 (17.8)	80.2 (26.8)	86.1 (30.1)	91.0 (32.8)	94.5 (34.7)	92.4 (33.6)	87.6 (30.9)	79.7 (26.5)	62.4 (16.9)	44.4 (6.9)	95.8 (35.4)
Mean daily maximum °F (°C)	20.4 (−6.4)	25.5 (−3.6)	37.9 (3.3)	52.6 (11.4)	65.4 (18.6)	75.9 (24.4)	80.6 (27.0)	78.8 (26.0)	70.9 (21.6)	56.3 (13.5)	39.1 (3.9)	25.4 (−3.7)	52.4 (11.3)
Daily mean °F (°C)	11.0 (−11.7)	15.1 (−9.4)	28.1 (−2.2)	41.4 (5.2)	54.3 (12.4)	64.9 (18.3)	69.4 (20.8)	67.3 (19.6)	58.5 (14.7)	44.5 (6.9)	29.5 (−1.4)	16.7 (−8.5)	41.7 (5.4)
Mean daily minimum °F (°C)	1.7 (−16.8)	4.8 (−15.1)	18.3 (−7.6)	30.3 (−0.9)	43.2 (6.2)	53.8 (12.1)	58.2 (14.6)	55.7 (13.2)	46.1 (7.8)	32.7 (0.4)	19.9 (−6.7)	8.1 (−13.3)	31.1 (−0.5)
Mean minimum °F (°C)	−22.7 (−30.4)	−20.1 (−28.9)	−5.9 (−21.1)	15.3 (−9.3)	27.6 (−2.4)	39.8 (4.3)	45.3 (7.4)	41.2 (5.1)	28.4 (−2.0)	15.5 (−9.2)	−0.2 (−17.9)	−16.3 (−26.8)	−28.1 (−33.4)
Record low °F (°C)	−41 (−41)	−44 (−42)	−29 (−34)	−5 (−21)	12 (−11)	24 (−4)	33 (1)	30 (−1)	9 (−13)	−4 (−20)	−23 (−31)	−37 (−38)	−44 (−42)
Average precipitation inches (mm)	0.52 (13)	0.63 (16)	1.18 (30)	2.06 (52)	3.87 (98)	3.98 (101)	3.45 (88)	2.82 (72)	3.06 (78)	1.93 (49)	0.76 (19)	0.52 (13)	24.78 (629)
Average snowfall inches (cm)	4.6 (12)	4.9 (12)	5.4 (14)	2.6 (6.6)	0.0 (0.0)	0.0 (0.0)	0.0 (0.0)	0.0 (0.0)	0.0 (0.0)	0.0 (0.0)	3.2 (8.1)	7.4 (19)	28.1 (71.7)
Average precipitation days (≥ 0.01 in)	3.8	3.4	4.4	7.1	9.5	9.9	8.1	7.3	6.6	5.5	3.3	4.9	73.8
Average snowy days (≥ 0.1 in)	3.8	2.7	2.2	0.8	0.0	0.0	0.0	0.0	0.0	0.1	2.2	3.6	15.4
Source 1: NOAA (1981-2010 snowfall)
Source 2: XMACIS2 (temp records & monthly max/mins)

== Demographics ==
Historical population
Census	Pop.	Note	%±
1900	430		—
1910	594		38.1%
1920	582		−2.0%
1930	500		−14.1%
1940	493		−1.4%
1950	498		1.0%
1960	500		0.4%
1970	523		4.6%
1980	557		6.5%
1990	549		−1.4%
2000	666		21.3%
2010	627		−5.9%
2020	698		11.3%
2022 (est.)	707		1.3%
U.S. Decennial Census; 2020 Census

=== 2020 census ===
As of the 2020 census, Castlewood had a population of 698, 270 households, and 180 families. The median age was 35.3 years; 30.1% of residents were under the age of 18 and 15.5% were 65 years of age or older. For every 100 females there were 98.9 males, and for every 100 females age 18 and over there were 99.2 males age 18 and over.

0.0% of residents lived in urban areas, while 100.0% lived in rural areas.

There were 270 households in Castlewood, of which 38.5% had children under the age of 18 living in them. Of all households, 54.4% were married-couple households, 19.3% were households with a male householder and no spouse or partner present, and 24.4% were households with a female householder and no spouse or partner present. About 30.3% of all households were made up of individuals and 11.5% had someone living alone who was 65 years of age or older.

There were 296 housing units, of which 8.8% were vacant. The homeowner vacancy rate was 3.3% and the rental vacancy rate was 9.9%.

Racial composition as of the 2020 census
Race	Number	Percent
White	641	91.8%
Black or African American	1	0.1%
American Indian and Alaska Native	12	1.7%
Asian	0	0.0%
Native Hawaiian and Other Pacific Islander	1	0.1%
Some other race	19	2.7%
Two or more races	24	3.4%
Hispanic or Latino (of any race)	28	4.0%

=== 2010 census ===
As of the 2010 census, there were 627 people in 260 households, including 158 families, in the city. The population density was 545.2 inhabitants per square mile (210.5/km^{2}). There were 292 housing units at an average density of 253.9 per square mile (98.0/km^{2}). The racial makeup of the city was 96.5% White, 0.5% African American, 0.5% Native American, 0.2% Asian, 1.4% from other races, and 1.0% from two or more races. Hispanic or Latino of any race were 1.8%.

Of the 260 households 35.4% had children under the age of 18 living with them, 50.4% were married couples living together, 6.9% had a female householder with no husband present, 3.5% had a male householder with no wife present, and 39.2% were non-families. 33.5% of households were one person and 17.6% were one person aged 65 or older. The average household size was 2.41 and the average family size was 3.16.

The median age was 36.2 years. 28.2% of residents were under the age of 18; 7.4% were between the ages of 18 and 24; 26% were from 25 to 44; 24% were from 45 to 64; and 14.5% were 65 or older. The gender makeup of the city was 50.2% male and 49.8% female.

=== 2000 census ===
As of the 2000 census, there were 666 people in 253 households, including 185 families, in the city. The population density was 585.9 inhabitants per square mile (226.2/km^{2}). There were 265 housing units at an average density of 233.1 per square mile (90.0/km^{2}). The racial makeup of the city was 98.95% White, 0.45% Native American, and 0.60% from two or more races. Hispanic or Latino of any race were 0.30%. 38.1% were of German, 18.4% Norwegian, 9.9% Dutch, 6.8% American, 6.4% Irish and 5.6% English ancestry.

Of the 253 households 40.3% had children under the age of 18 living with them, 60.5% were married couples living together, 7.9% had a female householder with no husband present, and 26.5% were non-families. 24.1% of households were one person and 14.2% were one person aged 65 or older. The average household size was 2.57 and the average family size was 3.06.

The age distribution was 28.5% under the age of 18, 8.1% from 18 to 24, 26.6% from 25 to 44, 20.6% from 45 to 64, and 16.2% 65 or older. The median age was 35 years. For every 100 females, there were 94.7 males. For every 100 females age 18 and over, there were 91.9 males.

The median income was $36,607 and the median income for a family was $41,806. Males had a median income of $29,688 versus $20,750 for females. The per capita income for the city was $17,682. About 7.7% of families and 7.1% of the population were below the poverty line, including 12.0% of those under age 18 and 6.7% of those age 65 or over.

== Education ==
It is in the Castlewood School District 28-1.

== Notable people ==
- Marvin Heemeyer, perpetrator of a bulldozer rampage in Colorado
- Kristi Noem, U.S. secretary of homeland security and governor of South Dakota

== See also ==
- List of cities in South Dakota
