= Lake Norden, South Dakota =

- City
- Motto: "Cheese Is Our Whey"
- Location in Hamlin County and the state of South Dakota
- Coordinates: 44°34′48″N 97°12′39″W
- Country: United States
- State: South Dakota
- County: Hamlin
- Incorporated: 1916

Area
  - Total: 0.92 sq mi (2.38 km^{2})
  - Land: 0.87 sq mi (2.26 km^{2})
  - Water: 0.046 sq mi (0.12 km^{2})
- Elevation: 1,690 ft (520 m)

Population (2020)
  - Total: 554
  - Density: 635.2/sq mi (245.26/km^{2})
- Time zone: UTC-6 (Central (CST))
  - Summer (DST): UTC-5 (CDT)
- ZIP code: 57248
- Area code: 605
- FIPS code: 46-35460
- GNIS feature ID: 1267451
- Website: lakenorden.govoffice.com

Lake Norden is a city in Hamlin County, South Dakota, United States. It is part of the Watertown, South Dakota Micropolitan Statistical Area. The population was 554 at the 2020 census.

Lake Norden was laid out in 1908, and named after a lake near the town site.

In May 2023, a fire destroyed the city's volunteer fire department.

== Attractions ==
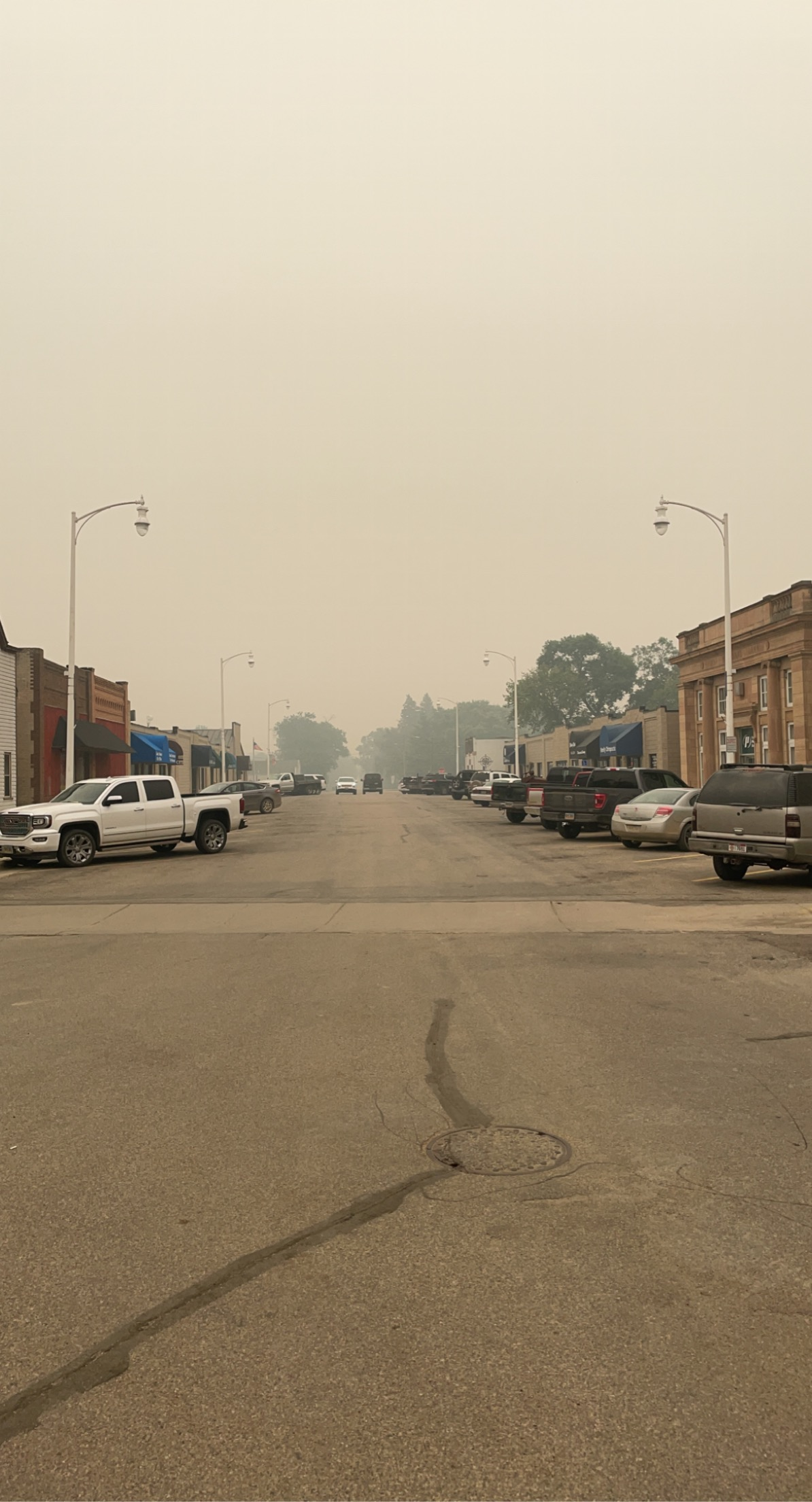
Main Avenue in Lake Norden appears hazy from the July 2021 Lake Winnipeg forest fires

Lake Norden is the home of the South Dakota Amateur Baseball Hall of Fame.

The Agropur, Inc. plant in Lake Norden employs roughly as many people as the amount that live in the town. In 2019 the plant completed an addition that tripled daily cheese output to just under a million pounds a day. It produces and ships many food ingredients, including whey protein products and cheeses.

== Geography ==
According to the United States Census Bureau, the city has a total area of 0.88 square miles (2.28 km^{2}), of which 0.83 square miles (2.15 km^{2}) is land and 0.05 square miles (0.13 km^{2}) is water.

== Demographics ==
Historical population
Census	Pop.	Note	%±
1910	202		—
1920	408		102.0%
1930	459		12.5%
1940	463		0.9%
1950	373		−19.4%
1960	390		4.6%
1970	393		0.8%
1980	417		6.1%
1990	427		2.4%
2000	432		1.2%
2010	467		8.1%
2020	554		18.6%
U.S. Decennial Census

=== 2020 census ===
As of the 2020 census, Lake Norden had a population of 554. The median age was 35.6 years. 29.1% of residents were under the age of 18 and 24.5% of residents were 65 years of age or older. For every 100 females there were 101.5 males, and for every 100 females age 18 and over there were 94.6 males age 18 and over.

0.0% of residents lived in urban areas, while 100.0% lived in rural areas.

There were 187 households in Lake Norden, of which 24.6% had children under the age of 18 living in them. Of all households, 53.5% were married-couple households, 21.4% were households with a male householder and no spouse or partner present, and 23.5% were households with a female householder and no spouse or partner present. About 33.6% of all households were made up of individuals and 17.7% had someone living alone who was 65 years of age or older.

There were 220 housing units, of which 15.0% were vacant. The homeowner vacancy rate was 0.8% and the rental vacancy rate was 13.5%.

Racial composition as of the 2020 census
Race	Number	Percent
White	507	91.5%
Black or African American	0	0.0%
American Indian and Alaska Native	8	1.4%
Asian	0	0.0%
Native Hawaiian and Other Pacific Islander	0	0.0%
Some other race	29	5.2%
Two or more races	10	1.8%
Hispanic or Latino (of any race)	34	6.1%

=== 2010 census ===
As of the census of 2010, there were 467 people, 175 households, and 106 families residing in the city. The population density was 562.7 inhabitants per square mile (217.3/km^{2}). There were 198 housing units at an average density of 238.6 per square mile (92.1/km^{2}). The racial makeup of the city was 93.1% White, 0.4% Native American, 5.6% from other races, and 0.9% from two or more races. Hispanic or Latino of any race were 7.3% of the population.

There were 175 households, of which 28.0% had children under the age of 18 living with them, 49.7% were married couples living together, 6.9% had a female householder with no husband present, 4.0% had a male householder with no wife present, and 39.4% were non-families. 35.4% of all households were made up of individuals, and 17.7% had someone living alone who was 65 years of age or older. The average household size was 2.31 and the average family size was 3.02.

The median age in the city was 46.4 years. 21.8% of residents were under the age of 18; 8.5% were between the ages of 18 and 24; 19.5% were from 25 to 44; 21% were from 45 to 64; and 29.3% were 65 years of age or older. The gender makeup of the city was 46.0% male and 54.0% female.

=== 2000 census ===
As of the census of 2000, there were 432 people, 172 households, and 99 families residing in the city. The population density was 654.3 inhabitants per square mile (252.6/km^{2}). There were 193 housing units at an average density of 292.3 per square mile (112.9/km^{2}). The racial makeup of the city was 97.92% White, 1.39% Native American, 0.23% Asian, 0.23% from other races, and 0.23% from two or more races. Hispanic or Latino of any race were 0.93% of the population. 29.6% were of Norwegian, 26.8% German, 14.0% Finnish, and 7.5% Swedish ancestry according to Census 2000.

There were 172 households, out of which 26.7% had children under the age of 18 living with them, 49.4% were married couples living together, 5.8% had a female householder with no husband present, and 41.9% were non-families. 38.4% of all households were made up of individuals, and 19.8% had someone living alone who was 65 years of age or older. The average household size was 2.22 and the average family size was 3.01.

In the city, the population was spread out, with 21.8% under the age of 18, 7.2% from 18 to 24, 23.4% from 25 to 44, 19.2% from 45 to 64, and 28.5% who were 65 years of age or older. The median age was 43 years. For every 100 females, there were 91.2 males. For every 100 females age 18 and over, there were 88.8 males.

The median income for a household in the city was $28,194, and the median income for a family was $42,000. Males had a median income of $26,667 versus $14,063 for females. The per capita income for the city was $14,852. About 7.4% of families and 14.2% of the population were below the poverty line, including 6.6% of those under age 18 and 26.4% of those age 65 or over.

== Education ==
It is in the Hamlin School District 28-3. The local PK-12 school facility is the Hamlin Education Center, which includes Hamlin Elementary School, Hamlin Middle School, and Hamlin High School, located west of the Hayti city limits.
