= South Dakota Highway 20 =

State highway in South Dakota, United States

Highway 20

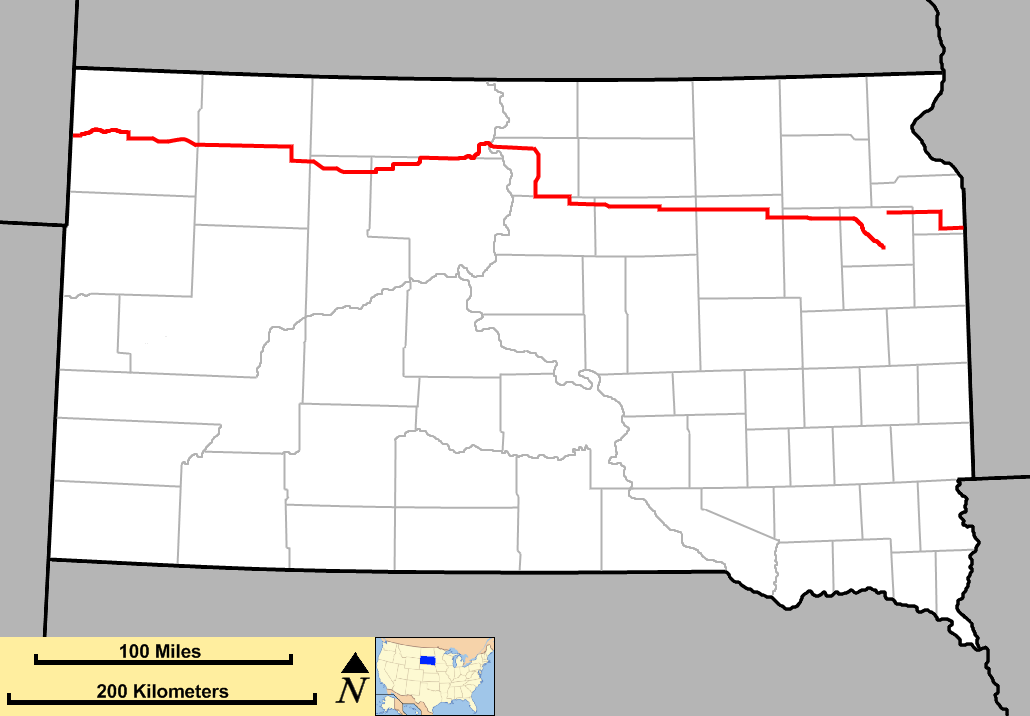
- Map of South Dakota with SD 20 in red

Route information
- Maintained by SDDOT
- Length: 385.079 mi (619.725 km)
- Existed: c. 1930–present
- Tourist routes: Lewis and Clark Trail; Native American Scenic Byway

Western segment
- Length: 346.065 mi (556.938 km)
- West end: Montana state line near Camp Crook
- Major intersections: US 85 from Buffalo to south of Buffalo; US 12 from near Mobridge to south of Selby; US 83 from northwest of Selby to southwest of Lowry; US 281 in Mellette
- East end: US 212 in Watertown

Eastern segment
- Length: 39.014 mi (62.787 km)
- West end: CR 11 (455th Avenue) west of South Shore
- Major intersections: I-29 / US 81 west of South Shore; SD 15 from east of Stockholm to near Revillo
- East end: MN 40 at the Minnesota state line near Revillo

Location
- Country: United States
- State: South Dakota
- Counties: Harding; Perkins; Ziebach; Dewey; Corson; Walworth; Potter; Faulk; Spink; Clark; Codington; Grant

Highway system
- South Dakota State Trunk Highway System; Interstate; US; State
← SD 19	→ SD 21

South Dakota Highway 20 (SD 20) is a 385.079-mile (619.725 km) state highway in northern South Dakota, United States, that connects the Montana state line, west-southwest of Camp Crook, with the Minnesota state line, east-southeast of Revillo, via Buffalo, Bison, Timber Lake, Mobridge, Selby, and Watertown. From Mobridge to the Walworth–Potter county line, this highway is part of the Lewis and Clark Trail. From Timber Lake to just west of Mobridge, this highway is part of the Native American Scenic Byway. From the Montana state line to Camp Crook, the highway is a dirt road.

SD 20 is composed of two disconnected segments. The longer western segment extends 346 miles (557 km) from Montana to Watertown. The much-shorter eastern segment extends 39 miles (63 km) from west of South Shore to Minnesota. However, the South Dakota Department of Transportation previously indicated that SD 20 followed US 212, US 81, and Interstate 29 (I-29) between the two segments.

SD 20 originally extended from SD 45 west of Cresbard to Watertown. It was extended west to U.S. Route 83, southwest of Lowry. Later, it was extended to its current eastern terminus. Later still, it was extended to its current western terminus, replacing what had been SD 8 (and later SD 18).

== Route description ==
=== Harding County ===
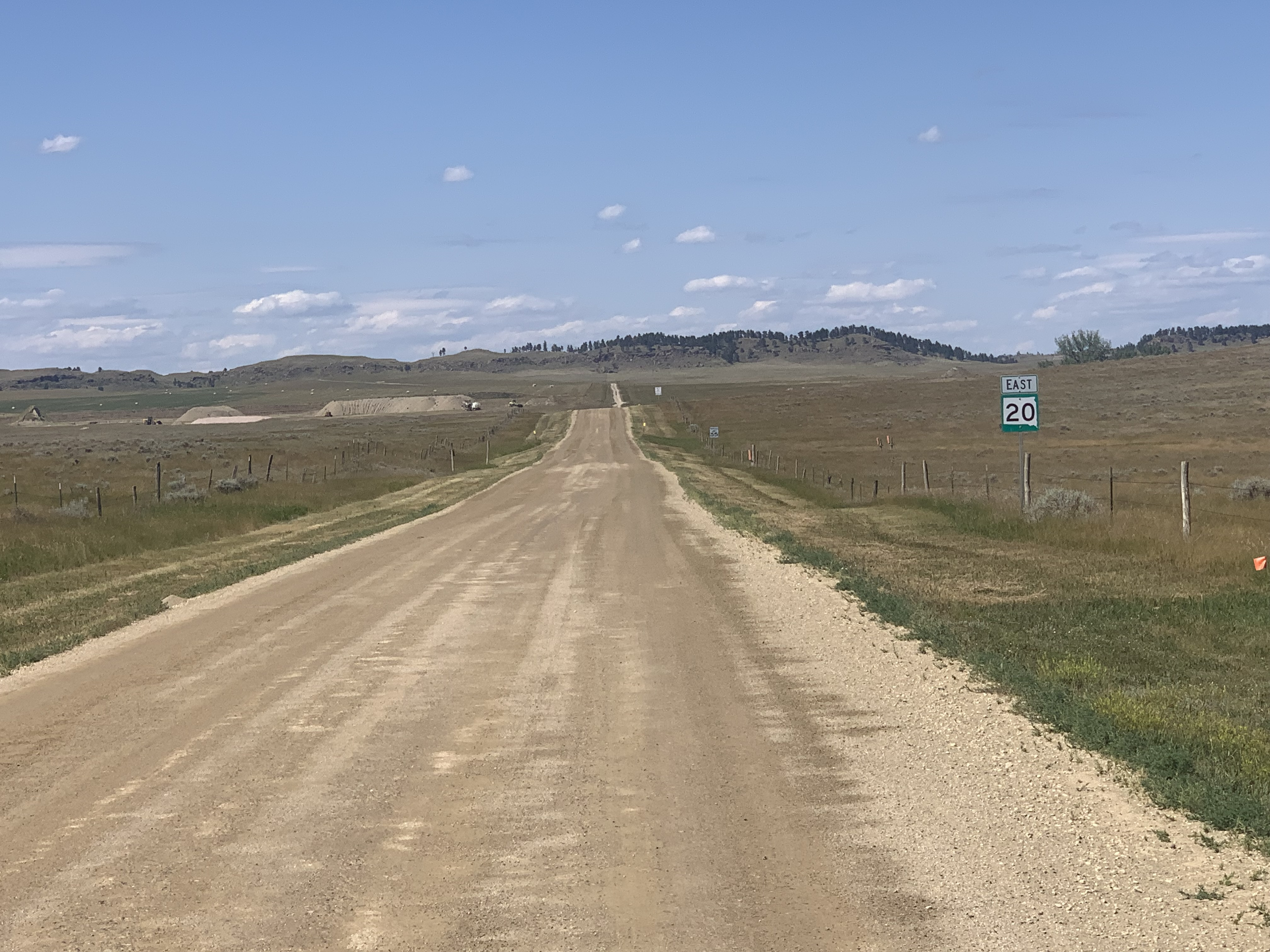
Highway 20 begins as a dirt road at the Montana-South Dakota border

SD 20 begins at an intersection with the eastern terminus of Tie Creek Road on the Montana state line west-southwest of Camp Crook, in the west-central part of Harding County. Here, the roadway continues to the south as Little Missouri Road. Although SD20 touches the Montana border, they and South Dakota are the only states to share a land border that is not traversed by a paved road.SD 20 travels to the north on the state line as a dirt road. Approximately 2,000 feet (610 m) later, it curves to a due-east direction. About four miles later it has a short curve northeast, then enters Camp Crook, where the highway's dirt portion ends. Just east of Park Avenue, it curves to the southeast and leaves Camp Crook. It crosses over the Little Missouri River, then turns east again and intersects the northern terminus of South Camp Crook Road, which leads to Sky Ranch and Belle Fourche. The highway curves to the east-northeast. SD 20 parallels a brief portion of Ash Creek. Farther to the east, it crosses over Graves Creek. Then, it parallels a brief portion of Brush Creek. It intersects the southern terminus of Clanton Road, which leads to Gardner Lake. Just before entering Buffalo, it crosses over Rush Creek. In the south-central part of the town, it intersects U.S. Route 85. The highways begin a concurrency to the south. Almost immediately, they leave Buffalo. They cross over the South Fork Grand River. When they split, SD 20 resumes its eastward direction. It curves to the east-southeast and crosses over Clarks Fork Creek. It intersects the northern terminus of Park Road, which leads to the Antelope Range and Livestock Research Station. It curves to the east-northeast and enters Custer National Forest. The highway travels through Reva Gap and passes Flag Rock. It curves to the northeast and leaves the forest. Just before curving to the east, it passes the location of the Battle of Slim Buttes, a battle fought between the United States Army and the Sioux. It then begins a concurrency with SD 79. This intersection is also the southern terminus of Tickle Hill Place. The two highways travel through Reva. They curve to the east-southeast and then split. SD 20 curves to the southeast and then back to the east. At an intersection with 155th Avenue, it enters the west-central part of Perkins County.

=== Perkins County ===
SD 20 continues to the east and travels through Prairie City. Almost immediately, it crosses over the South Fork Thunder Butte Creek. Approximately 1.2 miles (1.9 km) east of Divide Road, it crosses over this creek again. At an intersection with the northern terminus of 170th Avenue, SD 20 meets the southern terminus of SD 75. The highway then enters the far northern part of Bison. The highway travels through rural areas of the county. It travels through Meadow and then intersects SD 73. The two highways travel concurrently to the south. When they split, they also met the eastern terminus of Rolling Hills Road. SD 20 continues to the east. It travels just north of Coal Springs. A little ways east of 200th Avenue, it enters the northeast part of both Ziebach County and the Cheyenne River Indian Reservation.

=== Ziebach County ===
SD 20 curves to the southeast and then back to the east. It begins to curve back to the southeast just before traveling through Glad Valley. Just before Dorsey Road, it curves back to the east. It intersects SD 65 on the Ziebach–Dewey county line. The two highways travel concurrently to the east, on part of the county line. A short distance later, they enter Dewey County proper.

=== Dewey and Corson counties ===
SD 20 and SD 65 continue to the east. They skirt along the southern edge of Isabel Municipal Airport and then curve to the north. They enter the city limits of Isabel. They curve to the northeast, where they split. SD 20 curves to the east and leaves Isabel. It curves to the north and enters Firesteel. It begins a curve to the east and leaves the community. It crosses the Little Moreau River, and almost immediately, intersects the southern terminus of County Road 243 (243rd Avenue) and SD 63. SD 20 and SD 63 begin to travel concurrently to the east. Just west of an intersection with 248th Avenue, they begin to curve to the east-northeast. They then enter Timber Lake. Almost immediately, they intersect the northern terminus of H Street, which leads to the Timber Lake Municipal Airport and the Little Moreau Recreation Area. In the north-central part of the city is an intersection with Main Street, which leads to the business district. They leave Timber Lake and curve to the north. They then curve to the east and begin to travel on the Dewey–Corson county line, which is also the dividing line between the Cheyenne River and Standing Rock Sioux reservations. They continue to the east through rural areas and then split, with SD 20 continuing to the east. Just west of the appropriately-named Lake Road, the highway travels just south of the Trail City Railroad Lake. It then travels through Trail City. SD 20 curves to the north-northeast, entering Corson County and Standing Rock Sioux Reservation proper, and curves back to the east. It curves to the northeast and then to the north. It curves to the north-northeast and intersects US 12. The two highways travel concurrently to the southeast. They curve to the northeast and cross over Claymore Creek. They intersect SD 1806, which joins the concurrency. The three highways continue to the northeast and curve to the east-southeast, where SD 1806 leaves to the north. US 12 and SD 20 head to the southeast, skirting along the southern edge of the Indian Memorial Recreation Area. They cross over part of the Missouri River known as Lake Oahe (signed as "Missouri River Lake Oahe") Here, they leave the Standing Rock Sioux Reservation and enter the northwestern part of Walworth County.

=== Walworth and Potter counties ===
US 12 and SD 20 cross over some railroad tracks of BNSF Railway and curve to the south. During this curve, they enter Mobridge. Just south of 12th Street West, they curve to the southeast. Just south of 6th Street West, they curve to the east. At 4th Avenue East, SD 1804 joins the concurrency. It intersects Airport Road and Revheim Road, which lead to Mobridge Municipal Airport, the South Dakota National Guard armory, and the Revheim Park Recreation Area. The highways then leave Mobridge. A short distance later, SD 1804 departs to the south, while US 12 and SD 20 continue to the east. Just to the east of 293rd Avenue is a crossing of Blanket Creek. They enter the northern part of Glenham. Immediately, they have an intersection with the southern terminus of Glenham Road, which leads to Pollock. Just to the east of Main Street, they leave Glenham and continue to the east. Just east of 305th Avenue, they intersect US 83, which joins the concurrency. The three highways curve to the southeast and then to the south. They then enter Selby. At an intersection with Scranton Street, they meet the western terminus of SD 130. Just south of Walworth Street, they cross over some railroad tracks of BNSF Railway and pass some sewage disposal ponds. Then, they leave Selby. Just before an intersection with 134th Street, US 12 splits off to the southeast, while US 83 and SD 20 turn right to the southwest. They curve back to the south. Between 136th and 137th streets, they cross over Rieger Creek. Just south of 139th Street, they curve to the southwest. Just northeast of 306th Avenue, they curve to the south. They intersect the eastern terminus of SD 144 (142nd Street). Just north of 144th Street, they curve to the south-southeast and cross over Swan Creek. Just north of 147th Street, they curve back to the south. At 148th Street, on the Walworth–Potter county line, SD 20 splits off to the east, on the county line. Just east of 318th Avenue, it passes Hoven Municipal Airport. At 319th Avenue, SD 47 joins SD 20 in a concurrency to the east. Almost immediately, they enter Hoven. They pass a city park and then make a 90-degree curve to the south. They enter the main part of Hoven and Potter County proper. Between 3rd and 4th avenues, they pass a bus station. Between 5th and 6th avenues, they pass Hoven High School. South of 7th Avenue, they leave Hoven and continue to the south. At an intersection with the eastern terminus of CR 819 (151st Street), SD 20 splits off to the east. It travels just to the south of Tolstoy. At an intersection with 329th Avenue, it enters the northwestern part of Faulk County.

=== Faulk County ===
SD 20 curves to the southeast and travels through the northeastern part of Onaka. It then curves back to the east. Between 340th and 343rd avenues, it passes Clark Lake. Between 348th and 349th avenues, the highway travels just north of Norbeck. East of 357th Avenue, it intersects SD 45. This intersection is also the western terminus of CR 2-1 (152nd Street). The two highways travel concurrently to the south. They cross over the western part of Lake Cresbard. At an intersection with 154th Street, they split, with SD 20 heading to the east. Between 360th and 361st avenues, it crosses the North Fork Snake Creek. Then, it travels just south of Cresbard. Just west of 374th Avenue, the highway crosses over Perry Creek. Just west of 372nd Avenue, it travels just south of Chelsea. At an intersection with 373rd Avenue, it enters the northwestern part of Spink County.

=== Spink County ===
SD 20 heads to the east-northeast. East of 375th Avenue, it crosses over Snake Creek. Just west of CR 19 (378th Avenue), it crosses over this creek again. Just to the east of this intersection is a third crossing of this creek. At an intersection with 382nd Avenue, it curves to the east-southeast. East of this intersection, it enters the northern part of Northville. Between Front Street and 383rd Avenue, it crosses over some railroad tracks of Union Pacific Railroad. The highway then leaves Northville. It intersects US 281 (386th Avenue) and then travels through the northern part of Mellette. Just east of the appropriately-named Railway Avenue, it crosses over some railroad tracks of BNSF Railway. East of 391st Avenue, SD 20 crosses over the James River. Just east of 395th Avenue, it travels through the southern part of Brentford. Just east of 399th Avenue, it crosses over Dry Run. East of 405th Avenue, the highway enters the southwestern part of Conde. It has an intersection with SD 37 and the western terminus of CR 6 (154th Street). SD 20 and SD 37 begin a concurrency to the south. CR 6 (154th Street) is signed as a truck route. Almost immediately, SD 20 and SD 37 leave Conde. At an intersection with the eastern terminus of CR 8 (157th Street), the two highways split, with SD 20 continuing its eastward trek. Between 411th and 412th avenues, it enters the northwestern part of Clark County.

=== Clark County ===
SD 20 continues traveling in a roughly eastward direction. Just west of 421st Avenue, it curves to the east-southeast and then skirts along the northern edge of Crocker. The highway curves back to the east. East of 428th Avenue, it travels through the northern part of Bradley. East of 433rd Avenue, it intersects SD 25. At an intersection with 436th Avenue, which is northwest of Wallace, it enters the northwestern part of Codington County.

=== Codington County ===
SD 20 continues to the east and travels north of Wallace. East of 441st Avenue, and north of Grass Lake, the highway curves to the southeast. Just southeast of 444th Avenue and Sixth Street, it travels through the eastern part of Florence. Between 161st Street and 445th Avenue, it skirts along the eastern edge of Dry Lake State Public Shooting Area. After it begins a curve to the south, it travels through the western part of the American Game Association State Public Shooting Area. South of 163rd Street, it curves to the southeast and travels just northeast of the Chain of Lakes. It curves to the south and intersects 450th Avenue north of Lake Kampeska. This road, which is unsigned as SD 20P, leads to the path of former SD 139. It curves to the east-southeast and intersects North Lake Drive, which was the northern terminus of SD 139. The highway curves to the southeast and parallels part of the lake. It then intersects the northern terminus of South Lake Drive, which leads to Lake City Park. The highway then becomes a divided highway and enters Watertown. It immediately intersects the northern terminus of Airport Drive, which leads to Watertown Municipal Airport and the Lake Area Technical Institute's Aviation Annex. It then intersects Sioux Conifer Road, which leads to Big Sioux State Tree Nursery. Just southwest of 14th Avenue, the divided highway portion ends, and the traffic reverts to two-way traffic. Just before 10th Street Northwest, the highway curves to the south. It intersects 10th Avenue Northwest, which leads to Prairie Lakes Hospital. It passes the Bramble Park Zoo. An intersection with Kemp Avenue West leads to the business district, the Watertown Stadium, and the Codington County Extension Center and Agricultural Building. It then intersects US 212 (9th Avenue South). Here, the western segment ends and the roadway continues as 20th Avenue South. Until March 2022, SDDOT indicated that SD 20 followed US 212 east in Watertown, US 81 from Watertown to northeast of Watertown, and Interstate 29 (I-29) and US 81 from there to just east of the western terminus of the eastern segment, west of South Shore. However, this implication was unsigned.

Officially, the eastern segment of SD 20 begins at an intersection with CR 11 (455th Avenue) and CR 2 (157th Street) west of South Shore in the northeastern part of Codington County. It travels to the east and has an interchange with I-29/US 81. East of 462nd Avenue, it curves to the southeast and crosses over some railroad tracks of BNSF Railway. It curves back to the east, just south of Punished Woman Lake and the South Punished Womans State Public Shooting Area. Almost immediately, it travels through South Shore. It travels between Larson State Public Shooting Area and Round Lake. Almost immediately, it enters the southwestern part of Grant County.

=== Grant County ===
SD 20 continues to the east. Just west of CR 9 (468th Avenue), it crosses over some railroad tracks of BNSF Railway. Just west of 470th Avenue, it travels through the northern part of Stockholm. East of 477th Avenue, it intersects SD 15 (478th Avenue) and the western terminus of SD 158 (157th Street). At this intersection, SD 15 and SD 20 travel concurrently to the south. Just south of 161st Street, which is east-southeast of La Bolt, the two highways cross over some railroad tracks of BNSF Railway. South of 163rd Street, they cross over the South Fork Yellow Bank River. At an intersection with the eastern terminus of CR 20 (164th Street), SD 20 splits off to the east. Between 481st and 483rd avenues, the highway travels through the southern part of Revillo. East of 482nd Avenue, it crosses over Mud Creek. It continues to the east until it reaches the Minnesota state line. Here, it intersects 488th Avenue and ends. The roadway continues as Minnesota State Highway 40 (MN 40).

=== National Highway System ===
The only segment of SD 20 that is included as part of the National Highway System, a system of routes determined to be the most important for the nation's economy, mobility and defense, is the portion concurrent with US 12 and US 83 from west-northwest of Mobridge to southwest of Lowry.

== History ==
SD 20 was established between 1929 and 1932. At this time, it extended from SD 45 west of Cresbard to Watertown. In the mid-1940s, it was extended westward to US 83 at the Walworth–Potter county line. By 1953, a short stub was established between Akaska and US 83. Also, north of Watertown, a stub was added between US 81's former path (current western terminus of the eastern segment) and what was US 77 (now SD 15). In 1954, the highway was extended further to the east, from US 77 and the Minnesota state line, as it currently does. In the late 1960s, the stub between Akaska and US 83 was redesignated as SD 20 Spur. At this time, the SD 20 mainline was extended to its current western terminus, absorbing what had been SD 8 and later SD 18.

== Major intersections ==
County	Location	mi	km	Destinations	Notes
Montana state line		0.00	0.00	Tie Creek Road west / Little Missouri Road south	Western terminus; roadway continues south as Little Missouri Road (unpaved).
Harding	Buffalo	27.81	44.76	US 85 north – Bowman, ND	Western end of US 85 concurrency
Harding	North Harding–South Harding line	29.31	47.17	US 85 south – Belle Fourche	Eastern end of US 85 concurrency
Harding	North Harding–South Harding line	51.74	83.27	SD 79 south / Tickle Hill Place north – Newell	Western end of SD 79 concurrency; southern terminus of Tickle Hill Place
Harding	North Harding–South Harding line	56.19	90.43	SD 79 north – Reeder	Eastern end of SD 79 concurrency
Perkins	Scotch Cap Township	73.92	118.96	SD 75 north – Lodgepole, Hettinger	Southern terminus of SD 75
Perkins	Grand Central Township	96.97	156.06	SD 73 north – Lemmon	Western end of SD 73 concurrency
Perkins	Easter Township	103.03	165.81	SD 73 south / Rolling Hills Road west – Faith	Eastern end of SD 73 concurrency; eastern terminus of Rolling Hills Road
Ziebach–Dewey county line	North Ziebach–North Dewey line	137.44	221.19	SD 65 south – Dupree	Western end of SD 65 concurrency
Dewey	Isabel	141.10	227.08	SD 65 north – McIntosh	Eastern end of SD 65 concurrency
Dewey	North Dewey	152.82	245.94	SD 63 south / 243rd Avenue north / Lewis and Clark Trail – Eagle Butte	Western end of SD 63 concurrency; southern terminus of County Road 243 (CR 243; 243rd Avenue)
Dewey–Corson county line	North Dewey–Central Corson line	175.12	281.83	SD 63 north – Little Eagle, McLaughlin	Eastern end of SD 63 concurrency
Corson	Ridgeland Township	186.69	300.45	CR 10 / Native American Scenic Byway south – Promise	Western end of Native American Scenic Byway concurrency
Corson	Mission Township	193.61	311.59	US 12 west – McLaughlin	Western end of US 12 concurrency
Corson	Mission Township	196.67	316.51	SD 1806 south – Sitting Bull Monument	Western end of SD 1806 concurrency
Corson	Mission Township	197.78	318.30	SD 1806 north / Lewis and Clark Trail / Native American Scenic Byway north – Wakpala, Indian Memorial Recreation Area	Eastern end of SD 1806 concurrency; eastern end of Native American Scenic Byway concurrency
Missouri River (Lake Oahe)		199.24	320.65	US 12 Missouri River Bridge	
Walworth	Mobridge	202.01	325.10	SD 1804 north (4th Avenue East) – Pollock	Western end of SD 1804 concurrency
Walworth	West Walworth	205.88	331.33	SD 1804 south – Akaska	Eastern end of SD 1804 concurrency
Walworth	West Walworth–East Walworth line	219.47	353.20	US 83 north – Mound City	Western end of US 83 concurrency
Walworth	Selby	222.05	357.35	SD 130 east (Scranton Street) – Java, Lake Hiddenwood State Park	Western terminus of SD 130
Walworth	West Walworth–East Walworth line	226.17	363.99	US 12 east – Ipswich	Eastern end of US 12 concurrency
Walworth	West Walworth–East Walworth line	234.78	377.84	SD 144 west (142nd Street) – Akaska	Eastern terminus of SD 144
Walworth–Potter county line	East Walworth–Central Potter line	240.83	387.58	US 83 south / Lewis and Clark Trail to US 212 – Agar, Pierre	Eastern end of US 83 concurrency
Walworth–Potter county line	East Walworth–East Potter line	253.87	408.56	SD 47 north to US 12	Western end of SD 47 concurrency
Potter	East Potter	257.56	414.50	SD 47 south / 151st Street west – Lebanon	Eastern end of SD 47 concurrency; eastern terminus of CR 819 (151st Street)
Faulk	Emerson Township	294.77	474.39	SD 45 north / 152nd Street east – Ipswich	Western end of SD 45 concurrency; western terminus of CR 2-1 (152nd Street)
Faulk	Emerson Township	296.77	477.61	SD 45 south to US 212 – Miller	Eastern end of SD 45 concurrency; roadway continues as 154th Street.
Spink	Mellette	321.62	517.60	US 281 – Aberdeen, Redfield	
Spink	Conde	341.61	549.77	SD 37 north / 154th Street east – Verdon	Western end of SD 37 concurrency; western terminus of CR 6 (154th Street)
Spink	Benton–Olean township line	344.63	554.63	SD 37 south / 157th Street west – Turton, Doland	Eastern end of SD 37 concurrency}; eastern terminus of CR 8 (157th Street)
Clark	Blaine Township	372.75	599.88	SD 25 – US 212, Webster	
Codington	Lake Township	393.69	633.58	SD 20 Spur (450th Avenue south)	Northern terminus of unsigned SD 20P (450th Avenue)
Codington	Lake Township	394.26	634.50	North Lake Drive south	Former SD 139 south
Codington	Watertown	400.23	644.11	US 212 (9th Avenue South) – US 81, Clark	Eastern terminus of western segment
Codington	Gap in route				
Codington	Germantown Township	416.45	670.21	CR 11 (455th Avenue) / CR 2 west (157th Street)	Western terminus of eastern segment
Codington	Germantown Township	418.74	673.90	I-29 / US 81 – Watertown, Summit	I-29 Exit 193
Grant	Madison–Vernon township line	439.25	706.90	SD 15 north (478th Avenue) – Milbank SD 158 east (157th Street)	Western end of SD 15 concurrency; Western terminus of SD 158
Grant	Georgia–Adams township line	446.24	718.15	SD 15 south – US 212	Eastern end of SD 15 concurrency
Grant	Adams Township	455.50	733.06	MN 40 east / 488th Avenue – Marietta	Eastern terminus; continuation into Minnesota
1.000 mi = 1.609 km; 1.000 km = 0.621 mi: Concurrency terminus

== Related routes ==
=== Highway 20A ===
Highway 20A
- Location: Grant County
- Length: 9.15 mi (14.73 km)
- Existed: c. 1970–late 1970s

Highway 20A (SD 20A) was an alternate route of SD 20. It was established around 1970. It originally traveled on the current path of SD 20 east of SD 15 through the Revillo area. A few years later, it was shifted to travel between US 77/SD 20, north-northeast of La Bolt, to the Minnesota state line, northeast of Albee. This highway was decommissioned at the end of the decade and was redesignated as SD 158.

=== Akaska spur ===
Highway 20 Spur
- Location: Akaska
- Existed: 1965-1970–1976

Highway 20 Spur (SD 20 Spur) was a spur route of SD 20 that traveled from Akaska east to the SD 20 mainline.

When this roadway was originally established in the early 1950s, it was part of the path of SD 20. It was redesignated as SD 20 Spur between 1965 and 1970, when SD 20 was shifted to its current path on U.S. Route 83 (US 83) in the area. The spur was further redesignated as SD 144 in 1976.

=== Watertown spur ===
Highway 20 Spur
- Location: Northwest of Watertown
- Length: 0.458 mi (737 m)

Highway 20 Spur, officially Highway 20P (SD 20P), is a spur route of SD 20 that extends one-half mile (800 m) from the SD 20 mainline to the former SD 139, now known as North Lake Drive.

== See also ==
- List of state highways in South Dakota
