= Akaska, South Dakota =

- Town
- Location in Walworth County and the state of South Dakota
- Coordinates: 45°19′52″N 100°07′15″W
- Country: United States
- State: South Dakota
- County: Walworth
- Incorporated: 1907

Area
  - Total: 0.61 sq mi (1.58 km^{2})
  - Land: 0.61 sq mi (1.58 km^{2})
  - Water: 0 sq mi (0.00 km^{2})
- Elevation: 1,772 ft (540 m)

Population (2020)
  - Total: 77
  - Density: 126.1/sq mi (48.68/km^{2})
- Time zone: UTC-6 (Central (CST))
  - Summer (DST): UTC-5 (CDT)
- ZIP code: 57420
- Area code: 605
- FIPS code: 46-00540
- GNIS feature ID: 1267260

Akaska (/əˈkæskə/; ə-KAS-kə) is a town in Walworth County, South Dakota, United States. The population was 77 at the 2020 census. The community name derives from a Sioux word meaning "uncertain".

== History ==
Akaska was founded in 1907 as a station stop on a branch line of the Minneapolis and St. Louis Railway built that year between Conde and LeBeau, South Dakota. Railway service to Akaska ended in 1940.

== Geography ==
According to the United States Census Bureau, the town has a total area of 0.61 square miles (1.58 km^{2}), all land. It sits at an elevation of 1,772 (540m) above sea level. Its placement 9 miles (14.48km) east of the Missouri River and Lake Oahe makes it a popular destination for fishing. Nearby towns include Glenham, Java, and Lowry.

== Economy ==
As of 2024, Akaska employs 56 people. It experienced an 86.7% increase in employment since 2023, where it had employed 30 people. The largest industries in Akaska are manufacturing, other services (except Public Administration), agriculture, forestry, fishing and hunting.

== Culture ==
Akaska hosts a 4th of July parade annually to celebrate the United States' independence day. Despite the name, it is celebrated a day prior on the 3rd of July.

Residents as well as visitors like to go hunting or fishing, as well as ice fishing in the winter. The town hosts the South Dakota Walleye Classic, a two-day walleye fishing tournament with cash payouts and specialty awards. In 2026, a brand new Ford Maverick truck was awarded to the angler who caught the heaviest walleye.

== Demographics ==
Historical population
Census	Pop.	Note	%±
1910	114		—
1920	101		−11.4%
1930	169		67.3%
1940	151		−10.7%
1950	84		−44.4%
1960	90		7.1%
1970	46		−48.9%
1980	49		6.5%
1990	52		6.1%
2000	31		−40.4%
2010	42		35.5%
2020	77		83.3%
U.S. Decennial Census; 2013 Estimate

=== 2010 census ===
As of the census of 2010, there were 42 people, 21 households, and 8 families residing in the town. The population density was 68.9 inhabitants per square mile (26.6/km^{2}). There were 172 housing units at an average density of 282.0 per square mile (108.9/km^{2}). The racial makeup of the town was 100.0% White.

There were 21 households, of which 19.0% had children under the age of 18 living with them, 38.1% were married couples living together, and 61.9% were non-families. 52.4% of all households were made up of individuals, and 38.1% had someone living alone who was 65 years of age or older. The average household size was 2.00 and the average family size was 3.25.

The median age in the town was 41 years. 23.8% of residents were under the age of 18; 4.8% were between the ages of 18 and 24; 21.4% were from 25 to 44; 19.1% were from 45 to 64; and 31% were 65 years of age or older. The gender makeup of the town was 50.0% male and 50.0% female.

=== 2000 census ===
As of the census of 2000, there were 31 people, 16 households, and 10 families residing in the town. The population density was 44.1 inhabitants per square mile (17.0/km^{2}). There were 188 housing units at an average density of 267.4 per square mile (103.2/km^{2}). The racial makeup of the town was 90.32% White, and 9.68% Native American.

There were 16 households, out of which 12.5% had children under the age of 18 living with them, 56.3% were married couples living together, 6.3% had a female householder with no husband present, and 37.5% were non-families. 37.5% of all households were made up of individuals, and 6.3% had someone living alone who was 65 years of age or older. The average household size was 1.94 and the average family size was 2.40.

In the town, the population was spread out, with 12.9% under the age of 18, 9.7% from 18 to 24, 6.5% from 25 to 44, 51.6% from 45 to 64, and 19.4% who were 65 years of age or older. The median age was 54 years. For every 100 females, there were 158.3 males. For every 100 females age 18 and over, there were 170.0 males.

The median income for a household in the town was $26,250, and the median income for a family was $26,250. Males had a median income of $22,500 versus $31,250 for females. The per capita income for the town was $13,689. There were 14.3% of families and 15.8% of the population living below the poverty line, including 33.3% of under eighteens and none of those over 64.
