= Antelope Range and Livestock Research Station =

US research station

- Location within South Dakota
- Nearest city: Reva, South Dakota
- Coordinates: 45.5041008°N 103.281593°W
- Area: 8,300 acres (3,400 ha)
- Operator: South Dakota State University
- Website: www3.sdstate.edu/aes/stations/antelope/index.cfm

The Antelope Range and Livestock Research Station is operated by South Dakota State University and its extension programs to improve ranching in the U.S. State of South Dakota. The site is 8,300 acres (3,400 ha) large, the largest of SDSU's research stations. This land was owned by the state and operated as a pronghorn antelope preserve until 1947, when it was transferred to the agricultural university for research into "the balance between cattle and sheep production and protection and renewal of range resources". Current work focuses on sustainable beef and sheep production on rangeland. There are 120 head of beef cow and 400 sheep now on the range. North Dakota State University operates a similar research station at Hettinger, North Dakota, which often partners with SDSU's Antelope station for sheep research.

The land is 14 miles (23 km) east of Buffalo, South Dakota, south of South Dakota Highway 20. It lies in the middle of Harding County, South Dakota, in the far northwest corner of the state. The station is about 2 miles (3.2 km) west of Custer National Forest.

== See also ==
Antelope Range and Livestock Research Station is one of seven South Dakota State University field stations. The others are:

- Cottonwood Range and Livestock Field Station near Philip, for cow/calf and heifer management, as well as water quality issues
- Oak Lake Field Station near White, for biofuels, prairie biodiversity, fire ecology, and stream ecology
- Dakota Lakes Research Station near Pierre, for study of irrigation and drylands
- Northeast Research Station near South Shore, for herbicides, fertilizers, and agronomics
- Southeast Experiment Station near Beresford, for crops and small grains
- West River Ag Center near Rapid City, for outreach in West River
