= South Dakota Highway 271 =

State highway in South Dakota, United States

Highway 271
- SD 271 highlighted in red

Route information
- Maintained by SDDOT
- Length: 25.010 mi (40.250 km)
- Existed: c. 1975–present

Walworth County segment
- Length: 11.302 mi (18.189 km)
- South end: US 12 south of Java
- Major intersections: SD 130 in Java
- North end: 315th Avenue / 124th Street on the Walworth–Campbell county line northeast of Selby

Campbell County segment
- Length: 13.708 mi (22.061 km)
- South end: SD 10 west of Eureka
- North end: CR 55 at the North Dakota state line near Artas

Location
- Country: United States
- State: South Dakota
- Counties: Walworth, Campbell

Highway system
- South Dakota State Trunk Highway System; Interstate; US; State
← SD 264	→ SD 273

South Dakota Highway 271 (SD 271) is a 25.010-mile-long (40.250 km) state highway in the north-central part of the U.S. state of South Dakota. It connects portions of northeast Walworth County with the northeastern part of Campbell County.

It consists of two disconnected segments. The southern segment extends from U.S. Route 12 (US 12) south of Java to a rural intersection at the Walworth–Campbell county line, northeast of Selby. The northern segment begins at an intersection with SD 10 west of Eureka and ends at an intersection with 102nd Street at the North Dakota state line. Here, the roadway continues as 26th Avenue SE.

The northern segment was previously SD 105 prior to the mid-1970s.

== Route description ==
=== Walworth County ===
SD 271's southern segment begins at an intersection with US 12 (134th Street) south of Java. Here, the roadway continues to the south as 314th Avenue. SD 271 heads due north on 314th Avenue and skirts along the western edge of Java. At an intersection with the eastern terminus of SD 130 (130th Street), SD 271 turns right onto 130th Street and travels to the east, while 314th Avenue continues to the north. SD 271 skirts along the northern edge of the town. At the northeastern edge of Java, it curves to the north, onto 315th Avenue, and continues to the north. Almost immediately, it crosses over some railroad tracks of BNSF Railway. The highway curves to the west, onto 125th Street, and then almost immediately back to the north on 315th Avenue. The highway continues to the north until it reaches the Campbell County. Here, this segment ends, the roadway intersects 124th Street, and continues to the north as 315th Avenue.

=== Campbell County ===
SD 271 resumes at an intersection with SD 10 (112th Street) west of Eureka. Here, the roadway continues as 319th Avenue to the south. SD 271 travels north on 319th Avenue and then crosses over Spring Creek just before traveling just to the east of Artas. It curves to the west onto 102nd Street and then back to the north on 317th Avenue. After a slight eastward bend, SD 271 reaches its northern terminus, an intersection with 102nd Street at the North Dakota state line. Here, the roadway continues to the north as 26th Avenue SE.

== Major intersections ==
County	Location	mi	km	Destinations	Notes
Walworth		0.000	0.000	US 12 (134th Street) / 314th Avenue south – US 83, Ipswich	Southern terminus; roadway continues as 314th Avenue
Walworth	Java	4.289	6.902	SD 130 west (130th Street) / 314th Avenue north – Selby	Eastern terminus of SD 130; roadway continues as 314th Avenue
Walworth–Campbell county line		11.302	18.189	124th Street / 315th Avenue north	Roadway continues as 315th Avenue
Gap in route
Campbell		15.307	24.634	SD 10 (112th Street) / 319th Avenue south – US 83, Java, Eureka	Roadway continues as 319th Avenue
Campbell		25.010	40.250	CR 55 (26th Avenue SE)	Northern terminus; continuation into North Dakota; roadway continues as 26th Avenue SE.
1.000 mi = 1.609 km; 1.000 km = 0.621 mi
