= South Dakota Highway 144 =

State highway in South Dakota, United States

Highway 144
- SD 144 highlighted in red

Route information
- Maintained by SDDOT
- Length: 3.532 mi (5.684 km)
- Existed: 1976–present

Major junctions
- South end: Riley Avenue in Akaska
- East end: US 83 / SD 20 east of Akaska

Location
- Country: United States
- State: South Dakota
- Counties: Walworth

Highway system
- South Dakota State Trunk Highway System; Interstate; US; State
| ← SD 130 | → SD 153 |

South Dakota Highway 144 (SD 144) is a short highway linking the town of Akaska to U.S. Highway 83 and SD 20. It was commissioned in 1976. This was originally the western terminus of SD 20 in the early 1950s, and became a spur of SD 20 between 1965 and 1970.

== Route description ==
Highway 144 begins at a junction with Riley Avenue in Akaska. The road travels east from Akaska, and ends at U.S. Highway 83/South Dakota Highway 20.

== Major intersections ==
The entire route is in Walworth County.

| Location | mi | km | Destinations | Notes |
|---|---|---|---|---|
| Akaska | 0.000 | 0.000 | Riley Avenue | Western terminus |
| | 3.532 | 5.684 | US 83 / SD 20 | Eastern terminus |
1.000 mi = 1.609 km; 1.000 km = 0.621 mi
