= Butler, South Dakota =

- Town
- Location in Day County and the state of South Dakota
- Coordinates: 45°15′43″N 97°42′42″W
- Country: United States
- State: South Dakota
- County: Day
- Incorporated: 1905

Area
  - Total: 0.29 sq mi (0.75 km^{2})
  - Land: 0.29 sq mi (0.75 km^{2})
  - Water: 0 sq mi (0.00 km^{2})
- Elevation: 1,814 ft (553 m)

Population (2020)
  - Total: 4
  - Density: 13.8/sq mi (5.31/km^{2})
- Time zone: UTC-6 (Central (CST))
  - Summer (DST): UTC-5 (CDT)
- ZIP code: 57219
- Area code: 605
- FIPS code: 46-08860
- GNIS feature ID: 1267306

Butler is a town in Day County, South Dakota, United States. The population was 4 at the 2020 census. Butler ties with Verdon and Lowry as the second least populous municipality in South Dakota.

== History ==
Butler was laid out in 1887, and named in honor of Harrison Butler, the original owner of the site.

== Geography ==
According to the United States Census Bureau, the town has a total area of 0.29 square miles (0.75 km^{2}), all land.

== Demographics ==
Historical population
Census	Pop.	Note	%±
1910	162		—
1920	156		−3.7%
1930	184		17.9%
1940	153		−16.8%
1950	109		−28.8%
1960	62		−43.1%
1970	38		−38.7%
1980	22		−42.1%
1990	17		−22.7%
2000	17		0.0%
2010	17		0.0%
2020	4		−76.5%
U.S. Decennial Census

=== 2010 census ===
As of the census of 2010, there were 17 people, 9 households, and 6 families residing in the town. The population density was 58.6 inhabitants per square mile (22.6/km^{2}). There were 12 housing units at an average density of 41.4 per square mile (16.0/km^{2}). The racial makeup of the town was 100.0% White.

There were 9 households, of which 66.7% were married couples living together and 33.3% were non-families. 22.2% of all households were made up of individuals. The average household size was 1.89 and the average family size was 2.17.

The median age in the town was 53.5 years. 0.0% of residents were under the age of 18; 5.9% were between the ages of 18 and 24; 23.6% were from 25 to 44; 47% were from 45 to 64; and 23.5% were 65 years of age or older. The gender makeup of the town was 64.7% male and 35.3% female.

=== 2000 census ===
As of the census of 2000, there were 17 people, 6 households, and 6 families residing in the town. The population density was 27.9 inhabitants per square mile (10.8/km^{2}). There were 7 housing units at an average density of 11.5 per square mile (4.4/km^{2}). The racial makeup of the town was 100.00% White.

There were 6 households, out of which 50.0% had children under the age of 18 living with them, 83.3% were married couples living together, and 0.0% were non-families. No households were made up of individuals, and none had someone living alone who was 65 years of age or older. The average household size was 2.83 and the average family size was 2.83.

In the town, the population was spread out, with 23.5% under the age of 18, 23.5% from 25 to 44, 41.2% from 45 to 64, and 11.8% who were 65 years of age or older. The median age was 45 years. For every 100 females, there were 112.5 males. For every 100 females age 18 and over, there were 116.7 males.

The median income for a household in the town was $16,875, and the median income for a family was $16,875. Males had a median income of $21,250 versus $0 for females. The per capita income for the town was $8,371. Below the poverty line were 23.8% of people, 28.6% of families, 40.0% of those under 18 and 33.3% of those over 64.
