= Crocker, South Dakota =

- Census-designated place
- Location in South Dakota
- Coordinates: 45°06′25″N 97°46′50″W
- Country: United States
- State: South Dakota
- County: Clark

Area
  - Total: 3.93 sq mi (10.19 km^{2})
  - Land: 3.63 sq mi (9.40 km^{2})
  - Water: 0.31 sq mi (0.80 km^{2})
- Elevation: 1,798 ft (548 m)

Population (2020)
  - Total: 19
  - Density: 5.2/sq mi (2.02/km^{2})
- Time zone: UTC-6 (Central (CST))
  - Summer (DST): UTC-5 (CDT)
- Area code: 605
- FIPS code: 46-14660
- GNIS feature ID: 2628842

Crocker is an unincorporated community and census-designated place (CDP) in Clark County, South Dakota, United States. The population was 19 at the 2020 census.

Crocker was laid out in 1906.

== Geography ==
Crocker is located in northern Clark County along South Dakota Highway 20, which leads east and southeast 40 miles (64 km) to Watertown and west 19 miles (31 km) to Conde.

According to the United States Census Bureau, the Crocker CDP has a total area of 3.9 square miles (10.2 km^{2}), of which 3.6 square miles (9.4 km^{2}) is land and 0.3 square miles (0.8 km^{2}), or 7.83%, is water.

== Demographics ==
Historical population
Census	Pop.	Note	%±
2020	19		—
U.S. Decennial Census
