= Onaka, South Dakota =

Onaka, South Dakota oyanka
- Town
- Location in Faulk County and the state of South Dakota
- Coordinates: 45°11′29″N 99°27′57″W
- Country: United States
- State: South Dakota
- County: Faulk
- Incorporated: 1924

Area
  - Total: 0.27 sq mi (0.70 km^{2})
  - Land: 0.26 sq mi (0.67 km^{2})
  - Water: 0.012 sq mi (0.03 km^{2})
- Elevation: 1,873 ft (571 m)

Population (2020)
  - Total: 13
  - Density: 50.1/sq mi (19.36/km^{2})
- Time zone: UTC-6 (Central (CST))
  - Summer (DST): UTC-5 (CDT)
- ZIP code: 57466
- Area code: 605
- FIPS code: 46-46980
- GNIS feature ID: 1267523

Onaka (Dakota: oyanka; "place") is a town in Faulk County, South Dakota, United States. The population was 13 at the 2020 census.

== History ==
Onaka was founded in 1907 as a station stop on a branch line of the Minneapolis and St. Louis Railway built that year between Conde and LeBeau, South Dakota. Railway service to Onaka ended in 1940.

== Geography ==
According to the United States Census Bureau, the town has a total area of 0.27 square miles (0.70 km^{2}), of which 0.26 square miles (0.67 km^{2}) is land and 0.01 square miles (0.03 km^{2}) is water.

== Demographics ==
Historical population
Census	Pop.	Note	%±
1930	164		—
1940	139		−15.2%
1950	158		13.7%
1960	85		−46.2%
1970	69		−18.8%
1980	70		1.4%
1990	52		−25.7%
2000	30		−42.3%
2010	15		−50.0%
2020	13		−13.3%
U.S. Decennial Census

=== 2010 census ===
As of the census of 2010, there were 15 people, 10 households, and 3 families residing in the town. The population density was 57.7 inhabitants per square mile (22.3/km^{2}). There were 22 housing units at an average density of 84.6 per square mile (32.7/km^{2}). The racial makeup of the town was 100.0% White.

There were 10 households, of which 10.0% had children under the age of 18 living with them, 30.0% were married couples living together, and 70.0% were non-families. 70.0% of all households were made up of individuals, and 40% had someone living alone who was 65 years of age or older. The average household size was 1.50 and the average family size was 2.67.

The median age in the town was 61.5 years. 13.3% of residents were under the age of 18; 0% were between the ages of 18 and 24; 13.4% were from 25 to 44; 46.8% were from 45 to 64; and 26.7% were 65 years of age or older. The gender makeup of the town was 53.3% male and 46.7% female.

=== 2000 census ===
As of the census of 2000, there were 30 people, 18 households, and 10 families residing in the town. The population density was 110.1 inhabitants per square mile (42.5/km^{2}). There were 25 housing units at an average density of 91.7 per square mile (35.4/km^{2}). The racial makeup of the town was 100.00% White.

There were 18 households, out of which 5.6% had children under the age of 18 living with them, 44.4% were married couples living together, 11.1% had a female householder with no husband present, and 38.9% were non-families. 38.9% of all households were made up of individuals, and 27.8% had someone living alone who was 65 years of age or older. The average household size was 1.67 and the average family size was 2.09.

In the town, the population was spread out, with 3.3% under the age of 18, 13.3% from 25 to 44, 46.7% from 45 to 64, and 36.7% who were 65 years of age or older. The median age was 60 years. For every 100 females, there were 66.7 males. For every 100 females age 18 and over, there were 70.6 males.

The median income for a household in the town was $30,625, and the median income for a family was $40,000. Males had a median income of $26,250 versus $18,750 for females. The per capita income for the town was $18,559. There were no families and 6.9% of the population living below the poverty line, including no under eighteens and 20.0% of those over 64.
