= South Dakota Highway 130 =

State highway in South Dakota, United States

Highway 130

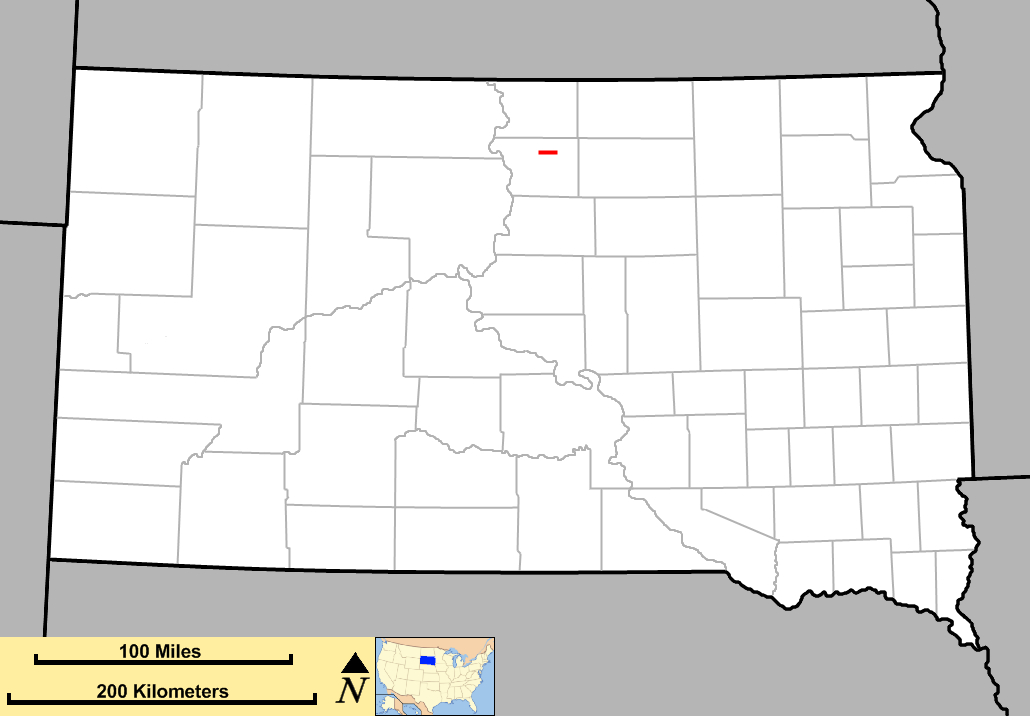
- Route of SD 130 (in red)

Route information
- Maintained by SDDOT
- Length: 7.111 mi (11.444 km)
- Existed: 1976–present

Major junctions
- West end: US 12 / US 83 / SD 20 in Selby
- East end: SD 271 in Java

Location
- Country: United States
- State: South Dakota
- Counties: Walworth

Highway system
- South Dakota State Trunk Highway System; Interstate; US; State
← SD 127	→ SD 134

South Dakota Highway 130 (SD 130) is a 7.111-mile (11.444 km) state highway in Walworth County, South Dakota, United States, that connects the city of Selby with the town of Java.

== Route description ==
SD 130 begins at an intersection with the concurrent highways U.S. Route 12 (US 12), US 83, and SD 20 in Selby. It travels in a due eastward direction, with the exception of a northward curve around some railroad tracks through open fields for its entire length, and comes to an end at SD 271 in Java. It utilizes a portion of 130th Street for its path.

== History ==
SD 130 was designated in 1976 as a redesignation of SD 103.

== Major intersections ==
The entire route is in Walworth County.

Location	mi	km	Destinations	Notes
Selby	0.000	0.000	US 12 / US 83 / SD 20 (370th Avenue) / 130th Street	Western terminus
Java	7.111	11.444	SD 271 (314th Avenue) – US 12, SD 10	Eastern terminus
1.000 mi = 1.609 km; 1.000 km = 0.621 mi

== See also ==
- List of state highways in South Dakota
