= South Dakota Highway 65 =

Highway in South Dakota

Highway 65

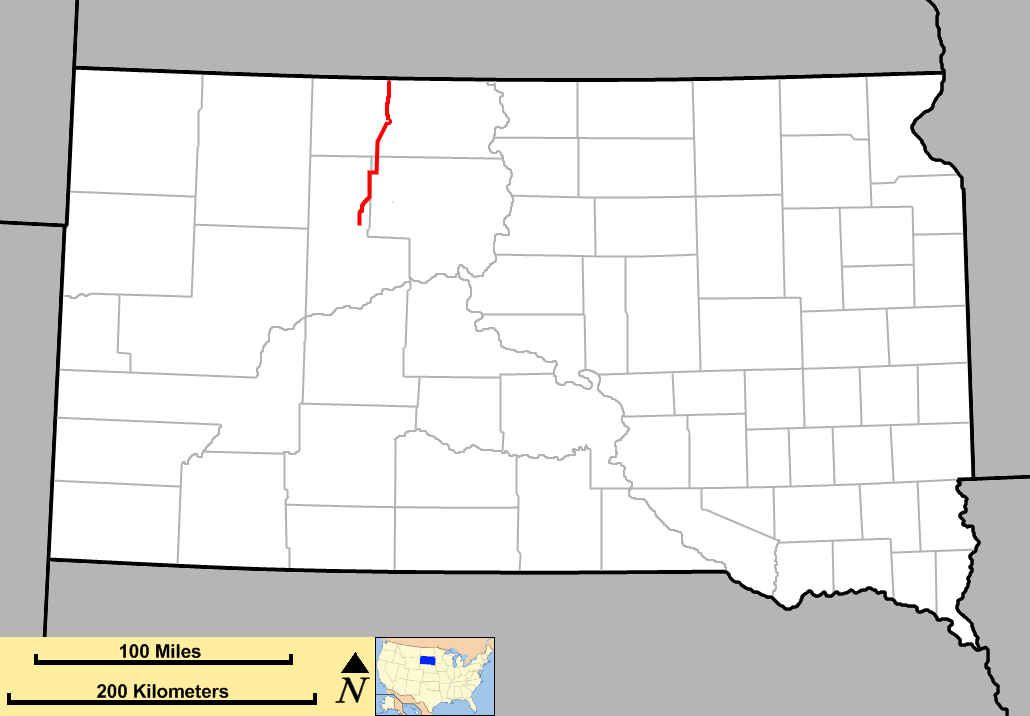
- Route of SD 65 (in red)

Route information
- Maintained by SDDOT
- Length: 70.485 mi (113.435 km)
- Existed: 1926–present

Major junctions
- South end: US 212 east of Dupree
- SD 20 in Isabel; US 12 in McIntosh
- North end: ND 31 in McIntosh

Location
- Country: United States
- State: South Dakota
- Counties: Ziebach, Dewey, Corson

Highway system
- South Dakota State Trunk Highway System; Interstate; US; State
← SD 63	→ SD 71

South Dakota Highway 65 (SD 65) is a state route in north-central region of the U.S. state of South Dakota. It begins at U.S. Highway 212 east of Dupree, then runs northerly to the North Dakota border near McIntosh, where it continues as North Dakota Highway 31. It is about 68 miles (109 km) in length.

== History ==
When first designated in the 1920s, South Dakota 65 consisted of three segments, one stretching from the North Dakota border to the Grand River, one from an intersection with South Dakota Highway 18 in Isabel to an intersection with US 212 in Dupree, and the final segment stretching from US 16 in Kadoka to the Nebraska border south of Martin.

Construction of a new road led to the connection of the two northern segments by 1932. The segment south of US 16 was re-designated as an extension of South Dakota Highway 63 in 1929.

== Major intersections ==
County	Location	mi	km	Destinations	Notes
Ziebach		0.000	0.000	US 212 – Dupree, Eagle Butte	
Ziebach–Dewey county line		25.190	40.539	SD 20 west – Glad Valley	Southern end of SD 20 concurrency
Dewey	Isabel	28.670	46.140	SD 20 east – Timber Lake	Northern end of SD 20 concurrency
Corson		66.054	106.304	US 12 east – McLaughlin	Southern end of US 12 concurrency
Corson		69.560	111.946	US 12 west – Lemmon	Northern end of US 12 concurrency
Corson		70.845	114.014	ND 31 north – Raleigh, Mandan	Continuation into North Dakota
1.000 mi = 1.609 km; 1.000 km = 0.621 mi: Concurrency terminus

== Legal definition ==
The route of SD 65 is defined in South Dakota Codified Laws § 31-4-174.
