= Lowry, South Dakota =

Lowry
- Town
- Lowry, South Dakota
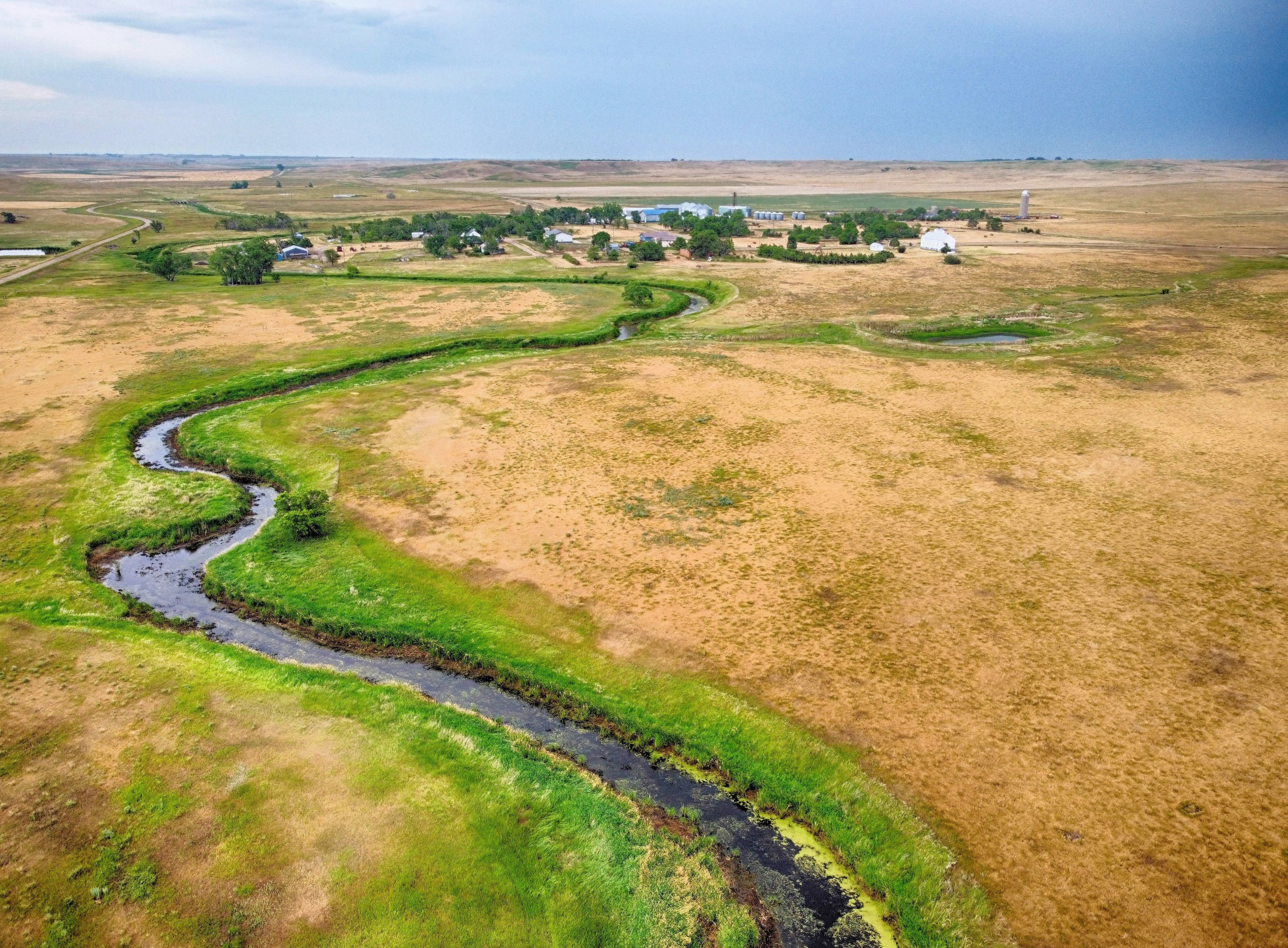

- Location in Walworth County and the state of South Dakota
- Coordinates: 45°18′56″N 99°58′52″W
- Country: United States
- State: South Dakota
- County: Walworth

Area
  - Total: 0.25 sq mi (0.66 km^{2})
  - Land: 0.25 sq mi (0.66 km^{2})
  - Water: 0 sq mi (0.00 km^{2})
- Elevation: 1,864 ft (568 m)

Population (2020)
  - Total: 10
  - Density: 39.5/sq mi (15.27/km^{2})
- Time zone: UTC-6 (Central (CST))
  - Summer (DST): UTC-5 (CDT)
- ZIP code: 57472
- Area code: 605
- FIPS code: 46-39260
- GNIS feature ID: 1267465

Lowry is a town in Walworth County, South Dakota, United States. The population was 10 at the 2020 census. The town is home to Lowry Pilgrim Community Church, Swan Creek Harness Shop, J & C Repair, Karst Service (closed in August 2015) and a fire station. Lowry also has an abandoned school, and a post office, which closed to service in the early 1970s.

Lowry was founded in 1907 as a station stop on a branch line of the Minneapolis and St. Louis Railway built that year between Conde and LeBeau, South Dakota. The town was named in honor of a railroad employee. Railway service to Lowry ended in 1940.

In the 2024 census estimates, Lowry ties with Verdon and Butler as the second least populous municipality in South Dakota with 6 people.

== Geography ==
According to the United States Census Bureau, the town has a total area of 0.25 square miles (0.65 km^{2}), all land.

== Demographics ==
Historical population
Census	Pop.	Note	%±
1910	90		—
1930	89		—
1940	90		1.1%
1950	70		−22.2%
1960	44		−37.1%
1970	35		−20.5%
1980	22		−37.1%
1990	15		−31.8%
2000	10		−33.3%
2010	6		−40.0%
2020	10		66.7%
U.S. Decennial Census; 2013 Estimate

=== 2010 census ===
As of the census of 2010, there were 6 people, 3 households, and 3 families residing in the town. The population density was 24.0 inhabitants per square mile (9.3/km^{2}). There were 6 housing units at an average density of 24.0 per square mile (9.3/km^{2}). The racial makeup of the town was 83.3% White and 16.7% Native American.

There were 3 households, of which 100.0% were married couples living together. 0.0% of all households were made up of individuals. The average household size was 2.00 and the average family size was 2.00.

The median age in the town was 71.5 years. 0.0% of residents were under the age of 18; 0.0% were between the ages of 18 and 24; 0.0% were from 25 to 44; 33.3% were from 45 to 64; and 66.7% were 65 years of age or older. The gender makeup of the town was 50.0% male and 50.0% female.

=== 2000 census ===
As of the census of 2000, there were 10 people, 5 households, and 4 families residing in the town. The population density was 41.6 inhabitants per square mile (16.1/km^{2}). There were 6 housing units at an average density of 24.9 per square mile (9.7/km^{2}). The racial makeup of the town was 100.00% White.

There were 5 households, out of which 1 had children under the age of 18 living with them, 4 were married couples living together, none had a female householder with no husband present, and 1 was a non-family. One household was made up of individuals, and one had someone living alone who was 65 years of age or older. The average household size was two people and the average family size was 2.25 people.

In the town, the population was spread out, with 1 person under the age of 18, two from 18 to 24, none from 25 to 44, four from 45 to 64, and three who were 65 years of age or older. The median age was 53 years. There were an equal number of females and males. For every 100 females age 18 and over, there were 125.0 males.

The median income for a household in the town was $23,750, and the median income for a family was $43,750. Males had a median income of $0, as did females. The per capita income for the town was $18,570. Two people but no families were below the poverty line. Out of the total population, none of those under the age of 18 and 33.3% of those 65 and older were living below the poverty line.
