= Walter L. Zabel =

American politician

Member of the South Dakota House of Representatives
- In office 1979–1990

Personal details
- Born: October 24, 1914 Selby, South Dakota, U.S.
- Died: October 29, 2007 (aged 93)
- Party: Republican

Walter L. Zabel (October 24, 1914 – October 29, 2007) was an American politician. He served as a Republican member of the South Dakota House of Representatives.

== Life and career ==
Zabel was born in Selby, South Dakota.

Zabel served in the South Dakota House of Representatives from 1979 to 1990.

Zabel died on October 29, 2007, at the age of 93.
