= LeBeau, South Dakota =

Coordinates: 45.30550°N 100.30040°W

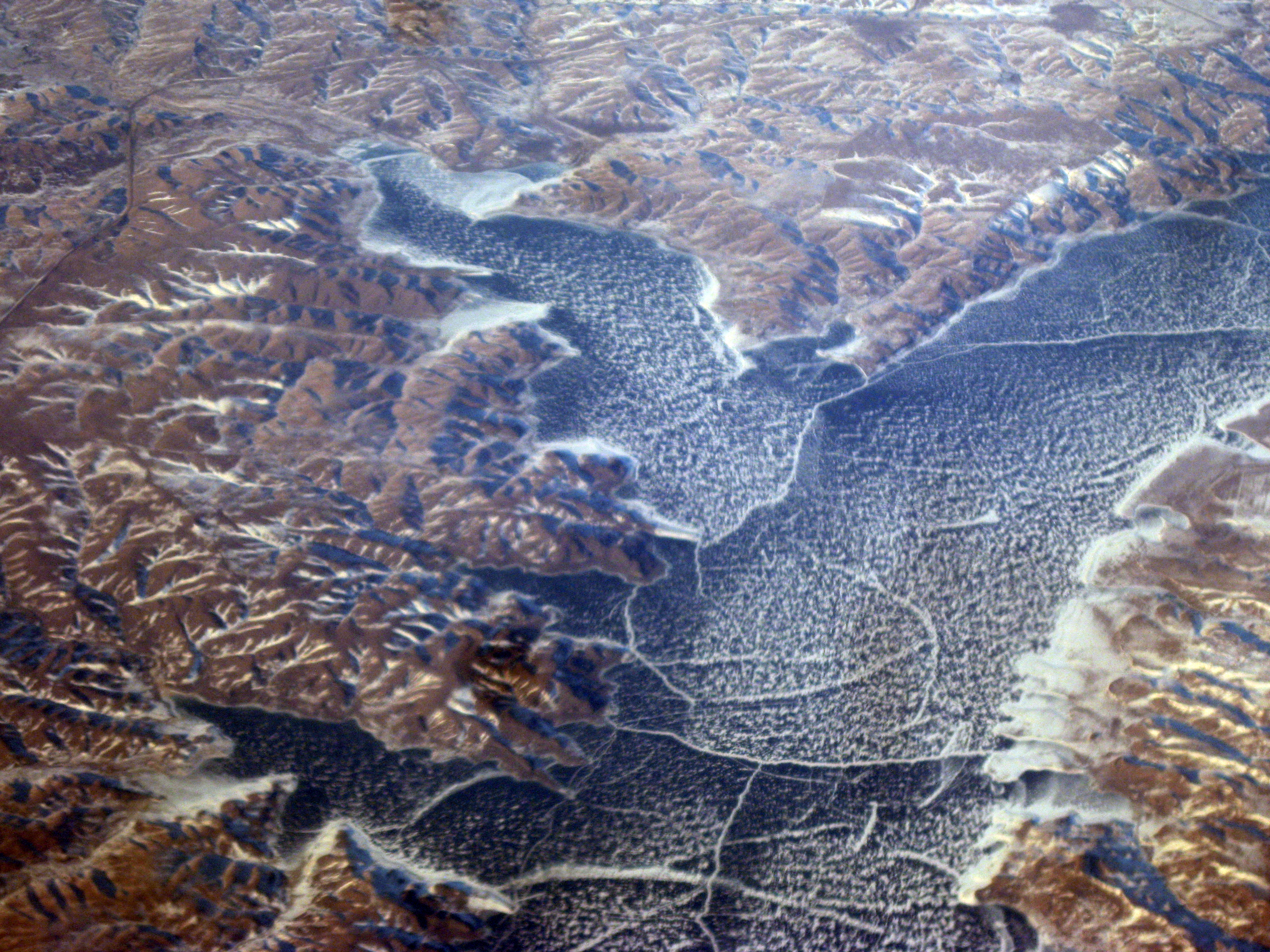
The lake that submerged the town.

LeBeau was a town in Walworth County, South Dakota, United States. It was on the east bank of the Missouri River, near the mouth of Swan Creek.

== History ==
LeBeau was the terminus of a branch line of the Minneapolis and St. Louis Railway (M&StL) built westward in 1907 from Conde, South Dakota. For a time, LeBeau was a boom town, and a major cattle-shipping point for the large ranches on the opposite side of the Missouri. The M&StL planned to continue building its line westward from LeBeau, and began initial work on a Missouri River bridge there. Those expansion plans never materialized, however, and LeBeau quickly went into decline after the competing Chicago, Milwaukee, St. Paul and Pacific Railroad completed its own lines into the region west of the river. The M&StL trackage to LeBeau was removed in 1924.

In the summers of 1954 and 1955 the University of South Dakota fielded an archeological dig under the leadership of Dr. Wesley Hurt. They excavated a large earth lodge complex next to the old town of LeBeau. One of the student diggers, Tyler Bastian, spent weekends excavating in the cellar pits of LeBeau. Bastian went on to get his Ph.D. and become state archeologist for Maryland. LeBeau at that time was located on the ranch of Dean Boehmer.

The former LeBeau townsite is now beneath the waters of Lake Oahe.

== See also ==
- List of ghost towns in South Dakota
