= McIntosh, South Dakota =

McIntosh Maktáža (Lakota)
- City
- Location within Corson County and South Dakota
- Coordinates: 45°55′17″N 101°20′57″W
- Country: United States
- State: South Dakota
- County: Corson

Area
  - Total: 0.77 sq mi (1.99 km^{2})
  - Land: 0.73 sq mi (1.89 km^{2})
  - Water: 0.039 sq mi (0.10 km^{2})
- Elevation: 2,310 ft (700 m)

Population (2020)
  - Total: 111
  - Density: 152.1/sq mi (58.74/km^{2})
- Time zone: UTC−7 (Mountain (MST))
  - Summer (DST): UTC−6 (MDT)
- ZIP code: 57641
- Area code: 605
- FIPS code: 46-39940
- GNIS ID: 1267467

McIntosh (Lakota: Maktáža) is a city in and the county seat of Corson County, South Dakota, United States. The population was 173 at the 2010 census and 111 at the 2020 United States Census.

== History ==
McIntosh was named for a sibling duo who worked for the railroad. The town was established in 1909.

McIntosh was the site of a Cold War era radar station. On April 1, 2006, the wood-frame courthouse burned to the ground. Twenty-five year old Dwight Crigger, an employee of the local weed and pest board, was arrested for the setting the fire. It was the last wood courthouse in use in South Dakota.

== Geography ==
According to the United States Census Bureau, the city has a total area of 0.77 square miles (1.99 km^{2}), of which 0.73 square miles (1.89 km^{2}) is land and 0.04 square miles (0.10 km^{2}) is water. McIntosh has been assigned the ZIP code 57641 and the FIPS place code 39940.

McIntosh is located on US Route 12 and a mile west of the junction with South Dakota Highway 65. It is also a mile west of East (McIntosh) Lake, a lake created by the railroad bed.

=== Climate ===
McIntosh holds the record for the coldest record temperature in South Dakota (−58 °F or −50 °C), set February 17, 1936.

That same year, McIntosh set its own record for highest temperature (114 °F or 45.6 °C) that stands to this day.

Climate data for McIntosh 6 SE, South Dakota (1991−2020 normals, extremes 1915−present)
Month	Jan	Feb	Mar	Apr	May	Jun	Jul	Aug	Sep	Oct	Nov	Dec	Year
Record high °F (°C)	68 (20)	71 (22)	83 (28)	96 (36)	105 (41)	111 (44)	114 (46)	110 (43)	104 (40)	94 (34)	80 (27)	69 (21)	114 (46)
Mean daily maximum °F (°C)	26.0 (−3.3)	30.2 (−1.0)	43.2 (6.2)	57.1 (13.9)	68.8 (20.4)	78.7 (25.9)	86.0 (30.0)	85.1 (29.5)	75.3 (24.1)	58.5 (14.7)	41.9 (5.5)	29.8 (−1.2)	56.7 (13.7)
Daily mean °F (°C)	16.5 (−8.6)	20.6 (−6.3)	32.3 (0.2)	44.7 (7.1)	56.1 (13.4)	65.9 (18.8)	72.2 (22.3)	71.0 (21.7)	61.5 (16.4)	46.6 (8.1)	31.6 (−0.2)	20.5 (−6.4)	45.0 (7.2)
Mean daily minimum °F (°C)	7.1 (−13.8)	11.0 (−11.7)	21.3 (−5.9)	32.2 (0.1)	43.4 (6.3)	53.1 (11.7)	58.4 (14.7)	57.0 (13.9)	47.7 (8.7)	34.7 (1.5)	21.3 (−5.9)	11.1 (−11.6)	33.2 (0.7)
Record low °F (°C)	−44 (−42)	−58 (−50)	−33 (−36)	−6 (−21)	14 (−10)	23 (−5)	32 (0)	28 (−2)	10 (−12)	−13 (−25)	−19 (−28)	−40 (−40)	−58 (−50)
Average precipitation inches (mm)	0.41 (10)	0.52 (13)	0.67 (17)	1.37 (35)	2.44 (62)	3.48 (88)	2.68 (68)	1.93 (49)	1.45 (37)	1.46 (37)	0.47 (12)	0.42 (11)	17.30 (439)
Average snowfall inches (cm)	7.2 (18)	8.2 (21)	7.4 (19)	4.9 (12)	0.6 (1.5)	0.0 (0.0)	0.0 (0.0)	0.0 (0.0)	0.0 (0.0)	2.6 (6.6)	5.0 (13)	7.4 (19)	43.3 (110)
Average precipitation days (≥ 0.01 in)	4.7	5.2	5.3	6.6	8.7	9.8	8.8	6.5	5.7	6.0	4.3	4.5	76.1
Average snowy days (≥ 0.1 in)	4.1	4.6	3.7	1.8	0.2	0.0	0.0	0.0	0.0	1.1	2.8	4.0	22.3
Source: NOAA

Historical population
Census	Pop.	Note	%±
1910	409		—
1920	727		77.8%
1930	663		−8.8%
1940	626		−5.6%
1950	628		0.3%
1960	568		−9.6%
1970	563		−0.9%
1980	418		−25.8%
1990	302		−27.8%
2000	217		−28.1%
2010	173		−20.3%
2020	111		−35.8%
U.S. Decennial Census

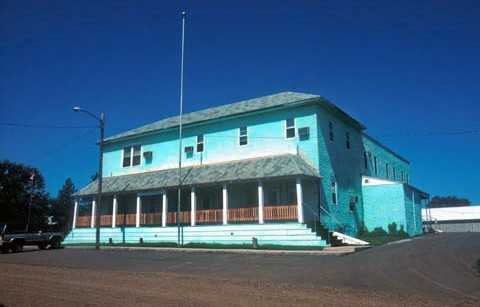
Corson County Courthouse in McIntosh in 1993. This building was destroyed by fire on April 10, 2006.

== Demographics ==
=== 2020 census ===
As of the 2020 census, McIntosh had a population of 111. The median age was 51.8 years. 16.2% of residents were under the age of 18 and 31.5% of residents were 65 years of age or older. For every 100 females there were 131.2 males, and for every 100 females age 18 and over there were 116.3 males age 18 and over.

0.0% of residents lived in urban areas, while 100.0% lived in rural areas.

There were 58 households in McIntosh, of which 13.8% had children under the age of 18 living in them. Of all households, 44.8% were married-couple households, 24.1% were households with a male householder and no spouse or partner present, and 24.1% were households with a female householder and no spouse or partner present. About 44.8% of all households were made up of individuals and 18.9% had someone living alone who was 65 years of age or older.

There were 85 housing units, of which 31.8% were vacant. The homeowner vacancy rate was 4.9% and the rental vacancy rate was 5.0%.

Racial composition as of the 2020 census
Race	Number	Percent
White	62	55.9%
Black or African American	0	0.0%
American Indian and Alaska Native	35	31.5%
Asian	7	6.3%
Native Hawaiian and Other Pacific Islander	0	0.0%
Some other race	0	0.0%
Two or more races	7	6.3%
Hispanic or Latino (of any race)	0	0.0%

=== 2010 census ===
As of the census of 2010, there were 173 people. The city had 84 households, and 49 families residing in the city. Between 2000 and 2010, the city's population declined by 20%. The population density was 237.0 inhabitants per square mile (91.5/km^{2}). There were 111 housing units at an average density of 152.1 per square mile (58.7/km^{2}).

Racially, the city is 76.301% White people, 19.075% Native Americans, 2.312% Hispanic or Latino descent, 0.578% Asian, and 1.734% from other races.

There were 84 households, of which 21 households had children under the age of 18 living with them, 34 households were married couples living together, 5 households had a female householder with no husband present, 5 households had a male householder with no wife present, and 35 households were non-families. 34 households were made up of individuals. 20 households had someone living alone who was 65 years of age or older. The average household size was 2.06 and the average family size was 2.65.

The median age in the city was 50.8 years, 39 residents were under the age of 18, 5 residents were between the ages of 18 and 24, 32 residents were between the ages of 25 and 44, 49 residents were between the ages of 45 and 64, and 48 residents were 65 years of age or older. The gender makeup of the city was 49.7% male and 50.3% female.

== See also ==
- List of cities in South Dakota
