= Walworth County, South Dakota =

County in South Dakota, United States

- County
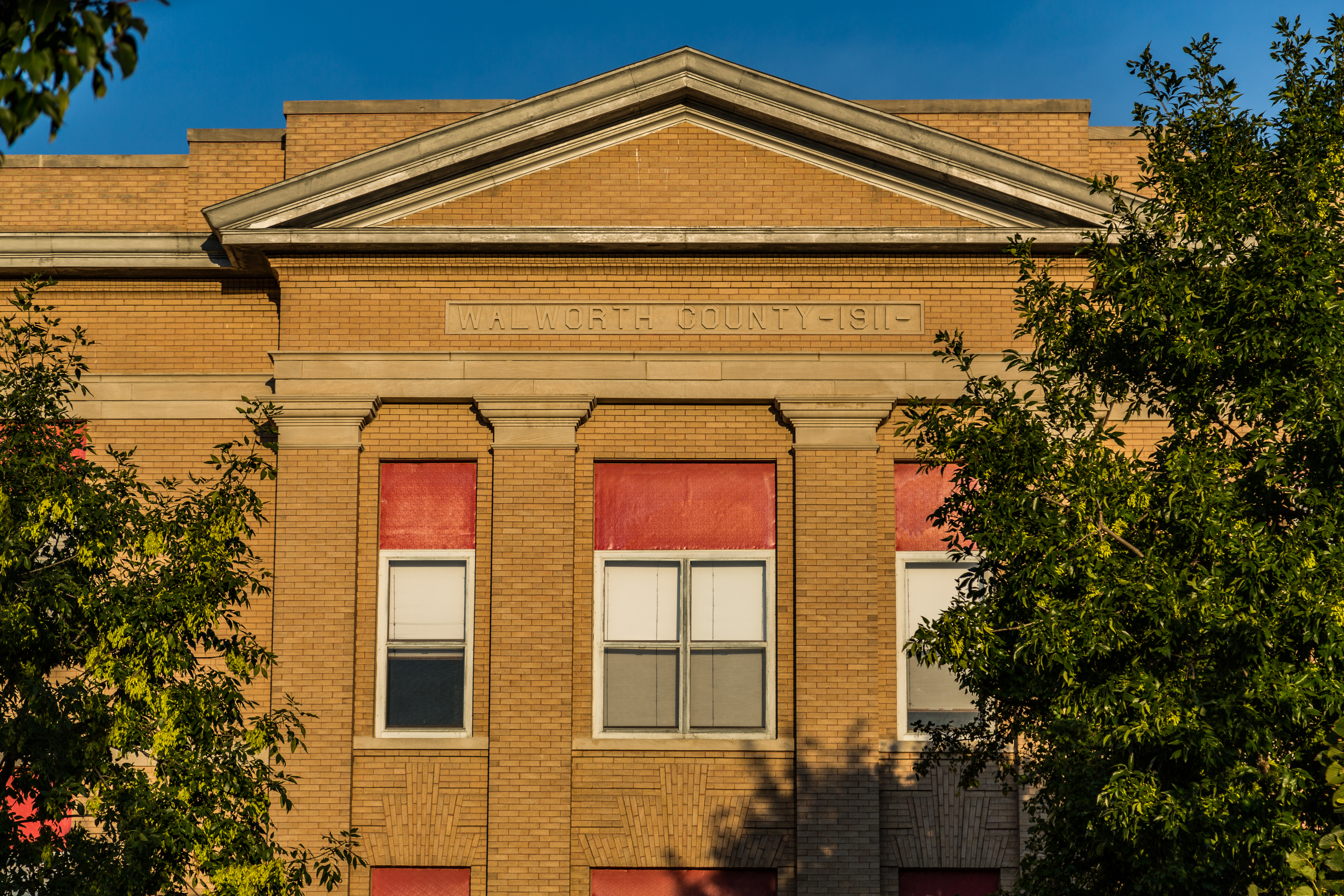
- Walworth County Courthouse, Selby

- Location within the U.S. state of South Dakota
- Coordinates: 45°26′N 100°02′W
- Country: United States
- State: South Dakota
- Created: 1873
- Organized: 1883
- Named for: Walworth County, Wisconsin
- Seat: Selby
- Largest city: Mobridge

Area
  - Total: 745 sq mi (1,930 km^{2})
  - Land: 709 sq mi (1,840 km^{2})
  - Water: 36 sq mi (93 km^{2}) 4.8%

Population (2020)
  - Total: 5,315
  - Estimate (2025): 5,217 ▼
  - Density: 7.50/sq mi (2.89/km^{2})
- Time zone: UTC−6 (Central)
  - Summer (DST): UTC−5 (CDT)
- Congressional district: At-large
- Website: walworthco.org

Walworth County is a county in the U.S. state of South Dakota. As of the 2020 census, the population was 5,315. Its county seat is Selby. The county was created in 1873 and organized in 1883. It is named for Walworth County, Wisconsin.

The Missouri River flows southward along the county's west boundary line. Swan Creek flows west-northwest through the county's SW corner, discharging into the Missouri. The county's terrain consists of semi-arid rolling hills, carved by drainages and gullies. Most of the area is devoted to agriculture. The terrain slopes to the south and east, although the western portion of the county drops westward into the Missouri River valley. The county's highest point is on the eastern portion of its north boundary line, at 1,982 ft (604 m) ASL. The county has a total area of 745 square miles (1,930 km^{2}), of which 709 square miles (1,840 km^{2}) is land and 36 square miles (93 km^{2}) (4.8%) is water.

The eastern portion of South Dakota's counties (48 of 66) observe Central Time; the western counties (18 of 66) observe Mountain Time. Walworth County is the westernmost of the SD counties to observe Central Time.

== Major highways ==
- U.S. Highway 12
- U.S. Highway 83
- South Dakota Highway 20
- South Dakota Highway 47
- South Dakota Highway 130
- South Dakota Highway 144
- South Dakota Highway 271
- South Dakota Highway 1804

=== Adjacent counties ===
- Campbell County – north
- McPherson County – northeast
- Edmunds County – east
- Potter County – south
- Dewey County – southwest (observes Mountain Time)
- Corson County – northwest (observes Mountain Time)

=== Protected areas ===
- Blue Blanket Lake State Game Production Area
- Bowdle Beach State Lakeside Use Area
- Indian Creek State Recreation Area
- Lake Hiddenwood State Recreation Area
- LeBeau State Lakeside Use Area
- Oahe Blue Blanket State Game Production Area
- Revheim Bay Recreation Area
- Spring Lake State Game Production Area
- Swan Creek State Game Production Area
- Swan Creek State Recreation Area
- Swan Lake State Game Production Area
- Thomas Bay State Lakeside Use Area
- Walth Bay State Game Production Area
- Walth Bay State Lakeside Use Area

=== Lakes ===
- Horseshoe Lake
- Lake Hiddenwood
- Lake Oahe (part)
- Molsted Lake
- Spring Lake
- Swan Lake

== Demographics ==
Historical population
Census	Pop.	Note	%±
1880	46		—
1890	2,153		4,580.4%
1900	3,839		78.3%
1910	6,488		69.0%
1920	8,447		30.2%
1930	8,791		4.1%
1940	7,274		−17.3%
1950	7,648		5.1%
1960	8,097		5.9%
1970	7,842		−3.1%
1980	7,011		−10.6%
1990	6,087		−13.2%
2000	5,974		−1.9%
2010	5,438		−9.0%
2020	5,315		−2.3%
2025 (est.)	5,217	▼	−1.8%
U.S. Decennial Census; 1790–1960 1900–1990; 1990–2000 2010–2020

=== 2020 census ===
As of the 2020 census, there were 5,315 people, 2,271 households, and 1,400 families in the county. Of the residents, 22.9% were under the age of 18 and 24.8% were 65 years of age or older; the median age was 43.7 years. For every 100 females there were 97.6 males, and for every 100 females age 18 and over there were 96.4 males. The population density was 7.5 inhabitants per square mile (2.9/km^{2}).

The racial makeup of the county was 77.9% White, 0.2% Black or African American, 15.2% American Indian and Alaska Native, 0.3% Asian, 0.4% from some other race, and 6.0% from two or more races. Hispanic or Latino residents of any race comprised 1.9% of the population.

There were 2,271 households in the county, of which 25.7% had children under the age of 18 living with them and 25.7% had a female householder with no spouse or partner present. About 33.5% of all households were made up of individuals and 17.6% had someone living alone who was 65 years of age or older.

There were 2,927 housing units, of which 22.4% were vacant. Among occupied housing units, 71.4% were owner-occupied and 28.6% were renter-occupied. The homeowner vacancy rate was 2.4% and the rental vacancy rate was 10.7%.

=== 2010 census ===
As of the 2010 census, there were 5,438 people, 2,392 households, and 1,490 families in the county. The population density was 7.7 inhabitants per square mile (3.0/km^{2}). There were 3,003 housing units at an average density of 4.2 units per square mile (1.6 units/km^{2}). The racial makeup of the county was 82.6% white, 14.3% American Indian, 0.2% Asian, 0.1% black or African American, 0.2% from other races, and 2.6% from two or more races. Those of Hispanic or Latino origin made up 0.7% of the population. In terms of ancestry, 56.9% were German, 12.5% were Norwegian, 8.9% were Russian, 5.4% were Irish, and 3.1% were American.

Of the 2,392 households, 25.9% had children under the age of 18 living with them, 49.2% were married couples living together, 8.9% had a female householder with no husband present, 37.7% were non-families, and 32.8% of all households were made up of individuals. The average household size was 2.21 and the average family size was 2.79. The median age was 47.2 years.

The median income for a household in the county was $39,517 and the median income for a family was $51,250. Males had a median income of $37,857 versus $21,551 for females. The per capita income for the county was $23,716. About 7.5% of families and 14.5% of the population were below the poverty line, including 23.6% of those under age 18 and 14.4% of those age 65 or over.

== Communities ==
=== Cities ===
- Mobridge
- Selby (county seat)

=== Towns ===
- Akaska (Population: 77)
- Glenham (Population: 112)
- Java (Population: 121)
- Lowry (Population: 10)

=== Unincorporated community ===
- Sitka

=== Unorganized territories ===
- West Walworth
- East Walworth

== Politics ==
Walworth County voters have been reliably Republican for decades. Only three Democratic presidential candidates have ever carried the county: William Jennings Bryan in 1896, Franklin D. Roosevelt in 1932 and 1936, and Lyndon Johnson in 1964.

United States presidential election results for Walworth County, South Dakota
Year	Republican		Democratic		Third party(ies)	
Year	No.	%	No.	%	No.	%
1892	187	44.21%	45	10.64%	191	45.15%
1896	250	46.21%	286	52.87%	5	0.92%
1900	478	61.92%	282	36.53%	12	1.55%
1904	654	76.05%	176	20.47%	30	3.49%
1908	825	67.96%	351	28.91%	38	3.13%
1912	0	0.00%	451	40.23%	670	59.77%
1916	761	55.03%	590	42.66%	32	2.31%
1920	1,411	61.40%	478	20.80%	409	17.80%
1924	1,033	44.15%	114	4.87%	1,193	50.98%
1928	1,854	59.96%	1,216	39.33%	22	0.71%
1932	1,049	31.60%	2,221	66.90%	50	1.51%
1936	1,420	38.73%	2,212	60.34%	34	0.93%
1940	1,921	55.11%	1,565	44.89%	0	0.00%
1944	1,533	55.64%	1,222	44.36%	0	0.00%
1948	1,607	50.94%	1,513	47.96%	35	1.11%
1952	2,369	65.24%	1,262	34.76%	0	0.00%
1956	2,132	60.21%	1,409	39.79%	0	0.00%
1960	2,406	62.11%	1,468	37.89%	0	0.00%
1964	1,849	48.65%	1,952	51.35%	0	0.00%
1968	2,204	60.19%	1,276	34.84%	182	4.97%
1972	2,416	65.10%	1,287	34.68%	8	0.22%
1976	2,187	58.66%	1,516	40.67%	25	0.67%
1980	2,675	74.55%	753	20.99%	160	4.46%
1984	2,396	75.02%	779	24.39%	19	0.59%
1988	1,940	63.40%	1,094	35.75%	26	0.85%
1992	1,439	49.48%	829	28.51%	640	22.01%
1996	1,461	52.38%	939	33.67%	389	13.95%
2000	1,758	68.86%	721	28.24%	74	2.90%
2004	1,967	68.30%	878	30.49%	35	1.22%
2008	1,668	62.94%	923	34.83%	59	2.23%
2012	1,731	70.31%	671	27.25%	60	2.44%
2016	1,896	76.54%	457	18.45%	124	5.01%
2020	1,966	76.20%	565	21.90%	49	1.90%
2024	1,940	78.67%	481	19.51%	45	1.82%

== Education ==
School districts include:

- Bowdle School District 22-1
- Hoven School District 53-2
- Mobridge-Pollock School District 62-6
- Selby School District 62-5

== See also ==
- National Register of Historic Places listings in Walworth County, South Dakota
