= Punished Woman Lake =

Lake in the state of South Dakota, United States

- Wíƞyaƞ Kaṡtakapi Bde (Dakota)
- Location within South Dakota
- Location: Codington County, South Dakota
- Coordinates: 45°06′40.2″N 96°56′14.2″W
- Type: glacial lake
- Basin countries: United States
- Surface area: 477 acres (193 ha)
- Average depth: 12 ft (3.7 m)
- Shore length^{1}: 4.5 mi (7.2 km)
- Surface elevation: 1,841 ft (561 m)
- ^{1} Shore length is not a well-defined measure.

Punished Woman Lake is a natural glacial lake in northeastern South Dakota. It is located in Codington County, and borders the town of South Shore. The lake's surface area is 477 acres (193 ha), with approximately 4.5 miles (7.2 km) of shoreline. The average water depth is around 12 feet (3.7 m).

Punished Woman Lake is managed by the South Dakota Game, Fish, and Parks (SDGFP) agency as a fishery for northern pike and yellow perch. The lake is also inhabited by black bullhead, common carp, golden shiner, walleye, and white suckerfish. Due to the lake's shallow waters, fish kills during extreme summer or winter temperatures are not unusual, and the SDGFP re-stocks the lake's primary species as needed.

== Legend ==
Punished Woman Lake is named for a Dakota legend that tells of a young woman who ran away with her forbidden lover, defying her father's wishes for her to marry a much older clan chief. When the woman and her lover were returned to the tribe's camp along the lake's shore, the enraged chief killed them both, only to be struck down soon after by a bolt of lightning from a clear sky. The traditional Dakota language name for the lake is Wíƞyaƞ Kaṡtakapi Bde, which can be translated as "Lake where a woman was beaten".

== See also ==
- List of lakes in South Dakota
