= Reva, South Dakota =

- Unincorporated community
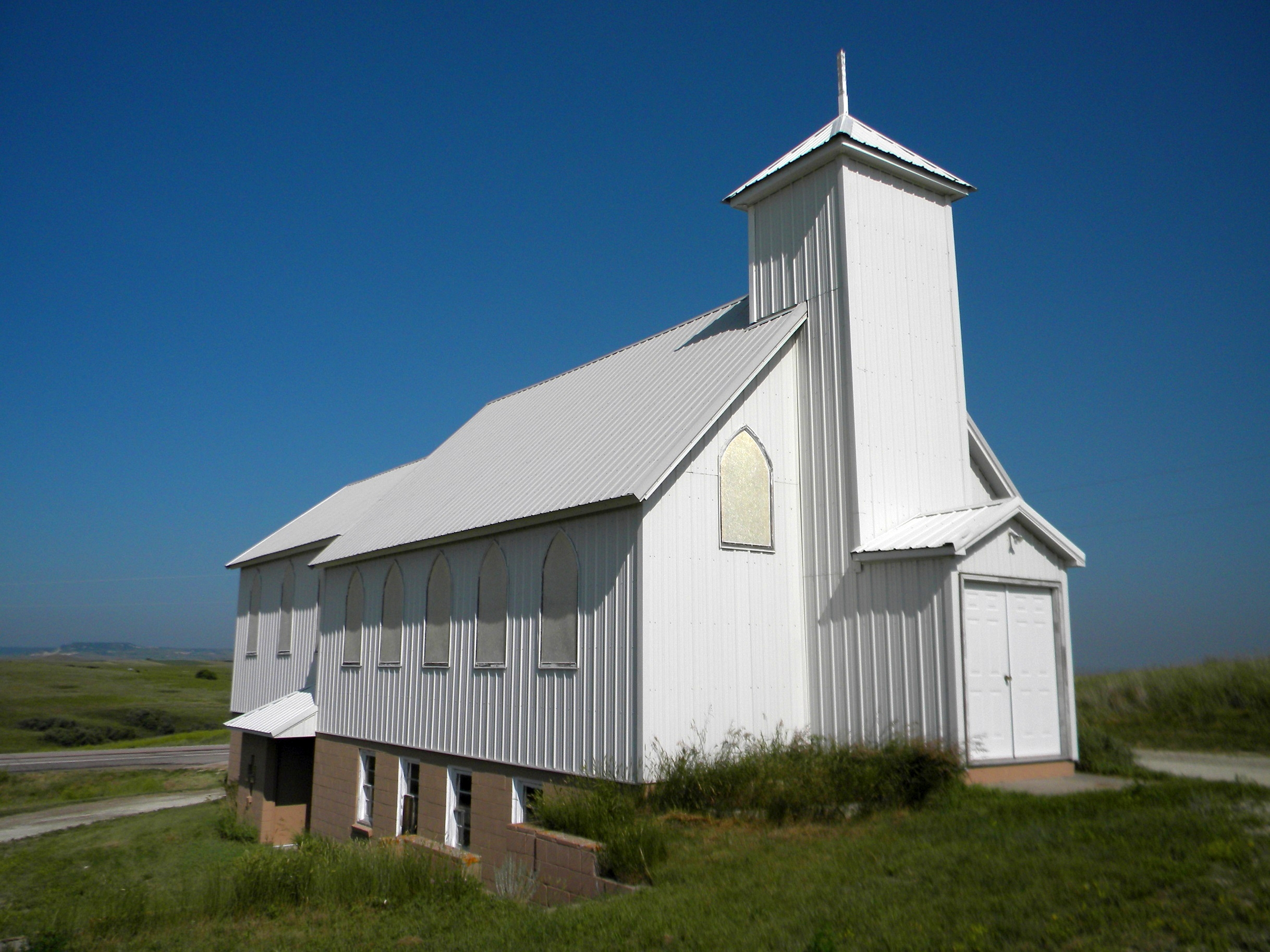
- Our Lady of the Prairie Catholic Church

- Location within South Dakota Location within the United States
- Coordinates: 45°32′43″N 103°5′2″W
- Country: United States
- State: South Dakota
- County: Harding
- Elevation: 3,054 ft (931 m)
- Time zone: UTC-6 (Mountain (MST))
  - Summer (DST): UTC-5 (MDT)
- ZIP codes: 57651
- GNIS feature ID: 1257361

Reva is an unincorporated community in Harding County, South Dakota, United States. Although not tracked by the Census Bureau, Reva has been assigned the ZIP code of 57651.

The community has the name of Reva Bonniwell, the daughter of a first settler. It is the location of the annual Reva Turtle Races.

== History ==
The Battle of Slim Buttes occurred here on September 9–10, 1876, in the Great Sioux Reservation between the United States Army and Miniconjou Sioux during the Great Sioux War of 1876. It marked the first significant victory for the Army since the stunning defeat of General George Custer at the Battle of Little Bighorn in June.

One hundred fifty troopers led by Captain Anson Mills from the 3rd U.S. Cavalry surrounded the village of thirty-seven lodges and attacked it the next morning, shooting anyone who resisted. Taken by surprise, the Native Americans fled, with a mortally wounded Chief American Horse the elder and fifteen women and children hiding in a nearby ravine/draw. Having refused treatment by the army surgeons after surrendering, American Horse eventually lost his life, as well as two women and one child. One tribal boy was found alive in the village, having slept through the initial fighting. Those Sioux who escaped spread the word to neighboring Sans Arc, Brulé and Cheyenne villages, telling Crazy Horse and other leaders that they had encountered 100-150 soldiers. Unknown to them, Crook's main column of infantry, artillery, and other cavalry had their arrival.
