= Glenham, South Dakota =

- Town
- Location in Walworth County and the state of South Dakota
- Coordinates: 45°31′59″N 100°16′16″W
- Country: United States
- State: South Dakota
- County: Walworth
- Incorporated: 1907

Area
  - Total: 0.33 sq mi (0.85 km^{2})
  - Land: 0.33 sq mi (0.85 km^{2})
  - Water: 0 sq mi (0.00 km^{2})
- Elevation: 1,686 ft (514 m)

Population (2020)
  - Total: 112
  - Density: 342.9/sq mi (132.38/km^{2})
- Time zone: UTC-6 (Central (CST))
  - Summer (DST): UTC-5 (CDT)
- ZIP code: 57631
- Area code: 605
- FIPS code: 46-24620
- GNIS feature ID: 1267405

Glenham is a town in Walworth County, South Dakota, United States. The population was 112 at the 2020 census.

Glenham was laid out in 1900, and named for a glen near the town site.

== Geography ==
According to the United States Census Bureau, the town has a total area of 0.33 square miles (0.85 km^{2}), all land.

== Demographics ==
Historical population
Census	Pop.	Note	%±
1910	182		—
1920	135		−25.8%
1930	187		38.5%
1940	131		−29.9%
1950	168		28.2%
1960	171		1.8%
1970	178		4.1%
1980	169		−5.1%
1990	134		−20.7%
2000	139		3.7%
2010	105		−24.5%
2020	112		6.7%
U.S. Decennial Census

=== 2010 census ===
As of the census of 2010, there were 105 people, 55 households, and 30 families residing in the town. The population density was 318.2 inhabitants per square mile (122.9/km^{2}). There were 67 housing units at an average density of 203.0 per square mile (78.4/km^{2}). The racial makeup of the town was 95.2% White, 1.9% Native American, 1.9% from other races, and 1.0% from two or more races. Hispanic or Latino of any race were 2.9% of the population.

There were 55 households, of which 10.9% had children under the age of 18 living with them, 47.3% were married couples living together, 5.5% had a female householder with no husband present, 1.8% had a male householder with no wife present, and 45.5% were non-families. 43.6% of all households were made up of individuals, and 18.2% had someone living alone who was 65 years of age or older. The average household size was 1.91 and the average family size was 2.63.

The median age in the town was 53.8 years. 6.7% of residents were under the age of 18; 11.5% were between the ages of 18 and 24; 15.4% were from 25 to 44; 37.2% were from 45 to 64; and 29.5% were 65 years of age or older. The gender makeup of the town was 52.4% male and 47.6% female.

=== 2000 census ===
As of the census of 2000, there were 139 people, 56 households, and 38 families residing in the town. The population density was 425.5 inhabitants per square mile (164.3/km^{2}). There were 69 housing units at an average density of 211.2 per square mile (81.5/km^{2}). The racial makeup of the town was 94.24% White, 0.72% Asian, and 5.04% from two or more races. Hispanic or Latino of any race were 1.44% of the population.

There were 56 households, out of which 26.8% had children under the age of 18 living with them, 55.4% were married couples living together, 10.7% had a female householder with no husband present, and 32.1% were non-families. 32.1% of all households were made up of individuals, and 12.5% had someone living alone who was 65 years of age or older. The average household size was 2.48 and the average family size was 3.16.

In the town, the population was spread out, with 24.5% under the age of 18, 8.6% from 18 to 24, 22.3% from 25 to 44, 23.7% from 45 to 64, and 20.9% who were 65 years of age or older. The median age was 42 years. For every 100 females, there were 110.6 males. For every 100 females age 18 and over, there were 94.4 males.

The median income for a household in the town was $31,125, and the median income for a family was $32,321. Males had a median income of $25,313 versus $17,500 for females. The per capita income for the town was $15,348. There were 9.3% of families and 13.9% of the population living below the poverty line, including 18.2% of under eighteens and none of those over 64.
