= Isabel, South Dakota =

Isabel
- Town
- Location in Dewey County and the state of South Dakota
- Coordinates: 45°23′37″N 101°25′53″W
- Country: United States
- State: South Dakota
- County: Dewey
- Incorporated: 1911

Area
  - Total: 0.85 sq mi (2.19 km^{2})
  - Land: 0.85 sq mi (2.19 km^{2})
  - Water: 0 sq mi (0.00 km^{2})
- Elevation: 2,395 ft (730 m)

Population (2020)
  - Total: 145
  - Density: 171.6/sq mi (66.26/km^{2})
- Time zone: UTC-7 (Mountain (MST))
  - Summer (DST): UTC-6 (MDT)
- ZIP code: 57633
- Area code: 605
- FIPS code: 46-32140
- GNIS feature ID: 1267439

Isabel is a town in Dewey County, South Dakota, United States. The population was 145 at the 2020 census.

Isabel was laid out in 1910, and named in honor of a certain railroad employee's daughter.

== Geography ==
According to the United States Census Bureau, the town has a total area of 0.91 square miles (2.36 km^{2}), all land.

== Demographics ==
Historical population
Census	Pop.	Note	%±
1920	240		—
1930	430		79.2%
1940	490		14.0%
1950	511		4.3%
1960	488		−4.5%
1970	394		−19.3%
1980	332		−15.7%
1990	319		−3.9%
2000	239		−25.1%
2010	135		−43.5%
2020	145		7.4%
U.S. Decennial Census

=== 2010 census ===
As of the census of 2010, there were 135 people, 55 households, and 38 families residing in the town. The population density was 148.4 inhabitants per square mile (57.3/km^{2}). There were 69 housing units at an average density of 75.8 per square mile (29.3/km^{2}). The racial makeup of the town was 75.6% White, 23.0% Native American, and 1.5% from two or more races.

There were 55 households, of which 29.1% had children under the age of 18 living with them, 47.3% were married couples living together, 14.5% had a female householder with no husband present, 7.3% had a male householder with no wife present, and 30.9% were non-families. 27.3% of all households were made up of individuals, and 23.7% had someone living alone who was 65 years of age or older. The average household size was 2.45 and the average family size was 2.95.

The median age in the town was 46.5 years. 20.7% of residents were under the age of 18; 8.9% were between the ages of 18 and 24; 17.8% were from 25 to 44; 24.5% were from 45 to 64; and 28.1% were 65 years of age or older. The gender makeup of the town was 44.4% male and 55.6% female.

=== 2000 census ===
As of the census of 2000, there were 239 people, 89 households, and 59 families residing in the town. The population density was 269.1 inhabitants per square mile (103.9/km^{2}). There were 125 housing units at an average density of 140.7 per square mile (54.3/km^{2}). The racial makeup of the town was 66.1% White, 33.1% Native American, 0.42% Pacific Islander, and 5.4% from two or more races. Hispanic or Latino of any race were 0.42% of the population.

There were 89 households, out of which 34.8% had children under the age of 18 living with them, 49.4% were married couples living together, 10.1% had a female householder with no husband present, and 32.6% were non-families. 31.5% of all households were made up of individuals, and 22.5% had someone living alone who was 65 years of age or older. The average household size was 2.69 and the average family size was 3.38.

In the town, the population was spread out, with 33.9% under the age of 18, 5.4% from 18 to 24, 24.7% from 25 to 44, 16.7% from 45 to 64, and 19.2% who were 65 years of age or older. The median age was 35 years. For every 100 females, there were 91.2 males. For every 100 females age 18 and over, there were 90.4 males.

The median income for a household in the town was $14,643, and the median income for a family was $18,750. Males had a median income of $23,438 versus $18,125 for females. The per capita income for the town was $7,919. About 28.3% of families and 36.8% of the population were below the poverty line, including 52.2% of those under the age of eighteen and 29.0% of those 65 or over.

== Education ==
It is in the Timber Lake School District 20-3.
