= South Shore, South Dakota =

- Town
- Location in Codington County and the state of South Dakota
- Coordinates: 45°06′05″N 96°55′48″W
- Country: United States
- State: South Dakota
- County: Codington
- Incorporated: March 6, 1888

Area
  - Total: 1.40 sq mi (3.62 km^{2})
  - Land: 1.40 sq mi (3.62 km^{2})
  - Water: 0 sq mi (0.00 km^{2})
- Elevation: 1,900 ft (580 m)

Population (2020)
  - Total: 189
  - Density: 135.3/sq mi (52.24/km^{2})
- Time zone: UTC-6 (CST)
  - Summer (DST): UTC-5 (CDT)
- ZIP code: 57263
- Area code: 605
- FIPS code: 46-59940
- GNIS feature ID: 1267579
- Website: www.southshore-sd.com

South Shore is a town in Codington County, South Dakota, United States. The population was 189 at the 2020 census. It is part of the Watertown, South Dakota Micropolitan Statistical Area.

== Geography ==
According to the United States Census Bureau, the town has a total area of 1.40 square miles (3.63 km^{2}), all land.

The town takes its name from its location on Punished Woman Lake.

== Demographics ==
Historical population
Census	Pop.	Note	%±
1910	335		—
1920	305		−9.0%
1930	322		5.6%
1940	296		−8.1%
1950	269		−9.1%
1960	259		−3.7%
1970	199		−23.2%
1980	241		21.1%
1990	260		7.9%
2000	270		3.8%
2010	225		−16.7%
2020	189		−16.0%
2021 (est.)	191	▲	1.1%
U.S. Decennial Census; 2020 Census

=== 2010 census ===
As of the census of 2010, there were 225 people, 99 households, and 56 families residing in the town. The population density was 160.7 inhabitants per square mile (62.0/km^{2}). There were 122 housing units at an average density of 87.1 per square mile (33.6/km^{2}). The racial makeup of the town was 95.1% White, 0.4% African American, 1.8% Native American, and 2.7% from two or more races. Hispanic or Latino of any race were 1.8% of the population.

There were 99 households, of which 29.3% had children under the age of 18 living with them, 44.4% were married couples living together, 6.1% had a female householder with no husband present, 6.1% had a male householder with no wife present, and 43.4% were non-families. 39.4% of all households were made up of individuals, and 10.1% had someone living alone who was 65 years of age or older. The average household size was 2.27 and the average family size was 3.00.

The median age in the town was 39.2 years. 28.4% of residents were under the age of 18; 5.8% were between the ages of 18 and 24; 26.2% were from 25 to 44; 24.8% were from 45 to 64; and 14.7% were 65 years of age or older. The gender makeup of the town was 51.1% male and 48.9% female.

=== 2000 census ===
As of the census of 2000, there were 270 people, 116 households, and 77 families residing in the town. The population density was 193.4 inhabitants per square mile (74.7/km^{2}). There were 131 housing units at an average density of 93.9 per square mile (36.3/km^{2}). The racial makeup of the town was 98.89% White and 1.11% Native American.

There were 116 households, out of which 31.0% had children under the age of 18 living with them, 53.4% were married couples living together, 9.5% had a female householder with no husband present, and 33.6% were non-families. 28.4% of all households were made up of individuals, and 13.8% had someone living alone who was 65 years of age or older. The average household size was 2.33 and the average family size was 2.91.

In the town, the population was spread out, with 25.6% under the age of 18, 8.1% from 18 to 24, 22.6% from 25 to 44, 25.9% from 45 to 64, and 17.8% who were 65 years of age or older. The median age was 41 years. For every 100 females, there were 94.2 males. For every 100 females age 18 and over, there were 99.0 males.

The median income for a household in the town was $28,250, and the median income for a family was $36,875. Males had a median income of $25,313 versus $19,375 for females. The per capita income for the town was $21,341. About 5.1% of families and 7.3% of the population were below the poverty line, including 10.2% of those under the age of eighteen and 9.5% of those 65 or over.

== Education ==
It is in the Waverly School District 14-5.
