= Verdon, South Dakota =

- Town
- Location in Brown County and the state of South Dakota
- Coordinates: 45°14′39″N 98°05′57″W
- Country: United States
- State: South Dakota
- County: Brown
- Incorporated: 1884

Area
  - Total: 0.25 sq mi (0.65 km^{2})
  - Land: 0.25 sq mi (0.65 km^{2})
  - Water: 0 sq mi (0.00 km^{2})
- Elevation: 1,303 ft (397 m)

Population (2020)
  - Total: 3
  - Density: 12/sq mi (4.6/km^{2})
- Time zone: UTC-6 (Central (CST))
  - Summer (DST): UTC-5 (CDT)
- Area code: 605
- FIPS code: 46-66660
- GNIS feature ID: 1267612

Verdon is a town in southeastern Brown County, South Dakota, United States. The population was 3 at the 2020 census. Verdon is the second least populous municipality in South Dakota behind only Hillsview.

== History ==
Verdon was platted in 1886. It was named after the city of Verdun, France. A post office was established at Verdon in 1887, and remained in operation until being discontinued in 1982. Verdon was served by a branch of the Chicago and Northwestern Railroad between Doland and Groton. The line was abandoned in 1970, with the last passenger service to the town being in 1965.

On January 12, 1888, a blizzard hit Verdon suddenly. Students in the township's school, located about a mile north of town along the railroad tracks, were stranded. A rescue party was organized and went to the school with a wagon set on the tracks. A human chain was formed and successfully ferried the students back to town safely on the wagon.

== Geography ==
According to the United States Census Bureau, the town has a total area of 0.25 square miles (0.65 km^{2}), all land.

== Demographics ==
Historical population
Census	Pop.	Note	%±
1910	136		—
1920	90		−33.8%
1930	69		−23.3%
1940	65		−5.8%
1950	34		−47.7%
1960	28		−17.6%
1970	18		−35.7%
1980	7		−61.1%
1990	7		0.0%
2000	6		−14.3%
2010	5		−16.7%
2020	3		−40.0%
U.S. Decennial Census; 2018 Estimate

=== 2010 census ===
As of the census of 2010, there were 5 people, 2 households, and 1 families residing in the town. The population density was 20.0 inhabitants per square mile (7.7/km^{2}). There were 4 housing units at an average density of 16.0 per square mile (6.2/km^{2}). The racial makeup of the town was 100.0% White.

There were 2 households, of which 50.0% were married couples living together and 50.0% were non-families. 0.0% of all households were made up of individuals. The average household size was 2.50 and the average family size was 3.00.

The median age in the town was 22.5 years. 0.0% of residents were under the age of 18; 60% were between the ages of 18 and 24; 0.0% were from 25 to 44; 40% were from 45 to 64; and 0.0% were 65 years of age or older. The gender makeup of the town was 60.0% male and 40.0% female.

=== 2000 census ===
As of the census of 2000, there were 6 people, 2 households, and 1 family residing in the town. The population density was 24.3 people per square mile (9.3/km^{2}). There were 4 housing units at an average density of 16.2 per square mile (6.2/km^{2}). The racial makeup of the town was 100.00% White.

There were 2 households, out of which 50.0% had children under the age of 18 living with them, 50.0% were married couples, and 50.0% were non-families. 50.0% of all households were made up of individuals, and 50.0% had someone living alone who was 65 years of age or older. The average household size was 3.00 and the average family size was 5.00.

In the town, the population was spread out, with 50.0% under the age of 18, 33.3% from 25 to 44, and 16.7% who were 65 years of age or older. The median age was 26 years. For every 100 females, there were 100 males. For every 100 females age 18 and over, there were 50 males.

== See also ==
- List of towns in South Dakota
