= Selby, South Dakota =

Selby
- City
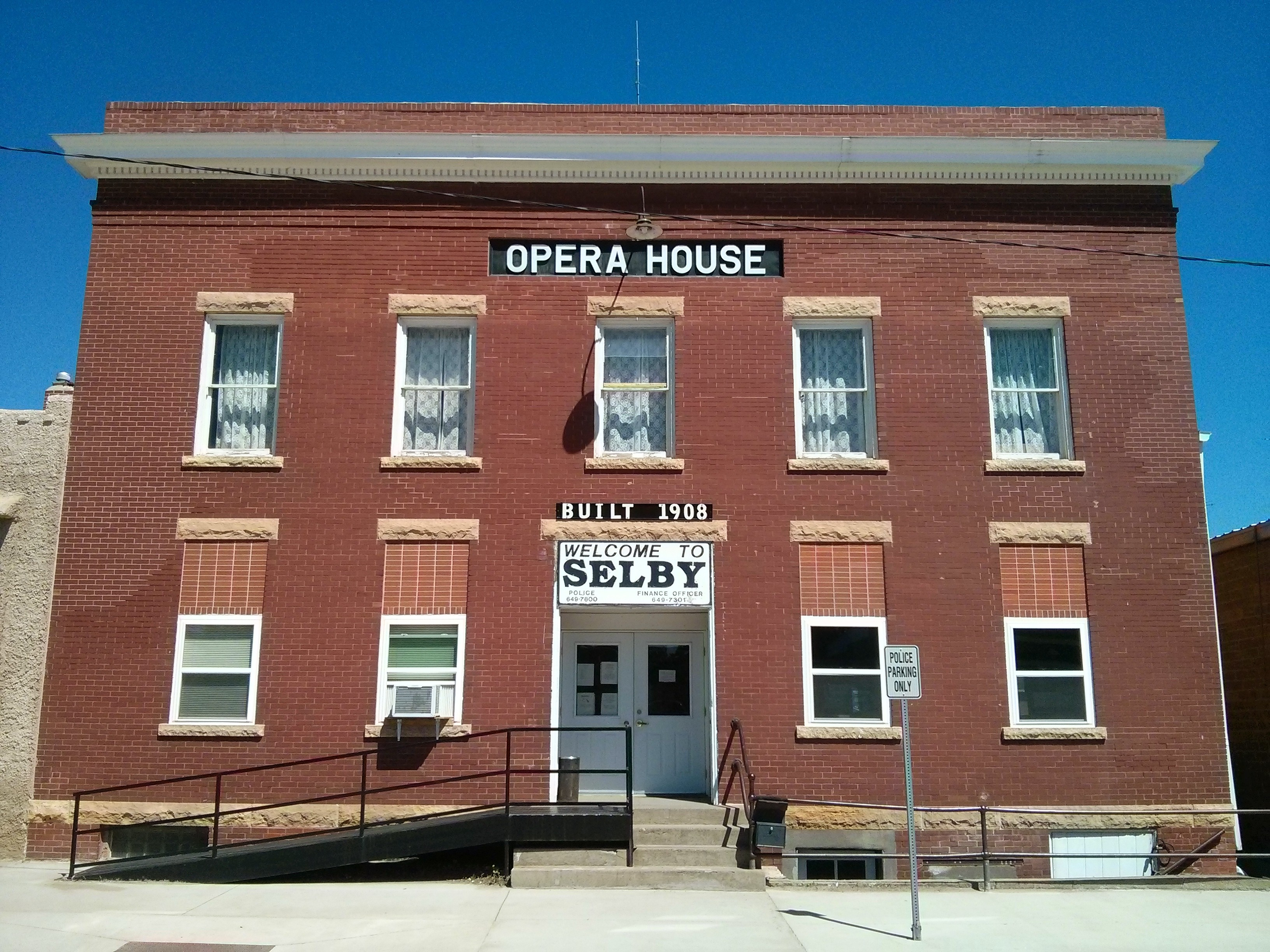
- Selby Opera House

- Location in Walworth County and the state of South Dakota
- Coordinates: 45°30′21″N 100°01′58″W
- Country: United States
- State: South Dakota
- County: Walworth
- Incorporated: 1909

Area
  - Total: 0.71 sq mi (1.84 km^{2})
  - Land: 0.71 sq mi (1.84 km^{2})
  - Water: 0 sq mi (0.00 km^{2})
- Elevation: 1,896 ft (578 m)

Population (2020)
  - Total: 610
  - Density: 856.7/sq mi (330.77/km^{2})
- Time zone: UTC-6 (Central (CST))
  - Summer (DST): UTC-5 (CDT)
- ZIP code: 57472
- Area code: 605
- FIPS code: 46-58140
- GNIS feature ID: 1267562
- Website: City of Selby

Selby is a city in Walworth County, South Dakota, United States. The population was 610 at the 2020 census. It is the county seat of Walworth County.

== History ==
Vivian's Beauty Shop, Selby, 1987

Selby sprang up with the arrival of the Chicago, Milwaukee, St. Paul and Pacific Railroad to the area in 1899. The town was named for a railroad official.

== Geography ==
According to the United States Census Bureau, the city has a total area of 0.71 square miles (1.84 km^{2}), all land.

=== Climate ===
Climate data for Selby, South Dakota (1991−2020 normals, extremes 1907−present)
Month	Jan	Feb	Mar	Apr	May	Jun	Jul	Aug	Sep	Oct	Nov	Dec	Year
Record high °F (°C)	63 (17)	67 (19)	83 (28)	97 (36)	100 (38)	109 (43)	112 (44)	108 (42)	104 (40)	95 (35)	77 (25)	63 (17)	112 (44)
Mean daily maximum °F (°C)	23.2 (−4.9)	27.7 (−2.4)	40.5 (4.7)	54.9 (12.7)	67.3 (19.6)	77.5 (25.3)	84.1 (28.9)	82.8 (28.2)	73.7 (23.2)	57.5 (14.2)	40.8 (4.9)	28.0 (−2.2)	54.8 (12.7)
Daily mean °F (°C)	13.6 (−10.2)	17.7 (−7.9)	29.9 (−1.2)	43.0 (6.1)	55.7 (13.2)	66.2 (19.0)	72.2 (22.3)	70.3 (21.3)	60.9 (16.1)	45.7 (7.6)	30.7 (−0.7)	18.8 (−7.3)	43.7 (6.5)
Mean daily minimum °F (°C)	4.0 (−15.6)	7.6 (−13.6)	19.3 (−7.1)	31.0 (−0.6)	44.0 (6.7)	54.9 (12.7)	60.3 (15.7)	57.7 (14.3)	48.2 (9.0)	34.0 (1.1)	20.6 (−6.3)	9.7 (−12.4)	32.6 (0.3)
Record low °F (°C)	−41 (−41)	−36 (−38)	−29 (−34)	−3 (−19)	18 (−8)	30 (−1)	38 (3)	29 (−2)	17 (−8)	−2 (−19)	−20 (−29)	−36 (−38)	−41 (−41)
Average precipitation inches (mm)	0.40 (10)	0.57 (14)	0.79 (20)	1.60 (41)	2.82 (72)	3.45 (88)	2.68 (68)	2.41 (61)	1.64 (42)	1.83 (46)	0.54 (14)	0.51 (13)	19.24 (489)
Average snowfall inches (cm)	4.0 (10)	7.0 (18)	5.1 (13)	4.4 (11)	0.2 (0.51)	0.0 (0.0)	0.0 (0.0)	0.0 (0.0)	0.0 (0.0)	1.6 (4.1)	3.5 (8.9)	7.6 (19)	33.4 (85)
Average precipitation days (≥ 0.01 in)	5.0	5.4	5.9	7.3	10.1	10.8	8.4	7.5	6.1	6.6	4.2	4.4	81.7
Average snowy days (≥ 0.1 in)	4.4	4.8	3.6	1.8	0.0	0.0	0.0	0.0	0.0	0.8	2.6	4.4	22.4
Source: NOAA

== Demographics ==
Historical population
Census	Pop.	Note	%±
1910	558		—
1920	564		1.1%
1930	548		−2.8%
1940	599		9.3%
1950	706		17.9%
1960	979		38.7%
1970	957		−2.2%
1980	884		−7.6%
1990	707		−20.0%
2000	736		4.1%
2010	642		−12.8%
2020	610		−5.0%
U.S. Decennial Census

=== 2020 census ===
As of the 2020 census, Selby had a population of 610. The median age was 51.9 years. 18.7% of residents were under the age of 18 and 31.6% of residents were 65 years of age or older. For every 100 females there were 97.4 males, and for every 100 females age 18 and over there were 94.5 males age 18 and over.

0.0% of residents lived in urban areas, while 100.0% lived in rural areas.

There were 257 households in Selby, of which 23.7% had children under the age of 18 living in them. Of all households, 45.1% were married-couple households, 20.6% were households with a male householder and no spouse or partner present, and 27.6% were households with a female householder and no spouse or partner present. About 40.9% of all households were made up of individuals and 27.2% had someone living alone who was 65 years of age or older.

There were 307 housing units, of which 16.3% were vacant. The homeowner vacancy rate was 2.4% and the rental vacancy rate was 19.4%.

Racial composition as of the 2020 census
Race	Number	Percent
White	564	92.5%
Black or African American	2	0.3%
American Indian and Alaska Native	27	4.4%
Asian	6	1.0%
Native Hawaiian and Other Pacific Islander	0	0.0%
Some other race	0	0.0%
Two or more races	11	1.8%
Hispanic or Latino (of any race)	8	1.3%

=== 2010 census ===
At the 2010 census there were 642 people in 300 households, including 175 families, in the city. The population density was 904.2 inhabitants per square mile (349.1/km^{2}). There were 334 housing units at an average density of 470.4 per square mile (181.6/km^{2}). The racial makeup of the city was 96.7% White, 2.0% Native American, and 1.2% from two or more races. Hispanic or Latino of any race were 0.5%.

Of the 300 households 19.0% had children under the age of 18 living with them, 51.3% were married couples living together, 4.7% had a female householder with no husband present, 2.3% had a male householder with no wife present, and 41.7% were non-families. 39.0% of households were one person and 22.6% were one person aged 65 or older. The average household size was 1.98 and the average family size was 2.62.

The median age was 52.9 years. 16% of residents were under the age of 18; 3.4% were between the ages of 18 and 24; 18.7% were from 25 to 44; 27.8% were from 45 to 64; and 34.1% were 65 or older. The gender makeup of the city was 51.2% male and 48.8% female.

=== 2000 census ===
At the 2000 census, there were 736 people in 308 households, including 199 families, in the city. The population density was 882.7 inhabitants per square mile (340.8/km^{2}). There were 335 housing units at an average density of 401.8 per square mile (155.1/km^{2}). The racial makup of the city was 98.10% White, 1.36% Native American, 0.14% from other races, and 0.41% from two or more races. Hispanic or Latino of any race were 0.27% of the population.

Of the 308 households 23.4% had children under the age of 18 living with them, 57.1% were married couples living together, 5.8% had a female householder with no husband present, and 35.1% were non-families. 34.1% of households were one person and 21.4% were one person aged 65 or older. The average household size was 2.16 and the average family size was 2.74.

The age distribution was 20.4% under the age of 18, 3.4% from 18 to 24, 20.5% from 25 to 44, 25.3% from 45 to 64, and 30.4% 65 or older. The median age was 51 years. For every 100 females, there were 92.7 males. For every 100 females age 18 and over, there were 86.6 males.

The median household income was $27,639 and the median family income was $37,500. Males had a median income of $26,563 versus $18,214 for females. The per capita income for the city was $16,433. About 4.7% of families and 8.3% of the population were below the poverty line, including 2.6% of those under age 18 and 16.1% of those age 65 or over.

== Notable people ==
- John A. Manke, test pilot and director of NASA Dryden Flight Research Center
- John Stiegelmeier, former head coach of South Dakota State University, who won a national championship in 2022.
- Walter L. Zabel (1914–2007), Politician, member of the South Dakota House of Representatives
