= Java, South Dakota =

- Town
- Location in Walworth County and the state of South Dakota
- Coordinates: 45°30′13″N 99°53′02″W
- Country: United States
- State: South Dakota
- County: Walworth
- Incorporated: 1903

Area
  - Total: 0.49 sq mi (1.27 km^{2})
  - Land: 0.49 sq mi (1.27 km^{2})
  - Water: 0 sq mi (0.00 km^{2})
- Elevation: 2,080 ft (630 m)

Population (2020)
  - Total: 121
  - Density: 246.1/sq mi (95.02/km^{2})
- Time zone: UTC-6 (Central (CST))
  - Summer (DST): UTC-5 (CDT)
- ZIP code: 57452
- Area code: 605
- FIPS code: 46-32460
- GNIS feature ID: 1267440

Java is a town in Walworth County, South Dakota, United States. The population was 121 at the 2020 census.

Java derives its name from Java coffee, and Coffee Town was an early variant name. Java received its name from railroad crews on the Chicago, Milwaukee & St. Paul Railway Line who would stop for coffee in the town prior to the railroad's relocation in 1908.

== History ==
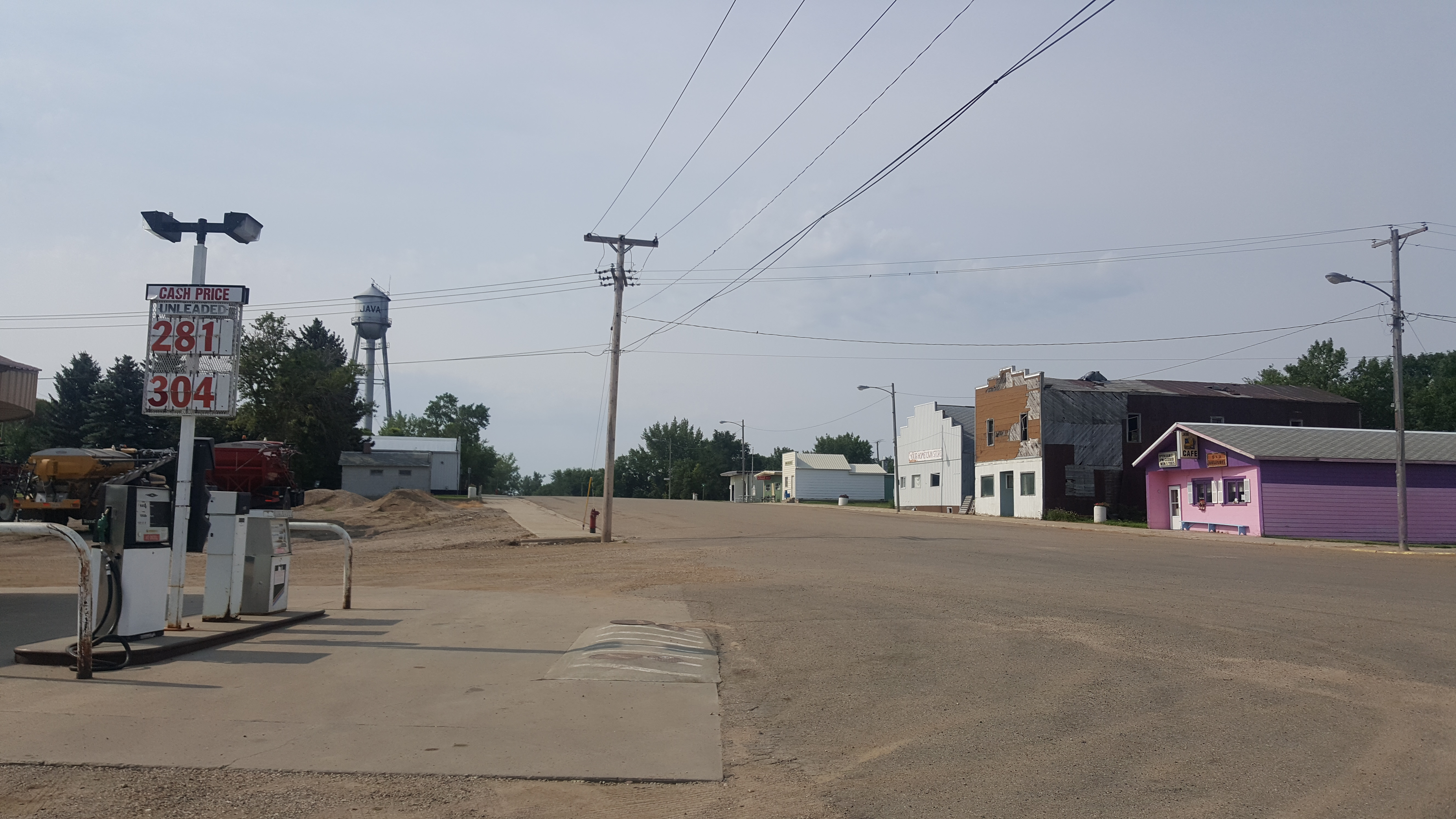
Main Street, Java in 2018.

Java was founded in 1900, shortly after the Chicago, Milwaukee & St. Paul Railway Line was extended from Bowdle to the Missouri River. The village was incorporated into a town by election in 1903 after survey of the townsite by Surveyor George Merriman of Bowdle on September 5 of that year.

Many of the first homesteaders were of German, Russian, Dutch, English, and Hungarian ancestry. The Java Herald, the first newspaper serving the town, was established in 1903 by Carl F. Clement, and was printed in both English and German.

In 1904, the first municipal building, a jail, was erected, in addition to gravel streets and an engine house equipped with a fire engine, hoses, and other related items. Additionally, the Dakota Central Telephone Company installed a telephone booth and switchboard at The Java House, Java's first hotel, founded in 1900 by H. A. Taylor. Later, wooden sidewalks, a water reservoir, a town hall, a town well, and a windmill (to grind grain) were added. These additions were paid by warrants issued by the town, and in 1906 a $2,000 bond issue was passed to remove the debt.

In 1905, the Kupp Brothers, J. C. and George, supervised the installation of a more permanent telephone system in the town for the Dakota Telephone Co.

By 1907, the town possessed fire protection, a cemetery association, water supply, municipal buildings, and improved telephone facilities. Another addition to the town was made when the Milwaukee Land Company had their property north of the railroad track surveyed and added.

From 1908-1909, the railroad company rerouted its track, passing north of the town by one-half mile. The citizens received a proposal from railroad officials to move the town north, however, this proposal was refused, and the town was served thereafter by a spur line constructed by the company.

By 1913, the town had a Catholic, a Presbyterian, a German Lutheran, and a German Congregational Church. In 1915, the wooden sidewalks along Main street were removed and replaced with cement sidewalks. Later that year, the town hall was remodeled, the jail was moved, a bell tower was constructed. In 1916, a municipal light plant was constructed. In 1921, a schoolhouse was constructed, and at this time Java was incorporated from a town into a city, and adopted the Mayor-Alderman form of government, the first mayor under this new system being Carl F. Clement. In 1939, a Public Works Administration project was begun, creating a waterworks system to include both commercial and private users.

In 1947, the city saw the creation of a park board that established a city park just west of the school house.

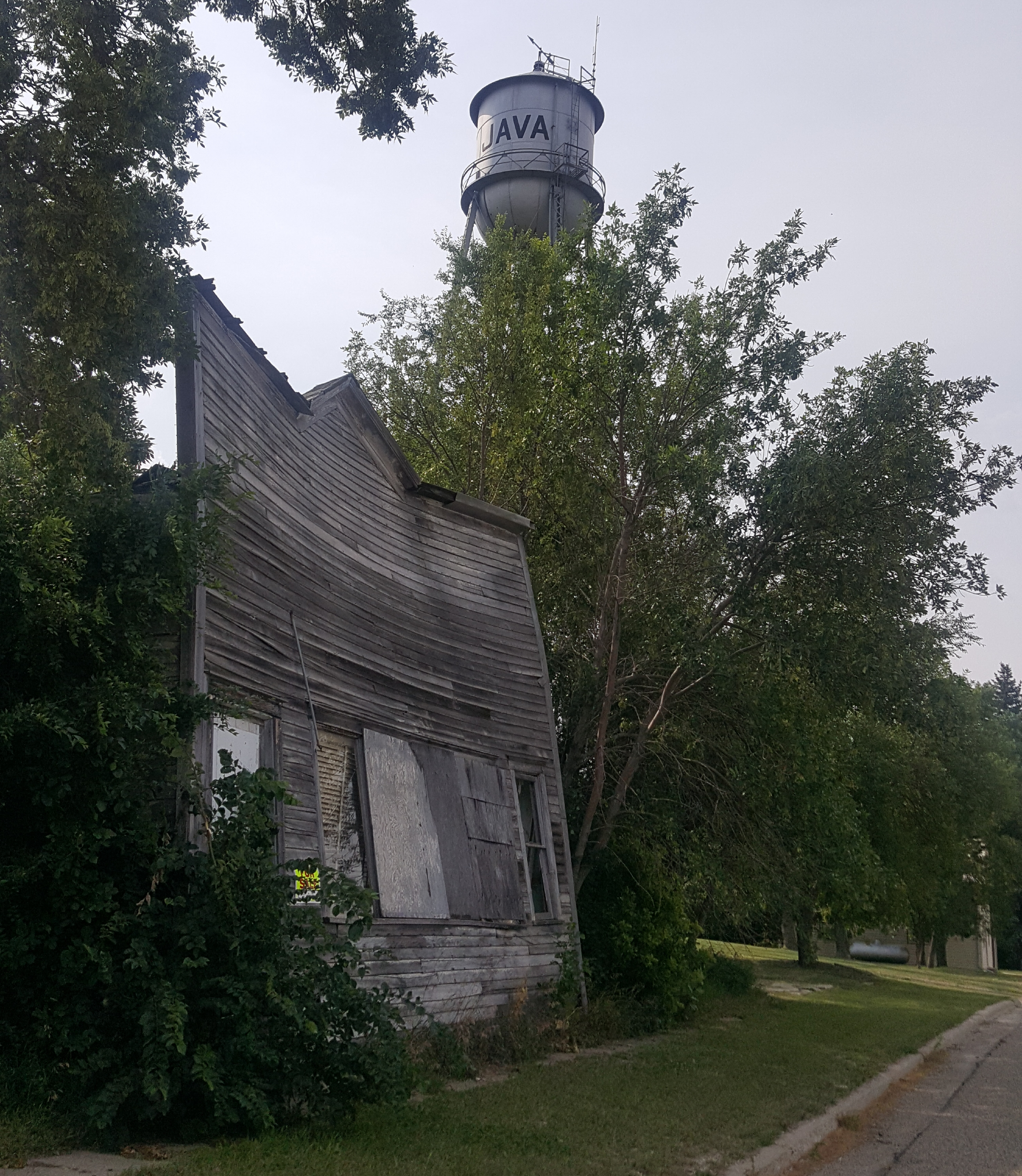
The old blacksmith shop in Java, in 2018, opened by John Banik in 1901.

=== Java High School ===
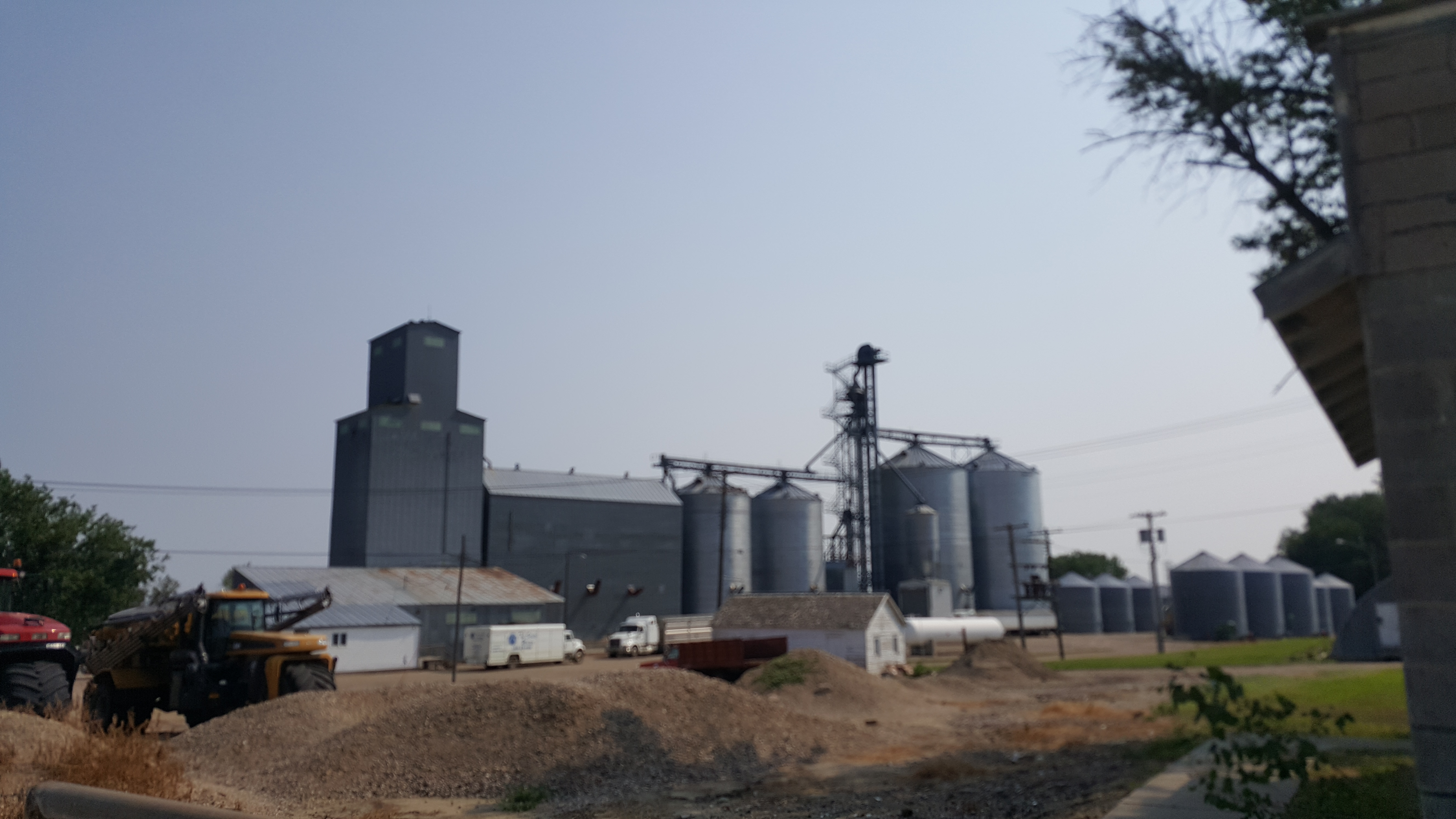
Grain elevators in Java, in 2018.

In 1901, the first term of school was help in a building that had been relocated into town, serving twenty-three students, ranging in age from five to eighteen years. In 1903, a frame school building was built on the site two blocks east of Main Street and was used until 1921, when the fireproof brick schoolhouse was constructed.

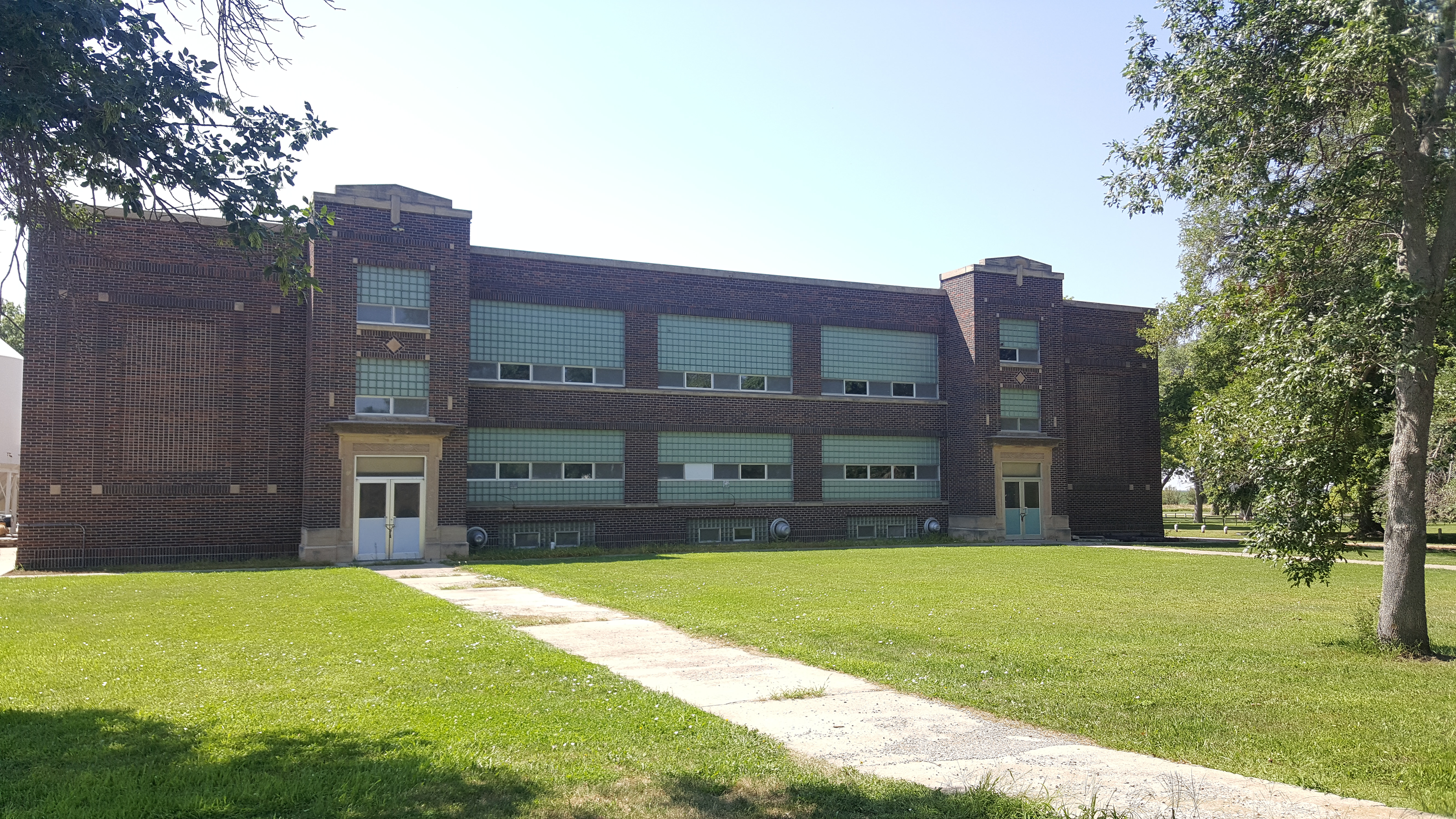
The old schoolhouse in Java built in 1921. Photo taken in 2018.

== Geography ==
According to the United States Census Bureau, the town has a total area of 0.49 square miles (1.27 km^{2}), all land.

== Demographics ==
Historical population
Census	Pop.	Note	%±
1910	473		—
1920	527		11.4%
1930	529		0.4%
1940	493		−6.8%
1950	433		−12.2%
1960	406		−6.2%
1970	305		−24.9%
1980	261		−14.4%
1990	161		−38.3%
2000	197		22.4%
2010	129		−34.5%
2020	121		−6.2%
U.S. Decennial Census

=== 2010 census ===
As of the census of 2010, there were 129 people, 69 households, and 38 families residing in the town. The population density was 263.3 inhabitants per square mile (101.7/km^{2}). There were 119 housing units at an average density of 242.9 per square mile (93.8/km^{2}). The racial makeup of the town was 93.0% White, 3.1% Native American, and 3.9% from two or more races.

There were 69 households, of which 13.0% had children under the age of 18 living with them, 44.9% were married couples living together, 7.2% had a female householder with no husband present, 2.9% had a male householder with no wife present, and 44.9% were non-families. 40.6% of all households were made up of individuals, and 24.6% had someone living alone who was 65 years of age or older. The average household size was 1.87 and the average family size was 2.47.

The median age in the town was 57.1 years. 14% of residents were under the age of 18; 3.2% were between the ages of 18 and 24; 15.5% were from 25 to 44; 30.4% were from 45 to 64; and 37.2% were 65 years of age or older. The gender makeup of the town was 45.0% male and 55.0% female.

=== 2000 census ===
As of the census of 2000, there were 197 people, 94 households, and 56 families residing in the town. The population density was 410.9 inhabitants per square mile (158.6/km^{2}). There were 133 housing units at an average density of 277.4 per square mile (107.1/km^{2}). The racial makeup of the town was 95.94% White and 4.06% Native American.

There were 94 households, out of which 13.8% had children under the age of 18 living with them, 56.4% were married couples living together, 4.3% had a female householder with no husband present, and 39.4% were non-families. 37.2% of all households were made up of individuals, and 25.5% had someone living alone who was 65 years of age or older. The average household size was 2.10 and the average family size was 2.72.

In the town, the population was spread out, with 16.2% under the age of 18, 3.0% from 18 to 24, 20.3% from 25 to 44, 23.9% from 45 to 64, and 36.5% who were 65 years of age or older. The median age was 56 years. For every 100 females, there were 103.1 males. For every 100 females age 18 and over, there were 98.8 males.

The median income for a household in the town was $29,125, and the median income for a family was $36,875. Males had a median income of $20,625 versus $14,750 for females. The per capita income for the town was $19,427. About 6.4% of families and 11.0% of the population were below the poverty line, including 9.4% of those under the age of eighteen and 6.5% of those 65 or over.
