= Conde, South Dakota =

- City
- Location in Spink County and the state of South Dakota
- Coordinates: 45°09′26″N 98°05′44″W
- Country: United States
- State: South Dakota
- County: Spink
- Incorporated: 1909

Area
  - Total: 0.56 sq mi (1.46 km^{2})
  - Land: 0.56 sq mi (1.46 km^{2})
  - Water: 0 sq mi (0.00 km^{2})
- Elevation: 1,319 ft (402 m)

Population (2020)
  - Total: 142
  - Density: 252.2/sq mi (97.37/km^{2})
- Time zone: UTC-6 (Central (CST))
  - Summer (DST): UTC-5 (CDT)
- ZIP code: 57434
- Area code: 605
- FIPS code: 46-13700
- GNIS feature ID: 1267336

Conde is a city in Spink County, South Dakota, United States. The population was 142 at the 2020 census.

== History ==
Conde was platted in 1886. It was named after the Princes of Condé of France. A post office called Conde has been in operation since 1892.

== Geography ==
According to the United States Census Bureau, the city has a total area of 0.56 square miles (1.45 km^{2}), all land.

=== Climate ===
Climate data for Conde, South Dakota (1991–2020)
Month	Jan	Feb	Mar	Apr	May	Jun	Jul	Aug	Sep	Oct	Nov	Dec	Year
Mean daily maximum °F (°C)	22.5 (−5.3)	27.7 (−2.4)	40.2 (4.6)	55.9 (13.3)	68.3 (20.2)	78.3 (25.7)	83.9 (28.8)	82.2 (27.9)	74.1 (23.4)	59.6 (15.3)	42.4 (5.8)	28.5 (−1.9)	55.3 (13.0)
Daily mean °F (°C)	12.1 (−11.1)	16.6 (−8.6)	29.4 (−1.4)	43.4 (6.3)	56.3 (13.5)	66.7 (19.3)	71.8 (22.1)	69.7 (20.9)	61.0 (16.1)	46.6 (8.1)	31.2 (−0.4)	18.1 (−7.7)	43.6 (6.4)
Mean daily minimum °F (°C)	1.7 (−16.8)	5.5 (−14.7)	18.7 (−7.4)	31.0 (−0.6)	44.4 (6.9)	55.2 (12.9)	59.8 (15.4)	57.3 (14.1)	47.9 (8.8)	33.6 (0.9)	20.0 (−6.7)	7.8 (−13.4)	31.9 (−0.1)
Average precipitation inches (mm)	0.59 (15)	0.62 (16)	0.97 (25)	2.42 (61)	2.83 (72)	4.06 (103)	3.61 (92)	2.69 (68)	2.57 (65)	2.27 (58)	0.79 (20)	0.72 (18)	24.14 (613)
Average snowfall inches (cm)	5.4 (14)	6.4 (16)	3.9 (9.9)	2.3 (5.8)	0.0 (0.0)	0.0 (0.0)	0.0 (0.0)	0.0 (0.0)	0.0 (0.0)	0.4 (1.0)	5.1 (13)	4.5 (11)	28 (70.7)
Source: NOAA

== Demographics ==
Historical population
Census	Pop.	Note	%±
1900	195		—
1910	592		203.6%
1920	544		−8.1%
1930	431		−20.8%
1940	395		−8.4%
1950	409		3.5%
1960	388		−5.1%
1970	279		−28.1%
1980	259		−7.2%
1990	203		−21.6%
2000	187		−7.9%
2010	140		−25.1%
2020	142		1.4%
U.S. Decennial Census

=== 2020 census ===
As of the 2020 census, Conde had a population of 142. The median age was 54.5 years. 17.6% of residents were under the age of 18 and 26.1% of residents were 65 years of age or older. For every 100 females there were 77.5 males, and for every 100 females age 18 and over there were 80.0 males age 18 and over.

0.0% of residents lived in urban areas, while 100.0% lived in rural areas.

There were 72 households in Conde, of which 11.1% had children under the age of 18 living in them. Of all households, 37.5% were married-couple households, 23.6% were households with a male householder and no spouse or partner present, and 34.7% were households with a female householder and no spouse or partner present. About 52.8% of all households were made up of individuals and 31.9% had someone living alone who was 65 years of age or older.

There were 102 housing units, of which 29.4% were vacant. The homeowner vacancy rate was 1.4% and the rental vacancy rate was 61.5%.

Racial composition as of the 2020 census
Race	Number	Percent
White	139	97.9%
Black or African American	0	0.0%
American Indian and Alaska Native	0	0.0%
Asian	0	0.0%
Native Hawaiian and Other Pacific Islander	0	0.0%
Some other race	0	0.0%
Two or more races	3	2.1%
Hispanic or Latino (of any race)	2	1.4%

=== 2010 census ===
As of the census of 2010, there were 140 people, 76 households, and 46 families residing in the city. The population density was 250.0 inhabitants per square mile (96.5/km^{2}). There were 111 housing units at an average density of 198.2 per square mile (76.5/km^{2}). The racial makeup of the city was 100.0% White.

There were 76 households, of which 13.2% had children under the age of 18 living with them, 50.0% were married couples living together, 9.2% had a female householder with no husband present, 1.3% had a male householder with no wife present, and 39.5% were non-families. 38.2% of all households were made up of individuals, and 13.1% had someone living alone who was 65 years of age or older. The average household size was 1.84 and the average family size was 2.35.

The median age in the city was 54 years. 13.6% of residents were under the age of 18; 3.5% were between the ages of 18 and 24; 15% were from 25 to 44; 42.9% were from 45 to 64; and 25% were 65 years of age or older. The gender makeup of the city was 50.0% male and 50.0% female.

=== 2000 census ===
As of the census of 2000, there were 187 people, 92 households, and 50 families residing in the city. The population density was 333.3 inhabitants per square mile (128.7/km^{2}). There were 119 housing units at an average density of 212.1 per square mile (81.9/km^{2}). The racial makeup of the city was 97.33% White, 2.14% Native American and 0.53% Asian.

There were 92 households, out of which 19.6% had children under the age of 18 living with them, 48.9% were married couples living together, 2.2% had a female householder with no husband present, and 44.6% were non-families. 41.3% of all households were made up of individuals, and 20.7% had someone living alone who was 65 years of age or older. The average household size was 2.03 and the average family size was 2.76.

In the city, the population was spread out, with 20.9% under the age of 18, 4.3% from 18 to 24, 25.1% from 25 to 44, 22.5% from 45 to 64, and 27.3% who were 65 years of age or older. The median age was 45 years. For every 100 females, there were 105.5 males. For every 100 females age 18 and over, there were 102.7 males.

The median income for a household in the city was $28,875, and the median income for a family was $41,250. Males had a median income of $26,667 versus $20,000 for females. The per capita income for the city was $17,481. About 7.4% of families and 15.1% of the population were below the poverty line, including 20.8% of those under the age of eighteen and 10.0% of those 65 or over.
