= Timeline of Sioux Falls, South Dakota =

The following is a timeline of the history of the city of Sioux Falls, South Dakota, USA.

== 19th century ==
- 1856 - Western Town Company develops townsite.
- 1857 - Dakota Land Company develops townsite.
- 1859 - Democrat newspaper begins publication.
- 1867 - Permanent settlement established.
- 1868 - Sioux Falls becomes capital of Minnehaha County, Dakota Territory.
- 1871 - Cataract House hotel in business.
- 1872
  - Sioux Falls Pantagraph newspaper begins publication.
  - Calvary Church built.
- 1873
  - Sioux Falls Independent newspaper begins publication.
  - Population: 593.
- 1874 - Bank for Savings opens.
- 1877
  - Village incorporated.
  - March: C.K. Howard elected president of village board of trustees.
- 1878 - Sioux Falls Times newspaper begins publication.
- 1879
  - Irving School, Free Methodist Church, and Congregational Church built.
  - Ladies Club library organized.
- 1880 - Dakota Territorial School for Deaf Mutes established.
- 1881
  - Sioux Falls Argus newspaper begins publication.
  - Penitentiary established.
  - Queen Bee Mill in business.
- 1882
  - Telephone begins operating.
  - First Baptist Church built.
- 1883
  - City chartered.
  - April 3: Jacob Schaetzel elected mayor.
  - Sioux Falls College founded.
  - Sioux Falls Daily Press newspaper begins publication.
- 1884 - Swedish Baptist Church built.
- 1885
  - Norberg Paints founded, still operating as the oldest family owned business in the state of South Dakota.
  - Dakota Deutsche Zeitung German-language newspaper begins publication.
- 1886 - Sioux Falls Bank established.
- 1887
  - Streetcars begin operating.
  - Dakota Bell begins publication.
- 1889
  - Lutheran Normal School opens.
  - German Congregational Emanuel Church and Episcopal Calvary Cathedral built.
  - Roman Catholic Diocese of Sioux Falls established.
- 1890
  - Minnehaha County Courthouse built.
  - Porter P. Peck becomes mayor.
  - Population: 10,177.
- 1891
  - Jordan Methodist Church dedicated.
  - Syd Dakota Ekko Norwegian-language newspaper relocates to Sioux Falls.
- 1894 - Fremad Norwegian/English-language newspaper begins publication.
- 1895 - Federal Building and United States Courthouse (Sioux Falls, South Dakota) constructed.
- 1897 - Scandinavian Methodist Episcopal Church organized.
- 1900
  - Manchester Biscuit Company in business.
  - Western Surety Company created by Joe Kirby.
  - Cataract Hotel Burns down, leading to Sioux Falls Volunteer Fire Dept. becoming a paid department.
  - Population: 10,266.

== 20th century ==
- 1903 - Carnegie Free Public Library opens.
- 1905 - Minnehaha Country Club founded.
- 1907 - First Congregational Church (Sioux Falls, South Dakota) built.
- 1908 - South Dakota Central Railway built.
- 1909 - Morrell Packing Plant in business.
- 1910 - Population: 14,094.
- 1911 - Orpheum Theatre built.
- 1912
  - Eighth Street Bridge (Sioux Falls, South Dakota) and Central Fire Station constructed.
  - McKennan Hospital established.
- 1916 Eastside Fire Station constructed.
- 1917 - Coliseum theatre built.
- 1918
  - Augustana College and Normal School established.
  - St. Joseph Cathedral (Sioux Falls, South Dakota) completed.
- 1922 - August 17: Three prisoners escape from State Penitentiary.
- 1924
  - Masonic Library founded.
  - Josephine Martin Glidden Memorial Chapel built.
- 1925 - State Theatre built.
- 1928 - Pettigrew Museum established.
- 1930 - Sioux Valley Hospital built.
- 1936 - March: Two prisoners escape from State Penitentiary.
- 1937 - City Hall built.
- 1942 - Sioux Falls Army Air Base established.
- 1949 - North American Baptist Seminary relocates to Sioux Falls.
- 1963 - Great Bear Ski Area established.
- 1966 - Pathfinder Nuclear Generating Station commissioned in nearby Brandon Township.
- 1970 - Sioux Falls Regional Airport terminal built.
- 1974 - Siouxland Heritage Museums established.
- 1975 - Empire Mall in business.
- 1981 - City of Sioux Falls Township Annexation Study was completed in November 1981
- 1983 - December 20: Airplane accident.
- 1986 - Qwest Tower (Sioux Falls) built.
- 1988 - Sioux Falls Jazz and Blues Festival begins.
- 1990 - Sister city relationship established with Potsdam, Germany.
- 1993 - Sister city relationship established with Strabane, Northern Ireland.
- 1995 - Central Baptist Church built.
- 1998 - City website online (approximate date).
- 1999 - Washington Pavilion of Arts and Science opens.
- 2000 - Population: 123,975.

== 21st century ==
- 2002 - Dave Munson becomes mayor.
- 2005 - Zip Feed Tower demolished.
- 2008 - Sister city relationship established with Newry and Mourne, Northern Ireland.
- 2010
  - Mike Huether becomes mayor.
  - Population: 153,888.
- 2011 - October 15: Occupy protest.

== See also ==
- History of Sioux Falls, South Dakota
- Media in Sioux Falls, South Dakota
- List of mayors of Sioux Falls, South Dakota
- List of museums in Sioux Falls
- National Register of Historic Places listings in Minnehaha County, South Dakota
- Timeline of South Dakota

== Bibliography ==
- Dana Reed Bailey (1899), "City of Sioux Falls", History of Minnehaha County, South Dakota, Sioux Falls: Brown & Saenger, printers
- "Sioux Falls" . Encyclopædia Britannica. Vol. 25 (11th ed.). 1910. p. 150.
- "Sioux Falls". Automobile Blue Book. New York: Automobile Blue Book Publishing Co. 1921. hdl:2027/mdp.39015069273939.
- "Sioux Falls". South Dakota State Gazetteer and Business Directory. R.L. Polk & Co. 1921. hdl:2027/umn.31951d00640540t – via HathiTrust.
- Federal Writers' Project (1938). "Sioux Falls". South Dakota Guide. American Guide Series. Pierre, S.D., State publishing company.
- David J. Wishart, ed. (2004). "Cities and Towns: Sioux Falls, South Dakota". Encyclopedia of the Great Plains. University of Nebraska Press. ISBN 0-8032-4787-7.
- James Fallows and Deborah Fallows, ed. (April 5, 2017), "City Makers: American Futures", The Atlantic (series of articles about Sioux Falls), 2014-
