= National Register of Historic Places listings in Clark County, South Dakota =

Location of Clark County in South Dakota

This is a list of the National Register of Historic Places listings in Clark County, South Dakota.

This is intended to be a complete list of the properties on the National Register of Historic Places in Clark County, South Dakota, United States. The locations of National Register properties for which the latitude and longitude coordinates are included below, may be seen in a map.

There are 10 properties listed on the National Register in the county.

This National Park Service list is complete through NPS recent listings posted March 14, 2025.

== Current listings ==
	Name on the Register	Image	Date listed	Location	City or town	Description
1	Bradley First Lutheran Church	Bradley First Lutheran Church	October 12, 2000 (#00001213)	3 miles southwest of Bradley; 45°03′51″N 97°43′01″W	Bradley	
2	Clark Center Lutheran Church		November 29, 2005 (#05001336)	East of the junction of 421st Ave. and 168th St. 44°57′08″N 97°47′21″W	Clark	
3	Clark County Courthouse	Clark County Courthouse	February 15, 2002 (#02000026)	200 N. Commercial St. 44°52′45″N 97°44′00″W	Clark	
4	Gov. S.H. Elrod House	Gov. S.H. Elrod House	July 27, 1979 (#79002399)	301 N. Commercial St. 44°52′49″N 97°43′58″W	Clark	
5	Garden City Opera House		December 20, 1988 (#88002839)	1st and Railroad Sts. 44°57′35″N 97°35′28″W	Garden City	
6	Good Hope Lutheran Church		July 11, 2002 (#02000727)	Road 35 northwest of Vienna; 44°44′49″N 97°38′13″W	Vienna	
7	Raymond Farmers and Citizens State Bank		December 6, 2016 (#16000824)	202 Flower St. 44°54′33″N 97°56′21″W	Raymond	
8	Security State Bank		May 30, 2002 (#02000577)	Garfield St. 44°37′45″N 97°38′06″W	Willow Lake	
9	Southeast Merton School No. 19		January 26, 1990 (#89002338)	North of Willow Lake; 44°44′48″N 97°38′40″W	Willow Lake	
10	Telemarken Lutheran Church	Telemarken Lutheran Church	October 19, 1989 (#89001720)	Northwest of Wallace; 45°06′00″N 97°29′40″W	Wallace	

== See also ==
- List of National Historic Landmarks in South Dakota
- National Register of Historic Places listings in South Dakota
