= Hillcrest Colony, South Dakota =

- Census-designated place
- Location within South Dakota Location within the United States
- Coordinates: 44°56′33″N 97°40′02″W
- Country: United States
- State: South Dakota
- County: Clark

Area
  - Total: 1.00 sq mi (2.59 km^{2})
  - Land: 1.00 sq mi (2.59 km^{2})
  - Water: 0 sq mi (0.00 km^{2})
- Elevation: 1,791 ft (546 m)

Population (2020)
  - Total: 94
  - Density: 93.8/sq mi (36.22/km^{2})
- Time zone: UTC-6 (Central (CST))
  - Summer (DST): UTC-5 (CDT)
- ZIP Code: 57236 (Garden City)
- Area code: 605
- FIPS code: 46-29116
- GNIS feature ID: 2813006

Hillcrest Colony is a Hutterite colony and census-designated place (CDP) in Clark County, South Dakota, United States. The population was 94 at the 2020 census. It was first listed as a CDP prior to the 2020 census.

It is in the northeast part of the county, on the southeast side of Dry Lake Number 1, 9 miles (14 km) by road northeast of Clark, the county seat.

== Demographics ==
Historical population
Census	Pop.	Note	%±
2020	94		—
U.S. Decennial Census
