= Hugill (disambiguation) =

Hugill may refer to:

- Hugill, Westmorland and Furness, Cumbria, England, UK; a civil parish
- Hugill Fell, Lake District, Cumbria, England, UK; a hill
- Hugill (surname)

== See also ==
- Hugil Close, Leven Park, England, UK; a street
- Hugill & Blatherwick, an architectural firm in South Dakota, USA
