= National Register of Historic Places listings in Ziebach County, South Dakota =

Location of Ziebach County in South Dakota

Ziebach County, South Dakota, United States, has one property listed on the National Register of Historic Places.

Latitude and longitude coordinates are provided for this property; they may be seen in a map.

This National Park Service list is complete through NPS recent listings posted October 2, 2026.

== Current listing ==
	Name on the Register	Image	Date listed	Location	City or town	Description
1	Ziebach County Courthouse	Ziebach County Courthouse	February 10, 1993 (#92001864)	Main St. between 2nd and 3rd Sts. 45°02′49″N 101°36′06″W	Dupree	Designed by Hugill & Blatherwick in Classical Revival style and built in 1931.
