= Hugall =

Hugall is a surname. Notable people with the surname include:

- Charlie Hugall (born 1984), British music producer, songwriter, and mix engineer
- Jimmy Hugall (1889–1927), English footballer
- John West Hugall (c. 1806–1880), British architect

== See also ==
- Geoff Huegill (born 1979), Australian swimmer
- Hugill (surname)
