= Qwest Tower =

Qwest Tower may refer to

- CenturyLink Tower (formerly Qwest Tower), the tallest building in Sioux Falls and the state of South Dakota
- Quest Tower, in Phoenix Plaza, 3rd tallest building in Phoenix

or either of the following skyscrapers in Denver, Colorado, USA:

- 1801 California Street, the former world headquarters of Qwest
- 555 17th Street, the Qwest headquarters from 1997 to 2000

== See also ==
- Qwest Building, a building in Minneapolis
- Qwest Field, in Seattle, Washington
- Qwest Center Omaha, in Omaha, Nebraska
- Qwest Arena, a multi-purpose arena in Boise, Idaho
