= Hugill & Blatherwick =

American architectural firm

Practice information
- Founders: George C. Hugill AIA; Wilfred F. Blatherwick AIA
- Founded: 1921
- Location: Sioux Falls, South Dakota

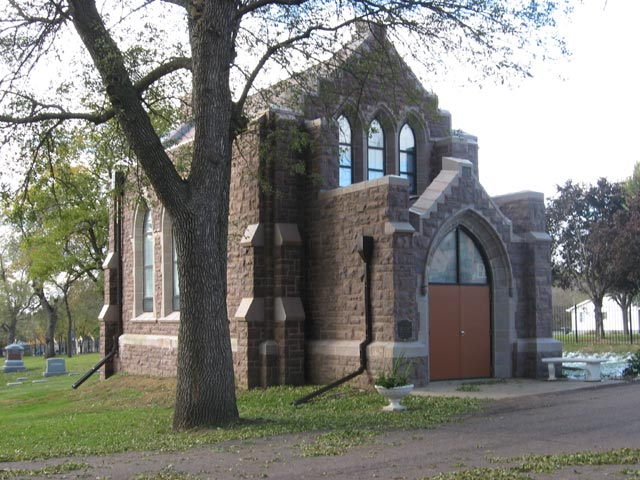
The Josephine Martin Glidden Memorial Chapel in Sioux Falls, designed by Hugill & Blatherwick and completed in 1924.

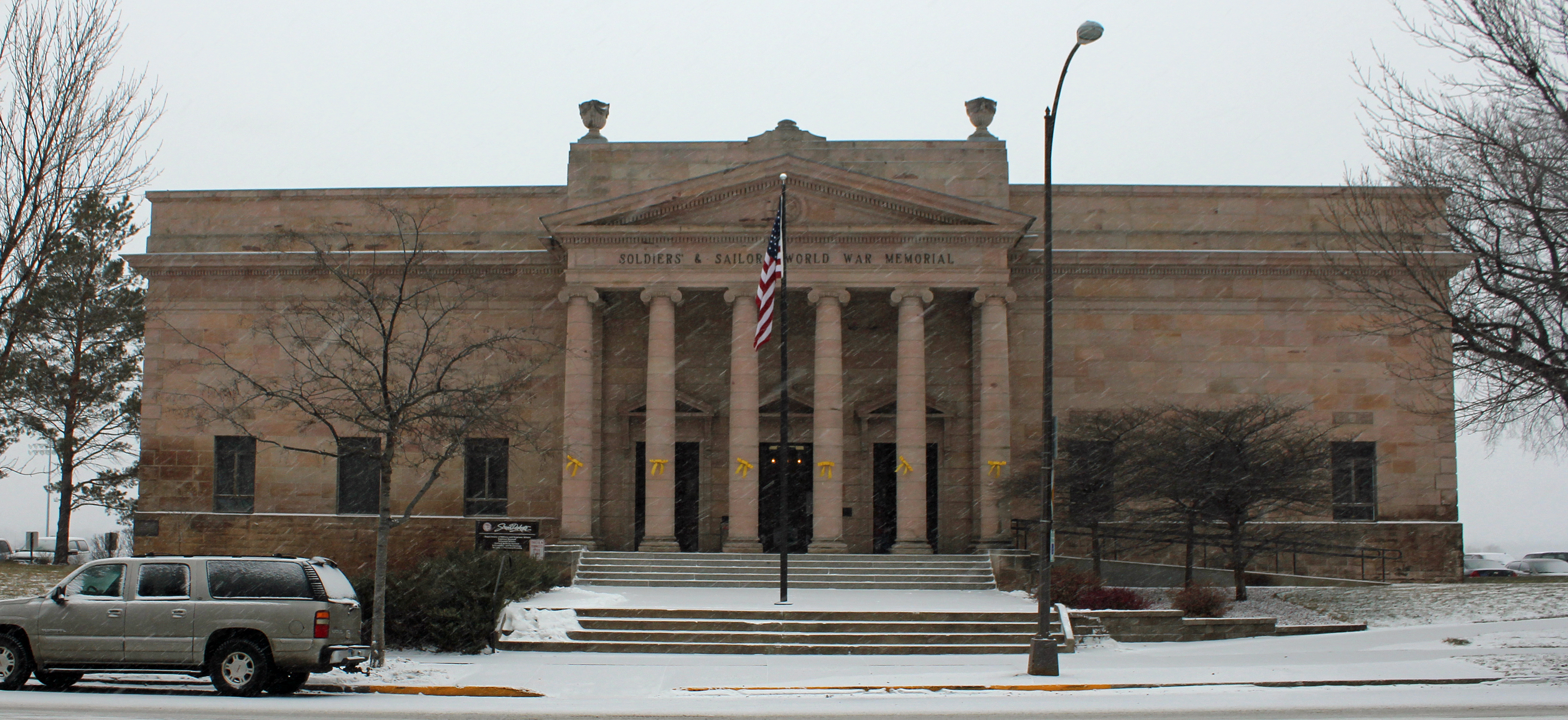
The Soldiers & Sailors World War Memorial in Pierre, designed by Hugill & Blatherwick and completed in 1932.

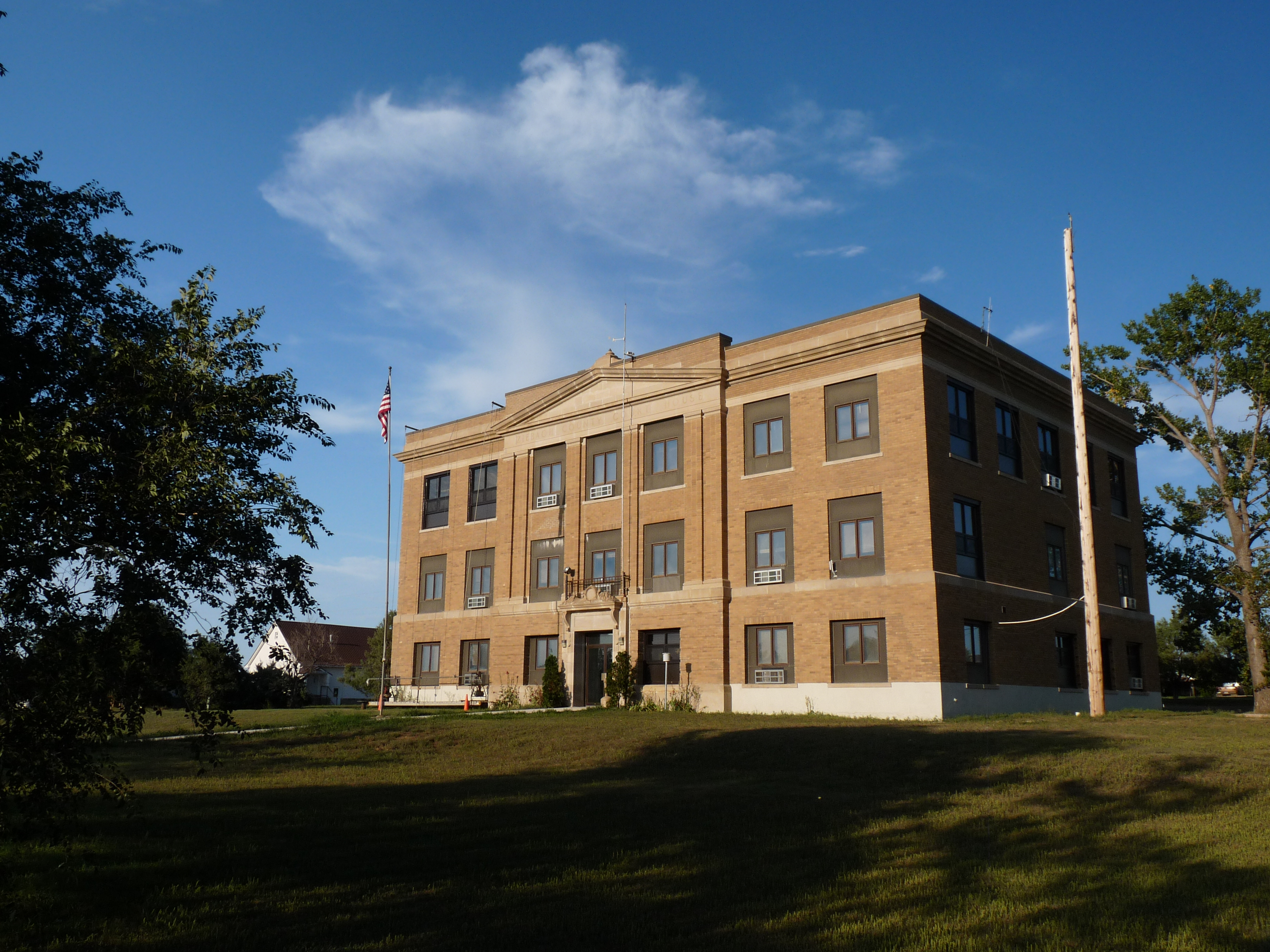
The Ziebach County Courthouse in Dupree, designed by Hugill & Blatherwick and completed in 1932.

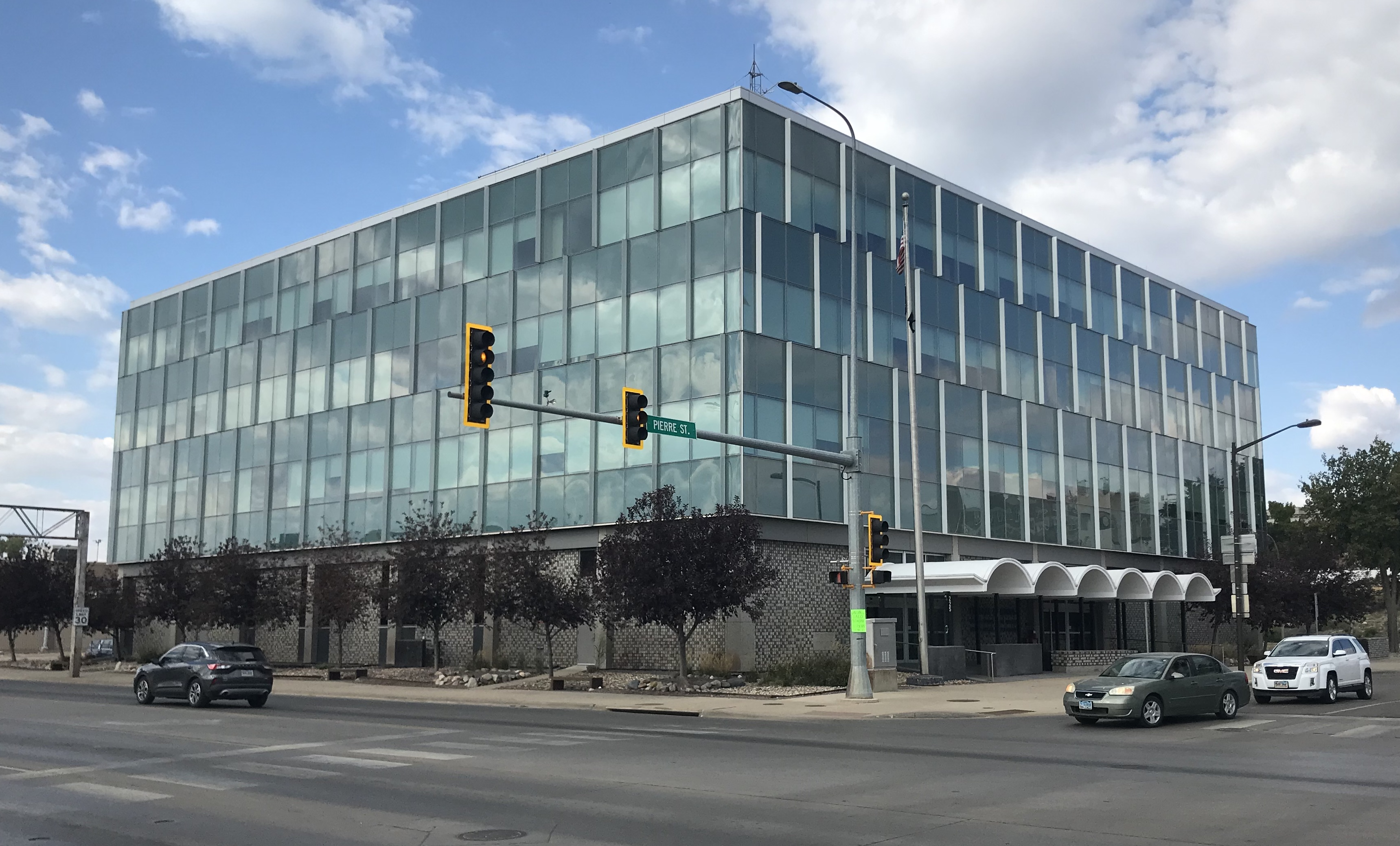
The Federal Building in Pierre, designed by Fritzel, Kroeger, Griffin & Berg and completed in 1965.

Hugill & Blatherwick was an architectural firm based in Sioux Falls, South Dakota, and active throughout the state of South Dakota. It was founded by architects George C. Hugill and Wilfred F. Blatherwick in 1921. Their successors managed the firm, under other names, until its dissolution in 2009.

== History ==
George C. Hugill, a native of Chicago, opened an architects' office in Sioux Falls in May, 1919. From July to November of that year he was a member of the firm of Hugill & Finkelhor, architects, with Robert Finkelhor. In 1921 he formed the partnership of Hugill & Blatherwick with Wilfred F. Blatherwick, chief draftsman for Perkins & McWayne, with whom he would work for the rest of his career.

After World War II the partnership was expanded. In 1946 it became Hugill, Blatherwick & Fritzel, with the addition of Wendell C. Fritzel, and in 1956 it became Hugill, Blatherwick, Fritzel & Kroeger, with the addition of Jean R. Kroeger. Hugill died in 1956, followed by Blatherwick in 1960. In 1963 their names were dropped, and the firm became Fritzel, Kroeger, Griffin & Berg with the addition of architect Edward L. Griffin and engineer Milton L. Berg. In 1985 the firm was incorporated as Holman Beck Associates, with architect Blake Holman and engineer Bill Beck as principals. In 1990 it became Holman & Associates with Beck's departure. The firm was dissolved in 2009.

== Partner biographies ==
=== George C. Hugill ===
George Christian Hugill AIA (January 29, 1888 – March 15, 1956) was born in Chicago. He was educated at the Art Institute of Chicago school and joined the office of Patton & Miller in 1908. He continued to work for that firm's successors, Patton, Holmes & Flinn and Holmes & Flinn, and first visited Sioux Falls in 1915 as a representative for the latter firm to supervise the construction of several schools. He was frequently in the city over the next four years.

Hugill was marred in 1911 to Edith Whittingham of Moundsville, West Virginia. They had two children, both daughters. He died in Sioux Falls at the age of 68.

=== Wilfred F. Blatherwick ===
Wilfred Francis Blatherwick AIA (June 7, 1890 – November 7, 1960) was born in Chattanooga, Tennessee, and raised in Vincennes, Indiana. He was educated at the University of Illinois, graduating with a BS in architecture in 1913. He then joined the office of Bausmith & Drainie, Cincinnati architects, and served in World War I. After the war he joined Perkins & McWayne in Sioux Falls, for whom he worked as chief draftsman and designer.

Blatherwick was married twice, first in 1916 to Margeret C. Kyser, who died in 1943, and second to Clara E. Krueger. He had four children. He died in Sioux Falls at the age of 70.

== Legacy ==
A number of their works are listed on the U.S. National Register of Historic Places.

== Architectural works ==
=== Hugill & Blatherwick, 1921–1946 ===
- 1924 – Josephine Martin Glidden Memorial Chapel, (Note: NRHP-listed.) 2121 E 12th St, Sioux Falls, South Dakota
- 1924 – LaSalle Apartments, 703 S Summit St, Sioux Falls, South Dakota
- 1925 – Grand Lodge and Library of the Ancient Free and Accepted Masons, 415 S Main Ave, Sioux Falls, South Dakota
- 1925 – Lake Preston High School, 300 1st St NE, Lake Preston, South Dakota
- 1932 – Soldiers & Sailors World War Memorial, 425 E Capitol Ave, Pierre, South Dakota
- 1932 – Ziebach County Courthouse, 215 S D St, Dupree, South Dakota
- 1934 – Clark County Courthouse, 200 N Commercial St, Clark, South Dakota
- 1935 – Hughes County Courthouse, 104 E Capitol Ave, Pierre, South Dakota
- 1935 – Lake County Courthouse, 200 Center St E, Madison, South Dakota
- 1940 – Presentation Children's Home, 701 S Western Ave, Sioux Falls, South Dakota

=== Hugill, Blatherwick & Fritzel, 1946–1955 ===
- 1950 – Linden House, 509 Linden Ave, Vermillion, South Dakota
- 1951 – First Baptist Church, 1401 S Covell Ave, Sioux Falls, South Dakota
- 1951 – Yeager Hall, South Dakota State University, Brookings, South Dakota
- 1953 – Andrew E. Lee Memorial Medicine and Science Hall, (Note: Demolished.) University of South Dakota, Vermillion, South Dakota
- 1956 – Axtell Middle School, 201 West Ave, Sioux Falls, South Dakota

=== Hugill, Blatherwick, Fritzel & Kroeger, 1956–1962 ===
- 1958 – Yankton High School (former), 2000 Mulberry St, Yankton, South Dakota
- 1959 – Cheyenne town development, (Note: A new town for the Cheyenne River Sioux, whose previous town was to be flooded by the lake behind the Oahe Dam.) Eagle Butte, South Dakota
- 1959 – Masonic Center, 520 S 1st Ave, Sioux Falls, South Dakota
- 1961 – Home Savings Association office building, 225 S Main Ave, Sioux Falls, South Dakota
- 1962 – Church of the Holy Apostles, 1415 S Bahnson Ave, Sioux Falls, South Dakota
- 1963 – Delzell Education Center, University of South Dakota, Vermillion, South Dakota
- 1963 – Mineral Industries Building, South Dakota School of Mines and Technology, Rapid City, South Dakota

=== Fritzel, Kroeger, Griffin & Berg, from 1963 ===
- 1964 – Norman B. Mears Library, University of Sioux Falls, Sioux Falls, South Dakota
- 1965 – Federal Building, 225 S Pierre St, Pierre, South Dakota
- 1965 – Vermillion High School, 1001 E Main St, Vermillion, South Dakota
- 1970 – Dell Rapids High School, 1216 Garfield Ave, Dell Rapids, South Dakota
- 1970 – Jeschke Fine Arts Center, University of Sioux Falls, Sioux Falls, South Dakota
- 1970 – Terminal, Sioux Falls Regional Airport, Sioux Falls, South Dakota
