= Collins Colony, South Dakota =

- Census-designated place
- Location within South Dakota Location within the United States
- Coordinates: 44°32′52″N 97°42′05″W
- Country: United States
- State: South Dakota
- County: Clark

Area
  - Total: 0.33 sq mi (0.86 km^{2})
  - Land: 0.33 sq mi (0.86 km^{2})
  - Water: 0 sq mi (0.00 km^{2})
- Elevation: 1,749 ft (533 m)

Population (2020)
  - Total: 92
  - Density: 277.3/sq mi (107.06/km^{2})
- Time zone: UTC-6 (Central (CST))
  - Summer (DST): UTC-5 (CDT)
- ZIP Code: 57353 (Iroquois)
- Area code: 605
- FIPS code: 46-13188
- GNIS feature ID: 2813008

Collins Colony is a Hutterite colony and census-designated place (CDP) in Clark County, South Dakota, United States. The population was 92 at the 2020 census. It was first listed as a CDP prior to the 2020 census.

It is on the southern edge of the county, bordered to the south by Kingsbury County. It is 20 miles (32 km) northeast of Iroquois and 25 miles (40 km) south of Clark, the Clark county seat.

== Demographics ==
Historical population
Census	Pop.	Note	%±
2020	92		—
U.S. Decennial Census
