= Silver Lake Colony, South Dakota =

- Census-designated place
- Location within South Dakota Location within the United States
- Coordinates: 44°51′56″N 97°36′30″W
- Country: United States
- State: South Dakota
- County: Clark

Area
  - Total: 0.25 sq mi (0.65 km^{2})
  - Land: 0.24 sq mi (0.61 km^{2})
  - Water: 0.015 sq mi (0.04 km^{2})
- Elevation: 1,785 ft (544 m)

Population (2020)
  - Total: 7
  - Density: 29.5/sq mi (11.39/km^{2})
- Time zone: UTC-6 (Central (CST))
  - Summer (DST): UTC-5 (CDT)
- ZIP Code: 57225 (Clark)
- Area code: 605
- FIPS code: 46-58868
- GNIS feature ID: 2813010

Silver Lake Colony is a Hutterite colony and census-designated place (CDP) in Clark County, South Dakota, United States. The population was 7 at the 2020 census. It was first listed as a CDP prior to the 2020 census.

It is in the eastern part of the county, 6 miles (10 km) east of Clark, the county seat, and 8 miles (13 km) west of Henry.

== Demographics ==
Historical population
Census	Pop.	Note	%±
2020	7		—
U.S. Decennial Census
