= Clark County Courthouse (South Dakota) =

- U.S. National Register of Historic Places
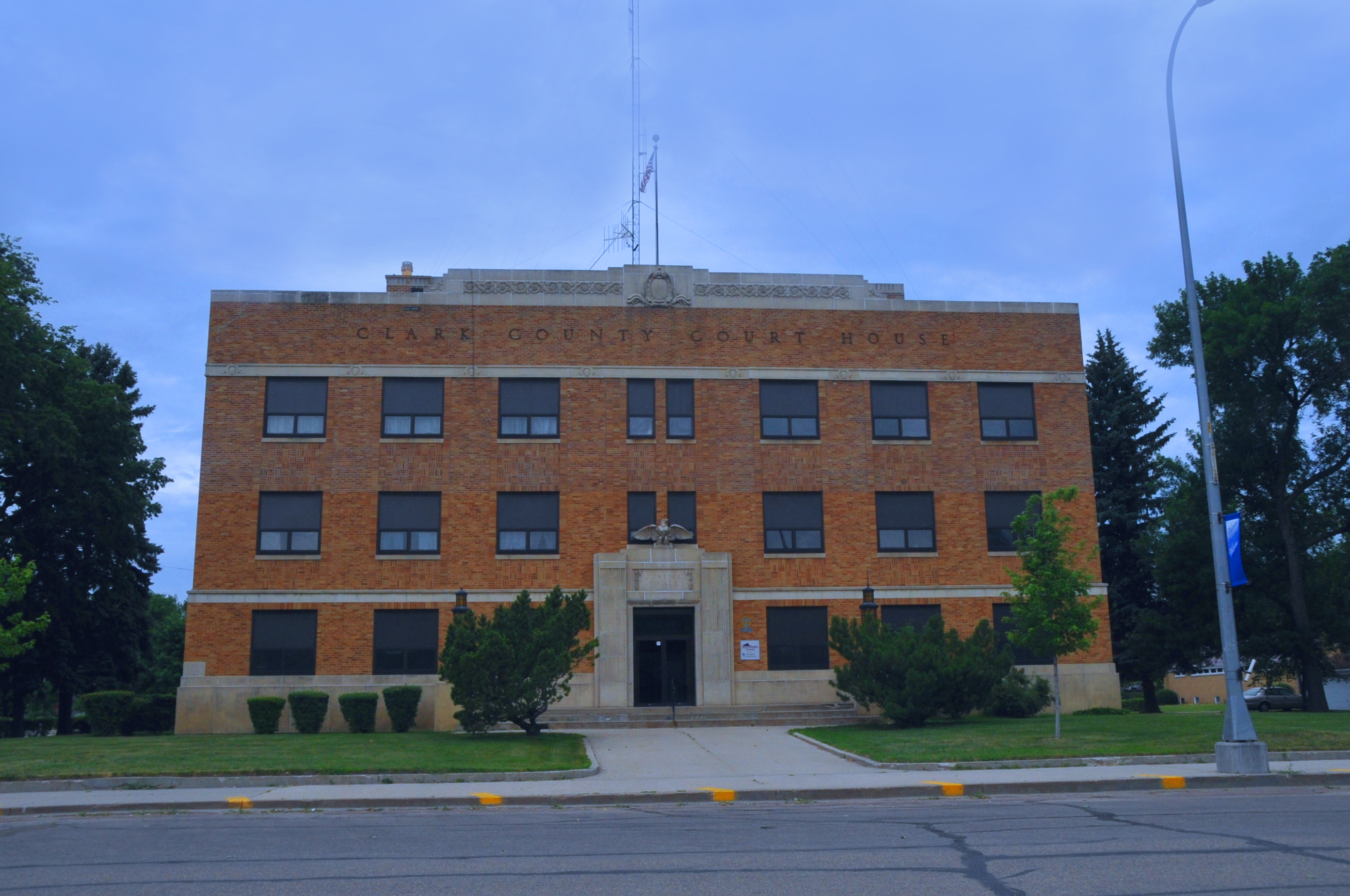

- Location within South Dakota Location within the United States
- Interactive map showing the location of Clark County Courthouse
- Location: 200 N. Commercial St., Clark, South Dakota
- Coordinates: 44°52′45″N 97°44′00″W
- Area: less than one acre
- Built: 1934
- Built by: Gray Construction
- Architect: Hugill & Blatherwick
- Architectural style: Art Deco
- MPS: County Courthouses of South Dakota MPS
- NRHP reference No.: 02000026
- Added to NRHP: February 15, 2002

The Clark County Courthouse at 200 N. Commercial St. in Clark, South Dakota serves Clark County. It was listed on the National Register of Historic Places in 2002.

It is a three-story brick and stone building, designed by Hugill & Blatherwick in Art Deco style and built in 1934. Its interior features pink Tennessee marble.
