= Mayfield Colony, South Dakota =

- Census-designated place
- Location within South Dakota Location within the United States
- Coordinates: 44°41′39″N 97°34′52″W
- Country: United States
- State: South Dakota
- County: Clark

Area
  - Total: 0.26 sq mi (0.67 km^{2})
  - Land: 0.26 sq mi (0.67 km^{2})
  - Water: 0 sq mi (0.00 km^{2})
- Elevation: 1,778 ft (542 m)

Population (2020)
  - Total: 146
  - Density: 565.1/sq mi (218.18/km^{2})
- Time zone: UTC-6 (Central (CST))
  - Summer (DST): UTC-5 (CDT)
- ZIP Code: 57278 (Willow Lake)
- Area code: 605
- FIPS code: 46-41548
- GNIS feature ID: 2813009

Mayfield Colony is a Hutterite colony and census-designated place (CDP) in Clark County, South Dakota, United States. The population was 146 at the 2020 census. It was first listed as a CDP prior to the 2020 census.

It is in the southeast part of the county, on the east shore of Dry Lake Number Two, 8 miles (13 km) northeast of Willow Lake and 22 miles (35 km) southeast of Clark, the county seat.

== Demographics ==
Historical population
Census	Pop.	Note	%±
2020	146		—
U.S. Decennial Census
