= Garden City Opera House =

- U.S. National Register of Historic Places
- Location: First and Railroad Sts., Garden City, South Dakota
- Coordinates: 44.95808°N 97.58293°W
- Area: less than one acre
- Built: 1908
- NRHP reference No.: 88002839
- Added to NRHP: December 20, 1988

The Garden City Opera House, at 1st and Railroad Streets in Garden City, South Dakota, was built in 1908. It was listed on the National Register of Historic Places in 1988.

It was deemed "significant in the area of Entertainment/Recreation, because for eighty years it has served as the community's only auditorium and large central meeting place. Since its construction in 1908, it has been the site of innumerable public functions including plays, dances, banquets, assemblies, fraternal meetings, and games. It is one of only a very few extant authentic historic buildings in the community of Garden City."

It is a two-story wood-frame building on a concrete foundation with a gambrel roof.
