= Fordham Township, Clark County, South Dakota =

Township in Clark County, South Dakota

Coordinates: 44°45′43″N 97°55′00″W

Fordham Township is a township in Clark County, in the U.S. state of South Dakota.

== History ==
Fordham Township has the name of Silas Fordham, a pioneer settler.
