= Presentation Children's Home =

Historic building in Sioux Falls, South Dakota

- U.S. National Register of Historic Places
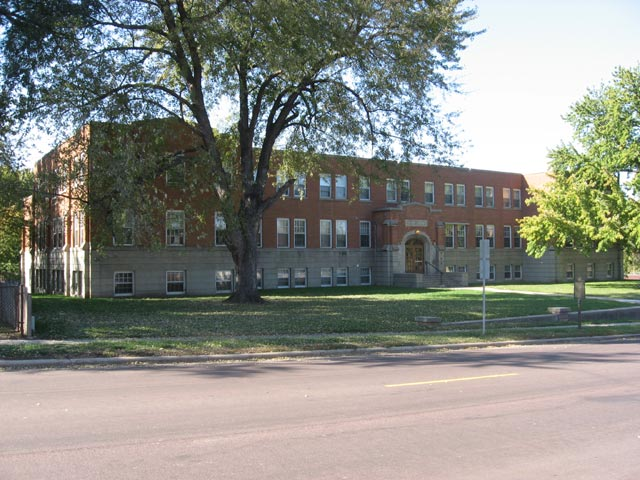
- Presentation Children's Home in 2009

- Location within South Dakota Location within the United States
- Location: 701 South Western Avenue, Sioux Falls, South Dakota
- Coordinates: 43°32′23″N 96°45′04″W
- Area: less than one acre
- Built: 1938–1940
- Built by: Works Progress Administration
- Architect: Hugill & Blatherwick
- Architectural style: Collegiate Gothic
- NRHP reference No.: 92001852
- Added to NRHP: February 10, 1993

The Presentation Children's Home is a historic building at 701 South Western Avenue in Sioux Falls, South Dakota. Built to replace an earlier orphanage in Turton that burned down, it functioned not only as an orphanage—one of the few in South Dakota—but also as a school from its opening in 1940 to its closure in 1966. It was added to the National Register of Historic Places in 1993.

== History ==
=== Background and founding ===
Beginning in 1924, orphans in eastern South Dakota had been homed at the Little Flower orphanage and school in Turton, 160 miles (260 km) north of Sioux Falls. However, when this orphanage burned down in March 1932, the approximately 70 orphans living there were left homeless and were shuffled between various buildings in the subsequent years. Although an orphanage in Sioux Falls—the South Dakota Children's Home—already existed, there was not enough space available to comfortably accommodate the new children. Immediately after the fire, the orphans were temporarily housed at Lincoln Hall on the Northern State University campus in nearby Aberdeen before being moved to Woonsocket in July. The Presentation Order of Sisters, a Roman Catholic mission, had a school there, but the situation was again temporary, and the former Columbus College building in Sioux Falls hosted the children beginning on July 16, 1934. When this college became a seminary in 1938, plans were made to again move the children in August 1939. Boys were sent to the vacant residence of the Bishop Bernard Mahoney, who had previously passed away; and girls were sent to a parochial school in nearby Bridgewater. With the approaching opening of a new, permanent orphanage, the children returned to the seminary building on June 1, 1940.

The Presentation Order of Sisters had, by 1938, appealed to the Works Progress Administration (WPA) for aid to build a permanent orphanage; and in 1938, the City of Sioux Falls in conjunction with the WPA granted the Sisters land rights to the corner of Western Avenue and 15th Street for 99 years. Local architectural firm Hugill & Blatherwick designed the building, and WPA workers provided the labor. The WPA and City of Sioux Falls donated half of the estimated cost—$20,000—to the cause, and the Presentation Order of Sisters held multiple charity drives over the next year to match this amount and complete construction. Struggle to raise these funds during the Great Depression caused completion to be delayed much longer than originally intended; construction lasted from November 10, 1938, to July 26, 1940. Additionally, the city later reduced the contract time from 99 to only 15 years and set a monthly maximum of $20 to be allocated to the care of each child, when cost was not covered by the Presentation Order themselves. This lease was renewed for an additional 99 years on June 11, 1955. The name "Presentation Children's Home" was officially adopted on November 6, 1939. The orphanage officially opened on September 15, 1940.

=== Operation ===
Anywhere from a few dozen to over 100 children were housed at Presentation Children's Home at any one time. The numbers of children hosted there fluctuated according to need. An August 1944 report disclosed that 40 children were then at the home, but throughout 1943, 67 children had stayed there. The building initially claimed that it allowed for a capacity of 150; however, in 1948 and 1955, the home reported that it housed 85 children and was operating at capacity with "a long waiting list".

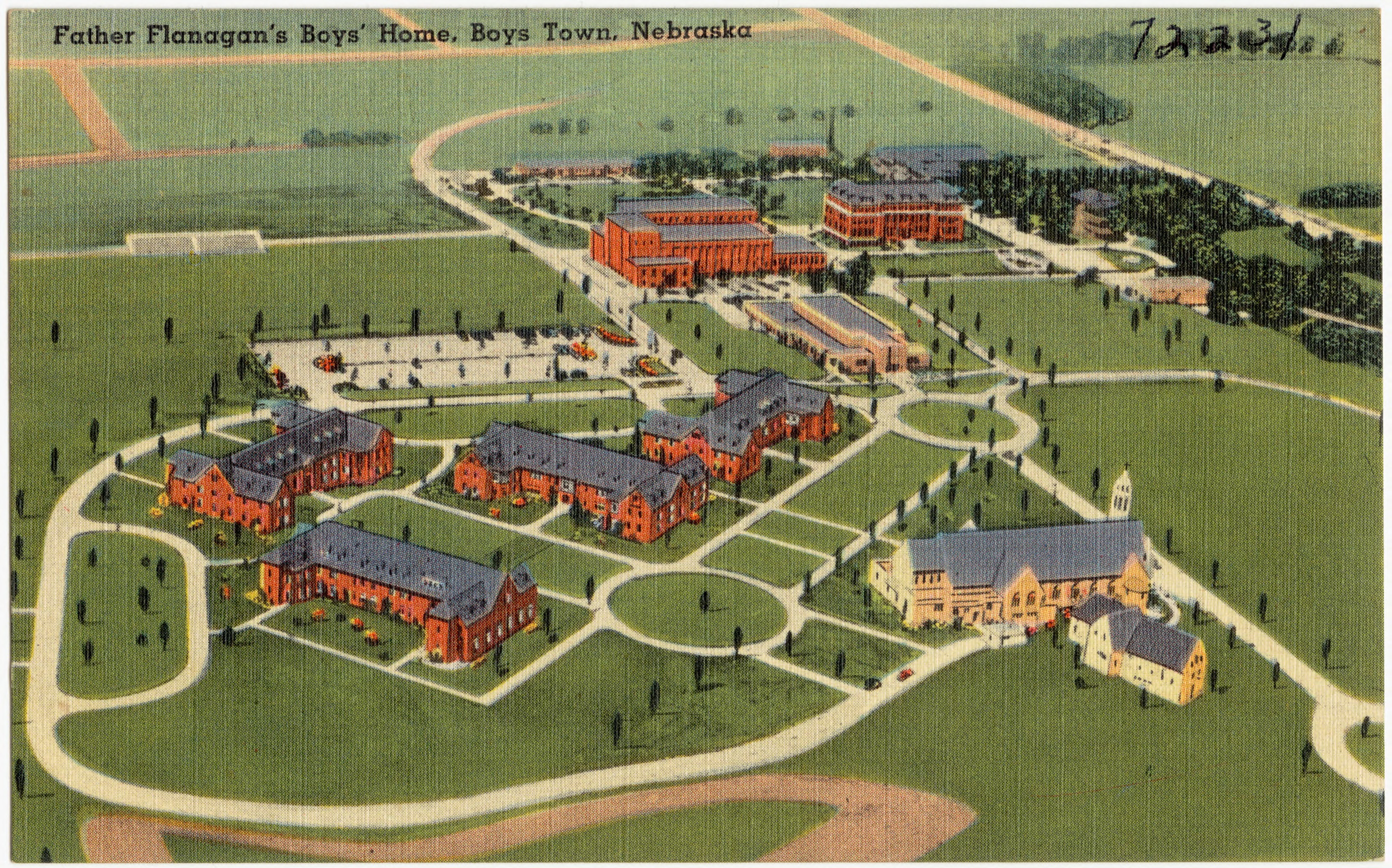
Illustration of Boys Town, where many graduates of the Presentation school were sent

Although the home was run by the Catholic Church, at its opening, about 45% of resident children were from non-Catholic families; and "children of all races, creeds and colors" were admitted. Not all residents had no surviving parents; children from families that could not provide for them were also hosted. In 1943, one nun told the Daily Argus-Leader newspaper that most of the children were from these "broken homes" and at that time, no more than three were truly orphaned. The orphanage hosted children from the ages of 3 to 15, with a few exceptions, such as when deemed necessary by the board to host a younger child to keep a family together. The home provided not just shelter but also education; classes were held at 9 a.m. and lasted until 3:30 p.m., with a break for lunch. Upon reaching the maximum age allowed to stay, children were sent elsewhere. Boys who could not return to their families were hosted at foster homes in the local area or otherwise sent to Boys Town in Omaha, Nebraska; girls were usually sent to Catholic boarding schools in Sioux Falls or the surrounding cities. At opening, the home was staffed by 12 nuns, although public volunteers also helped the staff with chores and events. The home also had both Boy Scouts and Girl Scouts troops. Every December, the home's children put on a Christmas pageant for the public, to thank them for that year's support.

Various local organizations donated funds and supplies to the Presentation Children's Home over the years of its operation. The South Dakota American Legion frequently held toy drives and other charity events for both the Presentation and South Dakota Children's Homes. These included the Sioux Falls Elks Lodge, Knights of Columbus, Junior Chamber of Commerce, Disabled American Veterans, Catholic Daughters of the Americas, El Riad Shriners, John Morrell & Company, and the Otakuye Club of the Young Women's Christian Association. Additionally, the Presentation Children's Home was one of several organizations supported by Sioux Falls's "Community Chest" initiative and, later, the United Fund, which both raised funds for local charities and agencies.

=== Closing and later history ===
By the mid-1960s, enrollment at the home was waning, and the organization was having difficulty finding qualified carers for the children. In 1966, the Presentation Sisters decided the orphanage was no longer needed, and the announcement to close it was made on August 1. The home officially closed on September 2 of that year and the Presentation Sisters entered talks with the city to repurpose the building for education. That October, the Sioux Falls Board of Education decided to use the building as additional classroom space to support overflow from other Sioux Falls schools. It was later used as a college building for the Southeastern Vocational Technical Institute.

On February 10, 1993, the building was listed on the National Register of Historic Places for its architecture and as a product of the Works Progress Administration.

== Architecture ==
The Presentation Children's Home employs elements of Collegiate Gothic architecture, a subcategory of Gothic Revival architecture. It sits on a concrete foundation at the corner of South Western Avenue and 15th Street in central Sioux Falls and faces east. Originally laid out in an H-pattern, its side wings protrude out past its main body. It is three stories tall; the first floor's exterior is encased in eight-course concrete blocks, while the second and third stories are crafted from bonded red bricks up to its concrete-capped parapet. The main entrance protrudes from the front façade; an arched doorway leads to a set of recessed doors, above which is a block of concrete carved with circular motifs. The concrete extends up to the second-floor windows and double as sills; those windows on the third story have separate thin concrete sills. The simple rectangular windows are symmetrical on each face. Pillars extend up the corners of the building's faces and feature triangular concrete buttresses at the bottom of each floor. Built on a hill, the building has two entrances; the back entrance on its west side is actually the basement. Additionally, a concrete retaining wall runs along the east and north sides of the yard, interspersed with Sioux quartzite columns capped in more concrete. The western face includes two extensions as well as a brick chimney. Its flat roof is made of tar and gravel.

Inside, the building was divided up into two wings and a connecting corridor. It contained 93 rooms, including five classrooms, two dormitories, a chapel, an infirmary, a laundry, a library, a kitchen, three dining rooms, several offices. The basement contained a playroom that was used when the weather was not adequate for outside recess; otherwise, the children were allowed to play outside on over 80 acres (32 ha) of yard area. The rooms were simple in design and decor, including the chapel, which contained statuettes of Mother Mary and Saint Joseph.
