= Linden House (Vermillion, South Dakota) =

Historic house in South Dakota, United States

- U.S. National Register of Historic Places
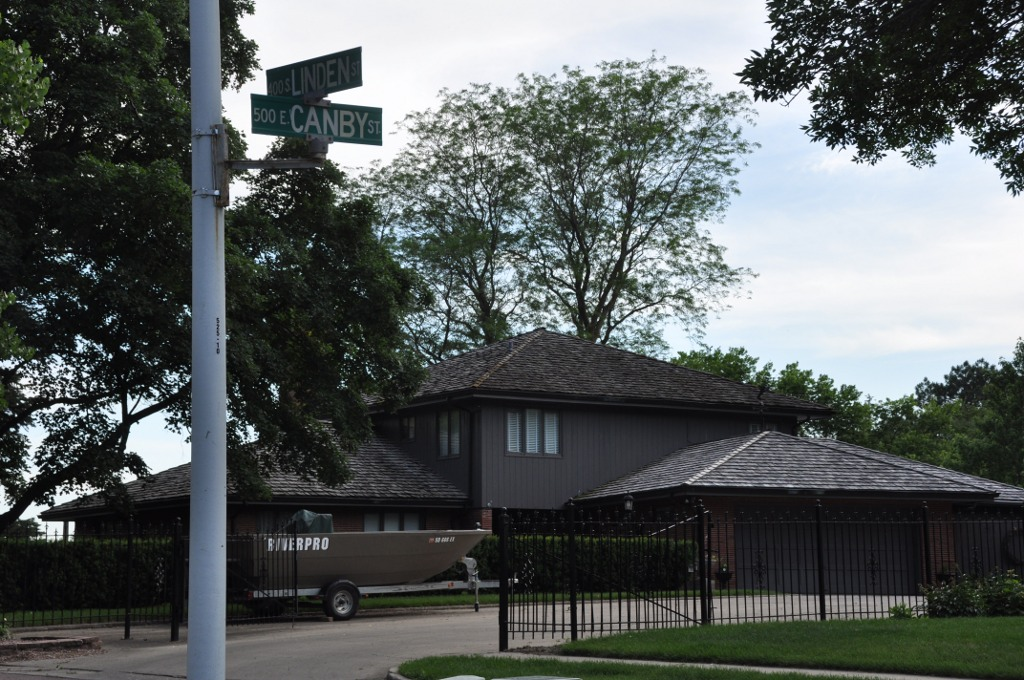

- Location within South Dakota Location within the United States
- Location: 509 Linden Ave., Vermillion, South Dakota
- Coordinates: 42°46′26″N 96°55′24″W
- Built: 1950
- Architect: Hugill, Blatherwick & Fritzel
- Architectural style: Post Modernistic
- NRHP reference No.: 01001001
- Added to NRHP: September 14, 2001

Linden House, built in 1950 in Vermillion, South Dakota, is notable as a rare example of postmodern architecture in South Dakota. It was designed by Sioux City architects Hugill, Blatherwick & Fritzel. It was listed on the National Register of Historic Places in 2001.

The house has a shake cedar roof and brick walls on concrete foundation.
