= Orator Henry LaCraft =

American politician

Orator Henry LaCraft (August 13, 1850 – July 25, 1940) was a member of the South Dakota Senate.

== Biography ==
LaCraft was born on August 13, 1850, in Farmington, Washington County, Wisconsin. He was a direct descendant of pilgrims that journeyed to the continent on the Mayflower.

On April 16, 1873, LaCraft married Charlotte R. Haviland. They had two children before her death on July 17, 1883. LaCraft later married Clara M. Smith on February 25, 1885. They had five children.

== Career ==
LaCraft was a member of the Senate from 1901 to 1904. Additionally, he was a justice of the peace, as well as Postmaster of Clark, South Dakota, and a member of the Clark Board of Education. He was a Republican.
