= History of Sioux Falls, South Dakota =

Sioux Falls is the largest city in the U.S. state of South Dakota. Founded in 1856, the city was abandoned, sacked, resettled and later grew to become a city with a 2020 Census population of 192,517 people.

== Prehistory and exploration ==
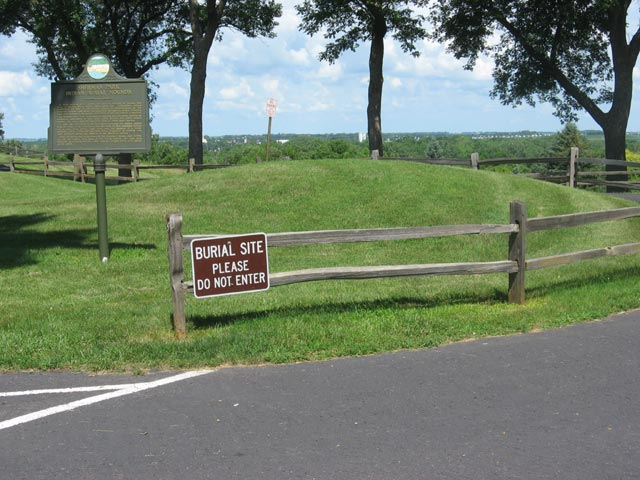
A burial mound in upper Sherman Park

The history of Sioux Falls revolves around the cascades of the Big Sioux River. The falls were created about 14,000 years ago when the last glacial ice sheet redirected the flow of the river into the large looping bends of its present course. Fueled by water from the melting ice, the river exposed the underlying Sioux quartzite bedrock, the hard pinkish stone of the falls. The quartzite itself is about a billion and a half years old. It began as sediments deposited on the bottom of an ancient, shallow sea.

The lure of the falls has been a powerful influence. The prehistoric people who inhabited the region before 500 B.C. left numerous burial mounds on the high bluffs near the river. These people were followed by an agricultural society that built fortified villages on many of the same sites. Tribes of the Lakota and Dakota, widely ranging nomadic bison hunters, arrived sometime around the 18th century. Early maps indicate they used the falls as a place to rendezvous with French fur trappers, considered the first European visitors at the falls.

== Nineteenth century ==
=== Early visitors ===
The falls also drew the attention of early explorers. An August 1804 journal entry of the Lewis and Clark expedition describes the falls of the "Soues River." Famous pathfinder John C. Fremont and French scientist Joseph Nicollet explored the region in 1838 and also wrote a description of the falls. Both are considered second hand accounts rather than evidence of an actual visit.

The first documented visit was by Philander Prescott, an explorer, trader, and trapper who camped overnight at the falls in December 1832. Captain James Allen led a military expedition out of Fort Des Moines in 1844. The early descriptions of the falls were published in The States and Territories of the Great West, an 1856 book by Jacob Ferris which inspired townsite developers to seek out the falls.

=== Founding and Resettlement ===
The focus of intense land speculation activity in Minnesota and Iowa during the mid-1850s inevitably turned toward the Big Sioux River valley. Sioux Falls was founded by land speculators who hoped to build great wealth by claiming prime townsites before the arrival of railroads and settlers.

Two separate groups, the Dakota Land Company of St. Paul and the Western Town Company of Dubuque, Iowa organized in 1856 to claim the land around the falls, considered a promising townsite for its beauty and water power. The Western Town Company arrived first, and was soon followed by the St. Paul–based company in 1857. Each laid out 320-acre (1.3 km^{2}) claims, but worked together for mutual protection. They built a temporary barricade of turf which they dubbed "Fort Sod," in response to hostilities threatened by native tribes. Seventeen men then spent "the first winter" in Sioux Falls. The following year the population grew to near 40.

Historical population
Census	Pop.	Note	%±
1880	2,162		—
1890	10,177		370.7%
1900	10,266		0.9%
1910	14,094		37.3%
1920	25,202		78.8%
1930	33,362		32.4%
1940	40,832		22.4%
1950	52,969		29.7%
1960	65,466		23.6%
1970	72,488		10.7%
1980	81,182		12.0%
1990	100,836		24.2%
2000	123,975		22.9%
2010	153,888		24.1%

Although conflicts in Minnehaha County between Native Americans and white settlers were few, the Dakota War of 1862 engulfed nearby southwestern Minnesota. The town was evacuated in August of that year when two local settlers were killed as a result of the conflict. The settlers and soldiers stationed here traveled to Yankton in late August 1862. The abandoned townsite was pillaged and burned.

Fort Dakota, a military reservation established in present-day downtown, was established in May 1865. Many former settlers gradually returned and a new wave of settlers arrived in the following years. The population grew to 593 by 1873, and a building boom was underway in that year.

=== Incorporation and early growth ===
The Village of Sioux Falls, consisting of 1,200 acres (4.9 km^{2}), was incorporated in 1876 by the 12th legislative assembly of the Dakota Territory, which convened in the territorial capital of Yankton. The village charter proved to be too restrictive, however, and Sioux Falls petitioned to become a city. The city charter was granted by the Dakota Territorial legislature on March 3, 1883.

The arrival of the railroads ushered in the great Dakota Boom decade of the 1880s. The population of Sioux Falls mushroomed from 2,164 in 1880 to 10,167 at the close of the decade. The growth transformed the city. A severe plague of grasshoppers and a national depression halted the boom by the early 1890s. The city grew by only 89 people from 1890 to 1900.

==== Divorce capital of the nation ====
Beginning in the 1880s, a 90-day residency law and lax oversight on the part of local judges concerning sworn testimony caused word to spread across the United States that a legal divorce was easily obtained in Dakota Territory. As a result, both Sioux Falls and Fargo (in later North Dakota) became known as "divorce capitals". Thousands of people traveled to the towns seeking a divorce, with the resulting divorce rate in Minnehaha County during this period being nearly three times that of the national average. Although many local residents were unhappy with the notoriety, the surge of "tourists" necessitated the construction of a number of new hotels and restaurants, and the situation brought a level of attention uncommon for towns of a similar size. Divorce laws were tightened after statehood, and the phenomenon had ended by the early 1900s.

== Twentieth century ==
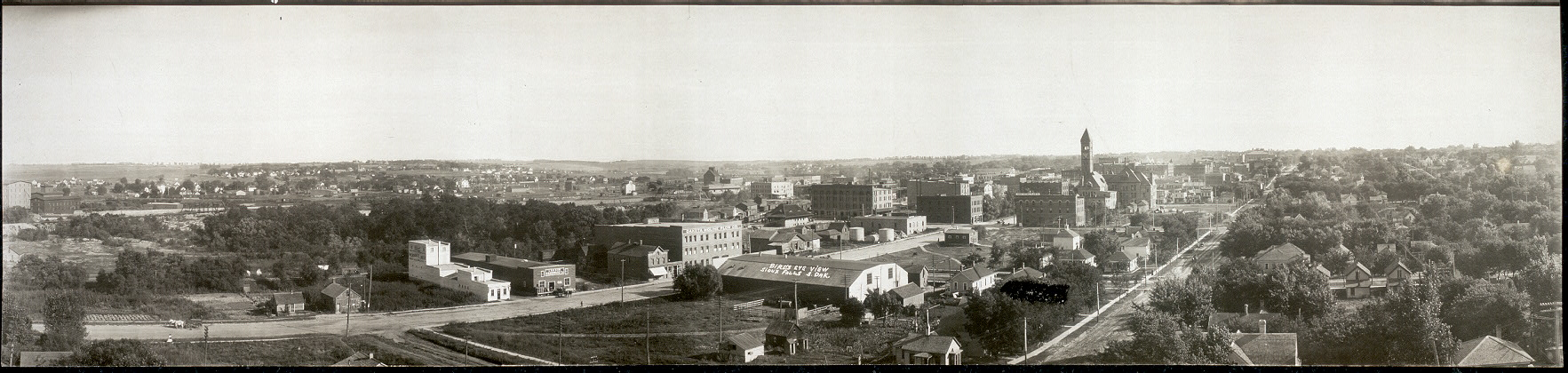
Panoramic view of Sioux Falls in 1907, looking east to south. The Old Minnehaha County Courthouse can be seen at the center right, and the Queen Bee Mill can be seen at the extreme left.

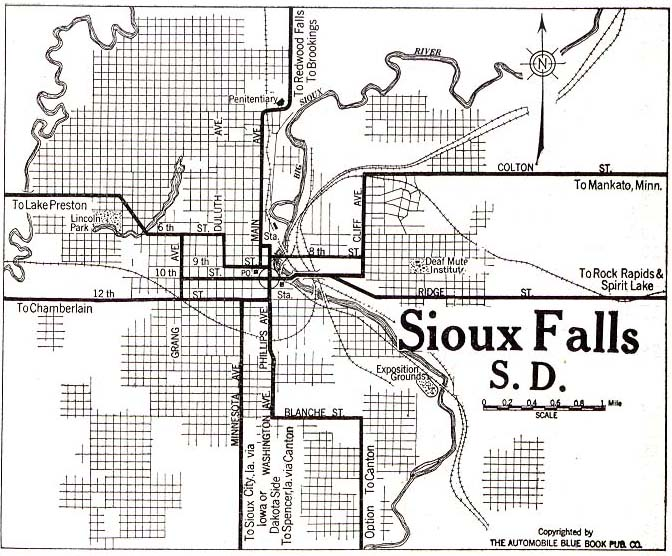
Map of Sioux Falls in 1920

With the opening of the John Morrell meat-packing plant in 1909, the establishment of an airbase and a military radio and communications training school in 1942, and the completion of the interstate highways in the early 1960s, Sioux Falls grew at a moderate but steady pace in the early and middle years of the 20th century. During this period, the city's economy was largely centered on the stockyards and the meat packing industry. Sioux Falls was home to one of the largest stockyards in the nation at the time, and the John Morrell plant was by far the largest employer in the city.

Beginning in the late 20th century, Sioux Falls began growing at a considerably faster pace than during previous decades. The economy became more service-based, and word began to spread about the relatively low levels of unemployment and crime. Annexations of adjacent land in Minnehaha County became common. The first annexation of land south of 57th Street from Lincoln County was in 1969 for a municipal water tower. The next annexations from Lincoln County occurred in 1978 when a couple of new subdivisions were added.

Several large shopping malls opened during the 1970s, and the retail and dining industry began to exert a growing influence on the city's economy. In 1981, Citibank transferred its credit card operations from New York to Sioux Falls to take advantage of recently relaxed state anti-usury laws. Several other financial companies also moved to Sioux Falls or expanded their existing business in the city, resulting in a large present-day banking and financial presence in the city. A third factor contributing to recent growth is the expansion of the local healthcare industry. The two largest hospitals in the city, Sanford Health and Avera Health, are also the two largest present-day employers in the city.

== See also ==
- Timeline of Sioux Falls, South Dakota
