= Lake County Courthouse (South Dakota) =

- U.S. National Register of Historic Places
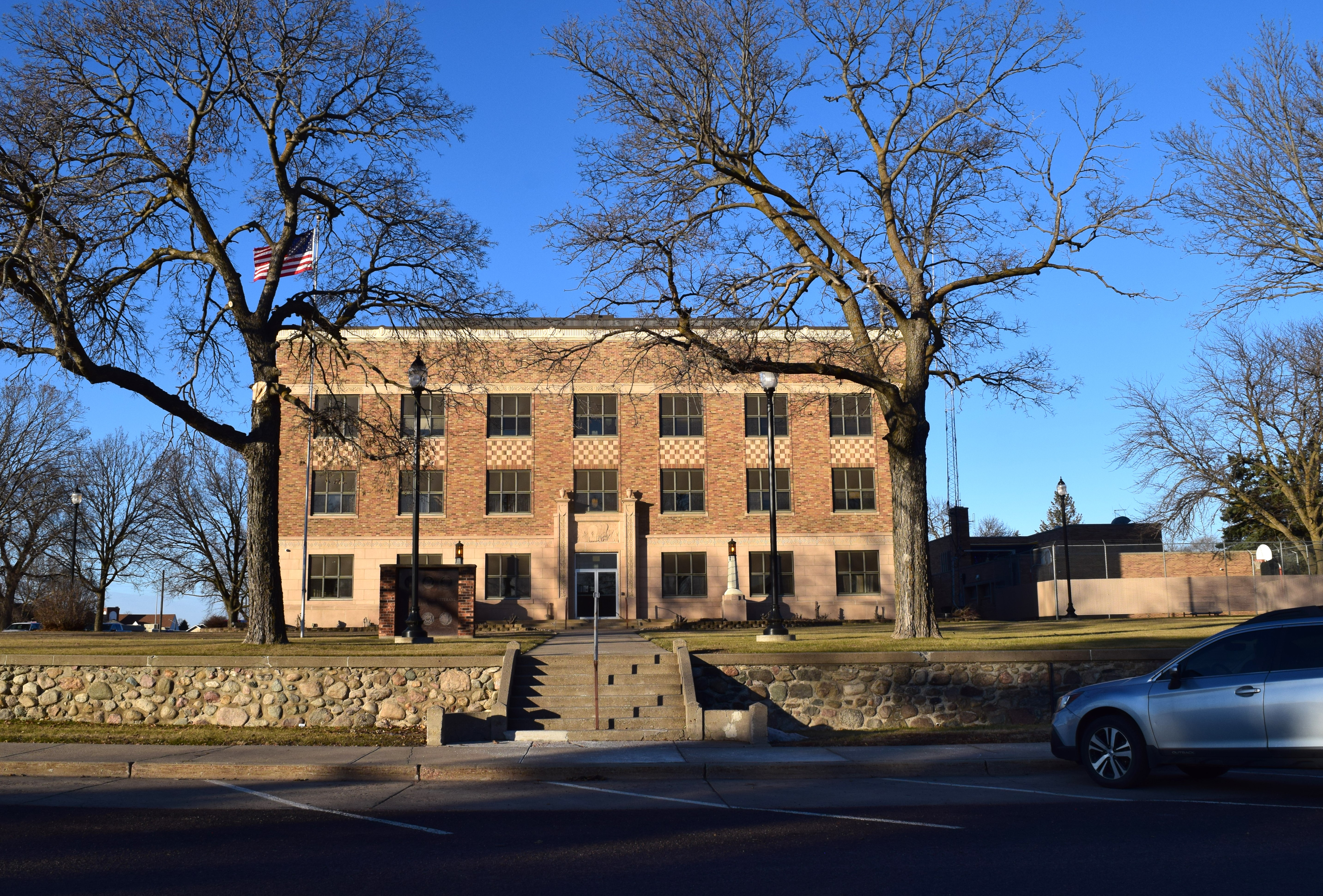

- Location within South Dakota Location within the United States
- Location: Center St. between Harth and Lee Aves., Madison, South Dakota
- Coordinates: 44°00′20″N 97°06′41″W
- Area: less than one acre
- Built: 1935
- Built by: Jonason, S.W., & Co.
- Architect: Hugill & Blatherwick
- Architectural style: Moderne, Art Deco
- MPS: County Courthouses of South Dakota MPS
- NRHP reference No.: 92001861
- Added to NRHP: February 10, 1993

The Lake County Courthouse in Madison, South Dakota was built in 1935. It was listed on the National Register of Historic Places in 1993.

The courthouse is at the center of a square block which also includes a Public Safety Building, which is a jail.

It was designed by architects Hugill & Blatherwick in Art Deco style.
