= Central Church (Sioux Falls, South Dakota) =

Church building in the United States

Coordinates: 43°29′46″N 96°45′40″W

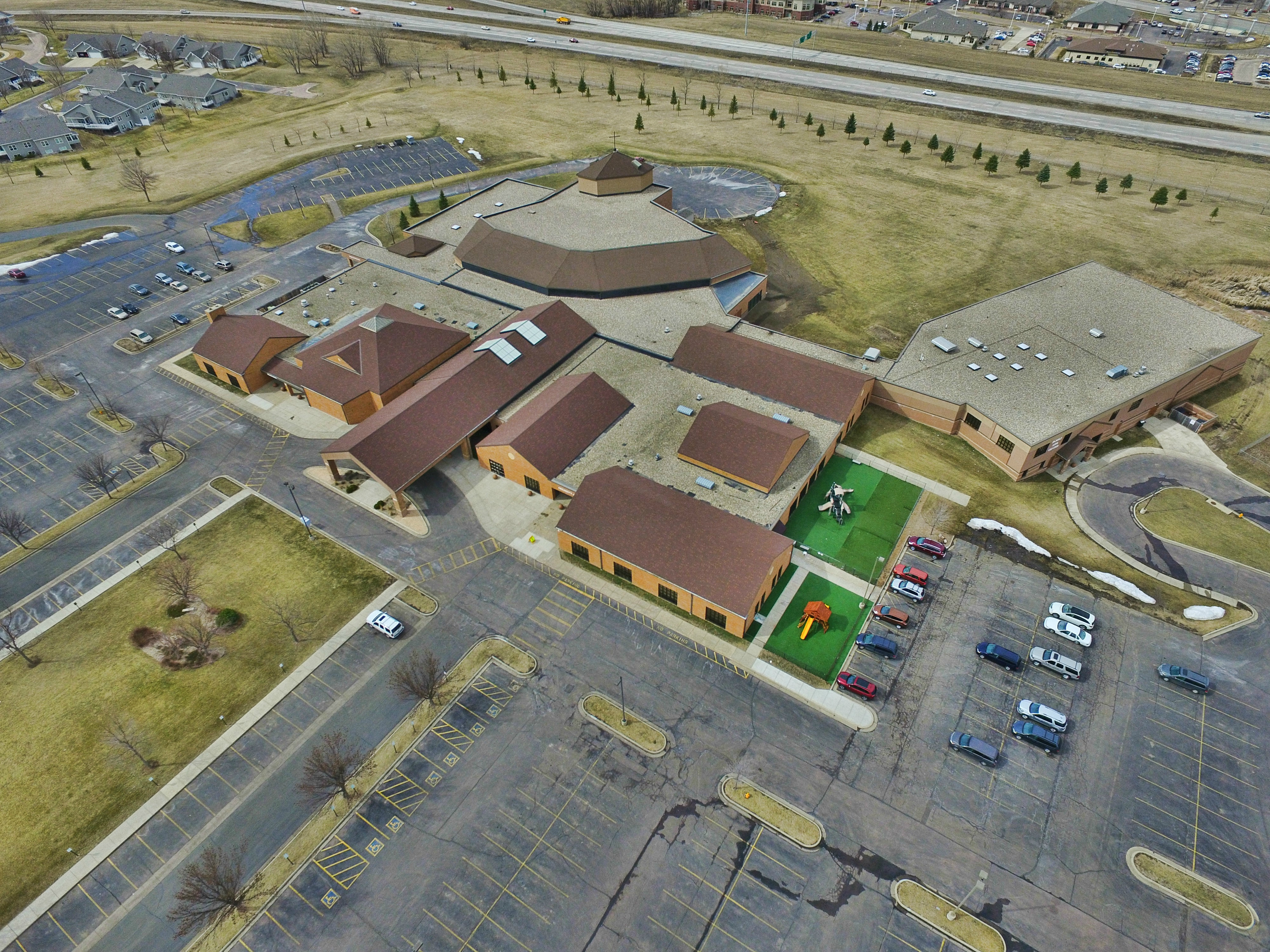
Aerial view of Central Church in Sioux Falls, South Dakota.

Central Church (formerly Central Baptist Church) is a Christian church associated with Converge located in Sioux Falls, South Dakota. The church was founded in 1883 as Swedish Baptist Church and is home to Central Preschool and Kindergarten, the largest preschool in South Dakota. Today they serve the general Sioux Falls area, and have services at 5:00 pm Saturday and 8:30 am, 9:45 am and 11:15 am Sunday.

== History ==
The church was founded in 1883 as Swedish Baptist Church. The church was previously located in facilities on 8th St. and Spring Ave. and, before that, 12th St. and Dakota Ave. The church changed its name to Central Baptist Church in 1920 and Swedish language services were dropped in 1925. The current church building, located on Ralph Rogers Road, was built in 1995 and later expanded in 2006 to include a 1,200-seat sanctuary and a family life center. The first service in the new sanctuary was Christmas of 2006. The new building fully opened in 2007. In 2016, the church changed its name to Central Church but remains associated with Converge International.
