= Josephine Martin Glidden Memorial Chapel =

Historic church in South Dakota, United States

- Glidden, Josephine Martin, Memorial Chapel
- U.S. National Register of Historic Places
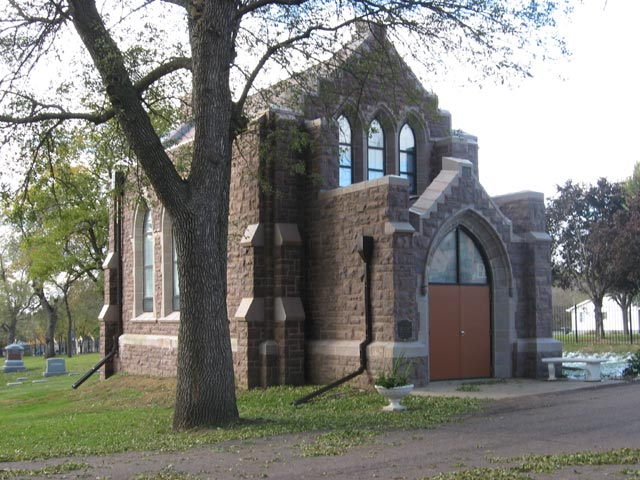

- Location within South Dakota Location within the United States
- Location: 2121 E. Twelfth St., Sioux Falls, South Dakota
- Coordinates: 43°32′37″N 96°41′58″W
- Area: less than one acre
- Built: 1924
- Architect: Hugill & Blatherwick
- Architectural style: Late Gothic Revival
- NRHP reference No.: 87001732
- Added to NRHP: September 25, 1987

The Josephine Martin Glidden Memorial Chapel is a historic church at 2121 E. Twelfth Street in Sioux Falls, South Dakota. It was built in 1924 and was added to the National Register in 1987.

It was deemed notable as "a good example of funerary architecture in a gothic style with Romanesque features."

Located at the entrance to Mt. Pleasant Cemetery, it has also been known as Mt. Pleasant Chapel.

Story of the chapel:

"1904, it was then that Daniel Smith Glidden was asked to serve on the board of trustees for the Mt Pleasant Cemetery Association. Josephine, the more action-oriented member of the Glidden team, became interested in her husband’s responsibilities. In 1912, Daniel passed and Mt Pleasant Cemetery became a regular visiting place for Josephine.

After her death on Christmas Day 1921, it was revealed that Josephine left Mt Pleasant Cemetery Association a gift of $13,000 to build a memorial known as the Glidden Memorial Chapel today.

The cemetery board had been seeking to erect a suitable building in the cemetery for a chapel, lavatory, and shelter house for a number of years, as documented in July 3, 1899 meeting minutes. Body storage was a real problem and a yearly headache for undertakers and cemetery Sextons as it was too hard and too costly to dig graves when the ground was frozen in the winter. On July 15, 1901, it was reported that “the committee appointed to investigated the matter of erecting a chapel and vault-building reports that the cost of such a building is beyond the present ability of the association and the matter is dropped.”

Long-time family friend of the Glidden's and President of the cemetery board at the time, Dennis L McKinney wasted no time in contacting architectural firms and called a special meeting of the board on Feb. 24, 1922. The drawings and ideas of architects Hugill and Blatherwick were accepted with the understanding that the construction costs shall not exceed the sum of $13,000. April 7, 1922, Carlson & Snitky Contractors bid $12,975."
