= Clark County, South Dakota =

County in South Dakota, United States

- County
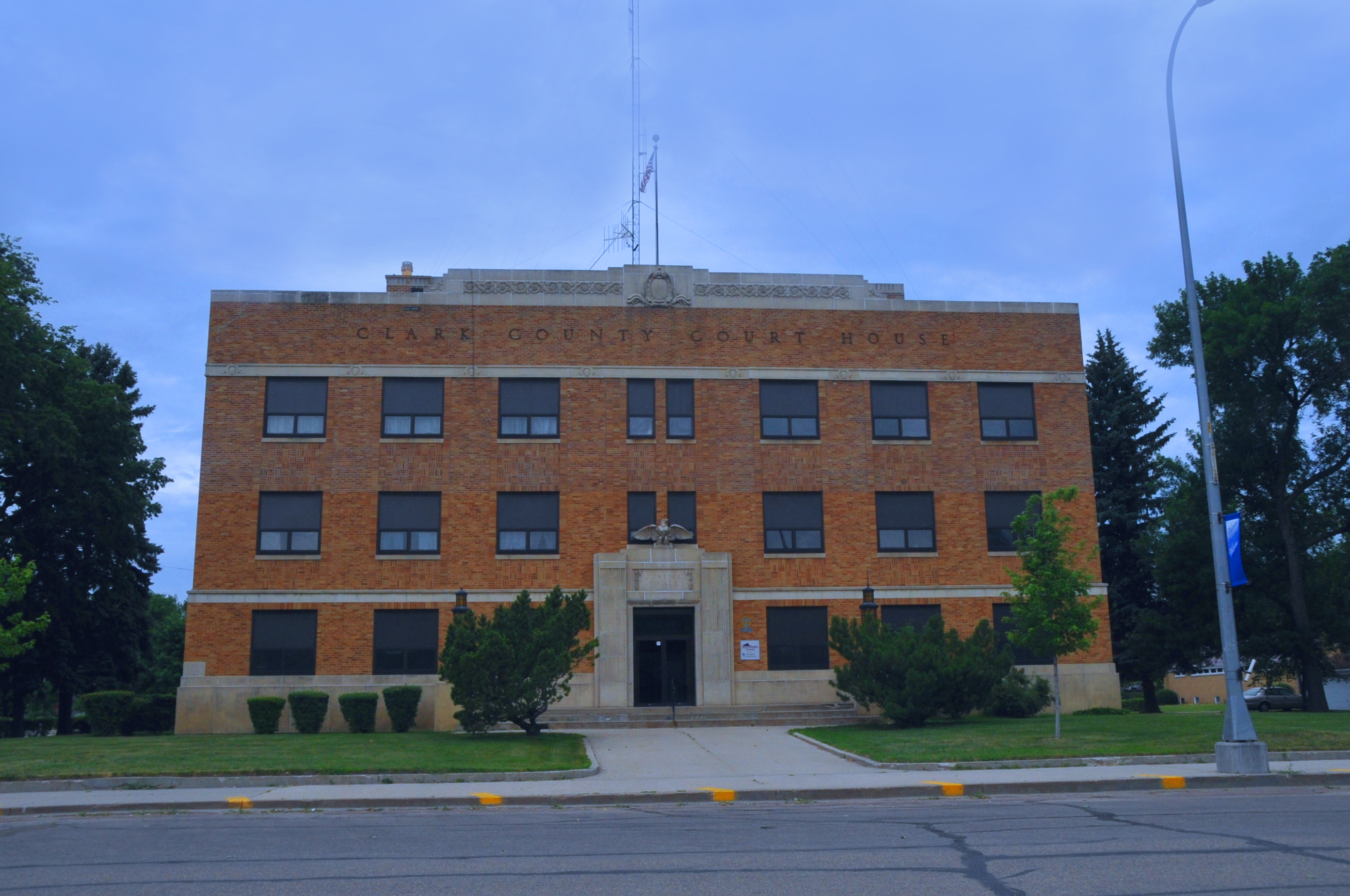
- Clark County Courthouse

- Location within the U.S. state of South Dakota
- Coordinates: 44°52′N 97°44′W
- Country: United States
- State: South Dakota
- Founded: 1873 (created); 1881 (organized)
- Named for: Newton Clark
- Seat: Clark
- Largest city: Clark

Area
  - Total: 967 sq mi (2,500 km^{2})
  - Land: 958 sq mi (2,480 km^{2})
  - Water: 9.9 sq mi (26 km^{2}) 1.0%

Population (2020)
  - Total: 3,837
  - Estimate (2025): 4,031 ▲
  - Density: 4.2/sq mi (1.6/km^{2})
- Time zone: UTC−6 (Central)
  - Summer (DST): UTC−5 (CDT)
- Congressional district: At-large
- Website: http://clark.sdcounties.org/

Clark County is a county in the U.S. state of South Dakota. As of the 2020 census, the population was 3,837. Its county seat is Clark. The county was created in 1873 and organized in 1881. It was named for Newton Clark, a Dakota Territory legislator in 1873.

== Geography ==
Clark County terrain consists of rolling hills, dotted with lakes and ponds especially in the east central portion. The area is mostly devoted to agriculture. The county has a total area of 967 square miles (2,500 km^{2}), of which 958 square miles (2,480 km^{2}) is land and 9.9 square miles (26 km^{2}) (1.0%) is water.

=== Major highways ===
- U.S. Highway 212
- South Dakota Highway 20
- South Dakota Highway 25
- South Dakota Highway 28

=== Adjacent counties ===
- Day County – north
- Codington County – east
- Hamlin County – southeast
- Kingsbury County – south
- Beadle County – southwest
- Spink County – west

=== Protected areas ===
- Christopherson State Public Shooting Area
- Dry Lake Number Two State Public Shooting Area
- Fordham State Public Shooting Area
- McPeek State Public Shooting Area
- Stairs Slough State Public Shooting Area
- Willow Lake State Public Shooting Area

=== Lakes and reservoirs ===
- Baileys Lake
- Dry Lake Number One
- Dry Lake Number Two
- Mud Lake
- Reid Lake
- Swan Lake
- Willow Lake

== Demographics ==
Historical population
Census	Pop.	Note	%±
1880	114		—
1890	6,728		5,801.8%
1900	6,942		3.2%
1910	10,901		57.0%
1920	11,136		2.2%
1930	11,022		−1.0%
1940	8,955		−18.8%
1950	8,369		−6.5%
1960	7,134		−14.8%
1970	5,515		−22.7%
1980	4,894		−11.3%
1990	4,403		−10.0%
2000	4,143		−5.9%
2010	3,691		−10.9%
2020	3,837		4.0%
2025 (est.)	4,031	▲	5.1%
U.S. Decennial Census

=== 2020 census ===
As of the 2020 census, there were 3,837 people, 1,361 households, and 853 families residing in the county. Of the residents, 27.6% were under the age of 18 and 21.2% were 65 years of age or older; the median age was 39.8 years. For every 100 females there were 105.3 males, and for every 100 females age 18 and over there were 101.4 males.

The population density was 4.0 inhabitants per square mile (1.5/km^{2}). There were 1,603 housing units, of which 15.1% were vacant; among occupied housing units, 76.6% were owner-occupied and 23.4% were renter-occupied, with a homeowner vacancy rate of 1.1% and a rental vacancy rate of 5.1%.

The racial makeup of the county was 94.3% White, 0.3% Black or African American, 0.6% American Indian and Alaska Native, 0.2% Asian, 1.7% from some other race, and 2.9% from two or more races. Hispanic or Latino residents of any race comprised 4.4% of the population.

Of the 1,361 households, 25.3% had children under the age of 18 living with them and 20.0% had a female householder with no spouse or partner present. About 33.9% of all households were made up of individuals and 14.5% had someone living alone who was 65 years of age or older.

=== 2010 census ===
As of the 2010 census, there were 3,691 people, 1,445 households, and 929 families residing in the county. The population density was 3.9 inhabitants per square mile (1.5/km^{2}). There were 1,710 housing units at an average density of 1.8 per square mile (0.69/km^{2}). The racial makeup of the county was 98.1% white, 0.2% black or African American, 0.1% Asian, 0.1% American Indian, 0.8% from other races, and 0.8% from two or more races. Those of Hispanic or Latino origin made up 1.7% of the population. In terms of ancestry, 52.0% were German, 29.4% were Norwegian, 9.7% were Irish, 7.8% were English, 5.4% were Swedish, and 3.5% were American.

Of the 1,445 households, 23.0% had children under the age of 18 living with them, 55.8% were married couples living together, 4.8% had a female householder with no husband present, 35.7% were non-families, and 32.5% of all households were made up of individuals. The average household size was 2.22 and the average family size was 2.79. The median age was 45.7 years.

The median income for a household in the county was $43,894 and the median income for a family was $55,575. Males had a median income of $33,606 versus $24,952 for females. The per capita income for the county was $23,909. About 7.5% of families and 13.1% of the population were below the poverty line, including 24.5% of those under age 18 and 12.6% of those age 65 or over.

== Communities ==
=== Cities ===
- Clark (county seat)
- Willow Lake

=== Towns ===
- Bradley
- Garden City
- Naples
- Raymond
- Vienna

=== Census-designated place ===
- Collins Colony
- Crocker
- Fordham Colony
- Hillcrest Colony
- Mayfield Colony
- Silver Lake Colony

=== Unincorporated communities ===
- Carpenter
- Elrod

=== Townships ===
- Ash
- Blaine
- Collins
- Cottonwood
- Darlington
- Day
- Eden
- Fordham
- Foxton
- Garfield
- Hague
- Lake
- Lincoln
- Logan
- Maydell
- Merton
- Mount Pleasant
- Pleasant
- Raymond
- Richland
- Rosedale
- Spring Valley
- Thorp
- Warren
- Washington
- Woodland

== Politics ==
Clark County is a strongly Republican county. The last time it voted Democratic was Lyndon B. Johnson in 1964.

United States presidential election results for Clark County, South Dakota
Year	Republican		Democratic		Third party(ies)	
Year	No.	%	No.	%	No.	%
1892	731	47.19%	197	12.72%	621	40.09%
1896	695	45.01%	816	52.85%	33	2.14%
1900	996	54.16%	752	40.89%	91	4.95%
1904	1,409	73.85%	276	14.47%	223	11.69%
1908	1,234	64.37%	557	29.06%	126	6.57%
1912	0	0.00%	668	38.48%	1,068	61.52%
1916	1,226	52.71%	1,016	43.68%	84	3.61%
1920	1,753	60.24%	437	15.02%	720	24.74%
1924	1,684	56.85%	325	10.97%	953	32.17%
1928	2,665	65.46%	1,370	33.65%	36	0.88%
1932	1,572	36.56%	2,649	61.60%	79	1.84%
1936	1,883	46.07%	2,036	49.82%	168	4.11%
1940	2,622	61.75%	1,624	38.25%	0	0.00%
1944	1,936	61.56%	1,209	38.44%	0	0.00%
1948	1,625	50.59%	1,559	48.54%	28	0.87%
1952	2,692	71.44%	1,076	28.56%	0	0.00%
1956	2,173	58.83%	1,521	41.17%	0	0.00%
1960	2,204	61.05%	1,406	38.95%	0	0.00%
1964	1,511	46.04%	1,771	53.96%	0	0.00%
1968	1,596	52.50%	1,325	43.59%	119	3.91%
1972	1,617	54.59%	1,336	45.10%	9	0.30%
1976	1,449	51.06%	1,376	48.48%	13	0.46%
1980	1,963	67.43%	774	26.59%	174	5.98%
1984	1,748	64.31%	960	35.32%	10	0.37%
1988	1,247	51.44%	1,164	48.02%	13	0.54%
1992	803	33.81%	799	33.64%	773	32.55%
1996	998	44.51%	956	42.64%	288	12.85%
2000	1,272	60.34%	791	37.52%	45	2.13%
2004	1,435	61.67%	875	37.60%	17	0.73%
2008	1,065	54.90%	830	42.78%	45	2.32%
2012	1,067	58.59%	713	39.15%	41	2.25%
2016	1,139	68.74%	398	24.02%	120	7.24%
2020	1,373	74.22%	437	23.62%	40	2.16%
2024	1,382	75.03%	415	22.53%	45	2.44%

== Education ==
School districts include:

- Clark School District 12-2
- De Smet School District 38-2
- Doland School District 56-2
- Groton Area School District 06-6
- Hamlin School District 28-3
- Henry School District 14-2
- Webster School District 18-5
- Willow Lake School District 12-3

== See also ==
- National Register of Historic Places listings in Clark County, South Dakota
