= Zip Feed Tower =

Demolished grain elevator and feed mill in Sioux Falls, South Dakota

Coordinates: 43°33′5.52″N 96°43′22.61″W

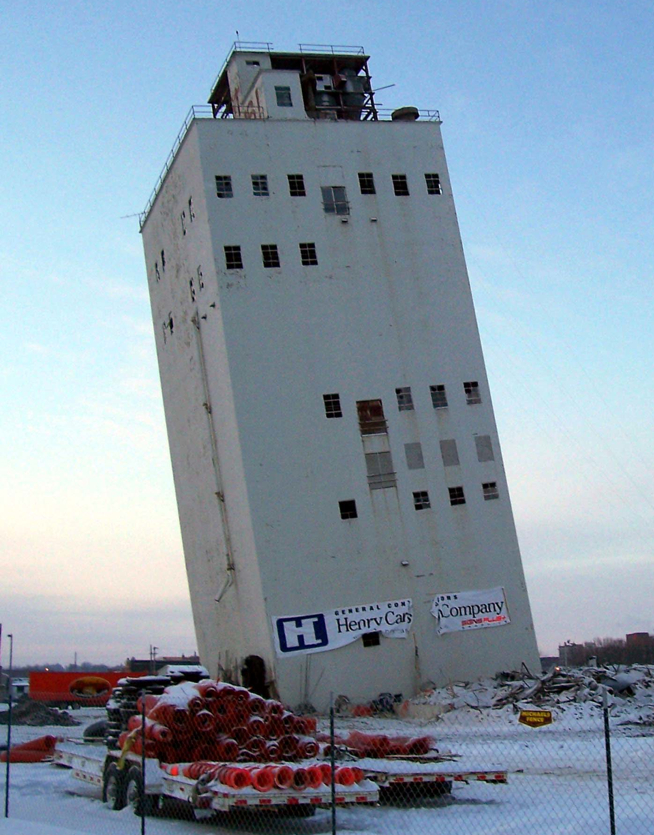
- Zip Feed Mill two days after the attempted demolition

General information
- Location: 300 E Sixth St; Sioux Falls, SD
- Completed: 1957
- Closed: 2000
- Demolished: December 3, 2005; 20 years ago

Height
- Height: 202 ft (62 m)

Technical details
- Material: Concrete

The Zip Feed Tower, also known as the Zip Feed Mill, was a grain elevator and feed mill in Sioux Falls, South Dakota. At 202 feet (62 meters), it was the tallest occupiable structure in South Dakota from its construction in 1956–57 until its demolition in December 2005. The mill closed in 2000 and in 2005 was scheduled for demolition to make way for office and retail space.

== Attempted demolition ==
On December 3, 2005, workers unsuccessfully attempted to implode the building. The concrete tower fell into its own basement, leaning to one side but still standing. Demolition crews had attempted to drop the structure by cutting reinforcing bars throughout the structure, then placing explosive charges in a ring around the base and up between the vertical silos. However, the integrity of the structure was such that, as the base was sheared off, the main structure dropped straight down, crashing through the damaged base and into the basement.

Prior to its planned demolition, the structure's new owner publicized the event as the "Big Boom." In anticipation of the date, a yellow banner reading "BOOM!" and listing the event's website, www.blowzipup.com, was hung from the tower. A crowd gathered in the downtown area of Sioux Falls to watch the demolition of the structure. Following the failed event, the Sioux Falls Canaries promoted a bobble-head depicting the leaning tower, while others made t-shirts depicting the structure. The failed demolition has endured as an iconic event in Sioux Falls history.

A review of the demolition project proved that the crew had seriously underestimated the amount of cutting explosive required to "break" the structure's vertical integrity. Over the next two weeks, a crane and wrecking ball were used to complete the demolition. The tallest building in Sioux Falls today is the 11-story CenturyLink Tower.
