= Hugill (surname) =

People with the surname Hugill:

- Andrew Hugill (born 1957), British composer
- Ashley Hugill (born 1994), English professional snooker player
- George C. Hugill, founder of the Hugill & Blatherwick architectural firm
- Glenn Hugill (born 1970), British television presenter and producer
- John Hugill (1881–1971), Canadian lawyer and politician
- Jordan Hugill (born 1992), English footballer
- Martha Harley Hugill (18th century), British author
- Robert Hugill (composer) (born 1955), English composer
- Stanley James Hugill (1906–1992), English folk singer used stage name Stan Hugill
