= Western Surety Company =

American insurance company

- Industry: Fidelity and Surety Bonds
- Founded: 1900
- Founder: Joe Kirby
- Headquarters: Sioux Falls, South Dakota, United States
- Number of employees: 400
- Parent: CNA Financial
- Website: www.cnasurety.com

Western Surety Company is an insurance company based in Sioux Falls, South Dakota. It was founded in 1900 by attorney Joe Kirby who periodically needed court bonds in connection with his law practice.

Headquartered in Sioux Falls, the company was run for decades by four generations of Kirbys. In the mid 20th century it was one of the larger employers in the city. It was also the national leader in the area of small, miscellaneous fidelity and surety bonds. The company's unique approach focused on service and convenience.

The Kirby family sold the business in 1992 and it is now part of CNA Surety. It still employs several hundred people in downtown Sioux Falls.
