= Security State Bank (Willow Lake, South Dakota) =

- U.S. National Register of Historic Places
- Location within South Dakota Location within the United States
- Location: Garfield St., Willow Lake, South Dakota
- Coordinates: 44°37′45″N 97°38′06″W
- Area: less than one acre
- Built: 1909
- Architectural style: Early Commercial
- NRHP reference No.: 02000577
- Added to NRHP: May 30, 2002

The Security State Bank, on Garfield St. in Willow Lake, South Dakota, was built in 1909. It was listed on the National Register of Historic Places in 2002.

It is a two-story brick commercial building with a flat roof.

It was deemed significant architecturally as "a representative example of an early 20th century commercial building." It was also deemed important "for its contribution to commerce and economic development in Willow Lake, South Dakota. Willow Lake is a rural community whose primary source of economic activity is agricultural. Rural banks of this type were critical for the economic stability of this community and conservatism."
