= Grand Lodge and Library of the Ancient Free and Accepted Masons =

- U.S. National Register of Historic Places
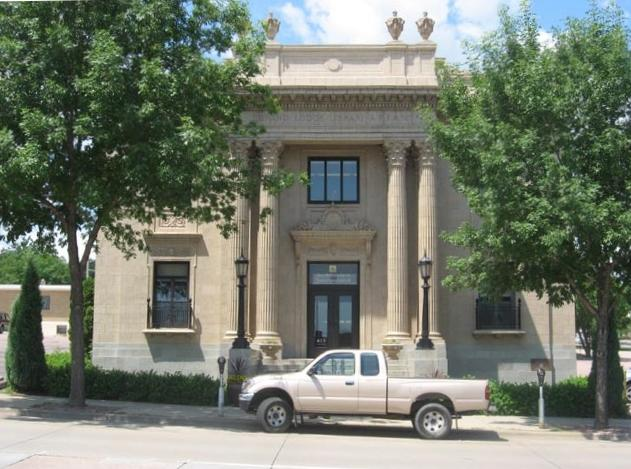

- Location within South Dakota Location within the United States
- Location: 415 S. Main Ave., Sioux Falls, South Dakota
- Coordinates: 43°32′34″N 96°43′42″W
- Area: less than one acre
- Built: 1924
- Architect: Hugill & Blatherwick
- Architectural style: Classical Revival
- NRHP reference No.: 76001750
- Added to NRHP: May 28, 1976

The Grand Lodge and Library of the Ancient Free and Accepted Masons in Sioux Falls, South Dakota is a building from 1924. It was listed on the National Register of Historic Places in 1976. The architects were Hugill & Blatherwick of Sioux Falls.

The National Register nomination describes its importance as "the purest example of Neo-classic style in Sioux Falls. The combination of classic elements and internal structural innovations of the early twentieth century, such as steel doors and trim painted to resemble wood and a nine-ton glass floor, enhance the architectural importance of the structure. The use of steel and glass were unique at that time in the city."

The building has one of the largest Masonic libraries in the United States. The library has more than 22,000 volumes. The building also has a museum on its second floor.
