= Joe Kirby =

American lawyer

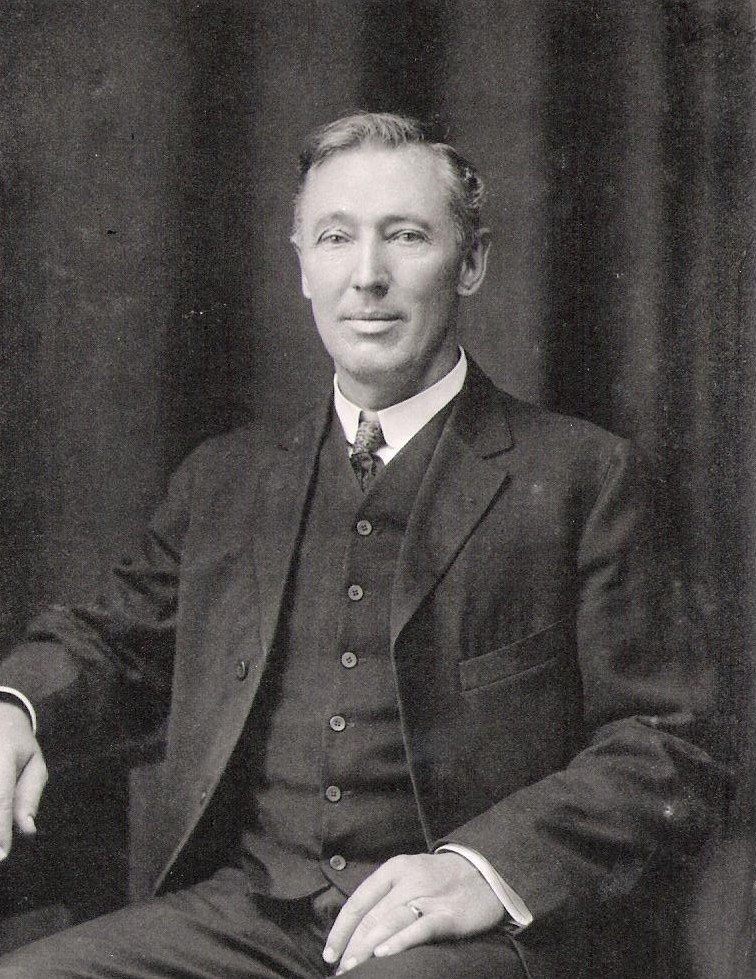
Joe Kirby circa 1915

Joe Kirby (October 5, 1863 - February 8, 1926) was a self-educated son of Irish immigrants who became an important figure in South Dakota history. He helped shape South Dakota law in its formative years, started one of the preeminent law offices in the area in the late 19th and early 20th centuries where numerous future lawyers and judges got their start, founded Western Surety Company and participated in the creation of several other businesses.

Joe Kirby was born to Irish immigrants Patrick and Mary Ryan Kirby on October 5, 1863 in Lawler, Iowa. He attended the early grades of school locally, but there was no high school available in the area. He and some acquaintances used the local grade school facilities to educate themselves during evenings. After finishing his high school education, he worked on his father's farm, taught district school, and studied law a little in New Hampton, Iowa. At that time, neither law school nor even college were required in order to practice law; the only requirement was the test, which he took and passed.

Kirby quickly established himself as a lawyer. He moved from Chickasaw County, Iowa to Sioux Falls in the Dakota Territory, arriving on June 28, 1886. He worked on farms along the way for a meal and a bed. He was admitted to practice in the Dakota Territory on November 12, 1886. He hoped to work at the Bailey and Davis law firm but couldn't get in, so he went to work for a farmer near Montrose for the summer. In the fall he joined the firm. Two years later, in 1888, he opened his own firm on the northwest corner at 9th and Phillips in downtown Sioux Falls.

The 6'3" Kirby had a reputation as a hard working advocate. According to an 1899 historian, "there is not a more untiring, indefatigable and persistent (right or wrong) lawyer in the city of Sioux Falls." His son, Dan, recalled that, "he was a studious person." With extensive experience handling appeals, he was often brought in by area attorneys to take cases to higher courts. He appeared in front of the state's Supreme Court countless times, and the U.S. Supreme Court at least six times, which is something few attorneys experience. In the Baltzer case, Kirby was the first attorney to present arguments to the US Supreme Court challenging the constitutionality of the Espionage Act of 1917. The importance of that case in the development of First Amendment legal theory in the United States has only recently been discovered by legal scholars.

Kirby provided a sound legal education to many aspiring young men, several of whom became outstanding area lawyers. In the words of his son, Dan, "He probably contributed more to the law in South Dakota than anybody else of his time." The firm served as an important stepping stone for many successful individuals. The list of associates during the firm's most active decades includes several judges, Clare Rodarrick who was later the state's attorney general and the president of the Chicago Northwestern Railroad, Charles A. Christopherson who served in Congress (1919-1933) and William Bulow of Beresford who was the state's 12th governor (1927-1931) and a U. S. Senator (1931-1943). Both Christopherson and Bulow worked for Kirby in 1893.

Joe Kirby married Ella McMahon on February 4, 1891 in Waucoma, Iowa, her home town. They had five children; Patrick, Joe H., Tom, Dan and Alice. All four sons became lawyers. The family lived in a quartzite block home on the south-east corner of 6th and Duluth, just west of downtown Sioux Falls.

Kirby was an entrepreneur who was involved in the creation of numerous businesses, many of which would endure long after his death. He started his own successful law office. He helped found the South Dakota Central Railway which ran between Sioux Falls and Watertown and served as its vice president and attorney. He was a long-time director of the Minnehaha National Bank (now First National Bank in Sioux Falls) starting in 1918 when it was founded. But his most successful commercial creation occurred with the founding of Western Surety Company.

In 1900, Kirby founded a surety bond company to provide the court bonds he and other lawyers needed in connection with the practice of law. The only source of those bonds was a handful of companies on the East Coast and they couldn't provide fast service. He learned about the surety business from fellow passengers on a train while back east attending a hearing at the U.S. Supreme Court. Western Surety Company went on to become an important business in the state and a national leader in the area of small fidelity and surety bonds.

Joe Kirby died at home on February 8, 1926 at age 62. The records show that he had more cases pending before the state Supreme Court than all the other lawyers in the state combined when he died. He was recognized in several South Dakota histories, most recently the 1989 Argus Leader publication South Dakota 99 which profiled "99 people who significantly contributed to South Dakota's history." He was inducted into the South Dakota Hall of Fame in 1993.
