= Ziebach County Courthouse =

- U.S. National Register of Historic Places
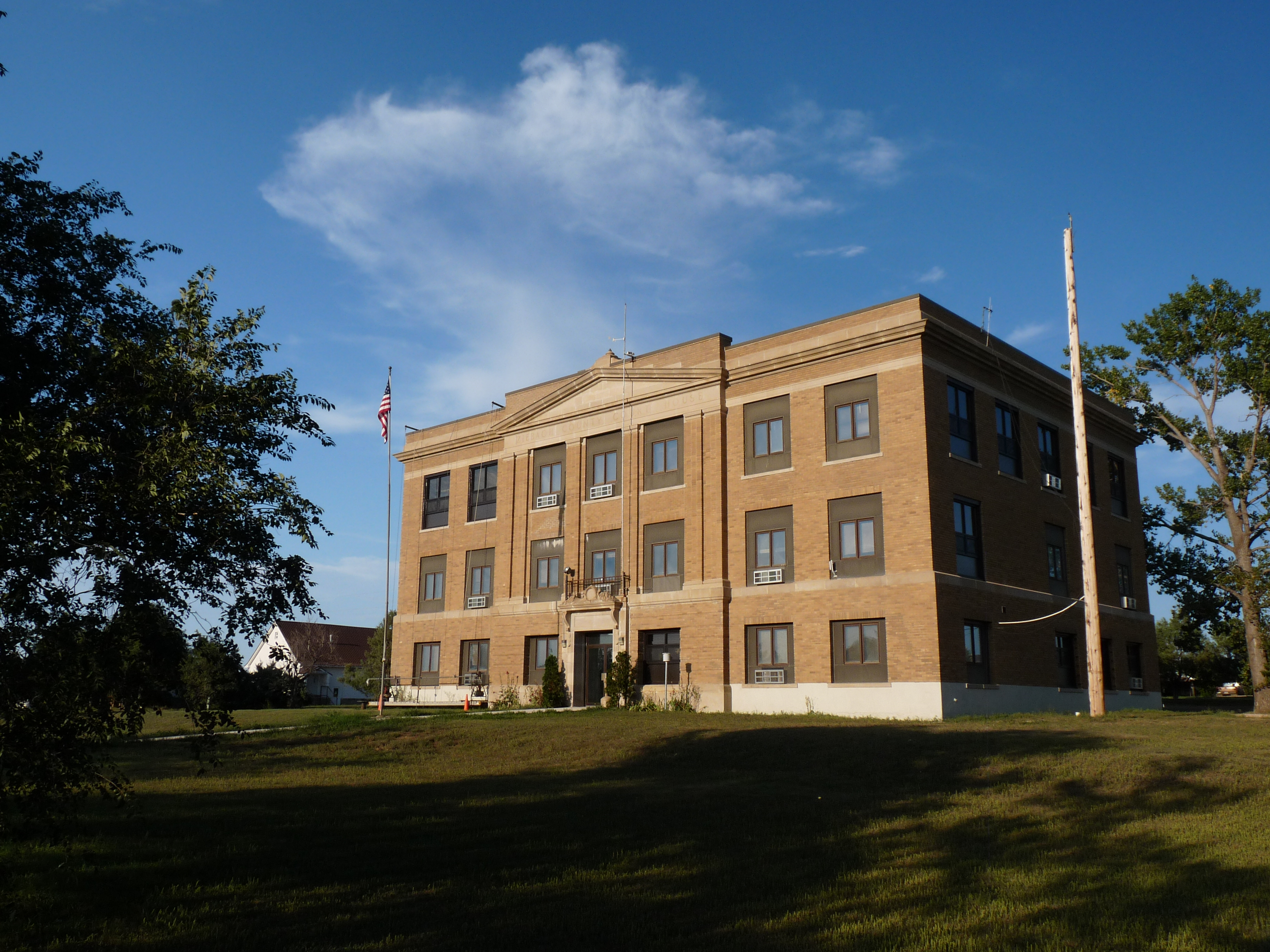

- Location within South Dakota Location within the United States
- Interactive map showing the location of Ziebach County Courthouse
- Location: Main St. between Second and Third Sts., Dupree, South Dakota
- Coordinates: 45°2′49″N 101°36′6″W
- Area: less than one acre
- Built: 1931
- Architect: Hugill & Blatherwick; Clocksin, A.J.
- Architectural style: Classical Revival
- MPS: County Courthouses of South Dakota MPS
- NRHP reference No.: 92001864
- Added to NRHP: February 10, 1993

The Ziebach County Courthouse is located on Main Street in Dupree, the county seat of Ziebach County, South Dakota. It is a three-story structure, faced in brick, with modest Classical Revival styling. It was designed by Hugill and Blatherwick of Sioux Falls and built in 1931–32, replacing inadequate and deteriorating facilities that included the county's first courthouse, built in 1911. The building is roughly rectangular in shape, divided into three sections, one of which projects slightly. The appearance of this section is one of a portico, with pilasters supporting a triangular gabled pediment. The building is, despite its relative architectural simplicity, one of the largest and most architecturally distinctive buildings in the county, and has housed most of the county offices and court facilities since its construction.

The courthouse was listed on the National Register of Historic Places in 1993.

== See also ==
- National Register of Historic Places listings in Ziebach County, South Dakota
