= CenturyLink Tower =

Office skyscraper building located in downtown Sioux Falls, South Dakota

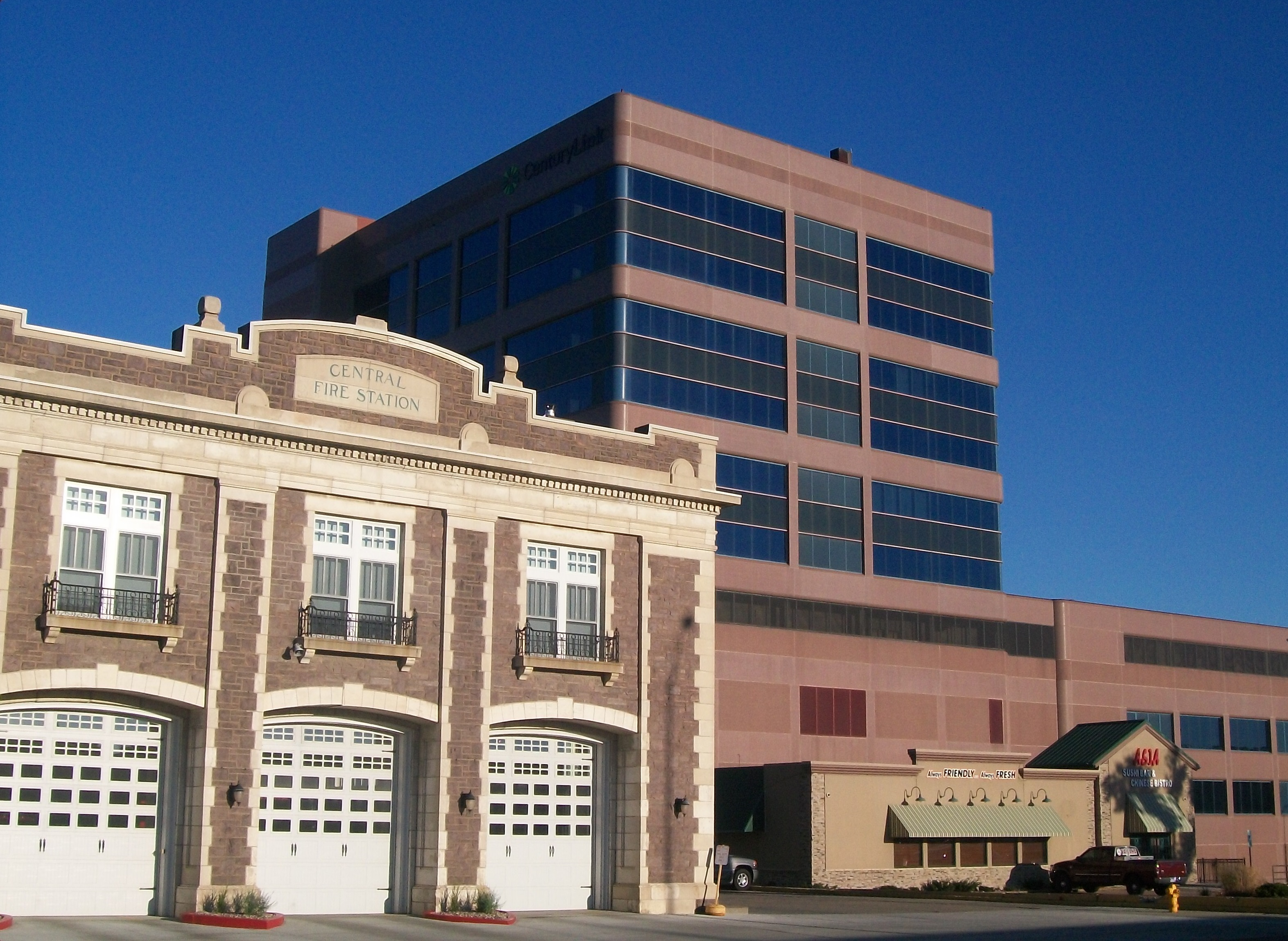
- CenturyLink Tower in 2013

Record height
- Tallest in South Dakota since 2005^{[I]}
- Preceded by: Zip Feed Tower

General information
- Type: Corporate offices
- Location: Sioux Falls, South Dakota
- Coordinates: 43°32′48″N 96°43′49″W
- Completed: 1971

Height
- Roof: 174 ft (53 m)

Technical details
- Floor count: 11
- Lifts/elevators: 6

Design and construction
- Architecture firm: Fritzel, Kroeger, Griffin & Berg
- Main contractor: Henry Carlson Company

Other information
- Public transit: Sioux Area Metro

CenturyLink Tower (formerly Qwest Tower) is a 296,448 sq ft (27,540.9 m^{2}) office building located in downtown Sioux Falls, South Dakota. At 174 ft (53 m) and 11 stories tall, it is the tallest building in the state of South Dakota. Previously, the 202 ft (62 m) Zip Feed Tower was the tallest building in the state.

== History and appearance ==
The building has had two different facades; initially it was of white stone, but structural issues that soon developed forced US West (later known as Qwest) to remove the outer facade and later install the present exterior. One portion of this building was actually constructed of brick and was the original telephone exchange building until its demolition in 2011 to make room for expanded parking.

== Modern ownership ==
The building is now a dispatch center owned by CenturyLink.

== See also ==
- List of tallest buildings by U.S. state
