= Dupree, South Dakota =

Dupree, South Dakota Duplí (Lakota)
- City
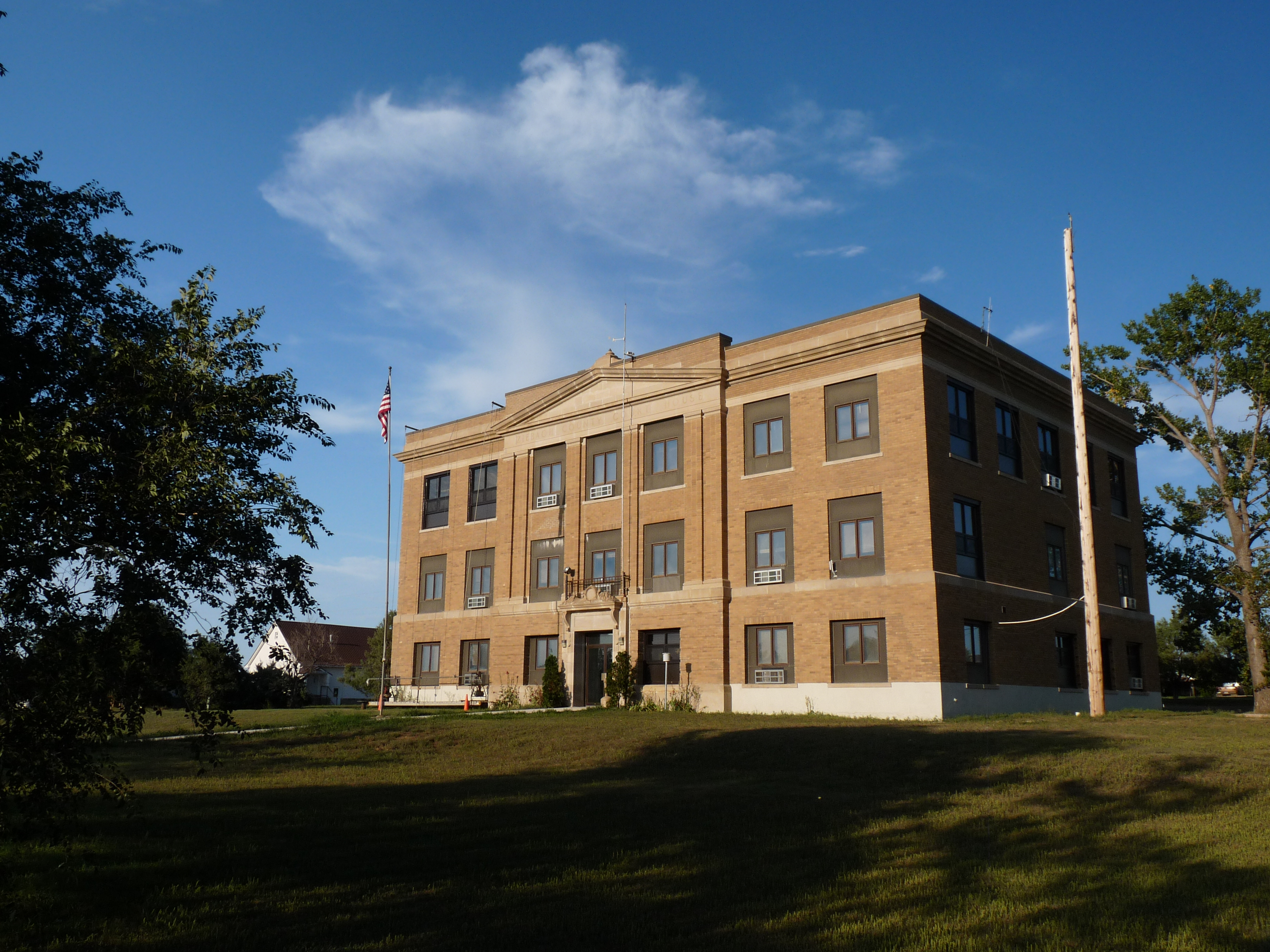
- Ziebach County Courthouse

- Location in Ziebach County and the state of South Dakota
- Coordinates: 45°02′58″N 101°36′05″W
- Country: United States
- State: South Dakota
- County: Ziebach
- Incorporated: 1911

Government
  - Mayor: Don Howe

Area
  - Total: 0.39 sq mi (1.02 km^{2})
  - Land: 0.39 sq mi (1.02 km^{2})
  - Water: 0 sq mi (0.00 km^{2})
- Elevation: 2,369 ft (722 m)

Population (2020)
  - Total: 494
  - Density: 1,260.5/sq mi (486.67/km^{2})
- Time zone: UTC-7 (Mountain (MST))
  - Summer (DST): UTC-6 (MDT)
- ZIP code: 57623
- Area code: 605
- FIPS code: 46-17420
- GNIS feature ID: 1267359

Dupree is a city in and county seat of Ziebach County, South Dakota, United States. The population was 494 at the 2020 census. It is the only incorporated community located fully within Ziebach County.

== History ==
Dupree got its start in 1910, following construction of the Milwaukee Railroad through the territory. The city derives its name from Fred Dupris, a pioneer settler.

== Geography ==
According to the United States Census Bureau, the city has a total area of 0.39 square miles (1.01 km^{2}), all land.

=== Climate ===
Climate data for Dupree, South Dakota (1991–2020 normals, extremes 1922–present)
Month	Jan	Feb	Mar	Apr	May	Jun	Jul	Aug	Sep	Oct	Nov	Dec	Year
Record high °F (°C)	68 (20)	72 (22)	83 (28)	96 (36)	107 (42)	110 (43)	114 (46)	110 (43)	107 (42)	97 (36)	79 (26)	71 (22)	114 (46)
Mean maximum °F (°C)	52.0 (11.1)	55.8 (13.2)	70.1 (21.2)	81.2 (27.3)	87.8 (31.0)	94.7 (34.8)	100.9 (38.3)	100.5 (38.1)	96.0 (35.6)	84.4 (29.1)	67.1 (19.5)	53.9 (12.2)	102.7 (39.3)
Mean daily maximum °F (°C)	31.4 (−0.3)	35.1 (1.7)	47.9 (8.8)	60.7 (15.9)	71.7 (22.1)	82.3 (27.9)	90.2 (32.3)	89.5 (31.9)	80.0 (26.7)	62.6 (17.0)	46.2 (7.9)	34.2 (1.2)	61.0 (16.1)
Daily mean °F (°C)	20.6 (−6.3)	24.1 (−4.4)	35.2 (1.8)	46.8 (8.2)	57.9 (14.4)	68.3 (20.2)	75.2 (24.0)	73.9 (23.3)	64.4 (18.0)	49.1 (9.5)	34.6 (1.4)	23.7 (−4.6)	47.8 (8.8)
Mean daily minimum °F (°C)	9.8 (−12.3)	13.1 (−10.5)	22.5 (−5.3)	32.9 (0.5)	44.0 (6.7)	54.3 (12.4)	60.2 (15.7)	58.3 (14.6)	48.8 (9.3)	35.6 (2.0)	23.1 (−4.9)	13.3 (−10.4)	34.7 (1.5)
Mean minimum °F (°C)	−16.8 (−27.1)	−10.7 (−23.7)	−1.7 (−18.7)	14.0 (−10.0)	27.5 (−2.5)	41.2 (5.1)	48.0 (8.9)	44.6 (7.0)	31.5 (−0.3)	15.6 (−9.1)	2.2 (−16.6)	−10.4 (−23.6)	−22.1 (−30.1)
Record low °F (°C)	−39 (−39)	−35 (−37)	−31 (−35)	−7 (−22)	18 (−8)	31 (−1)	38 (3)	34 (1)	8 (−13)	−11 (−24)	−22 (−30)	−34 (−37)	−39 (−39)
Average precipitation inches (mm)	0.41 (10)	0.59 (15)	0.85 (22)	1.98 (50)	3.27 (83)	3.72 (94)	2.49 (63)	1.79 (45)	1.22 (31)	1.60 (41)	0.43 (11)	0.50 (13)	18.85 (479)
Average snowfall inches (cm)	5.4 (14)	8.2 (21)	6.0 (15)	6.8 (17)	0.5 (1.3)	0.0 (0.0)	0.0 (0.0)	0.0 (0.0)	0.0 (0.0)	2.3 (5.8)	3.4 (8.6)	8.1 (21)	40.7 (103)
Average precipitation days (≥ 0.01 in)	3.7	4.0	4.4	7.2	9.2	9.7	7.6	6.1	4.6	5.3	3.6	3.8	69.2
Average snowy days (≥ 0.1 in)	3.4	3.3	2.5	1.6	0.2	0.0	0.0	0.0	0.0	0.8	2.4	3.1	17.3
Source: NOAA

== Demographics ==
Historical population
Census	Pop.	Note	%±
1920	213		—
1930	365		71.4%
1940	460		26.0%
1950	438		−4.8%
1960	548		25.1%
1970	523		−4.6%
1980	562		7.5%
1990	484		−13.9%
2000	434		−10.3%
2010	525		21.0%
2020	494		−5.9%
U.S. Decennial Census

=== 2020 census ===
As of the 2020 census, Dupree had a population of 494. The median age was 31.3 years, with 31.2% of residents under the age of 18 and 14.8% who were 65 years of age or older. For every 100 females there were 97.6 males, and for every 100 females age 18 and over there were 98.8 males age 18 and over.

0.0% of residents lived in urban areas, while 100.0% lived in rural areas.

There were 158 households in Dupree, of which 46.8% had children under the age of 18 living in them. Of all households, 28.5% were married-couple households, 23.4% were households with a male householder and no spouse or partner present, and 34.8% were households with a female householder and no spouse or partner present. About 29.1% of all households were made up of individuals and 13.3% had someone living alone who was 65 years of age or older.

There were 185 housing units, of which 14.6% were vacant. The homeowner vacancy rate was 0.0% and the rental vacancy rate was 12.8%.

Racial composition as of the 2020 census
Race	Number	Percent
White	72	14.6%
Black or African American	0	0.0%
American Indian and Alaska Native	410	83.0%
Asian	0	0.0%
Native Hawaiian and Other Pacific Islander	0	0.0%
Some other race	0	0.0%
Two or more races	12	2.4%
Hispanic or Latino (of any race)	9	1.8%

=== 2010 census ===
As of the census of 2010, there were 525 people, 176 households, and 116 families residing in the city. The population density was 1,346.2 inhabitants per square mile (519.8/km^{2}). There were 203 housing units at an average density of 520.5 per square mile (201.0/km^{2}). The racial makeup of the city was 29.3% White, 66.9% Native American, 0.4% from other races, and 3.4% from two or more races. Hispanic or Latino of any race were 4.2% of the population.

There were 176 households, of which 44.9% had children under the age of 18 living with them, 38.1% were married couples living together, 21.6% had a female householder with no husband present, 6.3% had a male householder with no wife present, and 34.1% were non-families. 31.8% of all households were made up of individuals, and 10.8% had someone living alone who was 65 years of age or older. The average household size was 2.98 and the average family size was 3.83.

The median age in the city was 27.6 years. 37.3% of residents were under the age of 18; 9% were between the ages of 18 and 24; 22% were from 25 to 44; 23.8% were from 45 to 64; and 7.8% were 65 years of age or older. The gender makeup of the city was 46.5% male and 53.5% female.

=== 2000 census ===
As of the census of 2000, there were 434 people, 146 households, and 108 families residing in the city. The population density was 1,089.8 inhabitants per square mile (420.8/km^{2}). There were 171 housing units at an average density of 429.4 per square mile (165.8/km^{2}). The racial makeup of the city was 28.11% White, 70.74% Native American, and 1.15% from two or more races. Hispanic or Latino of any race were 0.92% of the population.

There were 146 households, out of which 39.0% had children under the age of 18 living with them, 39.7% were married couples living together, 26.0% had a female householder with no husband present, and 26.0% were non-families. 24.0% of all households were made up of individuals, and 6.2% had someone living alone who was 65 years of age or older. The average household size was 2.97 and the average family size was 3.48.

In the city, the population was spread out, with 37.1% under the age of 18, 9.4% from 18 to 24, 24.7% from 25 to 44, 20.0% from 45 to 64, and 8.8% who were 65 years of age or older. The median age was 28 years. For every 100 females, there were 80.8 males. For every 100 females age 18 and over, there were 79.6 males.

The median income for a household in the city was $22,250, and the median income for a family was $20,781. Males had a median income of $21,667 versus $14,875 for females. The per capita income for the city was $8,206. About 41.9% of families and 52.1% of the population were below the poverty line, including 77.4% of those under age 18 and 17.0% of those age 65 or over.

== See also ==
- List of cities in South Dakota
