= Garden City, South Dakota =

- Town
- Location in Clark County and the state of South Dakota
- Coordinates: 44°57′33″N 97°34′49″W
- Country: United States
- State: South Dakota
- County: Clark
- Settled: 1889

Area
  - Total: 0.39 sq mi (1.02 km^{2})
  - Land: 0.39 sq mi (1.02 km^{2})
  - Water: 0 sq mi (0.00 km^{2})
- Elevation: 1,847 ft (563 m)

Population (2020)
  - Total: 33
  - Density: 83.6/sq mi (32.29/km^{2})
- Time zone: UTC-6 (Central (CST))
  - Summer (DST): UTC-5 (CDT)
- ZIP code: 57236
- Area code: 605
- FIPS code: 46-23460
- GNIS feature ID: 1267399

Garden City is a town in Clark County, South Dakota, United States. The population was 33 at the 2020 census.

== History ==
Garden City was first settled in 1882, but it was in 1887 that Garden City was established as this was the year that the Chicago Milwaukee & St. Paul Railroad came through. The town was named from the site's garden-like setting.

== Geography ==
According to the United States Census Bureau, the town has a total area of 0.40 square miles (1.04 km^{2}), all land.

=== Climate ===
Climate data for Garden City, South Dakota
Month	Jan	Feb	Mar	Apr	May	Jun	Jul	Aug	Sep	Oct	Nov	Dec	Year
Record high °F (°C)	66 (19)	67 (19)	85 (29)	95 (35)	107 (42)	108 (42)	110 (43)	108 (42)	104 (40)	96 (36)	78 (26)	63 (17)	110 (43)
Mean daily maximum °F (°C)	22 (−6)	27 (−3)	39 (4)	55 (13)	67 (19)	76 (24)	83 (28)	81 (27)	71 (22)	57 (14)	39 (4)	25 (−4)	54 (12)
Daily mean °F (°C)	13 (−11)	18 (−8)	29 (−2)	44 (7)	56 (13)	66 (19)	72 (22)	70 (21)	60 (16)	46 (8)	30 (−1)	16 (−9)	43 (6)
Mean daily minimum °F (°C)	3 (−16)	8 (−13)	19 (−7)	32 (0)	45 (7)	55 (13)	61 (16)	58 (14)	48 (9)	35 (2)	21 (−6)	7 (−14)	33 (0)
Record low °F (°C)	−42 (−41)	−40 (−40)	−27 (−33)	−8 (−22)	16 (−9)	28 (−2)	38 (3)	32 (0)	15 (−9)	−8 (−22)	−22 (−30)	−35 (−37)	−42 (−41)
Average precipitation inches (mm)	0.53 (13)	0.60 (15)	1.24 (31)	1.97 (50)	2.94 (75)	3.92 (100)	3.50 (89)	2.82 (72)	2.78 (71)	2.06 (52)	0.92 (23)	0.54 (14)	23.82 (605)
Source: The Weather Channel (Historical Monthly Averages)

== Demographics ==
Historical population
Census	Pop.	Note	%±
1910	304		—
1920	204		−32.9%
1930	257		26.0%
1940	272		5.8%
1950	282		3.7%
1960	226		−19.9%
1970	126		−44.2%
1980	104		−17.5%
1990	93		−10.6%
2000	72		−22.6%
2010	53		−26.4%
2020	33		−37.7%
U.S. Decennial Census

=== 2010 census ===
As of the census of 2010, there were 53 people, 21 households, and 17 families residing in the town. The population density was 132.5 inhabitants per square mile (51.2/km^{2}). There were 35 housing units at an average density of 87.5 per square mile (33.8/km^{2}). The racial makeup of the town was 94.3% White and 5.7% from two or more races. Hispanic or Latino of any race were 5.7% of the population.

There were 21 households, of which 28.6% had children under the age of 18 living with them, 61.9% were married couples living together, 9.5% had a female householder with no husband present, 9.5% had a male householder with no wife present, and 19.0% were non-families. 19.0% of all households were made up of individuals, and 4.8% had someone living alone who was 65 years of age or older. The average household size was 2.52 and the average family size was 2.82.

The median age in the town was 48.2 years. 26.4% of residents were under the age of 18; 1.8% were between the ages of 18 and 24; 11.4% were from 25 to 44; 39.6% were from 45 to 64; and 20.8% were 65 years of age or older. The gender makeup of the town was 52.8% male and 47.2% female.

=== 2000 census ===
As of the census of 2000, there were 72 people, 31 households, and 19 families residing in the town. The population density was 182.1 inhabitants per square mile (70.3/km^{2}). There were 46 housing units at an average density of 116.3 per square mile (44.9/km^{2}). The racial makeup of the town was 100.00% White.

There were 31 households, out of which 25.8% had children under the age of 18 living with them, 54.8% were married couples living together, and 38.7% were non-families. 38.7% of all households were made up of individuals, and 25.8% had someone living alone who was 65 years of age or older. The average household size was 2.32 and the average family size was 3.16.

In the town, the population was spread out, with 26.4% under the age of 18, 2.8% from 18 to 24, 25.0% from 25 to 44, 19.4% from 45 to 64, and 26.4% who were 65 years of age or older. The median age was 42 years. For every 100 females, there were 111.8 males. For every 100 females age 18 and over, there were 112.0 males.

The median income for a household in the town was $31,875, and the median income for a family was $38,750. Males had a median income of $23,750 versus $21,250 for females. The per capita income for the town was $14,014. There were 9.5% of families and 12.5% of the population living below the poverty line, including no under eighteens and 33.3% of those over 64.
