= Clark, South Dakota =

- City
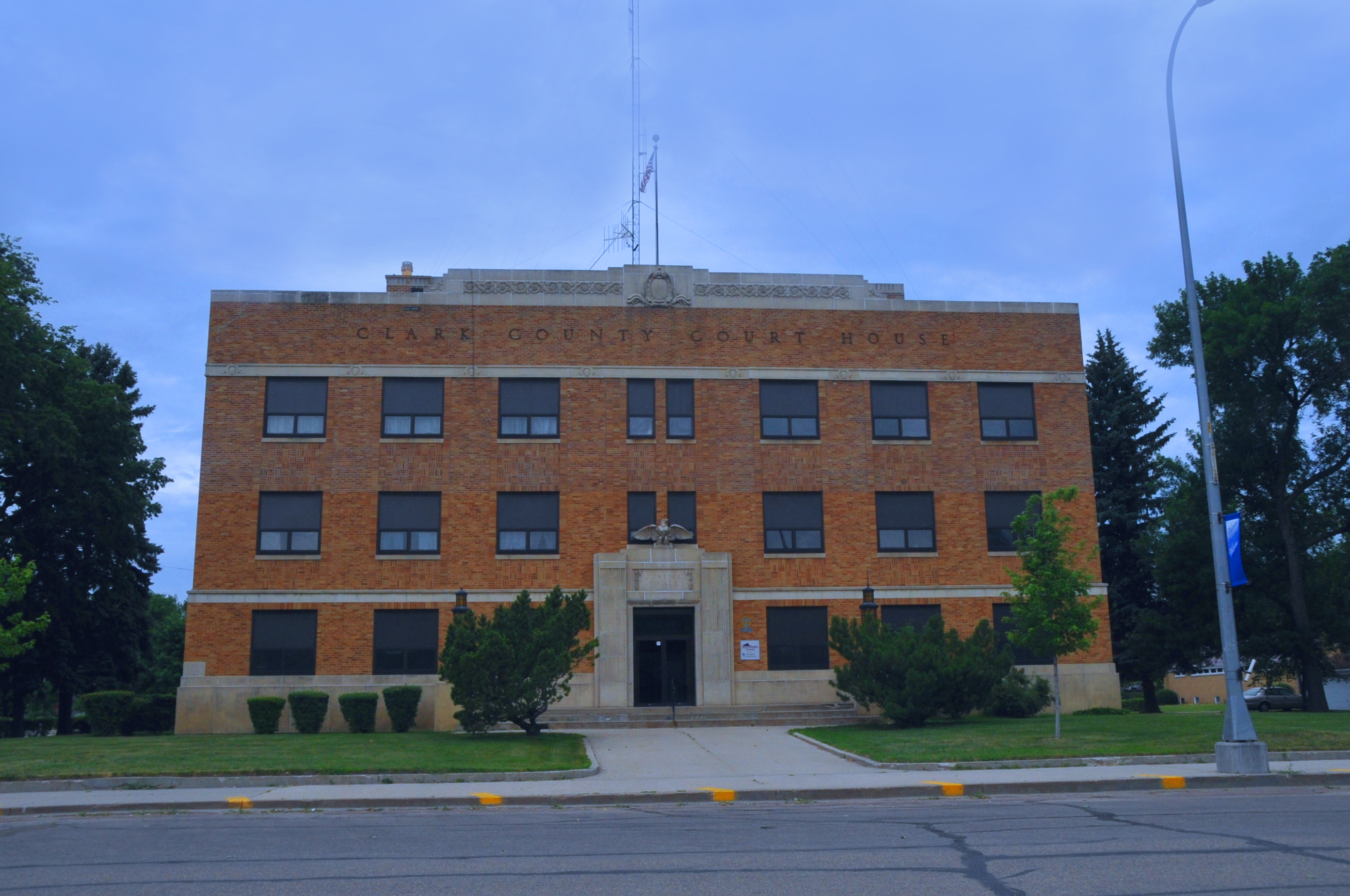
- Clark County Courthouse in Clark

- Seal

- Location within Clark County and South Dakota
- Coordinates: 44°52′36″N 97°44′05″W
- Country: United States
- State: South Dakota
- County: Clark
- Incorporated: 1886

Area
  - Total: 1.36 sq mi (3.51 km^{2})
  - Land: 1.36 sq mi (3.51 km^{2})
  - Water: 0 sq mi (0.00 km^{2})
- Elevation: 1,811 ft (552 m)

Population (2020)
  - Total: 1,148
  - Density: 848.2/sq mi (327.51/km^{2})
- Time zone: UTC−6 (Central (CST))
  - Summer (DST): UTC−5 (CDT)
- ZIP code: 57225
- Area code: 605
- FIPS code: 46-12180
- GNIS feature ID: 1267330
- Website: cityofclark.com

Clark is a city in and county seat of Clark County, South Dakota, United States. The population was 1,148 at the 2020 census.

== History ==
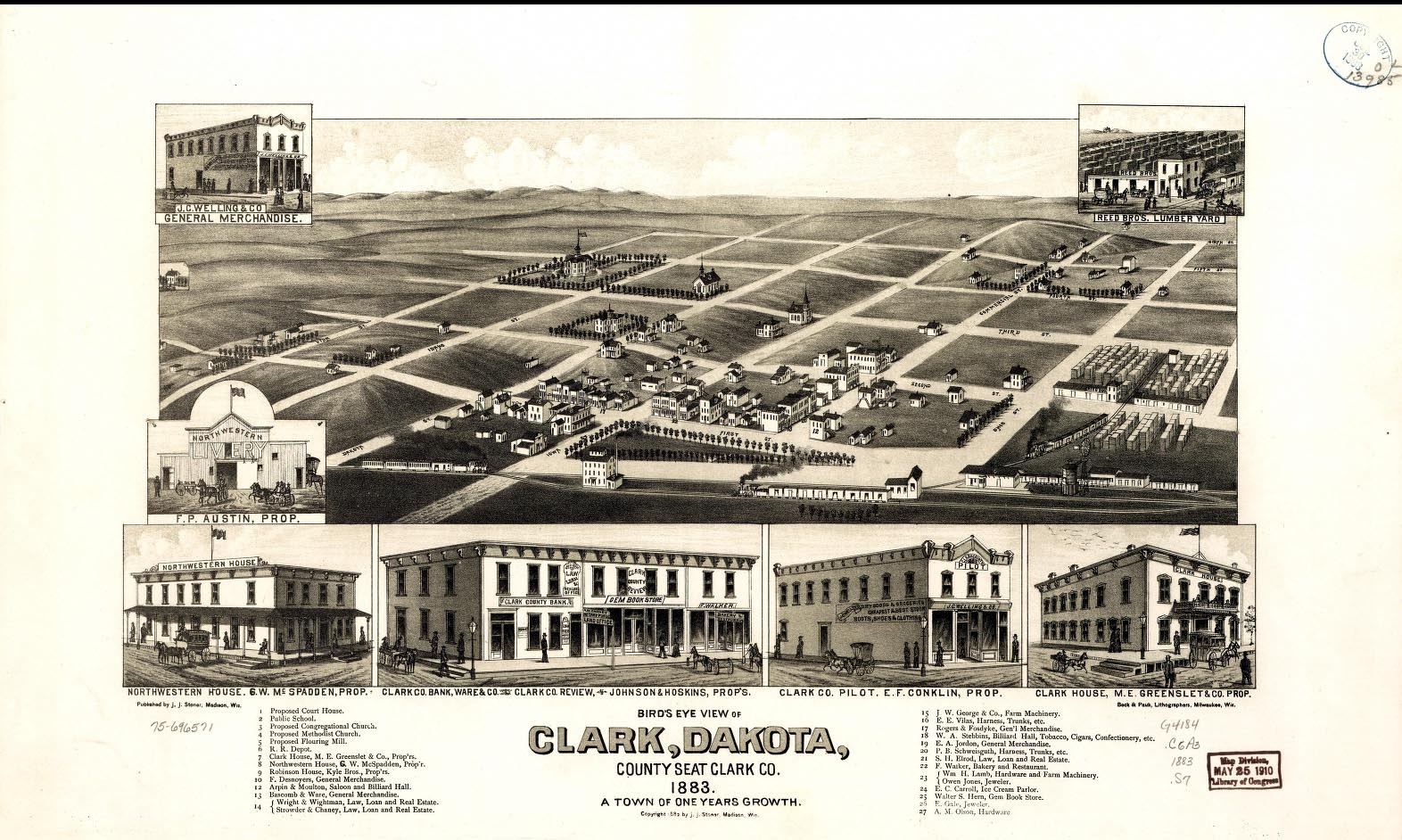
1883 illustration of Clark

A post office was established at Clark in 1880. Clark was platted in 1882. The city took its name from Clark County. An early variant name was Clark Center.

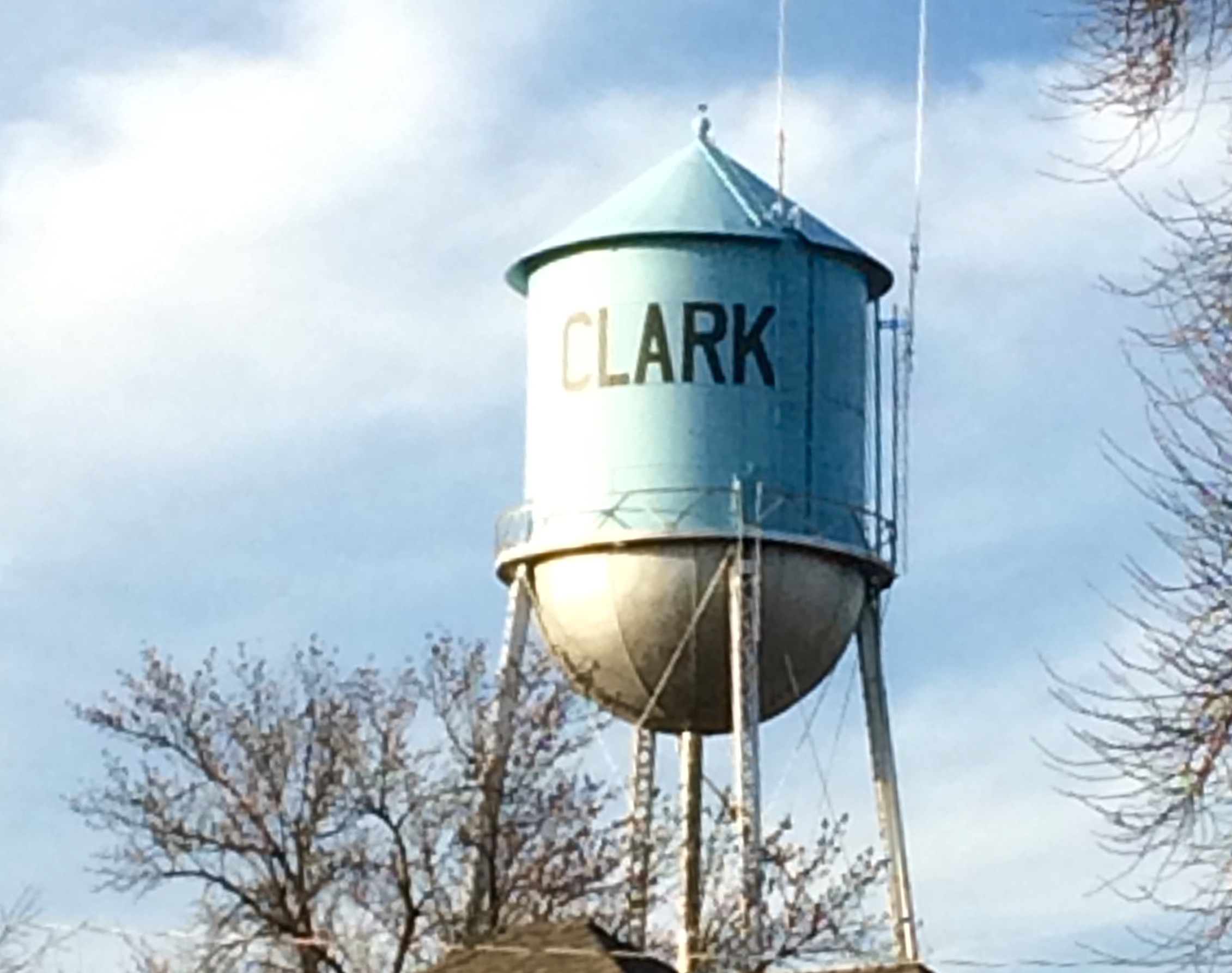
City of Clark Water Tower

In 1882, railroad tracks were first built through the middle of Clark. The Burlington Northern railroad and County Highway 212 ran parallel to one another and divided Clark into halves - the north half and the south half. Highway 212 similarly runs through the middle of Clark, and provides a direct travel route starting in Minneapolis, Minnesota, into Clark, then went to the Black Hills and to Yellowstone National Park.

Clark was officially founded in 1886, three years before South Dakota became a state. Not long after in June 1899, the local government took action, and the Clark City Council passed Ordinance No. 26. Serving as one of the first regulations enacted in Clark, Ordinance No. 26 made it unlawful for a person to ride a horse or bicycle, faster than eight miles an hour down Commercial Street. Eighteen years later, in 1917, residents from Elrod, a small town east of Clark, made a failed effort to move the county seat from Clark to Elrod. As of 2019, Clark still serves as the county seat and houses the modest Clark County Courthouse and a public library.

As for Clark's population, the highest number of residents was during the 1950s and early 1960s, which peaked at nearly 1,500 residents. In 1970, the numbers decreased to approximately 1,356 residents, and has decreased each decade thereafter until the 2020 census, which showed a minor increase. In 2016, the estimated population of Clark was 1,050 residents, or nearly a 30% population drop from the 1960s.

In the 1960s, when the town reached its peak population, residents from surrounding municipalities commonly traveled to Clark for work, entertainment, and to attend school with the Clark Public School System. Neighboring Townships, including Thorpe, Carpenter, and Garfield, bused their students to attend school at one of the three school buildings which offered a K through 12 education.

Many residents who called Clark home lived on family farms on the outskirts of town. Those living in town mostly resided in relatively modest homes, and often worked in the retail stores on Commercial Street.

Through the 1960s, the Clark community was able to support a variety of small businesses, including two hardware stores, two banks, two grain elevators, two clothing stores, a jewelry store, a movie theater, a bakery, a restaurant, and a dry cleaners.

As the years passed and the economy of Clark changed, various stores on Commercial Street came and went. The Burlington Northern Railroad stopped servicing Clark. However, the Clark water tower, the oft used grain elevators, and County Highway 212 remained in full use.

In the spring of 2018, only 12 students graduated from Clark High School, significantly less than the 66 students who graduated from Clark High School near its peak in 1968. However, recent numbers show that enrollment in the Clark Elementary School kindergarten class is at 28 students for the 2017–2018 school year.

== Geography ==
The town of Clark is located almost exactly in the geographical center of Clark County. The highest point in Clark County is located near the Township of Maydell, and the unnamed peak rises to 1,930 ft.

According to the United States Census Bureau, the city has a total area of 1.28 square miles (3.32 km^{2}), all land.

== Demographics ==
Historical population
Census	Pop.	Note	%±
1880	25		—
1890	592		2,268.0%
1900	684		15.5%
1910	1,220		78.4%
1920	1,392		14.1%
1930	1,290		−7.3%
1940	1,291		0.1%
1950	1,471		13.9%
1960	1,484		0.9%
1970	1,356		−8.6%
1980	1,351		−0.4%
1990	1,292		−4.4%
2000	1,285		−0.5%
2010	1,139		−11.4%
2020	1,148		0.8%
U.S. Decennial Census; 2018 Estimate

=== 2020 census ===
As of the 2020 census, Clark had a population of 1,148. The median age was 45.0 years. 21.3% of residents were under the age of 18 and 27.8% of residents were 65 years of age or older. For every 100 females there were 94.9 males, and for every 100 females age 18 and over there were 88.1 males age 18 and over.

0.0% of residents lived in urban areas, while 100.0% lived in rural areas.

There were 515 households in Clark, of which 21.9% had children under the age of 18 living in them. Of all households, 42.5% were married-couple households, 22.1% were households with a male householder and no spouse or partner present, and 29.7% were households with a female householder and no spouse or partner present. About 42.5% of all households were made up of individuals and 18.4% had someone living alone who was 65 years of age or older.

There were 589 housing units, of which 12.6% were vacant. The homeowner vacancy rate was 2.2% and the rental vacancy rate was 7.5%.

Racial composition as of the 2020 census
Race	Number	Percent
White	1,013	88.2%
Black or African American	5	0.4%
American Indian and Alaska Native	13	1.1%
Asian	4	0.3%
Native Hawaiian and Other Pacific Islander	2	0.2%
Some other race	53	4.6%
Two or more races	58	5.1%
Hispanic or Latino (of any race)	114	9.9%

=== 2010 census ===
As of the census of 2010, there were 1,139 people, 552 households, and 306 families living in the city. The population density was 889.8 inhabitants per square mile (343.6/km^{2}). There were 627 housing units at an average density of 489.8 per square mile (189.1/km^{2}). The racial makeup of the city was 98.5% White, 0.1% African American, 0.2% Asian, 0.3% from other races, and 1.0% from two or more races. Hispanic or Latino of any race were 1.4% of the population.

There were 552 households, of which 19.2% had children under the age of 18 living with them, 46.4% were married couples living together, 6.0% had a female householder with no husband present, 3.1% had a male householder with no wife present, and 44.6% were non-families. 40.6% of all households were made up of individuals, and 24.1% had someone living alone who was 65 years of age or older. The average household size was 1.99 and the average family size was 2.68.

The median age in the city was 51.5 years. 18.8% of residents were under the age of 18; 3.7% were between the ages of 18 and 24; 20.1% were from 25 to 44; 24.8% were from 45 to 64; and 32.7% were 65 years of age or older. The gender makeup of the city was 47.1% male and 52.9% female.

=== 2000 census ===
As of the census of 2000, there were 1,285 people, 558 households, and 334 families living in the city. The population density was 979.3 inhabitants per square mile (378.1/km^{2}). There were 632 housing units at an average density of 481.6 per square mile (185.9/km^{2}). The racial makeup of the city was 98.68% White, 0.23% African American, 0.39% Native American, 0.31% Asian, 0.08% from other races, and 0.31% from two or more races. Hispanic or Latino of any race were 0.31% of the population.

There were 558 households, out of which 24.0% had children under the age of 18 living with them, 50.7% were married couples living together, 6.6% had a female householder with no husband present, and 40.1% were non-families. 37.5% of all households were made up of individuals, and 24.2% had someone living alone who was 65 years of age or older. The average household size was 2.19 and the average family size was 2.90.

In the city, the population was spread out, with 22.8% under the age of 18, 4.4% from 18 to 24, 19.9% from 25 to 44, 23.1% from 45 to 64, and 29.7% who were 65 years of age or older. The median age was 47 years. For every 100 females, there were 84.1 males. For every 100 females age 18 and over, there were 80.4 males.

As of 2000 the median income for a household in the city was $29,432, and the median income for a family was $39,167. Males had a median income of $26,771 versus $17,868 for females. The per capita income for the city was $14,758. About 6.3% of families and 9.1% of the population were below the poverty line, including 7.0% of those under age 18 and 18.8% of those age 65 or over.

== Notable people ==
- Samuel H. Elrod (1856–1935), 5th Governor of South Dakota
- Doug Hegdahl (born 1946), United States Navy sailor and prisoner of war during Vietnam War
- Orator Henry LaCraft (1850–1940), South Dakota state senator
- Urban Odson (1918–1986), National Football League offensive tackle

== See also ==
- List of cities in South Dakota
