= List of state highways in South Dakota =

- Standard South Dakota state highway shields

System information
- Notes: South Dakota highways are generally state-maintained.

Highway names
- Interstates: Interstate X (I-X)
- US Highways: U.S. Highway X (US X)
- State: (State) Highway X (SD X)

System links
- South Dakota State Trunk Highway System; Interstate; US; State

South Dakota's state highways are assigned in a numbering pattern that followed that of the U.S. Highways followed upon their inception. East–west highways carried even numbers and increased from North to South – while north–south highways carried odd numbers and increased from east to west. This holds true only for two-digit highways. Three-digit highways follow the odd–even routing, but they do not sequentially remain near a "parent" route as a spur or alternate route and instead are independent of any parent two-digit route.

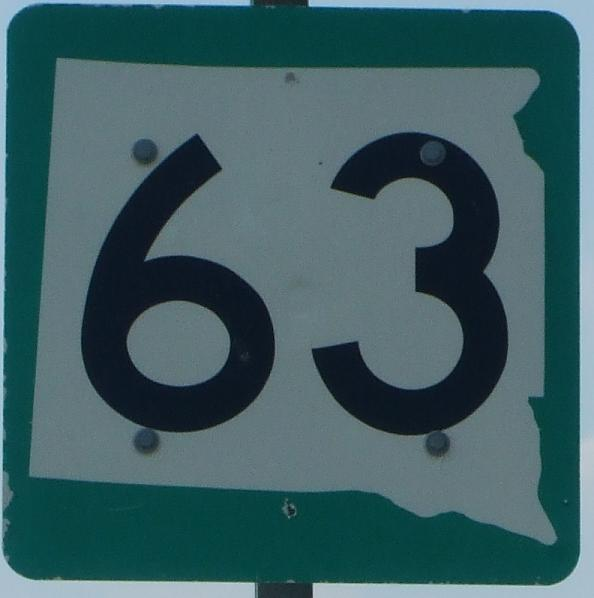
View of an actual South Dakota state highway sign. The signs enclose the route number within the state's shape on top of a green background.

== State highways ==
Number	Length (mi)	Length (km)	Southern or western terminus	Northern or eastern terminus	Formed	Removed	Notes
SD 8	180	290	Montana state line	Mobridge	1935	c. 1968	Absorbed by SD 20 when extended west across the Missouri River
SD 9	—	—	North Dakota state line	Britton	1935	1950	Now an unnumbered county road
SD 10	175.945	283.156	SD 1804 in Pollock	MN 28 at the Minnesota state line southeast of Sisseton	1927	current	
SD 11	77.724	125.085	South Franklin Street / East Rose Street in Elk Point	MN 269 at the Minnesota state line near Sherman	1926	current	Segment between SD 50 and SD 48 is currently not a portion of the highway
SD 12	325	523	Mound City	Minnesota state line southeast of Sisseton	1926	1927	Redesignated as SD 10
SD 13	23.891	38.449	SD 34 east of Egan	US 14 north of Elkton	1926	current	
SD 15	67.562	108.730	SD 28 west of Toronto	CR 17 / CR 34 north of Summit	1926	current	
SD 15A	10.486	16.876	US 12 near Marvin	SD 15 at Wilmot	1951	1976	Originally part of the SD 15 mainline; redesignated as SD 123
SD 15Y	12.167	19.581	US 12 in Big Stone City	SD 15 near Hartford Beach State Park	1957	1976	Redesignated as SD 109
SD 16	—	—	White Butte	Big Stone City	1926	1927	Designated as part of US 12
SD 17	1.006	1.619	SD 44 at Lennox	278th Street at Lennox	1926	current	
SD 18	200	320	Montana state line	Mobridge	1926	c. 1935	Redesignated as South Dakota Highway 8
SD 19	86.974	139.971	N-15 at the Nebraska state line south of Vermillion	SD 34 southeast of Madison	1926	current	Designated as part of US 12
SD 19A	8.161	13.134	SD 19/SD 46 south of Centerville	SD 19 west of Centerville	1950	current	Originally part of SD 19
SD 20	385.079	619.725	Montana state line near Camp Crook	MN 40 at the Minnesota state line near Revillo	1930	current	Follows US 212, US 81 and I-29 between two segments
SD 20A	9.150	14.725	SD 15 / SD 20 near La Bolt	CSAH 44 at the Minnesota state line	—	1975	Redesignated as SD 158
SD 20 Spur	3.532	5.684	Akaska	US 83 / SD 20 near Akaska	—	1976	Redesignated as SD 144
SD 20 Spur	0.458	0.737	North Lake Drive near Watertown	SD 20 near Watertown	—	—	Listed as SD 20P
SD 21	9.470	15.240	SD 28 west of Lake Norden	US 81 east of Hayti	1926	current	
SD 22	48.546	78.127	CR 181 in Hazel	MN 68 at the Minnesota state line south of Gary	1926	current	
SD 22 Spur	3.064	4.931	SD 22 near Gary	Main Avenue in Gary	—	1976	Redesignated as SD 101
SD 23	—	—	—	—	—	1976	Redesignated as SD 139
SD 24	148	238	Belle Fourche	Faith	1926	1960	Eliminated by a westward extension of SD 34
SD 24A	27	43	Belle Fourche	Black Hills	1940	1948	
SD 25	194.524	313.056	SD 50 northwest of Tabor	ND 18 at the North Dakota state line north of Claire City	1926	current	Gap in route designated as CR 9
SD 26	49.540	79.727	SD 47 north of Highmore	US 281 south of Redfield	1935	current	
SD 27	—	—	—	Hutchinson	1926	1935	Redesignated as part of SD 35
SD 27	42.639	68.621	US 12 southeast of Andover	ND 32 at the North Dakota state line northeast of Kidder	1975	current	Originally northern part of the path of SD 25
SD 28	105.937	170.489	US 281 west of Hitchcock	MN 271 at the Minnesota state line near Astoria	1934	current	
SD 30	—	—	Wyoming border southwest of Lead	Minnesota border near Elkton	1926	1927	
SD 30	17.077	27.483	CR 6/CR 77 west of White	MN 19 at the Minnesota state line northeast of Bushnell	1955	current	
SD 32	8.643	13.910	I-29 (via Exit 114)	SD 13 in Flandreau	—	—	
SD 34	419.010	674.331	WYO 24 at the Wyoming state line	MN 30 at the Minnesota state line	—	—	
SD 35	19	31	Near Tabor	Near Emery	1935	1976	
SD 36	9.087	14.624	US 16A in Custer State Park	SD 79 near Hermosa	—	—	
SD 37	242	389	N-14 at the Nebraska state line	ND 1 at the North Dakota state line	—	—	
SD 37A	2.4	3.9	SD 37 south of Tripp	US 18 north of Tripp	—	—	Business loop of highway 37 in Tripp
SD 38	63.393	102.021	I-90 Business in Mitchell	I-29 in Sioux Falls	—	—	
SD 38A	—	—	SD 38 near Sioux Falls	SD 38 in Sioux Falls	—	1994	
SD 40	37.369	60.140	US 16A in Keystone	BIA Highway 41 in Red Shirt	—	—	
SD 40A	2.173	3.497	SD 40 at Interior	Badlands National Park Interior entrance gate	—	—	Redesignated as SD 377
SD 41	197	317	Ravinia	North Dakota	1926	c. 1952	Absorbed by US 281
SD 42	71.973	115.829	US 281	IA 9 at the Iowa state line near Larchwood	—	—	Three segments
SD 43	1.131	1.820	N-11 at the Nebraska state line	US 18 in Fairfax	—	—	
SD 44	379.022	609.977	US 385 near Merritt	I-29 near Worthing	—	—	
SD 45	198	319	SD 44 / SD 50 in Platte	ND 3 at the North Dakota state line near Ashley	—	—	
SD 46	105.535	169.842	US 18 / US 281 in Pickstown	IA 10 at the Iowa state line near Hawarden	—	—	
SD 47	240.866	387.636	N-137 at the Nebraska state line	North Dakota state line	—	—	
SD 48	12.469	20.067	I-29 near Spink	Iowa state line near Akron	—	—	
SD 49	35.134	56.543	US 18 / US 183 in Colome	SD 47	—	—	
SD 50	212.421	341.858	SD 34 near Fort Thompson	IA 3 at the Iowa state line near Richland	—	—	
SD 52	28.567	45.974	SD 37 near Springfield	US 81 / SD 50 in Yankton	—	—	
SD 53	67.475	108.590	Nebraska state line near Clearfield	I-90 / US 83 in Vivian	—	—	Two segments
SD 54	16	26	Bonesteel	Nebraska	1926	c. 1960	
SD 59	51	82	Nebraska	Murdo	1927	c. 1935	Replaced by US 183
SD 63	167.455	269.493	US 18 near Parmelee	ND 6 at the North Dakota state line near McLaughlin	—	—	Two segments
SD 65	70.485	113.435	US 212 near Dupree	ND 31 near McIntosh	—	—	
SD 71	34.535	55.579	N-2 / N-71 at the Nebraska state line near Ardmore	US 18 Bypass in Hot Springs	1962	current	
SD 73	255.291	410.851	N-61 near Merriman	ND 49 at the North Dakota state line near Thunder Hawk	—	—	
SD 75	29.352	47.237	SD 20 near Bison	ND 8 at the North Dakota state line near Hettinger	—	—	
SD 79	213.7	343.9	US 18 / US 385 at Maverick Junction	ND 22 at the North Dakota state line	—	—	
SD 81	—	—	—	—	—	—	Redesignated as SD 87
SD 83	—	—	—	—	—	—	Redesignated as US 385
SD 85	—	—	—	—	—	—	Redesignated as SD 83
SD 87	37.894	60.984	US 385 near Pringle	US 16 / US 385 near Hill City	—	—	
SD 89	34.5	55.5	US 18 near Minnekahta	SD 87 in Custer State Park	—	—	
SD 100	—	—	I-29 south of Sioux Falls	I-90 east of Sioux Falls	2020	current	Under construction
SD 101	7.312	11.768	SD 10 / SD 45 near Eureka	Long Lake	—	1976	Redesignated as SD 239
SD 101	3.064	4.931	SD 22 near Gary	Main Avenue in Gary	1976	current	Formerly SD 22 Spur
SD 102	18.024	29.007	US 12 near Roscoe	SD 47 near Hosmer	—	1976	Redesignated as SD 253
SD 103	—	—	SD 46 near Beresford	Iowa state line at Hudson	—	1994	
SD 105	25.010	40.250	US 12 near Java	CR 55 at the North Dakota state line near Artas	—	1976	Formerly SD 271
SD 105	7.4	11.9	I-29 at North Sioux City	I-29 at Jefferson	c. 1980	1998	
SD 106	4.935	7.942	SD 25 near Claire City	SD 127 near Hammer	1975	current	
SD 109	12.167	19.581	US 12 in Big Stone City	SD 15 near Hartford Beach State Park	1975	current	Formerly SD 15Y
SD 115	40	64	US 18 near Canton	I-29 near Dell Rapids	1980	current	
SD 116	—	—	—	—	—	—	Became SD 423
SD 123	10.486	16.876	US 12 near Marvin	SD 15 at Wilmot	1975	current	Formerly SD 15A
SD 127	37.328	60.074	SD 10 in Sisseton	ND 127 at the North Dakota state line	1980	current	
SD 130	7.111	11.444	US 12 / US 83 / SD 20 in Selby	SD 271 in Java	1975	current	
SD 134	—	—	US 12 near Mina	Edmunds–Brown county line near Mina Lake	—	2009	
SD 136	—	—	SD 37 in Groton	US 12 at Groton	1975	2004	
SD 139	—	—	US 212 near Watertown	SD 50 near Watertown	1975	2010	Formerly SD 23
SD 144	3.532	5.684	Akaska	US 83 / SD 20 near Akaska	1975	current	Formerly SD 20 Spur
SD 147	—	—	—	—	—	—	Redesignated as SD 49
SD 153	2.369	3.813	SD 52 near Yankton	SD 50 near Yankton	—	—	
SD 158	9.150	14.725	SD 15 / SD 20 near La Bolt	CSAH 44 at the Minnesota state line	1975	current	Formerly SD 20A
SD 168	6.931	11.154	US 85 near Belle Fourche	SD 79 near Castle Rock	—	—	
SD 203	0.957	1.540	SD 258 near Plankinton	State Training School near Plankinton	—	—	
SD 204	2.131	3.430	SD 1806 at Lake Oahe	SD 1804 at Lake Oahe	—	—	Travels over Oahe Dam
SD 214	—	—	Bad River Road near Wendte	US 83 near Fort Pierre	—	1991	
SD 218	8.680	13.969	I-29 near Brookings	SD 13 near Elkton	—	—	Redesignated as SD 324
SD 224	7.962	12.814	Alpena	SD 37 near Huron	—	—	
SD 228	—	—	I-90 at Box Elder	Near Box Elder	1975	—	Former US 14/US 16
SD 230	—	—	I-90 BL at Rapid City	Box Elder	1975	2006	Former US 14/US 16
SD 231	7.040	11.330	I-90 near Black Hawk	SD 44 at Rapid City	—	—	
SD 232	—	—	SD 79 at Rapid City	SD 445 at Rapid City	1975	1994	
SD 235	—	—	—	—	—	—	Redesignated as US 16 Truck
SD 236	—	—	Lake Herman State Park	SD 34 near Madison	—	2006	
SD 238	—	—	SD 79 at Rapid City	SD 44 at Rapid City	1975	2006	
SD 239	7.312	11.768	SD 10 / SD 45 near Eureka	Long Lake	1975	current	Formerly SD 101
SD 240	40.033	64.427	I-90 / US 14 at Wall	I-90 near Cottonwood	—	—	Passes through Badlands National Park
SD 244	10.457	16.829	US 16 / US 385 near Hill City	US 16A near Keystone	1975	current	Provides access to Mount Rushmore
SD 245	—	—	SD 34 / SD 50 near Fort Thompson	SD 34 / SD 47 near Stephan	—	1985	
SD 247	23.023	37.052	US 12 at Roscoe	SD 10 / SD 45 near Eureka	1975	current	
SD 248	117.108	188.467	SD 240 near Badlands National Park	I-90 at Reliance	—	—	Former US 16
SD 249	1.055	1.698	SD 47 at Fort Thompson	SD 34 near Fort Thompson	1975	current	
SD 251	15.800	25.428	Nebraska state line near Gregory	US 18 / SD 47 at Gregory	—	—	
SD 253	18.024	29.007	US 12 near Roscoe	SD 47 near Hosmer	1975	current	Formerly SD 102
SD 258	2.552	4.107	I-90 at Plankinton	US 281 near Plankinton	—	—	
SD 262	17.563	28.265	I-90 near Alexandria	SD 42 at Bridgewater	—	—	Former US 16
SD 264	—	—	SD 11 at Brandon	Minnesota state line near Valley Springs	—	1999	Former US 16
SD 271	25.010	40.250	US 12 near Java	CR 55 at the North Dakota state line near Artas	1975	current	Formerly SD 105
SD 273	12.723	20.476	I-90 near Kennebec	SD 1806 near Lower Brule	1975	current	
SD 296	3	4.8	Turner—Lincoln near Centerville	SD 17 near Centerville	—	1991	
SD 298	—	—	Black Hills Ordnance Depot at Igloo	SD 471 near Igloo	1942	1998	
SD 314	3.751	6.037	SD 50 near Yankton	Yankton city limits	—	—	
SD 324	8.680	13.969	I-29 near Brookings	SD 13 near Elkton	—	—	Former SD 218
SD 365	1.5	2.4	US 18 / SD 73 at Martin	North of Martin	—	1995	Former US 18/SD 73
SD 377	2.173	3.497	SD 44 at Interior	Badlands National Park Interior entrance gate	—	—	
SD 391	3.362	5.411	N-27 at the Nebraska state line near Denby	US 18 near Denby	—	—	
SD 407	1.786	2.874	N-87 at the Nebraska state line near Pine Ridge	US 18 at Pine Ridge	—	—	
SD 423	0.5	0.80	New Underwood	I-90 near New Underwood	—	1998	
SD 435	—	—	SD 230 at Box Elder	I-90 at Box Elder	—	1998	
SD 437	—	—	SD 238 at Rapid City	I-90 at Rapid City	1975	1994	Now part of US 16 Truck
SD 439	—	—	SD 79 at Rapid City	I-90 BL at Rapid City	1975	1990	
SD 443	—	—	SD 44 at Rapid City	SD 79 at Rapid City	1975	2005	
SD 445	2.372	3.817	SD 231 at Rapid City	I-90 near Rapid City	1975	current	
SD 471	21.981	35.375	SD 71 near Rumford	US 18 at Edgemont	—	—	
SD 473	3.168	5.098	US 14A / US 85 near Lead	Stewart Slope Road near Trojan	—	—	
SD 514	—	—	—	—	—	—	Redesignated as parts of SD 1804 and SD 1806; became all of SD 204
SD 1804	126.745	203.976	Shore of the Missouri River south of Geddes	ND 1804 at the North Dakota state line northwest of Pollock	1975	current	Four segments
SD 1806	122.603	197.310	US 18 west of Bonesteel	ND 1806 at the North Dakota state line northwest of Kenel	1975	current	Four segments
Former
