= South Dakota Highway 15 =

State highway in South Dakota, United States

Highway 15

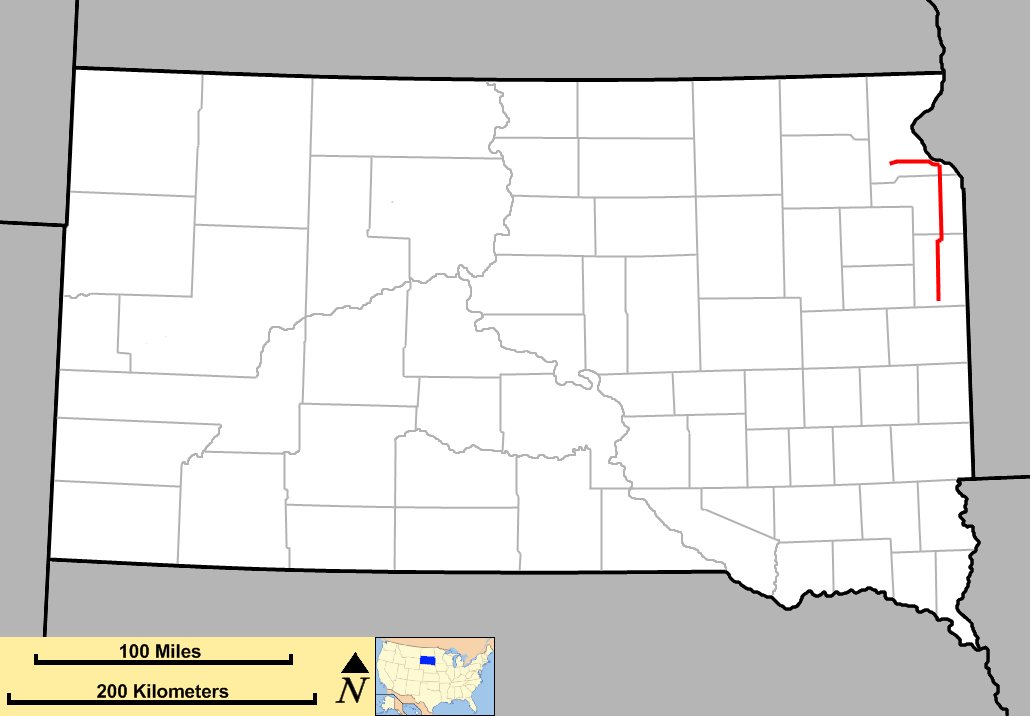
- Map of South Dakota with SD 15 in red

Route information
- Maintained by SDDOT
- Length: 67.562 mi (108.730 km)
- Existed: c. 1926–present

Major junctions
- South end: SD 28 west of Toronto
- SD 22 in Clear Lake; US 212 from north of Altamont to near Revillo; SD 20 near Revillo; SD 20 / SD 158 near La Bolt; US 12 in Milbank; I-29 / US 81 near Summit
- North end: CR 17 / CR 34 north of Summit

Location
- Country: United States
- State: South Dakota
- Counties: Deuel; Grant; Roberts

Highway system
- South Dakota State Trunk Highway System; Interstate; US; State
← US 14	→ US 16

South Dakota Highway 15 (SD 15) is a 67.562-mile-long (108.730 km) state highway in the northeastern South Dakota, United States. It connects Clear Lake, Milbank, and Wilmot.

SD 15 originally traveled from the Nebraska state line to the North Dakota state line. It followed what would eventually become U.S. Route 77 (US 77), which had been designated before 1931. Part of its path went north from Wilmot to Sisseton, then north to Hammer, along US 81's former path, west to Claire City, north to the North Dakota state line north of Claire City, where it met North Dakota Highway 18 (ND 18).

The segment from Sisseton to Hammer was redesignated as SD 127; the segment from Hammer to Claire City was redesignated as SD 106. From Claire City to North Dakota became SD 25. Part of the highway in the Wilmot area was redesignated as SD 15A.

== Route description ==
=== Deuel County ===
SD 15 begins at an intersection with SD 28 west of Toronto, in the south-central part of Deuel County. The roadway continues to the south as 476th Avenue. SD 15 travels to the north, through rural areas of the county. Just south of 183rd Street, the highway crosses over Hidewood Creek. It then enters the south-central part of Clear Lake. Almost immediately is an intersection with SD 22. Just north of Valley View Drive, it passes the Sanford Clear Lake Medical Center. Just south of 5th Street West, it passes Deuel Public School. Just north of 3rd Street West, it passes the Clear Lake Historical Society Museum. Just north of 2nd Street West, it passes the city's library, which is in the municipal building. Just before an intersection with the western terminus of 181st Street, it passes the city park. At the intersection with the western terminus of 181st Street leads to Ulven Park and the Deuel Athletic Complex. The highway then leaves Clear Lake. Just south of 180th Street, the highway passes the Clear Lake Municipal Airport. Almost immediately, it crosses over the southeastern part of Lake Sutton. Just north of this crossing, it passes the Lake Sutton and the Ketchum Lake state public shooting areas. Between 176th and 175th streets, it passes Altamont to the east. Just south of 174th Street, the highway passes the Altamont State Public Shooting Areas. It curves to the north-northwest and intersects US 212. The two highways travel concurrently to the northeast. They curve to the north, and then to the east-southeast. They cross over Caine Creek just west of 477th Avenue. Then, SD 15 splits off to the north. At an intersection with 166th Street, it enters the southeastern part of Grant County.

=== Grant County ===
At an intersection with 164th Street, SD 15 begins a concurrency with SD 20. Just south of 163rd Street, they cross over the South Fork Yellow Bank River. Just south of 161st Street, they cross over some railroad tracks of BNSF Railway. At an intersection with 157th Street, SD 20 splits off to the west, while SD 158 begins here and heads to the east. Just north of 153rd Street, SD 15 crosses over the North Fork Yellow Bank River. The highway then enters Milbank. In the main part of the city, it intersects US 12 (4th Avenue). Just north of this intersection is a crossing of some railroad tracks of BNSF Railway. It skirts along the eastern edge of Lake Farley Park. Just after leaving Milbank, SD 15 curves to the north-northeast and then back to the north. Between 144th and 143rd streets, it crosses over the North Fork Whetstone River. At an intersection with 142nd Street, it enters the southeastern part of Roberts County.

=== Roberts County ===
SD 15 continues to the north. North of 138th Street, which is southwest of Shady Beach and southeast of Linden Beach, it begins to curve to the west. On this curve, it intersects the northern terminus of SD 109. It travels just south of Linden Beach and then skirts along the southern edge of Hartford Beach State Park. It curves to the west-southwest and travels south of Hartford Beach. The highway curves to the northwest and then to the west. Between 469th and 468th avenues, it crosses over the North Fork Whetstone River. Just to the west of 486th Avenue, it travels just north of a sewage disposal pond just before entering Wilmot. Just east of 3rd Avenue, the highway crosses some railroad tracks of BNSF Railway. The very next intersection is with the northern terminus of SD 123 (5th Avenue) and the southern terminus of 467th Avenue. SD 123 leads to the business district of the city. Just to the west of 466th Avenue, SD 15 crosses over the North Fork Whetstone River again. It curves to the southwest and has an interchange with Interstate 29 (I-29). Approximately 3/4 mile (1.2 km) later, it meets its northern terminus, an intersection with County Road 34 (458th Avenue) and the eastern terminus of CR 17 (137th Street),

== History ==
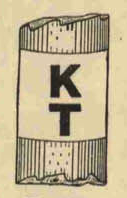
King of Trails marker

Originally, SD 15 traveled the entire north–south length of the state, from Nebraska to North Dakota, on the auto trail known as the King of Trails. It mostly followed the path of what would become US 77, which had been designated by 1931. The highway then went north from Milbank, west to Wilmont, and north to Sisseton. It then went north to Hammer along US 81. From there, it went west to Claire City, and then north to meet ND 18. By 1932, the only portion of this highway that remained was from US 12 to the North Dakota state line.

In the early 1950s, SD 15 was rerouted so its southern terminus was at US 12/US 77 in Milbank. It then went north to Hartford Beach, and then west through Wilmot to US 81, before heading north again; the old alignment from US 12 to Wilmot was redesignated as SD 15A. In 1976, the northern terminus was truncated to US 81; the segments of SD 15 near the North Dakota state line became SD 106 and part of a realigned SD 25. After US 77 was decommissioned in the state in the early 1980s, SD 15 then extended along its former alignment south from Milbank, to the present southern terminus.

== Major intersections ==
County	Location	mi	km	Destinations	Notes
Deuel		0.000	0.000	SD 28 / 476th Avenue south – I-29, Estelline, Toronto	Southern terminus; roadway continues as 476th Avenue.
Deuel	Clear Lake	12.042	19.380	SD 22 – I-29, Canby	
Deuel		22.147	35.642	US 212 west – Watertown	Southern end of US 212 concurrency
Deuel		22.185	35.703	US 212 east – Montevideo	Northern end of US 212 concurrency
Grant		27.152	43.697	SD 20 east – Revillo	Southern end of SD 20 concurrency
Grant		27.749	44.658	SD 20 west – Stockholm SD 158 east	Northern end of SD 20 concurrency; western terminus of SD 158
Grant	Milbank	34.912	56.185	US 12 (4th Avenue)	Leads to Avera Milbank Area Hospital
Roberts		52.866	85.080	SD 109 south – Big Stone City	Northern terminus of SD 109; former SD 15Y south
Roberts	Wilmot	59.712	96.097	SD 123 south (5th Avenue) – US 12	Northern terminus of SD 123; former SD 15A south
Roberts		66.486– 66.812	106.999– 107.523	I-29 / US 81 – Summit, Sisseton	I-29 exit 213
Roberts		67.562	108.730	CR 34 – US 12, Sisseton	Northern terminus
1.000 mi = 1.609 km; 1.000 km = 0.621 mi

== Related routes ==
=== Highway 15A ===
Highway 15A
- Location: Wilmot
- Existed: 1950s–1976

South Dakota Highway 15A (SD 15A) was a short state highway in the northeastern part of the U.S. state of South Dakota. This highway was originally part of the SD 15 mainline. In the early 1950s, the alignment of SD 15 was adjusted to add a segment between Milbank and Wilmot. The old alignment, between U.S. Route 12 (US 12) and Wilmot, was redesignated as SD 15A. In 1976, when many of the suffixed state routes were eliminated, this route was redesignated as SD 123.

=== Highway 15Y ===
Highway 15Y
- Location: Grant County–Roberts County
- Existed: 1960s–1976

South Dakota Highway 15Y (SD 15Y) was a short state highway in the northeastern part of the U.S. state of South Dakota. It was established in the early 1960s, from US 12 in Big Stone City to SD 15 southwest of Shady Beach. In 1976, it was redesignated as SD 109.

== See also ==
- List of state highways in South Dakota
