= U.S. Route 12 in South Dakota =

Section of U.S. Highway in South Dakota, United States

U.S. Highway 12
- US 12 highlighted in red

Route information
- Maintained by SDDOT
- Length: 319.24 mi (513.77 km)
- Existed: 1926–present

Major junctions
- West end: US 12 at the North Dakota state line near Lemmon
- US 83 in Selby; US 281 in Aberdeen; I-29 / US 81 near Summit
- East end: US 12 at the Minnesota state line in Big Stone City

Location
- Country: United States
- State: South Dakota
- Counties: Perkins, Corson, Walworth, Edmunds, Brown, Day, Roberts, Grant

Highway system
- United States Numbered Highway System; List; Special; Divided; South Dakota State Trunk Highway System; Interstate; US; State
| ← SD 11 | → SD 12 |

U.S. Highway 12 (US 12) is a part of the United States Numbered Highway System that travels from Aberdeen, Washington, to Detroit, Michigan. In the state of South Dakota, US 12 extends from the North Dakota border east to the Minnesota border.

== Route description ==
US 12 enters South Dakota from North Dakota as a rural two-lane highway about 10 miles (16 km) west-northwest of Lemmon before entering the Standing Rock Indian Reservation. For approximately the next 70 miles (110 km), US 12 runs parallel to the border of North Dakota, sometimes within less than a mile (1.6 km). At Walker, US 12 heads southeast for 37 miles (60 km), where it crosses the Missouri River at Mobridge, exiting the reservation. From there, it continues east for 18 miles (29 km), until it meets with US 83 near Selby. It overlaps US 83 for seven miles (11 km). After leaving US 83, it turns due east and spends about 80 miles (130 km) as a rural two-lane highway again. A few miles before reaching Aberdeen, it becomes an at-grade expressway. After the junction with US 281, it goes back to being two lanes for a few miles through Aberdeen and past Aberdeen Regional Airport, before once again becoming a four-lane expressway, until two miles (3.2 km) before Waubay. East of Waubay it becomes again an at-grade expressway until it meets with I-29 near Summit. The speed limit from Aberdeen to I-29 is 70 mph (110 km/h) except through the communities of Groton, Webster, and Waubay. From there, it heads southeast 22 miles (35 km) until Milbank. At Milbank, it continues east for 12 miles (19 km), until it crosses into Minnesota at Big Stone City, just south of Big Stone Lake.

The South Dakota section of US 12 is legally defined at South Dakota Codified Laws § 31-4-132.

== Major intersections ==
| County | Location | mi | km | Destinations | Notes |
|---|---|---|---|---|---|
| Perkins | White Butte Township | 80.50 | 129.55 | US 12 west – Hettinger | Continuation into North Dakota |
| Perkins | Lincoln Township | 91.08 | 146.58 | SD 73 south – Faith | Western end of SD 73 concurrency |
| Corson | Lemmon No. 2 | 101.68 | 163.64 | SD 73 north to ND 49 north – New Leipzig | Eastern end of SD 73 concurrency |
| Corson | Lake Township | 132.11 | 212.61 | SD 65 north to ND 31 north – Raleigh | Western end of SD 65 concurrency |
| Corson | Lake Township | 132.64 | 213.46 | SD 65 south – Isabel | Eastern end of SD 65 concurrency |
| Corson | McLaughlin | 159.32 | 256.40 | SD 63 – Fort Yates, Little Eagle | |
| Corson | Mission Township | 181.52 | 292.13 | SD 20 west / Lewis and Clark Trail / Native American Scenic Byway south – Timber Lake | Western end of SD 20 concurrency |
| Corson | Mission Township | 184.58 | 297.05 | SD 1806 south – Sitting Bull Monument | Western end of SD 1806 concurrency |
| Corson | Mission Township | 185.69 | 298.84 | SD 1806 north / Lewis and Clark Trail / Native American Scenic Byway north – Wakpala, Indian Memorial Recreation Area | Eastern end of SD 1806 concurrency |
| Missouri River (Lake Oahe) | | 186.18 | 299.63 | US 12 Missouri River Bridge | |
| Walworth | Mobridge Township | 189.92 | 305.65 | SD 1804 north (4th Avenue East) / Lewis and Clark Trail – Pollock | Western end of SD 1804 concurrency |
| Walworth | West Walworth | 193.79 | 311.87 | SD 1804 south – Akaska | Eastern end of SD 1804 concurrency |
| Walworth | West Walworth–East Walworth line | 207.38 | 333.75 | US 83 north – Mound City | Western end of US 83 concurrency |
| Walworth | Selby | 209.96 | 337.90 | SD 130 east (Scranton Street) – Java, Lake Hiddenwood Recreation Area | Western terminus of SD 130 |
| Walworth | West Walworth–East Walworth line | 214.08 | 344.53 | US 83 south / SD 20 east / Lewis and Clark Trail to US 212 | Eastern end of US 83/SD 20 concurrency |
| Walworth | East Walworth | 220.94 | 355.57 | SD 271 north – Java, Lake Hiddenwood Recreation Area | |
| Walworth | East Walworth | 226.06 | 363.81 | SD 47 south – Hoven | Western end of SD 47 concurrency |
| Edmunds | Bowdle | 233.07 | 375.09 | SD 47 north – Eureka | Eastern end of SD 47 concurrency |
| Edmunds | Cottonwood Lake–Glen township line | 242.07 | 389.57 | SD 253 north – Hosmer | Southern terminus of SD 253 |
| Edmunds | Roscoe | 248.04 | 399.18 | SD 247 north (Mitchell Street) | Southern terminus of SD 247 |
| Edmunds | Ipswich | 263.10 | 423.42 | SD 45 south (4th Street) | Western end of SD 45 concurrency |
| Edmunds | Fountain Township | 268.13 | 431.51 | SD 45 north – Leola | Eastern end of SD 45 concurrency |
| Brown | Aberdeen | 288.94 | 465.00 | US 281 (19th Street) to SD 10 – Redfield | |
| Brown | Groton | 309.02 | 497.32 | SD 37 (Broadway Street) to SD 10 – Doland | |
| Day | Bristol Township | 326.37 | 525.24 | SD 27 – Britton | Southern terminus of SD 27 |
| Day | Webster | 343.04 | 552.07 | SD 25 (Main Street) to US 212 / SD 10 – Fort Sisseton State Park | |
| Roberts | Summit Township | 366.36 | 589.60 | I-29 / US 81 – Watertown, Sisseton | |
| Grant | Osceola–Kilborn township line | 376.68 | 606.21 | SD 123 – Wilmot | Southern terminus of SD 123 |
| Grant | Milbank | 389.06 | 626.13 | SD 15 (Dakota Street) to US 212 – Hartford Beach State Park | Southern terminus of SD 123 |
| Grant | Big Stone City | 399.02 | 642.16 | SD 109 – Hartford Beach State Park | Southern terminus of SD 109 |
| Grant | Big Stone City | 399.74 | 643.32 | US 12 east – Ortonville | Continuation into Minnesota |
1.000 mi = 1.609 km; 1.000 km = 0.621 mi: Concurrency terminus

== See also ==
U.S. Route 12
| Previous state: North Dakota | South Dakota | Next state: Minnesota |
