= South Dakota Highway 109 =

State highway in South Dakota, United States

Highway 109

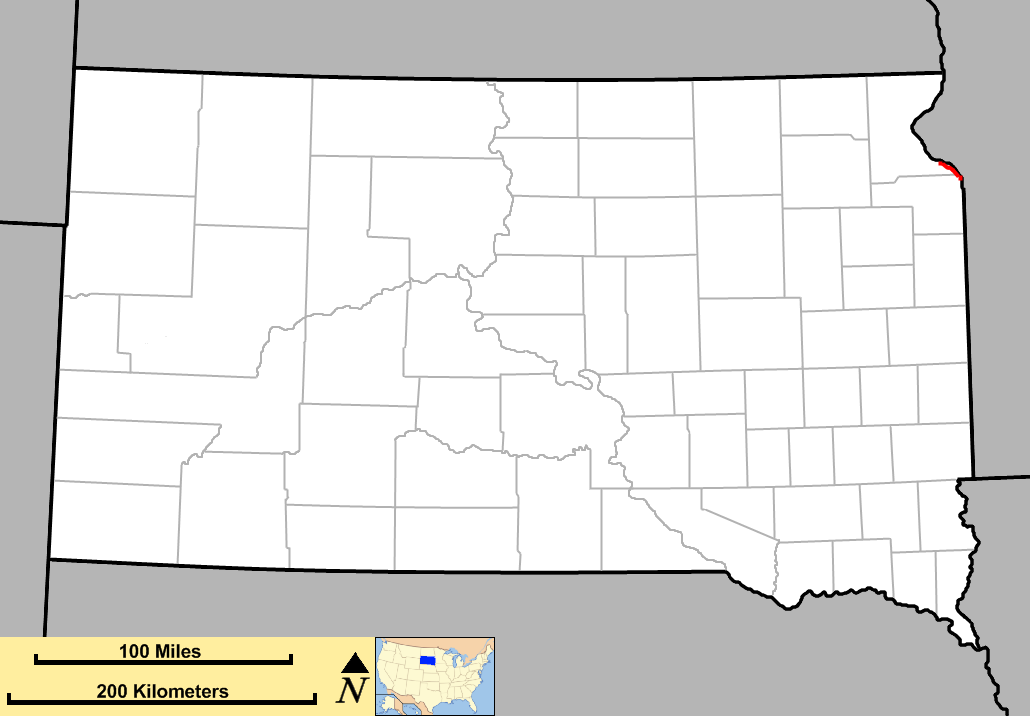
- Route of SD 109 (in red)

Route information
- Maintained by SDDOT
- Length: 12.167 mi (19.581 km)
- Existed: 1975–present
- History: SD 15Y: 1962–1975

Major junctions
- South end: US 12 in Big Stone City
- North end: SD 15 in Geneseo Township

Location
- Country: United States
- State: South Dakota
- Counties: Grant, Roberts

Highway system
- South Dakota State Trunk Highway System; Interstate; US; State
| ← SD 106 | → SD 115 |

South Dakota Highway 109 (SD 109) is a 12.167-mile (19.581 km) state highway in Grant and Roberts counties in South Dakota, United States, runs along the south side of Big Stone Lake and the Minnesota border from U.S. Route 12 in Big Stone City to South Dakota Highway 15.

== Route description ==
SD 109 begins at an intersection with US 12 in Big Stone City. It immediately crosses a bridge spanning railroad tracks and it heads northwest out of town. The highway follows the curvature of Big Stone Lake on the Minnesota River to the northwest and west for 12 miles (19 km). It ends at a 90-degree bend in SD 15 east of Hartford Beach State Park.

== History ==
SD 109 was originally designated Highway 15Y. It was renumbered to 109 in 1975.

== Major intersections ==
| County | Location | mi | km | Destinations | Notes |
|---|---|---|---|---|---|
| Grant | Big Stone City | 0.000 | 0.000 | US 12 – Milbank, Big Stone City | |
| Roberts | Geneseo Township | 12.167 | 19.581 | SD 15 – Milbank, Hartford Beach, Wilmot | |
1.000 mi = 1.609 km; 1.000 km = 0.621 mi
