= South Dakota Highway 158 =

State highway in Vernon Township, Grant County, South Dakota, United States

Highway 158

Route information
- Maintained by SDDOT
- Length: 9.150 mi (14.725 km)

Major junctions
- West end: SD 15 / SD 20 near La Bolt
- East end: CSAH 44 at the Minnesota state line near Nassau, MN

Location
- Country: United States
- State: South Dakota
- Counties: Grant

Highway system
- South Dakota State Trunk Highway System; Interstate; US; State
← SD 153	→ SD 168

South Dakota Highway 158 (SD 158) is a 9.150-mile-long (14.725 km) state highway in Vernon Township, Grant County, South Dakota, United States. It travels from an intersection with SD 15 and SD 20 to the Minnesota state line, where it continues as County State-Aid Highway 44 (CSAH 44) in Lac qui Parle County.

== Route description ==
SD 158 begins at an intersection with SD 15 and SD 20 north of La Bolt and treks east through flat farmland. The highway continues east for approximately nine miles (14 km) before curving to the northeast and ending at the Minnesota state line, continuing for 1.94 miles (3.12 km) as CSAH 44, before terminating at CSAH 7. The route has a speed limit of 65 miles per hour (105 km/h) for its entire duration.

SD 158 is maintained by SDDOT. In 2012, the traffic on the highway was measured in average annual daily traffic, and SD 158 had an average of 235 vehicles. The designation is not a part of the National Highway System, a system of highways important to the nation's defense, economy, and mobility.

== Major intersections ==
The entire route is in Vernon Township, Grant County.

mi	km	Destinations	Notes
0.000	0.000	SD 15 / SD 20 – US 212, Stockholm, Milbank	Western terminus; roadway continues west as SD 20
9.150	14.725	CSAH 44 east	Eastern terminus; roadway continues into Minnesota as CSAH 44
1.000 mi = 1.609 km; 1.000 km = 0.621 mi
