= South Dakota Highway 106 =

State highway in South Dakota, United States

Highway 106

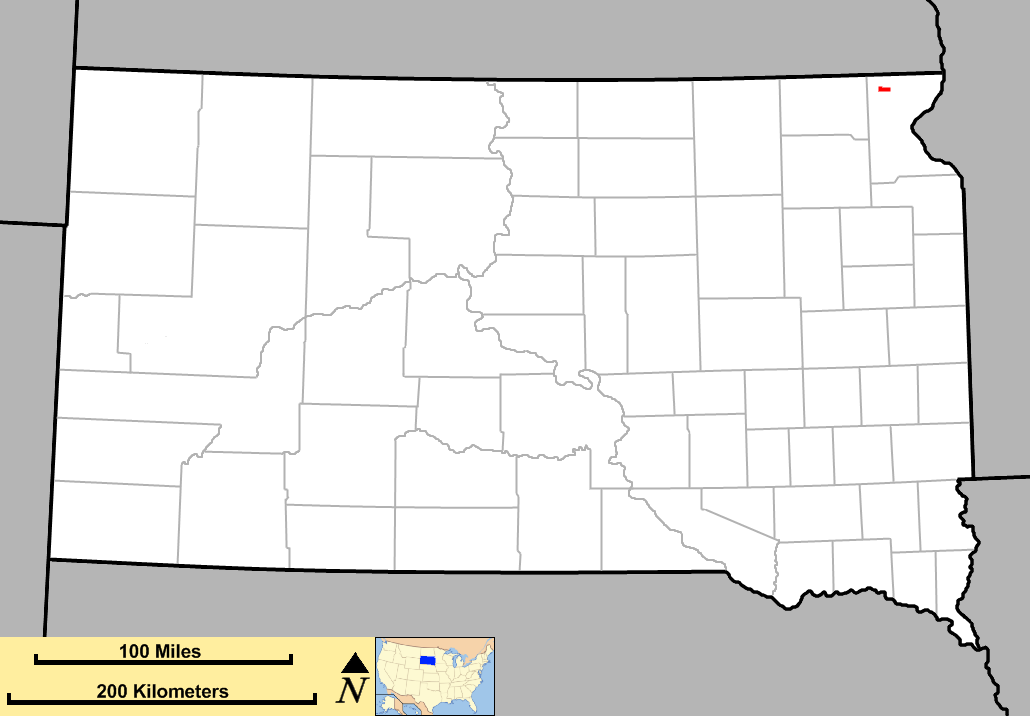
- Route of SD 106 (in red)

Route information
- Maintained by SDDOT
- Length: 4.935 mi (7.942 km)
- Existed: 1975–present

Major junctions
- West end: SD 25 north of Claire City
- East end: SD 127 south of Hammer

Location
- Country: United States
- State: South Dakota
- Counties: Roberts

Highway system
- South Dakota State Trunk Highway System; Interstate; US; State
← SD 101	→ SD 109

South Dakota Highway 106 (SD 106) is a 4.935-mile-long (7.942 km) state highway in the northeastern part of the U.S. state of South Dakota. It links Claire City with Hammer. It was commissioned in 1976, following the former route of SD 15.

== Route description ==
SD 106 begins as 455th Avenue at a junction with SD 25 and continues south into Claire City. It continues south out of the town as Main Street after crossing the railroad tracks before turning east as 106th Street. SD 106 continues east to its terminus at SD 127.

== Major intersections ==
The entire route is in Roberts County.

Location	mi	km	Destinations	Notes
	0.000	0.000	SD 25 / 105th Street – Veblen, Lidgerwood	Western terminus
	4.935	7.942	SD 127 – Sisseton, Rosholt, Hammer	Eastern terminus of SD 106; southern terminus of CR 14
1.000 mi = 1.609 km; 1.000 km = 0.621 mi
