= South Dakota Highway 123 =

State highway in South Dakota, United States

Highway 123
- 467th Avenue

Route information
- Maintained by SDDOT
- Length: 10.486 mi (16.876 km)
- Existed: 1975–present

Major junctions
- South end: US 12 east of Marvin
- North end: SD 15 / CR 9 in Wilmot

Location
- Country: United States
- State: South Dakota
- Counties: Grant, Roberts

Highway system
- South Dakota State Trunk Highway System; Interstate; US; State
← SD 116	→ SD 127

South Dakota Highway 123 (SD 123), 467th Avenue, is a 10.486-mile (16.876 km) north–south state highway in Grant and Roberts counties in South Dakota, United States, that connects U.S. Route 12 (US 12) with South Dakota Highway 15 (SD 15).

== Route description ==
=== Grant County ===
SD 123 runs along a two-lane section of 467th Avenue, beginning at an intersection with US 12 in Grant County, about 2.5 miles (4.0 km) east of Marvin. 467th Avenue continues south as a dirt road to connect with County Road 14 and end at County Road 26. US 12 heads westerly to pass by the north side of both Marvin and Summit, before an interchange with Interstate 29/U.S. Route 81 [I‑29/US 81] at Exit 207, then on to its national western terminus in Aberdeen, Washington. US 12 heads easterly to pass north of Twin Brooks, through Milbank, and on to its national western terminus in Detroit, Michigan.

From its southern terminus SD 123 heads north through open plains to cross 146th Street and 145th Street. (Grant County Road 4 runs east along 145th Street from SD 123.) The route then crosses 144th Street just before crossing over an unnamed street and then crosses 143rd Street (Grant County Road 2). The next road crossing is 142nd Street, which runs along the border between Grant and Roberts counties. Within Grant County, SD 123 runs along the border between Osceola and Kilborn civil townships.

=== Roberts County ===
Upon crossing 142nd Street, about 4.6 miles (7.4 km) north of its southern terminus, SD 123 enters Roberts County and almost immediately crosses over another unnamed stream. Continuing north through rolling farmland the route crosses 141st Street (Roberts County Road 11) and then 140th Street (Roberts County Road 18). After crossing 139th Street, SD 15 crosses over one more unnamed stream before crossing 138th Street. Shortly after crossing 137th Street, the route enters the only populated place along the route, the city of Wilmot.

Within Wilmot, SD 123 crosses Ordway, 1st, and 2nd streets before connecting with the west ends of Main, 3rd, and 4th streets before reaching its northern terminus at a junction with SD 15 and Roberts County Road 9 (CR 9) on the northern edge of the city. (Within Roberts County, except for the section within the city of Wilmot, SD 123 runs along the border between Springdale and Garfield civil townships.) CR 9 continues north along 467th Avenue, on the border between Lee and Lake civil townships, to connect with Roberts County Road 24 before reaching the Minnesota state line, on the edge of the city of Browns Valley, Minnesota. SD 15 heads west, along the border between Springdale and Lee townships to enter the Lake Traverse Indian Reservation and end at a junction with Robert County Road 17 and Roberts County Road 34, just west of SD 15's interchange with I‑29/US 81 at Exit 213. SR 15 heads east to along the border between Garfield and Lake townships to Big Stone Lake, before turning south, passing through the city of Milbank, and eventually ending at an interchange with I‑29/US 81 at Exit 150.

=== Traffic ===
In 2011, the South Dakota Department of Transportation (SDDOT) measured the amount of traffic on its highways in average annual daily traffic. SD 123 had an average of 217 vehicles, including 31 trucks. SDDOT's 2018 report does not provide data for SD 123, however, the January 2019 Aberdeen Region Highway Log reports average daily traffic of 197 vehicles for the segment south of Wilmot and 375 vehicles within Wilmot.

== Major intersections ==
County	Location	mi	km	Destinations	Notes
Grant	Osceola–Kilborn township line	0.000	0.000	US 12 – Milbank, Webster	Southern terminus
Roberts	Wilmot	10.486	16.876	SD 15 – I-29, Milbank	Northern terminus
1.000 mi = 1.609 km; 1.000 km = 0.621 mi
