= Edgar Kelley =

American politician

Edgar S. Kelley (November 23, 1851 – June 29, 1929) was a member of the South Dakota House of Representatives.

== Biography ==
Kelley was born on November 23, 1851, in Walworth County, Wisconsin. When he was a year old, he moved with his parents to Green County, Wisconsin. He moved to Grant County, Dakota Territory, in 1879 and lived in Millbank.

== Career ==
Kelley was a member of the House of Representatives from 1903 to 1906. He was a Republican.
