= Twinbrook =

Twinbrook or Twin Brooks may refer to:

- Twinbrook, Belfast, a district on the outskirts of West Belfast
- Twinbrook (WMATA station), a Washington Metro station in Montgomery County, Maryland
- Twinbrook (Rockville, Maryland), a subdivision of Rockville, Maryland
- Twinbrook, a fictional town in The Sims 3: Ambitions
- Twin Brooks, Edmonton, a neighborhood of Edmonton
- Twin Brooks, South Dakota, a town in South Dakota
