= South Dakota Highway 168 =

State highway in South Dakota, United States

Highway 168

Route information
- Maintained by SDDOT
- Length: 6.931 mi (11.154 km)

Major junctions
- West end: US 85 north of Belle Fource
- East end: SD 79 north of Castle Rock

Location
- Country: United States
- State: South Dakota
- Counties: Butte

Highway system
- South Dakota State Trunk Highway System; Interstate; US; State
← SD 158	→ US 183

South Dakota Highway 168 (SD 168) is a state highway in Butte County in the U.S. state of South Dakota. It runs from U.S. Highway 85 (US 85) to SD 79. The highway is maintained by the South Dakota Department of Transportation (SDDOT), and is not part of the National Highway System.

== Route description ==
SD 168 begins at an intersection with US 85 in Butte County and treks southeast through rolling plains. The route continues in this direction for approximately seven miles (11 km) before meeting its eastern terminus at an intersection with SD 79 north of Castle Rock.

SD 168 is maintained by SDDOT. In 2012, the traffic on the highway was measured in average annual daily traffic. The route had an average of 165 vehicles. The designation is not a part of the National Highway System, a system of highways important to the nation's defense, economy, and mobility.

== Major intersections ==
The entire route is in Butte County.

Location	mi	km	Destinations	Notes
	0.000	0.000	US 85 – Belle Fourche, Buffalo	Western terminus
	6.931	11.154	SD 79 – US 212, Newell, Reva	Eastern terminus
1.000 mi = 1.609 km; 1.000 km = 0.621 mi
