= Peever Flats, South Dakota =

- Census-designated place
- Location within South Dakota Location within the United States
- Coordinates: 45°31′23″N 96°56′11″W
- Country: United States
- State: South Dakota
- County: Roberts

Area
  - Total: 0.073 sq mi (0.19 km^{2})
  - Land: 0.073 sq mi (0.19 km^{2})
  - Water: 0 sq mi (0.00 km^{2})
- Elevation: 1,227 ft (374 m)

Population (2020)
  - Total: 129
  - Density: 1,726.0/sq mi (666.42/km^{2})
- Time zone: UTC-6 (Central (CST))
  - Summer (DST): UTC-5 (CDT)
- ZIP Code: 57257 (Peever)
- Area code: 605
- FIPS code: 46-48948
- GNIS feature ID: 2813057

Peever Flats is an unincorporated community and census-designated place (CDP) in Roberts County, South Dakota, United States, within the Lake Traverse Indian Reservation. It was first listed as a CDP prior to the 2020 census. The population of the CDP was 129 at the 2020 census.

It is in the east-central part of the county, 2 miles (3 km) southeast of the town of Peever.

== Demographics ==
Historical population
Census	Pop.	Note	%±
2020	129		—
U.S. Decennial Census
