= Merle Bartnick =

American politician and farmer (1931–1990)

Member of the South Dakota House of Representatives from the 1st district
- In office January 10, 1989 – July 31, 1990 Serving with Neil Gleason
- Preceded by: Kent Frerichs
- Succeeded by: David Gleason; Mona Greseth

Personal details
- Born: November 11, 1931 Claire City, South Dakota, U.S.
- Died: July 31, 1990 (aged 58) Fargo, North Dakota, U.S.
- Party: Democratic
- Spouse: Grace Trittin (m. 1953)
- Children: 2

Merle D. Bartnick (November 11, 1931 – July 31, 1990) was an American politician and farmer. Born in Claire City, he moved to New Effington after high school, where he became a farmer. In 1988, he was elected as a member of the South Dakota House of Representatives, representing the 1st district as a Democrat. Early into his tenure, Bartnick was diagnosed with cancer; he later advocated for a standardized system for collecting cancer reports across South Dakota. Bartnick did not run for re-election in 1990 and died died in office on July 31, 1990, at a hospital in Fargo, North Dakota.

== Life and career ==
Merle D. Bartnick was born on November 11, 1931, in Claire City, South Dakota. He graduated from Sisseton High School in 1948. He later began farming near New Effington. Bartnick married Grace Trittin on October 24, 1953; together, they had two sons: David and Jeffrey. Bartnick served variously as township clerk, school board member, and town finance officer. Bartnick was nominated for the Outstanding School Board Member Award for 1972 at the Associated School Boards of South Dakota Convention; he was also presented with a certificate of meritorious service by state senator Harvey Wollman. In 1983, Bartnick was a member of the board of trustees of New Effington.

In 1988, Bartnick was a candidate for the South Dakota House of Representatives, seeking to represent the 1st district as a Democrat. The incumbent, Kent Frerichs, did not seek re-election. In the general election, Bartnick won alongside incumbent and fellow Democrat Neil Gleason. Bartnick defeated the lone Republican in the race, Roger A. Williams, by over four points and a margin of nearly 600 votes. Bartnick was sworn in alongside the rest of the South Dakota Legislature on January 10, 1989.

As a member of the House, Bartnick was against abortion except when the mother's life was in danger. The South Dakota Farmers' Union gave Bartnick a perfect rating for his voting record during the 1989 session. In March 1989, Bartnick was diagnosed with cancer. In February 1990, Bartnick voted against a proposal for a constitutional amendment that would limit the annual increase in local property taxes to 2%. That same month, Bartnick was absent for 10 days as he was undergoing treatment for cancer. Soon after returning, he voted in favor of a bill adding Lotto America to the South Dakota Lottery because of an agreement to let a bill that would move regulation of grain elevators to the state Department of Commerce die. He also advocated for a bill that would compile and analyze cancer reports from hospitals across South Dakota. The House and Senate passed different versions of the bill and attempted to compromise, but failed to do so before the end of the legislative session. Bartnick did not run for re-election in 1990 and was succeeded by David Gleason and Mona Greseth. On July 31, 1990, Bartnick died of cancer at a hospital in Fargo, North Dakota.

== Electoral history ==
1988 South Dakota House of Representatives district 1 election
Party	Candidate	Votes	%
Democratic	Neil Gleason (incumbent)	5,431	38.64%
Democratic	Merle Bartnick	4,606	32.77%
Republican	Roger A. Williams	4,017	28.58%
Total votes		14,054	100.00%
