= Troy, South Dakota =

Unincorporated community in South Dakota, U.S.

Coordinates: 45°02′15″N 96°51′55″W

Troy
- Unincorporated community
- Location in South Dakota, United States
- Country: United States
- State: South Dakota
- County: Grant

Population
  - Total: 71
- Time zone: UTC-6 (Central)
  - Summer (DST): UTC-5 (CDT)

Troy is an unincorporated community in Grant County, in the U.S. state of South Dakota. Troy also has a population of 71 citizens.

== History ==
A post office called Troy was established in 1880, and remained in operation until 1955. The town site was laid out in 1886 by the Milwaukee Railroad.
