= Roberts County, South Dakota =

County in South Dakota, United States

- County
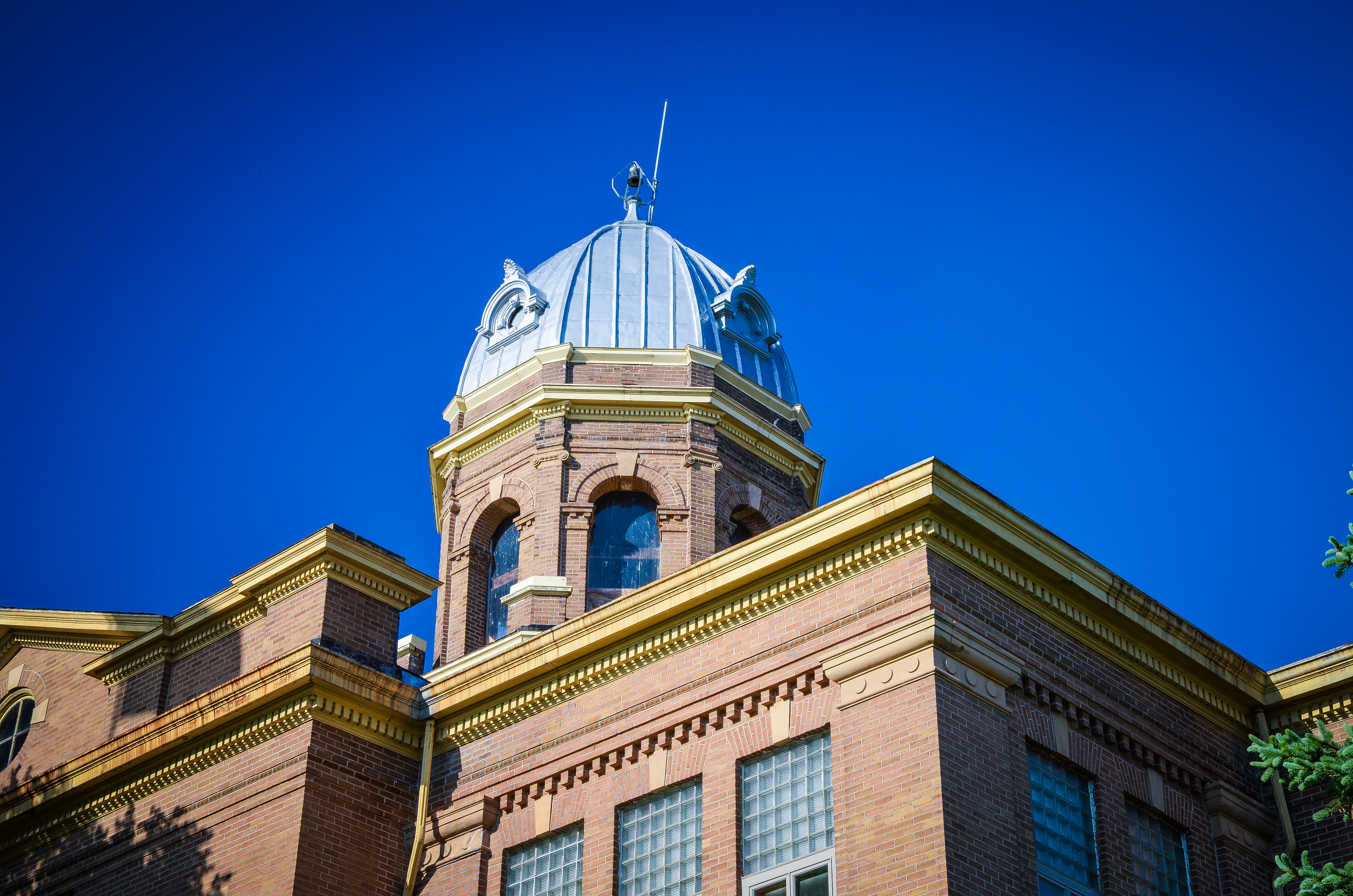
- Roberts County Courthouse

- Location within the U.S. state of South Dakota
- Coordinates: 45°37′24.229″N 96°56′51.183″W
- Country: United States
- State: South Dakota
- Founded: March 8, 1883 (organized); August 6, 1883 (organized)
- Named for: S. G. Roberts
- Seat: Sisseton
- Largest city: Sisseton

Area
  - Total: 1,135.777 sq mi (2,941.65 km^{2})
  - Land: 1,101.055 sq mi (2,851.72 km^{2})
  - Water: 34.722 sq mi (89.93 km^{2}) 3.1%

Population (2020)
  - Total: 10,280
  - Estimate (2025): 10,255 ▼
  - Density: 9.3/sq mi (3.6/km^{2})
- Time zone: UTC−6 (Central)
  - Summer (DST): UTC−5 (CDT)
- Congressional district: At-large
- Website: robertscosd.gov

Roberts County is a county in the U.S. state of South Dakota. As of the 2020 census, the population was 10,280. Its county seat is Sisseton. The county was named for S. G. Roberts of Fargo, North Dakota. It was created on March 8, 1883, and fully organized by August 6 of that year. Its boundary was altered once, in 1885.

== Geography ==
Soils of Roberts County

Roberts County is at South Dakota's northeastern corner. Its eastern boundary abuts Minnesota (across the Bois de Sioux River), and its northern boundary abuts North Dakota. The Cottonwood Slough flows southward, draining the upper portion of the county into the River. The terrain consists of rolling hills, devoted to agriculture. The terrain slopes to the east; its highest point is on its upper western boundary line, at 2,047 ft (624 m) ASL.

According to the United States Census Bureau, the county has a total area of 1,135.777 square miles (2,941.65 km^{2}), of which 1,101.055 square miles (2,851.72 km^{2}) is land and 34.722 square miles (89.93 km^{2}) (3.1%) is water. It is the 26th largest county in South Dakota by total area. The Traverse Gap is in eastern Roberts County along the Minnesota border. The Lake Traverse Indian Reservation covers most of the county.

=== Major highways ===
- Interstate 29
- U.S. Route 12
- U.S. Route 81
- South Dakota Highway 10
- South Dakota Highway 15
- South Dakota Highway 25
- South Dakota Highway 106
- South Dakota Highway 109
- South Dakota Highway 123
- South Dakota Highway 127

=== Transit ===
- Jefferson Lines

=== Adjacent counties ===
- Richland County, North Dakota – north
- Traverse County, Minnesota – northeast
- Big Stone County, Minnesota – southeast
- Grant County – south
- Day County – southwest
- Marshall County – west

=== Protected areas ===
- Big Stone Island State Nature Area
- Crawford State Game Production Area
- Knutson State Game Production Area
- Harmon State Game Production Area
- Hartford Beach State Park
- Peever Slough State Game Production Area
- Sica Hollow State Park (part)
- White Rock State Game Production Area

=== Lakes and rivers ===
- Big Stone Lake
- Bois de Sioux River
- Clubhouse Lake
- Cottonwood Lake
- Dobberstien Slough
- Drywood Lakes
- Hurricane Lake
- Lake Bdesska
- Lake Traverse
- Little Minnesota River
- Oneroad Lake
- Owl Lake
- Round Lake
- Whetstone River (North fork)
- Whitestone Lake

== Demographics ==
Historical population
Census	Pop.	Note	%±
1890	1,997		—
1900	12,216		511.7%
1910	14,897		21.9%
1920	16,514		10.9%
1930	15,782		−4.4%
1940	15,887		0.7%
1950	14,929		−6.0%
1960	13,190		−11.6%
1970	11,678		−11.5%
1980	10,911		−6.6%
1990	9,914		−9.1%
2000	10,016		1.0%
2010	10,149		1.3%
2020	10,280		1.3%
2025 (est.)	10,255	▼	−0.2%
U.S. Decennial Census

=== 2020 census ===
As of the 2020 census, there were 10,280 people, 3,844 households, and 2,568 families residing in the county. The population density was 9.3 inhabitants per square mile (3.6/km^{2}), and there were 4,788 housing units, of which 19.7% were vacant; among occupied units, 69.1% were owner-occupied and 30.9% were renter-occupied, with homeowner and rental vacancy rates of 1.0% and 4.9%, respectively.

Of the residents, 28.1% were under the age of 18 and 20.9% were 65 years of age or older; the median age was 39.2 years. For every 100 females there were 103.1 males, and for every 100 females age 18 and over there were 100.5 males.

The racial makeup of the county was 54.5% White, 0.3% Black or African American, 39.1% American Indian and Alaska Native, 0.3% Asian, 0.7% from some other race, and 5.1% from two or more races. Hispanic or Latino residents of any race comprised 2.1% of the population.

There were 3,844 households in the county, of which 32.4% had children under the age of 18 living with them and 25.2% had a female householder with no spouse or partner present. About 29.6% of all households were made up of individuals and 14.8% had someone living alone who was 65 years of age or older.

=== 2010 census ===
As of the 2010 census, there were 10,149 people, 3,823 households, and 2,655 families residing in the county. The population density was 9.2 inhabitants per square mile (3.6/km^{2}). There were 4,905 housing units at an average density of 4.5 units per square mile (1.7 units/km^{2}). The racial makeup of the county was 61.7% white, 34.5% American Indian, 0.2% Asian, 0.1% black or African American, 0.4% from other races, and 3.0% from two or more races. Those of Hispanic or Latino origin made up 1.2% of the population. In terms of ancestry, 31.3% were German, 19.2% were Norwegian, 6.3% were Irish, and 3.8% were American.

Of the 3,823 households, 34.4% had children under the age of 18 living with them, 49.1% were married couples living together, 13.4% had a female householder with no husband present, 30.6% were non-families, and 27.3% of all households were made up of individuals. The average household size was 2.58 and the average family size was 3.11. The median age was 39.5 years.

The median income for a household in the county was $37,708 and the median income for a family was $46,146. Males had a median income of $34,080 versus $28,423 for females. The per capita income for the county was $19,825. About 14.3% of families and 20.0% of the population were below the poverty line, including 33.9% of those under age 18 and 11.0% of those age 65 or over.

== Communities ==
=== Cities ===
- Sisseton (county seat)
- Wilmot

=== Towns ===
- Claire City
- Corona
- New Effington
- Ortley
- Peever
- Rosholt
- Summit
- White Rock

=== Census-designated places ===
- Agency Village
- Goodwill (former)
- Long Hollow
- Peever Flats
- White Rock Colony

=== Unincorporated communities ===
- Hammer
- Hartford Beach
- Hiawatha Beach
- Lindon Beach
- Shady Beach
- Victor

=== Townships ===
- Agency
- Alto
- Becker
- Bossko
- Bryant
- Dry Wood Lake
- Easter
- Enterprise
- Garfield
- Geneseo
- Goodwill
- Grant
- Harmon
- Hart
- Lake
- Lawrence
- Lee
- Lien
- Lockwood
- Long Hollow
- Minnesota
- Norway
- One Road
- Rosholt
- Ortley
- Sisseton
- Springdale
- Spring Grove
- Summit
- Victor
- White Rock

== Politics ==
United States presidential election results for Roberts County, South Dakota
Year	Republican		Democratic		Third party(ies)	
Year	No.	%	No.	%	No.	%
1892	538	62.85%	68	7.94%	250	29.21%
1896	1,324	58.20%	929	40.84%	22	0.97%
1900	1,875	62.11%	1,067	35.34%	77	2.55%
1904	2,282	75.02%	584	19.20%	176	5.79%
1908	1,562	61.02%	777	30.35%	221	8.63%
1912	0	0.00%	812	33.02%	1,647	66.98%
1916	1,259	47.17%	1,191	44.62%	219	8.21%
1920	2,335	49.73%	447	9.52%	1,913	40.75%
1924	1,744	40.99%	215	5.05%	2,296	53.96%
1928	2,966	52.73%	2,619	46.56%	40	0.71%
1932	1,381	21.69%	4,440	69.72%	547	8.59%
1936	1,934	32.50%	3,820	64.19%	197	3.31%
1940	3,504	48.30%	3,750	51.70%	0	0.00%
1944	2,721	47.36%	3,024	52.64%	0	0.00%
1948	2,211	39.12%	3,277	57.98%	164	2.90%
1952	3,566	58.56%	2,524	41.44%	0	0.00%
1956	2,854	46.79%	3,246	53.21%	0	0.00%
1960	2,857	48.05%	3,089	51.95%	0	0.00%
1964	1,931	35.12%	3,567	64.88%	0	0.00%
1968	2,225	42.68%	2,651	50.85%	337	6.46%
1972	2,187	42.29%	2,976	57.54%	9	0.17%
1976	1,915	39.73%	2,890	59.96%	15	0.31%
1980	2,904	57.98%	1,829	36.51%	276	5.51%
1984	2,767	57.17%	2,063	42.62%	10	0.21%
1988	2,012	46.67%	2,267	52.59%	32	0.74%
1992	1,437	34.87%	1,716	41.64%	968	23.49%
1996	1,646	37.99%	2,186	50.45%	501	11.56%
2000	2,237	54.91%	1,700	41.73%	137	3.36%
2004	2,396	48.09%	2,527	50.72%	59	1.18%
2008	1,781	39.26%	2,672	58.91%	83	1.83%
2012	1,883	44.24%	2,302	54.09%	71	1.67%
2016	2,144	55.13%	1,540	39.60%	205	5.27%
2020	2,404	55.82%	1,828	42.44%	75	1.74%
2024	2,514	60.59%	1,560	37.60%	75	1.81%

== Notable people ==
- Sleepy Eye, Sisseton Sioux chief
- Gene Okerlund, wrestling announcer

== Education ==
School districts include:

- Big Stone City School District 25-1
- Milbank School District 25-4
- Rosholt School District 54-4
- Sisseton School District 54-2
- Summit School District 54-6
- Waubay School District 18-3
- Wilmot School District 54-7

== See also ==
- National Register of Historic Places listings in Roberts County, South Dakota
