= Big Stone City School District 25-1 =

School district in South Dakota, United States

Address
- 655 Walnut Street Big Stone City, South Dakota, 57216; United States

District information
- Type: Public
- Grades: PreK–12
- NCES District ID: 4606960

Students and staff
- Students: 52
- Teachers: 11.37
- Staff: 11.81
- Student–teacher ratio: 4.57

Other information
- Website: www.bigstonecity.k12.sd.us

Big Stone City School District #25-1 is a school district headquartered in Big Stone City, South Dakota.

Most of the district is in Grant County, where it includes Big Stone City and portions of Big Stone Township. It also covers a portion of Lockwood Township, Roberts County.

As of 2019 Christopher Folk is the CEO/Business Manager of the district.
