= Tom Patterson (entrepreneur) =

American entrepreneur (born 1979)

- Tom Patterson accepting an EY Entrepreneur of the Year award
- Born: February 12, 1979 (age 47)
- Education: Arizona State University
- Occupation: Businessperson
- Years active: 2008–present
- Known for: Founder and CEO of Tommy John

Tom Patterson (born February 12, 1979) is an American entrepreneur, who founded the Tommy John company in 2008.

== Early life ==
Patterson was raised in South Dakota. He graduated from Milbank High School in 1998 and went on to attend Arizona State University, where he graduated with a degree in business communications.

== Career ==
Patterson began his career as a medical device salesman, a position from which he was released in wake of the Great Recession. Frequently wearing business attire as part of his position, Patterson became irritated with the fit of his undershirts, which led him to design a new undershirt for himself.

After being let go from his sales job, Patterson began selling his undershirts from his apartment in San Diego. He founded Tommy John with his wife, Erin Fujimoto, in 2008. Lacking a background in fashion, Patterson used his sales skills from his previous position to expand the company. Under his leadership, Tommy John expanded their product range to include socks, sportswear, and underwear, The company was incorporated in 2012 and is headquartered in New York City.

== Accolades ==
Patterson was included in Crain's New York Business magazine's "Forty under 40" list in 2016, and he was named EY's Entrepreneur of the Year New York for Retail and Consumer Goods in 2017.
