= Altamont, South Dakota =

- Town
- Location in Deuel County and the state of South Dakota
- Coordinates: 44°50′27″N 96°41′25″W
- Country: United States
- State: South Dakota
- County: Deuel
- Incorporated: 1903

Area
  - Total: 1.25 sq mi (3.25 km^{2})
  - Land: 1.25 sq mi (3.25 km^{2})
  - Water: 0 sq mi (0.00 km^{2})
- Elevation: 1,844 ft (562 m)

Population (2020)
  - Total: 32
  - Density: 25.5/sq mi (9.85/km^{2})
- Time zone: UTC-6 (Central (CST))
  - Summer (DST): UTC-5 (CDT)
- ZIP code: 57226
- Area code: 605
- FIPS code: 46-01140
- GNIS feature ID: 1267265

Altamont is a town in Deuel County, South Dakota, United States. The population was 32 at the 2020 census.

== History ==
Altamont was platted in 1880. It was named for the hills surrounding the town site. The name means "high mountain."

== Geography ==
Altamont is located on State Route 15, approximately 6 miles (9.7 km) north of the city of Clear Lake.

=== Transportation ===
According to the United States Census Bureau, the town has a total area of 1.25 square miles (3.24 km^{2}), all land.

== Demographics ==
Historical population
Census	Pop.	Note	%±
1910	110		—
1920	116		5.5%
1930	123		6.0%
1940	144		17.1%
1950	76		−47.2%
1960	77		1.3%
1970	54		−29.9%
1980	58		7.4%
1990	48		−17.2%
2000	34		−29.2%
2010	34		0.0%
2020	32		−5.9%
U.S. Decennial Census

=== 2010 census ===
As of the census of 2010, there were 34 people, 14 households, and 7 families residing in the town. The population density was 27.2 inhabitants per square mile (10.5/km^{2}). There were 17 housing units at an average density of 13.6 per square mile (5.3/km^{2}). The racial makeup of the town was 97.1% White and 2.9% from two or more races.

There were 14 households, of which 35.7% had children under the age of 18 living with them, 42.9% were married couples living together, 7.1% had a female householder with no husband present, and 50.0% were non-families. 50.0% of all households were made up of individuals, and 28.6% had someone living alone who was 65 years of age or older. The average household size was 2.43 and the average family size was 3.71.

The median age in the town was 33.5 years. 35.3% of residents were under the age of 18; 2.9% were between the ages of 18 and 24; 29.4% were from 25 to 44; 14.7% were from 45 to 64; and 17.6% were 65 years of age or older. The gender makeup of the town was 52.9% male and 47.1% female.

=== 2000 census ===
As of the census of 2000, there were 34 people, 16 households, and 10 families residing in the town. The population density was 26.9 inhabitants per square mile (10.4/km^{2}). There were 18 housing units at an average density of 14.2 per square mile (5.5/km^{2}). The racial makeup of the town was 100.00% White.

There were 16 households, out of which 25.0% had children under the age of 18 living with them, 50.0% were married couples living together, 6.3% had a female householder with no husband present, and 37.5% were non-families. 31.3% of all households were made up of individuals, and 12.5% had someone living alone who was 65 years of age or older. The average household size was 2.13 and the average family size was 2.70.

In the town, the population was spread out, with 23.5% under the age of 18, 2.9% from 18 to 24, 41.2% from 25 to 44, 17.6% from 45 to 64, and 14.7% who were 65 years of age or older. The median age was 38 years. For every 100 females, there were 126.7 males. For every 100 females age 18 and over, there were 116.7 males.

The median income for a household in the town was $36,875, and the median income for a family was $67,500. Males had a median income of $43,750 versus $16,875 for females. The per capita income for the town was $16,559. There were no families and 20.5% of the population living below the poverty line, including no under eighteens and 100.0% of those over 64.
