= Alban Township, Grant County, South Dakota =

Township in South Dakota

Alban Township, South Dakota
- Township
- Location within South Dakota
- Coordinates: 45°20′52″N 96°56′04″W
- Country: United States
- State: South Dakota
- County: Grant

Area
  - Total: 54.1 sq mi (140 km^{2})

Population (2020)
  - Total: 598
- Area code: 605

Alban Township is a township in Grant County, South Dakota, United States. The population was 598 in the 2020 United States census.
