= Peever, South Dakota =

- Town
- Location in Roberts County and the state of South Dakota
- Coordinates: 45°32′32″N 96°57′22″W
- Country: United States
- State: South Dakota
- County: Roberts

Area
  - Total: 0.12 sq mi (0.32 km^{2})
  - Land: 0.12 sq mi (0.32 km^{2})
  - Water: 0 sq mi (0.00 km^{2})
- Elevation: 1,201 ft (366 m)

Population (2020)
  - Total: 180
  - Density: 1,451.2/sq mi (560.31/km^{2})
- Time zone: UTC-6 (Central (CST))
  - Summer (DST): UTC-5 (CDT)
- ZIP code: 57257
- Area code: 605
- FIPS code: 46-48940
- GNIS feature ID: 1267529

Peever is a town in Roberts County, South Dakota, United States. The population was 180 at the 2020 census.

Peever was laid out in 1898, and named in honor of Thomas Henry Peever, a settler.

== Geography ==
According to the United States Census Bureau, the town has a total area of 0.12 square miles (0.31 km^{2}), all land.

== Demographics ==
Historical population
Census	Pop.	Note	%±
1910	259		—
1920	386		49.0%
1930	265		−31.3%
1940	272		2.6%
1950	221		−18.7%
1960	208		−5.9%
1970	202		−2.9%
1980	232		14.9%
1990	195		−15.9%
2000	209		7.2%
2010	168		−19.6%
2020	180		7.1%
U.S. Decennial Census

=== 2010 census ===
As of the census of 2010, there were 168 people, 56 households, and 47 families residing in the town. The population density was 1,400.0 inhabitants per square mile (540.5/km^{2}). There were 63 housing units at an average density of 525.0 per square mile (202.7/km^{2}). The racial makeup of the town was 28.6% White, 65.5% Native American, 0.6% from other races, and 5.4% from two or more races. Hispanic or Latino of any race were 2.4% of the population.

There were 56 households, of which 55.4% had children under the age of 18 living with them, 41.1% were married couples living together, 33.9% had a female householder with no husband present, 8.9% had a male householder with no wife present, and 16.1% were non-families. 12.5% of all households were made up of individuals, and 3.6% had someone living alone who was 65 years of age or older. The average household size was 3.00 and the average family size was 3.15.

The median age in the town was 28.5 years. 36.3% of residents were under the age of 18; 10.7% were between the ages of 18 and 24; 17.4% were from 25 to 44; 29.8% were from 45 to 64; and 6% were 65 years of age or older. The gender makeup of the town was 48.2% male and 51.8% female.

=== 2000 census ===
As of the census of 2000, there were 209 people, 61 households, and 50 families residing in the town. The population density was 1,504.5 inhabitants per square mile (580.9/km^{2}). There were 73 housing units at an average density of 525.5 per square mile (202.9/km^{2}). The racial makeup of the town was 31.58% White, 0.48% African American, 66.03% Native American, and 1.91% from two or more races. Hispanic or Latino of any race were 1.44% of the population.

There were 61 households, out of which 59.0% had children under the age of 18 living with them, 45.9% were married couples living together, 24.6% had a female householder with no husband present, and 18.0% were non-families. 18.0% of all households were made up of individuals, and 9.8% had someone living alone who was 65 years of age or older. The average household size was 3.43 and the average family size was 3.86.

In the town, the population was spread out, with 46.4% under the age of 18, 6.2% from 18 to 24, 28.2% from 25 to 44, 12.9% from 45 to 64, and 6.2% who were 65 years of age or older. The median age was 22 years. For every 100 females, there were 91.7 males. For every 100 females age 18 and over, there were 86.7 males.

The median income for a household in the town was $23,333, and the median income for a family was $24,583. Males had a median income of $21,719 versus $20,625 for females. The per capita income for the town was $8,695. About 30.6% of families and 36.2% of the population were below the poverty line, including 45.6% of those under the age of eighteen and 42.9% of those 65 or over.
