= Artas, South Dakota =

- Town
- Location in Campbell County and the state of South Dakota
- Coordinates: 45°53′14″N 99°48′24″W
- Country: United States
- State: South Dakota
- County: Campbell
- Incorporated: 1951

Area
  - Total: 0.10 sq mi (0.27 km^{2})
  - Land: 0.10 sq mi (0.27 km^{2})
  - Water: 0 sq mi (0.00 km^{2})
- Elevation: 1,821 ft (555 m)

Population (2020)
  - Total: 7
  - Density: 67.3/sq mi (25.98/km^{2})
- Time zone: UTC-6 (Central (CST))
  - Summer (DST): UTC-5 (CDT)
- Area code: 605
- FIPS code: 46-02340
- GNIS feature ID: 1267269

Artas is a town in Campbell County, South Dakota, United States. The population was 7 at the 2020 census. Artas ties with White Rock as the 3rd least populous municipality in South Dakota.

== History ==
Artas was platted in 1901 when a new Campbell County branch line of the Minneapolis, St. Paul and Sault Ste. Marie Railroad was extended from North Dakota to that point. Artas is a name derived from Greek, meaning "bread", the town being located in the Wheat belt. A post office was established at Artas in 1901.

== Geography ==
According to the United States Census Bureau, the town has a total area of 0.10 square miles (0.26 km^{2}), all land.

== Demographics ==
Historical population
Census	Pop.	Note	%±
1960	87		—
1970	73		−16.1%
1980	43		−41.1%
1990	28		−34.9%
2000	13		−53.6%
2010	9		−30.8%
2020	7		−22.2%
U.S. Decennial Census

=== 2010 census ===
As of the census of 2010, there were 9 people, 6 households, and 2 families residing in the town. The population density was 90.0 inhabitants per square mile (34.7/km^{2}). There were 17 housing units at an average density of 170.0 per square mile (65.6/km^{2}). The racial makeup of the town was 100.0% White.

There were 6 households, of which 33.3% were married couples living together and 66.7% were non-families. 50.0% of all households were made up of individuals, and 16.7% had someone living alone who was 65 years of age or older. The average household size was 1.50 and the average family size was 2.00.

The median age in the town was 68.3 years. 0.0% of residents were under the age of 18; 0.0% were between the ages of 18 and 24; 0.0% were from 25 to 44; 44.4% were from 45 to 64; and 55.6% were 65 years of age or older. The gender makeup of the town was 44.4% male and 55.6% female.

=== 2000 census ===
As of the census of 2000, there were 13 people, 10 households, and 3 families residing in the town. The population density was 120.7 inhabitants per square mile (46.6/km^{2}). There were 17 housing units at an average density of 157.9 per square mile (61.0/km^{2}). The racial makeup of the town was 100.00% White.

There were 10 households, out of which 10.0% had children under the age of 18 living with them, 20.0% were married couples living together, 10.0% had a female householder with no husband present, and 70.0% were non-families. 70.0% of all households were made up of individuals, and 50.0% had someone living alone who was 65 years of age or older. The average household size was 1.30 and the average family size was 2.00.

In the town, the population was spread out, with 7.7% under the age of 18, 30.8% from 25 to 44, 23.1% from 45 to 64, and 38.5% who were 65 years of age or older. The median age was 58 years. For every 100 females, there were 62.5 males. For every 100 females age 18 and over, there were 71.4 males.

The median income for a household in the town was $3,750, and the median income for a family was $0. Males had a median income of $0 versus $0 for females. The per capita income for the town was $7,057. There were no families and 71.4% of the population living below the poverty line, including no under eighteens and 100.0% of those over 64.
