= Grant County, South Dakota =

County in South Dakota, United States

- County
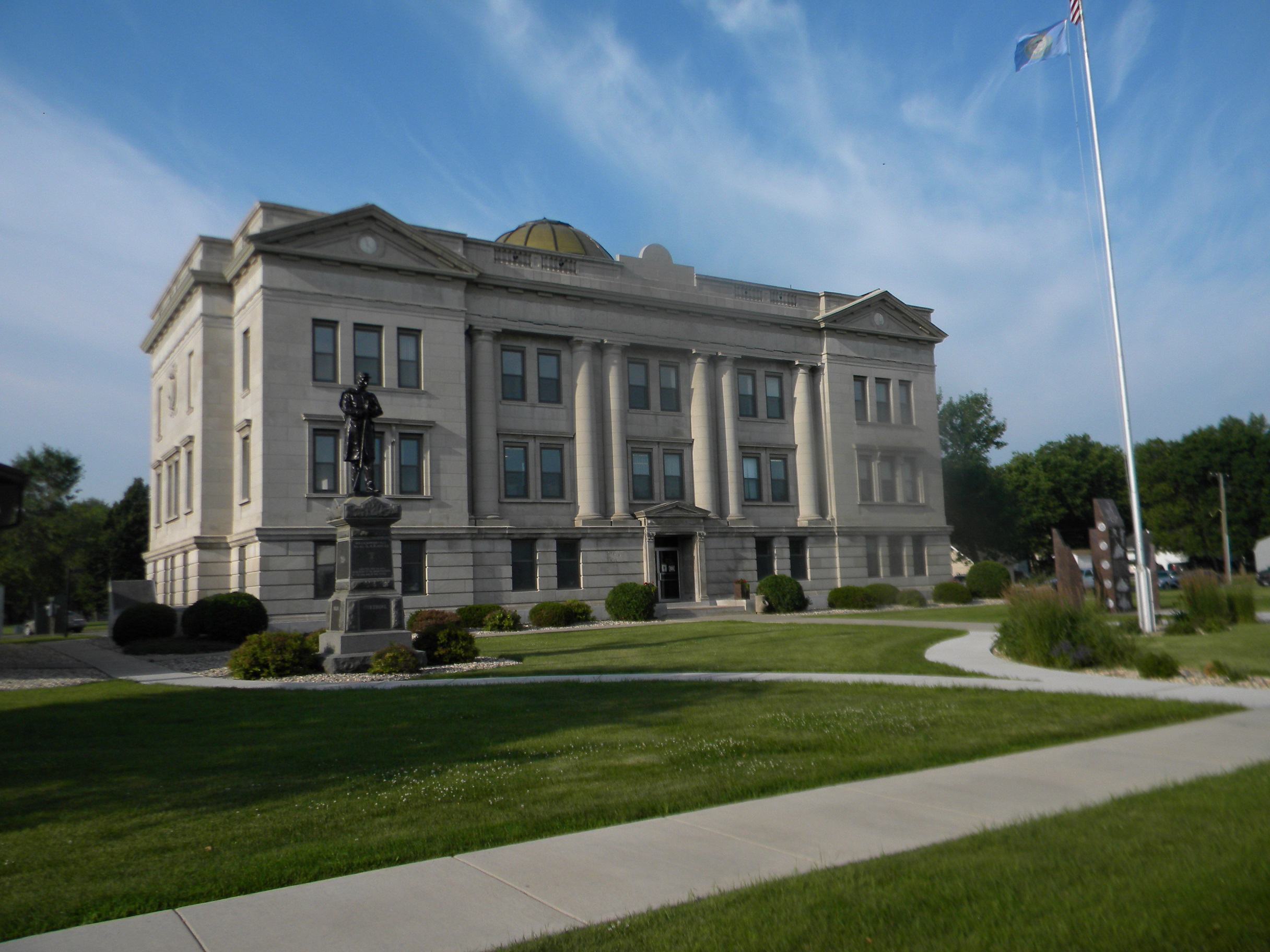
- County Courthouse

- Location within the U.S. state of South Dakota
- Coordinates: 45°10′N 96°46′W
- Country: United States
- State: South Dakota
- Founded: 1873 (created); January 8, 1878 (organized)
- Named for: Ulysses S. Grant
- Seat: Milbank
- Largest city: Milbank

Area
  - Total: 688 sq mi (1,780 km^{2})
  - Land: 681 sq mi (1,760 km^{2})
  - Water: 6.1 sq mi (16 km^{2}) 0.9%

Population (2020)
  - Total: 7,556
  - Estimate (2025): 7,534 ▼
  - Density: 11.1/sq mi (4.28/km^{2})
- Time zone: UTC−6 (Central)
  - Summer (DST): UTC−5 (CDT)
- Congressional district: At-large
- Website: grantcounty.sd.gov

Grant County is a county in the U.S. state of South Dakota. As of the 2020 census, the population was 7,556. The county seat is Milbank. The county was founded in 1873 and organized in 1878. It is named for Ulysses S. Grant, 18th President of the United States.

== Geography ==
Soils of Grant County

Grant County lies on the east side of South Dakota. Its east boundary line abuts the west boundary line of the state of Minnesota. The terrain consists of rolling hills, sloping to the northeast. The area is largely devoted to agriculture. The highest point of the terrain is on the county's south boundary line, towards its southwest corner, at 2,014 ft (614 m) ASL.

Grant County has a total area of 688 square miles (1,780 km^{2}), of which 681 square miles (1,760 km^{2}) is land and 6.1 square miles (16 km^{2}) (0.9%) is water.

The lowest point in the state of South Dakota is located on Big Stone Lake at Big Stone City in Grant County, adjacent to Ortonville, Minnesota, where the lake flows into the Minnesota River.

=== Major highways ===
- Interstate 29
- U.S. Route 12
- U.S. Route 81
- South Dakota Highway 15
- South Dakota Highway 20
- South Dakota Highway 109
- South Dakota Highway 123
- South Dakota Highway 158

=== Adjacent counties ===
- Roberts County—north
- Big Stone County, Minnesota—northeast
- Lac qui Parle County, Minnesota—east
- Deuel County—south
- Codington County—southwest
- Day County—west

=== Protected areas ===
- Mazeppa State Public Shooting Area
- Mud Lake State Public Shooting Area

=== Lakes ===
- Big Stone Lake (adjacent)
- Crooked Lake
- LaBolt Lake
- Lake Albert
- Lake Farley
- Lonesome Lake (partial)
- Mud Lake
- Myers Lake
- Summit Lake
- Twin Lakes

== Demographics ==
Historical population
Census	Pop.	Note	%±
1880	3,010		—
1890	6,814		126.4%
1900	9,103		33.6%
1910	10,303		13.2%
1920	10,880		5.6%
1930	10,729		−1.4%
1940	10,552		−1.6%
1950	10,233		−3.0%
1960	9,913		−3.1%
1970	9,005		−9.2%
1980	9,013		0.1%
1990	8,372		−7.1%
2000	7,847		−6.3%
2010	7,356		−6.3%
2020	7,556		2.7%
2025 (est.)	7,534	▼	−0.3%
U.S. Decennial Census; 1790–1960 1900–1990; 1990–2000 2010–2020

=== 2020 census ===
As of the 2020 census, there were 7,556 people, 3,103 households, and 2,014 families residing in the county, for a population density of 11.1 inhabitants per square mile (4.3/km^{2}) and 3,426 housing units.

The racial makeup of the county was 90.6% White, 0.0% Black or African American, 1.2% American Indian and Alaska Native, 0.2% Asian, 3.5% from some other race, and 4.4% from two or more races. Hispanic or Latino residents of any race comprised 6.4% of the population.

Of the residents, 22.8% were under the age of 18 and 23.7% were 65 years of age or older; the median age was 44.8 years. For every 100 females there were 106.0 males, and for every 100 females age 18 and over there were 105.5 males.

Of the 3,103 households, 27.1% had children under the age of 18 living with them and 20.8% had a female householder with no spouse or partner present. About 31.6% of all households were made up of individuals and 16.1% had someone living alone who was 65 years of age or older.

There were 3,426 housing units, of which 9.4% were vacant. Among occupied housing units, 75.5% were owner-occupied and 24.5% were renter-occupied. The homeowner vacancy rate was 1.2% and the rental vacancy rate was 6.1%.

=== 2010 census ===
As of the 2010 census, there were 7,356 people, 3,089 households, and 2,076 families in the county. The population density was 10.8 inhabitants per square mile (4.2/km^{2}). There were 3,526 housing units at an average density of 5.2 units per square mile (2.0 units/km^{2}). The racial makeup of the county was 97.1% white, 0.5% American Indian, 0.3% Asian, 0.1% black or African American, 1.1% from other races, and 0.8% from two or more races. Those of Hispanic or Latino origin made up 2.3% of the population. In terms of ancestry, 49.9% were German, 16.8% were Norwegian, 8.9% were Irish, 6.7% were Swedish, 5.6% were English, and 5.2% were American.

Of the 3,089 households, 28.1% had children under the age of 18 living with them, 57.2% were married couples living together, 6.1% had a female householder with no husband present, 32.8% were non-families, and 29.6% of all households were made up of individuals. The average household size was 2.35 and the average family size was 2.89. The median age was 45.1 years.

The median income for a household in the county was $42,625 and the median income for a family was $56,250. Males had a median income of $36,204 versus $25,567 for females. The per capita income for the county was $22,887. About 7.0% of families and 11.6% of the population were below the poverty line, including 13.8% of those under age 18 and 17.8% of those age 65 or over.

== Communities ==
=== Cities ===
- Big Stone City
- Milbank (county seat)

=== Towns ===
- Albee
- La Bolt
- Marvin
- Revillo
- Stockholm
- Strandburg
- Twin Brooks

=== Unincorporated community ===
- Troy

=== Townships ===
- Adams
- Alban
- Big Stone
- Blooming Valley
- Farmington
- Georgia
- Grant Center
- Kilborn
- Lura
- Madison
- Mazeppa
- Melrose
- Osceola
- Stockholm
- Troy
- Twin Brooks
- Vernon

== Education ==
School districts include:

- Big Stone City School District 25-1
- Deuel School District 19-4
- Florence School District 14-1
- Milbank School District 25-4
- Summit School District 54-6
- Watertown School District 14-4
- Waubay School District 18-3
- Waverly School District 14-5
- Wilmot School District 54-7

== Politics ==
Grant County voters have been reliably Republican for decades. In only three national elections since 1948 has the county selected the Democratic Party candidate.

United States presidential election results for Grant County, South Dakota
Year	Republican		Democratic		Third party(ies)	
Year	No.	%	No.	%	No.	%
1892	605	40.74%	188	12.66%	692	46.60%
1896	1,029	52.72%	902	46.21%	21	1.08%
1900	1,305	62.86%	716	34.49%	55	2.65%
1904	1,454	77.05%	309	16.38%	124	6.57%
1908	1,122	59.87%	628	33.51%	124	6.62%
1912	0	0.00%	619	39.13%	963	60.87%
1916	1,098	55.31%	772	38.89%	115	5.79%
1920	1,813	59.99%	350	11.58%	859	28.42%
1924	1,227	42.02%	202	6.92%	1,491	51.06%
1928	2,508	59.49%	1,656	39.28%	52	1.23%
1932	1,515	33.88%	2,887	64.56%	70	1.57%
1936	1,847	45.50%	2,101	51.76%	111	2.73%
1940	2,981	59.38%	2,039	40.62%	0	0.00%
1944	2,278	60.70%	1,475	39.30%	0	0.00%
1948	1,972	48.57%	2,052	50.54%	36	0.89%
1952	3,234	68.31%	1,500	31.69%	0	0.00%
1956	2,621	55.87%	2,070	44.13%	0	0.00%
1960	2,611	55.26%	2,114	44.74%	0	0.00%
1964	1,854	41.78%	2,583	58.22%	0	0.00%
1968	2,259	51.81%	1,890	43.35%	211	4.84%
1972	2,247	50.04%	2,231	49.69%	12	0.27%
1976	2,051	45.95%	2,398	53.72%	15	0.34%
1980	2,691	58.58%	1,602	34.87%	301	6.55%
1984	2,738	62.80%	1,606	36.83%	16	0.37%
1988	2,148	51.49%	1,988	47.65%	36	0.86%
1992	1,595	38.81%	1,484	36.11%	1,031	25.09%
1996	1,782	43.64%	1,805	44.21%	496	12.15%
2000	2,235	58.36%	1,475	38.51%	120	3.13%
2004	2,392	58.48%	1,633	39.93%	65	1.59%
2008	1,951	50.94%	1,786	46.63%	93	2.43%
2012	2,034	56.41%	1,493	41.40%	79	2.19%
2016	2,382	66.84%	971	27.24%	211	5.92%
2020	2,618	69.91%	1,056	28.20%	71	1.90%
2024	2,594	71.46%	946	26.06%	90	2.48%

== See also ==
- National Register of Historic Places listings in Grant County, South Dakota
