= Hidewood Creek =

Stream in South Dakota, U.S.

Coordinates: 44°35′32″N 96°56′32″W

Hidewood Creek is a stream in the U.S. state of South Dakota.

Hidewood Creek was so named because Indians hid in the woods near it.

== See also ==
- List of rivers of South Dakota
