= Milbank, South Dakota =

Milbank
- City
- Milbank, South Dakota
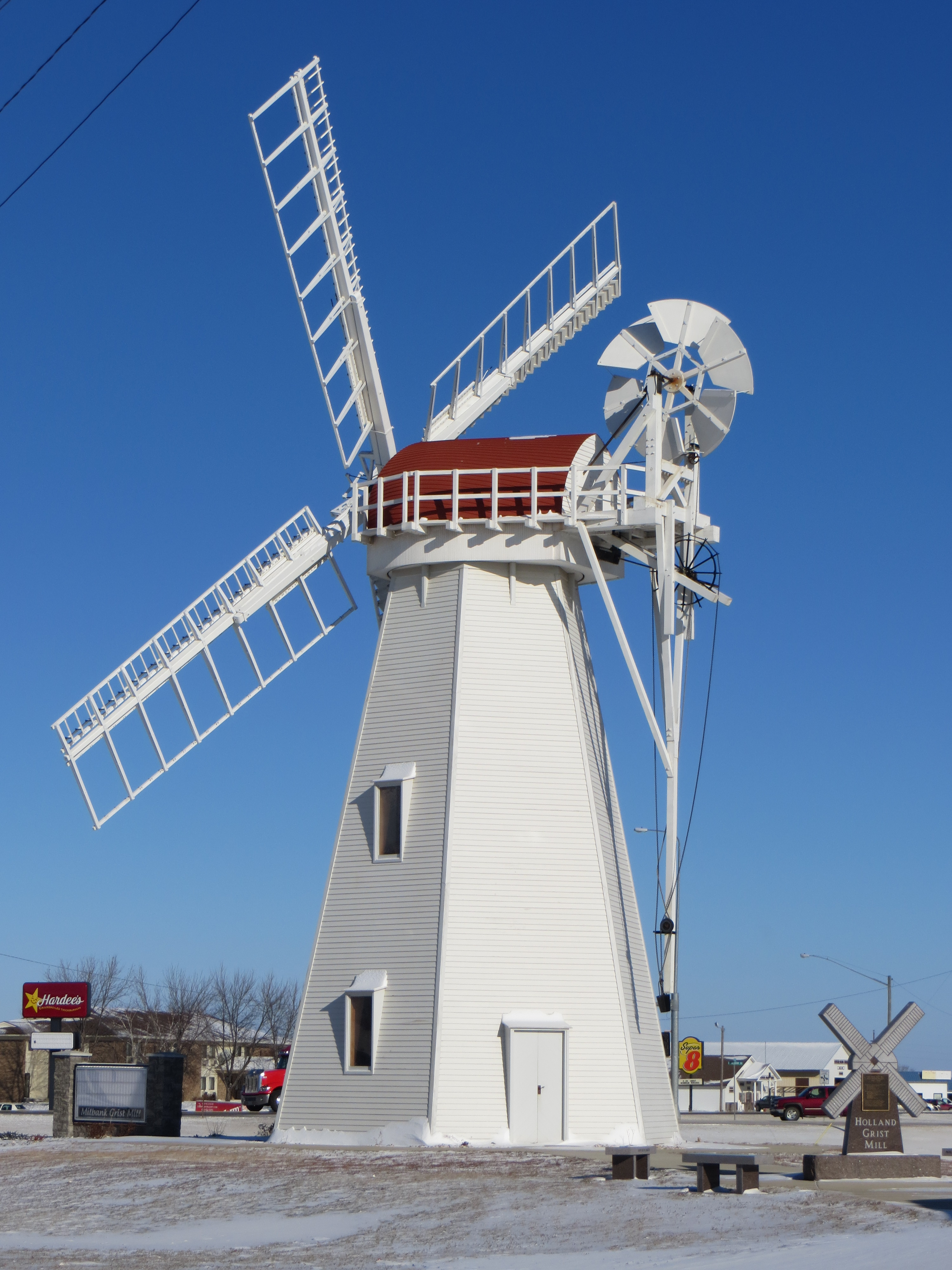
- Hollands Grist Windmill, Milbank, South Dakota
- Motto: "You'll Like Milbank"
- Location in Grant County and the state of South Dakota
- Coordinates: 45°13′10″N 96°38′02″W
- Country: United States
- State: South Dakota
- County: Grant
- Incorporated: 1881

Government
  - Mayor: Pat Raffety

Area
  - Total: 2.86 sq mi (7.40 km^{2})
  - Land: 2.78 sq mi (7.19 km^{2})
  - Water: 0.085 sq mi (0.22 km^{2})
- Elevation: 1,152 ft (351 m)

Population (2020)
  - Total: 3,544
  - Density: 1,280/sq mi (493/km^{2})
- Time zone: UTC−6 (Central (CST))
  - Summer (DST): UTC−5 (CDT)
- ZIP codes: 57252-57253
- Area code: 605
- FIPS code: 46-42260
- GNIS feature ID: 1267476
- Website: www.milbanksd.com

Milbank is a city in Grant County, South Dakota, United States, located along the South Fork of the Whetstone River. The population was 3,544 at the 2020 census. It is the county seat of Grant County. Milbank is the birthplace of American Legion Baseball. The program was created in Milbank in 1925 and is now enjoyed by high school-aged youth on more than five thousand teams in all fifty states.

== History ==
The city was founded in 1880 when the Chicago, Milwaukee and St. Paul Railway first laid rails into South Dakota. It was named in honor of railroad director Jeremiah Milbank. The city was incorporated in 1881.

== Geography ==
According to the United States Census Bureau, the city has a total area of 2.84 square miles (7.36 km^{2}), of which 2.76 square miles (7.15 km^{2}) is land and 0.08 square miles (0.21 km^{2}) is water.

== Demographics ==
Historical population
Census	Pop.	Note	%±
1890	1,207		—
1900	1,426		18.1%
1910	2,015		41.3%
1920	2,215		9.9%
1930	2,389		7.9%
1940	2,745		14.9%
1950	2,982		8.6%
1960	3,500		17.4%
1970	3,727		6.5%
1980	4,120		10.5%
1990	3,879		−5.8%
2000	3,640		−6.2%
2010	3,353		−7.9%
2020	3,544		5.7%
U.S. Decennial Census; 2015 Estimate

=== 2020 census ===
As of the 2020 census, Milbank had a population of 3,544. The median age was 43.8 years. 22.9% of residents were under the age of 18 and 25.2% of residents were 65 years of age or older. For every 100 females there were 95.0 males, and for every 100 females age 18 and over there were 92.9 males age 18 and over.

0.0% of residents lived in urban areas, while 100.0% lived in rural areas.

There were 1,541 households in Milbank, of which 26.8% had children under the age of 18 living in them. Of all households, 43.7% were married-couple households, 22.5% were households with a male householder and no spouse or partner present, and 29.5% were households with a female householder and no spouse or partner present. About 40.6% of all households were made up of individuals and 21.2% had someone living alone who was 65 years of age or older.

There were 1,669 housing units, of which 7.7% were vacant. The homeowner vacancy rate was 1.6% and the rental vacancy rate was 5.5%.

Racial composition as of the 2020 census
Race	Number	Percent
White	3,127	88.2%
Black or African American	2	0.1%
American Indian and Alaska Native	53	1.5%
Asian	12	0.3%
Native Hawaiian and Other Pacific Islander	3	0.1%
Some other race	155	4.4%
Two or more races	192	5.4%
Hispanic or Latino (of any race)	287	8.1%

=== 2010 census ===
As of the census of 2010, there were 3,353 people, 1,508 households, and 898 families living in the city. The population density was 1,214.9 inhabitants per square mile (469.1/km^{2}). There were 1,683 housing units at an average density of 609.8 per square mile (235.4/km^{2}). The racial makeup of the city was 96.4% White, 0.2% African American, 0.4% Native American, 0.3% Asian, 1.8% from other races, and 0.9% from two or more races. Hispanic or Latino of any race were 3.2% of the population.

There were 1,508 households, of which 25.9% had children under the age of 18 living with them, 47.6% were married couples living together, 8.4% had a female householder with no husband present, 3.6% had a male householder with no wife present, and 40.5% were non-families. 36.7% of all households were made up of individuals, and 17.3% had someone living alone who was 65 years of age or older. The average household size was 2.16 and the average family size was 2.82.

The median age in the city was 46.3 years. 21.8% of residents were under the age of 18; 6.4% were between the ages of 18 and 24; 19.8% were from 25 to 44; 29.5% were from 45 to 64; and 22.3% were 65 years of age or older. The gender makeup of the city was 48.3% male and 51.7% female.

=== 2000 census ===
As of the census of 2000, there were 3,640 people, 1,533 households, and 964 families living in the city. The population density was 1,367.4 inhabitants per square mile (528.0/km^{2}). There were 1,698 housing units at an average density of 637.9 per square mile (246.3/km^{2}). The racial makeup of the city was 98.93% White, 0.03% African American, 0.08% Native American, 0.36% Asian, 0.14% from other races, and 0.47% from two or more races. Hispanic or Latino of any race were 0.36% of the population.

There were 1,533 households, out of which 30.6% had children under the age of 18 living with them, 52.4% were married couples living together, 7.5% had a female householder with no husband present, and 37.1% were non-families. 35.0% of all households were made up of individuals, and 19.9% had someone living alone who was 65 years of age or older. The average household size was 2.25 and the average family size was 2.90.

In the city, the population was spread out, with 24.9% under the age of 18, 6.1% from 18 to 24, 23.5% from 25 to 44, 21.2% from 45 to 64, and 24.3% who were 65 years of age or older. The median age was 42 years. For every 100 females, there were 85.0 males. For every 100 females age 18 and over, there were 81.4 males.

As of 2000, the median income for a household in the city was $28,194, and the median income for a family was $40,117. Males had a median income of $31,486 versus $20,890 for females. The per capita income for the city was $17,446. About 6.8% of families and 10.0% of the population were below the poverty line, including 9.4% of those under age 18 and 9.6% of those age 65 or over.

== Media ==
=== Newspaper ===
The Grant County Review is published weekly and provides extensive coverage of the news, sports, school and social activities in Grant County. Communities in the coverage area include Milbank, Big Stone City, Revillo, LaBolt, Stockholm, Strandburg, Summit, Marvin, Twin Brooks, Corona and Wilmot.

=== AM Radio ===
AM radio stations
Frequency	Call sign	Name	Format	Owner	City
1510 AM	KMSD	Home Town Radio	Classic Hits/News/Talk	Armada Media	Milbank

=== FM Radio ===
FM radio stations
Frequency	Call sign	Name	Format	Owner	Target city/market	City of license
98.3 FM	K252FB	Home Town Radio	Classic Hits/News/Talk; KMSD-AM translator	Armada Media	Milbank	Milbank
99.1 FM	KXLG		Classic Hits/News/Talk	Dakota Communications	Watertown	Milbank
104.3 FM	KKSD	104.3 The Fox	Classic Hits	Three Eagles Communications	Watertown	Milbank

== Notable people ==
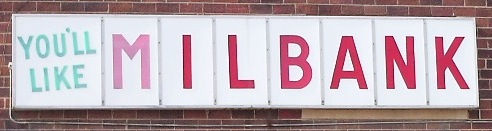
Milbank sign

- C. S. Amsden, President pro tempore of the South Dakota Senate and Speaker pro tempore of the South Dakota House of Representatives
- Kalen DeBoer, head football coach at the University of Alabama.
- Clarence (Pug) Manders, NFL running back for the Brooklyn Dodgers/Tigers.
- Jack Manders, NFL running back for the Chicago Bears.
- Dennis McCulloch, head football coach at Valley City State University
- Tom Patterson, an American entrepreneur, founded the Tommy John company in 2008.

== See also ==
- List of cities in South Dakota
