= Castle Rock, South Dakota =

Unincorporated community in South Dakota, U.S.

Coordinates: 44°57′52″N 103°25′28″W

Castle Rock is an unincorporated community in Butte County, in the U.S. state of South Dakota.

== History ==
A post office called Castle Rock was established in 1910, and remained in operation until 1972. The community took its name from Castle Rock Butte.

Today Castle Rock is grouped around a farm located on South Dakota Highway 79, approximately 17 miles north of Newell.
