= Hosmer, South Dakota =

- City
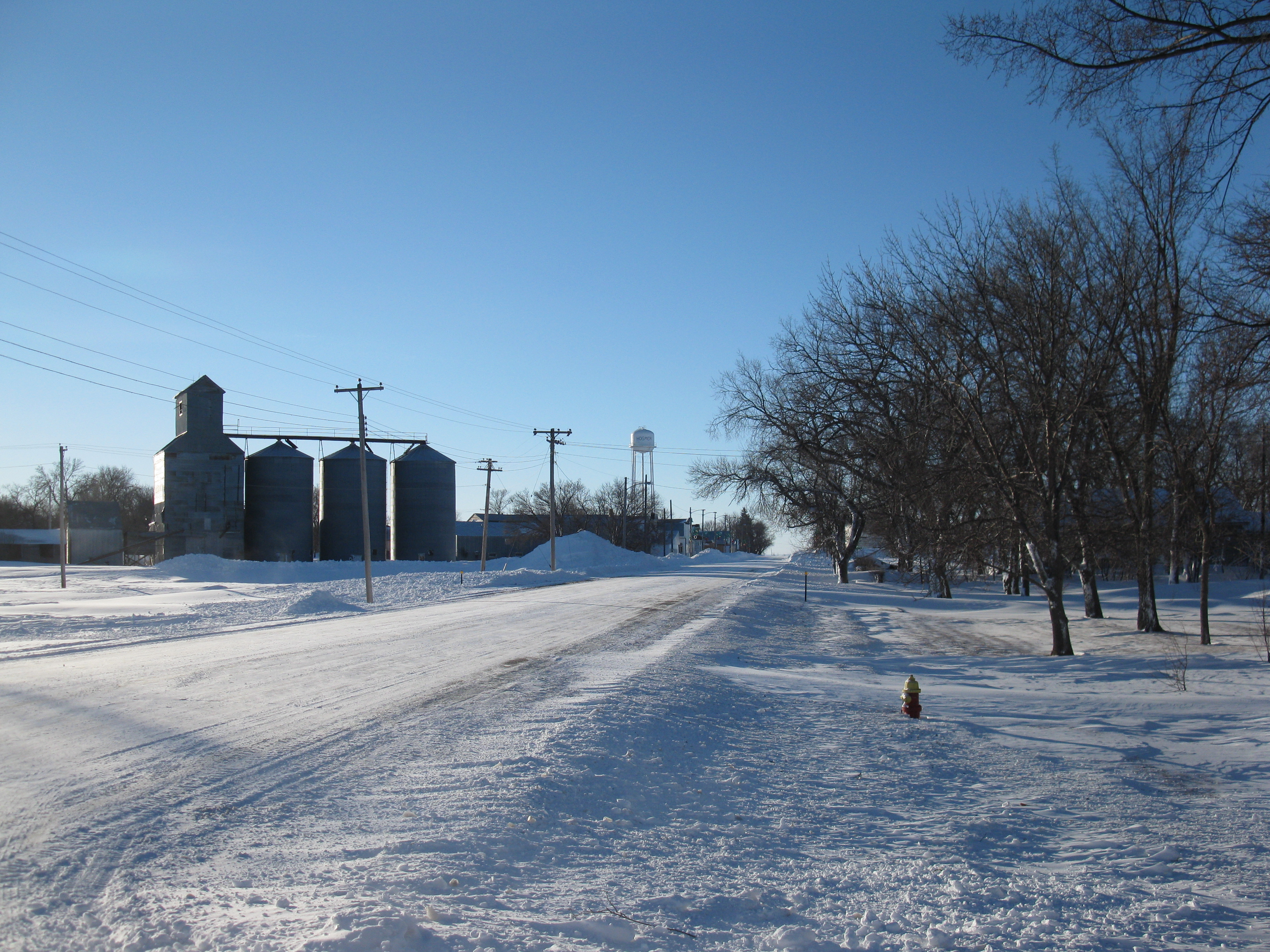
- Main Street of Hosmer, South Dakota in January 2011

- Location in Edmunds County and the state of South Dakota
- Coordinates: 45°34′44″N 99°28′25″W
- Country: United States
- State: South Dakota
- County: Edmunds
- Founded: 1887

Government
  - Mayor: Lew Paulson

Area
  - Total: 0.99 sq mi (2.56 km^{2})
  - Land: 0.99 sq mi (2.56 km^{2})
  - Water: 0 sq mi (0.00 km^{2})
- Elevation: 1,906 ft (581 m)

Population (2020)
  - Total: 164
  - Density: 165.8/sq mi (64.02/km^{2})
- Time zone: UTC-6 (Central (CST))
  - Summer (DST): UTC-5 (CDT)
- ZIP code: 57448
- Area code: 605
- FIPS code: 46-30140
- GNIS feature ID: 1267426
- Website: hosmer.municipalimpact.com

Hosmer is a city in northwestern Edmunds County, South Dakota, United States. The population was 164 at the 2020 census.

== History ==
Hosmer was laid out in 1887. The name for the town of Hosmer came from a railroad agent's wife's maiden name, Stella A. Hosmer.

== Geography ==
According to the United States Census Bureau, the city has a total area of 0.99 square miles (2.56 km^{2}), all land.

== Demographics ==
Historical population
Census	Pop.	Note	%±
1910	217		—
1920	419		93.1%
1930	524		25.1%
1940	579		10.5%
1950	533		−7.9%
1960	433		−18.8%
1970	437		0.9%
1980	385		−11.9%
1990	310		−19.5%
2000	287		−7.4%
2010	208		−27.5%
2020	164		−21.2%
U.S. Decennial Census

=== 2020 census ===
As of the 2020 census, Hosmer had a population of 164. The median age was 61.5 years. 11.6% of residents were under the age of 18 and 40.2% of residents were 65 years of age or older. For every 100 females there were 110.3 males, and for every 100 females age 18 and over there were 110.1 males age 18 and over.

0.0% of residents lived in urban areas, while 100.0% lived in rural areas.

There were 78 households in Hosmer, of which 9.0% had children under the age of 18 living in them. Of all households, 43.6% were married-couple households, 33.3% were households with a male householder and no spouse or partner present, and 19.2% were households with a female householder and no spouse or partner present. About 37.2% of all households were made up of individuals and 17.9% had someone living alone who was 65 years of age or older.

There were 120 housing units, of which 35.0% were vacant. The homeowner vacancy rate was 1.4% and the rental vacancy rate was 42.1%.

Racial composition as of the 2020 census
Race	Number	Percent
White	161	98.2%
Black or African American	1	0.6%
American Indian and Alaska Native	0	0.0%
Asian	0	0.0%
Native Hawaiian and Other Pacific Islander	0	0.0%
Some other race	0	0.0%
Two or more races	2	1.2%
Hispanic or Latino (of any race)	0	0.0%

=== 2010 census ===
As of the census of 2010, there were 208 people, 100 households, and 48 families residing in the city. The population density was 210.1 inhabitants per square mile (81.1/km^{2}). There were 151 housing units at an average density of 152.5 per square mile (58.9/km^{2}). The racial makeup of the city was 98.1% White, 0.5% Asian, and 1.4% from two or more races.

There were 100 households, of which 12.0% had children under the age of 18 living with them, 41.0% were married couples living together, 5.0% had a female householder with no husband present, 2.0% had a male householder with no wife present, and 52.0% were non-families. 48.0% of all households were made up of individuals, and 20% had someone living alone who was 65 years of age or older. The average household size was 1.81 and the average family size was 2.58.

The median age in the city was 57 years. 10.6% of residents were under the age of 18; 4.3% were between the ages of 18 and 24; 13% were from 25 to 44; 33.2% were from 45 to 64; and 38.9% were 65 years of age or older. The gender makeup of the city was 50.5% male and 49.5% female.

=== 2000 census ===
As of the census of 2000, there were 287 people, 115 households, and 67 families residing in the city. The population density was 288.2 inhabitants per square mile (111.3/km^{2}). There were 162 housing units at an average density of 162.7 per square mile (62.8/km^{2}). The racial makeup of the city was 98.95% White, 0.35% Asian, and 0.70% from two or more races. Hispanic or Latino of any race were 1.39% of the population.

There were 115 households, out of which 23.5% had children under the age of 18 living with them, 48.7% were married couples living together, 8.7% had a female householder with no husband present, and 41.7% were non-families. 37.4% of all households were made up of individuals, and 24.3% had someone living alone who was 65 years of age or older. The average household size was 2.20 and the average family size was 2.96.

In the city, the population was spread out, with 22.0% under the age of 18, 3.5% from 18 to 24, 17.8% from 25 to 44, 19.5% from 45 to 64, and 37.3% who were 65 years of age or older. The median age was 50 years. For every 100 females, there were 75.0 males. For every 100 females age 18 and over, there were 75.0 males.

The median income for a household in the city was $26,667, and the median income for a family was $37,813. Males had a median income of $23,438 versus $15,781 for females. The per capita income for the city was $13,952. None of the families and 8.3% of the population were living below the poverty line, including no under eighteens and 19.0% of those over 64.

== Schools ==
Hosmer was home to the Hosmer Tigers until the end of the 1990–1991 school year, when they combined with the Roscoe Hornets of Roscoe, South Dakota, to make Edmunds Central, home of the Raiders. The Hosmer school was then used for some of the Edmunds Central elementary classes. The school in Hosmer is now closed. Due to the state's open enrollment policy, parents may choose to send their children where they wish, although most primary and secondary students living in the Hosmer school district have continued attending Edmunds Central in Roscoe.

== See also ==
- List of cities in South Dakota
