= Twin Brooks, South Dakota =

- Town
- Location in Grant County and the state of South Dakota
- Coordinates: 45°12′32″N 96°47′08″W
- Country: United States
- State: South Dakota
- County: Grant
- Incorporated: 1902

Area
  - Total: 0.41 sq mi (1.05 km^{2})
  - Land: 0.41 sq mi (1.05 km^{2})
  - Water: 0 sq mi (0.00 km^{2})
- Elevation: 1,260 ft (380 m)

Population (2020)
  - Total: 47
  - Density: 115.9/sq mi (44.73/km^{2})
- Time zone: UTC-6 (Central (CST))
  - Summer (DST): UTC-5 (CDT)
- ZIP code: 57269
- Area code: 605
- FIPS code: 46-64700
- GNIS feature ID: 1267607

Twin Brooks is a town in Grant County, South Dakota, United States. The population was 47 at the 2020 census.

Twin Brooks was named for two small streams near the town site; an early variant name was Two Creeks.

== Geography ==
According to the United States Census Bureau, the town has a total area of 0.41 square miles (1.06 km^{2}), all land.

== Demographics ==
Historical population
Census	Pop.	Note	%±
1910	190		—
1920	141		−25.8%
1930	138		−2.1%
1940	121		−12.3%
1950	113		−6.6%
1960	86		−23.9%
1970	122		41.9%
1980	87		−28.7%
1990	54		−37.9%
2000	55		1.9%
2010	69		25.5%
2020	47		−31.9%
U.S. Decennial Census

=== 2010 census ===
As of the census of 2010, there were 69 people, 27 households, and 19 families residing in the town. The population density was 168.3 inhabitants per square mile (65.0/km^{2}). There were 31 housing units at an average density of 75.6 per square mile (29.2/km^{2}). The racial makeup of the town was 100.0% White.

There were 27 households, of which 25.9% had children under the age of 18 living with them, 59.3% were married couples living together, 11.1% had a female householder with no husband present, and 29.6% were non-families. 25.9% of all households were made up of individuals, and 11.1% had someone living alone who was 65 years of age or older. The average household size was 2.56 and the average family size was 3.05.

The median age in the town was 38.8 years. 24.6% of residents were under the age of 18; 7.2% were between the ages of 18 and 24; 23.1% were from 25 to 44; 33.3% were from 45 to 64; and 11.6% were 65 years of age or older. The gender makeup of the town was 58.0% male and 42.0% female.

=== 2000 census ===
As of the census of 2000, there were 55 people, 24 households, and 18 families residing in the town. The population density was 139.3 people per square mile (53.8 people/km^{2}). There were 28 housing units at an average density of 70.9 per square mile (27.4/km^{2}). The racial makeup of the town was 100.00% White.

There were 24 households, out of which 37.5% had children under the age of 18 living with them, 62.5% were married couples living together, 4.2% had a female householder with no husband present, and 25.0% were non-families. 20.8% of all households were made up of individuals, and 12.5% had someone living alone who was 65 years of age or older. The average household size was 2.29 and the average family size was 2.61.

In the town, the population was spread out, with 23.6% under the age of 18, 3.6% from 18 to 24, 30.9% from 25 to 44, 23.6% from 45 to 64, and 18.2% who were 65 years of age or older. The median age was 43 years. For every 100 females, there were 83.3 males. For every 100 females age 18 and over, there were 100.0 males.

The median income for a household in the town was $24,250, and the median income for a family was $34,063. Males had a median income of $26,042 versus $18,750 for females. The per capita income for the town was $14,485. There were 10.5% of families and 13.3% of the population living below the poverty line, including 30.0% of under eighteens and 16.7% of those over 64.
