= Hammer, South Dakota =

Unincorporated community in South Dakota, U.S.

Coordinates: 45°51′19″N 97°01′16″W

Hammer is an unincorporated community in Roberts County, in the U.S. state of South Dakota.

== History ==
A post office called Hammer was established in 1915, and remained in operation until 1973. The community was named after Gunder and Iver Hammer, the original owners of the town site.
