= Stockholm, South Dakota =

- Town
- Location in Grant County and the state of South Dakota
- Coordinates: 45°06′07″N 96°47′59″W
- Country: United States
- State: South Dakota
- County: Grant
- Incorporated: 1924

Area
  - Total: 0.44 sq mi (1.14 km^{2})
  - Land: 0.43 sq mi (1.12 km^{2})
  - Water: 0.0077 sq mi (0.02 km^{2})
- Elevation: 1,657 ft (505 m)

Population (2020)
  - Total: 102
  - Density: 235.3/sq mi (90.86/km^{2})
- Time zone: UTC-6 (Central (CST))
  - Summer (DST): UTC-5 (CDT)
- ZIP code: 57264
- Area code: 605
- FIPS code: 46-61740
- GNIS feature ID: 1267593

Stockholm is a town in Grant County, South Dakota, United States. The population was 102 at the 2020 census.

Stockholm was laid out in 1896 and named after the capital city of Sweden, the native land of a large share of the first settlers.

== Geography ==
According to the United States Census Bureau, the town has a total area of 0.44 square miles (1.14 km^{2}), of which 0.43 square miles (1.11 km^{2}) is land and 0.01 square miles (0.03 km^{2}) is water.

== Demographics ==
Historical population
Census	Pop.	Note	%±
1930	130		—
1940	114		−12.3%
1950	114		0.0%
1960	155		36.0%
1970	116		−25.2%
1980	95		−18.1%
1990	89		−6.3%
2000	105		18.0%
2010	108		2.9%
2020	102		−5.6%
U.S. Decennial Census

=== 2010 census ===
As of the 2010 census, there were 108 people, 48 households, and 27 families residing in the town. The population density was 251.2 inhabitants per square mile (97.0/km^{2}). There were 55 housing units at an average density of 127.9 per square mile (49.4/km^{2}). The racial makeup of the town was 91.7% White, 2.8% Native American, 0.9% from other races, and 4.6% from two or more races. Hispanic or Latino of any race were 0.9% of the population.

There were 48 households, of which 27.1% had children under the age of 18 living with them, 43.8% were married couples living together, 4.2% had a female householder with no husband present, 8.3% had a male householder with no wife present, and 43.8% were non-families. 33.3% of all households comprise individuals, and 12.5% had someone 65 years or older living alone. The average household size was 2.25, and the average family size was 2.89.

The median age in the town was 41.5 years. 21.3% of residents were under 18; 9.2% were between the ages of 18 and 24; 22.2% were from 25 to 44; 27.8% were from 45 to 64; and 19.4% were 65 years or older. The gender makeup of the town was 59.3% male and 40.7% female.

=== 2000 census ===
As of the 2000 census, 105 people, 48 households, and 28 families reside in the town. The population density was 239.3 inhabitants per square mile (92.4/km^{2}). There were 57 housing units at an average density of 129.9 per square mile (50.2/km^{2}). The town's racial makeup was 98.10% White, 0.95% Native American, and 0.95% from two or more races.

There were 48 households, of which 20.8% had children under 18 living with them, 52.1% were married couples living together, 2.1% had a female householder with no husband present, and 39.6% were non-families. 37.5% of all households comprised individuals, and 29.2% had someone 65 years or older living alone. The average household size was 2.19, and the average family size was 2.90.

The town's population was spread out, with 18.1% under 18, 8.6% from 18 to 24, 24.8% from 25 to 44, 21.9% from 45 to 64, and 26.7% aged 65 years or older. The median age was 44 years. For every 100 females, there were 118.8 males. For every 100 females age 18 and over, there were 104.8 males.

The median income for a household in the town was $39,375, and the median income for a family was $40,625. Males had a median income of $22,143 versus $31,250 for females. The per capita income for the town was $17,174. None of the population or families were below the poverty line.
