= Hartford Beach State Park =

State park in South Dakota, United States

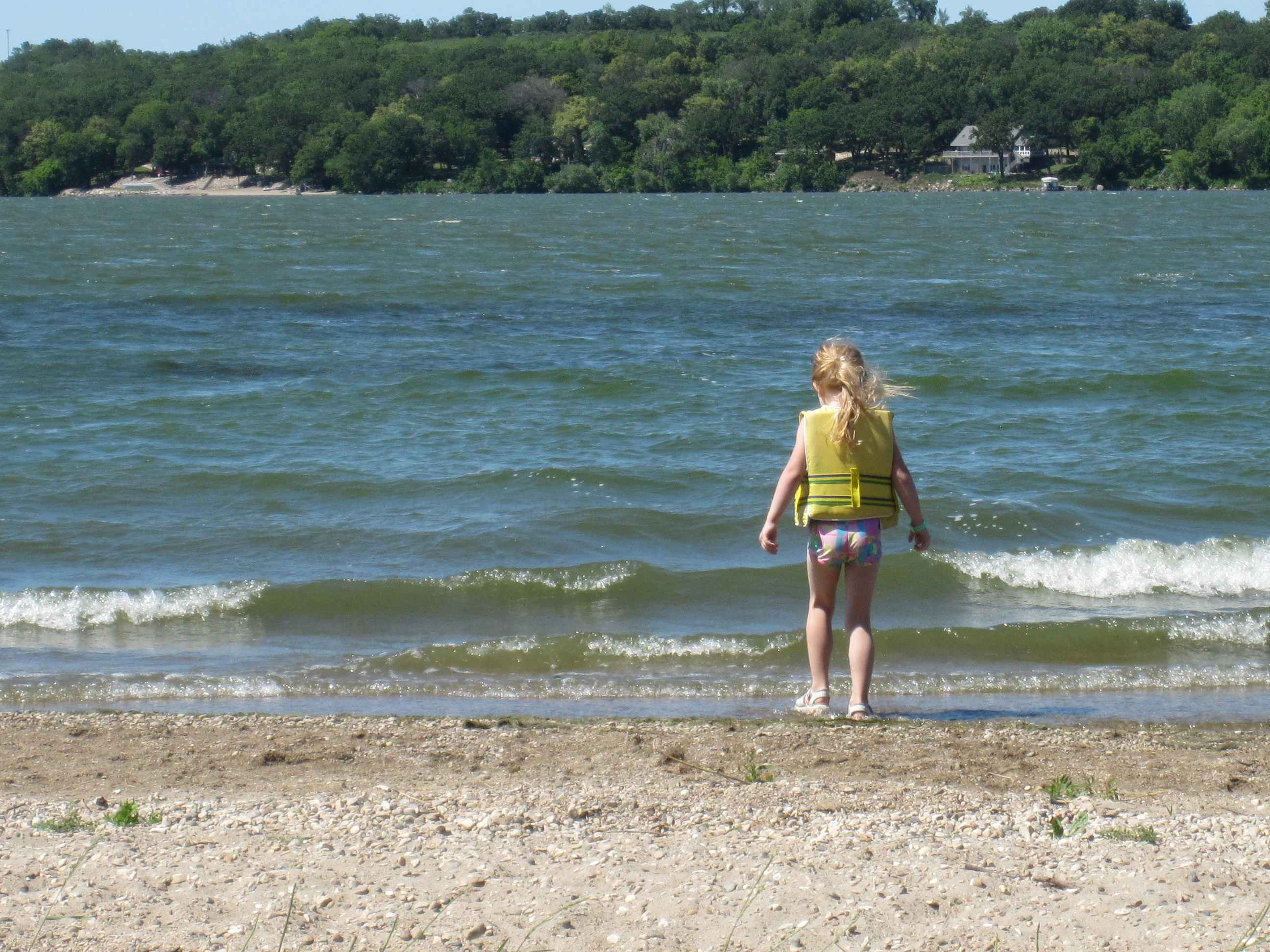

- Location within South Dakota Location within the United States
- Location: Roberts County, South Dakota, United States
- Coordinates: 45°24′08″N 96°40′23″W
- Area: 331 acres (134 ha)
- Established: 1945
- Administrator: South Dakota Department of Game, Fish and Parks
- Website: Official website

Hartford Beach State Park is a South Dakota state park on Big Stone Lake in Roberts County, South Dakota in the United States. The park's year-round recreational features include cabins, camping, swimming, fishing, hiking, disc golf, geocaching and boating.

== History ==
Hartford Beach was among three parks established in 1945 when the South Dakota Legislature created the statewide park system. The other two parks added to the system were Lake Herman State Park and Oakwood Lakes State Park. Up until that time, Custer State Park, which opened in 1919, was the only park managed by the state.

== See also ==
- List of South Dakota state parks
