= La Bolt, South Dakota =

- Town
- Location in Grant County and the state of South Dakota
- Coordinates: 45°02′57″N 96°40′31″W
- Country: United States
- State: South Dakota
- County: Grant
- Incorporated: 1901

Area
  - Total: 0.24 sq mi (0.62 km^{2})
  - Land: 0.24 sq mi (0.62 km^{2})
  - Water: 0 sq mi (0.00 km^{2})
- Elevation: 1,371 ft (418 m)

Population (2020)
  - Total: 66
  - Density: 277.2/sq mi (107.03/km^{2})
- Time zone: UTC-6 (Central (CST))
  - Summer (DST): UTC-5 (CDT)
- ZIP code: 57246
- Area code: 605
- FIPS code: 46-34540
- GNIS feature ID: 1267447

La Bolt is a town in Grant County, South Dakota, United States. The population was 66 at the 2020 census.

The town has the name of Alfred Labolt, a pioneer settler.

== Geography ==
According to the United States Census Bureau, the town has a total area of 0.24 square miles (0.62 km^{2}), all land.

== Demographics ==
Historical population
Census	Pop.	Note	%±
1920	142		—
1930	126		−11.3%
1940	127		0.8%
1950	164		29.1%
1960	125		−23.8%
1970	90		−28.0%
1980	94		4.4%
1990	91		−3.2%
2000	86		−5.5%
2010	68		−20.9%
2020	66		−2.9%
U.S. Decennial Census

=== 2010 census ===
As of the census of 2010, there were 68 people, 33 households, and 21 families residing in the town. The population density was 283.3 inhabitants per square mile (109.4/km^{2}). There were 37 housing units at an average density of 154.2 per square mile (59.5/km^{2}). The racial makeup of the town was 97.1% White, 1.5% Native American, and 1.5% from two or more races.

There were 33 households, of which 27.3% had children under the age of 18 living with them, 54.5% were married couples living together, 6.1% had a female householder with no husband present, 3.0% had a male householder with no wife present, and 36.4% were non-families. 36.4% of all households were made up of individuals, and 12.2% had someone living alone who was 65 years of age or older. The average household size was 2.06 and the average family size was 2.62.

The median age in the town was 49.3 years. 20.6% of residents were under the age of 18; 2.9% were between the ages of 18 and 24; 14.8% were from 25 to 44; 47.1% were from 45 to 64; and 14.7% were 65 years of age or older. The gender makeup of the town was 55.9% male and 44.1% female.

=== 2000 census ===
As of the census of 2000, there were 86 people, 31 households, and 19 families residing in the town. The population density was 358.2 inhabitants per square mile (138.3/km^{2}). There were 36 housing units at an average density of 150.0 per square mile (57.9/km^{2}). The racial makeup of the town was 95.35% White and 4.65% Native American.

There were 31 households, out of which 45.2% had children under the age of 18 living with them, 51.6% were married couples living together, 3.2% had a female householder with no husband present, and 38.7% were non-families. 38.7% of all households were made up of individuals, and 22.6% had someone living alone who was 65 years of age or older. The average household size was 2.77 and the average family size was 3.79.

In the town, the population was spread out, with 38.4% under the age of 18, 5.8% from 18 to 24, 30.2% from 25 to 44, 12.8% from 45 to 64, and 12.8% who were 65 years of age or older. The median age was 30 years. For every 100 females there were 91.1 males. For every 100 females age 18 and over, there were 120.8 males.

The median income for a household in the town was $41,667, and the median income for a family was $51,563. Males had a median income of $35,500 versus $25,313 for females. The per capita income for the town was $15,382. There were no families and 4.1% of the population living below the poverty line, including no under eighteens and 20.0% of those over 64.
