= Claire City, South Dakota =

- Town
- Location in Roberts County and the state of South Dakota
- Coordinates: 45°51′24″N 97°6′13″W
- Country: United States
- State: South Dakota
- County: Roberts
- Incorporated: 1913

Area
  - Total: 0.18 sq mi (0.47 km^{2})
  - Land: 0.18 sq mi (0.47 km^{2})
  - Water: 0 sq mi (0.00 km^{2})
- Elevation: 1,198 ft (365 m)

Population (2020)
  - Total: 82
  - Density: 448.2/sq mi (173.04/km^{2})
- Time zone: UTC-6 (Central (CST))
  - Summer (DST): UTC-5 (CDT)
- ZIP code: 57224
- Area code: 605
- FIPS code: 46-12020
- GNIS feature ID: 1267328

Claire City is a town in Roberts County, South Dakota, United States. The population was 82 at the 2020 census.

== History ==
Claire City was founded in 1913 and named by A. E. Feeney, one of the four donors of the town site, for his wife, Claire. Mrs. Feeney was still living on land adjoining the town in 1941. The post office in Claire City was established on November 21, 1913. The first postmaster was Ben Sandsmark; the post office moved into the Herb Bladow building in 1968.

== Geography ==
According to the United States Census Bureau, the town has a total area of 0.18 square miles (0.47 km^{2}), all land.

== Demographics ==
Historical population
Census	Pop.	Note	%±
1920	213		—
1930	193		−9.4%
1940	149		−22.8%
1950	109		−26.8%
1960	86		−21.1%
1970	100		16.3%
1980	87		−13.0%
1990	85		−2.3%
2000	85		0.0%
2010	76		−10.6%
2020	82		7.9%
U.S. Decennial Census

=== 2010 census ===
As of the census of 2010, there were 76 people, 33 households, and 25 families residing in the town. The population density was 422.2 inhabitants per square mile (163.0/km^{2}). There were 39 housing units at an average density of 216.7 per square mile (83.7/km^{2}). The racial makeup of the town was 78.9% White, 1.3% African American, 14.5% Native American, 3.9% from other races, and 1.3% from two or more races. Hispanic or Latino people of any race were 3.9% of the population.

There were 33 households, of which 27.3% had children under the age of 18 living with them, 60.6% were married couples living together, 9.1% had a female householder with no husband present, 6.1% had a male householder with no wife present, and 24.2% were non-families. 21.2% of all households were made up of individuals, and 6.1% had someone living alone who was 65 years of age or older. The average household size was 2.30 and the average family size was 2.64.

The median age in the town was 44.5 years. 19.7% of residents were under the age of 18; 11.7% were between the ages of 18 and 24; 18.5% were from 25 to 44; 35.5% were from 45 to 64; and 14.5% were 65 years of age or older. The gender makeup of the town was 53.9% male and 46.1% female.

=== 2000 census ===
As of the census of 2000, there were 85 people, 37 households, and 28 families residing in the town. The population density was 465.6 inhabitants per square mile (179.8/km^{2}). There were 42 housing units at an average density of 230.0 per square mile (88.8/km^{2}). The racial makeup of the town was 88.24% White and 11.76% Native American.

There were 37 households, out of which 35.1% had children under the age of 18 living with them, 59.5% were married couples living together, 10.8% had a female householder with no husband present, and 24.3% were non-families. 24.3% of all households were made up of individuals, and 10.8% had someone living alone who was 65 years of age or older. The average household size was 2.30 and the average family size was 2.64.

In the town, the population was spread out, with 24.7% under the age of 18, 7.1% from 18 to 24, 23.5% from 25 to 44, 35.3% from 45 to 64, and 9.4% who were 65 years of age or older. The median age was 38 years. For every 100 females, there were 88.9 males. For every 100 females age 18 and over, there were 100.0 males.

The median income for a household in the town of Claire City was $35,156, and the median income for a family was $29,375. Males had a median income of $35,556 versus $11,875 for females. The per capita income for the town was $17,074. There were 8.0% of families and 4.9% of the population living below the poverty line, including 11.8% of under eighteens and none of those over 64.
