= Wilmot, South Dakota =

Wilmot, South Dakota Otuŋwe Čistiŋna (Dakota)
- City
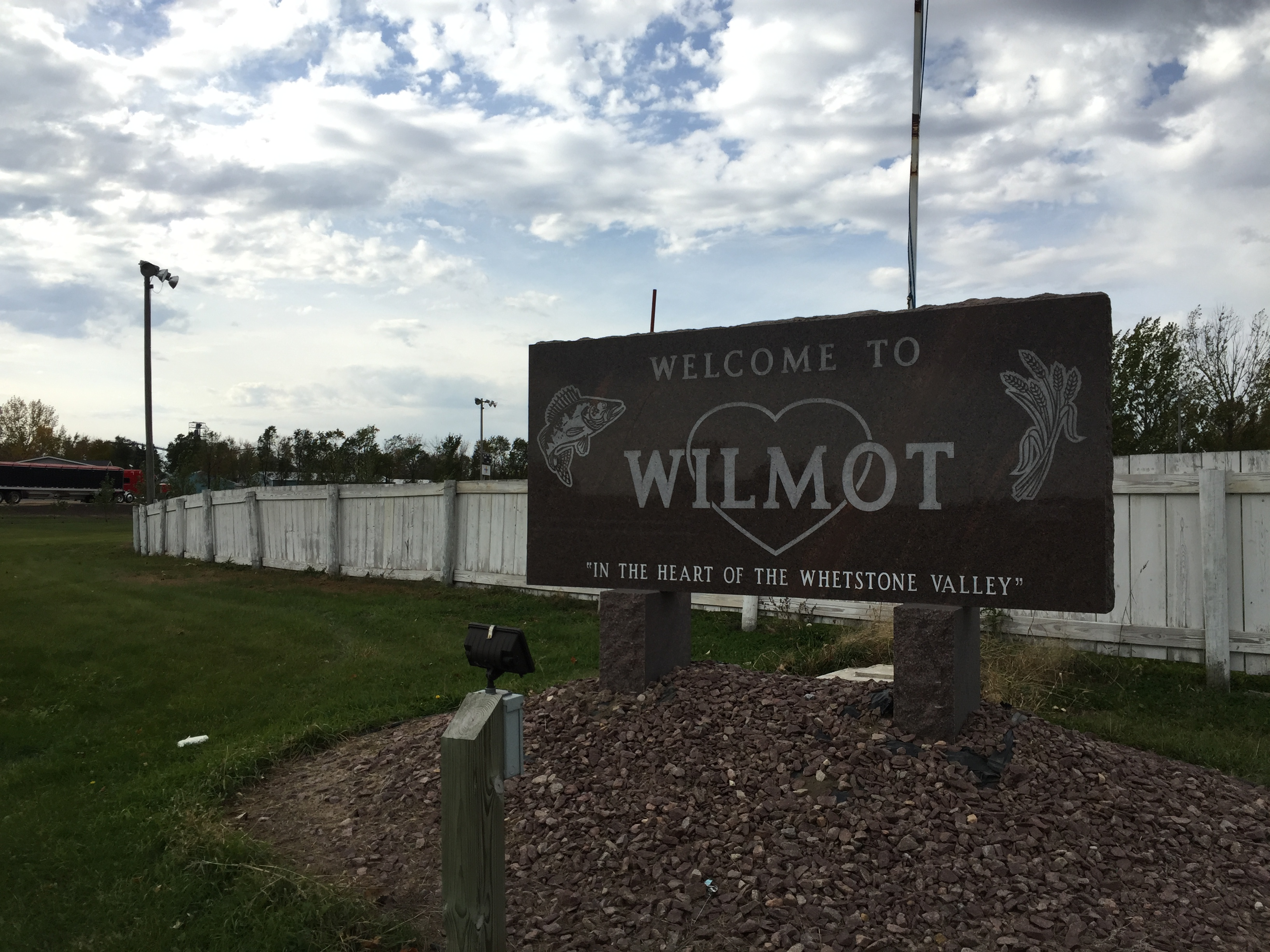
- The welcome sign for Wilmot, October 2014

- Location in Roberts County and the state of South Dakota
- Coordinates: 45°24′33″N 96°51′16″W
- Country: United States
- State: South Dakota
- County: Roberts
- Incorporated: 1891

Area
  - Total: 0.53 sq mi (1.38 km^{2})
  - Land: 0.53 sq mi (1.38 km^{2})
  - Water: 0 sq mi (0.00 km^{2})
- Elevation: 1,191 ft (363 m)

Population (2020)
  - Total: 432
  - Density: 810.5/sq mi (312.94/km^{2})
- Time zone: UTC-6 (Central (CST))
  - Summer (DST): UTC-5 (CDT)
- ZIP code: 57279
- Area code: 605
- FIPS code: 46-71980
- GNIS feature ID: 1267657
- Website: www.wilmotsouthdakota.com

Wilmot (Dakota: Otuŋwe Čistiŋna) is a city in Roberts County, South Dakota, United States. The population was 432 at the 2020 census.

== History ==
Wilmot, as well as Brookings, were named for Wilmot Brookings, who was provisional governor of the Dakota Territory.

== Description ==
The Wilmot School's mascot is The Wolves. Also formerly known as Grizzlies The local paper is the Wilmot Enterprise.

Wilmot's town and post office were organized in 1881 after a several years period of intense Norwegian homesteading in the area.

== Geography ==
According to the United States Census Bureau, the city has a total area of 0.49 square miles (1.27 km^{2}), all land.

=== Climate ===
Climate data for Wilmot, South Dakota (1991–2020)
Month	Jan	Feb	Mar	Apr	May	Jun	Jul	Aug	Sep	Oct	Nov	Dec	Year
Mean daily maximum °F (°C)	21.7 (−5.7)	25.7 (−3.5)	38.6 (3.7)	54.2 (12.3)	67.5 (19.7)	77.7 (25.4)	82.4 (28.0)	80.0 (26.7)	72.9 (22.7)	57.6 (14.2)	40.7 (4.8)	26.8 (−2.9)	53.8 (12.1)
Daily mean °F (°C)	12.2 (−11.0)	15.8 (−9.0)	28.8 (−1.8)	42.5 (5.8)	56.1 (13.4)	66.9 (19.4)	71.2 (21.8)	68.5 (20.3)	60.4 (15.8)	46.2 (7.9)	31.1 (−0.5)	18.5 (−7.5)	43.2 (6.2)
Mean daily minimum °F (°C)	2.6 (−16.3)	5.9 (−14.5)	19.0 (−7.2)	30.8 (−0.7)	44.7 (7.1)	56.1 (13.4)	60.0 (15.6)	57.1 (13.9)	47.9 (8.8)	34.9 (1.6)	21.6 (−5.8)	10.2 (−12.1)	32.6 (0.3)
Average precipitation inches (mm)	0.77 (20)	0.80 (20)	1.16 (29)	2.52 (64)	2.89 (73)	3.70 (94)	3.66 (93)	2.69 (68)	2.34 (59)	2.38 (60)	0.93 (24)	0.76 (19)	24.6 (623)
Average snowfall inches (cm)	10.6 (27)	10.6 (27)	7.7 (20)	6.1 (15)	0.0 (0.0)	0.0 (0.0)	0.0 (0.0)	0.0 (0.0)	0.0 (0.0)	1.4 (3.6)	5.7 (14)	8.9 (23)	51 (129.6)
Source: NOAA

== Demographics ==
Historical population
Census	Pop.	Note	%±
1900	352		—
1910	427		21.3%
1920	617		44.5%
1930	566		−8.3%
1940	628		11.0%
1950	590		−6.1%
1960	467		−20.8%
1970	518		10.9%
1980	507		−2.1%
1990	566		11.6%
2000	543		−4.1%
2010	492		−9.4%
2020	432		−12.2%
U.S. Decennial Census; 2018 Estimate

=== 2020 census ===
As of the 2020 census, Wilmot had a population of 432. The median age was 48.8 years. 19.2% of residents were under the age of 18 and 31.9% of residents were 65 years of age or older. For every 100 females there were 102.8 males, and for every 100 females age 18 and over there were 100.6 males age 18 and over.

0.0% of residents lived in urban areas, while 100.0% lived in rural areas.

There were 191 households in Wilmot, of which 24.6% had children under the age of 18 living in them. Of all households, 45.5% were married-couple households, 22.5% were households with a male householder and no spouse or partner present, and 25.7% were households with a female householder and no spouse or partner present. About 40.3% of all households were made up of individuals and 22.5% had someone living alone who was 65 years of age or older.

There were 221 housing units, of which 13.6% were vacant. The homeowner vacancy rate was 2.6% and the rental vacancy rate was 11.1%.

Racial composition as of the 2020 census
Race	Number	Percent
White	389	90.0%
Black or African American	0	0.0%
American Indian and Alaska Native	13	3.0%
Asian	0	0.0%
Native Hawaiian and Other Pacific Islander	0	0.0%
Some other race	3	0.7%
Two or more races	27	6.2%
Hispanic or Latino (of any race)	16	3.7%

=== 2010 census ===
As of the census of 2010, there were 492 people, 208 households, and 122 families living in the city. The population density was 1,004.1 inhabitants per square mile (387.7/km^{2}). There were 237 housing units at an average density of 483.7 per square mile (186.8/km^{2}). The racial makeup of the city was 89.4% White, 7.9% Native American, 0.4% from other races, and 2.2% from two or more races. Hispanic or Latino of any race were 1.4% of the population.

There were 208 households, of which 28.4% had children under the age of 18 living with them, 45.2% were married couples living together, 8.7% had a female householder with no husband present, 4.8% had a male householder with no wife present, and 41.3% were non-families. 37.5% of all households were made up of individuals, and 18.2% had someone living alone who was 65 years of age or older. The average household size was 2.22 and the average family size was 2.93.

The median age in the city was 45.4 years. 24.8% of residents were under the age of 18; 4.8% were between the ages of 18 and 24; 19.8% were from 25 to 44; 25.4% were from 45 to 64; and 25.2% were 65 years of age or older. The gender makeup of the city was 50.2% male and 49.8% female.

=== 2000 census ===
As of the census of 2000, there were 543 people, 231 households, and 133 families living in the city. The population density was 1,101.2 inhabitants per square mile (425.2/km^{2}). There were 252 housing units at an average density of 511.0 per square mile (197.3/km^{2}). The racial makeup of the city was 90.98% White, 7.00% Native American, 0.37% Asian, and 1.66% from two or more races. Hispanic or Latino of any race were 0.18% of the population.

There were 231 households, out of which 27.7% had children under the age of 18 living with them, 46.3% were married couples living together, 7.8% had a female householder with no husband present, and 42.4% were non-families. 40.7% of all households were made up of individuals, and 23.4% had someone living alone who was 65 years of age or older. The average household size was 2.24 and the average family size was 3.02.

In the city, the population was spread out, with 25.6% under the age of 18, 5.2% from 18 to 24, 20.4% from 25 to 44, 19.0% from 45 to 64, and 29.8% who were 65 years of age or older. The median age was 44 years. For every 100 females, there were 94.6 males. For every 100 females age 18 and over, there were 84.5 males.

The median income for a household in the city was $25,000, and the median income for a family was $29,750. Males had a median income of $22,125 versus $15,673 for females. The per capita income for the city was $13,561. About 13.6% of families and 16.7% of the population were below the poverty line, including 15.2% of those under age 18 and 22.9% of those age 65 or over.

== Transportation ==
Wilmot is served by two state highways:

- South Dakota Highway 15, which runs along the northern border of town
- South Dakota Highway 123, which runs through the western part of town to end at SD 15

== Notable people ==
- Royce Williams, ace Navy pilot during the Korean War

== See also ==
- List of cities in South Dakota
