= South Dakota Highway 25 =

State highway in South Dakota, United States

Highway 25

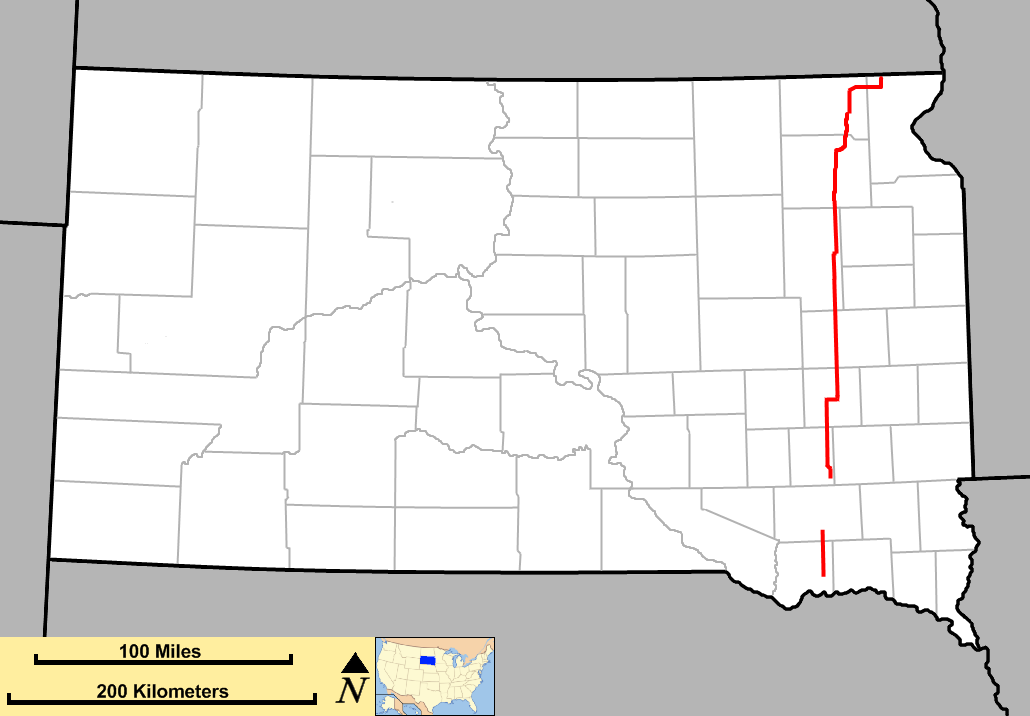
- Map of South Dakota with SD 25 in red

Route information
- Maintained by SDDOT
- Length: 194.524 mi (313.056 km)
- Existed: 1926–present

Southern segment
- Length: 19.529 mi (31.429 km)
- South end: SD 50 northwest of Tabor
- Major intersections: SD 46 south of Scotland
- North end: US 18 west of Olivet

Northern segment
- Length: 174.995 mi (281.627 km)
- South end: SD 262 northwest of Emery
- Major intersections: I-90 near Alexandria; US 14 in De Smet; US 212 west of Henry; SD 20 near Wallace; US 12 in Webster
- North end: ND 18 at the North Dakota state line north of Claire City

Location
- Country: United States
- State: South Dakota
- Counties: Bon Homme, Hutchinson, Hanson, Miner, Kingsbury, Clark, Day, Marshall, Roberts

Highway system
- South Dakota State Trunk Highway System; Interstate; US; State
← SD 24	→ SD 26

South Dakota Highway 25 (SD 25) is a 194.524-mile-long (313.056 km) state highway in the eastern part of the U.S. state of South Dakota. It connects Scotland, Howard, De Smet, and Webster.

It consists of two disconnected segments. Its shorter southern segment extends 19.529 miles (31.429 km) from SD 50 northwest of Tabor to U.S. Route 18 (US 18) west of Olivet. Its much-longer northern segment extends 174.995 miles (281.627 km) from SD 262 northwest of Emery, through Howard, De Smet, and Webster, to the North Dakota state line. Here, the roadway continues as North Dakota Highway 18 (ND 18).

SD 25's northern segment was established in 1926, with its southern terminus in Howard. From what is now SD 262, the SD 25 designated was applied to the road as construction occurred. Therefore, the northern terminus was at Farmer by 1971, Epiphany by 1977, and the Howard area by 1981. It was shifted west out of Howard in the early 1950s. Its northern path took a zigzag route northward. From De Smet, it went through Clark to Webster. It went west approximately 15 miles (24 km) and headed north to Britton. It then met the North Dakota state line northeast of Kidder. Part of this path is now SD 27. It was then shifted to its current path. In the mid-1970s, it utilized former SD 23 from Webster to Lake City. Between Hammer and the state line, it utilized part of SD 15's former path. The southern segment was the path of former SD 35. It was redesignated in 1976.

== Route description ==
=== Southern segment ===
==== Bon Homme County ====
SD 25 begins at an intersection with SD 50 northwest of Tabor, in the southeastern part of Bon Homme County. This intersection is also the northern terminus of County Road 1A (CR 1A; 424th Avenue). SD 25 travels to the north. Between CR 30 (304th Street) and 303rd Street, it passes just west of Kubal Lake. North of 298th Street is an intersection with SD 46. South of 294th Street, it crosses over some railroad tracks of BNSF Railway. North of 293rd Street, it crosses over Dawson Creek and enters the southeastern part of Scotland. Between Washington and Juniper streets, it passes Scotland School. An intersection with Main Street leads to the business district of the city, as well as the Landmann–Jungman Memorial Hospital. An intersection with CR 2 (Dollard Street), which is signed as a truck route, leads to Lake Henry. After the highway leaves Scotland, it intersects 291st Street, where it enters the south-central part of Hutchinson County.

==== Hutchinson County ====
SD 25 curves to the north-northeast. At an intersection with CR 38 (290th Street), it curves to the north-northwest. Just south of 287th Street, it curves to the north-northeast. Just north of this intersection, the highway crosses over South Branch Lonetree Creek. Almost immediately, it curves back to the north-northwest. It curves back to the north just before meeting the northern terminus of the southern segment, an intersection with U.S. Route 18 (US 18) and the southern terminus of CR 9 (424th Avenue).

=== Northern segment ===
==== Hanson County ====
SD 25 resumes at an intersection with SD 262 and the northern terminus of CR 9 (427th Avenue) at a point northwest of Emery, in the southeastern part of Hanson County. It travels to the north. Northeast of Welker Lake is an interchange with Interstate 90 (I-90). North of 255th Street is an intersection with SD 38. It travels just to the east of Farmer. At 252nd Street, it curves to the north-northwest. At the intersection with 250th Street, it begins to curve to the north-northeast. Just south of 249th Street, the highway begins to parallel Pierre Creek. Between CR 17 (247th Street) and 246th Street, the creek ends. North of 246th Street, it passes Lutz Lake. South of CR 24 (244th Street), which leads to Epiphany, it curves to the north-northwest. At this intersection, it enters the south-central part of Miner County.

==== Miner County ====
SD 25 curves back to the north almost immediately. Between 241st and 240th streets, it crosses over Rock Creek. Just north of 236th Street, it skirts along the eastern edge of the Burke Slough State Public Shooting Area. It travels just east of Roswell. It then intersects SD 34 (233rd Street). The two highways travel concurrently to the east, while the roadway continues to the north as 427th Avenue. Just west of 428th Avenue, the two highways cross over Rock Creek. Just east of this intersection, they curve to the east-southeast. East of 429th Avenue, they curve to the east-northeast. East of 430th Avenue, they enter the west-central part of Vilas. They curve back to the east and exit the east-central part of the town. Just west of Howard, the highways split, with SD 25 taking 433rd Avenue to the north. Just south of 231st Street, it passes Howard Municipal Airport to the west. At an intersection with CR 6 (224th Street), it crosses over the West Fork Vermillion River. North of 221st Street, it curves to the north-northwest. At an intersection with 220th Street, it enters the south-central part of Kingsbury County.

==== Kingsbury County ====
Almost immediately, SD 25 curves back to the north. North of CR 18 (208th Street), it enters the south-central part of De Smet. In the main part of the city, it intersects US 14 (Laura Ingalls Wilder Historic Highway). At this intersection, the highway curves to the north-northeast. An intersection with 3rd Street leads to Avera De Smet Memorial Hospital. It intersects 2nd Street, which is signed as a truck route. Immediately, it curves to the north-northwest and passes the De Smet Fire and Rescue. At an intersection with 1st Street, it curves back to the north. Just south of Chase Street, it crosses over some railroad tracks of Union Pacific Railroad. North of Charles Street, it leaves De Smet. Between CR 2 (204th Street) and 203rd Street, it passes the Wilder Landing Strip. North of 197th Street, it curves to the north-northwest and passes Cherry Lake to the west. At an intersection with 196th Street it enters the southeastern part of Clark County.

==== Clark County ====
Almost immediately, SD 25 curves back to the north. North of an intersection with the eastern terminus of CR 56 (195th Street), it intersects SD 28 and the eastern terminus of CR 38 (193rd Street). Here, SD 25 and SD 28 begin a concurrency to the north. At an intersection with the western terminus of CR 40 (190th Street), the two highways split, with SD 25 continuing to the north. Just south of 187th Street, it crosses over some railroad tracks of BNSF Railway. Between 184th and 183rd streets the highway travels through the central parts of Hamre State Public Shooting Area. Just south of 178th Street, it curves to the north-northwest. South of 177th Street, it curves to the north-northeast. Just south of 176th Street, it curves back to the north. North of 174th Street, it intersects US 212. The two highways travel concurrently to the east-southeast for approximately 4,500 feet (1,400 m). When they split, SD 25 resumes its northward direction. Just south of 169th Street, it travels through Mankey Slough. Just south of CR 21 (162nd Street), it curves to the north-northwest. It begins to skirt along the western edge of Carson Lake. This is just east of Lake Todd. The highway curves to the north-northeast and then back to the north. Between 160th and 159th streets, it passes the Faehn State Public Shooting Area. Then, it has an intersection with SD 20. Just south of 156th Street, it passes Heggs Lake. Between 156th and 154th streets, it passes Swan Lake. At 154th Street, it enters the south-central part of Day County.

==== Day County ====
SD 25 continues northward. North of 149th Street, it begins a curve to the northeast. South of 147th Street, it curves back to the north. Between 145th and 144th streets, it passes Webster Municipal Airport. North of 143rd Street, it enters the south-central part of Webster. Just north of South Western Avenue, it curves to the north-northwest. An intersection with 1st Avenue leads to the Day County Fairgrounds. At this intersection, the highway curves back to the north. Between 4th and 5th avenues, it crosses over some railroad tracks of BNSF Railway. Between 7th and 8th avenues, it passes a United States Post Office. 8th Avenue leads to Webster High School. Just north of 8th Avenue is the city hall. An intersection with the appropriately-named Hospital Drive and 14th Avenue leads to the Sanford Webster Medical Center. Almost immediately is an intersection with US 12. North of Park Lane, the highway leaves Webster. Just south of 138th Street, it curves to the northeast. Just northeast of this intersection, it curves back to the north. This is just west of South Waubay Lake. Between 132nd and 131st streets, it travels just east of Goose Lake. Between 131st and 130th streets, it travels just east of Lardy State Public Shooting Area and begins a curve to the east. After this curve, it enters the northwestern part of Roslyn. An intersection with the northern terminus of Main Street leads to the International Vinegar Museum. East of an intersection with 436th Avenue and the northern terminus of Third Street, it leaves Roslyn. Just east of 438th Avenue, it begins a curve back to the north. North of 128th Street, it curves to the north-northwest. North of 127th Street, SD 25 resumes its northward direction. North of 125th Street, it curves to the north-northeast. At an intersection with 124th Street, it enters the southeastern part of Marshall County.

==== Marshall County ====
SD 25 continues to the north-northeast. South of 122nd Street, it enters the far eastern part of Eden. An intersection with CR 16 (122nd Street) leads to Fort Sisseton State Park and South Buffalo Lakeside Use Area. A short distance later, it leaves Eden. North of 121st Street, it curves to the north-northwest and travels between the Stink Lakes. Just north of 119th Street, it curves back to the north. North of 118th Street, the highway curves to the north-northeast. This is southeast of Roy Lake. Just south of 117th Street, it curves to the north-northwest. An intersection with Northside Drive leads to Roy Lake State Park. The highway curves back to the north. Just southeast of Lake City, it has a brief concurrency with SD 10. They travel to the east-southeast. Immediately, they curve to the east-northeast. They curve back to the east-southeast and split. SD 25 resumes its northward direction. Between 115th Street and just north of 114th Street, it travels just west of Long Lake. Just south of 112th Street, it passes Dollar Lake to the west. Just north of this intersection, the highway passes the majority of Hoop Lake to the east. It then crosses over the eastern part of the lake. South of CR 8 (109th Street), it passes Flat Lake to the east. Between 108th and 106th streets, it travels through Hillhead. Just north of CR 6 (107th Street), it crosses over Shortfoot Creek. Just south of 106th Street, it curves to the east. Just west of 444th Avenue, it crosses over Shortfoot Creek again. East of 445th Avenue, it enters the west-central part of Veblen. Between Main Street and the northern terminus of Washington Avenue, it passes the city hall. East of Rosholt Street, the highway leaves Veblen. At an intersection with 449th Avenue, it enters the northwestern part of Roberts County.

==== Roberts County ====
SD 25 continues to the east. Just north of Claire City, it intersects the western terminus of SD 106. SD 25 turns left and heads to the north again, while 105th Street continues to the east. Almost immediately, it crosses over the Little Minnesota River. It continues northward until it meets its northern terminus, an intersection with 102nd Street SE at the North Dakota state line. Here, the roadway continues to the north as North Dakota Highway 18 (ND 18).

=== National Highway System ===
No part of SD 25 is included as part of the National Highway System, a system of routes determined to be the most important for the nation's economy, mobility and defense.

== History ==
SD 25 was established in 1926, with its southern terminus in Howard. It was then established from what is now SD 262, northwest of Emery, northward. The SD 25 designation was applied northward from this intersection as construction of the roadway was completed. The northern terminus of this segment was at Farmer by 1971, Epiphany by 1977, and the Howard area by 1981. Originally, SD 25 went through Howard, but was shifted west approximately 1 mile (1.6 km) in the early 1950s.

On the north end, SD 25 used a zigzag path north from De Smet; in 1927, it went through Clark to Webster, then west about 15 miles (24 km) before heading north to Britton and the North Dakota state line northeast of Kidder. The path north of US 12 is now SD 27. In the mid-1950s, the highway was shifted eastward to travel straight north from De Smet to US 212 9 miles (14 km) east of Clark. Then, after a 1-mile-long (1.6 km) jog to the east, it traveled north to Webster, and then resumed its previous alignment to North Dakota. In 1976, SD 25 was shifted eastward to use the path of former SD 23 from Webster to Lake City. It then curved northeast through Veblen and north again at Hammer (on the former path of SD 15).

The southern segment was the path of former SD 35. This was redesignated as part of SD 25 in 1976.

== Major intersections ==
County	Location	mi	km	Destinations	Notes
Bon Homme		0.000– 0.008	0.000– 0.013	SD 50 / CR 1A south – Tyndall, Yankton	Southern terminus of SD 25; northern terminus of County Road 1A
Bon Homme		8.861	14.260	SD 46 – SD 37, US 81	
Hutchinson		19.529	31.429	US 18 / CR 9 north – Tripp, Olivet	Northern terminus of southern segment; southern terminus of CR 9
Gap in route
Hanson		22.786	36.671	SD 262 / CR 9 south – Alexandria, Emery	Southern terminus of northern segment; northern terminus of CR 9; former US 16
Hanson		22.996– 23.252	37.008– 37.420	I-90 – Alexandria, Sioux Falls	I-90 exit 350
Hanson		32.558	52.397	SD 38 – Farmer, Spencer, Mitchell	
Miner		46.684	75.131	SD 34 west – Fedora	Southern end of SD 34 concurrency
Miner		50.674	81.552	SD 34 east – Howard	Northern end of SD 34 concurrency
Kingsbury	De Smet	72.620	116.871	US 14 (Laura Ingalls Wilder Historic Highway) – Huron, Arlington	
Clark		86.702	139.533	SD 28 east – Bryant, Lake Norden	Southern end of SD 28 concurrency
Clark		88.705	142.757	SD 28 west – Willow Lake	Northern end of SD 28 concurrency
Clark		103.748	166.966	US 212 west – Clark	Southern end of US 212 concurrency
Clark		106.498	171.392	US 212 east – Watertown	Northern end of US 212 concurrency
Clark		122.787	197.607	SD 20 – Bradley, Wallace	
Day	Webster	136.186	219.170	US 12 – Groton, Milbank	
Marshall		166.162	267.412	SD 10 west – Britton	Southern end of SD 10 concurrency; former SD 12 west
Marshall		172.171	277.082	SD 10 east – Sisseton	Northern end of SD 10 concurrency; former SD 12 east
Roberts		189.819	305.484	SD 106 east – SD 127	Western terminus of SD 106; former SD 15.
Roberts		194.524	313.056	ND 18 north – Lidgerwood	Northern terminus of SD 25; continuation into North Dakota
1.000 mi = 1.609 km; 1.000 km = 0.621 mi: Concurrency terminus

== See also ==
- List of state highways in South Dakota
