= Cottonwood Lake =

Cottonwood Lake may refer to:

- Cottonwood Lake, a lake in Hellyer County Park of San Jose, California
- Cottonwood Lake, a lake in Blue Earth County, Minnesota
- Cottonwood Lake, a lake in Cottonwood County, Minnesota
- Cottonwood Lake (Grant and Stevens counties, Minnesota)
- Cottonwood Lake, a lake in Lyon County, Minnesota
- Cottonwood Lake, a lake in Watonwan County, Minnesota
- Cottonwood Lake (Jefferson County, Montana), a lake in Jefferson County, Montana
- Cottonwood Lake (Park County, Montana), a lake in Park County, Montana
- Cottonwood Lake, a lake in Floyd Lamb Park at Tule Springs, Las Vegas, Nevada
- Cottonwood Lake (Clark County, South Dakota)
- Cottonwood Lake (Codington County, South Dakota)
- Cottonwood Lake (Jerauld County, South Dakota)
- Cottonwood Lake (Marshall County, South Dakota)
- Cottonwood Lake (Spink County, South Dakota)
- Cottonwood Lake (Sully County, South Dakota)
