= Platte Lake =

Platte Lake or Lake Platte may refer to:

- Platte Lake (Michigan), a lake in Benzie County, Michigan
- Platte Lake (Minnesota), a lake in Minnesota
- Lake Platte (South Dakota), a lake in Charles Mix County, South Dakota
- Platte Lake (South Dakota), a lake in Aurora County, South Dakota

== See also ==
- Platte Lake Township, Crow Wing County, Minnesota
