= 1944 South Dakota–Minnesota tornado outbreak =

Meteorological history
- Formed: June 17, 1944

Tornado outbreak
- Tornadoes: ≥6
- Max. rating: F5 tornado
- Duration: ≥1 day

Overall effects
- Fatalities: ≥ 13
- Injuries: ≥ 560
- Areas affected: Midwestern United States

The 1944 South Dakota–Minnesota tornado outbreak was a deadly tornado outbreak that occurred on June 17, 1944, in portions of northeastern South Dakota and western Minnesota. The outbreak is known for the Warner-Nahon-Bath Corner-Bath tornado, or just the Bath tornado, which was an F3 that hit the unincorporated community of Bath near Aberdeen, South Dakota, and the Wilmot-Hiawatha Beach-Yankeetown tornado (rated F5) that traveled through four counties from South Dakota into Minnesota. In total, 6 tornadoes were recorded to have touched down, although other less significant touchdowns may have came about. Fatality counts were at 13 people, with an estimated total count of 560 injuries during the outbreak, with most deaths occurring after the main event from debris and unsafe conditions or hazards.

== Confirmed tornadoes ==
Confirmed tornadoes by Fujita rating
FU	F0	F1	F2	F3	F4	F5	Total
?	0	0	3	1	1	1	≥ 6

F#	Location	County	State	Time (UTC)	Path length	Maximum width	Comments/Summary/Damage
F2	NW of Faulkton, SD.	Faulk County (SD)	South Dakota	21:30-?UTC	Touchdown	Unknown	Tornado was short-tracked and caused minimal damage in its narrow, small path. It destroyed a farmer's farm and other buildings beside the house 7 miles northeast of Faulkton.
F2	E of Wallace, SD.	Codington County (SD)	South Dakota	22:00-? UTC	Touchdown	Unknown	Tornado was also short-tracked, with semi-minimal damage recorded. Barns were destroyed, and a truck was thrown into Grass Lake near Wallace.
F2	SE of Webster to SE of Roslyn or W of Grenville, SD.	Day County (SD)	South Dakota	23:00-?UTC	15.2 miles (24.46 km)	Unknown	Tornado started southeast of Webster, and headed northeast to Waubay National Wildlife Refuge on Waubay Lake. It then went upwards west of Grenville where it eventually dissipated. One Webster farmer was thrown up to 40 yards into the air when the tornado hit, but only suffered some minor scratches at the most. Farms were either totaled or destroyed, and livestock were killed.
F3	NE of Warner up NE to Nahon and farther up to Bath Corner and Bath, SD.	Brown County (SD)	South Dakota	22:30-? UTC	15.2 miles (24.46 km)	300 yards (900 feet or 0.170 miles)	Tornado killed two, and injured another 12 people. Twenty homes were destroyed, with a brick school having its upper roof torn off. See text at the bottom for more information.
F4	NE of Henry to E Florence, SD.	Codington County (SD)	South Dakota	22:45-?UTC	14.4 miles (23.17 km)	300 yards (900 feet or 0.170 miles)	Tornado killed 3 and injured 25 people. It started two miles northeast of Henry and headed on a northeasterly path over Long Lake to the far eastern outskirts of Florence. The tornado was described as having a "snake-like" appearance when it crossed over Long Lake. It swept away and destroyed five farms southwest of Florence. More than 100 cattle were killed, and multiple homes experienced considerable damage and/or destruction.
F5	SE of Summit to N of Marvin and NE to Wilmot (SD). Then NE across to Yankeetown, and SE of Beardsley (MN).	Grant County, Roberts County (SD), and Big Stone County, Traverse County (MN)	South Dakota and Minnesota	23:15-? UTC	34.8 miles (56.00 km)	1500 yards (4500 feet to 0.852 miles)	Tornado killed 8, and injured 43 individuals. It was around 1500 yards, and traveled over 30 miles. See text below for more information.

== Selected tornadoes ==
Wilmot-Hiawatha Beach, South Dakota/Yankeetown-Beardsley, Minnesota
Meteorological history
- Formed: 5:15 PM CST

F5 tornado
- on the Fujita scale

Overall effects
- Fatalities: 8
- Injuries: 43
- Damage: > $500,000 (1944 USD)

=== Summit-Wilmot-Hiawatha Beach, South Dakota/Yankeetown-Beardsley, Minnesota ===
The largest, strongest, most destructive, and most violent tornado of the outbreak was the Wilmot-Hiawatha Beach-Yankeetown tornado of Grant, Roberts, Big Stone, and Traverse Counties in South Dakota and Minnesota. It began its semi-long tracked terror at 23:15 UTC or 5:15 p.m. CST, just north of 150th Street in Grant County, where it headed on a northeasterly path. It crossed 5 miles south of Summit, South Dakota, and preceded on its path to Wilmot, South Dakota. Wilmot's damage was described as being devastating, for damage southwest and south of Wilmot included no debris being left on the foundations of a previous home/s and farms. The tornado made its way up (still on a northeasterly path) over South Dakota Highway 15, and to the unincorporated community of Hiawatha Beach (north of Madsen Beach) on Big Stone Lake. Damage was not listed for Hiawatha Beach, although devastation was likely. It crossed Big Stone Lake into Minnesota, just south of the unincorporated community of Yankeetown. A church known as the Holden Lutheran Church was destroyed afterward as it was moving northeast with a mess of debris, and its old bell that was on the ground mostly in the same condition as it was beforehand up upon the church tower. A witness reported that the tornado blew her barn and other buildings away, but the cows inside were untouched and still standing in their regular positions. The tornado started to weaken and arrived just 3 miles south of Beardsley, Minnesota. Finally, the tornado dissipated in a farmer's small lake or pond 3 miles east of Beardsley. It had kept a complete northeasterly course the entire way, with no apparent loops or changes. Damage amounts are unknown but are estimated to be around $500,000 (1944 USD), with accounts generally unregarded besides in newspapers from after the event. It killed 8 and injured 43 others. Windspeeds were estimated to be between 261 and 318 mph (an average F5 speed). The tornado had a width of around 1,500 yards and traveled a total of 30 miles during its lifetime. Damage from the event could be referred to as EF-4 on the Enhanced Fujita Scale, for some damage is not strong enough for an EF-5 rating. Photos of the event were only present in a few newspapers during the time and are now preserved today.

=== Warner-Nahon-Bath Corner-Bath, South Dakota ===
Warner-Nahon-Bath Corner-Bath, South Dakota
Meteorological history
- Formed: 4:00 PM CST

F3 tornado
- on the Fujita scale

Overall effects
- Fatalities: 2
- Injuries: 12

The most well-known tornado of the outbreak was the Warner-Nahon-Bath Corner-Bath tornado of Brown County, South Dakota. It began at 22:30 UTC or around 4:00 p.m. CST, where it was located northeast of Warner. It then headed northeast to the unincorporated community of Nahon, where it barely missed it to the north. Minutes later, the tornado arrived in the unincorporated community of Bath Corner, and eventually Bath, where the tornado killed two and injured twelve people. A couple was fatally wounded in their home, and twenty other homes were completely destroyed. The roof of a home was entirely blown off, and the local community school was only partially damaged in the affected parts. It was the third deadliest tornado of the outbreak, but one of the most undocumented.

== Aftermath ==
The American Red Cross had set up stations in Watertown, South Dakota a few days after the tornado outbreak, with St. Louis personnel among them. Two million feet of lumber were set out and donated by the local War Production Board. Volunteer teams were created by the Red Cross for cleanup and debris removal, especially from farmer's fields. A newspaper stated, “It would be impossible to run harvesting machinery over them in their present conditions." Over $500,000 worth of damage was done, homes destroyed, and communities in shambles afterward, with many people who had lost their lives, and others injured.

== Obituaries ==
Survivors and witnesses who died years after the event had obituaries saying:

- "She remained scared of storms."
- "He lived through the big tornado of 1944.”
- "A memory never to be forgotten."

The outbreak was generally regarded as the scariest tornado outbreak in both eastern South Dakota history, and western Minnesota history.
