= School Lake =

School Lake may refer to:

- School Lake (Berrien County, Michigan)
- School Lake (Brown County, Minnesota)
- School Lake (Le Sueur County, Minnesota)
- School Lake, a lake in Madelia Township of Watonwan County, Minnesota
- School Lake, a lake in Odin Township of Watonwan County, Minnesota
- School Lake (South Dakota)
