= Badger Lake =

Badger Lake may refer to:

- Badger Lake (Alberta), a lake in Canada
- Badger Lake (Minnesota), a lake in Polk County, Minnesota

== See also ==
- Badger Lakes, a pair of lakes in Murray County, Minnesota
- Lake Badger, a lake in South Dakota
