= Dry Lake (disambiguation) =

A dry lake is an ephemeral lakebed.

Dry Lake may also refer to:

- Dry Lake (Churchill County, Nevada)
- Dry Lake (Esmeralda County, Nevada)
- Dry Lake (Codington County, South Dakota)
- Dry Lake (Hamlin County, South Dakota)
