= Buffalo Lake =

Buffalo Lake may refer to:

== Settlements ==
- Buffalo Lake, Minnesota, U.S.
- Buffalo Lake, Alberta, Canada

== Lakes ==
=== Canada ===
- Buffalo Lake (Alberta)
- Buffalo Lake (Northwest Territories)

=== United States ===
- Buffalo Lake (Murray County, Minnesota)
- Buffalo Lake (Waseca County, Minnesota)
- Buffalo Lake (Wright County, Minnesota)
- Buffalo Lakes (Glacier County, Montana)
- Buffalo Lake National Wildlife Refuge (North Dakota)
- Buffalo Lake (Minnehaha County, South Dakota)
- Buffalo Lakes, a lake chain in South Dakota
- Buffalo Lake National Wildlife Refuge, Randall County, Texas
- Buffalo Lake (Marquette County, Wisconsin)
- Lake Buffalo, in South Dakota

== Other uses ==
- Buffalo Lake (HBC vessel), a Hudson's Bay Company vessel

== See also ==
- Buffalo River (disambiguation)
