= Lone Tree Lake =

Lone Tree Lake may refer to:

- Lone Tree Lake (Ontario), a lake in Parry Sound District, Ontario
- Lone Tree Lake, a lake in Brown County, Minnesota
- Lone Tree Lake, a lake in Lyon County, Minnesota
- Lone Tree Lake, a lake in Yellow Medicine County, Minnesota
- Lone Tree Lake, a lake in Sheridan County, Montana
- Lone Tree Lake (Clark County, South Dakota)
- Lone Tree Lake (Deuel County, South Dakota)
