= Dogear =

Dogear may refer to:

- Dog ear, an informal term for folding the corner of a page to mark a location in a book, as opposed to using an actual bookmark
- Dog Ear Creek, a stream in South Dakota
- Dog Ear Lake, a lake in South Dakota
- Dog Ear Records, a record label
- dogear, social bookmarking software developed by IBM for use on corporate intranets
- Dog Ear, the NATO reporting name for the PPRU-1, a Soviet-designed, mobile early-warning radar
