= Todd Lake =

Todd Lake or Lake Todd may refer to:

- Lake Todd (Minnesota)
- Todd Lake (Oregon)
- Lake Todd (South Dakota)
