= Oak Lake =

Oak Lake may refer to:

- Oak Lake, Manitoba, a small town in Manitoba, Canada
- Oak Lake Beach, a community in Manitoba
- Oak Lake (Manitoba), a lake in Manitoba
- Oak Lake, Minnesota, United States, a former town
- Oak Lake, a lake in Carver County, Minnesota
- Oak Lake, a lake in Lincoln County, Minnesota
- Oak Lake (Polk County, Minnesota)
- Oak Lake (Nova Scotia), the name of various lakes in Nova Scotia
- Oak Lake (South Dakota)
- Oak Lake Indian Reserve, a reserve in Manitoba
