= Lake Lynn =

Lake Lynn or Lynn Lake may refer to:

- Lake Lynn, Pennsylvania
- Lake Lynn (Cabarrus County, North Carolina)
- Lake Lynn (Raleigh, North Carolina)
- Lynn Lake, Manitoba
- Lynn Lake (South Dakota)
- Cheat Lake, originally Lake Lynn, West Virginia

== See also ==
- Lyn-Lake, a street intersection in Minneapolis
