= Lake Iroquois =

Lake Iroquois can refer to:

- Lake Iroquois (South Dakota)
- Lake Iroquois (Vermont) in Vermont in the United States
- Lake Iroquois, Illinois in Iroquois County in Illinois in the United States
- Glacial Lake Iroquois, a prehistoric lake in the bed of present-day Lake Ontario in North America.
