= Deadman Lake =

Deadman Lake or Deadmans Lake may refer to:

- Deadman Lake (Alberta)
- Deadman Lake (Nova Scotia)
- Deadmans Lake (South Dakota)
- Deadman Lake (Utah)
