= Two Mile =

Two Mile or Twomile may refer to:

- Two miles, a historic running distance
- Two Mile, Queensland, Australia
- Twomile, West Virginia, U.S.
- Two Mile Village, Yukon, U.S.
- Twomile Lake, a lake in South Dakota, U.S.
