= Antelope Lake =

Antelope Lake may refer to:

- Antelope Lake (Clark County, South Dakota)
- Antelope Lake (Day County, South Dakota)
- Antelope Dam (California) (Plumas County, California)
- Antelope Lake (Saskatchewan), a lake in Saskatchewan, Canada

== See also ==
Antelope Dam (California)
