= Scotchman =

Scotchman may refer to:

- Scottish people
- Scotchman Lake, a lake in South Dakota
- Scotchman Peak, a mountain in Idaho, US
- Scotchman, a convenience store, see VPS Convenience
- Scotchman, from the days of horse-drawn carriages, somebody who worked on steep hills placing wedges, called scotches, under carriage wheels to stop them rolling away.

== See also ==
- Scotsman (disambiguation)
