= Anderson Lake (South Dakota) =

Lake in Day County, South Dakota, USA

- Location within South Dakota Location within the United States
- Location: Day County, South Dakota
- Coordinates: 45.278567°N 97.252895°W
- Type: Lake
- Surface elevation: 1,831 feet (558 m)

Anderson Lake is a lake in South Dakota, in the United States. It is located less than 1 mile (1 km) east of Bitter Lake, with its closest urban population center being located in Waubay, approximately 4 mi (6.5 km) northwest of the lake.

Anderson Lake has the name of Soren Anderson, who owned a farm near it.

== See also ==
- List of lakes in South Dakota
