= Reid Lake (South Dakota) =

Lake in South Dakota, United States

- Location within South Dakota
- Location: Clark County, South Dakota
- Coordinates: 45°01′36″N 97°44′00″W
- Basin countries: United States
- Surface elevation: 1,752 ft (534 m)

Reid Lake is a natural lake in South Dakota, in the United States.

Reid Lake has the name of James Reid, a pioneer who settled at the lake in the 1880s.

== See also ==
- List of lakes in South Dakota
