= Blue Dog =

Blue Dog may refer to:

- The Blue Dog Coalition, a group of moderate and conservative Democratic Party members of the United States House of Representatives
- Blue Dog Lake, a lake in South Dakota
- Blue Dog, a painting and a featured icon in various works by George Rodrigue
- Blue Dog Records was a London-based independent record label linked to the Barfly club
- The Blue Dog, one of the "blue" public houses and inns in Grantham
- The Blue Dogs (band), an American band formed in 1987

== See also ==
- Blue's Clues, a television show with a dog named Blue
- Blue, a general description for the color of some dogs' coats
