= Pickerel Lake (South Dakota) =

Lake in the state of South Dakota, United States

- Location within South Dakota Location within the United States
- Location: Day County, South Dakota
- Coordinates: 45.5167°N 97.2833°W
- Basin countries: United States
- Surface elevation: 1,850 ft (560 m)

Pickerel Lake is a 955-acre spring-fed lake located in Day County, South Dakota, United States. Pickerel Lake is part of the Glacial Lakes Region that encompasses much of Northeast South Dakota and stretches along the Coteau des Prairies hills. The area was formed thousands of years ago by glacial activity. Many of the depressions left behind were filled by melting glaciers. This area is also referred to as the Prairie Pothole Region. Pickerel Lake is one of the deepest natural lakes in South Dakota. The name originated from an American Indian name meaning "where you spear long fish." Excursion boats were common until the early 1900s. A fish hatchery was built in 1929 and abandoned in 1979, when a new facility was built at Blue Dog Lake.

== Recreation ==
Pickerel Lake boasts many water-based recreational activities such as boating and fishing. Pickerel Lake Recreation Area is a state park that has two campgrounds referred to as the East Unit and West Unit offering a total of 77 campsites and six cabins.

== See also ==
- List of South Dakota lakes
