= Lake Henry (Codington County, South Dakota) =

Lake in the state of South Dakota, United States

- Location within South Dakota Location within the United States
- Location: Codington County, South Dakota
- Coordinates: 44.8532859°N 97.4790912°W
- Type: lake
- Surface elevation: 1,775 feet (541 m)

Lake Henry is a natural lake in South Dakota, in the United States.

Lake Henry takes its name from Henry, South Dakota, which was named for J. E. Henry, an early settler.

== See also ==
- List of lakes in South Dakota
