= Lords Lake =

Lords Lake may refer to:

- Lords Lake (South Dakota), a lake
- Lords Lake National Wildlife Refuge, a protected area in North Dakota
