= Emma Lake =

Emma Lake or Lake Emma may refer to:

- Emma Lake, Saskatchewan, a community in Saskatchewan
- Emma Lake (Saskatchewan), a lake in Saskatchewan
- Lake Emma (South Dakota), a lake in North Dakota
- Lake Emma (New Zealand), a small lake in New Zealand

== See also ==
- Emma Lake Artists' Workshops
- Lake Emma Township, Hubbard County, Minnesota
