= List of lakes of South Dakota =

Lakes of South Dakota

This is a list of lakes in South Dakota. Swimming, fishing, and/or boating are permitted in some of these lakes, but not all.

Name	Area (acres)	(hectares)	Max. depth (ft)	(m)	County(ies)	Notes
Abraham Lake					Marshall	
America Lake	12	4.9			Brule	
Amsden Reservoir	235	95	27	8.2	Day	
Anderson Lake					Day	
Angostura Reservoir	4,612	1,866	70	21	Fall River	Cheyenne River reservoir behind Angostura Dam, see Angostura Recreation Area.
Antelope Lake					Clark	
Antelope Lake	1,200	485	25	7.6	Day	
Bear Butte Lake					Meade	Located near Bear Butte, a geological laccolith feature located near Sturgis. See Bear Butte State Park.
Beaver Lake	306	124	10	3.04	Minnehaha	
Beaver Lake	72	29	10	3.04	Yankton	
Belle Fourche Reservoir	8,063	3,263	55	16.7	Butte	At its 1911 completion by the United States Bureau of Reclamation, Belle Fourche Dam was the largest earthen dam in the world.
Big Stone Lake	12,610	5,103	16	4.8	Grant, Roberts	Shared with Minnesota. See Hartford Beach State Park.
Bitter Lake	9,900	4,010	24	7.3	Day	
Bitter Lake					Miner	
Blue Dog Lake	1,502	607	8	2.4	Day	
Brant Lake	1,307	529	14	4.2	Lake	
Brush Lake	386	156	unknown	unknown	Brookings	
Buffalo Lake					Minnehaha	
Buffalo Lakes					Marshall	
Bullhead Lake					Roberts	
Cady Lake					Jerauld	
Capitol Lake	5	2			Hughes	
Cattail-Kettle Lake	2,800	1,133	unknown	unknown	Marshall	
Cavour Lake	230	93			Beadle	
Chain of Lakes					Codington	
Cherry Lake					Clark, Kingsbury	
Clear Lake	600				Deuel	
Clear Lake					Hamlin	
Clear Lake	1,087	439	20	6.1	Marshall	
Clear Lake	472	191	11	3.35	Minnehaha	
Cold Brook	32	13	38	11.5	Fall River	Flood-control reservoir near Hot Springs.
Connors Lake					Beadle	
Cottonwood Lake					Clark	
Cottonwood Lake					Codington	
Cottonwood Lake					Jerauld	
Cottonwood Lake	350	141	12	3.6	Marshall	
Cottonwood Lake					Spink	
Cottonwood Lake					Sully	
Cottonwood Springs					Fall River	Flood-control reservoir near Hot Springs.
Covell Lake	15	6.1	9	2.7	Minnehaha	
Cresbard Lake	53	21	15	4.5	Faulk	
Crooked Lake					Grant	
Crystal Lake					Aurora	
Culver Lake					Deuel	Shared with Minnesota
Curlew Lake	136	55	22	6.7	Meade	
Deadmans Lake					Bennett	
Deerfield Reservoir			90	27.4	Pennington	Located within the Black Hills National Forest.
Diamond Lake	256	104	12	3.65	Minnehaha	
Dimock Lake	148	60	18	5.4	Hutchinson	
Dog Ear Lake					Tripp	
Dry Lake	2,455	993	15	4.5	Codington	
Dry Lake					Hamlin	
Dumarce Lake					Marshall	
Elm Lake					Brown	
East 81 Lake	484	196	unknown	unknown	Brookings	
East Oakwood Lake	928	375	9	2.7	Brookings	
East Vermillion Lake	512	208	23	7	McCook	Commonly known as Lake Vermillion
Elm Lake	1,209	489	34	10.3	Brown, McPherson	
Enemy Swim Lake	2,146	868	26	7.9	Day	
Eureka Lake	225	91	15	4.5	McPherson	
Fish Lake					Aurora	
Fish Lake					Deuel	
Flat Lake					Marshall	
Fourmile Lake					Marshall	
Fox Lake					Beadle	
Fox Lake					Deuel	
Gardner Lake	203	82	10	3.04	Harding	
Gilman Lake					Lake	
Goose Lake					Codington	
Grass Lake					Codington	
Grass Lake					Minnehaha	
Green Lake					Lake	
Greys Lake					Marshall	
Heggs Lake					Clark	
Herman Park Pond	5	2	9	2.7	Lake	
High Lake					Marshall	
Horse Thief Lake					Pennington	Within walking distance of Mount Rushmore, located in the Black Hills National Forest.
Jones Lake	100.5	40.7	7.5	2.3	Hand	
Kampeska Gravel Pits	30	12	21	6.4	Codington	
Kings Lake					Codington	
Lacreek Lake					Bennett	
Lake Albert					Grant	
Lake Albert	3,699	1,497			Kingsbury	
Lake Albert					Lincoln	
Lake Alice	1,116	451	12	3.6	Deuel	
Lake Alvin	105	42	26	7.9	Lincoln	Located within Lake Alvin Recreation Area.
Lake Andes					Charles Mix	See Lake Andes National Wildlife Refuge
Lake Badger					Kingsbury	
Lake Badus					Lake	
Lake Buffalo					Ziebach	
Lake Byron	1,805	730	10	3.04	Beadle	
Lake Campbell	1,000	400	7	2.1	Brookings, Moody	
Lake Carthage	203	82	24	7.3	Miner	
Lake Cochrane	355	144	28	8.53	Deuel	See Lake Cochrane Recreation Area
Lake Emma					Marshall, Roberts	
Lake Faulkton	115	46	20	6.1	Faulk	
Lake Francis					Deuel	
Lake Francis Case	102,000	41,000	140	42.6	multiple	Missouri River reservoir behind Fort Randall Dam
Lake Goldsmith	288	117	9	2.7	Brookings	
Lake Hanson	55	22	17	5.2	Hanson	
Lake Hendricks					Brookings	Shared with Minnesota
Lake Henry	165	66	35	11	Bon Homme	
Lake Henry					Codington	
Lake Henry	2,323	940	8	2.4	Kingsbury	
Lake Herman	1,287	521	13	3.9	Lake	See Lake Herman State Park.
Lake Iroquois					Kingsbury	
Lake Kampeska	5,250	2,120	16.4	5	Codington	
Lake Lakota	100	40			Lincoln	
Lake Lorraine	25	10			Minnehaha	In Sioux Falls
Lake Louise	163	66	25	7.6	Hand	See Lake Louise Recreation Area
Lake Madison					Day	
Lake Madison	2,642	1,069	16	4.8	Lake	
Lake Marsh					Hamlin	
Lake Martha					Marshall	
Lake Mary					Hamlin	
Lake Menno	47	19	34	10.3	Hutchinson	
Lake Minnewasta	601	243	14	4.2	Day	
Lake Mitchell	670	270	29	8.8	Davison	
Lake Nicholson					Codington	
Lake Nixon					Union	
Lake Norden	746	301	8	2.4	Hamlin	
Lake Oahe	312,000	126,000	205	62	multiple	Missouri River reservoir behind Oahe Dam; extends into North Dakota. By volume, it is the fourth-largest reservoir in the US.
Lake Oliver					Deuel	
Lake Platte					Charles Mix	
Lake Poinsett	7,886	3,191	22	6.7	Brookings, Hamlin	
Lake Preston					Kingsbury	
Lake Saint John					Hamlin	
Lake Sharpe	56,884	23,020	77	23.5	multiple	Missouri River reservoir behind Big Bend Dam
Lake Sinai					Brookings	
Lake Tetonkaha					Brookings	
Lake Thisted					Kingsbury	
Lake Thompson	20,000	8,090	34	10.3	Kingsbury	
Lake Todd					Clark	
Lake Traverse	11,200	4,500			Roberts	Shared with Minnesota
Lake Whitewood	4,677	1,893	7	2.1	Kingsbury	
Lake Winfred					Lake	
Lake Yankton	250	100	18	5.5	Yankton	Original river channel of the Missouri River prior to construction of Gavins Point Dam and Lewis and Clark Lake. Now a USACE Reservoir for fish and wildlife management. Shared with Nebraska.
Lakota Lake					Custer	
Leola Reservoir	23	9	12	3.6	McPherson	
Lewis and Clark Lake	31,400	13,000	45	13.7	Bon Homme, Yankton	Missouri River reservoir behind Gavins Point Dam. Shared with Nebraska.
Lone Tree Lake					Clark	
Lone Tree Lake					Deuel	
Long Lake					Codington	
Long Lake					Jerauld	
Long Lake					Lake	
Long Lake					Marshall	
Long Lake	400	161	10	3	McPherson	
Lords Lake					Brown	
Lost Lake	163	66			Minnehaha	
Lynn Lake	1,390	562	25	7.6	Day	
Marindahl Lake	106.81	43	30	9.1	Yankton	
McClarem Lake					Campbell	
McCook Lake	273	110	14	4.2	Union	
Medicine Lake					Codington	
Milwaukee Lake					Lake	
Mina Lake	806	326	27	8.2	Brown, Edmunds	
Minnewasta Lake					Day	
Mud Lake						Seventeen lakes in South Dakota have this name.
Mutske Lake					Campbell	
New Wall Lake	42	17	24	7.3	Pennington	
Newell City Pond	20	8	27	8.2	Butte	
Newell Lake	183	74	32	9.7	Butte	
Ninemile Lake					Marshall	
North Buffalo Lake	400	161	12	3.6	Marshall	
North Island Lake	375	151	17	5.1	McCook, Minnehaha	
Oak Lake	396	160	6	1.8	Brookings	
Opitz Lake	1,564	632	16	4.8	Day, Marshall	
Pactola Lake	800	323.7	162	49.4	Pennington	Largest lake in the Black Hills, constructed by the United States Bureau of Reclamation within the Black Hills National Forest.
Pelican Lake	2,796	1,132	8	2.4	Codington	
Pelican Lake					Lake	
Phantom Lake					Bennett	
Pickerel Lake	981	396	41	12.4	Day	
Piper Lake					Beadle	
Piyas Lake	1,500	607	13	3.9	Day, Marshall	
Platte Lake					Aurora	
Plum Lake					Kingsbury	
Punished Woman Lake	477	193	12	3.6	Codington	
Ravine Lake	72	29	14	4.2	Beadle	
Redfield Lake	170	68	12	3.6	Spink	
Red Iron Lake					Marshall	
Red Lake					Brule	A National Natural Landmark
Reid Lake	980	396	18	5.4	Clark	
Richmond Lake	829	335	29	8.8	Brown	
Round Lake	100	40	9	2.7	Clark	
Round Lake	1,040|			Deuel		
Round Lake					Lake	
Roy Lake	1,690	683	21	6.4	Marshall	
Rush Lake					Day	
Salt Lake					Brown	
Salt Lake					Campbell	
Salt Lake					Deuel	Shared with Minnesota
Scatterwood Lake					Faulk	
Schmitz Lake					Aurora	
School Lake					Deuel	
Scotchman Lake					Bennett	
Scott Lake					Aurora	
Scott Lake	107	43	11	3.3	Minnehaha	
Shadehill Reservoir	4,693	1,899	62	18.9	Perkins	
Sheridan Lake	383	155	29.5	9	Pennington	Located within the Black Hills National Forest.
Silver Lake	393	159	7	2.1	Hutchinson	
Silver Lake					Kingsbury	
Silver Lake					Miner	
Simpson Lake					Douglas	
Sixmile Lake	96	38	11	3.3	Marshall	
South Buffalo Lake	1,788	723	14	4.2	Marshall	
South Island Lake	91	36	16	4.8	McCook, Minnehaha	
South Red Iron Lake	600	242	14	4.2	Marshall	
Spirit Lake					Kingsbury	
Spring Lake					Kingsbury	
Staum Reservoir	46	19	16	4.8	Beadle	
Stockade Lake	120	48	15.8	4.8	Custer	Located within Custer State Park, in the Black Hills.
Summit Lake	174	70	13	3.9	Grant	
Swan Lake					Clark	
Swan Lake					Dewey	
Swan Lake	208	84	6	1.8	Turner	
Swan Lake					Walworth	
Sylvan Lake	17	7	12.1	3.9	Custer	Located within Custer State Park, in the Black Hills.
Twin Lake	1,235	499	14	4.2	Spink	
Twin Lakes	287	116	20	6.1	Minnehaha	
Twin Lakes	252	101	12.5	3.8	Sanborn	
Twomile Lake					Marshall	
Waggoner Lake	107	43.3	21	6.4	Haakon	
Wall Lake	207	84	24	7.3	Minnehaha	
Warner Lake					Codington	
Waubay Lake	15,540	6,290	31	9.4	Day	See Waubay National Wildlife Refuge.
West 81 Lake	1,590	643	unknown	unknown	Kingsbury	
West Oakwood Lake	1,200	485	10	3.04	Brookings	
White Lake					Aurora	
White Lake	187	75	20	6	Marshall	
Wigdale Lake					Deuel	
Willow Lake					Clark	
Wilmarth Lake	103	41	26	7.9	Aurora	

== See also ==
- List of rivers of South Dakota

== Sources ==
- Lake Surveys, Maps, and Fishing Forecasts
  - Northeast South Dakota fish surveys
  - Southeast South Dakota fish surveys
  - Western South Dakota fish surveys
- Great Lakes of South Dakota Association
- Maps of South Dakota Lakes
- SD State Parks and Recreation Areas
- MN DNR Lake facts
- MN DNR Lake finder
