= Lake Saint John =

Lake Saint John may refer to:

- Lake St. John (electoral district), a federal electoral district in Quebec, Canada
- Lake St. John (Louisiana), an oxbow lake in Louisiana near Ferriday and Lake Bruin
- Lake Saint John (South Dakota), a lake in Hamlin County, South Dakota
- Lac Saint-Jean, a large, shallow lake in Quebec, Canada
