= Oakwood Lakes State Park =

State park in South Dakota, United States

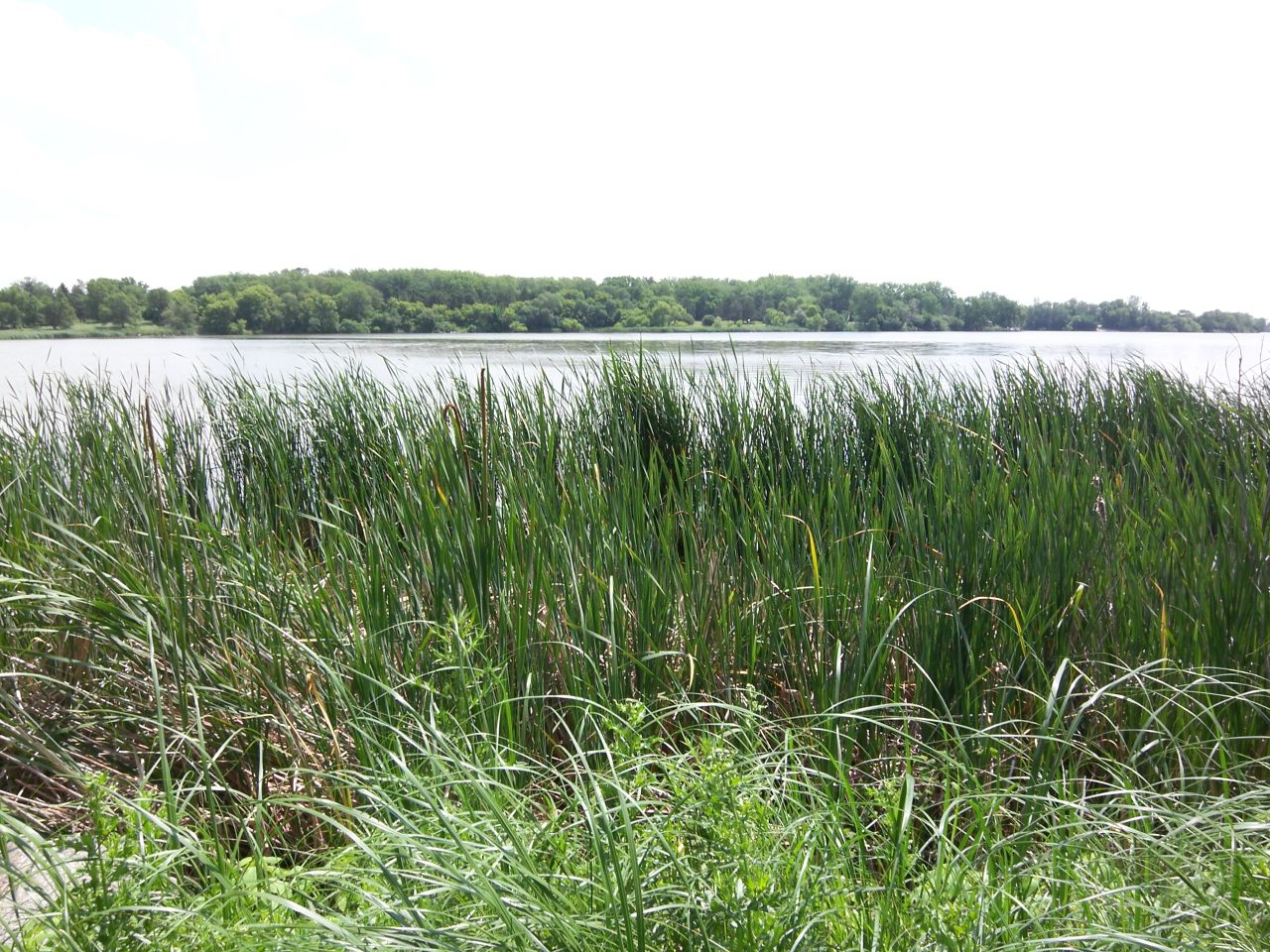

- Location within South Dakota
- Location: Brookings County, South Dakota, United States
- Coordinates: 44°26′59″N 96°58′55″W
- Established: 1945
- Administrator: South Dakota Department of Game, Fish and Parks
- Website: Official website

Oakwood Lakes State Park is a South Dakota state park in Brookings County, South Dakota in the United States. The park is open year-round for camping, swimming, fishing, hiking, and boating on Johnson Lake and Lake Tetonkaha as well as canoe and kayak rentals, horse camp sites and cross-country skiing.

== History ==
Oakwood Lakes was among three parks established in 1945 when the South Dakota Legislature created the statewide park system. The other two parks added to the system were Hartford Beach State Park and Lake Herman State Park. Prior to that, Custer State Park, which opened in 1919, was the only park managed by the state.
