= Fourmile Lake (South Dakota) =

Lake in the state of South Dakota, United States

- Location within South Dakota Location within the United States
- Location: Marshall County, South Dakota
- Coordinates: 45.7228376°N 97.4879312°W
- Type: lake
- Catchment area: 1 square kilometre (0.39 sq mi)
- Surface elevation: 1,798 feet (548 m)

Fourmile Lake is a lake in South Dakota, in the United States.

Fourmile Lake was named from its distance, four miles (6.4 km) from Fort Sisseton.

The lake contains a variety of fish including Northern Pike, Walleye, Yellow Bullhead and Yellow Perch.

== See also ==
- List of lakes in South Dakota
