= Sixmile Lake (South Dakota) =

Lake in the state of South Dakota, United States

- Location within South Dakota Location within the United States
- Location: Marshall County, South Dakota
- Coordinates: 45.7380598°N 97.4695271°W
- Type: lake
- Surface elevation: 1,801 feet (549 m)

Sixmile Lake is a lake in South Dakota, in the United States.

Sixmile Lake was named from its distance, six miles (9.7 km) from Fort Sisseton.

== See also ==
- List of lakes in South Dakota
