= Ninemile Lake =

Lake in the state of South Dakota, United States

- Location within South Dakota
- Location: Marshall County, South Dakota
- Coordinates: 45°45′57″N 97°27′54″W
- Type: lake
- Basin countries: United States
- Surface elevation: 1,824 ft (556 m)

Ninemile Lake is a lake in South Dakota, in the United States.

Ninemile Lake was named from its distance, nine miles (14 km) from Fort Sisseton.

== See also ==
- List of lakes in South Dakota
