= Wigdale Lake =

Lake in the state of South Dakota, United States

- C̣aƞ Núƞpa Bde (Dakota)
- Location within South Dakota
- Location: Deuel County, South Dakota
- Coordinates: 44°55′01″N 96°47′45″W
- Type: lake
- Basin countries: United States
- Surface elevation: 1,860 ft (567 m)

Wigdale Lake is a natural lake in South Dakota, in the United States.

Wigdale Lake has the name of Ole G. Wigdale, an early settler.

Joseph Nicollet reported that the lake and its vicinity was known in the Dakota language as C̣aƞ Núƞpa Bde, which can be translated as "Two Woods Lake". It was inhabited at the time of Nicollet's survey by a Sisseton band known as the Ṭi Záptaƞna, meaning "those who form only five lodges".

== See also ==
- List of lakes in South Dakota
