= Fox Lake (Beadle County, South Dakota) =

Lake in the state of South Dakota, United States

- Location within South Dakota Location within the United States
- Location: Beadle County, South Dakota
- Coordinates: 44.5323767°N 98.5655288°W
- Type: lake
- Surface elevation: 1,332 feet (406 m)

Fox Lake is a natural lake in South Dakota, in the United States.

Fox Lake has the name of John Fox, a pioneer settler.

== See also ==
- List of lakes in South Dakota
