= Minnewasta Lake =

Lake in the state of South Dakota, United States

- Location within South Dakota Location within the United States
- Coordinates: 45°23′28″N 97°22′07″W
- Type: lake
- Surface elevation: 1,801 feet (549 m)

Minnewasta Lake is a natural lake in Day County, South Dakota, in the United States. The lake found at the elevation of 1,801 feet (549 m). Minnewasta is a name derived from an Eastern Dakota language word mniwašte meaning "good water".

== See also ==
- List of lakes in South Dakota
