= Horse Thief Lake =

Lake in the state of South Dakota, United States

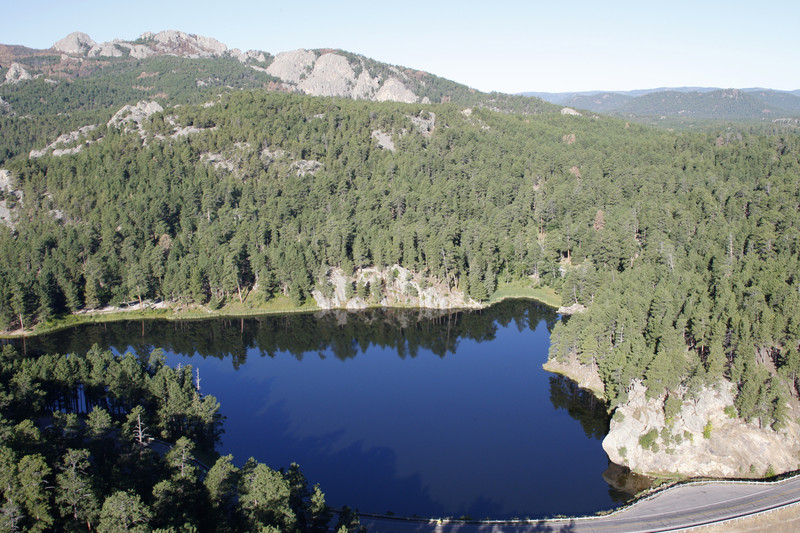

- Location within South Dakota Location within the United States
- Location: Custer County, South Dakota
- Coordinates: 43°53′39″N 103°28′47″W
- Basin countries: United States
- Surface elevation: 4,905 ft (1,495 m)

Horse Thief Lake is a lake in Pennington County, South Dakota. It is approximately two miles northwest of Mount Rushmore, the closest lake to the monument. The lake's name is derived from the fact a gang of horse thieves operated there.

== See also ==
- List of lakes in South Dakota
