= Beaver Lake (Yankton County, South Dakota) =

Lake in the state of South Dakota, United States

- Location within South Dakota Location within the United States
- Location: South Dakota
- Coordinates: 43°00′59″N 97°26′54″W
- Type: lake
- Basin countries: United States
- Surface elevation: 1,260 ft (384 m)

Beaver Lake is a lake in South Dakota, in the United States.

Beaver Lake was once teeming with beavers, hence the name.

== See also ==
- List of lakes in South Dakota
