= Long Lake (Jerauld County, South Dakota) =

Lake in the state of South Dakota, United States

- Location in South Dakota
- Location: Jerauld County, South Dakota, United States
- Coordinates: 44°09′57″N 98°43′01″W
- Type: Natural freshwater lake
- Basin countries: United States
- Surface elevation: 1,814 ft (553 m)

Long Lake is a natural lake in South Dakota, in the United States.

Long Lake was descriptively named on account of the lake's relative long outline.

== See also ==
- List of lakes in South Dakota
