= Crystal Lake (South Dakota) =

Lake in the state of South Dakota, United States

- Location within South Dakota Location within the United States
- Location: Aurora County, South Dakota
- Coordinates: 43.6441594°N 98.5694746°W
- Type: lake
- Surface elevation: 1,585 feet (483 m)

Crystal Lake is a lake in South Dakota, in the United States.

Crystal Lake was so named on account of its crystal-clear water.

== See also ==
- List of lakes in South Dakota
