= Long Lake (McPherson County, South Dakota) =

Lake in the state of South Dakota, United States

- Location in South Dakota
- Location: McPherson County, South Dakota
- Coordinates: 45°50′44″N 99°16′04″W
- Basin countries: United States
- Surface elevation: 1,916 ft (584 m)

Long Lake is a natural lake in South Dakota, in the United States.

Long Lake was so named on account of the lake's relatively long outline.

== See also ==
- List of lakes in South Dakota
