= Clear Lake (Minnehaha County, South Dakota) =

Lake in the state of South Dakota, United States

- Location within South Dakota Location within the United States
- Location: Minnehaha County, South Dakota
- Coordinates: 43°45′41″N 97°00′44″W
- Type: lake
- Surface elevation: 1,611 feet (491 m)

Clear Lake is a lake in Minnehaha County, South Dakota, in the United States.

Clear Lake was descriptively named on account of its clear water.

== See also ==
- List of lakes in South Dakota
