= Bitter Lake (Miner County, South Dakota) =

Lake in the state of South Dakota, United States

- Location within South Dakota Location within the United States
- Location: Miner County, South Dakota
- Coordinates: 43.9152270°N 97.7117073°W
- Type: lake
- Surface elevation: 1,362 feet (415 m)

Bitter Lake is a lake in South Dakota, in the United States.

Bitter Lake contains unpleasant tasting lake water, hence the name.

== See also ==
- List of lakes in South Dakota
