= Chain of Lakes (South Dakota) =

Group of lakes in South Dakota, United States

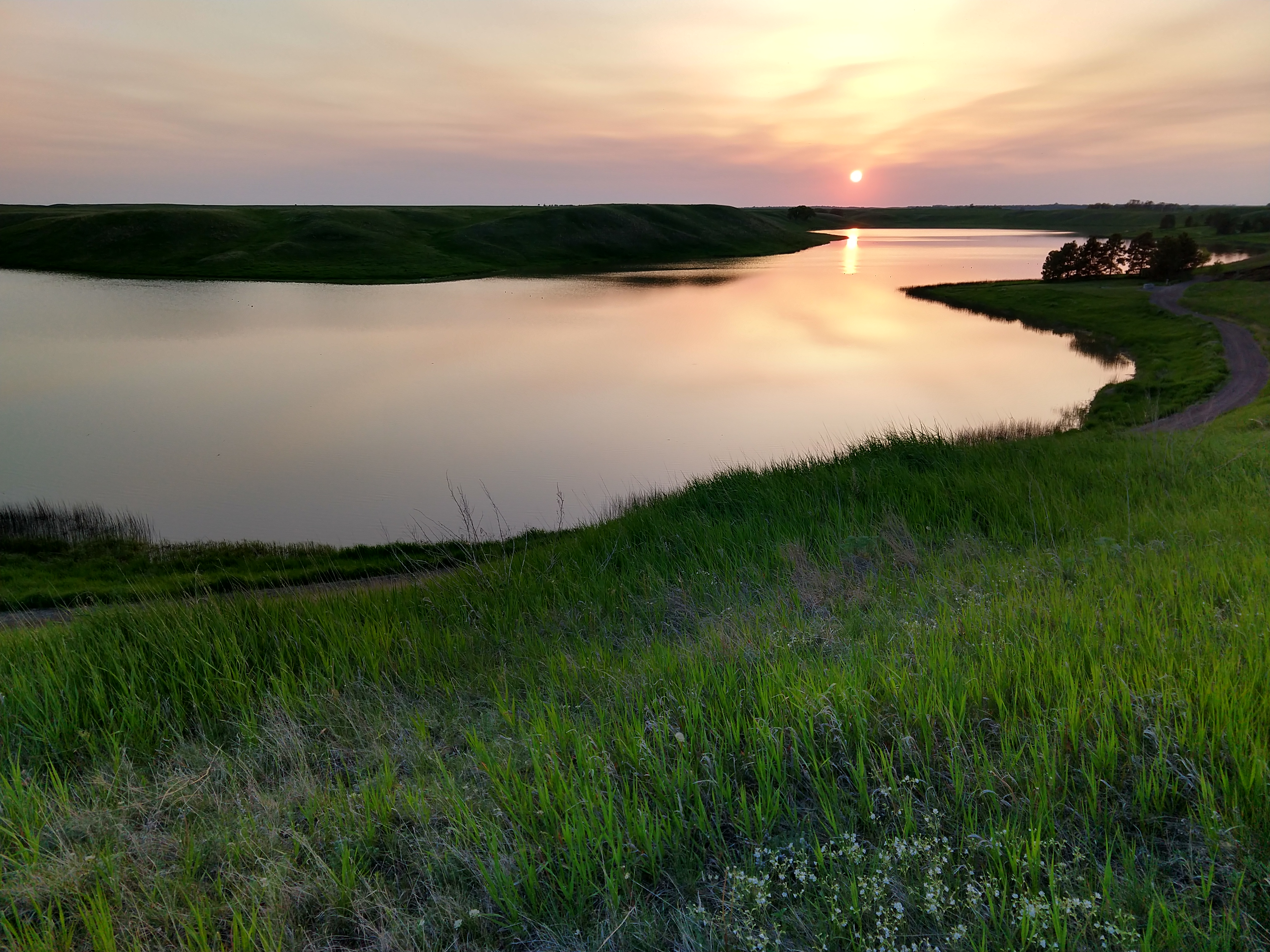

- Location within South Dakota Location within the United States
- Location: Codington County, South Dakota
- Coordinates: 44.9825360°N 97.2713448°W
- Type: lake
- Surface elevation: 1,736 feet (529 m)

Chain of Lakes is a group of lakes in South Dakota, in the United States.

The group of lakes is classified as a lake chain, hence the name.

== See also ==
- List of lakes in South Dakota
