= Brush Lake (South Dakota) =

Lake in the state of South Dakota, United States

- Location within South Dakota Location within the United States
- Location: Brookings County, South Dakota
- Coordinates: 44°19′29″N 97°06′56″W
- Type: lake
- Basin countries: United States
- Surface elevation: 1,765 ft (538 m)

Brush Lake is a lake in Brookings County, South Dakota, in the United States.

Brush Lake originally was lined with brush, hence the name.

== See also ==
- List of lakes in South Dakota
