= Warner Lake =

Lake in the state of South Dakota, United States

- Location within South Dakota
- Location: Codington County, South Dakota
- Coordinates: 45°00′30″N 97°29′08″W
- Type: lake
- Basin countries: United States
- Surface elevation: 1,788 ft (545 m)

Warner Lake is a natural lake in South Dakota, in the United States.

Warner Lake bears the name of a pioneer settler.

== See also ==
- List of lakes in South Dakota
