= Lake Winfred =

Lake in the state of South Dakota, United States

- Location within South Dakota
- Location: Lake County, South Dakota
- Coordinates: 44°00′03″N 97°21′33″W
- Type: lake
- Basin countries: United States
- Surface elevation: 1,696 ft (517 m)

Lake Winfred is a natural lake in South Dakota, in the United States.

Lake Winfred has the name of the daughter of a pioneer settler.

== See also ==
- List of lakes in South Dakota
