= Green Lake (South Dakota) =

Lake in the state of South Dakota, United States

- Location within South Dakota Location within the United States
- Location: Lake County, South Dakota
- Coordinates: 44.1206128°N 96.9424855°W
- Type: lake
- Surface elevation: 1,614 feet (492 m)

Green Lake is a natural lake in South Dakota, in the United States.

Green Lake was named on account of the green plants with it.

== See also ==
- List of lakes in South Dakota
