= Lake Nicholson =

Lake in the state of South Dakota, United States

- Location within South Dakota Location within the United States
- Location: Codington County, South Dakota
- Coordinates: 45.0204359°N 97.3746957°W
- Type: lake
- Surface elevation: 1,716 feet (523 m)

Lake Nicholson is a natural lake in South Dakota, in the United States.

Lake Nicholson has the name of John Nicholson, a pioneer who settled there.

== See also ==
- List of lakes in South Dakota
