= Fish Lake (Deuel County, South Dakota) =

Lake in the state of South Dakota, United States

- Location within South Dakota Location within the United States
- Location: Deuel County, South Dakota
- Coordinates: 44.6015756°N 96.4773397°W
- Type: lake
- Surface elevation: 1,752 feet (534 m)

Fish Lake is a natural lake in South Dakota, in the United States.

Fish Lake is a habitat of freshwater fish, hence the name.

== See also ==
- List of lakes in South Dakota
