= Beaver Lake (Minnehaha County, South Dakota) =

Lake in the state of South Dakota, United States

- Location within South Dakota Location within the United States
- Location: South Dakota
- Coordinates: 43°38′09″N 97°03′05″W
- Type: lake
- Surface elevation: 1,650 feet (500 m)

Beaver Lake is a lake in South Dakota, in the United States.

Beaver Lake was once a natural habitat of the North American beaver, hence the name.

== See also ==
- List of lakes in South Dakota
