= Round Lake (Deuel County, South Dakota) =

Lake in the state of South Dakota, United States

- Location within South Dakota Location within the United States
- Location: Deuel County, South Dakota
- Coordinates: 44°57′52″N 96°49′38″W
- Type: lake
- Surface elevation: 1,857 feet (566 m)

Round Lake is a natural lake in Deuel County, South Dakota, in the United States. It is found at an elevation of 1,857 feet (566 m).

Round Lake received its name on account of its round outline.

== See also ==
- List of lakes in South Dakota
