= Lake Francis (South Dakota) =

Lake in the state of South Dakota, United States

- Location within South Dakota Location within the United States
- Location: Deuel County, South Dakota
- Coordinates: 44.8209518°N 96.5336928°W
- Type: lake
- Surface elevation: 1,650 feet (500 m)

Lake Francis is a natural lake in South Dakota, in the United States.

Lake Francis was named for the child of a first settler.

== See also ==
- List of lakes in South Dakota
