= Lake Alice (South Dakota) =

Lake in the state of South Dakota, United States

- Location within South Dakota Location within the United States
- Location: Deuel County, South Dakota
- Coordinates: 44.8779156°N 96.6338965°W
- Type: lake
- Surface elevation: 1,693 feet (516 m)

Lake Alice is a lake in South Dakota, in the United States.

Lake Alice has the name of Alice Mosher, the daughter of a railroad official.

== See also ==
- List of lakes in South Dakota
