= Long Lake (Codington County, South Dakota) =

Lake in Codington County, South Dakota, USA

- Location in South Dakota
- Location: Codington County, South Dakota, United States
- Coordinates: 44°56′06″N 97°23′59″W
- Basin countries: United States
- Surface elevation: 1,719 ft (524 m)

Long Lake is a natural lake in Codington County, South Dakota, in the United States. It is located 3 miles (4.8 km) north and 3 miles (4.8 km) east of the town of Henry. It is managed as a fishery for walleye and yellow perch.

Long Lake was descriptively named on account of the lake's long outline.

== See also ==
- List of lakes in South Dakota
