= Pelican Lake (Lake County, South Dakota) =

Lake in the state of South Dakota, United States

- Location within South Dakota Location within the United States
- Location: Lake County, South Dakota
- Coordinates: 44°05′33″N 96°54′49″W
- Type: lake
- Basin countries: United States
- Surface elevation: 1,634 ft (498 m)

Pelican Lake is a natural lake in South Dakota, in the United States. The north-east shore is part of Watertown, South Dakota.

Pelican Lake was once a habitat of the pelican, hence the name. The lake remains a popular stopping point for migrating waterfowl, with geese and ducks using the open water of the lake as a resting area each fall.

== See also ==
- List of lakes in South Dakota
