= Grass Lake (Minnehaha County, South Dakota) =

Lake in the state of South Dakota, United States

- Location within South Dakota Location within the United States
- Location: Minnehaha County, South Dakota
- Coordinates: 43.5894972°N 97.0391571°W
- Type: lake
- Surface elevation: 1,572 feet (479 m)

Grass Lake is a natural lake in South Dakota, in the United States.

Grass Lake received its name from the abundance of marsh grass within it.

== See also ==
- List of lakes in South Dakota
