= Willow Lake, South Dakota =

- City
- Location in Clark County and the state of South Dakota
- Coordinates: 44°37′40″N 97°38′19″W
- Country: United States
- State: South Dakota
- County: Clark
- Incorporated: 1910

Area
  - Total: 0.38 sq mi (0.98 km^{2})
  - Land: 0.37 sq mi (0.96 km^{2})
  - Water: 0.0039 sq mi (0.01 km^{2})
- Elevation: 1,778 ft (542 m)

Population (2020)
  - Total: 255
  - Density: 685/sq mi (264.4/km^{2})
- Time zone: UTC-6 (Central (CST))
  - Summer (DST): UTC-5 (CDT)
- ZIP code: 57278
- Area code: 605
- FIPS code: 46-71940
- GNIS feature ID: 1267656

Willow Lake is a city in Clark County, South Dakota, United States. The population was 255 at the 2020 census.

The city took its name from Willow Lake, a natural lake near the town site.

== Geography ==
According to the United States Census Bureau, the city has a total area of 0.37 square miles (0.96 km^{2}), all land.

== Demographics ==
Historical population
Census	Pop.	Note	%±
1890	240		—
1900	210		−12.5%
1910	437		108.1%
1920	477		9.2%
1930	514		7.8%
1940	427		−16.9%
1950	484		13.3%
1960	467		−3.5%
1970	353		−24.4%
1980	375		6.2%
1990	317		−15.5%
2000	294		−7.3%
2010	263		−10.5%
2020	255		−3.0%
U.S. Decennial Census

=== 2020 census ===
As of the 2020 census, Willow Lake had a population of 255. The median age was 33.9 years. 32.5% of residents were under the age of 18 and 18.0% of residents were 65 years of age or older. For every 100 females there were 90.3 males, and for every 100 females age 18 and over there were 100.0 males age 18 and over.

0.0% of residents lived in urban areas, while 100.0% lived in rural areas.

There were 102 households in Willow Lake, of which 21.6% had children under the age of 18 living in them. Of all households, 51.0% were married-couple households, 23.5% were households with a male householder and no spouse or partner present, and 23.5% were households with a female householder and no spouse or partner present. About 44.1% of all households were made up of individuals and 18.6% had someone living alone who was 65 years of age or older.

There were 127 housing units, of which 19.7% were vacant. The homeowner vacancy rate was 0.0% and the rental vacancy rate was 3.6%.

Racial composition as of the 2020 census
Race	Number	Percent
White	244	95.7%
Black or African American	0	0.0%
American Indian and Alaska Native	2	0.8%
Asian	0	0.0%
Native Hawaiian and Other Pacific Islander	0	0.0%
Some other race	7	2.7%
Two or more races	2	0.8%
Hispanic or Latino (of any race)	18	7.1%

=== 2010 census ===
As of the census of 2010, there were 263 people, 115 households, and 68 families residing in the city. The population density was 710.8 inhabitants per square mile (274.4/km^{2}). There were 129 housing units at an average density of 348.6 per square mile (134.6/km^{2}). The racial makeup of the city was 92.0% White, 7.2% from other races, and 0.8% from two or more races. Hispanic or Latino of any race were 8.0% of the population.

There were 115 households, of which 27.0% had children under the age of 18 living with them, 44.3% were married couples living together, 9.6% had a female householder with no husband present, 5.2% had a male householder with no wife present, and 40.9% were non-families. 37.4% of all households were made up of individuals, and 23.5% had someone living alone who was 65 years of age or older. The average household size was 2.29 and the average family size was 3.03.

The median age in the city was 42.2 years. 26.2% of residents were under the age of 18; 11.9% were between the ages of 18 and 24; 14.4% were from 25 to 44; 28.9% were from 45 to 64; and 18.6% were 65 years of age or older. The gender makeup of the city was 50.6% male and 49.4% female.

=== 2000 census ===
As of the census of 2000, there were 294 people, 126 households, and 75 families residing in the city. The population density was 793.7 inhabitants per square mile (306.4/km^{2}). There were 148 housing units at an average density of 399.6 per square mile (154.3/km^{2}). The racial makeup of the city was 93.88% White, 5.10% Native American, and 1.02% from two or more races.

There were 126 households, out of which 28.6% had children under the age of 18 living with them, 50.0% were married couples living together, 7.1% had a female householder with no husband present, and 39.7% were non-families. 37.3% of all households were made up of individuals, and 23.0% had someone living alone who was 65 years of age or older. The average household size was 2.33 and the average family size was 3.11.

In the city, the population was spread out, with 31.3% under the age of 18, 3.4% from 18 to 24, 21.1% from 25 to 44, 22.4% from 45 to 64, and 21.8% who were 65 years of age or older. The median age was 38 years. For every 100 females, there were 94.7 males. For every 100 females age 18 and over, there were 88.8 males.

The median income for a household in the city was $30,625, and the median income for a family was $34,750. Males had a median income of $25,250 versus $20,833 for females. The per capita income for the city was $13,585. About 13.6% of families and 20.1% of the population were below the poverty line, including 29.3% of those under the age of eighteen and 20.3% of those 65 or over.

== Notable people ==
- Art Fryslie, farmer and politician
- Clarence Gonstead, chiropractor, was born in Willow Lake
