= Kings Lake (South Dakota) =

Lake in the state of South Dakota, United States

- Location within South Dakota Location within the United States
- Location: Codington County, South Dakota
- Coordinates: 45.0738350°N 97.4459571°W
- Type: lake
- Surface elevation: 1,745 feet (532 m)

Kings Lake is a natural lake in South Dakota, in the United States.

Kings Lake has the name of John King, a pioneer who settled there.

== See also ==
- List of lakes in South Dakota
