= Dumarce Lake =

Lake in the state of South Dakota, United States

- Location within South Dakota
- Location: Marshall County, South Dakota
- Coordinates: 45°45′56″N 97°21′49″W
- Type: lake
- Basin countries: United States
- Surface elevation: 1,886 ft (575 m)

Dumarce Lake is a natural lake in South Dakota, in the United States.

Dumarce Lake has the name of a local Native American family.

== See also ==
- List of lakes in South Dakota
