= Schmitz Lake =

Lake in the state of South Dakota, United States

- Location within South Dakota
- Location: Aurora County, South Dakota
- Coordinates: 43°43′57″N 98°37′55″W
- Type: lake
- Basin countries: United States
- Surface elevation: 1,598 ft (487 m)

Schmitz Lake is a natural lake in South Dakota, in the United States.

Schmitz Lake has the name of August Schmitz, a pioneer settler.

== See also ==
- List of lakes in South Dakota
