= Fox Lake (Deuel County, South Dakota) =

Lake in the state of South Dakota, United States

- Location within South Dakota Location within the United States
- Location: Deuel County, South Dakota
- Coordinates: 44.6555536°N 96.5234573°W
- Type: lake
- Surface elevation: 1,772 feet (540 m)

Fox Lake is a natural lake in South Dakota, in the United States.

Fox Lake was so named on account of the area being a favorite trapping ground of foxes.

== See also ==
- List of lakes in South Dakota
