= Bullhead Lake (Roberts County, South Dakota) =

Lake in the state of South Dakota, United States

- Location within South Dakota Location within the United States
- Location: Roberts County, South Dakota
- Coordinates: 45.4309208°N 96.7715968°W
- Type: natural freshwater lake
- Basin countries: United States
- Max. length: 1.39 miles (2.24 km)
- Max. width: 0.8 miles (1.3 km)
- Surface elevation: 1,135 feet (346 m)

Bullhead Lake is a lake in South Dakota, in the United States.

Bullhead Lake was a natural habitat for bullhead fish, hence the name.

== See also ==
- List of lakes in South Dakota
