= Lake Martha (South Dakota) =

Lake in the state of South Dakota, United States

- Location within South Dakota Location within the United States
- Location: Marshall County, South Dakota
- Coordinates: 45.6114885°N 97.2335017°W
- Type: lake
- Surface elevation: 1,860 feet (570 m)

Lake Martha is a natural lake in South Dakota, in the United States.

According to the Federal Writers' Project, the origin of the name is obscure.

== See also ==
- List of lakes in South Dakota
