= Clear Lake (Hamlin County, South Dakota) =

Lake in the state of South Dakota, United States

- Location within South Dakota Location within the United States
- Location: Hamlin County, South Dakota
- Coordinates: 44.7668323°N 97.1762718°W
- Type: lake
- Surface elevation: 1,693 feet (516 m)

Clear Lake is a lake in South Dakota, in the United States.

Clear Lake was descriptively named for its clear water.

== See also ==
- List of lakes in South Dakota
