= Cady Lake =

Lake in the state of South Dakota, United States

- Location within South Dakota
- Location: Jerauld County, South Dakota
- Coordinates: 44°00′26″N 98°36′41″W
- Type: lake
- Basin countries: United States
- Surface elevation: 1,857 ft (566 m)

Cady Lake is a lake in South Dakota, in the United States.

Cady Lake has the name of A. D. Cady, a pioneer who settled there.

== See also ==
- List of lakes in South Dakota
