= Phantom Lake (South Dakota) =

Lake in the state of South Dakota, United States

Rush Lake
- Location within South Dakota
- Location: Bennett County, South Dakota
- Coordinates: 43°01′31″N 101°30′38″W
- Type: lake
- Basin countries: United States
- Surface elevation: 3,225 ft (983 m)

Phantom Lake is a natural lake in South Dakota, in the United States.

Phantom Lake was named for the phenomenon in which the lake vanishes from sight when seen from different angles.

== See also ==
- List of lakes in South Dakota
