= Elm Lake =

Lake in the state of South Dakota, United States

- Location within South Dakota
- Location: Brown County, South Dakota
- Coordinates: 45°51′17″N 98°42′35″W
- Type: lake
- Basin countries: United States
- Surface elevation: 1,460 ft (445 m)

Elm Lake is a lake in South Dakota, in the United States.

Elm River takes its name from the nearby Elm River.

== See also ==
- List of lakes in South Dakota
