= Long Lake (Marshall County, South Dakota) =

Lake in the state of South Dakota, United States

- Location in South Dakota
- Location: Marshall County, South Dakota
- Coordinates: 45°43′41″N 97°22′46″W
- Basin countries: United States
- Surface elevation: 1,847 ft (563 m)

Long Lake is a natural lake in South Dakota, in the United States. It is located in the Lake Traverse Indian Reservation, east of Lake City.

Long Lake was descriptively named on account of the lake's relatively long outline.

A Native American story states that a Santee man named Gray Foot told his sons on his deathbed that he had buried gold at Long Lake, but it has never been discovered.

== See also ==
- List of lakes in South Dakota
