= Lake Oliver (South Dakota) =

Lake in the state of South Dakota, United States

- Location within South Dakota Location within the United States
- Location: Deuel County, South Dakota
- Coordinates: 44.7193642°N 96.4744673°W
- Type: lake
- Surface elevation: 1,680 feet (510 m)

Lake Oliver is a natural lake in South Dakota, in the United States.

Lake Oliver has the name of Henry Oliver, an early landholder.

== See also ==
- List of lakes in South Dakota
