= Scatterwood Lake =

Lake in the state of South Dakota, United States

- Location within South Dakota
- Location: Faulk County, South Dakota
- Coordinates: 45°11′59″N 98°45′11″W
- Type: lake
- Basin countries: United States
- Surface elevation: 1,342 ft (409 m)

Scatterwood Lake is a natural lake in South Dakota, in the United States.

The lake is in two parts: North Scatterwood Lake and South Scatterwood Lake. Google maps and the GNIS database suggest that the south lake may be the one that is also known as just Scatterwood lake? The north lake has an elevation of 1,332 feet (406 m) and the south lake 1,339 feet (408 m) suggesting a flow from south to north?

Scatterwood Lake was descriptively named by John C. Frémont and Joseph Nicollet.

== See also ==
- List of lakes in South Dakota
