= Mutske Lake =

Lake in the state of South Dakota, United States

- Location within South Dakota Location within the United States
- Location: Campbell County, South Dakota
- Coordinates: 45°48′19″N 99°45′51″W
- Type: Lake
- Basin countries: United States
- Surface area: 100 acres (40 ha) in 1940
- Surface elevation: 1,775 ft (541 m)

Mutske Lake, or Mutzke Lake or Matzke Lake, is a lake in Campbell County, South Dakota, in the United States. It is impounded by the Matzke Lake Dam.

The dam was named in honor of Berthold Matzke, a pioneer who settled at the lake. It covered 100 acres (40 ha) in 1940.

== See also ==
- List of lakes in South Dakota
