= Connors Lake (South Dakota) =

Lake in South Dakota, United States

- Location within South Dakota Location within the United States
- Location: Beadle County, South Dakota
- Coordinates: 44.5734548°N 98.1677219°W
- Type: lake
- Surface elevation: 1,247 feet (380 m)

Connors Lake is a lake in South Dakota, in the United States.

Connors Lake has the name of John Connors, a pioneer.

== See also ==
- List of lakes in South Dakota
