= Diamond Lake (South Dakota) =

Lake in the state of South Dakota, United States

- Location within South Dakota Location within the United States
- Location: Minnehaha County, South Dakota
- Coordinates: 43.8420087°N 97.1021147°W
- Type: lake
- Surface elevation: 1,709 feet (521 m)

Diamond Lake is a natural lake in South Dakota, in the United States.

Diamond Lake was named on account of its outline resembling a diamond.

== See also ==
- List of lakes in South Dakota
