= Fish Lake (Aurora County, South Dakota) =

Lake in the state of South Dakota, United States

- Location within South Dakota Location within the United States
- Location: Aurora County, South Dakota
- Coordinates: 43.7243748°N 98.3899845°W
- Type: lake
- Surface elevation: 1,430 feet (440 m)

Fish Lake is a natural lake in South Dakota, in the United States.

Fish Lake received its name from the large stock of fish in its waters.

== See also ==
- List of lakes in South Dakota
