= Lake Cochrane =

Lake in the state of South Dakota, United States

- Location within South Dakota
- Location: Deuel County, South Dakota
- Coordinates: 44°42′29″N 96°28′41″W
- Type: Lake
- Basin countries: United States
- Surface area: 350 acres (140 ha)
- Surface elevation: 1,683 ft (513 m)

Lake Cochrane is a lake in South Dakota, in the United States.

Lake Cochrane has the name of Byron J. Cochrane, a pioneer who settled at the lake in the 1870s.

== See also ==
- List of lakes in South Dakota
