= Simpson Lake (South Dakota) =

Former lake in South Dakota, U.S.

- Location within South Dakota Location within the United States
- Location: Douglas County, South Dakota
- Coordinates: 43.3956792°N 98.4127279°W
- Type: lake
- Surface elevation: 1,526 feet (465 m)

Simpson Lake is a former lake in South Dakota, in the United States.

Simpson Lake had the name of Seymour Simpson, a pioneer who settled there.

== See also ==
- List of lakes in South Dakota
