= Twomile Lake =

Lake in the state of South Dakota, United States

- Location within South Dakota
- Location: Marshall County, South Dakota
- Coordinates: 45°40′51″N 97°33′07″W
- Type: lake
- Basin countries: United States
- Surface elevation: 1,791 ft (546 m)

Twomile Lake is a lake in South Dakota, in the United States.

Twomile Lake was named from its distance, two miles (3.2 km) from Fort Sisseton.

== See also ==
- List of lakes in South Dakota
