= Rush Lake (South Dakota) =

Lake in the state of South Dakota, United States

- Location within South Dakota
- Location: Day County, South Dakota
- Coordinates: 45°20′56″N 97°21′52″W
- Type: lake
- Basin countries: United States
- Surface elevation: 1,801 ft (549 m)

Rush Lake is a natural lake in South Dakota, in the United States.

Rush Lake received its name from the rush which occurs at the lake.

== See also ==
- List of lakes in South Dakota
