= Lake Badus =

Lake in the state of South Dakota, United States

- Location within South Dakota
- Location: Lake County, South Dakota
- Coordinates: 44°08′49″N 97°08′59″W
- Type: lake
- Basin countries: United States
- Surface elevation: 1,716 ft (523 m)

Lake Badus is a lake in South Dakota, in the United States.

Lake Badus takes its name from a mountain of the same name, Piz Badus in Switzerland, the native land of a share of the first settlers.

== See also ==
- List of lakes in South Dakota
