= Salt Lake (Minnesota–South Dakota) =

Alkaline lake in the state of Minnesota, United States

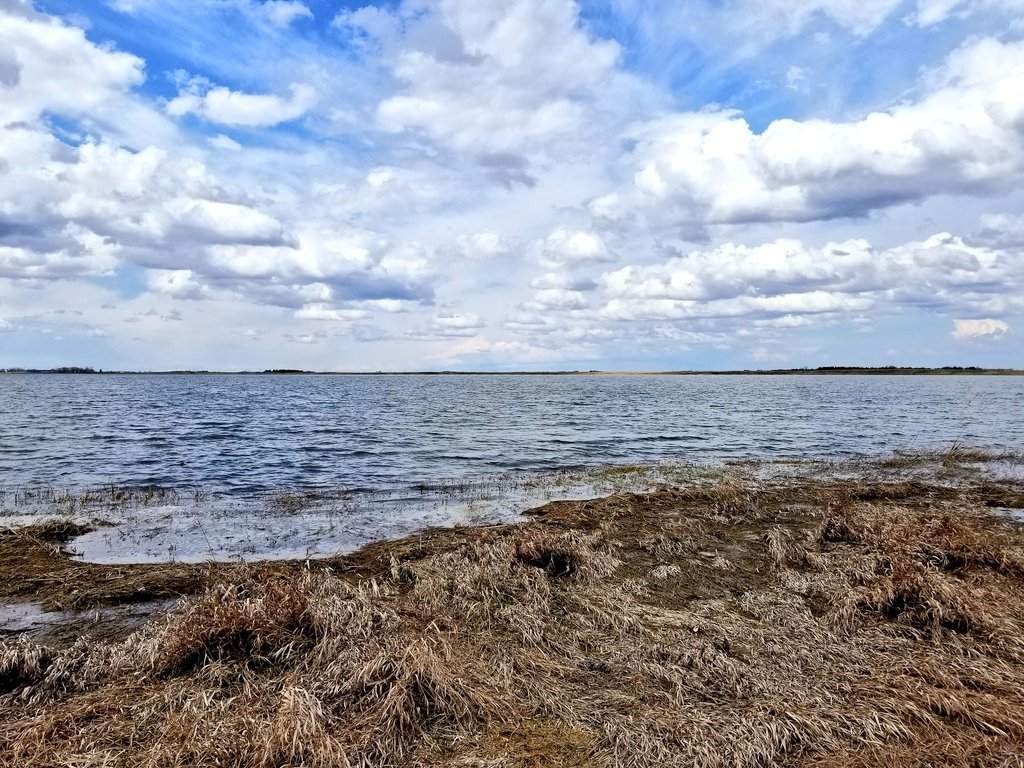
- Southeast shore of Salt Lake

- Location within Minnesota Location within South Dakota Location within the United States
- Location: Lac qui Parle County, Minnesota and Deuel County, South Dakota
- Coordinates: 44°57′53″N 96°26′40″W
- Basin countries: United States
- Surface area: 312 acres (126 ha)
- Surface elevation: 1,145 ft (349 m)

Salt Lake is a natural lake lying between Minnesota and South Dakota in the United States.

Salt Lake received its name due to the naturally occurring salt at the lake shore, a by-product of the alkaline soils which surround the lake. It is the only alkaline lake in Minnesota and its water is approximately one-third the salinity of sea water. Salt grasses grow along the shore and in the lake's water.

The site is one of the most popular birdwatching sites in Minnesota. One hundred and forty one different species of birds have been identified by birders in the vicinity of the lake. Sago pondweed and fairy shrimp in the lake attract large flocks of waterfowl and shorebirds. Frequently seen birds at Salt Lake include avocets, willets and ducks such as the canvasback, gadwall, and shoveler.

Like other prairie basin lakes, Salt Lake has dry and wet cycles in which the lake will periodically dry out completely. During dry years, exposed wetland mud flats are streaked in white layers of salt.

== See also ==
- List of lakes in Minnesota
- List of lakes in South Dakota
