= Clear Lake (Deuel County, South Dakota) =

Lake in the state of South Dakota, United States

- Location within South Dakota Location within the United States
- Location: Deuel County, South Dakota
- Coordinates: 44°45′14″N 96°39′27″W
- Type: lake
- Surface elevation: 1,775 feet (541 m)

Clear Lake is a lake in Deuel County, in the U.S. state of South Dakota.

Clear Lake was named on account of its exceptionally clear water.

== See also ==
- List of lakes in South Dakota
