= Long Lake (Lake County, South Dakota) =

Lake in the state of South Dakota, United States

- Location in South Dakota
- Location: Lake County, South Dakota, United States
- Coordinates: 43°56′00″N 97°00′27″W
- Basin countries: United States
- Surface elevation: 1,610 ft (490 m)

Long Lake is a natural lake in South Dakota, in the United States.

Long Lake was descriptively named on account of the lake's relatively long outline.

== See also ==
- List of lakes in South Dakota
