= Round Lake (Clark County, South Dakota) =

Lake in the state of South Dakota, United States

- Location within South Dakota Location within the United States
- Location: Clark County, South Dakota
- Coordinates: 45°02′11″N 97°46′23″W
- Type: lake
- Surface elevation: 1,759 feet (536 m)

Round Lake is a natural lake in Clark County, South Dakota, in the United States. The lake is found at an elevation of 1,759 feet (536 m)

Round Lake received its name on account of its round outline.

== See also ==
- List of lakes in South Dakota
