= Greys Lake =

Lake in the state of South Dakota, United States

- Location within South Dakota
- Location: Marshall County, South Dakota
- Coordinates: 45°43′03″N 97°15′24″W
- Type: lake
- Basin countries: United States
- Surface elevation: 1,946 ft (593 m)

Greys Lake is a natural lake in located just 10.6 miles (17.1 km) from Sisseton, in Marshall County, South Dakota, in the United States near Long Hollow Housing, SD.

Greys Lake has the name of a local family of settlers.

== See also ==
- List of lakes in South Dakota
