= Silver Lake (Miner County, South Dakota) =

Lake in the state of South Dakota, United States

- Location within South Dakota Location within the United States
- Location: Miner County, South Dakota
- Coordinates: 44.0338028°N 97.3956437°W
- Type: lake
- Surface elevation: 1,660 feet (510 m)

Silver Lake is a natural lake in South Dakota, United States of America.

Silver Lake received its name on account of the appearance of the clear lake water.

== See also ==
- List of lakes in South Dakota
