= Crooked Lake (South Dakota) =

Lake in the state of South Dakota, United States

- Location within South Dakota Location within the United States
- Location: Grant County, South Dakota
- Coordinates: 45.0184674°N 96.8536252°W
- Type: lake
- Surface elevation: 1,870 feet (570 m)

Crooked Lake is a lake in South Dakota, in the United States.

Crooked Lake was so named on account of its irregular outline.

== See also ==
- List of lakes in South Dakota
