= Hillhead, South Dakota =

Unincorporated community in South Dakota, US

Coordinates: 45°50′06″N 97°23′31″W

Hillhead is an unincorporated community in Marshall County, in the U.S. state of South Dakota. Hillhead is located approximately 2 kilometers northeast of Abraham Lake.

== History ==
An early variant name was Airmount. A post office called Airmount was established in 1916. The name was changed to Hilltop shortly after, due to the similar sounding name Fairmount, ND. In 1917 the name was changed to Hillhead, and the post office closed in 1960.
