= Lake Marsh (South Dakota) =

Lake in the state of South Dakota, United States

- Location within South Dakota
- Location: Hamlin County, South Dakota
- Coordinates: 44°38′39″N 97°14′33″W
- Type: lake
- Basin countries: United States
- Surface elevation: 1,670 ft (510 m)

Lake Marsh is a natural lake in South Dakota, in the United States.

Lake Marsh has all of the qualities of a marsh, hence the name.

== See also ==
- List of lakes in South Dakota
