= Salt Lake (Brown County, South Dakota) =

Natural lake in South Dakota

- Location within South Dakota Location within the United States
- Location: Brown County, South Dakota
- Coordinates: 45.2767785°N 98.6946248°W
- Type: lake
- Surface elevation: 1,302 feet (397 m)

Salt Lake is a natural lake in South Dakota, in the United States.

Salt Lake was named on account of its salty water.

== See also ==
- List of lakes in South Dakota
