= Lake Mary (South Dakota) =

Lake in the state of South Dakota, United States

- Location within South Dakota Location within the United States
- Location: Hamlin County, South Dakota
- Coordinates: 44.5842667°N 97.1810919°W
- Type: lake
- Surface elevation: 1,650 feet (500 m)

Lake Mary is a natural lake in South Dakota, in the United States. Lake Mary has the name of the mother of a first settler.

== See also ==
- List of lakes in South Dakota
