= Silver Lake (Hutchinson County, South Dakota) =

Lake in the state of South Dakota, United States

- Location within South Dakota Location within the United States
- Location: Hutchinson County, South Dakota
- Coordinates: 43.4490607°N 97.4103430°W
- Type: lake
- Surface elevation: 1,434 feet (437 m)

Silver Lake is a natural lake in South Dakota, in the United States.

Silver Lake received its name on account of the silvery appearance of its surface.

Silver Lake has 431 surface acres. The primary fishing is for Northern Pike, Silver Carp, and Yellow Bullhead. There is a boat ramp on the east side of the lake; the parking and picnic area on the west side of the lake was closed in 2018.

== See also ==
- List of lakes in South Dakota
