= Turtle Creek (South Dakota) =

Stream in South Dakota, U.S.

Coordinates: 44°54′46″N 98°29′07″W

Turtle Creek is a stream in the U.S. state of South Dakota.

Turtle Creek once was the natural habitat of turtles, hence the name.

== See also ==
- List of rivers of South Dakota
