= Scott Lake (South Dakota) =

Lake in the state of South Dakota, United States

- Location within South Dakota Location within the United States
- Location: Aurora County, South Dakota
- Coordinates: 43.7482080°N 98.6403549°W
- Type: lake
- Surface elevation: 1,601 feet (488 m)

Scott Lake is a natural lake in Aurora County, South Dakota, in the United States.

Scott Lake has the name of B. E. Scott, a pioneer who settled there.

== See also ==
- List of lakes in South Dakota
