= Piyas Lake =

Lake in the state of South Dakota, United States

- Location within South Dakota
- Location: Marshall County, South Dakota
- Coordinates: 45°35′08″N 97°20′00″W
- Type: lake
- Basin countries: United States
- Surface elevation: 1,834 ft (559 m)

Piyas Lake is a natural lake in South Dakota, in the United States.

Piyas Lake has the name of Piya, a local Native American.

== See also ==
- List of lakes in South Dakota
