= Medicine Lake (South Dakota) =

Lake in the state of South Dakota, United States

- Location within South Dakota Location within the United States
- Location: Codington County, South Dakota
- Coordinates: 44.9841655°N 97.3519987°W
- Type: lake
- Surface elevation: 1,716 feet (523 m)

Medicine Lake is a natural lake in South Dakota, in the United States.

The lake's name comes from the Sioux Indians of the area, who believed the waters of Medicine Lake held medicinal qualities.

== See also ==
- List of lakes in South Dakota
