= Mud Lake (South Dakota) =

Lake in the state of South Dakota, United States

There are over a dozen lakes named Mud Lake within the U.S. state of South Dakota. According to the Federal Writers' Project, these lakes were so named on account of the muddy condition of the lake bed or lake shore.

- Mud Lake, Brule County, South Dakota. 43°49′38″N 99°02′03″W
- Mud Lake, Clark County, South Dakota. 44°38′14″N 97°38′22″W
- Mud Lake, Clark County, South Dakota. 44°51′17″N 97°44′15″W
- Mud Lake, Day County, South Dakota. 45°14′22″N 97°37′20″W
- Mud Lake, Deuel County, South Dakota. 44°46′22″N 96°35′27″W
- Mud Lake, Grant County, South Dakota. 45°00′32″N 96°40′36″W
- Mud Lake, Kingsbury County, South Dakota. 44°28′48″N 97°35′21″W
- Mud Lake, Lake County, South Dakota. 44°10′08″N 96°58′33″W
- Mud Lake, Lawrence County, South Dakota. 44°33′44″N 103°59′54″W
- Mud Lake, Marshall County, South Dakota. 45°43′41″N 97°15′48″W
- Mud Lake, Moody County, South Dakota. 43°59′55″N 96°47′23″W
- Mud Lake, Pennington County, South Dakota. 43°58′07″N 103°55′10″W
- Mud Lake, Pennington County, South Dakota. 44°06′35″N 103°52′50″W
- Mud Lake, Roberts County, South Dakota. 45°28′38″N 96°55′03″W
- Mud Lake, Spink County, South Dakota. 44°46′17″N 98°30′39″W
- Mud Lake, Spink County, South Dakota. 44°53′30″N 98°36′08″W
- Mud Lake, Turner County, South Dakota. 43°17′54″N 97°02′46″W

== See also ==
- List of South Dakota lakes
- List of lakes in the United States
