= Round Lake (Lake County, South Dakota) =

Lake in the state of South Dakota, United States

- Location within South Dakota Location within the United States
- Location: Lake County, South Dakota
- Coordinates: 43.9344286°N 96.9790408°W
- Type: lake
- Surface elevation: 1,598 feet (487 m)

Round Lake is a natural lake in South Dakota, in the United States. It connects the larger Lake Madison to the northwest to Brant Lake to the southeast.

Round Lake received its name on account of its round outline.

== See also ==
- List of lakes in South Dakota
