= Kidder, South Dakota =

Small American census area

Coordinates: 45°52′54″N 97°42′50″W

Kidder is a census-designated place that is located in Marshall County, South Dakota, United States. Its population was 25 at the 2020 census.

Kidder was laid out in 1885 and most likely was named after Jefferson P. Kidder, a Dakota Territory legislator. It is approximately eight miles north of Britton, the county seat of Marshall County. The streets of the CDP's are named after trees (ex. Pine St., Elm St.), while the avenues of the CDP are named after fruits (ex. Plum Ave., Apple Ave.)
