= Cottonwood Lake (Sully County, South Dakota) =

Lake in the state of South Dakota, United States

- Location within South Dakota Location within the United States
- Location: Sully County, South Dakota
- Coordinates: 44.8355740°N 99.9058888°W
- Type: lake
- Surface elevation: 1,801 feet (549 m)

Cottonwood Lake is a lake in South Dakota, in the United States.

The lake was so named on account of the cottonwood trees which grew there.

== See also ==
- List of lakes in South Dakota
