= Cottonwood Lake (Spink County, South Dakota) =

Lake in the state of South Dakota, United States

- Location within South Dakota Location within the United States
- Location: Spink County, South Dakota
- Coordinates: 44.7899106°N 98.6745112°W
- Type: lake
- Surface elevation: 1,319 feet (402 m)

Cottonwood Lake is a lake in South Dakota, in the United States.

The lake was so named on account of the cottonwood trees which grew there.

In the first half of the 20th century rodeos have been held near Cottonwood Lake.

== See also ==
- List of lakes in South Dakota
