= Willow Lake (South Dakota) =

Lake in the state of South Dakota, United States

- Location within South Dakota Location within the United States
- Location: Clark County, South Dakota
- Coordinates: 44.6508646°N 97.6398816°W
- Type: lake
- Surface elevation: 1,762 feet (537 m)

Willow Lake is a lake in South Dakota, in the United States.

Willow Lake was named for the willow trees which lined its shores.

== See also ==
- List of lakes in South Dakota
