= Heggs Lake =

Lake in the state of South Dakota, United States

- Location within South Dakota Location within the United States
- Location: South Dakota
- Coordinates: 45°07′03″N 97°31′27″W
- Type: lake
- Basin countries: United States
- Surface elevation: 1,745 ft (532 m)

Heggs Lake is a natural lake in South Dakota, in the United States.

Heggs Lake has the name of Ole Hegg, a pioneer who settled there.

== See also ==
- List of lakes in South Dakota
