= Platte Lake (South Dakota) =

Lake in the state of South Dakota, United States

- Location within South Dakota Location within the United States
- Location: Aurora County, South Dakota
- Coordinates: 43.6661075°N 98.7738487°W
- Type: lake
- Surface elevation: 1,542 feet (470 m)

Platte Lake is a natural lake in South Dakota, in the United States.

Platte Lake took its name from nearby Platte Creek.

== See also ==
- List of lakes in South Dakota
