= Abraham Lake (South Dakota) =

Lake in the state of South Dakota, United States

- Location within South Dakota Location within the United States
- Location: Marshall County, South Dakota
- Coordinates: 45.815009°N 97.364642°W
- Type: Lake
- Surface elevation: 1,818 feet (554 m)

Abraham Lake is a lake in South Dakota, in the United States.

Abraham Lake bears the name of a local Native American family.

== See also ==
- List of lakes in South Dakota
