= Lake Todd (Minnesota) =

Lake in the state of Minnesota, United States

- Location within Minnesota Location within the United States
- Location: McLeod County, Minnesota
- Coordinates: 44°58′15″N 94°20′52″W
- Type: lake
- Basin countries: United States
- Surface elevation: 1,063 ft (324 m)

Lake Todd is a lake in McLeod County, in the U.S. state of Minnesota.

Lake Todd was named for Daniel S. Todd, a pioneer who settled there.
