= Dog Ear Creek =

Stream in South Dakota, United States

Coordinates: 43.636608°N 99.993648°W

Dog Ear Creek is a stream in the U.S. state of South Dakota.

Dog Ear Creek has the name of a Sioux chief.

== See also ==
- List of rivers of South Dakota
