= Lake Platte (South Dakota) =

Lake in the state of South Dakota, United States

- Location within South Dakota Location within the United States
- Location: Charles Mix County, South Dakota
- Coordinates: 43.3849103°N 98.8911087°W
- Type: lake
- Surface elevation: 1,467 feet (447 m)

Lake Platte is a lake in South Dakota, in the United States.

Lake Platte took its name from nearby Platte, South Dakota.

== Climate ==
The average temperature is 10°C . The warmest month is July, at 26°C , and the coldest is January, at −7°C. The average rainfall is 801 mm per year. The wettest month is August, at 110 mm of rain, and the driest is January, at 24 mm.

== See also ==
- List of lakes in South Dakota
