= Dog Ear Lake =

Lake in the state of South Dakota, United States

- Location within South Dakota
- Location: Tripp County, South Dakota
- Coordinates: 43°10′14″N 99°53′42″W
- Type: lake
- Basin countries: United States
- Surface elevation: 2,300 ft (701 m)

Dog Ear Lake is a natural lake in South Dakota, in the United States.

Dog Ear Lake has the name of an Indian chief who settled there.

== See also ==
- List of lakes in South Dakota
