= Goose Lake (South Dakota) =

Lake in the state of South Dakota, United States

- Location within South Dakota Location within the United States
- Location: Codington County, South Dakota
- Coordinates: 44.8466112°N 97.2727864°W
- Type: lake
- Surface elevation: 1,716 feet (523 m)

Goose Lake is a natural lake in South Dakota, in the United States.

Goose Lake is a natural habitat of geese, hence the name.

== See also ==
- List of lakes in South Dakota
