= Lone Tree Lake (Deuel County, South Dakota) =

Lake in the state of South Dakota, United States

- Location within South Dakota Location within the United States
- Location: Deuel County, South Dakota
- Coordinates: 44.8727417°N 96.5830427°W
- Type: Natural freshwater lake
- Basin countries: United States
- Max. length: 4,230 ft (1,290 m)
- Max. width: 2,075 ft (632 m)
- Surface elevation: 1,627 feet (496 m)

Lone Tree Lake is a natural lake in South Dakota, in the United States.

Lone Tree Lake was named on account of there being a single tree which stood there.

== See also ==
- List of lakes in South Dakota
