= School Lake (Berrien County, Michigan) =

- Location within Michigan
- Location: Berrien County, Michigan
- Coordinates: 41°58′17″N 86°14′37″W
- Type: lake

School Lake is a lake in Berrien County, Michigan. It was named after a schoolhouse that once stood near its southeastern shore.
