= Deadman Lake (Alberta) =

- Location within Alberta
- Location: Sturgeon County, Alberta, Canada
- Coordinates: 53.8654°N 114.0125°W
- Type: lake

Deadman Lake is a lake in Sturgeon County, Alberta, Canada, located northwest of the city of Edmonton.

Deadman Lake's name comes from the Cree Indians of the area, on account of a deadly brawl which once took place near this lake.

== See also ==
- List of lakes of Alberta
