= Badger Lake (Alberta) =

Lake in Alberta, Canada

- Location within Alberta
- Location: Alberta
- Coordinates: 50.380278°N 112.46444°W
- Basin countries: Canada
- Max. length: 4.14 kilometres (2.57 mi)
- Max. width: 2.97 kilometres (1.85 mi)
- Surface elevation: 823.30 metres (2,701.1 ft)

Badger Lake is a lake in Vulcan County, Alberta, Canada. It is located about 135 km southeast of Calgary and 80 km northeast of Lethbridge. It is rated as having very high risk of depletion populations of walleye and high risk of depletion populations of northern pike.

Badger Lake was named on account of badgers in the area.

== Badger Lake Ice Fishing Derby ==
The Badger Lake Ice Fishing Derby has been held annually in late February on the lake, dating back to 1988.

== See also ==
- List of lakes of Alberta
