= Grass Lake (Codington County, South Dakota) =

Lake in the state of South Dakota, United States

- Location within South Dakota Location within the United States
- Location: Codington County, South Dakota
- Coordinates: 45.0719622°N 97.3836820°W
- Type: lake
- Surface elevation: 1,742 feet (531 m)

Grass Lake is a natural lake in Codington County, South Dakota, United States. Humboldt is the closest town to the lake.

Grass grew in abundance at Grass Lake, hence the name.

== See also ==
- List of lakes in South Dakota
