= Lake Tetonkaha =

Lake in the state of South Dakota, United States

- Location within South Dakota
- Location: Brookings County, South Dakota
- Coordinates: 44°26′03″N 96°59′33″W
- Type: lake
- Basin countries: United States
- Surface elevation: 1,627 ft (496 m)

Lake Tetonkaha is a natural lake in South Dakota, in the United States.

Tetonkaha is a name derived from the Sioux language meaning "standing of the big lodging house".

== See also ==
- List of lakes in South Dakota
