= Lake Lynn (Cabarrus County, North Carolina) =

- Location in North Carolina
- Location: Cabarrus County, North Carolina
- Coordinates: 35°23′54″N 80°31′50″W
- Surface elevation: 594 feet (181 m)

Lake Lynn is a small 18 acre (7.3 ha) lake located in the central part of Cabarrus County, North Carolina. It is situated between state highway 73 East and Old Airport Road. Lake Lynn Road connects these two through a twisting two lane road and affords some views of the lake and its small ponds. Lake Lynn is a natural lake and averages 28 feet (8.5 m) in depth. Some species of wildlife you may find in and around the lake are deer, squirrel, raccoon, opossum, skunk, small mouth bass, brim.
