= Platte Lake Township, Crow Wing County, Minnesota =

Township in Minnesota, United States

Platte Lake Township
- Township
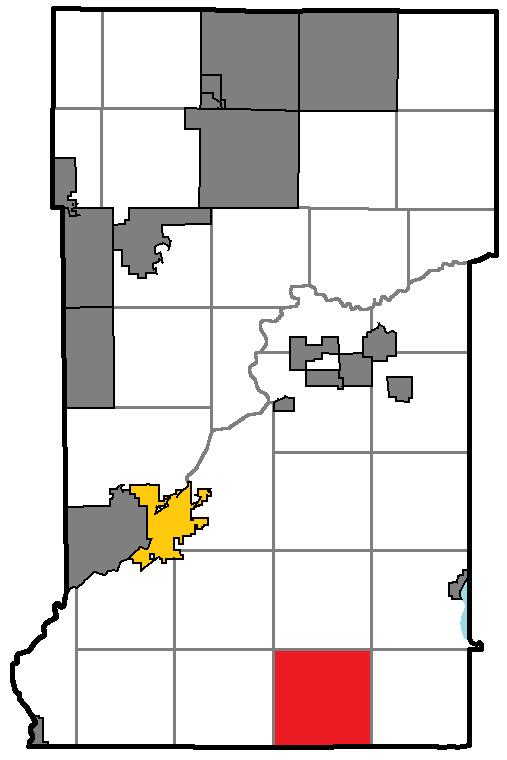
- Location of Platte Lake Township, within Crow Wing County, Minnesota
- Coordinates: 46°11′34″N 94°0′35″W
- Country: United States
- State: Minnesota
- County: Crow Wing

Area
  - Total: 36.0 sq mi (93.2 km^{2})
  - Land: 35.6 sq mi (92.3 km^{2})
  - Water: 0.31 sq mi (0.8 km^{2})
- Elevation: 1,296 ft (395 m)

Population (2020)
  - Total: 419
  - Density: 11.8/sq mi (4.54/km^{2})
- Time zone: UTC-6 (Central (CST))
  - Summer (DST): UTC-5 (CDT)
- FIPS code: 27-51496
- GNIS feature ID: 0665318

Platte Lake Township is a township in Crow Wing County, Minnesota, United States. The population was 419 at the 2020 census. This township took its name from Platte Lake.

== Geography ==
According to the United States Census Bureau, the township has a total area of 36.0 square miles (93.2 km^{2}), of which 35.7 square miles (92.3 km^{2}) is land and 0.3 square mile (0.8 km^{2}) (0.89%) is water.

== Demographics ==
As of the census of 2000, there were 305 people, 112 households, and 84 families residing in the township. The population density was 8.6 people per square mile (3.3/km^{2}). There were 161 housing units at an average density of 4.5/sq mi (1.7/km^{2}). The racial makeup of the township was 94.10% White, 0.66% Native American, 2.30% Asian, 1.31% from other races, and 1.64% from two or more races. Hispanic or Latino of any race were 0.98% of the population.

There were 112 households, out of which 38.4% had children under the age of 18 living with them, 60.7% were married couples living together, 8.0% had a female householder with no husband present, and 25.0% were non-families. 20.5% of all households were made up of individuals, and 7.1% had someone living alone who was 65 years of age or older. The average household size was 2.72 and the average family size was 3.11.

In the township the population was spread out, with 26.2% under the age of 18, 9.5% from 18 to 24, 32.1% from 25 to 44, 23.6% from 45 to 64, and 8.5% who were 65 years of age or older. The median age was 34 years. For every 100 females, there were 95.5 males. For every 100 females age 18 and over, there were 108.3 males.

The median income for a household in the township was $32,857, and the median income for a family was $41,667. Males had a median income of $25,750 versus $28,750 for females. The per capita income for the township was $14,899. About 8.0% of families and 10.2% of the population were below the poverty line, including 6.7% of those under the age of eighteen and 20.7% of those 65 or over.
