= Buffalo Lakes =

Lake in the state of South Dakota, United States

- Interactive map of Buffalo Lakes
- Location: South Dakota, United States
- Coordinates: 45.6173725°N 97.2853772°W
- Type: Glacial lake
- Primary outflows: James River
- Basin countries: United States

Buffalo Lakes is a lake chain in South Dakota, in the United States. The buffalo lakes include the North Buffalo lake and the South Buffalo lake. The South Buffalo lake has five unnamed tributaries that flow to the North Buffalo lake. Buffalo Lakes takes its name from Buffalo Township. The nearest city to this lake is Long hollow, South Dakota.

== South Buffalo lake ==
This is a lake with a max depth of 3.6576 meters (12 feet) and a surface area of 1780 acres. The shoreline is 27.8 miles.

== North Buffalo lake ==
This is similar to South Buffalo lake. It is 3.6576 meters deep at its maximum (12 feet) and a surface area of 1780 acres. The shoreline of this lake is 27.8 miles.

== Fishing ==
South Buffalo Lake is mainly used for bluegill, northern pike, walleye and yellow perch fishery.

== See also ==
- List of lakes in South Dakota
