= Antelope Lake (Day County, South Dakota) =

Lake in the state of South Dakota, United States

- Location within South Dakota Location within the United States
- Location: Day County, South Dakota
- Coordinates: 45.2885208°N 97.4788673°W
- Type: Lake
- Surface elevation: 1,814 feet (553 m)

Antelope Lake is a lake in Day County, South Dakota, in the United States.

Antelope Lake was named for the antelope seen near it by first settlers.

== See also ==
- List of lakes in South Dakota
