= Bitter Lake (Day County, South Dakota) =

Lake in the state of South Dakota, United States

- Location within South Dakota
- Location: South Dakota
- Coordinates: 45.2726302°N 97.3246646°W
- Type: lake
- Surface elevation: 1,801 feet (549 m)

Bitter Lake is a lake in South Dakota, in the United States.

Bitter Lake contains bitter tasting lake water, hence the name.

== See also ==
- List of lakes in South Dakota
