= Oak Lake (Polk County, Minnesota) =

Lake in the state of Minnesota, United States

- Location within Minnesota
- Location: Polk County, Minnesota
- Coordinates: 47°39′42″N 95°57′48″W
- Type: lake

Oak Lake is a lake in Polk County, in the U.S. state of Minnesota.

Oak Lake was so named for the oak trees near the lake shore.

== See also ==
- List of lakes in Minnesota
