= Deadmans Lake (South Dakota) =

Lake in the state of South Dakota, United States

- Location within South Dakota Location within the United States
- Location: Bennett County, South Dakota
- Coordinates: 43.1950320°N 101.5559810°W
- Type: lake
- Surface elevation: 2,972 feet (906 m)

Deadmans Lake is a natural lake in South Dakota, in the United States.

Deadmans Lake received its name because a homicide victim was discovered near its shore.

== See also ==
- List of lakes in South Dakota
