= Flat Lake (South Dakota) =

Lake in the state of South Dakota, United States

- Location within South Dakota Location within the United States
- Location: Marshall County, South Dakota
- Coordinates: 45.7996125°N 97.4047801°W
- Type: lake
- Surface elevation: 1,873 feet (571 m)

Flat Lake is a natural lake in South Dakota, in the United States.

Flat Lake received its name from the flat terrain of the site.

== See also ==
- List of lakes in South Dakota
