= Cottonwood Lake (Clark County, South Dakota) =

Lake in the state of South Dakota, United States

- Location within South Dakota Location within the United States
- Location: Clark County, South Dakota
- Coordinates: 45.1276426°N 97.6994205°W
- Type: lake
- Surface elevation: 1,791 feet (546 m)

Cottonwood Lake is a lake in South Dakota, in the United States.

The lake was so named on account of the cottonwood trees which grew there.

== See also ==
- List of lakes in South Dakota
