= Cottonwood Lake (Grant and Stevens counties, Minnesota) =

Lake in the state of Minnesota, United States

- Location within Minnesota
- Location: Grant and Stevens County, Minnesota
- Coordinates: 45°45′40″N 96°1′11″W
- Type: Lake
- Surface elevation: 1,102 feet (336 m)

Cottonwood Lake is a lake in Grant County and Stevens counties, in the U.S. state of Minnesota.

Cottonwood Lake was named for the cottonwood trees near its banks.

== See also ==
- List of lakes in Minnesota
