= Lords Lake (South Dakota) =

Lake in the state of South Dakota, United States

- Location within South Dakota Location within the United States
- Location: Brown County, South Dakota
- Coordinates: 45.3874255°N 98.5826637°W
- Type: lake
- Surface elevation: 1,319 feet (402 m)

Lords Lake is a natural lake in South Dakota, in the United States.

Lords Lake has the name of James Lord, an early settler.

== See also ==
- List of lakes in South Dakota
