= School Lake (Brown County, Minnesota) =

Lake in Brown County, Minnesota

- Location within Minnesota
- Location: Brown County, Minnesota, United States
- Coordinates: 44°15′0″N 94°33′39″W
- Type: Natural
- Basin countries: United States
- Surface area: 102.81 acres (416,100 m^{2})

School Lake is a lake in Brown County, Minnesota, in the United States. It is a 102-acre protected lake.

School Lake was named from its location in the school section 16.

== See also ==
- List of lakes in Minnesota
- List of fishes of Minnesota
