= Lake Iroquois (Vermont) =

- Location within Vermont Location within the United States
- Location: Chittenden County, Vermont, United States
- Coordinates: 44°22′15″N 073°05′04″W
- Type: reservoir
- Basin countries: United States
- Surface area: 247 acres (1.00 km^{2})
- Surface elevation: 686 ft (209 m)
- Settlements: Hinesburg / Williston / Richmond

Lake Iroquois is a 247-acre (1.00 km^{2}) reservoir in northwestern Vermont, bordered by three towns: Hinesburg, Williston, and Richmond.

Lake Iroquois (formerly known as Hinesburg pond) was created in 1867 to supply mills in Hinesburg with a better water supply. Building a dam on Pond Brook caused the existing spring-fed pond to rise above its banks and become the current lake. The towns share a beach on the lake, plus there is a public boat access.

Approximately 32 streams flow into the lake on the north, east and west sides, the largest being the one that flows in from the northwest section (crossing Beebe Lane). There are also several streams that bubble up from the lake bottom. The outflow of the lake is over the dam in the south end. The outlet stream flows into Sunset Lake in Hinesburg, and then into the LaPlatte River and into Lake Champlain.

The lake is used extensively throughout the year by residents and by visitors. The Lake Iroquois Recreation District (LIRD) maintains the public beach at the north end of the lake. The LIRD also maintains a trail network on the land around the lake. The trails are accessible from the beach parking lot. The Vermont Department of Fish and Wildlife maintains the fishing access and boat ramp, also at the north end of the lake, which provides public access to the lake for boating and fishing.

Lake Surface Area: 247 acres Drainage Basin Area: 2, 418 acres Maximum Depth: 37 ft. Average Depth: 19 ft. Elevation: 685 ft.

The Lake Iroquois Association (LIA) was founded in 2007 to enhance the water quality of Lake Iroquois and to protect the health of the surrounding ecosystem. The LIA is an all volunteer membership organization, governed by an elected board of directors. The LIA does much work around the lake including managing the greeter program and boat wash station, overseeing various projects to reduce phosphorus and sediment runoff into the lake, working on controlling the infestation of Eurasian watermilfoil and preventing other invasives from entering the lake, and outreach to all lake users and lake property owners to provide information and education on best practices for maintaining the health of the lake and surrounding ecosystem.
