= Lone Tree Lake (Clark County, South Dakota) =

Lake in the state of South Dakota, United States

- Location within South Dakota Location within the United States
- Location: Clark County, South Dakota
- Coordinates: 45.1436500°N 97.8715362°W
- Type: lake
- Surface elevation: 1,801 feet (549 m)

Lone Tree Lake is a natural lake in South Dakota, in the United States.

Lone Tree Lake was named on account of there being a single cottonwood tree which stood there.

== See also ==
- List of lakes in South Dakota
