= Roy Lake State Park =

State park in South Dakota, United States

- Location within South Dakota
- Location: Marshall County, South Dakota, United States
- Coordinates: 45°42′35″N 97°26′56″W
- Elevation: 1,795 ft (547 m)
- Administrator: South Dakota Department of Game, Fish and Parks
- Website: Official website

Roy Lake State Park is a South Dakota state park three miles southwest of Lake City in Marshall County, South Dakota in the United States. The park is divided in two sections on Roy Lake, and is open for year-round recreation including camping, beaches, swimming, fishing, hiking and boating.

The name of Roy Lake may recall an incident when a dog named Roy drowned at the lake; it also may reflect the name of an early pioneer family, the Roys or Rois.
