= Lake Herman State Park =

State park in Lake County, South Dakota, United States

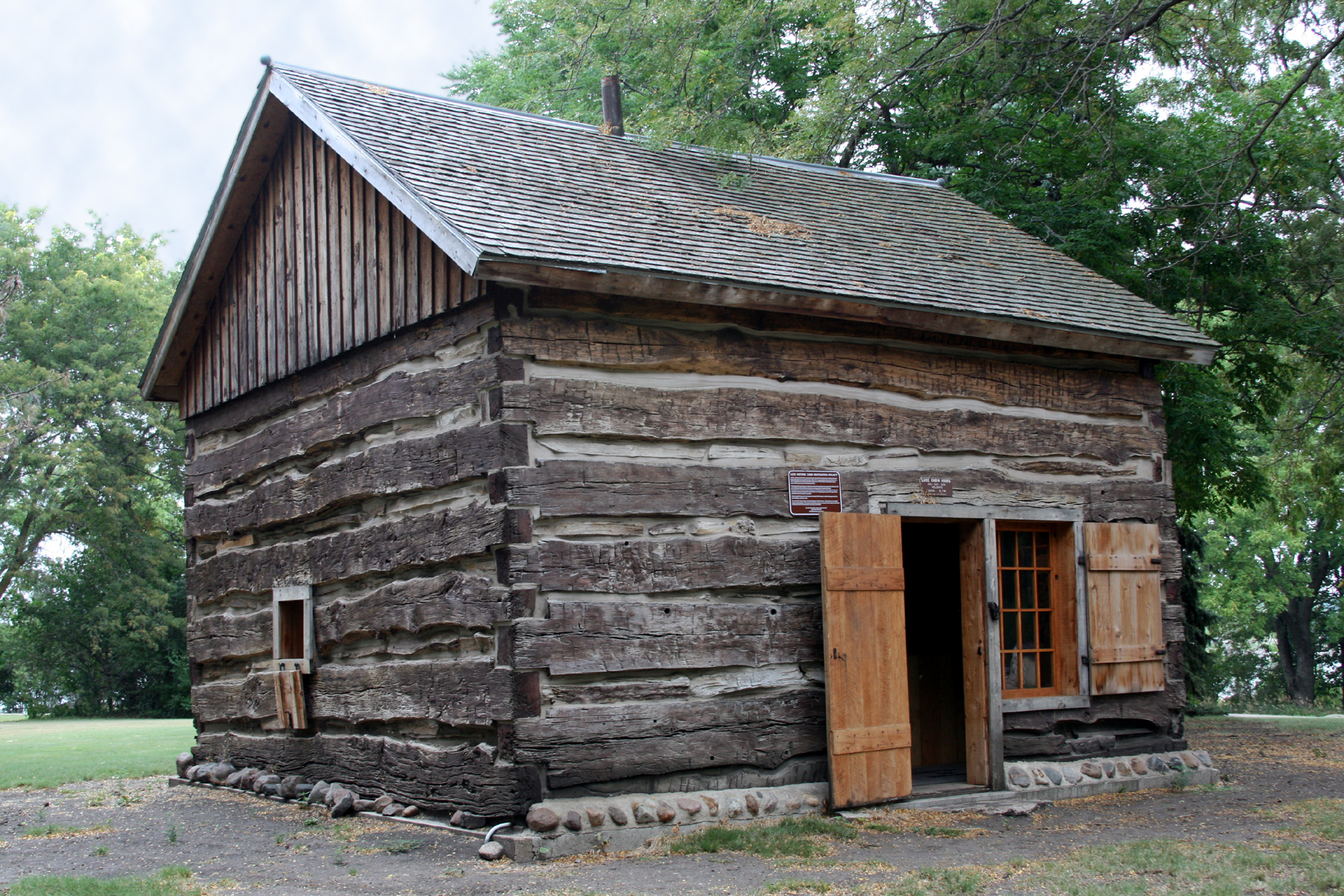
- Herman Luce cabin (ca. 1870-71)

- Location within South Dakota
- Location: Lake County, South Dakota, United States
- Coordinates: 43°59′34″N 97°09′38″W
- Elevation: 1,670 feet
- Established: 1945
- Administrator: South Dakota Department of Game, Fish and Parks
- Website: Official website

Lake Herman State Park is a South Dakota state park in Lake County, South Dakota in the United States. The park is open for year-round recreation including camping, swimming, fishing, hiking and boating on the 1,350-acre Lake Herman. There are 72 campsites which feature electric hook-ups and 4 cabins.

== History ==
Lake Herman is named for Herman Luce, a pioneer who settled near it. The Luce log cabin, which dates from 1871, is preserved in the park.

Lake Herman was among three parks established in 1945 when the South Dakota Legislature created the statewide park system. The other two parks added to the system were Hartford Beach State Park and Oakwood Lakes State Park. Until that time, Custer State Park, which opened in 1919, was the only park managed by the state.

== Recreation ==
Lake Herman State Park offers several recreational activities, including hiking trails, birdwatching, canoe rentals, fishing, and cross country skiing. The park includes three different hiking trails, the Abott Trail, the Pioneer Adventure Trail, and the Luce Adventure Trail. It also offers a nine hole disc golf course that runs throughout the park.

== Herman Luce Cabin ==
The Herman Luce Cabin is a one room, 1 and a half story dwelling of hewn oak logs, built in 1871 on a stone cellar. A 1977 National Register of Historic nomination form describes the building as the second cabin built in Lake County South Dakota and the oldest still standing, and it is one of the few settler cabins that is intact and on its original site. It was the site of the area's first recorded birth. It was also used as the first post office and as a land office for the local community which was named after Herman N. Luce. Luce was a commissioner appointed in 1873 to organize the county. The town was abandoned in 1881 after the railroad bypassed it in favor of Madison, SD and the cabin is the last structure remaining from that period. It was used until 1941 until the land for the park was purchased The graves of four members of Luce's family are west of the cabin.
