= Cherry Lake (South Dakota) =

Lake in the state of South Dakota, United States

- Location within South Dakota Location within the United States
- Location: Clark County, South Dakota
- Coordinates: 44.5456290°N 97.5253618°W
- Type: lake
- Surface elevation: 1,762 feet (537 m)

Cherry Lake is a lake in South Dakota, in the United States.

The lake was named for the abundant growth of chokecherries at the site.

== See also ==
- List of lakes in South Dakota
