= Oak Lake (South Dakota) =

Lake in the state of South Dakota, United States

- Location within South Dakota Location within the United States
- Location: Brookings County, South Dakota
- Coordinates: 44.5156863°N 96.5293621°W
- Type: lake
- Surface elevation: 1,801 feet (549 m)

Oak Lake is a natural lake in South Dakota, in the United States.

Oak Lake was named for a nearby grove of oak trees.

== See also ==
- List of lakes in South Dakota
