= School Lake (South Dakota) =

Lake in the state of South Dakota, United States

- Location within South Dakota
- Location: Deuel County, South Dakota
- Coordinates: 44.9408087°N 96.8180736°W
- Type: lake
- Surface elevation: 1,863 feet (568 m)

School Lake is a natural lake in South Dakota, in the United States.

School Lake was on public land within a school section, hence the name.

== See also ==
- List of lakes in South Dakota
