= Cottonwood Lake (Marshall County, South Dakota) =

Lake in the state of South Dakota, United States

- Location within South Dakota Location within the United States
- Location: Marshall County, South Dakota
- Coordinates: 45°43′57″N 97°25′37″W
- Type: lake
- Surface elevation: 1,827 feet (557 m)

Cottonwood Lake is a lake in Marshall County, South Dakota, in the United States.

The lake was so named on account of the cottonwood trees found at the lake.

== See also ==
- List of lakes in South Dakota
