= Shortfoot Creek =

Stream in North and South Dakota, U.S.

Coordinates: 46°06′54″N 97°22′30″W

Shortfoot Creek is a stream in the U.S. states of North Dakota and South Dakota.

Shortfoot Creek has the name of a member of the Sioux tribe.

== See also ==
- List of rivers of North Dakota
- List of rivers of South Dakota
