= Badger Lakes =

Lakes in Minnesota, U.S.

Coordinates: 43°55′N 95°44′W

- Interactive map of Badger Lakes
- Location: Murray County, Minnesota, United States
- Basin countries: United States

The Badger Lakes are a pair of lakes in Murray County, in the U.S. state of Minnesota.

The lakes are more precisely known as North Badger Lake and South Badger Lake.

These lakes were named for the badgers once seen there.

== See also ==
- List of lakes in Minnesota
