= Dry Lake (Codington County, South Dakota) =

Lake in the state of South Dakota, United States

- Location within South Dakota Location within the United States
- Location: Codington County, South Dakota
- Coordinates: 45°02′33″N 97°19′11″W
- Type: Lake
- Surface elevation: 1,742 feet (531 m)

Dry Lake is a natural lake in Codington County, South Dakota, in the United States found at an elevation of 1,742 feet (531 m).

Dry Lake received its name due to the lake historically being dry.

== See also ==
- List of lakes in South Dakota
