= Lynn Lake (South Dakota) =

Lake in the state of South Dakota, United States

- Location within South Dakota Location within the United States
- Location: Day County, South Dakota
- Coordinates: 45°27′23″N 97°40′19″W
- Type: lake
- Surface elevation: 1,772 feet (540 m)

Lynn Lake is a natural lake in Day County, South Dakota, in the United States. The lake is found at an elevation of 1,772 feet (540 m).

Lynn Lake takes its name from Lynn Township.

== See also ==
- List of lakes in South Dakota
