= Waubay Lake =

Lake in the state of South Dakota, United States

- Location within South Dakota
- Location: Day County, South Dakota
- Coordinates: 45.4122°N 97.401°W
- Type: lake
- Surface area: 15,540 acres (6,290 ha)
- Average depth: 13 feet (4.0 m)
- Max. depth: 31 feet (9.4 m)
- Surface elevation: 1,787 feet (545 m)

Waubay Lake is a natural lake in Day County, South Dakota, in the United States. The lake is southeast of nearby Grenville and is predominantly a fishery for walleye and yellow perch.

The lake used to be four distinct lakes - North Waubay, South Waubay, Spring Lake, and Hillebrands - however, rising water levels have connected the four lakes in the late 1990s into the single lake that it is today.

The fish species present in the lake include northern pike, walleye, smallmouth bass, yellow perch, black bullhead, white bass, common carp, rock bass, black crappie, and lake herring.

== See also ==
- List of lakes in South Dakota
