= Buffalo Lake (Minnehaha County, South Dakota) =

Lake in the state of South Dakota, United States

- Location within South Dakota Location within the United States
- Location: Minnehaha County, South Dakota
- Coordinates: 43.8289234°N 97.0496866°W
- Type: lake
- Surface elevation: 1,650 feet (500 m)

Buffalo Lake is a lake in South Dakota, in the United States.

Buffalo Lake was so named on account of the lake being a natural habitat of buffalo fish.

== See also ==
- List of lakes in South Dakota
