= Platte Lake (Minnesota) =

Lake in the state of Minnesota, United States

- Location within Minnesota
- Location: Minnesota
- Coordinates: 46°10′N 93°56′W
- Type: lake
- River sources: Platte River
- Max. depth: 23 feet (7.0 m)
- Islands: 2

Platte Lake is a lake in the U.S. state of Minnesota. Platte Lake is the source of the Platte River, hence the name. The nearby Platte Lake Township took its name from the lake.

Platte Lake is located in the Crow Wing and Morrison Counties of north-central Minnesota, six miles northeast of the town of Harding at the north end of the Mississippi River-Sartell Watershed. Platte Lake has four inlets and one outlet, which classifies it as a drainage lake. The Platte River flows through the lake and provides a broad connection to Sullivan Lake. The Platte River then eventually joins the Mississippi River.
