= Lake Badger =

Lake in the state of South Dakota, United States

- Location within South Dakota
- Location: Kingsbury County, South Dakota
- Coordinates: 44°27′43″N 97°10′36″W
- Type: lake
- Basin countries: United States
- Surface elevation: 1,667 ft (508 m)

Lake Badger is a lake in South Dakota, in the United States.

Lake Badger was named for the frequent badgers near it.

== See also ==
- List of lakes in South Dakota
