= Dry Lake (Hamlin County, South Dakota) =

Lake in the state of South Dakota, United States

- Location within South Dakota Location within the United States
- Location: Hamlin County, South Dakota
- Coordinates: 44.6282988°N 97.0561783°W
- Type: lake
- Surface elevation: 1,640 feet (500 m)

Dry Lake is a natural lake in South Dakota, in the United States.

Dry Lake received its name due to the tendency of the lake to run dry.

== See also ==
- List of lakes in South Dakota
