= Lake Emma (South Dakota) =

Lake in the state of South Dakota, United States

- Location within South Dakota Location within the United States
- Location: Marshall County, South Dakota
- Coordinates: 45.6845522°N 97.2316653°W
- Type: lake
- Surface elevation: 1,952 feet (595 m)

Lake Emma is a natural lake in the U.S. state of South Dakota.

According to a Native American legend, the lake bears the name of Emma Mato, a woman who repeatedly returned to the lake to search for her lover, who drowned there.

== See also ==
- List of lakes in South Dakota
