= Lake Iroquois (South Dakota) =

Lake in the state of South Dakota, United States

- Location within South Dakota
- Location: Kingsbury County, South Dakota
- Coordinates: 44°20′57″N 97°49′56″W
- Type: lake
- Basin countries: United States
- Surface elevation: 1,398 ft (426 m)

Lake Iroquois is a lake in South Dakota, in the United States.

Lake Iroquois takes its name from the city of Iroquois, South Dakota.

== See also ==
- List of lakes in South Dakota
