= Cottonwood Lake (Jerauld County, South Dakota) =

Lake in the state of South Dakota, United States

- Location within South Dakota Location within the United States
- Location: Jerauld County, South Dakota
- Coordinates: 44.1927927°N 98.7571033°W
- Type: lake
- Surface elevation: 1,857 feet (566 m)

Cottonwood Lake is a lake in South Dakota, in the United States.

The lake was so named on account of the cottonwood trees which grew there.

== See also ==
- List of lakes in South Dakota
