= Scotchman Lake =

Lake in the state of South Dakota, United States

- Location within South Dakota
- Location: Bennett County, South Dakota
- Coordinates: 43°00′20″N 101°28′18″W
- Type: lake
- Basin countries: United States
- Surface area: 100 acres (40 ha)
- Surface elevation: 3,205 ft (977 m)

Scotchman Lake is a natural lake in South Dakota, in the United States.

Scotchman Lake was named for the fact a local pioneer was a native of Scotland.

== See also ==
- List of lakes in South Dakota
