= Antelope Lake (Clark County, South Dakota) =

Lake in the state of South Dakota, United States

- Location within South Dakota Location within the United States
- Location: South Dakota
- Coordinates: 44.8311890°N 97.7231137°W
- Type: lake
- Surface elevation: 1,742 feet (531 m)

Antelope Lake is a lake in South Dakota, in the United States.

Antelope Lake was named for the frequent antelope near it in early days.

== See also ==
- List of lakes in South Dakota
