= Dry Lake (Esmeralda County, Nevada) =

- Location within Nevada Location within the United States
- Location: Esmeralda County, Nevada
- Coordinates: 38°20′10″N 117°47′23″W
- Type: Lake
- Surface elevation: 5,269 feet (1,606 m)

Dry Lake is a lake in the U.S. state of Nevada.

Dry Lake was named for the fact its bed most often is dry.
