= Lake Buffalo =

Lake in the state of South Dakota, United States

- Location within South Dakota Location within the United States
- Location: Ziebach County, South Dakota
- Coordinates: 44°37′21″N 101°59′29″W
- Basin countries: United States
- Surface elevation: 2,316 ft (706 m)

Lake Buffalo is a lake in the U.S. state of South Dakota. The elevation of the lake is 2316 feet.
