= Blue Dog Lake =

Lake in the state of South Dakota, United States

- Location within South Dakota
- Location: Day County, South Dakota
- Coordinates: 45°21′13″N 97°17′54″W
- Type: lake
- Basin countries: United States
- Surface elevation: 1,801 ft (549 m)

Blue Dog Lake is a lake in South Dakota, in the United States.

Blue Dog Lake has the name of an Indian chief who settled there.

== See also ==
- List of lakes in South Dakota
