= Lake Todd (South Dakota) =

Lake in the state of South Dakota, United States

- Location within South Dakota Location within the United States
- Location: Clark County, South Dakota
- Coordinates: 45.0523161°N 97.5538515°W
- Type: lake
- Surface elevation: 1,768 feet (539 m)

Lake Todd is a natural lake in South Dakota, in the United States.

Lake Todd has the name of the local Todd family which settled there.

== See also ==
- List of lakes in South Dakota
