= Lake City, South Dakota =

- Town
- Location in Marshall County and the state of South Dakota
- Coordinates: 45°43′30″N 97°24′50″W
- Country: United States
- State: South Dakota
- County: Marshall
- Incorporated: 1914

Area
  - Total: 0.23 sq mi (0.59 km^{2})
  - Land: 0.22 sq mi (0.57 km^{2})
  - Water: 0.0077 sq mi (0.02 km^{2})
- Elevation: 1,867 ft (569 m)

Population (2020)
  - Total: 45
  - Density: 205.0/sq mi (79.17/km^{2})
- Time zone: UTC-6 (Central (CST))
  - Summer (DST): UTC-5 (CDT)
- ZIP code: 57247
- Area code: 605
- FIPS code: 46-35220
- GNIS feature ID: 1267449

Lake City is a town in Marshall County, South Dakota, United States. The population was 45 at the 2020 census. Fort Sisseton Historic State Park, whose fort is listed on the National Register of Historic Places, is located nearby.

Lake City was laid out in 1914, and so named for the many lakes in the area.

== Geography ==
According to the United States Census Bureau, the town has a total area of 0.23 square miles (0.60 km^{2}), of which 0.22 square miles (0.57 km^{2}) is land and 0.01 square miles (0.03 km^{2}) is water.

== Demographics ==
Historical population
Census	Pop.	Note	%±
1930	162		—
1940	168		3.7%
1950	110		−34.5%
1960	81		−26.4%
1970	44		−45.7%
1980	46		4.5%
1990	43		−6.5%
2000	47		9.3%
2010	51		8.5%
2020	45		−11.8%
U.S. Decennial Census

=== 2010 census ===
As of the census of 2010, there were 51 people, 19 households, and 15 families residing in the town. The population density was 231.8 inhabitants per square mile (89.5/km^{2}). There were 29 housing units at an average density of 131.8 per square mile (50.9/km^{2}). The racial makeup of the town was 82.4% White, 7.8% Native American, and 9.8% Asian.

There were 19 households, of which 26.3% had children under the age of 18 living with them, 63.2% were married couples living together, 10.5% had a female householder with no husband present, 5.3% had a male householder with no wife present, and 21.1% were non-families. 21.1% of all households were made up of individuals, and 5.3% had someone living alone who was 65 years of age or older. The average household size was 2.68 and the average family size was 3.13.

The median age in the town was 48.2 years. 23.5% of residents were under the age of 18; 7.9% were between the ages of 18 and 24; 17.7% were from 25 to 44; 39.2% were from 45 to 64; and 11.8% were 65 years of age or older. The gender makeup of the town was 58.8% male and 41.2% female.

=== 2000 census ===
As of the census of 2000, there were 47 people, 19 households, and 9 families residing in the town. The population density was 216.5 people per square mile (83.6 people/km^{2}). There were 26 housing units at an average density of 119.8 per square mile (46.3/km^{2}). The racial makeup of the town was 100.00% White.

There were 19 households, out of which 36.8% had children under the age of 18 living with them, 47.4% were married couples living together, 5.3% had a female householder with no husband present, and 47.4% were non-families. 47.4% of all households were made up of individuals, and 31.6% had someone living alone who was 65 years of age or older. The average household size was 2.47 and the average family size was 3.80.

In the town, the population was spread out, with 36.2% under the age of 18, 23.4% from 25 to 44, 17.0% from 45 to 64, and 23.4% who were 65 years of age or older. The median age was 38 years. For every 100 females, there were 113.6 males. For every 100 females age 18 and over, there were 114.3 males.

The median income for a household in the town was $11,563, and the median income for a family was $63,125. Males had a median income of $38,750 versus $0 for females. The per capita income for the town was $14,036. There were no families and 8.0% of the population living below the poverty line, including no under eighteens and 22.2% of those over 64.
