= Henry, South Dakota =

- Town
- Logo

- Location in Codington County and the state of South Dakota
- Coordinates: 44°52′40″N 97°27′41″W
- Country: United States
- State: South Dakota
- County: Codington
- Incorporated: 1886

Area
  - Total: 1.45 sq mi (3.76 km^{2})
  - Land: 1.45 sq mi (3.76 km^{2})
  - Water: 0 sq mi (0.00 km^{2})
- Elevation: 1,811 ft (552 m)

Population (2020)
  - Total: 256
  - Density: 176.3/sq mi (68.07/km^{2})
- Time zone: UTC-6 (CST)
  - Summer (DST): UTC-5 (CDT)
- ZIP code: 57243
- Area code: 605
- FIPS code: 46-28140
- GNIS feature ID: 1267417
- Website: henrysd.com

Henry is a town in southwestern Codington County, South Dakota, United States. The population was 256 at the 2020 census. It is part of the Watertown, South Dakota Micropolitan Statistical Area.

== History ==
A post office called Henry has been in operation since 1879. Henry was platted in 1882. It was named for J. E. Henry, a pioneer settler.

== Geography ==
According to the United States Census Bureau, the town has a total area of 1.45 square miles (3.76 km^{2}), all land.

== Demographics ==
Historical population
Census	Pop.	Note	%±
1890	194		—
1900	191		−1.5%
1910	441		130.9%
1920	418		−5.2%
1930	358		−14.4%
1940	322		−10.1%
1950	323		0.3%
1960	276		−14.6%
1970	182		−34.1%
1980	217		19.2%
1990	215		−0.9%
2000	268		24.7%
2010	267		−0.4%
2020	256		−4.1%
2021 (est.)	262	▲	2.3%
U.S. Decennial Census; 2020 Census

=== 2010 census ===
As of the census of 2010, there were 267 people, 106 households, and 75 families residing in the town. The population density was 184.1 inhabitants per square mile (71.1/km^{2}). There were 123 housing units at an average density of 84.8 per square mile (32.7/km^{2}). The racial makeup of the town was 97.8% White, 0.4% African American, 0.7% Native American, and 1.1% from two or more races.

There were 106 households, of which 34.9% had children under the age of 18 living with them, 51.9% were married couples living together, 11.3% had a female householder with no husband present, 7.5% had a male householder with no wife present, and 29.2% were non-families. 24.5% of all households were made up of individuals, and 8.5% had someone living alone who was 65 years of age or older. The average household size was 2.52 and the average family size was 2.92.

The median age in the town was 39.4 years. 26.2% of residents were under the age of 18; 10.4% were between the ages of 18 and 24; 19.4% were from 25 to 44; 31.8% were from 45 to 64; and 12% were 65 years of age or older. The gender makeup of the town was 52.4% male and 47.6% female.

=== 2000 census ===
As of the census of 2000, there were 268 people, 101 households, and 71 families residing in the town. The population density was 185.3 inhabitants per square mile (71.5/km^{2}). There were 116 housing units at an average density of 80.2 per square mile (31.0/km^{2}). The racial makeup of the town was 98.88% White, 0.37% Native American, 0.75% from other races. Hispanic or Latino of any race were 1.87% of the population.

There were 101 households, out of which 37.6% had children under the age of 18 living with them, 57.4% were married couples living together, 9.9% had a female householder with no husband present, and 29.7% were non-families. 26.7% of all households were made up of individuals, and 9.9% had someone living alone who was 65 years of age or older. The average household size was 2.65 and the average family size was 3.28.

In the town, the population was spread out, with 28.7% under the age of 18, 8.6% from 18 to 24, 31.7% from 25 to 44, 21.3% from 45 to 64, and 9.7% who were 65 years of age or older. The median age was 32 years. For every 100 females, there were 111.0 males. For every 100 females age 18 and over, there were 103.2 males.

The median income for a household in the town was $36,607, and the median income for a family was $42,500. Males had a median income of $24,167 versus $25,750 for females. The per capita income for the town was $13,778. About 5.1% of families and 10.0% of the population were below the poverty line, including 10.0% of those under the age of eighteen and 38.5% of those 65 or over.

== Education ==
It is in the Henry School District 14-2.

== See also ==
- List of towns in South Dakota
