= Fort Sisseton =

- U.S. National Register of Historic Places
- U.S. Historic district
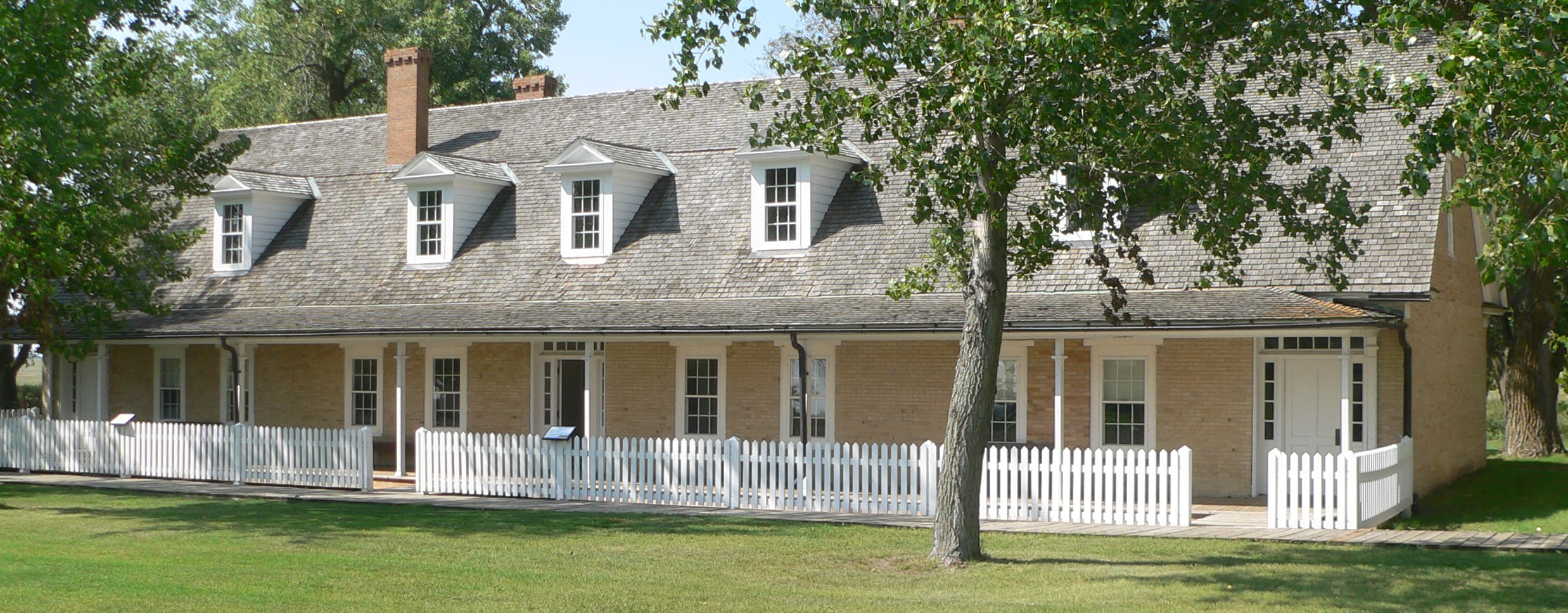
- Officers' quarters, photographed 2017

- Location within South Dakota Location within the United States
- Nearest city: Britton, South Dakota
- Coordinates: 45°39′28″N 97°31′50″W
- Area: 35 acres (14 ha)
- Built: 1864
- Website: Official website
- NRHP reference No.: 73001745
- Added to NRHP: May 10, 1973

Fort Sisseton near Britton, South Dakota, was established in 1864. As Fort Sisseton Historic State Park, it was designated as a State Historical Park in 1959. Fort Sisseton is listed on the U.S. National Register of Historic Places.

It has 14 of its original buildings remaining.

The fort with 35 acres (14 ha) was listed on the National Register in 1973. The listing included 15 contributing buildings and 9 contributing sites. Fort Sisseton State Park has a festival the first weekend of June each year with entertainment and reenacting of fort activities. It was used by the United States Army from 1864 to 1889 as an outpost inhabited by cavalry and infantry soldiers. Fort Sisseton was originally named Fort Wadsworth until it was changed to Fort Sisseton on August 29, 1876. The name was changed due to the fact a Fort Wadsworth already existed in New York, and to honor the Sisseton band of Sioux that provided scouts to the fort.

== Buffalo Soldiers at the Fort ==
Companies E and G of the 25th Infantry Regiment, an African-American unit, were both reassigned to Fort Sisseton in May 1884 after Fort Hale was abandoned. These companies remained until 1888 when they were reassigned elsewhere.

== See also ==
- List of South Dakota state parks
- List of the oldest buildings in South Dakota
