= National Register of Historic Places listings in McPherson County, South Dakota =

Location of McPherson County in South Dakota

This is a list of the National Register of Historic Places listings in McPherson County, South Dakota.

This is intended to be a complete list of the properties on the National Register of Historic Places in McPherson County, South Dakota, United States. The locations of National Register properties for which the latitude and longitude coordinates are included below, may be seen in a map.

There are 3 properties listed on the National Register in the county, and 3 former listings.

This National Park Service list is complete through NPS recent listings posted December 12, 2025.

== Current listings ==
	Name on the Register	Image	Date listed	Location	City or town	Description
1	Archeological Site No. 39MP3	Archeological Site No. 39MP3	August 6, 1993 (#93000795)	Address restricted	Long Lake	
2	McPherson County Courthouse	McPherson County Courthouse	November 3, 1986 (#86003020)	Highway 10; 45°43′24″N 98°56′22″W	Leola	
3	Peter Wittmayer House-Barn		August 13, 1984 (#84003344)	Southwestern quarter of the northwestern quadrant of Section 13, T127N, R71W; 45°49′17″N 99°21′37″W	Eureka	

== Former listings ==
	Name on the Register	Image	Date listed	Date removed	Location	City or town	Description
1	Eureka Lutheran College	Eureka Lutheran College	October 25, 1990 (#90001643)	December 28, 2000	301 Fourth St.	Eureka	
2	Amos Hoffman House		August 13, 1986 (#86001476)	September 9, 2021	Highway 10; 45°43′39″N 98°56′54″W	Leola	
3	Leola Post Office		June 22, 2005 (#05000627)	October 29, 2008	741 Sherman Street	Leola	old post office demolished, new post office built across street

== See also ==
- List of National Historic Landmarks in South Dakota
- National Register of Historic Places listings in South Dakota
