= Mound (disambiguation) =

A mound is an artificial heap or pile, especially of earth, rocks, or sand.

Mound and Mounds may also refer to:

== Places ==
- Mound, Louisiana, United States
- Mound, Minnesota, United States
- Mound, Texas, United States
- Mound, West Virginia
- Mound Creek, a stream in Minnesota
- Mounds, Illinois, United States
- Mounds, Oklahoma, United States
- Mound City (disambiguation)
- Mound Township (disambiguation)
- The Mound, a street in Edinburgh, Scotland, linking the Old Town and the New Town
- The Mound railway station, a former station in northern Scotland

== Arts, entertainment, and media ==
- Mound, a fictional entity in the work of artist Trenton Doyle Hancock
- The Mound (novella), a 1940 work by H. P. Lovecraft

== Archaeology ==
- Earthworks (archaeology) – General term to describe artificial changes in land level in history and pre-history
- Platform mound – Earthwork or mound intended to support a structure or activity
- tumulus – Mound of earth and stones raised over graves
- Barrow (archaeology) or kurgan – burial mounds, and other archaeological earthworks, commonly, "long barrows" and "round barrows"

== Other uses ==
- The Mound or Marble Arch Mound, former artificial hill in London
- Mound Laboratories, a nuclear laboratory in Miamisburg, Ohio that was a part of the Manhattan Project
- Mounds (candy), a candy bar
- Pitcher's mound, a raised surface on a baseball diamond from which pitches are thrown

== See also ==
- Mound builder (disambiguation)
