= South Dakota Highway 45 =

State highway in South Dakota, United States

Highway 45

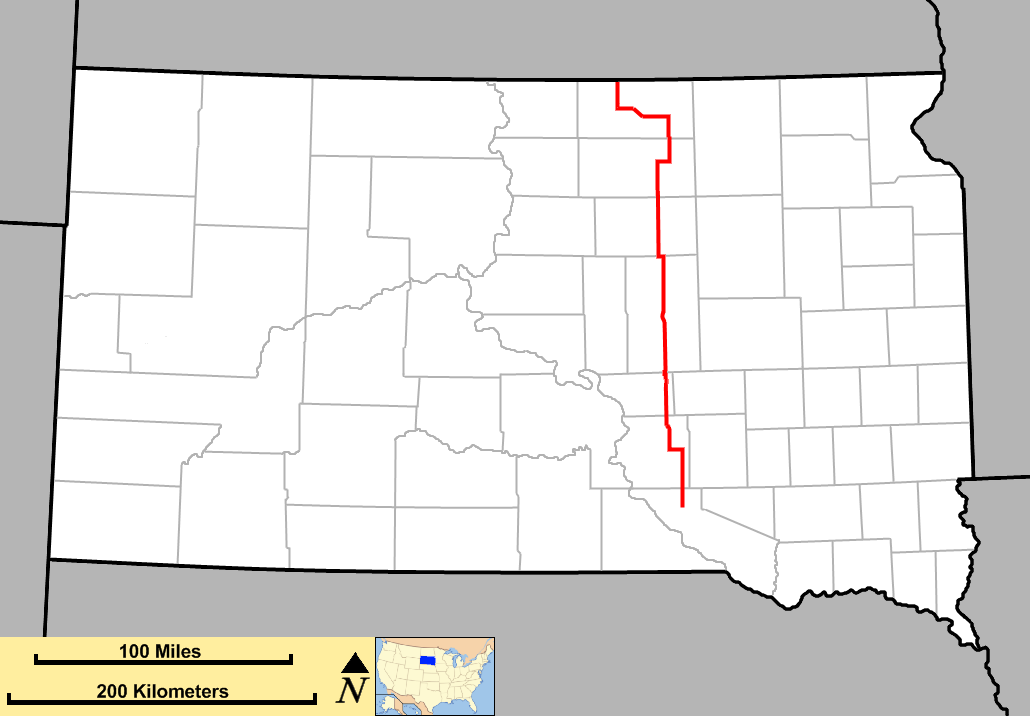
- Route of SD 45 (in red)

Route information
- Maintained by SDDOT
- Length: 198 mi (319 km)
- Existed: 1927–present

Major junctions
- South end: SD 44 / SD 50 in Platte
- I-90 in Kimball; US 14 in Miller; US 212 near Faulkton; SD 20 near Cresbard; US 12 in Ipswich
- North end: ND 3 near Ashley

Location
- Country: United States
- State: South Dakota
- Counties: Charles Mix; Brule; Buffalo; Hand; Faulk; Edmunds; McPherson

Highway system
- South Dakota State Trunk Highway System; Interstate; US; State
← SD 44	→ SD 46

South Dakota Highway 45 is a state highway that runs north to south across much of central South Dakota, United States. The northern terminus is at the North Dakota border as a continuation of North Dakota Highway 3, and runs south to South Dakota Highway 44 and South Dakota Highway 50 at Platte. It is 198 miles (319 km) in length.

== History ==
SD 45 was established around 1927. The southern terminus was at the intersection of present-day SD 50 and County Road 49 (CR 49) and the northern terminus was at the intersection of SD 10 in Leola.

By 1932, it was extended south along what was part of SD 47 to Wheeler. By 1936, SD 45 was truncated at Kimball, at US 16, as US 281 supplanted the SD 45 designation to the south. In the early 1950s, when US 281 was relocated several miles to the east, SD 45 was extended back south to SD 50.

Around 1970, SD 50 had been realigned to intersect SD 44 west of Platte, and SD 45 was extended south along the old alignment to Platte, where it remains today.

The north end of the route has remained in its current configuration since 1936.

== Major intersections ==
County	Location	mi	km	Destinations	Notes
Charles Mix	Platte	27.00	43.45	SD 44 / SD 50 – Winner	Southern terminus
Brule		51.59	83.03	I-90 east – Mitchell	Eastern end of I-90 concurrency, Exit 289.
Brule	Kimball	56.79	91.39	I-90 west – Rapid City	Western end of I-90 concurrency, Exit 284.
Buffalo		81.10	130.52	SD 34 – Wessington Springs	
Hand	Miller	111.54	179.51	US 14 east – St. Lawrence	Southern end of US 14 concurrency
Hand	Miller	112.35	180.81	US 14 west – Pierre	Northern end of US 14 concurrency
Hand		128.61	206.98	SD 26 east	Southern end of SD 26 concurrency
Hand		129.61	208.59	SD 26 west	Northern end of SD 26 concurrency
Hand–Faulk county line		137.72	221.64	US 212 east – Redfield	Southern end of US 212 concurrency
Faulk		148.69	239.29	US 212 west – Faulkton	Northern end of US 212 concurrency
Faulk		157.34	253.21	SD 20 east – Northville	Southern end of SD 20 concurrency
Faulk		159.32	256.40	SD 20 west – Onaka	Northern end of SD 20 concurrency
Edmunds	Ipswich	177.74	286.04	US 12 west – Roscoe	Western end of US 12 concurrency
Edmunds		182.68	293.99	US 12 east – Aberdeen	Eastern end of US 12 concurrency
McPherson	Leola	201.78	324.73	SD 10 east – Britton	Eastern end of SD 10 concurrency
McPherson		210.14	338.19	SD 239 north – Long Lake	Southern terminus of SD 239
McPherson		224.05	360.57	SD 10 west / SD 247 south	Northern terminus of SD 247; western end of SD 10 concurrency
McPherson		236.10	379.97	ND 3 north – Ashley	Continuation into North Dakota
1.000 mi = 1.609 km; 1.000 km = 0.621 mi: Concurrency terminus

== See also ==
- List of state highways in South Dakota
