= Hoffman House =

Hoffman House, Hoffman Barn, or Hoffman Hotel may refer to:

in the United States

- Hoffman Barn (Paris, Idaho), NRHP-listed in Bear Lake County
- Hoffman Building, Davenport, Iowa, NRHP-listed in Scott County
- Samuel Hoffman, Jr., House, Davenport, Iowa, NRHP-listed in Scott County
- Phil Hoffman House, Oskaloosa, Iowa, NRHP-listed in Mahaska County
- Hoffman Hotel (South Bend, Indiana), NRHP-listed in St. Joseph County
- Kouns-Hoffman House, Greenup, Kentucky, NRHP-listed in Greenup County
- Hoffman House (Lancaster, Kentucky), NRHP-listed in Lincoln County
- Hoffman Farm, Keedysville, Maryland, NRHP-listed in Washington County
- Isaac Hoffman House, Houcksville, Maryland, NRHP-listed in Carroll County
- Charles Hoffman House, Hamilton, Montana, NRHP-listed in Ravalli County
- Bray–Hoffman House, Annandale, New Jersey, NRHP-listed in Hunterdon County
- Hoffman House (Poughkeepsie, New York), NRHP-listed in Dutchess County
- Hoffman-Bowers-Josey-Riddick House, Scotland Neck, North Carolina, NRHP-listed in Halifax County
- Von Hoffman House, Medora, North Dakota, NRHP-listed in Billings County
- Hoffman House (Crestline, Ohio), NRHP-listed in Crawford County
- George Hoffman House, West Whiteland, Pennsylvania, NRHP-listed in Chester County
- George P. Hoffman House, Blythewood, South Carolina, NRHP-listed in Richland County
- Amos Hoffman House, Leola, South Dakota, NRHP-listed in McPherson County
- Hoffman Barn (Revillo, South Dakota), NRHP-listed in Deuel County
- Hoffman House (Yankton, South Dakota), NRHP-listed in Yankton County
- Smith-Hoffman House, Clarksville, Tennessee, NRHP-listed in Montgomery County
- Hoffman House Hotel, Port Washington, Wisconsin, NRHP-listed in Ozaukee County
