= South Dakota Highway 239 =

State highway in South Dakota, United States

Highway 239
- SD 239 highlighted in red

Route information
- Maintained by SDDOT
- Length: 7.312 mi (11.768 km)

Major junctions
- South end: SD 10 / SD 45 near Eureka
- North end: 106th Street in Long Lake

Location
- Country: United States
- State: South Dakota
- Counties: McPherson

Highway system
- South Dakota State Trunk Highway System; Interstate; US; State
← SD 235	→ SD 240

South Dakota Highway 239 (SD 239) is a 7.312-mile-long (11.768 km) state highway located entirely within McPherson County, South Dakota. Its southern terminus is at an intersection with SD 10/SD 45. This terminus is located about 12 miles (19 km) west-northwest of Leola and about 19.7 miles (31.7 km) east-southeast of Eureka. Its northern terminus is at 106th Street in the small community of Long Lake.

== Route description ==
SD 239 begins at an intersection with SD 10 / SD 45 south of Long Lake. Here, the roadway continues to the south as 350th Avenue. It travels to the north. Approximately 3–4 miles (4.8–6.4 km) later, SD 239 curves slightly east to bypass a small lake. It then curves back to the west and straightens out to a due north course for the last 3 miles (4.8 km) before it terminates at 106th Street on the south side of Long Lake. SD 239 then becomes 350th Avenue after this terminus, which continues to the North Dakota state line.

== Major intersections ==
The entire route is in McPherson County.

Location	mi	km	Destinations	Notes
	0.000	0.000	SD 10 / SD 45 / 350th Avenue south – Leola, Eureka	Southern terminus; roadway continues as 350th Avenue.
Long Lake	7.312	11.768	106th Street / 350th Avenue north	Northern terminus; roadway continues as 350th Avenue.
1.000 mi = 1.609 km; 1.000 km = 0.621 mi
