= South Dakota Highway 10 =

State highway in South Dakota, United States

Highway 10

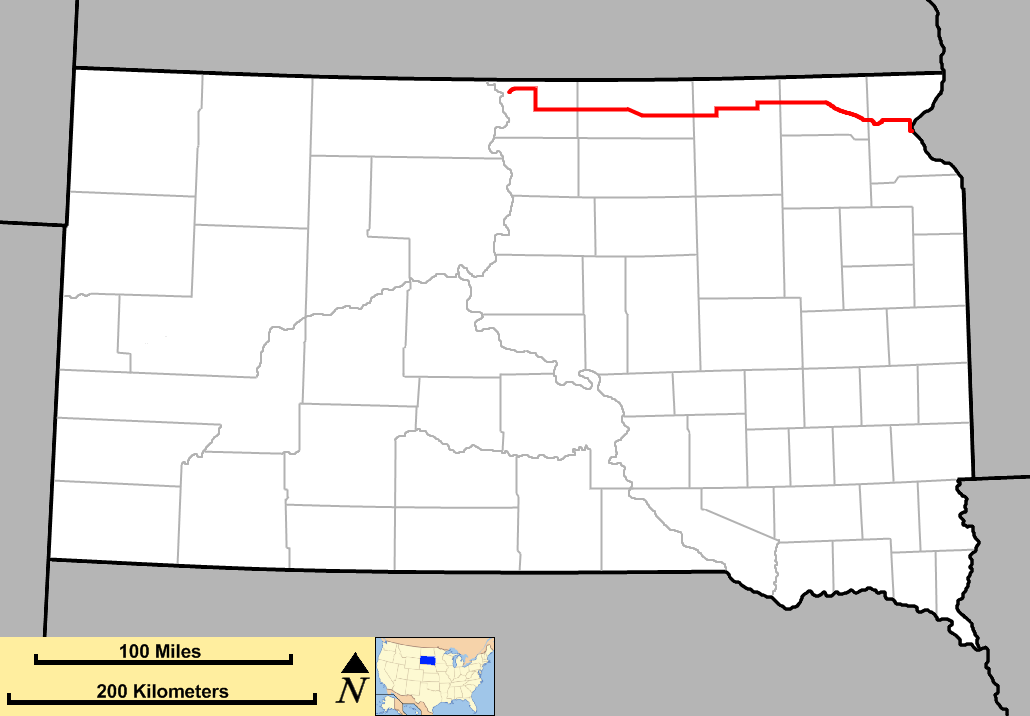
- Map of South Dakota with SD 10 in red

Route information
- Maintained by SDDOT
- Length: 175.945 mi (283.156 km)
- Existed: 1927–present

Major junctions
- West end: SD 1804 in Pollock
- US 83 from north of Herreid to north of Mound City; SD 47 in Eureka; SD 45 from east of Eureka to Leola; US 281 near Barnard; SD 25 near Lake City; SD 127 in Sisseton; I-29 / US 81 east of Sisseton
- East end: MN 28 at the Minnesota state line southeast of Sisseton

Location
- Country: United States
- State: South Dakota
- Counties: Campbell; McPherson; Brown; Marshall; Roberts

Highway system
- South Dakota State Trunk Highway System; Interstate; US; State
← SD 9	→ SD 11

South Dakota Highway 10 (SD 10) is a 175.945-mile (283.156 km) state highway in the north-central and northeastern portions of South Dakota, United States. It connects SD 1804 in Pollock with the Minnesota state line southeast of Sisseton.

SD 10 was formerly the "Glacier Trail", and used to be designated as South Dakota Highway 12 (SD 12).

== Route description ==
=== Campbell County ===
SD 10 begins at an intersection with SD 1804 in the south-central part of Pollock. It travels to the east on Main Street. After leaving the city limits of Pollock, the highway curves to the northeast and crosses over part of Lake Pocasse. It passes the Pocassee National Wildlife Refuge and curves to the east-southeast. It then heads nearly due east to an intersection with U.S. Route 83 (US 83) north of Herreid. The two highways travel concurrently to the south. They pass the Herreid Livestock Market and the Herreid Municipal Airport and then enters the city limits of Herreid. South of the city, they cross over Spring Creek. They travel just to the west of McClarem Lake and then intersect 112th Street. At this intersection, SD 10 splits off to the east. After an intersection with SD 271 (319th Avenue), the highway enters the west-central part of McPherson County.

=== McPherson County ===
SD 10 travels just north of some sewage disposal ponds and just south of Eureka Lake and then has an intersection with SD 47 and the southern terminus of County Road 3 (CR 3; both are parts of 327th Avenue). At this intersection, SD 10 and SD 47 travel concurrently and they enter Eureka. The highways travel just south of an eastern part of Eureka Lake. An intersection with 7th Street leads to the business district of the city. At 328th Avenue, SD 47 splits off to the north, and SD 10 continues to the east. It travels just south of the Rosenthal, Neuharth, Pfeiffle, Morlocks Slough, Odessa Number 2, and Odessa Number 1 state public shooting areas. Then, it has an intersection with SD 45 and the northern terminus of SD 247 (both parts of 341st Avenue). Here, SD 10 and SD 45 travel concurrently to the east. They skirt along the northern edge of the Highway 10 State Public Shooting Area. They travel north of the Moscow State Public Shooting Area and then curve to the southeast. They intersect the southern terminus of SD 239 (350th Avenue). SD 10 and SD 45 curve back to the east. Approximately 10 miles (16 km) later, they enter Leola. SD 45 splits off to the south onto Mason Street. This intersection is also the southern terminus of CR 19 (363rd Avenue). SD 10 continues to the east and, at an intersection with 373rd Avenue, enters the northwestern part of Brown County.

=== Brown County ===
SD 10 travels just north of Willow Creek Lake and crosses over Elm River before it intersects US 281 (386th Avenue) southwest of Barnard. The two highways travel concurrently to the north, while the roadway continues as 115th Street. At an intersection with 112th Street, SD 10 splits off to the east. It passes the Sand Lake National Wildlife Refuge and crosses over Sand Lake before traveling through Houghton. The highway curves to the north onto 403rd Avenue and then back to the east onto 110th Street. At 404th Avenue, it intersects SD 37. The two highways travel concurrently to the east for approximately 2 miles (3.2 km), splitting at 406th Avenue. SD 10 continues its eastward path. At an intersection with the southern terminus of 412th Avenue, the highway enters the west-central part of Marshall County.

=== Marshall County ===
SD 10 travels through West Britton before entering Britton. At Main Street, SD 27 begins a concurrency with SD 10. They cross over some railroad tracks of BNSF Railway. At an intersection with the northern terminus of 429th Avenue, SD 27 splits to the north. Then, SD 10 curves to the southeast and then travels through an area that has a lot of lakes. It travels just south of Sixmile Lake and then just south of Cottonwood Lake. Just south-southeast of the appropriately-named Lake City, the highway begins a concurrency with SD 25. This concurrency is just under 3/4 mile (1.2 km). SD 10 continues to the southeast, just northeast of Clear Lake. It then slips between North Red Iron Lake and South Red Iron Lake. The highway curves back to the east and enters the northwestern part of Roberts County.

=== Roberts County ===
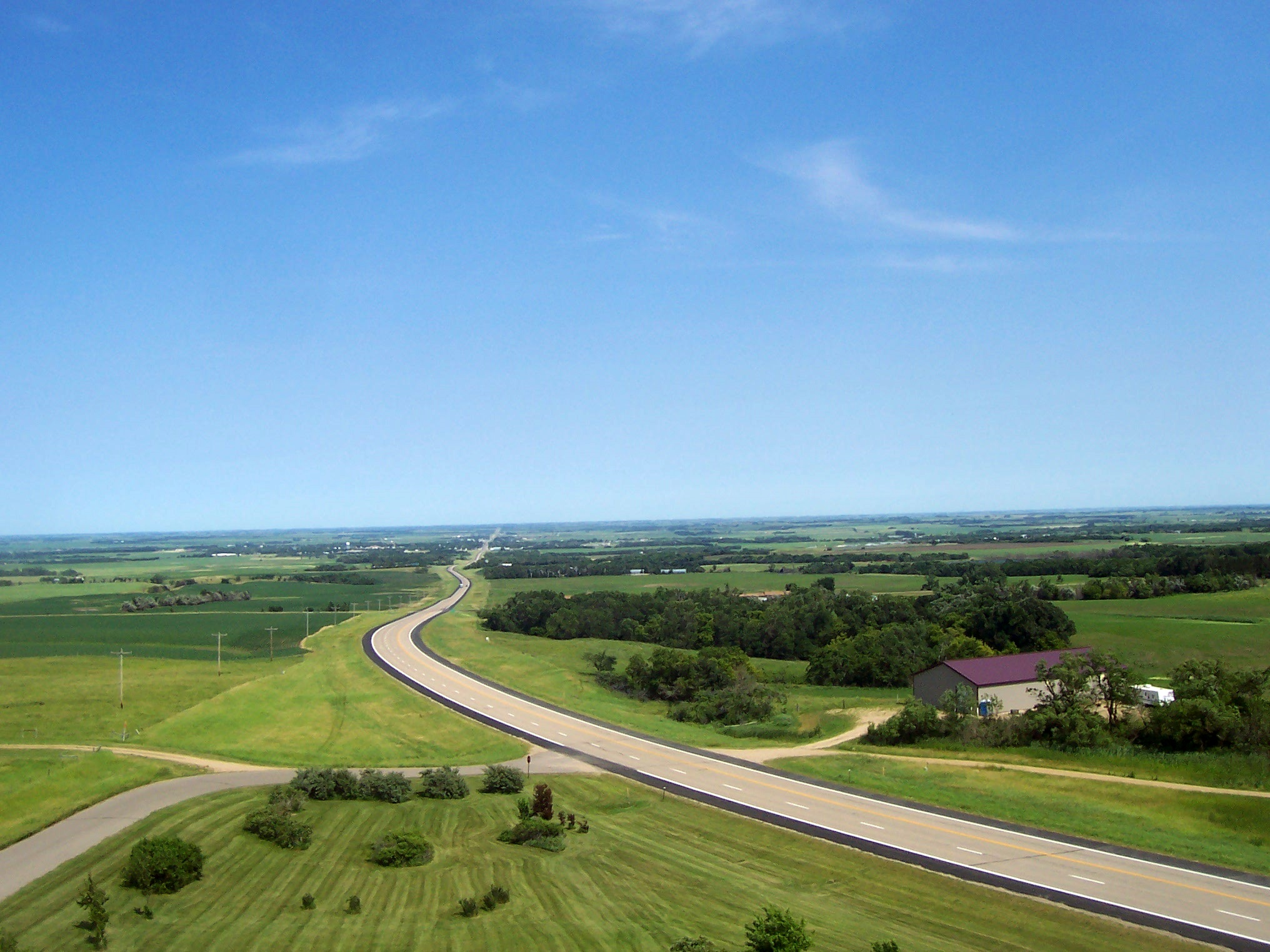
SD 10, near Sisseton in Roberts County, June 2007

SD 10 continues in a relatively eastward direction and enters Sisseton. It travels just north of the Coteau des Prairies Hospital and then crosses over some railroad tracks of BNSF Railway. Just before leaving the city limits of Sisseton, SD 10 meets the southern terminus of SD 127 (459th Avenue). The highway travels just south of the Sisseton Municipal Airport just before an interchange with I-29/US 81. It then crosses over the Little Minnesota River. After a curve to the south and then to the southeast, it reaches its eastern terminus at the Minnesota state line. Here, the roadway continues as Minnesota State Highway 28 (MN 28).

== History ==
SD 10 was formerly the "Glacier Trail". It was also formerly known as South Dakota Highway 12. The highway was redesignated in 1927, presumably to avoid confusion with nearby US 12.

The segment of the highway west of US 83 was added in the early 1960s.

== Major intersections ==
County	Location	mi	km	Destinations	Notes
Campbell	Pollock	0.000	0.000	SD 1804	Western terminus
Campbell		10.724	17.259	US 83 north – Linton	Western end of US 83 concurrency
Campbell		19.804	31.871	US 83 south / 112th Street west – Mound City	Eastern end of US 83 concurrency; roadway continues as 112th Street.
Campbell		27.763	44.680	SD 271 (319th Avenue) – Java, Artas	
McPherson	Eureka	31.750	51.097	SD 47 south (327th Avenue) – Bowdle, City Park	Western end of SD 47 concurrency; southern terminus of County Road 3 (CR 3; 327th Avenue)
McPherson	Eureka	32.794	52.777	SD 47 north (328th Avenue) – ND state line	Eastern end of SD 47 concurrency
McPherson		49.722	80.020	SD 45 north / SD 247 south (341st Avenue) – Ashley ND, Roscoe	Western end of SD 45 concurrency; northern terminus of SD 247
McPherson		58.761	94.567	SD 239 north (350th Avenue) – Long Lake	Southern terminus of SD 239
McPherson	Leola	66.925	107.705	SD 45 south (Mason Street) – US 12	Eastern end of SD 45 concurrency; southern terminus of CR 19 (363rd Avenue)
Brown		86.742	139.598	US 281 south (386th Avenue) / 115th Street east – Aberdeen	Western end of US 281 concurrency; roadway continues as 115th Street.
Brown		87.742	141.207	US 281 north (386th Avenue) / 112th Street west – Frederick	Eastern end of US 281 concurrency; roadway continues as 112th Street.
Brown		106.644	171.627	SD 37 north (404th Avenue) – Hecla	Western end of SD 37 concurrency
Brown		108.737	174.995	SD 37 south (406th Avenue) – Groton	Eastern end of SD 37 concurrency
Marshall	Britton	125.656	202.224	SD 27 south (Main Street) – Museum	Western end of SD 27 concurrency; connection to Britton Municipal Airport
Marshall		131.624	211.828	SD 27 north / 429th Avenue south – Forman ND	Eastern end of SD 27 concurrency; northern terminus of 429th Avenue
Marshall	Lake City	143.925	231.625	SD 25 south – Eden, Webster	Western end of SD 25 concurrency
Marshall		144.672	232.827	SD 25 north – Veblen	Eastern end of SD 25 concurrency
Roberts	Sisseton	164.976	265.503	SD 127 north (459th Avenue) – Hammer	Southern terminus of SD 127
Roberts		166.454– 166.721	267.882– 268.311	I-29 / US 81 – Watertown, New Effington	I-29/US 81 exit 232
Roberts		175.945	283.156	MN 28 east / Minnesota River Valley Scenic Byway – Browns Valley	Eastern terminus; continuation into Minnesota
1.000 mi = 1.609 km; 1.000 km = 0.621 mi: Concurrency terminus

== See also ==
- List of state highways in South Dakota
