= South Dakota Highway 253 =

State highway in South Dakota, United States

Highway 253

Route information
- Maintained by SDDOT
- Length: 18.024 mi (29.007 km)
- Existed: 1975–present

Major junctions
- South end: US 12 west of Roscoe
- North end: SD 47 west of Hosmer

Location
- Country: United States
- State: South Dakota
- Counties: Edmunds

Highway system
- South Dakota State Trunk Highway System; Interstate; US; State
← SD 251	→ SD 258

South Dakota Highway 253 (SD 253) is an 18.024-mile-long (29.007 km) state highway in the north-central part of the U.S. state of South Dakota. It exists entirely within Edmunds County, from U.S. Route 12 (US 12) west of Roscoe to SD 47 north of Bowdle. The route is maintained by the South Dakota Department of Transportation (SDDOT) and is not a part of the National Highway System.

== Route description ==
SD 253 begins at an intersection with US 12 near Gretna and heads north through flat farmland. It passes a railroad almost immediately and continues north. The route passes by a couple of lakes and turns west. Directly after turning east, SD 253 enters the city of Hosmer. After running through the city, the highway passes by a cemetery and treks west. The route reaches its northern terminus approximately eight miles (13 km) west of Hosmer at an intersection with SD 47.

SD 253 is maintained by SDDOT. In 2012, the traffic on the road was measured in average annual daily traffic. The highway had an average of 214 vehicles on the north–south segment and an average of 195 vehicles on the east–west segment.

== Major intersections ==
The entire route is in Edmunds County.

Location	mi	km	Destinations	Notes
Cottonwood Lake–Glen township line	0.000	0.000	US 12 / 336th Avenue – Selby, Ipswich	Southern terminus of SD 253; northern terminus of CR 5
Modena Township	18.024	29.007	SD 47 (326th Avenue) / 125th Street – Bowdle, Eureka	Northern terminus of SD 253; eastern terminus of CR 2W
1.000 mi = 1.609 km; 1.000 km = 0.621 mi
