= Eureka Municipal Airport =

Eureka Municipal Airport may refer to:

- Eureka Municipal Airport (California), an airport serving Eureka, California, United States (FAA: O33)
- Eureka Municipal Airport (Kansas), an airport serving Eureka, Kansas, United States (FAA: 13K)
- Eureka Municipal Airport (South Dakota), an airport serving Eureka, South Dakota, United States (FAA: 3W8)

== See also ==
- Eureka Airport (disambiguation)
