= Mound City and Eastern Railway =

The Mound City and Eastern Railway was a small, short-lived railroad that operated in McPherson County, South Dakota. The railroad was conceived by local farmers and commercial interests in the early twentieth century as part of a plan to provide rail access to the small town of Mound City, South Dakota. The 70-mile projected route of the railway extended eastward from Mound City to the town of Leola, South Dakota, where a connection could be made with the Minneapolis and St. Louis Railway. A competitive connection was planned, along the line at Eureka, South Dakota, with the Chicago, Milwaukee, St. Paul and Pacific Railroad.

Work on the Mound City & Eastern began in 1929, when 18 miles of trackage were completed running northwest from Leola to the new townsite of Long Lake. Financial difficulties ended work at Long Lake, however, and the remainder of the line was never built. Initially, the company operated conventional trains pulled by steam locomotives, but by the 1930s limited financial resources and a lack of traffic forced the railroad to resort to "a curious gasoline engine contraption capable of dragging five or six cars over spindly former interurban rail, making two or three trips a week except in winter, when the road frequently shut down."

The Mound City & Eastern was abandoned in 1940. Substantial portions of the old railway grade remain evident today.
