= Mehlhaff =

Mehlhaff or Mehlhoff is a surname. It is a toponymic surname of North German origin, meaning a person who lives on or owns a marshy farm. It is derived from the Middle Low German words mel (mud) and hoff (farmstead, manor farm).

== People with the surname ==
- Jim Mehlhaff, American politician from South Dakota
- Taylor Mehlhaff (born 1985), American football player
- Daniela Mehlhaff (born 1996), German acrobatic gymnast
- Dean O. Mehlhaff (1927–2016), American politician from South Dakota
- Robert Mehlhoff (born 1947), American politician from Montana
