= Eureka Airport =

Eureka Airport may refer to:

- Eureka Aerodrome in Eureka, Nunavut, Canada
- Eureka Airport (Nevada) in Eureka, Nevada, United States
- Arcata-Eureka Airport, a commercial airport serving Arcata & Eureka, California, United States
- Eureka Municipal Airport (California), a general-aviation airport serving Eureka, California, United States (FAA: O33)
- Eureka Municipal Airport (Kansas), an airport serving Eureka, Kansas, United States (FAA: 13K)
- Eureka Municipal Airport (South Dakota), an airport serving Eureka, South Dakota, United States (FAA: 3W8)

== See also ==
- Eureka Municipal Airport (disambiguation)
