= South Dakota Highway 247 =

State highway in South Dakota, United States

Highway 247

Route information
- Maintained by SDDOT
- Length: 23.023 mi (37.052 km)
- Existed: 1975–present

Major junctions
- South end: US 12 in Roscoe
- North end: SD 10 / SD 45 east of Eureka

Location
- Country: United States
- State: South Dakota
- Counties: Edmunds, McPherson

Highway system
- South Dakota State Trunk Highway System; Interstate; US; State
← SD 244	→ SD 248

South Dakota Highway 247 (SD 247) is a short state highway running from Roscoe to an intersection with SD 10 and SD 45 east of Eureka. The route is just more than 23 miles in length.

== Route description ==
SD 247 begins at the corner of Mitchell Street and Merrill Avenue in Roscoe. The route begins north from this intersection and leaves Roscoe, passing by a cemetery about a mile north of the city. Nine miles north of the cemetery, at the Edmunds–McPherson county line, SD 247 curves northwest. After heading in this direction for about half of a mile, the highway curves north again. Two miles north of this curve, SD 247 passes by another cemetery. Four miles north of this cemetery, the route turns west for one mile. After turning back to the north, the highway continues for six miles before ending at an intersection with SD 10 and SD 45. Continuing north or turning east at this intersection directs one onto SD 45, while turning either east or west directs one onto SD 10.

== Major intersections ==
County	Location	mi	km	Destinations	Notes
Edmunds	Roscoe	0.000	0.000	US 12 (Merrill Avenue) / Mitchell Street south – Aberdeen	Southern terminus; roadway continues as Mitchell Street.
McPherson		23.023	37.052	SD 10 (112th Street) / SD 45 (341st Avenue) – Eureka, Ashley, Leola	Northern terminus
1.000 mi = 1.609 km; 1.000 km = 0.621 mi
