= Clear Lake, Marshall County, South Dakota =

Clear Lake, South Dakota
- Census-designated place
- Location within South Dakota Location within the United States
- Coordinates: 45°41′36″N 97°21′26″W
- Country: United States
- State: South Dakota
- County: Marshall

Area
  - Total: 2.80 sq mi (7.26 km^{2})
  - Land: 0.98 sq mi (2.53 km^{2})
  - Water: 1.83 sq mi (4.73 km^{2})
- Elevation: 1,821 ft (555 m)

Population (2020)
  - Total: 170
  - Density: 174.1/sq mi (67.22/km^{2})
- Time zone: UTC-6 (Central (CST))
  - Summer (DST): UTC-5 (CDT)
- ZIP Code: 57247 (Lake City)
- Area code: 605
- FIPS code: 46-12640
- GNIS feature ID: 2807114

Clear Lake is an unincorporated community and census-designated place (CDP) in Marshall County, South Dakota, United States, surrounding a natural lake of the same name. Within the Lake Traverse Indian Reservation, it was first listed as a CDP prior to the 2020 census. The population was 170 at the 2020 census.

It is in the southeast part of the county, bordered to the northeast by South Dakota Highway 10, which leads northwest 4 miles (6 km) to Lake City and southeast 16 miles (26 km) to Sisseton.

== Demographics ==
Historical population
Census	Pop.	Note	%±
2020	170		—
U.S. Decennial Census
