= McPherson County Courthouse =

McPherson County Courthouse may refer to:

- McPherson County Courthouse (Kansas), McPherson, Kansas
- McPherson County Courthouse (South Dakota), Leola, South Dakota
