= Red Iron Lake =

Lake in the state of South Dakota, United States

- Location within South Dakota
- Interactive map of Red Iron Lake
- Location: Marshall County, South Dakota
- Coordinates: North Red Iron Lake: 45.6901°N 97.3232°W; South Red Iron Lake: 45.6718°N 97.3184°W
- Type: Lakes
- Etymology: Chief Red Iron
- Part of: Clear and Red Iron Lakes Sub-watershed
- Primary inflows: South and North Buffalo Lakes
- Primary outflows: North Red Iron: Clear Lake; South Red Iron: North Red Iron
- Surface area: North Red Iron Lake: 100 acres (40 ha); South Red Iron Lake: 610 acres (250 ha)
- Average depth: 8 ft (2.4 m)
- Max. depth: 15 ft (4.6 m)
- Surface elevation: 1,828 ft (557 m)

Red Iron Lake is a natural lake group in Marshall County, South Dakota, in the United States. It consists of North Red Iron Lake and South Red Iron Lake.

Both lakes are regularly stocked with several species of fish, including black bullhead, northern pike, and yellow perch and sport fish such as walleye, black bass (i.e., largemouth and smallmouth bass), and panfish (e.g., bluegill). South Red Iron Lake is managed as a northern pike, walleye and yellow perch fishery.

== Etymology ==
Red Iron Lake has the name of a Native American chieftain. The name of the lakes is derived from a theory that the name of this chieftain was Máza Ṡa (Red Iron), but in the Treaty of Traverse des Sioux his name is recorded as "Sounding Iron" or Máza S'a.

== See also ==
- List of lakes in South Dakota
