= List of former state highways in South Dakota =

- Standard South Dakota highway shields

System information
- Notes: South Dakota highways are generally state-maintained.

Highway names
- Interstates: Interstate X (I-X)
- US Highways: U.S. Highway X (US X)
- State: (State) Highway X (SD X)

System links
- South Dakota State Trunk Highway System; Interstate; US; State

The following is a list of former state highways in South Dakota. These roads are now either parts of other routes or no longer carry a route number.

== Highway 8 ==
Highway 8
- Location: Montana state line – Mobridge
- Length: 180 mi (290 km)
- Existed: 1935–c. 1968

South Dakota Highway 8 was one of only two single digit state highway numbers known to be used in South Dakota. It was a state route across north central and northwest South Dakota, generally following what is now South Dakota Highway 20. The first designation of this route, in 1926, was South Dakota Highway 18. By the late 1920s, U.S. Highway 18 was established across southern South Dakota. The existence of two highway 18's was corrected around 1935, when the northern highway was redesignated as South Dakota 8. This number remained in use until the late 1960s, when SD 20 was extended west across the Missouri River, absorbing the SD 8 alignment.

Browse numbered routes
← SD 1806	SD	→ SD 9

== Highway 9 ==
South Dakota Highway 9 was a designation that was used twice.

Highway 9
- Existed: 1926–1927

This road went from Minnesota west to Sioux Falls. When the U.S. highway system was implemented in 1926, the road was designated as part of U.S. Highway 16. After a short period of dual signage, the SD 9 designation was dropped.

Highway 9
- Location: Marshall County
- Length: 10 mi (16 km)
- Existed: 1935–1950

South Dakota Highway 9 was a short state route in Marshall County. It was one of only two known single digit state highway numbers used in South Dakota. When highways were first numbered in the 1920s, this route was the northern end of South Dakota Highway 25. Around 1935, that route was realigned east from Britton to what is now South Dakota Highway 27. The old route became Highway 9, and linked up with the corresponding North Dakota Highway 9. SD 9 was dropped around 1950, and is currently unnumbered.

Browse numbered routes
← SD 8	SD	→ SD 10

== Highway 12 ==
Highway 12
- Location: Mound City – Minnesota
- Length: 325 mi (523 km)
- Existed: 1926–1927

South Dakota Highway 12 was a state route that ran across north central and northeast South Dakota. South Dakota 12 was one of the numbers assigned to the Glacier Trail. In 1926, U.S. Highway 12 was implemented, and ran 15 or 20 miles (32 km) to the south (US 12 was South Dakota 16 before that). Because the two Highway 12 routes were so close, the state highway was redesignated as South Dakota Highway 10 in 1927.

Browse numbered routes
← US 12	SD	→ SD 13

== Highway 16 ==
Highway 16
- Location: White Butte – Big Stone City
- Length: 330 mi (530 km)
- Existed: 1926–1927

South Dakota Highway 16 was a state route running across much of northern South Dakota. South Dakota 16 was designated in the 1920s, as a number for the Yellowstone Trail across the state. When the U.S. highway system was implemented in 1926, this road was designated as part of U.S. Highway 12. After a short period of dual signage, the SD 16 designation was dropped.

Browse numbered routes
← US 16	SD	→ SD 16B

== Highway 18 ==
Highway 18
- Location: Montana–Mobridge
- Length: 200 mi (320 km)
- Existed: 1926–c. 1935

South Dakota Highway 18 was a state route located in northwest and north central South Dakota. South Dakota 18 was first designated in the mid-1920s, running from the Montana border to near Mobridge. Shortly afterward, U.S. Highway 18 was implemented across the southern portion of the state. The northern highway 18 was redesignated as South Dakota Highway 8 around 1935. It is currently part of South Dakota Highway 20.

Browse numbered routes
← US 18	SD	→ SD 19

== Highway 24 ==
Highway 24
- Location: Belle Fourche–Faith
- Length: 148 mi (238 km)
- Existed: 1926–February 1961

South Dakota Highway 24 was a state route located in west central and northwest South Dakota. When initially established in the mid-1920s, the western terminus of South Dakota 24 was at Whitewood, west of Sturgis. It traveled east along what is now South Dakota Highway 34 to near Marcus, then northward to Faith. This northward segment was shifted east around 1931, to what is now South Dakota Highway 73; it became part of the latter's alignment in 1936.

Around 1940, the western terminus was pushed a bit further, to U.S. Highway 85. A branch of SD 24, called South Dakota Highway 24A, extended northwest from Whitewood to Belle Fourche. The mainline SD 24 was rerouted over this branch around 1948, to its new terminus at Belle Fourche. A further extension was made in the early 1950s west from Belle Fourche to the Wyoming border.

Between 1957 and 1960, the route was eliminated by a westward extension of SD 34.

Browse numbered routes
← SD 23	SD	→ SD 24A

== Highway 24A ==
Highway 24A
- Location: Black Hills
- Length: 27 mi (43 km)
- Existed: c. 1940–1948

South Dakota Highway 24A was a state route located in the northern Black Hills of South Dakota. SD 24A was implemented around 1940, as a branch off SD 24 to Belle Fourche. By 1948, the mainline South Dakota 24 was rerouted onto this alignment when U.S. Highway 14 was realigned. This route is currently part of South Dakota Highway 34.

Browse numbered routes
← SD 24	SD	→ SD 25

== Highway 27 ==
Highway 27
- Location: Bon Homme and Hutchinson counties
- Existed: 1926–c. 1936

South Dakota Highway 27 (SD 27) was a state highway that existed in the southeastern part of the U.S. state of South Dakota. It was established in 1926 from SD 50, northeast of Tabor, to U.S. Route 18 (US 18), west of Olivet. By 1936, it was redesignated as part of SD 35.

Browse numbered routes
← SD 26	SD	→ SD 27

== Highway 35 ==
Highway 35
- Location: Near Tabor to near Emery
- Length: 19 mi (31 km)
- Existed: c. 1935–1976

South Dakota Highway 35 was a state route located in southeast South Dakota. This route was established around 1935, as a renumbering of South Dakota Highway 27. At that time, SD 27's northern terminus was at U.S. Highway 18; SD 35 was extended north to South Dakota Highway 42. The route was deleted in 1976. The segment south of U.S. 18 became part of a split South Dakota Highway 25; the segment to the north is unnumbered.

Browse numbered routes
← SD 34	SD	→ SD 36

== Highway 41 ==
Highway 41
- Location: Ravinia–North Dakota
- Length: 197 mi (317 km)
- Existed: 1926–c. 1952

South Dakota Highway 41 was a state route located in eastern South Dakota. South Dakota 41 was the original designation of U.S. Highway 281 in the state. When assigned in the mid-1920s, SD 41 ran nearly the entire length of the state north to south. A gap existed between U.S. Highway 14 and South Dakota Highway 34 east of Wessington Springs; this was completed by 1929.

When U.S. 281 was assigned in the early 1930s, it was routed along the SD 41 alignment between the North Dakota border and U.S. 14. SD 41 remained separate south from there, as U.S. 281 continued south via Huron and Mitchell. By 1933, this segment of U.S. 281 was moved onto SD 41 as well, southward to U.S. Highway 16 at Plankinton. Around 1936, the dual signage was dropped, and the northern terminus of SD 41 was located at Plankinton.

No changes took place in the 1940s, however, in the early 1950s, another alignment change in U.S. 281 took over the remainder of SD 41, and the number was discontinued.

Browse numbered routes
← SD 40A	SD	→ SD 42

== Highway 54 ==
Highway 54
- Location: Bonesteel–Nebraska
- Length: 16 mi (26 km)
- Existed: c. 1926–c. 1960

South Dakota Highway 54 was a short state route in southeast Gregory County, South Dakota. South Dakota 54 was implemented around 1926 as part of the state highway network. Its western terminus was at South Dakota Highway 50 (present day U.S. Highway 18) at Bonesteel. It ran south and east through Fairfax to the Nebraska border. By 1935, it was pulled back to Fairfax, at the intersection with the new U.S. Highway 281. Around 1953, due to the pending flooding of its old alignment, U.S. 18 was rerouted south onto this route, and SD 54 was limited to a 1-mile (1.6 km) segment north of the border. This last segment was eliminated around 1960, when U.S. 281 was rerouted onto it.

Browse numbered routes
← SD 53	SD	→ SD 55

== Highway 59 ==
Highway 59
- Location: Nebraska–Murdo
- Length: 51 mi (82 km)
- Existed: 1927–c. 1935

South Dakota Highway 59 was a state route in south central South Dakota. South Dakota 59 was implemented in 1927 as a renumbering of part of South Dakota Highway 63, which was truncated. Its northern terminus was at U.S. Highway 16 in Murdo, and traveled south via White River to Mission (South Dakota Highway 50, present day U.S. Highway 18). The southern terminus was extended to the Nebraska border north of Valentine, Nebraska, by 1929.

Around 1932, U.S. Highway 183 was implemented along the entire alignment of SD 59. The dual signage was removed by 1935. The road became part of U.S. Highway 83 in the 1940s, when the alignments of U.S. 83 and U.S. 183 were swapped.

Browse numbered routes
← SD 55	SD	→ SD 61

== Highway 298 ==
Highway 298
- Location: Fall River County
- Length: 1.5 mi (2.4 km)
- Existed: c. 1942–1998

South Dakota State Highway 298 served the former Black Hills Ordnance Depot at Igloo, in far southwest South Dakota (Fall River County). South Dakota 298 extended from the depot to South Dakota Highway 471 northeast of Igloo. It was decommissioned in 1998.

Browse numbered routes
← SD 296	SD	→ SD 314
