= Archeological Site No. 39MP3 =

- U.S. National Register of Historic Places
- Nearest city: Long Lake, South Dakota
- Area: less than one acre
- MPS: Prehistoric Rock Art of South Dakota MPS
- NRHP reference No.: 93000795
- Added to NRHP: August 6, 1993

39MP3 is an archaeological site in McPherson County, South Dakota. It consists of a panel of rock art, on which designs have been pecked. The designs on this panel appear to resemble heads of bison, a theme echoed in other rock art panels in the area.

The site was listed on the National Register of Historic Places in 1993.

== See also ==
- National Register of Historic Places listings in McPherson County, South Dakota
