= South Dakota Highway 27 =

State highway in South Dakota, United States

Highway 27

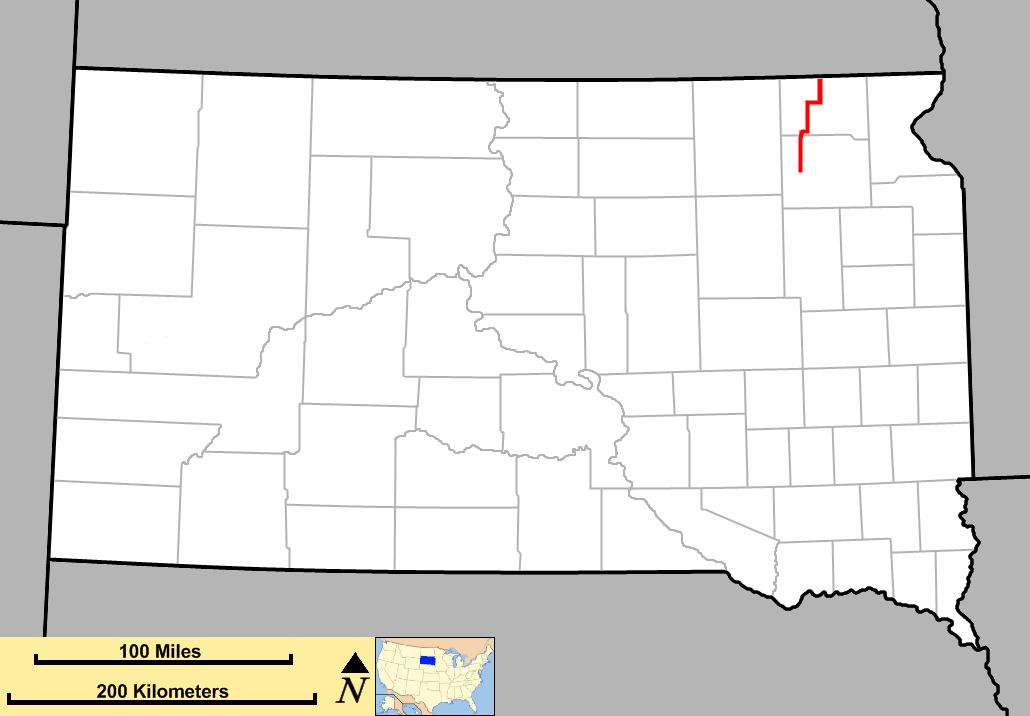
- Map of South Dakota with SD 27 in red

Route information
- Maintained by SDDOT
- Length: 42.639 mi (68.621 km)
- Existed: 1976–present

Major junctions
- South end: US 12 southeast of Andover
- SD 10 from Britton to east of Britton
- North end: ND 32 at the North Dakota state line northeast of Kidder

Location
- Country: United States
- State: South Dakota
- Counties: Day; Marshall

Highway system
- South Dakota State Trunk Highway System; Interstate; US; State
| ← SD 26 | → SD 28 |

Today's South Dakota Highway 27 (SD 27) is a 42.639-mile (68.621 km) state highway in Day and Marshall counties in South Dakota, United States, that connects Pierpont, Langford, and Britton. In the 1920s and 1930s, this highway number previously was used for a highway in southeaster South Dakota between Tabor and Olivet.

== Route description ==
=== Day County ===
SD 27 begins at an intersection with U.S. Route 12 (US 12) southeast of Andover, in the central part of Day County. Here, the roadway continues to the south as 419th Avenue (County Road 35). SD 27 travels to the north, through rural areas of the county. North of 133rd Street, it skirts along the western edge of the Pierpont Lake Recreation Area and Piepont Lake. North of 131st Street, it intersects the western terminus of 1st Street, which is also signed as a "city truck route" and as "130 A Street". Just north of this intersection, the highway enters the southwestern part of Pierpont. An intersection with the western terminus of Main Street leads to the business district of the town. It skirts along the western edge of the Pierpont City Park. Just north of an intersection with the western terminus of 3rd Street, it leaves the city limits of Pierpont. At an intersection with the western terminus of 4th Street, it leaves the city park. Just south of 125th Street, the highway crosses over Antelope Creek. South of 124th Street, it curves to the north-northeast. At the intersection with 124th Street, it enters the southwestern part of Marshall County.

=== Marshall County ===
North of this intersection, SD 27 enters the southeastern part of Langford. At an intersection with the eastern terminus of Main Street, it turns right and travels to the east. East of Lesher Street, it leaves the city limits of Langford. East of 422nd Avenue, it curves back to the north. Just south of 119th Street, it passes Hickman Lake to the west. This intersection allows access to Hickman Dam Lake and Marshall County Sportsman Club and Range. Just south of 112th Street, the highway crosses over Crow Creek. North of 111th Street, it enters the south-central part of Britton. Just south of 8th Street, it crosses over some railroad tracks of BNSF Railway. The next intersection is with SD 10 (Vander Horck Street). Here, SD 10 and SD 27 head concurrently to the east, while the Main Street name continues to the north. Just west of 7th Avenue, they cross over the railroad tracks of BNSF Railway from before. An intersection with 5th Avenue leads to Marshall County Healthcare Center. East of 3rd Avenue, they leave the city limits of Britton. At an intersection with 429th Avenue, the two highways split, with SD 27 resuming its path to the north. Between 109th Street and County Road 6 (CR 6; 108th Street), it crosses over Crow Creek again. From just south of 106th Street to south of CR 4 (104th Street), it passes west of White Lake (a lake, not the city of White Lake, South Dakota) and crosses White Rice Creek. CR 4 leads to Kidder and Veblen. North of the western terminus of CR 2 (101st Street), it curves to the north-northeast and meets its northern terminus, an intersection with the western terminus of CR 2G (100th Street) on the North Dakota state line. Here, the roadway continues to the north-northeast as North Dakota Highway 32 (ND 32).

=== National Highway System ===
No part of SD 27 is included as part of the National Highway System, a system of routes determined to be the most important for the nation's economy, mobility and defense.

== History ==
South Dakota highway routes and numbers have undergone several changes through time (see List of former state highways in South Dakota). Today's SD 27 originally was part of SD 25, which was established in 1926 and, at that time, ran from Howard, South Dakota northward to what in 1936 was ND 9 (today's ND32) near Havana, North Dakota. The SD 27 designation for today's route began in 1976.

Back in 1926, SD 27 designated a different highway from Tabor, South Dakota, to Olivet, South Dakota, far south of today's SD 27; that older SD 27 became part of SD 35 in 1936.

== Major intersections ==
| County | Location | mi | km | Destinations | Notes |
|---|---|---|---|---|---|
| Day | | 0.000 | 0.000 | US 12 / 419th Avenue south – Groton, Webster | Southern terminus; roadway continues to the south as 419th Avenue. |
| Marshall | Britton | 32.637 | 52.524 | SD 10 west (Vander Horck) / Main Street north – Houghton | Southern end of SD 10 concurrency; roadway continues to the north as Main Street. |
| Marshall | | 34.173 | 54.996 | SD 10 east / 429th Avenue south – Sisseton | Northern end of SD 10 concurrency; roadway continues to the south as 429th Avenue. |
| Marshall | | 42.639 | 68.621 | ND 32 north – Havana, Forman | Northern terminus of SD 27; continuation into North Dakota |
1.000 mi = 1.609 km; 1.000 km = 0.621 mi: Concurrency terminus

== See also ==
- List of state highways in South Dakota
