= South Dakota Highway 258 =

State highway in South Dakota, United States

Highway 258

Route information
- Maintained by SDDOT
- Length: 2.552 mi (4.107 km)

Major junctions
- West end: I-90 south of Plankinton
- East end: US 281 east of Plankinton

Location
- Country: United States
- State: South Dakota
- Counties: Aurora

Highway system
- South Dakota State Trunk Highway System; Interstate; US; State
← SD 253	→ SD 262
← I-190	SD 203	→ SD 204

South Dakota Highway 258 (SD 258) is a 2.552-mile-long (4.107 km) state highway in Aurora County, South Dakota. It runs from Interstate 90 (I-90) to U.S. Route 281 (US 281), and is maintained by the South Dakota Department of Transportation (SDDOT). The route is not a part of the National Highway System.

== Route description ==
SD 258 begins at a diamond interchange with exit 308 of I-90 and travels north. The route enters the city of Plankinton almost immediately and continues north. The highway turns east onto Davenport Street in Plankinton and a curve takes the highway to the northeast. After leaving Plankinton, the road curves back to the east and continues through open plains for about one mile (1.6 km) before reaching its eastern terminus at an intersection with US 281. The roadway continues east of this intersection as County Road 34.

SD 258 is maintained by SDDOT. In 2012, the traffic on the road was measured in average annual daily traffic. SD 258 was measured at 900 vehicles.

== Major intersections ==
The entire route is in Aurora County.

Location	mi	km	Destinations	Notes
Plankinton Township	0.000	0.000	I-90	Western terminus
Plankinton Township	1.627	2.618	SD 203 north	
Plankinton–Hopper township line	2.552	4.107	US 281	Eastern terminus
1.000 mi = 1.609 km; 1.000 km = 0.621 mi

== South Dakota Highway 203 ==
Highway 203
- Location: Plankinton Township
- Length: 0.957 mi (1,540 m)

South Dakota Highway 203 (SD 203) is a 0.957-mile-long (1.540 km) poorly signed spur off SD 258, located along the eastern outskirts of Plankinton. It connects the town, via SD 258, to the Aurora Plains Academy (a youth treatment facility and school).

SD 203 begins at an intersection with SD 258, immediately crossing a railroad track before heading north through flat plains to pass by the Plankinton baseball field and have an intersection with County Road 32 (CR 32, E 3rd Street), before passing by a derby racetrack and a cemetery. The highway has an intersection with 10th Street before state maintenance ends just shortly after passing by one of the entrances to Aurora Plains Academy, with the road continuing north as a gravel county road (County Road 39 (CR 39), 387th Avenue).

The entire length of SD 203 is a paved, rural, two-lane state highway.

The entire route is in Plankinton Township, Aurora County.

mi	km	Destinations	Notes
0.000	0.000	SD 258 / I-90 BL (Old Highway 16) – Plankinton, Mount Vernon	Southern terminus
0.957	1.540	CR 39 north (387th Avenue)	Northern end of state maintenance at entrance of Aurora Plains Academy; northern terminus; road continues north as CR 39 (387th Avenue)
1.000 mi = 1.609 km; 1.000 km = 0.621 mi
