= Mound City =

Mound City may refer to:

== Places ==
- Mound City, Arkansas
- Mound City, Illinois
  - Mound City National Cemetery
- Mound City, Kansas
- Mound City, Missouri
- Mound City, South Dakota
- Big Mound City, near Canal Point, Florida

== Other uses ==
- Hopewell Culture National Historical Park, formerly designated "Mound City Group National Monument"
- The Mound City (train), operated by the Illinois Terminal Railroad between St. Louis, Missouri and Peoria, Illinois
- Mound City and Eastern Railway, in McPherson County, South Dakota
- St. Louis, Missouri, nicknamed Mound City due to the presence of several ceremonial mounds
- USS Mound City, a gunboat used by the Union in the American Civil War
