= David N. Crouch =

American politician (1853–1944)

David Nelson Crouch (June 18, 1853 in Tennessee – March 5, 1944) of Leola, South Dakota was an Independent member of the South Dakota House of Representatives representing McPherson County from the 42nd House District. He served during the 19th Legislative Session, which ran from 1925 to 1926.

He previously served as a member of the Missouri House of Representatives from 1891 to 1892 representing Sullivan County, Missouri as a Democrat.
