= South Dakota Highway 251 =

State highway in South Dakota, United States

Highway 251
- SD 251 highlighted in red

Route information
- Maintained by SDDOT
- Length: 15.800 mi (25.428 km)

Major junctions
- South end: At the Nebraska border south of Gregory
- North end: US 18 / SD 47 in Gregory

Location
- Country: United States
- State: South Dakota
- Counties: Gregory

Highway system
- South Dakota State Trunk Highway System; Interstate; US; State
← SD 249	→ SD 253

South Dakota Highway 251 (SD 251) is a state route in the U.S. state of South Dakota. SD 251's southern terminus is at the Nebraska border, and the northern terminus is at U.S. Route 18 (US 18) and SD 47 in Gregory. The entire speed limit outside of Gregory is 55 MPH, and serves a virtually unpopulated area of Gregory County.

== Major intersections ==
The entire route is in Gregory County.

Location	mi	km	Destinations	Notes
Carlock Township	0.000	0.000	Gregory Avenue	Continuation into Nebraska; gravel road
Gregory	15.800	25.428	US 18 / SD 47 – Burke, Winner	
1.000 mi = 1.609 km; 1.000 km = 0.621 mi
