= Amos Hoffman House =

Historic house in South Dakota, United States

- Formerly listed on the U.S. National Register of Historic Places
- Location: SD 10, Leola, South Dakota
- Coordinates: 45°43′39″N 98°56′54″W
- Area: less than one acre
- Built: 1905
- Built by: Hoffman, Amos
- NRHP reference No.: 86001476

Significant dates
- Added to NRHP: August 13, 1986
- Removed from NRHP: September 9, 2021

The Amos Hoffman House, on South Dakota Highway 10 in Leola, South Dakota, was built in 1905. It was listed on the National Register of Historic Places in 1986. It was delisted in 2021.

The house of Amos Hoffman, who was then living four miles southwest of Leola, was one of few Leola area homesteads surviving an 1889 prairie fire which destroyed Leola itself.
