= South Dakota Highway 47 =

State highway in South Dakota, United States

Highway 47

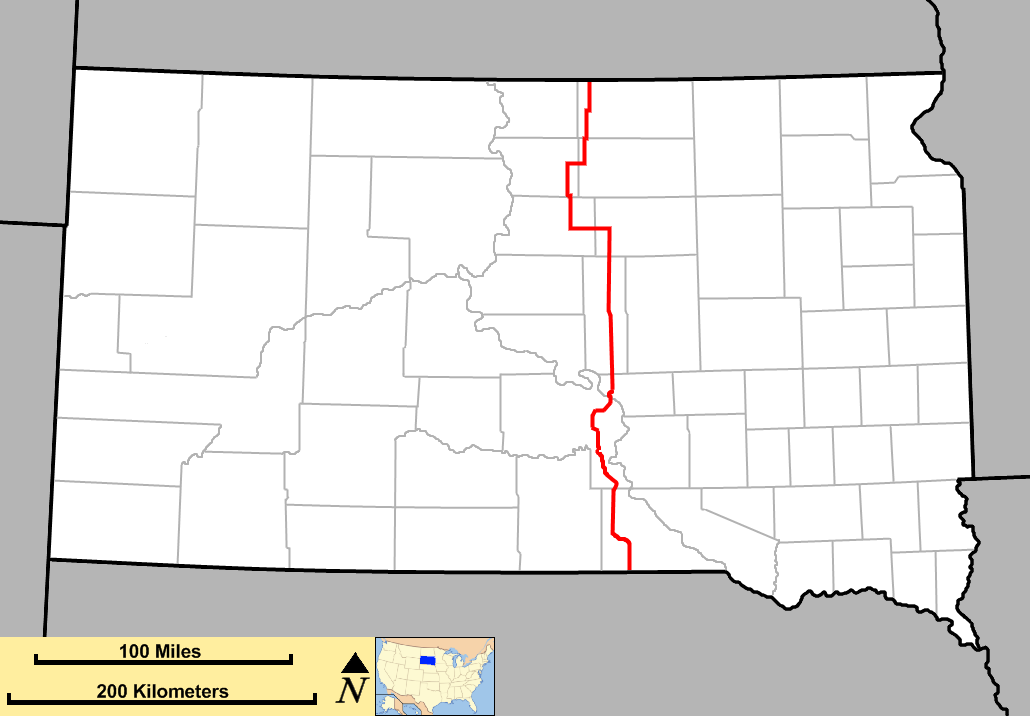
- Route of SD 47 (in red)

Route information
- Maintained by SDDOT
- Length: 240.866 mi (387.636 km)
- Existed: 1927–present

Major junctions
- South end: N-137 at the Nebraska border near Brocksburg, NE
- US 18 from Burke to Gregory; I-90 near Reliance; US 14 in Highmore; US 212 from Seneca to Lebanon; SD 20 in Hoven; US 12 in Bowdle
- North end: 37th Avenue Southeast at the North Dakota border near Venturia, ND

Location
- Country: United States
- State: South Dakota

Highway system
- South Dakota State Trunk Highway System; Interstate; US; State
← SD 46	→ SD 48

South Dakota Highway 47 (SD 47) is a state route that runs north to south across the central portion of South Dakota. It begins at an unnumbered highway at the North Dakota border north of Eureka, and ends at the Nebraska border, where it becomes Nebraska Highway 137. It is just under 241 miles (388 km) in length.

== History ==
When initially established in the mid-1920s, South Dakota 47 extended from U.S. Highway 16 at Pukwana to U.S. Highway 18 at Wheeler, along what is currently portions of South Dakota Highway 50 and Charles Mix County Highway 49. Around 1932, the south end of SD 47 was truncated at Platte, then a few years later in 1936, SD 47 was extended west to Chamberlain, before heading north to the intersection of U.S. Highway 14 at Highmore.

The segment between Pukwana and Platte was redesignated as part of South Dakota Highway 43 c. 1939, and SD 47 was rerouted west from Chamberlain to Oacoma, then extended southward to U. S. 18 at Gregory. 11 years later, c. 1950, SD 47 was extended south to the Nebraska border, via a shared alignment with U. S. 18 to Burke.

In 1955, near Oacoma, SD 47 was rerouted west to near Reliance, before heading south to meet with the old alignment near the White River. Also in 1955, SD 47 was extended north to Eureka via Lebanon and Bowdle. Ten years later, in 1965, the highway would be extended further north to the North Dakota border.

In 1976, the segment between Ft. Thompson and Reliance, which had previously passed through Chamberlain and Oacoma, was rerouted onto the more direct road formerly known as South Dakota Highway 47W, which had been constructed around 1965. The previous segment between Ft. Thompson and Chamberlain was designated as an extension of South Dakota Highway 50.

== Major intersections ==
County	Location	mi	km	Destinations	Notes
Keya Paha		0.000	0.000	N-137 south	Continuation into Nebraska
Gregory	Burke	12.526	20.159	US 18 east / Lewis and Clark Trail	Eastern end of US 18 concurrency
Gregory	Gregory	20.607	33.164	US 18 west / SD 251 south	Northern terminus of SD 251, western end of US 18 concurrency
Gregory		30.923	49.766	SD 44	
Lyman		57.040	91.797	SD 49 south	Northern terminus of SD 49
Lyman		66.827– 66.951	107.548– 107.747	I-90 – Chamberlain	I-90 exit 251.
Lyman	Reliance	69.696	112.165	SD 248 / Lewis and Clark Trail	
Buffalo	Fort Thompson	89.034	143.286	SD 249 north	Southern terminus of SD 249
Buffalo	Fort Thompson	89.639	144.260	SD 34 east / Lewis and Clark Trail	Southern end of SD 34 concurrency
Hyde		99.110	159.502	SD 34 west / Lewis and Clark Trail	Northern end of SD 34 concurrency
Hyde	Highmore	120.931	194.620	US 14 – Pierre, Huron	
Hyde		138.539	222.957	SD 26 east	Western terminus of SD 26
Faulk		157.633	253.686	US 212 east	Eastern end of US 212 concurrency
Potter	Lebanon	171.602	276.167	US 212 west	Western end of US 212 concurrency
Potter		181.590	292.241	SD 20 east	Southern end of SD 20 concurrency
Walworth	Hoven	185.270	298.163	SD 20 west	Northern end of SD 20 concurrency
Walworth		199.254	320.668	US 12 west	Western end of US 12 concurrency
Edmunds	Bowdle	206.415	332.193	US 12 east	Eastern end of US 12 concurrency
Edmunds		215.665	347.079	SD 253 south	Northern terminus of SD 253
McPherson	Eureka	227.833	366.662	SD 10 west	Western end of SD 10 concurrency
McPherson	Eureka	228.764	368.160	SD 10 east	Eastern end of SD 10 concurrency
McIntosh		240.866	387.636	37th Avenue Southeast	Continuation into North Dakota
1.000 mi = 1.609 km; 1.000 km = 0.621 mi: Concurrency terminus

== Related route ==
Highway 47W
- Location: Fort Thompson – Reliance
- Length: 19 mi (31 km)
- Existed: 1965 (approx.)–1976

South Dakota Highway 47W was a state route located in central South Dakota. SD 47W designated around 1965, on a newly constructed road linking Fort Thompson and Reliance. This designation was used only for 10 years; it was made part of South Dakota Highway 47 when a portion of that route was realigned.
