= South Dakota Highway 249 =

State highway in South Dakota, United States

Highway 249

Route information
- Maintained by SDDOT
- Length: 1.055 mi (1.698 km)
- Existed: 1975–present

Major junctions
- South end: SD 47 in Fort Thompson
- North end: SD 34 east of Fort Thompson

Location
- Country: United States
- State: South Dakota
- Counties: Buffalo

Highway system
- South Dakota State Trunk Highway System; Interstate; US; State
← SD 248	→ SD 251

South Dakota Highway 249 (SD 249) is a state highway in the U.S. state of South Dakota that extends from SD 47 to SD 34 in Buffalo County. The entire highway is located within Fort Thompson and is maintained by the South Dakota Department of Transportation (SDDOT). It is not a part of the National Highway System.

== Route description ==
SD 249 begins in Fort Thompson at an intersection with SD 47 and treks northeast through open plains. The roadway continues in this direction for about one mile (1.6 km) before curving to the east and merging with SD 34. SD 249 terminates at this intersection. The route is maintained by SDDOT. In 2012, the traffic on the road was measured in average annual daily traffic. The highway had an average of 500 vehicles. The highway is not a part of the National Highway System, a system of highways important to the nation's defense, economy, and mobility.

== Major intersections ==
The entire route is in Fort Thompson, Buffalo County.

mi	km	Destinations	Notes
0.000	0.000	SD 47	Southern terminus
1.055	1.698	SD 34	Northern terminus
1.000 mi = 1.609 km; 1.000 km = 0.621 mi
