= Dean O. Mehlhaff =

American politician

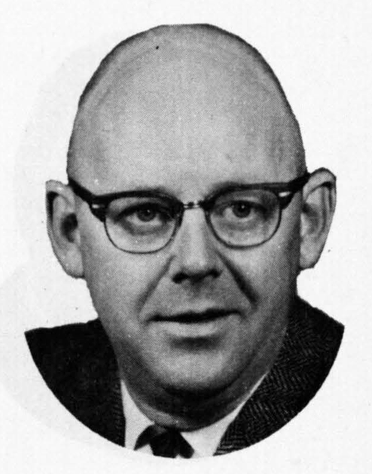

Member of the South Dakota House of Representatives from the 20th district
- In office 1967–1976

Personal details
- Born: June 28, 1927 Eureka, South Dakota
- Died: April 27, 2016 (aged 88) Aberdeen, South Dakota
- Party: Republican
- Spouse(s): Donna F. Gerhardt (m. Aug. 26, 1948)

Dean O. Mehlhaff (June 28, 1927 – April 27, 2016) was an American politician in the state of South Dakota. He was a member of the South Dakota House of Representatives from 1967 to 1976. He served in the United States Army and was a president of the Eureka Chamber of Commerce. He worked in banking and insurance. He died on April 27, 2016, aged 88.
