= Pierpont, South Dakota =

- Town
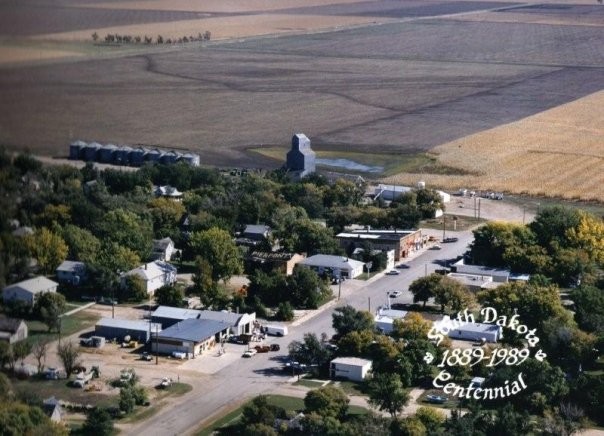
- Aerial photograph of Pierpont,
- Nickname: Pierpont Panthers
- Location in Day County and the state of South Dakota
- Coordinates: 45°29′43″N 97°49′56″W
- Country: United States
- State: South Dakota
- County: Day

Area
  - Total: 0.15 sq mi (0.39 km^{2})
  - Land: 0.15 sq mi (0.39 km^{2})
  - Water: 0 sq mi (0.00 km^{2})
- Elevation: 1,509 ft (460 m)

Population (2020)
  - Total: 129
  - Density: 865.4/sq mi (334.14/km^{2})
- Time zone: UTC-6 (Central (CST))
  - Summer (DST): UTC-5 (CDT)
- ZIP code: 57468
- Area code: 605
- FIPS code: 46-49540
- GNIS feature ID: 1267532

Pierpont is a town in northwestern Day County, South Dakota, United States. The population was 129 at the 2020 census.

The town was founded in 1883 and takes its name from a railroad officer.

== Geography ==
According to the United States Census Bureau, the town has a total area of 0.15 square miles (0.39 km^{2}), all land.

== Demographics ==
Historical population
Census	Pop.	Note	%±
1910	314		—
1920	400		27.4%
1930	379		−5.2%
1940	362		−4.5%
1950	326		−9.9%
1960	258		−20.9%
1970	241		−6.6%
1980	184		−23.7%
1990	173		−6.0%
2000	122		−29.5%
2010	135		10.7%
2020	129		−4.4%
U.S. Decennial Census

=== 2010 census ===
As of the census of 2010, there were 135 people, 67 households, and 35 families residing in the town. The population density was 900.0 inhabitants per square mile (347.5/km^{2}). There were 78 housing units at an average density of 520.0 per square mile (200.8/km^{2}). The racial makeup of the town was 95.6% White, 0.7% African American, 1.5% Native American, 1.5% from other races, and 0.7% from two or more races. Hispanic or Latino of any race were 1.5% of the population.

There were 67 households, of which 17.9% had children under the age of 18 living with them, 43.3% were married couples living together, 4.5% had a female householder with no husband present, 4.5% had a male householder with no wife present, and 47.8% were non-families. 43.3% of all households were made up of individuals, and 20.9% had someone living alone who was 65 years of age or older. The average household size was 2.01 and the average family size was 2.71.

The median age in the town was 47.8 years. 21.5% of residents were under the age of 18; 3.7% were between the ages of 18 and 24; 19.2% were from 25 to 44; 34.1% were from 45 to 64; and 21.5% were 65 years of age or older. The gender makeup of the town was 54.8% male and 45.2% female.

=== 2000 census ===
As of the census of 2000, there were 122 people, 64 households, and 32 families residing in the town. The population density was 816.5 inhabitants per square mile (315.3/km^{2}). There were 83 housing units at an average density of 555.5 per square mile (214.5/km^{2}). The racial makeup of the town was 99.18% White and 0.82% Native American.

There were 64 households, out of which 14.1% had children under the age of 18 living with them, 43.8% were married couples living together, 3.1% had a female householder with no husband present, and 50.0% were non-families. 46.9% of all households were made up of individuals, and 29.7% had someone living alone who was 65 years of age or older. The average household size was 1.91 and the average family size was 2.63.

In the town, the population was spread out, with 15.6% under the age of 18, 2.5% from 18 to 24, 23.0% from 25 to 44, 23.8% from 45 to 64, and 35.2% who were 65 years of age or older. The median age was 50 years. For every 100 females, there were 100.0 males. For every 100 females age 18 and over, there were 114.6 males.

The median income for a household in the town was $29,464, and the median income for a family was $40,417. Males had a median income of $23,125 versus $18,438 for females. The per capita income for the town was $15,955. There were no families and 4.1% of the population living below the poverty line, including no under eighteens and 9.6% of those over 64.

== Education ==
Pierpont Public School housed grades K-12 from 1898 through 1969 when the high school was consolidated with the Langford School District and the Claremont, SD School District.

== See also ==
- List of towns in South Dakota
