= Mound Creek =

River in Minnesota, U.S.

Coordinates: 44°12′02″N 95°04′30″W

Mound Creek is a stream in Brown and Cottonwood counties, in the U.S. state of Minnesota.

Mound Creek was named for nearby mounds of quartzite.

== See also ==
- List of rivers of Minnesota
