= South Dakota Highway 26 =

State highway in South Dakota, United States

Highway 26

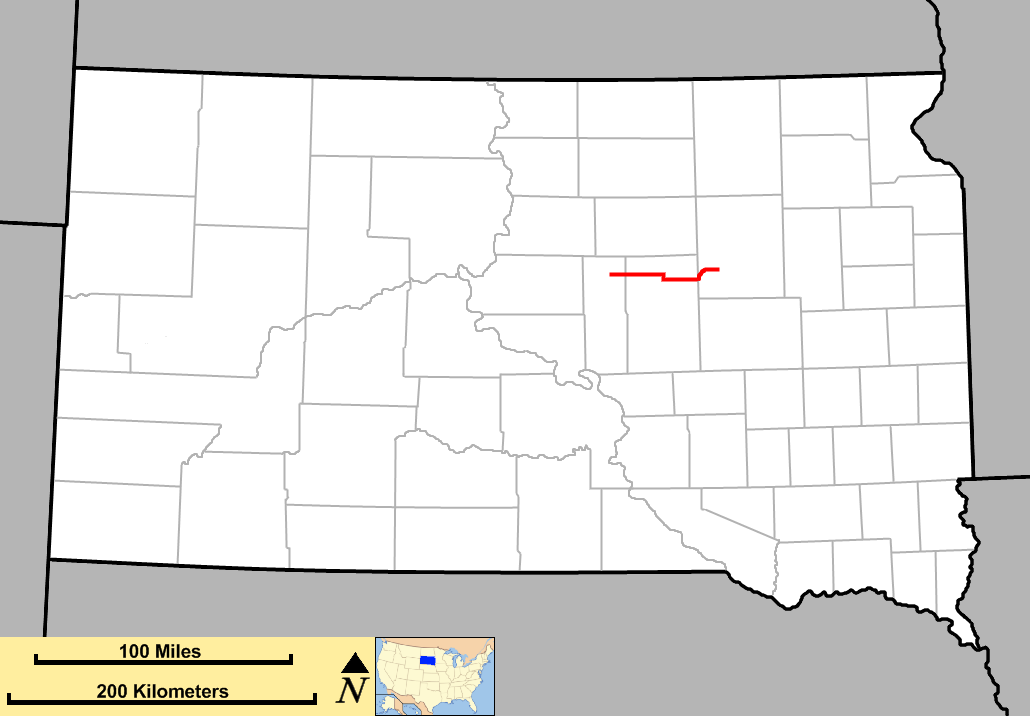
- Map of South Dakota with SD 26 in red

Route information
- Maintained by SDDOT
- Length: 49.540 mi (79.727 km)
- Existed: c. 1935–present

Major junctions
- West end: SD 47 north of Highmore
- SD 45 southwest of Rockham
- East end: US 281 south of Redfield

Location
- Country: United States
- State: South Dakota
- Counties: Hyde, Hand, Spink

Highway system
- South Dakota State Trunk Highway System; Interstate; US; State
← SD 25	→ SD 27

South Dakota Highway 26 (SD 26) is a 49.540-mile-long (79.727 km) state highway in the central part of the U.S. state of South Dakota. It connects rural areas of Hyde, Hand, and Spink counties.

The highway was established around 1935, replacing SD 22. The segment between SD 45 and SD 47 was added to the path of SD 26 between 1957 and 1962.

An extension of this highway, from US 83 in Onida to SD 47 was proposed in the late 1970s. Although a road was built in this area, it was not designated as part of SD 26.

== Route description ==
=== Hyde County ===
SD 26 begins at an intersection with SD 47 and the eastern terminus of County Road 645 (180th Street) at a point north of Highmore, in the north-central part of Hyde County. SD 26 takes 180th Street to the east. At an intersection with 344th Avenue, it enters the northwestern part of Hand County.

=== Hand County ===
Just west of 345th Avenue, SD 26 crosses over Lost Creek. West of 354th Avenue, it enters Polo. East of Polo Drive, it leaves the community. East of 357th Avenue, the highway crosses over Shaefer Creek. East of 359th Avenue, it intersects SD 45. The two highways travel concurrently to the south for approximately 1 mile (1.6 km), while 180th Street continues to the east. At 181st Street, SD 26 splits off and resumes its eastward routing. Just west of 366th Avenue, it crosses over North Wolf Creek. Just west of 369th Avenue, it curves to the east-southeast. Between 370th and 371st avenues, it curves back to the east. At an intersection with CR 24 (374th Avenue), it enters the southwestern part of Spink County.

=== Spink County ===
Immediately, SD 26 crosses over Medicine Creek and curves to the north. South of 180th Street, the highway curves to the north-northwest and begins to parallel the western part of Cottonwood Lake. Just north of this intersection, it curves to the north-northeast and winds its way along the shore of the lake. At the northern edge of the lake, the highway curves to the east-northeast. Just east of 178th Street, it curves to the east and then to the north. Just south of CR 19 (377th Avenue), SD 26 curves to the east. East of 378th Avenue, it curves to the east-southeast and crosses over Turtle Creek. East of 384th Avenue, it curves to the east-northeast and reaches its eastern terminus, an intersection with U.S. Route 281 (US 281).

=== National Highway System ===
No part of SD 26 is included as part of the National Highway System, a system of routes determined to be the most important for the nation's economy, mobility and defense.

== History ==
The original SD 26 was established in 1926 from SD 25 west of Bryant to SD 15 east of Estelline. This route was renumbered as SD 28 around 1935. SD 26 was established around 1935. Its path replaced that of SD 22. The western part of the highway, between SD 45 and SD 47 was added to the path of SD 26 between 1957 and 1962.

United-Buckingham Freight Lines, Inc. filed a proposal on October 25, 1972, to utilize a deviation route for operating convenience, allowing for the transportation of general commodities between Minneapolis, Minn., and Helena, Mont., via U.S. Highways 10 and 12. This proposed route offers a more direct alternative to the carrier's existing, more complex authorized routes through Minnesota and South Dakota.

In the late 1970s, the highway was planned to be extended from US 83 in Onida to SD 47. There is a road in this area, but it is an unnumbered path. The SD 26 designated was not placed on this roadway.

== Major intersections ==
County	Location	mi	km	Destinations	Notes
Hyde		0.000	0.000	SD 47 / CR 645 west (180th Street) – US 212, Highmore	Western terminus
Hand		23.728	38.187	SD 45 north / 180th Street east – US 212	Western end of SD 45 concurrency; roadway continues to the east as 180th Street.
Hand		26.704	42.976	SD 45 south – Miller	Eastern end of SD 45 concurrency
Spink		49.540	79.727	US 281 – US 14, Redfield	Eastern terminus
1.000 mi = 1.609 km; 1.000 km = 0.621 mi: Concurrency terminus
