= George Hoffman House =

Historic house in Pennsylvania, United States

- U.S. National Register of Historic Places
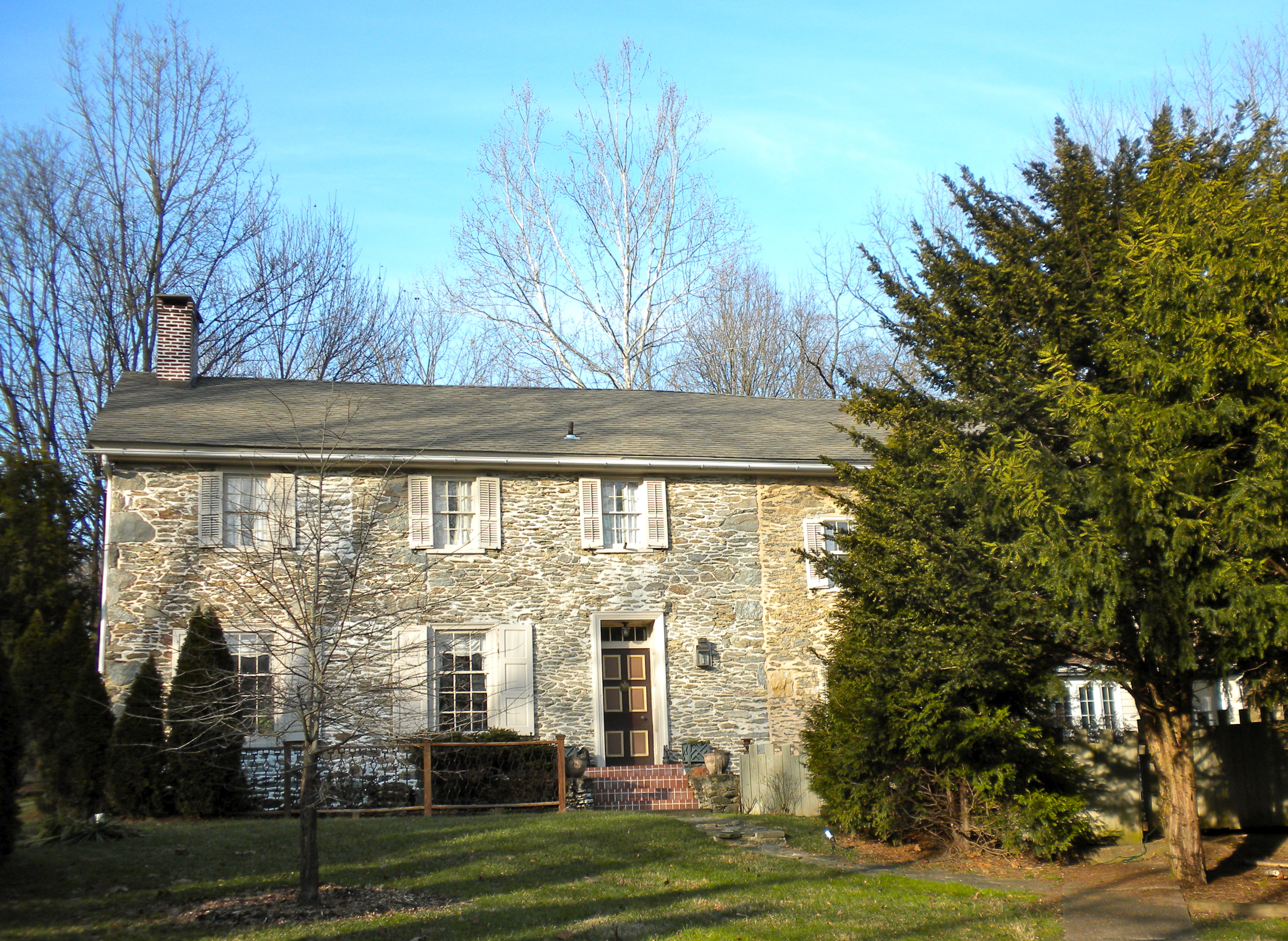
- George Hoffman House, January 2010

- Location within Pennsylvania Location within the United States
- Location: 1311 Grove Rd., West Whiteland Township, Pennsylvania
- Coordinates: 39°59′42″N 75°37′57″W
- Area: 1.5 acres (0.61 ha)
- Architectural style: Additive Vernacular
- MPS: West Whiteland Township MRA
- NRHP reference No.: 84003272
- Added to NRHP: August 2, 1984

The George Hoffman House is an historic home which is located in West Whiteland Township, Chester County, Pennsylvania, United States.

It was listed on the National Register of Historic Places in 1984.

== History and architectural features ==
Built in five sections, four of which are stone, the George Hoffman House is considered a vernacular additive dwelling, with the oldest sections dated to the eighteenth century. Also located on the property are a contributing shed, a double-decker stone barn and a corn crib.
