= Robert Mehlhoff =

American politician

Member of the Montana House of Representatives from the 26th district
- In office January 5, 2009 – January 2, 2017
- Succeeded by: Lola Sheldon-Galloway

Personal details
- Born: February 18, 1947 (age 79) Great Falls, Montana
- Party: Democrat

Robert Mehlhoff (born February 18, 1947) was a Democratic member of the Montana Legislature. He was elected to House District 26 which represents the Great Falls, Montana area.
