= South Red Iron Lake =

Lake in the state of South Dakota, United States

- Location of the lake in South Dakota
- Location: Marshall County, South Dakota
- Group: Red Iron Lake
- Coordinates: 45°40′18″N 97°19′06″W
- Type: Lake
- Basin countries: United States
- Surface elevation: 1,827 ft (557 m)

South Red Iron Lake is a natural lake in Marshall County, South Dakota, in the United States.

The Red Iron Lakes have the name of a Native American chieftain. The name of the lakes is derived from a theory that the name of this chieftain was Máza Ṡa (Red Iron), but in the Treaty of Traverse des Sioux his name is recorded as "Sounding Iron" or Máza S'a.

== See also ==
- List of lakes in South Dakota
- North Red Iron Lake
