= McPherson County Courthouse (South Dakota) =

- U.S. National Register of Historic Places
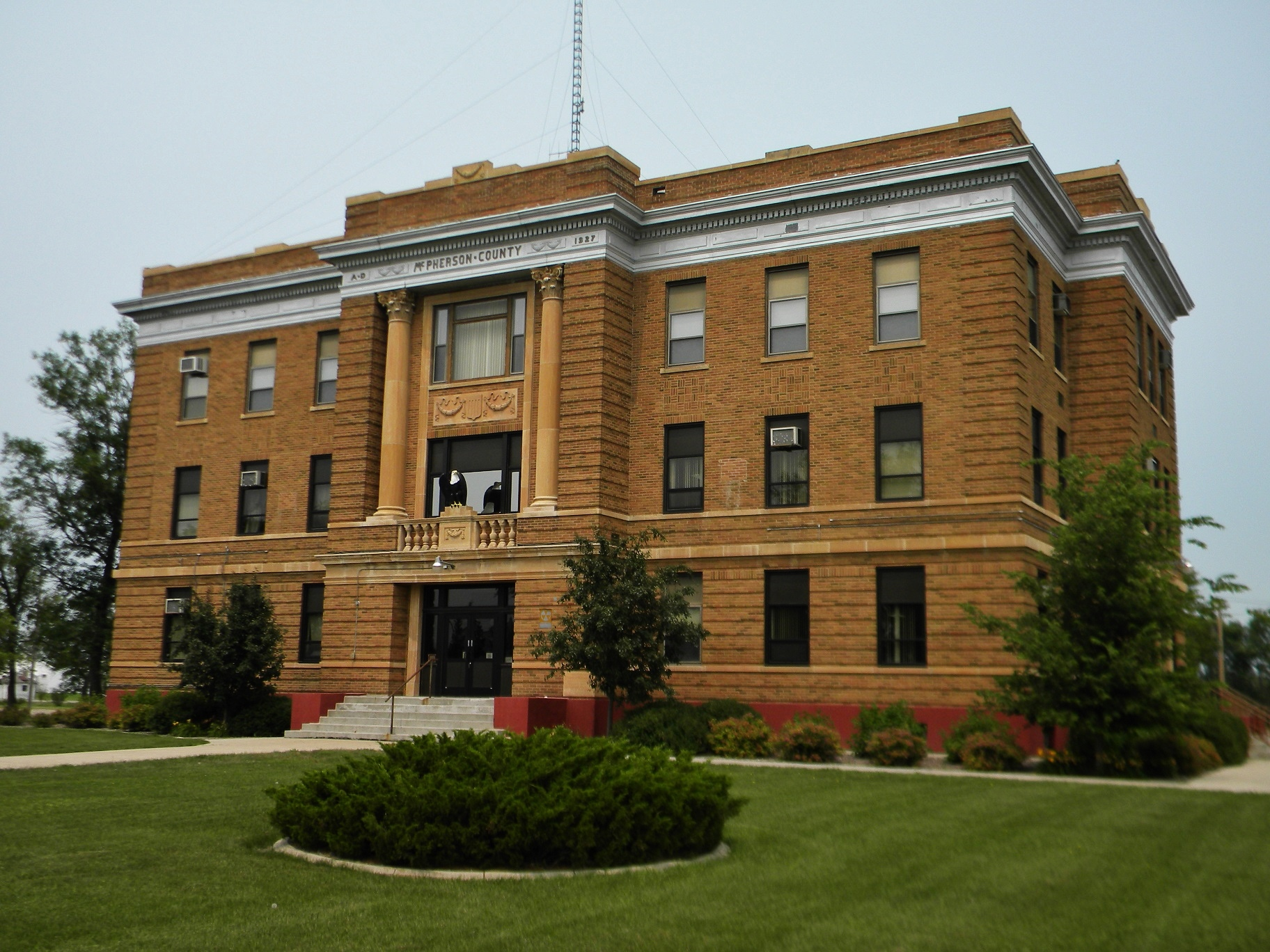

- Location within South Dakota Location within the United States
- Interactive map showing the location of McPherson County Courthouse
- Location: SD 10, Leola, South Dakota
- Coordinates: 45°43′24″N 98°56′22″W
- Area: 1 acre (0.40 ha)
- Built: 1928
- Built by: Max Herzog
- Architect: Buechner & Orth
- Architectural style: Renaissance
- NRHP reference No.: 86003020
- Added to NRHP: November 3, 1986

The McPherson County Courthouse, located on South Dakota Highway 10 in Leola, South Dakota, was built in 1928. It was listed on the National Register of Historic Places in 1986.

It was designed by architects Buchner & Orth.

The courtroom is equipped with panic buttons.
