= Hoffman House (Lancaster, Kentucky) =

- U.S. National Register of Historic Places
- Location within Kentucky Location within the United States
- Location: U.S. 27, Lincoln County, Kentucky
- Coordinates: 37°34′15.2″N 84°36′24.5″W
- Area: 0.7 acres (0.28 ha)
- Built: c.1850
- Architectural style: Greek Revival, Federal
- MPS: Early Stone Buildings of Central Kentucky TR
- NRHP reference No.: 83002809
- Added to NRHP: June 23, 1983

The Hoffman House, off U.S. Route 27 in Lincoln County, Kentucky between Lancaster and Stanford, was built around 1850. During the American Civil War the house "was the base of a large group of Confederates."

Listed on the National Register of Historic Places in 1983, it includes Greek Revival and Federal architecture. The original stone house was about 25 by 20 feet (7.6 m × 6.1 m) in plan; the house was expanded by an addition plus enclosure of a porch.
