= Lebanon, South Dakota =

- Town
- Location in Potter County and the state of South Dakota
- Coordinates: 45°04′08″N 99°45′59″W
- Country: United States
- State: South Dakota
- County: Potter
- Incorporated: 1917

Area
  - Total: 0.53 sq mi (1.37 km^{2})
  - Land: 0.53 sq mi (1.37 km^{2})
  - Water: 0 sq mi (0.00 km^{2})
- Elevation: 1,952 ft (595 m)

Population (2020)
  - Total: 33
  - Density: 62.2/sq mi (24.02/km^{2})
- Time zone: UTC-6 (Central (CST))
  - Summer (DST): UTC-5 (CDT)
- ZIP code: 57455
- Area code: 605
- FIPS code: 46-36260
- GNIS feature ID: 1267456

Lebanon is a town in Potter County, South Dakota, United States. The population was 33 at the 2020 census.

== History ==
Lebanon was first called Webb, and under the latter name was platted in 1887. The present name most likely is after Lebanon, New York, although some hold it is named after Mount Lebanon in Western Asia.

== Geography ==
According to the United States Census Bureau, the town has a total area of 0.53 square miles (1.37 km^{2}), all land.

== Demographics ==
Historical population
Census	Pop.	Note	%±
1920	325		—
1930	334		2.8%
1940	310		−7.2%
1950	215		−30.6%
1960	198		−7.9%
1970	182		−8.1%
1980	129		−29.1%
1990	115		−10.9%
2000	86		−25.2%
2010	47		−45.3%
2020	33		−29.8%
U.S. Decennial Census

=== 2010 census ===
As of the census of 2010, there were 47 people, 23 households, and 11 families residing in the town. The population density was 88.7 inhabitants per square mile (34.2/km^{2}). There were 40 housing units at an average density of 75.5 per square mile (29.2/km^{2}). The racial makeup of the town was 91.5% White, 4.3% Native American, and 4.3% from two or more races.

There were 23 households, of which 21.7% had children under the age of 18 living with them, 39.1% were married couples living together, 8.7% had a female householder with no husband present, and 52.2% were non-families. 34.8% of all households were made up of individuals, and 13% had someone living alone who was 65 years of age or older. The average household size was 2.04 and the average family size was 2.55.

The median age in the town was 49.5 years. 19.1% of residents were under the age of 18; 6.5% were between the ages of 18 and 24; 17% were from 25 to 44; 38.3% were from 45 to 64; and 19.1% were 65 years of age or older. The gender makeup of the town was 55.3% male and 44.7% female.

=== 2000 census ===
As of the census of 2000, there were 86 people, 39 households, and 28 families residing in the town. The population density was 160.8 inhabitants per square mile (62.1/km^{2}). There were 54 housing units at an average density of 100.9 per square mile (39.0/km^{2}). The racial makeup of the town was 98.84% White and 1.16% Native American.

There were 39 households, out of which 28.2% had children under the age of 18 living with them, 59.0% were married couples living together, 12.8% had a female householder with no husband present, and 28.2% were non-families. 25.6% of all households were made up of individuals, and 17.9% had someone living alone who was 65 years of age or older. The average household size was 2.21 and the average family size was 2.61.

In the town, the population was spread out, with 18.6% under the age of 18, 4.7% from 18 to 24, 14.0% from 25 to 44, 30.2% from 45 to 64, and 32.6% who were 65 years of age or older. The median age was 53 years. For every 100 females, there were 104.8 males. For every 100 females age 18 and over, there were 89.2 males.

The median income for a household in the town was $25,625, and the median income for a family was $37,500. Males had a median income of $47,500 versus $18,750 for females. The per capita income for the town was $16,135. There were 13.6% of families and 24.3% of the population living below the poverty line, including 37.5% of under eighteens and 17.2% of those over 64.
