= Samuel Hoffman Jr. House =

Historic house in Iowa, United States

- U.S. National Register of Historic Places
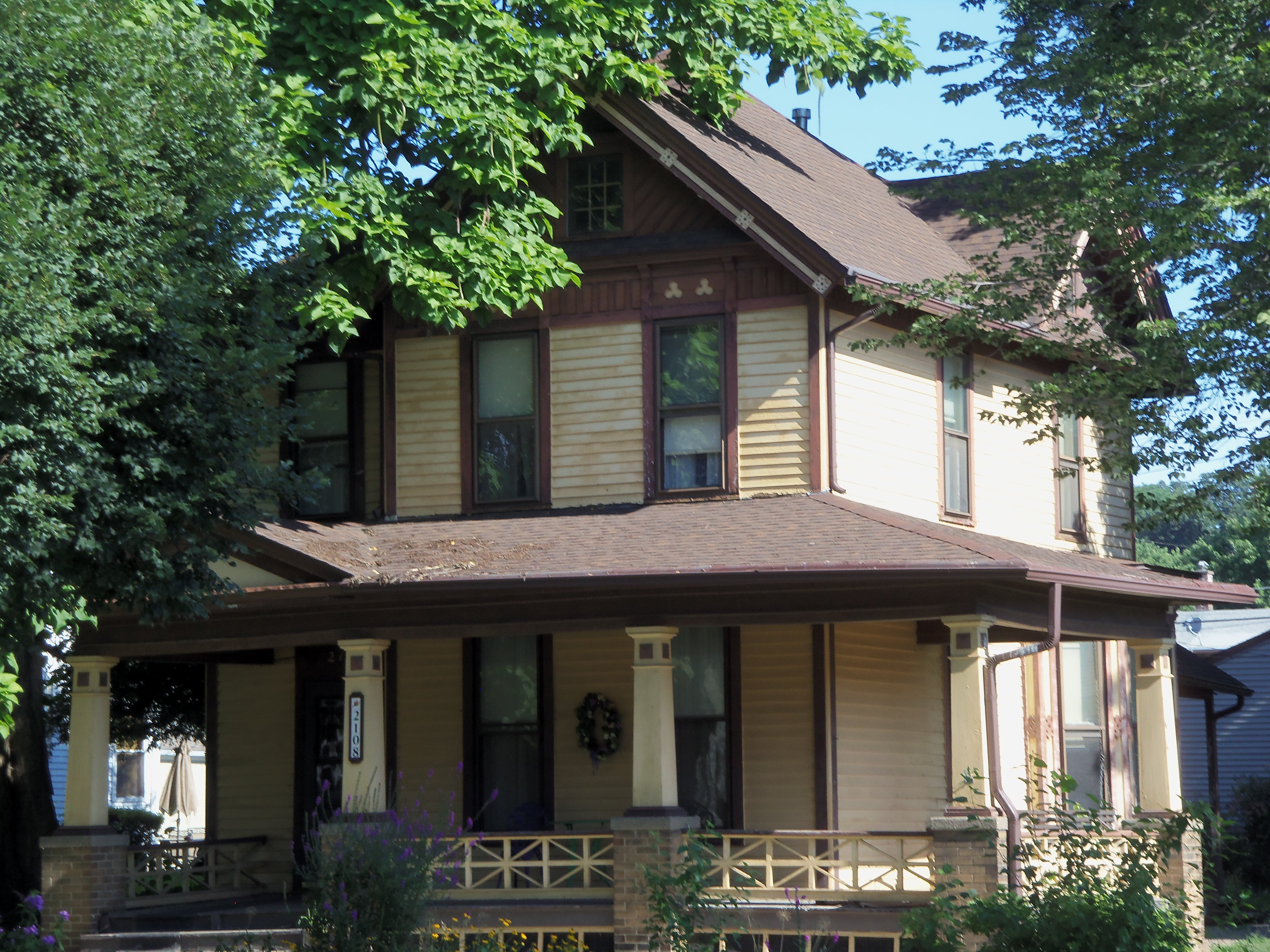

- Location within Iowa Location within the United States
- Location: 2108 W. 3rd St. Davenport, Iowa
- Coordinates: 41°31′21″N 90°36′35″W
- Area: less han one acre
- Built: 1915
- Architectural style: Stick-Eastlake
- MPS: Davenport MRA
- NRHP reference No.: 83002448
- Added to NRHP: July 7, 1983

The Samuel Hoffman Jr. House is a historic building located in the West End of Davenport, Iowa, United States. Samuel Hoffman Jr. was a bookkeeper at the German Savings Bank downtown. The house exhibits details of the Stick-Eastlake style such as the diagonal and short vertical stickwork on the gables. It also features molded bargeboards and decorative strips applied to the window on the east side. The porch, which is not original to the structure, features simple and geometric details that do not distract from the rest of the house. The residence has been listed on the National Register of Historic Places since 1983.
