= Mound builder (disambiguation) =

The Mound Builders were members of various indigenous North American cultures who constructed earthwork mounds.

Mound builder or mound builders may refer to:

- Southwestern Moundbuilders, athletic teams representing Southwestern College
- Mound-builder (bird), or megapode, birds in the family Megapodiidae
- Mound-building termites, a group of termite species that live in mounds
- Mound-building mouse or steppe mouse, a species of rodent
