= Eureka Municipal Airport (South Dakota) =

- IATA: none; ICAO: none; FAA LID: 3W8

Summary
- Airport type: Public
- Owner: City of Eureka
- Serves: Eureka, South Dakota
- Elevation AMSL: 1,935 ft (590 m)
- Coordinates: 45°47′59″N 099°38′34″W

Map
- Location of airport in South Dakota 3W8 (the United States)

Runways
Direction	Length		Surface
Direction	ft	m	Surface
12/30	3,100	945	Asphalt
7/25	1,821	555	Turf

Statistics (2022)
- Aircraft operations (year ending 4/20/2022): 580
- Source: Federal Aviation Administration

Eureka Municipal Airport (FAA LID: 3W8) is a city-owned, public-use airport located two nautical miles (4 km) north of the central business district of Eureka, a city in McPherson County, South Dakota, United States. It is included in the National Plan of Integrated Airport Systems for 2011–2015, which categorized it as a general aviation facility.

== Facilities and aircraft ==
Eureka Municipal Airport covers an area of 183 acres (74 ha) at an elevation of 1,935 feet (590 m) above mean sea level. It has two runways: 12/30 is 3,100 by 60 feet (945 x 18 m) with an asphalt surface and 7/25 is 1,821 by 150 feet (555 x 46 m) with a turf surface. For the 12-month period ending April 20, 2022, the airport had 580 general aviation aircraft operations, an average of 48 per month.

== See also ==
- List of airports in South Dakota
