= Eureka Municipal Airport (Kansas) =

Airport in Kansas, United States

- IATA: none; ICAO: none; FAA LID: 13K

Summary
- Airport type: Public
- Owner: City of Eureka
- Serves: Eureka, Kansas
- Elevation AMSL: 1,208 ft (368 m)
- Coordinates: 37°51′06″N 096°17′31″W

Map
- Location of airport in Kansas

Runways
Direction	Length		Surface
Direction	ft	m	Surface
8/26	2,146	654	Turf
18/36	3,504	1,068	Asphalt

Statistics (2008)
- Aircraft operations: 4,000
- Based aircraft: 12
- Source: Federal Aviation Administration

Eureka Municipal Airport (FAA LID: 13K), also known as Lt. William M. Milliken Airport, is a city-owned, public-use airport located two nautical miles (4 km) north of the central business district of Eureka, a city in Greenwood County, Kansas, United States. It is included in the National Plan of Integrated Airport Systems for 2011–2015, which categorized it as a general aviation facility.

== Facilities and aircraft ==
Eureka Municipal Airport covers an area of 148 acres (60 ha) at an elevation of 1,208 feet (368 m) above mean sea level. It has two runways: 18/36 is 3,504 by 60 feet (1,068 x 18 m), with an asphalt surface and 8/26 is 2,146 by 55 feet (654 x 17 m) with a turf surface.

For the 12-month period ending July 9, 2008, the airport had 4,000 general aviation aircraft operations, an average of 10 per day. At that time, there were 12 aircraft based at this airport: 92% single-engine and 8% multi-engine.

== See also ==
- List of airports in Kansas
