= Bowdle, South Dakota =

- City
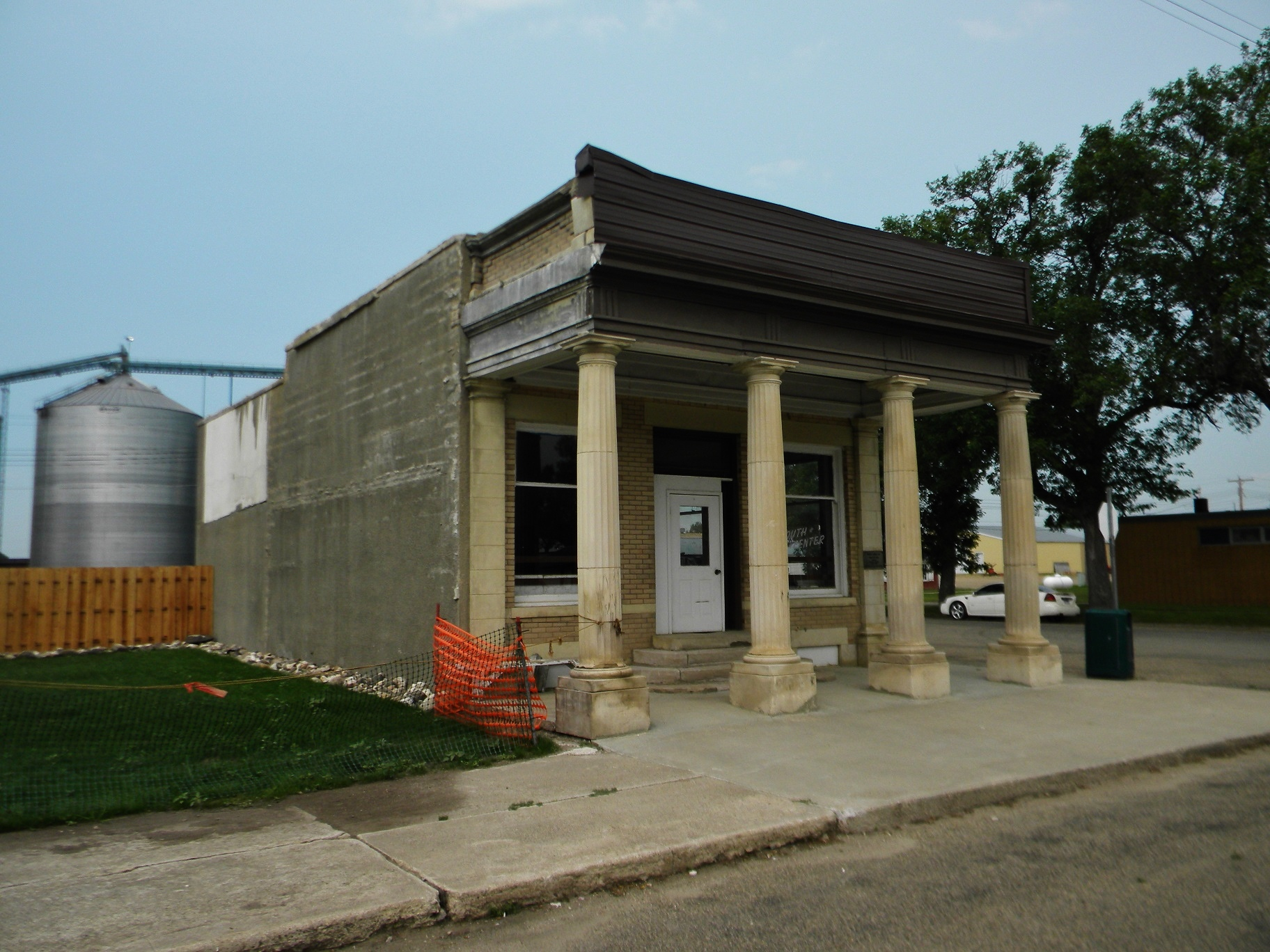
- Bank of Bowdle, July 2015
- Motto: "The Best Little Town In South Dakota"
- Location in Edmunds County and the state of South Dakota
- Coordinates: 45°27′05″N 99°39′23″W
- Country: United States
- State: South Dakota
- County: Edmunds
- Incorporated: 1911

Area
  - Total: 0.64 sq mi (1.66 km^{2})
  - Land: 0.64 sq mi (1.66 km^{2})
  - Water: 0 sq mi (0.00 km^{2})
- Elevation: 1,995 ft (608 m)

Population (2020)
  - Total: 470
  - Density: 733.8/sq mi (283.33/km^{2})
- Time zone: UTC-6 (Central (CST))
  - Summer (DST): UTC-5 (CDT)
- ZIP code: 57428
- Area code: 605
- FIPS code: 46-06540
- GNIS feature ID: 1267289
- Website: bowdlesd.com

Bowdle (/ˈbaʊdəl/) is a city in Edmunds County, South Dakota, United States. The population was 470 at the 2020 census.

== History ==
Bowdle was platted in 1886. Bowdle most likely derives its name from C.C. Bowdle, the pioneer banker in the city. However, other sources claim the name either comes from Alexander M. Bowdle, an employee for the Chicago & Milwaukee Railroad, or G.M. Bowdle, a pioneer settler of Mitchell.

On May 22nd, 2010, Bowdle was struck by an EF4 tornado. While no fatalities or injuries were reported, the tornado did damage several farms to the north of town along with tossing multiple vehicles. The tornado was part of a larger outbreak taking place from the 22nd to the 25th.

== Geography ==
According to the United States Census Bureau, the city has a total area of 0.64 square miles (1.66 km^{2}), all land.

== Demographics ==
Historical population
Census	Pop.	Note	%±
1900	622		—
1910	671		7.9%
1920	818		21.9%
1930	773		−5.5%
1940	757		−2.1%
1950	788		4.1%
1960	673		−14.6%
1970	667		−0.9%
1980	644		−3.4%
1990	589		−8.5%
2000	571		−3.1%
2010	502		−12.1%
2020	470		−6.4%
U.S. Decennial Census

=== 2020 census ===
As of the 2020 census, Bowdle had a population of 470. The median age was 57.2 years. 17.0% of residents were under the age of 18 and 36.2% of residents were 65 years of age or older. For every 100 females there were 100.9 males, and for every 100 females age 18 and over there were 96.0 males age 18 and over.

0.0% of residents lived in urban areas, while 100.0% lived in rural areas.

There were 188 households in Bowdle, of which 14.9% had children under the age of 18 living in them. Of all households, 53.7% were married-couple households, 21.8% were households with a male householder and no spouse or partner present, and 23.4% were households with a female householder and no spouse or partner present. About 40.4% of all households were made up of individuals and 18.6% had someone living alone who was 65 years of age or older.

There were 240 housing units, of which 21.7% were vacant. The homeowner vacancy rate was 3.5% and the rental vacancy rate was 12.1%.

Racial composition as of the 2020 census
Race	Number	Percent
White	442	94.0%
Black or African American	1	0.2%
American Indian and Alaska Native	10	2.1%
Asian	5	1.1%
Native Hawaiian and Other Pacific Islander	0	0.0%
Some other race	2	0.4%
Two or more races	10	2.1%
Hispanic or Latino (of any race)	11	2.3%

=== 2010 census ===
As of the census of 2010, there were 502 people, 225 households, and 128 families residing in the city. The population density was 784.4 inhabitants per square mile (302.9/km^{2}). There were 267 housing units at an average density of 417.2 per square mile (161.1/km^{2}). The racial makeup of the city was 96.0% White, 0.4% Native American, 0.2% Asian, 3.2% from other races, and 0.2% from two or more races. Hispanic or Latino of any race were 5.4% of the population.

There were 225 households, of which 26.7% had children under the age of 18 living with them, 49.3% were married couples living together, 4.9% had a female householder with no husband present, 2.7% had a male householder with no wife present, and 43.1% were non-families. 39.1% of all households were made up of individuals, and 24% had someone living alone who was 65 years of age or older. The average household size was 2.23 and the average family size was 3.02.

The median age in the city was 45.3 years. 24.3% of residents were under the age of 18; 7.5% were between the ages of 18 and 24; 18.2% were from 25 to 44; 24% were from 45 to 64; and 26.3% were 65 years of age or older. The gender makeup of the city was 49.6% male and 50.4% female.

=== 2000 census ===
As of the census of 2000, there were 571 people, 244 households, and 148 families residing in the city. The population density was 900.1 inhabitants per square mile (347.5/km^{2}). There were 283 housing units at an average density of 446.1 per square mile (172.2/km^{2}). The racial makeup of the city was 99.30% White, 0.18% African American, 0.18% Native American, 0.18% Asian, and 0.18% from two or more races.

There were 244 households, out of which 23.8% had children under the age of 18 living with them, 54.1% were married couples living together, 5.3% had a female householder with no husband present, and 39.3% were non-families. 37.7% of all households were made up of individuals, and 25.0% had someone living alone who was 65 years of age or older. The average household size was 2.19 and the average family size was 2.93.

In the city, the population was spread out, with 22.2% under the age of 18, 5.3% from 18 to 24, 19.1% from 25 to 44, 17.9% from 45 to 64, and 35.6% who were 65 years of age or older. The median age was 47 years. For every 100 females, there were 86.0 males. For every 100 females age 18 and over, there were 85.0 males.

The median income for a household in the city was $25,417, and the median income for a family was $34,091. Males had a median income of $23,750 versus $17,500 for females. The per capita income for the city was $14,756. About 12.3% of families and 16.3% of the population were below the poverty line, including 23.9% of those under age 18 and 16.5% of those age 65 or over.

== Transportation ==
Bowdle is served by two major highways:

- US 12 (U.S. Route 12)
- SD 47 (South Dakota Highway 47)

== See also ==
- List of cities in South Dakota
- Bowdle tornado
