= Clear Lake (Marshall County, South Dakota) =

Lake in the state of South Dakota, United States

- Location within South Dakota Location within the United States
- Location: Marshall County, South Dakota
- Coordinates: 45°41′37″N 97°21′34″W
- Type: lake
- Surface elevation: 1,821 feet (555 m)

Clear Lake is a lake in Marshall County, South Dakota, in the United States.

Clear Lake was descriptively named for its clear water.

The Clear Lake census-designated place comprises the residences and businesses which surround the lake.

== See also ==
- List of lakes in South Dakota
