= Roscoe, South Dakota =

- City
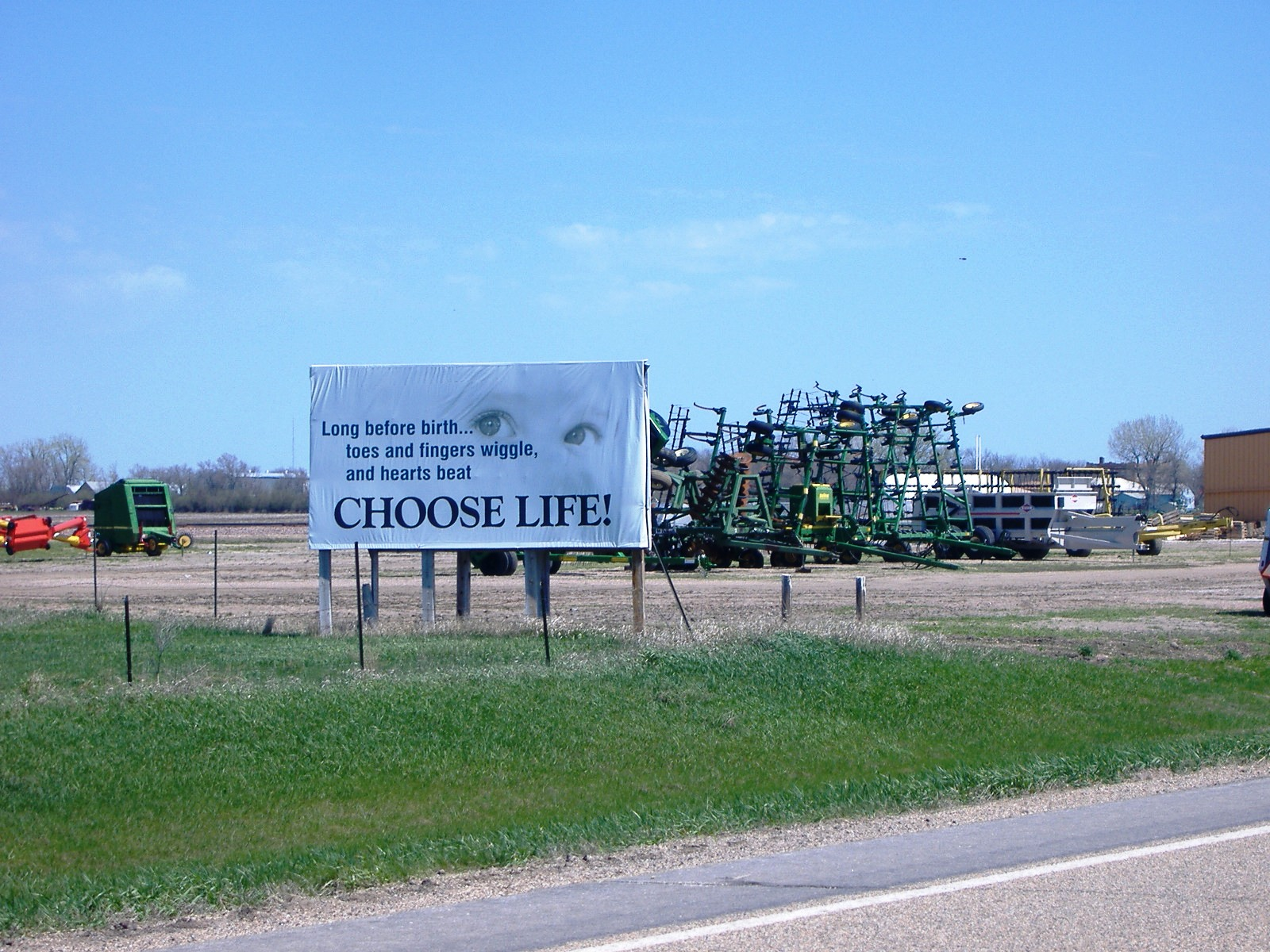
- Billboard and farmland in Roscoe, May 2007

- Location in Edmunds County and the state of South Dakota
- Coordinates: 45°27′00″N 99°20′12″W
- Country: United States
- State: South Dakota
- County: Edmunds
- Founded: 1877

Area
  - Total: 0.38 sq mi (0.99 km^{2})
  - Land: 0.38 sq mi (0.99 km^{2})
  - Water: 0 sq mi (0.00 km^{2})
- Elevation: 1,834 ft (559 m)

Population (2020)
  - Total: 269
  - Density: 704.2/sq mi (271.91/km^{2})
- Time zone: UTC-6 (Central (CST))
  - Summer (DST): UTC-5 (CDT)
- ZIP code: 57471
- Area code: 605
- FIPS code: 46-55820
- GNIS feature ID: 1267554
- Website: www.roscoesd.org

Roscoe is a city in central Edmunds County, South Dakota, United States. The population was 269 at the 2020 census.

Roscoe was laid out in 1877, and named in honor of Roscoe Conkling, a United States Senator from New York.

== Geography ==
According to the United States Census Bureau, the city has a total area of 0.47 square miles (1.22 km^{2}), all land.

=== Climate ===
Climate data for Roscoe, South Dakota (1991−2020 normals, extremes 1935−present)
Month	Jan	Feb	Mar	Apr	May	Jun	Jul	Aug	Sep	Oct	Nov	Dec	Year
Record high °F (°C)	59 (15)	68 (20)	83 (28)	94 (34)	102 (39)	107 (42)	112 (44)	108 (42)	102 (39)	93 (34)	77 (25)	62 (17)	112 (44)
Mean daily maximum °F (°C)	21.4 (−5.9)	26.1 (−3.3)	38.7 (3.7)	54.2 (12.3)	66.9 (19.4)	76.8 (24.9)	82.8 (28.2)	81.4 (27.4)	72.6 (22.6)	56.7 (13.7)	39.8 (4.3)	26.4 (−3.1)	53.7 (12.1)
Daily mean °F (°C)	12.3 (−10.9)	16.4 (−8.7)	28.3 (−2.1)	42.1 (5.6)	54.9 (12.7)	65.5 (18.6)	70.8 (21.6)	68.8 (20.4)	59.6 (15.3)	45.0 (7.2)	29.9 (−1.2)	17.8 (−7.9)	42.6 (5.9)
Mean daily minimum °F (°C)	3.2 (−16.0)	6.7 (−14.1)	17.9 (−7.8)	29.9 (−1.2)	43.0 (6.1)	54.2 (12.3)	58.7 (14.8)	56.2 (13.4)	46.6 (8.1)	33.3 (0.7)	19.9 (−6.7)	9.2 (−12.7)	31.6 (−0.2)
Record low °F (°C)	−37 (−38)	−34 (−37)	−24 (−31)	1 (−17)	17 (−8)	29 (−2)	38 (3)	36 (2)	21 (−6)	−2 (−19)	−19 (−28)	−35 (−37)	−37 (−38)
Average precipitation inches (mm)	0.54 (14)	0.66 (17)	0.95 (24)	1.84 (47)	3.16 (80)	3.70 (94)	3.24 (82)	2.30 (58)	1.91 (49)	1.79 (45)	0.69 (18)	0.64 (16)	21.42 (544)
Average snowfall inches (cm)	8.1 (21)	8.8 (22)	7.3 (19)	5.8 (15)	0.1 (0.25)	0.0 (0.0)	0.0 (0.0)	0.0 (0.0)	0.0 (0.0)	2.3 (5.8)	5.9 (15)	8.7 (22)	47.0 (119)
Average precipitation days (≥ 0.01 in)	6.9	6.6	6.6	8.1	10.7	11.8	9.9	8.0	7.4	7.4	5.5	6.2	95.1
Average snowy days (≥ 0.1 in)	7.3	6.9	4.6	2.4	0.1	0.0	0.0	0.0	0.0	1.3	3.7	6.7	33.0
Source: NOAA

== Demographics ==
Historical population
Census	Pop.	Note	%±
1890	114		—
1900	92		−19.3%
1910	357		288.0%
1920	459		28.6%
1930	491		7.0%
1940	608		23.8%
1950	726		19.4%
1960	532		−26.7%
1970	398		−25.2%
1980	370		−7.0%
1990	362		−2.2%
2000	324		−10.5%
2010	329		1.5%
2020	269		−18.2%
U.S. Decennial Census

=== 2020 census ===
As of the 2020 census, Roscoe had a population of 269. The median age was 40.5 years. 24.5% of residents were under the age of 18 and 21.6% of residents were 65 years of age or older. For every 100 females there were 89.4 males, and for every 100 females age 18 and over there were 89.7 males age 18 and over.

0.0% of residents lived in urban areas, while 100.0% lived in rural areas.

There were 128 households in Roscoe, of which 25.8% had children under the age of 18 living in them. Of all households, 45.3% were married-couple households, 22.7% were households with a male householder and no spouse or partner present, and 28.9% were households with a female householder and no spouse or partner present. About 41.5% of all households were made up of individuals and 22.7% had someone living alone who was 65 years of age or older.

There were 163 housing units, of which 21.5% were vacant. The homeowner vacancy rate was 0.0% and the rental vacancy rate was 10.0%.

Racial composition as of the 2020 census
Race	Number	Percent
White	245	91.1%
Black or African American	1	0.4%
American Indian and Alaska Native	5	1.9%
Asian	1	0.4%
Native Hawaiian and Other Pacific Islander	0	0.0%
Some other race	7	2.6%
Two or more races	10	3.7%
Hispanic or Latino (of any race)	14	5.2%

=== 2010 census ===
As of the census of 2010, there were 329 people, 153 households, and 83 families residing in the city. The population density was 700.0 inhabitants per square mile (270.3/km^{2}). There were 177 housing units at an average density of 376.6 per square mile (145.4/km^{2}). The racial makeup of the city was 97.0% White, 0.9% African American, 0.3% Native American, and 1.8% from two or more races. Hispanic or Latino of any race were 4.6% of the population.

There were 153 households, of which 26.1% had children under the age of 18 living with them, 45.8% were married couples living together, 3.9% had a female householder with no husband present, 4.6% had a male householder with no wife present, and 45.8% were non-families. 42.5% of all households were made up of individuals, and 24.8% had someone living alone who was 65 years of age or older. The average household size was 2.15 and the average family size was 2.95.

The median age in the city was 38.2 years. 26.1% of residents were under the age of 18; 8% were between the ages of 18 and 24; 21% were from 25 to 44; 21% were from 45 to 64; and 24% were 65 years of age or older. The gender makeup of the city was 47.1% male and 52.9% female.

=== 2000 census ===
As of the census of 2000, there were 324 people, 145 households, and 82 families residing in the city. The population density was 692.1 inhabitants per square mile (267.2/km^{2}). There were 167 housing units at an average density of 356.7 per square mile (137.7/km^{2}). The racial makeup of the city was 99.69% White, and 0.31% from two or more races. Hispanic or Latino of any race were 0.31% of the population.

There were 145 households, out of which 25.5% had children under the age of 18 living with them, 51.0% were married couples living together, 4.1% had a female householder with no husband present, and 42.8% were non-families. 38.6% of all households were made up of individuals, and 23.4% had someone living alone who was 65 years of age or older. The average household size was 2.23 and the average family size was 3.07.

In the city, the population was spread out, with 27.5% under the age of 18, 4.6% from 18 to 24, 24.7% from 25 to 44, 15.4% from 45 to 64, and 27.8% who were 65 years of age or older. The median age was 40 years. For every 100 females, there were 82.0 males. For every 100 females age 18 and over, there were 92.6 males.

The median income for a household in the city was $24,875, and the median income for a family was $36,250. Males had a median income of $27,500 versus $13,056 for females. The per capita income for the city was $16,451. About 2.9% of families and 8.9% of the population were below the poverty line, including none of those under age 18 and 13.8% of those age 65 or over.

A stone building in Roscoe, 1987

== Transportation ==
Roscoe is served by two major highways:

- US 12 (U.S. Route 12)
- SD 247 (South Dakota Highway 247)

== See also ==
- List of cities in South Dakota
