= Eureka, South Dakota =

Eureka
- City
- City of Eureka
- Location in McPherson County and the state of South Dakota
- Coordinates: 45°46′15″N 99°37′14″W
- Country: United States
- State: South Dakota
- County: McPherson
- Platted: October 3, 1887
- Incorporated: 1892

Government
  - Mayor: Wendy Brockel

Area
  - Total: 1.00 sq mi (2.59 km^{2})
  - Land: 0.93 sq mi (2.42 km^{2})
  - Water: 0.066 sq mi (0.17 km^{2})
- Elevation: 1,886 ft (575 m)

Population (2020)
  - Total: 813
  - Estimate (2022): 794
  - Density: 871.4/sq mi (336.45/km^{2})
- Time zone: UTC-6 (Central (CST))
  - Summer (DST): UTC-5 (CDT)
- ZIP code: 57437
- Area code: 605
- FIPS code: 46-20180
- GNIS feature ID: 1267384
- Website: eurekasd.com

Eureka is a city in western McPherson County, South Dakota, United States, near the North Dakota state line. The population was 813 at the 2020 census.

== History ==
Eureka was laid out in 1887, and named "Eureka", a Greek exclamation meaning "I have found it!" The area attracted German-Russian immigrants, who referred to the original settlement as “St. Petersburg.” The arrival of the railroad in 1887 spurred the town’s growth, and it became a major regional hub for wheat production. From 1887 to 1902, Eureka was known as the world’s wheat capital.

== Geography ==
According to the United States Census Bureau, the city has a total area of 1.00 square mile (2.59 km^{2}), of which 0.93 square miles (2.41 km^{2}) is land and 0.07 square miles (0.18 km^{2}) is water.

=== Climate ===
Climate data for Eureka, South Dakota (1991−2020 normals, extremes 1877−present)
Month	Jan	Feb	Mar	Apr	May	Jun	Jul	Aug	Sep	Oct	Nov	Dec	Year
Record high °F (°C)	58 (14)	67 (19)	85 (29)	96 (36)	107 (42)	107 (42)	114 (46)	109 (43)	107 (42)	94 (34)	78 (26)	62 (17)	114 (46)
Mean daily maximum °F (°C)	20.5 (−6.4)	25.0 (−3.9)	38.3 (3.5)	54.3 (12.4)	66.7 (19.3)	76.1 (24.5)	82.1 (27.8)	81.0 (27.2)	71.9 (22.2)	55.5 (13.1)	38.6 (3.7)	25.4 (−3.7)	52.9 (11.6)
Daily mean °F (°C)	11.2 (−11.6)	15.3 (−9.3)	27.9 (−2.3)	41.9 (5.5)	54.5 (12.5)	64.5 (18.1)	70.0 (21.1)	68.3 (20.2)	58.9 (14.9)	43.7 (6.5)	28.6 (−1.9)	16.6 (−8.6)	41.8 (5.4)
Mean daily minimum °F (°C)	1.8 (−16.8)	5.6 (−14.7)	17.5 (−8.1)	29.6 (−1.3)	42.2 (5.7)	52.8 (11.6)	57.8 (14.3)	55.6 (13.1)	45.9 (7.7)	31.9 (−0.1)	18.6 (−7.4)	7.8 (−13.4)	30.6 (−0.8)
Record low °F (°C)	−44 (−42)	−44 (−42)	−29 (−34)	−8 (−22)	12 (−11)	29 (−2)	32 (0)	29 (−2)	15 (−9)	−6 (−21)	−23 (−31)	−45 (−43)	−45 (−43)
Average precipitation inches (mm)	0.36 (9.1)	0.52 (13)	0.82 (21)	1.64 (42)	3.18 (81)	3.78 (96)	3.10 (79)	2.24 (57)	1.79 (45)	1.74 (44)	0.54 (14)	0.54 (14)	20.25 (514)
Average snowfall inches (cm)	6.9 (18)	7.6 (19)	8.5 (22)	4.7 (12)	0.0 (0.0)	0.0 (0.0)	0.0 (0.0)	0.0 (0.0)	0.0 (0.0)	2.0 (5.1)	6.3 (16)	8.3 (21)	44.3 (113)
Average precipitation days (≥ 0.01 in)	4.8	5.0	5.6	6.8	9.1	10.7	8.6	7.1	6.3	6.2	4.2	4.5	78.9
Average snowy days (≥ 0.1 in)	4.4	4.0	3.2	1.2	0.0	0.0	0.0	0.0	0.0	0.6	2.7	4.1	20.2
Source: NOAA

== Demographics ==
Historical population
Census	Pop.	Note	%±
1890	552		—
1900	961		74.1%
1910	961		0.0%
1920	1,200		24.9%
1930	1,308		9.0%
1940	1,457		11.4%
1950	1,576		8.2%
1960	1,555		−1.3%
1970	1,547		−0.5%
1980	1,360		−12.1%
1990	1,197		−12.0%
2000	1,101		−8.0%
2010	868		−21.2%
2020	813		−6.3%
2022 (est.)	794		−2.3%
U.S. Decennial Census; 2020 Census

=== 2020 census ===
As of the 2020 census, Eureka had a population of 813. The median age was 61.9 years, 15.7% of residents were under the age of 18, and 43.5% of residents were 65 years of age or older; for every 100 females there were 93.6 males, and for every 100 females age 18 and over there were 93.5 males.

0.0% of residents lived in urban areas, while 100.0% lived in rural areas.

There were 400 households in Eureka, of which 16.3% had children under the age of 18 living in them. Of all households, 40.8% were married-couple households, 28.3% were households with a male householder and no spouse or partner present, and 28.3% were households with a female householder and no spouse or partner present. About 46.1% of all households were made up of individuals and 26.8% had someone living alone who was 65 years of age or older.

There were 589 housing units, of which 32.1% were vacant. The homeowner vacancy rate was 3.2% and the rental vacancy rate was 17.7%.

Racial composition as of the 2020 census
Race	Number	Percent
White	757	93.1%
Black or African American	0	0.0%
American Indian and Alaska Native	11	1.4%
Asian	3	0.4%
Native Hawaiian and Other Pacific Islander	1	0.1%
Some other race	2	0.2%
Two or more races	39	4.8%
Hispanic or Latino (of any race)	11	1.4%

=== 2010 census ===
As of the 2010 census, there were 868 people, 452 households, and 240 families living in the city. The population density was 933.3 inhabitants per square mile (360.3/km^{2}). There were 649 housing units at an average density of 697.8 per square mile (269.4/km^{2}). The racial makeup of the city was 98.2% White, 0.2% Asian, and 1.6% from two or more races. Hispanic or Latino people of any race were 1.2% of the population.

There were 452 households, of which 13.9% had children under the age of 18 living with them, 43.6% were married couples living together, 6.2% had a female householder with no husband present, 3.3% had a male householder with no wife present, and 46.9% were non-families. 45.4% of all households were made up of individuals, and 31.4% had someone living alone who was 65 years of age or older. The average household size was 1.80 and the average family size was 2.45.

The median age in the city was 63.5 years. 13.2% of residents were under the age of 18; 2.3% were between the ages of 18 and 24; 9.6% were from 25 to 44; 27.3% were from 45 to 64; and 47.6% were 65 years of age or older. The gender makeup of the city was 43.5% male and 56.5% female.

=== 2000 census ===
As of the 2000 census, there were 1,101 people, 528 households, and 296 families living in the city. The population density was 1,178.5 inhabitants per square mile (455.0/km^{2}). There were 625 housing units at an average density of 669.0 per square mile (258.3/km^{2}). The racial makeup of the city was 99.00% White, 0.36% Native American, 0.27% Asian, and 0.36% from two or more races.

There were 528 households, out of which 15.5% had children under the age of 18 living with them, 50.6% were married couples living together, 3.4% had a female householder with no husband present, and 43.9% were non-families. 41.7% of all households were made up of individuals, and 29.2% had someone living alone who was 65 years of age or older. The average household size was 1.96 and the average family size was 2.64.

In the city, the population was spread out, with 15.5% under the age of 18, 4.4% from 18 to 24, 14.7% from 25 to 44, 20.0% from 45 to 64, and 45.4% who were 65 years of age or older. The median age was 61 years. For every 100 females, there were 81.4 males. For every 100 females age 18 and over, there were 80.9 males.

The median income for a household in the city was $19,826, and the median income for a family was $30,956. Males had a median income of $23,194 versus $17,000 for females. The per capita income for the city was $13,379. About 11.4% of families and 15.9% of the population were below the poverty line, including 6.5% of those under age 18 and 22.7% of those age 65 or over.

== Transportation ==
Eureka Municipal Airport is a city-owned, public-use airport located two nautical miles (4 km) north of the central business district of Eureka. It is also served by two state highways:

- SD 10 (South Dakota Highway 10)
- SD 47 (South Dakota Highway 47)

== Notable people ==
- Alice Bauer, former professional golfer, co-founder of the LPGA.
- Marlene Bauer Hagge, former professional golfer, winner of 26 LPGA Tour events, co-founder of the LPGA.
- Charles N. Herreid, Fourth Governor of South Dakota, Republican
- Charles Hoffman, Republican member of the South Dakota House of Representatives.
- Dean O. Mehlhaff, former Republican member of the South Dakota house of representatives.
- Al Neuharth, founder of USA Today, former chairman of Gannett Corp.
- Kitty O'Neil, former Hollywood stuntwoman and former landspeed recordholder
- Bill Scherr, former U.S. Olympic wrestler, bronze medalist in 1988 Summer Olympics.
- Jim Scherr, former U.S. Olympic wrestler and former U.S. Olympic Committee CEO.
- V. J. Smith, Author, motivational speaker, and former Republican politician.

== See also ==
- List of cities in South Dakota
