= Long Lake, South Dakota =

Long Lake mdé háŋska
- Town
- Long Lake, South Dakota
- Location in McPherson County and the state of South Dakota
- Coordinates: 45°51′24″N 99°12′21″W
- Country: United States
- State: South Dakota
- County: McPherson
- Incorporated: 1947

Area
  - Total: 0.28 sq mi (0.72 km^{2})
  - Land: 0.28 sq mi (0.72 km^{2})
  - Water: 0 sq mi (0.00 km^{2})
- Elevation: 1,952 ft (595 m)

Population (2020)
  - Total: 27
  - Density: 97/sq mi (37.6/km^{2})
- Time zone: UTC-6 (Central (CST))
  - Summer (DST): UTC-5 (CDT)
- ZIP code: 57457
- Area code: 605
- FIPS code: 46-38860
- GNIS feature ID: 1267464

Long Lake (Dakota: mdé háŋska; "lake long") is a town in McPherson County, South Dakota, United States. The population was 27 at the 2020 census.

The town took its name from the local Long Lake.

== Geography ==
According to the United States Census Bureau, the town has a total area of 0.28 square miles (0.73 km^{2}), all land.

== Demographics ==
Historical population
Census	Pop.	Note	%±
1950	175		—
1960	109		−37.7%
1970	128		17.4%
1980	117		−8.6%
1990	64		−45.3%
2000	58		−9.4%
2010	31		−46.6%
2020	27		−12.9%
U.S. Decennial Census; 2013 Estimate

=== 2010 census ===
As of the census of 2010, there were 31 people, 18 households, and 9 families residing in the town. The population density was 110.7 inhabitants per square mile (42.7/km^{2}). There were 47 housing units at an average density of 167.9 per square mile (64.8/km^{2}). The racial makeup of the town was 93.5% White and 6.5% Pacific Islander.

There were 18 households, of which 22.2% had children under the age of 18 living with them, 50.0% were married couples living together, and 50.0% were non-families. 50.0% of all households were made up of individuals, and 33.3% had someone living alone who was 65 years of age or older. The average household size was 1.72 and the average family size was 2.44.

The median age in the town was 54.8 years. 12.9% of residents were under the age of 18; 0.0% were between the ages of 18 and 24; 12.9% were from 25 to 44; 38.7% were from 45 to 64; and 35.5% were 65 years of age or older. The gender makeup of the town was 48.4% male and 51.6% female.

=== 2000 census ===
As of the census of 2000, there were 58 people, 29 households, and 12 families residing in the town. The population density was 210.0 inhabitants per square mile (81.1/km^{2}). There were 44 housing units at an average density of 159.3 per square mile (61.5/km^{2}). The racial makeup of the town was 100.00% White.

There were 29 households, out of which 20.7% had children under the age of 18 living with them, 37.9% were married couples living together, 6.9% had a female householder with no husband present, and 55.2% were non-families. 51.7% of all households were made up of individuals, and 34.5% had someone living alone who was 65 years of age or older. The average household size was 2.00 and the average family size was 3.15.

In the town, the population was spread out, with 27.6% under the age of 18, 8.6% from 18 to 24, 10.3% from 25 to 44, 24.1% from 45 to 64, and 29.3% who were 65 years of age or older. The median age was 48 years. For every 100 females, there were 100.0 males. For every 100 females age 18 and over, there were 82.6 males.

The median income for a household in the town was $11,563, and the median income for a family was $16,250. Males had a median income of $16,750 versus $11,250 for females. The per capita income for the town was $8,268. There were 53.8% of families and 60.0% of the population living below the poverty line, including 100.0% of under eighteens and 40.0% of those over 64.
