= Leola, South Dakota =

- City
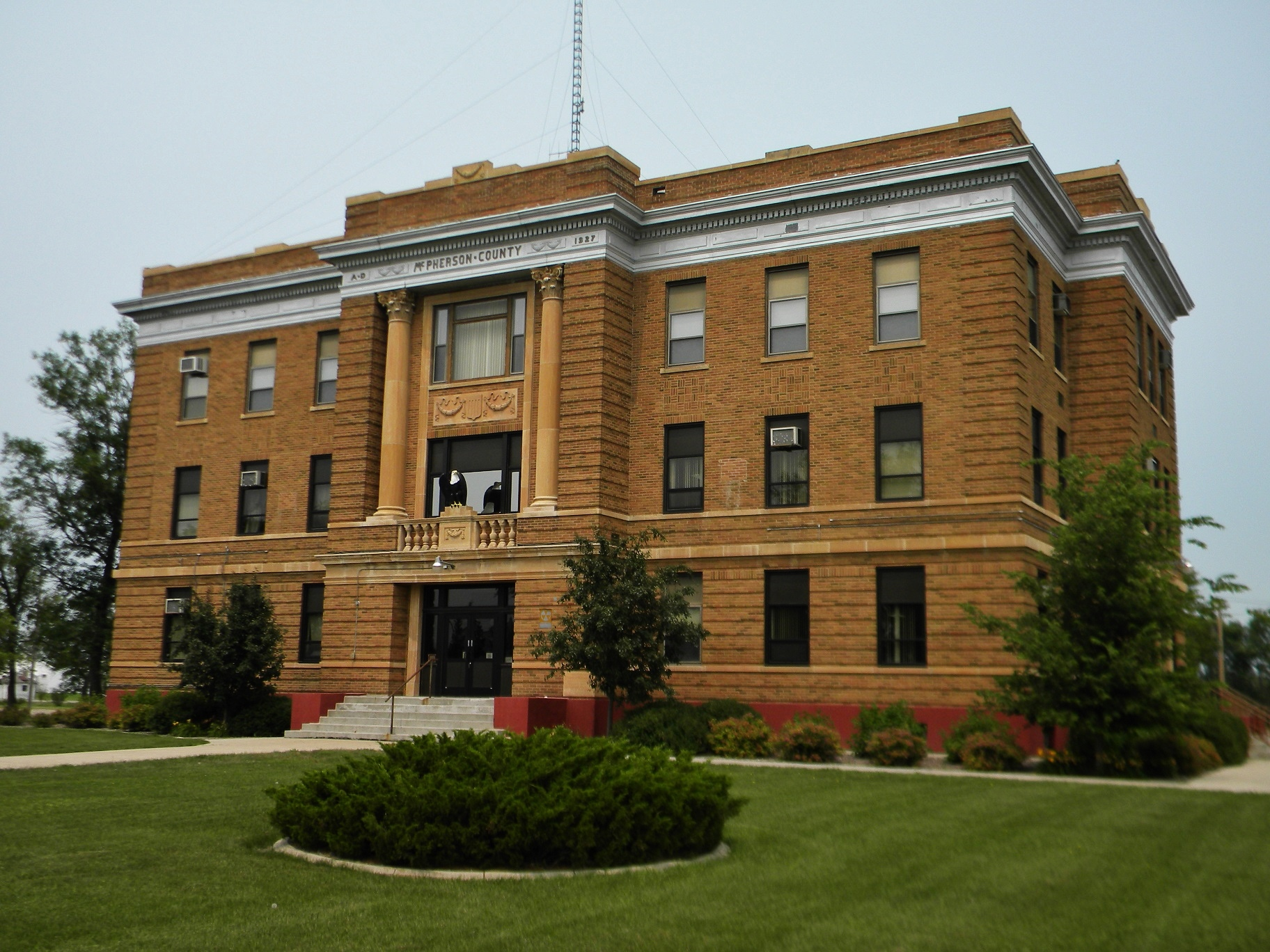
- McPherson County Courthouse, July 2015

- Location in McPherson County and the state of South Dakota
- Coordinates: 45°43′16″N 98°56′19″W
- Country: United States
- State: South Dakota
- County: McPherson
- Incorporated: 1919

Government
  - Type: Mayor-council
  - Mayor: Royce Erdmann

Area
  - Total: 0.75 sq mi (1.93 km^{2})
  - Land: 0.74 sq mi (1.92 km^{2})
  - Water: 0.0039 sq mi (0.01 km^{2})
- Elevation: 1,591 ft (485 m)

Population (2020)
  - Total: 434
  - Density: 585.0/sq mi (225.87/km^{2})
- Time zone: UTC-6 (Central (CST))
  - Summer (DST): UTC-5 (CDT)
- ZIP code: 57456
- Area code: 605
- FIPS code: 46-36460
- GNIS feature ID: 1267460
- Website: www.leolasd.com

Leola is a small city in and the county seat of McPherson County, South Dakota, United States. It was founded on May 1, 1884, and named for Leola Haynes, daughter of one of the town's founders. The population was 434 as of the 2020 census.

== Description ==
The city occupies an entirely rural area, and businesses and services include a grocery store a gas station-garage, restaurants and bars, a bank, a post office, a hotel, several small businesses (including farming supplies and equipment) and shops, grain elevators, local police and fire departments, and the county's public schools. The city is administered by a mayor-council form of government.

== Geography ==
According to the United States Census Bureau, the city has a total area of 0.73 square miles (1.89 km^{2}), of which 0.72 square miles (1.86 km^{2}) is land and 0.01 square miles (0.03 km^{2}) is water.

== Demographics ==
Historical population
Census	Pop.	Note	%±
1910	484		—
1920	637		31.6%
1930	724		13.7%
1940	795		9.8%
1950	772		−2.9%
1960	833		7.9%
1970	787		−5.5%
1980	645		−18.0%
1990	521		−19.2%
2000	462		−11.3%
2010	457		−1.1%
2020	434		−5.0%
U.S. Decennial Census

=== 2020 census ===
As of the 2020 census, Leola had a population of 434. The median age was 39.8 years. 27.0% of residents were under the age of 18 and 19.6% of residents were 65 years of age or older. For every 100 females there were 106.7 males, and for every 100 females age 18 and over there were 105.8 males age 18 and over.

0.0% of residents lived in urban areas, while 100.0% lived in rural areas.

There were 190 households in Leola, of which 26.3% had children under the age of 18 living in them. Of all households, 47.4% were married-couple households, 21.6% were households with a male householder and no spouse or partner present, and 24.7% were households with a female householder and no spouse or partner present. About 34.2% of all households were made up of individuals and 17.4% had someone living alone who was 65 years of age or older.

There were 228 housing units, of which 16.7% were vacant. The homeowner vacancy rate was 0.7% and the rental vacancy rate was 10.2%.

Racial composition as of the 2020 census
Race	Number	Percent
White	395	91.0%
Black or African American	1	0.2%
American Indian and Alaska Native	2	0.5%
Asian	0	0.0%
Native Hawaiian and Other Pacific Islander	0	0.0%
Some other race	23	5.3%
Two or more races	13	3.0%
Hispanic or Latino (of any race)	28	6.5%

=== 2010 census ===
As of the census of 2010, there were 457 people, 209 households, and 125 families residing in the city. The population density was 634.7 inhabitants per square mile (245.1/km^{2}). There were 258 housing units at an average density of 358.3 units per square mile (138.3 units/km^{2}). The racial makeup of the city was 96.3% White, 0.2% African American, 0.2% Native American, 0.2% Asian, and 3.1% from two or more races. Hispanic or Latino of any race were 2.0% of the population.

There were 209 households, of which 25.4% had children under the age of 18 living with them, 50.7% were married couples living together, 5.7% had a female householder with no husband present, 3.3% had a male householder with no wife present, and 40.2% were non-families. 36.8% of all households were made up of individuals, and 16.7% had someone living alone who was 65 years of age or older. The average household size was 2.19 and the average family size was 2.88.

The median age in the city was 43.1 years. 23.4% of residents were under the age of 18; 5.6% were between the ages of 18 and 24; 22.7% were from 25 to 44; 25.8% were from 45 to 64; and 22.5% were 65 years of age or older. The gender makeup of the city was 50.8% male and 49.2% female.

=== 2000 census ===
As of the census of 2000, there were 462 people, 234 households, and 135 families residing in the city. The population density was 651.2 inhabitants per square mile (251.4/km^{2}). There were 268 housing units at an average density of 377.7 units per square mile (145.8 units/km^{2}). The racial makeup of the city was 99.78% White and 0.22% Native American.

There were 234 households, out of which 18.8% had children under the age of 18 living with them, 51.3% were married couples living together, 3.0% had a female householder with no husband present, and 42.3% were non-families. 40.6% of all households were made up of individuals, and 21.4% had someone living alone who was 65 years of age or older. The average household size was 1.97 and the average family size was 2.64.

In the city, the population was spread out, with 18.6% under the age of 18, 4.8% from 18 to 24, 22.5% from 25 to 44, 23.2% from 45 to 64, and 31.0% who were 65 years of age or older. The median age was 48 years. For every 100 females, there were 93.3 males. For every 100 females age 18 and over, there were 88.0 males.

The median income for a household in the city was $24,559, and the median income for a family was $33,125. Males had a median income of $28,250 versus $22,321 for females. The per capita income for the city was $15,807. About 1.5% of families and 10.8% of the population were below the poverty line, including 9.4% of those under age 18 and 16.2% of those age 65 or over.

== Education ==
Leola School District is located in Leola, and it is a K-12 school district. This growing public school serves as the hub of many community based activities.

== Notable people ==
- Walter Conahan, a Republican South Dakota State Senator
- David N. Crouch, an independent member of the South Dakota House of Representatives.

== Notable locations ==
- The McPherson County Courthouse is listed on the National Register of Historic Places.

== See also ==
- List of cities in South Dakota
