= National Register of Historic Places listings in Day County, South Dakota =

Location of Day County in South Dakota

This is a list of the National Register of Historic Places listings in Day County, South Dakota.

This is intended to be a complete list of the properties and districts on the National Register of Historic Places in Day County, South Dakota, United States. The locations of National Register properties and districts for which the latitude and longitude coordinates are included below, may be seen in a map.

There are 12 properties and districts listed on the National Register in the county.

This National Park Service list is complete through NPS recent listings posted August 28, 2026.

== Current listings ==
	Name on the Register	Image	Date listed	Location	City or town	Description
1	James and Wilhelmina Anderson House		March 26, 2020 (#100005111)	216 Park Ave. 45°10′57″N 97°40′47″W	Lily	
2	Charles A. Barber Farmstead	Charles A. Barber Farmstead	February 8, 1988 (#88000048)	0.25 miles west of Lily; also 0.5 miles west of Lily, approximately 5 miles west of Highway 25; 45°10′56″N 97°41′32″W	Lily	Second set of boundaries represents a boundary increase
3	Chil and Julia Chilson House	Chil and Julia Chilson House	April 6, 2020 (#100005112)	120 West 8th Ave. 45°20′00″N 97°31′22″W	Webster	
4	Lars J. Fiksdal House	Lars J. Fiksdal House	March 23, 1995 (#95000279)	619 W. 1st St. 45°19′55″N 97°31′20″W	Webster	
5	First National Bank Building	First National Bank Building	June 22, 2005 (#05000626)	611 Main St. 45°20′01″N 97°31′13″W	Webster	
6	William Havens House	William Havens House	January 31, 1985 (#85000182)	915 E. 1st St. 45°19′36″N 97°31′07″W	Webster	
7	Anton and Mary Agnes Karpen House	Anton and Mary Agnes Karpen House	February 19, 2008 (#08000042)	818 1st St., W. 45°20′09″N 97°31′16″W	Webster	
8	Roslyn Auditorium	Roslyn Auditorium	February 9, 2001 (#01000097)	510 Main; 45°29′48″N 97°29′28″W	Roslyn	Houses the International Vinegar Museum.
9	Waddel Mansion	Waddel Mansion	June 3, 1994 (#94000564)	605 W. 5th St. 45°19′53″N 97°30′44″W	Webster	
10	Waldorf Hotel	Waldorf Hotel	September 13, 1979 (#79002401)	Main St. 45°24′43″N 97°54′13″W	Andover	Demolished in 2015
11	John and Kittie Williams House	John and Kittie Williams House	February 19, 2008 (#08000043)	1009 Main St. 45°20′15″N 97°31′14″W	Webster	
12	Zoar Norwegian Lutheran Church	Zoar Norwegian Lutheran Church	October 25, 1990 (#90001644)	7 miles east and 5 miles north of Grenville; 45°32′36″N 97°14′23″W	Grenville	

== See also ==
- List of National Historic Landmarks in South Dakota
- National Register of Historic Places listings in South Dakota
