= Karpen (disambiguation) =

Karpen is a village in Albania. Karpen may also refer to:

== People with the surname ==
- Andrew Karpen (1966–2025), American independent film distributor and movie executive
- Henry C. Karpen (1868–1936), American politician
- Judy Karpen (born 1953), American astrophysicist
- Nicolae Vasilescu-Karpen (1870–1964), Romanian engineer and physicist
- Richard Karpen (born 1957), American electronic music composer

== Other ==
- Anton and Mary Agnes Karpen House, a historic building in South Dakota
- Karpen House, a historic building in New York
- S. Karpen & Bros., American furniture manufacturer
