= Enemy Swim, South Dakota =

- Census-designated place
- Location within South Dakota Location within the United States
- Coordinates: 45°25′55″N 97°17′12″W
- Country: United States
- State: South Dakota
- County: Day

Area
  - Total: 1.51 sq mi (3.91 km^{2})
  - Land: 0.93 sq mi (2.42 km^{2})
  - Water: 0.58 sq mi (1.49 km^{2})
- Elevation: 1,870 ft (570 m)

Population (2020)
  - Total: 310
  - Density: 332/sq mi (128.1/km^{2})
- Time zone: UTC-6 (Central (CST))
  - Summer (DST): UTC-5 (CDT)
- ZIP Code: 57273 (Waubay)
- Area code: 605
- FIPS code: 46-19556
- GNIS feature ID: 2807099

Enemy Swim is an unincorporated community and census-designated place (CDP) on the Lake Traverse Indian Reservation in Day County, South Dakota, United States. The population was 310 at the 2020 census. It was first listed as a CDP prior to the 2020 census.

It is in the eastern part of the county, surrounding the west cove of Enemy Swim Lake and extending south to include the northwest shore of Campbell Slough. It is 8 miles (13 km) north of Waubay and 19 miles (31 km) by road northeast of Webster, the county seat.

== Demographics ==
Historical population
| Census | Pop. | Note | %± |
|---|---|---|---|
| 2020 | 310 | | — |
U.S. Decennial Census
