= Steve Kueter =

American football coach

Playing career
- 1973–1974: Dakota State
- Position: Fullback

Coaching career (HC unless noted)
- 1977: Webster High School
- 1978–1982: O'Gorman High School (assistant)
- 1983–2015: O'Gorman High School

Head coaching record
- Overall: 289–92–1

Accomplishments and honors

Championships
- As a coach: 7 SDHSAA 11AA (1985, 1986, 1988, 1991, 1993, 2004, 2005); 6 Greater Dakota Conference (1999, 2004, 2005, 2006, 2007, 2008); 5 Sioux Interstate Conference (1988, 1989, 1991, 1992, 1994); Northeast Conference (1977); As an athlete: SDIC (1973)

Awards
- DSU Athletics Hall of Fame; South Dakota Football Coaches Association Hall of Fame; South Dakota Coaches Association Hall of Fame; DSU Alumni Coach of the Year (1989)

Steve Kueter is a former American high school football coach. He was most recently the head coach for O'Gorman Catholic High School, a position he held from 1983 until 2015.

== Early life ==
Kueter graduated from West Central High School in Hartford, South Dakota in 1973. He then attended Dakota State College that following fall, where he was a member of the Dakota State Trojans football team. During the 1973 season, Dakota State won the South Dakota Intercollegiate Conference championship, which was their first conference championship in school history. In his sophomore year, Kueter broke his leg, which subsequently ended his playing career. He graduated from Dakota State in 1977.

== Coaching career ==
Following his graduation, Kueter spent one season as the head football coach at Webster High School in Webster, South Dakota. That season, the Bearcats finished in a three–way tie for first place in the Northeast Conference standings. The following season, he was hired as an assistant coach at O'Gorman High School in Sioux Falls, South Dakota under head coach Bob Burns. He was then promoted to head coach in 1983.

During his time at O'Gorman, Kueter led the Knights to seven state championships in 1985, 1986, 1988, 1991, 1993, 2004, and 2005. He also won eleven conference championships and accumulated an overall record of 289–92–1. At the time, his 289 wins was the record for a high school football coach in South Dakota.

Kueter retired from coaching following the 2015 season.

== Head coaching record ==
| Year | Team | Overall | Conference | Standing | Bowl/playoffs |
|---|---|---|---|---|---|
Webster High School (Northeast Conference) (1977)
| 1977 | Webster HS | 4–4–1 | | T–1st | |
| Webster HS: | | 4–4–1 | | | |
O'Gorman High School (Sioux Interstate Conference) (1983–1996)
| 1983 | O'Gorman HS | 7–3 | 4–2 | 3rd | L SDHSAA 11AA first round |
| 1984 | O'Gorman HS | 7–5 | 3–3 | 4th | L SDHSAA 11AA championship |
| 1985 | O'Gorman HS | 10–2 | 4–2 | 3rd | W SDHSAA 11AA championship |
| 1986 | O'Gorman HS | 10–2 | 5–1 | 2nd | W SDHSAA 11AA championship |
| 1987 | O'Gorman HS | 8–2 | 5–1 | 2nd | L SDHSAA 11AA first round |
| 1988 | O'Gorman HS | 12–0 | 6–0 | 1st | W SDHSAA 11AA championship |
| 1989 | O'Gorman HS | 9–2 | 6–0 | 1st | L SDHSAA 11AA semifinal |
| 1990 | O'Gorman HS | 9–3 | 4–2 | 2nd | L SDHSAA 11AA championship |
| 1991 | O'Gorman HS | 11–1 | 6–1 | 1st | W SDHSAA 11AA championship |
| 1992 | O'Gorman HS | 8–2 | 6–1 | 1st | L SDHSAA 11AA second round |
| 1993 | O'Gorman HS | 9–3 | 5–2 | 2nd | W SDHSAA 11AA championship |
| 1994 | O'Gorman HS | 10–1 | 7–0 | 1st | L SDHSAA 11AA semifinal |
| 1995 | O'Gorman HS | 7–2 | 6–1 | 2nd | L SDHSAA 11AA first round |
| 1996 | O'Gorman HS | 7–4 | 5–2 | 2nd | L SDHSAA 11AA semifinal |
O'Gorman High School (Greater Dakota Conference) (1997–2015)
| 1997 | O'Gorman HS | 5–5 | 4–3 | 2nd | L SDHSAA 11AA second round |
| 1998 | O'Gorman HS | 8–3 | 4–2 | 3rd | L SDHSAA 11AA semifinal |
| 1999 | O'Gorman HS | 11–2 | 6–1 | 1st | L SDHSAA 11AA championship |
| 2000 | O'Gorman HS | 6–4 | 5–2 | 3rd | L SDHSAA 11AA first round |
| 2001 | O'Gorman HS | 6–4 | 5–2 | 2nd | L SDHSAA 11AA first round |
| 2002 | O'Gorman HS | 7–3 | 6–1 | 2nd | L SDHSAA 11AA first round |
| 2003 | O'Gorman HS | 8–4 | 4–3 | 4th | L SDHSAA 11AA semifinal |
| 2004 | O'Gorman HS | 13–0 | 7–0 | 1st | W SDHSAA 11AA championship |
| 2005 | O'Gorman HS | 13–0 | 7–0 | 1st | W SDHSAA 11AA championship |
| 2006 | O'Gorman HS | 12–1 | 7–0 | 1st | L SDHSAA 11AA championship |
| 2007 | O'Gorman HS | 10–1 | 7–0 | 1st | L SDHSAA 11AA second round |
| 2008 | O'Gorman HS | 10–2 | 7–0 | 1st | L SDHSAA 11AA semifinal |
| 2009 | O'Gorman HS | 9–3 | 6–1 | 2nd | L SDHSAA 11AA semifinal |
| 2010 | O'Gorman HS | 9–4 | 4–3 | 3rd | L SDHSAA 11AA championship |
| 2011 | O'Gorman HS | 8–3 | 4–2 | 3rd | L SDHSAA 11AA semifinal |
| 2012 | O'Gorman HS | 7–4 | 4–2 | 2nd | L SDHSAA 11AA semifinal |
| 2013 | O'Gorman HS | 4–6 | 1–2 | 3rd | L SDHSAA 11AA semifinal |
| 2014 | O'Gorman HS | 6–4 | 1–2 | 3rd | L SDHSAA 11AA semifinal |
| 2015 | O'Gorman HS | 9–3 | 2–2 | T–2nd | L SDHSAA 11AA championship |
| O'Gorman HS: | | 285–88 | 163–46 | | |
| Total: | | 289–92–1 | | | |
^{#}Rankings from final Coaches Poll.
