= Sunflour Railroad =

The Sunflour Railroad (reporting mark SNR) is a short-line railroad which owns trackage in Roberts County and Marshall County, South Dakota. The company owns approximately 19 route-miles of track, between the towns of Rosholt and Claire City; the line connects with the Canadian Pacific Railway at Rosholt.

== History ==
The trackage, now owned by Sunflour, was originally constructed in 1913 by the Fairmount and Veblen Railway, a local shortline which extended from Fairmount, North Dakota to Grenville, South Dakota. The railway was soon purchased by the Soo Line Railroad, and operated as a branch line. The portion of the branch from Veblen to Grenville was abandoned in 1971. Sunflour purchased the Rosholt-Veblen trackage in 2000, after the Soo Line had requested permission to abandon that portion of the route. In 2012, the trackage from Veblen to Claire City was “abandoned”, even though the tracks and ties were removed years earlier.

== Current operations ==
The Sunflour Railroad apparently operated for only a short time, although the trackage remains intact in 2006. The railroad's only locomotive, an EMD SW1 switcher, currently rests on a siding at Victor, South Dakota. The line currently serves as railcar storage for other railroads.

== Name ==
The Sunflour Railroad was an optional name in the developing process for the monopoly board game, hence where it got its name.
