= Fairmount and Veblen Railway =

Overview
- Status: Some in use, some abandoned
- Owner: Fairmount and Veblen Railway (1913-1915); Soo Line (1915-2000); Sunflour Railroad (2000-current, west of Rosholt); Canadian Pacific (2000-current, north of Rosholt)
- Termini: Fairmount, North Dakota; Grenville, South Dakota

Service
- Type: Short-line railroad

History
- Opened: 12 November 1913
- Closed: 1971

The Fairmount and Veblen Railway (F&V) was a short line railroad that operated in Richland County, North Dakota; and in Roberts and Marshall counties, South Dakota.

The railroad was incorporated in December 1912 by C.A. Paulson of Minneapolis MN, Julius Rosholt, L.R. Roshall, George Anderson, and P.S. Hanson.

In 1913 the railroad constructed trackage from Fairmount, North Dakota southward into South Dakota to Rosholt, then westward to Claire City and Veblen. The line was extended southward the following year, from Veblen to Roslyn, and then eastward to Grenville. A steam locomotive acquired from the Minneapolis, St. Paul and Sault Ste. Marie Railway ("Soo Line") was used on the railroad.

The first meeting to discuss the possibility of such a line was held February 4, 1913 at Winans Hall in Harmon Township. Construction began in April 1913, and on November 12, 1913, the first train came through Rosholt. "(Rosholt) proposed that farmers along the right-of-way for the distance of roughly eight to ten miles on each side contribute $200 for each quarter section of land, either owned or farmed. The money was to be in the form of a loan, with the notes secured by a mortgage in the new railroad. By this means, Mr. Rosholt hoped to raise one-half the cost of building the railroad, with himself to furnish the balance." (Orlando Bjork, 1988 Rosholt-Victor History Book)

The town of Rosholt was named for Julius Rosholt, builder of the F&V, in appreciation for his fair dealings.

In 1915 the F&V was acquired by the Soo Line, and its trackage operated as a branch line by that railroad. The portion of the line between Veblen and Grenville was abandoned in 1971, and in 2000 the trackage between Rosholt and Veblen was sold to the newly formed Sunflour Railroad. Trackage north of Rosholt remained in use in 2006, operated by Canadian Pacific, the Soo Line's corporate successor.
