= Hans Rudolph, Incorporated =

Coordinates: 38.9756°N 94.8601°W

Hans Rudolph, Inc.
- Company type: privately owned for-profit company
- Industry: healthcare product manufacturer
- Founded: 1955, incorporated under current name in 1960
- Founder: Hans Rudolph
- Headquarters: 8325 Cole Parkway, Shawnee, Kansas, United States
- Area served: primarily serves markets in the United States, but has considerable foreign distribution
- Key people: Kevin Rudolph; (CEO); John Rudolph; (manager); Kelly Rudolph; (sales executive); John H. Rudolph; (chairman of the board)
- Number of employees: between 20 - 50
- Website: www.rudolphkc.com

Hans Rudolph, Incorporated, was founded by Hans Rudolph, who in 1938 began designing pulmonary function testing (PFT) equipment. One of his most successful devices was a PFT high velocity valve. Today, the company is a designer and manufacturer of various supplies and pieces of equipment used in various healthcare settings.

== History of company ==
Hans Rudolph, Inc., in its advertisements for some of its products, claims it got its start in 1938, when founder Hans Rudolph began designing PFT equipment. However, it later that Rudolph started what became Hans Rudolph, Inc. Hans Rudolph, the founder, moved to the Kansas City metropolitan area in 1941, and in 1955, began a partnership with Glade Ives to work on various pieces of equipment and to design new respiratory devices and parts. In 1955, the partnership ended and Rudolph started a machine shop in his basement, where he manufactured his high velocity valve. He produced other items in his shop.

In 1960, Hans and his son, John H. Rudolph incorporated the company under its present name and moved it to a much larger location, at 7200 Wyandotte, in Kansas City, Missouri. The company stayed there forty-six years. Hans and John worked on new equipment and improvements on existing equipment. They began designing continuous positive airway (CPAP) masks in the early 1980s. Hans' grandsons Kevin, Kelly and John later joined the company. They helped with equipment design and took leadership roles in the company. Hans died in 1994 and the first CPAP and bilevel PAP masks went into production only a few years earlier.

== Current status of the company ==
After founder Hans Rudolph died, his son John H. Rudolph headed Hans Rudolph, Inc., for a number of years. Hans' grandsons John, Kevin and Kelly managed the company when John H. retired from day-to-day company involvement. Since Hans died, the company has expanded its product line. In October 2007, the company was moved into a new building, its current location, in the Shawnee Mission area of Johnson County, Kansas. Johnson County is a well-to-do suburban county in the Kansas City metropolitan area.

For a number of years, Hans Rudolph, Inc., has produced devices and parts for CPAP/bilevel PAP equipment, PFT parts and devices, ventilator parts and equipment and anesthesia products. The company is well known in the respiratory and sleep medicine fields for its CPAP and bilevel PAP masks. The 7600 V2 full-face mask has since 2007 been well known. The company advertises its products in various respiratory and sleep medicine publications. Various suppliers carry the 7600 V2 mask. These include online companies, such as TheCPAPShop.com, DirectHomeMedical.com, CPAP Xchange.com, CPAP Supply USA, Medical Department Store.;
