= Waubay National Wildlife Refuge =

Wildlife refuge in South Dakota

- IUCN category IV (habitat/species management area)
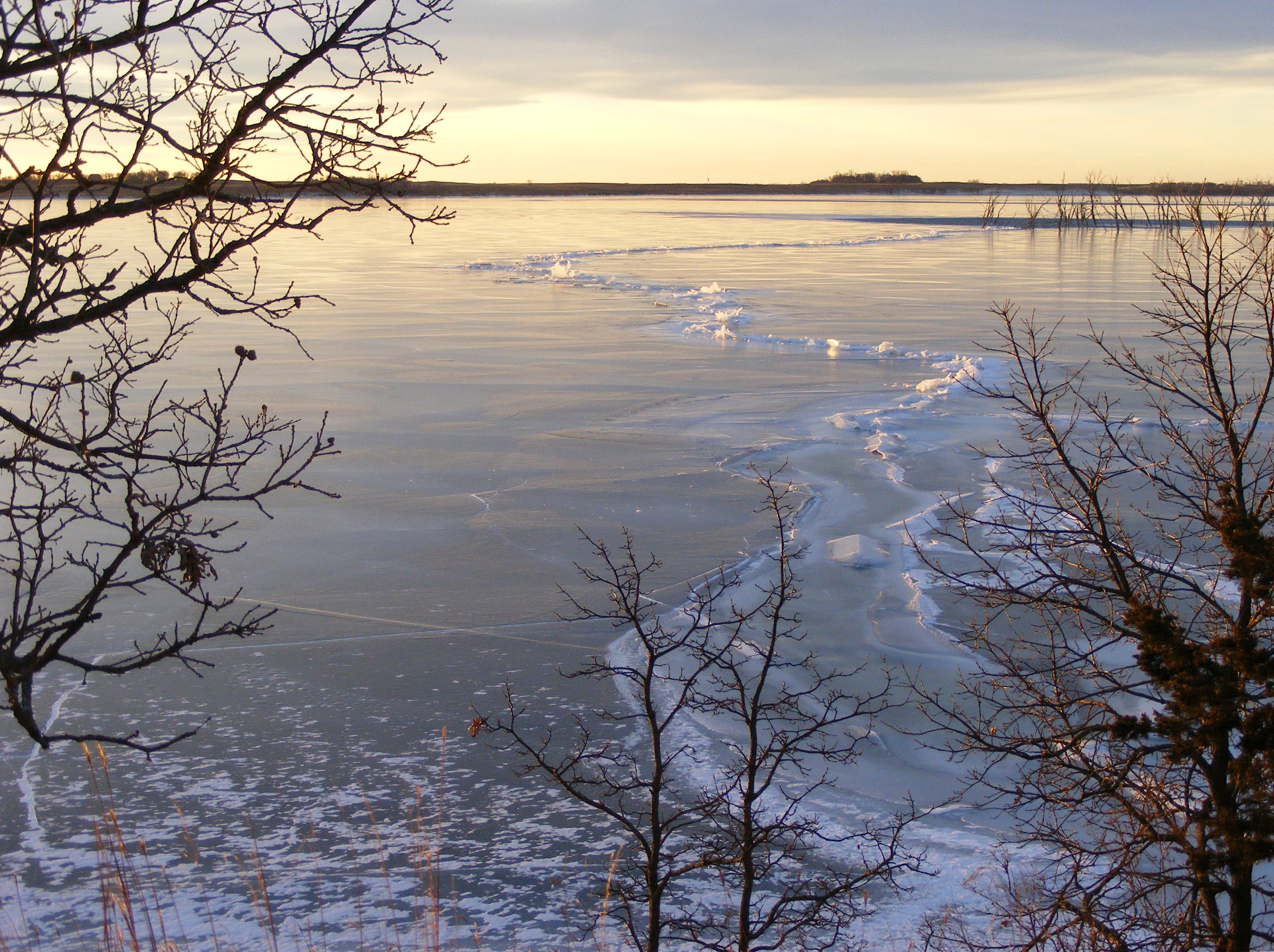

- Location within South Dakota Location within the United States
- Location: Day County, South Dakota, United States
- Nearest city: Waubay, South Dakota
- Coordinates: 45.42495°N 97.34092°W
- Area: 4,650 acres (18.8 km^{2})
- Established: 1935
- Governing body: U.S. Fish and Wildlife Service
- Website: Waubay National Wildlife Refuge

Waubay National Wildlife Refuge is a National Wildlife Refuge in South Dakota, United States. "Waubay" means "a place where numbers of birds make their nests" in the Dakota language. The Refuge encompasses 4,650 acres (18.8 km^{2}) of wetlands, native tallgrass prairie, and bur oak forest that provide a wide variety of nesting habitat for more than 100 species of waterfowl, song birds, and upland game birds as well as 140 additional bird species during migrations. Mammals include species from the ever-present white-tailed deer to the more elusive coyote and the diminutive pygmy shrew. The central location of Waubay National Wildlife Refuge in North America gives visitors the chance to see a mix of eastern, western, northern, and southern species.

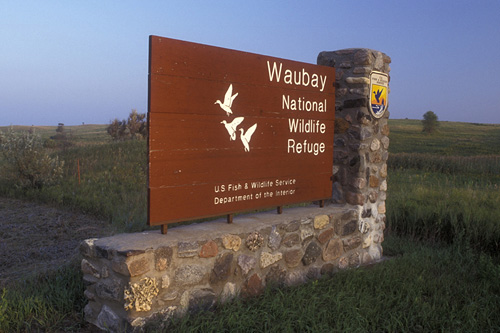
Entrance sign
