= Charles A. Barber Farmstead =

- U.S. National Register of Historic Places
- U.S. Historic district
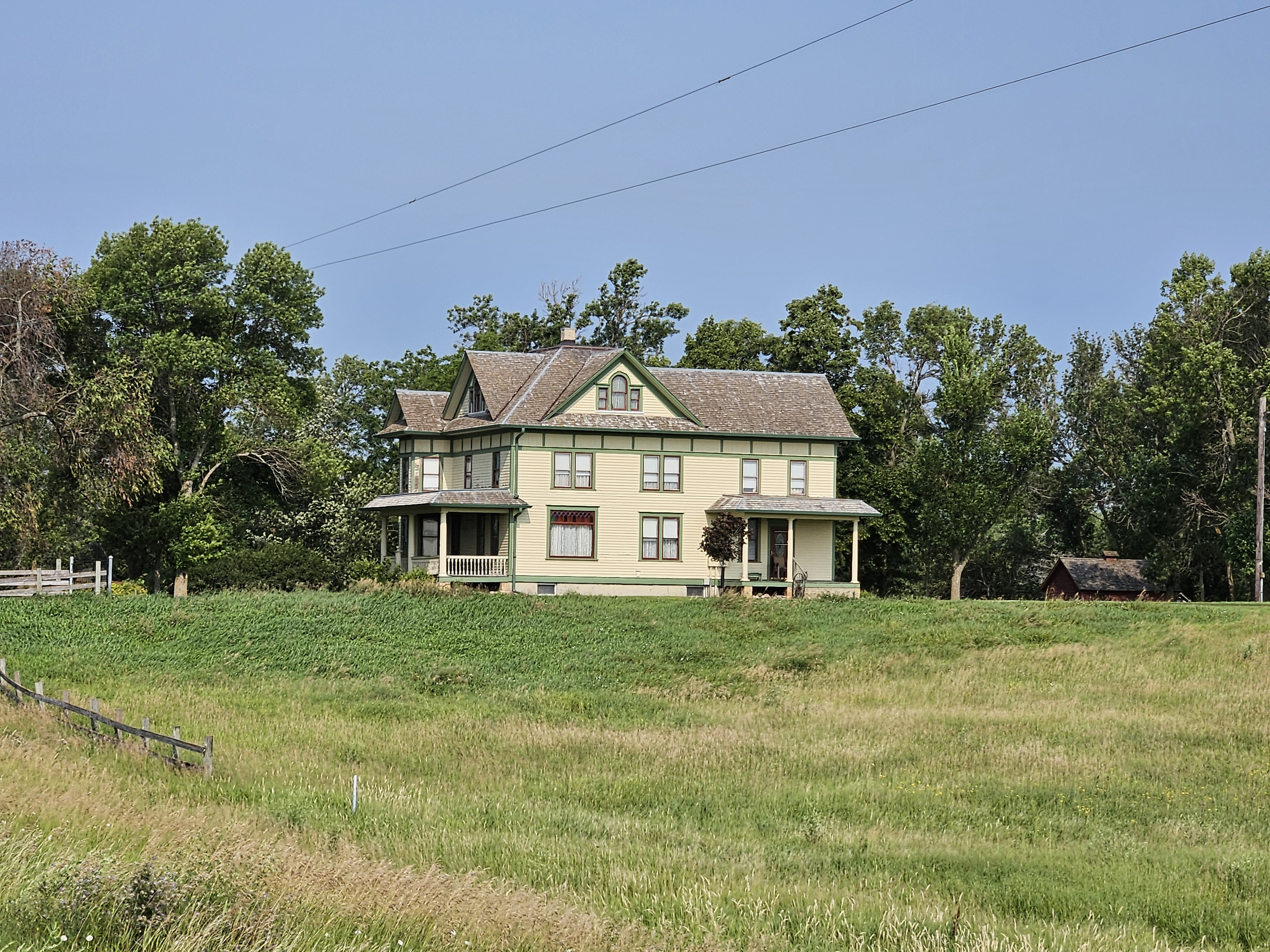

- Location within South Dakota Location within the United States
- Nearest city: Lily, South Dakota
- Area: 20 acres (8.1 ha)
- Built: 1900
- Architectural style: American Foursquare
- NRHP reference No.: 88000048 (original); 96001226 (increase)

Significant dates
- Added to NRHP: February 8, 1988
- Boundary increase: October 24, 1996

The Charles A. Barber Farmstead is a historic farmstead outside Lily, South Dakota. It consists of a complex of twelve buildings, including a house which was built in 1900 by the original homesteader, Charles Barber. The house is a fairly typical American Foursquare structure, which reached its present configuration by enlargement in 1914. Also included in the farmstead are an 1895 barn built by Berber, and several granaries moved to the property in the 1950s.

The property was listed on the National Register of Historic Places in 1988. The listing was expanded in 1996 to include a granary built by Barber, which is located on what is now a separate property across the street.

== History ==
One of the first homesteaders to the area was Mr. and Mrs. Franklin Barber and their children. The family immigrated from Mendota, Illinois in 1884. Franklin Barber initially ran the general store in Lily when he laid claim to the farmstead. In 1889, his son Charles Barber took over the claim and filed for a patent under the Timber Culture Act of 1878. Charles proved his claim in 1898 and was granted title to the parcel.

Charles constructed the barn in 1895 for a purebred horse-raising operation, where he bred Percheron horses until 1953.

In 1900, the Foursquare house was completed and was enlarged to its present size in 1914.

Charles died in 1962.
