= Webster School District (South Dakota) =

School district in South Dakota, United States

Address
- 102 East 9th Ave Webster, South Dakota, 57274; United States

District information
- Grades: Pre-school - 12
- Superintendent: Jim Block
- Enrollment: 483

Other information
- Telephone: (605) 345-3548
- Website: Webster School District

The Webster School District is a public school district in Day County, based in Webster, South Dakota.

== Schools ==
The Webster School District has one elementary school, one middle school, and one high school in one large building which is where the school district administrative office is.

=== Elementary schools ===
- Webster Elementary School

=== Middle school ===
- Webster Middle School

=== High school ===
- Webster High School (South Dakota)
