= William Havens House =

Historic house in South Dakota, United States

- U.S. National Register of Historic Places
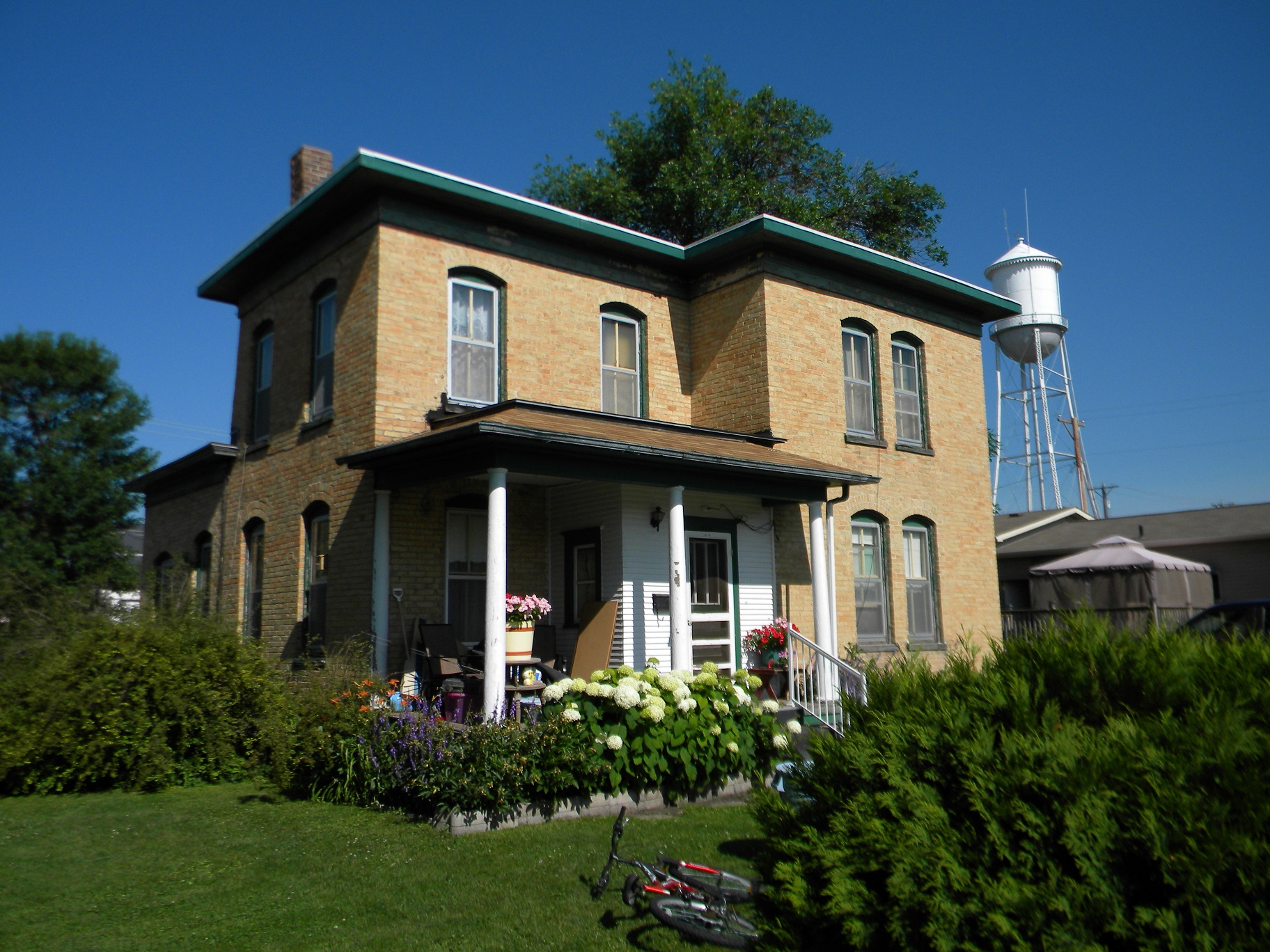

- Location within South Dakota Location within the United States
- Location: 915 E. 1st St., Webster, South Dakota
- Coordinates: 45°19′36″N 97°31′7″W
- Area: less than one acre
- Built: 1890
- Architect: Havens, William
- NRHP reference No.: 85000182
- Added to NRHP: January 31, 1985

The William Havens House is a historic house at 915 East 1st Street in Webster, South Dakota. It is a two-story brick structure, built in 1890 by William Havens, one of the area's first settlers, and was considered the most elegant house in the town at the time of its construction. The house is one of the only buildings in the area made from bricks fired at a local kiln, which was only in operation for a short time. William Havens homesteaded the area in 1885, and served as Webster's first postmaster.

The house was listed on the National Register of Historic Places in 1985.
