= Lars J. Fiksdal House =

Historic house in South Dakota, United States

- U.S. National Register of Historic Places
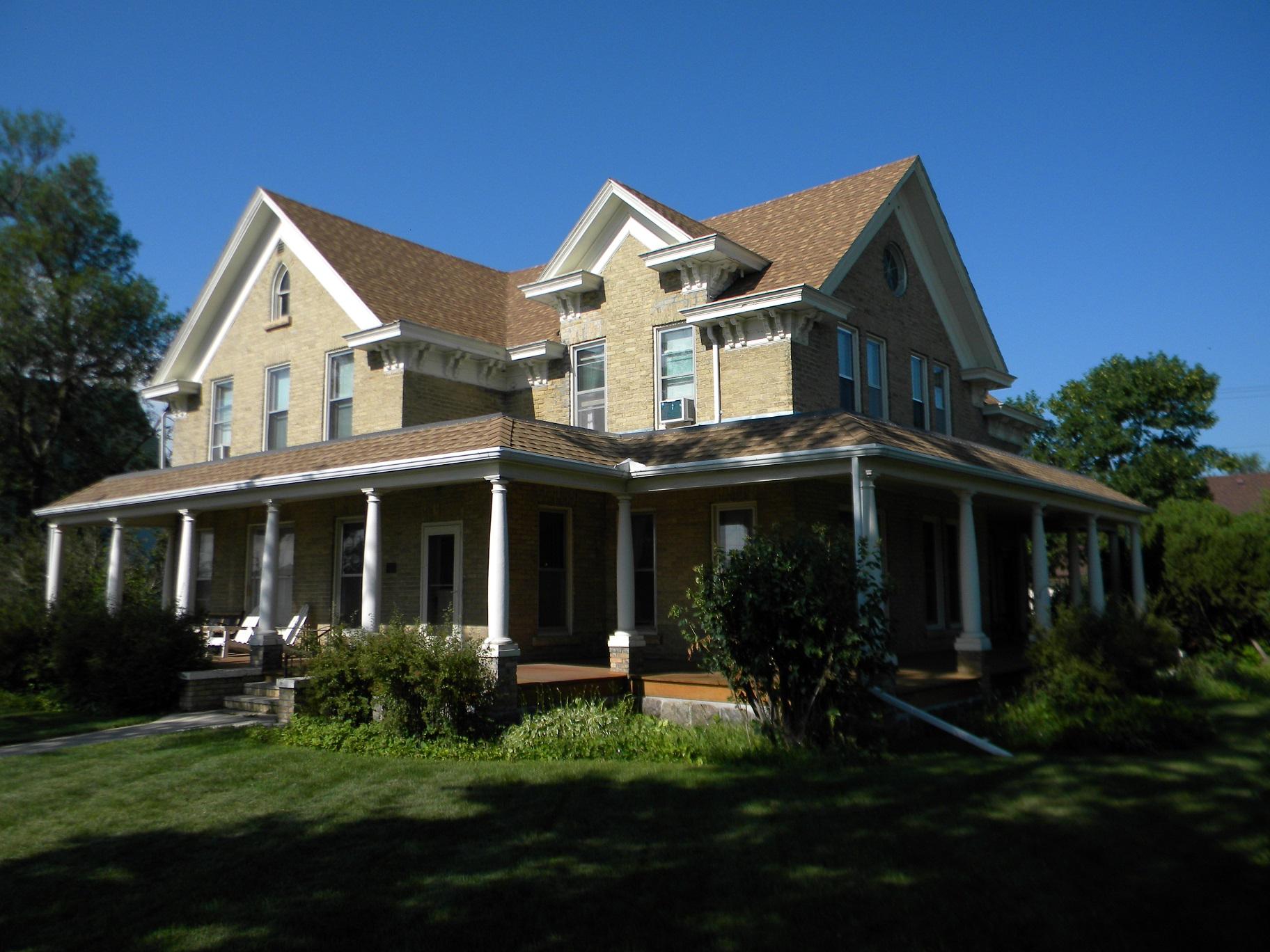

- Location within South Dakota Location within the United States
- Location: 619 W. First St., Webster, South Dakota
- Coordinates: 45°19′55″N 97°31′20″W
- Area: less than one acre
- Built: 1899
- Architectural style: Late Victorian, late 19th and 20th century Revivals, Eclectic
- NRHP reference No.: 95000279
- Added to NRHP: March 23, 1995

The Lars J. Fiksdal House is a historic house at 619 West 1st Street in Webster, South Dakota. It is an architecturally eclectic 2 1/2-story structure, faced in brick, which was built in several stages. The oldest portion of the house was built in 1881, and reached its present appearance by 1899. It exhibits elements of a wide variety of architectural style, with asymmetrical and irregular Queen Anne massing, a Colonial Revival wraparound porch, and Gothic Revival arched windows in some of its gable ends. The main roof cornice features heavy Italianate brackets. Many of the later alterations the house were made by Lars Fiksdal, a Norwegian immigrant. The house was converted into apartments in 1937, and is also known as the Fiksdal Apartment House.

The house was listed on the National Register of Historic Places in 1995.
