= John and Kittie Williams House =

Historic house in South Dakota, United States

- U.S. National Register of Historic Places
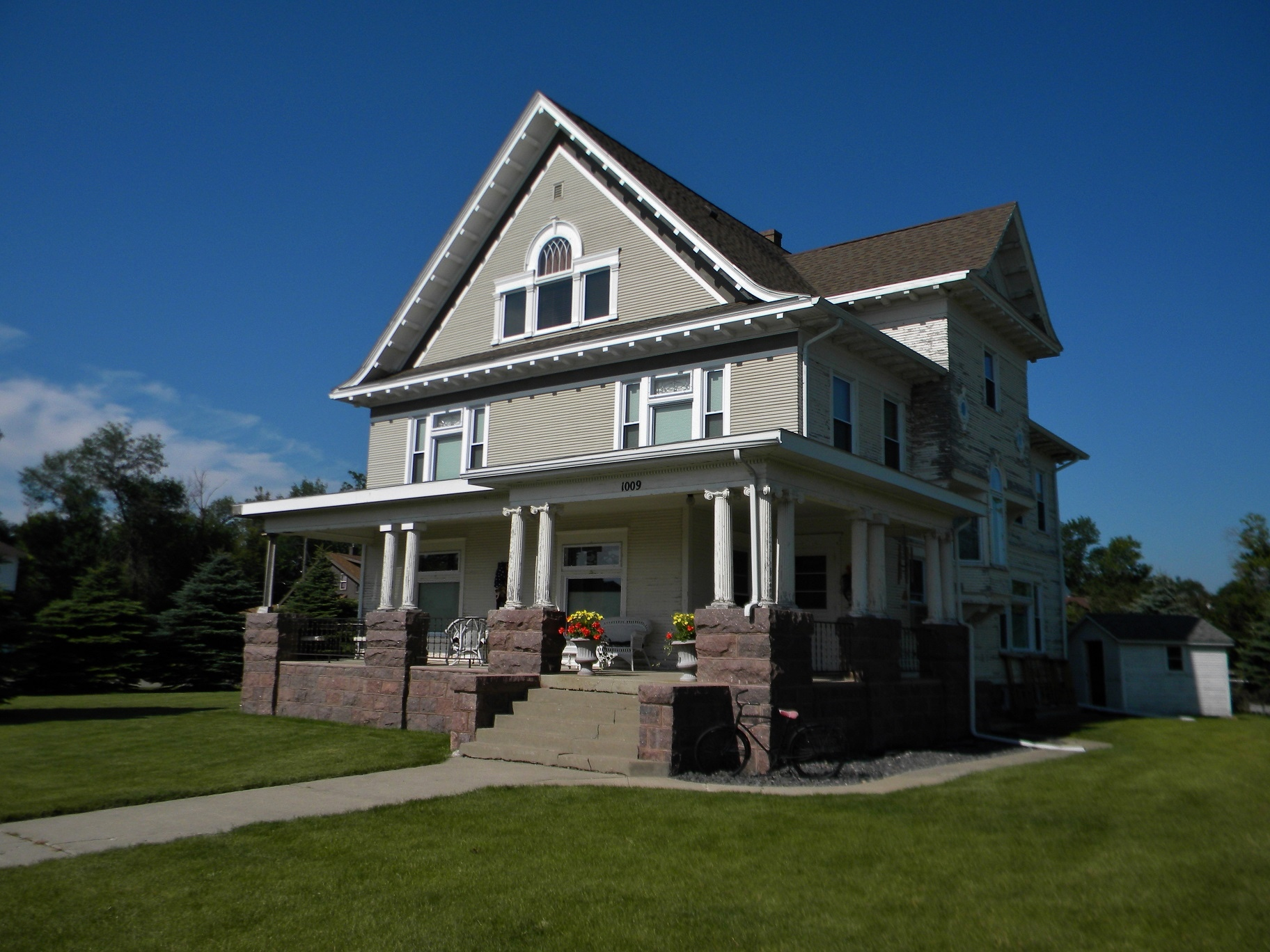

- Location within South Dakota Location within the United States
- Location: 1009 Main St., Webster, South Dakota
- Coordinates: 45°20′15″N 97°31′14″W
- Area: less than one acre
- Built: 1909
- Architectural style: Queen Anne
- NRHP reference No.: 08000043
- Added to NRHP: February 19, 2008

The John and Kittie Williams House is a historic house at 1009 Main Street in Webster, South Dakota. It is a 2 1/2-story wood-frame structure, built c. 1909, and is now, as it was then, one of the grandest houses in the small community. It is a Queen Anne Victorian in style, with a variety of gable projections on the roof, projecting bay sections, and porches. The interior has elaborate Classical Revival woodwork, with Corinthian columns, wainscoting, and builtin cabinets.

The house was listed on the National Register of Historic Places in 2008.
