= Zhenjiang Vinegar Culture Museum =

Museum in Zhenjiang, Jiangsu, China

- 中国镇江醋文化博物馆
- Established: 2010
- Location: Zhenjiang, China
- Coordinates: 32°6′17.47″N 119°28′27.77″E

Zhenjiang Vinegar Culture Museum (Chinese: 中国镇江醋文化博物馆) is a museum dedicated to vinegar in Yicheng Subdistrict, Dantu District, Zhenjiang, Jiangsu, China. It is located in Zhenjiang, a city famous for its Zhenjiang vinegar. It is an AAAA Tourist attraction.

The museum documents the history of vinegar production, contains a recreation of an ancient vinegar workshop, and also documents the modern vinegar production process.

== History ==
The museum opened in 2010, built by Hengshun Group and becoming the first museum in Zhenjiang dedicated to preserving historical culture.

== See also ==
- International Vinegar Museum
