= Holmquist, South Dakota =

Unincorporated community in South Dakota, U.S.

Coordinates: 45°20′22″N 97°39′11″W

Holmquist is an unincorporated community in Day County, in the U.S. state of South Dakota.

== History ==
A post office called Holmquist was established in 1898, and remained in operation until 1963. The community has the name of Peter Holmquist, an early homesteader.
