= Crandall, South Dakota =

Unincorporated community in South Dakota, U.S.

Coordinates: 45°09′19″N 97°57′20″W

Crandall is an unincorporated community in Day County, in the U.S. state of South Dakota.

== History ==
A post office called Crandall was established in 1908, and remained in operation until 1973. The community was named for Walter S. Crandell, the relative of a railroad official (a recording error accounts for the error in spelling, which was never corrected).
