= First National Bank (Webster, South Dakota) =

- First National Bank Building
- U.S. National Register of Historic Places
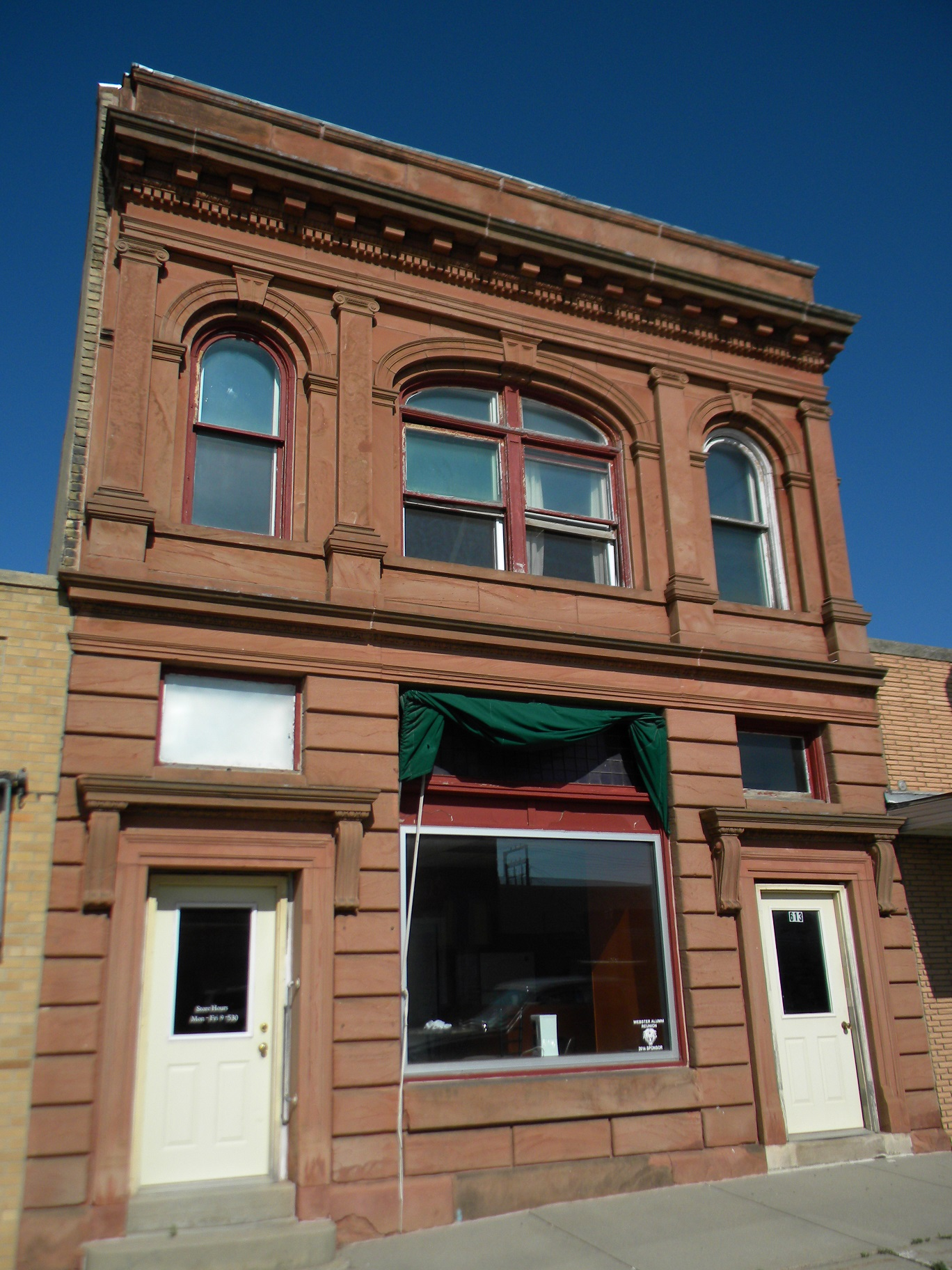

- Location within South Dakota Location within the United States
- Location: 611 Main St., Webster, South Dakota
- Coordinates: 45°20′1″N 97°31′13″W
- Area: less than one acre
- Built: 1903
- Architectural style: Italianate
- NRHP reference No.: 05000626
- Added to NRHP: June 22, 2005

The First National Bank is a historic bank building at 611 Main Street in Webster, South Dakota. Built in 1903, it is a two-story structure, made of brick with limestone veneer. It is an excellent local example of commercial Italianate architecture, with narrow round-arch windows with molded hood surrounds, decorative crowns above the doorways, and pilasters on the second floor. It is also historically significant as the third bank established in Day County.

The building was listed on the National Register of Historic Places in 2005.
