= Hans Rudolph =

Hans Rudolph (November 17, 1903 – February 1994), was a pioneer in the development of respiratory equipment and supplies.

Hans Rudolph, born in Frankfurt, Germany, became a mechanical apprentice and attended vocational school there to learn his chosen trade. In October 1923 he emigrated to Rosholt, South Dakota. He helped on his uncle's farm and in September 1924 moved to St. Louis, where he worked in a machine shop. Two years later he was hired by a machine shop in Chicago and he studied electronics, earning a diploma in the subject. He married Elizabeth Wilke, also from Germany, and they began raising a family.

In June 1930 the Rudolphs moved to Kansas City, where Hans worked in another machine shop. In February 1932 Rudolph started work as an instrument maker for the physiology department of Indiana University. He stayed with this position until June 1941. It was there he designed and produced, in 1938, a high velocity valve for pulmonary function testing. He then produced a machine to record PFT results on paper.

Rudolph returned to Kansas City in June 1941 and spent the rest of his life there. He serviced and repaired research equipment for public schools, laboratories and universities. He kept working with respiratory valves, as well. From 1945 to 1955 he went into partnership with Glade Ives. Their company was named Multiform.

In 1955 the partnership ended and Rudolph started a machine shop in his basement. He received numerous orders for his high velocity valve and he built other equipment.

In 1961 Hans and his son, John Rudolph, incorporated the company as Hans Rudolph, Inc. They moved out of the basement and to 7200 Wyandotte, Kansas City, Missouri. The company operated at that location for 46 years. On the day of October 19, 2007 they moved into the newly built World Headquarters at 8325 Cole Parkway, Shawnee, KS 66227.

As the years went by, Hans Rudolph designed and patented more respiratory equipment and concentrated on his respiratory line. John and Hans began design work on masks for continuous positive airway pressure (CPAP) machines in the early 1980s. CPAPs aid those with obstructive and central sleep apnea, so they may get adequate sleep.

Hans Rudolph's grandsons, Kevin Rudolph and Kelly Rudolph, joined the business after graduating from university programs. Kevin and others worked on a mouth face mask for the CPAP machine and the mask was patented in 1991. It is ironic that production of CPAP masks did not begin until near the very end of Hans Rudolph's life.

Elizabeth died in 1987. Hans worked for his company up to the very end of his 90 years. In fact, he worked the day he died.

Hans Rudolph left quite a legacy in the design and production of respiratory equipment and supplies. Hans, John, Kevin and Kelly built upon the research of Hans to design CPAP and BIPAP (bilevel positive airway pressure) masks to allow persons with sleep apnea to get better rest and maintain better health. In recent years, CPAP and BIPAP have been proven to help with a number of ailments, aside from sleep apnea.

In the years since Hans died, Hans Rudolph, Inc., has expanded its line of CPAP and BIPAP masks and improved upon them. The company also has developed accessories for masks and has marketed equipment for pulmonary function studies, ventilator equipment, and various connectors for CPAP/BIPAP circuits (allowing for the flow of supplemental oxygen and other gases). The company has in addition developed a line of anesthesia products.
