= Enemy Swim Lake =

Lake in the state of South Dakota, United States

- Enemy Swim Lake is a small lake at the top right-hand corner of the map, on the right to a larger, more visible, lake. Enemy Swim Lake (the United States)
- Location: Waubay Township, Day and Roberts counties, Lake Traverse Indian Reservation, South Dakota, United States
- Coordinates: 45.4394°N 97.2662°W
- Basin countries: United States
- Surface elevation: 1,854 ft (565 m)

Enemy Swim Lake is a lake in the glacial lake region of northeastern South Dakota located on the Lake Traverse Indian Reservation in Day County, United States. Its coordinates are 45.4394°N 97.2662°W and the elevation is 1,854 feet (565 meters).

Enemy Swim Lake's name is an accurate preservation of its native Sioux name, recalling an incident when Native Americans had to swim across the lake to escape their enemy.

Enemy Swim Lake contains several freshwater fish species. These include walleye, northern pike, largemouth bass, crappie, and bluegill. Yellow perch and bullhead are also present.

Fish in Enemy Swim Lake are found in both shallow and deep areas. Shallow zones contain vegetation and support species like bass and bluegill. Deeper water is used by walleye and northern pike. Structures such as rocks and drop-offs provide additional habitat. Fish move between these areas as needed.

Enemy swim lake has a maximum depth of 27 feet. The lake includes shallow flats and deeper sections. Depth affects temperature and oxygen levels. Shallow areas warm faster than the deeper areas. Fish adjust their location based on these conditions.

Fish activity changes throughout the year in Enemy Swim Lake. Walleye and crappie are more active in cooler water. Bass and bluegill are more active in the warmer water. Seasonal changes affect feeding and movement. Fish shift locations on based on water temperature. These patterns help maintain balance in the lake.

== See also ==
- List of lakes in South Dakota

== Sources ==
- Fishing Works
- Business Directory
- South Dakota Glacial Lakes
