= Merritt H. Day =

Dakotas settler, lawyer, militia leader (1844–1900)

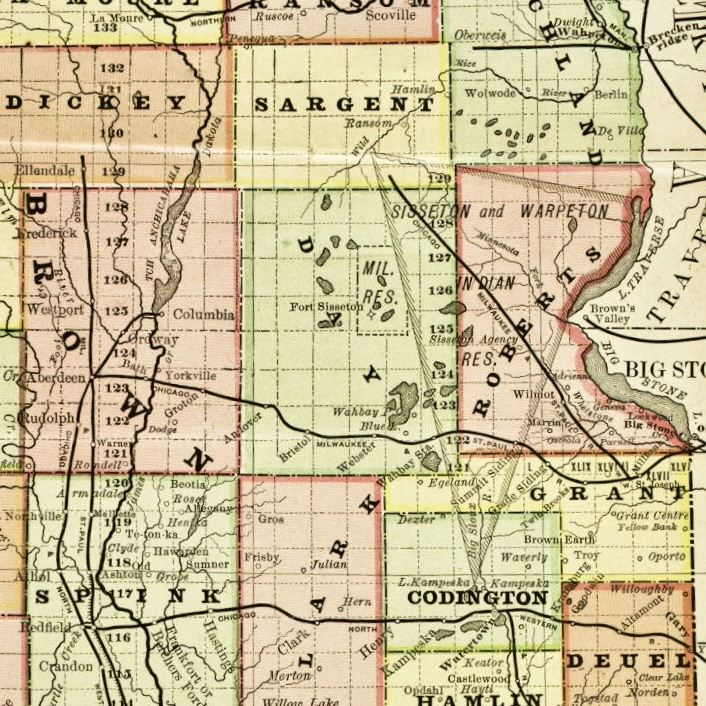
Map of Day County, Dakota Territory in 1883

Merritt Horace Day (August 27, 1844 – May 4, 1900), sometimes called Col. M.H. Day, was an early pioneer, rancher, mine owner, and legislator in the Dakota Territory. Merritt Day was a "pronounced advocate for the division of Dakota," into the separate U.S. states of North Dakota and South Dakota, and Day County, South Dakota, is named in his honor. Day was commander of an irregular state militia in South Dakota during the Ghost Dance War. During the lead-up to what is now known as the Wounded Knee Massacre, "Col. Day" was issued hundreds of rifles and thousands of rounds of ammunition by the state governor, which he distributed to the 60 to 200 men of the Spring Creek Volunteers. These civilians are estimated to have killed between 12 and 18 Lakota in mid-December 1890, "kinsmen, brothers, or sons of the Lakota seeking refuge on Stronghold."

== Professional ==
His biography as reported in the 1926 History of Day County, South Dakota:

The Territorial legislature of 1879 made a re-division of all the Counties of the Territory. In most cases these counties were re-named in honor of distinguished men of the Territory. ¶ This County was named in honor of Councilman Merritt H. Day, from Bon Homme County. (A councilman was a member of the upper house of the Territorial legislature.) ¶ Mr. Day settled in the Dakota Territory just after the close of the Civil War, in which he had served with distinction, being discharged as a captain of a Wisconsin regiment. During the Sioux outbreak at Pine Ridge, he exhibited the qualities of statesman, diplomat, and soldier combined. Rapid City was in a panic when Captain Day took charge of the situation, organizing a company of volunteers. He patrolled the surrounding country, erected temporary forts for the protection of stockmen and sent messengers to confer with the hostile Sioux. Conditions soon improved and the people returned to their homes. Who knows what slaughter and bloodshed may have been averted? This sturdy pioneer died at his home in Rapid City, leaving a large vacant place in his city and state. It is with a mingled feeling of pride and pleasure that we accept for our County the name of so honorable a pioneer.

— Louis G. Ochsenreiter, HISTORY OF DAY COUNTY, 1873 to 1926

=== Early years ===
During the American Civil War, Merritt H. Day served with the 11th Regiment of the Wisconsin Infantry from 1861 to 1865, rising to the rank of corporal. He fought in the Vicksburg Campaign and was wounded at the Battle of Fort Gibson.

In 1872, the Day family settled in Brule County in the Dakota Territory, which he helped to organize. M.H. Day was Registrar of Deeds for Brule County from 1874 to 1876.

He moved, in 1876, to Springfield, Bonne Homme County, Dakota.

He was admitted to the Bar in 1879 and was a member of the Legislative Council of the Dakota Territory during 1879 and 1881 representing Scotland/Swan Lake, South Dakota. When Day County was organized by the territorial legislature in 1880 it was named in Day's honor.

He may have joined the Grand Army of the Republic in 1885 at the age of 39. In his GAR record he was said to be an attorney at Sioux Falls, South Dakota.

In 1886, he was elected as the Democratic National Committee member representing Dakota. He was subsequently an unsuccessful Democratic candidate for territorial delegate to Congress, although remaining as a state senator. His primary opponent in the territorial delegate election of 1888 was Governor Church. (According to one report on Church's relationship with Grover Cleveland, "Day was a southern Dakotan from Bon Homme County who also engaged in Black Hills mining. Day represented the territory's old-line, rank-and-file Democrats who had long favored division and statehood. He had been under consideration for the gubernatorial appointment in 1887 but withdrew his name, supposedly with the tacit understanding of Cleveland and Church that he would become territorial auditor. The appointment never materialized, and political rivalry between the two men escalated." Day ultimately led an attempt to impeach Church.)

=== Spring Creek Volunteers ===
Merritt H. Day organized a militia called the Spring Creek Volunteers in the southern Black Hills during what settlers then called Messiah War or the Sioux Uprising, but is now called the Ghost Dance War.

The Last Days of the Sioux Nation described the original group as "sixty-two ranchers and cowboys mustered by Col. H. M. [sic] Day into the South Dakota militia...spoiling for a fight." U.S. Army officers in the area corresponded with "Col. M. H. Day" and dictated their area of patrol.

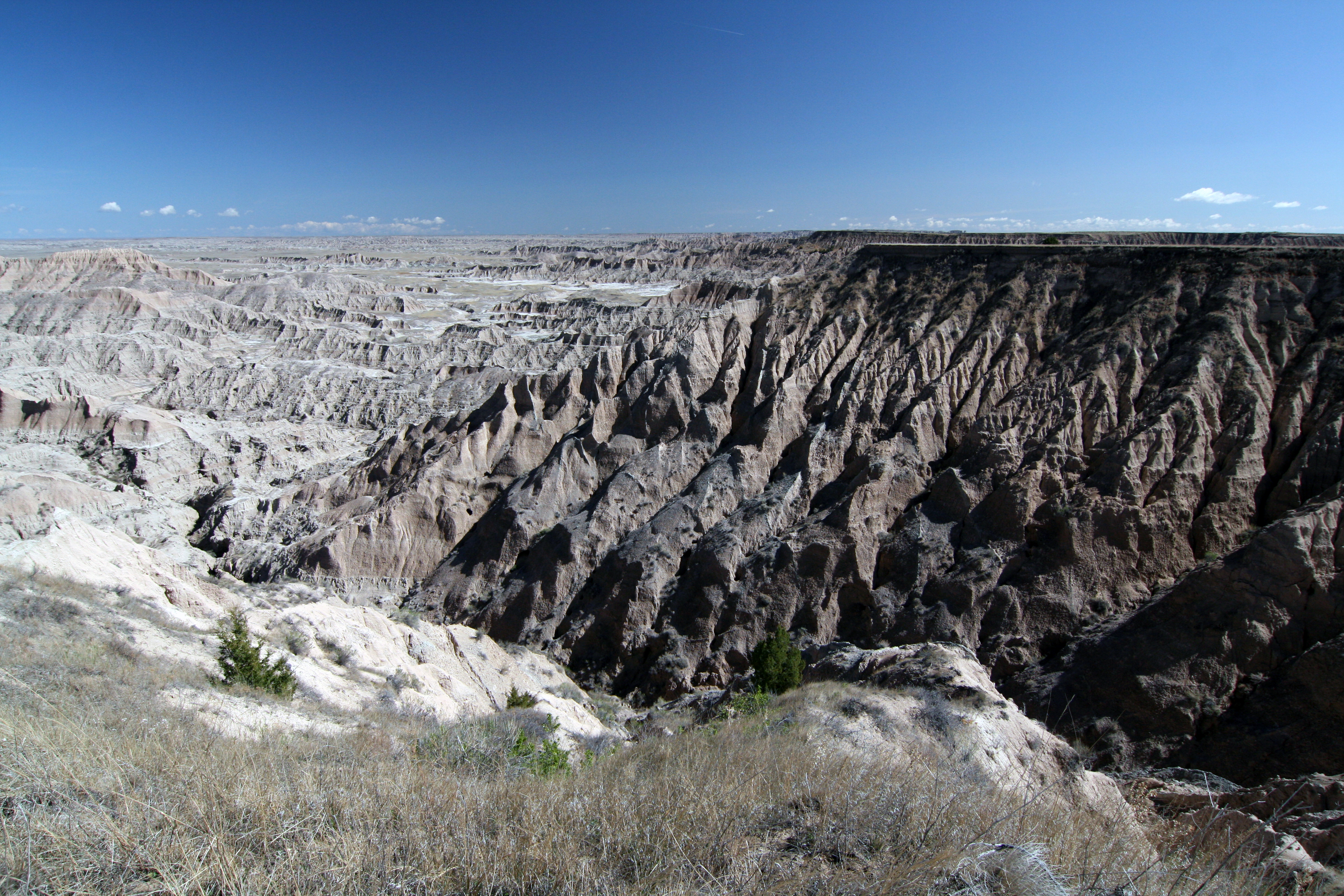
Members of Day's militia instigated an attack on a Lakota settlement of approximately 100 tepees in an encampment below Stronghold Table in what is now Badlands National Park

Gov. Arthur C. Mellette sent Day one hundred rifles and 5,000 cartridges for those guns on December 6, 1890. Mellette appointed Day "aide-de-camp" responsible for the "[Black] Hills campaign" and asked him to coordinate with the mayor of Rapid City. After Sitting Bull was shot and killed, Mellette sent Day another 200 rifles and 7,000 cartridges.

Men of the Dakota Militia are estimated to have killed between 12 and 18 Lakota in mid-December 1890, "kinsmen, brothers, or sons of the Lakota seeking refuge on Stronghold." The Dakota Militia's actions were a significant precipitating factor in the confrontation that culminated in the Wounded Knee massacre.

By January 1891, following Wounded Knee, the militia under Day had expanded to some 200 men who "patrolled Cheyenne River as a screen for the Black Hills settlements."

Day resigned his position as colonel of the militia in a telegram to Gov. Mellette on July 8, 1891.

In 1940, U.S. Senator Francis H. Case of South Dakota sought military pensions for the Spring Creek Company of volunteers led by Day. It seems the War Department's position was that the company were not formally mustered, had never drawn pay, and Day was never commissioned as a colonel. Case presented communications to Day from U.S. Army Major General Nelson A. Miles, Colonel Eugene Asa Carr, Lieutenant Colonel R.H. Offley and Major Harry C. Egbert, all addressing him as colonel. It appears the Governor did not have legally invested authority to raise any units of the state militia but that Day's unit was raised under other emergency powers, which meant he had no authority to pay them. They received arms and ammunition from the regular army but were not under any formal standing with them. General Frank T. Hines of the U.S. Department of Veterans Affairs stated at the time of the hearing that he accepted the company had existed and cooperated with the army but that current legislation meant he could not pay pensions to the men as they drew no pay from the federal government or state, though he felt they were morally entitled to a pension.

=== Later years ===
In 1891, Mr. Day brought suit against a "notorious confidence swindler" Ellen E. Peck, who had fraudulently cheated him of property in Brooklyn, New York valued at $250,000.

Also in 1891, he was believed to be an investor in South Dakota tin mines and possibly the "tin reduction works" at Hill City, South Dakota. He was also involved in mining near Quincy, California. In 1894, when he was President of the Plumas Imperial Gold Mining Company, he bought a half-interest in the North Fork "quartz development" including mines called Del Norte, Bear, Cub, and Star.

In 1893 he seems to have ghosted investigators inquiring about a "horse company" he ran; he was suspected of embezzling $20,000.

A business partner successfully executed an arrest warrant when he was visiting Boston, Massachusetts, in 1896. It was alleged that he had fraudulently engaged in business transactions through his ranching operations in South Dakota. He was arrested in Boston on fraud charges laid by business partners, Joseph Megru and Joseph Rhodes, and subsequently released on a $20,000 bond. The arrest was covered in Los Angeles newspapers, "The arrest of Colonel Merritt H. Day, a well-known mining man and promoter of western enterprises, was the subject of much discussion in the various hotels yesterday, he being well known in this city. He was arrested in Boston and had a preliminary hearing on a charge of obtaining by fraud $14,000 from two well-known capitalists of Cincinnati. He has always been regarded as a man of high responsibility and standing and his friends are disposed to believe his claim that it is a case of blackmail. He was able to find all the bail he needed, though there are some rather suspicious features in the case, which need explanation." He was acquitted of any malfeasance and publicly disclosed how an investment in 1,000 Kentucky horses he was raising on his Rapid Creek Horse Ranch in Dakota had sunk to 10 percent and the partners went sour—as Day recounted: "This arrest came to me like a bolt out of a clear sky. I immediately surmised that they [his business partners] thought it was a good time to squeeze me, and force me to pay them money. The whole thing is ridiculous."

He seems to have moved to California in about 1894 but would return periodically to South Dakota to attend to business interests including some kind of a chlorination plant, and a copper-mining business near Custer City, Pennington County, which he operated jointly with his son. In 1897 he sold his home in Rapid City to Chauncey L. Wood; "the house is one of the finest in the city".

His death was reported in several S.D. newspapers: "Early residents of South Dakota will learn with regret of the death of Col. M. H. Day, at Rapid City, S. D., May 4, of appendicitis. Col. Day was a prominent democrat in territorial days, living at Springfield east of the river and was colonel on Gov. Mellette's staff at the time of the Wounded Knee Indian uprising and had command of the state troops in that affair."

== Personal ==
Day was born in Markesan, Wisconsin (which was at that time in Marquette County, and is now Green Lake County, Wisconsin) on August 27, 1844. In 1860 at age 16 he was living with his parents John Day, a gunsmith, and his wife Maria (Drutcher), in Baraboo, Sauk County, Wisconsin. His birthplace was listed as Ohio.

Following the Civil War, he relocated to Humboldt County, Iowa, where he married Elizabeth Mary Southwick, a native of Massachusetts, in 1867. In 1872, the couple and their two-year-old daughter, Julia, settled in Brule County. The couple also had a son named Lee M. Day, born 1875. (Lee later participated in a different South Dakota militia called Grisby's Cowboys, which volunteered for the Spanish-American War. Grisby's Cowboys never deployed and spent the duration in Tennessee.)

Day's wife Mary E. Day seems to have died in 1892 and is buried in Bon Homme County.

One record says Merritt H. Day died May 4, 1900, of appendicitis and a widow or other survivor applied for an American Civil War pension in 1903. The New York Times listed his cause of death as appendicitis, date of death as May 4, and place of death as Deadwood, South Dakota. The cemetery record says he died May 3, 1900, in Rapid City, South Dakota of inflammation of the bowels. He was survived by "a widow, two daughters, and one son".

Day was buried in Mountain View Cemetery, Oakland, California, on May 10, 1900.
