= International Vinegar Museum =

- Roslyn Auditorium
- U.S. National Register of Historic Places
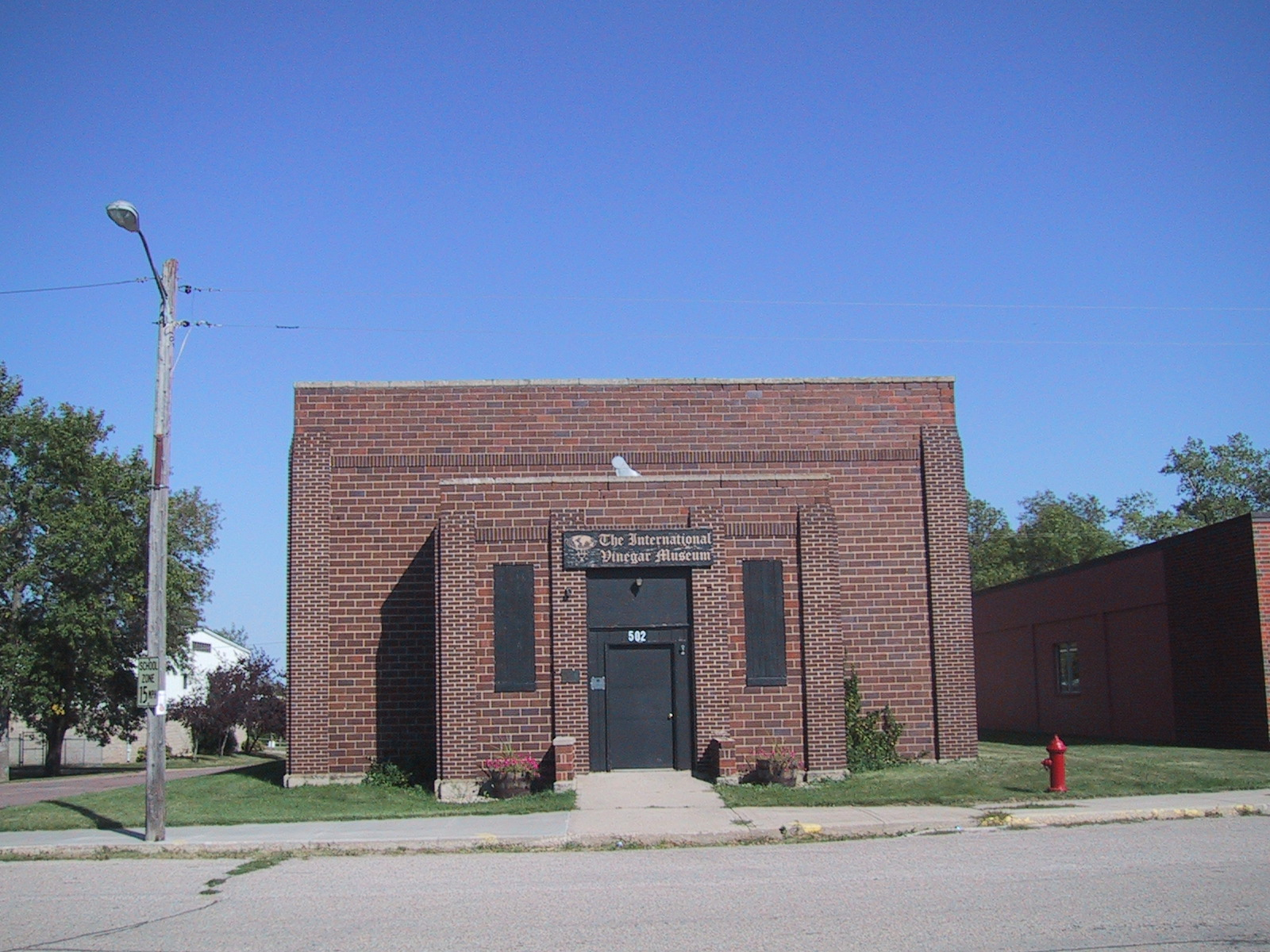

- Location within South Dakota Location within the United States
- Location: 510 Main, Roslyn, South Dakota
- Coordinates: 45°29′48″N 97°29′29″W
- Area: less than one acre
- Built: 1936
- Built by: Works Progress Administration
- Architectural style: WPA era
- Website: Official website
- MPS: Federal Relief Construction in South Dakota MPS
- NRHP reference No.: 01000097
- Added to NRHP: February 9, 2001

The International Vinegar Museum is located at 500 Main Street in Roslyn, South Dakota, United States. The museum is located in the former Roslyn Auditorium, a Depression-era brick building built in 1936 with funding from the Works Progress Administration. The building was listed on the National Register of Historic Places in 2001. The museum opened in 1999 and bills itself as the first museum dedicated to the subject of vinegar, with exhibits in its manufacture and use.

== Museum ==
In the 1990s, the community began searching for something to draw visitors in. Concerned citizens formed the Community Advancement for Roslyn and Eden. They decided the feature needed to be something unique from anything else in the area. Lawrence Diggs, a resident who had lived in the town since 1989, had extensive knowledge of vinegar and a small collection from his time researching the substance at San Francisco State University. The decision was then made to turn this collection into a museum.

The International Vinegar Museum opened on June 4, 1999. Over 350 different types of vinegar from around the world are on display and include a range of different flavors, such as pecan, tequila lime, maple, and blueberry. Exhibits include information about the history and applications of vinegar. There is also a small gift shop that sells vinegar-themed merchandise and the museum's own line of vinegars, including flavored varieties and a balsamic imported from Italy. Roslyn also hosts an annual Vinegar Festival in late June, which elects an honorary "royal quart" and a "vinegar queen". The museum is open only from Thursday to Saturday each summer, defined as early June to Labor Day.

== History ==
Built in 1936 by the Works Progress Administration (WPA), the Roslyn Auditorium became a center of social life in a developing small, rural community. Roslyn is a small settlement in rural northeast South Dakota, founded in the path of the Soo Line Railroad, and its main industry is agriculture. Until the Great Depression, federal funds could not be obtained for local community projects; when this program was introduced, communities across South Dakota flocked to receive federal aid for these developments. Roslyn had suffered due to the depression as well as the Dust Bowl. Their main community hub, the Roslyn Opera House, had been destroyed in a fire in 1923 and left Roslyn with no permanent social center. The auditorium was constructed to fulfill that purpose. It has acted as a multipurpose building across the decades and has seen use as a gymnasium, performance hall, social club, and a senior citizens' center before becoming the International Vinegar Museum. Local clubs such as the Sons and Daughters of Norway and the Modern Woodmen of America have held their meetings there. Roslyn High School used the building as its gym and auditorium from the 1960s through the 1980s. The building was listed on the National Register of Historic Places on February 9, 2001, deemed significant for its local notability and as a product of the WPA.

== Architecture ==
The building is a one-story rectangular red-brick building with hardwood floors and sits on the corner of Main Street and Bjornsoa Avenue. Its simple, utilitarian vernacular style is reflective of the WPA's typical architectural style. Its main entrance opens to the west, onto Main Street, and projects out from the rest of the front façade. Long, vertical windows sit on either side of the front door. Six pilasters line the building: one at each corner and two bordering the front entrance projection. A decorative dark-red brick frieze runs around the building, just under its parapet. Several of its windows have been boarded up. An addition to the rear wall was built in 1987. It is a simple wooden structure with a gable roof, providing back access to the building. The interior has been largely unchanged since its construction; a drop ceiling was added to improve lighting for the museum.

== See also ==
- Zhenjiang Vinegar Culture Museum
- List of museums in South Dakota
- National Register of Historic Places listings in Day County, South Dakota
