= Judy Karpen =

American astrophysicist

Judith Tobi Karpen (born 1953) is an American astrophysicist who works for NASA as chief of the Space Weather Laboratory at the Goddard Space Flight Center. She is known for her research on solar prominences and the solar wind, including the use of the Solar Dynamics Observatory to observe the fine structure of plumes in the solar corona.

== Education and career ==
Karpen is a 1973 graduate of the University of Michigan, majoring in physics. She completed a Ph.D. in astronomy in 1980 at the University of Maryland, College Park

After postdoctoral research at the Naval Research Laboratory, Karpen became a researcher in the Solar-Terrestrial Relationships Branch of the Naval Research Laboratory in 1984. She joined the Space Weather Laboratory of the Goddard Space Flight Center in 2008, and became chief of the laboratory in 2012.

== Recognition ==
The American Astronomical Society (AAS) named Karpen to the 2022 class of AAS Fellows, "for her sustained contributions to understanding the formation and dynamics of the solar corona and wind".
