= Day County, South Dakota =

County in South Dakota, United States

- County
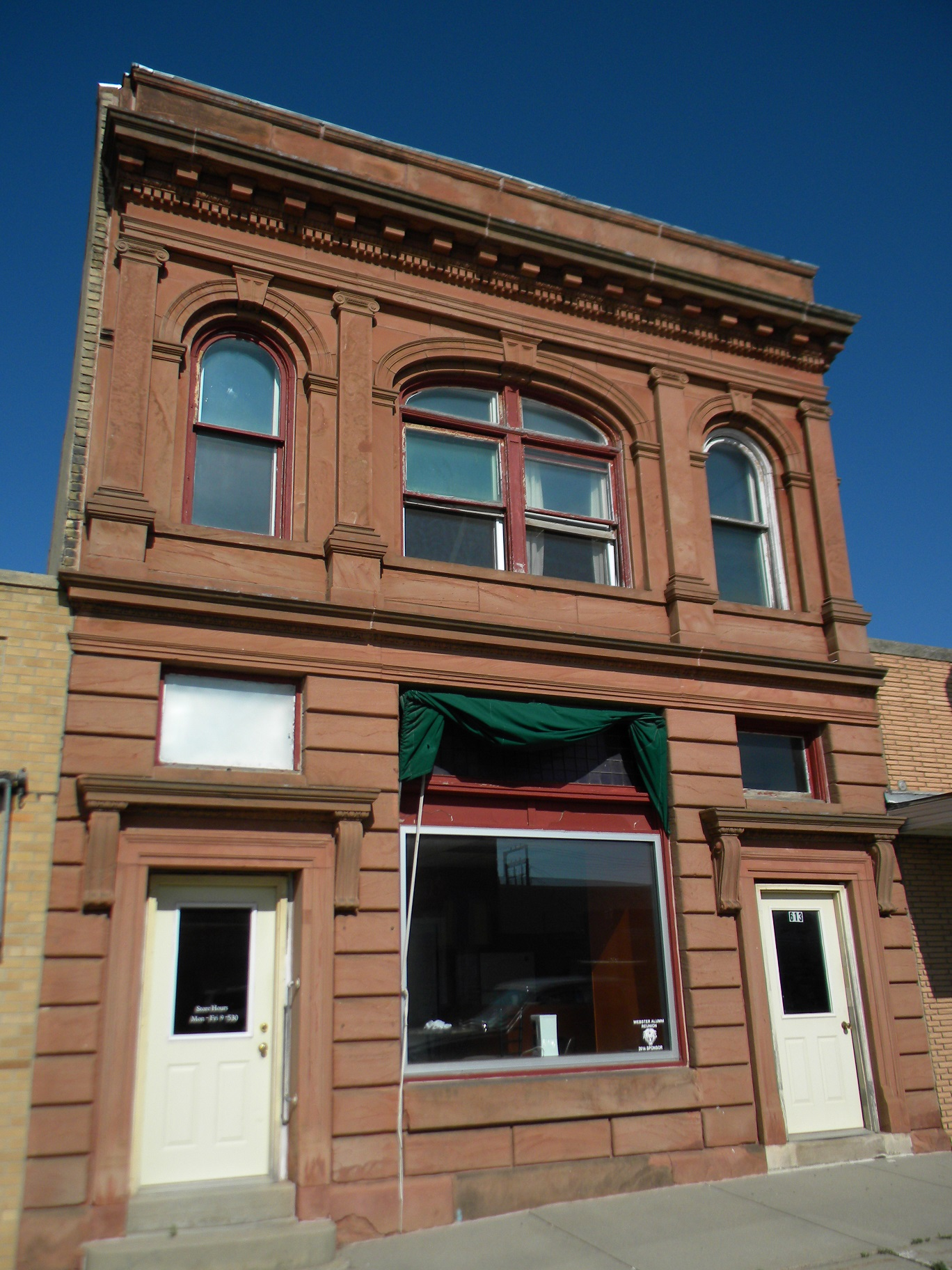
- First National Bank (Webster, South Dakota)

- Location within the U.S. state of South Dakota
- Coordinates: 45°22′N 97°37′W
- Country: United States
- State: South Dakota
- Founded: 1880
- Named for: Merritt H. Day
- Seat: Webster
- Largest city: Webster

Area
  - Total: 1,091 sq mi (2,830 km^{2})
  - Land: 1,028 sq mi (2,660 km^{2})
  - Water: 63 sq mi (160 km^{2}) 5.8%

Population (2020)
  - Total: 5,449
  - Estimate (2025): 5,484 ▲
  - Density: 5.301/sq mi (2.047/km^{2})
- Time zone: UTC−6 (Central)
  - Summer (DST): UTC−5 (CDT)
- Congressional district: At-large
- Website: day.sdcounties.org

Day County is a county in the U.S. state of South Dakota. As of the 2020 census, the population was 5,449. Its county seat is Webster. The county is named for Merritt H. Day, pioneer and 1879 Dakota Territory legislator.

== Geography ==
Native Vegetation based on NRCS soils information

The terrain of Day County consists of rolling hills, partly devoted to agriculture. It is dotted with numerous lakes and ponds, especially its eastern portion. The terrain slopes to the west; its highest point is the northeast corner, at 2,014 ft (614 m) ASL. The county has a total area of 1,091 square miles (2,830 km^{2}), of which 1,028 square miles (2,660 km^{2}) is land and 63 square miles (160 km^{2}) (5.8%) is water.

=== Lakes ===
- Amsden
- Antelope
- Bitter
- Blue Dog
- Enemy Swim
- Horseshoe
- Lynn
- Minnewaste
- Pickerel Lake
- Reetz
- Rush
- Sweetwater
- Waubay

=== Major highways ===
- U.S. Highway 12
- South Dakota Highway 25
- South Dakota Highway 27

=== Adjacent counties ===
- Marshall County – north
- Roberts County – east
- Grant County – southeast
- Codington County – southeast
- Clark County – south
- Spink County – southwest
- Brown County – west

=== Protected areas ===
- Buchner Slough State Public Shooting Area
- Holmquist Slough State Public Shooting Area
- Lily State Public Shooting Area
- Myland Pass State Public Shooting Area
- Nelson Slough State Public Shooting Area
- Pickerel Lake State Recreation Area
- Pierpont Lake Recreation Area
- Waubay National Wildlife Refuge

== Demographics ==
Historical population
Census	Pop.	Note	%±
1880	97		—
1890	9,168		9,351.5%
1900	12,254		33.7%
1910	14,372		17.3%
1920	15,194		5.7%
1930	14,606		−3.9%
1940	13,565		−7.1%
1950	12,294		−9.4%
1960	10,516		−14.5%
1970	8,713		−17.1%
1980	8,133		−6.7%
1990	6,978		−14.2%
2000	6,267		−10.2%
2010	5,710		−8.9%
2020	5,449		−4.6%
2025 (est.)	5,484	▲	0.6%
U.S. Decennial Census; 1790–1960 1900–1990; 1990–2000 2010–2020

=== 2020 census ===
As of the 2020 census, there were 5,449 people, 2,370 households, and 1,451 families residing in the county. The population density was 5.3 inhabitants per square mile (2.0/km^{2}).

Of the residents, 23.1% were under the age of 18 and 26.3% were 65 years of age or older; the median age was 47.2 years. For every 100 females there were 103.9 males, and for every 100 females age 18 and over there were 102.7 males.

There were 2,370 households in the county, of which 24.6% had children under the age of 18 living with them and 22.3% had a female householder with no spouse or partner present. About 34.0% of all households were made up of individuals and 17.3% had someone living alone who was 65 years of age or older.

There were 3,395 housing units, of which 30.2% were vacant. Among occupied housing units, 77.8% were owner-occupied and 22.2% were renter-occupied. The homeowner vacancy rate was 1.5% and the rental vacancy rate was 13.1%.

The racial makeup of the county was 84.9% White, 0.1% Black or African American, 9.9% American Indian and Alaska Native, 0.4% Asian, 0.3% from some other race, and 4.3% from two or more races. Hispanic or Latino residents of any race comprised 2.8% of the population.

The median income for a household in the county was $57,558 and the median income for a family was $76,583. About 13.1% of families and 14.7% of the population were below the poverty line, including 21.5% of those under age 18 and 11.9% of those age 65 or over.

=== 2010 census ===
As of the 2010 census, there were 5,710 people, 2,504 households, and 1,561 families in the county. The population density was 5.6 inhabitants per square mile (2.2/km^{2}). There were 3,630 housing units at an average density of 3.5 units per square mile (1.4 units/km^{2}). The racial makeup of the county was 88.1% white, 9.5% American Indian, 0.2% Asian, 0.1% black or African American, 0.4% from other races, and 1.7% from two or more races. Those of Hispanic or Latino origin made up 1.1% of the population. In terms of ancestry, 43.8% were German, 25.1% were Norwegian, 12.8% were Polish, 8.8% were Irish, and 6.1% were American.

Of the 2,504 households, 24.4% had children under the age of 18 living with them, 50.0% were married couples living together, 7.9% had a female householder with no husband present, 37.7% were non-families, and 34.0% of all households were made up of individuals. The average household size was 2.22 and the average family size was 2.83. The median age was 47.9 years.

The median income for a household in the county was $36,818 and the median income for a family was $47,949. Males had a median income of $36,549 versus $25,750 for females. The per capita income for the county was $20,542. About 10.7% of families and 12.5% of the population were below the poverty line, including 11.7% of those under age 18 and 14.1% of those age 65 or over.

== Communities ==
=== Cities ===
- Bristol
- Waubay
- Webster (county seat)

=== Towns ===
- Andover
- Butler
- Grenville
- Pierpont
- Roslyn

=== Census-designated place ===
- Enemy Swim

=== Unincorporated communities ===
- Amsden
- Crandall
- Holmquist
- Lily

=== Townships ===
- Andover
- Bristol
- Butler
- Central Point
- Egeland
- Farmington
- Grenville
- Highland
- Homer
- Independence
- Kidder
- Kosciusko
- Liberty
- Lynn
- Morton
- Nutley
- Oak Gulch
- Racine
- Raritan
- Rusk
- Scotland
- Troy
- Union
- Valley
- Waubay
- Webster
- Wheatland
- York

== Politics ==
Day County voters have tended to vote Democratic for the past several decades. Since 1948 the county has selected the Democratic Party candidate in 71% of national elections. However, the county swung hard to Donald Trump in 2016, and in 2020 Trump posted the best percentage in the county by a Republican presidential candidate since Theodore Roosevelt in 1904.

United States presidential election results for Day County, South Dakota
Year	Republican		Democratic		Third party(ies)	
Year	No.	%	No.	%	No.	%
1892	752	38.92%	362	18.74%	818	42.34%
1896	1,171	48.07%	1,230	50.49%	35	1.44%
1900	1,558	56.37%	1,092	39.51%	114	4.12%
1904	2,077	73.50%	383	13.55%	366	12.95%
1908	1,616	59.22%	813	29.79%	300	10.99%
1912	0	0.00%	787	33.76%	1,544	66.24%
1916	1,758	61.21%	907	31.58%	207	7.21%
1920	2,739	59.82%	436	9.52%	1,404	30.66%
1924	2,193	55.17%	308	7.75%	1,474	37.08%
1928	3,180	54.22%	2,642	45.05%	43	0.73%
1932	1,983	32.03%	3,910	63.16%	298	4.81%
1936	2,113	36.88%	3,335	58.21%	281	4.90%
1940	3,277	49.85%	3,297	50.15%	0	0.00%
1944	2,593	51.04%	2,487	48.96%	0	0.00%
1948	2,438	42.91%	3,146	55.38%	97	1.71%
1952	3,648	60.81%	2,351	39.19%	0	0.00%
1956	2,652	47.16%	2,971	52.84%	0	0.00%
1960	2,626	48.09%	2,835	51.91%	0	0.00%
1964	1,914	37.17%	3,235	62.83%	0	0.00%
1968	2,062	43.81%	2,463	52.33%	182	3.87%
1972	1,971	41.95%	2,719	57.86%	9	0.19%
1976	1,617	37.98%	2,610	61.31%	30	0.70%
1980	2,507	55.18%	1,720	37.86%	316	6.96%
1984	2,150	52.43%	1,932	47.11%	19	0.46%
1988	1,616	42.82%	2,137	56.62%	21	0.56%
1992	1,161	31.17%	1,578	42.36%	986	26.47%
1996	1,282	36.29%	1,840	52.08%	411	11.63%
2000	1,623	50.77%	1,492	46.67%	82	2.56%
2004	1,671	47.20%	1,817	51.33%	52	1.47%
2008	1,372	42.81%	1,785	55.69%	48	1.50%
2012	1,320	45.95%	1,497	52.11%	56	1.95%
2016	1,627	59.23%	974	35.46%	146	5.31%
2020	1,869	63.06%	1,052	35.49%	43	1.45%
2024	1,876	63.98%	1,000	34.11%	56	1.91%

== See also ==
- National Register of Historic Places listings in Day County, South Dakota
- Historic Mapworks: Day County 1929 Township Maps
