= Roslyn, South Dakota =

Roslyn, South Dakota Eya Šiča (Dakota)
- Town
- Location in Day County and the state of South Dakota
- Coordinates: 45°29′48″N 97°29′33″W
- Country: United States
- State: South Dakota
- County: Day
- Incorporated: 1914

Area
  - Total: 0.22 sq mi (0.56 km^{2})
  - Land: 0.22 sq mi (0.56 km^{2})
  - Water: 0 sq mi (0.00 km^{2})
- Elevation: 1,867 ft (569 m)

Population (2020)
  - Total: 181
  - Density: 829.9/sq mi (320.42/km^{2})
- Time zone: UTC-6 (Central (CST))
  - Summer (DST): UTC-5 (CDT)
- ZIP code: 57261
- Area code: 605
- FIPS code: 46-56380
- GNIS feature ID: 1267556
- Website: roslynsd.com

Roslyn (Dakota: Eya Šiča) is a town in northern Day County, South Dakota, United States. The population was 181 at the 2020 census.

== Geography ==
According to the United States Census Bureau, the town has a total area of 0.20 square miles (0.52 km^{2}), all land.

== History ==
“Roslyn received its name from Old Roslyn, which was a post office and trading point established in 1882. H.H. Russell, the first postmaster, took the name Roslyn from his native city in Scotland.” Another source states the name Roslyn is an amalgamation of Rosholt and Lynn, the names of two lakes near the town site.

“In 1914, the Soo Line Railroad (Fairmount and Veblen Railway) was being built in the area. In order to secure the line for the community, settlers adjoining the proposed line raised $60,000. The coming of the railroad led to the selection of a new town site. On August 17, 1914, the New Roslyn was plotted and Main Street was established.” Old Roslyn was eventually abandoned.

== Demographics ==
Historical population
Census	Pop.	Note	%±
1920	211		—
1930	237		12.3%
1940	253		6.8%
1950	222		−12.3%
1960	256		15.3%
1970	250		−2.3%
1980	261		4.4%
1990	251		−3.8%
2000	225		−10.4%
2010	183		−18.7%
2020	181		−1.1%
U.S. Decennial Census

=== 2010 census ===
As of the census of 2010, there were 183 people, 77 households, and 42 families residing in the town. The population density was 915.0 inhabitants per square mile (353.3/km^{2}). There were 105 housing units at an average density of 525.0 per square mile (202.7/km^{2}). The racial makeup of the town was 97.8% White, 1.1% Native American, and 1.1% from two or more races.

There were 77 households, of which 15.6% had children under the age of 18 living with them, 44.2% were married couples living together, 6.5% had a female householder with no husband present, 3.9% had a male householder with no wife present, and 45.5% were non-families. 42.9% of all households were made up of individuals, and 26% had someone living alone who was 65 years of age or older. The average household size was 1.99 and the average family size was 2.71.

The median age in the town was 59.8 years. 16.9% of residents were under the age of 18; 4.9% were between the ages of 18 and 24; 13.6% were from 25 to 44; 23% were from 45 to 64; and 41.5% were 65 years of age or older. The gender makeup of the town was 47.0% male and 53.0% female.

=== 2000 census ===
As of the census of 2000, there were 225 people, 93 households, and 50 families residing in the town. The population density was 1,128.5 inhabitants per square mile (435.7/km^{2}). There were 109 housing units at an average density of 546.7 per square mile (211.1/km^{2}). The racial makeup of the town was 97.78% White, 1.78% African American and 0.44% Native American.

There were 93 households, out of which 26.9% had children under the age of 18 living with them, 43.0% were married couples living together, 9.7% had a female householder with no husband present, and 46.2% were non-families. 40.9% of all households were made up of individuals, and 29.0% had someone living alone who was 65 years of age or older. The average household size was 2.05 and the average family size was 2.82.

In the town, the population was spread out, with 19.1% under the age of 18, 6.7% from 18 to 24, 14.7% from 25 to 44, 20.0% from 45 to 64, and 39.6% who were 65 years of age or older. The median age was 51 years. For every 100 females, there were 77.2 males. For every 100 females age 18 and over, there were 75.0 males.

The median income for a household in the town was $19,375, and the median income for a family was $24,375. Males had a median income of $30,625 versus $18,438 for females. The per capita income for the town was $11,527. About 14.0% of families and 18.4% of the population were below the poverty line, including 26.5% of those under the age of eighteen and 18.3% of those 65 or over.

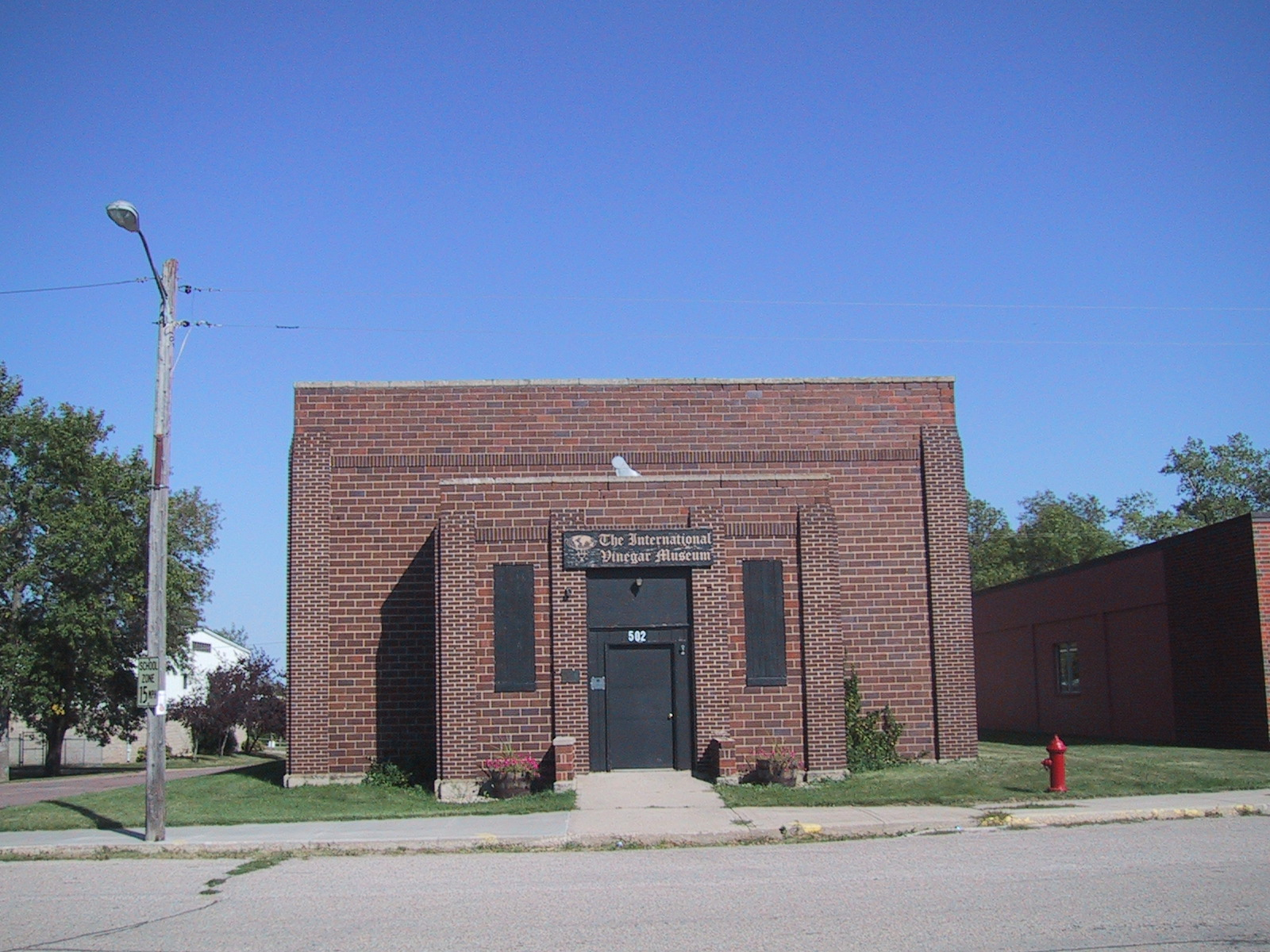
The International Vinegar Museum, August 2008

== Attractions ==
Since 1999, Roslyn has been home to the International Vinegar Museum. Each year it hosts the International Vinegar Festival.

== Notable people ==
- Myron Floren - Accordionist on The Lawrence Welk Show
- Henry A. Lardy - biochemist

== See also ==
- List of towns in South Dakota
