= Andover, South Dakota =

Andover
- Town
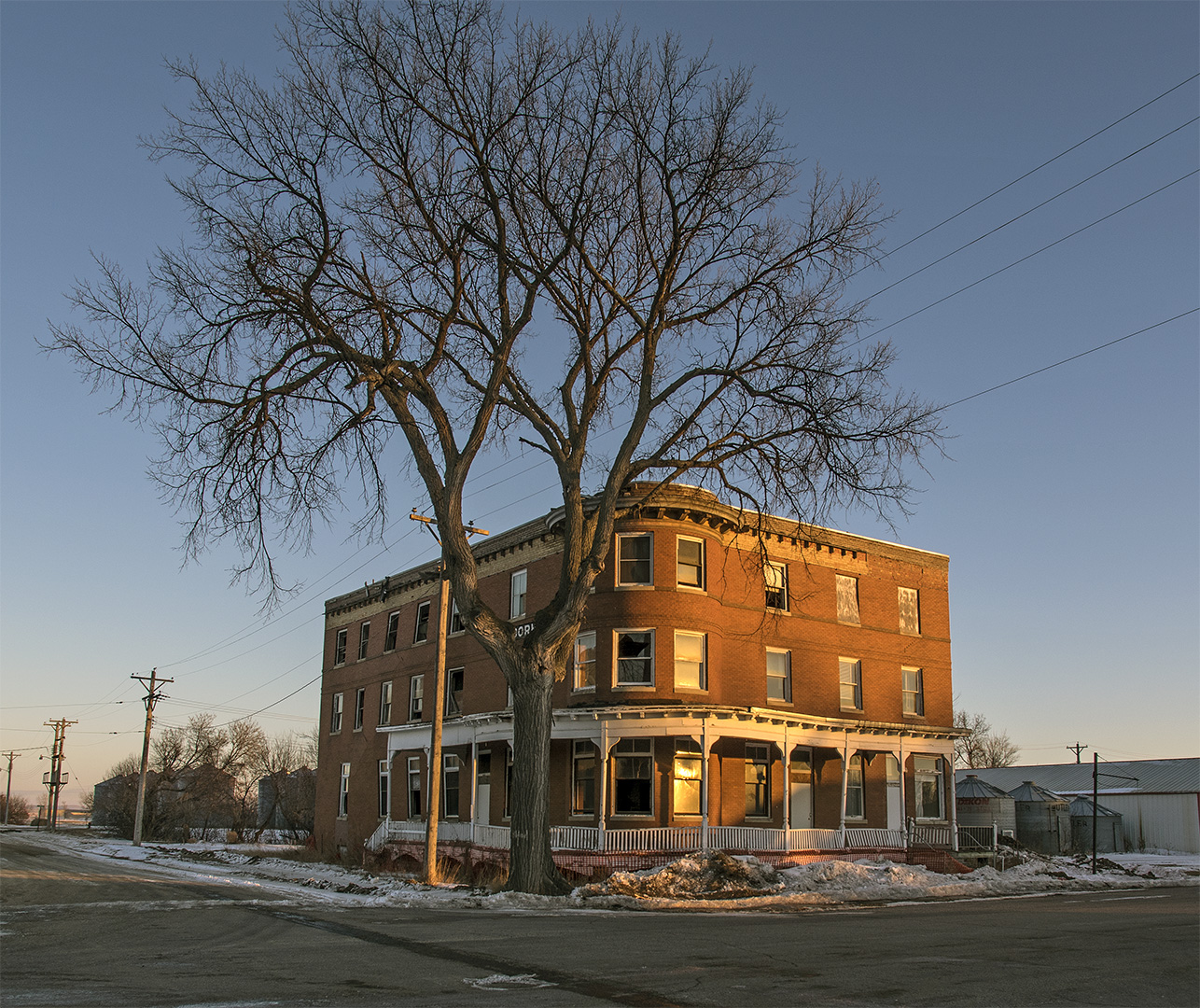
- The Waldorf Hotel in Andover in 2014

- Location in Day County and the state of South Dakota

- Location in South Dakota Andover (the United States) Andover (North America)
- Coordinates: 45°24′37″N 97°54′13″W
- Country: United States
- State: South Dakota
- County: Day
- Incorporated: 1881

Area
  - Total: 0.27 sq mi (0.70 km^{2})
  - Land: 0.27 sq mi (0.70 km^{2})
  - Water: 0 sq mi (0.00 km^{2})
- Elevation: 1,483 ft (452 m)

Population (2020)
  - Total: 66
  - Density: 244.2/sq mi (94.27/km^{2})
- Time zone: UTC-6 (Central (CST))
  - Summer (DST): UTC-5 (CDT)
- ZIP code: 57422
- Area code: 605
- FIPS code: 46-01500
- GNIS feature ID: 1267266

Andover is a town in northwestern Day County, South Dakota, United States. The population was 66 at the 2020 census.

== History ==
A post office called Andover was established in 1881. The town most likely takes its name from Andover, Massachusetts.

== Geography ==
According to the United States Census Bureau, the town has a total area of 0.27 square miles (0.70 km^{2}), all land.

== Demographics ==
Historical population
Census	Pop.	Note	%±
1890	232		—
1900	225		−3.0%
1910	446		98.2%
1920	441		−1.1%
1930	322		−27.0%
1940	350		8.7%
1950	277		−20.9%
1960	224		−19.1%
1970	138		−38.4%
1980	139		0.7%
1990	106		−23.7%
2000	99		−6.6%
2010	91		−8.1%
2020	66		−27.5%
U.S. Decennial Census

=== 2020 Census ===
As of the census of 2020, there were 66 people, 35 households and 11 families residing in the town. The racial makeup of the town was 86.4% White and Hispanic or Latino of any race were 6% of the population.

=== 2010 census ===
As of the census of 2010, there were 91 people, 42 households, and 24 families residing in the town. The population density was 337.0 inhabitants per square mile (130.1/km^{2}). There were 60 housing units at an average density of 222.2 per square mile (85.8/km^{2}). The racial makeup of the town was 95.6% White and 4.4% from other races. Hispanic or Latino of any race were 16.5% of the population.

There were 42 households, of which 23.8% had children under the age of 18 living with them, 50.0% were married couples living together, 4.8% had a female householder with no husband present, 2.4% had a male householder with no wife present, and 42.9% were non-families. 40.5% of all households were made up of individuals, and 26.2% had someone living alone who was 65 years of age or older. The average household size was 2.17 and the average family size was 2.79.

The median age in the town was 50.8 years. 16.5% of residents were under the age of 18; 5.5% were between the ages of 18 and 24; 19.8% were from 25 to 44; 37.4% were from 45 to 64; and 20.9% were 65 years of age or older. The gender makeup of the town was 54.9% male and 45.1% female.

=== 2000 census ===
As of the census of 2000, there were 99 people, 46 households, and 23 families residing in the town. The population density was 361.6 inhabitants per square mile (139.6/km^{2}). There were 62 housing units at an average density of 226.4 per square mile (87.4/km^{2}). The racial makeup of the town was 100.00% White.

There were 46 households, out of which 19.6% had children under the age of 18 living with them, 45.7% were married couples living together, 2.2% had a female householder with no husband present, and 50.0% were non-families. 50.0% of all households were made up of individuals, and 30.4% had someone living alone who was 65 years of age or older. The average household size was 2.15 and the average family size was 3.26.

In the town, the population was spread out, with 25.3% under the age of 18, 2.0% from 18 to 24, 20.2% from 25 to 44, 18.2% from 45 to 64, and 34.3% who were 65 years of age or older. The median age was 46 years. For every 100 females, there were 110.6 males. For every 100 females age 18 and over, there were 111.4 males.

The median income for a household in the town was $20,625, and the median income for a family was $41,250. Males had a median income of $38,125 versus $18,750 for females. The per capita income for the town was $15,744. There were 11.1% of families and 18.5% of the population living below the poverty line, including no under eighteens and 17.6% of those over 64.

== See also ==
- List of towns in South Dakota
