= Karpen House =

Historic house in New York, United States

- U.S. National Register of Historic Places
- Location within New York Location within the United States
- Location: 3 Harbor Hill Dr., Lloyd Harbor, New York
- Coordinates: 40°53′46″N 73°27′17″W
- Area: 2 acres (0.81 ha)
- Built: 1955
- Architect: Hibner, Keith; Karpen, Morris
- Architectural style: Modern Movement
- NRHP reference No.: 06000643
- Added to NRHP: July 26, 2006

Karpen House is a historic home located at Lloyd Harbor in Suffolk County, New York. It was built in 1955 and is a long, low residence surmounted by a flat roof with overhanging eaves. It represents a vernacular interpretation of the Modern style.

It was added to the National Register of Historic Places in 2006.
