= Anton and Mary Agnes Karpen House =

Historic house in South Dakota, United States

- U.S. National Register of Historic Places
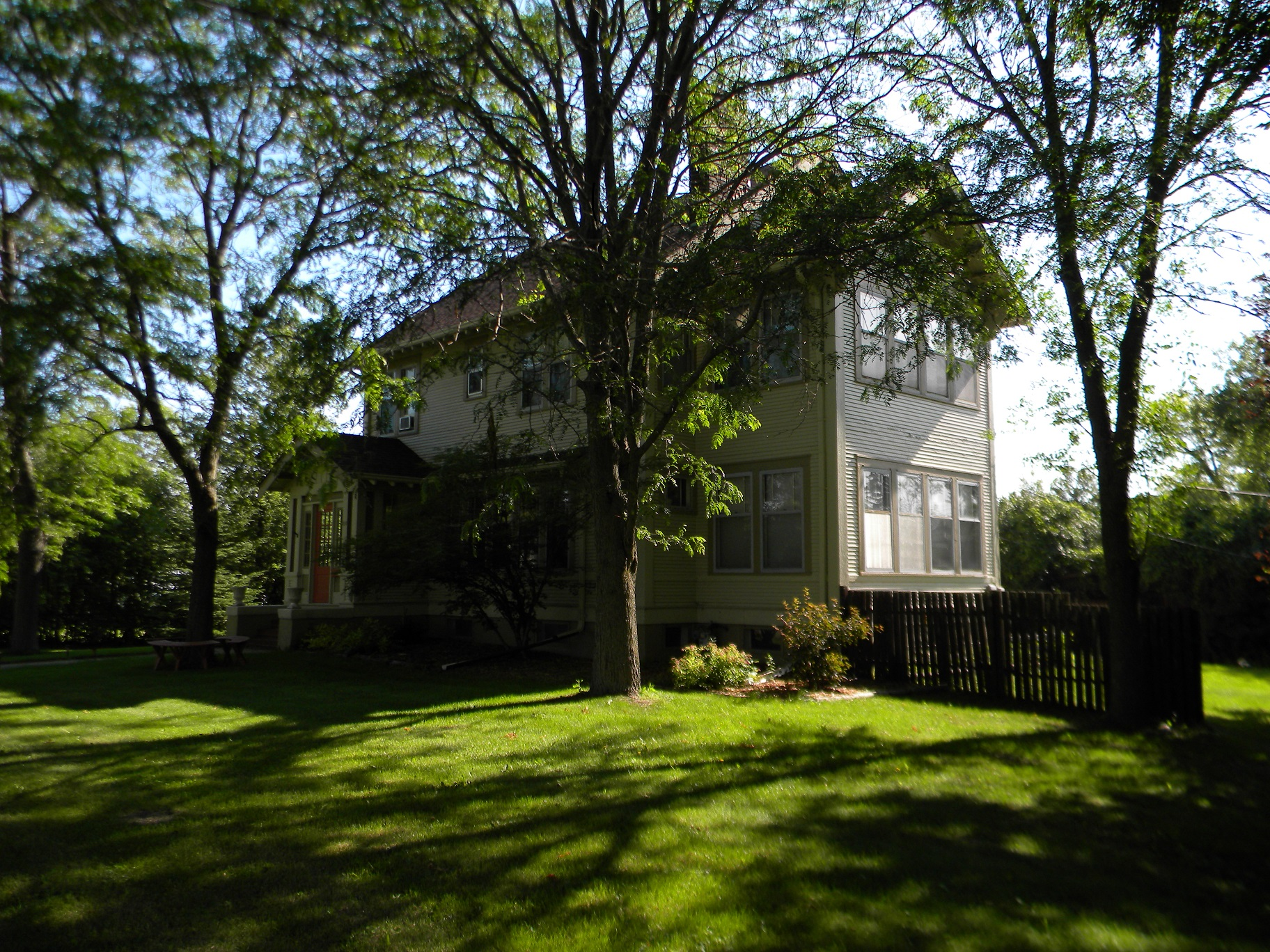

- Location within South Dakota Location within the United States
- Location: 818 1st St. W., Webster, South Dakota
- Coordinates: 45°20′9″N 97°31′16″W
- Area: less than one acre
- Built: 1917
- Architectural style: Bungalow/craftsman
- NRHP reference No.: 08000042
- Added to NRHP: February 19, 2008

The Anton and Mary Agnes Karpen House is a historic house at 818 1st Street West in Webster, South Dakota. It is a two-story wood frame house, built in 1917 for Anton Karpen, the owner of a local lumberyard. The house is an excellent local example of Craftsman styling, with extended eaves showing exposed rafters, bands of windows, the use of colored glass, and a built-in fieldstone fireplace. The house was later owned by Lewis Bicknell, a prominent local attorney.

The house was listed on the National Register of Historic Places in 2008.
