= Waldorf Hotel (Andover, South Dakota) =

- U.S. National Register of Historic Places
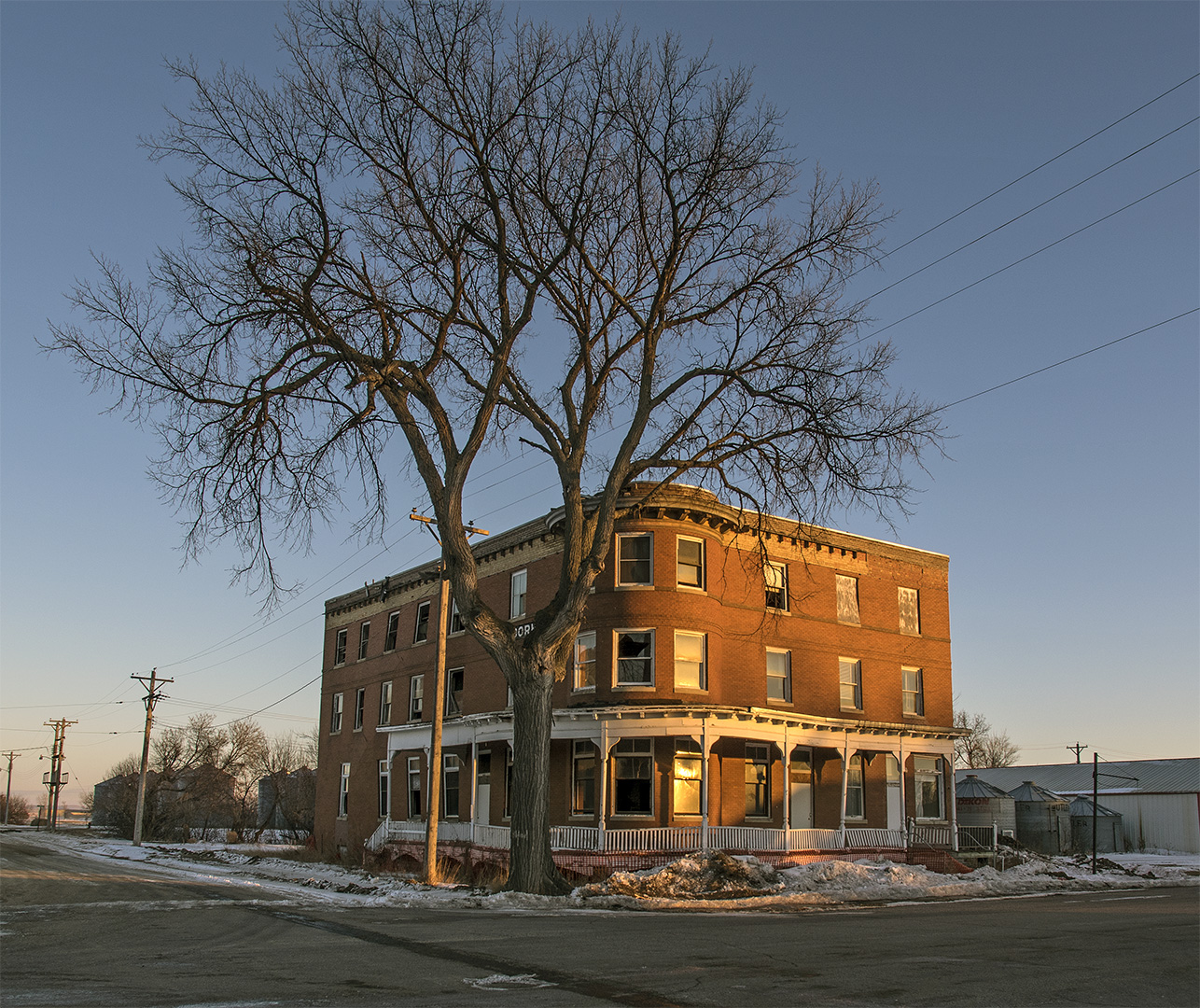

- Location within South Dakota Location within the United States
- Location: Main St., Andover, South Dakota
- Coordinates: 45°24′43″N 97°54′13″W
- Area: less than one acre
- Built: 1903
- Architectural style: Late Victorian
- NRHP reference No.: 79002401
- Added to NRHP: September 13, 1979

The Waldorf Hotel was a historic hotel building on Main Street in Andover, South Dakota. It was a three-story orange brick building with a rounded projecting section at the street corner. A single-story porch with turned posts and bracket extended along two sides of the building. The hotel was built in 1903, primarily to serve passengers switching from one railroad line to another. It featured a barber shop, a billiard hall and a huge dining room and reception room. It also acted as a social center in the community, hosting ice cream socials and dances.

The Waldorf Hotel closed in the 1970s.

The hotel was listed on the National Register of Historic Places in 1979 and was torn down on May 7, 2015, after parts of the wall collapsed.
