= Lily, South Dakota =

Town in South Dakota, United States

- Town
- Location in Day County and the state of South Dakota
- Coordinates: 45°10′54″N 97°41′01″W
- Country: United States
- State: South Dakota
- County: Day

Area
  - Total: 0.30 sq mi (0.78 km^{2})
  - Land: 0.30 sq mi (0.78 km^{2})
  - Water: 0 sq mi (0 km^{2})
- Elevation: 1,857 ft (566 m)

Population (2010)
  - Total: 4
  - Estimate (2013): 4
  - Density: 13/sq mi (5.1/km^{2})
- Time zone: UTC-6 (Central (CST))
  - Summer (DST): UTC-5 (CDT)
- ZIP code: 57274
- Area code: 605
- FIPS code: 46-37140
- GNIS feature ID: 1267463

Lily is a former town in Day County, South Dakota, United States. The population was 4 at the 2010 census. The town was dissolved in March 2017 by the Day County court due to the population reaching zero.

== History ==
Lily was a depot served by the Chicago, Milwaukee, St. Paul and Pacific Railroad from 1898 until 1979. The town was named by its first postmaster, Ross Parks, after his sister, Lily. Mr. Parks and his sister homesteaded here in 1883. The post office is dated July 13, 1883.

== Notable people ==
In 1889 Vice President Hubert Humphrey’s maternal grandfather, Andrew Gutorm Sannes, settled his family in Lily. With his wife, Tomina Larson, and five children (including Kristine - b. 1883, Norway, mother of the future vice president), they moved here, where they had 6 more children. Andrew Sannes, an immigrant Norwegian sea captain (with the dashed dream of being a Mississippi River boat captain), opened a drugstore in the corner of the general store. Their third child, Sophia, was their first-borne in the U.S., in Lily (December 1891); and their last child born in Lily was Thorvald, on September 18, 1900.

Hubert Humphrey, Sr., after graduating from the Drew School of Pharmacy in Minneapolis, Minnesota, moved to Lily in 1903 and opened his first drugstore. (Today a small white sign cryptically marks the empty corner lot where the store had stood.) Here, he met Kristine Sannes, the woman who would become his wife. They married on April 16, 1906, in Lily.

In 1907 they moved to Wallace, South Dakota, where Hubert Humphrey, Jr., the notable politician, was born on May 27, 1911, in a bedroom over his father’s drugstore. Hubert Humphrey, Jr., states, "I was baptized in the Highland Lutheran church in a rural section just north of Lily, South Dakota."

In 2010, a video detailing the history of Lily was created by the McQuillen Creative Group. This video Memories of Lily - A Letter to Oprah submitted to Oprah Winfrey (who sponsored the contest to raise awareness of rural towns) depicts the essence of current day Lily.

== Geography ==
According to the United States Census Bureau, the town has a total area of 0.30 square miles (0.78 km^{2}), all land.

== Demographics ==
Historical population
Census	Pop.	Note	%±
1910	175		—
1920	187		6.9%
1930	135		−27.8%
1940	158		17.0%
1950	139		−12.0%
1960	119		−14.4%
1970	62		−47.9%
1980	38		−38.7%
1990	26		−31.6%
2000	21		−19.2%
2010	4		−81.0%
2019 (est.)	4		0.0%
U.S. Decennial Census; 2013 Estimate

=== 2010 census ===
As of the census of 2010, there were 4 people, 2 households, and 1 family residing in the town. The population density was 13.3 inhabitants per square mile (5.1/km^{2}). There were 13 housing units at an average density of 43.3 per square mile (16.7/km^{2}). The racial makeup of the town was 100.0% White.

There were 2 households, of which 50.0% were married couples living together and 50.0% were non-families. 50.0% of all households were made up of individuals, and 50% had someone living alone who was 65 years of age or older. The average household size was 2.00 and the average family size was 3.00.

The median age in the town was 55.5 years. 0.0% of residents were under the age of 18; 25% were between the ages of 18 and 24; 0.0% were from 25 to 44; 50% were from 45 to 64; and 25% were 65 years of age or older. The gender makeup of the town was 25.0% male and 75.0% female.

=== 2000 census ===
As of the census of 2000, there were 21 people, 10 households, and 5 families residing in the town. The population density was 69.2 inhabitants per square mile (26.7/km^{2}). There were 14 housing units at an average density of 46.1 per square mile (17.8/km^{2}). The racial makeup of the town was 100.00% White.

There were 10 households, out of which 30.0% had children under the age of 18 living with them, 40.0% were married couples living together, and 50.0% were non-families. 50.0% of all households were made up of individuals, and 40.0% had someone living alone who was 65 years of age or older. The average household size was 2.10 and the average family size was 3.00.

In the town, the population was spread out, with 28.6% under the age of 18, 4.8% from 18 to 24, 14.3% from 25 to 44, 9.5% from 45 to 64, and 42.9% who were 65 years of age or older. The median age was 54 years. For every 100 females, there were 75.0 males. For every 100 females age 18 and over, there were 114.3 males.

The median income for a household in the town was $16,250, and the median income for a family was $23,750. Males had a median income of $0 versus $0 for females. The per capita income for the town was $7,938. There were no families and 12.5% of the population living below the poverty line, including no under eighteens and none of those over 64.
