= Waubay, South Dakota =

Waubay, South Dakota Wašna (Dakota)
- City
- Location in Day County and the state of South Dakota
- Coordinates: 45°20′04″N 97°18′20″W
- Country: United States
- State: South Dakota
- County: Day
- Incorporated: 1895

Area
  - Total: 1.46 sq mi (3.77 km^{2})
  - Land: 1.46 sq mi (3.77 km^{2})
  - Water: 0 sq mi (0.00 km^{2})
- Elevation: 1,844 ft (562 m)

Population (2020)
  - Total: 473
  - Density: 324.9/sq mi (125.46/km^{2})
- Time zone: UTC-6 (Central (CST))
  - Summer (DST): UTC-5 (CDT)
- ZIP code: 57273
- Area code: 605
- FIPS code: 46-69340
- GNIS feature ID: 1267628
- Website: waubaysd.com

Waubay (Dakota: Wašna) is a city in Day County, South Dakota, United States. The population was 473 at the 2020 census.

Waubay had its start in the early 1880s when the railroad was extended to that point.

The school district is Waubay Public 18-3. The local newspaper is the oldest business in town, called the Waubay Clipper.

== Geography ==
According to the United States Census Bureau, the city has a total area of 1.46 square miles (3.78 km^{2}), all land.

== Demographics ==
Historical population
Census	Pop.	Note	%±
1900	430		—
1910	803		86.7%
1920	979		21.9%
1930	903		−7.8%
1940	882		−2.3%
1950	879		−0.3%
1960	851		−3.2%
1970	696		−18.2%
1980	675		−3.0%
1990	647		−4.1%
2000	662		2.3%
2010	576		−13.0%
2020	473		−17.9%
U.S. Decennial Census

=== 2020 census ===
As of the 2020 census, Waubay had a population of 473. The median age was 45.1 years. 25.2% of residents were under the age of 18 and 26.6% of residents were 65 years of age or older. For every 100 females there were 95.5 males, and for every 100 females age 18 and over there were 89.3 males age 18 and over.

0.0% of residents lived in urban areas, while 100.0% lived in rural areas.

There were 205 households in Waubay, of which 24.4% had children under the age of 18 living in them. Of all households, 37.1% were married-couple households, 23.4% were households with a male householder and no spouse or partner present, and 31.2% were households with a female householder and no spouse or partner present. About 39.5% of all households were made up of individuals and 20.0% had someone living alone who was 65 years of age or older.

There were 313 housing units, of which 34.5% were vacant. The homeowner vacancy rate was 3.0% and the rental vacancy rate was 9.1%.

Racial composition as of the 2020 census
Race	Number	Percent
White	282	59.6%
Black or African American	1	0.2%
American Indian and Alaska Native	139	29.4%
Asian	1	0.2%
Native Hawaiian and Other Pacific Islander	2	0.4%
Some other race	3	0.6%
Two or more races	45	9.5%
Hispanic or Latino (of any race)	11	2.3%

=== 2010 census ===
As of the census of 2010, there were 576 people, 242 households, and 148 families residing in the city. The population density was 394.5 inhabitants per square mile (152.3/km^{2}). There were 374 housing units at an average density of 256.2 per square mile (98.9/km^{2}). The racial makeup of the city was 59.9% White, 36.5% Native American, 0.3% Asian, and 3.3% from two or more races. Hispanic or Latino of any race were 2.3% of the population.

There were 242 households, of which 30.2% had children under the age of 18 living with them, 38.0% were married couples living together, 16.5% had a female householder with no husband present, 6.6% had a male householder with no wife present, and 38.8% were non-families. 34.7% of all households were made up of individuals, and 17.4% had someone living alone who was 65 years of age or older. The average household size was 2.38 and the average family size was 3.05.

The median age in the city was 43.1 years. 26.6% of residents were under the age of 18; 6.6% were between the ages of 18 and 24; 20.1% were from 25 to 44; 26.1% were from 45 to 64; and 20.5% were 65 years of age or older. The gender makeup of the city was 49.0% male and 51.0% female.

=== 2000 census ===
As of the census of 2000, there were 662 people, 275 households, and 168 families residing in the city. The population density was 454.0 inhabitants per square mile (175.3/km^{2}). There were 389 housing units at an average density of 266.8 per square mile (103.0/km^{2}). The racial makeup of the city was 71.45% White, 25.23% Native American, 0.15% Pacific Islander, and 3.17% from two or more races. Hispanic or Latino of any race were 1.06% of the population.

There were 275 households, out of which 26.2% had children under the age of 18 living with them, 44.7% were married couples living together, 11.6% had a female householder with no husband present, and 38.9% were non-families. 34.5% of all households were made up of individuals, and 19.6% had someone living alone who was 65 years of age or older. The average household size was 2.38 and the average family size was 3.06.

In the city, the population was spread out, with 28.4% under the age of 18, 5.4% from 18 to 24, 19.6% from 25 to 44, 22.4% from 45 to 64, and 24.2% who were 65 years of age or older. The median age was 43 years. For every 100 females, there were 88.6 males. For every 100 females age 18 and over, there were 78.9 males.

The median income for a household in the city was $25,395, and the median income for a family was $30,833. Males had a median income of $26,528 versus $18,281 for females. The per capita income for the city was $15,746. About 19.5% of families and 27.6% of the population were below the poverty line, including 37.7% of those under age 18 and 21.1% of those age 65 or over.
