= Rosholt, South Dakota =

- Town
- Location in Roberts County and the state of South Dakota
- Coordinates: 45°51′58″N 96°43′54″W
- Country: United States
- State: South Dakota
- County: Roberts
- Incorporated: 1913

Area
  - Total: 0.30 sq mi (0.77 km^{2})
  - Land: 0.30 sq mi (0.77 km^{2})
  - Water: 0 sq mi (0.00 km^{2})
- Elevation: 1,083 ft (330 m)

Population (2020)
  - Total: 379
  - Density: 1,281.9/sq mi (494.95/km^{2})
- Time zone: UTC-6 (Central (CST))
  - Summer (DST): UTC-5 (CDT)
- ZIP code: 57260
- Area code: 605
- FIPS code: 46-56340
- GNIS feature ID: 1267555
- Website: rosholtsd.com

Rosholt is a town in Roberts County, South Dakota, United States. The population was 379 at the 2020 census. Rosholt was laid out in 1913 and named in honor of Julius Rosholt, who was credited with bringing the railroad to town.

== Geography ==
According to the United States Census Bureau, the town has a total area of 0.30 square miles (0.78 km^{2}), all land.

== Demographics ==
Historical population
Census	Pop.	Note	%±
1920	301		—
1930	327		8.6%
1940	362		10.7%
1950	387		6.9%
1960	423		9.3%
1970	456		7.8%
1980	446		−2.2%
1990	408		−8.5%
2000	419		2.7%
2010	423		1.0%
2020	379		−10.4%
U.S. Decennial Census

=== 2010 census ===
As of the census of 2010, there were 423 people, 197 households, and 106 families residing in the town. The population density was 1,410.0 inhabitants per square mile (544.4/km^{2}). There were 228 housing units at an average density of 760.0 per square mile (293.4/km^{2}). The racial makeup of the town was 92.7% White, 3.3% Native American, and 4.0% from two or more races. Hispanic or Latino of any race were 0.2% of the population.

There were 197 households, of which 18.3% had children under the age of 18 living with them, 48.7% were married couples living together, 4.6% had a female householder with no husband present, 0.5% had a male householder with no wife present, and 46.2% were non-families. 45.2% of all households were made up of individuals, and 29.4% had someone living alone who was 65 years of age or older. The average household size was 1.95 and the average family size was 2.69.

The median age in the town was 53 years. 17.3% of residents were under the age of 18; 3.8% were between the ages of 18 and 24; 16.7% were from 25 to 44; 26.5% were from 45 to 64; and 35.7% were 65 years of age or older. The gender makeup of the town was 44.7% male and 55.3% female.

=== 2000 census ===
As of the census of 2000, there were 419 people, 168 households, and 107 families residing in the town. The population density was 1,403.8 inhabitants per square mile (542.0/km^{2}). There were 199 housing units at an average density of 666.7 per square mile (257.4/km^{2}). The racial makeup of the town was 93.79% White, 5.97% Native American and 0.24% Asian. Hispanic or Latino of any race were 0.48% of the population.

There were 168 households, out of which 25.6% had children under the age of 18 living with them, 59.5% were married couples living together, 3.6% had a female householder with no husband present, and 36.3% were non-families. 32.7% of all households were made up of individuals, and 20.2% had someone living alone who was 65 years of age or older. The average household size was 2.21 and the average family size was 2.83.

In the town, the population was spread out, with 20.8% under the age of 18, 4.3% from 18 to 24, 20.0% from 25 to 44, 18.4% from 45 to 64, and 36.5% who were 65 years of age or older. The median age was 50 years. For every 100 females, there were 78.3 males. For every 100 females age 18 and over, there were 74.7 males. The median income for a household in the town was $30,547, and the median income for a family was $37,292. Males had a median income of $31,250 versus $16,875 for females. The per capita income for the town was $15,437. About 9.2% of families and 18.8% of the population were below the poverty line, including 32.4% of those under age 18 and 22.6% of those age 65 or over.
