= Grenville, South Dakota =

Grenville, South Dakota Polaȟ (Dakota)
- Town
- Location in Day County and the state of South Dakota
- Coordinates: 45°28′01″N 97°23′25″W
- Country: United States
- State: South Dakota
- County: Day
- Incorporated: 1921

Area
  - Total: 0.24 sq mi (0.61 km^{2})
  - Land: 0.24 sq mi (0.61 km^{2})
  - Water: 0 sq mi (0.00 km^{2})
- Elevation: 1,860 ft (570 m)

Population (2020)
  - Total: 48
  - Density: 202.8/sq mi (78.31/km^{2})
- Time zone: UTC-6 (Central (CST))
  - Summer (DST): UTC-5 (CDT)
- ZIP code: 57239
- Area code: 605
- FIPS code: 46-26220
- GNIS feature ID: 1267409
- Website: www.grenvillesd.com

Grenville (Dakota: Polaȟ) is a town in Day County, South Dakota, United States. The population was 48 at the 2020 census.

Grenville was laid out in 1914, and named for the greenery of the original town site.

== Geography ==
According to the United States Census Bureau, the town has a total area of 0.24 square miles (0.62 km^{2}), all land.

== Demographics ==
Historical population
Census	Pop.	Note	%±
1930	247		—
1940	260		5.3%
1950	207		−20.4%
1960	151		−27.1%
1970	154		2.0%
1980	119		−22.7%
1990	81		−31.9%
2000	62		−23.5%
2010	54		−12.9%
2020	48		−11.1%
U.S. Decennial Census

=== 2010 census ===
As of the census of 2010, there were 54 people, 30 households, and 14 families residing in the town. The population density was 225.0 inhabitants per square mile (86.9/km^{2}). There were 44 housing units at an average density of 183.3 per square mile (70.8/km^{2}). The racial makeup of the town was 98.1% White and 1.9% African American.

There were 30 households, of which 10.0% had children under the age of 18 living with them, 33.3% were married couples living together, 3.3% had a female householder with no husband present, 10.0% had a male householder with no wife present, and 53.3% were non-families. 40.0% of all households were made up of individuals, and 26.6% had someone living alone who was 65 years of age or older. The average household size was 1.80 and the average family size was 2.29.

The median age in the town was 55 years. 11.1% of residents were under the age of 18; 3.9% were between the ages of 18 and 24; 11.2% were from 25 to 44; 50.1% were from 45 to 64; and 24.1% were 65 years of age or older. The gender makeup of the town was 55.6% male and 44.4% female.

=== 2000 census ===
As of the census of 2000, there were 62 people, 35 households, and 14 families residing in the town. The population density was 261.0 inhabitants per square mile (100.8/km^{2}). There were 46 housing units at an average density of 193.7 per square mile (74.8/km^{2}). The racial makeup of the town was 95.16% White, 3.23% Native American, and 1.61% from two or more races.

There were 35 households, out of which 20.0% had children under the age of 18 living with them, 28.6% were married couples living together, 2.9% had a female householder with no husband present, and 60.0% were non-families. 57.1% of all households were made up of individuals, and 28.6% had someone living alone who was 65 years of age or older. The average household size was 1.77 and the average family size was 2.50.

In the town, the population was spread out, with 19.4% under the age of 18, 1.6% from 18 to 24, 32.3% from 25 to 44, 24.2% from 45 to 64, and 22.6% who were 65 years of age or older. The median age was 44 years. For every 100 females, there were 138.5 males. For every 100 females age 18 and over, there were 138.1 males.

The median income for a household in the town was $10,000, and the median income for a family was $23,750. Males had a median income of $20,625 versus $16,875 for females. The per capita income for the town was $11,762. There were no families and 30.0% of the population living below the poverty line, including no under eighteens and 54.5% of those over 64.
