= Webster, South Dakota =

- City
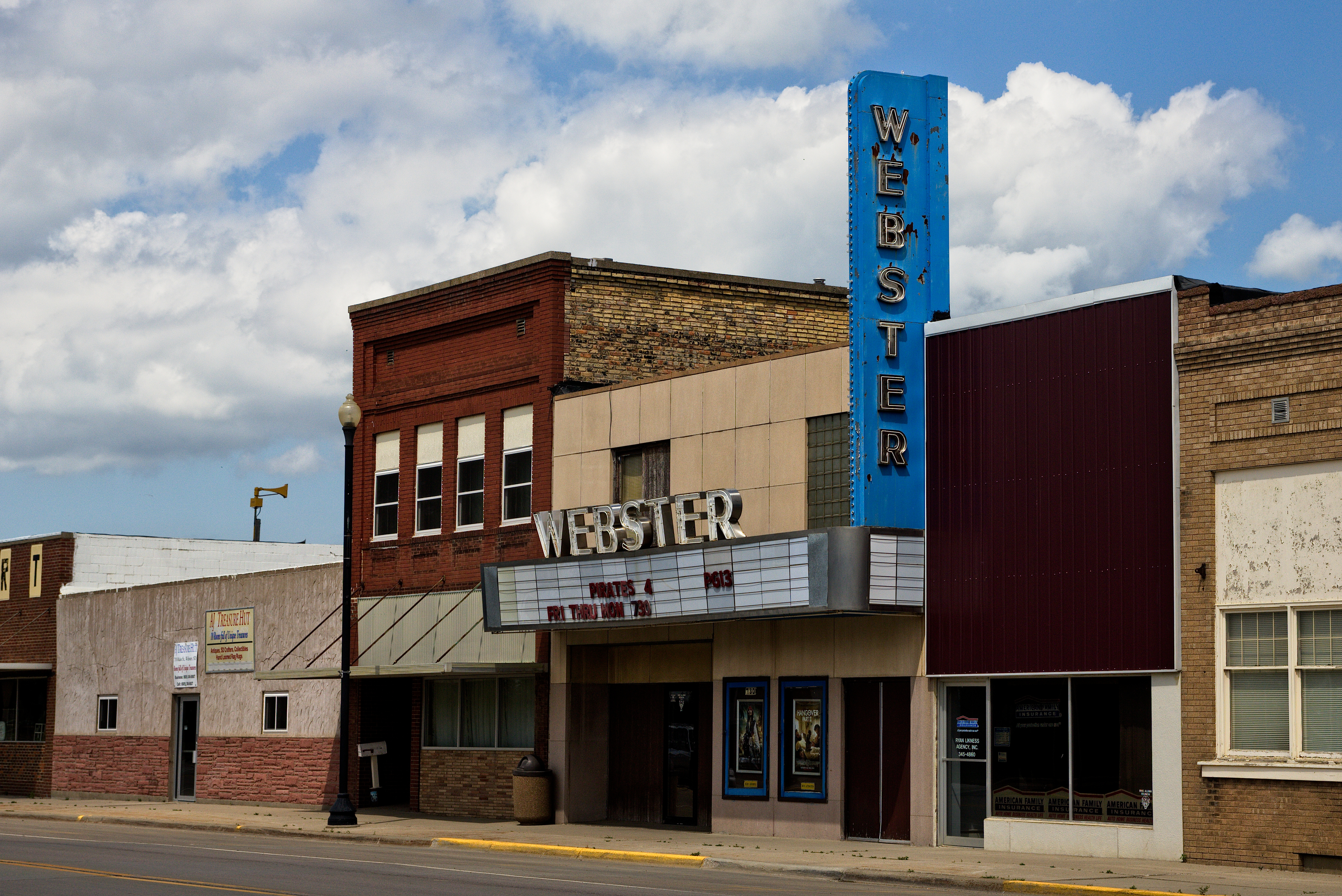
- Downtown Webster (July 2011)
- Motto: A Place for All Seasons
- Interactive map of Webster, South Dakota
- Location within South Dakota
- Coordinates: 45.3366°N 97.5230°W
- Country: United States
- State: South Dakota
- County: Day
- Platted: 1881
- Incorporated: February 23, 1895
- Named for: James Perry Webster

Government
  - Type: Mayor–Council
  - Mayor: Mike Grosek
  - President: Dale Miller
  - Councilmembers: Ward 1: Dale Miller & Toni Brown; Ward 2: Wayne Klungseth & Derek Sinner; Ward 3: Stacy Mount & Brian Vogl

Area
  - Total: 1.769 sq mi (4.582 km^{2})
  - Land: 1.769 sq mi (4.582 km^{2})
  - Water: 0 sq mi (0.000 km^{2}) 0.00%
- Elevation: 1,840 ft (560 m)

Population (2020)
  - Total: 1,728
  - Estimate (2025): 1,681
  - Density: 976.8/sq mi (377.1/km^{2})
- Time zone: UTC–6 (Central (CST))
  - Summer (DST): UTC–5 (CDT)
- ZIP Code: 57274
- Area code: 605
- FIPS code: 46-69780
- GNIS feature ID: 1267629
- Highways: US 12, SD 25
- Website: webstersd.com/city-of-webster

Webster is a city in and the county seat of Day County, South Dakota, United States. The population was 1,728 as of the 2020 census, and was estimated at 1,681 in 2025.

== History ==
The city of Webster was platted in 1881 and was incorporated on February 23, 1895, and named in honor of James Perry Webster, a pioneer settler.

== Geography ==
According to the United States Census Bureau, the city has a total area of 1.769 square miles (4.58 km^{2}), all land.

=== Climate ===
Climate data for Webster, South Dakota (1991−2020 normals, extremes 1893−present)
Month	Jan	Feb	Mar	Apr	May	Jun	Jul	Aug	Sep	Oct	Nov	Dec	Year
Record high °F (°C)	64 (18)	64 (18)	81 (27)	96 (36)	97 (36)	105 (41)	108 (42)	104 (40)	104 (40)	91 (33)	80 (27)	63 (17)	108 (42)
Mean daily maximum °F (°C)	20.4 (−6.4)	25.3 (−3.7)	38.0 (3.3)	52.9 (11.6)	66.4 (19.1)	76.0 (24.4)	80.9 (27.2)	79.0 (26.1)	70.7 (21.5)	55.4 (13.0)	38.8 (3.8)	25.4 (−3.7)	52.4 (11.3)
Daily mean °F (°C)	11.4 (−11.4)	15.8 (−9.0)	28.4 (−2.0)	42.4 (5.8)	55.8 (13.2)	66.1 (18.9)	71.0 (21.7)	69.0 (20.6)	60.2 (15.7)	45.5 (7.5)	30.0 (−1.1)	17.3 (−8.2)	42.7 (5.9)
Mean daily minimum °F (°C)	2.4 (−16.4)	6.3 (−14.3)	18.9 (−7.3)	31.9 (−0.1)	45.2 (7.3)	56.1 (13.4)	61.1 (16.2)	59.0 (15.0)	49.6 (9.8)	35.7 (2.1)	21.3 (−5.9)	9.2 (−12.7)	33.1 (0.6)
Record low °F (°C)	−36 (−38)	−43 (−42)	−32 (−36)	−6 (−21)	18 (−8)	23 (−5)	36 (2)	26 (−3)	17 (−8)	−1 (−18)	−29 (−34)	−34 (−37)	−43 (−42)
Average precipitation inches (mm)	0.84 (21)	0.75 (19)	1.11 (28)	2.22 (56)	3.39 (86)	3.97 (101)	4.02 (102)	2.97 (75)	2.56 (65)	2.47 (63)	0.71 (18)	1.06 (27)	26.07 (662)
Average snowfall inches (cm)	9.6 (24)	7.9 (20)	5.1 (13)	5.0 (13)	0.0 (0.0)	0.0 (0.0)	0.0 (0.0)	0.0 (0.0)	0.0 (0.0)	1.4 (3.6)	6.0 (15)	7.8 (20)	42.8 (109)
Average precipitation days (≥ 0.01 in)	4.8	4.4	3.9	5.8	9.5	10.3	8.9	7.3	6.9	6.2	4.0	4.7	76.7
Average snowy days (≥ 0.1 in)	5.0	4.6	2.6	1.5	0.0	0.0	0.0	0.0	0.0	0.8	2.7	4.7	21.9
Source: National Oceanic and Atmospheric Administration

== Demographics ==
Historical population
Census	Pop.	Note	%±
1890	618		—
1900	1,506		143.7%
1910	1,713		13.7%
1920	1,800		5.1%
1930	1,805		0.3%
1940	2,173		20.4%
1950	2,503		15.2%
1960	2,409		−3.8%
1970	2,252		−6.5%
1980	2,417		7.3%
1990	2,017		−16.5%
2000	1,952		−3.2%
2010	1,886		−3.4%
2020	1,728		−8.4%
2025 (est.)	1,681		−2.7%
U.S. Decennial Census; 2020 Census

According to realtor website Zillow, the average price of a home as of August 31, 2026, in Webster was $234,465.

As of the 2024 American Community Survey, there were 891 estimated households in Webster with an average of 2.05 persons per household. The city has a median household income of $55,179. Approximately 15.1% of the city's population lives at or below the poverty line. Webster has an estimated 59.9% employment rate, with 20.7% of the population holding a bachelor's degree or higher and 96.0% holding a high school diploma. There were 987 housing units at an average density of 557.94 per square mile (215.42/km^{2}).

The top five reported languages (people were allowed to report up to two languages, thus the figures will generally add to more than 100%) were English (93.5%), Spanish (4.6%), Indo-European (1.4%), Asian and Pacific Islander (0.1%), and Other (0.5%).

The median age in the city was 40.5 years.

Webster, South Dakota – racial and ethnic composition Note: the US Census treats Hispanic/Latino as an ethnic category. This table excludes Latinos from the racial categories and assigns them to a separate category. Hispanics/Latinos may be of any race.
Race / ethnicity (NH = non-Hispanic)	Pop. 1990	Pop. 2000	Pop. 2010	Pop. 2020	% 1990	% 2000	% 2010	% 2020
White alone (NH)	1,992	1,900	1,788	1,554	98.76%	97.34%	94.80%	89.93%
Black or African American alone (NH)	1	0	3	1	0.05%	0.00%	0.16%	0.06%
Native American or Alaska Native alone (NH)	19	24	44	39	0.94%	1.23%	2.33%	2.26%
Asian alone (NH)	1	2	4	10	0.05%	0.10%	0.21%	0.58%
Pacific Islander alone (NH)	—	1	0	1	—	0.05%	0.00%	0.06%
Other race alone (NH)	0	0	1	1	0.00%	0.00%	0.05%	0.06%
Mixed race or multiracial (NH)	—	20	32	50	—	1.02%	1.70%	2.89%
Hispanic or Latino (any race)	4	5	14	72	0.20%	0.26%	0.74%	4.17%
Total	2,017	1,952	1,886	1,728	100.00%	100.00%	100.00%	100.00%

=== 2020 census ===
As of the 2020 census, there were 1,728 people, 814 households, and 413 families residing in the city. The population density was 1,065.35 inhabitants per square mile (411.33/km^{2}). There were 961 housing units at an average density of 592.48 per square mile (228.76/km^{2}). The racial makeup of the city was 90.05% White, 0.17% African American, 2.26% Native American, 0.58% Asian, 0.06% Pacific Islander, 0.58% from some other races and 6.31% from two or more races. Hispanic or Latino people of any race were 4.17% of the population.

=== 2010 census ===
As of the 2010 census, there were 1,886 people, 878 households and 481 families residing in the city. The population density was 1,262.38 inhabitants per square mile (487.41/km^{2}). There were 1,007 housing units at an average density of 674.03 per square mile (260.24/km^{2}). The racial makeup of the city was 95.12% White, 0.16% African American, 2.33% Native American, 0.21% Asian, 0.00% Pacific Islander, 0.32% from some other races and 1.86% from two or more races. Hispanic or Latino people of any race were 0.74% of the population.

There were 878 households, of which 25.4% had children under the age of 18 living with them, 41.8% were married couples living together, 9.1% had a female householder with no husband present, 3.9% had a male householder with no wife present, and 45.2% were non-families. 41.0% of all households were made up of individuals, and 21% had someone living alone who was 65 years of age or older. The average household size was 2.08 and the average family size was 2.81.

The median age was 46.3 years. 22.9% of residents were under the age of 18; 6.4% were between the ages of 18 and 24; 19.2% were from 25 to 44; 26% were from 45 to 64; and 25.5% were 65 years of age or older. The gender makeup of the city was 47.3% male and 52.7% female.

=== 2000 census ===
As of the 2000 census, there were 1,952 people, 866 households and 512 families residing in the city. The population density was 1,308.86 inhabitants per square mile (505.35/km^{2}). There were 1,023 housing units at an average density of 685.94 per square mile (264.84/km^{2}). The racial makeup of the city was 97.49% White, 0.00% African American, 1.23% Native American, 0.10% Asian, 0.05% Pacific Islander, 0.05% from some other races and 1.08% from two or more races. Hispanic or Latino people of any race were 0.26% of the population.

There were 866 households, of which 25.5% had children under the age of 18 living with them, 48.8% were married couples living together, 6.9% had a female householder with no husband present, and 40.8% were non-families. 37.8% of all households were made up of individuals, and 23.2% had someone living alone who was 65 years of age or older. The average household size was 2.18 and the average family size was 2.86.

23.2% of the population were under the age of 18, 5.6% from 18 to 24, 23.5% from 25 to 44, 20.7% from 45 to 64, and 27.0% who were 65 years of age or older. The median age was 43 years. For every 100 females, there were 87.7 males. For every 100 females age 18 and over, there were 83.8 males.

The median household income was $29,457 and the median family income was $40,982. Males had a median income of $30,121 compared with $18,380 for females. The per capita income was $16,398. Approximately 9.0% of families and 11.3% of the population were below the poverty line, including 11.4% of those under age 18 and 8.5% of those age 65 or over.

== Education ==
The Webster Area School District 18-5

- Webster Area High School - 01 (9-12)
- Webster Area Middle School - 02 (6-8)
- Webster Area Elementary School - 03 (PK-5)

The area is served by the Webster Area School District 18-5. It operates the Webster School. In the 2025-26 academic year, the district reported a total of 551 students.

== Media ==
Reporter and Farmer is Day County's newspaper.

== Notable people ==
- Sigurd Anderson – Governor of South Dakota, 1951–1954
- Tom Brokaw – retired television anchorman for NBC, born in Webster
- Jerry Brudos – Oregon serial killer, born in Webster
- Brock Lesnar – WWE professional wrestler and former mixed martial artist, amateur wrestler and professional American football player, born in Webster
- Creighton Leland Robertson – Episcopalian bishop and lawyer, practiced law in Webster
- Lee Schoenbeck – lawyer and current president pro tempore of the South Dakota State Senate, born in Webster
- William Garner Waddel – South Dakota state senator, former mayor of Webster

== See also ==
- List of cities in South Dakota
