= Round Lake =

Round Lake may refer to:

== Buildings ==
- Round Lake (gymnastics)

== Communities ==
=== United States ===
- Round Lake, Florida, an unincorporated community
- Round Lake, Illinois, a village
  - Round Lake station
- Round Lake, Michigan, a historic settlement
- Round Lake, Minnesota, a city
- Round Lake, New York, a village
- Round Lake, Wisconsin, a town

== Lakes ==
=== Canada ===
- Round Lake (Ontario), near Pembroke
- Round Lake (Saskatchewan)
- Round Lake (RM of Kelvington, Saskatchewan)
- Round Lake (Vancouver Island)

=== United States ===
- Round Lake (Dallas County, Arkansas), a lake of Dallas County, Arkansas
- Round Lake (Florida lake), Polk County
- Round Lake (Bonner County, Idaho)
- Round Lake (Michigan), index page with a list of 80+ lakes named or formerly named Round Lake, including:
  - Round Lake (Alger and Delta Counties, Michigan), in Delta County in the Upper Peninsula
  - Round Lake (Berrien County, Michigan)
  - Round Lake (Emmet County, Michigan)
- Round Lake (Minnesota), nearly 60 different lakes by this name, including:
  - Round Lake (Eden Prairie)
- Round Lake in Teton County, Montana
- Round Lake (Oneida County, New York)
- Round Lake (Saratoga County, New York)
- Round Lake (St. Lawrence County, New York)
- Round Lake National Natural Landmark, near Syracuse, New York
- Round Lake (Clark County, South Dakota)
- Round Lake (Deuel County, South Dakota)
- Round Lake (Lake County, South Dakota)
- Round Lake (Clark County, Washington), in Camas
- Round Lake (Snohomish County, Washington)
- Round Lake (Wisconsin)
