= Jayville, New York =

Jayville
- Hamlet
- Location within the state of New York on the East side of the river
- Coordinates: 44°9′15″N 75°11′20″W
- Country: United States
- State: New York
- County: St. Lawrence
- Elevation: 1,119 ft (341 m)

Population (2000)
  - Total: 0
- Time zone: UTC-5 (Eastern (EST))
  - Summer (DST): UTC-4 (EDT)
- Postal code: 13648
- Area code: 315

Jayville was a hamlet located in the southwest part of St. Lawrence County, New York, in the United States. The hamlet started as a mining community in 1850 on what eventually became the Carthage and Adirondack Railroad. Its existence was short lived as its non-favorable mineral composition and difficult ore availability was abandoned in favor of neighboring Benson Mines, located 14 miles (23 km) down the railroad to the east. After mining stopped in the community, other industries such as saw mills kept the population busy. Ultimately, these business were short lived. A further attempt to reopen the mines in 1914 failed and an eventual fire ended the existence of the hamlet of Jayville. Today remnants of the hamlet can be found off the now abandoned railroad station located on New York State owned land southeast of Harrisville on Jayville Road.

== History ==
1850-1880: According to old reports, the Jayville property was opened for iron ore in 1854 by Z.H. Benton. Little ore was removed at that time. In 1886, upon completion of the Carthage and Adirondack Railroad to Jayville, the property was leased from Beton by the Bryon D. Benson interest. Operation by the Bensons, under the name of the Magnetic Iron Ore Co, continued to 1888, in which year the property was abandoned in favor of the deposit at Little River (now Benson Mines)

1880s: One of the most significant events if Jayville history was in 1884 when New York State commissioned the building of the Carthage and Adirondack railroad to run from Carthage to Jayville. This railroad was completed in 1887. Later in 1889 the railroad was continued to Benson Mines.

Mining thrived in the 1880s. Prior to 1889, the Megnetic Iron Ore Company had expended a large amount of money in building a railroad to the mines at Jayville, NY, developing them and securing the property at little river, before it was finally discovered that ore of good quality, in its natural state, could not be taken from the mines in paying quantities. It was therefore decided by the company that the only thing to be done, to save the investment in these properties, was to establish a large concentrating plant at Little River – now Benson Mines – and to extend the railroad to that point.

1890s: During the 1890s sawmills were opened in the hamlet of Jayville. Sawmills ultimately replaced the mining activity in Jayville. In 1892, costly litigation over mineral rights and railroad tariffs that traveled through private land owned by Proctor (Proctor vs Benson) ultimately stopped mining in the hamlet. Throughout the 1890s and through the early 1900s, Jayville remained in existence surviving on Railroad traffic and saw mill industries.

1900s: In 1914, the mines were attempted to be reopened; however this attempt was short lived and activity in the hamlet slowly wound down to its eventual demise in history. Mr. Howard Hughes bought the mines property and sunk a lot of money pumping the water out of the old pits. He operated at a loss for about 3 years and then closed them. The mother lode of ore hiding under Twin Ponds was the goal, but water kept seeping in and filled them as fast as they could be pumped out.

1940s: In 1941 the Jones & Laughlin Steel Corp made geologic, dip-needle and Hotchkiss superdip surveys of the area on a scale of 1:600 and drilled eight inclined holes whole total length was 2,366 feet. Most of the diamond-drill holes were 200 to 250 feet deep, but several were 350 to 450 deep. As a result of this exploration, the company concluded that the property was of little interest as a potential producer of lump ore.

== Railroad ==
=== Railroad Companies ===
- Black River and St. Lawrence Railway:The company was reorganized as the Carthage and Adirondack Railway in the spring of 1883 after a mine owner in Jayville acquired the Black River and St. Lawrence Railway. He planned to extend the rails from Little River in St. Lawrence County to Jayville. Construction of the extension was completed in 1889.
- The Carthage and Adirondack Railroad: In 1883, the Carthage & Adirondack Railroad was chartered to finish a line begun in 1869 as the Black River and St. Lawrence Railway, originally laid with maple wood rails as far as Natural Bridge. Relaid with iron rails by the C&A, it connected with the U&BR and the CW&SH at Carthage. The line was opened to a remote mining community known as Jayville by 1887; pushed on to Little River (Benson Mines) by 1889; and extended to Newton Falls (its current terminus) in 1896.
- The New York Central Railroad: This rail company led the railroad in 1893 and in 1896 was responsible for extending the railroad from Benson Mines to Newton Falls.

=== Railroad station ===
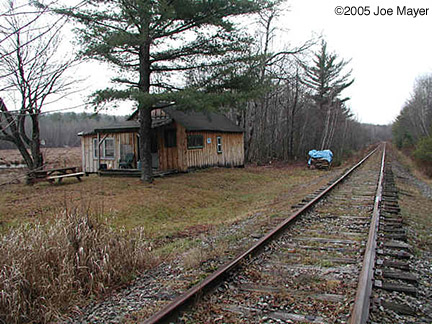
Jayville station in 2005

==== Location ====
A railroad station existed at Jayville. The Jayville stop on the railroad was labeled as 4E. Its exact location was plotted by the USGS in 1913. That location is: 44°9′15″N 75°11′20″W.

==== Workers ====
As was customary for the times a telegrapher was stationed at Jayville. The position of telegrapher was a union job, organized in New York State under the Order of Railroad Telegraphers. In 1913 it was noted that Brother Seamen was the telegrapher for the hamlet.

==== Train schedule ====
As published by the Rand-McNally in 1902, there were three trains that ran through Jayville. (437,487,451) The train schedule was published by the New York Central & Hudson Railroad and posted under the Carthage and Adirondack Branch.

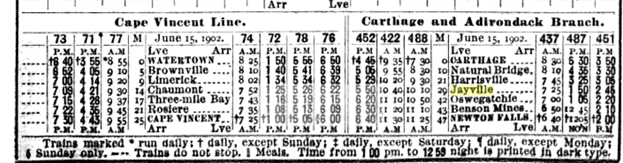

== Mining ==
=== Early mining and furnaces ===
The earliest mentions of Ore being removed from Jayville date all the way back to 1833. At that time a blast furnace was built by the Fuller brothers at Fullervulle, southwest of Edwards. It operated on ores from Little York mine, bog ores from Edwards, and magnetic ores from Jaayville and Clifton. This furnace was closed in 1882.

The next know uses of Jayville Magnetite was in 1855. The Alpine Host-blast Charcoal furnace was built in 1846. This furnace was owned by Z.H. Benton of Oxbow. Its location was southwest of Antwerp on the outlet of Boney Lake. 1,218 tonnes of iron out of red hematite ore from Kearney or Indian Lake mine, mixed with black magnetite from the Jayville bed was used at the furnace.

Also around this time speculation of an abundance of magnetic iron ore was starting to build at Jayville. At the time in the 1850s over 100 tons were taken from the Jayville Mines.

One of the most significant figures in increasing mine activity at Jayville was Z.H. Benton. It was said that the Carthage & Adirondack Railway owes its existence to Colonel Benton as he was unceasing in their efforts to establish a link to the Jayville mines.

=== Mineral composition ===
The ore quality that was taken from Jayville was said to be of the utmost quality. Some very rich specimens of magnetic ore from the Jayville mine were shown in the Main Building at the May 5th, 1877 Iron Ores of the United States Philadelphia Exhibition.

Four specimens represent the Jayville Mine; taken June 22, 1881:

1. Magnetite, pyroxene (40857)
2. Magnetite, pyrite (40872)
3. Magnetite (40855)
4. Magnetite, (40860)

The mine has yielded several tens of thousands of tons of magnetite ore; associated with the magnetite ore are supergene hematite, vonsenite, Fluorite in dar mica skarn, pyroxeneamphibole skarn and quartz-bearing amphibole skarn. Parts of the amphibole skarn and the iron ore are rish in Fluorite; this type of skarn is as much as a few feet thick and ranges from 20 to 60 percent fluorite. If the iron deposit is mined again, Fluorite and vonsenite should be considered as coproducts.

=== New mining techniques ===
Because of the magnetic properties of the ore in Jayville, new technologies were used, most notably the Magnetic Separation of Iron Ore. In 1895 the Ball-Norton electro-magnetic separator was used in a number of plants built and experiments made for magnetic separation, notably those at Benson Mines in St. Lawrence county, New York; at the Jayville mine and at the Mineville in Essex county.

=== Mine layout ===
In Jayville, the ore occurrences presents a phase quite dissimilar from that of Benson Mines and more like the magnetite deposits on the east side of the Adirondacks. There are innumerable shoots, lenses and irregular bunches in which the magnetite is found showing sharp boundaries in contact with the wall rock. The latter is for the most part a hornblende-biotite gneiss of sedimentary appearance. The horizon of the ore lie close to the contact of the gneiss with a red pegmatitic hornblende granite. Outcrops of the granite occur to the north and east within short distances where they break through and cut off the gneiss area in such a way that their intrusive character is plainly evidenced. In some of the openings the granite can be seen in immediate contact with the ore. The openings are on the northeastern and northwestern slopes of a low ridge of gneiss that rises just west of the railroad. The pits nearest the station are Hart no 1 and no2 of which the first is said to be 300 feet deep following a shoot 20 feet wide and 10 feet thick. Hart no2 is much shallower. At the northeastern end of the ridge where it curves to the west are the pits called New York no 1 and no 2, both of inconsiderable depth. Benson no1 farther to the west is reported by Smock to have depth of 250 feet on the incline; of its two levels the upper is about 25 feet long and the lower driven at a point 60 feet from the bottom of the slope runs off in a southerly direction for 160 feet and then north 60 feet. The pit supplied most of the shipping ore. Between Benson no 1 and no 2 an adit has been excavated into the hill on a lead which in the interior develops into a lens some 60 or 70 feet long and 20 feet wide. The Fuller and Essler pits are located at the extreme west, the former being opened on a pod of ore 50 feet wide, dipping 45 degrees west.

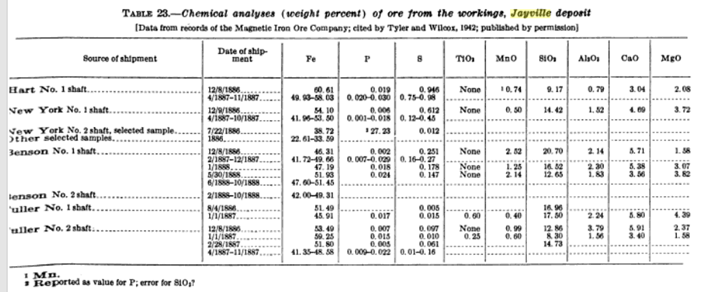
Jayville Mineral Composition by Mine Shaft

The distribution of the ore in disconnected bodies which pitch and strike in all directions has probably resulted from the intrusion of granite. The bodies occupy approximately the same horizon and have the aspect of an originally continuous band which has been disrupted and faulted. The intrusion has exercised also a metamorphic influence upon the deposits shown by the abundance of garnet and hornblende that often replace the magnetite almost completely. Well-developed titanite crystals of unusual size are found in the contact zone. The analysis taken below from Putnams report, gives the composition of the Jayville ore. It was made from a sample of 500 tons mined in 1880 and shipped to the furnace at Alpine.

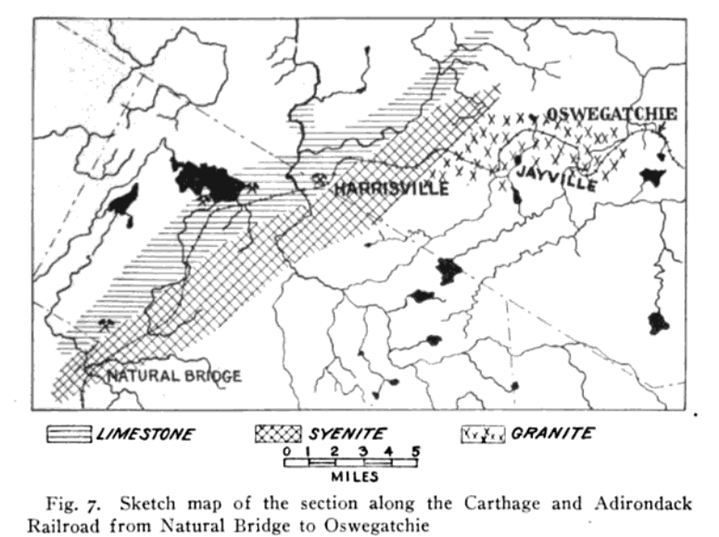
Jayville Quarry Materials

More information on the mine layout and shaft coordinates can be found in the Geological Survey professional paper, Volumes 376-377

=== Most recent prospecting ===
When Lump ore was at a premium, just before WWII, the Jayville property seemed promising enough to warrant exploration. Accordingly, in 1941 the Jones & Laughlin Steel Corp made geologic, dip-needle and Hotchkiss superdip surveys of the area on a scale of 1:600 and drilled eight inclined holes whole total length was 2,366 feet. Most of the diamond-drill holes were 200 to 250 feet deep, but several were 350 to 450 deep. As a result of this exploration, the company concluded that the property was of little interest as a potential producer of lump ore.

In the winter of 1947, USGS performed a study on the Jayville mines. The agency found an unidentifiable metallic mineral in ore from two drill holes at the Jayville magnetite deposit. The striking optical properties of the unknown set it apart from other metallics that had been investigated mineragraphically. It was thought for a while that the unknown might be ilvaite. In the spring of 1950, the USGS investigated the unknown.

== Saw mills ==
In the early 1890s, as mining was starting to be less fruitful as once anticipated, the timber on the land started to attract the attention of investors. Throughout the course of the hamlet's history, three separate investment groups operated sawmills in Jayville.

=== Post and Henderson Company ===
The partnership of Robert G Post and Washington J Henderson made its first venture into the Adirondacks in the early 1890s with a small sawmill in Jayville. Production in the mid-1890s was four million board feet of lumber yearly. However, once again, Jayville lost out to Benson Mines as in 1898 a much larger sawmill was built in the village of Benson Mines. In 1900 the two partners formed the post and Henderson Company.

The day-to-day operation of the mill was run by W.J. Henderson. The superintendent at the Post & Henderson was John Peter Kirch. His yearly salary was $1,200. John Peter Kirch would later become famous for running away on his family for a younger woman, Mrs. Hattie Covey, who was then tarred and feathered for her actions.

=== J. S. Demott ===
J.S. Demott, who was from Oswego, in 1894 operated a Steam powered saw mill in Jayville.

=== Mecca Lumber Company ===
In 1903 Nellis, Ames & Swift who ran an old and substantial lumber concern in Utica, NY purchased a timber tract of 7,000 acres around Jayville. The actual location of the Mill was Kalurah, NY. They immediately begin the erection of a large steam saw mill at a convenient point near the center of the purchase, building a railroad switch from the track of the Carthage and Adirondack Railroad at Jayville to the plant. The mill was said to have been built using modern construction equipment and large capacity and was operated wholly in the manufacture of hardwood lumber. This mill was touted to have been equipped band saws.

The mill was built on a settlement known as Little Mill. The company renamed the settlement Kalurah, named after a Masonic Lodge in Binghamton. The sawmill was relatively small, producing about 30,000 board feet of logs daily. However, in 1907, the mill was the 7th largest producing mill in New York State. The Mecca Lumber company produced a large quantity of railroad ties using the hardwood on the land. The Mecca Lumber Company ceased operation in 1910. On May 24, 1910, The New York Central Railroad company petitioned New York State to discontinued freight and ticketing service at the Kalurah station, thus ending the majority of mill functions. The sawmill was operated by Alfred Kilbourne up until 1920 when the land was sold to the State of New York for $45,000.

== Education ==
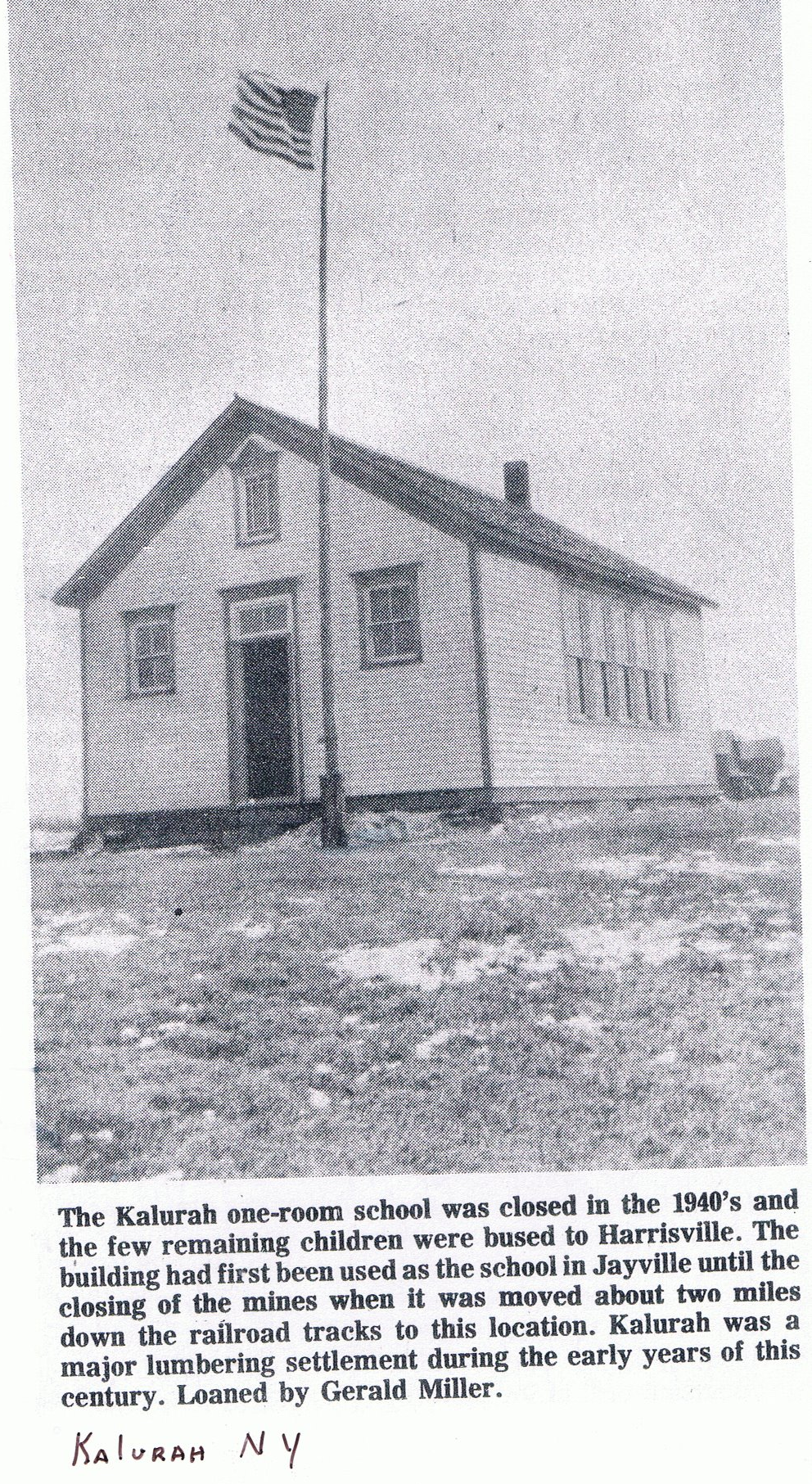

In 1887 school district No 10 was formed in Pitcairn for Jayville students by George A Lewis, School Commissioner. He wrote to NYS in a letter, "In August last, I issued an order forming school district No 10, in the town of Pitcairn, to meet the educational wants of the mining village known as Jayville."

Later in the 1890s, this school was known as Jayville School No 1. During this time George W. Backus was a trustee of the Jayville school. Mr. Backus eventually married Miss Pina Mae Seelya who was a teacher at the local school.

After the closing of the Jayville mines, the one-room school building was moved down the tracks to Kalurah, where it remained there until 1940.

== Religion ==
In the early 1880s the St. Francis Solanus parish was formed in Harrisville, Ny by Rev. E. C. Laramee. Under Jeremiah Manning, Jayville was a mission. In 1907 Harrisville, Kalurah, Natural Bridge and Lewisburg formed a parish. The parish territory included the mission at Fine and Taleville, each of which had a church, and the stations at Jayville, Edwards and Fullerville.

== Hunting ==
Hunting was a way of life for local residents of Jayville. In 1902, NYS conducted a deer population study in the growing response for information on large animals of the Adirondack Region. In 1902 deer shipments were measured using carcase shipments with the aide of the American and National express Companies. During this time 30% more deer were secured by hunters in the area. A general rule was used that 4 deer were killed in the woods for every one that shipped out by rail. In 1902, a total of two deer carcases were shipped out of Jayville, while neighboring Harrisville shipped 35. Note that in Harrisville that year, a 253 lb deer was taken from the region. It was noted that the Adirondack deer, when properly protected, will develop a size and weight fully equal to or surpassing that of species in any other locality in North America.

== Jayville Tar and Feathering ==
Unfortunately, Jayville's most nationally acclaimed moment was the result of an lustrous affair that resulted in a public tar and feathering of a female resident, Mrs Hattie Covey. The story was so sensational that it was published in the New York Times on July 31, 1895.

As the story goes, Mrs Covey who was married jumped a train out of town with Saw Mill Superintendent John Kirch, who was married and had children. It was rumored that the two ran off to Ohio. After two months Hattie Covey returned to Carthage to visit her parents. Coincidence would have it that Mrs. Kirch was also on this train. Later that evening two men showed up at Hattie's mother's house and threatened to tar and feather Hattie Covey if she did not leave town immediately. That next morning, Mrs. Covey, her mother and brothers went to Pircairn to a judge to swear out a warrant for arrest of the two men who had threatened her the night before. The family then returned to Jayville that night. The Daily Journal of July 31, 1895 then explains what happened next:

When the train stopped at the station, the mother and daughter got off of the rear platform and walked to the front of the train, where they were suddenly surrounded by a crowd of men who seized the daughter and took her into the railroad freight house, where they stripped her. There was a crowd of women there, dressed in men's clothes and with blackened faces. The men held the women down on the floor, while the women applied the tar and feathers with a paint brush, completely covering her with the stuff, after which they left her. She was taken to her mother's house, where a physician was called. It was found that one arm and a number of ribs were broken. It is said to be doubtful if she lives.

Within a few days the attackers of Mrs Covey were arrested and a trial was held for the five known attackers.

The story was so popular that it reached news papers as far away as Utah.

== Notable residents ==
- Colonel Zebulon H. Benton :Married Caroline Benton who was the daughter of Joseph Bonaparte who was the former king of Spain and the brother of Napoleon.
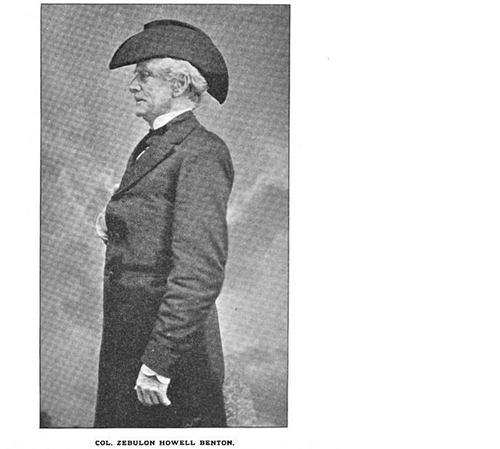
  Colonel Zebulon Benton
  Colonel Zebulon H. Benton was engaged from time to time in grate enterprises, especially those of land, mining and railroading. The capital invested in these sometime exceeding a million dollars. His ventures, often gigantic, were not confined to Lewis and St. Lawrence counties, but extended into the Canadas, to the Gulf of Mexico and even into the South America. The mines at Rossie, Clifton, Jayville and Alpine are examples of these operations. We are convinced that the Carthage & Adirondack Railway owes its existence to Colonel Benton as he was unceasing in their errors to establish that line to the Jayville mines. ZH Benton Owned Aplina blast furnace and 40,000 acres that it sat on. Built in 46, started operating in 1848. Zebulon Benton was a native of Oxbow and son of the well-known Dr. Abner Benton as well as being considered a favorite of Joseph Bonaparte's while growing up. Later he became a commander during the Civil War. It was said that he liked to be called "Colonel" even after the war, and was well known as wearing a Napoleonic type of hat turned sideways his great-grandson, Frederick Joseph Benton born 1954 lived for some time at the Waldorf Astoria New York
- Hattie Nervin Covey:
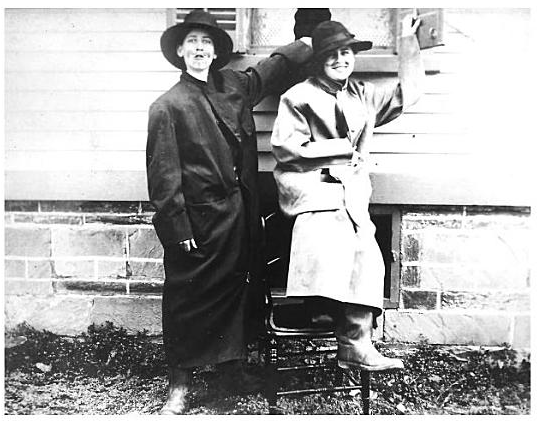
  Mrs. Hattie Covey
  Mrs. Covey was a French Canadian descendant who was tarred and feathered in Jayville, Ny in 1895. She lived in the hamlet with her mother Mrs. Julia Nervin who ran a boarding house in the community.
- Laura Kirch: Wife of John Kirch who left her in 1895 to go have an affair with Mrs Hattie Covey
- Charles Kirch: Son of Laura Kirch, 1895, arrested in tar and feathering of Mrs Covey
- Eugene Olen, 1895 arrested in tar and feathering of Mrs Covey
- George Clark: station agent at Jayville and son-in-law of the Kirches, 1895 arrested in tar and feathering of Mrs Covey
- Stein Ferguson, 1895 arrested in tar and feathering of Mrs Covey
- George W Backus: telegraph operator and Postmaster in 1903
- Miss Pina Mae Seelye: teacher at Jayville. She became interested in telegraphy and George Backus taught her to become an expert operator. She was hired by the New York Centrail Railroad in 1902 as an operator and married Mr. Backus in 1901.

== Jayville Junction (play) ==
Title Jayville Junction: An Hour and a Half of Comedy in a Railroad Depot Denison's specialties Author Harry Lee Newton Publisher T. S. Denison, 1906 Length 38 pages
