= Newton Falls =

Newton Falls may refer to:

- Newton Falls, Ohio
- Newton Falls, New York
- Newton Lower Falls, Massachusetts
- Newton Upper Falls, Massachusetts
