= Clifton, New York =

- Town
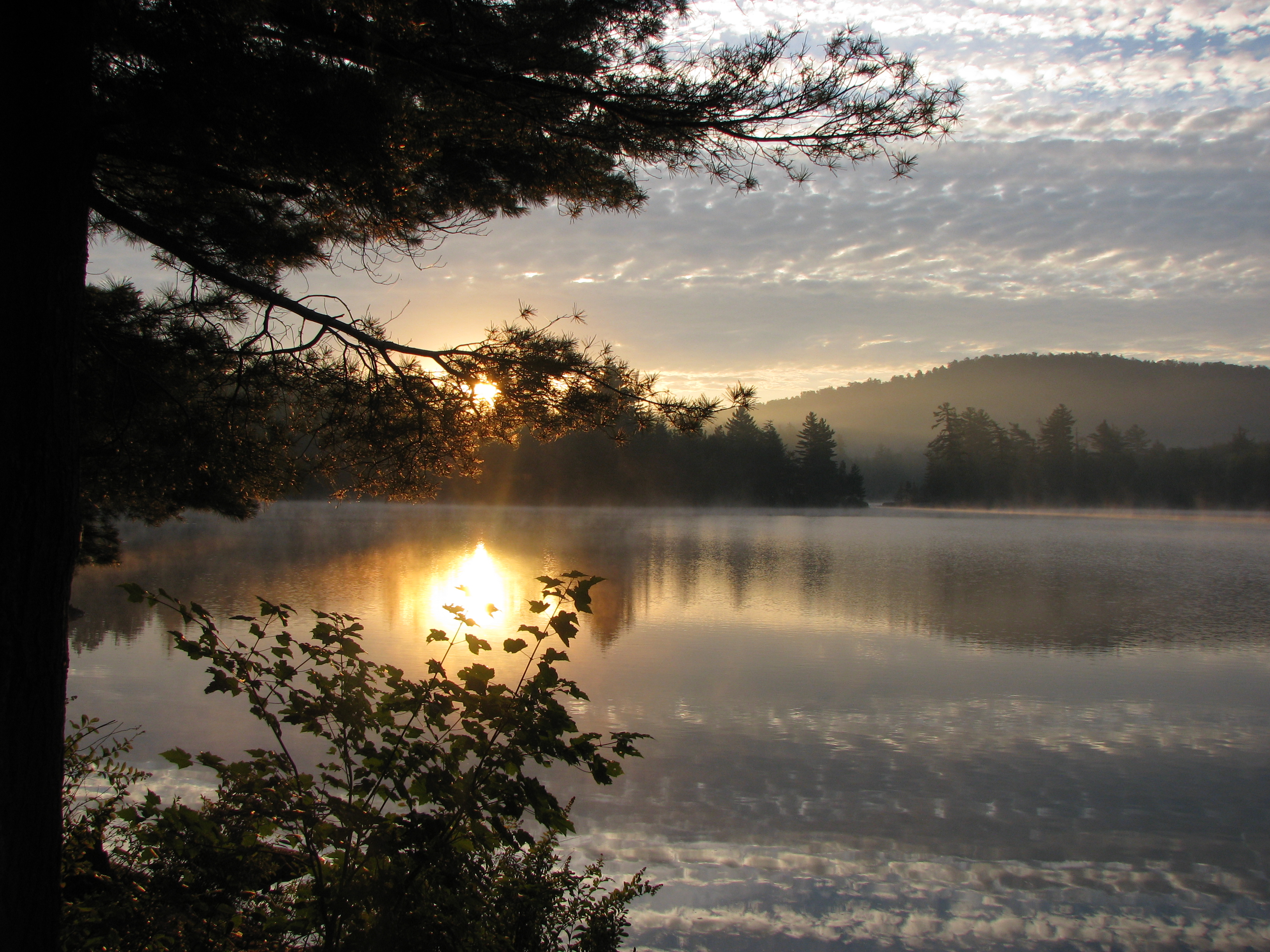
- Cranberry Lake, Black Duck Hole

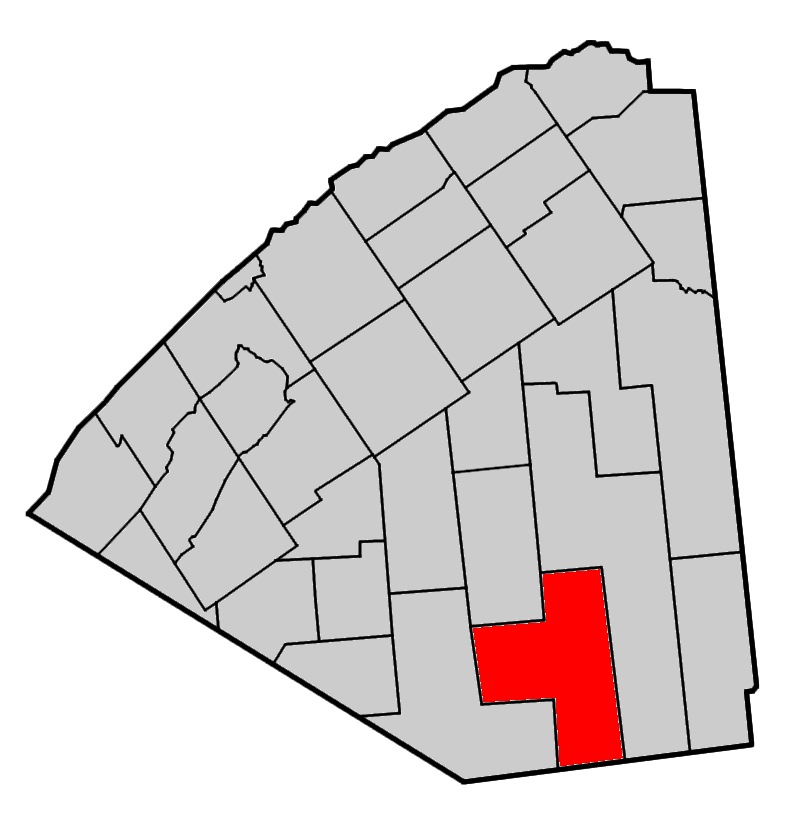
- Map highlighting Clifton's location within St. Lawrence County.

- Location within the state of New York
- Coordinates: 44°12′49″N 74°56′57″W
- Country: United States
- State: New York
- County: St. Lawrence

Area
  - Total: 150.34 sq mi (389.39 km^{2})
  - Land: 134.35 sq mi (347.96 km^{2})
  - Water: 16.00 sq mi (41.44 km^{2})
- Elevation: 1,660 ft (506 m)

Population (2020)
  - Total: 675
- Time zone: UTC-5 (Eastern (EST))
  - Summer (DST): UTC-4 (EDT)
- FIPS code: 36-16287
- GNIS feature ID: 0978838
- Website: https://www.townofcliftonny.com/

Clifton is a town in St. Lawrence County, New York, United States. The population was 675 at the 2020 census. The town takes its name from a mining company.

The Town of Clifton is in the southern part of the county, within the Adirondack Park.

== History ==
The first settlers came to work at the Clifton Iron Mine circa 1866, which built its first iron furnace the same year.

The town was formed in 1868 from the Town of Pierrepont. The first town meeting was held in the office of the Clifton Iron Mine.

Early inhabitants arrived to work the local mines.

== Geography ==
According to the United States Census Bureau, the town has a total area of 150.4 square miles (390 km^{2}), of which 135.1 square miles (350 km^{2}) is land and 15.2 square miles (39 km^{2}) (10.13%) is water.

Part of the southern town line is the border of Hamilton and Herkimer counties.

The Oswegatchie River flows through the town. Cranberry Lake, a large Adirondack lake occupies much of the eastern part of the town.

New York State Route 3 crosses the town as a major east–west highway.

== Demographics ==
Historical population
Census	Pop.	Note	%±
1870	221		—
1880	71		−67.9%
1890	342		381.7%
1900	1,382		304.1%
1910	1,674		21.1%
1920	1,573		−6.0%
1930	1,291		−17.9%
1940	1,005		−22.2%
1950	1,382		37.5%
1960	1,306		−5.5%
1970	1,207		−7.6%
1980	1,005		−16.7%
1990	917		−8.8%
2000	791		−13.7%
2010	751		−5.1%
2020	675		−10.1%
U.S. Decennial Census

As of the census of 2000, there were 791 people, 323 households, and 215 families residing in the town. The population density was 5.9 people per square mile (2.3 people/km^{2}). There were 775 housing units at an average density of 5.7 units per square mile (2.2 units/km^{2}). The racial makeup of the town was 96.08% White, 1.52% Native American, 0.88% from other races, and 1.52% from two or more races. Hispanic or Latino of any race were 1.52% of the population.

There were 323 households, out of which 25.1% had children under the age of 18 living with them, 53.3% were married couples living together, 9.6% had a female householder with no husband present, and 33.4% were non-families. 26.9% of all households were made up of individuals, and 13.6% had someone living alone who was 65 years of age or older. The average household size was 2.44 and the average family size was 2.90.

In the town, the population was spread out, with 24.3% under the age of 18, 5.3% from 18 to 24, 25.4% from 25 to 44, 28.3% from 45 to 64, and 16.7% who were 65 years of age or older. The median age was 42 years. For every 100 females, there were 101.3 males. For every 100 females age 18 and over, there were 95.8 males.

The median income for a household in the town was $33,950, and the median income for a family was $38,875. Males had a median income of $34,583 versus $23,500 for females. The per capita income for the town was $15,619. About 13.1% of families and 17.4% of the population were below the poverty line, including 25.8% of those under age 18 and 8.5% of those age 65 or over.

== Communities and locations in Clifton ==
- Bear Mountain – An elevation southeast of Cranberry Lake village.
- Benson Mines – A location in the southwestern part of the town that was one of the original settlements of the town.
- Brown's Falls Reservoir – A reservoir located west of Newton Falls.
- Buck Island – A small island in Cranberry Lake, southeast of Joe Indian Island.
- Clarksboro – A former hamlet, site of the Clifton ore reduction mill, remains of which are still visible at Twin Falls.
- Cooks Corners – A hamlet near the western town line, northwest of Cranberry Lake village, also referred to as the Windfall.
- Cranberry Lake – A hamlet in the eastern part of the town, on the north shore of Cranberry Lake. The population is about 850. The community is on New York State Route 3.
- Cranberry Lake – A lake on the east branch of the Oswegatchie River. It is the third largest lake in the Adirondack Park.
- Dead Creek Flow – A part of Cranberry lake in the southwestern part of Clifton.
- Joe Indian Island – An island of Cranberry Lake.
- Lows Lake – The northwest part of the lake is in the southeastern corner of Clifton.
- Newton Falls – A hamlet near the western part of the town on County Road 60.
- Newton Falls Reservoir – A reservoir located east of Newton Falls.
- Olmstead Pond – A lake located south of Cranberry Lake.
- Star Lake – A hamlet and resort area in the southwestern part of the town on NY-3 and on the eastern shore of a lake also called Star Lake.
