= List of Omega Phi Beta chapters =

Omega Phi Beta is a Latina collegiate sorority that was created in 1989. The sorority has undergraduate (collegiate) and alumnae (professional) chapters. It also has colonies which it calls collectives.

== Collegiate chapters ==
In the following list of collegiate chapters, active chapters and colonies are indicated in bold, while inactive chapters are in italics.

Chapter	Charter date and rage	Institution	Location	Status	Ref.
Alpha	1989–202x ?	University at Albany, SUNY	Albany, New York	Inactive	
**Beta**	1991	State University of New York at New Paltz	New Paltz, New York	Active	
**Beta**	1991	Marist College	Poughkeepsie, New York	Active	
Gamma	1991–202x ?	Union College	Schenectady, New York	Inactive	
**Delta**	1992	State University of New York at Binghamton	Binghamton, New York	Active	
**Epsilon**	1993	LIU Post	Brookville, New York	Active	
Zeta	1993–202x ?	State University of New York at Oswego	Oswego, New York	Inactive	
**Eta**	1994	State University of New York Brockport	Brockport, New York	Active	
**Eta**	1994	Rochester Institute of Technology	Henrietta, New York	Active	
**Eta**	1994	University of Rochester	Rochester, New York	Active	
**Theta**	1999	Stony Brook University	Stony Brook, New York	Active	
**Iota**	1999	University of Virginia	Charlottesville, Virginia	Active	
Kappa	1999–20xx ?	Hofstra University	Hempstead, New York	Inactive	
Lambda	2000–20xx ?	Brooklyn College	Brooklyn, New York City	Inactive	
**Mu**	2000	University at Buffalo	Buffalo, New York	Active	
**Mu**	2000	Buffalo State University	Buffalo, New York	Active	
**Mu**	2000	D’Youville University	Buffalo, New York	Active	
Nu	2000–202x ?	Cornell University	Ithaca, New York	Inactive	
Nu	2000–202x ?	Ithaca College	Ithaca, New York	Inactive	
Xi	2000–202x ?	Syracuse University	Syracuse, New York	Inactive	
Xi	2000–202x ?	Le Moyne College	DeWitt, New York	Inactive	
Omicron	2001–20xx ?	Duke University	Durham, North Carolina	Inactive	
**Pi**	2002	Northeastern University	Boston, Massachusetts	Active	
Rho	2002–20xx ?	Michigan State University	East Lansing, Michigan	Inactive	
**Sigma**	2003	State University of New York at Plattsburgh	Plattsburgh, New York	Active	
Tau	2003–202x ?	Utica College	Utica, New York	Inactive	
Tau	2003–202x ?	Hamilton College	Clinton, New York	Inactive	
Upsilon	2003–202x ?	Rutgers University–New Brunswick	New Brunswick, New Jersey	Inactive	
Phi	2003	University of Southern California	Los Angeles, California	Active	
Chi	2003–20xx ?	Seton Hall University	South Orange, New Jersey	Inactive	
**Psi**	2006	DePauw University	Greencastle, Indiana	Active	
Omega				Unassigned	
Beta Alpha	2006–202x ?	St. John's University	Jamaica, Queens, New York City	Inactive	
Beta Beta	2006–2010	University of Illinois at Urbana-Champaign	Champaign, Illinois	Inactive	
**Beta Gamma**	2007	New York University	New York City	Active	
**Beta Delta**	2008	Pace University	Pleasantville, New York	Active	
Beta Epsilon	2008–201x ?	State University of New York at Old Westbury	Old Westbury, New York	Inactive	
**Beta Zeta**	2010	Florida State University	Tallahassee, Florida	Active	
**Beta Eta**	2010	University of South Florida	Tampa, Florida	Active	
**Beta Theta**	2009	State University of New York at Cortland	Cortland, New York	Active	
Beta Iota	2010–202x ?	Northeastern Illinois University	Chicago, Illinois	Inactive	
Beta Kappa	2010–202x ?	University of New Haven	New Haven, Connecticut	Inactive	
**Beta Lambda**	2011	University of North Carolina at Chapel Hill	Chapel Hill, North Carolina	Active	
Beta Mu	2011–202x ?	University of California, Berkeley	Berkeley, California	Inactive	
**Beta Nu**	2012	Johnson & Wales University	Providence, Rhode Island	Active	
Beta Xi	2003–202x ?	Rhode Island College	Providence, Rhode Island	Inactive	
Beta Omicron	2011–202x ?	Purdue University	West Lafayette, Indiana	Inactive	
Beta Pi	2014–202x ?	Yale University	New Haven, Connecticut	Inactive	
Beta Rho	2010–202x ?	Ramapo College	Mahwah, New Jersey	Inactive	
Beta Sigma	2015–202x ?	Florida International University	Miami, Florida	Inactive	
**Beta Tau**	2015	Indiana University	Bloomington, Indiana	Active	
**Beta Upsilon**	2016	Stevens Institute of Technology	Hoboken, New Jersey	Active	
**Beta Phi**	2016	State University of New York at Oneonta	Oneonta, New York	Active	
**Beta Chi**	2014	University of North Carolina at Charlotte	Charlotte, North Carolina	Active	
Beta Psi	2015–202x ?	Old Dominion University	Norfolk, Virginia	Inactive	
**Beta Omega**	2016	Georgia State University	Atlanta, Georgia	Active	
**Gamma Alpha**	2016	Illinois State University	Normal, Illinois	Active	
**Gamma Beta**	2018	Rutgers University–Newark	Newark, New Jersey	Active	
Gamma Gamma	2008–202x ?	New York City	New York City, New York	Inactive	
Gamma Gamma	2008–202x ?	Columbia University	New York City, New York	Inactive	
Gamma Gamma	2008–202x ?	Pace University	New York City, New York	Inactive	
Gamma Gamma	2008–202x ?	City College of New York	New York City, New York	Inactive	
Gamma Gamma	2008–202x ?	John Jay College of Criminal Justice	New York City, New York	Inactive	
Gamma Gamma	2008–202x ?	Barnard College	Manhattan, New York City	Inactive	
Collective at RPI		Rensselaer Polytechnic Institute	Troy, New York	Active	(Note: Colony formed in 2021.)
Collective at Rowan University		Rowan University	Glassboro, New Jersey	Active	
Collective at Chapman University		Chapman University	Orange, California	Active	(Note: Collective formed in 2023.)

== Alumnae chapters ==
In the following list of alumnae chapters, active chapters are indicated in bold and inactive chapters are in italics.

Chapter	Charter date and range	Location	Status	Ref.
Alpha Alpha			Unassigned	
**Alpha Beta**	1994	New York City, New York	Active	
**Alpha Gamma**	2004	Washington, D.C.	Active	
**Alpha Delta**	2004	Rochester, New York	Active	
**Alpha Epsilon**	2007	Boston, Massachusetts	Active	
**Alpha Zeta**	2007	Northern New Jersey	Active	
Alpha Eta	2007	Buffalo, New York	Inactive	
Alpha Theta	2007	Orlando, Florida	Inactive	
Alpha Iota	2011	Chicago, Illinois	Inactive	
**Alpha Kappa**	2013	New Haven, Connecticut	Active	
**Alpha Lambda**	2016	Raleigh, Durham, and Chapel Hill, North Carolina	Active	
**Alpha Mu**	2011	Los Angeles, California	Active	
**Alpha Nu**	2017	Long Island, New York	Active	
**Alpha Xi**	2018	Westchester County, New York	Active	
**Alpha Omicron**	2016	Atlanta, Georgia	Active	
**Alpha Pi**	2019	Middletown, New York	Active	
**South Florida Alumnae Collective**	2015	Miami, Florida	Active	
**South Jersey Alumnae Collective**	2019	South Jersey	Active	
**Charlotte Alumnae Collective**	2020	Charlotte, North Carolina	Active	
**Texas Alumnae Collective**	2021	Texas statewide	Active	
