= Otter Pond (Fine, St. Lawrence County, New York) =

- Location within New York Otter Pond (the United States)
- Location: St. Lawrence County, New York, United States
- Coordinates: 44°06′19″N 74°59′17″W
- Type: Lake
- Basin countries: United States
- Surface area: 43 acres (0.17 km^{2})
- Average depth: 4 feet (1.2 m)
- Max. depth: 15 feet (4.6 m)
- Shore length^{1}: 1.6 miles (2.6 km)
- Surface elevation: 1,591 feet (485 m)
- Islands: 1
- Settlements: Star Lake, New York
- ^{1} Shore length is not a well-defined measure.

Otter Pond is located southeast of Star Lake, New York. Fish species present in the lake are white sucker, brown bullhead, and yellow perch. Access via Bushwhack Trail from Old Hay Road along Otter Creek. No motors are allowed on Otter Pond.
