= Fine, New York =

- Town
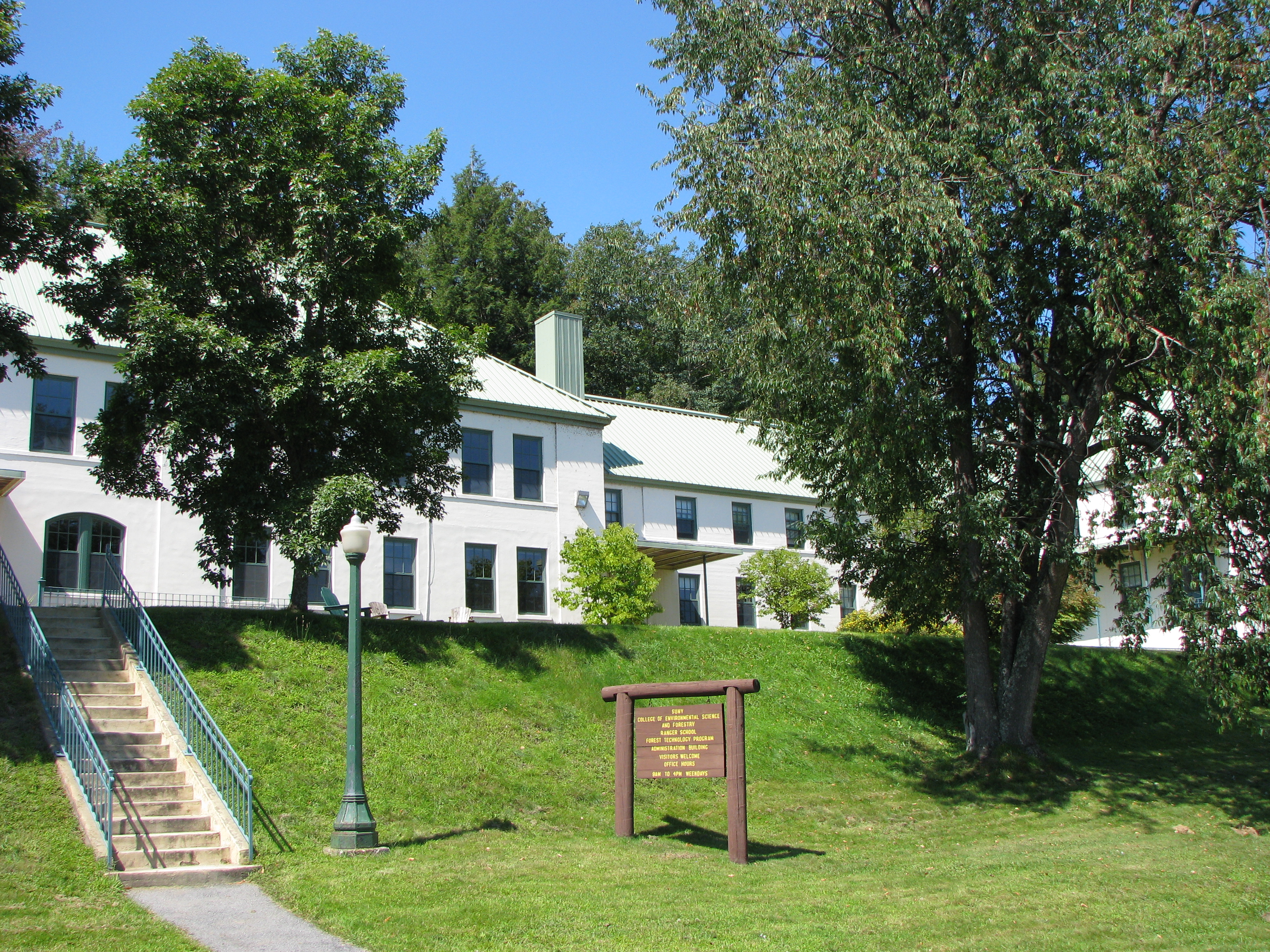
- SUNY-ESF Ranger School at Wanakena

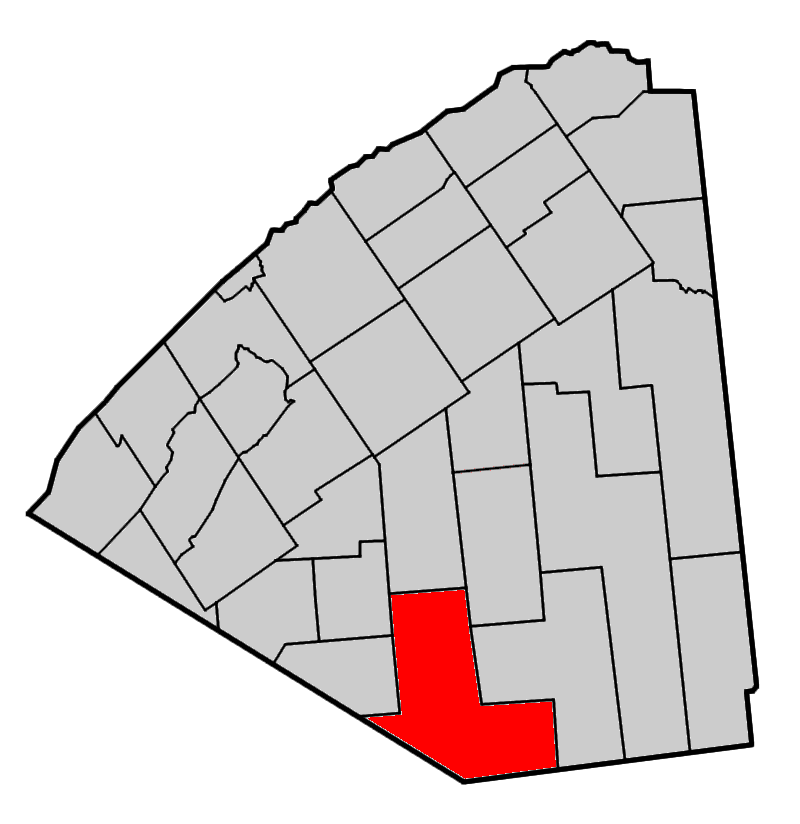
- Map highlighting Fine's location within St. Lawrence County.

- Location within the state of New York
- Coordinates: 44°12′36″N 75°5′25″W
- Country: United States
- State: New York
- County: St. Lawrence

Area
  - Total: 169.42 sq mi (438.79 km^{2})
  - Land: 166.65 sq mi (431.61 km^{2})
  - Water: 2.77 sq mi (7.18 km^{2})
- Elevation: 1,549 ft (472 m)

Population (2020)
  - Total: 1,304
  - Density: 8.8/sq mi (3.41/km^{2})
- Time zone: UTC-5 (Eastern (EST))
  - Summer (DST): UTC-4 (EDT)
- FIPS code: 36-25791
- GNIS feature ID: 0978957
- Website: https://finetownny.gov/

Fine is a town in St. Lawrence County, New York, United States. The population was 1,512 at the 2010 census. The town is named after Judge John Fine, a businessman involved in settling the town.

The Town of Fine is in the southern part of the county, south of Canton.

The SUNY-ESF Ranger School is in the eastern part of the town, and the Griffin Memorial Forest is also located in the town.

== History ==
The first settlement was begun by Elias Teall, who made a contract on October 24, 1823, with the proprietors of the east half of Scriba, and undertook to secure settlers on the tract. He built a mill on the east branch of the Oswegatchie and made some small improvements; but his undertaking failed. September 6, 1828, James C. Haile made a contract with the proprietors, and built a sawmill and a small grist mill on the Oswegatchie; he induced other settlers to come. In May 1833, he also left the town, his settlers having abandoned him. In February 1834, Arnasa I. Brown contracted with the owners for the Haile improvements and an additional tract of land, and in March of that year moved his family in; his nearest neighbors were ten miles away. A few others joined him, and by 1843 there were 43 or 44 voters.

The little hamlet of Fine is on the east branch of the Oswegatchie River about five miles southeast of South Edwards. It has been locally known as "Smithville" from William P. Smith, who was an early resident there.

The town was organized in 1849 from parts of the Towns of Pierrepont and Russell.

The Fine Town Hall was listed on the National Register of Historic Places in 1996.

== Geography ==
According to the United States Census Bureau, the town has a total area of 169.4 square miles (439 km^{2}), of which 167.1 square miles (433 km^{2}) is land and 2.3 square miles (6.0 km^{2}) (1.36%) is water.

The town lies within the Adirondack Park.

The southern town line is the border of Lewis and Herkimer counties.

New York State Route 3, an east–west highway, crosses the town. New York State Route 58 intersects NY-3 near Fine village.

The east branch of the Oswegatchie River flows in a northwesterly direction from Cranberry Lake, through Fine.

== Demographics ==
Historical population
| Census | Pop. | Note | %± |
|---|---|---|---|
| 1850 | 293 | | — |
| 1860 | 519 | | 77.1% |
| 1870 | 603 | | 16.2% |
| 1880 | 893 | | 48.1% |
| 1890 | 1,207 | | 35.2% |
| 1900 | 1,694 | | 40.3% |
| 1910 | 2,234 | | 31.9% |
| 1920 | 1,459 | | −34.7% |
| 1930 | 1,053 | | −27.8% |
| 1940 | 1,208 | | 14.7% |
| 1950 | 1,875 | | 55.2% |
| 1960 | 2,391 | | 27.5% |
| 1970 | 2,302 | | −3.7% |
| 1980 | 2,243 | | −2.6% |
| 1990 | 1,813 | | −19.2% |
| 2000 | 1,622 | | −10.5% |
| 2010 | 1,512 | | −6.8% |
| 2020 | 1,304 | | −13.8% |

As of the census of 2000, there were 1,622 people, 667 households, and 452 families residing in the town. The population density was 9.7 inhabitants per square mile (3.7/km^{2}). There were 1,137 housing units at an average density of 6.8 per square mile (2.6/km^{2}). The racial makeup of the town was 97.29% White, 0.68% African American, 0.68% Native American, 0.37% Asian, 0.06% from other races, and 0.92% from two or more races. Hispanic or Latino of any race were 0.37% of the population.

There were 667 households, out of which 25.8% had children under the age of 18 living with them, 54.9% were married couples living together, 7.5% had a female householder with no husband present, and 32.2% were non-families. 27.1% of all households were made up of individuals, and 13.9% had someone living alone who was 65 years of age or older. The average household size was 2.36 and the average family size was 2.83.

In the town, the population was spread out, with 21.1% under the age of 18, 8.2% from 18 to 24, 26.0% from 25 to 44, 27.7% from 45 to 64, and 17.0% who were 65 years of age or older. The median age was 42 years. For every 100 females, there were 97.8 males. For every 100 females age 18 and over, there were 100.0 males.

The median income for a household in the town was $32,112, and the median income for a family was $38,618. Males had a median income of $38,043 versus $20,875 for females. The per capita income for the town was $16,744. About 13.7% of families and 17.3% of the population were below the poverty line, including 24.1% of those under age 18 and 10.8% of those age 65 or over.

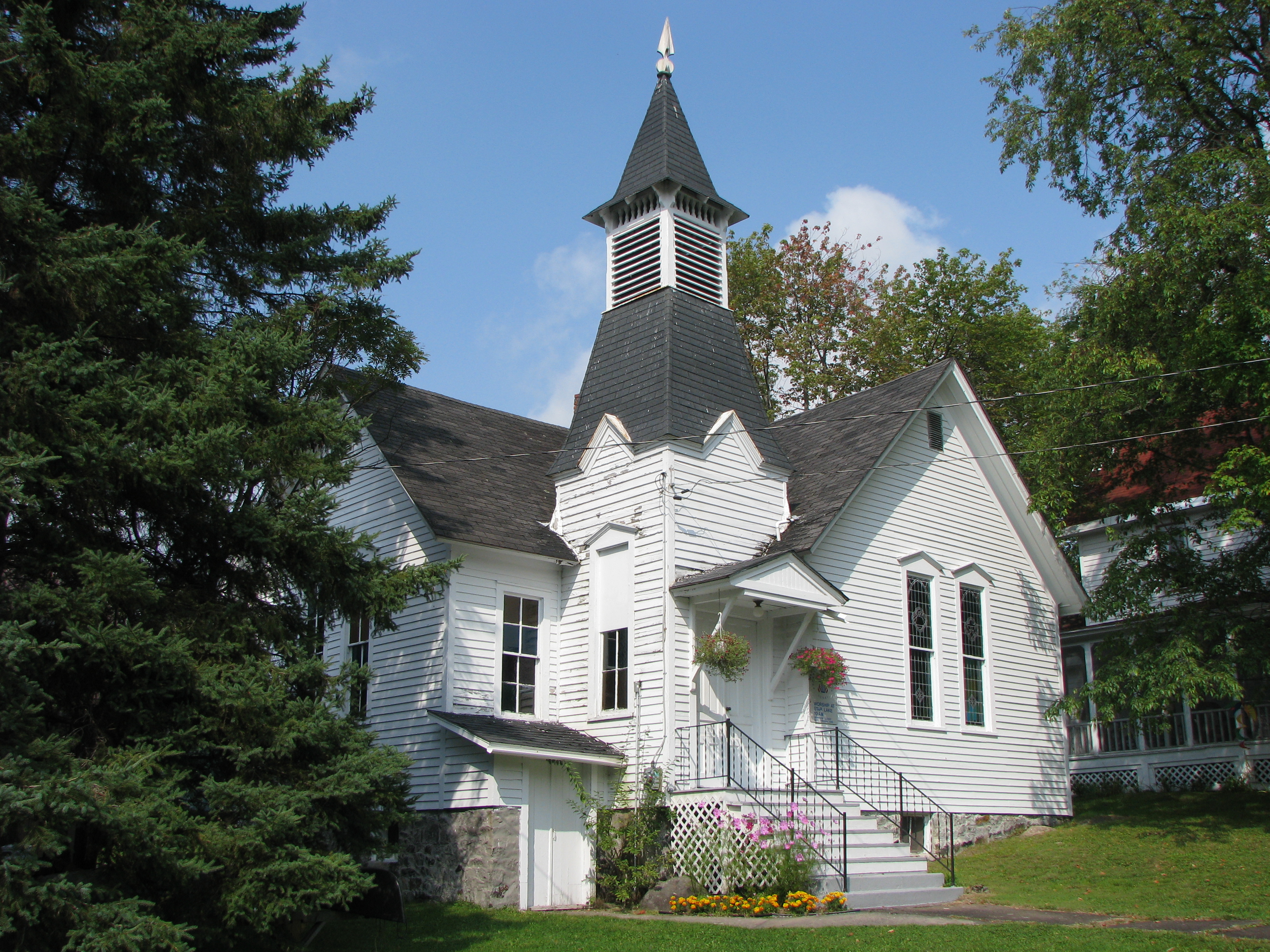
Western Adirondack Presbyterian Church in Wanakena

== Communities and locations in Fine ==
- Aldrich – A hamlet south of Coffin Mills.
- Briggs – A hamlet near the western town line, west of Coffin Mills.
- Coffins Mills – A hamlet southwest of Oswegatchie village.
- Fine – The hamlet of Fine is in the northern part of the town by the east branch of the Oswegatchie River. It was originally known as "Smithville","Andersonville" and Sarahsburg from an early resident.
- Flat Rock Reservoir – A reservoir located north of Lower Oswegatchie.
- Inlet – A location west of Wanakena.
- Jayville – A hamlet at the western town line, west of Briggs.
- Long Lake – A lake located on the southern town line. Located east of Round Lake.
- Lower Oswegatchie – A hamlet on NY-3, located in the eastern part of the town and north of Oswegatchie village.
- Oswegatchie – A hamlet on NY-3, located in eastern part of the town. This settlement grew to importance as a railroad community.
- Otter Pond – A lake located southeast of Star Lake.
- Round Lake – A lake located near the southern town line.
- Star Lake – A lake in the eastern part of the town.
- Star Lake – A hamlet located on the eastern town line and east of Star Lake on NY-3. Most of the community is in the Town of Clifton. Star Lake is also the location for the Clifton-Fine Central School District.
- Streeter Lake – A small lake located southeast of Star Lake.
- Sucker Lake – A lake located east of Coffins Mills.
- Wanakena – A hamlet located on County Road 61 on an arm of Cranberry Lake in the southeastern part of the town. It is the location of the SUNY-ESF Ranger School.
