= Olmstead Pond =

- Location within New York Olmstead Pond (the United States)
- Location: St. Lawrence County, New York, United States
- Coordinates: 44°07′17″N 74°50′36″W
- Type: Lake
- Basin countries: United States
- Surface area: 54 acres (0.22 km^{2})
- Average depth: 10 feet (3.0 m)
- Max. depth: 21 feet (6.4 m)
- Shore length^{1}: 2 miles (3.2 km)
- Surface elevation: 1,690 feet (520 m)
- Islands: 1
- Settlements: Wanakena, New York
- ^{1} Shore length is not a well-defined measure.

Olmstead Pond is a lake located northeast of Wanakena, New York. The outflow creek flows into Six Mile Creek. Fish species present in the pond are brown bullhead, and brook trout. Access via trail from West Flow Bay of Cranberry Lake on the south shore. No motors are allowed on Olmstead Pond.
