= Flat Rock Reservoir =

Lake in New York, United States

- Location within New York Location within the United States
- Location: St. Lawrence County, New York, United States
- Coordinates: 44°13′17.7″N 75°04′24.4″W
- Basin countries: United States
- Surface area: 194 acres (0.79 km^{2})
- Max. depth: 52 feet (16 m)
- Shore length^{1}: 6.8 mi (10.9 km)
- Surface elevation: 1,060 ft (320 m)
- Islands: 1
- Settlements: Lower Oswegatchie
- ^{1} Shore length is not a well-defined measure.

Flat Rock Reservoir is located by Lower Oswegatchie, in St. Lawrence County, New York. Fish species present in the lake are largemouth bass, smallmouth bass, walleye, landlocked salmon, brown trout, white sucker, sunfish, rock bass, yellow perch, and black bullhead. There is a hard surface ramp launch access on county route 3.
