= Streeter Lake =

Lake in New York, United States

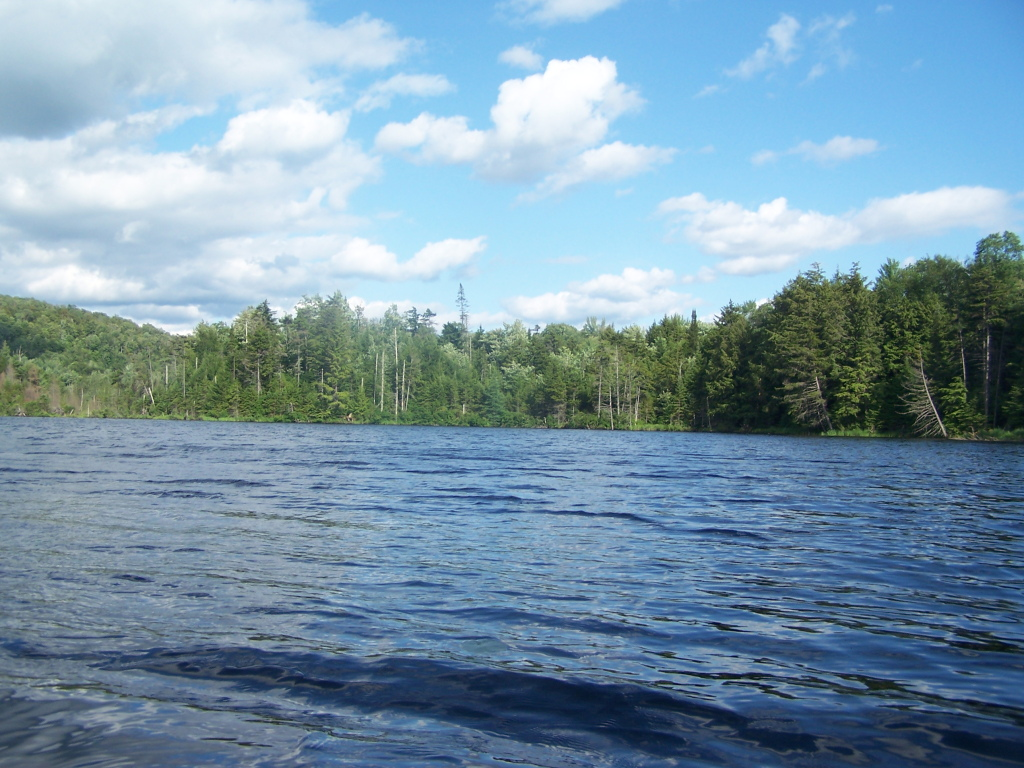
- Streeter Lake in 2011

- Location within New York Streeter Lake (the United States)
- Location: St. Lawrence County, New York, United States
- Coordinates: 44°06′27″N 75°04′18″W
- Basin countries: United States
- Surface area: 70 acres (0.28 km^{2})
- Average depth: 8 feet (2.4 m)
- Max. depth: 17 feet (5.2 m)
- Shore length^{1}: 1.6 miles (2.6 km)
- Surface elevation: 1,486 feet (453 m)
- Settlements: Star Lake, New York
- ^{1} Shore length is not a well-defined measure.

Streeter Lake is located south of Star Lake, New York. Fish species present in the lake are white sucker, brown trout, brook trout, and black bullhead. There is a carry down launch off Coffin Mills Road on the east and west shore.
