= Star Lake (New York) =

- Location within New York Star Lake (the United States)
- Location: St. Lawrence County, New York, United States
- Coordinates: 44°09′26″N 75°02′43″W
- Type: Lake
- Basin countries: United States
- Surface area: 215 acres (0.87 km^{2})
- Average depth: 21 feet (6.4 m)
- Max. depth: 65 feet (20 m)
- Shore length^{1}: 5.8 miles (9.3 km)
- Surface elevation: 1,447 feet (441 m)
- Islands: 4
- Settlements: Star Lake, New York
- ^{1} Shore length is not a well-defined measure.

Star Lake is located by Star Lake, New York. Fish species present in the lake are largemouth bass, smallmouth bass, rainbow trout, landlocked salmon, brown trout, white sucker, sunfish, rock bass, yellow perch, and black bullhead. There is carry-down launch access with permission from the Town of Fine, on route 3.
