= Brown's Falls Reservoir =

- Location within New York Location within the United States
- Location: St. Lawrence County, New York, United States
- Coordinates: 44°12′32″N 75°01′45″W
- Type: Reservoir
- Primary inflows: Oswegatchie River
- Primary outflows: Oswegatchie River
- Basin countries: United States
- Surface area: 136 acres (0.55 km^{2})
- Average depth: 21 feet (6.4 m)
- Max. depth: 66 feet (20 m)
- Shore length^{1}: 4.3 miles (6.9 km)
- Surface elevation: 1,345 feet (410 m)
- Islands: 1
- Settlements: Newton Falls, New York
- ^{1} Shore length is not a well-defined measure.

Brown's Falls Reservoir is a man-made lake located by Newton Falls, New York. Fish species present in the reservoir are smallmouth bass, northern pike, brown bullhead, white sucker, rock bass, yellow perch, and walleye. You can only access the lake with permission from Reliant Energy.
