= Round Lake (Michigan) =

Round Lake is the name of several lakes in the U.S. state of Michigan:

List of Round Lakes
Name	GNIS ID	County (Note: Note on lakes that span more than one county: The county column only shows the first county returned by GNIS in this column.)	Coord	Elevation (ft)	Elevation (m)
Chittenden Lake	1619498	Manistee	44°13′14″N 85°56′33″W	771	235
Clifford Lake	623464	Livingston	42°32′21″N 83°50′58″W	942	287
Cusino Lake	624245	Schoolcraft	46°27′16″N 86°15′34″W	876	267
Dream Lake	1619762	Gogebic	46°12′22″N 89°22′32″W	1,686	514
Ess Lake	636445	Montmorency	45°6′45″N 83°58′56″W	817	249
Ke-wag-a-wan Lake	629486	Kent	43°12′21″N 85°39′46″W	774	236
Lake Skegemog	638052	Kalkaska	44°48′39″N 85°19′34″W	587	179
Larks Lake	630167	Emmet	45°36′17″N 84°55′48″W	728	222
Little Round Lake	630754	Alger	46°15′43″N 86°47′5″W	846	258
Loon Lake	631051	Benzie	44°42′34″N 86°7′49″W	584	178
Mahskeekee Lake	631336	Alger and Delta	46°1′14″N 86°37′15″W	751	229
Marten Lake	1620722	Iron	46°23′36″N 88°41′42″W	1,532	467
McFall Lake	1620759	Lake	44°3′13″N 85°59′15″W	748	228
North Manistique Lake	633607	Luce	46°17′14″N 85°44′14″W	712	217
Reid Lake	635783	Alcona	44°38′33″N 83°41′5″W	909	277
Round Lake	636303	Missaukee	44°18′53″N 85°20′6″W	1,257	383
Round Lake	636277	Branch	42°2′58″N 85°1′1″W	928	283
Round Lake	636312	Emmet	45°24′25″N 84°53′29″W	597	182
Round Lake	636319	Lenawee	41°54′34″N 84°21′10″W	965	294
Round Lake	636292	Oakland	42°49′15″N 83°8′20″W	942	287
Round Lake	636300	Osceola	43°57′57″N 85°23′3″W	1,204	367
Round Lake	636302	Roscommon	44°12′53″N 84°31′37″W	1,286	392
Round Lake	636282	Van Buren	42°17′22″N 85°56′9″W	686	209
Round Lake	636324	Kent	43°3′45″N 85°22′41″W	837	255
Round Lake	636276	Hillsdale	41°53′48″N 84°46′8″W	1,050	320
Round Lake	636307	Benzie	44°41′35″N 86°11′6″W	604	184
Round Lake	636314	Dickinson	46°12′42″N 88°4′29″W	1,381	421
Round Lake	636318	Luce	46°39′58″N 85°23′19″W	666	203
Round Lake	636320	Lenawee	41°58′0″N 84°16′32″W	1,040	320
Round Lake	636275	Cass	41°51′9″N 85°53′30″W	833	254
Round Lake	636308	Otsego	44°52′35″N 84°25′22″W	1,207	368
Round Lake	636283	Allegan	42°33′4″N 86°0′46″W	650	200
Round Lake	636278	Cass	42°3′57″N 86°5′47″W	755	230
Round Lake	636285	Oakland	42°37′9″N 83°28′18″W	935	285
Round Lake	636289	Oakland	42°45′27″N 83°16′50″W	984	300
Round Lake	636322	Livingston	42°37′41″N 83°44′26″W	955	291
Round Lake	636281	Jackson	42°13′12″N 84°19′40″W	938	286
Round Lake	1621446	Mason	44°0′29″N 86°6′52″W	699	213
Round Lake	636291	Shiawassee	42°49′8″N 84°3′12″W	846	258
Round Lake	636305	Grand Traverse	44°34′55″N 85°47′44″W	837	255
Round Lake	636317	Baraga	46°37′16″N 88°15′44″W	1,729	527
Round Lake	636299	Clare	43°53′48″N 84°38′33″W	804	245
Round Lake	636323	Clinton	42°52′40″N 84°26′43″W	801	244
Round Lake	636295	Ottawa	42°57′32″N 85°47′6″W	679	207
Round Lake	636280	Jackson	42°5′18″N 84°28′21″W	1,040	320
Round Lake	636286	Allegan	42°40′23″N 85°34′3″W	801	244
Round Lake	636301	Gladwin	44°5′10″N 84°29′6″W	866	264
Round Lake	636306	Grand Traverse	44°40′1″N 85°48′11″W	830	250
Round Lake	636284	Allegan	42°36′55″N 85°33′56″W	758	231
Round Lake	636293	Oakland	42°50′59″N 83°36′47″W	909	277
Round Lake	636313	Charlevoix	45°42′56″N 85°31′52″W	646	197
Round Lake	636321	Lenawee	42°4′17″N 84°7′55″W	965	294
Round Lake	636316	Marquette	46°33′25″N 87°56′53″W	1,591	485
Round Lake	636294	Lapeer	42°53′57″N 83°23′4″W	1,043	318
Round Lake	636290	Oakland	42°46′57″N 83°21′34″W	1,040	320
Round Lake	636304	Iosco	44°20′22″N 83°39′38″W	781	238
Round Lake	636279	Van Buren	42°4′50″N 86°12′38″W	764	233
Round Lake	1621448	Mackinac	45°57′40″N 84°52′14″W	617	188
Round Lake	1621449	Mackinac	46°6′18″N 84°30′10″W	801	244
Round Lake	636315	Marquette	46°19′22″N 87°51′53″W	1,460	450
Round Lake	636326	Mecosta	43°37′16″N 85°18′32″W	958	292
Round Lake	636274	Branch	41°46′49″N 85°17′2″W	902	275
Round Lake	636287	Eaton	42°40′26″N 85°0′54″W	833	254
Round Lake	636309	Otsego	44°58′15″N 84°39′57″W	1,276	389
Round Lake	636311	Charlevoix	45°19′0″N 85°15′16″W	581	177
Round Lake	1621445	Oceana	43°31′8″N 86°21′14″W	692	211
Round Lake	1621450	Delta	46°9′3″N 86°44′38″W	781	238
Round Lake	636310	Otsego	45°8′7″N 84°27′15″W	945	288
Round Lake	636298	Mecosta	43°44′13″N 85°26′35″W	994	303
Round Lake	1618939	Berrien	41°50′14″N 86°25′7″W	725	221
Round Lake	636288	Allegan	42°44′43″N 85°35′32″W	787	240
Round Lake	636297	Isabella	43°41′50″N 85°4′48″W	919	280
Round Lake	636296	Newaygo	43°34′19″N 85°35′38″W	1,007	307
Round Lake	1621447	Muskegon	43°25′35″N 86°7′38″W	712	217
Timber Lake	1614867	Kalkaska	44°49′43″N 84°59′31″W	1,207	368
Tomassi Lake	1614942	Gogebic	46°15′9″N 89°3′24″W	1,654	504
Utley Lake	1622008	Newaygo	43°28′14″N 85°44′40″W	774	236
Ware Lake	636325	Kent	43°17′36″N 85°30′5″W	886	270
Wildwood Lake	1616467	Iron	46°5′54″N 88°33′50″W	1,608	490
Wyckoff Lake	1616856	Oceana	43°42′18″N 86°25′34″W	666	203
Zeek Lake	1622228	Oceana	43°34′23″N 86°17′14″W	781	238
