= Fine Town Hall =

- U.S. National Register of Historic Places
- Location within New York Location within the United States
- Location: 91 NY 58, Fine, New York
- Coordinates: 44°14′51″N 75°8′21″W
- Area: less than one acre
- Built: 1884
- Architectural style: Late Victorian
- NRHP reference No.: 96000829
- Added to NRHP: August 1, 1996

Fine Town Hall is a historic town hall building located at Fine in St. Lawrence County, New York. It was built about 1884 and is a two-story, rectangular shaped frame building with a corrugated metal roof and stone foundation, 35 feet wide and 75 feet long.

It was listed on the National Register of Historic Places in 1996.
