= Eden Prairie, Minnesota =

City in Minnesota, United States

- City
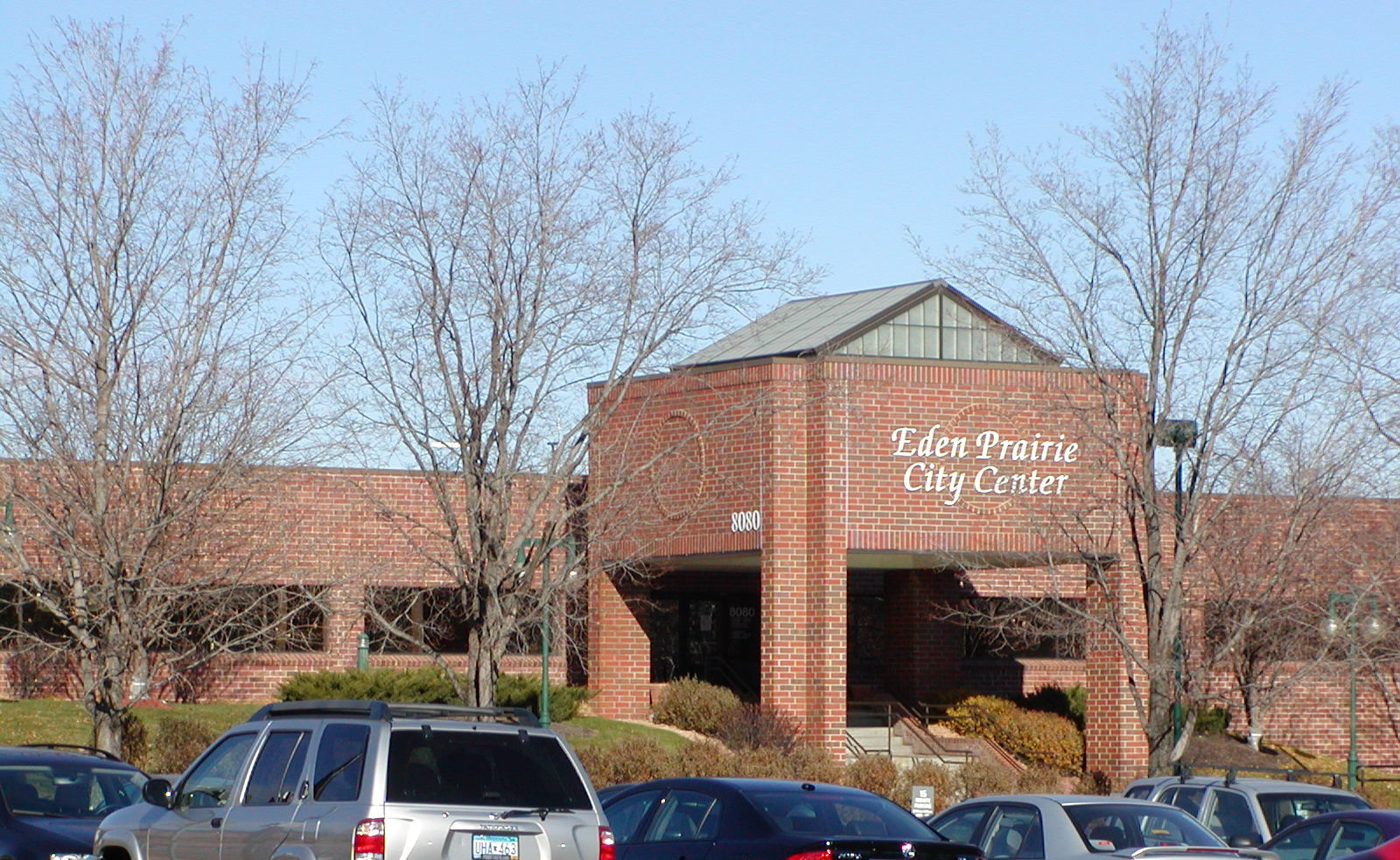
- Eden Prairie City Center

- Logo
- Nickname: EP
- Motto: Live, Work, Dream
- Location of Eden Prairie within Hennepin County, Minnesota

- Location in Minnesota Location in the United States
- Coordinates: 44°51′17″N 93°28′15″W
- Country: United States
- State: Minnesota
- County: Hennepin
- Founded: 1858
- Incorporated: October 22, 1962
- Founded by: Robert Anderson

Government
  - Mayor: Ron Case (DFL)

Area
  - City: 35.22 sq mi (91.22 km^{2})
  - Land: 32.50 sq mi (84.17 km^{2})
  - Water: 2.72 sq mi (7.05 km^{2})
- Elevation: 890 ft (270 m)

Population (2020)
  - City: 64,198
  - Estimate (2022): 62,476
  - Rank: US: 620th MN: 16th
  - Density: 1,975.5/sq mi (762.76/km^{2})
  - Urban: 2,650,890 (US: 16th)
  - Metro: 3,693,729 (US: 16th)
- Time zone: UTC-6 (Central (CST))
  - Summer (DST): UTC-5 (CDT)
- ZIP codes: 55344, 55346, 55347
- Area code: 952
- FIPS code: 27-18116
- GNIS feature ID: 643164
- Website: edenprairiemn.gov

Eden Prairie is a city in Hennepin County, Minnesota, United States. It had a population of 64,198 at the 2020 census, making it the 16th-largest city in the state. The city is adjacent to the north bank of the Minnesota River, upstream from its confluence with the Mississippi River, about 12 miles (19 km) southwest of downtown Minneapolis.

Set in the Twin Cities' second ring suburbs, the community was designed as a mixed-income city model and is home to numerous commercial firms, including the headquarters of SuperValu, C.H. Robinson Worldwide, Winnebago Industries, Starkey Hearing Technologies, Lifetouch Inc., SABIS, and MTS Systems Corporation. It contains the Eden Prairie Center mall and is the hub of SouthWest Transit, providing public transportation to three adjacent suburbs. The television stations KMSP and WFTC are based in Eden Prairie. The nonprofit news organization Eden Prairie Local News (EPLN) also serves the community.

The area features numerous municipal and regional parks, conservation areas, multi-purpose trails, and recreational facilities. There are more than 170 miles (270 km) of multi-use trails, 2,250 acres (9 km^{2}) of parks, and 1,300 acres (5 km^{2}) of open space. Popular recreational areas include Staring Lake, Lake Riley, Purgatory Creek, Miller Park, Round Lake, and the Minnesota River Bluffs Regional Trail.

== History ==
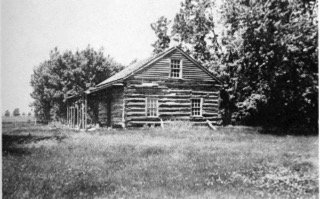
Cummins Cabin, pre-1860

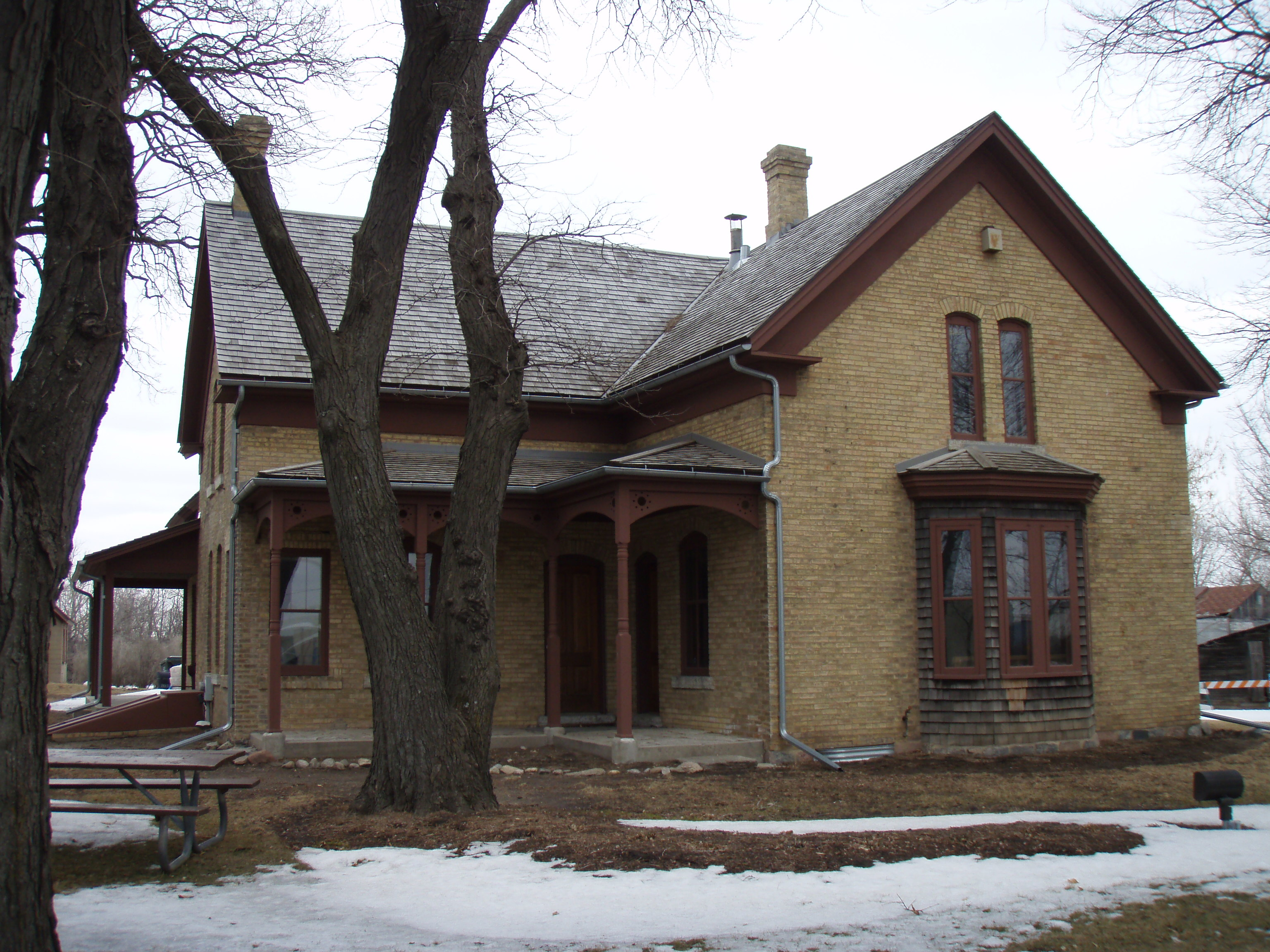
Current photo of the Cummins-Phipps-Grill House

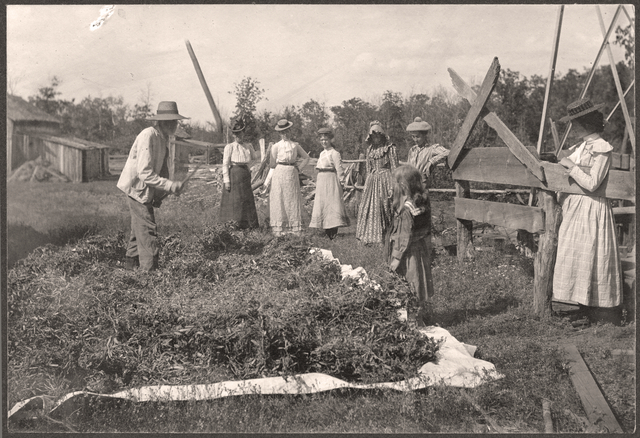
Flailing out beans at Cummins Farm

Native Americans were the first to live in the area. Originally, the land was part of the Great Dakota Nation, but when the Ojibwe arrived from the Great Lakes region, the tribes began to clash over the land. The Ojibwe were armed with knives and guns traded to them by white settlers and fur traders, and after years of bloody warfare the Ojibwe had forced the Dakota to give up all their land east of the Mississippi River, and north of the Crow Wing River, land that did not include what is now Eden Prairie.

On May 25, 1858, a battle was fought between the Dakota and the Ojibwe in the southern part of Eden Prairie, just north of the Minnesota River, an area known as Murphy's Ferry. The Ojibwe wished to "avenge the murder" of one of their people by the Dakota the previous fall. The Ojibwe had 200 warriors and the Dakota somewhere between 60 and 70, but the Dakota proved victorious, wounding the young Ojibwe chief. The tribes continued to fight over territory well into the 1860s, even after the "Sioux Uprising" of 1862, when most Dakota people were removed from Minnesota.

Among the notable Native Americans who lived in the Eden Prairie area was Chief Shoto. Born into the band of Chief Wabash, he went on to be the chief of the Red Wing Dakota tribe for 15 years, leaving them and becoming Chief of the "Little Six" band of Dakota until the uprising in 1862, during which he became a scout for then Governor Sibley from 1862 to 1870, returning to the Little Six band in 1872. He died in 1899 at age 99 at his home in Eden Prairie.

In 1851, a treaty opened land west of the Mississippi River to settlement allowing pioneers to settle in what is now Eden Prairie. Many early farmhouses remain in the town and can be found on the National Register of Historic Places. One of these early settlers was John Cummins, an Irish-born immigrant who built what is now known as the "Cummins-Phipps-Grill House" with his wife Mattie in 1880. Manuscripts indicate that Cummins was an avid and respected horticulturist, scientist, and farmer; he used his farmland to experiment with different strains of apples and grapes to try to find one that could withstand the harsh climate in Minnesota. The Cummins family sold this property to the Phipps family in 1908.

In 1853, John H. McKenzie and Minnesota Territory secretary Alexander Wilkins platted the town of Hennepin along the Minnesota River in what is now southeastern Eden Prairie. According to area historian Helen Holden Anderson, topographic disadvantages for the transport of agricultural goods caused Hennepin to be eclipsed by other towns in the region and the town soon vanished from maps.

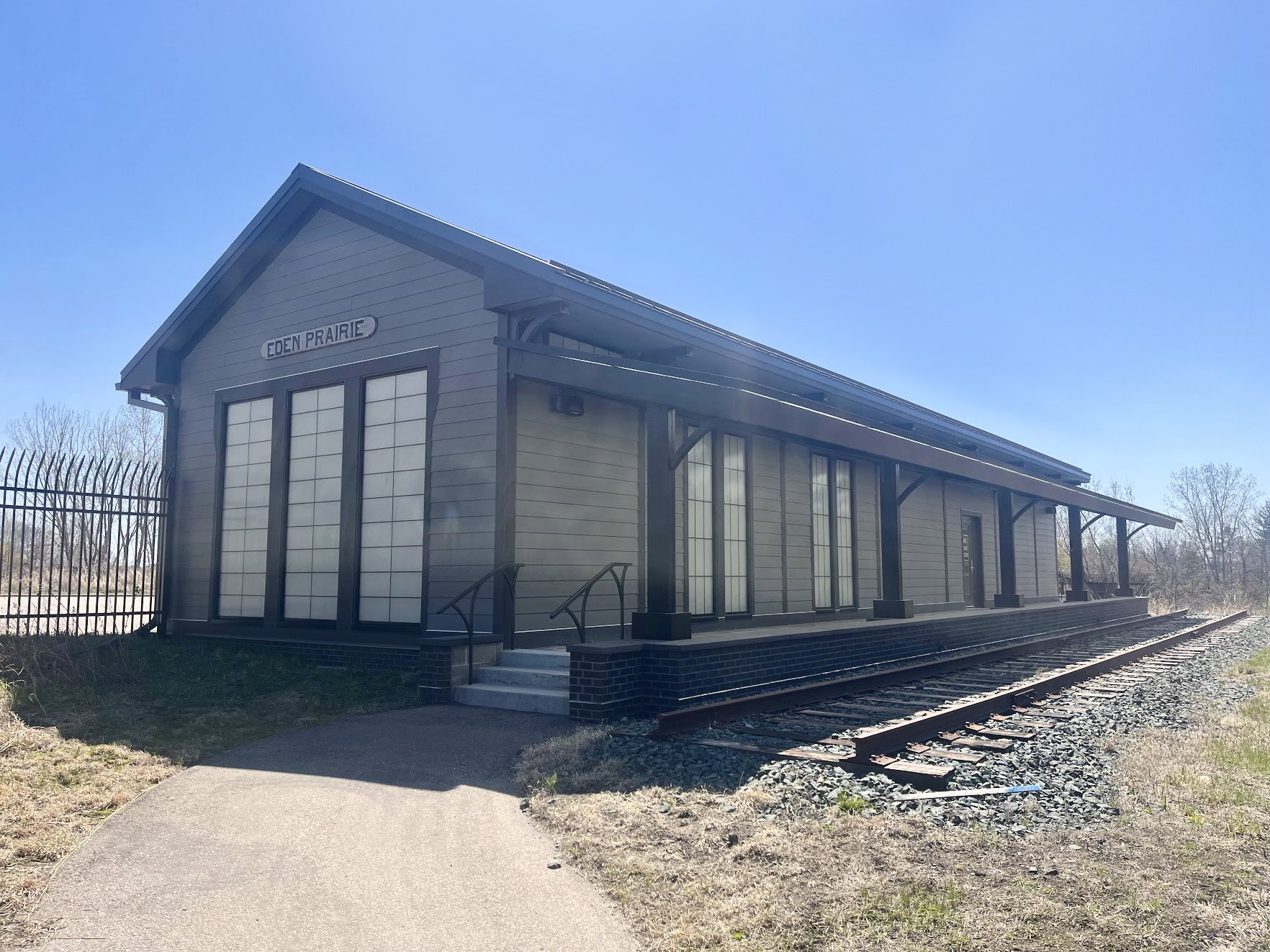
Reconstructed Minneapolis-St. Louis railway depot

The city was originally named "Eden" in 1853 by the writer Elizabeth F. Ellet, who chose the name because of her admiration of the "beautiful prairie" that occupies the southern part of town. Eden Prairie's town board held its first meeting in a log schoolhouse on May 11, 1858, the same day Minnesota became a state. In the 1870s, a post office called Washburn was established in Eden Prairie Township and would be discontinued in 1903. Also that decade, a depot along the Minneapolis-St. Louis Railroad was constructed near modern Eden Prairie Road and Highway 212. A replica on restricted land was built in 2022 beside the Minnesota River Bluffs LRT Regional Trail.

Eden Prairie's farming community grew slowly over the years. For most of its existence, Eden Prairie was a slow-growing, pastoral village on the far southwest fringes of the Twin Cities. Between 1880 and 1960, Eden Prairie's population only grew from about 739 to 2,000. Flying Cloud Airport was the first sign of big development in 1946. The 1960s and 1970s were decades of growth for the city's parks and recreation system. In the mid-1970s, the community gained a higher profile with the addition of Interstate Highway 494 and the Eden Prairie Center mall. Eden Prairie became a village in 1962 and a statutory city in 1974. One of Eden Prairie's popular lakes, Staring Lake, is named for Jonas Platt Staring (1809–1894), who built the first house by the lake.

== Geography ==
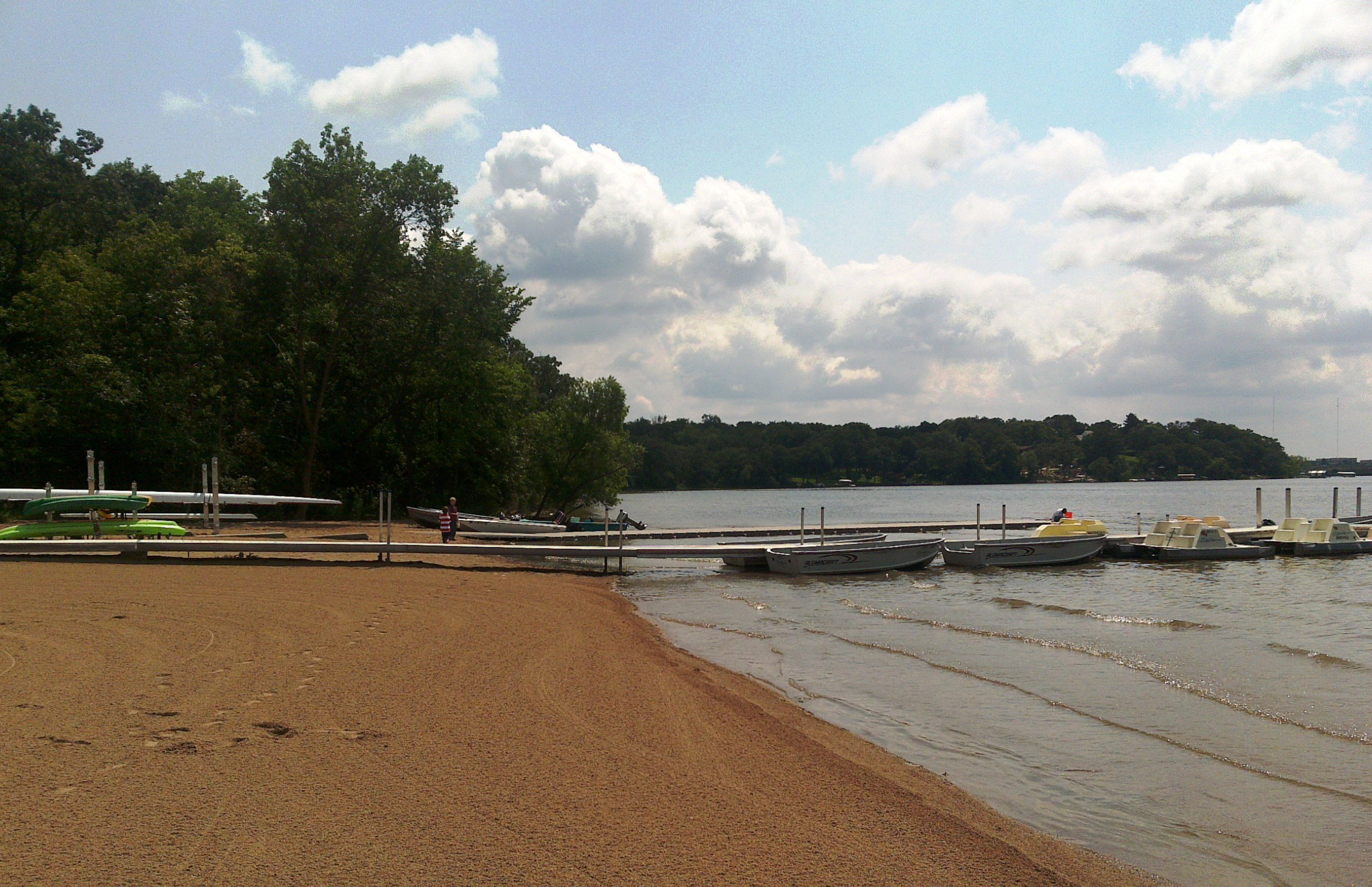
Bryant Lake, in Eden Prairie, originally named Bryant's Lake or one of many "Long Lake" lakes in Minnesota

Eden Prairie is about 11 miles (18 km) southwest of Minneapolis along the northern side of the Minnesota River.

Interstate 494, U.S. Highways 169 and 212, and Minnesota State Highway 5 are four of the city's main routes.

Eden Prairie's land consists of rolling hills and bluffs overlooking the Minnesota River, with zones of prairie and mixed (primarily deciduous) forests. Eden Prairie has parks such as Round Lake Park, Staring Lake Park and Bryant Lake Regional Park, with trails for running and biking.

According to the United States Census Bureau, the city has an area of 35.19 square miles (91.14 km^{2}), of which 32.45 square miles (84.05 km^{2}) is land and 2.74 square miles (7.10 km^{2}) is water.

== Demographics ==
Historical population
Census	Pop.	Note	%±
1860	304		—
1870	576		89.5%
1880	744		29.2%
1890	769		3.4%
1900	827		7.5%
1910	974		17.8%
1920	983		0.9%
1930	1,048		6.6%
1940	1,221		16.5%
1950	1,384		13.3%
1960	3,233		133.6%
1970	6,978		115.8%
1980	16,263		133.1%
1990	39,311		141.7%
2000	54,901		39.7%
2010	60,797		10.7%
2020	64,198		5.6%
2024 (est.)	62,905		−2.0%
U.S. Decennial Census; 2020 Census

=== 2020 census ===
As of the 2020 census, Eden Prairie had a population of 64,198. The median age was 39.2 years. 23.4% of residents were under the age of 18 and 15.0% of residents were 65 years of age or older. For every 100 females there were 95.7 males, and for every 100 females age 18 and over there were 93.4 males age 18 and over.

99.9% of residents lived in urban areas, while 0.1% lived in rural areas.

There were 24,892 households in Eden Prairie, of which 32.8% had children under the age of 18 living in them. Of all households, 58.4% were married-couple households, 14.0% were households with a male householder and no spouse or partner present, and 22.3% were households with a female householder and no spouse or partner present. About 23.7% of all households were made up of individuals and 8.9% had someone living alone who was 65 years of age or older.

There were 25,995 housing units, of which 4.2% were vacant. The homeowner vacancy rate was 0.5% and the rental vacancy rate was 7.8%.

Racial composition as of the 2020 census
Race	Number	Percent
White	45,194	70.4%
Black or African American	4,648	7.2%
American Indian and Alaska Native	205	0.3%
Asian	8,909	13.9%
Native Hawaiian and Other Pacific Islander	17	0.0%
Some other race	1,236	1.9%
Two or more races	3,989	6.2%
Hispanic or Latino (of any race)	2,970	4.6%

=== 2010 census ===
As of the census of 2010, there were 60,797 people, 23,930 households, and 16,517 families residing in the city. The population density was 1,873.6 inhabitants per square mile (723.4/km^{2}). There were 25,075 housing units at an average density of 772.7 per square mile (298.3/km^{2}). The racial makeup of the city was 81.7% White, 5.6% African American, 0.2% Native American, 9.2% Asian, 1.0% from other races, and 2.3% from two or more races. Hispanic or Latino residents of any race were 3.0% of the population.

There were 23,930 households, of which 36.3% had children under age 18 living with them, 58.2% were married couples living together, 8.0% had a female householder with no husband present, 2.8% had a male householder with no wife present, and 31.0% were non-families. 25.1% of all households were made up of individuals, and 6.1% had someone living alone who was 65 or older. The average household size was 2.53 and the average family size was 3.08.

The median age in the city was 37.6. 26.4% of residents were under 18; 6.5% were between 18 and 24; 27.6% were from 25 to 44; 30.8% were from 45 to 64; and 8.6% were 65 or older. The gender makeup of the city was 48.5% male and 51.5% female.

=== 2000 census ===
As of the census of 2000, there were 54,901 people, 20,457 households, and 14,579 families residing in the city. The population density was 1,695.1 inhabitants per square mile (654.5/km^{2}). There were 21,026 housing units at an average density of 649.2 per square mile (250.7/km^{2}). The racial makeup of the city was 90.7% White, 2.3% African American, 0.2% Native American, 4.8% Asian, 0.0% Pacific Islander, 0.50% from other races, and 1.5% from two or more races. Hispanic or Latino of any race were 1.6% of the population.

There were 20,457 households, of which 42.6% had children under age 18 living with them, 61.3% were married couples living together, 7.7% had a female householder with no husband present, and 28.7% were non-families. 22.0% of all households were made up of individuals, and 3.4% had someone living alone who was 65 or older. The average household size was 2.68 and the average family size was 3.20.

In the city, 30.5% of the population was under the age of 18, 6.2% from 18 to 24, 35.6% from 25 to 44, 22.9% from 45 to 64, and 4.9% was 65 or older. The median age was 34. For every 100 females, there were 96.3 males. For every 100 females 18 and over, there were 92.8 males.

The median income for a household in the city was $54,328, and the median income for a family was $105,177. Males had a median income of $59,303 versus $37,196 for females. The per capita income for the city was $38,854. About 2.8% of families and 3.5% of the population were below the poverty line, including 7.9% of those under 18 and 6.3% of those 65 or older.

== Economy ==
Eden Prairie is home to more than 2,800 businesses, including many that specialize in logistics/distribution, retail and wholesale trade, health care, industrial equipment, communications, and information technology.

=== Top employers ===
According to the city's 2024 Economic Development Snapshot, its top employers were:

#	Employer	# of Employees
1	Optum	6500
2	C. H. Robinson	2500
3	Starkey Labs	2117
4	UNFI	1600
5	Eden Prairie School District	1285
6	Danfoss	440
7	Lifetouch	800
7	MTS Systems Corporation	800
8	Abbott Laboratories	617

Video game retailer FuncoLand, which operated in over 400 locations nationwide before its acquisition and merger, was headquartered in Eden Prairie.

== Arts and culture ==
In 2008, Eden Prairie raised roughly $500,000 from the community to build a veterans memorial. The memorial has two components, service to country and world peace. It was constructed in Purgatory Creek Park near the intersection of Technology Drive and Prairie Center Drive. Sculptor Neil Brodin designed and constructed two bronze sculptures. The service-to-country sculpture represents a wounded airman carried over the shoulders of a soldier in the battlefield.

The world-peace sculpture depicts a woman service member touching a globe, honoring women who have served. Community members could purchase a place on the memorial for the names of loved ones who served in any branch of the U.S. service in any war or conflict. Minnesota-based Cold Spring Granite provided Mesabi black granite for the memorial's walls.

== Sports ==
The 2017 USA Rink Bandy League Cannon Cup Playoffs took place at the Eden Prairie Rinks.

== Government ==
United States presidential election results for Eden Prairie, Minnesota
Year	Republican		Democratic		Third party(ies)	
Year	No.	%	No.	%	No.	%
2000	15,903	54.95%	11,691	40.39%	1,348	4.66%
2004	19,112	55.58%	14,968	43.53%	308	0.90%
2008	17,186	47.83%	18,264	50.83%	480	1.34%
2012	18,334	50.19%	17,527	47.98%	669	1.83%
2016	13,944	38.55%	19,040	52.63%	3,190	8.82%
2020	14,230	36.05%	24,352	61.68%	896	2.27%
2024	13,150	35.09%	23,239	62.01%	1,090	2.91%

Eden Prairie is in Minnesota's 3rd congressional district, represented by Kelly Morrison, a Democrat. City council officials include Mayor Ron Case and council members Mark Freiberg, Kathy Nelson, PG Narayanan and Lisa Toomey. The city manager is Rick Getschow.

The Eden Prairie Police Department has a chief, a captain, three lieutenants, about 66 sworn law-enforcement officers, and 30 civilian staff. The department was established on January 1, 1973. It has three divisions: Patrol, Investigations and Support. The Patrol Division includes SWAT and police dog elements.

== Education ==
The first school in Eden Prairie was Anderson School, a schoolhouse near a farm. At the time of its construction, it was in the center of the city. The former Eden Prairie Consolidated School, built in 1924, is now the school district Administration Building and is next to Central Middle School.

Eden Prairie operates eight K–12 schools, six elementary (PreK–5) schools (including one Spanish immersion), one middle school (6–8), and Eden Prairie High School (9–12). Eden Prairie High School is Minnesota's fifth-largest high school, with about 2,600 students, and is near the grounds of Round Lake Park and the Eden Prairie Community Center.

Some students attend public schools in other school districts chosen by their families under Minnesota's open enrollment statute.

Eden Prairie is home to one charter school, the Performing Institute of Minnesota Arts High School. Eden Prairie has one private school, The International School of Minnesota, which offers a private, non-denominational, college preparatory education for students from preschool through grade 12. The school, founded in 1985, features non-selective admissions and year-round open enrollment, daily world language education beginning in preschool, and 19 AP courses at the upper school level. The student body consists of 85% local residents and 15% international students.

Hennepin Technical College, whose main campus is in Brooklyn Park, Minnesota, has a campus in Eden Prairie with an enrollment of roughly 7,000 full- and part-time students. It offers day and night classes.

== Infrastructure ==
The city is served by the Canadian Pacific Kansas City (Soo Line) Chicago to Miles City line.

Work is being done on a light rail. Come 2027, the METRO Green Line Extension will be operational, connecting Eden Prairie to the communities of St. Louis Park, Hopkins, Minnetonka, and downtown Minneapolis.

== Notable people ==
- Andrew Alberts, former National Hockey League defenseman
- Leith Anderson, president of U.S. National Association of Evangelicals
- Adam Bartley, actor
- David Baszucki, CEO and co-founder of Roblox
- Jackson Blake, current Carolina Hurricanes Right Wing, 2026 Stanley Cup champion
- Michael Bland, former drummer for Prince and for Nick Jonas & the Administration
- Rachel Bootsma, swimmer and Olmympic gold medalist
- Jasper Brinkley, former linebacker for the Minnesota Vikings
- Jerry Burns, former head coach of the Minnesota Vikings; died in Eden Prairie
- Blake Cashman, linebacker for the Minnesota Vikings
- Laurie Coleman, actress and wife of former United States senator Norm Coleman
- Todd Downing, former offensive coordinator of the Oakland Raiders and Tennessee Titans; born in Eden Prairie
- Chuck Foreman, former running back for the Minnesota Vikings and New England Patriots
- Jay Foreman, former National Football League player; born in Eden Prairie
- Dan Gladden, former MLB player for Minnesota Twins, San Francisco Giants, Detroit Tigers, and Japanese Yomiuri Giants; radio broadcaster for the Twins
- Daerek Hart, professional gamer, particularly League of Legends
- Ben Husaby, 1992 and 1994 Olympic cross country skier
- Alla Ilushka, Miss USA 2007 contestant
- Jermaine Johnson, defensive end for the New York Jets
- Jackson LaCombe, defenceman for the Anaheim Ducks
- Sydney Langseth, forward for the Seattle Torrent
- Nick Leddy, defenseman for San Jose Sharks
- Mark LeVoir, former NFL offensive tackle
- Casey Mittelstadt, center for the Boston Bruins
- Reynold Philipsek, jazz guitarist
- Allison Pottinger, world champion curler
- Kyle Rau, forward for the Minnesota Wild, Florida Panthers and Kunlun Red Star of the KHL
- Robert Remus, a.k.a. Sgt. Slaughter, wrestler
- William Sawalich, NASCAR driver
- Malik Sealy, former guard for the Minnesota Timberwolves
- Nick Seeler, defenseman for the Philadelphia Flyers
- Sheila E., singer-songwriter, actress, percussionist
- Kenny Stills, former wide receiver for the New Orleans Saints and Miami Dolphins; born in Eden Prairie
- John Stone, former sheriff of Jefferson County, Colorado; died in Eden Prairie
- Charlie Vig, chairman of the Shakopee Mdewakanton Sioux Community since August 2012
- Ryan Wittman, college basketball player for Cornell University
- Ethan Wragge, basketball player with Gießen 46ers in Germany's Basketball Bundesliga

== In popular culture ==
The city's regional shopping mall, Eden Prairie Center, stood in for the Mall of America in the 1997 comic mockumentary Drop Dead Gorgeous. Two years earlier, the mall served as the principal filming location of Kevin Smith's Mallrats.

The railroad overpass that lent its name to the 1990 Prince album Graffiti Bridge passed over Valley View Road in the city's northwestern quadrant. It was torn down in 1991 to make way for an expansion of the road and has since been replaced with a bridge carrying the Minnesota River Bluffs LRT rail-to-trail recreational path. Prince also owned a warehouse on Flying Cloud Drive to rehearse and record music; today, the site is occupied by TGK Automotive.

The cult television show Mystery Science Theater 3000 was filmed out of an industrial park in Eden Prairie for much of its original run.
