= Sucker Lake (New York) =

- Location within New York Sucker Lake (the United States)
- Location: St. Lawrence County, New York, United States
- Coordinates: 44°10′47″N 75°07′10″W
- Type: Lake
- Basin countries: United States
- Surface area: 89 acres (0.36 km^{2})
- Average depth: 6 feet (1.8 m)
- Max. depth: 10 feet (3.0 m)
- Shore length^{1}: 2.4 miles (3.9 km)
- Surface elevation: 1,411 feet (430 m)
- Settlements: Coffins Mills, New York
- ^{1} Shore length is not a well-defined measure.

Sucker Lake is located by Coffins Mills, New York. The outlet creek flows into the Little River. Fish species present in the lake are white sucker, smallmouth bass, largemouth bass, rock bass, and black bullhead. There is a state owned beach launch off Briggs Switch Road. No gas motors allowed on this lake.
