= Newton Falls Reservoir =

- Location within New York
- Location: St. Lawrence County, New York, United States
- Coordinates: 44°13′13″N 74°58′47″W
- Type: Reservoir
- Primary inflows: Oswegatchie River
- Primary outflows: Oswegatchie River
- Basin countries: United States
- Surface area: 193 acres (0.78 km^{2})
- Average depth: 18 feet (5.5 m)
- Max. depth: 34 feet (10 m)
- Shore length^{1}: 4.3 miles (6.9 km)
- Surface elevation: 1,421 feet (433 m)
- Islands: 6
- Settlements: Newton Falls, New York
- ^{1} Shore length is not a well-defined measure.

Newton Falls Reservoir is a man-made lake located by Newton Falls, New York. Fish species present in the reservoir are smallmouth bass, northern pike, brown bullhead, rock bass, yellow perch, and white sucker. There is carry down access on the lake with permission from Reliant Energy.
