= Black River and St. Lawrence Railway =

Overview
- Locale: Carthage to Russell, New York
- Dates of operation: 1869–1872

Technical
- Track gauge: 4 ft 8 1/2 in (1,435 mm) standard gauge

The Black River and St. Lawrence Railway was a historic railroad in New York.

== History ==
Its history can be traced to 1866 when George Gilbert of Carthage, New York received a charter to build a railroad from Carthage in Jefferson County to the Oswegatchie River, at or near Harrisville, in Lewis County. Preliminary surveys began in the fall of 1866. It was incorporated on June 30, 1868.

The company was organized as the Black River and St. Lawrence Railway. Construction was contracted to the Row, Fields & Co., of Brockville, Ontario. Construction began on April 29, 1869 and continued through October, and resumed in 1870. Iron was quite expensive at the time, and the railroad was constructed with wooden rails. In 1882, The New York state Railway Commission report noted that the railway was not in operation, and that the original wooden rails had been removed.

Its locomotive was a 16-ton 0-4-0 w/4 wheel tender built September 1869 by the Smith & Porter Locomotive Works in Pittsburgh, Penna. c/n 50. It burned wood and had fancy (possibly gold & white) striping around the red tender tank which carried the name "PIONEER" on its sides. "B.R.& St.L.R.R." was lettered in the fancy elongated oval panel under the cab window. The stack was of a funnel shape. The tender had a 120" frame with a 112" tank and 33" wheels for wood rails, and arrived in August 1869. There is a builder photo in the Harold K. Vollrath Collection.

The company was reorganized as the Carthage and Adirondack Railway in the spring of 1883 after a mine owner in Jayville acquired the Black River and St. Lawrence Railway. He planned to extend the rails from Little River in St. Lawrence County to Jayville. Construction of the extension was completed in 1889.
