= Long Lake (Fine, St. Lawrence County, New York) =

- Location within New York Long Lake (the United States)
- Location: St. Lawrence County, New York, United States
- Coordinates: 44°06′31″N 75°09′23″W
- Type: Lake
- Primary outflows: Fish Creek
- Basin countries: United States
- Surface area: 38 acres (0.15 km^{2})
- Average depth: 8 feet (2.4 m)
- Max. depth: 27 feet (8.2 m)
- Shore length^{1}: 1.4 miles (2.3 km)
- Surface elevation: 1,358 feet (414 m)
- Settlements: Kalurah, New York
- ^{1} Shore length is not a well-defined measure.

Long Lake is located in St. Lawrence County in upstate New York on the edge of the High Peaks Wilderness Area.

It is located 16 miles west of Newcomb and about 70 miles southeast of Kalurah, New York.

Fish species present in the lake are brook trout, and black bullhead. Access is via Bushwhack Trail from Mud Creek.
