= Round Lake (Emmet County, Michigan) =

- Location within Michigan
- Location: Emmet County, Michigan
- Coordinates: 45°24′25″N 84°53′29″W
- Type: lake
- Surface area: 353.4 acres (143.0 ha)
- Average depth: 12 feet (3.7 m)
- Shore length^{1}: 3.3 miles (5.3 km)
- ^{1} Shore length is not a well-defined measure.

Round Lake is a lake in Emmet County, in the U.S. state of Michigan. It is a shallow lake that is 353 acres (143 ha) in size. Round Lake, originally called Waawiyegamag or Wayagamug, drains into Crooked Lake and is thus hydrologically the highest point on the watershed that feeds the Inland Waterway. The lake was a key waypoint for the Anishinaabe peoples, and its south shore was re-used in 1881–1882 as a right-of-way for the Grand Rapids and Indiana Railroad. This spurred development of the lake as a place of summer homes, which has continued to be a major usage to this day. There are two shoreline nature preserves, the Fochtman Nature Preserve and the Round Lake Nature Preserve.

From the summer of 1905 through 1917, a lakeshore site adjacent to the railroad line was used, by agreement between the railroad and a troupe of Anishinaabe role players, as a stage for the performance of a pageant, The Song of Hiawatha. The pageant featured indigenous dance and spoken parts in Anishinaabemowin, and a 2025 article credited the production with enabling the cross-generational maintenance of linguistic skills and performance identity among selected members of the represented nations.

The public road that serves the south shore of Round Lake and parallels the former railroad right-of-way is called Hiawatha Trail to honor the pageant.
