= Round Lake (Florida lake) =

- Location within Florida Location within the United States
- Location: Winter Haven, Florida
- Coordinates: 27.9631°N 81.6740°W
- Type: natural freshwater lake
- Basin countries: United States
- Max. length: 1,275 feet (389 m)
- Max. width: 1,220 feet (370 m)
- Surface area: 26.74 acres (11 ha)
- Surface elevation: 128 feet (39 m)
- Islands: approximately 10 minuscule islets along the shore

Round Lake is a natural freshwater lake on the south side of Winter Haven, Florida. It is almost round in shape and has a surface area of 26.74-acre (108,200 m^{2}). It is bordered on the north, east and southeast by houses in a gated community. On the south is a grass field, beyond which is Eloise Loop Road, and on the west and southwest is a citrus grove. Round Lake is about 660 feet (200 m) east of the south cove of Lake Winterset. This lake is swampy on much of its shore and there are ten or so minuscule islets along the shore.

Round Lake is completely surrounded by private property, which means the public needs to obtain permission to access the lake for fishing. There are no swimming beaches on the lake and only private boat and fishing docks. The Hook and Bullet website always lists the types of fish in lakes whether or not there is free public access to them. The website says this lake contains a large variety of fish. This website lists pumpkinseed, bluegill, yellow perch, bowfin, warmouth, gar, catfish (bullhead), green sunfish, carp, largemouth bass, crappie and rock bass.
