= Round Lake (Vancouver Island) =

- Location within Vancouver Island
- Location: Vancouver Island, British Columbia
- Coordinates: 49°21′00″N 125°01′00″W
- Lake type: Natural lake
- Basin countries: Canada

Round Lake is a lake located on Vancouver Island north of east end of Great Central Lake.

== See also ==
- List of lakes of British Columbia
