= Round Lake (Eden Prairie) =

Lake in Eden Prairie, Minnesota, United States

- Location within Minnesota Location within the United States
- Location: Eden Prairie, Hennepin County, Minnesota
- Coordinates: 44.8685°N 93.4925°W
- Basin countries: United States
- Shore length^{1}: approx. 1 mile (1.6 km)
- ^{1} Shore length is not a well-defined measure.

Round Lake is a lake in the city of Eden Prairie, Hennepin County, Minnesota. The lake is home to Round Lake Park and hosts various community gatherings such as the annual 4th of July Hometown Celebration and annual Eden Prairie Schooner Days Festival.

The lake is named after its near-perfect circular shape, and is 1 of at least 52 lakes with the name in Minnesota.

== Round Lake Park ==
Round Lake Park includes many amenities such as picnic areas, volleyball courts, tennis courts, ice rinks, baseball fields, a softball field, a boat launch, a fishing pier, a bike trail, a basketball court, a kid's playground, a maintained beach, a skate park, and a splash pad.

== August 22 2024 Firework Incident ==
On August 22nd, 2024, due to being rescheduled by bad weather, the Eden Prairie 4th of July Hometown Celebration took place. Shortly after the fireworks began, some flew towards spectators sitting on the west side of the lake, exploding in crowds of people, causing many to flee and leave their things behind. According to the Parks and Recreation Director Amy Markle, nobody was injured. The issue, a knocked over mortar, was quickly fixed and the fireworks finished without incident.

On the City of Eden Prairie Facebook page, Markle stated “We are very fortunate no one was injured during this accident, and we understand the unexpected event caused significant concern and alarm.”. Some residents feel that the city downplayed the incident in their response.

The following year, Markle announced that all attendees would be directed to view the event from Round Lake Park, and that the west side where the incident occurred would be closed off. This move came after reviewing safety protocols and consulting both the Eden Prairie Fire Department and the fireworks company.
