= Newton Falls, New York =

- hamlet
- Location within the state of New York
- Coordinates: 44°12′43.2″N 74°59′22.2″W
- Country: United States
- State: New York
- County: Saint Lawrence

Area
  - Total: 3.07 sq mi (7.94 km^{2})
  - Land: 2.95 sq mi (7.65 km^{2})
  - Water: 0.11 sq mi (0.29 km^{2})
- Elevation: 1,496 ft (456 m)

Population (2020)
  - Total: 4,557
  - Density: 1,542.3/sq mi (595.49/km^{2})
- Time zone: UTC-5 (Eastern (EST))
  - Summer (DST): UTC-4 (EDT)
- ZIP code: 13666
- Area code: 315
- FIPS code: 39-55650
- GNIS feature ID: 976719

Newton Falls is a hamlet of 400, located within Town of Clifton in Saint Lawrence County, New York, United States. The hamlet is located within the Adirondack Park. The area is known in part for its ZIP code, which is 13666.

The hamlet was named for James Newton, who built a sawmill in 1894 which became the Newton Falls Paper Mill; it closed in 2000. It was reopened in 2007 as Newton Falls Fine Paper through the efforts of former mill workers and town residents. The paper mill was again closed as of June 28, 2011.

== History ==
The hamlet was constructed as a mill town; it includes several Sears houses at the top of Plank Hill on the Newton Falls Road (County route 60) near Summit Avenue. In 1925 there were more than 800 residents. As late as 1941, there was six day a week New York Central mixed train running on the Carthage and Adirondack to Carthage, where connections could be made to the Utica to Philadelphia St. Lawrence Division; this service ended by 1946. Freight service continued for a few decades more. Until 1978 there was a huge iron strip mine, Benson Mines, and crushing plant at the junction of CR 60 and New York State Route 3 that shipped processed ore via rail; at its peak, it employed 1200 workers. The 100+ year old Newton Falls Hotel still stands, but is currently closed to the public.

=== Paper mill ===
The paper mill was opened by the Newton family in 1894. In 1920, the mill, operated as the Newton Falls Paper Company, was purchased by McGraw-Hill and United Publishers Corporation (Note: after a 1934 bankruptcy reorganization United Publishers Corporation assumed the name Chilton Company which it had purchased in 1923) (Note: in 1979, the Chilton Company was purchased by American Broadcasting Companies) to supply paper for the magazines they published. Each partner held a 50% stake in the mill.

After the 1978 closure of the iron mine, the mill was the hamlet's largest employer.

The mill remained with McGraw-Hill/ABC until it was purchased in 1984 by the Swedish multinational company Stora Kopparbergs Bergslag, Sweden's second-largest forest products company, and renamed Papyrus Newton Falls, Inc., in 1989. Papyrus was the fine papers division of Stora. Later that year it was renamed to Stora Papyrus Newton Falls, Inc. The mill was purchased in 1996 by Appleton Papers Inc., a leading worldwide producer of carbonless paper and the leading U.S. producer of thermal paper.

It closed in 2000 when Appleton decided to consolidate the operation closer to its home in Kimberly, Wisconsin.

New paper mill owners, Dennis L. Bunnell and partners and Scotia Investments out of Canada were secured through heavy community involvement. The mill reopened on September 7, 2007, under the new name of Newton Falls Fine Paper. The paper mill was permanently closed as of June 28, 2011.

The papermill sustained heavy damage from a fire in September 2025. The fire is under investigation by New York State Police - Canton BCI.

== Geography ==
44° 12' 43.20", -74° 59' 22.20" Newton Falls is located at 44°12′43″N 74°59′22″W (44.2106178, -74.9890831).

== Demographics ==
Historical population
Census	Pop.	Note	%±
2020	4,557		—
U.S. Decennial Census

== Education ==
Newton Falls is served by the Clifton-Fine Central School district.
