= Round Lake (Snohomish County, Washington) =

Glacial lake in Snohomish County, Washington, USA

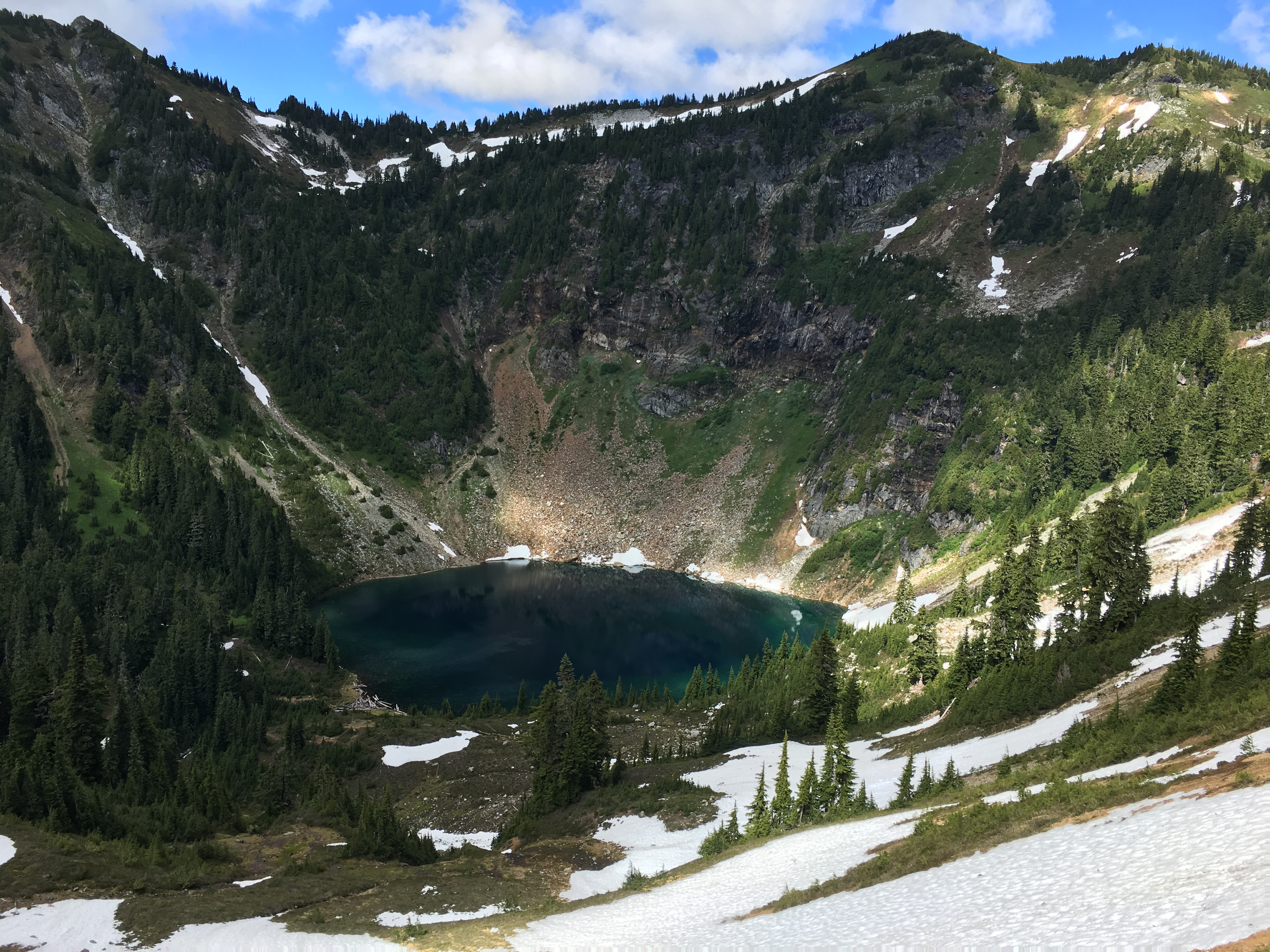
- Lake as viewed from ridge trail.

- Location within Washington (state) Location within the United States
- Location: Snohomish County, Washington
- Coordinates: 48°7′18″N 121°18′36″W
- Type: Glacial
- Primary outflows: Pugh Creek
- Basin countries: United States
- Surface area: 16.5 acres (6.7 ha)
- Surface elevation: 5,052 ft (1,540 m)
- Islands: 0

Round Lake is a glacial lake located in Snohomish County, Washington near Sloan Peak. The lake is an area for hiking and fishing.
