= Round Lake (Bonner County, Idaho) =

Lake near Sagle, Bonner County, Idaho, United States

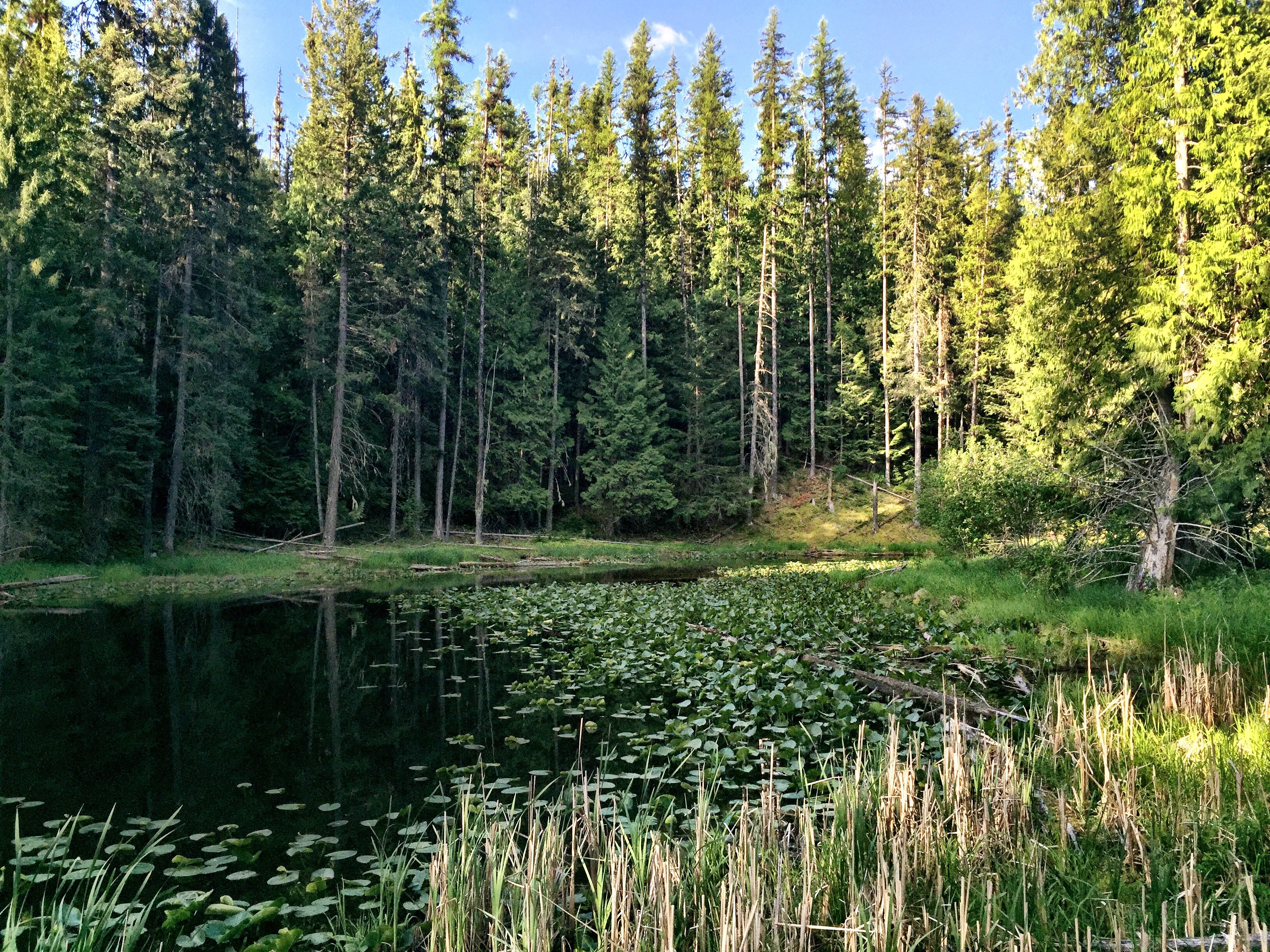

- Location within Idaho Location within the United States
- Location: Bonner County, Idaho, United States
- Coordinates: 48°09′36″N 116°38′17″W
- Primary inflows: Cocolalla Lake via Cocolalla Creek
- Primary outflows: Cocolalla Creek
- Max. length: 1,538 ft (469 m)
- Max. width: 1,405 ft (428 m)
- Surface area: 54.9 acres (22.2 ha)
- Max. depth: 34 ft (10 m)
- Shore length^{1}: 1.2 mi (1.9 km)
- Surface elevation: 2,126 ft (648 m)
- ^{1} Shore length is not a well-defined measure.

Round Lake is a 55-acre (22 ha) body of water located four miles (6.4 km) southwest of Sagle in Bonner County, Idaho. It is the prime feature of Round Lake State Park and has 1.2 miles (1.9 km) of shoreline. The maximum water depth is 34 feet (10 meters). The lakeshore and watershed are heavily forested and undeveloped. The shoreline is undeveloped except for the public swimming beach at the state park.

Round Lake is eutrophic; its primary water source is Cocolalla Lake via Cocolalla Creek. The outflow is via the continuation of Cocolalla Creek. Most of the lake bottom is silt and detritus. Shore areas with a sandy bottom include the state park swimming beach.
