= Round Lake (Berrien County, Michigan) =

- Location within Michigan
- Location: Berrien County, Michigan
- Coordinates: 41°50′14″N 86°25′07″W
- Type: lake
- Surface area: 6.062 acres (2.453 ha)

Round Lake is a lake in Berrien County, in the U.S. state of Michigan. It is 6.062 acres (2.453 ha) in size.

Round Lake was so named on account of the shape of its outline.
