= Benson Mines =

Closed iron ore mine in the Adirondack Mountains of New York

- Location within New York
- Location: New York, United States; 44°10′34″N 74°59′53″W
- Products: Iron Ore
- Type: Open Pit
- Discovered: 1810
- Opened: 1890
- Closed: 1978
- Company: Jones and Laughlin Steel Corporation
- Acquired: 1941

The Benson Mine is an iron-ore mine located near Star Lake, a village in the southern St. Lawrence County, New York.

The ore body at Benson Mine was discovered in 1810 by engineers conducting a survey for a new military road from Albany to Ogdensburg. In the 1950s, the mine was considered the largest open-pit iron-ore mine in the world. The mine was finally closed in 1978.

== History ==
The engineers noticed the spinning of their compass needles due to the large quantities of magnetic ore under their feet. In 1889, the Magnetic Iron Company began developing the Star Lake ore body, which sat under some three-thousand acres of land. Production of ore halted in 1893 with a depression in the iron ore industry, but resumed in 1900. In 1910, the Benson Mines Company bought the site from the Magnetic Iron Company and continued operations on and off until 1918. At the onset of World War II, Benson Mines reopened when Jones and Laughlin Steel Corporation leased the site. The U.S Department of Defense built ore processing facilities and the iron-ore was shipped to Pittsburgh for use in the war effort. The mining operation expanded significantly in the 1950s, and was renamed the New York Ore Division, although control remained in the hands of the Jones and Laughlin Steel Corporation. At its height, the company employed 840 workers in 1960.

With the economic prosperity of the 1950s and 1960s the Company took a leading role in community development. The company published a magazine called Men and Steel, which provided “general information about different parts of the plant… *as well as+…personal interest stories, *and+ weddings births, deaths, anniversaries, and other family news…” In 1952, the magazine highlighted the Company’s financial contributions to town projects, which included construction of the Central School building, water system, housing project, and hospital.

=== 21st century ===
In late 2016, negotiations between St Lawrence County and the New York State Department of Environmental Conservation, and other agencies, ended in an agreement allowing demolition of the remaining buildings on the site to begin. By the end of 2018, almost all buildings and structures on the site had been demolished. In October 2023, New York State Governor Kathy Hochul announced that the New York Energy Research and Development Authority is seeking a partner to transform the site into "one of the largest" solar projects in the Adirondack Park, with the intention of the project helping New York reach its clean energy goals.

== Mining ==
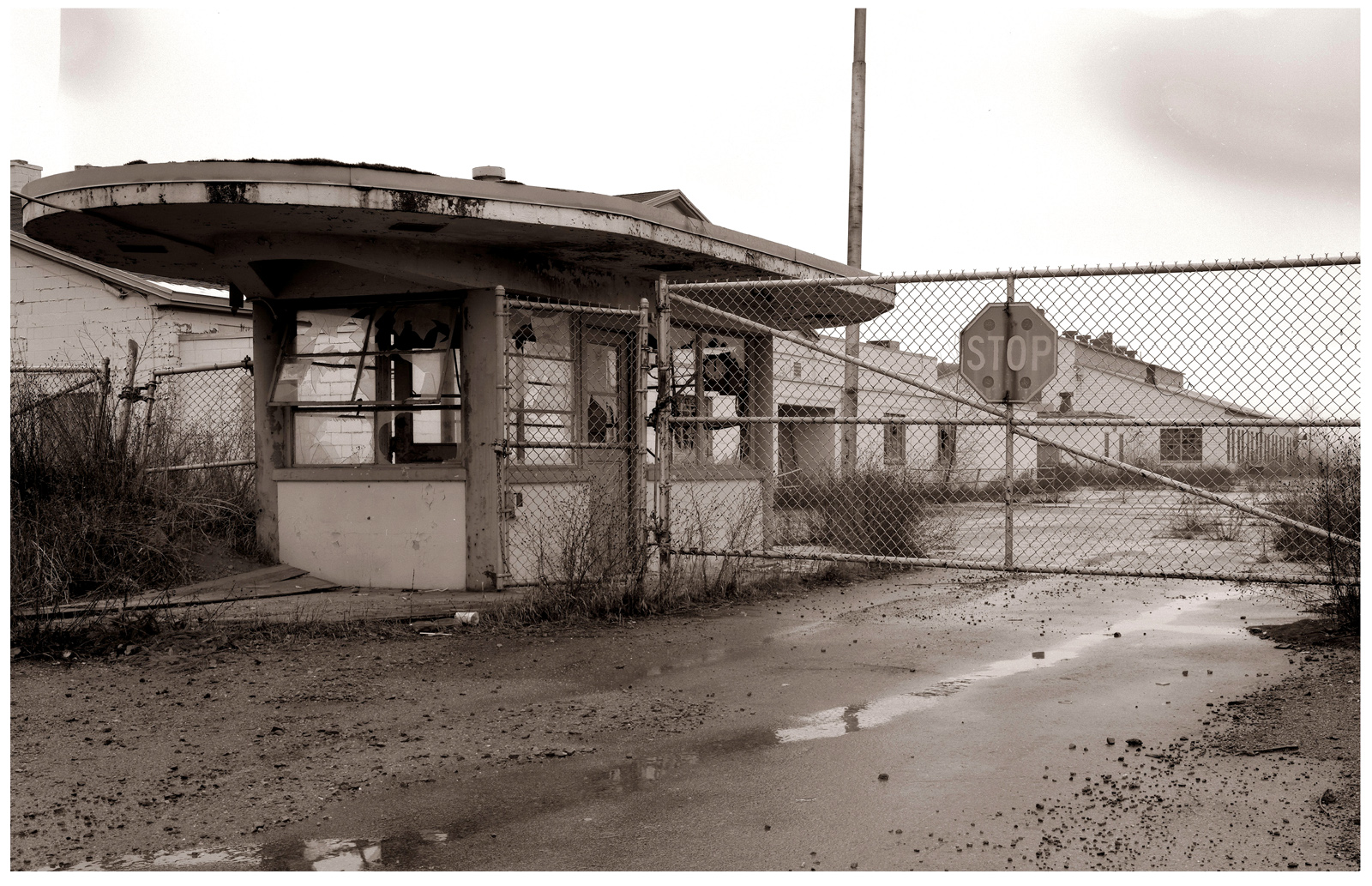
Gatehouse of the former Benson Mines, 1991 by Philip G Coman

The ore body at Benson Mine is composed of magnetite and non-magnetite ore. The average percentage of iron in both magnetite and non-magnetite ore was about 23%, less than the 40% at Chateauguay. Iron-ore deposits that contained 50% or more iron were depleted in the United States by the mid-1940s. The ability to concentrate “non-magnetite ores by gravity processes” at Benson mines ensured its economic expansion because these processes enabled lower grade iron ore to be used in steel-making. In 1952, a gravity plant was built, which allowed non-magnetic ore to be processed on site. Ore was extracted using open pit mining methods. Holes were bored in the ground and filled with explosives. “About two gross tons of crude ore… *were produced+ per pound of explosive used.” A four ton ball on a crane smashed the ore into smaller pieces, which were then loaded onto a dump truck and transported to the Coarse Crushing Plant, which broke the ore into pieces three-inches in diameter. A conveyor belt then took the ore to the Fine Crushing Plant, which reduced it in size to “one and one-half inch in diameter.” The ore was sometimes crushed into even smaller pieces of “five eights of an inch” before it was sintered, concentrated, and transported to steel manufacturing centers. Sintering merges ore with coke so it is easier to process in steel facilities.

On average, the Jones and Laughlin Steel Corporation shipped about 1 million tons of iron ore sinter each year to steel plants in Pittsburgh and Aliquippa, PA, and Cleveland, OH using the New York Central Railroad. Trains left from the Watertown Junction, traveled to the Benson Mine to pick up ore, returned to Watertown, and then continued on to Syracuse, Buffalo, Pittsburgh, and Ohio. The iron from Benson Mines was used in the steel production for Chrysler cars. The process of open pit mining, which eliminated the need for costly underground mining, and “the relative softness of the rock, which simplified crushing and extraction…” served to the mine’s advantage; however, the “low iron-content of the ore…*and+…the remoteness of the mine from navigable water, necessitating relatively costly rail transportation” eventually hampered the mine’s financial success. Also, increasing pressure from foreign competitors, which were selling duty-free iron-ore products to the United States, caused the entire U.S steel industry to decline and collapse throughout the 1960s.

== Closing of Mine ==
The Benson Mine was a staple of the local economy. It employed hundreds of workers and supported over 1,900 people near the end of its operations. The mine also paid over 400,000 dollars each year in taxes, which helped to maintain local infrastructure and services. When the Benson Mine closed in August 1978 more than 365 people lost their jobs, and Star Lake slipped sharply into economic decline. The number of students enrolled in local schools dropped from 1,400 in 1978 to 625 the following year.
