= Round Lake (St. Lawrence County, New York) =

Lake in New York, United States

- Location within New York Location within the United States
- Location: St. Lawrence County, New York, United States
- Coordinates: 44.0648°N 75.1033°W
- Primary inflows: Fish Creek
- Primary outflows: Fish Creek
- Basin countries: United States
- Surface area: 78 acres (0.32 km^{2})
- Average depth: 16 feet (4.9 m)
- Max. depth: 42 feet (13 m)
- Shore length^{1}: 1.3 miles (2.1 km)
- Surface elevation: 1,342 feet (409 m)
- Islands: 1
- Settlements: Kalurah, New York
- ^{1} Shore length is not a well-defined measure.

Round Lake is located southeast of Kalurah, New York. Fish species present in the lake are brook trout, and black bullhead. Access via old railroad bed from the west and a trail from Aldric from the east.
