= Star Lake, New York =

- CDP
- Location within the state of New York
- Coordinates: 44°9′36″N 75°1′58″W
- Country: United States
- State: New York
- County: St. Lawrence

Area
  - Total: 4.76 sq mi (12.34 km^{2})
  - Land: 4.34 sq mi (11.24 km^{2})
  - Water: 0.42 sq mi (1.10 km^{2})
- Elevation: 1,486 ft (453 m)

Population (2020)
  - Total: 631
  - Density: 145.5/sq mi (56.16/km^{2})
- Time zone: UTC-5 (Eastern (EST))
  - Summer (DST): UTC-4 (EDT)
- FIPS code: 36-70849
- GNIS feature ID: 0977057

Star Lake is a hamlet (and census-designated place) in the Adirondack Mountains of St. Lawrence County, New York, United States. As of the 2020 census, Star Lake had a population of 631.

Star Lake is in the Town of Clifton, but part of the community is in the Town of Fine.

The community is located east of a very angular-shaped lake, also called Star Lake.

== History ==
Star Lake was listed on the National Register of Historic Places in 2012.

== Geography ==
Star Lake is located at 44°09′36″N 75°01′58″W.

According to the United States Census Bureau, the CDP has a total area of 4.8 square miles (12 km^{2}), of which 4.4 square miles (11 km^{2}) is land and 0.4 square miles (1.0 km^{2}) (8.11%) is water.

Star Lake is served by east–west New York State Route 3.

The community is within the Adirondack Park.

== Demographics ==
Historical population
| Census | Pop. | Note | %± |
|---|---|---|---|
| 2020 | 631 | | — |
U.S. Decennial Census

As of the census of 2000, there were 860 people, 363 households, and 235 families residing in the village. The population density was 194.5 inhabitants per square mile (75.1/km^{2}). There were 526 housing units at an average density of 119.0 per square mile (45.9/km^{2}). The racial makeup of the CDP was 95.58% White, 0.35% African American, 1.63% Native American, 0.47% Asian, 0.23% from other races, and 1.74% from two or more races. Hispanic or Latino of any race were 1.05% of the population.

There were 363 households, out of which 26.7% had children under the age of 18 living with them, 49.3% were married couples living together, 10.5% had a female householder with no husband present, and 35.0% were non-families. 30.3% of all households were made up of individuals, and 15.7% had someone living alone who was 65 years of age or older. The average household size was 2.36 and the average family size was 2.85.

In the community, the population was spread out, with 23.6% under the age of 18, 6.7% from 18 to 24, 26.3% from 25 to 44, 26.6% from 45 to 64, and 16.7% who were 65 years of age or older. The median age was 41 years. For every 100 females, there were 95.9 males. For every 100 females age 18 and over, there were 92.7 males.

The median income for a household in the region was $34,083, and the median income for a family was $42,292. Males had a median income of $40,789 versus $21,806 for females. The per capita income for the CDP was $18,310. About 17.6% of families and 21.0% of the population were below the poverty line, including 30.0% of those under age 18 and 11.3% of those age 65 or over.

== Education ==
The census-designated place is in the Clifton-Fine Central School District.
