= List of high schools in South Dakota =

This is a list of high schools in the state of South Dakota.

== Current schools ==
School	Type	City	County	Mascot
Aberdeen Christian High School	Private	Aberdeen	Brown	Knights
Alcester-Hudson High School	Public	Alcester	Union	Cubs
Andes Central High School	Public	Lake Andes	Charles Mix	Eagles
Arlington High School	Public	Arlington	Kingsbury	Cardinals
Armour High School	Public	Armour	Douglas	Nighthawks
Avon High School	Public	Avon	Bon Homme	Pirates
Baltic High School	Public	Baltic	Minnehaha	Bulldogs
Belle Fourche High School	Public	Belle Fourche	Butte	Broncs
Bennett County High School	Public	Martin	Bennett	Warriors
Beresford High School	Public	Beresford	Union	Watchdogs
Bison High School	Public	Bison	Perkins	Cardinals
Bon Homme High School	Public	Tyndall	Bon Homme	Cavaliers
Bowdle High School	Public	Bowdle	Edmunds	Bobcats
Brandon Valley High School	Public	Brandon	Minnehaha	Lynx
Bridgewater-Emery High School	Public	Bridgewater	McCook	Huskies/Seahawks
Britton-Hecla High School	Public	Britton	Marshall	Braves
Brookings High School	Public	Brookings	Brookings	Bobcats
Burke High School	Public	Burke	Gregory	Cougars
Canistota High School	Public	Canistota	McCook	Hawks
Canton High School	Public	Canton	Lincoln	C-Hawks
Career & Technology Education Campus School		Nemo	Lawrence	None
Castlewood High School	Public	Castlewood	Hamlin	Warriors
Centerville High School	Public	Centerville	Turner	Tornadoes
Central High School	Public	Aberdeen	Brown	Golden Eagles
Central High School	Public	Rapid City	Pennington	Cobblers
Chamberlain High School	Public	Chamberlain	Brule	Cubs
Chester High School	Public	Chester	Lake	Flyers
Cheyenne-Eagle Butte School	Public	Eagle Butte	Dewey	Braves
Clark High School	Public	Clark	Clark	Cyclones
Colome High School	Public	Colome	Tripp	Cowboys
Colman-Egan High School	Public	Colman	Moody	Hawks
Corsica-Stickney High School	Public	Corsica	Douglas	Comets
Crazy Horse School	Public	Wanblee	Jackson	Chiefs
Crow Creek Tribal School	Public	Stephan	Hyde	Chieftains
Custer High School	Public	Custer	Custer	Wildcats
Dakota Christian High School	Private	New Holland	Douglas	Cadets
Dakota Valley High School	Public	North Sioux City	Union	Panthers
Dell Rapids High School	Public	Dell Rapids	Minnehaha	Quarriers
De Smet High School	Public	De Smet	Kingsbury	Bulldogs
Deubrook High School	Public	White	Brookings	Dolphins
Deuel High School	Public	Clear Lake	Deuel	Cardinals
Doland High School	Public	Doland	Spink	Wheelers
Douglas High School	Public	Box Elder	Pennington	Patriots
Dupree High School	Public	Dupree	Ziebach	Tigers
Edgemont High School	Public	Edgemont	Fall River	Moguls
Edmunds Central High School	Public	Roscoe	Edmunds	Raiders
Elk Point-Jefferson High School	Public	Elk Point	Union	Huskies
Elkton-Lake Benton High School	Public	Elkton	Brookings	Elks
Estelline High School	Public	Estelline	Hamlin	Red Hawks
Ethan High School	Public	Ethan	Davison	Rustlers
Faith High School	Public	Faith	Meade	Longhorns
Faulkton High School	Public	Faulkton	Faulk	Trojans
Flandreau High School	Public	Flandreau	Moody	Fliers
Flandreau Indian School		Flandreau	Moody	Indians
Florence High School	Public	Florence	Codington	Falcons
Frederick High School	Public	Frederick	Brown	Vikings/Titans
Freeman Academy	Private	Freeman	Hutchinson	Bobcats
Freeman High School	Public	Freeman	Hutchinson	Flyers
Garretson High School	Public	Garretson	Minnehaha	Blue Dragons
Gayville-Volin High School	Public	Gayville	Yankton	Raiders
Gettysburg High School	Public	Gettysburg	Potter	Battlers
Great Plains Lutheran High School	Private	Watertown	Codington	Panthers
Grant-Deuel High School	Public	Revillo	Grant	Wildcats
Gregory High School	Public	Gregory	Gregory	Gorillas
Groton High School	Public	Groton	Brown	Tigers
Hamlin High School	Public	Hayti	Hamlin	Chargers
Hanson High School	Public	Alexandria	Hanson	Beavers/Beaverettes
Harding County High School	Public	Buffalo	Harding	Ranchers
Harrisburg High School	Public	Harrisburg	Lincoln	Tigers
Henry High School	Public	Henry	Codington	Falcons
Herreid High School	Public	Herreid	Campbell	Yellowjackets
Highmore-Harrold High School	Public	Highmore	Hyde	Pirates
Hill City High School	Public	Hill City	Pennington	Rangers
Hitchcock-Tulare High School	Public	Tulare	Spink	Patriots
Hoven High School	Public	Hoven	Potter	Greyhounds/Battlers
Hot Springs High School	Public	Hot Springs	Fall River	Bison
Howard High School	Public	Howard	Miner	Tigers
Huron High School	Public	Huron	Beadle	Tigers
Ipswich High School	Public	Ipswich	Edmunds	Tigers
Irene High School	Public	Irene	Yankton	Eagles
Iroquois High School	Public	Iroquois	Kingsbury	Chiefs
James Valley Christian School	Private	Huron	Beadle	Vikings
Joe Foss Alternative High School	Alternative public	Sioux Falls	Minnehaha	
Jones County High School	Public	Murdo	Jones	Coyotes
Kadoka Area High School	Public	Kadoka	Jackson	Kougars
Kimball High School	Public	Kimball	Brule	Kiotes
Lake Preston High School	Public	Lake Preston	Kingsbury	Divers
Lakota Tech High School	Public	Pine Ridge	Oglala Lakota	Tatanka
Langford High School	Public	Langford	Marshall	Lions
Lead-Deadwood High School	Public	Lead	Lawrence	Golddiggers
Lemmon High School	Public	Lemmon	Perkins	Cowboys
Lennox High School	Public	Lennox	Lincoln	Orioles
Leola High School	Public	Leola	McPherson	Pirates/Titans
Lincoln High School	Public	Sioux Falls	Minnehaha	Patriots
Liberty Baptist Academy	Private	Rapid City	Pennington	
Little Wound School		Kyle	Oglala Lakota	Mustangs
Lower Brule High School		Lower Brule	Lyman	Sioux
Lutheran High School of Sioux Falls	Private	Sioux Falls	Lincoln	Eagles
Lyman High School	Public	Presho	Lyman	Raiders
Madison High School	Public	Madison	Lake	Bulldogs
Marion High School	Public	Marion	Turner	Bears
Marty Indian School		Marty	Charles Mix	Braves
McCook Central High School	Public	Salem	McCook	Cougars
McIntosh High School	Public	McIntosh	Corson	Tigers
McLaughlin High School	Public	McLaughlin	Corson	Mustangs
Menno High School	Public	Menno	Hutchinson	Wolves
Milbank High School	Public	Milbank	Grant	Bulldogs
Miller High School	Public	Miller	Hand	Rustlers
Mitchell Christian High School	Private	Mitchell	Davison	Golden Eagles
Mitchell High School	Public	Mitchell	Davison	Kernels
Mobridge-Pollock High School	Public	Mobridge	Walworth	Tigers
Montrose High School	Public	Montrose	McCook	Fighting Irish
Mount Vernon High School	Public	Mount Vernon	Davison	Mustangs
Northwestern High School	Public	Mellette	Spink	Wildcats
Newell High School	Public	Newell	Butte	Irrigators
New Underwood High School	Public	New Underwood	Pennington	Tigers
Oelrichs High School	Public	Oelrichs	Fall River	Tigers
O'Gorman High School	Private	Sioux Falls	Minnehaha	Knights
Oldham-Ramona High School	Public	Ramona	Lake	Rockets/Raiders
Parker High School	Public	Parker	Turner	Pheasants
Parkston High School	Public	Parkston	Hutchinson	Trojans
Philip High School	Public	Philip	Haakon	Scotties
Pine Ridge School		Pine Ridge	Oglala Lakota	Thorpes
Plankinton High School	Public	Plankinton	Aurora	Pirates/Warriors
Platte-Geddes High School	Public	Platte	Charles Mix	Black Panthers
Rapid City High School	Public Alternative	Rapid City	Pennington	Eagles
Rapid City Christian School	Private	Rapid City	Pennington	Comets
Red Cloud Indian School		Pine Ridge	Oglala Lakota	Crusaders
Redfield High School	Public	Redfield	Spink	Pheasants
Roncalli High School	Private	Aberdeen	Brown	Cavaliers
Roosevelt High School	Public	Sioux Falls	Minnehaha	Rough Riders
Rosholt High School	Public	Rosholt	Roberts	Raiders/Tigers
Rutland High School	Public	Rutland	Lake	Raiders
St. Francis Indian School		St. Francis	Todd	Warriors
St. Mary High School	Private	Dell Rapids	Minnehaha	Cardinals
St. Mary's Catholic School	Private	Salem	McCook	Falcons
St. Thomas More High School	Private	Rapid City	Pennington	Cavaliers
Sanborn Central High School	Public	Forestburg	Sanborn	Rebels
Scotland High School	Public	Scotland	Bon Homme	Highlanders
Second Chance High School	Alternative public	Mitchell	Davison	
Selby High School	Public	Selby	Walworth	Lions
Sioux Falls Christian High School	Private	Sioux Falls	Lincoln	Chargers
Sioux Falls New Technology High School	Public	Sioux Falls	Minnehaha	
Sioux Valley High School	Public	Volga	Brookings	Cossacks
Sisseton High School	Public	Sisseton	Roberts	Redmen
South Central High School	Public	Bonesteel	Gregory	Cougars
South Dakota School for the Blind and Visually Impaired	Public	Aberdeen	Brown	Pioneers
Spearfish High School	Public	Spearfish	Lawrence	Spartans
Stanley County High School	Public	Fort Pierre	Stanley	Buffalos
Stevens High School	Public	Rapid City	Pennington	Raiders
Sturgis Academy	Alternative public	Sturgis	Meade	
Sturgis Brown High School	Public	Sturgis	Meade	Scoopers
Sully Buttes High School	Public	Onida	Sully	Chargers
Summit High School	Public	Summit	Roberts	Eagles
Sunshine Bible Academy	Private	rural^{[A]}	Hand	Crusaders
Takini High School	Public	Howes	Meade	Skyhawks
Tea Area High School	Public	Tea	Lincoln	Titans
T.F. Riggs High School	Public	Pierre	Hughes	Governors
Jefferson High School	Public	Sioux Falls	Minnehaha	Cavaliers
Timber Lake High School	Public	Timber Lake	Dewey	Panthers
Tiospaye Topa High School		Ridgeview	Dewey	Thunder Hawks
Tiospa Zina High School		Agency Village	Roberts	Wambdi
Todd County High School	Public	Mission	Todd	Falcons
Tripp-Delmont High School	Public	Tripp	Hutchinson	Nighthawks
Tri-Valley High School	Public	Colton	Minnehaha	Mustangs
Vermillion High School	Public	Vermillion	Clay	Tanagers
Viborg-Hurley High School	Public	Viborg	Turner	Cougars
Wagner High School	Public	Wagner	Charles Mix	Red Raiders
Wall High School	Public	Wall	Pennington	Eagles
Wakpala High School	Public	Wakpala	Corson	Sioux
Washington High School	Public	Sioux Falls	Minnehaha	Warriors
Warner High School	Public	Warner	Brown	Monarchs
Watertown Senior High School	Public	Watertown	Codington	Arrows
Waubay High School	Public	Waubay	Day	Dragons
Waverly-South Shore High School	Public	Waverly	Codington	Coyotes
Webster High School	Public	Webster	Day	Bearcats
Wessington Springs High School	Public	Wessington Springs	Jerauld	Spartans
West Central High School	Public	Hartford	Minnehaha	Trojans
White Lake High School	Public	White Lake	Aurora	Wolverines
White River High School	Public	White River	Mellette	Tigers
Willow Lake High School	Public	Willow Lake	Clark	Pirates
Wilmot High School	Public	Wilmot	Roberts	Wolves
Winner High School	Public	Winner	Tripp	Warriors
Wolsey-Wessington High School	Public	Wolsey	Beadle	Warbirds
Woonsocket High School	Public	Woonsocket	Sanborn	Redmen/Lady Redmen
Yankton High School	Public	Yankton	Yankton	Bucks/Gazelles

== Closed schools ==
This is an incomplete list of former schools, nicknames, years closed, and additional info.

- Agar High School "Hi-Pointers" (pre-1984)/"Chargers" (1993-20??), Agar (Closed 1984, reopened 1993, closed 20??, now part of Sully Buttes High School)
- Akaska High School "Raiders"
- Alpena High School "Wildcats", Alpena
- Amherst High School "Wildcats"
- Andover High School "Gorillas"
- Ardmore High School "Rattlers"
- Argonne High School "Arrows"
- Artesian-Letcher High School "Rams", Artesian (Closed, now part of Sanborn Central High School)
- Ashton High School "Cardinals"
- Astoria High School "Comets"
- Athol High School "Arrows"
- Augustana Academy "Knights", Canton
- Bancroft Eagles
- Barnard Bears
- Bath Warriors
- Belvidere Comets
- Big Stone City Lions
- Blunt Monarchs
- Bonesteel Tigers
- Bonilla Eagles
- Bradley Bombers
- Brandt Bulldogs
- Brentford Braves
- Bridgewater Wildcats
- Bristol High School "Pirates", Bristol (Closed in 2004)
- Bruce Bees
- Bryant Scotties
- Buffalo Gap Buffaloes
- Burbank Owls
- Burke Bulldogs
- Canning Coyotes
- Canova Eagles
- Carthage Eagles
- Cathedral High School "Gaels", Rapid City
- Cathedral High School "Irish", Sioux Falls
- Cavour Cougars
- Chancellor Wildcats
- Claire City Comets
- Claremont Honkers
- Clark Comets
- Colman Wildcats
- Colton Panthers
- Conde High School "Spartans", Conde (closed, now part of Doland High, Groton High, Northwestern High)
- Corona Midgets
- Corsica Comets
- Cottonwood Coyotes
- Columbia Comets
- Cresbard High School "Comets", Cresbard (Closed, now part of Faulkton Area School)
- Dallas Coyotes
- Dante Gophers
- Davis Bulldogs
- Deadwood Bears
- Delmont Wildcats
- Draper Bulldogs
- Eagle Butte Warriors
- Eastern High School "Yellowjackets", Madison
- Egan Bluejays
- Elk Point Pointers
- Emery High School "Eagles", Emery (Consolidated with Bridgewater in 2011, now called Bridgewater-Emery High School)
- Erwin Arrows
- Fairfax Broncos
- Farmer Orioles
- Fedora Tigers
- Florence Flyers
- Forestburg Buccaneers
- Frankfort Falcons
- Franklin Flyers
- Fort Pierre Buffaloes
- Fort Thompson Buffaloes
- Fulton Pirates
- Gann Valley Buffaloes
- Garden City Dragons
- Gary Tigers
- Gayville Orioles
- Geddes Rams
- General Beadle High School "Bluejays", Madison
- Glenham High School "Eagles", Glenham, South Dakota (closed in 1984, now part of Selby Area Schools)
- Goodwin Eagles
- Harrold High School, Harrold (Closed, now part of Highmore-Harrold Schools)
- Hartford Pirates
- Hayti Redbirds
- Hazel Mustangs
- Hecla Rockets
- Henry Owls
- Hetland Broncos
- Hitchcock Bluejays
- Holabird Cardinals
- Hosmer Tigers (Closed, now part of Edmunds-Central Schools)
- Hudson Trojans
- Humboldt Eagles
- Hurley High School "Bulldogs", Hurley, (Closed, now part of Viborg-Hurley High School)
- Interior Cubs
- Irene High School "Cardinals", Irene (Closed, now part of Irene-Wakonda)
- Isabel High School "Wildcats", Isabel (Closed, now Part of Timber Lake High, Mclntosh High)
- Java Panthers (Closed, now part of Selby Area Schools)
- Jefferson Blackhawks
- Kennebec Canaries
- Kidder Tigers
- Lake City Golden Eagles
- Lake Norden Bluejays
- Lane Trojans
- Lebanon Bulldogs
- Letcher Tigers
- Lily Wildcats
- Logan Arrows
- Loyalton Lions
- Lyons Lions
- Midland High School, Midland (Closed, now part of Kadoka Area High School)
- Martin Warriors
- Meckling Panthers
- Melette Terriers
- Monroe "Wooden Shoed Canaries"
- New Effington Tigers
- Nisland Mustangs
- Northville Panthers
- Northwestern Lutheran Academy Wildcats
- Notre Dame High School "Comets", Mitchell
- Oldham Dragons
- Olivet Eagles
- Onaka Pirates
- Onida Warriors
- Orient Hawks
- Orland Eagles
- Peever Panthers
- Pickstown Engineers
- Piedmont Hawks
- Pierpont Panthers
- Plano Panthers
- Pollock High School "Bulldogs", Pollock (Closed, now part of Mobridge-Pollock High School)
- Polo Bears
- Presho Wolves
- Provo Rattlers
- Pukwana Wildcats
- Quinn Quintuplets
- Ramona Rockets
- Ravinia Bears
- Raymond Redwings
- Ree Heights Warriors
- Reliance Longhorns
- Rockham Trojans
- Roscoe Hornets
- Roslyn High School "Vikings", Roslyn
- Rutland Ramblers
- St. Agatha High School "Agates", Howard
- St. Lawrence Wolves
- St. Martens High School "Ravens", Rapid City
- St. Thomas Shamrocks
- Salem Cubs
- Seneca Bluejays
- Sherman Tigers
- Sinai Rebels
- Spencer Cardinals
- South Dakota School for the Deaf Pheasants
- South Shore Comets
- Springfield Trojans
- Stickney High School "Raiders", Stickney (Closed, now part of Corsica-Stickney High School)
- Strandburg Tigers
- Stratford Vikings
- Tabor Cardinals
- Thomas Tigers
- Thompson Buffaloes
- Thorpe Wolves
- Trent Warriors
- Toronto Vikings
- Tripp Wildcats
- Tulare Chieftains
- Turton Frogs
- Tyndall Panthers
- Vale Beetdiggers
- Valley Springs Wolverines
- Veblen High School "Cardinals", Veblen (Closed, now part of Sisseton High School)
- Vienna Panthers
- Virgil Pirates
- Vivian Bearcats
- Volin Bluejays
- Wakonda High School "Warriors", Wakonda (Closed, now part of Irene-Wakonda)
- Wallace Bulldogs
- Wasta Flyers
- Waverly Woodchucks
- Wentworth Warriors
- Wessington Warriors
- Wessington Springs Academy "Hornets", Wessington Springs
- West Lyman Raiders
- White Wildcats
- White Lake Wolverines
- Winfred Warriors
- Willow Lake Pirates
- Witten Wildcats
- Wolsey Cardinals
- Wood Bulldogs
- Worthing Eagles
- Yale Trojans

== See also ==
- List of school districts in South Dakota
- List of colleges and universities in South Dakota

== Notes ==
A Sunshine Bible Academy is located 13 miles south of Miller.

== Sources ==
- Links to school web-sites.
- South Dakota High School Activities Association
