= List of school districts in South Dakota =

This is a list of public school districts in South Dakota, sorted alphabetically.

It includes schools run by the Bureau of Indian Education but otherwise does not include non-traditional schools and school systems.

All school districts, that is, those organized under South Dakota law, are individual governments. The state does not have school systems dependent on another layer of government.

== Public school districts ==
=== A ===
- Aberdeen School District
- Agar-Blunt-Onida School District
- Alcester-Hudson School District
- Andes Central School District
- Arlington School District
- Armour School District
- Avon School District

=== B ===
- Baltic School District
- Belle Fourche School District
- Bennett County School District
- Beresford School District
- Big Stone City School District
- Bison School District
- Bon Homme School District
- Bowdle School District
- Brandon Valley School District
- Bridgewater School District
- Britton-Hecla School District
- Brookings School District
- Burke School District

=== C ===
- Canistota School District
- Canton School District
- Castlewood School District
- Centerville School District
- Chamberlain School District
- Chester Area School District
- Cheyenne-Eagle Butte School (Eagle Butte School District)
- Clark School District
- Colman-Egan School District
- Colome Consolidated School District
- Corsica School District
- Custer School District

=== D ===
- Dakota Valley School District
- De Smet School District
- Dell Rapids School District
- Deubrook Area School District
- Deuel School District
- Doland School District
- Douglas School District
- Dupree School District

=== E ===
- Eagle Butte School District
- Edgemont School District
- Edmunds Central School District
- Elk Mountain School District
- Elk Point-Jefferson School District
- Elkton School District
- Emery School District
- Estelline School District
- Ethan School District
- Eureka School District

=== F ===
- Faith School District
- Faulkton Area School District
- Flandreau School District
- Florence School District
- Frederick Area School District
- Freeman School District

=== G ===
- Garretson School District
- Gayville-Volin School District
- Gettysburg School District
- Grant-Deuel School District
- Greater Hoyt School District
- Greater Scott School District
- Gregory School District
- Groton Area School District

=== H ===
- Haakon School District
- Hamlin School District
- Hanson School District
- Harding County School District
- Harrisburg School District
- Henry School District
- Herreid School District
- Highmore-Harrold School District
- Hill City School District
- Hitchcock-Tulare School District
- Hot Springs School District
- Hoven School District
- Howard School District
- Hurley School District
- Huron School District

=== I ===
- Ipswich Public School District
- Irene-Wakonda School District
- Iroquois School District
- Isabel School District

=== J ===
- Jones County School District

=== K ===
- Kadoka Area School District
- Kimball School District

=== L ===
- Lake Preston School District
- Langford School District
- Lead-Deadwood School District
- Lemmon School District
- Lennox School District
- Leola School District
- Lyman School District

=== M ===
- Madison Central School District
- Marion School District
- McCook Central School District
- McIntosh School District
- McLaughlin School District
- Meade School District
- Menno School District
- Milbank School District
- Miller Area School District
- Mitchell School District
- Mobridge-Pollock School District
- Montrose School District
- Mount Vernon School District

=== N ===
- New Underwood School District
- Newell School District
- Northwestern Area School District

=== O ===
- Oelrichs School District
- Oldham-Ramona School District

=== P ===
- Parker School District
- Parkston School District
- Pierre School District
- Plankinton School District
- Platte-Geddes School District

=== R ===
- Rapid City Area School District
- Redfield School District
- Rosholt School District
- Roslyn School District
- Rutland School District

=== S ===
- Sanborn Central School District School Website
- Scotland School District
- Selby Area School District
- Shannon County School District
- Sioux Falls School District
- Sioux Valley School District
- Sisseton School District
- Smee School District
- South Central School District
- Spearfish School District
- Stanley County School District
- Stickney School District
- Summit School District

=== T ===
- Tea Area School District
- Timber Lake School District
- Todd County School District
- Tripp-Delmont School District
- Tri-Valley School District

=== V ===
- Vermillion School District
- Viborg School District

=== W ===
- Wagner Community School District
- Wall School District
- Warner School District
- Watertown School District
- Waubay School District
- Waverly School District
- Webster School District
- Wessington Springs School District
- West Central School District
- White Lake School District
- White River School District
- Willow Lake School District
- Wilmot School District
- Winner School District
- Wolsey-Wessington School District
- Wood School District
- Woonsocket School District

=== Y ===
- Yankton School District

== Bureau of Indian Education schools and school systems ==
=== A ===
- American Horse School

=== C ===
- Cheyenne River BIA Schools
- Crazy Horse School
- Crow Creek Sioux Tribal School

=== E ===
- Enemy Swim Day School

=== F ===
- Flandreau Indian School

=== L ===
- Little Wound School System
- Loneman School Corporation
- Lower Brule School System

=== M ===
- Marty Indian School

=== P ===
- Pierre Indian Learning Center
- Pine Ridge School
- Porcupine Contract School

=== R ===
- Rock Creek Day School

=== S ===
- Saint Francis Indian School
- Sitting Bull School

=== T ===
- Takini School
- Tiospa Zina Tribal School
- Tiospaye Topa School System

=== W ===
- Wounded Knee School System
