= South Dakota High School Activities Association =

South Dakota school extracurricular governing body

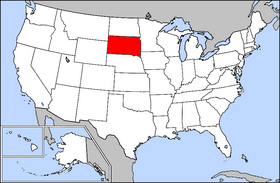
- Abbreviation: SDHSAA
- Formation: 1905
- Type: Volunteer; Non-profit organization
- Legal status: Association
- Purpose: Athletic/Educational
- Headquarters: 804 N. Euclid; Pierre, South Dakota 57501
- Region served: South Dakota
- Members: 181 member high schools
- Executive Director: Dr. Dan Swartos
- Affiliations: National Federation of State High School Associations
- Staff: 9
- Website: sdhsaa.com
- Remarks: (605) 224-9261

South Dakota High School Activities Association governs high school sports and other activities in the U.S. state of South Dakota. The SDHSAA was founded in 1905 and has been a member of the National Federation of State High School Associations since 1923.

== Member Schools ==
School	Location	Mascot	Colors	Affiliation	Enrollment (ADMs)	Conference
Aberdeen Central	Aberdeen	Golden Eagles		Public	848	Eastern South Dakota
Aberdeen Christian	Aberdeen	Knights		Private	51	Lake Region
Aberdeen Roncalli	Aberdeen	Cavaliers		Private	101	Northeast
Alcester-Hudson	Alcester	Cubs		Public	70	Great Plains
Andes Central	Lake Andes	Eagles		Public	35	Great Plains
Arlington	Arlington	Cardinals		Public	54	Dakota Valley
Armour	Armour	Nighthawks		Public	45	Great Plains
Avon	Avon	Pirates		Public	51	Great Plains
Baltic	Baltic	Bulldogs		Public	105	Big East
Belle Fourche	Belle Fourche	Broncs		Public	263	Black Hills
Bennett County	Martin	Warriors		Public	82	Western Great Plains
Beresford	Beresford	Watchdogs		Public	151	Big East
Bison	Bison	Cardinals		Public	28	Little Moreau
Bon Homme	Tyndall	Cavaliers		Public	94	South East
Brandon Valley	Brandon	Lynx		Public	1022	Metro Athletic
Bridgewater-Emery	Bridgewater	Huskies		Public	63	Cornbelt
Britton-Hecla	Britton	Braves		Public	96	Northeast/Eastern Coteau
Brookings	Brookings	Bobcats		Public	697	Eastern South Dakota
Burke	Burke	Cougars		Public	59	Great Plains
Canistota	Canistota	Hawks		Public	68	Cornbelt
Canton	Canton	C-Hawks		Public	194	Dakota 12
Castlewood	Castlewood	Warriors		Public	83	Dakota Valley/Lake Central
Centerville	Centerville	Tornadoes		Public	64	Great Plains
Chamberlain	Chamberlain	Cubs		Public	162	South East
Chester	Chester	Flyers		Public	66	Big East
Cheyenne-Eagle Butte	Eagle Butte	Braves		Public	193	Big Dakota
Clark	Clark	Cyclones		Public	89	Northeast/Lake Central
Colman-Egan	Colman	Hawks		Public	71	Dakota Valley
Colome	Colome	Cowboys		Public	17	Great Plains
Corsica-Stickney	Corsica	Jaguars		Public	57	Great Plains
Crazy Horse	Wanblee	Chiefs		Public	47	
Crow Creek	Stephan	Chieftans		Tribal	88	Big Dakota
Custer	Custer	Wildcats		Public	202	Black Hills
Dakota Christian	Corsica	Cadets		Private	16	Great Plains
Dakota Valley	North Sioux City	Panthers		Public	314	Dakota 12
De Smet	De Smet	Bulldogs		Public	74	Dakota Valley/Lake Central
Dell Rapids	Dell Rapids	Quarriers		Public	208	Dakota 12
Deubrook Area	White	Dolphins		Public	70	Dakota Valley
Deuel	Clear Lake	Cardinals		Public	116	Northeast/Lake Central
Doland	Doland	Wheelers		Public	19	Northeast
Douglas	Box Elder	Patriots		Public	538	Black Hills
Dupree	Dupree	Tigers		Public	51	Little Moreau
Edgemont	Edgemont	Moguls		Public	17	Panhandle (NE)
Edmunds Central	Roscoe	Raiders		Public	48	Lake Region
Elk Mountain	Custer County	Buglers		Public	2	Black Hills
Elk Point-Jefferson	Elk Point	Huskies		Public	140	Dakota 12
Elkton-Lake Benton	Elkton	Elks		Public	96	Dakota Valley
Estelline	Estelline	Redhawks		Public	59	Dakota Valley
Ethan	Ethan	Rustlers		Public	56	South East
Eureka	Eureka	Trojans		Public	42	Yellowstone Trail/Lake Region
Faith	Faith	Longhorns		Public	45	Little Moreau
Faulkton Area	Faulkton	Trojans		Public	61	Lake Region/Big East
Flandreau	Flandreau	Fliers		Public	118	Lake Central
Flandreau Indian	Flandreau	Indians		Public	85	
Florence	Florence	Falcons		Public	76	Eastern Coteau
Frederick Area	Frederick	Titans		Public	36	Lake Region
Freeman	Freeman	Flyers		Public	73	Cornbelt
Garretson	Garretson	Blue Dragons		Public	95	Big East
Gayville-Volin	Gayville	Raiders		Public	59	Great Plains
Gettysburg	Gettysburg	Battlers		Public	45	Yellowstone Trail
Great Plains Lutheran	Watertown	Panthers		Private	116	Eastern Coteau
Gregory	Gregory	Gorillas		Public	68	South East
Groton Area	Groton	Tigers		Public	109	Northeast
Hamlin	Hayti	Chargers		Public	159	Northeast/Lake Central
Hanson	Alexandria	Beavers		Public	84	Cornbelt
Harding County	Buffalo	Ranchers		Public	54	Little Moreau
Harrisburg	Harrisburg	Tigers		Public	1375	Metro Athletic
Henry	Henry	Falcons		Public	34	Eastern Coteau
Herreid	Herreid	Yellowjackets		Public	28	Yellowstone Trail
Highmore-Harrold	Highmore	Pirates		Public	50	281
Hill City	Hill City	Rangers		Public	105	Black Hills
Hitchcock-Tulare	Tulare	Patriots		Public	36	281
Hot Springs	Hot Springs	Bison		Public	161	Black Hills
Hoven	Hoven	Greyhounds		Public	16	Yellowstone Trail
Howard	Howard	Tigers		Public	68	Cornbelt
Huron	Huron	Tigers		Public	563	Eastern South Dakota
Ipswich	Ipswich	Tigers		Public	73	Lake Region
Irene-Wakonda	Irene	Eagles		Public	62	Great Plains
Iroquois	Iroquois	Chiefs		Public	29	Dakota Valley
James Valley Christian	Huron	Vikings		Private	35	281
Jones County	Murdo	Coyotes		Public	33	Western Great Plains
Kadoka Area	Kadoka	Kougars		Public	45	Western Great Plains
Kimball	Kimball	Kiotes		Public	58	
Lake Preston	Lake Preston	Divers		Public	27	281/Dakota Valley
Lakota Tech	Pine Ridge	Tatanka		Public	260	
Langford Area	Langford	Lions		Public	38	Lake Region
Lead-Deadwood	Lead	Golddiggers		Public	113	Black Hills
Lemmon	Lemmon	Cowboys		Public	67	Little Moreau
Lennox	Lennox	Orioles		Public	260	Dakota 12
Leola	Leola	Pirates		Public	24	Lake Region
Little Wound	Kyle	Mustangs		Tribal	151	
Lower Brule	Lower Brule	Sioux		Tribal	56	
Lyman	Presho	Raiders		Public	64	Western Great Plains
Madison	Madison	Bulldogs		Public	250	Dakota 12
Mahpíya Lúta	Pine Ridge	Crusaders		Private	142	Black Hills
Marion	Marion	Bears		Public	39	Great Plains
Marty	Marty	Braves		Tribal	37	
McCook Central	Salem	Fighting Cougars		Public	75	Big East
McCrossan Ranch	Sioux Falls	Wranglers		Private	36	
McIntosh	McIntosh	Tigers		Public	21	Little Moreau
McLaughlin	McLaughlin	Mustangs		Public	71	Little Moreau
Menno	Menno	Wolves		Public	43	Cornbelt
Milbank	Milbank	Bulldogs		Public	223	Northeast
Miller	Miller	Rustlers		Public	83	South East
Mitchell	Mitchell	Kernels		Public	587	Eastern South Dakota
Mitchell Christian	Mitchell	Golden Eagles		Private	34	
Mobridge-Pollock	Mobridge	Tigers		Public	114	Northeast
Montrose	Montrose	Fighting Irish		Public	47	Big East
Mount Vernon	Mount Vernon	Titans		Public	45	South East
New Underwood	New Underwood	Tigers		Public	70	Western Great Plains
Newell	Newell	Irrigators		Public	38	Little Moreau
Northwestern	Mellette	Wildcats		Public	61	Lake Region
O'Gorman	Sioux Falls	Knights		Private	468	Metro Athletic
Oelrichs	Oelrichs	Tigers		Public	24	
Oldham-Ramona-Rutland	Ramona	Raiders		Public	31	Dakota Valley
Parker	Parker	PHeasants		Public	101	Big East
Parkston	Parkston	Trojans		Public	89	South East
Philip	Philip	Scotties		Public	80	Western Great Plains
Pierre T.F. Riggs	Pierre	Governors		Public	598	Eastern South Dakota
Pine Ridge	Pine Ridge	Thorpes		Tribal	141	
Plankinton	Plankinton	Titans		Public	53	South East
Platte-Geddes	Platte	Panthers		Public	100	South East
Rapid City Central	Rapid City	Cobblers		Public	1352	
Rapid City Christian	Rapid City	Comets		Private	161	Black Hills
Rapid City Stevens	Rapid City	Raiders		Public	1276	
Redfield	Redfield	Pheasants		Public	103	Northeast
Rosholt	Rosholt	Tigers		Public	46	Eastern Coteau
Sanborn Central	Forestburg	Blackhawks		Public	26	281
School for the Blind/VI	Aberdeen	Pioneers		Public	3	
Scotland	Scotland	Highlanders		Public	41	Great Plains
Selby Area	Selby	Lions		Public	39	
Sioux Falls Christian	Sioux Falls	Chargers		Private	347	Dakota 12
Sioux Falls Jefferson	Sioux Falls	Cavaliers		Public	1206	Metro Athletic
Sioux Falls Lincoln	Sioux Falls	Patriots		Public	1354	Metro Athletic
Sioux Falls Lutheran	Sioux Falls	Eagles		Private	73	
Sioux Falls Roosevelt	Sioux Falls	Rough Riders		Public	1243	Metro Athletic
Sioux Falls Washington	Sioux Falls	Warriors		Public	1189	Metro Athletic
Sioux Valley	Volga	Cossacks		Public	157	Lake Central/Big East
Sisseton	Sisseton	Redmen		Public	192	Northeast
Spearfish	Spearfish	Spartans		Public	517	Black Hills
St. Francis Indian	St. Francis	Warriors		Tribal	137	
St. Mary's	Dell Rapids	Cardinals		Private	55	Dakota Valley
St. Thomas More	Rapid City	Cavaliers		Private	128	Black Hills
Stanley County	Fort Pierre	Buffaloes		Public	97	Big Dakota
Sturgis Brown	Sturgis	Scoopers		Public	560	Black Hills
Sully Buttes	Onida	Chargers		Public	52	Yellowstone Trail
Summit	Summit	Eagles		Public	31	Eastern Coteau
Sunshine Bible Academy	Miller	Crusaders		Private	27	281
Takini	Howes	Skyhawks		Tribal	24	
Tea Area	Tea	Titans		Public	537	Metro Athletic
Timber Lake	Timber Lake	Panthers		Public	68	Little Moreau
Tiospa Zina	Agency Village	Wambdi		Tribal	74	Northeast
Tiospaye Topa	La Plant	Thunderhawks		Tribal	26	
Todd County	Mission	Falcons		Public	260	Big Dakota
Tri-Valley	Colton	Mustangs		Public	220	Dakota 12
Tripp-Delmont	Tripp	Nighthawks		Public	22	Great Plains
Vermillion	Vermillion	Tanagers		Public	282	Dakota 12
Viborg-Hurley	Viborg	Cougars		Public	83	Cornbelt
Wagner	Wagner	Red Raiders		Public	134	South East
Wakpala	Wakpala	Hunkpapa		Tribal	20	Yellowstone Trail
Wall	Wall	Eagles		Public	63	Western Great Plains
Warner	Warner	Monarchs		Public	70	Lake Region
Watertown	Watertown	Arrows		Public	805	Eastern South Dakota
Waubay	Waubay	Dragons		Public	40	Eastern Coteau
Waverly-South Shore	Waverly	Coyotes		Public	67	Eastern Coteau
Webster Area	Webster	Bearcats		Public	111	Northeast
Wessington Springs	Wessington Springs	Spartans		Public	63	281
West Central	Hartford	Trojans		Public	293	Dakota 12
White Lake	White Lake	WiLdKats		Public	22	
White River	White River	Tigers		Public	65	Western Great Plains
Willow Lake	Willow Lake	Cyclones		Public	50	Northeast
Wilmot	Wilmot	Wolves		Public	40	Eastern Coteau
Winner	Winner	Warriors		Public	146	South East
Wolsey-Wessington	Wolsey	Warbirds		Public	66	281
Woonsocket	Woonsocket	Blackhawks		Public	47	South East
Yankton	Yankton	Bucks/Gazelles		Public	603	Eastern South Dakota

=== Current Cooperatives ===
Name	Participating Schools	Mascot	Colors	Sports
Aberdeen Central	Aberdeen Central, Aberdeen Roncalli	Golden Eagles		Cheer, Dance, Gymnastics, Boys & Girls Soccer, Boys & Girls Wrestling
Aberdeen Roncalli	Aberdeen Roncalli, Aberdeen Christian	Cavaliers		Football, Girls Golf, Boys & Girls Tennis
AC/DC	Andes Central, Dakota Christian	Thunder		Boys & Girls Basketball, Boys & Girls Cross Country, Boys & Girls Golf, Boys & Girls Track & Field, Volleyball, Boys & Girls Wrestling
BAH	Beresford, Alcester-Hudson	Rams		Boys & Girls Wrestling
Bon Homme	Bon Homme, Avon	Cavaliers		Boys Wrestling
Bon Homme	Bon Homme, Scotland, Avon	Patriots		Girls Wrestling
BEE	Bridgewater-Emery, Ethan	Seahawks		Football
Britton-Hecla	Britton-Hecla, Langford Area	Braves		Gymnastics, Boys & Girls Wrestling
B-G	Burke, Gregory, Colome	Storm		Boys & Girls Wrestling
CEB/D/TT	Cheyenne-Eagle Butte, Dupree, Tiospaye Topa	Braves		Boys & Girls Wrestling
CWL	Clark, Willow Lake	Cyclones		Boys & Girls Basketball, Boys & Girls Cross Country, Football, Boys & Girls Golf, Softball, Boys & Girls Track & Field, Volleyball, Boys & Girls Wrestling
Custer	Custer, Elk Mountain	Wildcats		Boys & Girls Basketball, Boys & Girls Cross Country, Football, Boys & Girls Golf, Boys Soccer, Boys & Girls Track & Field, Volleyball
Dell Rapids	Dell Rapids, St. Mary's	Quarriers		Softball, Boys & Girls Wrestling
Deuel	Deuel, Hamlin	Cardinals		Gymnastics
DDA	Deuel, Deubrook Area	Cardinals		Boys & Girls Wrestling
DNU	Douglas, New Underwood	Patriots		Boys & Girls Soccer
Estelline/Hendricks	Estelline, Hendricks (MN)	Redhawks		Boys & Girls Basketball, Boys & Girls Cross Country, Football, Boys & Girls Golf, Gymnastics, Boys & Girls Track & Field, Volleyball
E-P	Ethan, Parkston			Boys & Girls Cross Country, Softball, Boys & Girls Track & Field, Girls Wrestling
Flandreau	Flandreau, Colman-Egan	Fliers		Boys & Girls Wrestling
Florence/Henry	Florence, Henry	Falcons		Boys & Girls Basketball, Cheer, Boys & Girls Cross Country, Football, Boys & Girls Golf, Softball, Boys & Girls Track & Field, Volleyball
Garretson	Garretson, Dell Rapids	Blue Dragons		Girls Soccer
Gregory	Gregory, Colome	Gorillas		Boys & Girls Basketball, Cheer, Dance, Boys & Girls Cross Country, Football, Boys & Girls Golf, Softball, Boys & Girls Track & Field, Volleyball
Groton Area	Groton Area, Langford Area	Tigers		Football
Groton Area	Groton Area, Doland	Tigers		Boys & Girls Wrestling
H-C	Hamlin, Castlewood	Chargers		Boys & Girls Wrestling
HCB	Harding County, Bison	Ranchers		Football
HSA	Herreid, Selby Area	Wolverines		Boys & Girls Basketball, Boys & Girls Cross Country, Football, Boys & Girls Track & Field, Volleyball
Hitchcock-Tulare	Hitchcock-Tulare, Doland	Patriots		Boys & Girls Basketball, Boys & Girls Cross Country, Football, Boys & Girls Track & Field, Volleyball
Ipswich/Leola	Ipswich, Leola	Tigers		Boys & Girls Wrestling
ILP	Iroquois, Lake Preston	Sharks		Boys & Girls Basketball, Cheer, Boys & Girls Cross Country, Football, Boys & Girls Golf, Boys & Girls Track & Field, Volleyball
KWL	Kimball, White Lake	WiLdKats		Boys & Girls Basketball, Boys & Girls Cross Country, Football, Boys & Girls Golf, Gymnastics, Boys & Girls Track & Field, Volleyball
KWLPG	Kimball, White Lake, Platte-Geddes	WiLdKats		Boys & Girls Wrestling
Kingsbury County	Arlington, De Smet, Iroquois, Lake Preston	Knights		Boys & Girls Wrestling
Kingsbury County	De Smet, Iroquois, Lake Preston	Knights		Softball
Lemmon/McIntosh	Lemmon, McIntosh	Cowboys		Football
LFA	Leola, Frederick Area	Titans		Boys & Girls Basketball, Boys & Girls Cross Country, Football, Volleyball
Little Wound	Little Wound, Crazy Horse	Mustangs		Boys & Girls Wrestling
Lyman	Lyman, Jones County	Raiders		Cheer, Boys & Girls Wrestling
Madison	Madison, Oldham-Ramona-Rutland	Bulldogs		Boys & Girls Wrestling
MCM	McCook Central, Montrose	Fighting Cougars		Boys & Girls Basketball, Boys & Girls Cross Country, Football, Boys & Girls Golf, Softball, Boys & Girls Track & Field, Volleyball, Boys & Girls Wrestling
Milbank Area	Milbank, Wilmot, Ortonville (MN)	Bulldogs		Gymnastics
MHH	Miller, Highmore-Harrold	Rustlers		Football
MHH	Miller, Highmore-Harrold	Bandits		Boys & Girls Wrestling
Mitchell	Mitchell, Mitchell Christian	Kernels		Football, Gymnastics
MVP	Mount Vernon, Plankinton	Titans		Boys & Girls Basketball, Cheer, Boys & Girls Cross Country, Football, Boys & Girls Golf, Softball, Boys & Girls Track & Field, Volleyball
MVPCS	Mount Vernon, Plankinton, Corsica-Stickney	Titans		Boys & Girls Wrestling
North Central	Eureka, Edmunds Central	Thunder		Boys & Girls Basketball, Boys & Girls Cross Country, Football, Boys & Girls Golf, Boys & Girls Track & Field, Volleyball
Parker/Marion	Parker, Marion	Cyclones		Boys & Girls Basketball, Boys & Girls Cross Country, Football, Boys & Girls Golf, Boys Soccer, Softball, Boys & Girls Track & Field, Volleyball, Boys & Girls Wrestling
Parkston	Parkston, Ethan	Trojans		Girls Wrestling
PEH	Parkston, Ethan, Hanson	Royals		Gymnastics
PKAW	Philip, Kadoka Area, Wall	Badlands Brawlers		Boys & Girls Wrestling
PG/DC	Platte-Geddes, Dakota Christian	Black Panthers		Cheer, Dance
Redfield	Redfield, Hitchcock-Tulare	Pheasants		Boys & Girls Wrestling
SCW	Sanborn Central, Woonsocket	Blackhawks		Boys & Girls Basketball, Boys & Girls Cross Country, Boys & Girls Golf, Boys & Girls Track & Field, Volleyball
Scotland/Menno	Scotland, Menno	Trappers		Boys & Girls Basketball, Football, Boys & Girls Golf, Softball, Boys & Girls Track & Field, Boys Wrestling
STMRCC	St. Thomas More, Rapid City Christian	Cavaliers		Boys & Girls Soccer, Boys & Girls Wrestling
Sturgis Brown	Sturgis Brown, Newell, Lead-Deadwood	Scoopers		Boys & Girls Soccer
TCWR	Todd County, White River	Falcons		Boys & Girls Wrestling
Tri-State	Rosholt, Fairmount (ND), Campbell-Tintah (MN)	Tigers		Boys & Girls Cross Country, Boys & Girls Track & Field
TDA	Tripp-Delmont, Armour	Nighthawks		Boys & Girls Basketball, Boys & Girls Cross Country, Boys & Girls Golf, Boys & Girls Track & Field, Volleyball
TDA/ACDC	Tripp-Delmont, Armour, Andes Central, Dakota Christian	Thunderhawks		Football
WBH	Wagner, Bon Homme	Red Raiders		Gymnastics
Warner/Northwestern	Warner, Northwestern	Wild Monarchs		Boys & Girls Wrestling
Waubay/Summit	Waubay, Summit	Mustangs		Boys & Girls Basketball, Boys & Girls Cross Country, Football, Boys & Girls Golf, Boys & Girls Track & Field, Volleyball
Webster Area	Webster Area, Waubay	Bearcats		Boys & Girls Wrestling
WS/W/W-W	Wessington Springs, Woonsocket, Wolsey-Wessington	Warhawks		Boys & Girls Wrestling
W/WS/SC	Woonsocket, Wessington Springs, Sanborn Central	Bucks		Football
