= Garretson =

Garretson may refer to:

- Garretson (surname)
- Garretson, South Dakota, United States
- Garretson School District, South Dakota, United States
- Garretson W. Gibson (1832–1910), President of Liberia
