= Øien =

Øien or Oien is a surname. Notable people with the surname include:

- Anfinn Øien (1922−2018), Norwegian organist and music teacher
- Arne Øien (1928–1998), Norwegian economist and politician
- Bjørg Løhner Øien (1928–2015), Norwegian figure skater
- Hemming O. Oien (1926–2010), American politician
- Hildur Horn Øien (born 1940), Norwegian politician
- Jørn Øien (born 1968), Norwegian jazz pianist and keyboard player
- Justin Oien (born 1995), American cyclist
- Michael Oien (born 1981), American musician and composer
- Per Øien (1937–2016), Norwegian flautist
