= Garretson (surname) =

Garretson is a surname and patronymic name meaning "son of Garret". Notable people with the surname include:

- Austin B. Garretson (1856–1931), an American labor leader who became president of the Order of Railway Conductors.
- Bob Garretson (1933–2025), American racing driver
- Darell Garretson (1932–2008), American basketball referee
- John Wesley Garretson (1812-1895), a surveyor who mapped large areas of Askansas and New Mexico
- Katy Garretson, American television director
- Mary Welleck Garretson (1896–1971), American geologist and paleontologist
- Ron Garretson (born 1958), American professional basketball referee
- A. S. Garretson Founder of Garretson, South Dakota and Corona, California

== See also ==
- Garretson House (disambiguation), historic houses
