= James Valley Christian School =

Coordinates: 44.38736°N 98.21419°W

Location
- 1550 Dakota Ave N Huron, SD 57350; U.S.

Information
- Type: Christian School
- Religious affiliation: Inter-denominational
- Established: September 3, 1957
- School district: Huron
- Superintendent: Dr. Jeremy Zajicek
- Principal: Cindy Niederbaumer
- Grades: PreK–12
- Enrollment: ~220
- Student to teacher ratio: 1:11
- Hours in school day: 7 hrs 15 min
- Campus: Suburban
- Colors: Black, Gold
- Athletics conference: 281 Conference, (named after US Hwy 281)
- Mascot: Vikings
- Nickname: JVCS
- Accreditation: South Dakota Board of Education and Association of Christian Schools International
- Website: jvcs.org

James Valley Christian School is a private non-denominational Christian school in Huron, South Dakota. The school is a member of the Association of Christian Schools International.

== History ==
James Valley Christian School first opened their doors in the fall of 1956 outside of Huron, South Dakota by individuals who desired Christian education in their area. The school campus was built in the James River Valley on the same campus as Byron Bible Camp. In 1972, the original building burned down and a new building was built on the same campus. On April 6, 1997, when the dikes on the James River failed the school campus along with Bryon Bible camp flooded; water in the school reached a height of between 5 and 7 feet (1.5 and 2.1 m). For the next few years, school was held in the Huron Middle School building, prior to its demolition. The school moved into the current building in August 2000. In early 2018, JVCS, broke ground on an auditorium and an auxiliary gym that finished sometime in 2020.

== Extracurricular ==
James Valley Christian School is a member of the South Dakota High School Activities Association. It has a concert band, a pep band, and a choir program. The Oral Interpretation Team and One-Act play has had many years of success. Sports include soccer, volleyball, cross country, basketball, cheerleading, track and golf.

== Notable alumni ==
- Ron Tschetter, Peace Corps director Sept 2006–2008; Class of 1959, the first graduating class
- Sally Lott, Missionary in Africa; class of 1973
