= Sisseton High School =

Location
- 516 8th Avenue West; Sisseton, South Dakota 57262; United States; 45°39′53″N 97°03′46″W

Information
- Type: Public high school
- School district: Sisseton School District 54-2
- NCES District ID: 4600053
- Superintendent: Michael Neil Terhune
- NCES School ID: 460005301239
- Principal: Jim Frederick
- Teaching staff: 17.70 (FTE)
- Enrollment: 296 (2022-2023)
- Campus type: Rural
- Colors: Red and black
- Athletics conference: SDHSAA NE-A
- Team name: Redmen
- Website: www.sisseton.k12.sd.us/o/shs

Sisseton High School (SHS) is a public high school in Sisseton, South Dakota and the only high school in the Sisseton, South Dakota school district. The school reported 250 students for the 2014-2015 school year. The school's athletic teams play as part of the SDHSAA Northeast Conference as the "Redmen".

In 2010 a student was arrested for stockpiling weapons and bomb-making materials in his bedroom. He had also written about wanting to blow up the school. He was sentenced to 10 years in prison in 2011.

Veblen High School was merged with SHS at some point in the past.

== Redmen team name ==
For the 2014-2015 school year, of the 250 students, 110 were Native American. Disagreements and controversy among Native American students and community members over the school's use of a Native American mascot has received media attention.

In 2015 a group of girls' basketball players who were students of the nearby school Tiospa Zina Tribal School wore shirts saying "Not your Mascot" to a game at SHS. The students had previously attended SHS but had later transferred to the tribal school in Agency Village on the Lake Traverse Reservation. Several of the students' grandparents had previously protested the mascot in the 90s. The schools superintendent Stephen Schulte has said that there is support for the name. The T-shirts sparked at least one fight.

In September 2016, the school board voted to remove all native imagery from Homecoming from that year forward, although the school would continue to use the name. The decision was opposed by the school's student homecoming committee.
