= Lyman High School (South Dakota) =

School in Presho, South Dakota, United States

Coordinates: 43°54′35″N 100°03′48″W

Location
- 201 South Birch Avenue; Presho, (Lyman County), South Dakota 57568; United States

Information
- Type: Public high school
- Principal: Michael Uthe
- Teaching staff: 9.91 (FTE)
- Enrollment: 80 (2024-2025)
- Student to teacher ratio: 8.07
- Colors: Red, black and white
- Fight song: "Illinois Loyalty"
- Nickname: Raiders

Lyman High School, located in Presho, South Dakota, is the only high school in Lyman County. It is also the only high school in Lyman School District 42–1, which also includes two elementary schools and a middle school. Lyman High School's athletic teams are nicknamed the "Raiders".

Lyman High School includes most of Lyman County including the towns of Vivian, Presho, Kennebec, Reliance, and Lower Brule.

== See also ==
- List of high schools in South Dakota
