= Hofmeister House =

Historic house in South Dakota, United States

- U.S. National Register of Historic Places
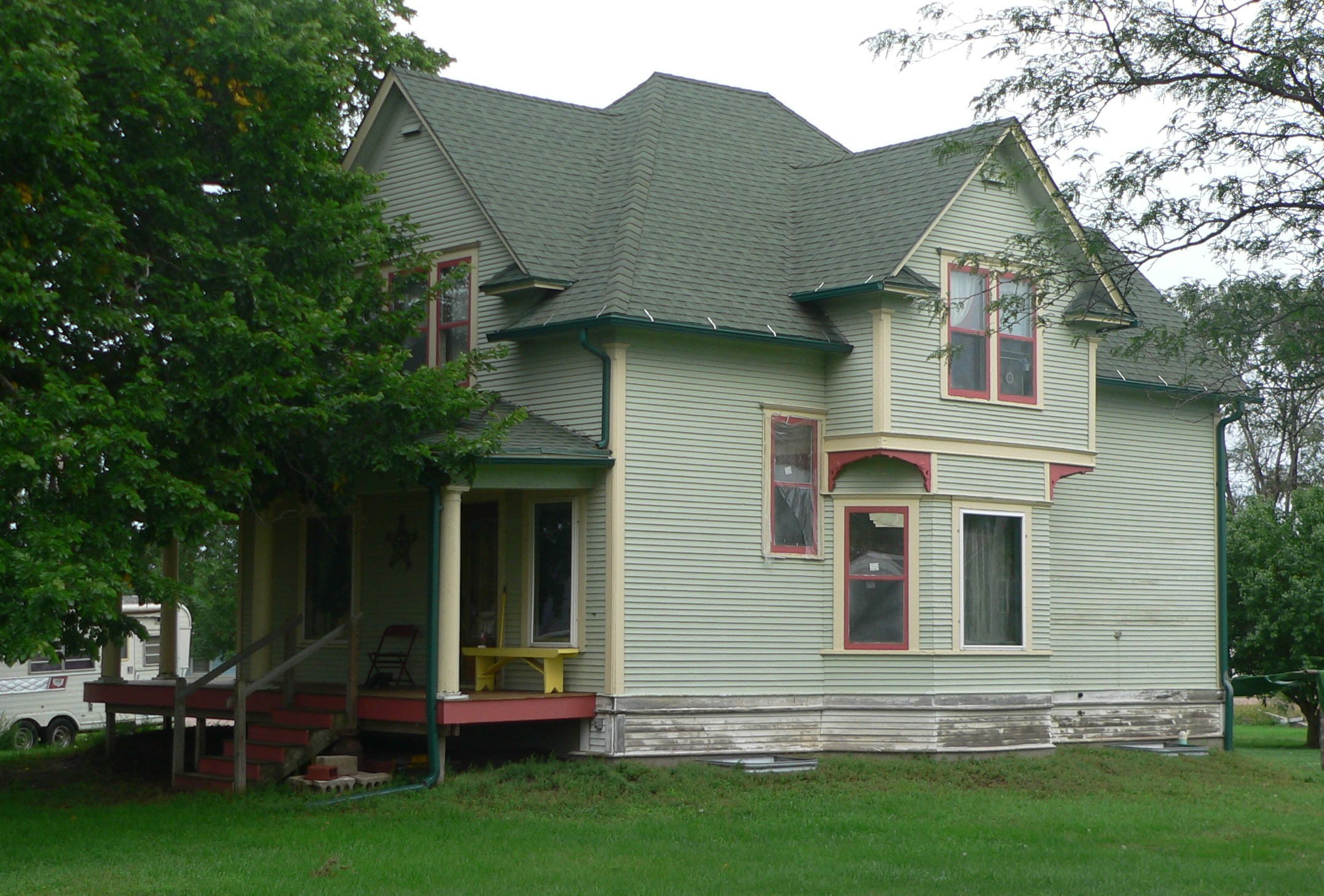

- Location within South Dakota Location within the United States
- Location: 209 E. First St., White Lake, South Dakota
- Coordinates: 43.726432°N 98.711535°W
- Built: 1912
- Architectural style: Queen Anne
- NRHP reference No.: 06001307
- Added to NRHP: January 23, 2007

The Hofmeister House is a house in White Lake, South Dakota. It was built in the Queen Anne style by Simon Pexa in 1912. It was added to the National Register of Historic Places in 2007.

It has a wraparound porch. It was deemed notable as "a fine example of a Queen Anne style house built during the early 20th century in South Dakota."
