= Harrisburg, South Dakota =

- City
- City of Harrisburg
- Motto: Great Things Are Happening
- Location in Lincoln County and the state of South Dakota
- Coordinates: 43°26′17″N 96°44′15″W
- Country: United States
- State: South Dakota
- County: Lincoln
- Founded: 1873
- Started: August 1, 1879

Government
  - Type: Aldermanic government

Area
  - Total: 4.769 sq mi (12.352 km^{2})
  - Land: 4.769 sq mi (12.352 km^{2})
  - Water: 0 sq mi (0.000 km^{2})
- Elevation: 1,424 ft (434 m)
  - Density: 1,434.3/sq mi (553.78/km^{2})
- Time zone: UTC–6 (Central (CST))
  - Summer (DST): UTC–5 (CDT)
- ZIP Code: 57032
- Area code: 605
- FIPS code: 46-27260
- GNIS feature ID: 1267411
- Website: harrisburgsd.gov

Harrisburg is a city in Lincoln County, South Dakota, United States and is a suburb of Sioux Falls. The population was 6,732 at the 2020 census. Rapid growth in Lincoln County has led city officials to estimate Harrisburg’s population at approximately 12,000 as recent as February 2026.

== History ==
Before the railroad was built through Lincoln County, a stagecoach brought mail to the Johnson Harris Homestead located on Nine Mile Creek in Dayton Township. Johnson Harris named the post office Harrisburg in honor of himself.

The history of Harrisburg started August 1, 1879, when the first train came rolling through the territory. The train went from Sioux City, Iowa, to Sioux Falls, South Dakota. The post office was moved to the Emory J. Darling Homestead, 1 mile south of what is now Harrisburg. The post office was called Salina in honor of Mrs. Jim Stillwell, an early settler and a highly respected teacher. In 1882 the name was changed to Springdale.

Finally in 1890, the depot was moved to its present site. The post office took back its original name and the town of Harrisburg was born.

One of the many early businesses in Harrisburg was the State Bank, circa 1901–1945. The bank's building is still located in its original spot at 101 Railroad Ave. The bank itself was built in 1899 and completely restored in 2006 by its current owner RISE, Inc. is a construction management/structural engineering firm.

Much mystery surrounds the old bank building, including whether or not the infamous bandit John Dillinger stopped to rob it. According to popular legend, after Dillinger robbed the bank, he fired a round into the teller counter as a reminder not to follow him out. That bullet hole remains there today.

== Government ==
The city of Harrisburg is led by an aldermanic form of government. Mayoral elections occur every four years. City council seats are contested every three years; However, not all of the council members are elected in the same year. The council consists of four members elected to represent two wards. The council member position is designed to be part-time.

== Geography ==
According to the United States Census Bureau, the city has a total area of 4.769 square miles (12.35 km^{2}), all land.

Harrisburg is an estimated 2.7 miles from the southern edge of Sioux Falls.

== Demographics ==
Historical population
Census	Pop.	Note	%±
1910	164		—
1920	193		17.7%
1930	205		6.2%
1940	241		17.6%
1950	274		13.7%
1960	313		14.2%
1970	338		8.0%
1980	558		65.1%
1990	727		30.3%
2000	958		31.8%
2010	4,089		326.8%
2020	6,732		64.6%
2024 (est.)	10,203		51.6%
U.S. Decennial Census; 2020 Census

=== 2020 census ===
As of the 2020 census, there were 6,732 people, 2,268 households, and 1,752 families residing in the city. The population density was 1,822.4 inhabitants per square mile (703.6/km^{2}).

There were 2,268 households in Harrisburg, of which 54.6% had children under the age of 18 living in them. Of all households, 60.5% were married-couple households, 12.5% were households with a male householder and no spouse or partner present, and 17.9% were households with a female householder and no spouse or partner present. About 16.4% of all households were made up of individuals and 4.1% had someone living alone who was 65 years of age or older.

There were 2,399 housing units, of which 5.5% were vacant. The homeowner vacancy rate was 1.5% and the rental vacancy rate was 12.8%.

The median age was 29.1 years. 36.5% of residents were under the age of 18 and 5.0% of residents were 65 years of age or older. For every 100 females there were 98.4 males, and for every 100 females age 18 and over there were 96.3 males age 18 and over.

98.8% of residents lived in urban areas, while 1.2% lived in rural areas.

Racial composition as of the 2020 census
Race	Number	Percent
White	6,200	92.1%
Black or African American	75	1.1%
American Indian and Alaska Native	42	0.6%
Asian	19	0.3%
Native Hawaiian and Other Pacific Islander	0	0.0%
Some other race	59	0.9%
Two or more races	337	5.0%
Hispanic or Latino (of any race)	207	3.1%

=== 2010 census ===
As of the 2010 census, there were 4,089 people, 1,423 households, and 1,133 families residing in the city. The population density was 1,647.6 inhabitants per square mile (636.1/km^{2}). There were 1,507 housing units at an average density of 607.7 per square mile (234.6/km^{2}). The racial makeup of the city was 96.8% White, 0.5% African American, 0.2% Native American, 0.3% Asian, 0.2% from other races, and 2.0% from two or more races. Hispanic or Latino of any race were 1.3% of the population.

There were 1,423 households, of which 53.5% had children under the age of 18 living with them, 65.0% were married couples living together, 10.3% had a female householder with no husband present, 4.3% had a male householder with no wife present, and 20.4% were non-families. 13.3% of all households were made up of individuals, and 1% had someone living alone who was 65 years of age or older. The average household size was 2.87 and the average family size was 3.18.

The median age in the city was 27.1 years. 34% of residents were under the age of 18; 8.2% were between the ages of 18 and 24; 42.6% were from 25 to 44; 13.1% were from 45 to 64; and 2% were 65 years of age or older. The gender makeup of the city was 49.0% male and 51.0% female.

== Education ==
The Harrisburg School District currently has one high school divided into two campuses, three middle schools, and seven elementary schools. Due to a mismatch in the boundaries between school districts and municipal boundaries, most of the schools are located within Sioux Falls. There are approximately 4,800 students in the district.

=== High school ===
- Harrisburg main campus (grades 10 through 12)
- Harrisburg Freshman Academy - in Sioux Falls

=== Middle schools ===
- East - in Sioux Falls
- North - in Sioux Falls
- South

=== Elementary schools ===
- Adventure
- Endeavor - in Sioux Falls
- Explorer - in Sioux Falls
- Freedom
- Horizon - in Sioux Falls
- Journey - in Sioux Falls
- Liberty

Adventure Elementary, Freedom Elementary, and Liberty Elementary are located inside Harrisburg city limits. In 2008, a new sports complex and stadium were built at the new high school on the west side of Harrisburg, along with construction of soccer fields and tennis courts on the north side of the Harrisburg High School campus. Harrisburg is in SDHSAA class AA in athletics and would compete with the five other class Sioux Falls metro schools, but those Sioux Falls schools moved up to AAA at the same time. Harrisburg has competed in class AAA football since the 2019 season.
