= Hemming O. Oien =

American politician

Member of the South Dakota House of Representatives
- In office 1979–1988

Personal details
- Born: Hemming Olaf Oien; July 15, 1926 Baltic, South Dakota, U.S.
- Died: August 19, 2010 (aged 84) Sioux Falls, South Dakota, U.S.
- Party: Republican
- Education: South Dakota State College; Northwstern College of Chiropractic

Hemming Olaf Oien (July 15, 1926 – August 19, 2010) was an American politician. He served as a Republican member of the South Dakota House of Representatives.

== Life and career ==
Oien was born in Minnehaha County, South Dakota, the son of Norwegian immigrants. He attended South Dakota State College, earning his bachelor's degree. He also attended Northwstern College of Chiropractic, earning his doctorate degree.

Oien served in the South Dakota House of Representatives from 1979 to 1988.

Oien died on August 19, 2010, at the age of 84.
