= Mellette, South Dakota =

- City
- Location in Spink County and the state of South Dakota
- Coordinates: 45°09′16″N 98°29′54″W
- Country: United States
- State: South Dakota
- County: Spink
- Incorporated: 1908

Area
  - Total: 0.25 sq mi (0.66 km^{2})
  - Land: 0.25 sq mi (0.66 km^{2})
  - Water: 0 sq mi (0.00 km^{2})
- Elevation: 1,299 ft (396 m)

Population (2020)
  - Total: 199
  - Density: 775.9/sq mi (299.57/km^{2})
- Time zone: UTC-6 (Central (CST))
  - Summer (DST): UTC-5 (CDT)
- ZIP code: 57461
- Area code: 605
- FIPS code: 46-41860
- GNIS feature ID: 1267473
- Website: cityofmellette.com

Mellette is a city in Spink County, South Dakota, United States. The population was 199 at the 2020 census.

Mellette was laid out in 1881, and named in honor of Governor Arthur C. Mellette.

== Geography ==
According to the United States Census Bureau, the city has a total area of 0.26 square miles (0.67 km^{2}), all land.

== Public Education ==
Northwestern Area School District #56-7 is located in the city of Mellette. Northwestern serves northern Spink County, and has a K-12 enrollment of 260 students. Northwestern Wildcat athletics participates under the SDHSAA Class B, and has a combined total of 15 state titles.

== Demographics ==
Historical population
| Census | Pop. | Note | %± |
|---|---|---|---|
| 1890 | 241 | | — |
| 1900 | 354 | | 46.9% |
| 1910 | 472 | | 33.3% |
| 1920 | 507 | | 7.4% |
| 1930 | 363 | | −28.4% |
| 1940 | 332 | | −8.5% |
| 1950 | 250 | | −24.7% |
| 1960 | 208 | | −16.8% |
| 1970 | 199 | | −4.3% |
| 1980 | 192 | | −3.5% |
| 1990 | 184 | | −4.2% |
| 2000 | 248 | | 34.8% |
| 2010 | 210 | | −15.3% |
| 2020 | 199 | | −5.2% |
U.S. Decennial Census

=== 2010 census ===
As of the census of 2010, there were 210 people, 90 households, and 58 families residing in the city. The population density was 807.7 inhabitants per square mile (311.9/km^{2}). There were 100 housing units at an average density of 384.6 per square mile (148.5/km^{2}). The racial makeup of the city was 97.1% White, 0.5% Native American, and 2.4% from two or more races. Hispanic or Latino of any race were 0.5% of the population.

There were 90 households, of which 27.8% had children under the age of 18 living with them, 50.0% were married couples living together, 11.1% had a female householder with no husband present, 3.3% had a male householder with no wife present, and 35.6% were non-families. 31.1% of all households were made up of individuals, and 14.5% had someone living alone who was 65 years of age or older. The average household size was 2.33 and the average family size was 2.95.

The median age in the city was 40 years. 24.3% of residents were under the age of 18; 7.6% were between the ages of 18 and 24; 22.9% were from 25 to 44; 31% were from 45 to 64; and 14.3% were 65 years of age or older. The gender makeup of the city was 53.3% male and 46.7% female.

=== 2000 census ===
As of the census of 2000, there were 248 people, 90 households, and 63 families residing in the city. The population density was 948.7 inhabitants per square mile (366.3/km^{2}). There were 99 housing units at an average density of 378.7 per square mile (146.2/km^{2}). The racial makeup of the city was 98.79% White, 0.40% from other races, and 0.81% from two or more races. Hispanic or Latino of any race were 0.40% of the population.

There were 90 households, out of which 43.3% had children under the age of 18 living with them, 58.9% were married couples living together, 4.4% had a female householder with no husband present, and 30.0% were non-families. 27.8% of all households were made up of individuals, and 15.6% had someone living alone who was 65 years of age or older. The average household size was 2.76 and the average family size was 3.44.

In the city, the population was spread out, with 35.5% under the age of 18, 5.6% from 18 to 24, 26.2% from 25 to 44, 18.1% from 45 to 64, and 14.5% who were 65 years of age or older. The median age was 34 years. For every 100 females, there were 100.0 males. For every 100 females age 18 and over, there were 107.8 males.

The median income for a household in the city was $34,107, and the median income for a family was $34,500. Males had a median income of $30,521 versus $19,375 for females. The per capita income for the city was $11,467. About 10.9% of families and 12.6% of the population were below the poverty line, including 9.9% of those under the age of eighteen and 28.6% of those 65 or over.
