= Sioux Falls New Technology High School =

Location
- 2205 N. Career Ave. Sioux Falls, South Dakota 57107
- 43°34′06″N 96°46′55″W

Information
- School type: Project Based Learning, Public
- Motto: Trust, Respect, Responsibility, and Excellence
- Established: 2010
- Closed: 2021 (Moved Project-Based Learning model to Jefferson High School)
- School district: Sioux Falls School District
- Director: Dolly Anderson
- Teaching staff: 18.52 (FTE)
- Grades: 9th-12th
- Enrollment: 327 (2018-19)
- Student to teacher ratio: 17.66
- Colors: Green and Black
- Team name: Titans
- Website: School website

Sioux Falls New Technology High School was a high school in Sioux Falls, South Dakota. It prioritized small classes and project-based learning. The school operated from 2010 to 2021, when it was absorbed into the new Jefferson High School.
