= Crow Creek Tribal School =

School in Stephan, South Dakota

Coordinates: 44.2484°N 99.4606°W

- Stephan, South Dakota; United States

Information
- Type: Tribal K-12 school

Crow Creek Tribal School (CCTS) is a tribal K-12 school in Stephan, South Dakota, on the Hunkpati Sioux Reservation. It is associated with the Bureau of Indian Education (BIE), and covers grades K-12. As of 2021 it had about 600 students.

The school has a dormitory facility for students in grades 7-12, including those who live in any geographic distance from the school.

== History ==
Prior to losing its gymnasium the school had about 300 students, but after the gymnasium was decommissioned enrollment declined.

In 2003 the dormitory burned down. The building was not insured although the objects inside were.

In Summer 2008 enrollment was 120. In 2008, multiple former employees were sentenced and/or awaiting sentencing for federal criminal charges, causing turmoil at the school. The school was scheduled to get a gymnasium in 2009.

== Student body ==
The school enrolls students from Fort Thompson and from Native American reservations in South Dakota and other states.
