= Baltic, South Dakota =

- City
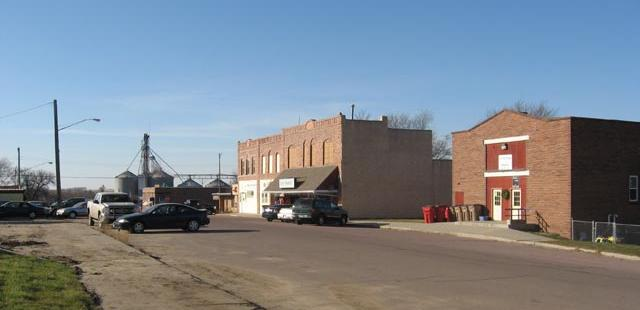
- Saint Olaf Avenue in Baltic, November 2009
- Motto: "Begin Building Tomorrow Dreams Today"
- Location in Minnehaha County and the state of South Dakota
- Coordinates: 43°45′28″N 96°44′38″W
- Country: United States
- State: South Dakota
- County: Minnehaha
- Platted: 1881
- Incorporated: 1907

Government
  - Mayor: Deborah McIsaac

Area
  - Total: 0.77 sq mi (1.99 km^{2})
  - Land: 0.74 sq mi (1.91 km^{2})
  - Water: 0.027 sq mi (0.07 km^{2})
- Elevation: 1,490 ft (450 m)

Population (2020)
  - Total: 1,246
  - Density: 1,687.9/sq mi (651.69/km^{2})
- Time zone: UTC−6 (Central (CST))
  - Summer (DST): UTC−5 (CDT)
- ZIP code: 57003
- Area code: 605
- FIPS code: 46-03380
- GNIS feature ID: 1267277
- Website: baltic.govoffice.com

Baltic is a city on the Big Sioux River in northern Minnehaha County, South Dakota, United States. The population was 1,246 at the 2020 census.

== History ==
Baltic was originally called St. Olaf, and under the latter name was laid out in 1881. Another variant name was Keyes. A post office was established under the name Saint Olaf in 1872, the name was changed to Keyes in 1887, and the name was again changed to Baltic in 1889. The Chicago, Milwaukee, Saint Paul and Pacific Railroad built through Baltic and established a railroad depot.

== Geography ==
Baltic is located along the Big Sioux River.

According to the United States Census Bureau, the city has a total area of 0.76 square miles (1.97 km^{2}), of which, 0.74 square miles (1.92 km^{2}) is land and 0.02 square miles (0.05 km^{2}) is water.

== Demographics ==
Historical population
Census	Pop.	Note	%±
1910	278		—
1920	287		3.2%
1930	272		−5.2%
1940	270		−0.7%
1950	255		−5.6%
1960	278		9.0%
1970	364		30.9%
1980	679		86.5%
1990	666		−1.9%
2000	811		21.8%
2010	1,089		34.3%
2020	1,246		14.4%
U.S. Decennial Census

=== 2020 census ===
As of the 2020 census, Baltic had a population of 1,246 and a median age of 35.3 years; 30.6% of residents were under the age of 18 and 10.6% were 65 years of age or older, and for every 100 females there were 103.6 males with 100.7 males for every 100 females age 18 and over.

There were 458 households in Baltic, of which 40.2% had children under the age of 18 living in them. Of all households, 58.5% were married-couple households, 16.2% were households with a male householder and no spouse or partner present, and 16.6% were households with a female householder and no spouse or partner present; about 21.4% of all households were made up of individuals and 6.9% had someone living alone who was 65 years of age or older.

There were 481 housing units, of which 4.8% were vacant. The homeowner vacancy rate was 1.2% and the rental vacancy rate was 11.4%.

0.0% of residents lived in urban areas, while 100.0% lived in rural areas.

Racial composition as of the 2020 census
Race	Number	Percent
White	1,152	92.5%
Black or African American	6	0.5%
American Indian and Alaska Native	5	0.4%
Asian	3	0.2%
Native Hawaiian and Other Pacific Islander	0	0.0%
Some other race	19	1.5%
Two or more races	61	4.9%
Hispanic or Latino (of any race)	35	2.8%

=== 2010 census ===
As of the census of 2010, there were 1,089 people, 389 households, and 302 families living in the city. The population density was 1,471.6 inhabitants per square mile (568.2/km^{2}). There were 409 housing units at an average density of 552.7 units per square mile (213.4 units/km^{2}). The racial makeup of the city was 95.4% White, 0.5% African American, 0.9% Native American, 2.1% from other races, and 1.1% from two or more races. Hispanic or Latino of any race were 2.2% of the population.

There were 389 households, of which 47.0% had children under the age of 18 living with them, 60.4% were married couples living together, 10.3% had a female householder with no husband present, 6.9% had a male householder with no wife present, and 22.4% were non-families. 19.0% of all households were made up of individuals, and 5.2% had someone living alone who was 65 years of age or older. The average household size was 2.80 and the average family size was 3.20.

The median age in the city was 30.9 years. 32.8% of residents were under the age of 18; 7.4% were between the ages of 18 and 24; 33% were from 25 to 44; 20.7% were from 45 to 64; and 6.2% were 65 years of age or older. The gender makeup of the city was 51.0% male and 49.0% female.

=== 2000 census ===
As of the census of 2000, there were 811 people, 300 households, and 233 families living in the city. The population density was 1,151.4 inhabitants per square mile (444.6/km^{2}). There were 311 housing units at an average density of 441.5 units per square mile (170.5 units/km^{2}). The racial makeup of the city was 98.89% White, 0.49% Native American, and 0.62% from two or more races. Hispanic or Latino of any race were 0.12% of the population.

There were 300 households, out of which 42.7% had children under the age of 18 living with them, 62.0% were married couples living together, 11.3% had a female householder with no husband present, and 22.3% were non-families. 18.7% of all households were made up of individuals, and 7.7% had someone living alone who was 65 years of age or older. The average household size was 2.70 and the average family size was 3.08.

In the city, the population was spread out, with 30.2% under the age of 18, 10.6% from 18 to 24, 31.8% from 25 to 44, 18.6% from 45 to 64, and 8.8% who were 65 years of age or older. The median age was 30 years. For every 100 females, there were 93.6 males. For every 100 females age 18 and over, there were 95.8 males.

As of 2000 the median income for a household in the city was $46,023, and the median income for a family was $50,000. Males had a median income of $30,188 versus $22,260 for females. The per capita income for the city was $16,268. About 3.3% of families and 3.9% of the population were below the poverty line, including 5.3% of those under age 18 and 4.9% of those age 65 or over.

== Education ==
Baltic Public Schools are part of Baltic School District. The three schools in the district include Baltic Elementary School, Baltic Middle School and Baltic High School.

The school district is surrounded by the Dell Rapids School District. The Baltic School District mascot is the Bulldog.

== Culture ==
Baltic River Park Days is a family friendly event taking place the 3rd weekend of July. The Scenic River Park is the backdrop for free movies in the park, kickball, tug of war, bean bags, kids games, duck races, show and shine and a Grand Parade.

== Transportation ==
While Baltic is situated between (and within just a few mile of) both Interstate 29 and Highway 115, neither highway passes through the city. Access to both highways is via east–west 250th Street.

== Notable people ==
- Nils Boe, Governor of South Dakota from 1965 to 1969.
- Hemming O. Oien (1926-2010), politician
- Hans Ustrud, Lieutenant Governor of South Dakota from 1933 to 1935

== See also ==
- List of cities in South Dakota
