= Crazy Horse School =

School in South Dakota, United States

Coordinates: 43.5729°N 101.6691°W

Crazy Horse School (Lakota: Tȟašúŋke Witkó Owáyawa) is a tribally-controlled K-12 school in Wanblee, South Dakota. It is affiliated with the Bureau of Indian Education (BIE). It is within the Pine Ridge Indian Reservation.

Its high school program is one of five high schools that are within the reservation boundaries.

== History ==
It was established in the 1960s so residents would not need to send their children to Native American boarding schools. It was named after Crazy Horse. Its current building was established circa 1975.

In 2005 the tribal council suspended the operation of the school board. At the time there were residents championing the dissolution of the school board.

In 2015 it had 334 students.

In 2016 it got a suicide prevention grant.
