= White Lake, South Dakota =

- City
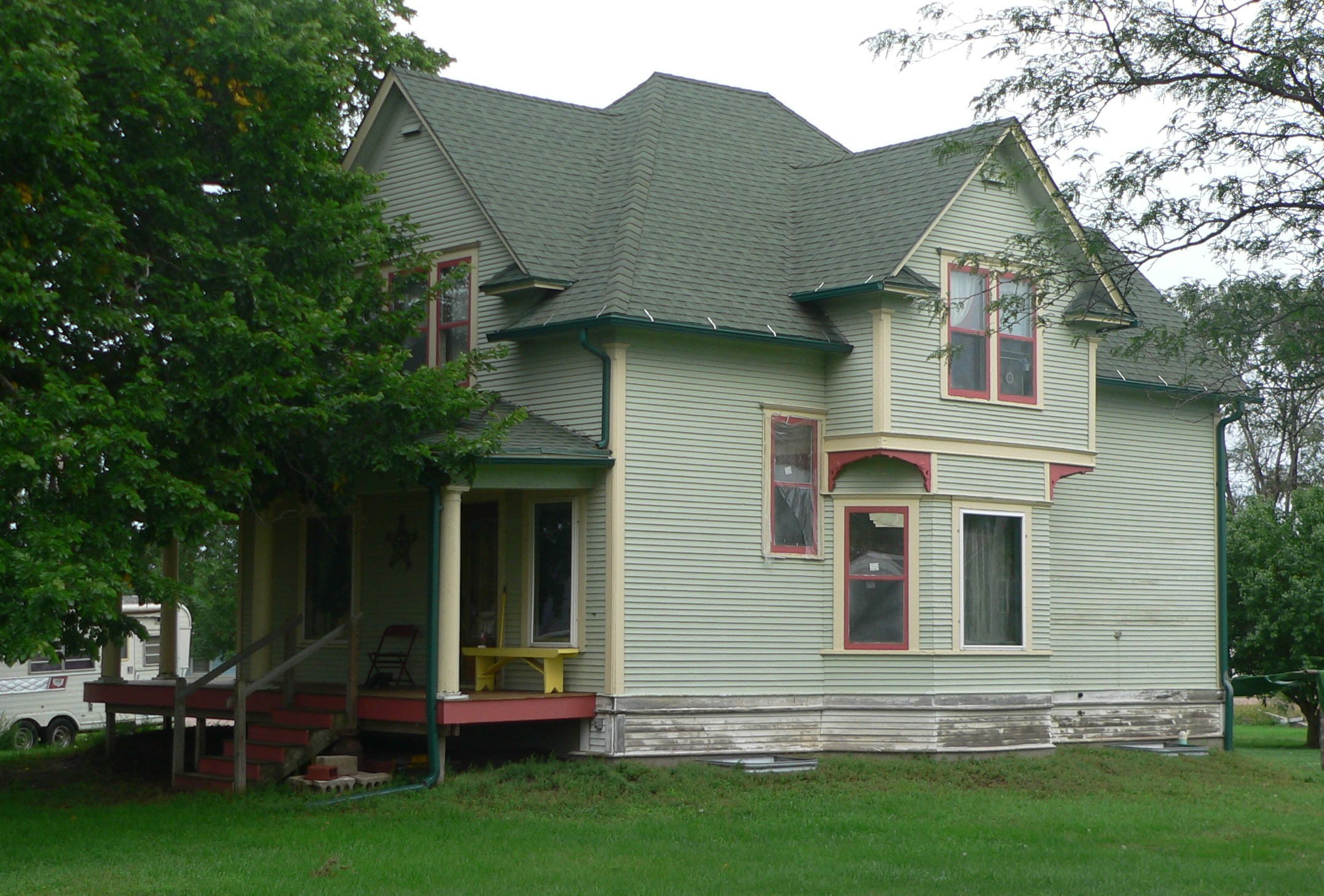
- Hofmeister House
- Motto: "Powering the Future"
- Location in Aurora County and the state of South Dakota
- Coordinates: 43°43′42″N 98°42′43″W
- Country: United States
- State: South Dakota
- County: Aurora
- Incorporated: 1882

Government
  - Mayor: Janice Thiry

Area
  - Total: 0.41 sq mi (1.05 km^{2})
  - Land: 0.41 sq mi (1.05 km^{2})
  - Water: 0 sq mi (0.00 km^{2})
- Elevation: 1,644 ft (501 m)

Population (2020)
  - Total: 394
  - Density: 973/sq mi (375.8/km^{2})
- Time zone: UTC-6 (Central (CST))
  - Summer (DST): UTC-5 (CDT)
- ZIP code: 57383
- Area code: 605
- FIPS code: 46-71180
- GNIS feature ID: 1267652
- Website: www.whitelakesd.com

White Lake is a city in western Aurora County, South Dakota, United States. The population was 394 at the 2020 census.

== Geography ==
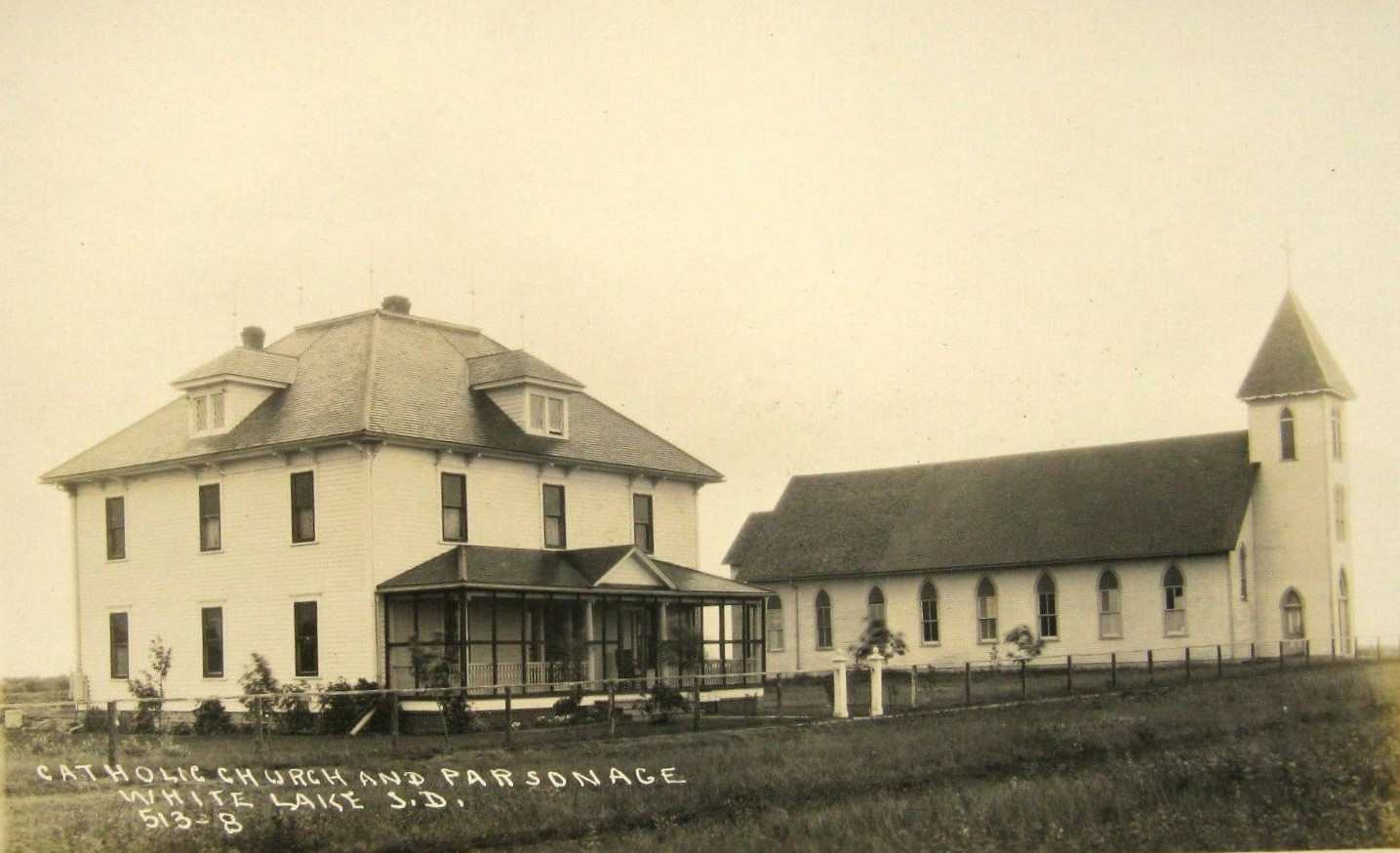
White Lake Catholic Church and parsonage - 1918

According to the United States Census Bureau, the city has a total area of 0.43 square miles (1.11 km^{2}), all land.

=== Climate ===
Climate data for White Lake, South Dakota (1991−2020 normals, extremes 1920−present)
Month	Jan	Feb	Mar	Apr	May	Jun	Jul	Aug	Sep	Oct	Nov	Dec	Year
Record high °F (°C)	67 (19)	73 (23)	93 (34)	98 (37)	109 (43)	111 (44)	115 (46)	116 (47)	106 (41)	100 (38)	83 (28)	72 (22)	116 (47)
Mean maximum °F (°C)	51.3 (10.7)	58.1 (14.5)	71.8 (22.1)	81.8 (27.7)	87.2 (30.7)	93.8 (34.3)	99.4 (37.4)	97.2 (36.2)	92.7 (33.7)	83.4 (28.6)	69.1 (20.6)	53.0 (11.7)	100.7 (38.2)
Mean daily maximum °F (°C)	27.1 (−2.7)	32.0 (0.0)	44.0 (6.7)	57.0 (13.9)	68.5 (20.3)	78.8 (26.0)	85.5 (29.7)	83.1 (28.4)	75.4 (24.1)	59.8 (15.4)	44.1 (6.7)	30.7 (−0.7)	57.2 (14.0)
Daily mean °F (°C)	17.7 (−7.9)	21.8 (−5.7)	32.9 (0.5)	44.9 (7.2)	57.2 (14.0)	67.9 (19.9)	73.9 (23.3)	71.3 (21.8)	62.8 (17.1)	47.9 (8.8)	33.4 (0.8)	21.7 (−5.7)	46.1 (7.8)
Mean daily minimum °F (°C)	8.2 (−13.2)	11.7 (−11.3)	21.7 (−5.7)	32.9 (0.5)	46.0 (7.8)	57.1 (13.9)	62.3 (16.8)	59.5 (15.3)	50.2 (10.1)	36.1 (2.3)	22.7 (−5.2)	12.6 (−10.8)	35.1 (1.7)
Mean minimum °F (°C)	−13.9 (−25.5)	−9.3 (−22.9)	0.7 (−17.4)	17.4 (−8.1)	31.3 (−0.4)	44.8 (7.1)	50.8 (10.4)	49.3 (9.6)	34.5 (1.4)	19.3 (−7.1)	5.7 (−14.6)	−8.1 (−22.3)	−18.4 (−28.0)
Record low °F (°C)	−32 (−36)	−32 (−36)	−24 (−31)	−2 (−19)	16 (−9)	32 (0)	36 (2)	36 (2)	17 (−8)	−5 (−21)	−18 (−28)	−32 (−36)	−32 (−36)
Average precipitation inches (mm)	0.47 (12)	0.68 (17)	1.01 (26)	3.03 (77)	3.72 (94)	3.63 (92)	2.99 (76)	2.58 (66)	2.58 (66)	1.87 (47)	0.70 (18)	0.62 (16)	23.88 (607)
Average snowfall inches (cm)	7.1 (18)	8.4 (21)	5.2 (13)	5.4 (14)	0.0 (0.0)	0.0 (0.0)	0.0 (0.0)	0.0 (0.0)	0.0 (0.0)	0.8 (2.0)	3.7 (9.4)	7.1 (18)	37.7 (96)
Average precipitation days (≥ 0.01 in)	3.2	3.5	3.7	7.0	8.2	8.1	5.7	5.6	4.6	4.8	2.8	3.1	60.3
Average snowy days (≥ 0.1 in)	3.4	3.2	2.5	1.6	0.0	0.0	0.0	0.0	0.0	0.4	1.5	2.7	15.3
Source: NOAA

== Demographics ==
Historical population
Census	Pop.	Note	%±
1890	366		—
1900	264		−27.9%
1910	507		92.0%
1920	610		20.3%
1930	530		−13.1%
1940	496		−6.4%
1950	395		−20.4%
1960	397		0.5%
1970	395		−0.5%
1980	414		4.8%
1990	419		1.2%
2000	405		−3.3%
2010	372		−8.1%
2020	394		5.9%
U.S. Decennial Census

=== 2020 census ===
As of the 2020 census, White Lake had a population of 394. The median age was 53.2 years. 22.1% of residents were under the age of 18 and 35.5% of residents were 65 years of age or older. For every 100 females there were 103.1 males, and for every 100 females age 18 and over there were 93.1 males age 18 and over.

0.0% of residents lived in urban areas, while 100.0% lived in rural areas.

There were 155 households in White Lake, of which 27.1% had children under the age of 18 living in them. Of all households, 51.0% were married-couple households, 20.6% were households with a male householder and no spouse or partner present, and 23.2% were households with a female householder and no spouse or partner present. About 34.2% of all households were made up of individuals and 16.8% had someone living alone who was 65 years of age or older.

There were 184 housing units, of which 15.8% were vacant. The homeowner vacancy rate was 0.0% and the rental vacancy rate was 10.3%.

Racial composition as of the 2020 census
Race	Number	Percent
White	375	95.2%
Black or African American	1	0.3%
American Indian and Alaska Native	5	1.3%
Asian	1	0.3%
Native Hawaiian and Other Pacific Islander	0	0.0%
Some other race	2	0.5%
Two or more races	10	2.5%
Hispanic or Latino (of any race)	15	3.8%

=== 2010 census ===
As of the census of 2010, there were 372 people, 161 households, and 88 families residing in the city. The population density was 865.1 inhabitants per square mile (334.0/km^{2}). There were 192 housing units at an average density of 446.5 units per square mile (172.4 units/km^{2}). The racial makeup of the city was 94.9% White, 1.1% African American, 0.3% Native American, 2.7% Asian, and 1.1% from two or more races. Hispanic or Latino of any race were 1.6% of the population. Since then there have been Hispanic families that have moved to White Lake, such as the Avila and Orozco/Gusan family.

There were 161 households, of which 22.4% had children under the age of 18 living with them, 44.7% were married couples living together, 5.0% had a female householder with no husband present, 5.0% had a male householder with no wife present, and 45.3% were non-families. 41.0% of all households were made up of individuals, and 23.6% had someone living alone who was 65 years of age or older. The average household size was 2.09 and the average family size was 2.83.

The median age in the city was 50.5 years. 21.5% of residents were under the age of 18; 5.6% were between the ages of 18 and 24; 15% were from 25 to 44; 28% were from 45 to 64; and 29.8% were 65 years of age or older. The gender makeup of the city was 47.0% male and 53.0% female.

=== 2000 census ===
As of the census of 2000, there were 405 people, 151 households, and 96 families residing in the city. The population density was 1,014.7 inhabitants per square mile (391.8/km^{2}). There were 166 housing units at an average density of 415.9 units per square mile (160.6 units/km^{2}). The racial makeup of the city was 98.27% White, 1.48% Native American, and 0.25% from two or more races.

There were 151 households, out of which 25.2% had children under the age of 18 living with them, 53.0% were married couples living together, 7.9% had a female householder with no husband present, and 36.4% were non-families. 34.4% of all households were made up of individuals, and 20.5% had someone living alone who was 65 years of age or older. The average household size was 2.27 and the average family size was 2.96.

In the city, the population was spread out, with 21.5% under the age of 18, 5.7% from 18 to 24, 16.8% from 25 to 44, 19.5% from 45 to 64, and 36.5% who were 65 years of age or older. The median age was 49 years. For every 100 females, there were 77.6 males. For every 100 females age 18 and over, there were 71.9 males.

The median income for a household in the city was $25,500, and the median income for a family was $38,611. Males had a median income of $26,500 versus $20,795 for females. The per capita income for the city was $13,034. About 9.0% of families and 19.0% of the population were below the poverty line, including 24.7% of those under age 18 and 14.8% of those age 65 or over.

== Education ==
White Lake Public Schools belong to White Lake School District (South Dakota). The three schools in the district include White Lake Elementary School, White Lake Junior High and White Lake High School, all three of which are located in one building. The school provides the basic classes: Math, Science, English/Literature, Social Studies, Band, Vocal, Computer, Psychology, Accounting, and Physical Education.

Robert Schroeder is the Superintendent of Schools.

== See also ==
- List of cities in South Dakota
