= Colton, South Dakota =

- City
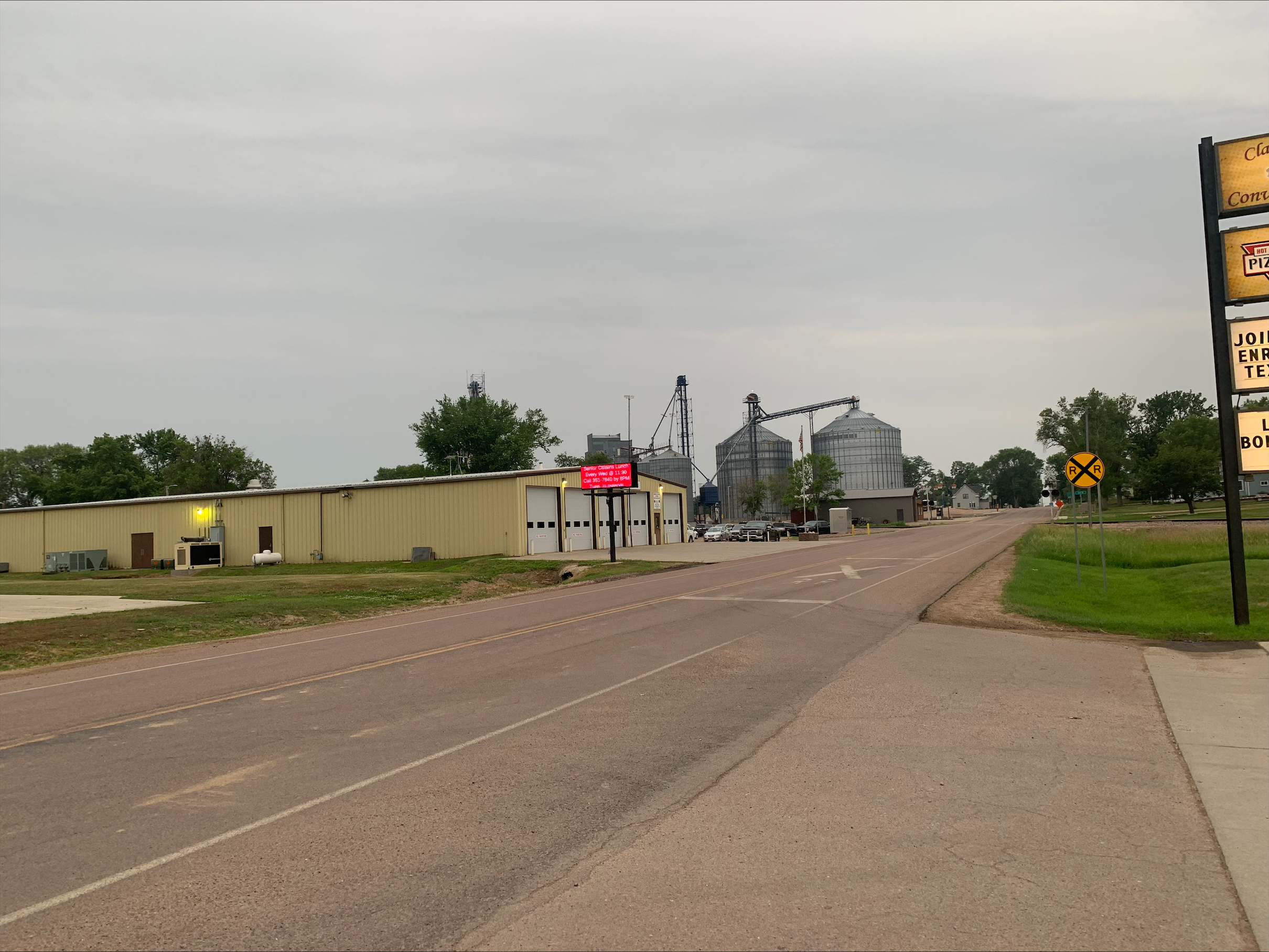
- South Main Avenue in Colton

- Seal

- Location in Minnehaha County and the state of South Dakota
- Coordinates: 43°47′13″N 96°55′41″W
- Country: United States
- State: South Dakota
- County: Minnehaha
- Incorporated: 1904

Area
  - Total: 0.70 sq mi (1.82 km^{2})
  - Land: 0.70 sq mi (1.82 km^{2})
  - Water: 0 sq mi (0.00 km^{2})
- Elevation: 1,604 ft (489 m)

Population (2020)
  - Total: 738
  - Density: 1,052.4/sq mi (406.34/km^{2})
- Time zone: UTC-6 (Central (CST))
  - Summer (DST): UTC-5 (CDT)
- ZIP code: 57018
- Area code: 605
- FIPS code: 46-13380
- GNIS feature ID: 1267334
- Website: cityofcoltonsd.com

Colton is a city in Minnehaha County, South Dakota, United States. The population was 736 at the 2024 census.

Colton has the name of J. E. Colton, a railroad official.

== History ==
=== Creation ===
The town started with a creamery in 1897, made by J. E. Colton. Other businesses started to form around the creamery, making a Main Street. In 1901, the founder started a newspaper called "The Colton Courier" that stayed in place for years. The three other shareowners were W. O. Colton and Dave Crooks, the founder of Colton's Neighboring town, Crooks. Between 1905 and 1906 a railroad was built through Colton, which used to have passenger service. J. E. Colton was 53 years old when he died in 1910.

=== Schools ===
The first Colton school was made in 1879 by the town's founder, J. E. Colton, and was a one-room schoolhouse. From 1903 to 1905 a new, larger schoolhouse was built in place of the old one and began to teach high school subjects. In 1907 a high school was built that was meant to put students through for two years each. It met that goal, but lasted no more than two years, being put out of use in 1909. 1913 started a new four-year high school with six teachers that lasted much longer. Near the end of 1924, a new school was built out of brick. It used the same standard system as the previous school. The school stopped being used in 1967 when the school of Tri-Valley was constructed, which combined the students of several small towns.

=== 1993 Tornado ===
On June 7th 1993, an F4 tornado passed to the northeast of the town, causing significant damage to several homes and injuring 4

== Geography ==
According to the United States Census Bureau, the city has a total area of 0.70 square miles (1.81 km^{2}), all land.

== Demographics ==
Historical population
Census	Pop.	Note	%±
1910	407		—
1920	608		49.4%
1930	575		−5.4%
1940	615		7.0%
1950	521		−15.3%
1960	593		13.8%
1970	601		1.3%
1980	757		26.0%
1990	657		−13.2%
2000	662		0.8%
2010	687		3.8%
2020	738		7.4%
U.S. Decennial Census

=== 2024 Census ===
The 2024 census revealed Colton has a current standing population of 736 individuals residing on 0.7 square miles. The median age of residents is 41.3 with 56% of the population being between 18 and 64 years old. 54% of the population is composed of women. Of the 736 individuals in Colton, 92% of them are white.

The population has 1.5 times the poverty rate of neighboring Sioux Falls; 14.3% of residence live below the poverty line- this includes 22% of children and 6% of seniors. 61% of their 323 households are owned by married couples. The average number of people per household is 2.3.

=== 2020 census ===
As of the 2020 census, Colton had a population of 738. The median age was 39.0 years. 27.4% of residents were under the age of 18 and 15.9% of residents were 65 years of age or older. For every 100 females there were 105.6 males, and for every 100 females age 18 and over there were 105.4 males age 18 and over.

0.0% of residents lived in urban areas, while 100.0% lived in rural areas.

There were 300 households in Colton, of which 34.7% had children under the age of 18 living in them. Of all households, 49.7% were married-couple households, 20.7% were households with a male householder and no spouse or partner present, and 21.0% were households with a female householder and no spouse or partner present. About 33.0% of all households were made up of individuals and 14.3% had someone living alone who was 65 years of age or older.

There were 323 housing units, of which 7.1% were vacant. The homeowner vacancy rate was 4.2% and the rental vacancy rate was 6.3%.

Racial composition as of the 2020 census
Race	Number	Percent
White	714	96.7%
Black or African American	9	1.2%
American Indian and Alaska Native	1	0.1%
Asian	0	0.0%
Native Hawaiian and Other Pacific Islander	0	0.0%
Some other race	4	0.5%
Two or more races	10	1.4%
Hispanic or Latino (of any race)	2	0.3%

=== 2010 census ===
As of the census of 2010, there were 687 people, 302 households, and 184 families residing in the city. The population density was 981.4 inhabitants per square mile (378.9/km^{2}). There were 320 housing units at an average density of 457.1 units per square mile (176.5 units/km^{2}). The racial makeup of the city was 98.4% White, 0.1% African American, 0.7% Native American, and 0.7% from two or more races. Hispanic or Latino of any race were 0.7% of the population.

There were 302 households, of which 30.8% had children under the age of 18 living with them, 47.0% were married couples living together, 7.9% had a female householder with no husband present, 6.0% had a male householder with no wife present, and 39.1% were non-families. 34.8% of all households were made up of individuals, and 16.5% had someone living alone who was 65 years of age or older. The average household size was 2.27 and the average family size was 2.92.

The median age in the city was 36.1 years. 26.2% of residents were under the age of 18; 5.7% were between the ages of 18 and 24; 29.2% were from 25 to 44; 23.2% were from 45 to 64; and 15.9% were 65 years of age or older. The gender makeup of the city was 48.6% male and 51.4% female.

=== 2000 census ===
As of the census of 2000, there were 662 people, 266 households, and 184 families residing in the city. The population density was 948.1 inhabitants per square mile (366.1/km^{2}). There were 285 housing units at an average density of 408.2 units per square mile (157.6 units/km^{2}). The racial makeup of the city was 99.09% White, 0.30% Native American, 0.15% Pacific Islander, 0.30% from other races, and 0.15% from two or more races. Hispanic or Latino of any race were 1.21% of the population.

There were 266 households, out of which 32.7% had children under the age of 18 living with them, 57.9% were married couples living together, 9.0% had a female householder with no husband present, and 30.5% were non-families. 27.4% of all households were made up of individuals, and 13.2% had someone living alone who was 65 years of age or older. The average household size was 2.43 and the average family size was 2.95.

In the city, the population was spread out, with 24.5% under the age of 18, 8.8% from 18 to 24, 27.3% from 25 to 44, 19.5% from 45 to 64, and 19.9% who were 65 years of age or older. The median age was 37 years. For every 100 females, there were 94.7 males. For every 100 females age 18 and over, there were 96.1 males.

The median income for a household in the city was $42,054, and the median income for a family was $45,139. Males had a median income of $28,958 versus $22,083 for females. The per capita income for the city was $18,189. About 3.6% of families and 4.1% of the population were below the poverty line, including 4.4% of those under age 18 and 4.6% of those age 65 or over.
