= Avon School District (South Dakota) =

Public school district in Bon Homme County, South Dakota (USA)

Address
- 210 Pine St Avon, South Dakota, 57315; United States

District information
- Grades: Pre-school - 12
- Superintendent: Tom Culver
- Enrollment: 243

Other information
- Telephone: (605) 286-3291
- Website: Avon School District

The Avon School District is a public school district in Bon Homme County, based in Avon, South Dakota.

== Schools ==
The Avon School District has one elementary school, one middle school, and one high school.

=== Elementary school ===
- Avon Elementary School

=== Middle school ===
- Avon Middle School

=== High school ===
- Avon High School
