= Dakota Valley School District (South Dakota) =

School district in South Dakota, United States

Address
- 1150 Northshore Dr North Sioux City, South Dakota, 57049; United States

District information
- Grades: Pre-school - 12
- Superintendent: Garrett Schmidt
- NCES District ID: 4636990

Students and staff
- Enrollment: 1,385
- Student–teacher ratio: 15.41

Other information
- Telephone: (605) 422-3800
- Website: www.dvschools.com

The Dakota Valley School District (locally known as “DV”) is a public school district in Union County, based in North Sioux City, South Dakota. The district serves the residents of North Sioux City and the surrounding communities, including Dakota Dunes, Riv-r-Land Estates, and Wynstone. As of fall 2021, 1,386 students were enrolled across its four schools.

== History ==
Dakota Valley School District was established July 1st, 1994 as a result of the division of the Jefferson School district. The growing population of North Sioux City, and the newly created community Dakota Dunes, caused disagreements between the residents of Jefferson and North Sioux City over where new school buildings were to be built. The splitting opinions led to the creation of the Dakota Valley School District and The Elk Point-Jefferson School District.Dakota Valley’s first year had an initial enrollment of 621 students.

== Schools ==
The Dakota Valley School District operates one elementary school, one middle school, and one high school.

=== Elementary school ===
Dakota Valley Elementary School serves kindergarten through third grade students. The Elementary school completed construction in 2001.

=== Upper Elementary school ===
Dakota Valley Upper Elementary School serves fourth and fifth grade students. While the building was constructed in 1996, the upper elementary was established in 2016 after the construction of the new high school.

=== Middle school ===
Dakota Valley Middle School serves sixth through eighth grade students. The middle school was constructed in 1979 originally for the Jefferson school district, and has had multiple expansions within its first few years.

=== High school ===
Dakota Valley High School serves ninth through twelfth grade students. The high school was built in 2016 as an $27 million dollar expansion for an increasing population in the community, along with significant improvements to the athletics facilities.

=== Extensions ===
In 2008, the Peterson Fitness center was added to the high school, which is now the upper elementary.

In 2009, multiple classrooms were added to the upper elementary and elementary schools.

In 2010, the Nylen Science Center was added to the middle school, which included 4 new lab classrooms and new administrative offices.
