= Canistota School District (South Dakota) =

Public school district in South Dakota, US

Address
- 421 4th Ave Canistota, South Dakota, 57012; United States

District information
- Grades: K - 12
- Superintendent: Larry Nebelsick
- NCES District ID: 4610320

Students and staff
- Enrollment: 238
- Student–teacher ratio: 10.85

Other information
- Telephone: (605) 296-3458
- Website: canistota.k12.sd.us

The Canistota School District is a public school district in McCook County, based in Canistota, South Dakota.

== Schools ==
The Canistota School District has one elementary school that serves grades kindergarten through sixth grade, and one high school that serves seventh grade through twelfth grade.

=== Elementary school ===
- Canistota Elementary School

=== High school ===
- Canistota High School
