= White Lake School District (South Dakota) =

School district in South Dakota, United States

Address
- 502 East Division St Zebulon, South Dakota, 57383; United States

District information
- Grades: K - 12
- Superintendent: Robert Schroeder
- NCES District ID: 4678510

Students and staff
- Enrollment: 138
- Staff: 14.01 (on an FTE basis)
- Student–teacher ratio: 9.21

Other information
- Telephone: (605) 249-2251
- Website: www.whitelake.k12.sd.us

The White Lake School District is a public school district in Aurora County, based in White Lake, South Dakota.

== Schools ==
The White Lake School District has one elementary school, one junior high school, and one high school.

=== Elementary schools ===
- White Lake Elementary School

=== Junior High schools ===
- White Lake Junior High School

=== High schools ===
- White Lake High School
