= Harrisburg School District (South Dakota) =

School district in South Dakota, United States

Coordinates: 43.432°N 96.699°W

Location
- Harrisburg, Lincoln County, South Dakota, 57032; United States

District information
- Motto: Building Strong Foundations for Success
- Grades: PK–12
- Established: 1894
- Superintendent: Tim Graf
- Schools: 11
- NCES District ID: 4631350
- District ID: 41-2

Students and staff
- Students: 6,098 (2023–24)
- Teachers: 455.39 (on an FTE basis)
- Student–teacher ratio: 13.39
- District mascot: Tigers
- Colors: Maroon & Gold

Other information
- Website: harrisburgdistrict41-2.org

Harrisburg School District is one of the largest school districts in South Dakota, located 7 miles from Sioux Falls in Lincoln County, serving 6,195 students as of the 2024–2025 school year. The superintendent of the district is Tim Graf. Due to the overlap between the city limits of Sioux Falls and the Harrisburg School District, 2 of the 3 middle schools and 4 of the 7 elementary schools are located within the city of Sioux Falls in addition to the Freshman Academy campus of Harrisburg High School.

Former high school principal Dr. Kevin Lein, was shot on September 30, 2015 by Mason Buhl, a student at the school. Current principal Ryan Rollinger (who, at the time, was the assistant principal) tackled the shooter. This marked the second in-school shooting in South Dakota, and the first with malicious intent involved. The principal was not seriously injured, sustaining only a shot in his arm.

Harrisburg has also Pioneered a Modular Customized Learning option, which allows for students to move through curriculum at their own pace, and perform necessary learning targets with different media based projects.

On December 13, 2019, an unidentified student threatened Harrisburg North, one of the districts 2 middle schools. In an Email to KSFY (now Dakota News Now), the school district said that "the threat was not viable." School was not called off.

== Schools ==
=== High schools ===
- Harrisburg High School (1,800 students)
  - 9th grade students attend the Freshman Academy campus in Sioux Falls, while 10th through 12th grade students attend the main high school campus in Harrisburg

=== Middle schools ===
- East Middle School (428 students) - located in Sioux Falls
- North Middle School (534 students) - located in Sioux Falls
- South Middle School (519 students)

=== Elementary schools ===
- Adventure Elementary School (439 students)
- Endeavor Elementary School (336 students) - located in Sioux Falls
- Explorer Elementary School (337 students) - located in Sioux Falls
- Freedom Elementary School (442 students)
- Horizon Elementary School (457 students) - located in Sioux Falls
- Journey Elementary School (338 students) - located in Sioux Falls
- Liberty Elementary School (540 students)

Enrollment numbers as of the 2024-2025 school year.
