= Colman, South Dakota =

Colman
- City
- Location in Moody County and the state of South Dakota
- Coordinates: 43°59′01″N 96°48′53″W
- Country: United States
- State: South Dakota
- County: Moody
- Founded: 1880

Area
  - Total: 1.88 sq mi (4.88 km^{2})
  - Land: 1.88 sq mi (4.88 km^{2})
  - Water: 0 sq mi (0.00 km^{2})
- Elevation: 1,700 ft (520 m)

Population (2020)
  - Total: 634
  - Density: 336.5/sq mi (129.94/km^{2})
- Time zone: UTC-6 (CST)
  - Summer (DST): UTC-5 (CDT)
- ZIP Code: 57017
- Area code: 605
- FIPS code: 46-13220
- GNIS feature ID: 1267332
- Website: www.colmansd.com

Colman is a city in Moody County, South Dakota, United States. The population was 634 at the 2020 census.

== History ==
Colman was first named Allentown, and under the latter name got its start in 1890, following construction of the Milwaukee Railroad through the territory.

== Geography ==
According to the United States Census Bureau, the city has a total area of 1.88 square miles (4.87 km^{2}), all land.

== Demographics ==
Historical population
Census	Pop.	Note	%±
1900	213		—
1910	362		70.0%
1920	535		47.8%
1930	488		−8.8%
1940	462		−5.3%
1950	509		10.2%
1960	505		−0.8%
1970	456		−9.7%
1980	501		9.9%
1990	482		−3.8%
2000	572		18.7%
2010	594		3.8%
2020	634		6.7%
U.S. Decennial Census

=== 2020 census ===
As of the 2020 census, Colman had a population of 634. The median age was 35.3 years; 29.2% of residents were under the age of 18, and 10.7% were 65 years of age or older. For every 100 females there were 100.6 males, and for every 100 females age 18 and over there were 106.0 males age 18 and over.

According to the 2020 census's demographic and housing characteristics, 0.0% of residents lived in urban areas while 100.0% lived in rural areas.

There were 258 households in Colman, of which 35.3% had children under the age of 18 living in them. Of all households, 48.8% were married-couple households, 19.8% were households with a male householder and no spouse or partner present, and 20.9% were households with a female householder and no spouse or partner present. About 28.7% of all households were made up of individuals and 10.9% had someone living alone who was 65 years of age or older.

There were 285 housing units, of which 9.5% were vacant. The homeowner vacancy rate was 0.0% and the rental vacancy rate was 17.6%.

Racial composition as of the 2020 census
Race	Number	Percent
White	586	92.4%
Black or African American	3	0.5%
American Indian and Alaska Native	3	0.5%
Asian	0	0.0%
Native Hawaiian and Other Pacific Islander	1	0.2%
Some other race	13	2.1%
Two or more races	28	4.4%
Hispanic or Latino (of any race)	18	2.8%

=== 2010 census ===
As of the census of 2010, there were 594 people, 237 households, and 160 families residing in the city. The population density was 316.0 inhabitants per square mile (122.0/km^{2}). There were 263 housing units at an average density of 139.9 units per square mile (54.0 units/km^{2}). The racial makeup of the city was 94.4% White, 0.3% African American, 1.7% Native American, 0.8% Asian, 0.8% from other races, and 1.9% from two or more races. Hispanic or Latino of any race were 1.7% of the population.

There were 237 households, of which 38.0% had children under the age of 18 living with them, 50.6% were married couples living together, 12.7% had a female householder with no husband present, 4.2% had a male householder with no wife present, and 32.5% were non-families. 29.5% of all households were made up of individuals, and 13.1% had someone living alone who was 65 years of age or older. The average household size was 2.51 and the average family size was 3.11.

The median age in the city was 35.7 years. 30.8% of residents were under the age of 18; 7.1% were between the ages of 18 and 24; 25.5% were from 25 to 44; 23% were from 45 to 64; and 13.8% were 65 years of age or older. The gender makeup of the city was 51.9% male and 48.1% female.

=== 2000 census ===
As of the census of 2000, there were 572 people, 242 households, and 156 families residing in the city. The population density was 344.0 inhabitants per square mile (132.8/km^{2}). There were 259 housing units at an average density of 155.7 units per square mile (60.1 units/km^{2}). The racial makeup of the city was 96.85% White, 0.35% Native American, 1.22% Asian, and 1.57% from two or more races. Hispanic or Latino of any race were 1.22% of the population.

There were 242 households, out of which 34.7% had children under the age of 18 living with them, 53.3% were married couples living together, 8.7% had a female householder with no husband present, and 35.5% were non-families. 32.2% of all households were made up of individuals, and 14.5% had someone living alone who was 65 years of age or older. The average household size was 2.36 and the average family size was 3.03.

In the city, the population was spread out, with 28.5% under the age of 18, 7.3% from 18 to 24, 30.6% from 25 to 44, 20.3% from 45 to 64, and 13.3% who were 65 years of age or older. The median age was 35 years. For every 100 females, there were 86.9 males. For every 100 females age 18 and over, there were 92.0 males.

The median income for a household in the city was $32,143, and the median income for a family was $44,000. Males had a median income of $32,212 versus $21,442 for females. The per capita income for the city was $16,772. About 6.1% of families and 7.7% of the population were below the poverty line, including 7.7% of those under age 18 and 7.2% of those age 65 or over.

== Education ==
It is in the Colman-Egan School District 50-5.
