= Elk Point-Jefferson School District (South Dakota) =

School district in South Dakota, United States

Address
- 402 South Douglas St Elk Point, South Dakota, 57025; United States

District information
- Motto: "Showing Pride...Taking Action"
- Grades: K - 12
- Superintendent: Philip Schonebaum
- NCES District ID: 4621340

Students and staff
- Enrollment: 734
- Student–teacher ratio: 14.59

Other information
- Telephone: (605) 356-5951
- Website: www.epj.k12.sd.us

The Elk Point-Jefferson School District is a public school district in Union County, based in Elk Point, South Dakota.

== Schools ==
The Elk Point-Jefferson School District has one elementary school, one middle school, and one high school.

=== Elementary schools ===
- Elk Point-Jefferson Elementary School

=== Middle school ===
- Elk Point-Jefferson Middle School

=== High school ===
- Elk Point-Jefferson High School
