= Canistota, South Dakota =

- City
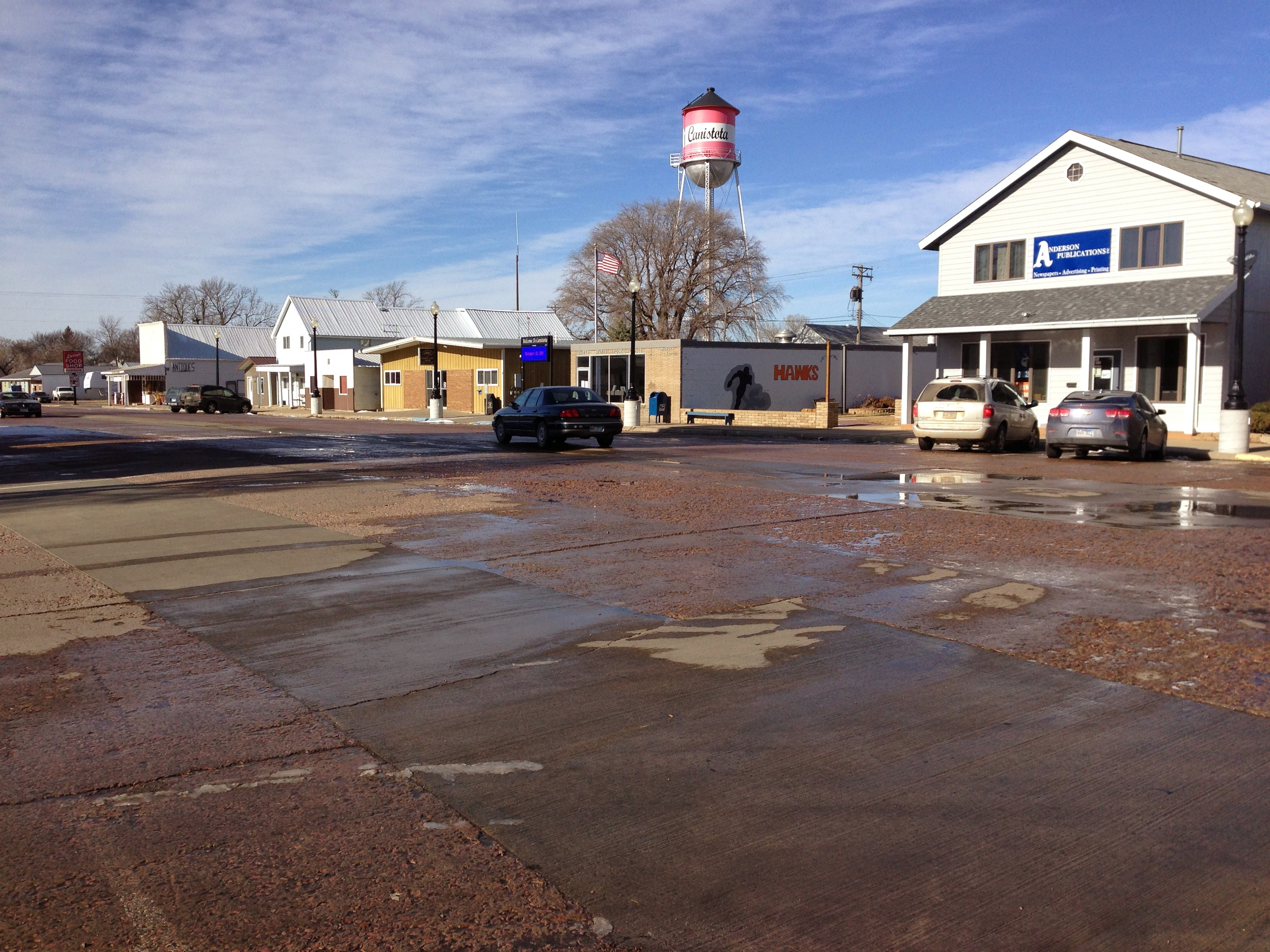
- Main Street, Canistota
- Nickname: C-Town
- Motto: "Home of the Hawks"
- Location in McCook County and the state of South Dakota
- Coordinates: 43°35′52″N 97°17′33″W
- Country: United States
- State: South Dakota
- County: McCook
- Established: 1883
- Incorporated: 1900

Area
  - Total: 0.56 sq mi (1.45 km^{2})
  - Land: 0.56 sq mi (1.45 km^{2})
  - Water: 0 sq mi (0.00 km^{2})
- Elevation: 1,549 ft (472 m)

Population (2020)
  - Total: 631
  - Density: 1,125.5/sq mi (434.54/km^{2})
- Time zone: UTC-6 (Central (CST))
  - Summer (DST): UTC-5 (CDT)
- ZIP code: 57012
- Area code: 605
- FIPS code: 46-09300
- GNIS feature ID: 1267308
- Website: City of Canistota, South Dakota

Canistota is a city in McCook County, South Dakota, United States. The population was 631 at the 2020 census. Canistota is known for chiropractic services, especially the longstanding Ortman Clinic, which attracts many Amish people from around the Midwest.

== History ==
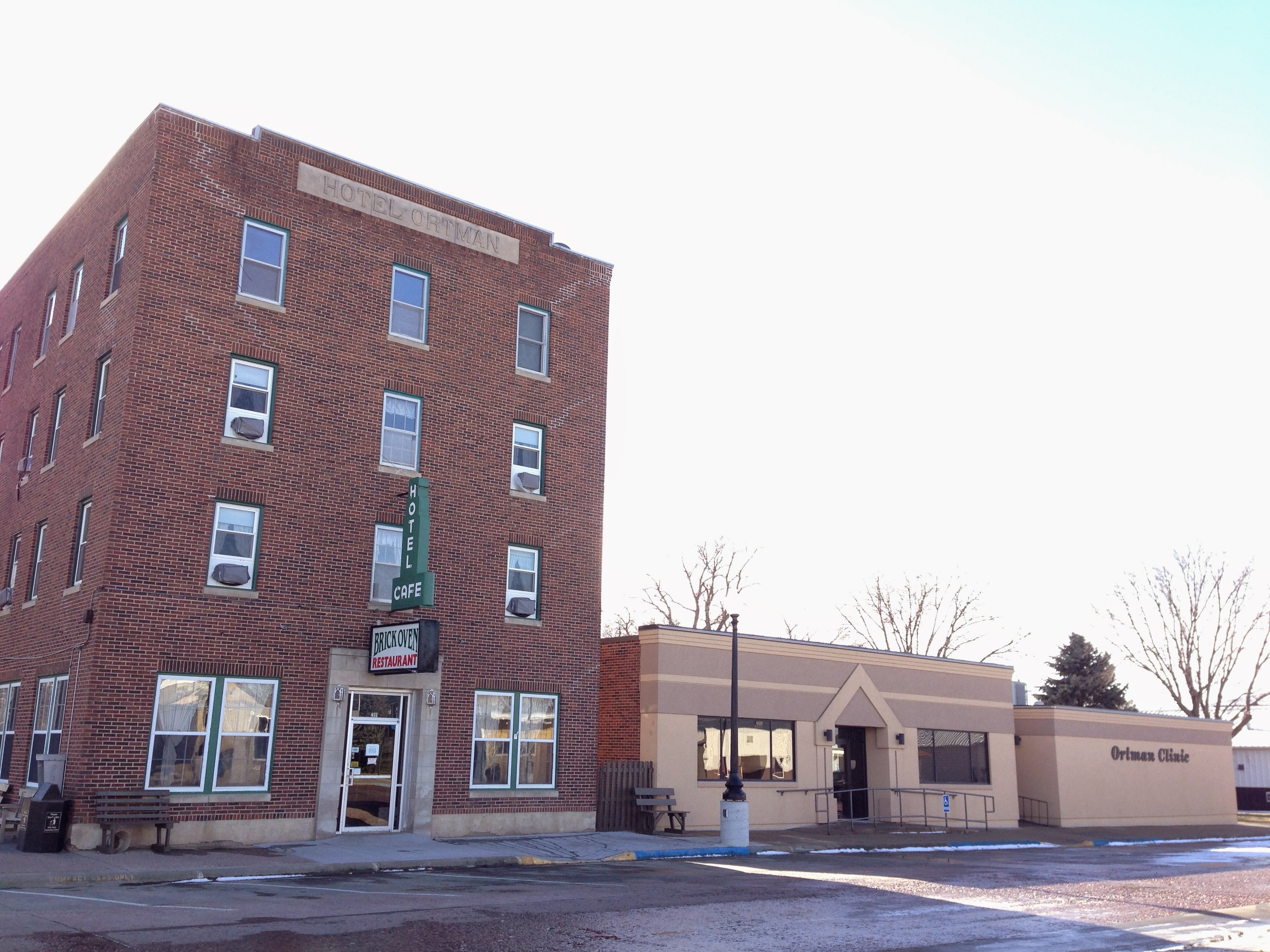
Ortman Hotel and Clinic

Canistota was named after Canastota, New York the home of a railroad official, but misspelled in the application for a post office. The city was platted in 1883. Its location is the northwest corner of Section 34, chosen by the Chicago Northwestern Railroad. Canistota incorporated in 1900.

== Geography ==
According to the United States Census Bureau, the city has a total area of 0.56 square miles (1.45 km^{2}), all land.

== Demographics ==
Historical population
Census	Pop.	Note	%±
1910	409		—
1920	594		45.2%
1930	590		−0.7%
1940	665		12.7%
1950	687		3.3%
1960	627		−8.7%
1970	636		1.4%
1980	626		−1.6%
1990	608		−2.9%
2000	700		15.1%
2010	656		−6.3%
2020	631		−3.8%
U.S. Decennial Census

=== 2020 census ===
As of the 2020 census, Canistota had a population of 631 and a median age of 40.4 years. 26.3% of residents were under the age of 18 and 19.8% of residents were 65 years of age or older.

The 2020 census recorded 90.1 males for every 100 females and 85.3 males for every 100 females age 18 and over.

All residents lived in rural areas, as the 2020 census reported 0.0% of residents in urban areas and 100.0% of residents in rural areas.

There were 228 households in Canistota, of which 32.9% had children under the age of 18 living in them, 45.6% were married-couple households, 21.9% were households with a male householder and no spouse or partner present, and 23.7% were households with a female householder and no spouse or partner present. About 30.7% of all households were made up of individuals and 15.4% had someone living alone who was 65 years of age or older.

There were 274 housing units, of which 16.8% were vacant. The homeowner vacancy rate was 5.2% and the rental vacancy rate was 7.8%.

Racial composition as of the 2020 census
Race	Number	Percent
White	559	88.6%
Black or African American	1	0.2%
American Indian and Alaska Native	21	3.3%
Asian	0	0.0%
Native Hawaiian and Other Pacific Islander	0	0.0%
Some other race	15	2.4%
Two or more races	35	5.5%
Hispanic or Latino (of any race)	21	3.3%

=== 2010 census ===
As of the census of 2010, there were 656 people, 242 households, and 159 families residing in the city. The population density was 1,171.4 inhabitants per square mile (452.3/km^{2}). There were 281 housing units at an average density of 501.8 per square mile (193.7/km^{2}). The racial makeup of the city was 95.0% White, 2.0% Native American, 0.5% Asian, 0.2% Pacific Islander, 0.9% from other races, and 1.5% from two or more races. Hispanic or Latino of any race were 2.3% of the population.

There were 242 households, of which 30.6% had children under the age of 18 living with them, 52.5% were married couples living together, 8.7% had a female householder with no husband present, 4.5% had a male householder with no wife present, and 34.3% were non-families. 28.5% of all households were made up of individuals, and 13.2% had someone living alone who was 65 years of age or older. The average household size was 2.50 and the average family size was 3.09.

The median age in the city was 43.3 years. 24.8% of residents were under the age of 18; 5.9% were between the ages of 18 and 24; 21.3% were from 25 to 44; 26.7% were from 45 to 64; and 21.3% were 65 years of age or older. The gender makeup of the city was 49.4% male and 50.6% female.

=== 2000 census ===
As of the census of 2000, there were 700 people, 254 households, and 175 families residing in the city. The population density was 1,248.4 inhabitants per square mile (482.0/km^{2}). There were 275 housing units at an average density of 490.4 per square mile (189.3/km^{2}). The racial makeup of the city was 97.86% White, 0.86% Native American, 0.29% from other races, and 1.00% from two or more races. Hispanic or Latino of any race were 0.71% of the population.

There were 254 households, out of which 35.0% had children under the age of 18 living with them, 58.3% were married couples living together, 6.7% had a female householder with no husband present, and 31.1% were non-families. 29.5% of all households were made up of individuals, and 18.9% had someone living alone who was 65 years of age or older. The average household size was 2.55 and the average family size was 3.17.

In the city, the population was spread out, with 28.0% under the age of 18, 4.9% from 18 to 24, 26.6% from 25 to 44, 16.3% from 45 to 64, and 24.3% who were 65 years of age or older. The median age was 39 years. For every 100 females, there were 90.2 males. For every 100 females age 18 and over, there were 84.6 males.

The median income for a household in the city was $31,389, and the median income for a family was $39,464. Males had a median income of $30,655 versus $19,000 for females. The per capita income for the city was $14,708. About 8.0% of families and 9.4% of the population were below the poverty line, including 6.2% of those under age 18 and 16.8% of those age 65 or over.

== Education ==
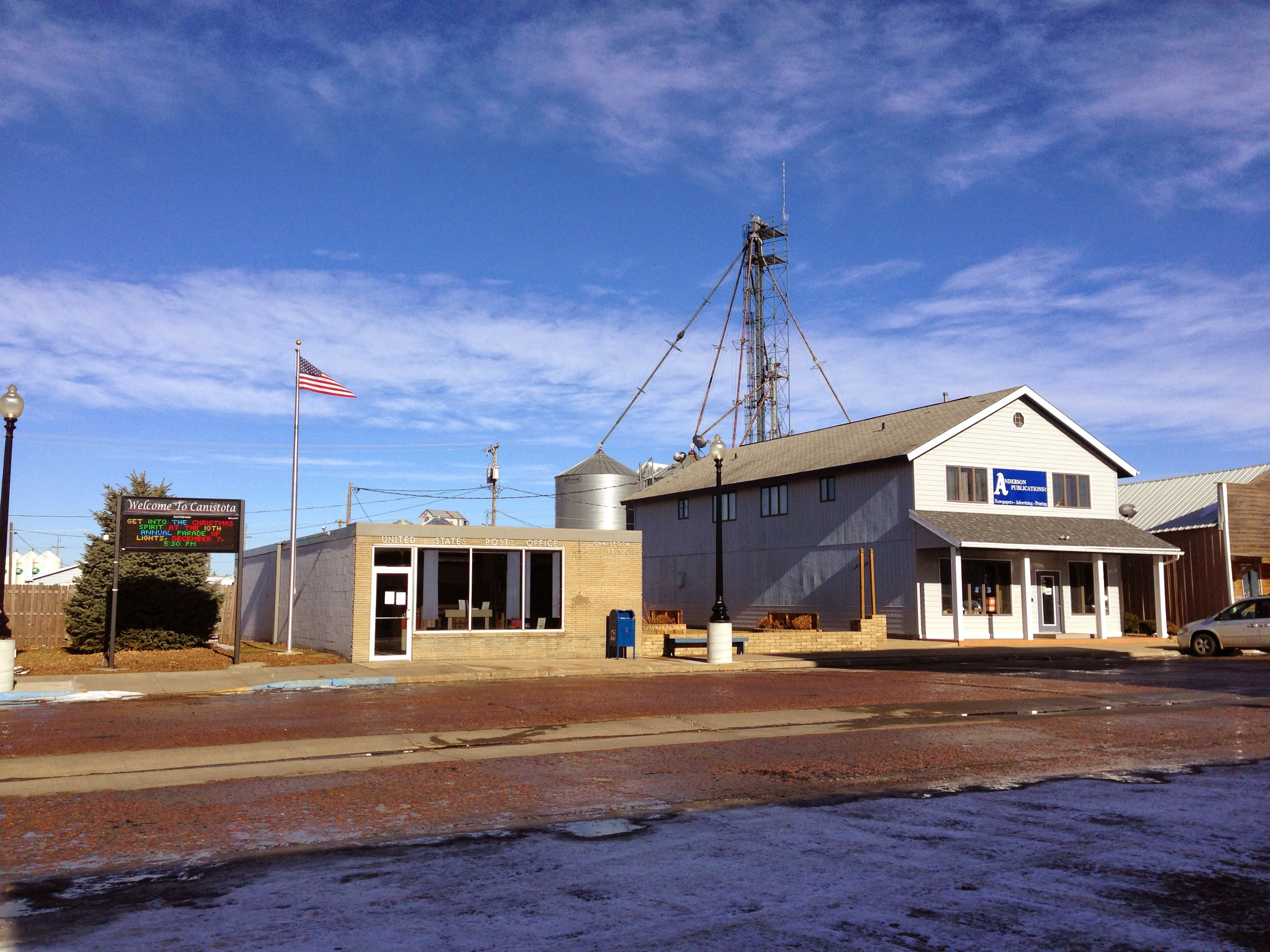
Post office and grain elevator

Canistota Public Schools belong to the Canistota School District. The Canistota School District has one elementary school that serves grades kindergarten through sixth grade, and one high school that serves seventh grade through twelfth grade.

Students attend Canistota High School.

== Notable people ==
- Charles Kostboth, legislator in the third South Dakota House of Representatives, homesteader in the early days of Canistota, and leading businessman
