= Forestburg, South Dakota =

Forestsburg, South Dakota
- Census-designated place
- Location within South Dakota Location within the United States
- Coordinates: 44°01′16″N 98°06′12″W
- Country: United States
- State: South Dakota
- County: Sanborn

Area
  - Total: 0.53 sq mi (1.37 km^{2})
  - Land: 0.53 sq mi (1.37 km^{2})
  - Water: 0 sq mi (0.00 km^{2})
- Elevation: 1,227 ft (374 m)

Population (2020)
  - Total: 54
  - Density: 101.8/sq mi (39.32/km^{2})
- Time zone: UTC-6 (Central (CST))
  - Summer (DST): UTC-5 (CDT)
- ZIP code: 57314
- Area code: 605
- FIPS code: 46-22100
- GNIS feature ID: 2584553

Forestburg is an unincorporated town and census-designated place in Sanborn County, South Dakota, United States. The population was 54 at the 2020 census.

The community was named for a tract of forest near the original town site.

== Demographics ==
Historical population
| Census | Pop. | Note | %± |
|---|---|---|---|
| 2020 | 54 | | — |
U.S. Decennial Census

== Education ==
Forestburg Public Schools are part of the Sanborn Central School District. The district includes an elementary school, middle school and high school. Students attend Sanborn Central High School.

There was previously a Forestburg 55-2 School District. In 1981 it stopped operating its own schools and began paying other school districts to teach its students. The district dissolved the following year, 1982.
