= Stephan, South Dakota =

- Unincorporated community
- Location within South Dakota Location within the United States
- Coordinates: 44°14′53″N 99°27′27″W
- Country: United States
- State: South Dakota
- County: Hyde

Area
  - Total: 0.31 sq mi (0.80 km^{2})
  - Land: 0.28 sq mi (0.72 km^{2})
  - Water: 0.035 sq mi (0.09 km^{2})
- Elevation: 1,837 ft (560 m)

Population (2020)
  - Total: 68
  - Density: 246.3/sq mi (95.08/km^{2})
- Time zone: UTC-6 (Central (CST))
  - Summer (DST): UTC-5 (CDT)
- ZIP codes: 57346
- FIPS code: 46-61580
- GNIS feature ID: 2813038

Stephan is an unincorporated community and census-designated place (CDP) in Hyde County, South Dakota, United States. Stephan has been assigned the ZIP code of 57346. The population of the CDP was 68 at the 2020 census.

Some say Stephan was named in honor of the martyred Saint Stephan, while others believe the community has the name of Monsignor J. A. Stephan, a local missionary.

The tribal K-12 school Crow Creek Tribal School, affiliated with the Bureau of Indian Education (BIE), is in the settlement.

== Demographics ==
Historical population
Census	Pop.	Note	%±
2020	68		—
U.S. Decennial Census
