= Baltic School District (South Dakota) =

School district in South Dakota, United States

Address
- 1 Bulldog Ave Baltic, South Dakota, 57003; United States

District information
- Grades: Pre-school - 12
- Superintendent: Robert Sittig
- NCES District ID: 4604680

Students and staff
- Enrollment: 458
- Faculty: 37
- Student–teacher ratio: 15.95

Other information
- Telephone: (605) 529-5464
- Website: www.balticschool.org

The Baltic School District is a public school district in Minnehaha County, based in Baltic, South Dakota.

== Schools ==
The Baltic School District has one elementary school, one middle school, and one high school.

=== Elementary schools ===
- Baltic Elementary School

=== Middle schools ===
- Baltic Middle School

=== High schools ===
- Baltic High School
