= Waverly, South Dakota =

- Census-designated place
- Location in South Dakota
- Coordinates: 44°59′55″N 96°58′27″W
- Country: United States
- State: South Dakota
- County: Codington

Area
  - Total: 1.02 sq mi (2.64 km^{2})
  - Land: 1.02 sq mi (2.64 km^{2})
  - Water: 0 sq mi (0.00 km^{2})
- Elevation: 1,988 ft (606 m)

Population (2020)
  - Total: 22
  - Density: 21.6/sq mi (8.35/km^{2})
- Time zone: UTC-6 (CST)
  - Summer (DST): UTC-5 (CDT)
- ZIP code: 57201
- Area code: 605
- FIPS code: 46-69420
- GNIS feature ID: 2628853

Waverly is an unincorporated community and census-designated place (CDP) in Codington County, South Dakota, United States. The population was 22 at the 2020 census.

The community derives its name from the Waverley Novels.

== Geography ==
Waverly is located in eastern Codington County 15 miles (24 km) northeast of Watertown, the county seat. It is 4 miles (6 km) east of Exit 185 on Interstate 29.

According to the United States Census Bureau, the Waverly CDP has a total area of 1.0 square mile (2.6 km^{2}), all land.

== Demographics ==
Historical population
Census	Pop.	Note	%±
2020	22		—
U.S. Decennial Census

== Education ==
It is in the Waverly School District 14-5.
