= Burke School District (South Dakota) =

School district in South Dakota, United States

Address
- 900 Washington St Burke, South Dakota, 57523; United States

District information
- Grades: K - 12
- Superintendent: Erik Person
- NCES District ID: 4609512

Students and staff
- Enrollment: 200
- Student–teacher ratio: 11.00

Other information
- Telephone: (605) 775-2644
- Website: www.burke.k12.sd.us

The Burke School District is a public school district in Gregory County, based in Burke, South Dakota.

== Schools ==
The Burke School District has one elementary school, one middle school, and one high school.

=== Elementary school ===
- Burke Elementary School

=== Middle school ===
- Burke Middle School

=== High school ===
- Burke High School
