= Faith School District (South Dakota) =

School district in South Dakota, United States

Address
- 503 South 2nd Ave West Faith, South Dakota, 57626; United States

District information
- Grades: K - 12
- Superintendent: Elsie Baye
- NCES District ID: 4622940

Students and staff
- Enrollment: 193
- Student–teacher ratio: 12.13

Other information
- Telephone: (605) 967-2152
- Website: www.faith.k12.sd.us

The Faith School District is a public school district in Meade County, based in Faith, South Dakota.

== Schools ==
The Faith School District has two elementary schools, one middle school, and one high school.

=== Elementary schools ===
- Faith Elementary School
- Maurine Elementary School

=== Middle school ===
- Faith Middle School

=== High school ===
- Faith High School
