= Sanborn Central School District =

School district in South Dakota, United States

Address
- 40405 Sd Hwy 34 Forestburg, South Dakota, 57314; United States

District information
- Grades: Pre-school - 12
- Superintendent: Corey Flatten
- Enrollment: 201

Other information
- Telephone: (605) 495-4183
- Website: www.sanborncentral.com

The Sanborn Central School District is a public school district in Sanborn County, based in Forestburg, South Dakota.

This district was previously known as Artesian-Letcher School District

== Schools ==
The Sanborn Central School District has one elementary school, one middle school and one high school.

=== Elementary schools ===
- Sanborn Central Elementary School

=== Middle school ===
- Sanborn Central Middle School

=== High school ===
- Sanborn Central High School
