= Dell Rapids High School =

Location
- 1216 N Garfield; Dell Rapids, South Dakota 57022; United States; 43°49′56″N 96°42′18″W

Information
- Type: Public high school
- School district: Dell Rapids School District
- Principal: Drew Bunkers
- Teaching staff: 19.24 (FTE)
- Grades: 9-12
- Enrollment: 315 (2024–2025)
- Student to teacher ratio: 16.37
- Colors: Orange & Black
- Nickname: Quarriers
- Website: drhs.dr-k12.org/o/drhs

Dell Rapids High School is a high school located in Dell Rapids, South Dakota. Their athletics teams are known as the Quarriers.
