= Garretson School District =

School district in South Dakota, United States

Address
- 505 2nd St Garretson, South Dakota, 57030; United States

District information
- Grades: Pre-school - 12
- Superintendent: Robert Arend
- NCES District ID: 4626370

Students and staff
- Enrollment: 554
- Student–teacher ratio: 14.49
- District mascot: Blue Dragons

Other information
- Telephone: (605) 594-3451
- Website: www.garretson.k12.sd.us

The Garretson School District is a public school district in Minnehaha County, based in Garretson, South Dakota.

== Schools ==
The Garretson School District has one elementary school, one middle school, and one high school.

=== Elementary school ===
- Garretson elemantry

=== Middle school ===
- Garretson Middle School

=== High school ===
- Garretson High School
