= Garretson, South Dakota =

- City
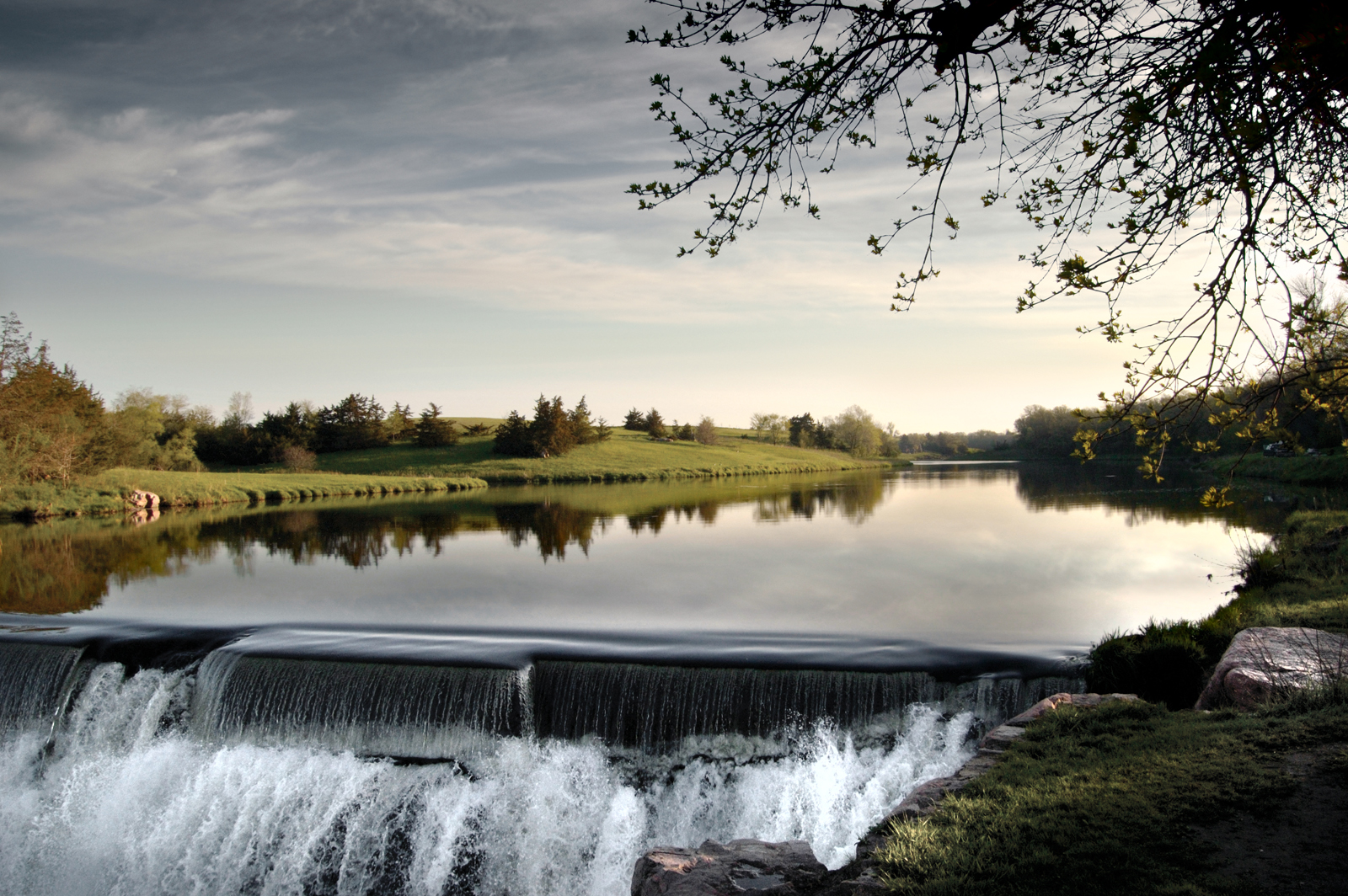
- Split Rock Park

- Logo
- Nickname: "City of Parks"
- Location in Minnehaha County and the state of South Dakota
- Coordinates: 43°42′55″N 96°30′01″W
- Country: United States
- State: South Dakota
- County: Minnehaha
- Incorporated: 1891

Area
  - Total: 1.50 sq mi (3.89 km^{2})
  - Land: 1.46 sq mi (3.77 km^{2})
  - Water: 0.042 sq mi (0.11 km^{2})
- Elevation: 1,486 ft (453 m)

Population (2020)
  - Total: 1,228
  - Density: 843.4/sq mi (325.65/km^{2})
- Time zone: UTC−6 (Central (CST))
  - Summer (DST): UTC−5 (CDT)
- ZIP code: 57030
- Area code: 605
- FIPS code: 46-23820
- GNIS feature ID: 1267400
- Website: cityofgarretson.com/

Garretson is a city in Minnehaha County, South Dakota, United States. The city had a population of 1,228 at the 2020 census.

== History ==
The city has the name of A. S. Garretson, a local banker.

== Geography ==
According to the United States Census Bureau, the city has a total area of 1.49 square miles (3.86 km^{2}), of which 1.45 square miles (3.76 km^{2}) is land and 0.04 square miles (0.10 km^{2}) is water.

== Demographics ==
Historical population
Census	Pop.	Note	%±
1890	341		—
1900	500		46.6%
1910	668		33.6%
1920	715		7.0%
1930	655		−8.4%
1940	666		1.7%
1950	745		11.9%
1960	850		14.1%
1970	847		−0.4%
1980	963		13.7%
1990	924		−4.0%
2000	1,165		26.1%
2010	1,166		0.1%
2020	1,228		5.3%
U.S. Decennial Census

=== 2020 census ===
As of the 2020 census, Garretson had a population of 1,228. The median age was 38.1 years; 25.0% of residents were under the age of 18 and 17.3% were 65 years of age or older. For every 100 females there were 95.2 males, and for every 100 females age 18 and over there were 92.7 males age 18 and over.

0.0% of residents lived in urban areas, while 100.0% lived in rural areas.

There were 482 households in Garretson, of which 31.5% had children under the age of 18 living in them. Of all households, 50.6% were married-couple households, 17.8% were households with a male householder and no spouse or partner present, and 23.7% were households with a female householder and no spouse or partner present. About 30.1% of all households were made up of individuals and 14.1% had someone living alone who was 65 years of age or older.

There were 505 housing units, of which 4.6% were vacant. The homeowner vacancy rate was 1.6% and the rental vacancy rate was 4.5%.

Racial composition as of the 2020 census
Race	Number	Percent
White	1,126	91.7%
Black or African American	6	0.5%
American Indian and Alaska Native	21	1.7%
Asian	1	0.1%
Native Hawaiian and Other Pacific Islander	0	0.0%
Some other race	8	0.7%
Two or more races	66	5.4%
Hispanic or Latino (of any race)	31	2.5%

=== 2010 census ===
As of the census of 2010, there were 1,166 people, 449 households, and 308 families living in the city. The population density was 804.1 inhabitants per square mile (310.5/km^{2}). There were 476 housing units at an average density of 328.3 per square mile (126.8/km^{2}). The racial makeup of the city was 98.5% White, 0.3% African American, 0.3% Native American, and 0.6% from two or more races (Mulatto, Eurasian, mixed races) Hispanic or Latino of any race were 0.3% of the population.

There were 449 households, of which 38.5% had children under the age of 18 living with them, 53.9% were married couples living together, 10.7% had a female householder with no husband present, 4.0% had a male householder with no wife present, and 31.4% were non-families. 26.9% of all households were made up of individuals, and 12.9% had someone living alone who was 65 years of age or older. The average household size was 2.48 and the average family size was 3.03.

The median age in the city was 38.1 years. 28.6% of residents were under the age of 18; 5% were between the ages of 18 and 24; 26.4% were from 25 to 44; 24.8% were from 45 to 64; and 15.2% were 65 years of age or older. The gender makeup of the city was 47.0% male and 53.0% female.

=== 2000 census ===
As of the census of 2000, there were 1,165 people, 427 households, and 313 families living in the city. The population density was 786.9 inhabitants per square mile (303.8/km^{2}). There were 458 housing units at an average density of 309.4 per square mile (119.5/km^{2}). The racial makeup of the city was 97.60% White, 0.26% African American, 0.94% Native American, 0.09% Asian, 0.26% from other races, and 0.86% from two or more races. Hispanic or Latino of any race were 0.52% of the population.

There were 427 households, out of which 39.1% had children under the age of 18 living with them, 59.0% were married couples living together, 9.4% had a female householder with no husband present, and 26.5% were non-families. 24.4% of all households were made up of individuals, and 13.1% had someone living alone who was 65 years of age or older. The average household size was 2.59 and the average family size was 3.04.

In the city, the population was spread out, with 28.2% under the age of 18, 6.7% from 18 to 24, 29.3% from 25 to 44, 17.0% from 45 to 64, and 18.8% who were 65 years of age or older. The median age was 37 years. For every 100 females, there were 87.3 males. For every 100 females age 18 and over, there were 89.1 males.

As of 2000 the median income for a household in the city was $39,352, and the median income for a family was $46,389. Males had a median income of $32,212 versus $21,824 for females. The per capita income for the city was $16,981. About 3.1% of families and 4.6% of the population were below the poverty line, including 3.8% of those under age 18 and 10.7% of those age 65 or over.

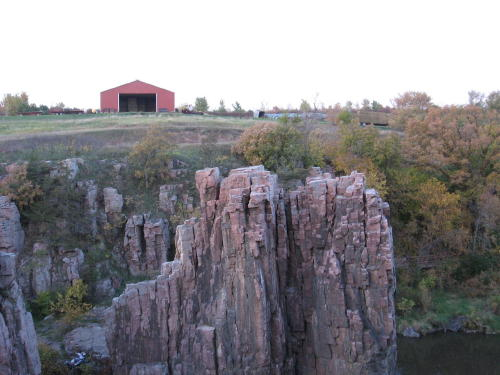
Rock Climber and cliff in Palisades State Park, Garretson

== Points of interest ==
Garretson is home to Devil's Gulch, the site where Jesse James allegedly escaped a posse after robbing the First National Bank in Northfield, Minnesota.

Palisades State Park is also near Garretson.

== Education ==
Garretson Public Schools are part of the Garretson School District (South Dakota). The Garretson School District has one elementary school, one middle school, and one high school.
