= National Register of Historic Places listings in Moody County, South Dakota =

Location of Moody County in South Dakota

This is a list of the National Register of Historic Places listings in Moody County, South Dakota.

This is intended to be a complete list of the properties on the National Register of Historic Places in Moody County, South Dakota, United States. The locations of National Register properties for which the latitude and longitude coordinates are included below, may be seen in a map.

There are 16 properties listed on the National Register in the county. Another 3 properties were once listed but have been removed.

This National Park Service list is complete through NPS recent listings posted March 14, 2025.

== Current listings ==
	Name on the Register	Image	Date listed	Location	City or town	Description
1	Crystal Theatre	Crystal Theatre	October 12, 2000 (#00001214)	215 E. 2nd Ave. 44°02′57″N 96°35′32″W	Flandreau	
2	Frank and Sarah Drake Claim House		January 21, 2015 (#14001184)	23982 466th Ave. 43°54′32″N 96°53′18″W	Chester	
3	Egan Park	Egan Park	June 19, 2003 (#03000556)	2nd St. 43°59′58″N 96°38′18″W	Egan	
4	George Few House	George Few House	August 18, 1983 (#83003017)	208 1st Ave., E. 44°03′03″N 96°35′32″W	Flandreau	
5	First Presbyterian Church and Cemetery	First Presbyterian Church and Cemetery	July 31, 2017 (#100001402)	22712 Highway 13; 44°04′06″N 96°35′08″W	Flandreau	
6	First Scandinavian Baptist Church		August 16, 2000 (#00000999)	2.5 miles south of Trent; 43°52′15″N 96°38′41″W	Trent	
7	Flandreau Masonic Temple	Flandreau Masonic Temple	October 19, 1989 (#89001725)	300 E. 2nd Ave. 44°02′59″N 96°35′27″W	Flandreau	
8	Japanese Gardens Dance Pavilion	Japanese Gardens Dance Pavilion	December 1, 1994 (#94001390)	City park 44°03′15″N 96°34′00″W	Flandreau	
9	Little Village Farm Sale Barn		December 14, 1995 (#95001469)	Off U.S. Route 77 northeast of Dell Rapids; 43°54′24″N 96°41′18″W	Dell Rapids	
10	Moody County Courthouse	Moody County Courthouse	February 10, 1993 (#92001863)	Pipestone Ave. between Crescent and Wind Sts. 44°02′53″N 96°35′38″W	Flandreau	
11	Pettigrew Barns		May 19, 2004 (#04000473)	309 E. Broad; 44°02′41″N 96°35′26″W	Flandreau	
12	St. Mary's Episcopal Church	St. Mary's Episcopal Church	September 13, 2001 (#01000998)	North Crescent St. 44°03′29″N 96°35′38″W	Flandreau	
13	St. Vincent's Hotel	St. Vincent's Hotel	January 27, 1983 (#83003018)	100 N. Wind; 44°02′55″N 96°35′44″W	Flandreau	
14	South Dakota Department of Transportation Bridge No. 51-051-000		January 14, 2000 (#99001699)	Local road over the Big Sioux River; 44°11′44″N 96°47′04″W	Lake Campbell Resort	Lost between 2007 and 2009
15	South Dakota Department of Transportation Bridge No. 51-102-010		January 14, 2000 (#99001693)	Local road over Local Creek; 44°10′54″N 96°41′18″W	Riverview Township	
16	South Dakota Dept. of Trans. Br. No. 51-124-136	South Dakota Dept. of Trans. Br. No. 51-124-136	February 9, 2001 (#01000090)	2nd St. over the Big Sioux River; 43°59′54″N 96°38′19″W	Egan	

== Former listings ==
	Name on the Register	Image	Date listed	Date removed	Location	City or town	Description
1	Sioux River Bridge		January 14, 2000 (#99001696)	March 26, 2008	3rd Street over Big Sioux River	Trent	
2	South Dakota Dept. of Trans. Br. No. 51-140-078		January 14, 2000 (#99001698)	March 26, 2008	Local Road over Big Sioux River	Flandreau	
3	Ward Hall		November 8, 2001 (#01001223)	November 18, 2009	Main Street; 44°09′17″N 96°27′35″W	Ward	

== See also ==
- List of National Historic Landmarks in South Dakota
- National Register of Historic Places listings in South Dakota
