= Crystal Theater =

Crystal Theater and Crystal Theatre may refer to:

in England

- Crystal Theatre (Bristol, England), a theater that is home to one of Bristol's record labels

in the United States

- Crystal Theatre (Los Angeles, California) at 247 S. Main Street, remodeled as a bar and club
- Crystal Theater (Dublin, Georgia), now home to the restaurant Deano's
- Crystal Theater (Crystal Falls, Michigan)
- Crystal Theatre (Elko, Nevada) on Commercial Street in Elko, Nevada
- Crystal Theatre (Okemah, Oklahoma)
- Crystal Theatre (Flandreau, South Dakota)
- Crystal Theatre (Gonzales, Texas)

== See also ==
- Dixie Crystal Theatre, Clewiston, Florida
