= South Dakota Highway 32 =

State highway in South Dakota, United States

Highway 32

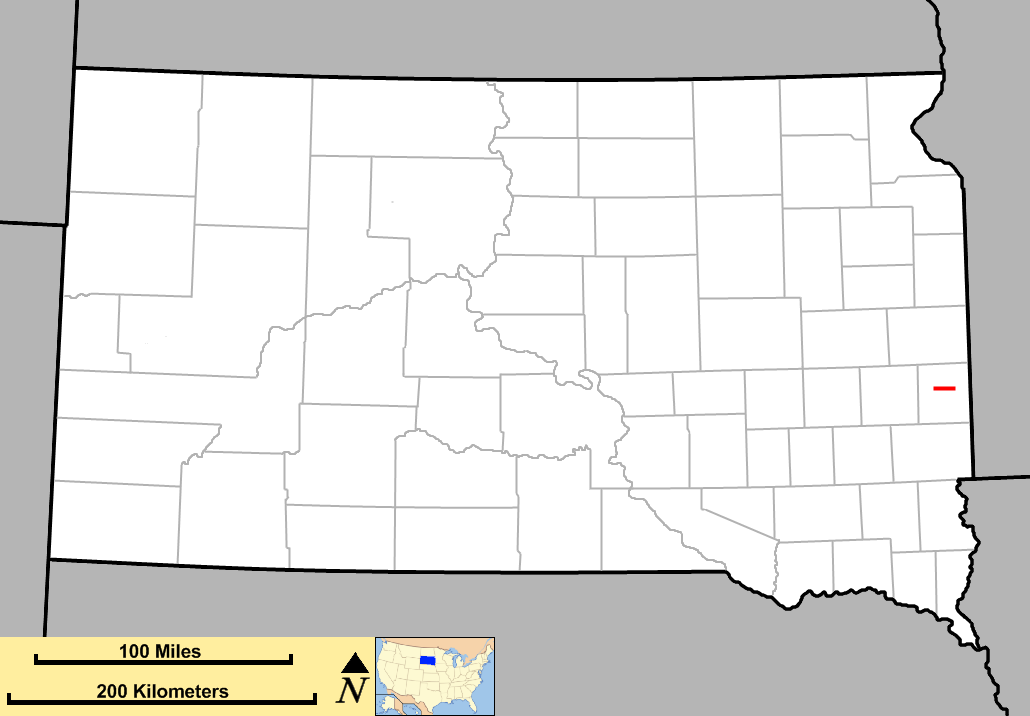
- Map of South Dakota with SD 32 in red

Route information
- Maintained by SDDOT
- Length: 8.643 mi (13.910 km)
- Existed: c. 1970–present

Major junctions
- West end: I-29 north-northwest of Colman
- East end: SD 13 in Flandreau

Location
- Country: United States
- State: South Dakota
- Counties: Moody

Highway system
- South Dakota State Trunk Highway System; Interstate; US; State
← SD 30	→ SD 34

South Dakota Highway 32 (SD 32) is a 8.643-mile-long (13.910 km) state highway in Moody County, South Dakota, United States, connecting Interstate 29 (I-29) with Flandreau.

== Route description ==
SD 32 begins at an interchange with I-29 approximately 5 miles (8.0 km) north-northeast of Colman, in the west-central part of Moody County. This intersection is just northeast of the Sioux Prairie Preserve. At this intersection, the roadway continues to the west as 230th Street. SD 32 takes 230th Street to the east. Just west of 475th Avenue, it crosses over Squaw Creek. East of 478th Avenue, it curves to the east-southeast. Just east of 479th Avenue, it crosses over the Big Sioux River and then enters the northwestern part of Flandreau. An intersection with Industrial Road leads to the Flandreau city office. The highway then curves back to the east. It intersects 12th Street, which leads to the Flandreau public schools, county resource center, aquatic center, and community center. Between Wind and Crescent streets, the highway passes the Moody County Courthouse. An intersection with Prairie Street leads to the Flandreau Medical Center. Just east of Lindsay Street, it intersects SD 13 (Summit Street). Here, SD 32 ends, and Pipestone Avenue continues to the east, leading to the Moody County Museum, Flandreau City Park, and the Flandreau Park Golf Course.

No segment of SD 32 is included as part of the National Highway System, a system of routes determined to be the important for the nation's economy, mobility and defense.

== History ==
The original SD 32 was established in the late 1940s, from SD 45 near Gann Valley to US 81 east of Oldham. By 1954, the section from SD 45 to SD 25 was cancelled, shortening the west end to SD 25. Between 1965 and 1970, SD 32 was cancelled, and the current SD 32 was established. The current SD 32 has remained unchanged since.

== Major intersections ==
The entire route is in Moody County.

Location	mi	km	Destinations	Notes
	0.000– 0.162	0.000– 0.261	I-29 / 230th Street west – Sioux Falls, Brookings	Western terminus of SD 32; roadway continues to the west as 230th Street; I-29 exit 114.
Flandreau	8.643	13.910	SD 13 south (Summit Street) – SD 34, Elkton; Pipestone Avenue east	Eastern terminus; roadway continues to the east as Pipestone Avenue.
1.000 mi = 1.609 km; 1.000 km = 0.621 mi

== See also ==
- List of state highways in South Dakota
