= Almeda =

Almeda may refer to:

== People ==
- Almeda Abazi (born 1992), Albanian actress and model
- Almeda C. Adams (1865–1949), American musician
- Almeda Eliza Hitchcock (1863–1895), American lawyer
- Almeda Lambert (1863–1921), American cookbook writer and businessperson
- Almeda Riddle (1898–1986), American folk singer
- Almeda Sperry (1879–1957), American anarchist
- Almeda Jones St. Clair (1868–1952), American indigenous educator

== Other ==
- Almeda, Houston, Texas
- Almeda University, an unaccredited institution
- "Almeda" (song), a 2019 song by Solange Knowles
- Almeda (Barcelona Metro), a metro station in Cornellà de Llobregat
- Almeda, Cornellà de Llobregat, a neighbourhood of Cornellà de Llobregat, in the metropolitan area of Barcelona
- Almeda (album), a 2004 album by Cecil Taylor

== See also ==
- Almeida (disambiguation)
