= South Dakota Highway 13 =

State highway in South Dakota, United States

Highway 13

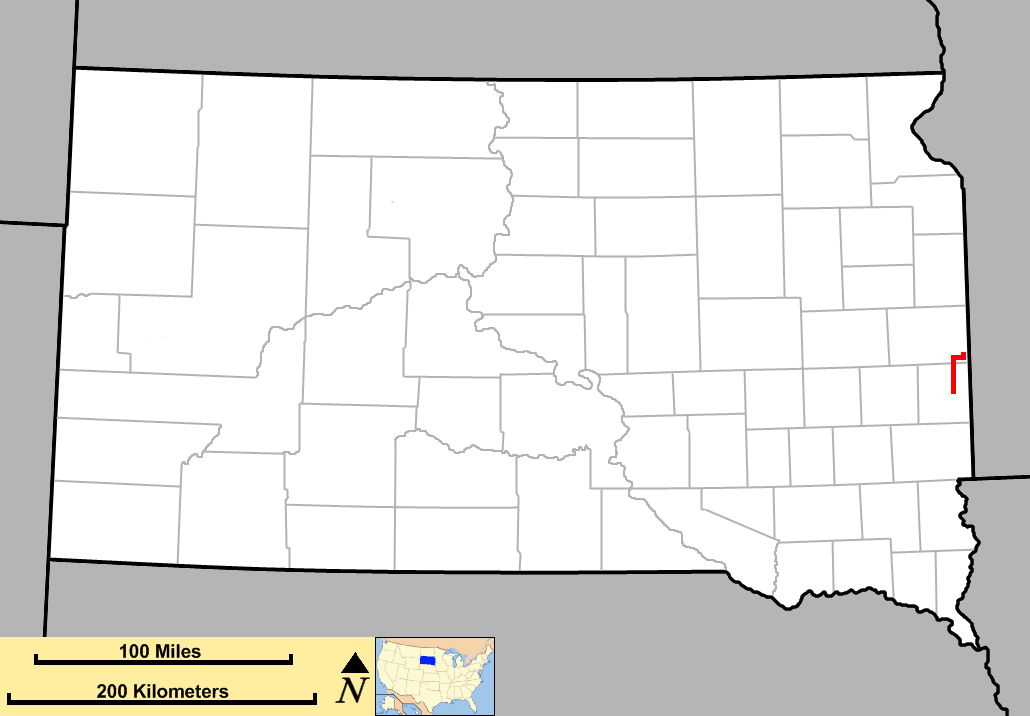
- Map of South Dakota with SD 13 in red

Route information
- Maintained by SDDOT
- Length: 23.891 mi (38.449 km)

Major junctions
- South end: SD 34 east of Egan
- SD 32 in Flandreau; SD 324 west of Elkton
- North end: US 14 north of Elkton

Location
- Country: United States
- State: South Dakota
- Counties: Moody; Brookings

Highway system
- South Dakota State Trunk Highway System; Interstate; US; State
| ← SD 12 | → US 14 |

South Dakota Highway 13 (SD 13) is a 23.835-mile-long (38.359 km) state highway in Moody and Brookings counties in the U.S. state of South Dakota. It connects Flandreau with Elkton. SD 13 was originally part of SD 11's path.

== Route description ==
=== Moody County ===
SD 13 begins at an intersection with SD 34 (233rd Street) east of Egan, in the east-central part of Moody County. Here, the roadway continues to the south as 481st Avenue. This intersection is just northeast of Flandreau Municipal Airport. SD 13 travels to the north-northwest on 481st Avenue. North of 231st Street, it enters Flandreau. At Pipeston Avenue, the highway intersects the eastern terminus of SD 32. This highway leads to the business district of Flandreau. SD 13 crosses over the Big Sioux River and then leaves the city. 229th Street, just north of the city, leads to Flandreau Indian School. Here, the highway enters Flandreau Indian Reservation. Just before 228th Street is a second crossing of this river. Just north of 227th Street, the highway leaves the reservation. Between 226th and 224th Street is a crossing of Spring Creek.

=== Brookings County ===
At 220th Street, the highway enters the southeastern part of Brookings County. North of 218th Street, the highway begins to curve to the east, with 481st Avenue splitting off to the north. It intersects the eastern terminus of SD 324. At about the 484th Avenue intersection, SD 13 curves to the east-northeast. It then begins to skirt along the northwestern edge of Elkton. Between 485th Avenue and North Drive, the highway crosses over some railroad tracks of Union Pacific Railroad. It then curves to the north, onto 486th Avenue. Just north of 216th Street is a crossing of Medary Creek. Just south of 215th Street, the highway begins a curve to the north-northeast. It then reaches its northern terminus, an intersection with U.S. Route 14 (US 14).

== History ==
SD 13 was formerly a segment of SD 11. This was changed to SD 13 between 1932 and 1935. At that time, its original northern terminus was extended eastward to its current location at US 14 north of Elkton. This was due to a rerouting of US 14 in the early 1930s.

== Major intersections ==
| County | Location | mi | km | Destinations | Notes |
|---|---|---|---|---|---|
| Moody | | 0.000 | 0.000 | SD 34 / 481st Avenue south – I-29, Pipestone, Egan | Southern terminus; roadway continues as 481st Avenue. |
| Moody | Flandreau | 2.834 | 4.561 | SD 32 west (Pipestone Avenue) – Business district, City park and golf course, Museum | Eastern terminus of SD 32; leads to Flandreau City Park, Flandreau Park Golf Course, Moody County Museum, and Avera Flandreau Medical Center |
| Moody–Brookings county line | | 16.898 | 27.195 | 220th Street | |
| Brookings | | 17.110 | 27.536 | SD 324 west – I-29 | Eastern terminus of SD 324 |
| Brookings | | 23.891 | 38.449 | US 14 – Brookings, Lake Benton | Northern terminus |
1.000 mi = 1.609 km; 1.000 km = 0.621 mi

== See also ==
- List of state highways in South Dakota
