= South Dakota Highway 324 =

State highway in South Dakota, United States

Highway 324
- 217th Street
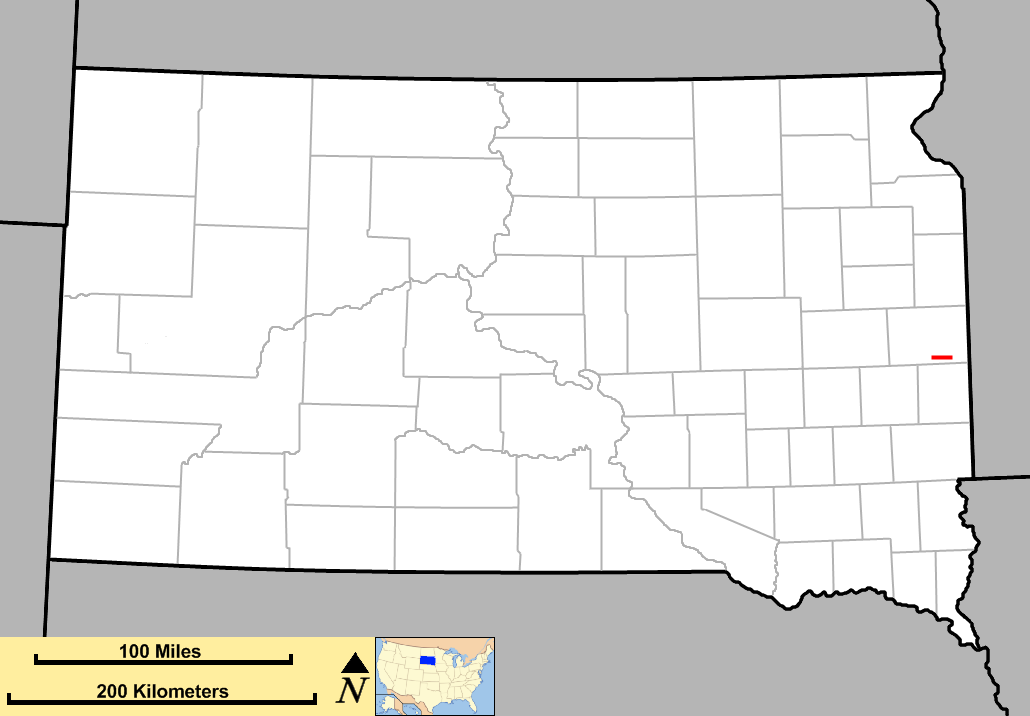
- Route of SD 324 (in red)

Route information
- Maintained by SDDOT
- Length: 8.680 mi (13.969 km)
- Existed: 1997–present

Major junctions
- West end: I-29 south of Brookings
- East end: SD 13 west of Elkton

Location
- Country: United States
- State: South Dakota
- Counties: Brookings

Highway system
- South Dakota State Trunk Highway System; Interstate; US; State
← SD 314	→ SD 377

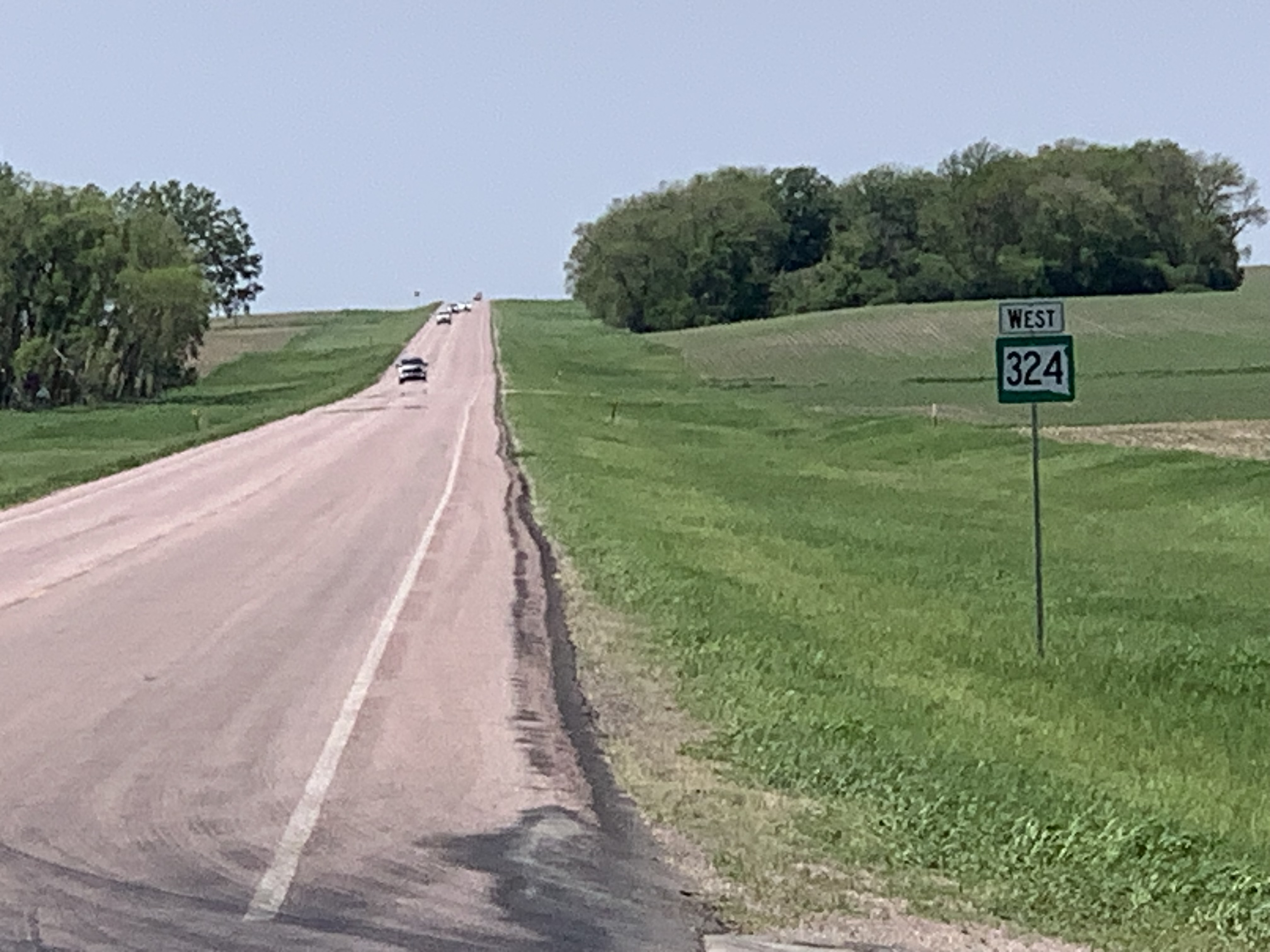
South Dakota Highway 324

South Dakota Highway 324 (SD 324) is a 8.680-mile-long (13.969 km) state highway in the east-central part of the U.S. state of South Dakota. It links Interstate 29 (I-29) south of Brookings with SD 13 west of Elkton. It was commissioned in 1997, along what was formerly named State Highway 218, which itself followed an old routing of U.S. Route 14 (US 14). The renumbering was done to avoid confusion with the parallel 218th Street.

== Route description ==
SD 324 travels east as 217th Street, intersecting both County Road 21 (CR 21) and (CR 23). The highway ends after a few miles at SD 13.

== Major intersections ==
The entire route is in Brookings County.

Location	mi	km	Destinations	Notes
Trenton Township	0.000	0.000	I-29 / 217th Street west – Sioux Falls, Brookings	Western terminus of SD 324; eastern terminus of CR 24
Parnell Township	8.680	13.969	SD 13 – Elkton, Flandreau	Eastern terminus
1.000 mi = 1.609 km; 1.000 km = 0.621 mi
