= Pleasant Valley Colony, South Dakota =

- Census-designated place
- Location within South Dakota Location within the United States
- Coordinates: 44°03′30″N 96°28′14″W
- Country: United States
- State: South Dakota
- County: Moody

Area
  - Total: 0.51 sq mi (1.31 km^{2})
  - Land: 0.49 sq mi (1.28 km^{2})
  - Water: 0.012 sq mi (0.03 km^{2})
- Elevation: 1,641 ft (500 m)

Population (2020)
  - Total: 6
  - Density: 12.1/sq mi (4.69/km^{2})
- Time zone: UTC-6 (Central (CST))
  - Summer (DST): UTC-5 (CDT)
- ZIP Code: 57028 (Flandreau)
- Area code: 605
- FIPS code: 46-50988
- GNIS feature ID: 2813056

Pleasant Valley Colony is a census-designated place (CDP) and Hutterite colony in Moody County, South Dakota, United States. The population was 6 at the 2020 census. It was first listed as a CDP prior to the 2020 census.

It is in the eastern part of the county, 7 miles (11 km) east of Flandreau, the county seat, and 12 miles (19 km) by road northwest of Pipestone, Minnesota.

== Demographics ==
Historical population
Census	Pop.	Note	%±
2020	6		—
U.S. Decennial Census

== Education ==
It is in the Flandreau School District.

The district has Pleasant Valley Colony School as a K-8 school. Flandreau High School is the district comprehensive high school.
