= William Loucks =

William Loucks may refer to:

- William John Loucks, member of the House of Commons of Canada
- William H. Loucks, member of the South Dakota House of Representatives
