= Clare Township, South Dakota =

Community in South Dakota, United States

Clare Township
- Civil township
- Location within the state of South Dakota
- Coordinates: 44°03′56″N 096°41′18″W
- Country: United States
- State: South Dakota
- County: Moody
- Elevation: 1,923 ft (586 m)
- Time zone: UTC-6 (Central (CST))
  - Summer (DST): UTC-5 (CDT)
- ZIP codes: 57024, 57028
- Area code: 605

Clare Township is a township and census designated place in Moody County, South Dakota, United States. Clare is located approximately 5.5 miles (8.9 km) northwest of Flandreau.
