= Flandreau Santee Sioux Tribe =

Tribe of Santee Dakota people

The Flandreau Santee Sioux Tribe (Dakota: Wakpa Ipakṡaƞ oyáte) are a federally recognized tribe of Santee Dakota people. Their reservation is the Flandreau Indian Reservation. The tribe are members of the Mdewakantonwan people, one of the sub-tribes of the Isanti (Santee) Dakota originally from central Minnesota.

In 1934, the Tribe was recognized under the Indian Reorganization Act of 1934. Today the Flandreau Santee Sioux Reservation is located on 2,500 acres (10 km^{2}) of land in South Dakota. Notable tribal member Chief Little Crow participated in the Dakota War of 1862.

== Tribal information ==
- Reservation: Flandreau Reservation; in Moody County, South Dakota
- Division: Santee
- Bands: Mdewakanton, Wahpekute
- Land Area: 5000 acres (without boundaries)
- Tribal Headquarters: Flandreau, South Dakota
- Time Zone: Central
- Traditional Language: Dakota
- Enrolled members living on reservation: 726
- Major Employers: Flandreau Indian School, Flandreau Santee Sioux Tribe, Royal River Casino

== Tribal government ==
- Charter: Yes; Constitution and Bylaws: Yes - IRA
- Date Approved: April 24, 1936
- Name of Governing Body: Flandreau Santee Sioux Tribal Council
- Executive Committee: (4) President, Vice-President, Secretary, Treasurer and 4 additional Trustees who are elected by the tribal members. Tribal Treasurer is appointed.
- Dates of Constitutional amendments: October 16, 1967, November 14, 1984, May 23, 1990, May 13, 1997

== Tribal elections ==
- Primary Election is at least forty-five days prior to the general election and General Election is held in conjunction with the August General Council meeting.
- Number of Election districts or communities: 1
- Executive Officers and Trustees serve four year terms. Trustee terms of office are staggered.

== Tribal council meetings ==
- Quorum number: Executive Committee: 4 Executive members.
- General Council meetings must have fifty percent of qualified voters. General Council meeting are the first Saturday of February, May, August, and November of each year. Executive Committee holds meetings at least once a month established by the President.

== Education and media ==
- Newspaper: Moody County Enterprise, Flandreau, South Dakota

== Notable tribal members ==
- Chief Little Crow (1810-1863) spent much of his life in Minnesota, where he was the head of a Santee band. Little Crow, a bold and passionate orator, established himself as a spokesman for his people. After becoming chief around 1834, he sought justice for his people, but also tried to maintain relations with the whites. In 1862, he led the fight now known as the Minnesota Santee Conflict. In fact, this war was launched only in the face of starvation and only after the federal government didn't present land payments as promised. Little Crow was killed the following year. He is buried near Flandreau.

== Legalization of cannabis ==
In mid-2015, the Tribe stated their intent to begin growing cannabis on one authorized site on their reservation, and commence selling the product on 1 January 2016, following a vote of tribal authorities which decided 5–1 to legalize cannabis.
