= Lone Rock Township =

Lone Rock Township may refer to:

- Lone Rock Township, Baxter County, Arkansas, in Baxter County, Arkansas
- Lone Rock Township, Moody County, South Dakota, in Moody County, South Dakota
