= Flandreau Public Schools =

School district in South Dakota, United States

Flandreau School District 50-3 , also known as Flandreau Public Schools, is a school district headquartered in Flandreau, South Dakota.

The district, in Moody County, includes Flandreau, Trent, Ward, and Pleasant Valley Colony.

It operates an elementary school, a middle school, and a high school.

== History ==
In 1932, there were 23 teachers and 545 students. Due to that year due to budgeting issues, the district ended music and physical education at the grade school level.

In 2001 the district had a rule that stated that a student who had not taken a full final semester at the high school cannot participate in the graduation ceremony. A students responded by trying to get the rule changed via a lawsuit.

In 2016 the Flandreau Santee Sioux Tribe announced that it would give $50,000 to the school district.

In 2018 the district approved a budget.

In November 2020, during the COVID-19 pandemic in South Dakota, the district began requiring all students to do online learning.

== Schools ==
Schools include:

- Flandreau High School
- Flandreau Middle School
- Flandreau Elementary School
- Pleasant Valley Colony School (K-8 school)

== Athletics ==
In 2018 it began a wrestling cooperative with Colman-Egan High School.
