= Brookfield Creek =

Stream in South Dakota, U.S.

Coordinates: 43°53′21″N 96°39′03″W

Brookfield Creek is a tributary of the Big Sioux River in the U.S. state of South Dakota. It is also referred to as No Name Creek by the South Dakota Legislature.

Brookfield Creek is named after a nearby town formerly known as Brookfield. The town changed its name to Trent in 1886 to avoid confusion with another town named Brookfield on the Milwaukee Railroad line.

== See also ==
- List of rivers of South Dakota
