= Flandreau Indian Reservation =

Coordinates: 44°05′10″N 96°35′24″W

Flandreau Santee Sioux Indian Reservation
- Indian reservation
- Location of Flandreau Santee Sioux Reservation
- Tribe: Flandreau Santee Sioux
- Country: United States
- State: South Dakota
- County: Moody
- Headquarters: Flandreau

Area
  - Total: 9.5 km^{2} (3.68 sq mi)
- Website: Flandreau Santee Sioux Tribe

The Flandreau Indian Reservation is an Indian reservation, belonging to the federally recognized Flandreau Santee Sioux Tribe of South Dakota. They are Santee Dakota people, part of the Sioux tribe of Native Americans. The reservation is located in Flandreau Township in central Moody County in eastern South Dakota, near the city of Flandreau.

== Tribal information ==
- Reservation: Flandreau Santee Sioux Reservation
- Division: Santee
- Bands: Mdewakanton, Wahpekute
- Land Area: Approximately 2,356 acres (3.68 sq miles) (without boundaries)
- Tribal Headquarters: Flandreau, SD
- Time Zone: Central
- Traditional Language: Dakota
- Enrolled members living on reservation: 726
- Major Employers: Royal River Casino, Flandreau Santee Sioux Tribe, Flandreau Indian School

== Government ==
- Charter: Yes; Constitution and Bylaws: Yes - non-IRA
- Date Approved: April 24, 1936
- Name of Governing Body: Flandreau Santee Sioux Tribal Council
- Executive Committee: (4) President, Vice-President, Secretary, Treasurer, and 4 additional Trustees who are elected by the tribal members. Tribal Treasurer is appointed.
- Dates of Constitutional amendments: October 16, 1967, November 14, 1984, May 23, 1990, May 13, 1997

== Elections ==
- Primary election is at least forty-five days prior to the general election and General Election is held in conjunction with the August General Council meeting.
- Number of Election districts or communities: 1

Executive Officers and Trustees serve four year terms. Trustee terms of office are staggered.

== Meetings ==
Quorum number: Executive Committee: 4 Executive members. General Council meetings must have fifty percent of qualified voters. General Council meetings are the first Saturday of February, May, August, and November of each year. Executive committee holds meetings at least once a month established by the President.

== Education and media ==
The local newspaper is the Moody County Enterprise, based in Flandreau, South Dakota.

== Leaders: past and present ==
- Chief Little Crow spent much of his life in Minnesota, where he was the head of a Santee band. Little Crow, established himself as a spokesman for his people. After becoming chief around 1834, he sought justice for his people, but also tried to maintain relations with whites. In 1862, he led the fight now known as the Minnesota Santee Conflict. In fact, this war was launched only in the face of starvation and only after the federal government didn’t present land payments as promised. Little Crow was killed the following year. He is buried near Flandreau.

== Notable Flandreau people ==
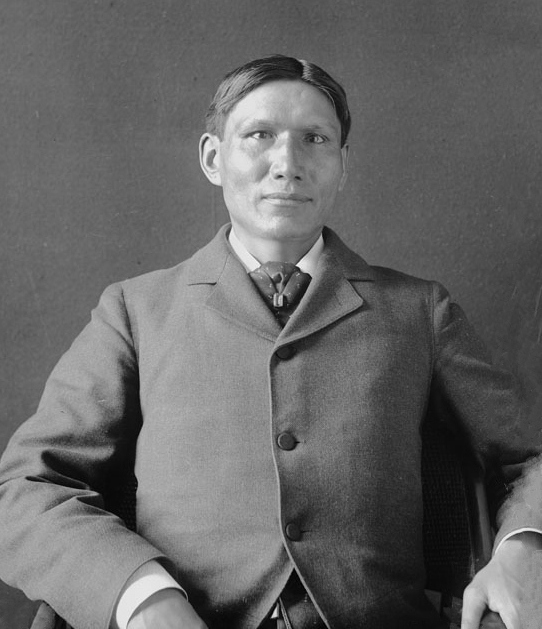
Dr. Charles Eastman, Ohiyesa, member of the Flandreau Santa Sioux Tribe

- Dr. Charles Alexander Eastman (Ohiyesa), physician, author, and member of the Flandreau Santee Sioux (base enrollee).
- Almeda Jones St. Clair, lived and worked at Flandreau in 1930s

== Legalization of cannabis ==
In mid-2015, the Tribe stated their intent to begin growing cannabis on one authorized site on their reservation, and commenced selling the product on 1 January 2016, following a vote of tribal authorities which decided 5–1 to legalize cannabis.
