= First Scandinavian Baptist Church =

Historic church in South Dakota, United States

- U.S. National Register of Historic Places
- Location within South Dakota Location within the United States
- Location: 2.5 miles (4.0 km) south of Trent, South Dakota
- Coordinates: 43°52′15″N 96°38′41″W
- Area: 1 acre (0.40 ha)
- Built: 1888
- Architectural style: Country church, Other
- NRHP reference No.: 00000999
- Added to NRHP: August 16, 2000

First Scandinavian Baptist Church is a historic church near Trent, South Dakota. It was built in 1888 and was added to the National Register in 2000.

It is about 100 yards (91 m) from the Big Sioux River, about 2.5 miles (4.0 km) south of Trent.

It was deemed notable as it "typifies the 'first generation' of church construction in eastern South Dakota."
