= St. Vincent's Hotel =

- U.S. National Register of Historic Places
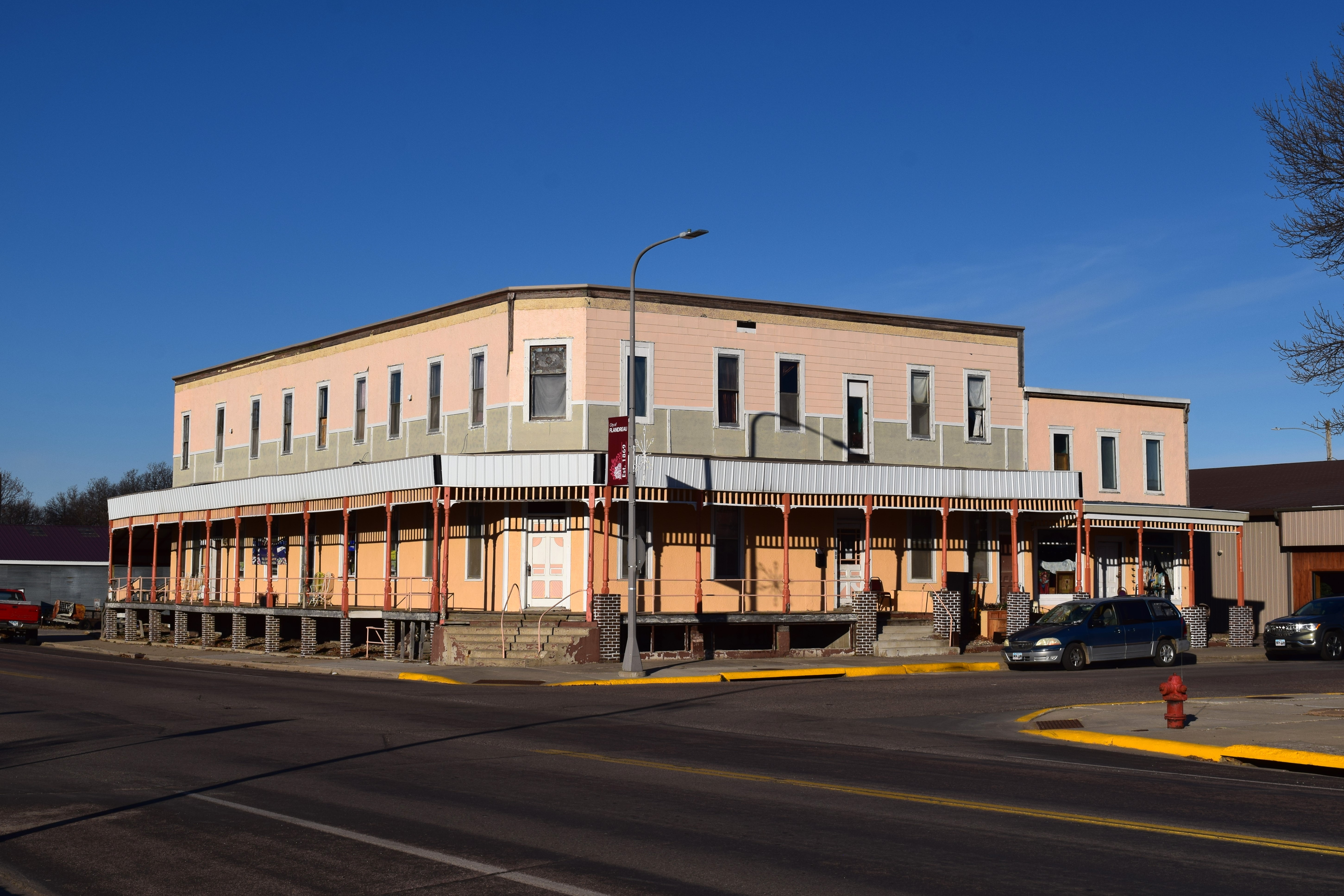

- Location within South Dakota Location within the United States
- Location: 100 North Wind, Flandreau, South Dakota
- Coordinates: 44°2′55″N 96°35′44″W
- Area: 1 acre (0.40 ha)
- Built: 1897
- NRHP reference No.: 83003018
- Added to NRHP: January 27, 1983

The St. Vincent's Hotel, at 100 North Wind in Flandreau, South Dakota, was built in 1897. It was listed on the National Register of Historic Places in 1983.

It is a two-story U-shaped frame building on a cut stone foundation.

It was deemed notable as "an unusual, surviving example of a 19th century frame hotel."
