= Pettigrew Barns =

- U.S. National Register of Historic Places
- Location within South Dakota Location within the United States
- Location: 309 East Broad, Flandreau, South Dakota
- Coordinates: 44.04272°N 96.59066°W
- Area: 1 acre (0.40 ha)
- Built: 1901
- Architectural style: Polygonal Barn
- MPS: South Dakota's Round and Polygonal Barns and Pavilions MPS
- NRHP reference No.: 04000473
- Added to NRHP: May 19, 2004

The Pettigrew Barns, also known as Severtson Barns, near Flandreau, South Dakota, are barns which were built in about 1901. They were listed on the National Register of Historic Places in 2004. As of 2004 the barns were owned by Craig Severtson.

== Architecture ==
The property comprises a two-story, wooden Wisconsin dairy barn with and gambrel roof, plus an octagonal barn with a gable roof. Both barns have concrete foundations and asphalt shingled roofs. The barns represent distinct architectural styles, but are connected together and the connection is covered with a gabled roof. Doorways provide access on the west and south elevations of the larger barn and on the west side of the smaller barn. The interior barn includes an auction area and exhibition area.

== History ==
The barns were built around 1901 by Giles Elon Pettigrew, to house newly introduced Herefords (beef cattle). The larger barn was the cattle barn; the smaller being a sales barn. In 1912 the Polled Herefords brand was introduced. In 1914 J.M. Pettigrew, built a champion herd, pairing up with Ron and Gloria Severtson in the 1950s to further develop the herd. Between the 1920's and 1980's, the polygonal barn saw weekly sales of cattle, sheep and pigs. The Severtsons became owners of the herd in the 1960's, selling nationally and internationally.Stock sales were held weekly in the polygonal barn through the 1980s. Both barns are still in use, however now used as a calving pair protection area.

== See also ==
- Architectural History in South Dakota. South Dakota State Historic Preservation Office, 2000.
- Homesteading and Agricultural Development Context. South Dakota State Historic Preservation Office, 1994.
- South Dakota's Round and Polygonal Bams and Pavilion, MPL 1995
- Ahrendt, Steph J., “South Dakota’s Round and Polygonal Barns and Pavilions,” Butte County, South Dakota. National Register of Historic Places Multiple Property *Documentation Form, 1995. National Park Service, U.S. Department of the Interior, Washington, D.C.
- https://listen.sdpb.org/news/2012-10-31/haunted-south-dakota
- https://gone2pieces.com/pettigrew-collection/
