= George Few House =

Historic house in South Dakota, United States

- U.S. National Register of Historic Places
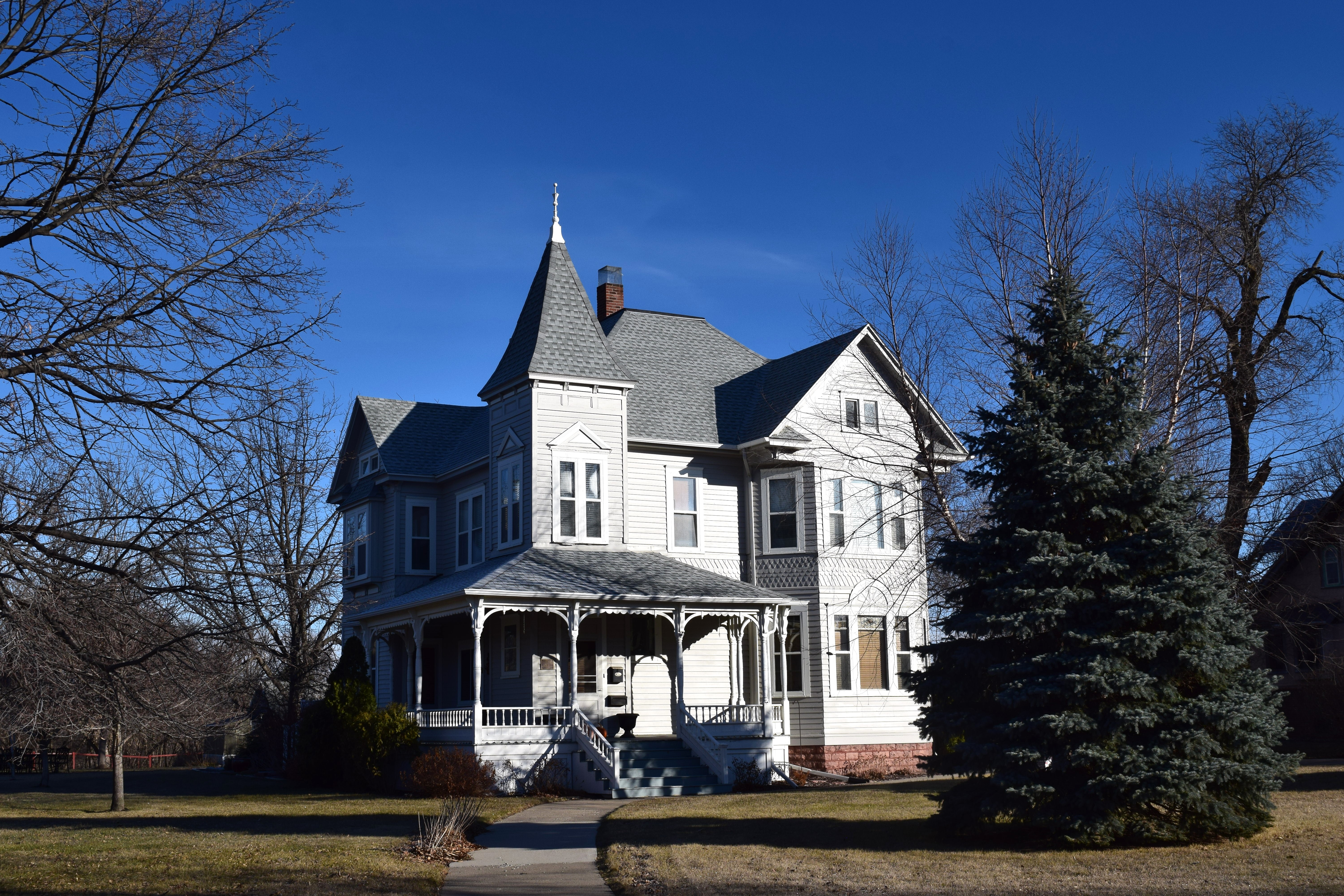

- Location within South Dakota Location within the United States
- Location: 208 1st Ave. E., Flandreau, South Dakota
- Coordinates: 44°03′03″N 96°35′32″W
- Area: 1 acre (0.40 ha)
- Built: 1899
- Architectural style: Stick/eastlake
- NRHP reference No.: 83003017
- Added to NRHP: August 18, 1983

The George Few House, located at 208 1st Ave. E. in Flandreau, South Dakota, was built in 1899. It was listed on the National Register of Historic Places in 1983.

The house cost $6,000 to build. It was deemed "significant as the home of an early businessman and politician and is a fine example of Eastern Stick style architecture."
