= St. Mary's Episcopal Church (Flandreau, South Dakota) =

Historic church in South Dakota, United States

- U.S. National Register of Historic Places
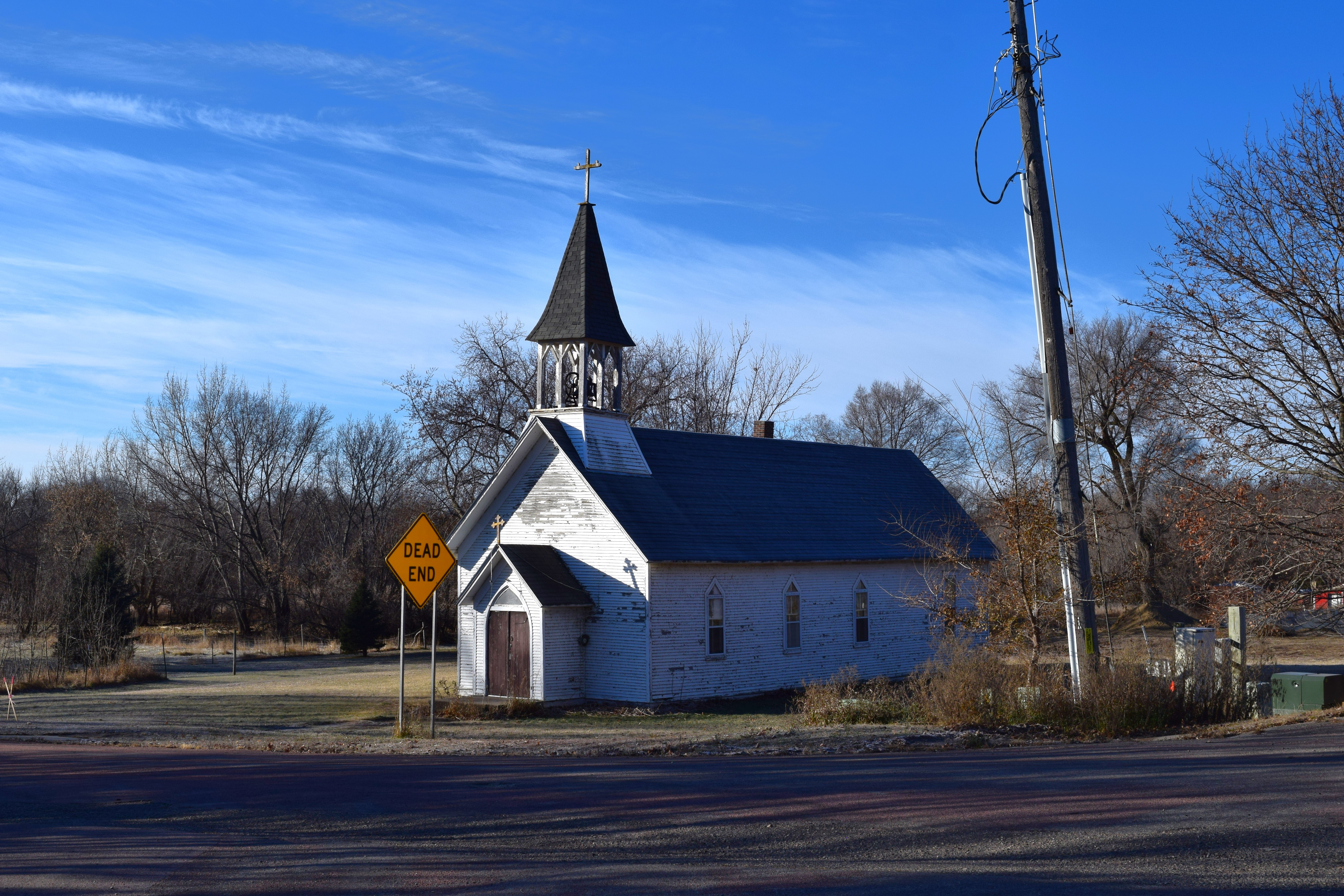

- Location within South Dakota Location within the United States
- Location: North Crescent St., Flandreau, South Dakota
- Coordinates: 44°3′29″N 96°35′38″W
- Area: less than one acre
- Built: 1879
- Architectural style: Gothic Revival
- NRHP reference No.: 01000998

St. Mary's Episcopal Church, also known as the Flandreau Indian School Chapel, is a historic church on North Crescent Street in Flandreau, South Dakota.

It was built in 1879 and was determined eligible for listing in the National Register in 2001. It was not listed due to the owner objecting.

It is one of numerous historic sites in Flandreau, one of South Dakota's oldest cities.
