= Flandreau Masonic Temple =

- U.S. National Register of Historic Places
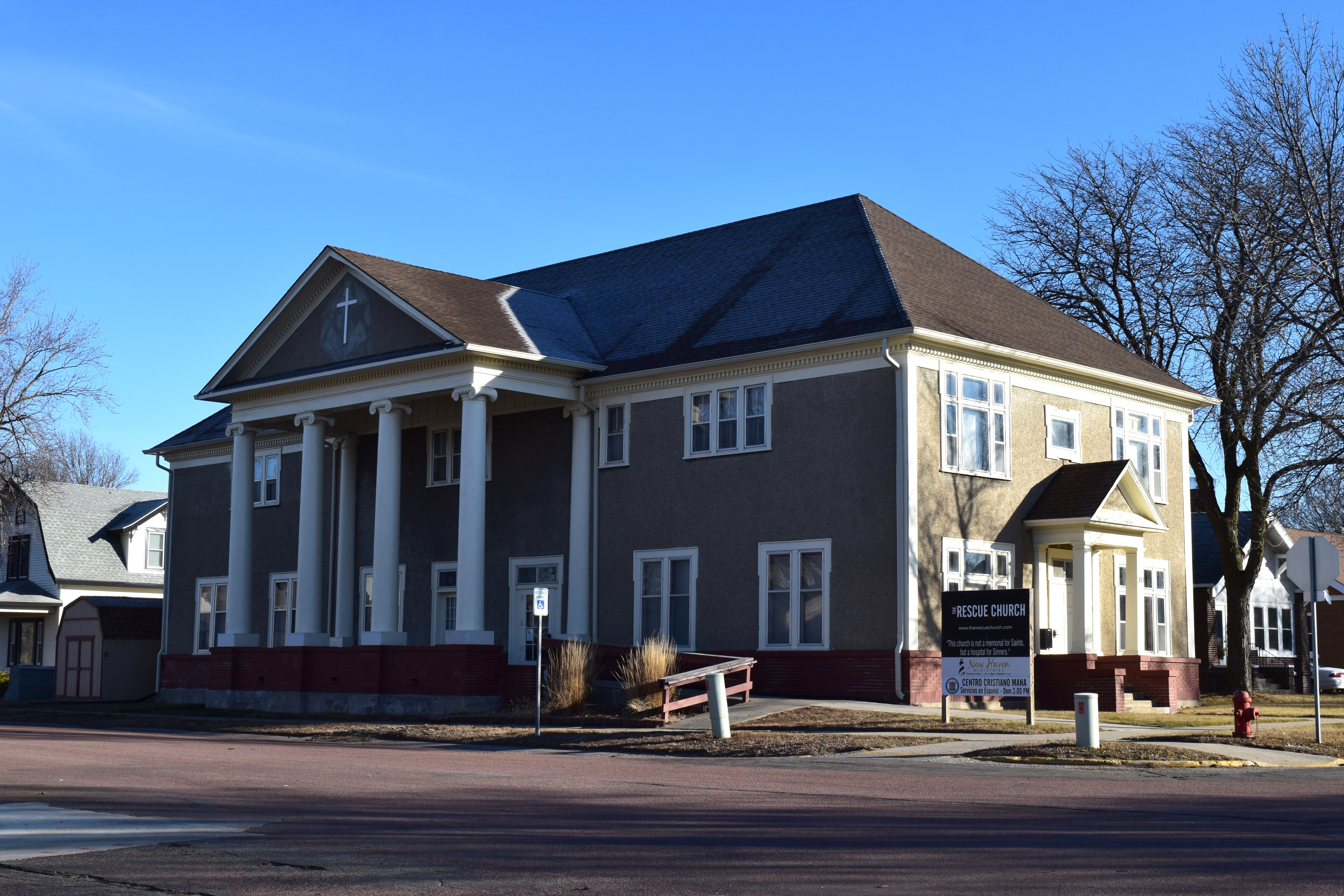

- Location within South Dakota Location within the United States
- Location: 300 E. Second Ave., Flandreau, South Dakota
- Coordinates: 44°02′59″N 96°35′28.8″W
- Area: less than one acre
- Built: 1882 (original); 1916 (major renovation)
- Architect: Simpson, M.B.
- Architectural style: Colonial Revival
- NRHP reference No.: 89001725
- Added to NRHP: October 19, 1989

The Flandreau Masonic Temple in Flandreau, South Dakota is a building dating mostly from 1916. It was listed on the National Register of Historic Places in 1989. It has also been known as the Old Moody County Courthouse.

It is "a massive two-story rectangular Colonial Revival building. Rising from a poured concrete foundation, the wood frame walls are covered with stucco and encircled by a three foot high brick watertable. The temple is capped by a hipped roof covered with wood shingles. A tall brick chimney rises from the northwest (front) corner. Projecting from the center of the west (front) facade is a huge pediment supported by four Ionic columns."

It was originally built in 1882 to serve as the county courthouse, with late-Victorian vernacular style. It then had "a gable roof with a large gabled dormer projecting from the center of each axial facade", with gables decorated by bargeboards. It was bought by the Masonic lodge in 1916 and was damaged by fire in 1919. Major remodeling was required, and added the Colonial Revival treatments.
