= Almeda Sperry =

American anarchist activist and prostitute

- Born: Almeda Sode; July 13, 1879; Pennsylvania, U.S.
- Died: September 10, 1957 (aged 78); Pittsburgh, Pennsylvania, U.S.
- Occupation: Political activist
- Known for: Wrote passionate love letters to fellow anarchist Emma Goldman

Almeda Sperry (July 13, 1879 – September 10, 1957) was an American anarchist, political activist, and former prostitute. She is known for the passionate love letters she wrote to fellow anarchist Emma Goldman. The letters allude to past sexual encounters between the two women, although the extent to which Goldman may have reciprocated the romantic feelings expressed by Sperry is unknown.

== Personal life ==
Sperry was born Almeda Sode (or Sodi) in Pennsylvania to Alsatian parents Christian Sode (or Sodi) and Barbara Treitz and married on November 26, 1902 to an Ohio machinist Fred Sperry. Together, the couple lived for most of the duration of their marriage in Pittsburgh.

Her love letters to Emma Goldman dating from 1912 reveal much about her personal life: her sexuality, contempt for men, occupation as a prostitute, and financial standing. On her sexuality, she says "I fear I never will love any man. I've seen too much and I am no fool." By the same token, she was emotionally devoted to her husband Fred. In the same letter, she spoke about her prostitution: "I have absolutely no reciprocation as far as passion is concerned for a man who pays me for sex." In her letters, however, she expressed respect for a man - one Alexander Berkman, who was also Goldman's close friend.

Scholars debate whether Sperry and Goldman had a romantic relationship since the latter did not acknowledge it in her autobiography. Sperry's letters, however, showed her romantic and sexual feelings toward Goldman.

Sperry died September 10, 1957, in Pittsburgh, Pennsylvania.

== Activism ==
Sperry first became an activist after hearing anarchist Emma Goldman give a speech on white slavery, at least by the year 1912. She became active in union organizing and advocated to bring sex education to students in her school district. She also wrote for several radical newspapers. Her written works showed insights on her position on the oppression of women, her lesbian longings, and her inclination to follow her passions.
