= Crystal Theatre (Elko, Nevada) =

Historic theater in Nevada, US

Coordinates: 40.83298°N 115.7601°W

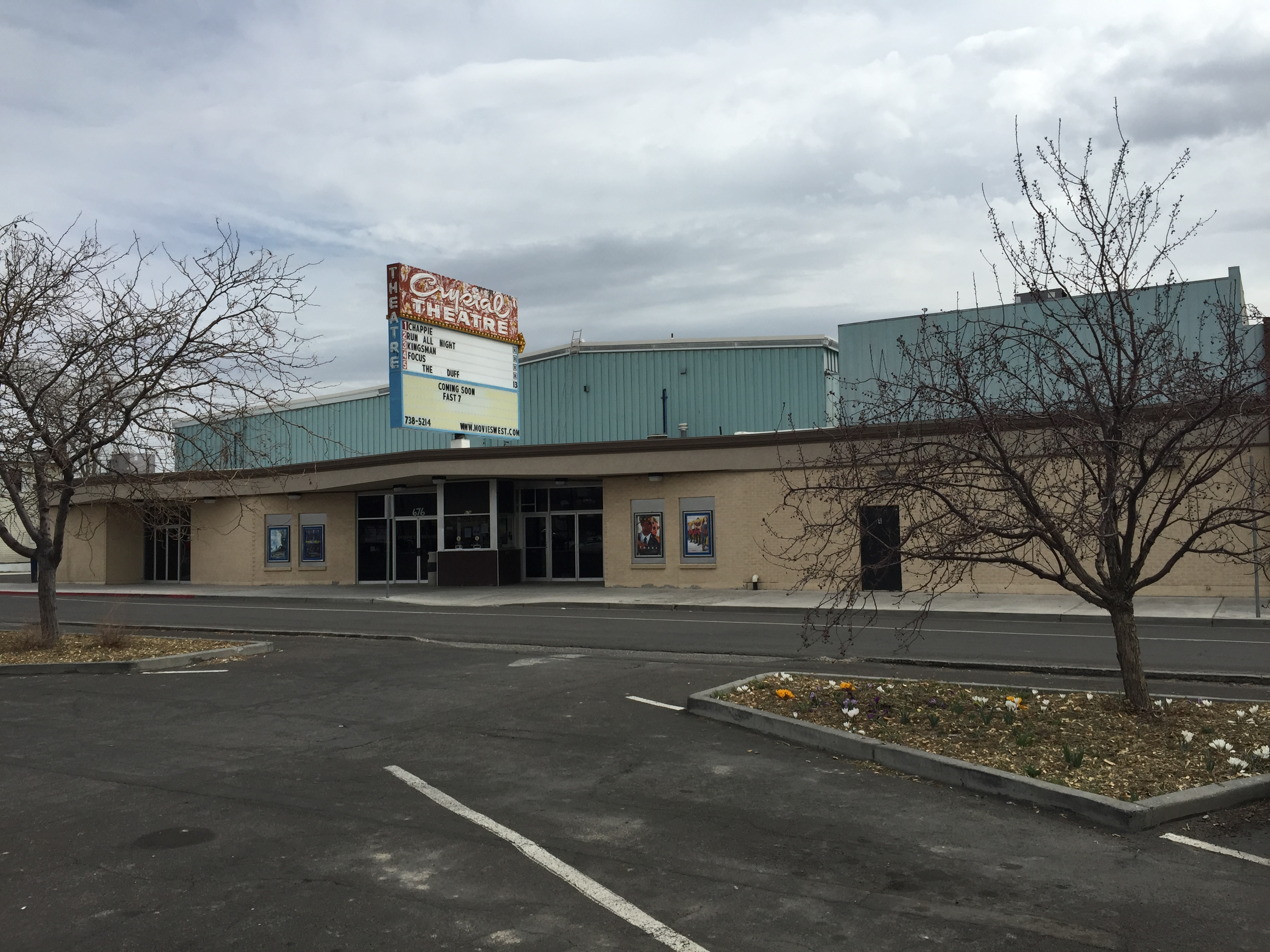

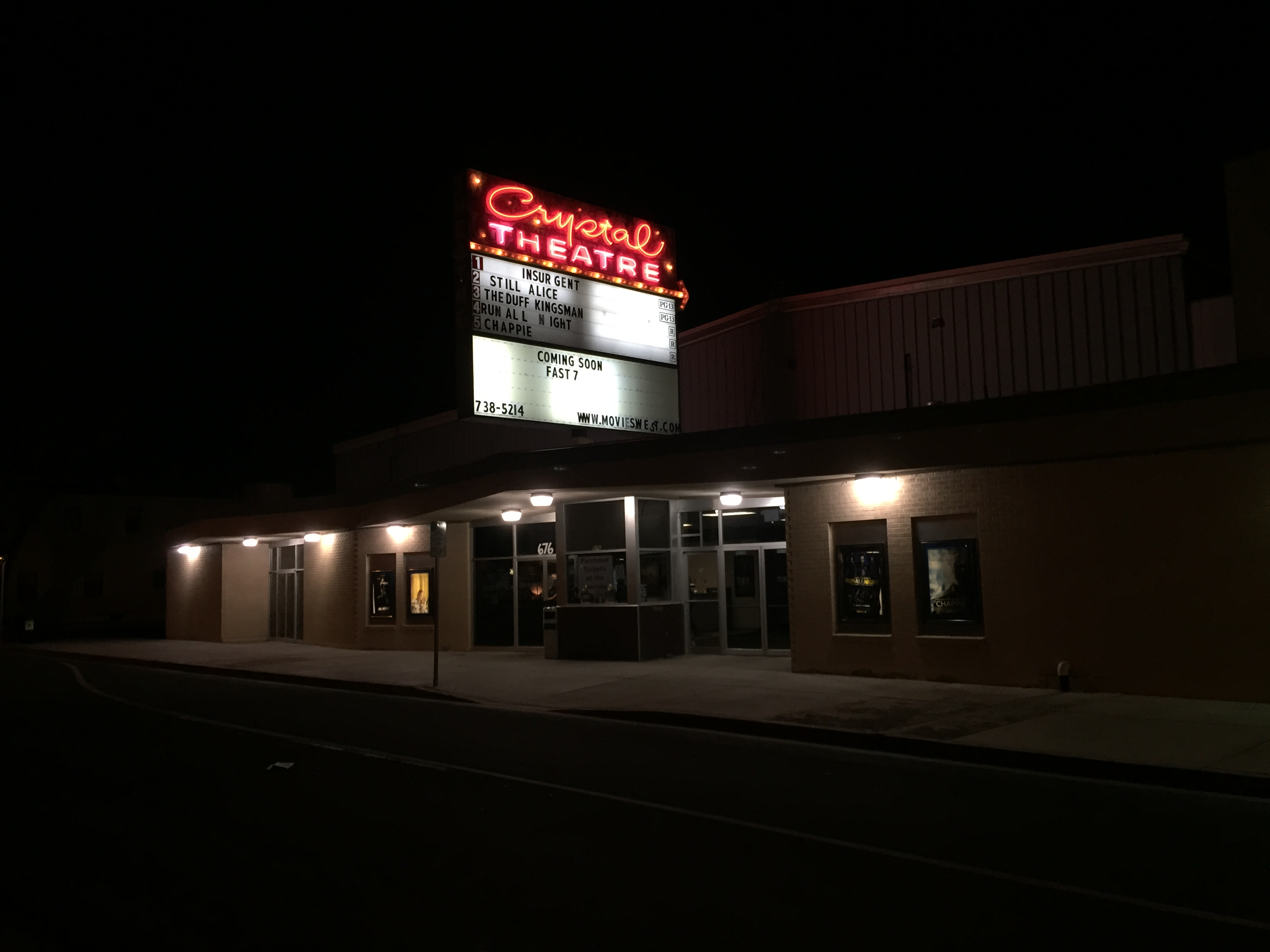

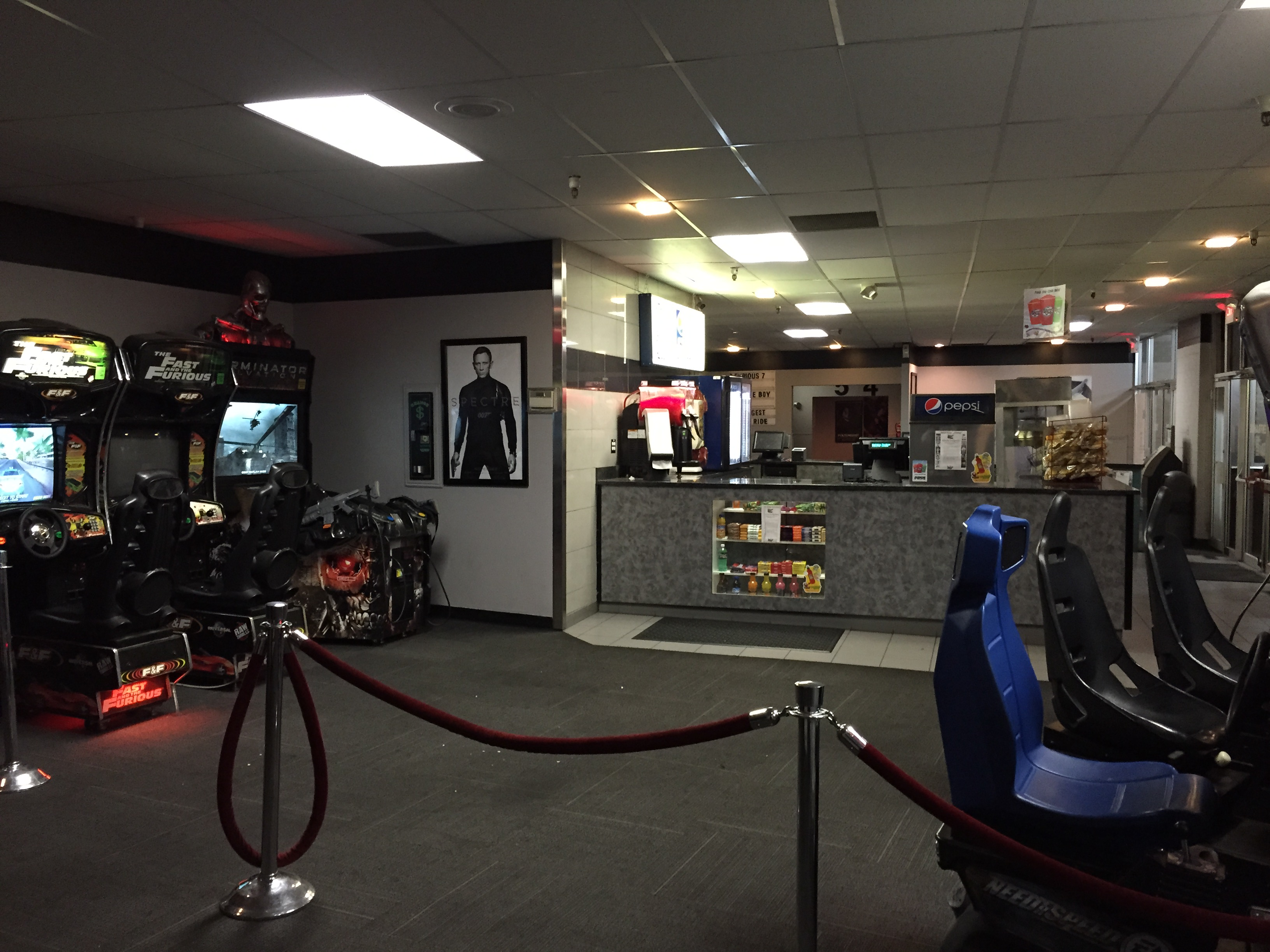

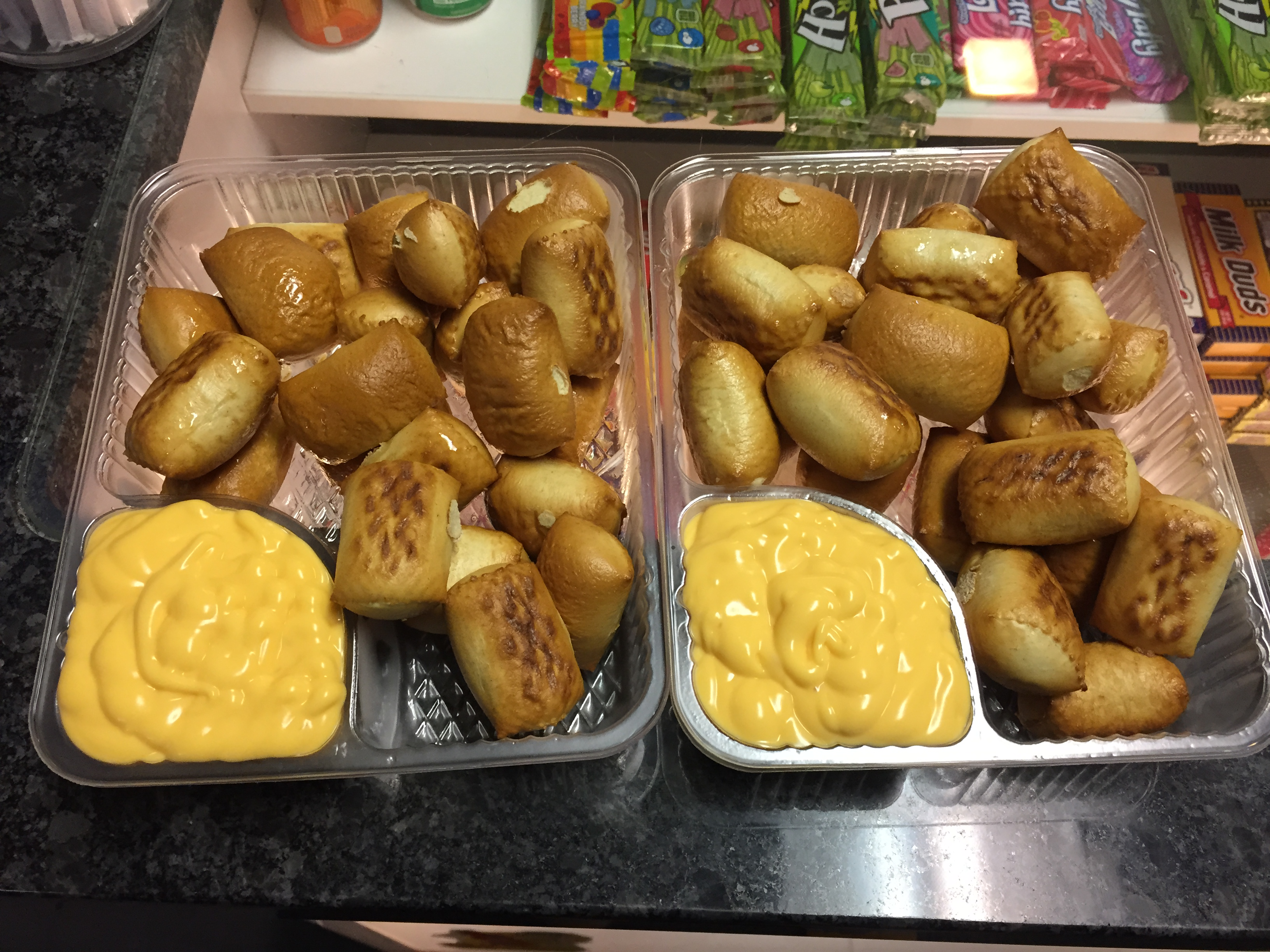

Crystal Theatre is a historic theater in Elko, Nevada. It is located at 676 Commercial Street. It is now known as the Crystal 5 and is part of UEC Theatres. The theater was part of a Nevada Supreme Court case in the 1970s.
