= Almeda, Cornellà de Llobregat =

District in the metropolitan area of Barcelona

Coordinates: 41°21′09″N 2°05′01″E

Almeda is an area of Cornellà de Llobregat in Catalonia, Spain, within the metropolitan area of Barcelona. It was constructed in front of Parc de Can Mercader. The neighbourhood originated during the Industrial Revolution and grew substantially with the settlement of migrant workers from other areas of the country during the 1950s. Some of Cornellà's most important companies are located there. Its main business estates are Fira de Cornellà, WTC Almeda Park and the local branch of El Corte Inglés. Almeda has had a railway station since 1912; the current one was built in 1985 and is integrated into the Barcelona Metro network as part of line L8.

== See also ==
- Mercader Palace Museum
