= Crystal Theatre (Gonzales, Texas) =

Coordinates: 29.502236°N 97.451223°W

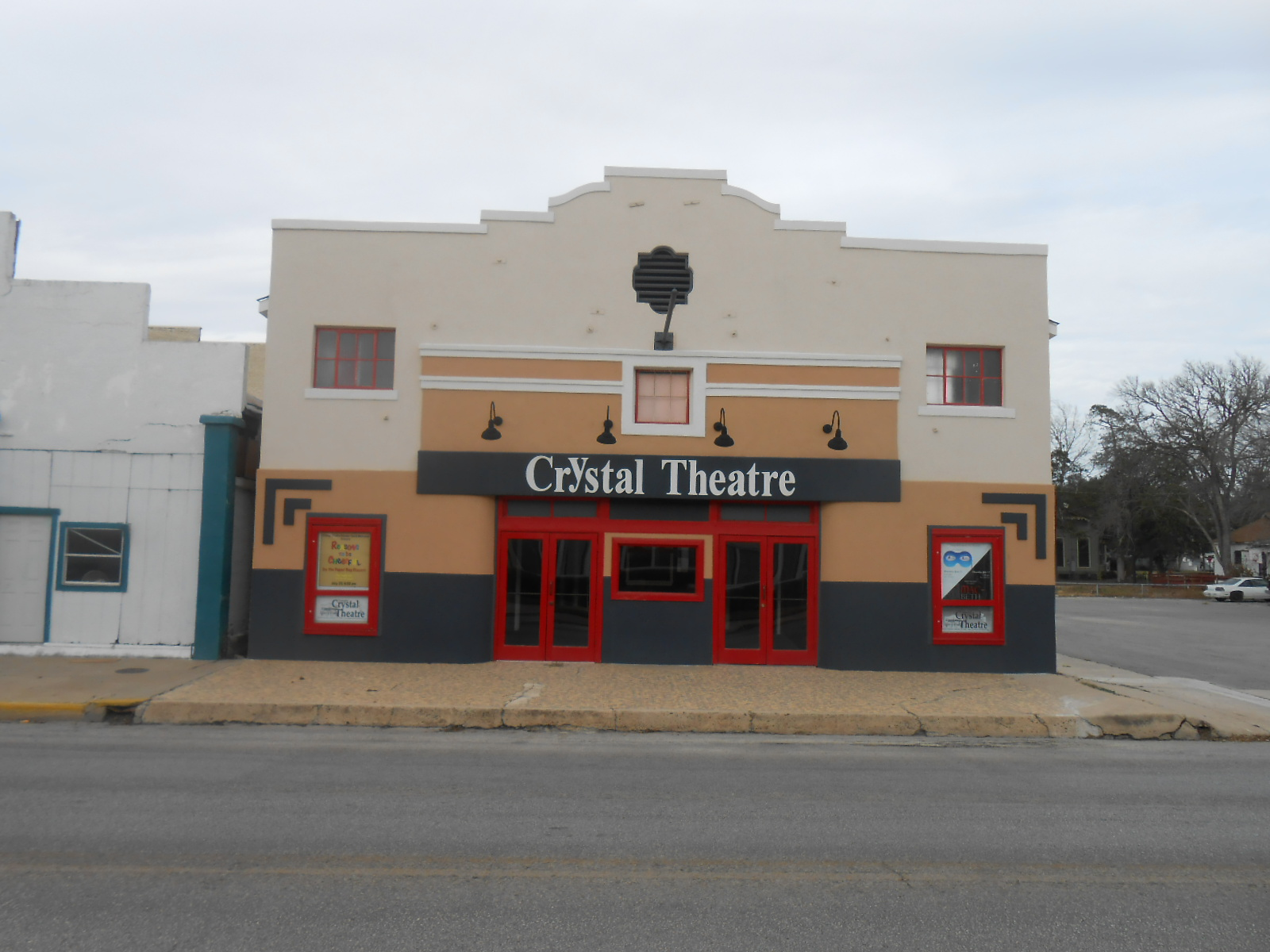

Crystal Theatre is a historic theater in Gonzales, Texas. It has hosted vaudeville performances, silent movies, and talkies, and later became a coffee house and dinner theater venue. It was reopened in 2009 with a focus on youth programs.

== History ==
The theater opened in 1913 or 1917. With 586 seats, it was used for vaudeville, also under the name New Playhouse, and as a movie theater, then for dinner theater. It was restored in 1982 by Crystal Theatre, Inc. but was used only occasionally for a number of years before reopening in 2009 with a reduced seating capacity of 125 and a focus on youth programs. An acting program for high school students has taken place since the early 1990s and now includes "Shakespeare ninjas". Barbara Crozier is the theatre's president.
