= William H. Loucks =

American politician

William Henry Loucks (April 27, 1844 – May 7, 1918) was an American politician was a member of the South Dakota House of Representatives.

== Biography ==
Loucks was born on April 27, 1844, in Kenosha County, Wisconsin. He was raised in Fond du Lac, Wisconsin. During the American Civil War, Loucks served with the 32nd Wisconsin Volunteer Infantry Regiment of the Union Army. Engagements in which he was a participant include the Battle of Parker's Cross Roads, the Battle of Collierville, the Battle of Paducah, the Battle of Jonesborough and Sherman's March to the Sea. He was also present for the surrender of the Army of Tennessee by Joseph E. Johnston at Bennett Place.

Loucks died on May 7, 1918, in Trent, South Dakota.

== Political career ==
Loucks, a Republican, was a member of the House of Representatives for two terms: from 1889 to 1890 and from 1901 to 1904. He was Postmaster of Trent, then called Brookfield.
