= Crystal Theatre (Okemah, Oklahoma) =

Entertainment venue in the United States

Coordinates: 35.43127°N 96.30493°W

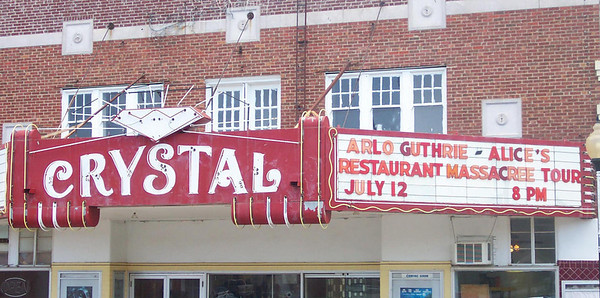
Crystal Theater marquee

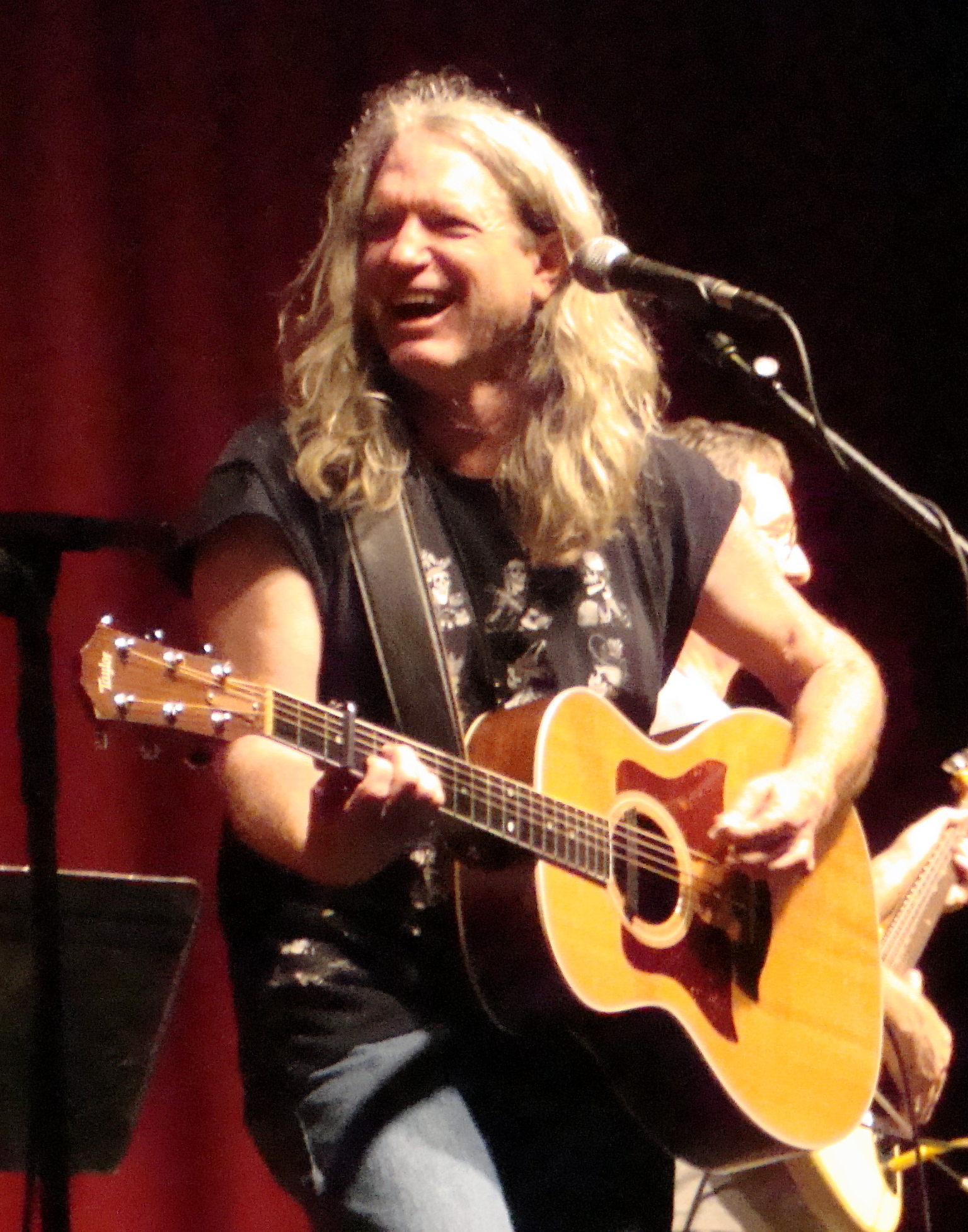
Sam Baker playing at the Crystal Theater during Woody (Guthrie) Fest in 2009

Crystal Theater is a historic theater in Okemah, Oklahoma. It was built in 1921 and has hosted the Woody Guthrie Folk Festival.
