= Ward, South Dakota =

- Town
- Location in Moody County and the state of South Dakota
- Coordinates: 44°09′17″N 96°27′45″W
- Country: United States
- State: South Dakota
- County: Moody

Area
  - Total: 0.29 sq mi (0.75 km^{2})
  - Land: 0.29 sq mi (0.75 km^{2})
  - Water: 0 sq mi (0.00 km^{2})
- Elevation: 1,755 ft (535 m)

Population (2020)
  - Total: 34
  - Density: 117.0/sq mi (45.17/km^{2})
- Time zone: UTC-6 (Central (CST))
  - Summer (DST): UTC-5 (CDT)
- Area code: 605
- FIPS code: 46-68660
- GNIS feature ID: 1267624

Ward is a town in Moody County, South Dakota, United States. The population was 34 at the 2020 census.

== History ==
Ward was named after James A. Ward, a railroad promoter and auditor of Dakota Territory from 1887 to 1889.

== Geography ==
According to the United States Census Bureau, the town has a total area of 0.29 square miles (0.75 km^{2}), all land.

== Demographics ==
Historical population
Census	Pop.	Note	%±
1910	72		—
1920	118		63.9%
1930	90		−23.7%
1940	84		−6.7%
1950	96		14.3%
1960	74		−22.9%
1970	57		−23.0%
1980	43		−24.6%
1990	35		−18.6%
2000	41		17.1%
2010	48		17.1%
2020	34		−29.2%
U.S. Decennial Census

=== 2010 census ===
As of the census of 2010, there were 48 people, 17 households, and 12 families residing in the town. The population density was 165.5 inhabitants per square mile (63.9/km^{2}). There were 21 housing units at an average density of 72.4 per square mile (28.0/km^{2}). The racial makeup of the town was 93.8% White, 2.1% Native American, and 4.2% from two or more races.

There were 17 households, of which 41.2% had children under the age of 18 living with them, 58.8% were married couples living together, 11.8% had a male householder with no wife present, and 29.4% were non-families. 29.4% of all households were made up of individuals, and 5.9% had someone living alone who was 65 years of age or older. The average household size was 2.82 and the average family size was 3.42.

The median age in the town was 40 years. 27.1% of residents were under the age of 18; 8.4% were between the ages of 18 and 24; 29.2% were from 25 to 44; 22.9% were from 45 to 64; and 12.5% were 65 years of age or older. The gender makeup of the town was 52.1% male and 47.9% female.

=== 2000 census ===
As of the census of 2000, there were 41 people, 18 households, and 9 families residing in the town. The population density was 144.0 inhabitants per square mile (55.6/km^{2}). There were 22 housing units at an average density of 77.3 per square mile (29.8/km^{2}). The racial makeup of the town was 87.80% White, 7.32% Native American, and 4.88% from two or more races.

There were 18 households, out of which 33.3% had children under the age of 18 living with them, 38.9% were married couples living together, and 50.0% were non-families. 38.9% of all households were made up of individuals, and 11.1% had someone living alone who was 65 years of age or older. The average household size was 2.28 and the average family size was 3.22.

In the town, the population was spread out, with 31.7% under the age of 18, 2.4% from 18 to 24, 36.6% from 25 to 44, 14.6% from 45 to 64, and 14.6% who were 65 years of age or older. The median age was 34 years. For every 100 females, there were 105.0 males. For every 100 females age 18 and over, there were 100.0 males.

The median income for a household in the town was $18,750, and the median income for a family was $31,250. Males had a median income of $26,250 versus $22,083 for females. The per capita income for the town was $12,367. There were 33.3% of families and 30.0% of the population living below the poverty line, including no under eighteens and 100.0% of those over 64.

== Education ==
It is in the Flandreau School District.
