= Crystal Theater (Dublin, Georgia) =

Defunct silent-movie theater

Coordinates: 32.5396°N 82.9049°W

Crystal Theater in Dublin, Georgia was a historic theater that showed silent movies. It was the main theatre in Dublin in the beginning of the 1900s. As of 2018, it is home to Deano's Restaurant.

In 1920, the theater's manager was arrested and fined $25.00 by Dublin police for advertising the 1919 film, Back to God's Country, by painting bear tracks leading to The Crystal on sidewalks.

In 1922, boxing matches were held at the theater between Bill McGowan of Dublin, who later became a stuntman in Hollywood, against a boxer from Chicago as well as a fight that included "Baby" Stribling, younger brother of Young Stribling of Macon, Georgia.
