= Almeda Jones St. Clair =

American missionary teacher

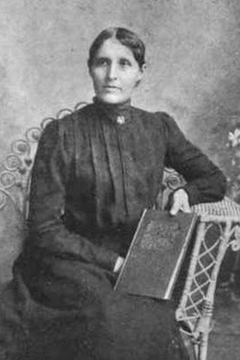
- Almeda Jones St. Clair, from a 1909 publication
- Born: February 28, 1868; Dakota Territory
- Died: December 8, 1952 (aged 84); Redwood County, Minnesota
- Other name: Amelia St. Clair
- Occupations: Educator, missionary, lacemaker

Almeda Jones St. Clair (February 28, 1868 – December 8, 1952), also known as Amelia St. Clair, was an American Indigenous Christian missionary, teacher, translator, and expert lacemaker, whose lace work was shown at the 1900 Paris Exposition, and presented to Queen Alexandra.

== Biography ==
Almeda Jones was born in Dakota Territory, the daughter of Mary Jones. She married Henry Benjamin Whipple St. Clair, a Sioux Protestant Episcopal clergyman, in 1889. They had thirteen children together, and celebrated fifty years of marriage together in 1939, at a community event at the Birch Coulee Indian Mission in Minnesota.

As a minister's wife, St. Clair taught and worked in various indigenous communities in the Upper Midwest. She taught lacemaking at Bishop Whipple Mission in Minnesota, initially as assistant and translator for missionary Susan Salisbury. Her lace designs included a pillow covering made for Queen Alexandra. She also sang hymns in "the Dakota language" for community groups. In the 1930s, she and her family lived at the Flandreau Sioux reservation, and she taught at the Flandreau Indian School there.

Her son Henry died in 1931. She died in 1952, aged 85 years, in Paxton Township, Redwood County, Minnesota. Her great-granddaughter, Iyekiyapiwiŋ Darlene St. Clair, is a professor at St. Cloud State University and director of the school's Multicultural Resource Center.
