= Crystal Theatre (Flandreau, South Dakota) =

- U.S. National Register of Historic Places
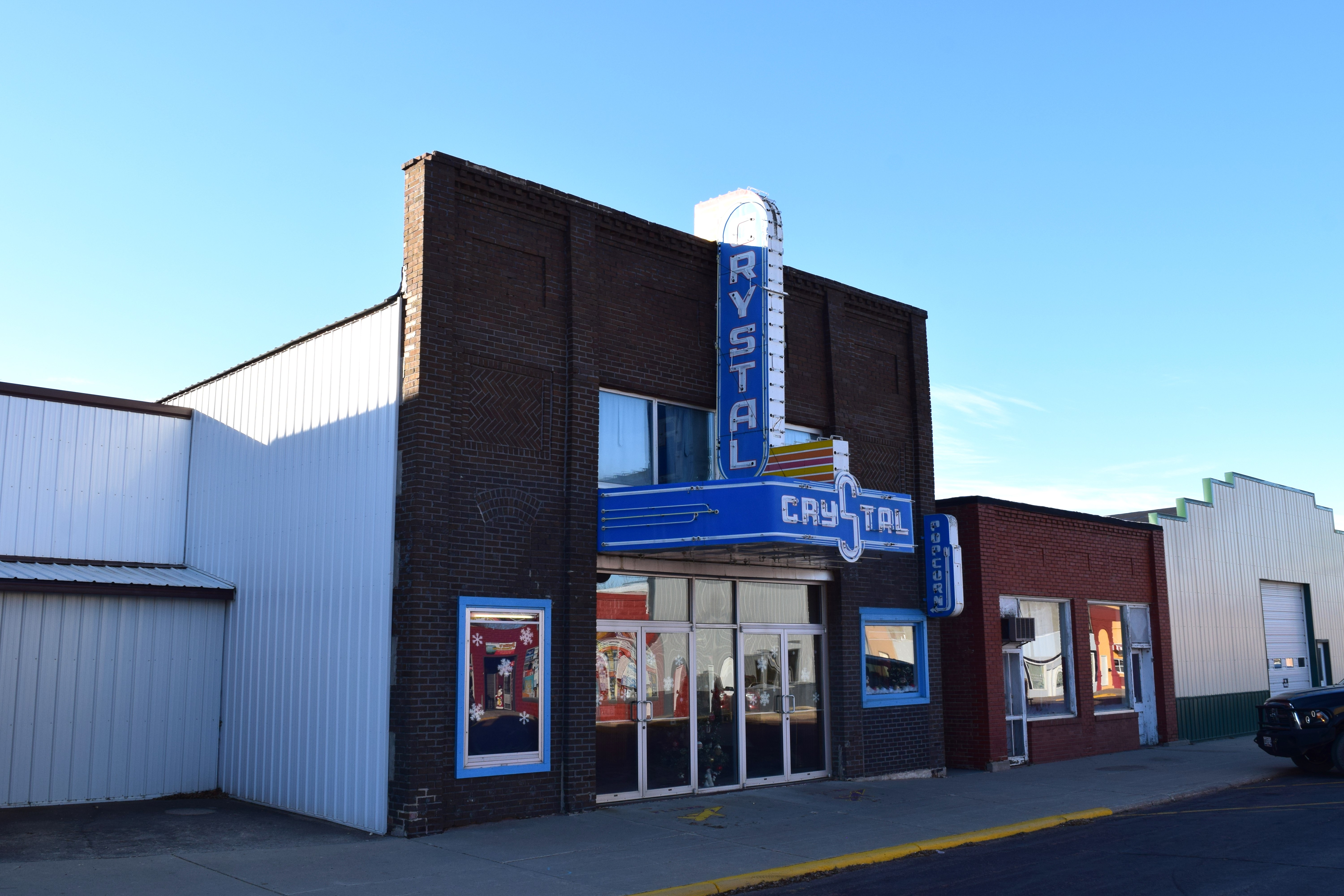

- Location within South Dakota Location within the United States
- Location: 215 E. Second Ave., Flandreau, South Dakota
- Coordinates: 44°2′57″N 96°35′32″W
- Area: less than one acre
- Built: 1913
- Architectural style: Early Commercial
- NRHP reference No.: 00001214
- Added to NRHP: October 12, 2000

The Crystal Theatre in Flandreau, South Dakota was built in 1913. It was listed on the National Register of Historic Places in 2000. It has hosted live vaudeville performances and film showings.

It is Early Commercial in style. It is a two-story brick structure with a parapet hiding its flat roof. It is 32 by 100 feet (9.8 m × 30.5 m) in plan.

It was opened in January 1914. It received Technicolor installation in 1932. It was closed in 1969, reopened in 1971 and showed movies into the mid-1980s. It was purchased by a local theatre group in the late 1980s.

It was deemed notable "for its association with recreation and entertainment in Flandreau, South Dakota" and "for its Commercial Style of architecture."
