= Crystal Theatre (Los Angeles, California) =

Coordinates: 34.05023°N 118.24547°W

Crystal Theatre is a historic theater in downtown Los Angeles, California that has been remodeled into a bar and club. Located north of the Downtown Independent, the theater is now the club "The Smell", and the New Jalisco Bar at 245 and 247 South Main Street. The theater dates to at least 1910. It has been threatened with demolition.
