= Trent, South Dakota =

- Town
- Location in Moody County and the state of South Dakota
- Coordinates: 43°54′23″N 96°39′28″W
- Country: United States
- State: South Dakota
- County: Moody
- Incorporated: 1884

Area
  - Total: 1.04 sq mi (2.70 km^{2})
  - Land: 1.04 sq mi (2.70 km^{2})
  - Water: 0 sq mi (0.00 km^{2})
- Elevation: 1,499 ft (457 m)

Population (2020)
  - Total: 206
  - Density: 197.7/sq mi (76.34/km^{2})
- Time zone: UTC-6 (Central (CST))
  - Summer (DST): UTC-5 (CDT)
- ZIP code: 57065
- Area code: 605
- FIPS code: 46-63940
- GNIS feature ID: 1267603

Trent is a town in south central Moody County, South Dakota, United States. The population was 206 at the 2020 census.

== History ==
Trent was laid out in 1874. It is located along the historic Milwaukee Railroad line. Trent was formerly called Brookfield, but it was renamed in 1886 to avoid confusion with another town on the same railroad route.

In 1903, Trent relocated east of the railroad due to flooding.

== Geography ==
According to the United States Census Bureau, the town has a total area of 1.04 square miles (2.69 km^{2}), all land.

The Big Sioux River runs through Trent. Brookfield Creek, a tributary of the Big Sioux River, takes its name from Trent's former location.

== Demographics ==
Historical population
Census	Pop.	Note	%±
1920	295		—
1930	256		−13.2%
1940	240		−6.2%
1950	213		−11.2%
1960	232		8.9%
1970	177		−23.7%
1980	197		11.3%
1990	211		7.1%
2000	254		20.4%
2010	232		−8.7%
2020	206		−11.2%
U.S. Decennial Census

=== 2010 census ===
As of the census of 2010, there were 232 people, 102 households, and 61 families residing in the town. The population density was 223.1 inhabitants per square mile (86.1/km^{2}). There were 113 housing units at an average density of 108.7 per square mile (42.0/km^{2}). The racial makeup of the town was 91.4% White, 0.9% African American, 3.4% Native American, 0.9% Asian, and 3.4% from two or more races. Hispanic or Latino of any race were 0.4% of the population.

There were 102 households, of which 19.6% had children under the age of 18 living with them, 46.1% were married couples living together, 9.8% had a female householder with no husband present, 3.9% had a male householder with no wife present, and 40.2% were non-families. 31.4% of all households were made up of individuals, and 6.8% had someone living alone who was 65 years of age or older. The average household size was 2.13 and the average family size was 2.59.

The median age in the town was 48.3 years. 15.1% of residents were under the age of 18; 7.7% were between the ages of 18 and 24; 23.3% were from 25 to 44; 41% were from 45 to 64; and 12.9% were 65 years of age or older. The gender makeup of the town was 49.1% male and 50.9% female.

=== 2000 census ===
As of the census of 2000, there were 254 people, 106 households, and 64 families residing in the town. The population density was 251.9 inhabitants per square mile (97.3/km^{2}). There were 111 housing units at an average density of 110.1 per square mile (42.5/km^{2}). The racial makeup of the town was 98.03% White, 0.75% African American, 0.39% Native American, and 1.57% from two or more races. Hispanic or Latino of any race were 0.39% of the population.

There were 106 households, out of which 27.4% had children under the age of 18 living with them, 50.9% were married couples living together, 5.7% had a female householder with no husband present, and 38.7% were non-families. 31.1% of all households were made up of individuals, and 11.3% had someone living alone who was 65 years of age or older. The average household size was 2.23 and the average family size was 2.83.

There was a wide distribution of ages, with 21.7% under the age of 18, 7.1% from 18 to 24, 30.7% from 25 to 44, 23.2% from 45 to 64, and 17.3% who were 65 years of age or older. The median age was 40 years. For every 100 females, there were 111.7 males. For every 100 females age 18 and over, there were 99.0 males.

The median income for a household in the town was $36,161, and the median income for a family was $39,318. Males had a median income of $27,222 versus $23,542 for females. The per capita income for the town was $16,855. About 6.1% of families and 17.0% of the population were below the poverty line, including 14.8% of those under the age of eighteen and 51.0% of those 65 or over.

== Education ==
It is in the Flandreau School District.

== Notable people ==
- Edith Green, Congresswoman representing Oregon's 3rd congressional district from 1955 to 1974.
- William H. Loucks, South Dakota State Representative from 1889 to 1890 and 1901 to 1904.
