= Egan, South Dakota =

- City
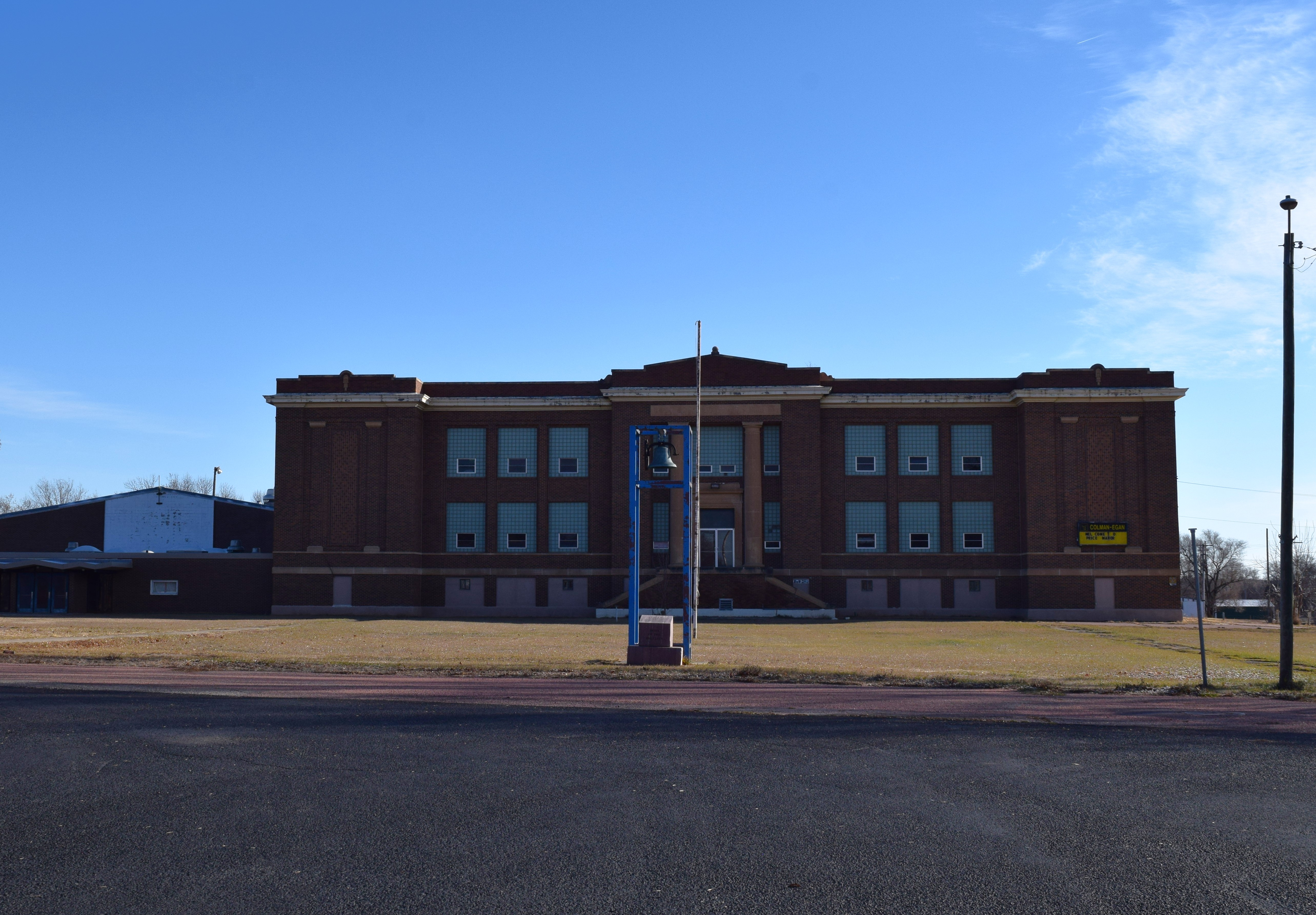
- Former Colman-Egan School building in Egan

- Location in Moody County and the state of South Dakota
- Coordinates: 43°59′54″N 96°38′55″W
- Country: United States
- State: South Dakota
- County: Moody
- Incorporated (city): 1881

Area
  - Total: 1.07 sq mi (2.76 km^{2})
  - Land: 1.07 sq mi (2.76 km^{2})
  - Water: 0 sq mi (0.00 km^{2})
- Elevation: 1,529 ft (466 m)

Population (2020)
  - Total: 241
  - Density: 225.8/sq mi (87.18/km^{2})
- Time zone: UTC-6 (Central (CST))
  - Summer (DST): UTC-5 (CDT)
- ZIP code: 57024
- Area code: 605
- FIPS code: 46-18460
- GNIS feature ID: 1267377
- Website: egansd.com

Egan is a city in Moody County, South Dakota, United States. The population was 241 at the 2020 census.

The city has the name of a railroad employee.

== Geography ==
According to the United States Census Bureau, the city has a total area of 1.07 square miles (2.77 km^{2}), all land.

== Demographics ==
Historical population
Census	Pop.	Note	%±
1880	23		—
1890	399		1,634.8%
1900	503		26.1%
1910	516		2.6%
1920	569		10.3%
1930	419		−26.4%
1940	418		−0.2%
1950	347		−17.0%
1960	310		−10.7%
1970	281		−9.4%
1980	248		−11.7%
1990	208		−16.1%
2000	265		27.4%
2010	278		4.9%
2020	241		−13.3%
U.S. Decennial Census

=== 2020 census ===
As of the 2020 census, Egan had a population of 241. The median age was 41.1 years. 27.4% of residents were under the age of 18 and 21.6% were 65 years of age or older. For every 100 females there were 102.5 males, and for every 100 females age 18 and over there were 94.4 males age 18 and over.

0.0% of residents lived in urban areas, while 100.0% lived in rural areas.

There were 90 households in Egan, of which 25.6% had children under the age of 18 living in them. Of all households, 42.2% were married-couple households, 25.6% were households with a male householder and no spouse or partner present, and 25.6% were households with a female householder and no spouse or partner present. About 31.1% of all households were made up of individuals and 18.9% had someone living alone who was 65 years of age or older.

There were 110 housing units, of which 18.2% were vacant. The homeowner vacancy rate was 3.7% and the rental vacancy rate was 11.1%.

Racial composition as of the 2020 census
Race	Number	Percent
White	208	86.3%
Black or African American	1	0.4%
American Indian and Alaska Native	15	6.2%
Asian	0	0.0%
Native Hawaiian and Other Pacific Islander	0	0.0%
Some other race	9	3.7%
Two or more races	8	3.3%
Hispanic or Latino (of any race)	12	5.0%

=== 2010 census ===
As of the census of 2010, there were 278 people, 117 households, and 76 families residing in the city. The population density was 259.8 inhabitants per square mile (100.3/km^{2}). There were 127 housing units at an average density of 118.7 per square mile (45.8/km^{2}). The racial makeup of the city was 86.3% White, 8.6% Native American, 0.7% Asian, 0.4% from other races, and 4.0% from two or more races. Hispanic or Latino of any race were 2.2% of the population.

There were 117 households, of which 25.6% had children under the age of 18 living with them, 51.3% were married couples living together, 7.7% had a female householder with no husband present, 6.0% had a male householder with no wife present, and 35.0% were non-families. 30.8% of all households were made up of individuals, and 10.3% had someone living alone who was 65 years of age or older. The average household size was 2.38 and the average family size was 2.92.

The median age in the city was 41.6 years. 23.7% of residents were under the age of 18; 5.9% were between the ages of 18 and 24; 24.5% were from 25 to 44; 31% were from 45 to 64; and 15.1% were 65 years of age or older. The gender makeup of the city was 51.8% male and 48.2% female.

=== 2000 census ===
As of the census of 2000, there were 265 people, 111 households, and 67 families residing in the city. The population density was 380.5 inhabitants per square mile (146.9/km^{2}). There were 119 housing units at an average density of 170.9 per square mile (66.0/km^{2}). The racial makeup of the city was 93.96% White, 4.91% Native American, and 1.13% from two or more races.

There were 111 households, out of which 34.2% had children under the age of 18 living with them, 47.7% were married couples living together, 7.2% had a female householder with no husband present, and 39.6% were non-families. 34.2% of all households were made up of individuals, and 13.5% had someone living alone who was 65 years of age or older. The average household size was 2.39 and the average family size was 3.15.

In the city, the population was spread out, with 26.8% under the age of 18, 7.2% from 18 to 24, 28.7% from 25 to 44, 24.9% from 45 to 64, and 12.5% who were 65 years of age or older. The median age was 36 years. For every 100 females, there were 115.4 males. For every 100 females age 18 and over, there were 110.9 males.

The median income for a household in the city was $26,979, and the median income for a family was $30,000. Males had a median income of $25,357 versus $17,188 for females. The per capita income for the city was $13,392. About 1.4% of families and 5.7% of the population were below the poverty line, including 2.2% of those under the age of eighteen and 20.0% of those 65 or over.

== Education ==
It is in the Colman-Egan School District 50-5.
