= Moody County, South Dakota =

County in South Dakota, United States

- County
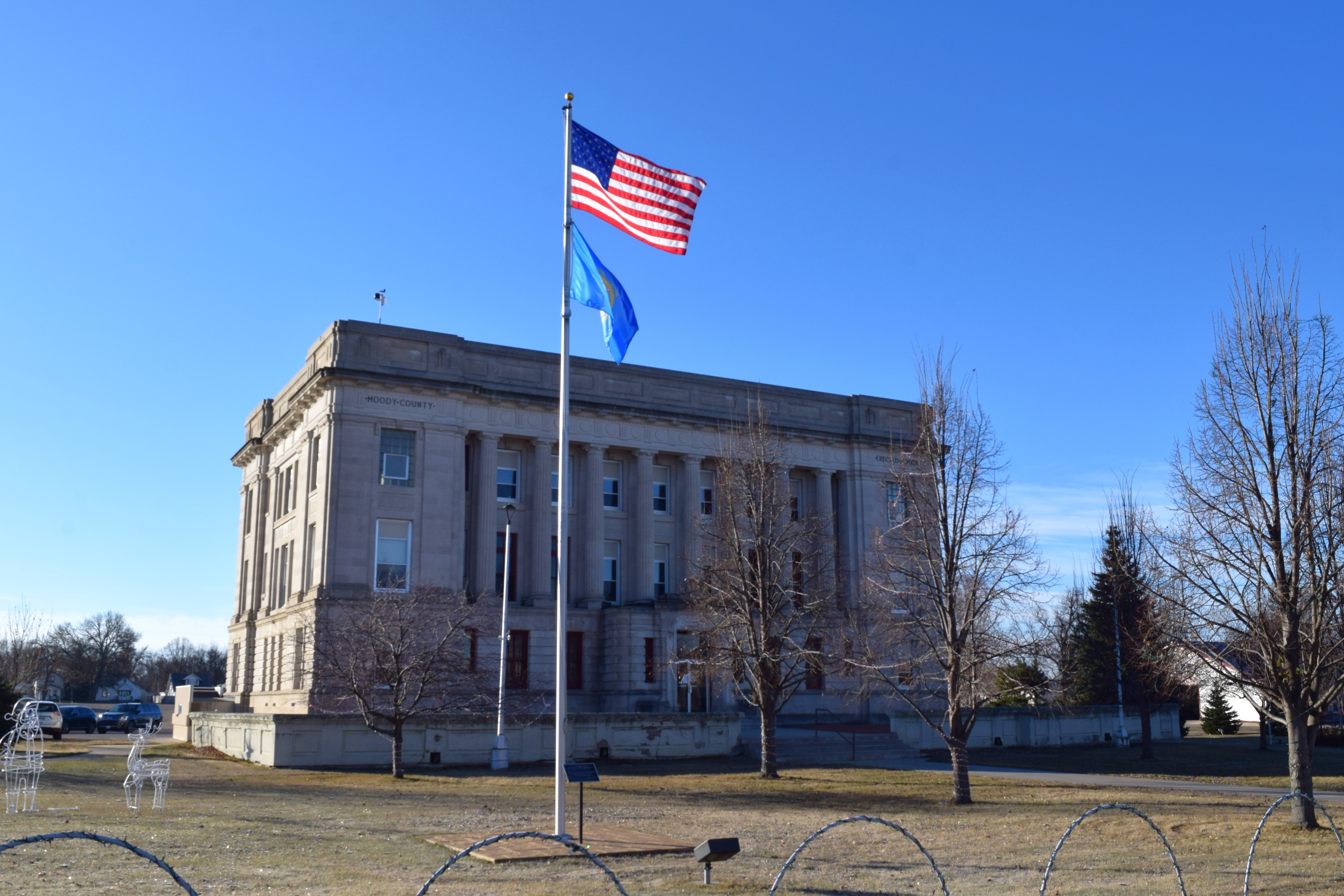
- The Moody County Courthouse in Flandreau

- Location within the U.S. state of South Dakota
- Coordinates: 44.02°N 96.67°W
- Country: United States
- State: South Dakota
- Founded: 1873
- Named for: Gideon C. Moody
- Seat: Flandreau
- Largest city: Flandreau

Area
  - Total: 521 sq mi (1,350 km^{2})
  - Land: 519 sq mi (1,340 km^{2})
  - Water: 1.4 sq mi (3.6 km^{2}) 0.3%

Population (2020)
  - Total: 6,336
  - Estimate (2025): 6,632 ▲
  - Density: 12.8/sq mi (4.9/km^{2})
- Time zone: UTC−6 (Central)
  - Summer (DST): UTC−5 (CDT)
- Congressional district: At-large
- Website: www.moodycounty.net

Moody County is a county in the U.S. state of South Dakota, United States. The population was 6,336 at the 2020 census. Its county seat is Flandreau. The county is named for Gideon C. Moody.

== Geography ==
Moody County lies on the east side of South Dakota. Its east boundary line abuts the west boundary line of the state of Minnesota. The Big Sioux River flows southerly through the center of the county. Its terrain consists of rolling hills, devoted to agriculture, with lakes in the western portion. The terrain slopes to the south, with its high point near its northeast corner, at 1,749 ft (533 m) ASL, although the east and west sides also slope into the river valley through the center of the county. The county has a total area of 521 square miles (1,350 km^{2}), of which 519 square miles (1,340 km^{2}) is land and 1.4 square miles (3.6 km^{2}) (0.3%) is water.

=== Major highways ===
- Interstate 29
- South Dakota Highway 11
- South Dakota Highway 13
- South Dakota Highway 32
- South Dakota Highway 34

=== Adjacent counties ===
- Brookings County – north
- Lincoln County, Minnesota – northeast
- Pipestone County, Minnesota – east
- Rock County, Minnesota – southeast
- Minnehaha County – south
- Lake County – west

=== Lakes ===
- Anderson Slough
- Lake Campbell (part)
- Mud Lake
- Poison Lake
- Bull Slough

=== Protected areas ===
- Anderson Slough State Game Production Area
- Boles Slough State Game Production Area
- Gideon State Game Production Area
- Hazels Haven State Game Production Area
- Kamp State Game Production Area
- Olson Lake State Game Production Area

== Demographics ==
Historical population
Census	Pop.	Note	%±
1880	3,915		—
1890	5,941		51.7%
1900	8,326		40.1%
1910	8,695		4.4%
1920	9,742		12.0%
1930	9,603		−1.4%
1940	9,341		−2.7%
1950	9,252		−1.0%
1960	8,810		−4.8%
1970	7,622		−13.5%
1980	6,692		−12.2%
1990	6,507		−2.8%
2000	6,595		1.4%
2010	6,486		−1.7%
2020	6,336		−2.3%
2025 (est.)	6,632	▲	4.7%
U.S. Decennial Census:

=== 2020 census ===
As of the 2020 census, there were 6,336 people, 2,474 households, and 1,685 families residing in the county. The population density was 12.2 inhabitants per square mile (4.7/km^{2}).

Of the residents, 26.9% were under the age of 18 and 19.7% were 65 years of age or older; the median age was 41.0 years. For every 100 females there were 103.1 males, and for every 100 females age 18 and over there were 102.8 males.

The racial makeup of the county was 76.5% White, 0.3% Black or African American, 12.0% American Indian and Alaska Native, 1.4% Asian, 3.2% from some other race, and 6.5% from two or more races. Hispanic or Latino residents of any race comprised 5.0% of the population.

There were 2,474 households in the county, of which 31.5% had children under the age of 18 living with them and 21.3% had a female householder with no spouse or partner present. About 26.9% of all households were made up of individuals and 13.0% had someone living alone who was 65 years of age or older.

There were 2,728 housing units, of which 9.3% were vacant. Among occupied housing units, 76.3% were owner-occupied and 23.7% were renter-occupied. The homeowner vacancy rate was 1.3% and the rental vacancy rate was 12.3%.

=== 2010 census ===
As of the 2010 census, there were 6,486 people, 2,554 households, and 1,751 families in the county. The population density was 12.5 inhabitants per square mile (4.8/km^{2}). There were 2,824 housing units at an average density of 5.4 units per square mile (2.1 units/km^{2}). The racial makeup of the county was 81.0% white, 14.0% American Indian, 1.1% Asian, 0.5% black or African American, 0.7% from other races, and 2.7% from two or more races. Those of Hispanic or Latino origin made up 1.7% of the population. In terms of ancestry, 39.9% were German, 20.1% were Norwegian, 8.9% were Irish, 6.1% were Dutch, 5.1% were English, and 1.6% were American.

Of the 2,554 households, 30.9% had children under the age of 18 living with them, 54.3% were married couples living together, 8.8% had a female householder with no husband present, 31.4% were non-families, and 27.4% of all households were made up of individuals. The average household size was 2.48 and the average family size was 3.00. The median age was 40.5 years.

The median income for a household in the county was $52,354 and the median income for a family was $61,667. Males had a median income of $36,364 versus $30,854 for females. The per capita income for the county was $24,948. About 4.7% of families and 7.1% of the population were below the poverty line, including 8.8% of those under age 18 and 13.1% of those age 65 or over.

== Communities ==
=== Cities ===
- Colman
- Egan
- Flandreau (county seat)

=== Towns ===
- Trent
- Ward

=== Census-designated place ===
- Pleasant Valley Colony

=== Unincorporated community ===
- Lone Tree

=== Townships ===
- Alliance
- Blinsmon
- Clare
- Colman
- Egan
- Enterprise
- Flandreau
- Fremont
- Grovena
- Jefferson
- Lone Rock
- Lynn
- Riverview
- Spring Creek
- Union
- Ward

== Politics ==
Moody County voters tend to split between the two major political parties. Between 1960 and 2012, the national election results in Moody County were almost always evenly split. Since 2016, the county has started supporting Republican candidates more strongly.

United States presidential election results for Moody County, South Dakota
Year	Republican		Democratic		Third party(ies)	
Year	No.	%	No.	%	No.	%
1892	735	53.30%	96	6.96%	548	39.74%
1896	780	43.36%	1,012	56.25%	7	0.39%
1900	1,190	56.91%	875	41.85%	26	1.24%
1904	1,471	75.13%	295	15.07%	192	9.81%
1908	1,275	63.50%	623	31.03%	110	5.48%
1912	0	0.00%	637	35.61%	1,152	64.39%
1916	973	49.09%	898	45.31%	111	5.60%
1920	1,667	63.55%	371	14.14%	585	22.30%
1924	1,181	41.69%	234	8.26%	1,418	50.05%
1928	2,108	59.63%	1,416	40.06%	11	0.31%
1932	1,289	33.00%	2,547	65.21%	70	1.79%
1936	1,992	43.68%	2,366	51.89%	202	4.43%
1940	2,749	60.17%	1,820	39.83%	0	0.00%
1944	2,080	59.43%	1,420	40.57%	0	0.00%
1948	1,691	50.19%	1,630	48.38%	48	1.42%
1952	2,728	71.47%	1,089	28.53%	0	0.00%
1956	2,133	53.69%	1,840	46.31%	0	0.00%
1960	2,119	52.49%	1,918	47.51%	0	0.00%
1964	1,461	38.84%	2,301	61.16%	0	0.00%
1968	1,689	48.87%	1,614	46.70%	153	4.43%
1972	1,648	46.37%	1,895	53.32%	11	0.31%
1976	1,475	43.03%	1,942	56.65%	11	0.32%
1980	1,807	51.93%	1,364	39.20%	309	8.88%
1984	1,633	50.59%	1,586	49.13%	9	0.28%
1988	1,161	40.19%	1,715	59.36%	13	0.45%
1992	898	28.93%	1,473	47.45%	733	23.61%
1996	1,024	37.01%	1,443	52.15%	300	10.84%
2000	1,361	49.76%	1,318	48.19%	56	2.05%
2004	1,790	51.87%	1,609	46.62%	52	1.51%
2008	1,508	46.34%	1,663	51.11%	83	2.55%
2012	1,535	50.61%	1,429	47.12%	69	2.27%
2016	1,731	59.02%	1,043	35.56%	159	5.42%
2020	1,951	60.85%	1,179	36.77%	76	2.37%
2024	2,068	64.85%	1,052	32.99%	69	2.16%

== Education ==
School districts include:

- Brookings School District 05-1
- Chester School District 39-1
- Colman-Egan School District 50-5
- Dell Rapids School District 49-3
- Elkton School District 05-3
- Flandreau School District 50-3
- Oldham-Ramona-Rutland School District 39-6
- Sioux Valley School District 05-5

The Rutland School District 39-4, in the county, consolidated into ORR in 2023.

== See also ==
- National Register of Historic Places listings in Moody County, South Dakota
