= Moody County Courthouse =

- U.S. National Register of Historic Places
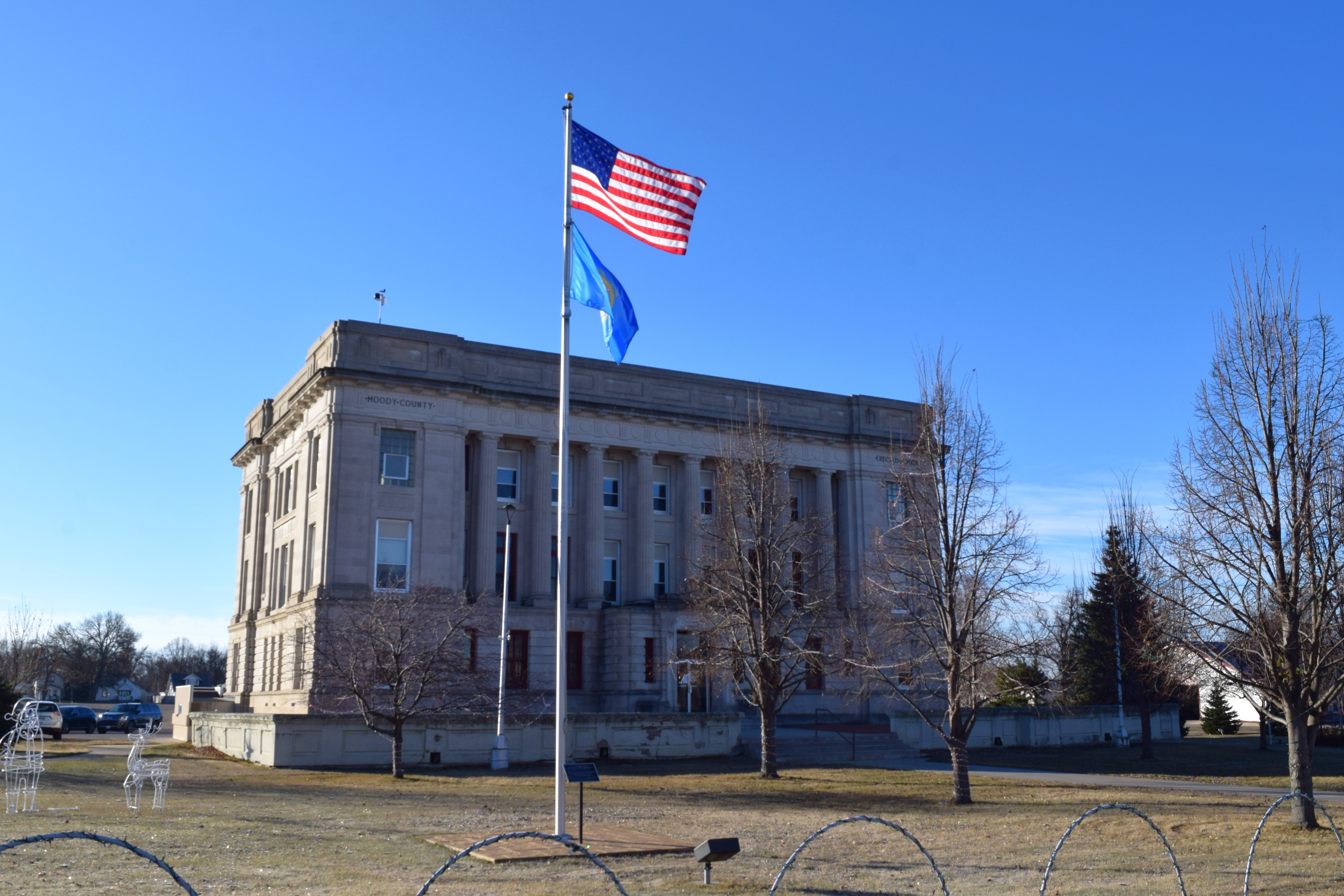

- Location within South Dakota Location within the United States
- Location: Pipestone Ave. between Crescent and Wind Sts., Flandreau, South Dakota
- Coordinates: 44°02′53″N 96°35′38″W
- Area: less than one acre
- Built: 1915
- Built by: Olsen, O.H.
- Architect: Joseph Schwarz
- Architectural style: Classical Revival
- MPS: County Courthouses of South Dakota MPS
- NRHP reference No.: 92001863
- Added to NRHP: February 10, 1993

The Moody County Courthouse in Flandreau, South Dakota, United States, was built in 1915. It was listed on the National Register of Historic Places in 1993.

It is a three-story building clad with brick and sandstone. Its design is in Classical Revival style with Greek Revival details. It was designed by Joseph Schwarz and built by contractor O.H. Olsen.

== See also ==
- Flandreau Masonic Temple, also NRHP-listed, which was the Old Moody County Courthouse.
