= Elkton, South Dakota =

- City
- Motto: "A Community Willing To Grow Together"
- Location in Brookings County and the state of South Dakota
- Coordinates: 44°14′06″N 96°28′46″W
- Country: United States
- State: South Dakota
- County: Brookings
- Platted: 1880
- Incorporated: 1908

Government
  - Mayor: Charles Remund

Area
  - Total: 1.49 sq mi (3.87 km^{2})
  - Land: 1.49 sq mi (3.87 km^{2})
  - Water: 0 sq mi (0.00 km^{2})
- Elevation: 1,752 ft (534 m)

Population (2020)
  - Total: 755
  - Density: 505.5/sq mi (195.17/km^{2})
- Time zone: UTC-6 (Central (CST))
  - Summer (DST): UTC-5 (CDT)
- ZIP code: 57026
- Area code: 605
- FIPS code: 46-18700
- GNIS feature ID: 1267379
- Website: elktonsd.com

Elkton is a city in Brookings County, South Dakota, United States. The population was 755 at the 2020 census. Some of Elkton's population also have Minnesota addresses since the city is located so close to the state line.

== History ==
Elkton was platted in the spring of 1880. It was named after the city of Elkton, Maryland. By 1881, around two hundred people lived in the settlement.

== Geography ==
According to the United States Census Bureau, the city has a total area of 1.55 square miles (4.01 km^{2}), all land.

== Demographics ==
Historical population
Census	Pop.	Note	%±
1890	331		—
1900	578		74.6%
1910	742		28.4%
1920	872		17.5%
1930	856		−1.8%
1940	779		−9.0%
1950	657		−15.7%
1960	621		−5.5%
1970	541		−12.9%
1980	632		16.8%
1990	602		−4.7%
2000	677		12.5%
2010	736		8.7%
2020	755		2.6%
U.S. Decennial Census

Since 2008 there have been 28 single family units added to the community.

=== 2020 census ===
As of the 2020 census, Elkton had a population of 755, and the median age was 34.2 years with 27.8% of residents under the age of 18 and 13.5% aged 65 or older. For every 100 females there were 116.3 males, and for every 100 females age 18 and over there were 128.0 males age 18 and over.

0.0% of residents lived in urban areas, while 100.0% lived in rural areas.

There were 285 households in Elkton, of which 35.4% had children under the age of 18 living in them. Of all households, 52.6% were married-couple households, 22.5% were households with a male householder and no spouse or partner present, and 16.5% were households with a female householder and no spouse or partner present. About 20.7% of all households were made up of individuals and 10.6% had someone living alone who was 65 years of age or older.

There were 328 housing units, of which 13.1% were vacant. The homeowner vacancy rate was 0.0% and the rental vacancy rate was 26.0%.

Racial composition as of the 2020 census
Race	Number	Percent
White	604	80.0%
Black or African American	6	0.8%
American Indian and Alaska Native	16	2.1%
Asian	2	0.3%
Native Hawaiian and Other Pacific Islander	0	0.0%
Some other race	98	13.0%
Two or more races	29	3.8%
Hispanic or Latino (of any race)	137	18.1%

=== 2010 census ===
As of the census of 2010, there were 736 people, 286 households, and 190 families residing in the city. The population density was 474.8 inhabitants per square mile (183.3/km^{2}). There were 324 housing units at an average density of 209.0 per square mile (80.7/km^{2}). The racial makeup of the city was 85.2% White, 0.4% African American, 12.1% from other races, and 2.3% from two or more races. Hispanic or Latino of any race were 14.5% of the population.

There were 286 households, of which 32.9% had children under the age of 18 living with them, 53.5% were married couples living together, 7.3% had a female householder with no husband present, 5.6% had a male householder with no wife present, and 33.6% were non-families. 28.7% of all households were made up of individuals, and 14% had someone living alone who was 65 years of age or older. The average household size was 2.53 and the average family size was 3.12.

The median age in the city was 31.9 years. 26.6% of residents were under the age of 18; 7.8% were between the ages of 18 and 24; 29.3% were from 25 to 44; 22.1% were from 45 to 64; and 14.1% were 65 years of age or older. The gender makeup of the city was 51.8% male and 48.2% female.

=== 2000 census ===
As of the census of 2000, there were 677 people, 267 households, and 185 families residing in the city. The population density was 436.2 inhabitants per square mile (168.4/km^{2}). There were 289 housing units at an average density of 186.2 per square mile (71.9/km^{2}). The racial makeup of the city was 98.82% White, 0.15% African American, 0.30% Native American, and 0.74% from two or more races. Hispanic or Latino of any race were 0.44% of the population.

There were 267 households, out of which 33.0% had children under the age of 18 living with them, 57.3% were married couples living together, 8.2% had a female householder with no husband present, and 30.7% were non-families. 27.7% of all households were made up of individuals, and 17.2% had someone living alone who was 65 years of age or older. The average household size was 2.51 and the average family size was 3.08.

In the city, the population was spread out, with 27.9% under the age of 18, 6.8% from 18 to 24, 24.1% from 25 to 44, 21.1% from 45 to 64, and 20.1% who were 65 years of age or older. The median age was 39 years. For every 100 females, there were 96.2 males. For every 100 females age 18 and over, there were 96.8 males.

The median income for a household in the city was $36,667, and the median income for a family was $47,969. Males had a median income of $30,313 versus $21,667 for females. The per capita income for the city was $18,912. About 5.9% of families and 6.8% of the population were below the poverty line, including 2.9% of those under age 18 and 18.7% of those age 65 or over.

== Education ==
It is in the Elkton School District 05-3.

The Elkton Public School is the only school in Elkton. It is home to the grades of Kindergarten through 12th Grade and includes pre-school. The high school has won multiple state championships since it began and was the first to win three state championships in Boys Basketball. In 2010 the Girls Basketball team won the Class A State Tournament.

== See also ==
- List of cities in South Dakota
