= Flandreau, South Dakota =

Flandreau
- City
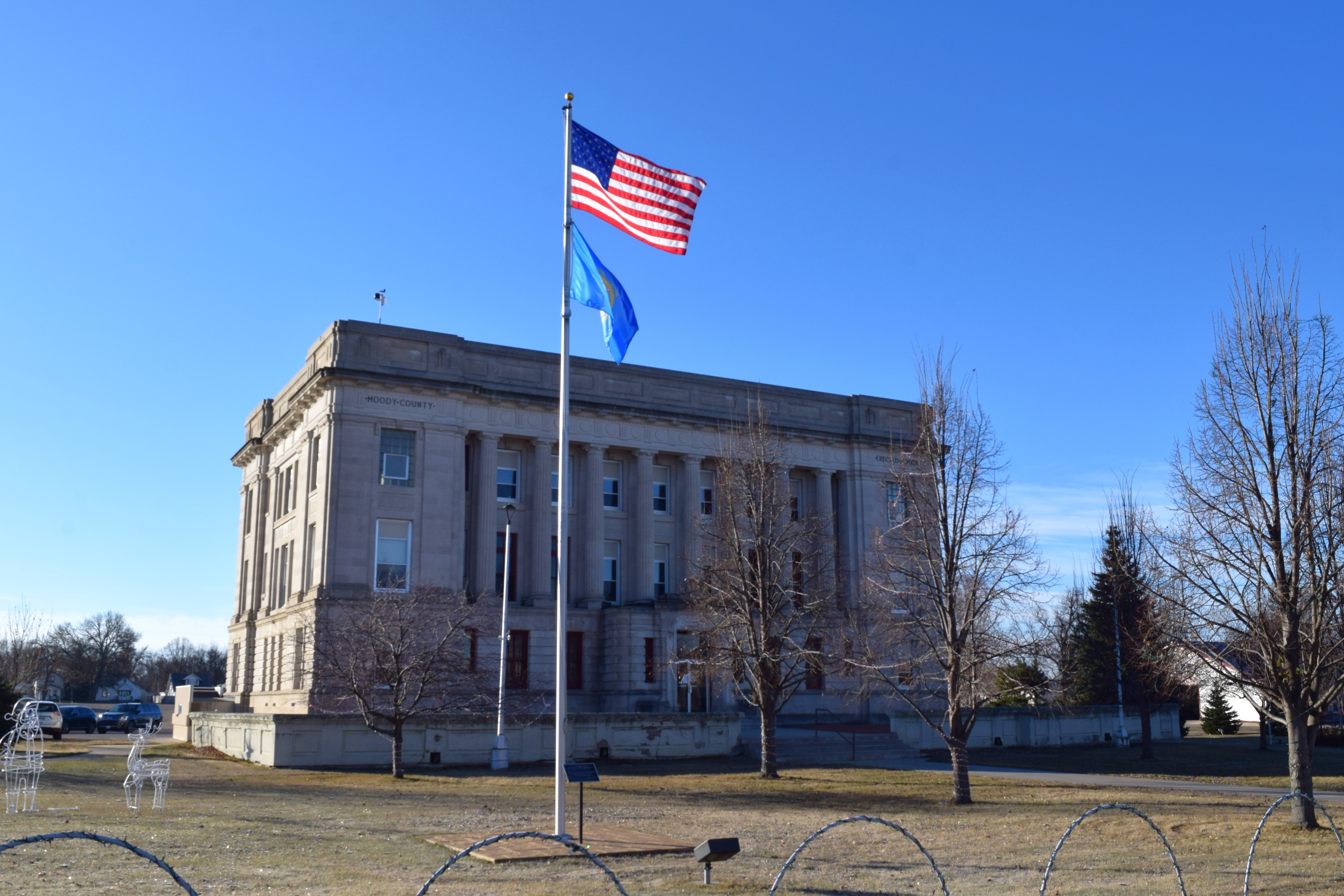
- Moody County Courthouse
- Motto: "The Heart Of South Dakota"
- Location in Moody County and the state of South Dakota
- Coordinates: 44°02′47″N 96°35′54″W
- Country: United States
- State: South Dakota
- County: Moody
- Incorporated (city): 1902

Area
  - Total: 1.93 sq mi (4.99 km^{2})
  - Land: 1.86 sq mi (4.81 km^{2})
  - Water: 0.066 sq mi (0.17 km^{2})
- Elevation: 1,565 ft (477 m)

Population (2020)
  - Total: 2,372
  - Density: 1,276.1/sq mi (492.72/km^{2})
- Time zone: UTC−6 (Central (CST))
  - Summer (DST): UTC−5 (CDT)
- ZIP code: 57028
- Area code: 605
- FIPS code: 46-21540
- GNIS feature ID: 1267391
- Website: www.cityofflandreau.com

Flandreau /ˈflændruː/ FLAN-droo is a city in and county seat of Moody County, South Dakota, United States. The population was 2,372 at the 2020 census. It was named in honor of Charles Eugene Flandrau, a judge in the territory and state of Minnesota. He is credited with saving the community of New Ulm, Minnesota, from destruction during conflict with the Sioux tribe in 1862.

In 2015, the nearby federally recognized Flandreau Indian Reservation of Santee Sioux had planned to open the nation's first recreational marijuana lounge in a former bowling alley, close to its existing Royal River Casino and Hotel. Any tourists or non-tribal members using marijuana on tribal land risked state prosecution, so they abandoned the plan.

== Geography ==
Flandreau is located along the Big Sioux River.

According to the United States Census Bureau, the city has a total area of 1.93 square miles (5.00 km^{2}), of which 1.86 square miles (4.82 km^{2}) is land and 0.07 square miles (0.18 km^{2}) is water.

=== Climate ===
Climate data for Flandreau, South Dakota (1991−2020 normals, extremes 1893−present)
Month	Jan	Feb	Mar	Apr	May	Jun	Jul	Aug	Sep	Oct	Nov	Dec	Year
Record high °F (°C)	64 (18)	70 (21)	87 (31)	94 (34)	106 (41)	105 (41)	112 (44)	108 (42)	104 (40)	94 (34)	79 (26)	65 (18)	112 (44)
Mean maximum °F (°C)	43.1 (6.2)	49.0 (9.4)	65.9 (18.8)	79.5 (26.4)	86.7 (30.4)	91.6 (33.1)	93.0 (33.9)	91.1 (32.8)	87.5 (30.8)	81.5 (27.5)	63.7 (17.6)	46.6 (8.1)	95.4 (35.2)
Mean daily maximum °F (°C)	22.6 (−5.2)	27.6 (−2.4)	39.7 (4.3)	54.4 (12.4)	67.0 (19.4)	76.8 (24.9)	81.3 (27.4)	79.0 (26.1)	72.3 (22.4)	58.2 (14.6)	41.4 (5.2)	27.5 (−2.5)	54.0 (12.2)
Daily mean °F (°C)	13.1 (−10.5)	17.3 (−8.2)	29.5 (−1.4)	42.9 (6.1)	55.8 (13.2)	66.4 (19.1)	70.6 (21.4)	68.1 (20.1)	60.0 (15.6)	46.2 (7.9)	31.2 (−0.4)	18.6 (−7.4)	43.3 (6.3)
Mean daily minimum °F (°C)	3.5 (−15.8)	7.0 (−13.9)	19.3 (−7.1)	31.4 (−0.3)	44.7 (7.1)	56.1 (13.4)	59.9 (15.5)	57.2 (14.0)	47.8 (8.8)	34.2 (1.2)	21.1 (−6.1)	9.6 (−12.4)	32.7 (0.4)
Mean minimum °F (°C)	−20.1 (−28.9)	−14.3 (−25.7)	−4.9 (−20.5)	17.1 (−8.3)	30.6 (−0.8)	44.0 (6.7)	48.6 (9.2)	45.6 (7.6)	32.3 (0.2)	18.3 (−7.6)	2.3 (−16.5)	−13.0 (−25.0)	−23.6 (−30.9)
Record low °F (°C)	−40 (−40)	−38 (−39)	−24 (−31)	−2 (−19)	16 (−9)	29 (−2)	35 (2)	32 (0)	15 (−9)	−12 (−24)	−20 (−29)	−35 (−37)	−40 (−40)
Average precipitation inches (mm)	0.54 (14)	0.76 (19)	1.32 (34)	2.67 (68)	4.12 (105)	4.53 (115)	3.81 (97)	3.60 (91)	3.07 (78)	2.21 (56)	1.01 (26)	0.85 (22)	28.49 (724)
Average snowfall inches (cm)	5.8 (15)	8.2 (21)	6.2 (16)	4.8 (12)	0.1 (0.25)	0.0 (0.0)	0.0 (0.0)	0.0 (0.0)	0.0 (0.0)	1.2 (3.0)	5.6 (14)	8.5 (22)	40.4 (103)
Average precipitation days (≥ 0.01 in)	5.4	5.6	5.9	7.9	10.0	9.8	7.5	7.1	6.3	5.9	4.5	5.7	81.6
Average snowy days (≥ 0.1 in)	4.9	5.0	3.1	2.0	0.1	0.0	0.0	0.0	0.0	0.9	2.5	5.1	23.6
Source: NOAA

== Demographics ==
Historical population
Census	Pop.	Note	%±
1880	471		—
1890	569		20.8%
1900	1,244		118.6%
1910	1,484		19.3%
1920	1,929		30.0%
1930	1,934		0.3%
1940	2,212		14.4%
1950	2,193		−0.9%
1960	2,129		−2.9%
1970	2,027		−4.8%
1980	2,114		4.3%
1990	2,311		9.3%
2000	2,376		2.8%
2010	2,341		−1.5%
2020	2,372		1.3%
U.S. Decennial Census

=== 2020 census ===
As of the 2020 census, Flandreau had a population of 2,372. The median age was 39.5 years. 27.3% of residents were under the age of 18 and 22.3% of residents were 65 years of age or older. For every 100 females there were 96.8 males, and for every 100 females age 18 and over there were 91.0 males age 18 and over.

0.0% of residents lived in urban areas, while 100.0% lived in rural areas.

There were 951 households in Flandreau, of which 31.0% had children under the age of 18 living in them. Of all households, 36.5% were married-couple households, 21.2% were households with a male householder and no spouse or partner present, and 32.9% were households with a female householder and no spouse or partner present. About 36.7% of all households were made up of individuals and 18.1% had someone living alone who was 65 years of age or older.

There were 1,072 housing units, of which 11.3% were vacant. The homeowner vacancy rate was 1.9% and the rental vacancy rate was 15.0%.

Racial composition as of the 2020 census
Race	Number	Percent
White	1,304	55.0%
Black or African American	9	0.4%
American Indian and Alaska Native	581	24.5%
Asian	81	3.4%
Native Hawaiian and Other Pacific Islander	0	0.0%
Some other race	152	6.4%
Two or more races	245	10.3%
Hispanic or Latino (of any race)	248	10.5%

=== 2010 census ===
As of the census of 2010, there were 2,341 people, 973 households, and 583 families living in the city. The population density was 1,258.6 inhabitants per square mile (485.9/km^{2}). There were 1,091 housing units at an average density of 586.6 per square mile (226.5/km^{2}). The racial makeup of the city was 64.2% White, 0.5% African American, 27.7% Native American, 2.3% Asian, 1.5% from other races, and 3.8% from two or more races. Hispanic or Latino of any race were 3.5% of the population.

There were 973 households, of which 29.4% had children under the age of 18 living with them, 39.6% were married couples living together, 12.8% had a female householder with no husband present, 7.5% had a male householder with no wife present, and 40.1% were non-families. 34.5% of all households were made up of individuals, and 15.8% had someone living alone who was 65 years of age or older. The average household size was 2.35 and the average family size was 3.00.

The median age in the city was 38.4 years. 25.9% of residents were under the age of 18; 8.2% were between the ages of 18 and 24; 22.3% were from 25 to 44; 25.1% were from 45 to 64; and 18.6% were 65 years of age or older. The gender makeup of the city was 47.3% male and 52.7% female.

=== 2000 census ===
As of the census of 2000, there were 2,376 people, 986 households, and 605 families living in the city. The population density was 1,370.9 inhabitants per square mile (529.3/km^{2}). There were 1,090 housing units at an average density of 628.9 per square mile (242.8/km^{2}). The racial makeup of the city was 70.62% White, 0.46% African American, 24.92% Native American, 1.22% Asian, 0.08% from other races, and 2.69% from two or more races. Hispanic or Latino of any race were 1.05% of the population.

There were 986 households, out of which 30.5% had children under the age of 18 living with them, 43.6% were married couples living together, 12.7% had a female householder with no husband present, and 38.6% were non-families. 34.3% of all households were made up of individuals, and 18.5% had someone living alone who was 65 years of age or older. The average household size was 2.35 and the average family size was 2.96.

In the city, the population was spread out, with 26.4% under the age of 18, 8.7% from 18 to 24, 24.2% from 25 to 44, 20.0% from 45 to 64, and 20.8% who were 65 years of age or older. The median age was 38 years. For every 100 females, there were 88.9 males. For every 100 females age 18 and over, there were 84.1 males.

As of 2000 the median income for a household in the city was $31,090, and the median income for a family was $40,272. Males had a median income of $26,369 versus $19,738 for females. The per capita income for the city was $15,895. About 9.8% of families and 12.2% of the population were below the poverty line, including 18.2% of those under age 18 and 10.9% of those age 65 or over.

== Early history ==
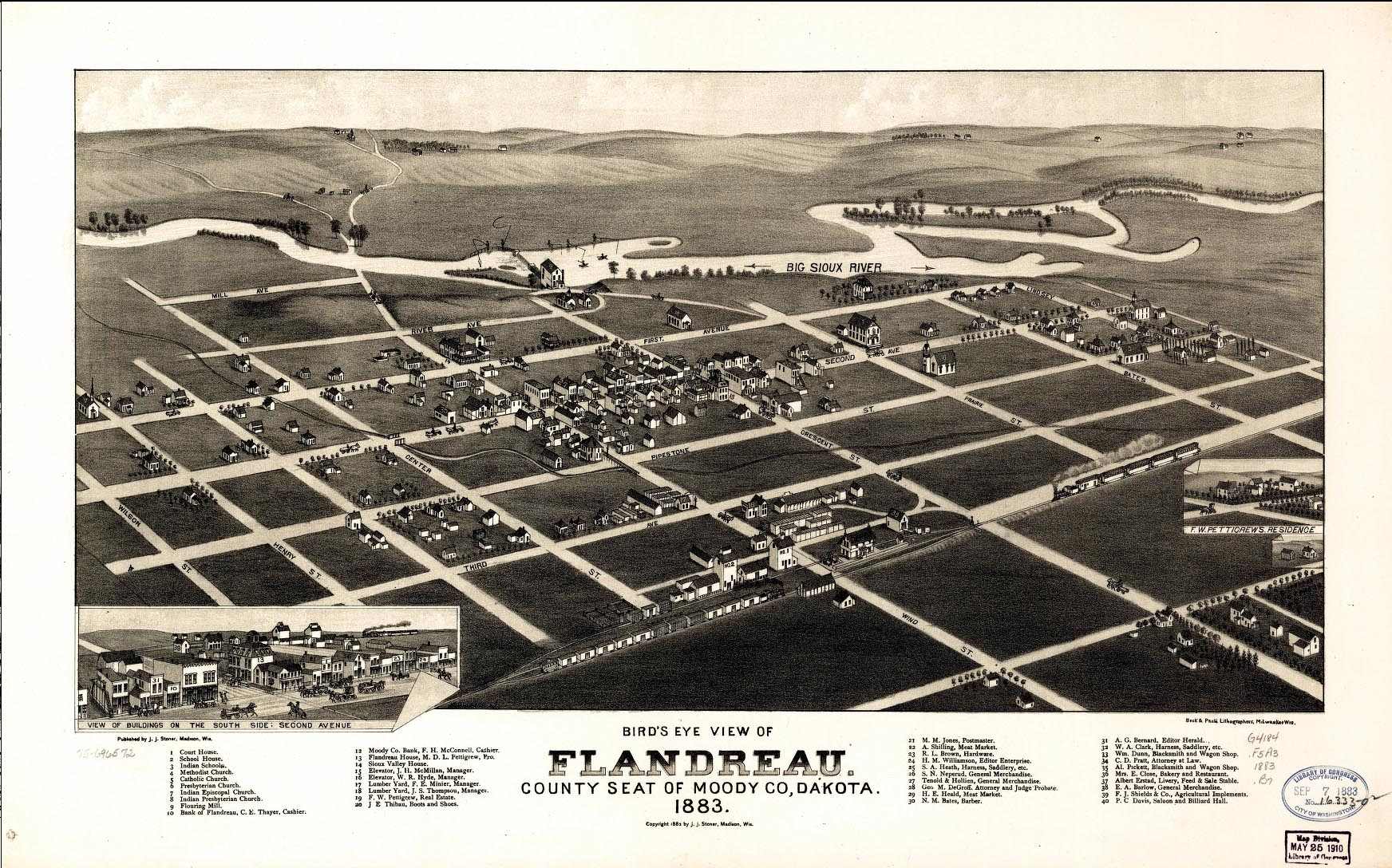
1883 illustration of Flandreau

The British established a Hudson's Bay Company trading post in 1763 in this area. Present-day Flandreau developed near there, with people attracted to the community because of trading business.

The town of Flandreau was originally settled in 1857, and named for U.S. Indian Agent Charles E. Flandrau. (In the early years, it was sometimes spelled as 'Flandrau'.) Like other settlements in the region, it was abandoned within a year, as a result of threatening activities of the Yankton Sioux during the Indian Wars. They were trying to expel European Americans from their territory.

In 1869, following the American Civil War, the area was resettled by twenty-five families of Christianized Sioux from the Santee reservation. White settlement resumed in 1872. When Moody County was organized in 1873, Flandreau was designated as the county seat.

Richard F. Pettigrew of Sioux Falls, South Dakota, a relative of Pettigrew settlers in Flandreau, promoted establishing an Indian School at Flandreau as part of what was his successful 1889 campaign in the state legislature to be elected for the U.S. Senate. The federal government authorized a school here, and what was first known as the Riggs Institute was opened in 1892. The Bureau of Indian Affairs took over a former Presbyterian Church mission school for the facility.

It has been known as the Flandreau Indian School, an off-reservation Indian boarding school operated by the Bureau of Indian Education (BIE) (an agency established in 2006).

== Landmarks ==
The Flandreau Indian Reservation of the Santee Sioux is in the area.

== Education ==
Flandreau School District 50-3 is the local public school district operated by the state. It operates Flandreau Elementary School, Flandreau Middle School, and Flandreau High School.

Flandreau Indian School is in the area.

== Notable people ==
- Gene Amdahl (1922-2015), computer architect known for Amdahl's Law
- Dell L. Dailey, American military officer
- Roger W. Hunt (1938-2018), South Dakota legislator
- Bill Janklow (1939-2012), politician, South Dakota Attorney General and Governor

== See also ==
- List of cities in South Dakota
- Flandreau Indians
