= Transportation in South Dakota =

This article describes transportation in the U.S. state of South Dakota.

== Roads ==
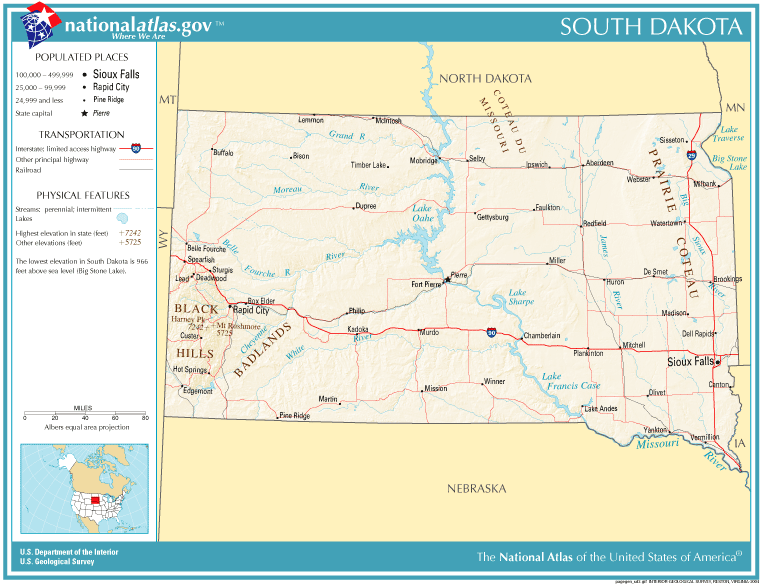
Map showing the interstates and primary highways in South Dakota.

South Dakota has a total of 83,609 miles (134,556 km) of highways, roads, and streets, along with 679 miles (1,093 km) of interstate highways. South Dakota and Montana are the only states sharing a land border which is not traversed by a paved road.

=== Interstate highways ===
Two major interstates pass through South Dakota: Interstate 90, which runs east and west; and Interstate 29, running north and south in the eastern portion of the state. Also located in the state are the shorter interstates 190, a spur into central Rapid City, and 229, a loop around eastern and southern Sioux Falls.

The length of South Dakota's portion of I-29 is 252 miles (406 km). Larger cities served by the route include Watertown, Brookings, Sioux Falls, and Vermillion. The I-29 corridor features generally higher rates of population and economic growth than areas in eastern South Dakota that are further from the interstate.

I-90 runs through the state for a distance of 413 miles (665 km), crossing the Missouri River near Chamberlain. Major cities along the route include Sioux Falls, Mitchell, Rapid City, Sturgis and Spearfish. I-90, being a major route between western national parks and large cities to the east, brings many out-of-state travelers through South Dakota, thus helping to boost the tourism and hospitality industries. A number of tourist attractions are located along the route, including the Corn Palace in Mitchell and Wall Drug in Wall.

=== Other highways ===
Several major U.S. highways pass through the state. U.S. routes 12, 14, 16, 18, and 212 travel east and west, while U.S. routes 81, 83, 85 and 281 run north and south.

South Dakota Highway 100 is a planned limited access road in Sioux Falls. Originally known as the Eastern Corridor, the highway will wrap around the eastern and southern sections of the city, running from Exit 402 on Interstate 90 in the north and intersecting with Interstate 29 near Tea. Planning for the 17-mile (27 km) route began in 1995.

=== Scenic byways ===
South Dakota contains two National Scenic Byways. The Peter Norbeck National Scenic Byway is located in the Black Hills, while the Native American Scenic Byway runs along the Missouri River in the north-central part of the state. Other scenic byways include the Badlands Loop Scenic Byway, the Spearfish Canyon Scenic Byway, and the Wildlife Loop Road Scenic Byway.

== Railroads ==
Railroads have played an important role in South Dakota transportation since the late-19th century. Historically, the Milwaukee Road and the Chicago & North Western were the state's largest railroads, and the Milwaukee's east-west transcontinental line traversed the northern tier of the state. Some 4,420 miles (7,110 km) of railroad track were built in South Dakota during the late nineteenth and early twentieth centuries, but only 1,839 miles (2,960 km) are active. BNSF Railway is currently the largest railroad in South Dakota, primarily operating former Milwaukee Road trackage; the Rapid City, Pierre and Eastern is the state's other major carrier, mostly operating former Chicago & North Western trackage. Rail transportation in the state is confined only to freight, however, as South Dakota is one of the few states without any Amtrak service.

Most of the traffic was freight, but the main lines also offered passenger service. After the European immigrants settled down, there never were many people moving about inside the state. Profits were slim. Automobiles and buses were much more popular, but there was an upsurge in train use during World War II when gasoline was scarce. All passenger service was ended in the state by 1970.

== Air ==
South Dakota's largest commercial airports in terms of passenger traffic are the Sioux Falls Regional Airport and Rapid City Regional Airport. Delta Air Lines, Frontier Airlines, United Airlines, American Airlines, and Allegiant Airlines, as well as commuter airlines using the brand affiliation with major airlines serve the two largest airports. Several other cities in the state also have commercial air service, some of which is subsidized by the Essential Air Service program.

== Public Transit ==
Public transit played a large role in the development of cities in South Dakota. There were seven cities with a streetcar system in the nineteenth and twentieth centuries, however, all of these were discontinued over time. Today, only four fixed route public transit systems exist in the state, those being in Sioux Falls, Rapid City, North Sioux City and on the Yankton Reservation.

== Laws and licenses ==
The speed limit in South Dakota is 80 miles per hour (129 km/h) on rural interstates, regardless of vehicle type and time of day, and 65 mph (105 km/h) on urban interstates and other highways, or up to 70 mph (113 km/h) on multilane, divided non-interstate roadways.

South Dakota license plates are numbered with the first digit referring to the county of origin. Counties 1–9 are ranked by 1950 population, and counties 10–64 are numbered alphabetically.

Studded tires are permitted to be used from October 1 to April 30, except on school buses and fire vehicles which are permitted year round.

== See also ==
- Plug-in electric vehicles in South Dakota
