= Interstate 29 in South Dakota =

Highway in South Dakota

Interstate 29
- I-29 highlighted in red

Route information
- Maintained by SDDOT
- Length: 252.50 mi (406.36 km)
- NHS: Entire route

Major junctions
- South end: I-29 at the Iowa state line in North Sioux City
- US 18 concurrency near Canton; I-229 in Sioux Falls; I-90 near Sioux Falls; US 14 in Brookings; US 212 in Watertown; US 81 near Watertown; US 12 near Summit
- North end: I-29 / US 81 at the North Dakota state line near Victor

Location
- Country: United States
- State: South Dakota
- Counties: Union, Lincoln, Minnehaha, Moody, Brookings, Deuel, Hamlin, Codington, Grant, Roberts

Highway system
- Interstate Highway System; Main; Auxiliary; Suffixed; Business; Future; South Dakota State Trunk Highway System; Interstate; US; State
← SD 28	→ SD 30

Interstate 29 (I-29) is a north–south Interstate Highway in the midwestern United States. In the state of South Dakota, I-29 traverses on the eastern side of the state from the Iowa border near Sioux City to the North Dakota border near New Effington. On its route, I-29 passes through western portions of Sioux Falls, the state's largest city. It travels 252.5 miles (406.4 km) in the state, the longest stretch of any of the four states through which it passes. I-229, the highway's lone auxiliary route in South Dakota, serves as a bypass around southern and eastern Sioux Falls.

== Route description ==
The South Dakota section of I-29 is defined in South Dakota Consolidated Laws § 31-4-152. All of I-29 in South Dakota is included in the National Highway System, a system of highways important to the nation's defense, economy, and mobility. Average daily traffic volume on I-29 in South Dakota is relatively low by Interstate Highway standards. Most segments of I-29 outside of Sioux Falls receive between 5,000 and 20,000 vehicles per day, with numbers as high as 50,000 being reported in Sioux Falls.

The speed limit on I-29 in South Dakota is 80 mph (130 km/h) on most segments, but 65 mph (105 km/h) in Dakota Dunes and North Sioux City from the Iowa state line to exit 4, in Tea from exit 73 to exit 75, and in Sioux Falls from exit 75 to exit 84.

=== Sioux City to Sioux Falls ===
An older version of the I-29 shield as used in South Dakota, still commonly seen along the route

I-29 crosses from Iowa into South Dakota at the Big Sioux River and enters the state in Union County. Exit 1, the highway's first exit in South Dakota, serves unincorporated Dakota Dunes. North Sioux City, the first city the highway enters in the state, can be accessed from exits 2 and 4. At exit 9 is the next community, Jefferson. Highway 105 (SD 105) formerly ran parallel to I-29, with southern terminus at exit 2 and northern terminus at exit 9. North of Jefferson, I-29 has a business loop in Elk Point. This business loop also serves the southern terminus of SD 11, a state route that runs parallel to I-29 through much of southern South Dakota. Farther north of Elk Point, the route runs northwest until its interchange with SD 50 at exit 26. This exit serves the cities of Vermillion and Yankton. After this exit, the highway curves north and heads for Beresford. Five miles (8.0 km) north at exit 31, the highway intersects SD 48. I-29 has one exit in Beresford, exit 47 serving SD 46, just after leaving Union County and entering Lincoln County. Beginning at exit 59, the highway runs concurrent with U.S. Route 18 (US 18). At exit 62, the concurrency with US 18 ends as US 18 branches to the east to serve Canton.

North of Canton, I-29 begins to serve suburbs of Sioux Falls. Exit 71 serves Harrisburg and exit 73 serves Tea. Two miles (3.2 km) north of the Tea interchange, the Interstate enters Sioux Falls, the largest city in South Dakota. The highway has eight exits in Sioux Falls. The first exit in the city serves I-229, a short auxiliary route that circles through the southern and eastern portions of the city. Just north of this interchange, I-29 enters Minnehaha County, the most populous county in South Dakota. At exit 77, I-29 shares an interchange with 41st Street. A diverging-diamond interchange is to be constructed at this interchange, and will be completed in the summer of 2024. At exit 79, the highway shares an interchange with SD 42, known as 12th Street. This exit, a single-point urban interchange, serves downtown Sioux Falls. Exit 81 serves Russell Street, which leads to the new Denny Sanford PREMIER Center and the Sioux Falls Arena. At exit 83, I-29 intersects SD 38, also known as 60th Street North, which serves the Sioux Falls Regional Airport. Just north of the Sioux Falls city limits at exits 84A and 84B, a cloverleaf interchange, I-29 reaches I-90, the only other two-digit Interstate in South Dakota. Exit 84A to I-90 east leads to the suburb of Brandon. Two miles (3.2 km) north of the interchange with I-90, the highway reaches exit 86, which serves Renner and Crooks, the two northernmost suburbs of Sioux Falls.

=== Sioux Falls to North Dakota ===
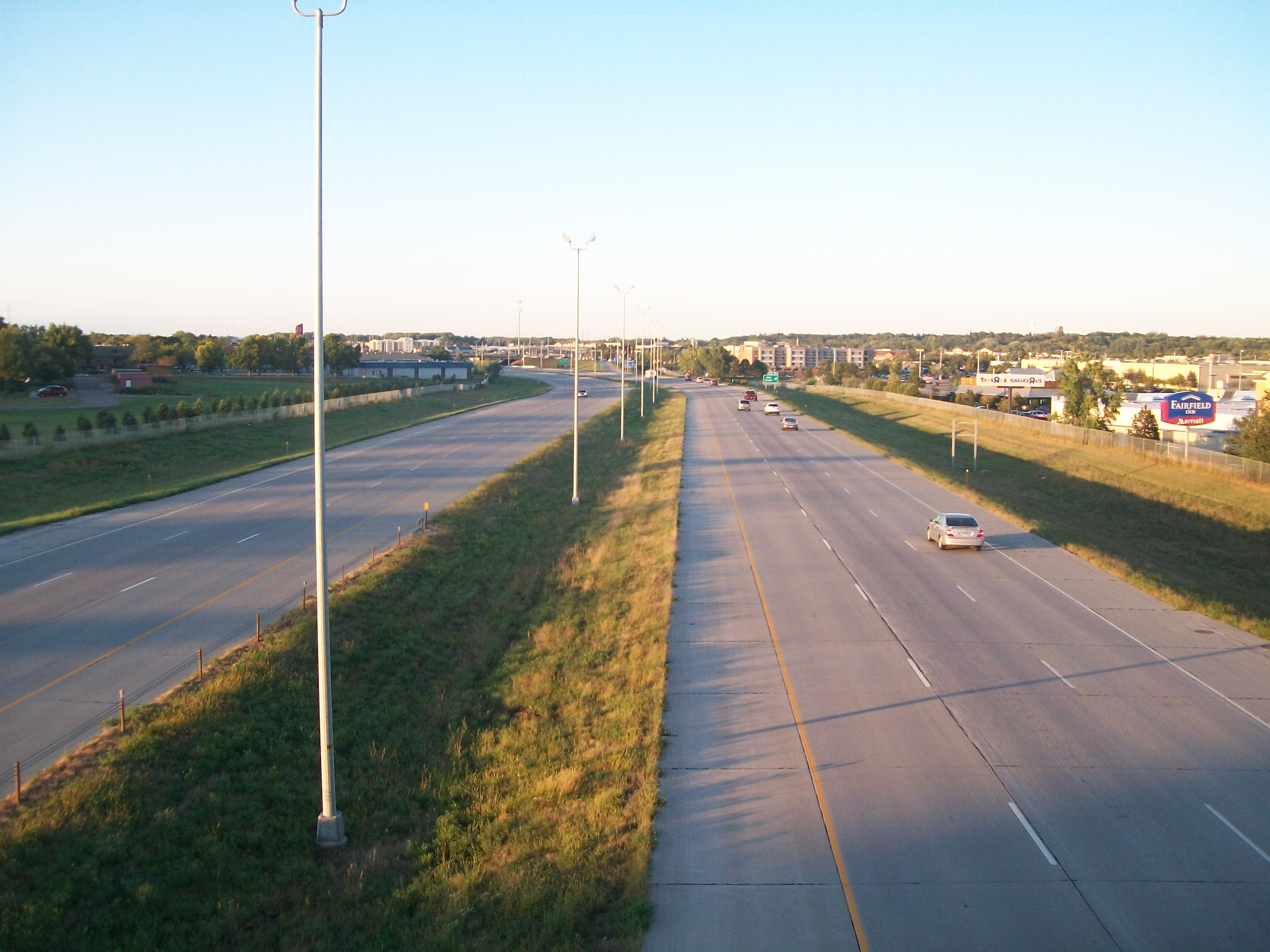
I-29 northbound in Sioux Falls

After leaving the Sioux Falls area, I-29 continues north toward Brookings. The highway serves the EROS Data Center and United States Geological Survey near Baltic. The highway then continues north and intersects the northern terminus of SD 115 west of Dell Rapids. This is I-29's last exit before leaving Minnehaha County and entering Moody County. The highway continues due north to an interchange with SD 34 near Madison. Just five miles (8.0 km) north of here, the route shares an interchange with SD 32, a highway that serves nearby Flandreau, South Dakota. The highway has a rest stop north of the Flandreau exit before entering Brookings County. The highway's first exit in Brookings County, serves SD 324. After this interchange, I-29 enters Brookings and has two exits in the city. The first is an interchange with US 14 at exit 132. This exit is also a signed business spur of I-29. Exit 133 serves the bypass route of US 14, signed as "US 14B". After these exits, the highway continues north toward Watertown.

Before leaving Brookings County and entering Deuel County, I-29 intersects SD 30. About 10 miles (16 km) north of here, the highway serves SD 28. After this interchange, the highway turns northwest en route to Watertown. Early planning of this segment of I-29 had the route passing just east of Kranzburg, or about nine miles (14 km) east of Watertown. A past president of the Watertown Chamber of Commerce contacted Francis Case, a South Dakota Senator, in an effort to get I-29 routed closer to Watertown. The effort was successful; the westward alignment became known locally as the Case Bend. East of Castlewood, I-29 intersects SD 22 before entering Hamlin County. The highway has no exits in Hamlin County, as it travels for only five miles (8.0 km) in the county, merely passing through the northeast corner of it before entering Codington County. The highway curves to the north one mile (1.6 km) before its first exit in Codington County, which is exit 177, serving US 212 in the southeastern portion of Watertown.

I-29 intersects US 81 at exit 180, just northeast of Watertown, and the two routes become concurrent all the way to Manvel, North Dakota. Near the Codington–Grant county line, I-29 intersects SD 20. The highway has one exit in Grant County for Twin Brooks, though this road is not a signed highway. Entering Roberts County, I-29 has an interchange at Summit with US 12, for access to Aberdeen and Milbank. The highway heads northeast after this interchange. West of Wilmot, the highway intersects SD 15. Shortly after this exit, the highway turns to the north again. Just east of Sisseton, I-29 has an interchange with SD 10 then curves northeast. Near the small town of New Effington, the highway curves north and has its last exit in South Dakota at exit 246. This exit serves SD 127. North of this final exit, I-29 turns northeast and enters Richland County, North Dakota, next to the Dakota Magic Casino and Hotel resort. At the state border is a parclo interchange entirely on the North Dakota side serving the casino–hotel.

=== Transit ===
Jefferson Lines provides intercity bus service along the length of I-29 in South Dakota serving five communities along the route with a major transfer point at the Sioux Falls Bus Station.

== History ==
No freeway was originally designated between Sioux Falls and Fargo, North Dakota. In 1957, the segment of I-29 from Fargo to the Canadian border was considered for designation as Interstate 31 (I-31). However, in 1958, it was decided to connect the two Interstates between Sioux Falls and Fargo. The entire freeway from Kansas City, Missouri, to the Canadian border was then built and signed as I-29.

A 19.5-mile (31.4 km) section between Worthing and SD 38 west of Sioux Falls was opened in October 1960. In September 1961, I-29 was extended across the Big Sioux River from Iowa to South Dakota. On April 1, 1962, some of the northbound directional spans collapsed into the Big Sioux River at the Iowa state line as a result of flooding and bridge scour. On September 30, 1962, an 84-mile (135 km) section of I-29 between Sioux City and Sioux Falls was dedicated and opened to traffic.

By 1967, I-29 had been constructed from the Iowa border to the exit for SD 34. I-229, an auxiliary route for the highway bypassing Sioux Falls, was completed in 1962.

An additional interchange in Brookings was opened on August 24, 2023.

== Future ==
By 2033, the South Dakota Department of Transportation (SDDOT) is planning to upgrade the interchange with I-229. SDDOT also plans to install an interchange with 85th Street in Sioux Falls, as well as a 69th Street overpass, turning a trumpet interchange into a redesigned tri-stack interchange.

== Exit list ==
County	Location	mi	km	Exit	Destinations	Notes
Union	Big Sioux Township	0.00	0.00		I-29 south – Sioux City	Continuation into Iowa
Union	Dakota Dunes	0.98	1.58	1	Dakota Dunes	Parclo interchange
Union	North Sioux City	2.48	3.99	2	North Sioux City	Formerly SD 105
Union	North Sioux City	4.35	7.00	4	North Sioux City, McCook Lake	
Union	Jefferson Township	9.50	15.29	9	Jefferson	Formerly SD 105
Union	Elk Point Township	15.78	25.40	15	I-29 BL north – Elk Point	I-29 BL only marked northbound
Union	Elk Point Township	18.30	29.45	18	I-29 BL south – Elk Point, Burbank	Parclo interchange, I-29 BL only marked southbound
Union	Brule Township	26.70	42.97	26	SD 50 – Vermillion, Yankton	Also access to University of South Dakota
Union	Spink Township	31.27	50.32	31	SD 48 east – Spink, Akron IA	Also access to Union Grove State Park
Union	Emmet Township	38.32	61.67	38	Volin	
Union	Prairie Township	42.31	68.09	42	Alcester, Wakonda	
Lincoln	Beresford	47.30	76.12	47	SD 46 – Beresford, Irene	
Lincoln	Pleasant Township	50.31	80.97	50	Centerville, Hudson	
Lincoln	Pleasant–Lincoln township line	53.32	85.81	53	Viborg	
Lincoln	Lincoln Township	56.33	90.65	56	Fairview	Also access to Newton Hills State Park
Lincoln	Lincoln–Lynn township line	59.33	95.48	59	US 18 west – Davis, Hurley	Southern end of US 18 concurrency
Lincoln	Lynn Township	62.35	100.34	62	US 18 east – Canton	Northern end of US 18 concurrency
Lincoln	Lynn Township	64.33	103.53	64	SD 44 – Worthing, Lennox	
Lincoln	La Valley Township	68.35	110.00	68	Lennox, Parker	
Lincoln	Tea	71.36	114.84	71	Harrisburg, Tea	
Lincoln	Tea	73.38	118.09	73	CR 106 – Tea	Single-point urban interchange (SPUI)
Lincoln	Sioux Falls	74.38	119.70	74	85th Street	Future diverging diamond interchange; to begin construction in 2025
Lincoln	Sioux Falls	75.19	121.01	75	I-229 north	Trumpet interchange; I-229 exits 1A-B southbound.
Minnehaha	Sioux Falls	77.26	124.34	77	41st Street	Diverging diamond interchange; Also access to Augustana University, University of Sioux Falls
Minnehaha	Sioux Falls	78.12	125.72	78	26th Street / Louise Avenue	
Minnehaha	Sioux Falls	79.26	127.56	79	12th Street – Downtown	SPUI; Also access to Great Plains Zoo, USS South Dakota Battleship Memorial, Washington Pavilion of Arts and Science
Minnehaha	Sioux Falls	80.29	129.21	80	Madison Street – Sioux Empire Fairgrounds	SPUI
Minnehaha	Sioux Falls	81.32	130.87	81	Russell Street / Maple Street – Denny Sanford PREMIER Center, Sioux Falls Arena and Convention Center	Parclo interchange having three northbound entrances: two from Russell St., one from Maple St; Also access to Sioux Falls Bus Station
Minnehaha	Sioux Falls	82.41	132.63	82	Benson Road – Sioux Falls, Sanford Pentagon/Sports Complex	SPUI
Minnehaha	Sioux Falls	83.38	134.19	83	SD 38 west (60th Street North) – Sioux Falls Regional Airport	Parclo interchange
Minnehaha	Mapleton Township	84.15	135.43	84	I-90 – Albert Lea, Rapid City	Signed as exits 84A (east, Albert Lea) and 84B (west, Rapid City); cloverleaf interchange; I-90 exits 396A-B
Minnehaha	Mapleton Township	86.40	139.05	86	Renner, Crooks	
Minnehaha	Lyons–Burk township line	94.49	152.07	94	Baltic, Colton, Lyons, US Geological Survey/EROS	Colton only signed northbound
Minnehaha	Burk Township	98.47	158.47	98	SD 115 south – Dell Rapids, Chester, Colton	SD 115 and Colton only signed southbound, Chester only signed northbound
Moody	Enterprise Township	104.81	168.68	104	Trent, Chester	Chester only signed southbound
Moody	Egan Township	109.83	176.75	109	SD 34 – Madison, Colman	Also access to Dakota State University, Lake Herman State Park
Moody	Clare Township	114.82	184.78	114	SD 32 east – Flandreau	
Moody	Riverview Township	121.83	196.07	121	Nunda, Ward	
Brookings	Trenton Township	127.80	205.67	127	SD 324 east – Elkton, Sinai	Western terminus of SD 324
Brookings	Brookings	130.79	210.49	130	20th Street South, Brookings	Opened August 24, 2023; Brookings only signed northbound
Brookings	Brookings	132.79	213.70	132	I-29 BS west / US 14 (6th Street) – Brookings, Huron	Eastern terminus of I-29 Business Spur; Also access to South Dakota State University, Municipal Airport; 6th Street only signed southbound
Brookings	Brookings	133.78	215.30	133	US 14 Byp. (18th Street) – Volga, Arlington	Also access to South Dakota State University, De Smet-Home of Laura Ingalls Wilder; 18th Street only signed northbound
Brookings	Afton Township	140.77	226.55	140	SD 30 – White, Bruce	Also access to Oakwood Lakes State Park
Deuel	Blom Township	150.87	242.80	150	SD 15 north / SD 28 – Toronto, Estelline	SD 15 only signed northbound
Deuel	Hidewood Township	157.63	253.68	157	Brandt	
Deuel	Havana Township	164.53	264.79	164	SD 22 – Castlewood, Clear Lake	
Hamlin	No major junctions					
Codington	Watertown	177.93	286.35	177	US 212 – Watertown, Kranzburg	Also access to Redlin Art Center, Lake Area Technical Institute, Mount Marty University-Watertown Campus, Sandy Shore Recreation Area, Pelican Lake Recreation Area
Codington	Elmira Township	180.94	291.19	180	US 81 south – Watertown	Southern end of US 81 concurrency; Also access to Bramble Park Zoo, Municipal Airport, US 81 only signed southbound
Codington	Rauville Township	185.95	299.26	185	Waverly	
Codington	Germantown Township	193.02	310.64	193	SD 20 – South Shore, Stockholm	
Grant	Farmington Township	201.05	323.56	201	Twin Brooks	
Roberts	Summit Township	207.29	333.60	207	US 12 – Aberdeen, Milbank	Also access to Northern State University, Summit, Webster, Blue Dog State Fish Hatchery, Waubay National Wildlife Refuge
Roberts	Spring Grove Township	213.87	344.19	213	SD 15 – Wilmot	Also access to Hartford Beach State Park
Roberts	Agency Township	224.02	360.53	224	Peever	Also access to Sisseton-Wahpeton Oyate Tribal Headquarters and Community College, Pickerel Lake Recreation Area
Roberts	Grant Township	232.07	373.48	232	SD 10 – Sisseton, Browns Valley	Also access to Roy Lake State Park, Fort Sisseton State Park
Roberts	Hart Township	242.02	389.49	242	No name exit	
Roberts	Lien Township	246.42	396.57	246	SD 127 – New Effington, Rosholt	Also access to Sica Hollow State Park
Roberts	Victor Township	252.50	406.36		I-29 north / US 81 north – Fargo	Continuation into North Dakota
1.000 mi = 1.609 km; 1.000 km = 0.621 mi: Concurrency terminus; Proposed

Interstate 29
Previous state: Iowa	South Dakota	Next state: North Dakota
