= South Dakota Highway 100 =

Future highway in South Dakota

Highway 100
- SR 100 corridor highlighted in red

Route information
- Maintained by City of Sioux Falls

Major junctions
- South end: I-29 south of Sioux Falls
- SD 11 in Sioux Falls; SD 11 / SD 42 in Sioux Falls
- North end: I-90 north of Sioux Falls

Location
- Country: United States
- State: South Dakota
- Counties: Lincoln, Minnehaha

Highway system
- South Dakota State Trunk Highway System; Interstate; US; State
← I-90	→ SD 101

South Dakota Highway 100 (SD 100) is the designation of a future state highway that will be built south and east of Interstate 229 (I-229) as a second southeastern bypass of Sioux Falls. The highway will run from exit 73 on I-29 east and north to exit 402 on I-90. This highway is currently named Veterans Parkway on its route from Interstate 90 to 57th Street in Sioux Falls.

== Route description ==
SD 100 is expected to facilitate commercial and residential growth in the eastern section of the city of Sioux Falls. It will also serve as a second eastern bypass of the city, running roughly parallel to I-229 and about 2.5 miles (4.0 km) outside of it.

As proposed, SD 100 will begin at the single-point urban interchange (SPUI) at exit 73 along I-29 east of Tea. After crossing Tallgrass Avenue it will make a short northeast jog before turning east just before crossing Louise Avenue. It will start curving northeast just before meeting Western Avenue. This section from I-29 is anticipated for construction in 2026-2027. Completed in 2023-24 was the section from Western Avenue, going northeast to a pedestrian underpass just west of the intersection with SD 115 (Minnesota Avenue), an overpass of 85th Street and an intersection with Cliff Avenue. The route continues northeast past this intersection until it is midway between 69th and 85th Streets; then the route will curve straight east with a bridge over the BNSF railroad to an intersection with Sycamore Avenue. This segment from Cliff Avenue to Sycamore Avenue was completed in 2025-26. After a short distance SD 100 is to bend to the northeast, where the road will meet SD 11, which will curve on a new alignment into an intersection which 69th Street will also be angled to. Both SD 11 and 100 will run together to the northeast until meeting 57th Street and cross going mainly north from Lincoln County into Minnehaha County. This Segment 4 is anticipated for design completed in summer 2025 and construction in spring 2026-fall 2027.

The Minnehaha County portion to I-90 is complete. After intersecting 57th Street, SD 100 (which is not yet signed) and SD 11 continue north to an intersection with SD 42 (Arrowhead Parkway). At this intersection, SD 11 leaves SD 100 and turns east along SD 42. Veterans Parkway continues north of this intersection until just south of Madison Street, where it curves slightly to the northeast. The highway continues northeast until intersecting a proposed extension of Benson Road at another SPUI. Here, the road turns northwest to intersect Rice Street and go on a bridge over a railroad, then back to the north before bridge crossing another railroad and the Big Sioux River and intersecting 60th Street North. Just north of 60th Street North, Veterans Pkwy. (planned to be SD 100) ends at what was previously a diamond interchange, but was upgraded to a SPUI, at exit 402 on I-90.

== History ==
Planning for a new southeastern bypass of Sioux Falls began in the 1990s, when community members collaborated with officials from the City of Sioux Falls and South Dakota Department of Transportation. Construction of the first segment of Highway 100, extending from just south of South Dakota Highway 42/Arrowhead Parkway southward to 26th Street. The rest of the eastern half of Highway 100, extending from 57th Street northward to Interstate 90, was constructed in phases over ten years. The last segment of this stretch, extending from Rice Street across the Big Sioux River to Interstate 90, opened to traffic in December 2020.

== Major intersections ==
County	Location	mi	km	Destinations	Notes
Lincoln	Tea	0.00	0.00	I-29 – Beresford	Future southern terminus; exit 73 on I-29; single-point urban interchange (SPUI); road to continue west as CR 106 (271st Street)
Lincoln	Sioux Falls			Western Avenue	
Lincoln	Sioux Falls			SD 115 (Minnesota Avenue)	
Lincoln	Sioux Falls			Cliff Avenue	
Lincoln	Sioux Falls			SD 11 south (Powder House Road)	Future southern end of SD 11 concurrency
Minnehaha	Sioux Falls			26th Street	
Minnehaha	Sioux Falls			SD 11 north / SD 42 (Arrowhead Parkway)	Future northern end of SD 11 concurrency
Minnehaha				Rice Street	Temporary northern terminus from 2018 to December 2020.
Minnehaha				I-90 – Brandon, Sioux Falls	Northern terminus; exit 402 on I-90; single-point urban interchange; road continues north as CR 121 (478th Avenue)
1.000 mi = 1.609 km; 1.000 km = 0.621 mi: Concurrency terminus; Unopened
