= South Dakota Highway 105 =

Former state highway in South Dakota, United States

Highway 105
- SD 105 highlighted in red

Route information
- Existed: c. 1980–1998

Major junctions
- South end: I-29 at North Sioux City
- North end: I-29 at Jefferson

Location
- Country: United States
- State: South Dakota

Highway system
- South Dakota State Trunk Highway System; Interstate; US; State

South Dakota Highway 105 (SD 105) was a state highway located entirely in Union County, in the eastern part of the U.S. state of South Dakota. It traveled from Military Road in North Sioux City to Interstate 29 (I-29) in Jefferson. It was an alternate route to I-29.

== Major intersections ==
The entire route was in Union County.

| Location | mi | km | Destinations | Notes |
|---|---|---|---|---|
| North Sioux City | 0.0 | 0.0 | I-29 – Sioux City, Elk Point | exit 2 |
| North Sioux City | 1.0 | 1.6 | Military Way | Former US 77 |
| Jefferson | 8.8 | 14.2 | I-29 – Elk Point, Sioux City | exit 9 |
1.000 mi = 1.609 km; 1.000 km = 0.621 mi
