= List of exits on Interstate 29 =

The Interstate 29 exit list has been divided by state:

- Interstate 29 in Missouri#Exit list
- Interstate 29 in Iowa#Exit list
- Interstate 29 in South Dakota#Exit list
- Interstate 29 in North Dakota#Exit list
