= Business routes of Interstate 29 =

Interstate 29 Business

Location
- Country: United States

Highway system
- Interstate Highway System; Main; Auxiliary; Suffixed; Business; Future

At least five business routes of Interstate 29 (I-29) are known to exist. These business routes provide access from I-29 to adjacent communities.

== Saint Joseph loop ==
Interstate 29 Business
- Location: Saint Joseph, Missouri

Interstate 29 Business Loop (I-29 BL) is a business loop of I-29 in Saint Joseph, Missouri. It begins at a diamond interchange with exit 44 (U.S. Route 169 [US 169]), and heads northwest, overlapping that route. After a bridge over a former Chicago, Burlington and Quincy Railroad line (now Burlington Northern and Santa Fe), I-29 BL has an intersection with Pear Street, where it turns straight west. Pear Street ends at the intersections of Easton Road and Garfield Avenue, and I-29 BL moves northwest onto Garfield Avenue, along the northeast side of the same CB&Q line it crossed over when it overlapped US 169. One block away from an intersection with 11th Street across the tracks from the LifeLine Foods factory, northbound I-29 BL moves onto 10th Street, while southbound I-29 BL runs along 9th Street. Both streets have partial interchanges with US 36. Southbound 9th Street has onramps to US 36, while northbound 10th Street has offramps from US 36. Through the more formerly industrious downtown St. Joseph, between Mitchell Avenue and Penn Street, both 9th and 10th streets run on the sides of the Pony Express National Museum. This one-way pair terminates on Frederick Avenue at the intersection of Francis and Jules streets, while the I-29 BL turns on to Frederick Avenue heading northeast. The road turns east at Highly Street near North 25th Street at the Dr. Jacob Geiger House-Maud Wyeth Painter House. Along the way, it passes the Molina Golf Course and runs between the Northwest Missouri Psychiatric Rehabilitation Center and the Glore Psychiatric Museum. I-29 BL encounters US 169, for a second time, as well as the western terminus of Route 6. I-29 BL then turns toward the north, overlapping US 169 (Belt Highway). At Rochester Road, US 169 ends its concurrency and heads northeasterly while I-29 BL continues northward with Belt Highway. Two miles (3.2 km) later, US 59 joins the business loop and Belt Highway. I-29 BL finally ends at exit 53 on I-29, another diamond interchange, and US 59 continues north.

== North Sioux City spur ==
Interstate 29 Business
- Location: North Sioux City, South Dakota

Interstate 29 Business is an existing but unsigned business spur of I-29 in North Sioux City, South Dakota. It runs from a diamond interchange at exit 2, east along River Road to Military Road (former US 77 and Highway 105 (SD 105)).

== Elk Point loop ==
Interstate 29 Business
- Location: Elk Point, South Dakota

Interstate 29 Business is a business loop of I-29 in Elk Point, South Dakota. It runs for 2.679 miles (4.311 km) between exits 15 and 18 along a former segment of US 77.

== Sioux Falls spur ==
Interstate 29 Downtown Spur
- Location: Sioux Falls, South Dakota

Interstate 29 Downtown (I-29 Dwtn.) is a locally maintained business spur of I-29 in Sioux Falls, South Dakota. It runs east from a SPUI interchange at exit 79 and is overlapped by SD 42 on 12th Street as it crosses a bridge over the Big Sioux River. This section runs through the Emerson section of Sioux Falls, and, after the intersection with South Grange Avenue, it enters the Folsom's Addition neighborhood, where it curves to the northeast and becomes a oneway pair east of Menlo Avenue. From that point, eastbound I-29 Dwtn./SD 42 run on 11th Street, while westbound the two routes run on 10th Street. I-29 Dwtn. finally terminates at SD 115 (North Minnesota Avenue) on the border between Folsom's Addition and Downtown Sioux Falls. Both routes encounter I-229 Dwtn., which turns from its overlap with SD 115 onto SD 42.

== Brookings spur ==
Interstate 29 Business
- Location: Brookings, South Dakota

Interstate 29 Business is a Business Spur of I-29 in Brookings, South Dakota. It runs west from a diamond interchange at exit 132 and is overlapped by US 14 on 6th Street.

== See also ==
- Special routes of U.S. Route 81
- Interstate 229 (South Dakota) § Downtown Loop
