= South Dakota Highway 115 =

State highway in South Dakota, United States

Highway 115

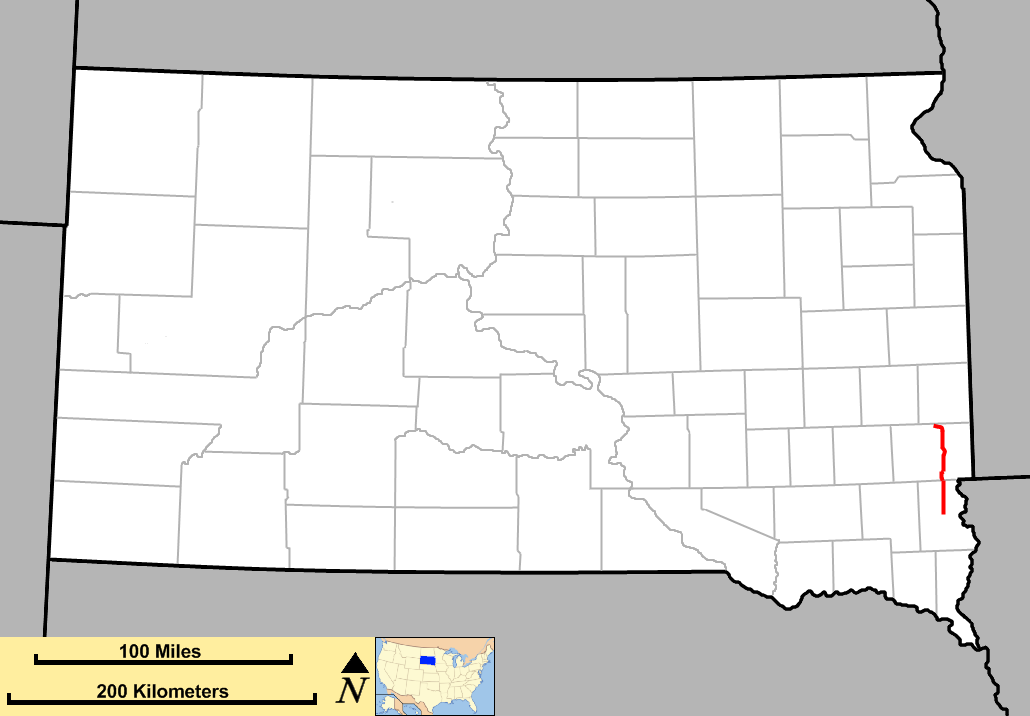
- Route of SD 115 (in red)

Route information
- Maintained by SDDOT
- Length: 40 mi (64 km)
- Existed: 1980–present

Major junctions
- South end: US 18 west of Canton
- I-229 / I-229 Dwtn. in Sioux Falls; I-29 Dwtn. in Sioux Falls; I-90 in Sioux Falls
- North end: I-29 west of Dell Rapids

Location
- Country: United States
- State: South Dakota
- Counties: Lincoln; Minnehaha

Highway system
- South Dakota State Trunk Highway System; Interstate; US; State
← SD 109	→ SD 123

South Dakota Highway 115 (SD 115) is a 40-mile (64 km) state highway in Lincoln and Minnehaha counties in South Dakota, United States, that was created from the routing of US 77, "Old 77", when its alignment was moved west to become Interstate 29 around 1980 and SD 15's route from US 18 to Sioux Falls. SD 115 routes from its intersection with US 18 about 13 miles (21 km) south of Sioux Falls to Interstate 29 three miles west of Dell Rapids. It is about 40.5 miles (65.2 km) in length.

SD 115 was designated a POW/MIA Memorial Highway in 2000. The segment south of Sioux Falls to US 18 was originally designated part of the Custer Battlefield Highway when it was designated SD 15.

== Route description ==
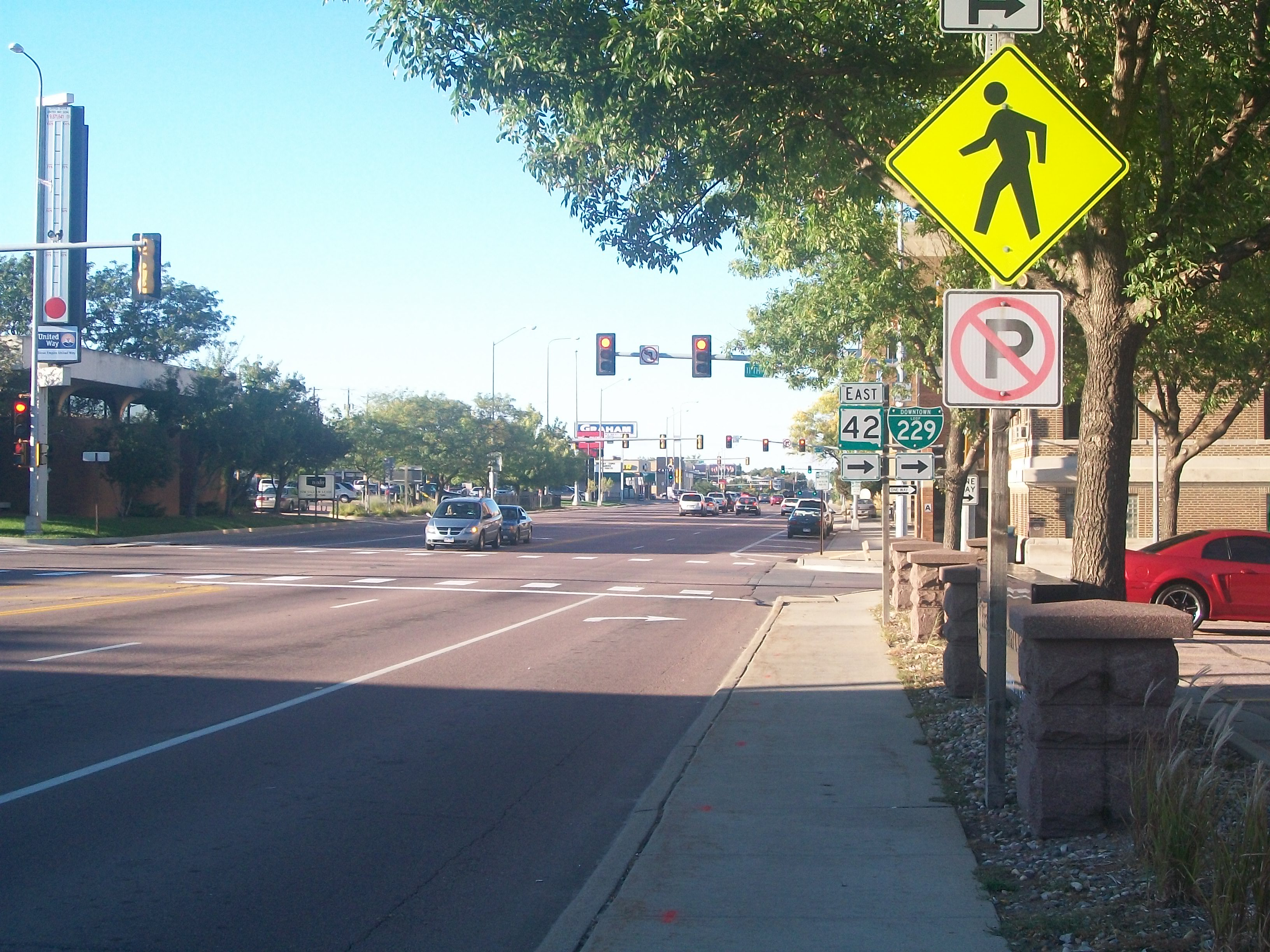
SD 115 northbound intersects SD 42 eastbound in Sioux Falls, September 2013

South Dakota Highway 115 begins at an intersection with US 18 west of Canton and heads due north through rural Lincoln County. The highway runs just east of Worthing and about a mile west of Harrisburg, South Dakota. Three miles north of the Harrisburg intersection, SD 115 intersects 85th Street and enters Sioux Falls from the south. It runs along Minnesota Avenue in the southern portion of Sioux Falls and enters Minnehaha County upon crossing 57th Street. Just south of 41st Street, SD 115 meets Interstate 229. SD 115 travels farther north through the downtown section of Sioux Falls, meeting SD 42 eastbound at 11th Street and westbound at 10th Street. North of downtown Sioux Falls, the route turns east on Benson Road, then north again on Cliff Avenue. It then meets Interstate 90 just before exiting Sioux Falls.

North of Sioux Falls, SD 115 travels through rural, sparsely populated areas of Minnehaha County. It passes through Renner and east of Baltic before entering Dell Rapids. In Dell Rapids, the highway turns west at 4th Street and travels about three miles west to its terminus at Interstate 29.

== Major intersections ==
County	Location	mi	km	Destinations	Notes
Lincoln		0.000	0.000	CR 121 south / US 18 – Canton	Southern terminus; road continues as CR 121 (unpaved)
Minnehaha	Sioux Falls			I-229 Dwtn. begins / I-229	I-229 Exit 3; southern terminus of I-229 Dwtn.; southern end of I-229 Dwtn. concurrency
Minnehaha	Sioux Falls			I-229 Dwtn. (11th Street east) / I-29 Dwtn.	One-way street, inbound access only from I-29 Dwtn.; eastern terminus of I-29 Dwtn. EB
Minnehaha	Sioux Falls			I-29 Dwtn. (10th Street west) / I-229 Dwtn. (10th Street)	One-way street, outbound access only to I-29 Dwtn.; northern end of I-229 Dwtn. concurrency; eastern terminus of I-29 Dwtn. WB
Minnehaha	Sioux Falls			I-90 – Mitchell, Brandon, Luverne MN	I-90 exit 399
Minnehaha		40	64	I-29 – Brookings, Sioux Falls	Northern terminus; I-29 exit 98; road continues west as 246th Street
1.000 mi = 1.609 km; 1.000 km = 0.621 mi: Concurrency terminus

== See also ==
- List of state highways in South Dakota
