= Plug-in electric vehicles in South Dakota =

As of September 2022, there were 1,429 electric vehicles in South Dakota, equivalent to 0.12% of all vehicles in the state.

== Government policy ==
As of April 2022, South Dakota does not offer any tax incentives for electric vehicle purchases.

== Charging stations ==
As of April 2022, there were 57 public charging stations in South Dakota.

As of 2022, the state recognizes I-29, I-90, I-229, and I-190 as "alternative fuel corridors" with plans for charging stations every 50 miles (80 km).

== By region ==
=== Rapid City ===
As of January 2022, there were 10 public charging stations in Rapid City.

=== Sioux Falls ===
The first electric vehicle was added to the Sioux Falls city fleet in early 2022.
