= Tollefson =

Tollefson is the Americanized spelling of the Norwegian "Tollefsen".

Tollefson is a surname shared by the following people:

- Carrie Tollefson, an American middle-distance runner
- Chuck Tollefson, a former American football player for the Green Bay Packers
- Dave Tollefson, an American football player for the New York Giants
- Thor C. Tollefson, a US Representative from Washington
- Sean Tollefson, a singer/songwriter for the indie band Tullycraft
