= Interstate 29 =

Interstate Highway from Kansas City to Canada

Interstate 29
- I-29 highlighted in red

Route information
- Length: 750.80 mi (1,208.30 km)
- Existed: August 14, 1957–present
- NHS: Entire route

Major junctions
- South end: I-35 / I-70 / US 24 / US 40 / US 71 in Kansas City, MO
- I-35 in Kansas City, MO; I-635 in Kansas City, MO; I-435 from Ferrelview, MO to Platte City, MO; I-229 in St. Joseph, MO; I-80 in Council Bluffs, IA; I-680 near Crescent, IA; I-880 near Missouri Valley, IA; I-90 near Sioux Falls, SD; I-94 / US 52 in Fargo, ND
- North end: PTH 75 at the Pembina–Emerson Border Crossing near Pembina, ND

Location
- Country: United States
- States: Missouri, Iowa, South Dakota, North Dakota

Highway system
- Interstate Highway System; Main; Auxiliary; Suffixed; Business; Future

Interstate 29 (I-29) is an Interstate Highway in the Midwestern United States. I-29 runs from Kansas City, Missouri, at a junction with I-35 and I-70, to the Canada–United States border near Pembina, North Dakota, where it connects with Manitoba Provincial Trunk Highway 75 (PTH 75), which continues on to Winnipeg, Manitoba. The road follows the course of three major rivers, all of which form the borders of US states. The southern portion of I-29 closely parallels the Missouri River from Kansas City northward to Sioux City, Iowa, where it crosses and then parallels the Big Sioux River. For the northern third of the highway, it closely follows the Red River of the North. The major cities that I-29 connects to includes (from south to north) St. Joseph, Missouri; Council Bluffs, Iowa; Sioux City, Iowa; Sioux Falls, South Dakota; Fargo, North Dakota; and Grand Forks, North Dakota. I-29 also serves as a road connection between the four largest public universities in the Dakotas: the University of North Dakota, North Dakota State University, the University of South Dakota, and South Dakota State University.

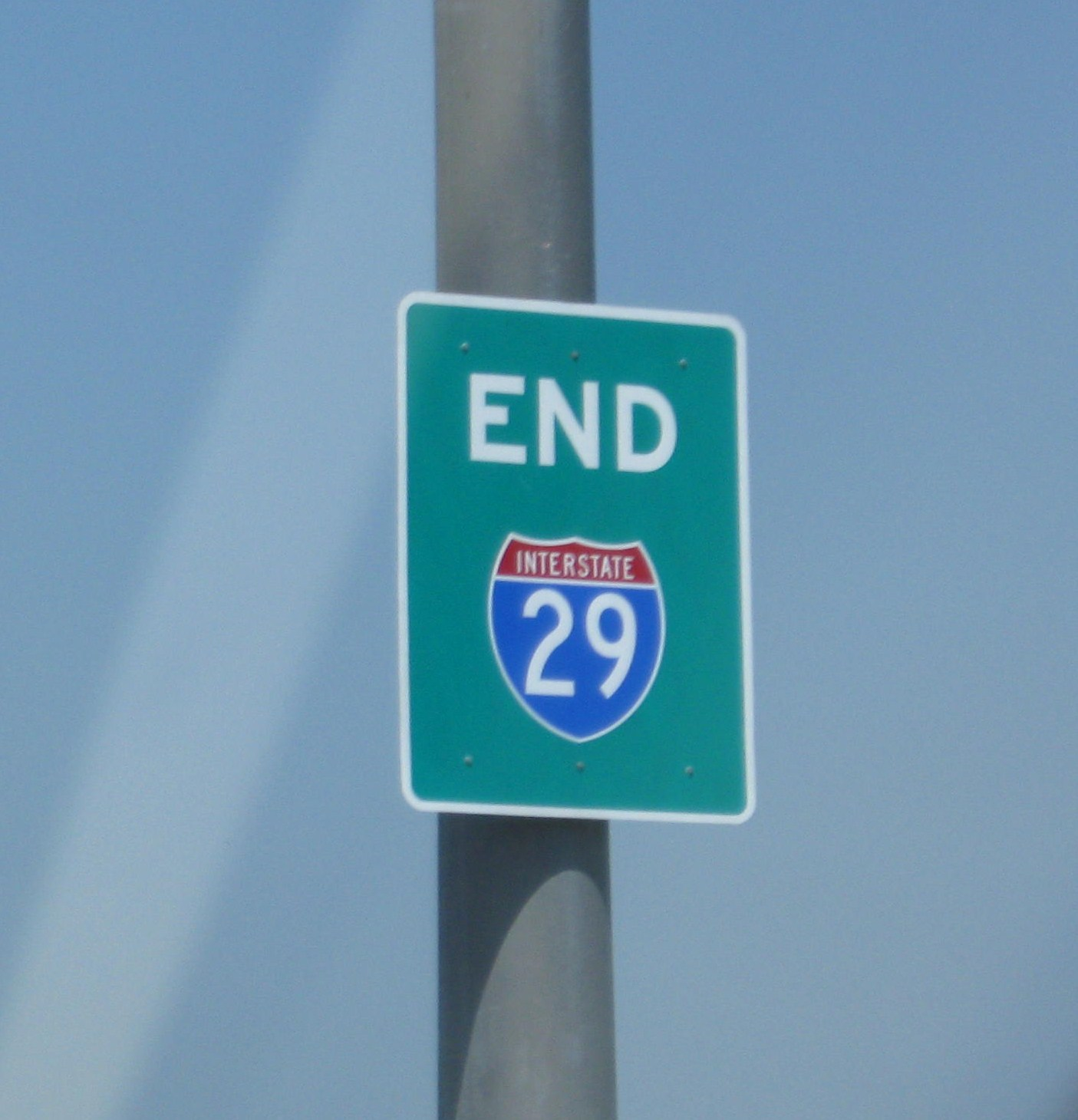
The I-29 "END" shield at its southern terminus in Kansas City.

== Route description ==
Lengths
	mi	km
MO	128.71	207.14
IA	151.83	244.35
SD	252.50	406.36
ND	217.54	350.10
Total	750.58	1,207.94

=== Missouri ===
Near its southern terminus, I-29 is concurrent with I-35 and U.S. Route 71 (US 71). The Interstate diverts from US 71 just north of St. Joseph and follows a sparsely populated corridor along the Missouri River to Council Bluffs. During the design phase there was an alternative sending the route further along US 71 through the bigger towns of Maryville, Missouri, and Clarinda, Iowa. During the Great Flood of 1993, the Missouri River flooded this section and traffic was rerouted to US 71 through Maryville and Clarinda. I-29 was closed again for about two months during the 2011 Missouri River Flood.

Almost all of I-29 in Missouri is in an area called the Platte Purchase that was not originally part of Missouri when it entered the Union.

=== Iowa ===
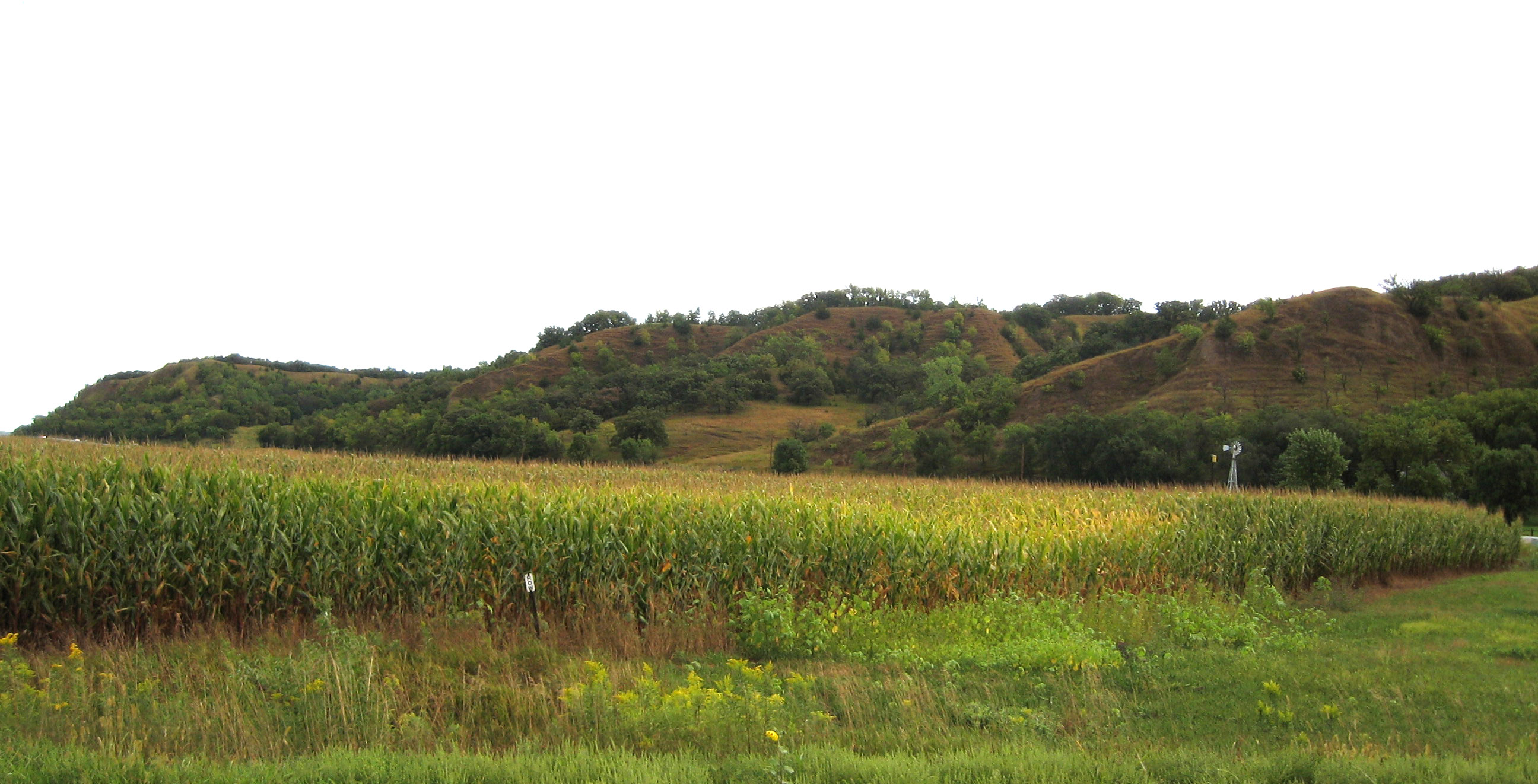
The Loess Hills flank I-29 to the east in Iowa

I-29 begins in Iowa near Hamburg. It goes northwest to an interchange with Iowa Highway 2 (Iowa 2), then goes north until Council Bluffs. It appears to briefly runs concurrent with I-80, but I-29 actually runs outside I-80 until the two separate less than one mile (1.6 km) east of Omaha, Nebraska, to follow the Missouri River north, winding its way along the western and northern edges of Council Bluffs. North of Council Bluffs, I-29 intersects I-680 at exit 61. At exit 71, I-880 begins, while I-29 continues on a northwesterly path toward Sioux City. At Sioux City, I-129 spurs off of I-29 to go west toward South Sioux City, Nebraska. After continuing toward downtown Sioux City on a northerly route, I-29 turns west and enters South Dakota.

All of I-29 through Iowa is part of the Lewis and Clark Trail.

=== South Dakota ===
I-29 enters South Dakota at North Sioux City by crossing over the Big Sioux River. It runs northwest until its interchange with Highway 50 (SD 50) near Vermillion, where it turns north. The highway alignment is due north until just before Sioux Falls. In the Sioux Falls area, I-29 serves the western part of Sioux Falls while I-229 spurs off and serves eastern Sioux Falls. In northwestern Sioux Falls, I-29 meets I-90. After that, it continues north past Brookings and an intersection with US 14. At the intersection with SD 28, I-29 turns northwest toward Watertown. After Watertown, the highway continues north and passes an intersection with US 12 before continuing into North Dakota.

=== North Dakota ===
I-29 enters North Dakota from the south near Hankinson. At Fargo, it meets I-94/US 52 and continues north along the Red River toward Grand Forks. At its northern terminus, I-29 enters Canada and becomes PTH 75 in Manitoba, which leads to Winnipeg.

== History ==
Interstate 31
- Location: Fargo, North Dakota, to Canada–US border
- Length: 152 mi (245 km)
- Existed: 1957–1958

=== Interstate 31 ===
The portion from Fargo, North Dakota, to the Canada–US border was originally considered for designation as Interstate 31 (I-31) in 1957 for present-day I-29. The highway was about 152 mi (244.62 km). No freeway was initially planned south of Fargo. However, it was subsequently decided in 1958 to connect I-29 and I-31 between Sioux Falls and Fargo. The entire freeway was then built and numbered as I-29.

=== Interstate 49 ===
Residents of Missouri, Arkansas, and Louisiana began campaigning in the 1960s to extend I-29 via the US 71 corridor from Kansas City, Missouri, to New Orleans, Louisiana. The campaign would create a limited access highway from New Orleans to Canada and on to Winnipeg. That extension came to be designated as I-49, which was not part of the 1957 master plan. It was assigned a separate number instead of I-29 to conform with the numbering rules for Interstate Highways (increasing from west to east for north–south routes), as it would lie east of I-35 and west of I-55. When I-49 is complete, the goal of the association will have been accomplished, with only a brief gap (served by other Interstates or US 71).

=== 2019 closures ===
In March and April 2019, as a result of the 2019 Midwestern US floods, I-29 was closed in both directions for approximately 187 miles (301 km) between St. Joseph and Council Bluffs. Much of this section of I-29, including at the Missouri–Iowa border, runs over or through a large floodplain for the Missouri and Platte rivers. As such, multiple elevated sections of the highway collapsed and other sections were submerged or washed out by floodwaters. This was the largest closure of an Interstate Highway in terms of distance in the history of the Interstate Highway System. A signed detour was not officially designated in most areas, as the roads that would be used as detours are mostly rural farm roads that were also submerged by flooding. However, along I-80 in Iowa, traffic from I-80 in Iowa was officially detoured via I-35 from Des Moines, Iowa, to Kansas City, Missouri. US 75, paralleling I-29 on the other side of the Missouri River, was also closed in large sections due to flooding.

By May 2019, the vast majority of I-29 had been repaired and reopened, with the exception of 10 miles (16 km) around Council Bluffs where the highway ran concurrent with I-680 (now the portion of I-29 between I-680 and I-880). However, throughout the remainder of the spring and summer, and even early fall, more rainfall and flooding resulted in sections of I-29 being closed again, including on the recently repaired sections. At a few times, the entire 187-mile (301 km) section between St. Joseph and Council Bluffs was completely shut down, although this was rare after May 2019.

As of October 2019, all of I-29 is open to traffic in both directions, although some Missouri River bridges and local farm roads remain closed due to flooding.

== Junction list ==
Missouri
I-35 / I-70 / US 24 / US 40 / US 71 at the Downtown Loop in Kansas City. I-29 / I-35 travel concurrently through Kansas City. I-29 / US 71 travel concurrently to east of Amazonia.
US 69 on the Gladstone–Kansas City city line
US 169 on the Gladstone–Kansas City city line
I-635 in Kansas City
I-435 in Kansas City. The highways travel concurrently to Platte City.
I-229 south-southeast of St. Joseph
US 169 in St. Joseph
US 36 in St. Joseph
US 169 in St. Joseph
US 59 / I-29 BL north-northeast of St. Joseph. I-29 / US 59 travel concurrently to east of Amazonia.
I-229 / US 59 / US 71 north of St. Joseph
US 59 northwest of Amazonia. The highways travel concurrently for approximately 1.8 miles (2.9 km).
US 59 north of Oregon
US 159 south-southeast of Mound City
US 59 east of Craig
US 136 in Rock Port
Iowa
US 34 / US 275 west of Glenwood. I-29 / US 275 travel concurrently to Council Bluffs.
I-80 / US 6 in Council Bluffs. I-29 / US 6 travel concurrently through Council Bluffs.
I-480 in Council Bluffs
I-680 west-southwest of Crescent
I-880 west-southwest of Loveland
US 30 in Missouri Valley
I-129 / US 20 / US 75 in Sioux City
US 77 in Sioux City
South Dakota
I-29 BS in North Sioux City
I-29 BL in Elk Point
US 18 south-southwest of Worthing. The highways travel concurrently for approximately 3.02 miles (4.86 km).
I-229 in Sioux Falls
I-29 BS in Sioux Falls
I-90 in Sioux Falls
US 14 / I-29 BS in Brookings
US 212 in Watertown
US 81 northeast of Watertown. The highways travel concurrently to east of Manvel, North Dakota.
US 12 northwest of Summit
North Dakota
I-94 / US 52 in Fargo
US 10 / I-94 BL in Fargo
US 2 in Grand Forks
US 81 south-southwest of Joliette. The highways travel concurrently to the Canada–United States border north of Pembina.
PTH 75 at the Canada–United States border north of Pembina

== Auxiliary routes ==
- St. Joseph, Missouri: I-229
- Sioux City, Iowa: I-129
- Sioux Falls, South Dakota: I-229

== See also ==
- Business routes of Interstate 29
