= List of Interstate Highways in South Dakota =

Interstate Highways in South Dakota
- Standard South Dakota highway shields
- Interstate Highways highlighted in red

System information
- Notes: South Dakota highways are generally state-maintained.

Highway names
- Interstates: Interstate X (I-X)
- US Highways: U.S. Highway X (US X)
- State: (State) Highway X (SD X)

System links
- South Dakota State Trunk Highway System; Interstate; US; State

The Interstate Highways in South Dakota are the segments of the Dwight D. Eisenhower National System of Interstate and Defense Highways owned and maintained by the South Dakota Department of Transportation in the US state of South Dakota.

== Mainline highways ==
Number	Length (mi)	Length (km)	Southern or western terminus	Northern or eastern terminus	Formed	Removed	Notes
I-29	252.50	406.36	I-29 at the Iowa state line at Dakota Dunes	I-29 / US 81 at the North Dakota state line north-northwest of Victor	1958	current	
I-90	412.76	664.27	I-90 at the Wyoming state line west-northwest of North Spearfish	I-90 at the Minnesota state line north-northeast of Valley Springs	—	—	
I-190	1.72	2.77	US 16 / SD 44 / West Boulevard in Rapid City	I-90 / US 14 / US 16 / SD 79 in Rapid City	1962	current	
I-229	11.33	18.23	I-29 in Sioux Falls	I-90 / CR 125 north of Sioux Falls	1966	current	

== Business routes ==
Number	Length (mi)	Length (km)	Southern or western terminus	Northern or eastern terminus	Formed	Removed	Notes
I-29 BL	—	—	—	—	—	—	Serves Elk Point
I-29 BS	—	—	—	—	—	—	Serves Sioux Falls
I-29 BS	—	—	—	—	—	—	Serves Brookings
I-90 BL	—	—	—	—	—	—	Serves Spearfish
I-90 BL	—	—	—	—	—	—	Serves Sturgis
I-90 BL	—	—	—	—	—	—	Serves Rapid City
I-90 BL	—	—	—	—	—	—	Serves Wall
I-90 BL	—	—	—	—	—	—	Serves Kadoka
I-90 BL	—	—	—	—	—	—	Serves Murdo
I-90 BL	—	—	—	—	—	—	Serves Presho
I-90 BL	—	—	—	—	—	—	Serves Chamberlain
I-90 BL	—	—	—	—	—	—	Serves Mitchell
I-90 BS	—	—	—	—	—	—	Serves Sioux Falls
I-229 Dwtn.	—	—	—	—	—	—	Serves Sioux Falls
