= Victor, South Dakota =

Unincorporated community in South Dakota, U.S.

Coordinates: 45°52′08″N 96°49′58″W

Victor is an unincorporated community in Roberts County, in the U.S. state of South Dakota.

== History ==
Victor was laid out in 1913, and named after Victor Township, in which it is located. A post office called Victor was established in 1913 and remained in operation until 1955.
