= Jefferson, South Dakota =

- City
- Location in Union County and the state of South Dakota
- Coordinates: 42°36′15″N 96°33′58″W
- Country: United States
- State: South Dakota
- County: Union
- Incorporated: 1895

Area
  - Total: 0.51 sq mi (1.32 km^{2})
  - Land: 0.51 sq mi (1.32 km^{2})
  - Water: 0 sq mi (0.00 km^{2})
- Elevation: 1,116 ft (340 m)

Population (2020)
  - Total: 475
  - Density: 930.5/sq mi (359.27/km^{2})
- Time zone: UTC-6 (Central (CST))
  - Summer (DST): UTC-5 (CDT)
- ZIP code: 57038
- Area code: 605
- FIPS code: 46-32700
- GNIS feature ID: 1267441
- Website: www.jeffersonsd.com

Jefferson is a city in Union County, South Dakota, United States. The population was 475 at the 2020 census. It is part of the Sioux City, IA-NE-SD Metropolitan Statistical Area. Jefferson was founded in 1859. Every year the citizens of Jefferson and surrounding area celebrate the founding of Jefferson during "Jefferson Days", a festival that includes a movie in the park, a car show, fireworks and parade.

The city has the name of President Thomas Jefferson.

== History ==
Jefferson was primarily settled by French-Canadians. By 1867 the town consisted of 25 or so French-Canadian families. During the winter of 1880–1, the town was ravaged by a smallpox epidemic, reported to have arrived in the area via Russian Mennonite emigrants en route to Yankton, in the Dakota Territory. The town was quarantined for several weeks, without railroad service or mail delivery. At least 150 cases of "black small pox" were reported by February 1881, resulting in more than 82 deaths.

== Geography ==
According to the United States Census Bureau, the city has a total area of 0.50 square miles (1.29 km^{2}), all land.

The closest bodies of water are Horseshoe Lake, a small oxbow lake formed from the nearby river; McCook Lake, the Big Sioux River and the Missouri River.

== Demographics ==
Historical population
Census	Pop.	Note	%±
1880	90		—
1890	229		154.4%
1900	364		59.0%
1910	407		11.8%
1920	550		35.1%
1930	426		−22.5%
1940	469		10.1%
1950	466		−0.6%
1960	443		−4.9%
1970	474		7.0%
1980	592		24.9%
1990	527		−11.0%
2000	586		11.2%
2010	547		−6.7%
2020	475		−13.2%
U.S. Decennial Census

=== 2020 census ===
As of the 2020 census, Jefferson had a population of 475. The median age was 42.6 years. 18.9% of residents were under the age of 18 and 21.3% of residents were 65 years of age or older. For every 100 females there were 120.9 males, and for every 100 females age 18 and over there were 116.3 males age 18 and over. The Census Bureau considers all of Jefferson to be a rural area.

There were 216 households in Jefferson, of which 24.1% had children under the age of 18 living in them. Of all households, 46.3% were married-couple households, 25.5% were households with a male householder and no spouse or partner present, and 16.7% were households with a female householder and no spouse or partner present. About 35.2% of all households were made up of individuals and 10.2% had someone living alone who was 65 years of age or older.

There were 242 housing units, of which 10.7% were vacant. The homeowner vacancy rate was 1.1% and the rental vacancy rate was 15.2%.

Racial composition as of the 2020 census
Race	Number	Percent
White	445	93.7%
Black or African American	3	0.6%
American Indian and Alaska Native	0	0.0%
Asian	1	0.2%
Native Hawaiian and Other Pacific Islander	0	0.0%
Some other race	10	2.1%
Two or more races	16	3.4%
Hispanic or Latino (of any race)	13	2.7%

=== 2010 census ===
As of the census of 2010, there were 547 people, 233 households, and 146 families residing in the city. The population density was 1,094.0 inhabitants per square mile (422.4/km^{2}). There were 248 housing units at an average density of 496.0 per square mile (191.5/km^{2}). The racial makeup of the city was 97.4% White, 0.5% African American, 0.2% Native American, 0.2% from other races, and 1.6% from two or more races. Hispanic or Latino of any race were 1.5% of the population.

There were 233 households, of which 28.8% had children under the age of 18 living with them, 50.2% were married couples living together, 9.0% had a female householder with no husband present, 3.4% had a male householder with no wife present, and 37.3% were non-families. 29.6% of all households were made up of individuals, and 12.9% had someone living alone who was 65 years of age or older. The average household size was 2.35 and the average family size was 2.94.

The median age in the city was 39.2 years. 23% of residents were under the age of 18; 8.3% were between the ages of 18 and 24; 27.3% were from 25 to 44; 28.4% were from 45 to 64; and 13% were 65 years of age or older. The gender makeup of the city was 49.9% male and 50.1% female.

=== 2000 census ===
As of the census of 2000, there were 586 people, 228 households, and 160 families residing in the city. The population density was 2,028.2 inhabitants per square mile (783.1/km^{2}). There were 240 housing units at an average density of 830.7 per square mile (320.7/km^{2}). The racial makeup of the city was 96.59% White, 0.85% African American, 1.02% Native American, 0.17% Asian, and 1.37% from two or more races. Hispanic or Latino of any race were 1.88% of the population.

There were 228 households, out of which 38.6% had children under the age of 18 living with them, 61.4% were married couples living together, 6.6% had a female householder with no husband present, and 29.8% were non-families. 25.9% of all households were made up of individuals, and 10.1% had someone living alone who was 65 years of age or older. The average household size was 2.57 and the average family size was 3.13.

In the city, the population was spread out, with 29.7% under the age of 18, 6.8% from 18 to 24, 30.2% from 25 to 44, 22.0% from 45 to 64, and 11.3% who were 65 years of age or older. The median age was 33 years. For every 100 females, there were 103.5 males. For every 100 females age 18 and over, there were 99.0 males.

The median income for a household in the city was $47,625, and the median income for a family was $52,813. Males had a median income of $34,750 versus $23,750 for females. The per capita income for the city was $18,467. About 1.3% of families and 3.7% of the population were below the poverty line, including 4.0% of those under age 18 and 3.9% of those age 65 or over.
