= Chuck Tollefson =

American football player (1917–1989)

- Chuck Tollefson entering his senior season at Iowa in 1940

No. 27 (college), 46 (Pro)
- Position: Guard

Personal information
- Born: February 28, 1917; Elk Point, South Dakota, U.S.
- Died: August 20, 1989 (aged 72); Green Bay, Wisconsin, U.S.
- Listed height: 6 ft 0 in (1.83 m)
- Listed weight: 215 lb (98 kg)

Career information
- High school: Elk Point (SD)
- College: Iowa
- NFL draft: 1944: undrafted

Career history
- Green Bay Packers (1944–1946)

Awards and highlights
- NFL champion (1944)

Career NFL statistics
- Games played: 18
- Stats at Pro Football Reference

Charles William Tollefson (February 28, 1917 – August 20, 1989) was an American football player who played collegiately for the Iowa Hawkeyes from 1938 to 1940 and professionally for the Green Bay Packers from 1944 to 1946. While he was on the team, the Green Bay Packers won the National Football League championship in 1944. During World War II, Tollefson served in the United States Marine Corps. A dispute about his pay after he was fired by the Packers resulted in a court decision important to professional athletic contracts in the United States.

== Biography ==
=== Early life ===
Charles Tollefson, known by the nickname "Chuck," was born in Elk Point, South Dakota on February 28, 1917, and attended Elk Point High School. Due to the Great Depression, Tollefson was homeless before attending the University of Iowa.

=== University of Iowa ===
Iowa halfback Neal Kinnick breaks through the line, pursued by left guard Chuck Tollefson (#27) in a September 1939 game against South Dakota.

Tollefson first made his way to the University of Iowa campus in Iowa City in 1935, playing briefly on the Iowa Hawkeyes football team as a reserve guard during the 1935 season. He dropped out after the 1935–36 academic year, however, failing to return for the 1936–37 year. In June 1938, Tollefson returned to Iowa City, attending summer school to become qualified to play football that fall.

Tollefson played football for Iowa during the 1938, 1939 and 1940 seasons, a period which included the famous 1939 Hawkeye team that finished the season with a 6–1–1 record and a #9 ranking in the final 1939 Associated Press college football poll.

The 1939 Iowa team, nicknamed "The Ironmen," was led by halfback Nile Kinnick, who won the Heisman Trophy that year. Tollefson, known as "Tolly" by his teammates, was injured in the final game of the season, a 7–7 tie against the Northwestern Wildcats.

A versatile player who saw practice time at all three line positions, Tollefson achieved national recognition in the 1940 season.

=== World War II ===
During World War II, he served in the United States Marine Corps.

=== Green Bay Packers ===
Tollefson was part of the 1944 Green Bay Packers team that won the NFL Championship, defeating the New York Giants 14–7.

Tollefson was released by the Green Bay Packers after the first two regular games of the 1946 season. Although his contract included an added provision providing a "minimum $3,600 for season" in the handwriting of Curly Lambeau, the team's general manager and head coach, the Packers only paid Tollefson a pro-rated $900 of the amount promised. Tollefson sued the team for the $2,700 difference owed on the contract, but initially lost his case in trial court.

Tollefson appealed this decision to the Wisconsin Supreme Court, which in 1950 overturned the lower court's ruling and remanded the case for a new trial, declaring "We conclude that the minimum clause must be construed to mean that, unless discharged for cause, plaintiff was entitled to the full sum of $3,600 whether he participated in the games played or not."

The Wisconsin Supreme Court later cited its decision in the Tollefson case as precedent in a 1956 lawsuit by another professional football player, Clyde Johnson, against the Packers, this time affirming a lower court's ruling in favor of Johnson.

=== Death and legacy ===
Tollefson died in Green Bay, Wisconsin on August 20, 1989.
