= Crooks, South Dakota =

- City
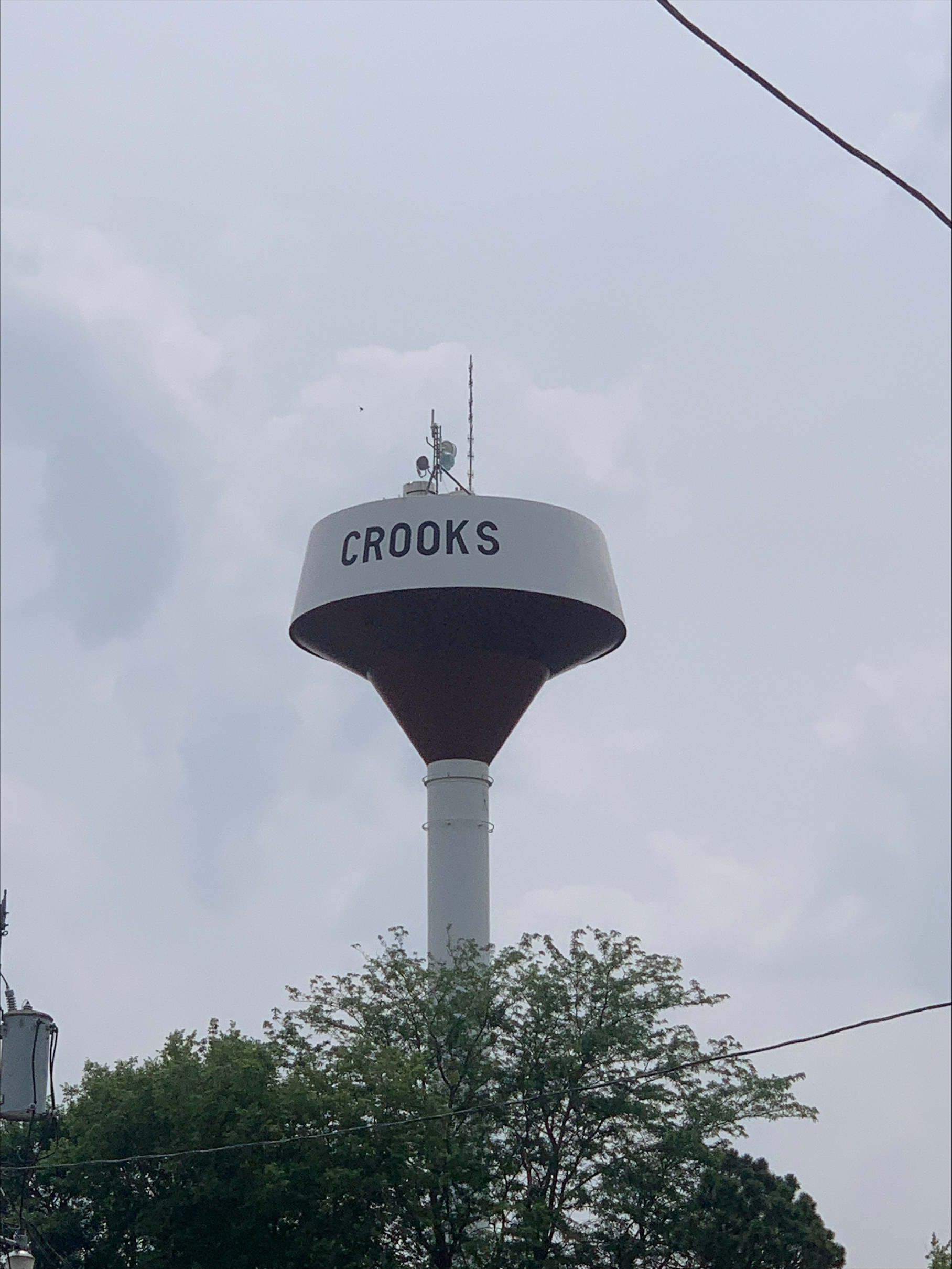
- Water tower in Crooks, South Dakota

- Icon

- Location in Minnehaha County and the state of South Dakota
- Coordinates: 43°39′33″N 96°48′34″W
- Country: United States
- State: South Dakota
- County: Minnehaha

Government
  - Mayor: F. Butch Oseby

Area
  - Total: 0.81 sq mi (2.09 km^{2})
  - Land: 0.81 sq mi (2.09 km^{2})
  - Water: 0 sq mi (0.00 km^{2})
- Elevation: 1,595 ft (486 m)

Population (2020)
  - Total: 1,362
  - Density: 1,692/sq mi (653.1/km^{2})
- Time zone: UTC−6 (Central (CST))
  - Summer (DST): UTC−5 (CDT)
- ZIP code: 57020
- Area code: 605
- FIPS code: 46-14740
- GNIS feature ID: 1267341
- Website: www.crookssd.gov

Crooks is a city in Minnehaha County, South Dakota, United States and is a suburb of Sioux Falls. The population was 1,268 at the 2024 census. Crooks was named New Hope until 1904. The town's present name honors W. A. Crooks, a local politician.

== Geography ==
According to the United States Census Bureau, the city has a total area of 1.3 square miles.

== Demographics ==
Historical population
Census	Pop.	Note	%±
1980	594		—
1990	671		13.0%
2000	859		28.0%
2010	1,269		47.7%
2020	1,362		7.3%
U.S. Decennial Census

=== 2024 Census ===
The 2024 Census declared that the population of Crooks had shrunk down to 1,268 people compared to the 1,362 from the 2020 census report. The Median age range for the population is 43.6.

Of the 1,268 people, 53% are men. Their population is split into 501 different households with an average of 2.5 individuals per house. 79% of their households are occupied by married individuals, although only 70% of their total population are married.

17% of homes in Crooks are occupied by individuals who do not own the property. This includes long term and short-term rentals and subleases.

=== 2020 census ===
As of the 2020 census, Crooks had a population of 1,362. The median age was 37.5 years, 29.5% of residents were under the age of 18, and 11.2% were 65 years of age or older. For every 100 females there were 112.5 males, and for every 100 females age 18 and over there were 100.8 males.

0.0% of residents lived in urban areas, while 100.0% lived in rural areas.

There were 476 households in Crooks, of which 42.4% had children under the age of 18 living in them. Of all households, 66.6% were married-couple households, 11.1% were households with a male householder and no spouse or partner present, and 15.1% were households with a female householder and no spouse or partner present. About 17.0% of all households were made up of individuals and 7.0% had someone living alone who was 65 years of age or older.

There were 484 housing units, of which 1.7% were vacant. The homeowner vacancy rate was 0.0% and the rental vacancy rate was 6.1%.

Racial composition as of the 2020 census
Race	Number	Percent
White	1,284	94.3%
Black or African American	9	0.7%
American Indian and Alaska Native	9	0.7%
Asian	7	0.5%
Native Hawaiian and Other Pacific Islander	1	0.1%
Some other race	13	1.0%
Two or more races	39	2.9%
Hispanic or Latino (of any race)	30	2.2%

=== 2010 census ===
As of the census of 2010, there were 1,269 people, 431 households, and 345 families living in the city. The population density was 1,648.1 inhabitants per square mile (636.3/km^{2}). There were 440 housing units at an average density of 571.4 per square mile (220.6/km^{2}). The racial makeup of the city was 98.2% White, 0.1% Native American, 0.2% Asian, 0.5% from other races, and 1.1% from two or more races. Hispanic or Latino of any race were 2.0% of the population.

There were 431 households, of which 48.0% had children under the age of 18 living with them, 66.6% were married couples living together, 10.9% had a female householder with no husband present, 2.6% had a male householder with no wife present, and 20.0% were non-families. 15.3% of all households were made up of individuals, and 3.8% had someone living alone who was 65 years of age or older. The average household size was 2.94 and the average family size was 3.29.

The median age in the city was 31.4 years. 32.9% of residents were under the age of 18; 5.8% were between the ages of 18 and 24; 32.6% were from 25 to 44; 24.1% were from 45 to 64; and 4.6% were 65 years of age or older. The gender makeup of the city was 50.7% male and 49.3% female.

=== 2000 census ===
As of the census of 2000, there were 859 people, 282 households, and 232 families living in the city. The population density was 1,324.3 inhabitants per square mile (511.3/km^{2}). There were 289 housing units at an average density of 445.6 per square mile (172.0/km^{2}). The racial makeup of the city was 98.14% White, 1.05% Native American, 0.23% Asian, and 0.58% from two or more races.

There were 282 households, out of which 54.3% had children under the age of 18 living with them, 70.6% were married couples living together, 8.9% had a female householder with no husband present, and 17.7% were non-families. 13.1% of all households were made up of individuals, and 3.9% had someone living alone who was 65 years of age or older. The average household size was 3.05 and the average family size was 3.38.

In the city, the population was spread out, with 34.3% under the age of 18, 9.2% from 18 to 24, 34.2% from 25 to 44, 19.0% from 45 to 64, and 3.3% who were 65 years of age or older. The median age was 30 years. For every 100 females, there were 100.2 males. For every 100 females age 18 and over, there were 98.6 males.

As of 2000 the median income for a household in the city was $54,583, and the median income for a family was $56,528. Males had a median income of $31,065 versus $25,064 for females. The per capita income for the city was $17,512. About 0.8% of families and 1.7% of the population were below the poverty line, including 1.0% of those under age 18 and 4.3% of those age 65 or over.

== Education ==
Crooks is served by the Tri-Valley School District, which opened a new elementary school in the city for the 2023–2024 school year. The opening followed an increase in district enrollment from 830 students in 2011 to 953 in 2022. The new school provided additional classroom space and reduced crowding at the district's existing campus in Colton. Tri-Valley Elementary in Crooks serves students from kindergarten through fourth grade.
