= Victor Township, Roberts County, South Dakota =

Township in Roberts County, South Dakota

Coordinates: 45.8778°N 96.7814°W

Victor Township is a township in Roberts County, in the U.S. state of South Dakota.

== History ==
Victor Township was established in 1892 by Victor Renville, and named for him.
