= Interstate 190 (South Dakota) =

Highway in South Dakota

Interstate 190
- I-190 highlighted in red

Route information
- Auxiliary route of I-90
- Maintained by SDDOT
- Length: 1.72 mi (2.77 km)
- Existed: 1958–present
- History: Completed in 1962
- NHS: Entire route

Major junctions
- South end: I-90 BL / US 16 / SD 44 / SD 79 in Rapid City
- North end: I-90 / US 14 / US 16 / SD 79 in Rapid City

Location
- Country: United States
- State: South Dakota
- Counties: Pennington

Highway system
- Interstate Highway System; Main; Auxiliary; Suffixed; Business; Future; South Dakota State Trunk Highway System; Interstate; US; State
| ← SD 168 | → SD 203 |

Interstate 190 (I-190) is an auxiliary Interstate Highway in the US state of South Dakota. The route runs for about two miles (3.2 km) connecting I-90 to downtown Rapid City. The entire route is concurrent with US Highway 16 (US 16).

== Route description ==
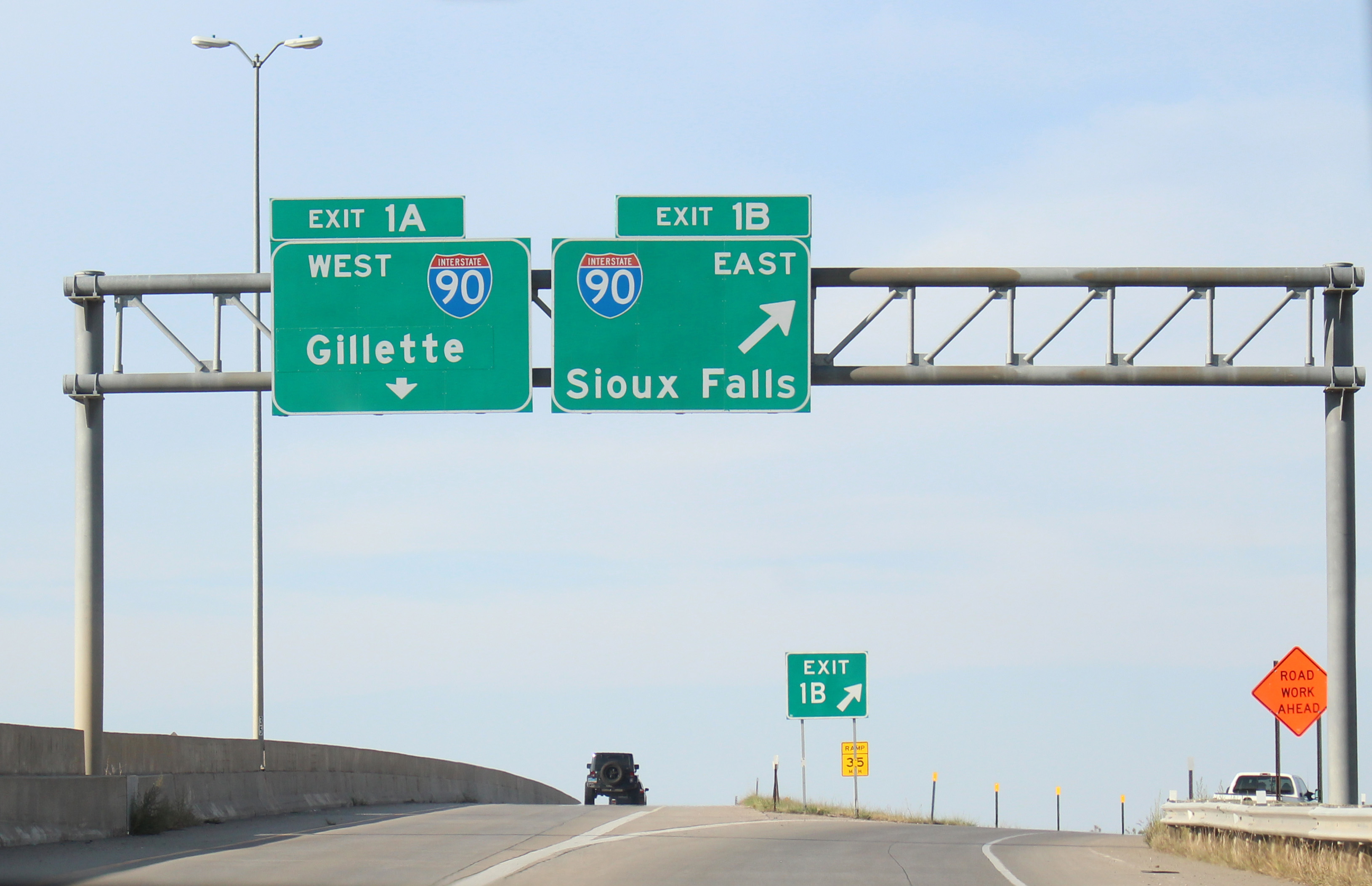
Northern terminus at I-90

I-190 begins as West Boulevard and has an intersection with Omaha Street, which is signed as US 16/South Dakota Highway 44 (SD 44). US 16 westbound goes east on Omaha Street and eastbound runs north concurrently with I-190. I-190 then becomes a freeway, with an exit to North Street. I-190 then passes under Anamosa Street before an onramp from the northbound lanes of West Boulevard. Both US 16 and I-190 then terminate at a trumpet interchange with I-90/US 14/SD 79.

=== State law ===
Legally, the route of I-190 is defined at South Dakota Codified Laws § 31-4-203.

== History ==
A freeway replacing West Bypass to connect downtown Rapid City to I-90 was proposed by the city government. The designation of I-190 for this connector was approved by the American Association of State Highway Officials in November 1958.

I-190 was opened in 1962 to connect Rapid City to the recently completed I-90 bypass, which was built outside of Rapid City's northern boundaries.

The interchange with I-90 was rebuilt from 2000 to 2001, changing from a directional T interchange with a left exit to a trumpet interchange. The Omaha Street intersection was rebuilt in 2004, while the North Street interchange was converted to a single-point urban interchange in 2017.

== Exit list ==
The entire route is in Rapid City, Pennington County.

| mi | km | Exit | Destinations | Notes |
|---|---|---|---|---|
| 0.00 | 0.00 | | West Boulevard to I-90 BL US 16 west / SD 44 (Omaha Street) – Mount Rushmore | Stoplight intersection; southern terminus of I-190; roadway continues as West Boulevard; southern end of US 16 concurrency |
| 0.38 | 0.61 | 1C | North Street – Civic Center | |
| 1.46 | 2.35 | 1A–1B | I-90 / US 16 ends / US 14 / SD 79 – Gillette, Sioux Falls | Trumpet interchange; I-190 northern terminus; US 16 eastern terminus; northern end of US 16 concurrency; signed as left exit 1A (west) and 1B (east); I-90 exit 57 |
1.000 mi = 1.609 km; 1.000 km = 0.621 mi: Concurrency terminus
