= McCook Lake =

Lake in the state of South Dakota, United States

- Location within South Dakota Location within the United States
- Location: Union County, near North Sioux City, South Dakota, US
- Coordinates: 42.541891°N 96.507340°W
- Type: Oxbow lake
- Basin countries: United States
- Surface area: 273 acres (1.10 km^{2})
- Average depth: 6 ft (1.8 m)
- Max. depth: 14 ft (4.3 m)
- Water volume: 732 acre-feet (0.903 hm^{3})
- Shore length^{1}: 6.9 mi (11.1 km)
- Surface elevation: 1,090.7 feet (332.4 m)
- Settlements: North Sioux City
- ^{1} Shore length is not a well-defined measure.

McCook Lake is a natural oxbow lake found in Union County, South Dakota, United States, about one mile north of North Sioux City. It was formed from a "cutoff" of the Missouri River. The lake is named for General John Cook, who commanded a company of soldiers stationed there in 1862–63 following the Dakota War of 1862. When or why the "Mc" was added is unknown. Most residents are located on the north side of the lake, while land around the south side is used for farming. The Izaak Walton League, an environmental organization active in lake issues, has a clubhouse located on the lake and owns most of the southern shore.

The lake's level is supported by pumping water from the Missouri River through a 24-inch pipe at the southwest end, transported over 1½ miles, which costs about $1,000 a week. Locks were installed by the WPA at each end of the lake in the 1930s to allow for control of the lake's level during the Missouri's high-flow periods, but because they no longer occur, these are no longer in use. The lake level has been maintained via the pump and a well since the 1970s. In the 1950s, Missouri River flooding deposited large amounts of silt in the lake.

A restoration project began in 1991, when the lake's average depth was 2–4 feet, to remove accumulated sediment (mostly clay and fine sand) of about 1,700,000 cubic yards (1,300,000 m^{3}) from the lake's bottom. Noting increased temperatures in the shallow lake and dense aquatic vegetation, the EPA's total maximum daily load analysis said: "The lake mimicked a prairie slough more than a lake." The dredging project's goal was to increase the average lake depth by 4.5 feet, with the aim of encouraging fish propagation in the lake and boosting its recreational use. As the project continued, more sediment was removed than originally anticipated. From 1991-1998, about 2,248,000 cubic yards (1,719,000 m^{3}) was removed, or 132 percent of the original estimate. Dredging was to continue through the year 2000. In 1999, local reports said the average lake depth had increased to 11 feet with the maximum depth at 15 feet. A 2011 fishing survey put measurements of its average depth at 6 feet with a maximum depth of 14 feet.

The 2011 Missouri River Flood affected McCook Lake, with record-level flooding on the river increasing the lake's depth more than five feet over its normal level. Lake managers reversed the pipeline flow to pump water back into the Missouri in order to prevent flooding of nearby homes and damage to city sewers. A no-wake zone was also implemented to prevent shoreline erosion. McCook Lake's pumps were damaged in the flood, but pumping was back in service by 2012. All three pumps were functioning again by April 2014.

McCook Lake experienced severe flooding in June 2024 after three days of historically heavy rains fell north of the area. Upstream communities North Sioux City and Dakota Dunes, acting on established flood abatement plans, built temporary levies designed to divert Missouri River floodwaters to McCook. Expensive lakeshore homes fell into the floodwaters and washouts created 100-foot drop-offs. A state department of natural resources geologist said that McCook would have flooded under the circumstances regardless of whether upstream levies were used. McCook flood response became an issue in 2024 when South Dakota governor Kristi Noem was nominated to head the future Trump Administration Federal Emergency Management Authority. Critics noted the governor did not activate the South Dakota National Guard to help McCook victims, and waited a month to request a federal disaster declaration, but spent millions to send the Guard to the Mexican border.

The primary fish species found in the lake are white crappie, black crappie, largemouth bass, channel catfish, and walleye. Other game there includes white bass, bluegill, gizzard shad, shortnose gar, bigmouth buffalo, freshwater drum, smallmouth buffalo, common carp, Shorthead Redhorse, and northern pike. Channel catfish, white crappie, walleye, and saugeye were stocked into the lake in the 1990s and 2000.

Plant life common in the lake includes cattails, bulrush, pondweed, and brittle naiad.
