= Interstate 229 (South Dakota) =

Auxiliary Interstate Highway in Sioux Falls, South Dakota, US

Interstate 229
- I-229 highlighted in red and I-229 Downtown Loop in blue

Route information
- Auxiliary route of I-29
- Maintained by SDDOT
- Length: 10.84 mi (17.45 km)
- Existed: 1958–present
- History: Completed in 1962
- NHS: Entire route

Major junctions
- South end: I-29 in Sioux Falls
- SD 115 in Sioux Falls; SD 42 in Sioux Falls
- North end: I-90 / CR 125 near Sioux Falls

Location
- Country: United States
- State: South Dakota
- Counties: Lincoln, Minnehaha

Highway system
- Interstate Highway System; Main; Auxiliary; Suffixed; Business; Future; South Dakota State Trunk Highway System; Interstate; US; State
← SD 224	→ SD 230

Interstate 229 (I-229) is an auxiliary Interstate Highway located entirely within Sioux Falls, South Dakota, United States. It runs for approximately 11 miles (18 km) around the southern and eastern sides of the city, providing a bypass route and connecting I-29 and I-90. The freeway is generally four-to-six lanes wide and follows the Big Sioux River through parts of the city. I-229 also has a business route that provides access to downtown Sioux Falls from the freeway.

An eastern bypass of Sioux Falls was proposed in the 1940s by the city government and developed over the following decade by the state government. It was incorporated into plans for the Interstate Highway System, which was approved by the federal government in 1956, and assigned the designation of I-229 in 1958. Construction began that year and was completed in two sections: the southern half in 1961 and the northern half in 1962.

Since its completion, I-229 has had several interchanges added to serve new development in Sioux Falls. The existing junctions were also modified or replaced to meet later traffic needs and updated design standards, including the state's first single-point urban interchange. Beyond the northern terminus at I-90, the freeway originally transitioned into a gravel road, which was paved in 2006.

== Route description ==
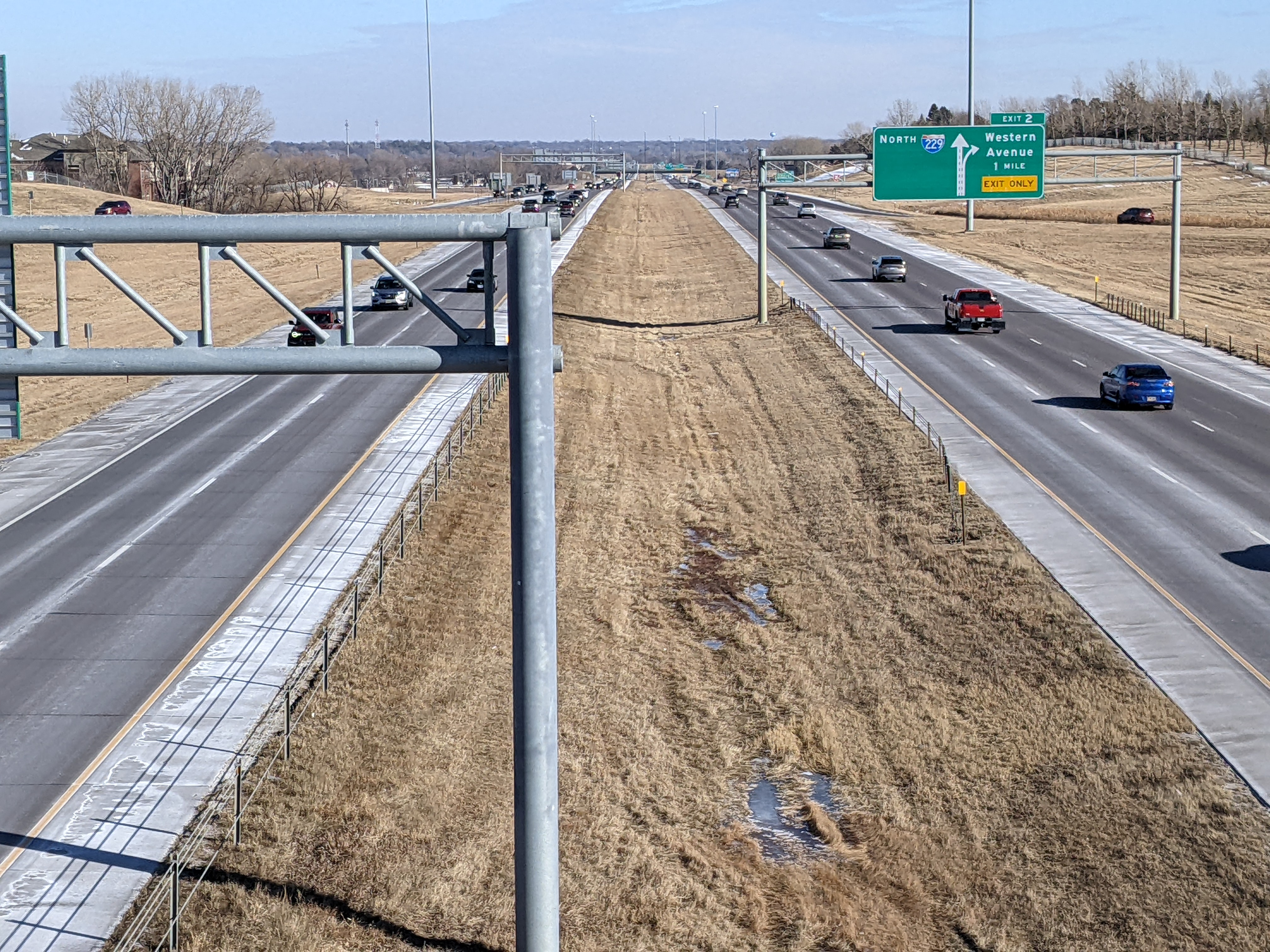
I-229 northbound from the Louise Avenue interchange in southwestern Sioux Falls

I-229 begins in southwestern Sioux Falls at a trumpet interchange with I-29 near The Empire Mall, the state's busiest shopping center. The freeway travels northeast, passing the Avera Heart Hospital, and crosses the Lincoln–Minnehaha county line. It then crosses the Big Sioux River, which it follows through several city parks and interchanges that serve a commercial district along 41st Street and the Western Mall, another major shopping center. Near the Augustana University campus, I-229 intersects Minnesota Avenue, which carries Highway 115 (SD 115) and the southern leg of the Downtown Loop, a business route connecting to downtown Sioux Falls.

The freeway turns north along the Big Sioux River, passing next to Lincoln High School at Cliff Avenue, and serves an interchange at East 26th Street before leaving the river. I-229 continues through a residential neighborhood east of downtown Sioux Falls and is rejoined by the Downtown Loop at a single-point urban interchange with East 10th Street (part of SD 42). The freeway crosses over a railroad and the Big Sioux River before passing through industrial park near Sioux Falls Regional Airport. I-229 terminates northeast of the city at a partial cloverleaf interchange with I-90, while the road continues as 476th Avenue (County Route 125).

The freeway generally has four lanes for through traffic and two auxiliary lanes between certain interchanges. I-229 is maintained by the South Dakota Department of Transportation (SD DOT), who conduct an annual survey of traffic volume that is expressed in terms of annual average daily traffic (AADT), a measure of traffic volume for any average day of the year. Traffic volumes on the highway in 2020 ranged from a minimum of 21,230 vehicles at its northern terminus to a maximum of 42,460 vehicles between Minnesota and Cliff avenues.

== History ==
=== Planning and construction ===
Plans for southeastern bypass of Sioux Falls were proposed by the city government in the 1940s, initially for use by U.S. Route 77 (US 77), the predecessor of I-29. It would generally follow the Big Sioux River, existing railroads, and Logan Avenue, terminating near downtown at Cliff Avenue. The US 77 bypass was among the routes in a 1950 streets plan approved by the city planning commission, alongside a northern bypass for SD 38 (later I-90). The plan was forwarded to the South Dakota Department of Highways for further development and to the federal Bureau of Public Roads (BPR), who endorsed the proposal in 1954.

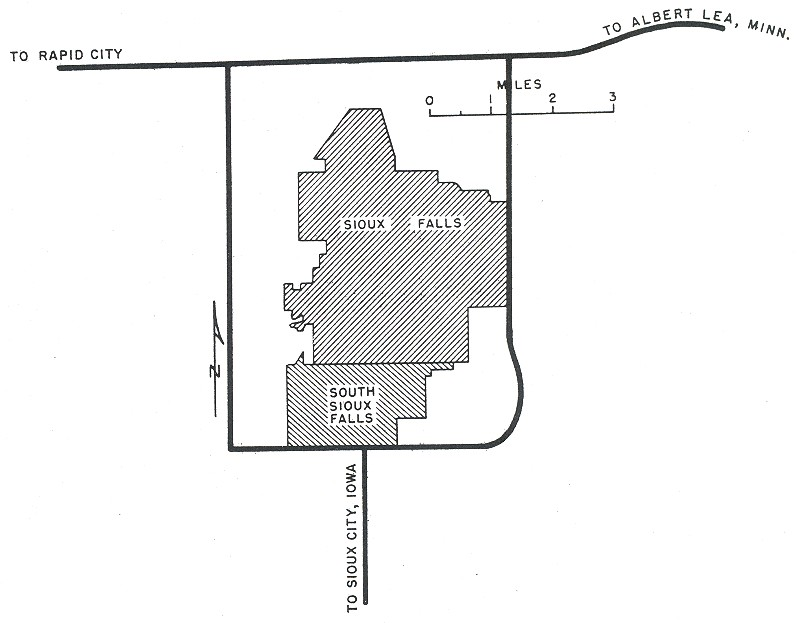
The 1955 federal Bureau of Public Roads plan for highways in Sioux Falls, which included the eastern bypass

The BPR later included the bypass in their 1955 recommendation for urban routes that would form the national Interstate Highway System, which was approved by the U.S. Congress in 1956. The route was revised to connect with a new western bypass southwest of Sioux Falls and continue to the northern bypass instead of terminating near downtown. The designation of I-229 for the bypass was approved by the American Association of State Highway Officials in November 1958.

Construction of the southern terminus of the bypass, connecting I-229 to I-29 in Lincoln County, began in early 1958. By the end of the year, plans for the freeway were completed and right-of-way acquisition had begun following appraisals of affected properties. This included a 198-foot-wide (60 m) strip near Logan Avenue in eastern Sioux Falls that had been acquired by the state government in 1949 with funds from the relocation of the South Dakota School for the Deaf. Another major acquisition, completed in late 1959, was the transfer of 41 acres (17 ha) from the Minnehaha County poor farm, which would be needed for the I-90 and I-229 interchange.

Work on the southern section from I-29 to East 10th Street began in May 1959, but was briefly paused a month later by a strike by an engineers union over the refusal to recognize a union representative. By January 1960, the southern section was declared half completed; it opened to traffic in mid-1961. The remaining section of I-229 began construction in 1961 and was opened on October 30, 1962, at a cost of $1.97 million (equivalent to $15.6 million in 2024). The freeway initially had five intermediate junctions, but added a sixth with the opening of the East 26th Street interchange in December 1969.

=== Later interchanges and projects ===
The completion of the freeway system around Sioux Falls led to residential and commercial development in the southwestern reaches of the city due to its proximity to I-29 and I-229. Two major shopping centers, the Western Mall and The Empire Mall, opened in 1968 and 1973, respectively, anchoring a retail strip along 41st Street. The I-29 and I-229 interchange, originally built without access to the north to reduce costs, was expanded into a full trumpet interchange in late 1983. The expansion was made possible by the abandonment of a railroad that ran parallel to I-229. A pair of new interchanges—I-29 at West 26th Street and I-229 at Louise Avenue—were proposed in the 1980s to relieve traffic congestion at the Western Avenue interchange, which provided the main access to the retail area. The Louise Avenue interchange opened in December 1993 at a cost of $8 million (equivalent to $15.6 million in 2024).

An additional interchange was proposed at Benson Road in northeastern Sioux Falls in the 1980s to serve planned industrial parks in the area and was formally approved by the state government in 1989. It was scheduled to be completed in November 1991, but was delayed due to construction issues; the ramps were barricaded over the winter months, but were moved by motorists who used the unfinished interchange as a shortcut. The interchange opened in 1992 and was the first in eastern South Dakota to have planted wildflower patches to beautify the area, but they were later mowed due to excessive growth and the introduction of invasive weeds.

Several interchanges on I-229 were also rebuilt by the state government in the 1990s to address traffic congestion issues and replace outdated designs. The East 10th Street exit was replaced with South Dakota's first single-point urban interchange in 1995, which required workers to direct traffic for confused motorists upon opening. The Western Avenue interchange was closed from 1994 to 1995 while it was rebuilt with additional lanes at a cost of $15 million (equivalent to $28.1 million in 2024). The project also included the replacement of two bridges carrying I-229 over the nearby Big Sioux River, as well as a tunnel for East 57th Street under the freeway. The loop ramp at the I-29 and I-229 interchange was rebuilt in 2016 as part of a project to widen I-29. A widening project for East 26th Street in 2019 included reconstructing part of its interchange with I-229 to decouple Yeager Road from the western ramps.

I-229 once had the distinction of being the only Interstate in the country that transitioned directly from a four-lane concrete freeway to a two-lane gravel road. 476th Avenue, the continuation of the highway beyond its northern terminus at the interchange with I-90, was paved in 2006 after Minnehaha County took over its maintenance. A proposal from the state government to close access to 476th Avenue from the interchange in the 1990s was rejected following criticism from Minnehaha County and Sioux Falls officials.

A second bypass of Sioux Falls, designated as SD 100, is planned to run south and east of I-229. It was first proposed in the 1990s and began construction in the late 2010s. The first section of Highway 100 opened in 2021, but completion of the full 17-mile (27 km) route is not funded. The state government has also identified several interchanges in I-229 that are prioritized for improvement or replacement, with a study completed in 2017 and construction scheduled to begin in 2024 on the first projects. Another plan recommended that the freeway be widened to six lanes between East 26th Street and East 10th Street by 2035 to handle expected traffic demand.

Exit 1A will contain an additional offramp to serve 85th Street at I-29 exit 74 which is under construction as of 2026.

== Exit list ==
County	Location	mi	km	Exit	Destinations	Notes
Lincoln	Sioux Falls	0.00	0.00	1A–B	I-29	Southern terminus; signed as left exit 1A (south) and 1B (north) southbound; construction to add additional ramp to 85th Street
Lincoln	Sioux Falls	0.92	1.48	1C	Louise Avenue	
Minnehaha	Sioux Falls	2.07	3.33	2	Western Avenue	
Minnehaha	Sioux Falls	3.12	5.02	3	I-229 Dwtn. / SD 115 (Minnesota Avenue)	Southern terminus of I-229 Dwtn.
Minnehaha	Sioux Falls	4.16	6.69	4	Cliff Avenue	
Minnehaha	Sioux Falls	5.32	8.56	5	26th Street	Also serves 33rd Street
Minnehaha	Sioux Falls	6.67	10.73	6	10th Street – Downtown	Northern terminus of I-229 Dwtn.
Minnehaha	Sioux Falls	7.84	12.62	7	Rice Street – Brandon	
Minnehaha	Sioux Falls	9.46	15.22	9	Benson Road	
Minnehaha	Mapleton Township	10.84	17.45	10	I-90; CR 125 (476th Avenue)	Northern terminus; signed as exits 10A (west) and 10B (east); roadway continues as CR 125
1.000 mi = 1.609 km; 1.000 km = 0.621 mi

== Downtown Loop ==
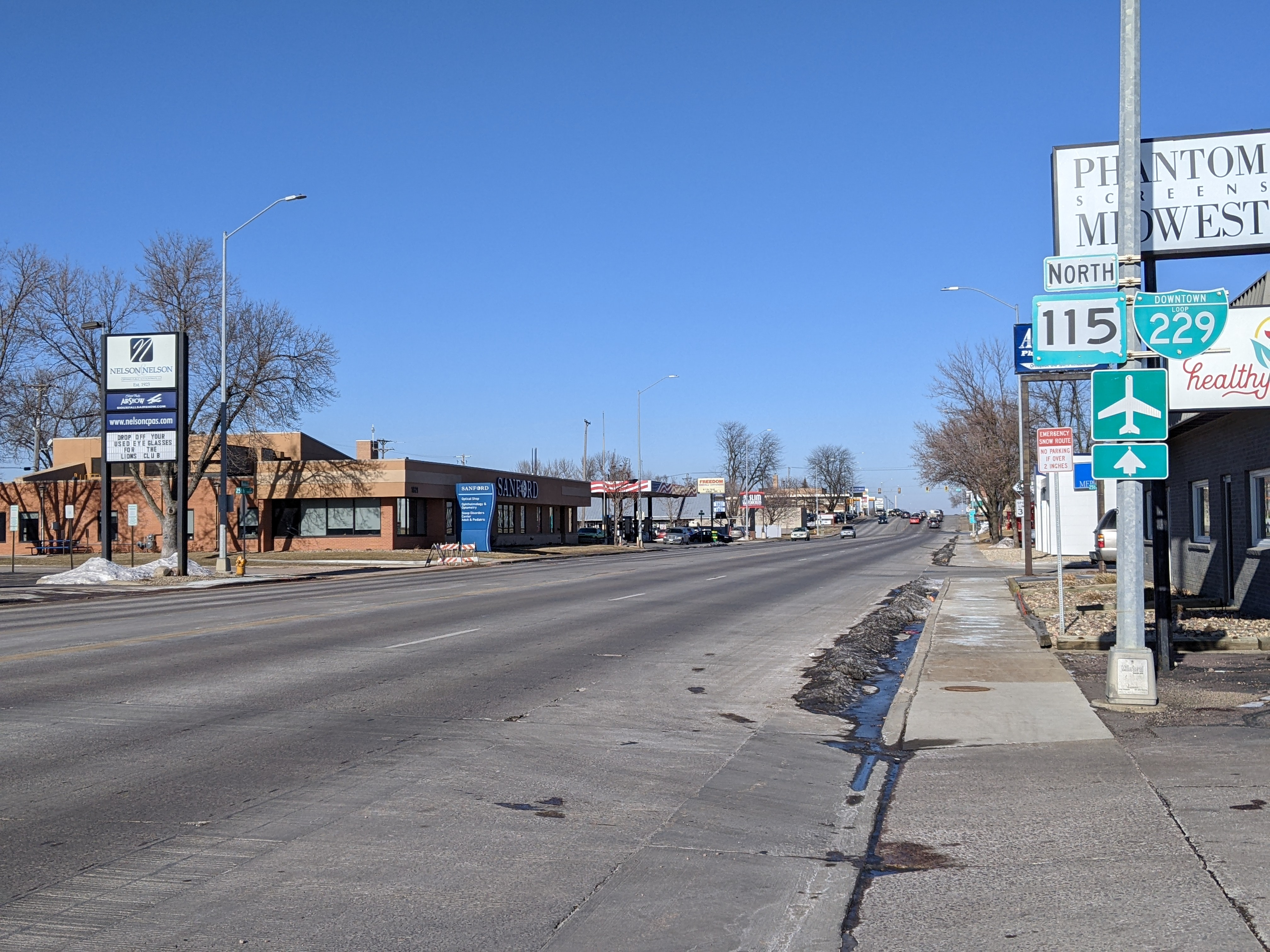
The I-229 Downtown Loop and SD 115 on Minnesota Avenue

Interstate 229 Downtown Loop
- Location: Sioux Falls, South Dakota
- Length: 4.3 mi (6.9 km)

Interstate 229 Downtown Loop (I-229 Dwtn.) is an urban business route serving downtown Sioux Falls. It begins at the Highway 115 (SD 115) interchange along I-229 in the southern part of the city and follows Minnesota Avenue towards downtown Sioux Falls. It turns east onto SD 42 at East 11th Street, part of a one-way couplet with East 10th Street carrying westbound traffic. The streets cross the Big Sioux River near Falls Park and merge onto East 10th Street, which traverses a retail area before rejoining I-229. The Downtown Loop ends at a single-point urban interchange with I-229 in the eastern part of the city, while SD 42 continues east towards the Iowa state line.

The Downtown Loop incorporated parts of former US 77 on Minnesota Avenue and US 16 on East 10th Street. US 16 was truncated to Rapid City in 1978 and replaced with SD 42; US 77 was removed in 1981 and renumbered to SD 115. The highway's twinned crossings of the Big Sioux River east of downtown Sioux Falls were originally a single bridge that carried East 10th Street. The bridge, which opened in 1890, was replaced in 1930 by a new viaduct spanning more than 700 feet (210 m) of the river and adjacent railroad. An eastbound viaduct carrying an extension of East 11th Street was proposed in the 1960s and opened in November 1971; it cost $1.48 million to construct (equivalent to $8.76 million in 2024) the 1,578-foot (481 m) structure. The Downtown Loop was subsequently split into a pair of one-way streets; the renovated westbound viaduct on East 10th Street was reopened in August 1979.

=== Major intersections ===
The entire route is in Sioux Falls, Minnehaha County.

mi	km	Destinations	Notes
0.0	0.0	SD 115 south (Minnesota Avenue south) / I-229	Southern terminus; southern end of SD 115 overlap
2.4– 2.5	3.9– 4.0	SD 115 north (Minnesota Avenue north) / I-29 Dwtn. / SD 42 (11th Street)	11th Street only carries eastbound traffic; southern end of SD 42 overlap
2.4– 2.5	3.9– 4.0	I-29 Dwtn. / SD 42 west (10th Street west) / SD 115 north (Minnesota Avenue north) – Arena, Convention Center	10th Street only carries westbound traffic; northern end of SD 115 overlap
4.3	6.9	SD 42 east (10th Street east) / I-229	Northern terminus; northern end of SD 42 overlap
1.000 mi = 1.609 km; 1.000 km = 0.621 mi: Concurrency terminus
