= Worthing, South Dakota =

- City
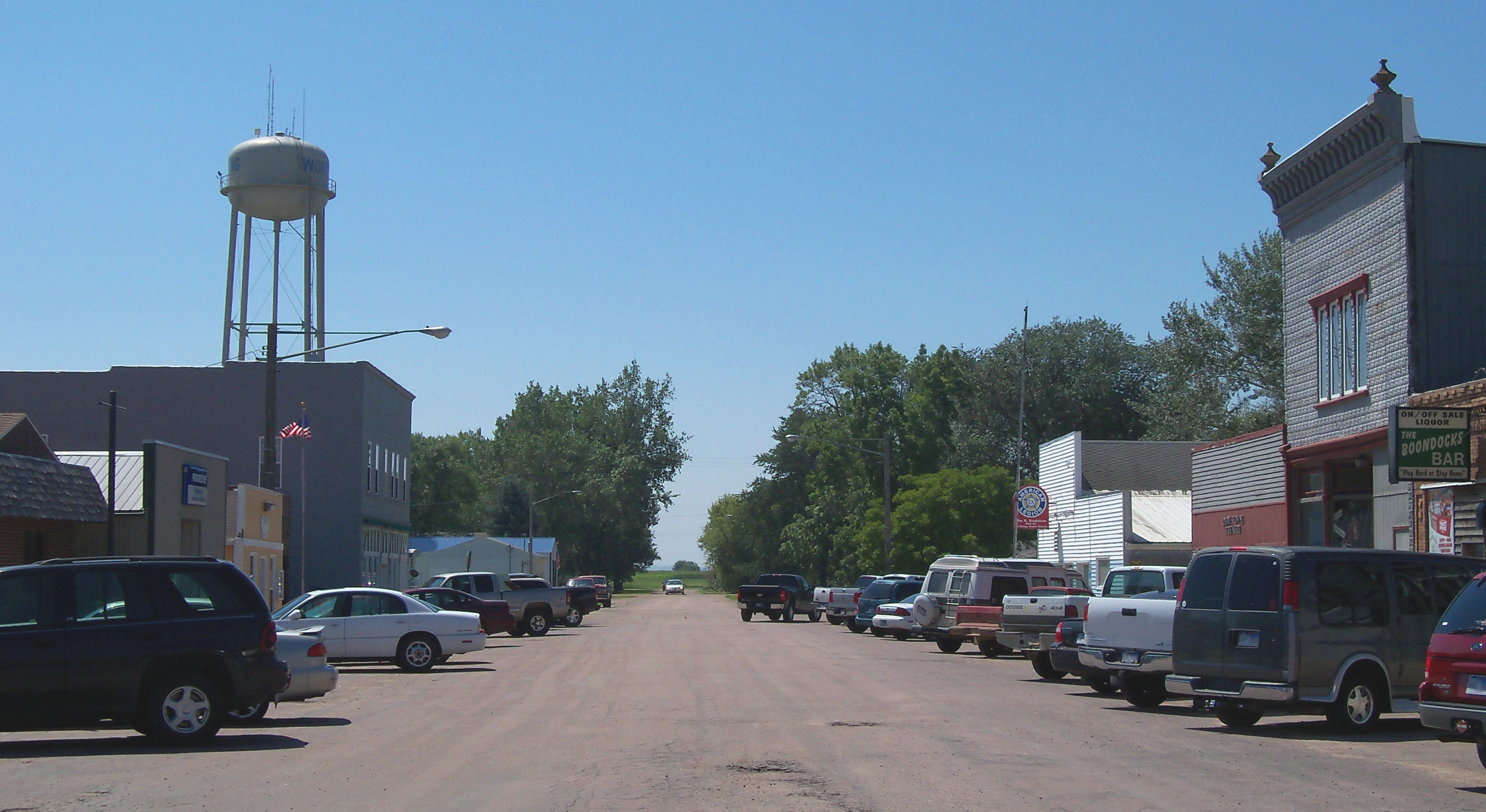
- Downtown Worthing, South Dakota
- Motto: A Quiet Place to Call Home
- Location in Lincoln County and the state of South Dakota
- Coordinates: 43°19′48″N 96°46′06″W
- Country: United States
- State: South Dakota
- County: Lincoln
- Founded: 1879

Area
  - Total: 0.56 sq mi (1.45 km^{2})
  - Land: 0.56 sq mi (1.45 km^{2})
  - Water: 0 sq mi (0.00 km^{2})
- Elevation: 1,365 ft (416 m)

Population (2020)
  - Total: 927
  - Density: 1,652.5/sq mi (638.03/km^{2})
- Time zone: UTC-6 (Central (CST))
  - Summer (DST): UTC-5 (CDT)
- ZIP code: 57077
- Area code: 605
- FIPS code: 46-72820
- GNIS feature ID: 1267663
- Website: cityofworthing.com

Worthing is a city in Lincoln County, South Dakota, United States and is located south of Sioux Falls. The population was 927 at the 2020 census.

== History ==
Worthing was laid out in 1879, and named after a railroad employee.

== Geography ==
According to the United States Census Bureau, the city has a total area of 0.56 square miles (1.45 km^{2}), all land.

== Demographics ==
Historical population
Census	Pop.	Note	%±
1900	213		—
1910	179		−16.0%
1920	238		33.0%
1930	262		10.1%
1940	291		11.1%
1950	272		−6.5%
1960	304		11.8%
1970	294		−3.3%
1980	388		32.0%
1990	371		−4.4%
2000	585		57.7%
2010	877		49.9%
2020	927		5.7%
U.S. Decennial Census

=== 2020 census ===
As of the 2020 census, Worthing had a population of 927. The median age was 31.3 years. 31.2% of residents were under the age of 18 and 8.1% of residents were 65 years of age or older. For every 100 females there were 108.3 males, and for every 100 females age 18 and over there were 103.8 males age 18 and over.

0.0% of residents lived in urban areas, while 100.0% lived in rural areas.

There were 329 households in Worthing, of which 44.1% had children under the age of 18 living in them. Of all households, 63.8% were married-couple households, 18.2% were households with a male householder and no spouse or partner present, and 10.3% were households with a female householder and no spouse or partner present. About 17.4% of all households were made up of individuals and 6.3% had someone living alone who was 65 years of age or older.

There were 341 housing units, of which 3.5% were vacant. The homeowner vacancy rate was 1.3% and the rental vacancy rate was 0.0%.

Racial composition as of the 2020 census
Race	Number	Percent
White	868	93.6%
Black or African American	3	0.3%
American Indian and Alaska Native	12	1.3%
Asian	2	0.2%
Native Hawaiian and Other Pacific Islander	1	0.1%
Some other race	8	0.9%
Two or more races	33	3.6%
Hispanic or Latino (of any race)	12	1.3%

=== 2010 census ===
As of the census of 2010, there were 877 people, 325 households, and 236 families residing in the town. The racial makeup of the town was 96.6% White, 1.0% Black or African-American, 0.8% Native American, 0.3% Asian, 0.0% from other races, and 1.3% from two or more races. Hispanic or Latino of any race were 0.7% of the population.

There were 325 households, of which 44.6% had children under the age of 18 living with them, 60.6% were married couples living together, 8.3% had a female householder with no husband present, and 27.4% were non-families. 18.8% of all households were made up of individuals, and 5.9% had someone living alone who was 65 years of age or older. The average household size was 2.7 and the average family size was 3.13.

In the town the population was spread out, with 27.9% under the age of 15, 10.6% from 15 to 24, 36.4% from 25 to 44, 21.0% from 45 to 64, and 5.1% who were 65 years of age or older. The median age was 29.2 years. Males make up 49.9% compared to 50.1% for females.

=== 2000 census ===
As of the census of 2000, there were 585 people, 206 households, and 163 families residing in the town. The population density was 1,276.7 inhabitants per square mile (492.9/km^{2}). There were 213 housing units at an average density of 464.9 units per square mile (179.5 units/km^{2}). The racial makeup of the town was 98.97% White, 0.51% Native American, 0.17% Asian, 0.17% from other races, and 0.17% from two or more races. Hispanic or Latino of any race were 0.51% of the population.

There were 206 households, out of which 47.1% had children under the age of 18 living with them, 68.4% were married couples living together, 6.8% had a female householder with no husband present, and 20.4% were non-families. 14.6% of all households were made up of individuals, and 4.4% had someone living alone who was 65 years of age or older. The average household size was 2.84 and the average family size was 3.16.

In the town the population was spread out, with 30.6% under the age of 18, 9.4% from 18 to 24, 38.5% from 25 to 44, 16.6% from 45 to 64, and 5.0% who were 65 years of age or older. The median age was 29 years. For every 100 females, there were 103.1 males. For every 100 females age 18 and over, there were 100.0 males.

== Education ==
Worthing is a part of the Lennox School District 41-4, which operates Worthing Elementary, and LWC Junior High School/Lennox High School.
