= North Sioux City, South Dakota =

North Sioux City
- City
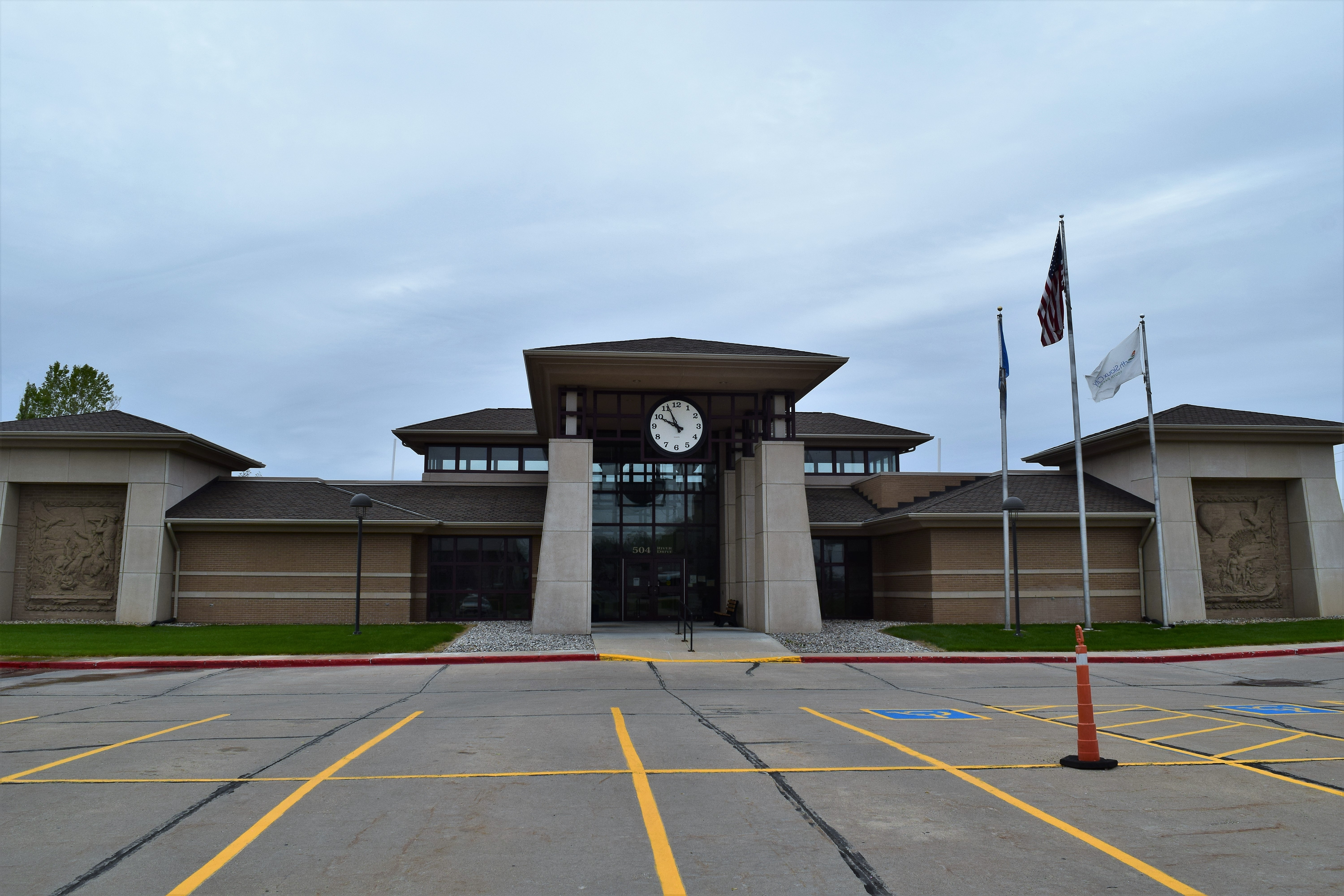
- North Sioux City city hall

- Location in Union County and the state of South Dakota
- Coordinates: 42°32′34″N 96°30′32″W
- Country: United States
- State: South Dakota
- County: Union
- Incorporated: 1951

Area
  - City: 2.71 sq mi (7.02 km^{2})
  - Land: 2.68 sq mi (6.94 km^{2})
  - Water: 0.027 sq mi (0.07 km^{2})
- Elevation: 1,109 ft (338 m)

Population (2020)
  - City: 3,042
  - Density: 1,134.6/sq mi (438.08/km^{2})
  - Urban: 113,066 (US: 298th)
  - Metro: 143,776 (US: 297th)
- Time zone: UTC-6 (Central (CST))
  - Summer (DST): UTC-5 (CDT)
- ZIP code: 57049
- Area code: 605
- FIPS code: 46-45700
- GNIS feature ID: 1267510
- Website: northsiouxcity-sd.gov

North Sioux City is a city in Union County, South Dakota, United States. The population was 3,042 at the 2020 census. It is part of the Sioux City metropolitan area.

== History ==
The southern tip of this land between the Missouri River from the west and south and the Big Sioux River from the north and east was a meeting place for Native American Indians traveling the two rivers. Area tribes current to the 1804 Lewis and Clark expedition were the Omaha, Yankton Dakota and Ponca, all Siouan language speakers.

French-Canadian farmer Joseph La Plant, born ca. 1823 in Indiana, settled at Sioux Point in 1849 and is listed with other early settlers in the 1860 census as living "Between Big Sioux and Big Stone Lake" in the "Unorganized" area of Minnesota, with the closest post office located immediately down and across the rivers in Sioux City, Iowa.

North Sioux City was incorporated in 1951.

== Geography ==
North Sioux City is bounded on the east by the Big Sioux River and on the west by the oxbow McCook Lake.

According to the United States Census Bureau, the city has a total area of 2.29 square miles (5.93 km^{2}), of which 2.26 square miles (5.85 km^{2}) is land and 0.03 square miles (0.08 km^{2}) is water.

== Demographics ==
Historical population
Census	Pop.	Note	%±
1960	736		—
1970	860		16.8%
1980	1,992		131.6%
1990	2,019		1.4%
2000	2,288		13.3%
2010	2,530		10.6%
2020	3,042		20.2%
2023 (est.)	3,048		0.2%
U.S. Decennial Census; 2020 Census

=== 2020 census ===
As of the 2020 census, North Sioux City had a population of 3,042. The median age was 39.4 years; 20.8% of residents were under the age of 18 and 17.2% of residents were 65 years of age or older. For every 100 females there were 99.9 males, and for every 100 females age 18 and over there were 98.9 males age 18 and over.

There were 1,396 households in North Sioux City, of which 25.0% had children under the age of 18 living with them. Of all households, 39.0% were married-couple households, 23.8% were households with a male householder and no spouse or partner present, and 27.1% were households with a female householder and no spouse or partner present. About 35.3% of all households were made up of individuals and 12.6% had someone living alone who was 65 years of age or older.

There were 1,461 housing units, of which 4.4% were vacant. The homeowner vacancy rate was 0.9% and the rental vacancy rate was 2.9%.

99.2% of residents lived in urban areas, while 0.8% lived in rural areas.

Racial composition as of the 2020 census
Race	Number	Percent
White	2,566	84.4%
Black or African American	72	2.4%
American Indian and Alaska Native	55	1.8%
Asian	30	1.0%
Native Hawaiian and Other Pacific Islander	24	0.8%
Some other race	91	3.0%
Two or more races	204	6.7%
Hispanic or Latino (of any race)	199	6.5%

=== 2010 census ===
As of the census of 2010, there were 2,530 people, 1,073 households, and 679 families living in the city. The population density was 1,119.5 inhabitants per square mile (432.2/km^{2}). There were 1,146 housing units at an average density of 507.1 per square mile (195.8/km^{2}). The racial makeup of the city was 93.5% White, 0.6% African American, 1.3% Native American, 0.6% Asian, 0.1% Pacific Islander, 1.4% from other races, and 2.6% from two or more races. Hispanic or Latino of any race were 3.8%.

Of the 1,073 households 31.5% had children under the age of 18 living with them, 46.3% were married couples living together, 12.0% had a female householder with no husband present, 4.9% had a male householder with no wife present, and 36.7% were non-families. 30.3% of households were one person and 10.2% were one person aged 65 or older. The average household size was 2.36 and the average family size was 2.93.

The median age was 37.4 years. 24.7% of residents were under the age of 18; 7.7% were between the ages of 18 and 24; 27% were from 25 to 44; 27.4% were from 45 to 64; and 13.1% were 65 or older. The gender makeup of the city was 49.0% male and 51.0% female.

=== 2000 census ===
As of the census of 2000, there were 2,288 people, 916 households, and 621 families living in the city. The population density was 1,021.7 inhabitants per square mile (394.5/km^{2}). There were 953 housing units at an average density of 425.6 per square mile (164.3/km^{2}). The racial makeup of the city was 95.32% White, 0.61% African American, 0.79% Native American, 1.05% Asian, 0.04% Pacific Islander, 0.57% from other races, and 1.62% from two or more races. Hispanic or Latino of any race were 2.49% of the population.

Of the 916 households 37.2% had children under the age of 18 living with them, 51.3% were married couples living together, 11.8% had a female householder with no husband present, and 32.1% were non-families. 25.0% of households were one person and 7.9% were one person aged 65 or older. The average household size was 2.50 and the average family size was 2.99.

The age distribution was 27.1% under the age of 18, 9.3% from 18 to 24, 32.3% from 25 to 44, 20.7% from 45 to 64, and 10.6% 65 or older. The median age was 34 years. For every 100 females, there were 106.9 males. For every 100 females age 18 and over, there were 104.2 males.

The median household income was $39,333, and the median family income was $44,926. Males had a median income of $31,800 versus $22,480 for females. The per capita income for the city was $21,416. About 5.0% of families and 5.7% of the population were below the poverty line, including 9.3% of those under age 18 and 3.7% of those age 65 or over.

== Major businesses ==
Military Road is locally known as "The Strip" hosts a number of casinos and fireworks stores. These take advantage of the lack of these products in neighboring Nebraska. Legalization of recreational marijuana in South Dakota is expected to encourage the opening of similar shops selling to out-of-state customers.

North Sioux City is the former home of Gateway, Inc., the area's most well-known employer. At its height, Gateway had over 6000 employees. After Acer Computers bought out the majority of Gateway (MPC of Idaho purchased the business portion) in late 2007, several layoffs have taken place. Fewer than 100 people have jobs at the original facility. Acer has expressed interest in selling the facility.

Other companies are renting from the facility, including Alorica, which absorbed a number of Gateway phone jobs. They are handling the AT&T account.

On August 18, 2008, MPC announced the lay-offs of 55 people currently employed (who were all former Gateway employees). On October 17, 2008, MPC laid-off 98 more employees at the former Gateway facility, many of whom were former Gateway employees.

Mars Petcare purchased the city's Menu Foods plant in October 2007 and operated it until 2011, when the plant was turned over to Mars' Royal Canin division. In 2016 Royal Canin broke ground on a 45,000 sq ft addition to the plant and invested about $60 million in state-of-the-art facilities to enhance its production of specialty pet foods.

In response to steadily increasing demand for their pet food products, Royal Canin announced in February 2022 that they would invest another $185 million in new production lines at their North Sioux City plant, which is expected to create 149 new jobs. As of February 2022, Royal Canin was operating 12 production plants in Europe, Russia, Africa, East Asia, South America and North America.

== Education ==
North Sioux City Public Schools are part of the Dakota Valley School District (South Dakota). The Dakota Valley School District has one elementary school, one middle school, and one high school.

Students attend Dakota Valley High School.

== Transportation ==
Transit in the city is provided by Sioux City Transit. Route 5 provides bus service connecting the city to Sioux City, Iowa.

=== Rail ===
BNSF provides rail freight service. Amtrak does not serve any community in South Dakota. On June 23, 2024, a BNSF railway bridge near North Sioux City collapsed due to flooding.
