= Elk Point, South Dakota =

Elk Point
- City
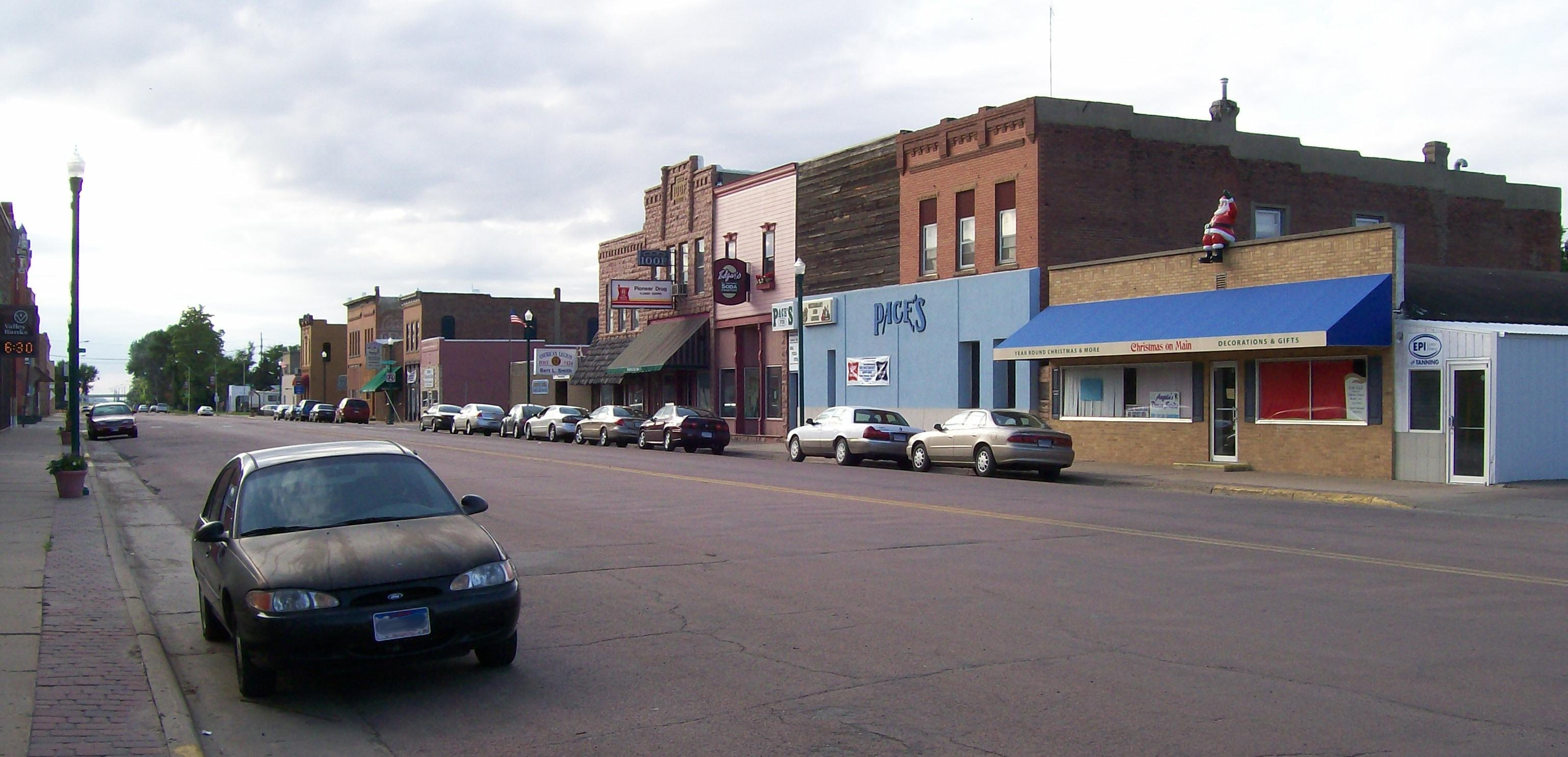
- Main Street in Elk Point and some of the businesses located there

- Location in Union County and the state of South Dakota
- Coordinates: 42°40′52″N 96°40′50″W
- Country: United States
- State: South Dakota
- County: Union
- Incorporated: January 10, 1873

Area
  - Total: 1.55 sq mi (4.01 km^{2})
  - Land: 1.55 sq mi (4.01 km^{2})
  - Water: 0 sq mi (0.00 km^{2})
- Elevation: 1,125 ft (343 m)

Population (2020)
  - Total: 2,149
  - Density: 1,387.7/sq mi (535.79/km^{2})
- Time zone: UTC–6 (Central (CST))
  - Summer (DST): UTC–5 (CDT)
- ZIP code: 57025
- Area code: 605
- FIPS code: 46-18620
- GNIS feature ID: 1267378
- Sales tax: 6.2%
- Website: elkpoint.org

Elk Point is a city in and the county seat of Union County, South Dakota, United States. The population was 2,149 as of the 2020 census.

== History ==
The British established a Hudson's Bay Company trading post in 1755 near present-day Elk Point. Elk Point was so named on account of the abundant elk in the area. The town was incorporated in 1873.

== Geography ==
According to the United States Census Bureau, the city has a total area of 1.36 square miles (3.52 km^{2}), all land.

== Demographics ==
Historical population
Census	Pop.	Note	%±
1900	1,081		—
1910	1,200		11.0%
1920	1,470		22.5%
1930	1,294		−12.0%
1940	1,483		14.6%
1950	1,367		−7.8%
1960	1,378		0.8%
1970	1,372		−0.4%
1980	1,661		21.1%
1990	1,423		−14.3%
2000	1,714		20.4%
2010	1,963		14.5%
2020	2,149		9.5%
2023 (est.)	2,075		−3.4%
U.S. Decennial Census; 2020 Census

It is part of the Sioux City metropolitan area.

=== 2020 census ===
As of the 2020 census, Elk Point had a population of 2,149. The median age was 37.6 years. 27.8% of residents were under the age of 18 and 16.9% of residents were 65 years of age or older. For every 100 females there were 98.6 males, and for every 100 females age 18 and over there were 97.7 males age 18 and over.

0.0% of residents lived in urban areas, while 100.0% lived in rural areas.

There were 854 households in Elk Point, of which 35.7% had children under the age of 18 living in them. Of all households, 53.2% were married-couple households, 18.4% were households with a male householder and no spouse or partner present, and 23.4% were households with a female householder and no spouse or partner present. About 29.9% of all households were made up of individuals and 15.3% had someone living alone who was 65 years of age or older.

There were 903 housing units, of which 5.4% were vacant. The homeowner vacancy rate was 1.0% and the rental vacancy rate was 8.7%.

Racial composition as of the 2020 census
Race	Number	Percent
White	1,976	91.9%
Black or African American	10	0.5%
American Indian and Alaska Native	13	0.6%
Asian	14	0.7%
Native Hawaiian and Other Pacific Islander	1	0.0%
Some other race	37	1.7%
Two or more races	98	4.6%
Hispanic or Latino (of any race)	86	4.0%

=== 2010 census ===
As of the census of 2010, there were 1,963 people, 770 households, and 505 families living in the city. The population density was 1,443.4 inhabitants per square mile (557.3/km^{2}). There were 830 housing units at an average density of 610.3 per square mile (235.6/km^{2}). The racial makeup of the city was 97.0% White, 0.3% African American, 0.6% Native American, 0.2% Asian, 0.8% from other races, and 1.2% from two or more races. Hispanic or Latino of any race were 1.5% of the population.

There were 770 households, of which 37.5% had children under the age of 18 living with them, 51.9% were married couples living together, 8.4% had a female householder with no husband present, 5.2% had a male householder with no wife present, and 34.4% were non-families. 30.8% of all households were made up of individuals, and 15% had someone living alone who was 65 years of age or older. The average household size was 2.49 and the average family size was 3.16.

The median age in the city was 36.3 years. 30.4% of residents were under the age of 18; 4.9% were between the ages of 18 and 24; 25.7% were from 25 to 44; 25% were from 45 to 64; and 14% were 65 years of age or older. The gender makeup of the city was 48.0% male and 52.0% female.

=== 2000 census ===
As of the census of 2000, there were 1,714 people, 682 households, and 459 families living in the city. The population density was 1,276.0 inhabitants per square mile (492.7/km^{2}). There were 750 housing units at an average density of 558.4 per square mile (215.6/km^{2}). The racial makeup of the city was 98.54% White, 0.18% African American, 0.23% Native American, 0.35% Asian, 0.18% from other races, and 0.53% from two or more races. Hispanic or Latino of any race were 0.93% of the population.

There were 682 households, out of which 33.6% had children under the age of 18 living with them, 56.2% were married couples living together, 7.5% had a female householder with no husband present, and 32.6% were non-families. 28.6% of all households were made up of individuals, and 14.1% had someone living alone who was 65 years of age or older. The average household size was 2.43 and the average family size was 3.00.

In the city, the population was spread out, with 26.7% under the age of 18, 8.7% from 18 to 24, 27.8% from 25 to 44, 21.4% from 45 to 64, and 15.5% who were 65 years of age or older. The median age was 36 years. For every 100 females, there were 93.5 males. For every 100 females age 18 and over, there were 90.5 males.

As of 2000, the median income for a household in the city was $41,157, and the median income for a family was $48,056. Males had a median income of $35,509 versus $22,885 for females. The per capita income for the city was $18,153. About 5.5% of families and 7.4% of the population were below the poverty line, including 8.1% of those under age 18 and 8.4% of those age 65 or over.

== Education ==
Elk Point Public Schools are part of the Elk Point-Jefferson School District (South Dakota). The school district has one elementary school, one middle school, and one high school. Students attend Elk Point-Jefferson High School.

== Notable person ==
- Chuck Tollefson, a football player for the Green Bay Packers.

== See also ==
- List of cities in South Dakota
