= List of places in South Dakota: A-L =

This list of current cities, towns, unincorporated communities, counties, and other recognized places in the U.S. state of South Dakota also includes information on the number and names of counties in which the place lies, and its lower and upper zip code bounds, if applicable.

Name of place	Number of counties	Principal county	Lower zip code	Upper zip code
Aberdeen (city)	1	Brown	57401	
Aberdeen Township	1	Brown		
Ahnberg	1	Brookings		
Alcester (city)	1	Union	57001	
Alcester Township	1	Union		
Alexandria	1	Hanson	57311	
Allen	1	Bennett	57714	
Alsen	1	Union		
Amherst	1	Marshall		
Antelope	1	Todd		
Arlington	2	Kingsbury	57212	
Armour	1	Douglas	57313	
Ashland Heights	1	Pennington		
Ashton	1	Spink	57424	
Aurora Center	1	Aurora	57375	
Aurora County	1	Aurora		
Avon	1	Bon Homme	57315	
Badlands National Park	2	Pennington		
Baltic	1	Minnehaha	57003	
Barnard	1	Brown	57426	
Bath	1	Brown	57427	
Beadle County	1	Beadle		
Belle Fourche	1	Butte	57717	
Bemis	1	Deuel		
Benclare	1	Minnehaha		
Bennett County	1	Bennett		
Beresford	2	Union	57004	
Big Sioux Township	1	Union		
Big Springs Township	1	Union		
Big Stone City	1	Grant	57216	
Blackhawk	1	Meade	57718	
Black Hills National Forest	4	Pennington		
Bloomingdale	1	Clay		
Blunt	1	Hughes	57522	
Bon Homme	1	Bon Homme		
Bonesteel	1	Gregory	57317	
Booge	1	Minnehaha		
Bowdle	1	Edmunds	57428	
Box Elder	2	Pennington	57719	
Brandon	1	Minnehaha	57005	
Brookings	1	Brookings	57006	07
Brookings County	1	Brookings		
Brown County	1	Brown		
Brule County	1	Brule		
Brule Township	1	Union		
Buffalo County	1	Buffalo		
Bullhead	1	Corson	57621	
Burbank	1	Clay	57010	
Butte County	1	Butte		
Campbell County	1	Campbell		
Canton	1	Lincoln	57013	
Centerville	1	Turner	57014	
Charles Mix County	1	Charles Mix		
Civil Bend Township	1	Union		
Clay County	1	Clay		
Codington County	1	Codington		
Aberdeen	1	Pennington		
Corson County	1	Corson		
Custer County	1	Custer		
Dakota Dunes	1	Union	57049	
Elk Point (city)	1	Union	57025	
Elk Point Township	1	Union		
Ellsworth Air Force Base	1	Meade		
Emmet (ghost town)	1	Union		
Emmet Township	1	Union		
Fort Thompson	1	Buffalo	57339	
Garryowen	1	Union		
Gothland (ghost town)	1	Union		
Green Grass	1	Dewey		
Green Valley	1	Pennington		
Hamill	1	Tripp	57534	
Hanna	1	Lawrence		
Harding County	1	Harding		
Harrison	1	Douglas		
Hill Side (ghost town)	1	Union		
Hughes County	1	Hughes		
Hutchinson County	1	Hutchinson		
Hyde County	1	Hyde		
Jackson County	1	Jackson		
Jefferson	1	Union	57038	
Jerauld County	1	Jerauld		
Jones County	1	Jones		
Kaylor	1	Hutchinson	57354	
Kingsbury County	1	Kingsbury		
Kyle	1	Oglala Lakota	57752	
La Plant	1	Dewey	57652	
Lake County County	1	Lake		
Lawrence County	1	Lawrence		
Lincoln County	1	Lincoln		
Little Eagle	1	Corson	57639	
Loomis	1	Davison	57301	
Lower Brule	1	Lyman	57548	
Lyman County	1	Lyman		

== See also ==
- List of cities in South Dakota
- List of counties in South Dakota
