= National Register of Historic Places listings in Union County, South Dakota =

Location of Union County in South Dakota

This is a list of the National Register of Historic Places listings in Union County, South Dakota.

This is intended to be a complete list of the properties and districts on the National Register of Historic Places in Union County, South Dakota, United States. The locations of National Register properties and districts for which the latitude and longitude coordinates are included below, may be seen in a map.

There are 16 properties and districts listed on the National Register in the county.

This National Park Service list is complete through NPS recent listings posted April 3, 2026.

== Current listings ==
	Name on the Register	Image	Date listed	Location	City or town	Description
1	Baker House	Baker House	August 7, 1979 (#79002409)	48113 SD Highway 48; 42°50′38″N 96°35′06″W	Alcester	
2	Governor William J. Bulow House	Governor William J. Bulow House	May 8, 1986 (#86001024)	207 W. Hemlock St. 43°04′53″N 96°46′35″W	Beresford	
3	Chicago and Northwestern Railroad Depot	Chicago and Northwestern Railroad Depot	January 31, 1985 (#85000262)	1 Depot Sq. 43°04′50″N 96°46′13″W	Beresford	
4	Hultgren Farm	Hultgren Farm	January 28, 2004 (#03001536)	47953 309th St. 42°54′15″N 96°37′00″W	Big Springs	
5	Hyden House	Hyden House	July 5, 1996 (#96000742)	405 Hyden House; 43°01′18″N 96°37′31″W	Alcester	
6	John August Larson Home	John August Larson Home	October 31, 1985 (#85003451)	407 W. Hemlock; 43°04′53″N 96°46′46″W	Beresford	
7	Junction City Rest Stop Tipi	Junction City Rest Stop Tipi	January 20, 2015 (#14001191)	Mi. 26.6 on I-29; 42°47′05″N 96°47′15″W	Junction City	Part of the Concrete Interstate Tipis of South Dakota MPS
8	Charles Murtha House and Brick Yard	Charles Murtha House and Brick Yard	February 1, 1982 (#82003945)	707 W. Main St. 42°41′26″N 96°41′32″W	Elk Point	
9	Nora Store	Nora Store	November 20, 2007 (#07001215)	30705 475th Ave. 42°56′25″N 96°42′25″W	Alcester	
10	J.W. Reedy House	J.W. Reedy House	December 13, 1984 (#84000605)	309 N. 2nd 43°05′01″N 96°46′21″W	Beresford	Summer kitchen/carriage house no longer extant as of March 2026.
11	St. Paul Lutheran Church and Cemetery	St. Paul Lutheran Church and Cemetery	February 20, 2018 (#100002103)	31903 475th Ave. 42°45′53″N 96°42′28″W	Richland vicinity	
12	St. Peter's Catholic Church	St. Peter's Catholic Church	July 19, 1989 (#89000833)	400 Main St. 42°36′15″N 96°33′37″W	Jefferson	
13	South Dakota Dept. of Transportation Bridge No. 64-061-199	South Dakota Dept. of Transportation Bridge No. 64-061-199	December 9, 1993 (#93001322)	Local road over Brule Creek; 42°47′39″N 96°41′08″W	Elk Point	
14	Star School District 61	Star School District 61	February 19, 2008 (#08000056)	47446 305th St. 42°58′06″N 96°43′02″W	Alcester	
15	Swanson House	Swanson House	May 31, 2006 (#06000461)	30572 483rd Ave. 42°57′22″N 96°32′50″W	Alcester	
16	United Brethren Church	United Brethren Church	February 9, 2001 (#01000091)	31141 476th Ave. 42°52′28″N 96°41′16″W	Spink	

== See also ==
- List of National Historic Landmarks in South Dakota
- National Register of Historic Places listings in South Dakota
