= List of places in South Dakota: M-Z =

This list of current cities, towns, unincorporated communities, counties, and other recognized places in the U.S. state of South Dakota also includes information on the number and names of counties in which the place lies, and its lower and upper zip code bounds, if applicable.

Name of place	Number of counties	Principal county	Lower zip code	Upper zip code
Madison	1	Lake County	57042	
Marshall County	1	Marshall County		
McCook County	1	McCook County		
McPherson County	1	McPherson County		
Meade County	1	Meade County		
Mellette County	1	Mellette County		
Milbank	1	Grant County	57252	53
Miller	1	Hand County	57362	
Miner County	1	Miner County		
Minnehaha County	1	Minnehaha County		
Mission	1	Todd County	57555	
Mitchell (city)	1	Davison County	57301	
Mitchell Township	1	Davison County		
Mobridge	1	Walworth County	57601	
Moody County	1	Moody County		
Nora	1	Union County		
North Sioux City	1	Union County		
Pennington County	1	Pennington County		
Perkins County	1	Perkins County		
Pierre	1	Hughes County	57501	
Potter County	1	Potter County		
Prairie Township	1	Union County		
Rapid City	1	Pennington County	57701	
Richland (city)	1	Union County		
Richland Township (unorganized)	1	Union County		
Roberts County	1	Roberts County		
Rockport Colony	1	Hanson County	57311	
Sanborn County	1	Sanborn County		
Shannon County	1	Shannon County		
Sioux Falls	1	Minnehaha County	57101	99
Sioux Valley Township	1	Union County		
Spearfish	1	Lawrence County	57783	99
Spink (village)	1	Union County		
Spink County	1	Spink County		
Spink Township	1	Union County		
St. Onge Township	1	Lawrence County		
Stanley County	1	Stanley County		
Sturgis	1	Meade County	57785	
Sully County	1	Sully County		
Swan Lake	1	Turner County		
Texas (ghost town)	1	Union County		
Todd County	1	Todd County		
Tripp County	1	Tripp County		
Turner County	1	Turner County		
Union County	1	Union County		
Vermillion	1	Clay County	57069	
Virginia Township	1	Union County		
Volga	1	Brookings County	57071	
Wagner	1	Charles Mix County	57361	80
Walworth County	1	Walworth County		
Watertown	1	Codington County	57201	
Webster	1	Day County	57274	
Winner	1	Tripp County	57580	
Worthing	1	Lincoln County	57077	
Yankton (city)	1	Yankton County	57078	79
Yankton County	1	Yankton County		
Zickrick Township	1	Jones County		
Ziebach County	1	Ziebach County		

== See also ==
- List of cities in South Dakota
- List of counties in South Dakota
