= South Dakota Highway 11 =

State highway in South Dakota, United States

Highway 11

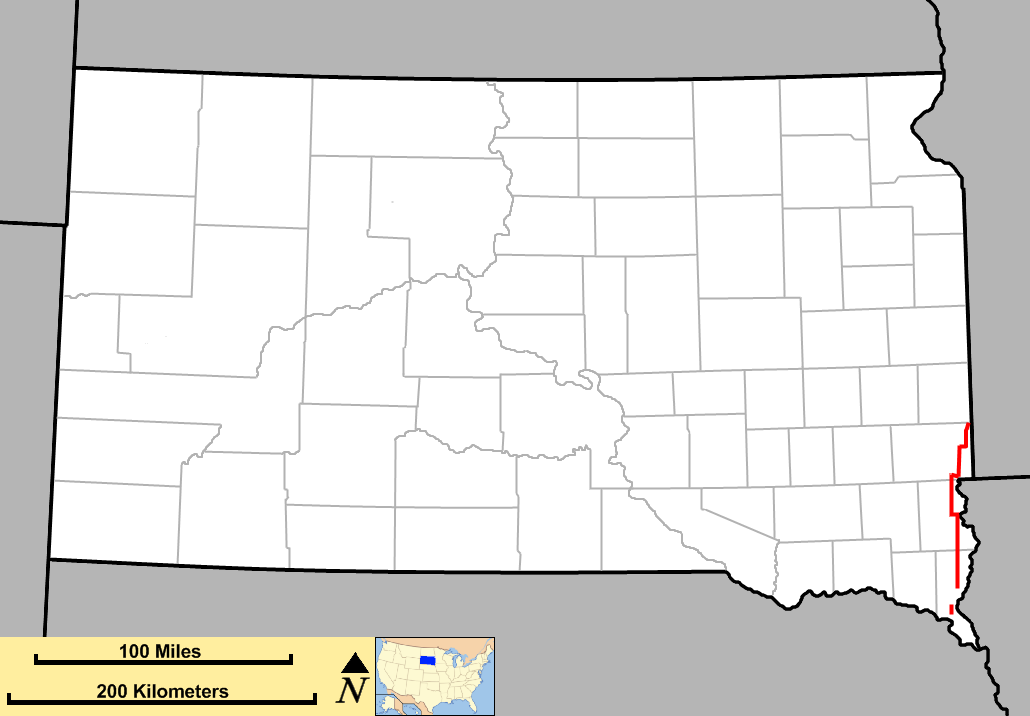
- Map of South Dakota with SD 11 in red

Route information
- Maintained by SDDOT
- Length: 77.724 mi (125.085 km)
- Existed: 1926–present

Southern segment
- Length: 5.046 mi (8.121 km)
- South end: South Franklin Street / East Rose Street in Elk Point
- North end: SD 50 near Richland

Northern segment
- Length: 72.678 mi (116.964 km)
- South end: SD 48 east of Spink
- Major intersections: SD 46 north of Alcester; US 18 west of Canton; SD 42 from Sioux Falls to east of Sioux Falls; I-90 north of Brandon
- North end: MN 269 at the Minnesota state line near Sherman

Location
- Country: United States
- State: South Dakota
- Counties: Union; Lincoln; Minnehaha

Highway system
- South Dakota State Trunk Highway System; Interstate; US; State
← SD 10	→ US 12

South Dakota Highway 11 (SD 11) is a 77.724-mile (125.085 km) state highway in eastern South Dakota, United States. It connects the northern part of the Sioux City metropolitan area with the Sioux Falls metropolitan area.

The highway originally traveled on the current path of SD 115 in Sioux Falls and Dell Rapids, and ended north of Elkton. In the 1930s, SD 11 was shifted to its current alignment; part of the highway became SD 13. The southern segment was added between 1962 and 1971. Part of the highway in Sioux Falls was changed in the early 1990s. The segment between SD 46 and US 18 was added in the 1990s.

== Route description ==
SD 11 is defined by South Dakota Codified Law §31-4-131. According to this statute, the segment of the road between SD 50 and SD 48 is currently not a portion of the highway. The segment of the highway in Sioux Falls from 85th Street through the concurrency with SD 42, as well as the segment from the Madison Street intersection to the interchange with I-90, are included in the National Highway System, a system of highways important to the nation's defense, economy, and mobility.

=== Southern segment ===
SD 11's southern segment begins in the south-central part of Union County, at an intersection with the northern terminus of South Franklin Street in the northwestern part of Elk Point. Here, the roadway continues to the southeast as East Rose Street. Both South Franklin Street and East Rose Street are signed as part of a "city truck route". SD 11 heads to the northwest and almost immediately curves to the north. Just south of 321st Street, it crosses over the Big Ditch. North of 320th Street, it intersects SD 50 west-northwest of Richland. This intersection is the northern terminus of the southern segment of SD 11 and the eastern terminus of County Road 25 (CR 25; 319th Avenue).

=== Northern segment ===
SD 11's northern segment begins in the east-central part of Union County, at an intersection with SD 48 east of Spink. Here, the roadway continues to the south as 479th Avenue. It travels to the north and crosses over West Union Creek between 310th and 309th streets. The highway enters Alcester, where it crosses over some railroad tracks of Union Pacific Railroad. It continues to the north. Starting at a point just south of 298th Street, it parallels part of East Brule Creek. Then, it intersects SD 46 (297th Street), where it enters the southeastern part of Lincoln County.

SD 11 travels through Norway Center at 294th Street and continues to the north. It travels through rural areas of the county and crosses over Little Beaver Creek between 285th and 284th streets. It continues northward and intersects U.S. Route 18 (US 18) west of Canton. The two highways begin a concurrency to the west. Here, the roadway continues to the north as 479th Avenue. Approximately 0.465 miles (0.748 km) later, SD 11 splits off to the north, with the roadway continuing to the south as 478th Avenue. Between US 18 and 281st Street, it crosses over some railroad tracks of BNSF Railway. Between 280th and 279th streets, it has a crossing over Beaver Creek. Just south of 277th Street, it crosses over some railroad tracks of BNSF Railway. Between 275th and 274th streets, it crosses over Ninemile Creek. Just north of 273rd Street, the highway passes the Lake Alvin State Recreation Area. Just north of 271st Street, it crosses over Spring Creek. It travels through Shindler and curves to the north-northwest. At an intersection with 57th Street, the highway enters the southeastern part of Minnehaha County and becomes a divided highway.

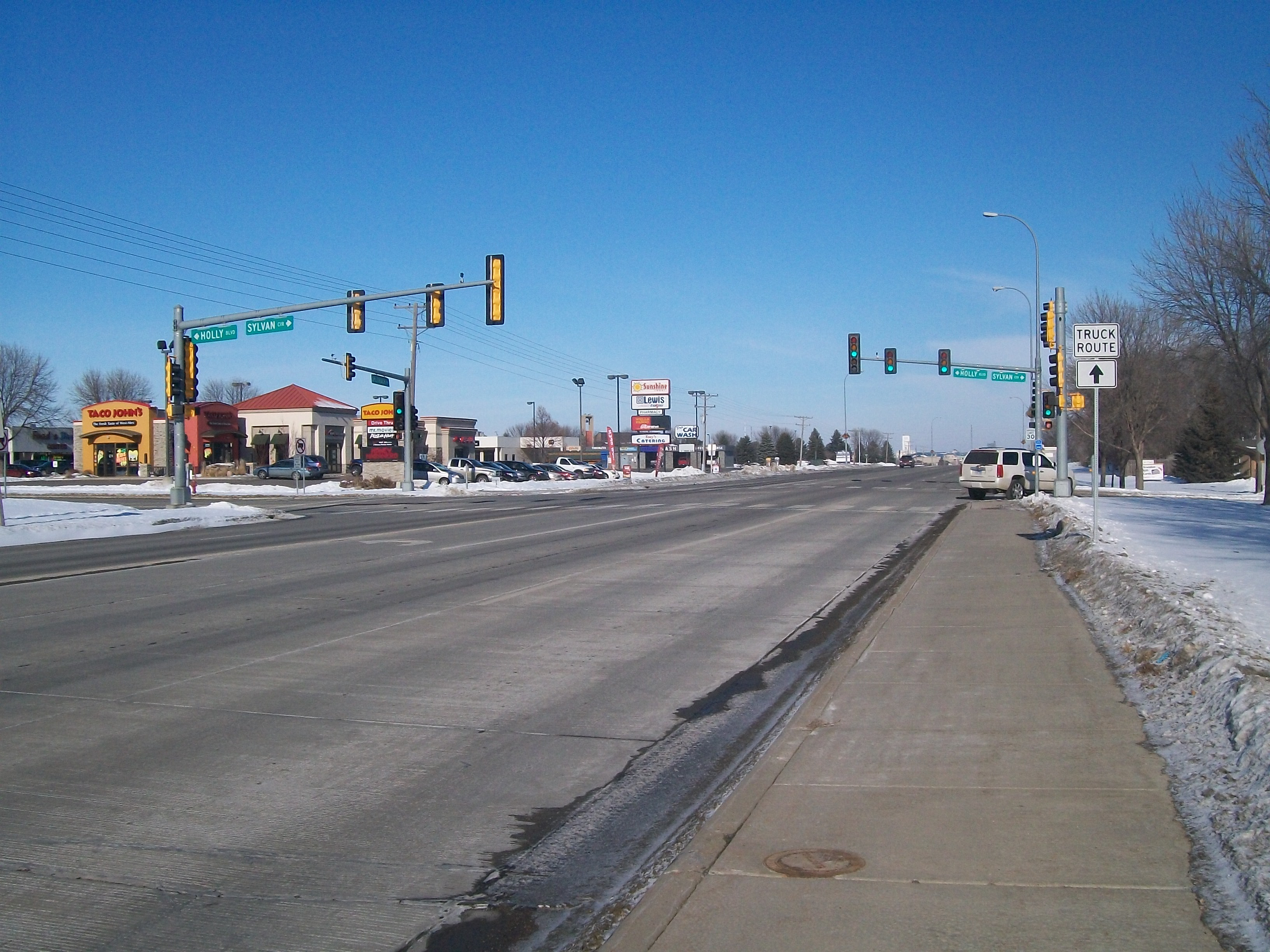
SD 11 intersects Holly Boulevard and Sylvan Circle in Brandon.

SD 11 skirts along the eastern part of Harmodon Park. It intersects 41st Street, which leads to the park entrance. The highway enters the city limits of Sioux Falls. North of Split Rock Road, the divided highway portion ends. Almost immediately, it intersects SD 42 (Arrowhead Parkway). Here, SD 11 and SD 42 begin a concurrency to the east. They curve to the southeast and pass the Willow Run Golf Course and Arrowhead Park. After curving to the east-southeast, they cross over the Big Sioux River. Less than 2,000 feet (610 m) later, they intersect the northern terminus of CR 142 (481st Avenue). Here, SD 11 splits off to the north. It then curves to the north-northeast. It crosses over Split Rock Creek and then enters Brandon. It travels just to the east of Aspen Park and then crosses over some railroad tracks of Union Pacific Railroad. On the northwestern edge of McHardy Park, SD 11 curves to the north. It passes the Brandon Valley High School between Cedar Street and Holly Boulevard. Just north of the city limits of Brandon is an interchange with Interstate 90 (I-90). The highway travels through Corson and crosses over some railroad tracks of BNSF Railway. It then has a second crossing of Split Rock Creek. Just north of 258th Street is a third crossing of this creek and then a crossing of West Pipestone Creek. Just south of 255th Street is a second crossing of this creek. The highway curves to the east and crosses this creek for a third time, just west of 483rd Avenue. It crosses over Split Rock Creek for a third time, just before entering the southwestern part of Garretson. It curves to the north and passes some sewage disposal ponds before crossing the Split Rock Creek again. Then, the highway leaves Garretson. Just south of 246th Street, the highway begins curving to the north-northeast. It crosses over Pipestone Creek and then curves to the east. At 244th Street, it begins to travel on the Minnehaha–Moody county line for the rest of its length. Just to the east of 486th Avenue, the highway curves to the east-northeast. Approximately 0.7 miles (1.1 km) east of 487th Avenue, the highway reaches the Minnesota state line. Here, SD 11 ends, and the roadway continues as Minnesota State Highway 269 (MN 269).

== History ==
The 1926 routing of the highway traveled on the current path of SD 115 in Sioux Falls and Dell Rapids, and ended at U.S. Route 14 (US 14) north of Elkton. In the 1930s, SD 11 was shifted to its current alignment between Sioux Falls and the Minnesota state line; the segment from south of Flandreau to north of Elkton became SD 13. The southern segment was added between 1962 and 1971. The alignment on the east side of Sioux Falls changed in early 1990s. The segment between SD 46 and US 18 was added in the 1990s.

== Major intersections ==
County	Location	mi	km	Destinations	Notes
Union	Elk Point	0.000	0.000	South Franklin Street south / East Rose Street south	Southern terminus of southern segment; roadway continues as East Rose Street
Union		5.046	8.121	SD 50 / 319th Avenue west – Junction City, Richland	Northern terminus of southern segment; eastern terminus of County Road 25 (CR 25; 319th Avenue)
Union	Gap in route				
Union		5.046	8.121	SD 48 / 479th Avenue south – I-29, Akron	Southern terminus of northern segment; roadway continues as 479th Avenue.
Union–Lincoln county line		21.194	34.108	SD 46 (297th Street) – Beresford, Hawarden	
Lincoln		36.580	58.870	US 18 east / 479th Avenue north – Canton	Southern end of US 18 concurrency; roadway continues as 479th Avenue.
Lincoln		36.580	58.870	US 18 west / 478th Avenue south – I-29	Northern end of US 18 concurrency; roadway continues as 478th Avenue
Minnehaha	Sioux Falls	50.036	80.525	SD 42 west (Arrowhead Parkway)	Southern end of SD 42 concurrency
Minnehaha		53.387	85.918	SD 42 east / 481st Avenue south – Rowena	Northern end of SD 42 concurrency; northern terminus of CR 142 (481st Avenue)
Minnehaha		56.068– 56.142	90.233– 90.352	I-90 – Sioux Falls, Luverne	I-90 exit 406
Minnehaha		77.724	125.085	MN 269 east – Jasper	Northern terminus; continuation into Minnesota
1.000 mi = 1.609 km; 1.000 km = 0.621 mi: Concurrency terminus

== See also ==
- List of state highways in South Dakota
