= St. Onge =

St. Onge or Saint Onge or variants thereof may refer to:

== Places ==
- St. Onge, Ontario (historic), Canada
- St. Onge Township, Lawrence County, South Dakota, U.S.
- Saint Onge, South Dakota, U.S.

== People ==
- Doug J. St. Onge (1934–2021), American politician
- Guylaine St-Onge (1965–2005), Canadian actress
- Keith St. Onge, American barefoot water skier

== See also ==
- Saintonge (disambiguation)
- Onge (disambiguation)
- Saintongeais dialect
- Saint-Genis-de-Saintonge, Charente-Maritime, France
