= Saintonge =

Saintonge may refer to:

- County of Saintonge, a historical province of France on the Atlantic coast
- Saintonge (region), a region of France corresponding to the historical province
- Saintonge ware, a medieval pottery type produced in Saintes region of France from the 13th century

== Places ==
- Saint-Genis-de-Saintonge, a commune in the Charente-Maritime department in southwestern France
- Rue de Saintonge, a street in Marais, Paris' 3rd arrondissement

== People ==
- Amélie Saintonge (born 1980), Canadian astrophysicist
- Jean-Pierre Saintonge (born 1945), Quebec, Canada educator, lawyer, judge and political figure
- Anne de Xainctonge or de Saintonge (1567–1621), founder of the Society of the Sisters of Saint Ursula of the Blessed Virgin, the first non-cloistered women's religious community

== Others ==
- Saintongese, people from Saintonge, an area in western France
- Saintonge Regiment, infantry regiments of France
- Saintonge War, a feudal dynastic encounter that occurred in 1242 and 1243 between forces of Louis IX of France, Alphonse of Poiters and those of Henry III of England, Hugh X of Lusignan, and Raymond VII of Toulouse

== See also ==
- Saintongeais dialect
- Saintongese (disambiguation)
- St. Onge (disambiguation)
- Onge (disambiguation)
