= Galena Schoolhouse =

- Galena School
- U.S. National Register of Historic Places
- Location within South Dakota Location within the United States
- Location: Block 13, Lots 1–5 Bryan Placer No. 913, Galena, South Dakota
- Coordinates: 44°19′42″N 103°38′48″W
- Area: less than one acre
- Built: 1882
- Built by: W.V. Doyle
- Architectural style: Queen Anne
- Website: www.galenaschoolhouse.org/index.htm
- MPS: Schools in South Dakota MPS
- NRHP reference No.: 99001435
- Added to NRHP: November 30, 1999

The Galena Schoolhouse, sometimes shortened to the Galena School, is a historic one-room schoolhouse in Galena, South Dakota, United States. It held classes from 1882 until its closure in 1943. Since 1983, it has been preserved by the Galena Historical Society. It was listed on the National Register of Historic Places in 1999.

== History ==
Galena was a mining settlement in the Black Hills of Lawrence County, South Dakota, established in 1878. Before the school was built, classes were first held in Delong Hall, a now-demolished meeting hall, and later in private residences. The schoolhouse was built by W.V. Doyle and a dedication ceremony was held on September 26, 1882. The 200-pound (91 kg) school bell was installed the following year. A flagpole was added outside in 1914 and electrical wiring was installed in the late 1920s. Two outhouses behind the school were built by the Works Progress Administration.

Galena's population fluctuated with the success and failure of the mines, but was on a steady decline as the 20th century progressed. Classes were discontinued in the spring of 1943 and all remaining students attended classes at nearby Chicken Ranch.

In 1983, the Lead-Deadwood School District, which then owned the building, planned to demolish the schoolhouse due to its deterioration. In response, local residents founded the Galena Historical Society that June to save and repair the schoolhouse. The district leased the schoolhouse to the historical society for an annual fee of $1 ($3.23 in 2025), until it took over ownership in 1997. On November 30, 1999, the schoolhouse was listed on the National Register of Historic Places as part of the Schools in South Dakota multiple property submission.

The Galena Historical Society hosts regular fundraisers and tours of the Galena Schoolhouse and the townsite.

== Architecture ==
The wood-frame schoolhouse consists of one room and measures 24 ft 10 in (7.57 m) by 40 ft 8 in (12.40 m). Its fieldstone foundation sits 5 feet (1.5 m) above the ground. The school itself has clapboard siding and a gable roof. A front porch shelters its main entrance on the east side, accessible by staircase. Inside, the ceiling is about 14 feet (4.3 m) high, and the room features original desks, a blackboard, and a cloakroom.

In 1988, the schoolhouse underwent extensive renovations, including repairs on the bell tower and restoration of one of the outhouses. A chimney was deemed to be too unstable and was removed.
