= Cole County =

Cole County may refer to:

- Cole County, Missouri
- Cole County, Dakota, the original name of Union County, South Dakota
