= Boulder Canyon =

Boulder Canyon may refer to:

== Places ==
- Boulder Canyon (Boulder Creek), the canyon of Boulder Creek (Colorado)
- Boulder Canyon (Colorado River), the Colorado River canyon above Hoover Dam flooded by Lake Mead
- Boulder Canyon, South Dakota, a census-designated place in the Black Hills
