= Galena, South Dakota =

Galena, South Dakota Galena City
- Unincorporated community
- Location in the U.S. state of South Dakota Galena (the United States)
- Coordinates: 44°20′01″N 103°38′28″W
- Country: United States
- State: South Dakota
- County: Lawrence
- Founded: c. 1876
- Elevation: 4,790 ft (1,460 m)
- Time zone: UTC-7 (Mountain (MST))
  - Summer (DST): UTC-6 (MDT)
- Area code: 605
- GNIS feature ID: 1265226

Galena (also Galena City) is an unincorporated community in Lawrence County, South Dakota, United States. It is often considered to be a ghost town, although a few families still live in the area. It is not tracked by the U.S. Census Bureau.

== Name ==
The town was named after the galena found in the ore in the surrounding mines.

== History ==
=== Early history and settling ===
In 1874, gold was discovered in the Black Hills and drew settlers to the area. The mines in the area were originally intended to be gold mines, but other metals were more plentiful in the hills. Most of the gold was found in trace amounts, while silver and lead ore were the most common metals in the area. In March 1876, a large number of people began to settle in the gulch where Galena was built and filed the first mining claims; most of these evolved into silver mines. A few of these first mines were called the Sitting Bull, Florence, Merritt, El Refugio, Emma, and Cora. At the summits of the surrounding hills, shaft mines were drilled, while further down the cliff, miners built tunnels. In September 1876, the Florence claim was bought by Robert Florman. The first houses were built out of dirt or wood. In October 1876, a settler named James Conzette built a cabin in Galena, which he planned to use as a fort against Native American raids, though it never served that purpose. It had a dirt floor and roof and a door constructed from a sluice box. The last Native American seen in the town was in 1876, when a small group climbed down the ravine to the southwest where the Catholic church was built.

=== Growth ===
To meet growing demands for lumber, a sawmill was built behind one of the town's stores. By June 1877, the town had a population between 150 and 200 and was growing rapidly. It included four stores, three butchers, a livery yard, and a boarding house. By July 4, the town had 250 men and 25 women. Around this time, Galena beat the nearby camps of Caribou and Hardscrabble in the election for the first post office. By the end of 1877, 400 people were living in Galena, and it had 75 homes and two smelters. A mail line was built from Deadwood to Galena and Virginia City.

The town later boasted a physician, assayer, notary, shoemaker, two hotels, two saloons, another livery yard, an opera house, a tin shop, and two more sawmills. Two railroad lines were built to Galena from Deadwood and sparked more growth. Three newspapers ran in the area: the Daily Times, the Pioneer, and the News. One July, a fire swept through the town and destroyed the opera house. In 1881, due to a very successful local mining operation, Galena experienced another period of growth. That year, the older cabins in the gulch were torn down due to their deteriorating states. The town then added a barber shop, a restaurant, and a hardware store. Two more hotels planned to enter town. Two more express lines were added from Deadwood, and a stagecoach line was built between Sturgis and Galena. A telephone line was also installed. The Galena Schoolhouse was built in 1882 and still stands today, maintained by the Galena Historical Society. This school, like others of its time, only ran for three months out of the year. One of the residents became well known in the area for his pet coyote named Tootsie.

=== Later history and present day ===
In 1883, a dispute evolved into a court case between two mining claims that reached the Supreme Court of Dakota Territory. The same year, a man named Patrick Gorman was killed and the case was brought to a trial, but the killer was let go when the jury ruled self-defense. These controversies eventually contributed to a decline in Galena's activity. In 1886, Galena experienced another period of activity as eight mining companies worked the land. From then until 1897, the town was very inactive. the Union Mining Company bought all of the surrounding mines, but within the year, the operations had failed. By 1902, Galena had been severely neglected. That same year, however, the Burlington Railroad came through. The economy started to increase again and the houses were repaired. However, the line was abandoned in 1912, and the railroad took up its tracks in 1929. In 1940, another mining company, the Gilt Edge Mines, came through and revived the town. The school closed in summer 1943.

A few families live in Galena, and there are a few vacation homes. The Galena Historical Society holds an annual Galena open house and walk, which opens up historical buildings on private property to visitors, including the schoolhouse.

== Geography ==
Galena is located in the northern Black Hills in Lawrence County, South Dakota. It has an elevation of 4,790 feet (1,460 m). Bear Butte Creek runs beside the town, which is located in a meadow in the middle of a gulch.

=== Climate ===
Climate data for Galena, SD
Month	Jan	Feb	Mar	Apr	May	Jun	Jul	Aug	Sep	Oct	Nov	Dec	Year
Record high °F (°C)	65 (18)	67 (19)	77 (25)	91 (33)	94 (34)	102 (39)	103 (39)	103 (39)	101 (38)	86 (30)	75 (24)	64 (18)	103 (39)
Mean daily maximum °F (°C)	38 (3)	39 (4)	46 (8)	55 (13)	65 (18)	75 (24)	83 (28)	81 (27)	71 (22)	58 (14)	45 (7)	36 (2)	58 (14)
Daily mean °F (°C)	26 (−3)	27 (−3)	34 (1)	42 (6)	52 (11)	62 (17)	69 (21)	67 (19)	57 (14)	45 (7)	33 (1)	25 (−4)	45 (7)
Mean daily minimum °F (°C)	14 (−10)	15 (−9)	21 (−6)	29 (−2)	38 (3)	48 (9)	55 (13)	53 (12)	43 (6)	32 (0)	21 (−6)	13 (−11)	32 (0)
Record low °F (°C)	−28 (−33)	−29 (−34)	−18 (−28)	−6 (−21)	4 (−16)	23 (−5)	32 (0)	27 (−3)	17 (−8)	−7 (−22)	−19 (−28)	−30 (−34)	−30 (−34)
Average precipitation inches (mm)	1.35 (34)	1.24 (31)	1.72 (44)	3.55 (90)	5.04 (128)	3.77 (96)	2.72 (69)	2.18 (55)	2.06 (52)	3.36 (85)	1.38 (35)	1.43 (36)	29.8 (755)
Source: The Weather Channel

== Notable person ==
- Sally A. Campbell, better known as "Aunt Sally," pioneer who travelled with George Custer and claimed to have been the first non-native woman in the Black Hills

== See also ==
- Roubaix, South Dakota
- Nemo, South Dakota
