= Saintongese =

Saintongese may refer to:

- People from Saintonge, an area in western France
- Saintongeais, the Romance language spoken in and around Saintonge

== See also ==
- Saintonge (disambiguation)
