= Rudie M. Saltness =

American politician and attorney

- 1941 portrait of Saltness

Member of the Minnesota House of Representatives
- In office January 7, 1940 – January 4, 1943

Personal details
- Born: January 19, 1899 Alcester, South Dakota
- Died: April 19, 1974 (aged 75) Dawson, Minnesota
- Party: Nonpartisan

Rudie M. "R.M." Saltness was an American politician and lawyer.

Saltness was born in Alcester, South Dakota, and graduated from Boyd High School in 1916. In 1925, he received his law degree from the Minnesota College of Law. He was the municipal and county attorney for Dawson, Minnesota and Lac qui Parle County respectively.

Saltness served as a part of the United States Armed Forces during World War I.

He served on the Minnesota House of Representatives for one term, from 1941 until 1943. He ran for a second term in 1942, but lost the election. Saltness also ran for a seat in the Minnesota Senate in 1946, but lost that election as well.

Saltness was married to his wife, Sadie, and they had three children. He was Lutheran and his funeral was held in Grace Lutheran Church in Dawson, Minnesota.
