= North Spearfish, South Dakota =

- Census-designated place
- Location in Lawrence County and the state of South Dakota
- Coordinates: 44°30′29″N 103°53′7″W
- Country: United States
- State: South Dakota
- County: Lawrence

Area
  - Total: 4.29 sq mi (11.10 km^{2})
  - Land: 4.29 sq mi (11.10 km^{2})
  - Water: 0 sq mi (0.00 km^{2})
- Elevation: 3,645 ft (1,111 m)

Population (2020)
  - Total: 2,366
  - Density: 552.2/sq mi (213.22/km^{2})
- Time zone: UTC−7 (Mountain (MST))
  - Summer (DST): UTC−6 (MDT)
- Area code: 605
- FIPS code: 46-45715
- GNIS feature ID: 2393154

North Spearfish is a census-designated place (CDP) in Lawrence County, South Dakota, United States. The population was 2,366 at the 2020 census.

== Geography ==
North Spearfish is located in northern Lawrence County at 44°30′29″N 103°53′7″W (44.507983, -103.885173), on the northwest side of the city of Spearfish, the largest community in the county. Interstate 90 runs along the northern edge of the CDP, with access from Exit 8 (McGuigan Road). I-90 leads southeast 50 miles (80 km) to Rapid City and west 90 miles (140 km) to Gillette, Wyoming. U.S. Route 85 departs from I-90 at the northeast corner of North Spearfish, leading north 10 miles (16 km) to Belle Fourche.

According to the United States Census Bureau, the North Spearfish CDP has a total area of 3.1 square miles (8.0 km^{2}), all land. The community drains northward via Higgins Gulch to Spearfish Creek, a north-flowing tributary of the Redwater River, which in turn is a northeast-flowing tributary of the Belle Fourche River, which runs east to the Missouri River.

== Demographics ==
Historical population
Census	Pop.	Note	%±
1990	2,274		—
2000	2,306		1.4%
2010	2,221		−3.7%
2020	2,366		6.5%
U.S. Decennial Census

At the 2000 census there were 2,306 people, 857 households, and 611 families living in the CDP. The population density was 556.2 inhabitants per square mile (214.8/km^{2}). There were 914 housing units at an average density of 220.5 per square mile (85.1/km^{2}). The racial makeup of the CDP was 96.96% White, 0.09% African American, 1.65% Native American, 0.17% Asian, 0.04% Pacific Islander, 0.09% from other races, and 1.00% from two or more races. Hispanic or Latino of any race were 1.17%. 37.2% were of German, 17.3% Norwegian and 7.5% English ancestry according to Census 2000.

Of the 857 households 37.9% had children under the age of 18 living with them, 58.9% were married couples living together, 8.3% had a female householder with no husband present, and 28.7% were non-families. 20.4% of households were one person and 4.6% were one person aged 65 or older. The average household size was 2.61 and the average family size was 3.04.

The age distribution was 26.8% under the age of 18, 11.7% from 18 to 24, 26.2% from 25 to 44, 24.1% from 45 to 64, and 11.3% 65 or older. The median age was 35 years. For every 100 females, there were 97.9 males. For every 100 females age 18 and over, there were 97.3 males.

The median household income was $35,750 and the median family income was $40,455. Males had a median income of $29,559 versus $19,970 for females. The per capita income for the CDP was $16,865. About 7.7% of families and 10.7% of the population were below the poverty line, including 7.3% of those under age 18 and 4.8% of those age 65 or over.

== Education ==
It is in the Spearfish School District 40-2.
