= Mountain Plains, South Dakota =

- Census-designated place
- Location within South Dakota Location within the United States
- Coordinates: 44°28′13″N 103°51′57″W
- Country: United States
- State: South Dakota
- County: Lawrence

Area
  - Total: 1.59 sq mi (4.13 km^{2})
  - Land: 1.59 sq mi (4.13 km^{2})
  - Water: 0 sq mi (0.00 km^{2})
- Elevation: 4,278 ft (1,304 m)

Population (2020)
  - Total: 327
  - Density: 205.1/sq mi (79.18/km^{2})
- Time zone: UTC-7 (Mountain (MST))
  - Summer (DST): UTC-6 (MDT)
- ZIP Code: 57783 (Spearfish)
- Area code: 605
- FIPS code: 46-44032
- GNIS feature ID: 2804706

Mountain Plains is an unincorporated area and census-designated place (CDP) in Lawrence County, South Dakota, United States. The population was 327 at the 2020 census. It was first listed as a CDP prior to the 2020 census.

It is in the northern part of the county, on the northern edge of the Black Hills. It is bordered to the north by the city of Spearfish. U.S. Route 14A forms the eastern edge of the CDP, following the canyon of Spearfish Creek.

== Demographics ==
Historical population
Census	Pop.	Note	%±
2020	327		—
U.S. Decennial Census

== Education ==
It is in the Spearfish School District 40-2.
