= Shindler, South Dakota =

- Census-designated place
- Location in South Dakota Location in the United States
- Coordinates: 43°27′53″N 96°37′35″W
- Country: United States
- State: South Dakota
- County: Lincoln

Area
  - Total: 1.50 sq mi (3.89 km^{2})
  - Land: 1.50 sq mi (3.89 km^{2})
  - Water: 0 sq mi (0.00 km^{2})
- Elevation: 1,375 ft (419 m)

Population (2020)
  - Total: 607
  - Density: 404.2/sq mi (156.05/km^{2})
- Time zone: UTC-6 (Central (CST))
  - Summer (DST): UTC-5 (CDT)
- ZIP code: 57106
- FIPS code: 46-58590
- GNIS feature ID: 2584568

Shindler is an unincorporated community and census-designated place (CDP) in Lincoln County, South Dakota, United States. The population was 607 at the 2020 census.

== History ==
The community has the name of Charles Shindler, a settler.

== Geography ==
Shindler is located in the northeastern corner of Lincoln County and is approximately 8 miles (13 km) southeast of the center of Sioux Falls along South Dakota Highway 11. It is 15 miles (24 km) north of Canton, the Lincoln county seat, and 3 miles (5 km) west of the Big Sioux River, which forms the Iowa state line.

According to the U.S. Census Bureau, the Shindler CDP has an area of 1.5 square miles (3.9 km^{2}), all land. Spring Creek flows eastward through the southern part of the CDP, leading to the Big Sioux River.

== Demographics ==
Historical population
Census	Pop.	Note	%±
2020	607		—
U.S. Decennial Census
