= South Dakota Highway 48 =

State highway in South Dakota, US

Highway 48

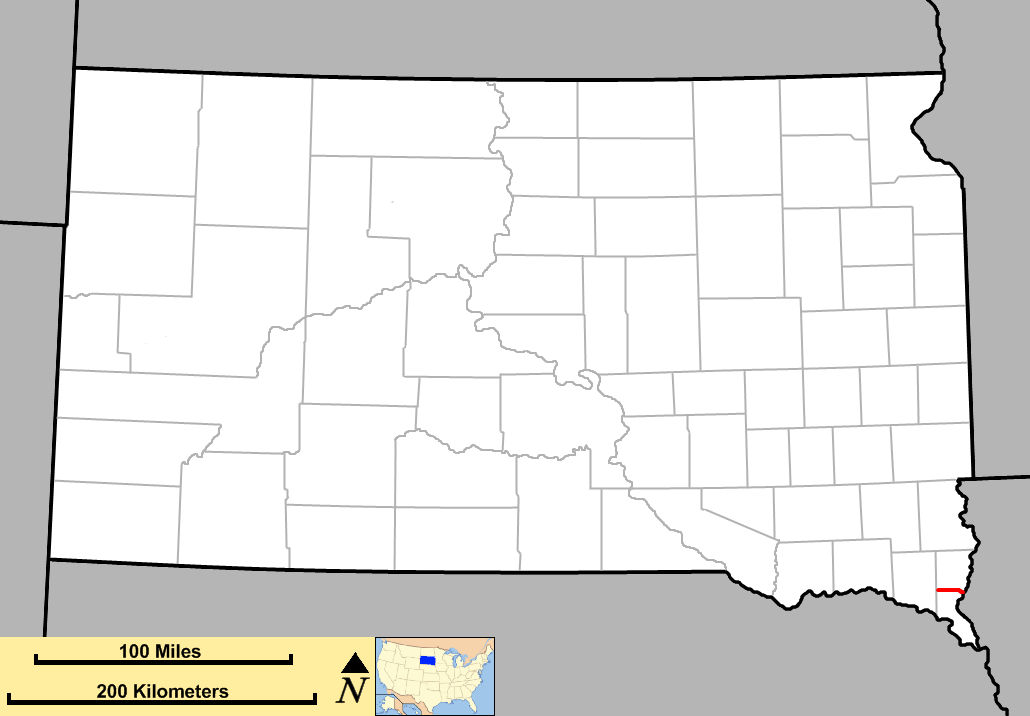
- Route of SD 48 (in red)

Route information
- Maintained by SDDOT
- Length: 12.462 mi (20.056 km)
- Existed: Circa 1950–present

Major junctions
- West end: I-29 east of Spink
- East end: Iowa state line west of Akron, IA

Location
- Country: United States
- State: South Dakota

Highway system
- South Dakota State Trunk Highway System; Interstate; US; State
← SD 47W	→ SD 49

South Dakota Highway 48 (SD 48) is a 12.462-mile (20.056 km) state highway in Union County, South Dakota, United States, that begins at Interstate 29, about 2.5 miles (4.0 km) west of Spink, and becomes Big Sioux River Road, formerly Iowa Highway 403, northwest of Akron, Iowa.

== Route description ==
SD 48 begins at a diamond interchange on I‑29 Exit 31, approximately 44 miles (71 km) south of Sioux Falls. From its western terminus, SD 48 travels due east. It nearly immediately meets County Road 1C (CR 1C), an old alignment of US 77. Two miles (3.2 km) east of the CR 1C intersection, SD 48 passes through the town of Spink.

East of Spink, SD 48 gently curves to the north as it descends a rolling hill towards Brule Creek. After crossing the stream, the highway ascends, bending back to the south to resume its due east course. Over the next several miles, the road remains arrow-straight while traversing gently rolling farmland. Just under 10 miles (16 km) east of I‑29, SD 48 serves as the southern terminus of Highway 11 (SD 11). About 1/3 mile (0.54 km) from the SD 11 junction, SD 48 crosses a bridge over West Union Creek; one mile (1.6 km) later, it crosses East Union Creek. For the remainder of the route, the road gradually S-curves southwest into the Big Sioux River valley. At the Big Sioux River, the road crosses the Iowa state line and ends.

== History ==
South Dakota 48 was established on a previously unnumbered highway between 1948 and 1953. It began at U.S. Highway 77 (current Union County Road 1C). No significant changes have been made, except for a slight extension to meet Interstate 29 to the west, and a slight realignment at the Iowa border.

== Major intersections ==
The entire route is in Union County.

Location	mi	km	Destinations	Notes
	0.000	0.000	I-29	I-29 exit 31
	9.891	15.918	SD 11	
Big Sioux River	12.462	20.056	South Dakota–Iowa state line	
Big Sioux River	12.462	20.056	Big Sioux River Road to Iowa 12	Continuation into Iowa
1.000 mi = 1.609 km; 1.000 km = 0.621 mi

== See also ==
- List of state highways in South Dakota
