= Corson, South Dakota =

Corson
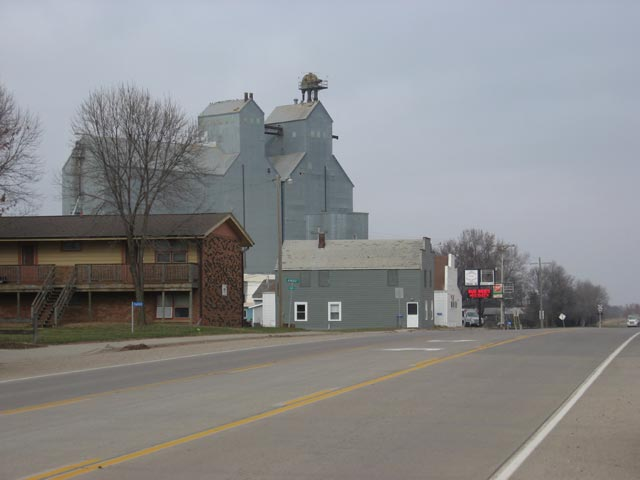
- South Dakota Highway 11 running northbound through Corson
- Interactive map of Corson
- Coordinates: 43°36′59″N 96°34′18″W
- Country: United States
- State: South Dakota
- County: Minnehaha
- Township: Brandon
- Elevation: 1,362 ft (415 m)

Population (2010)
  - Total: 70
- Time zone: UTC-6 (Central (CST))
  - Summer (DST): UTC-5 (CDT)
- GNIS feature ID: 1254471

Corson is an unincorporated community in Brandon Township, Minnehaha County, South Dakota, United States with a population of 70. It lies immediately north of Interstate 90 and Brandon on South Dakota Highway 11. Once mainly a railroad and farming community, it is becoming an industrial area supporting the county. Sioux Falls is located 12 miles (19 km) west-southwest of the community. It is served by the BNSF Railway Company.

== Etymology ==
Corson is named for Henry Tabor Corson (1838–1914), a resident of Sioux Falls, South Dakota, instrumental in constructing the Willmar and Sioux Falls Railway into Sioux Falls.

== Transportation ==
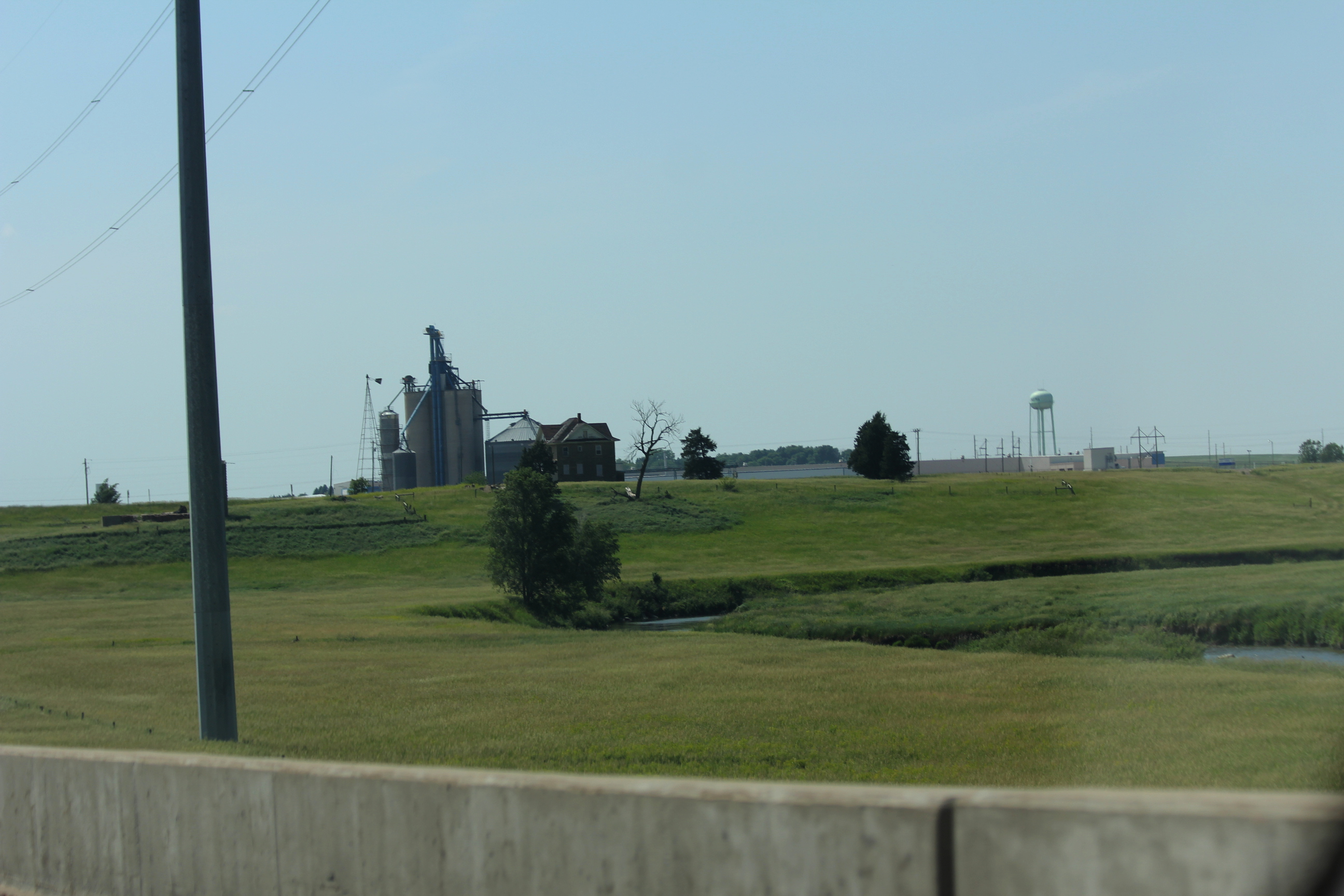
Corson from Interstate 90

Interstate 90 is the town's major east–west route, and it connects the community to Sioux Falls. South Dakota Highway 11 (SD 11) runs as the major north–south route through the area. SD 11 connects Corson to nearby Brandon and Garretson.
