= Onge (disambiguation) =

The Onge are an indigenous ethnic group of the Andaman Islands, India.

Onge may also refer to:

- Onge language, their Ongan (Andamanese) language
- Jarawa-Onge languages or Ongan languages, a subfamily of languages within the Andamanese group
- Ong (surname) or Onge, an English surname

== See also ==
- St. Onge (disambiguation)
- Saintonge (disambiguation)
