= Crook City, South Dakota =

Coordinates: 44°26′29″N 103°38′01″W

Crook City (also known as Camp Crook II or simply Crook) is a populated place in Lawrence County, South Dakota, United States. The population was 132 at the 2020 census. It became a census-designated place prior to the 2020 census.

Crook City was named for General George Crook's 1876 camp there. Nearby and between Deadwood and Sturgis is Crook Mountain, also named for him.

== Education ==
It is mostly in Spearfish School District 40-2, and partially in the Meade School District 46-1.

== See also ==
- Whitewood, South Dakota
