= Chinatown, South Dakota =

Coordinates: 44°22′45″N 103°43′17″W

Chinatown is a populated place in Lawrence County, South Dakota, United States. The name was entered into GNIS on January 1, 1990.

== See also ==
- Deadwood, South Dakota
