= Emmet, South Dakota =

- Unincorporated place
- Interactive map of Emmet, South Dakota
- Coordinates: 42°58′58″N 96°44′46″W
- Country: United States
- State: South Dakota
- County: Union

Area
  - Total: 35.9 sq mi (93.1 km^{2})
  - Land: 35.9 sq mi (93.1 km^{2})
  - Water: 0 sq mi (0.0 km^{2})
- Elevation: 1,299 ft (396 m)

Population (2000)
  - Total: 257
  - Density: 7.3/sq mi (2.8/km^{2})
- Time zone: UTC-6 (Central (CST))
  - Summer (DST): UTC-5 (CDT)
- ZIP code: 57004
- Area code: 605
- FIPS code: 46-19500
- GNIS feature ID: 1261002

Emmet is a ghost town in Emmet Township, Union County, South Dakota, United States.

== Geography ==
Emmet has been assigned the ZIP code 57004, and the FIPS place code 19510.

== History ==
The Emmet community started as early as 1871. The area was settled by an Irish-German colony, originating from Galena, Illinois. The community once had a general store, Emmet Hall, and St. Joseph's Catholic Church.

Eventually, the railroads passed through larger towns, causing populations and businesses in smaller communities such as Emmet to move away. Today, the only physical remnant of the Emmet community is the parsonage and the St. Joseph Cemetery, which surrounds the site where the old Catholic church once stood. This cemetery is still commonly known as the Emmet Cemetery.

The old Emmet Hall building (also known as Forrester's Hall) stood for a few decades. It was located approximately half a mile north and two miles west of the St. Joseph Cemetery. The multisided building was best known as the place where Lawrence Welk and his band once performed. After the 1950s, the building was no longer used as a dance hall and was converted for farm use. Two large sliding doors were added to the building's west side; and, the building was reported to have been used to store grain and to house sheep. The demolition of the building was reported to have occurred in November 2015.
