= Hudson, South Dakota =

- Town
- Location in Lincoln County and the state of South Dakota
- Coordinates: 43°07′48″N 96°27′20″W
- Country: United States
- State: South Dakota
- County: Lincoln
- Settled: 1868

Area
  - Total: 0.28 sq mi (0.73 km^{2})
  - Land: 0.28 sq mi (0.73 km^{2})
  - Water: 0 sq mi (0.00 km^{2})
- Elevation: 1,221 ft (372 m)

Population (2020)
  - Total: 311
  - Density: 1,102.6/sq mi (425.72/km^{2})
- Time zone: UTC-6 (Central (CST))
  - Summer (DST): UTC-5 (CDT)
- ZIP code: 57034
- Area code: 605
- FIPS code: 46-30740
- GNIS feature ID: 1267430

Hudson is a town in Lincoln County, South Dakota, United States. The population was 311 at the 2020 census. It is the easternmost community in South Dakota.

The town takes its name from Hudson, Iowa, the native home of a large share of the early settlers.

== Geography ==
According to the United States Census Bureau, the town has a total area of 0.28 square miles (0.73 km^{2}), all land.

== Demographics ==
Historical population
Census	Pop.	Note	%±
1880	88		—
1890	202		129.5%
1900	400		98.0%
1910	404		1.0%
1920	470		16.3%
1930	478		1.7%
1940	478		0.0%
1950	500		4.6%
1960	455		−9.0%
1970	366		−19.6%
1980	388		6.0%
1990	332		−14.4%
2000	402		21.1%
2010	296		−26.4%
2020	311		5.1%
U.S. Decennial Census; 2015 Estimate

=== 2010 census ===
As of the census of 2010, there were 296 people, 126 households, and 70 families residing in the town. The population density was 1,057.1 inhabitants per square mile (408.1/km^{2}). There were 150 housing units at an average density of 535.7 per square mile (206.8/km^{2}). The racial makeup of the town was 98.3% White, 1.0% Native American, and 0.7% from two or more races.

There were 126 households, of which 19.8% had children under the age of 18 living with them, 49.2% were married couples living together, 4.0% had a female householder with no husband present, 2.4% had a male householder with no wife present, and 44.4% were non-families. 37.3% of all households were made up of individuals, and 20.6% had someone living alone who was 65 years of age or older. The average household size was 2.07 and the average family size was 2.74.

The median age in the town was 47.7 years. 13.5% of residents were under the age of 18; 9.8% were between the ages of 18 and 24; 21% were from 25 to 44; 28.7% were from 45 to 64; and 27% were 65 years of age or older. The gender makeup of the town was 53.7% male and 46.3% female.

=== 2000 census ===
As of the census of 2000, there were 402 people, 146 households, and 93 families residing in the town. The population density was 1,505.5 inhabitants per square mile (581.3/km^{2}). There were 162 housing units at an average density of 606.7 per square mile (234.2/km^{2}). The racial makeup of the town was 98.01% White, 1.49% Native American, and 0.50% from two or more races. Hispanic or Latino of any race were 1.00% of the population.

There were 146 households, out of which 33.6% had children under the age of 18 living with them, 56.2% were married couples living together, 6.8% had a female householder with no husband present, and 36.3% were non-families. 29.5% of all households were made up of individuals, and 17.1% had someone living alone who was 65 years of age or older. The average household size was 2.56 and the average family size was 3.22.

In the town, the population was spread out, with 29.9% under the age of 18, 6.0% from 18 to 24, 25.6% from 25 to 44, 19.7% from 45 to 64, and 18.9% who were 65 years of age or older. The median age was 37 years. For every 100 females, there were 87.9 males. For every 100 females age 18 and over, there were 89.3 males.

The median income for a household in the town was $36,250, and the median income for a family was $44,792. Males had a median income of $30,469 versus $21,607 for females. The per capita income for the town was $16,339. About 1.9% of families and 4.0% of the population were below the poverty line, including 2.3% of those under age 18 and 4.3% of those age 65 or over.

== Education ==
Alcester-Hudson High School is the only high school in the Alcester-Hudson School District.
