= Alcester-Hudson High School =

Location
- 409 East 6th Street; Alcester, SD 57001; United States; 43.02466098568542°N 96.62375283830032°W

Information
- Type: Public
- School district: Alcester-Hudson School District 61-1
- Principal: Jason Van Engen
- Head of school: Tim Rhead, Superentendent
- Staff: 8.96 (FTE)
- Grades: 9-12
- Enrollment: 111 (2023-2024)
- Student to teacher ratio: 12.39
- Colors: Royal blue and gold
- Athletics: Basketball, cross country, football, golf, track, volleyball, and wrestling
- Athletics conference: Tri-Valley Conference
- Mascot: Cubs
- Newspaper: Bear Facts
- School Song: Original
- Website: www.alcester-hudson.k12.sd.us/schools/hs/index.cfm

Alcester-Hudson High School is the main secondary school for grades 9-12 located in Alcester, South Dakota. The high school serves the cities of Alcester, South Dakota and Hudson, South Dakota.

== History ==
The first students graduated from the Alcester's full high school in May 1911. The graduating class consisted of two girls, Ethel Johnson and Myra Weed.

Alcester-Hudson High School was formed when Alcester High School of Alcester, South Dakota was merged with Hudson High School of Hudson, South Dakota.

== School leadership ==
- Tim Rhead, K-6 Principal, District Superintendent
- Natalie Stene, Business Manager
- Jason Van Engen, 7-12 Principal

== Sports ==
The school offers students the ability to play in girls & boys basketball, volleyball, football, wrestling, golf and girls & boys track.
