= Englewood, South Dakota =

Unincorporated community in South Dakota, U.S.

Coordinates: 44°17′49″N 103°47′05″W

Englewood is an unincorporated community in Lawrence County, in the U.S. state of South Dakota.

== History ==
Englewood was first called Ten-Mile Ranch. It was originally a stagecoach stop in the late 1870s, and the name changed when it became a railroad center. A post office called Englewood was established in 1892, and remained in operation until 1943. The community most likely was named after Englewood, Chicago.
