= Boulder Canyon, South Dakota =

- Census-designated place
- Location within South Dakota Location within the United States
- Coordinates: 44°23′47″N 103°36′6″W
- Country: United States
- State: South Dakota
- County: Lawrence

Area
  - Total: 3.06 sq mi (7.92 km^{2})
  - Land: 3.06 sq mi (7.92 km^{2})
  - Water: 0 sq mi (0.00 km^{2})
- Elevation: 4,039 ft (1,231 m)

Population (2020)
  - Total: 561
  - Density: 183.4/sq mi (70.82/km^{2})
- Time zone: UTC-7 (Mountain (MST))
  - Summer (DST): UTC-6 (MDT)
- ZIP Code: 57785 (Sturgis)
- Area code: 605
- FIPS code: 46-06440
- GNIS feature ID: 2807111

Boulder Canyon is an unincorporated area and census-designated place (CDP) in Lawrence County, South Dakota, United States. The population was 561 at the 2020 census. It was first listed as a CDP prior to the 2020 census.

It is in the eastern part of the county, on the northern edge of the Black Hills. It sits at the head of Boulder Canyon, formed by Bear Butte Creek, which drains northeast to the Great Plains. U.S. Route 14A runs through the community, leading northeast down the canyon 6 miles (10 km) to Sturgis and west 7 miles (11 km) to Deadwood.

== Demographics ==
Historical population
Census	Pop.	Note	%±
2020	561		—
U.S. Decennial Census

== Education ==
It is in the Meade School District 46-1.
