= Alsen, South Dakota =

Alsen
- Unincorporated community
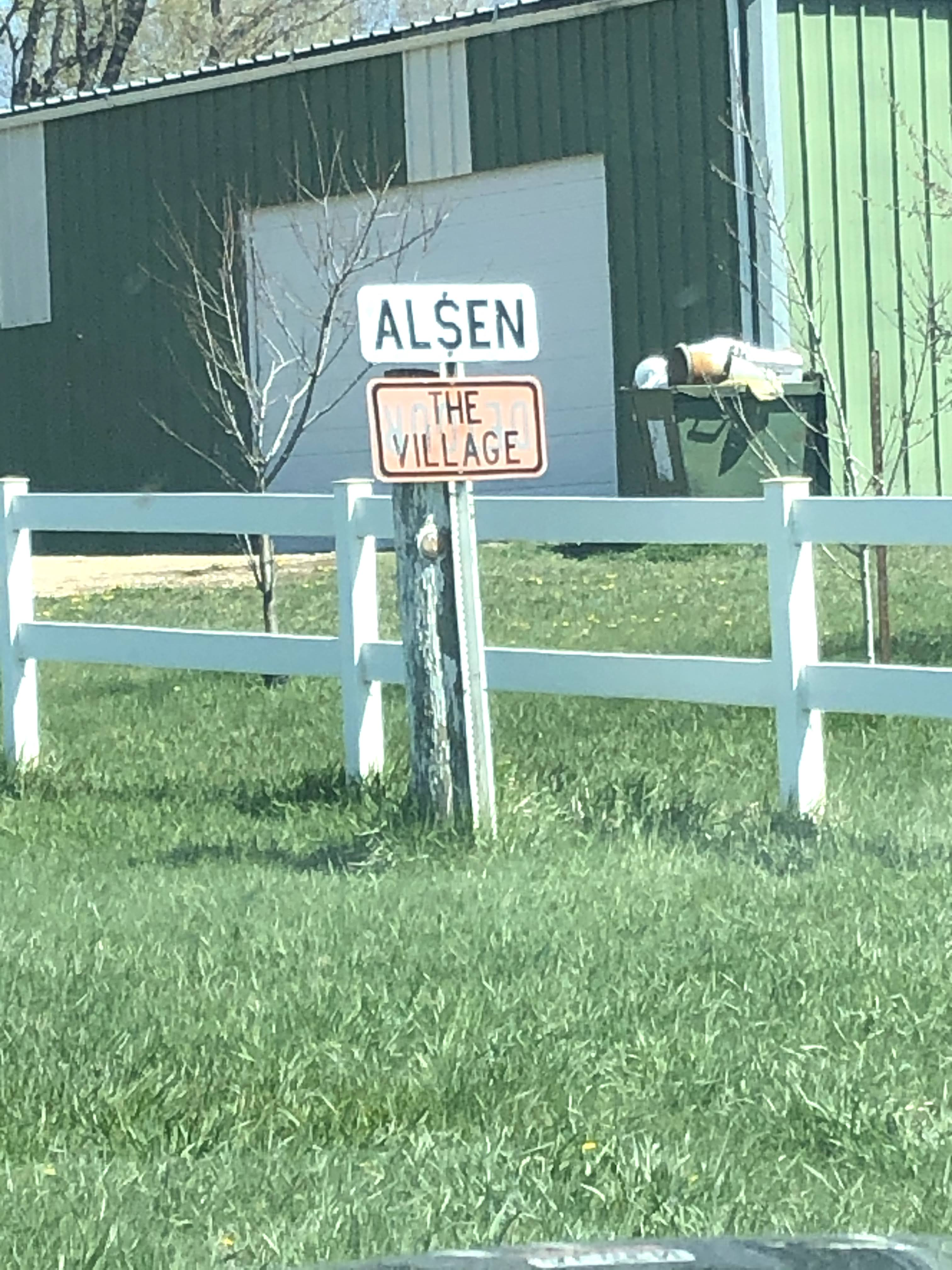
- White sign with black text saying "ALSEN", with a smaller sign below it saying "The Village"

- Location within the state of South Dakota Alsen (the United States)
- Coordinates: 42°57′40″N 96°48′20″W
- Country: United States
- State: South Dakota
- County: Union
- Elevation: 1,339 ft (408 m)
- Time zone: UTC-6 (Central (CST))
  - Summer (DST): UTC-5 (CDT)
- GNIS feature ID: 1260973

Alsen is an unincorporated community in Union County, South Dakota, United States. It is located nine miles southwest of Beresford and is on the border between Clay and Union counties.

== History ==
Alsen was named by Olof Erickson in honor of his birthplace, Alsen Parish, Jamtland District, Sweden. Erickson was an early homesteader as well as the town's first blacksmith. Alsen started when Erickson established his blacksmith shop in 1871. Erickson established the Alsen post office in 1874 and served as its first postmaster. The post office was closed in 1900.

During its early days, Alsen had a creamery, a general store, a telephone exchange, a harness shop, a blacksmith shop, and a Model T garage. The creamery closed in 1933. The garage was sold in 1938. Part of the Alsen store was remodeled into living quarters in 1948. The telephone exchange was the Alsen Community Telephone Company, a cooperative serving rural customers in Clay and Union Counties. It was one of the first exchanges to switch from operators to dial telephones in 1952, and again early in switching to all push-button calling in 1965. It was sold to Dakota Cooperative Telephone Company, Inc. in 1970 but the exchange still operates with a 253 prefix and maintains equipment in Alsen.
