= Hanna, South Dakota =

- Unincorporated community
- Location in the U.S. state of South Dakota
- Coordinates: 44°15′42″N 103°50′41″W
- Country: United States
- State: South Dakota
- County: Lawrence
- Elevation: 5,669 ft (1,728 m)
- Time zone: UTC-7 (Mountain (MST))
  - Summer (DST): UTC-6 (MDT)
- Area code: 605
- GNIS feature ID: 1261765

Hanna is a small unincorporated community in Lawrence County, South Dakota, United States. It is located along the Hanna Road in the Black Hills of South Dakota. The small settlement or village is south of the Hanna Campground and west-southwest of the Lead Country Club. The community is located about twelve miles southwest of Lead, South Dakota.

== History ==
Hanna was founded in 1904. It was named in honor of a United States Senator, Marc Hanna of Ohio, who died shortly before the community was founded. At one time, a branch of the Chicago, Burlington & Quincy Railroad ran through the town. The community now contains a pumping station for the Homestake Mine.

== Geography ==
Hanna is located at (44.261667, -103.844722).

=== Climate ===
North Rapid Creek is a SNOTEL weather station roughly 4.5 miles (7.2 km) south of Hanna, located near Buskala Historic Ranch.

Climate data for North Rapid Creek, South Dakota, 1997–2020 normals, 1989-1997 snowfall: 6130ft (1868m)
Month	Jan	Feb	Mar	Apr	May	Jun	Jul	Aug	Sep	Oct	Nov	Dec	Year
Mean daily maximum °F (°C)	35.0 (1.7)	35.5 (1.9)	44.5 (6.9)	49.8 (9.9)	58.3 (14.6)	69.0 (20.6)	77.3 (25.2)	75.5 (24.2)	67.2 (19.6)	52.3 (11.3)	42.7 (5.9)	34.0 (1.1)	53.4 (11.9)
Daily mean °F (°C)	25.6 (−3.6)	24.8 (−4.0)	33.1 (0.6)	38.6 (3.7)	47.0 (8.3)	56.6 (13.7)	64.2 (17.9)	62.2 (16.8)	54.6 (12.6)	41.9 (5.5)	33.0 (0.6)	25.0 (−3.9)	42.2 (5.7)
Mean daily minimum °F (°C)	16.1 (−8.8)	14.2 (−9.9)	21.8 (−5.7)	27.4 (−2.6)	35.8 (2.1)	44.2 (6.8)	51.0 (10.6)	48.9 (9.4)	41.9 (5.5)	31.6 (−0.2)	23.4 (−4.8)	16.0 (−8.9)	31.0 (−0.5)
Average precipitation inches (mm)	1.38 (35)	1.34 (34)	1.52 (39)	2.61 (66)	4.02 (102)	3.43 (87)	2.96 (75)	2.00 (51)	1.58 (40)	2.29 (58)	1.49 (38)	1.25 (32)	25.87 (657)
Average snowfall inches (cm)	27.5 (70)	23.6 (60)	25.1 (64)	38.5 (98)	4.4 (11)	0.8 (2.0)	0.0 (0.0)	0.0 (0.0)	2.1 (5.3)	16.2 (41)	25.2 (64)	31.5 (80)	194.9 (495.3)
Source 1: XMACIS2 (temperature normals & Buskala Ranch snowfall)
Source 2: NOAA (Precipitation)

Climate data for Hanna, SD
Month	Jan	Feb	Mar	Apr	May	Jun	Jul	Aug	Sep	Oct	Nov	Dec	Year
Record high °F (°C)	69 (21)	66 (19)	74 (23)	84 (29)	88 (31)	96 (36)	99 (37)	98 (37)	96 (36)	84 (29)	74 (23)	65 (18)	99 (37)
Mean daily maximum °F (°C)	36 (2)	37 (3)	43 (6)	52 (11)	61 (16)	71 (22)	79 (26)	78 (26)	68 (20)	55 (13)	43 (6)	35 (2)	55 (13)
Daily mean °F (°C)	27 (−3)	28 (−2)	33 (1)	42 (6)	51 (11)	60 (16)	68 (20)	67 (19)	57 (14)	45 (7)	34 (1)	26 (−3)	45 (7)
Mean daily minimum °F (°C)	17 (−8)	18 (−8)	23 (−5)	31 (−1)	40 (4)	49 (9)	56 (13)	55 (13)	45 (7)	34 (1)	24 (−4)	16 (−9)	34 (1)
Record low °F (°C)	−27 (−33)	−32 (−36)	−17 (−27)	−5 (−21)	9 (−13)	24 (−4)	36 (2)	22 (−6)	15 (−9)	−5 (−21)	−16 (−27)	−33 (−36)	−33 (−36)
Average precipitation inches (mm)	1.34 (34)	1.65 (42)	2.58 (66)	3.55 (90)	4.64 (118)	3.57 (91)	2.76 (70)	2.09 (53)	1.99 (51)	3.04 (77)	1.83 (46)	1.51 (38)	30.55 (776)
Source: The Weather Channel (Historical Monthly Averages)
