= J.W. Reedy House =

Historic house in South Dakota, United States

- J. W. Reedy House
- U.S. National Register of Historic Places
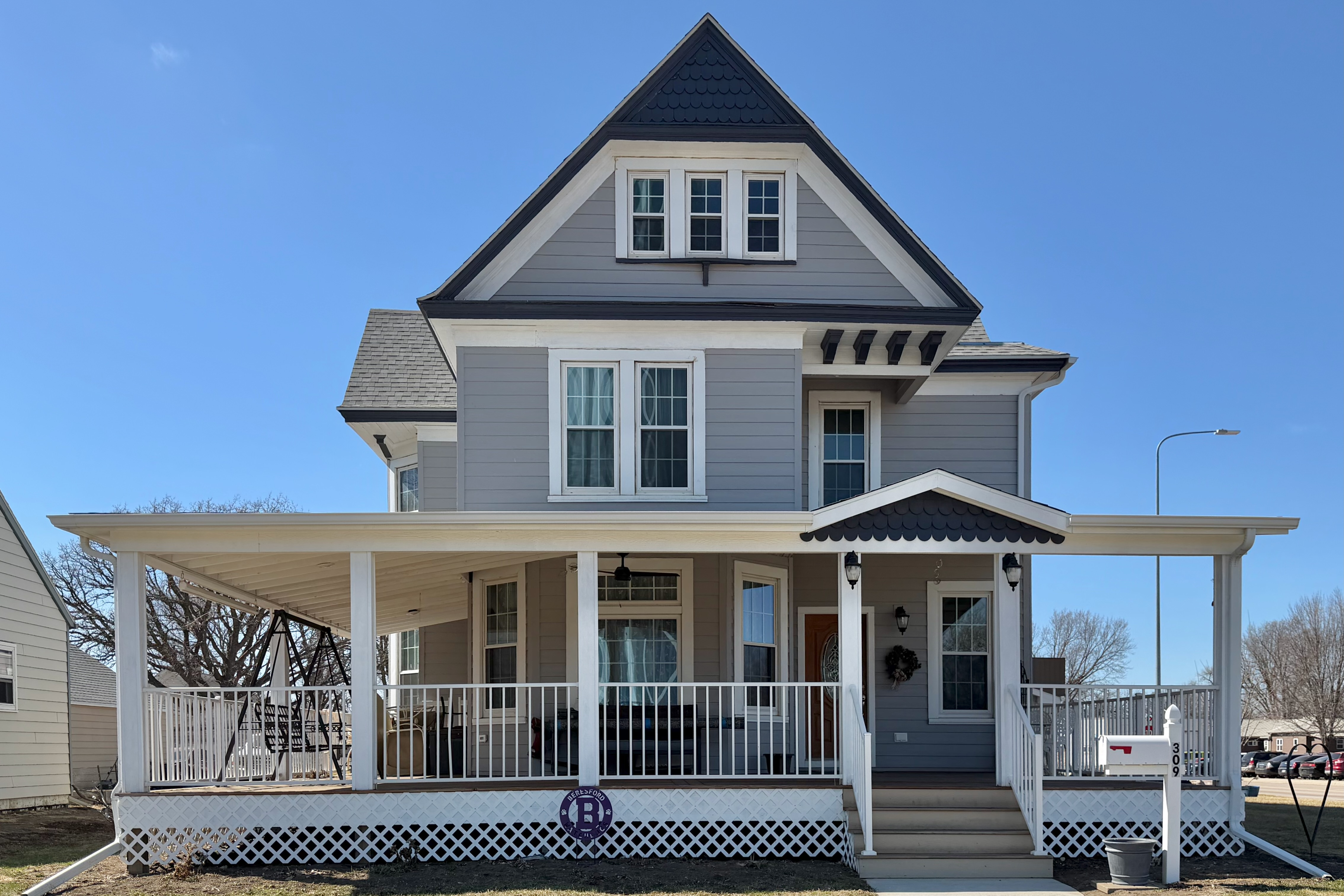

- Location within South Dakota Location within the United States
- Location: 309 N. 2nd Beresford, South Dakota
- Coordinates: 43°05′01″N 96°46′21″W
- Area: less than one acre
- Built: c.1895
- NRHP reference No.: 84000605
- Added to NRHP: December 13, 1984

The J. W. Reedy House, located at 309 N. 2nd in Beresford, South Dakota, was built in about 1895. It was listed on the National Register of Historic Places in 1984.

It was deemed notable for its association with J.W. Reedy, an auctioneer of land throughout 35 U.S. states and Canada. It was one of the largest houses in Beresford.

It is a frame two-and-a-half-story building with two brick chimneys and three dormers. It has a one-story kitchen ell. Plans in 1984 were to convert the house into three apartments. A second contributing building on the property is a summer kitchen/carriage house.

Servants' quarters, not included in the listing, were located across the street in a one-story house.
