= St. Peter's Catholic Church (Jefferson, South Dakota) =

Historic church in South Dakota, United States

- U.S. National Register of Historic Places
- U.S. Historic district
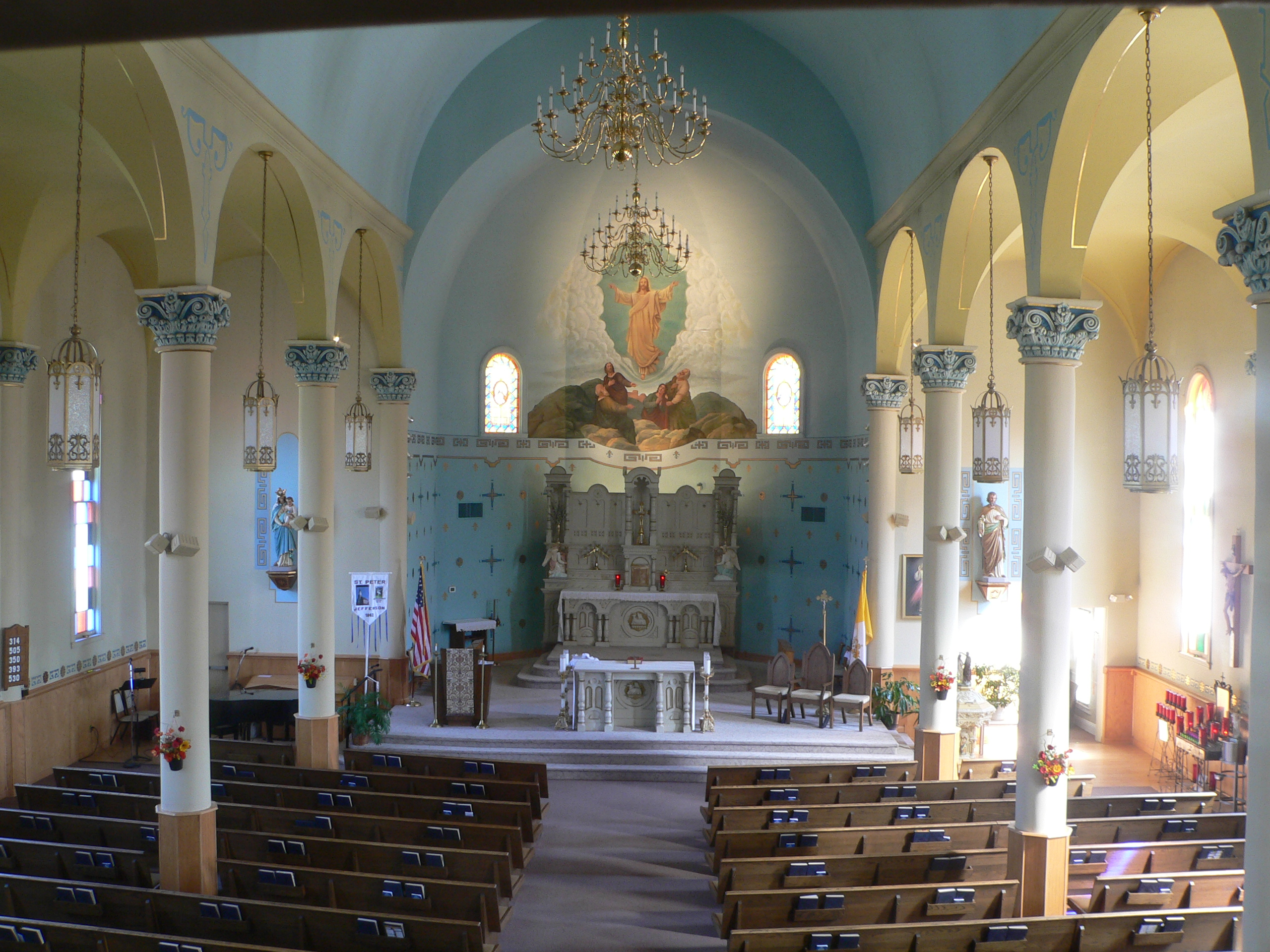
- Interior, viewed from the choir loft

- Location within South Dakota Location within the United States
- Location: 400 Main St., Jefferson, South Dakota
- Coordinates: 42.604155°N 96.560308°W
- Built: 1891
- Architectural style: Romanesque
- NRHP reference No.: 89000833
- Added to NRHP: July 19, 1989

St. Peter's Catholic Church is a parish of the Diocese of Sioux Falls based in Jefferson, South Dakota. Its church building at 400 Main Street was built in 1891 and was added to the National Register of Historic Places in 1989.

Since July 2014, St. Peter's is pastorally linked with the parishes of Blessed Teresa of Calcutta in Dakota Dunes and St. Joseph's in Elk Point in the Yankton deanery, part of a sweeping reorganization of the diocese.

== History ==
The town of Jefferson was settled in 1859, predominantly by French Canadians. Catholic services were held occasionally before the arrival of the first permanent priest, Father Pierre Boucher, in 1867. A small log building to the north of the present church had been used as a schoolhouse and chapel since 1862. Father Boucher was responsible for a pastorate which extended across the Southeastern Dakota Territory, centered on the 25 French-Canadian families in Jefferson. The adjacent churchyard contains a large wooden cross, the replacement for a rude cross erected in May, 1876, when Father Boucher led an eleven-mile pilgrimage, ending in the churchyard at Jefferson, invoking divine aid against the besetting grasshopper plague. Father Boucher died in 1900 in Quebec.

Soon after the arrival of Father Boucher, a large wooden church was built and served until 1890, when the current church was erected, during the pastorate of Father Cyrille St. Pierre. In 1889 a school and convent were built and these were replaced by the present parochial school building in 1951.

The Rev. Charles F. Robinson was the pastor from 1894 until 1924 and he is buried in churchyard.
