= St. Onge Township, Lawrence County, South Dakota =

Township in Lawrence County, South Dakota

Coordinates: 44°33′44″N 103°44′47″W

St. Onge Township is the sole township of Lawrence County, South Dakota, United States; the rest of the county is unorganized territory. The population was 326 as of the 2020 census. It lies on the northern edge of the county.
