= Saint-Genis-de-Saintonge =

- Commune
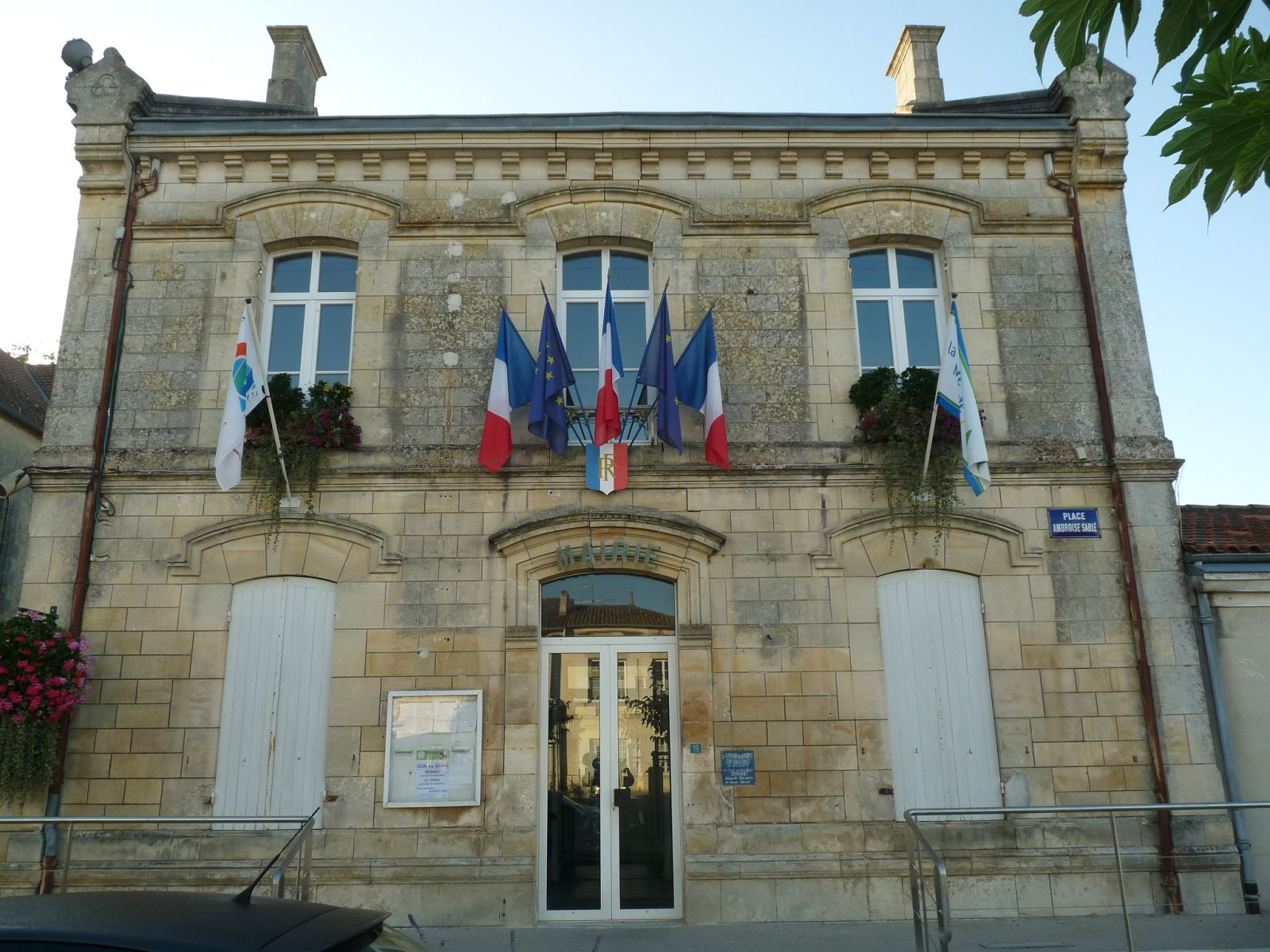
- Town hall
- Location of Saint-Genis-de-Saintonge
- Location within France Location within Nouvelle-Aquitaine
- Coordinates: 45°29′02″N 0°34′01″W
- Country: France
- Region: Nouvelle-Aquitaine
- Department: Charente-Maritime
- Arrondissement: Jonzac
- Canton: Pons
- Intercommunality: Haute-Saintonge

Government
  - Mayor (2020–2026): Jacky Quesson
- Area^{1}: 11.02 km^{2} (4.25 sq mi)
- Elevation: 33 m (108 ft)
- Highest elevation: 51 m (167 ft)
- Lowest elevation: 20 m (66 ft)
- Population (2023): 1,282
  - Density: 116.3/km^{2} (301.3/sq mi)
- Time zone: UTC+01:00 (CET)
  - Summer (DST): UTC+02:00 (CEST)
- INSEE/Postal code: 17331 /17240
- ^{1} French Land Register data, which excludes lakes, ponds, glaciers > 1 km^{2} (0.386 sq mi or 247 acres) and river estuaries.

Saint-Genis-de-Saintonge (French pronunciation: [sɛ̃ ʒəni də sɛ̃tɔ̃ʒ], literally Saint-Genis of Saintonge) is a commune in the Charente-Maritime department in southwestern France.

== Population ==
Historical population
Year	Pop.	±% p.a.
1968	852	—
1975	809	−0.74%
1982	906	+1.63%
1990	956	+0.67%
1999	952	−0.05%
2007	1,214	+3.09%
2012	1,247	+0.54%
2017	1,244	−0.05%
2023	1,282	+0.50%
Source: INSEE

== See also ==
- Communes of the Charente-Maritime department
