= Emmet Township, Union County, South Dakota =

Emmet Township
- Township
- Location within the state of South Dakota
- Coordinates: 42°58′59″N 96°43′30″W
- Country: United States
- State: South Dakota
- County: Union

Area
  - Total: 36.00 sq mi (93.24 km^{2})
  - Land: 36.00 sq mi (93.24 km^{2})
  - Water: 0 sq mi (0.0 km^{2})

Population (2000)
  - Total: 257
  - Density: 7.14/sq mi (2.76/km^{2})
- Time zone: UTC-6 (Central (CST))
  - Summer (DST): UTC-5 (CDT)
- FIPS code: 19500

Emmet Township is a township in Union County, South Dakota, United States. The population was 257 at the 2000 census.

== Geography ==
According to the United States Census Bureau, the township has a total area of 36.0 square miles (93.24 km^{2}), all land.

== Demographics ==
At the 2000 census, there were 257 people, 97 households and 76 families residing in the township. The population density was /km^{2} (/sq mi). There were 100 housing units at an average density of /km^{2} (/sq mi). The racial makeup of the township was 99.2% White and 0.8% Asian. Hispanic or Latino of any race were 0.4% of the population.

There were 97 households, of which 39.2% had children under the age of 18 living with them, 72.2% were married couples living together, 3.1% had a female householder with no husband present, and 21.6% were non-families. 20.6% of all households were made up of individuals, and 7.2% had someone living alone who was 65 years of age or older. The average household size was 2.65 and the average family size was 3.08.

== History ==
Emmet Township was organized in 1900 from parts of the neighboring Spink and Prairie Townships in Union County.
