= Alcester, South Dakota =

- City
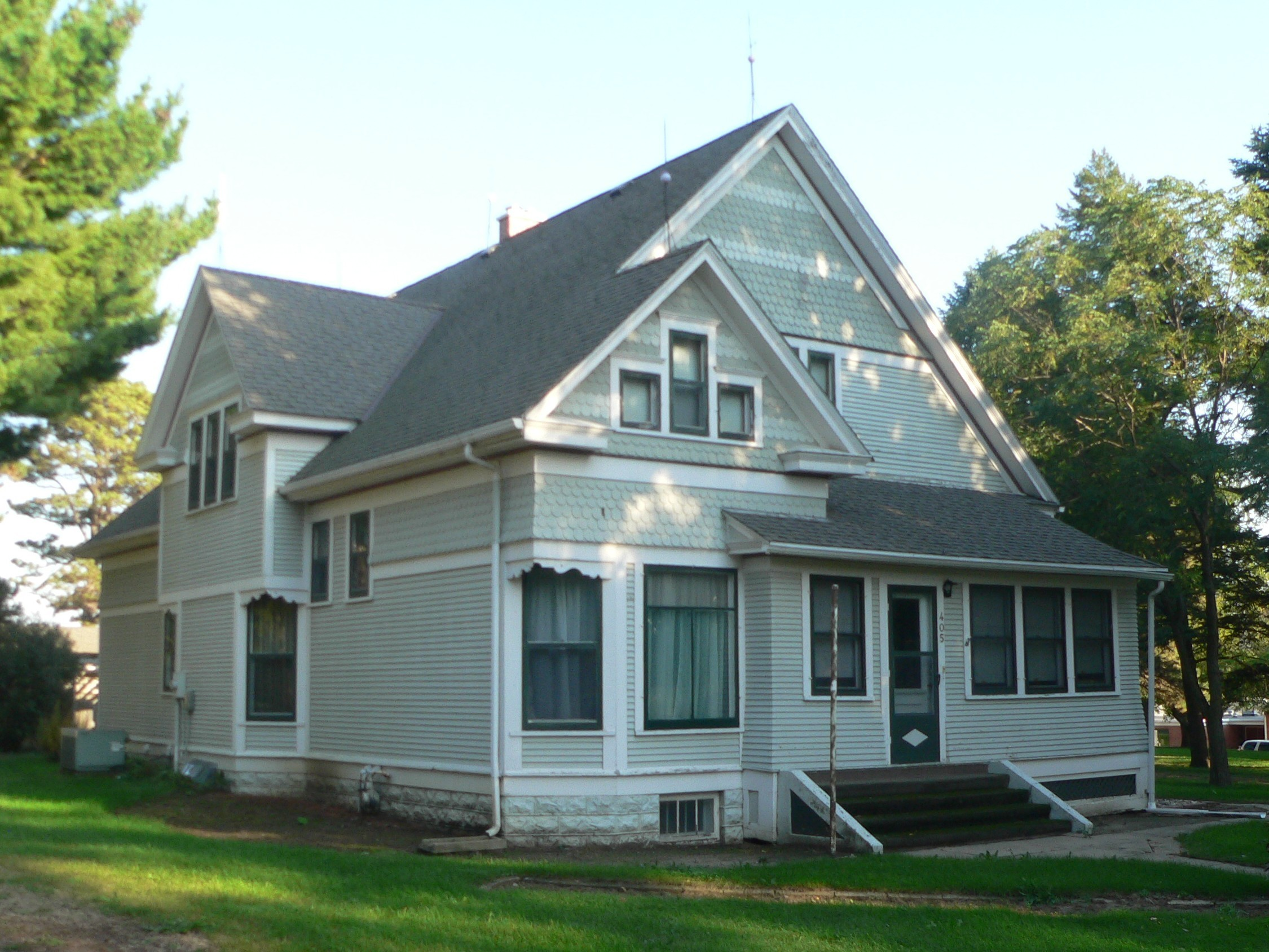
- The historic Hyden House in Alcester in 2015
- Motto: "Small Town Treasure"
- Location in Union County and the state of South Dakota
- Coordinates: 43°01′38″N 96°37′27″W
- Country: United States
- State: South Dakota
- County: Union
- Incorporated: 1893

Area
  - Total: 0.73 sq mi (1.90 km^{2})
  - Land: 0.73 sq mi (1.90 km^{2})
  - Water: 0 sq mi (0.00 km^{2})
- Elevation: 1,417 ft (432 m)

Population (2020)
  - Total: 820
  - Density: 1,117.3/sq mi (431.39/km^{2})
- Time zone: UTC-6 (Central (CST))
  - Summer (DST): UTC-5 (CDT)
- ZIP code: 57001
- Area code: 605
- FIPS code: 46-00700
- GNIS feature ID: 1267262
- Website: alcester.sdcity.gov

Alcester is a city in northern Union County, South Dakota, United States. It is part of the Sioux City, IA–NE–SD Metropolitan Statistical Area. The population was 820 at the 2020 census.

== History ==
Alcester was platted in 1879; early variant names were Linia and Irene. The present name honors Colonel Alcester of the British army. The weekly Alcester Union newspaper began publishing in 1888.

== Geography ==
According to the United States Census Bureau, the city has a total area of 0.33 square miles (0.85 km^{2}), all land.

== Demographics ==
Historical population
Census	Pop.	Note	%±
1900	381		—
1910	409		7.3%
1920	492		20.3%
1930	460		−6.5%
1940	581		26.3%
1950	585		0.7%
1960	479		−18.1%
1970	627		30.9%
1980	885		41.1%
1990	843		−4.7%
2000	880		4.4%
2010	807		−8.3%
2020	820		1.6%
U.S. Decennial Census

=== 2020 census ===
As of the 2020 census, Alcester had a population of 820. The median age was 50.3 years. 18.8% of residents were under the age of 18 and 32.9% were 65 years of age or older. For every 100 females there were 89.8 males, and for every 100 females age 18 and over there were 91.4 males age 18 and over.

0.0% of residents lived in urban areas, while 100.0% lived in rural areas.

There were 367 households in Alcester, of which 24.5% had children under the age of 18 living in them. Of all households, 44.4% were married-couple households, 20.4% were households with a male householder and no spouse or partner present, and 27.0% were households with a female householder and no spouse or partner present. About 35.9% of all households were made up of individuals and 19.1% had someone living alone who was 65 years of age or older.

There were 391 housing units, of which 6.1% were vacant. The homeowner vacancy rate was 1.6% and the rental vacancy rate was 0.8%.

Racial composition as of the 2020 census
Race	Number	Percent
White	765	93.3%
Black or African American	0	0.0%
American Indian and Alaska Native	11	1.3%
Asian	10	1.2%
Native Hawaiian and Other Pacific Islander	0	0.0%
Some other race	7	0.9%
Two or more races	27	3.3%
Hispanic or Latino (of any race)	18	2.2%

=== 2010 census ===
As of the census of 2010, there were 807 people, 352 households, and 218 families residing in the city. The population density was 2,445.5 inhabitants per square mile (944.2/km^{2}). There were 408 housing units at an average density of 1,236.4 units per square mile (477.4 units/km^{2}). The racial makeup of the city was 97.4% White, 0.1% African American, 0.2% Native American, 0.7% Asian, 0.2% from other races, and 1.2% from two or more races. Hispanic or Latino of any race were 1.5% of the population.

There were 352 households, of which 25.6% had children under the age of 18 living with them, 49.4% were married couples living together, 9.9% had a female householder with no husband present, 2.6% had a male householder with no wife present, and 38.1% were non-families. 33.0% of all households were made up of individuals, and 18.8% had someone living alone who was 65 years of age or older. The average household size was 2.16 and the average family size was 2.72.

The median age in the city was 48.8 years. 21.8% of residents were under the age of 18; 3.2% were between the ages of 18 and 24; 20.1% were from 25 to 44; 27.8% were from 45 to 64; and 27.1% were 65 years of age or older. The gender makeup of the city was 47.8% male and 52.2% female.

=== 2000 census ===
As of the census of 2000, there were 880 people, 388 households, and 233 families residing in the city. The population density was 2,590.8 inhabitants per square mile (1,000.3/km^{2}). There were 430 housing units at an average density of 1,266.0 units per square mile (488.8 units/km^{2}). The racial makeup of the city was 98.41% White, 0.23% Native American, 0.91% Asian, and 0.45% from two or more races.

There were 388 households, out of which 25.0% had children under the age of 18 living with them, 53.4% were married couples living together, 5.7% had a female householder with no husband present, and 39.7% were non-families. 36.9% of all households were made up of individuals, and 24.7% had someone living alone who was 65 years of age or older. The average household size was 2.10 and the average family size was 2.72.

In the city, the population was spread out, with 18.9% under the age of 18, 5.8% from 18 to 24, 19.9% from 25 to 44, 22.2% from 45 to 64, and 33.3% who were 65 years of age or older. The median age was 48 years. For every 100 females, there were 74.6 males. For every 100 females age 18 and over, there were 71.6 males.

The median income for a household in the city was $29,432, and the median income for a family was $44,286. Males had a median income of $28,047 versus $21,167 for females. The per capita income for the city was $16,593. About 6.5% of families and 7.9% of the population were below the poverty line, including 3.8% of those under the age of 18 and 16.0% of those 65 and older.

== Education ==
Alcester-Hudson High School is the only high school in the Alcester-Hudson School District.

== Notable person ==
- Rudie M. Saltness - former member of the Minnesota House of Representatives, born in Alcester
- Craig Doty - College Basketball Coach, born and raised in Alcester

== See also ==
- List of cities in South Dakota
