= Richland, South Dakota =

Richland
- Unincorporated community
- Location within the state of South Dakota Richland (the United States)
- Coordinates: 42°45′20″N 96°38′31″W
- Country: United States
- State: South Dakota
- County: Union

Area
  - Total: 5.64 sq mi (14.62 km^{2})
  - Land: 5.64 sq mi (14.62 km^{2})
  - Water: 0 sq mi (0.00 km^{2})
- Elevation: 1,161 ft (354 m)

Population (2020)
  - Total: 97
  - Density: 17.2/sq mi (6.63/km^{2})
- Time zone: UTC-6 (Central (CST))
  - Summer (DST): UTC-5 (CDT)
- FIPS code: 46-54750
- GNIS feature ID: 2628849

Richland is a small unincorporated community and census-designated place (CDP) in Union County, South Dakota, United States. The population was 97 at the 2020 census.

== History ==
In 1861, the community was founded by and named after Milton M. Rich of Chicago. Mr. Rich was reported to have dreamed of building a community below the bluffs. However, it was also reported that Mr. Rich disagreed with railroad officials on how to divide the site of the town. The dispute was never resolved; and as a result, the railroad was deflected to Sioux City, Iowa after reaching Le Mars, Iowa.

== Demographics ==
Historical population
Census	Pop.	Note	%±
2020	97		—
U.S. Decennial Census
