= Lawrence County, South Dakota =

County in South Dakota, United States

- County
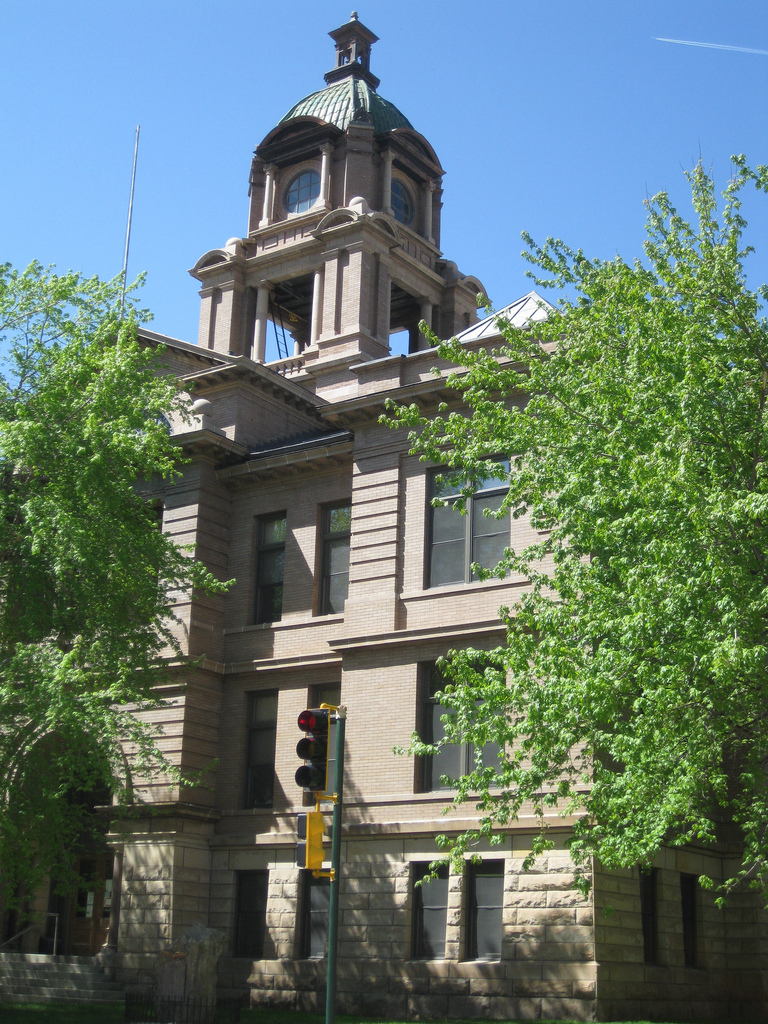
- Lawrence County Courthouse in Deadwood

- Location within the U.S. state of South Dakota
- Coordinates: 44°20′54.65″N 103°48′22.903″W
- Country: United States
- State: South Dakota
- Created: 1875
- Organized: 1877
- Named for: John Lawrence
- Seat: Deadwood
- Largest city: Spearfish

Area
  - Total: 800.311 sq mi (2,072.80 km^{2})
  - Land: 800.053 sq mi (2,072.13 km^{2})
  - Water: 0.258 sq mi (0.67 km^{2}) 0.03%

Population (2020)
  - Total: 25,768
  - Estimate (2025): 29,459 ▲
  - Density: 35.068/sq mi (13.540/km^{2})
- Time zone: UTC−7 (Mountain)
  - Summer (DST): UTC−6 (MDT)
- Congressional district: At-large
- Website: lawrence.sd.us

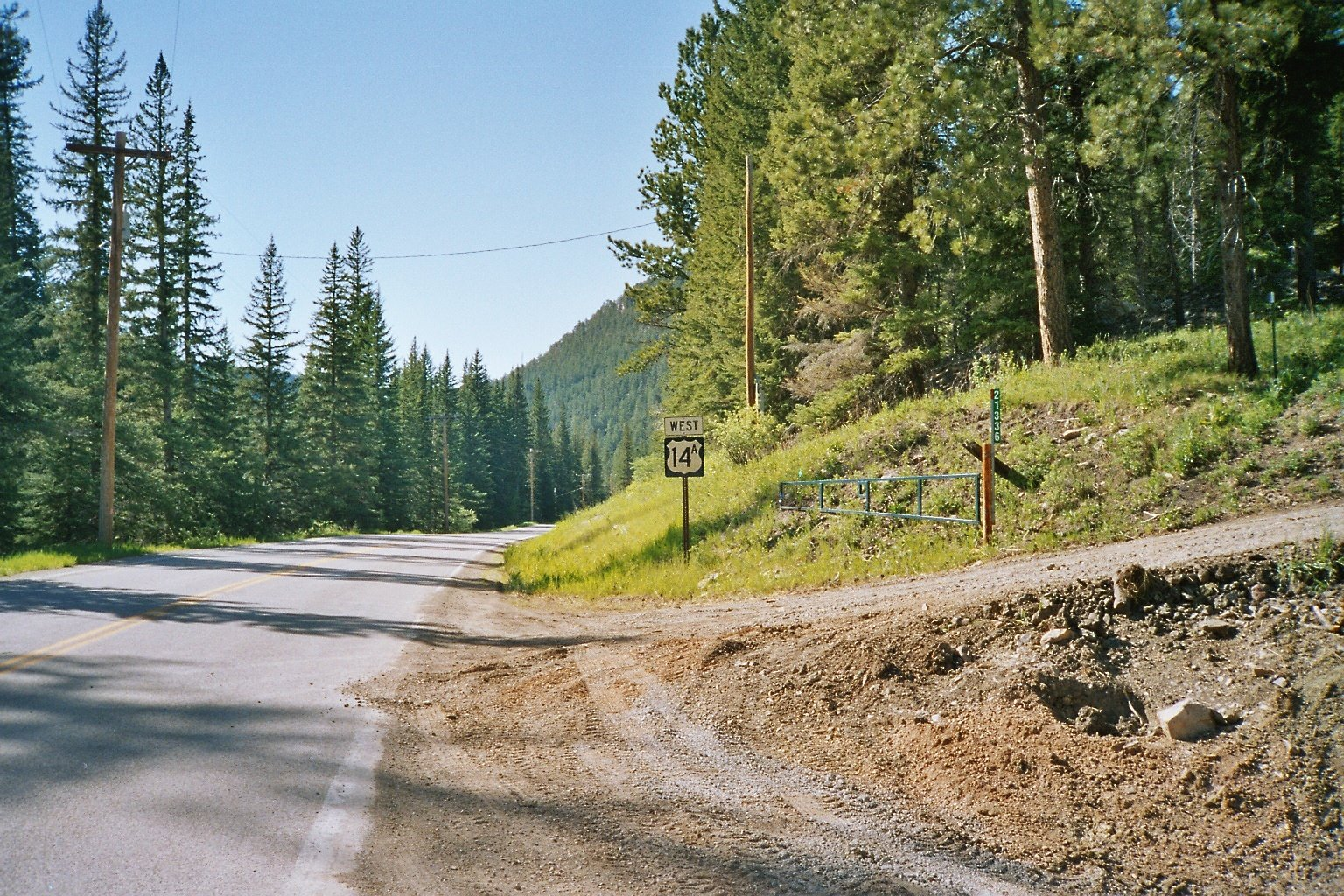
US Highway 14a w

Lawrence County is a county in the U.S. state of South Dakota. As of the 2020 census, the population was 25,768, making it the 8th most populous county in South Dakota, and was estimated to be 29,459 in 2025. Its county seat is Deadwood.

Lawrence County is coextensive with the Spearfish, SD Micropolitan Statistical Area, which is also included in the Rapid City-Spearfish, SD Combined Statistical Area.

== History ==
Lawrence County was created January 11, 1875, and was organized in 1877. The county was named for "Colonel" John Lawrence, who came to the county as first treasurer in 1877. Lawrence had previously served in the Dakota Territorial Legislature, as a Sergeant at Arms for the United States House of Representatives, and a US Marshal for the Dakota territory. After retirement, he continued to act as county road supervisor and as an election judge. The title "Colonel" was honorary, bestowed by the governor of the Dakota Territory.

== Geography ==
Lawrence County lies on the west side of South Dakota. Its west boundary line abuts the east boundary line of the state of Wyoming. The terrain of Lawrence County consists of mountains in the south and west, falling off to the hilly northeast portion. A tributary of the Redwater River flows east-northeasterly along a portion of the county's north boundary line, delineating that portion of the line. The terrain generally slopes to the county's northeast corner; its highest point is Crooks Tower, at 7,137'.

According to the United States Census Bureau, the county has a total area of 800.311 square miles (2,072.80 km^{2}), of which 800.053 square miles (2,072.13 km^{2}) is land and 0.258 square miles (0.67 km^{2}) (0.03%) is water. It is the 41st largest county in South Dakota by total area.

=== Major highways ===
- Interstate 90
- U.S. Highway 14
- U.S. Highway 14A
- U.S. Highway 85
- U.S. Highway 385
- South Dakota Highway 34

=== Transit ===
- Jefferson Lines

=== Adjacent counties ===
- Butte County – north
- Meade County – east
- Pennington County – south
- Weston County, Wyoming – southwest
- Crook County, Wyoming – west

=== Protected areas ===
- Black Hills National Forest (partial)
- Beilage Hepler State Game Production Area
- Coxes-Mirror Lakes State Game Production Area
- Harrison-Badger-Trucano State Game Production Area
- Iron Creek Lake State Game Production Area
- Reausaw Lake State Game Production Area
- Spearfish Canyon State Nature Area

== Demographics ==
Historical population
Census	Pop.	Note	%±
1880	13,218		—
1890	11,673		−11.7%
1900	17,897		53.3%
1910	19,694		10.0%
1920	13,029		−33.8%
1930	13,920		6.8%
1940	19,093		37.2%
1950	16,648		−12.8%
1960	17,075		2.6%
1970	17,453		2.2%
1980	18,339		5.1%
1990	20,655		12.6%
2000	21,802		5.6%
2010	24,097		10.5%
2020	25,768		6.9%
2025 (est.)	29,459	▲	14.3%
U.S. Decennial Census; 1790–1960 1900–1990; 1990–2000 2010–2020

=== Recent estimates ===
As of the third quarter of 2024, the median home value in Lawrence County was $322,680.

As of the 2023 American Community Survey, there are 11,812 estimated households in Lawrence County with an average of 2.16 persons per household. The county has a median household income of $66,766. Approximately 11.1% of the county's population lives at or below the poverty line. Lawrence County has an estimated 64.7% employment rate, with 34.1% of the population holding a bachelor's degree or higher and 95.4% holding a high school diploma.

The top five reported ancestries (people were allowed to report up to two ancestries, thus the figures will generally add to more than 100%) were English (95.3%), Spanish (2.3%), Indo-European (1.2%), Asian and Pacific Islander (0.7%), and Other (0.5%).

Lawrence County, South Dakota – racial and ethnic composition
Note: the US Census treats Hispanic/Latino as an ethnic category. This table excludes Latinos from the racial categories and assigns them to a separate category. Hispanics/Latinos may be of any race.

Race / ethnicity (NH = non-Hispanic)	Pop. 1980	Pop. 1990	Pop. 2000	Pop. 2010	Pop. 2020
White alone (NH)	17,734 (96.70%)	19,726 (95.50%)	20,631 (94.63%)	22,349 (92.75%)	22,935 (89.01%)
Black or African American alone (NH)	27 (0.15%)	29 (0.14%)	45 (0.21%)	87 (0.36%)	128 (0.50%)
Native American or Alaska Native alone (NH)	331 (1.80%)	514 (2.49%)	454 (2.08%)	457 (1.90%)	486 (1.89%)
Asian alone (NH)	29 (0.16%)	56 (0.27%)	70 (0.32%)	157 (0.65%)	196 (0.76%)
Pacific Islander alone (NH)	—	—	11 (0.05%)	6 (0.02%)	18 (0.07%)
Other race alone (NH)	21 (0.11%)	3 (0.01%)	2 (0.01%)	10 (0.04%)	51 (0.20%)
Mixed race or multiracial (NH)	—	—	193 (0.89%)	419 (1.74%)	1,032 (4.00%)
Hispanic or Latino (any race)	197 (1.07%)	327 (1.58%)	396 (1.82%)	612 (2.54%)	922 (3.58%)
Total	18,339 (100.00%)	20,655 (100.00%)	21,802 (100.00%)	24,097 (100.00%)	25,768 (100.00%)

=== 2020 census ===
As of the 2020 census, there were 25,768 people, 11,444 households, and 6,689 families residing in the county. The population density was 32.2 inhabitants per square mile (12.4/km^{2}). There were 14,163 housing units at an average density of 17.7 per square mile (6.8/km^{2}).

Of the residents, 19.2% were under the age of 18 and 23.3% were 65 years of age or older; the median age was 43.5 years. For every 100 females there were 97.9 males, and for every 100 females age 18 and over there were 95.7 males.

The racial makeup of the county was 90.5% White, 0.5% African American, 2.1% Native American, 0.8% Asian, 0.09% Pacific Islander, 0.7% from some other races, and 5.3% from two or more races. Hispanic or Latino people of any race were 3.6% of the population.

There were 11,444 households in the county, of which 22.9% had children under the age of 18 living with them and 25.4% had a female householder with no spouse or partner present. About 33.7% of all households were made up of individuals and 15.4% had someone living alone who was 65 years of age or older.

Of those households, 45.7% were married couples living together and 45.2% were non-families, the average household size was 2.20, and the average family size was 2.84.

There were 14,163 housing units, of which 19.2% were vacant. Among occupied housing units, 65.4% were owner-occupied and 34.6% were renter-occupied. The homeowner vacancy rate was 1.8% and the rental vacancy rate was 9.5%.

=== 2010 census ===
As of the 2010 census, there were 24,097 people, 10,536 households, and 6,181 families in the county. The population density was 30.1 inhabitants per square mile (11.6/km^{2}). There were 12,756 housing units at an average density of 15.9 per square mile (6.1/km^{2}). The racial makeup of the county was 94.40% White, 0.38% African American, 2.03% Native American, 0.66% Asian, 0.02% Pacific Islander, 0.49% from some other races and 2.02% from two or more races. Hispanic or Latino people of any race were 2.54% of the population. In terms of ancestry, 44.5% were German, 13.7% were Irish, 13.4% were English, 11.4% were Norwegian, and 4.4% were American.

Of the 10,536 households, 24.0% had children under the age of 18 living with them, 46.6% were married couples living together, 8.1% had a female householder with no husband present, 41.3% were non-families, and 33.2% of all households were made up of individuals. The average household size was 2.19 and the average family size was 2.77. The median age was 41.0 years.

The median income for a household in the county was $42,356 and the median income for a family was $60,209. Males had a median income of $38,933 versus $28,649 for females. The per capita income for the county was $25,465. About 8.4% of families and 15.3% of the population were below the poverty line, including 15.8% of those under age 18 and 8.1% of those age 65 or over.

== Communities ==
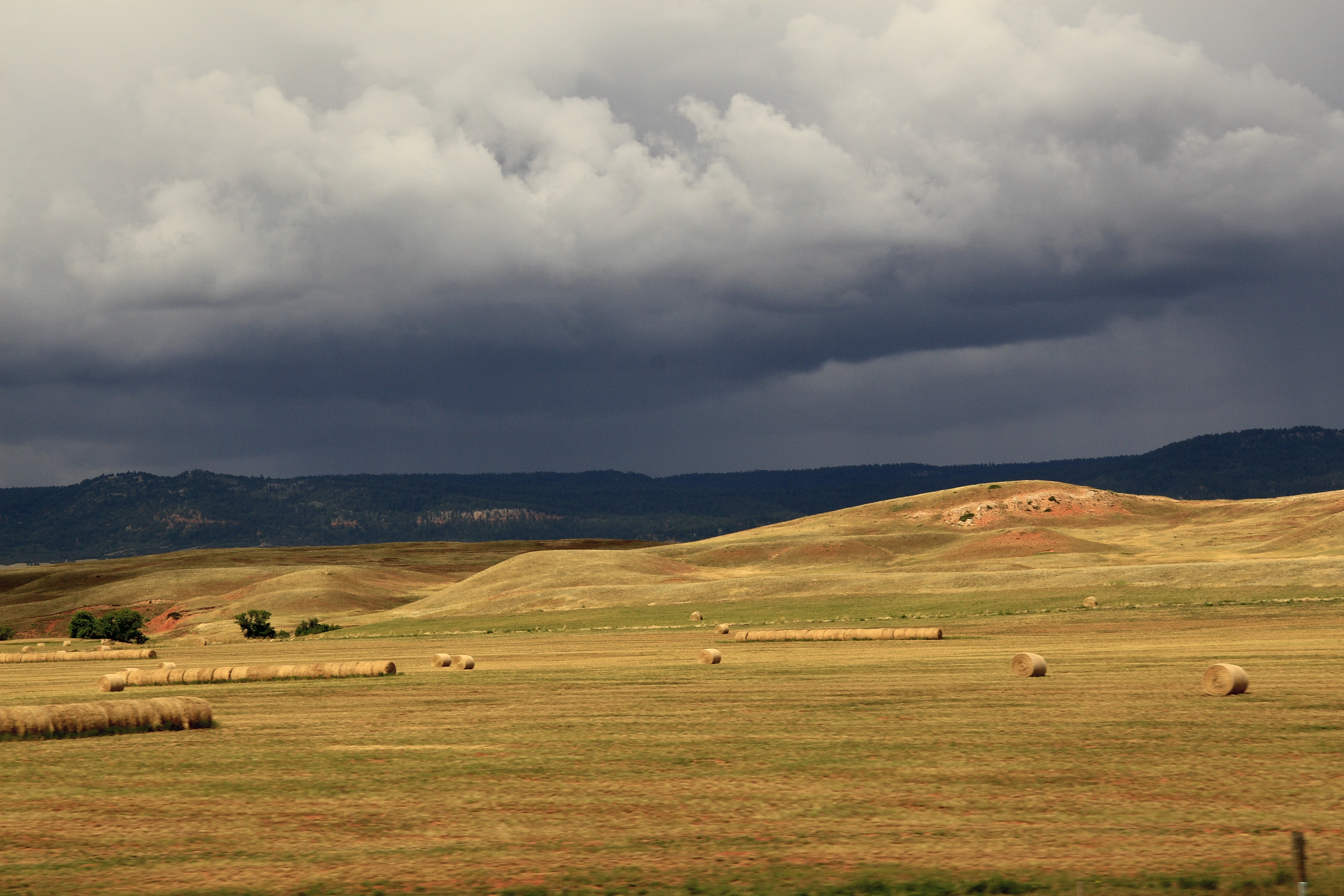
Hay fields and scenery, North of Deadwood

=== Cities ===
- Central City
- Deadwood (county seat)
- Lead
- Spearfish
- Whitewood

=== Census-designated places ===
- Boulder Canyon
- Crook City
- Mountain Plains
- North Spearfish
- Saint Onge

=== Other unincorporated communities ===
- Beaver Crossing
- Brownsville
- Cheyenne Crossing
- Chinatown
- Dumont
- Elmore
- Englewood
- Galena
- Gayville
- Hanna
- Nemo
- Preston
- Roubaix
- Savoy

=== Ghost towns ===
- Blacktail
- Greenwood
- Lincoln AKA Carterville
- Garden City
- Merritt (partial)
- Nahant
- Terraville
- Tinton
- Trojan (AKA Portland)

=== Townships and unorganized territories ===
- St. Onge Township
- North Lawrence (unorganized territory)
- South Lawrence (unorganized territory)

== Politics ==
Owing to its Yankee influence, Lawrence County has been reliably Republican for a full century. It was the only South Dakota county to remain loyal to Herbert Hoover in his landslide 1932 loss. In fact, Lawrence County was the second-westernmost county, behind only Utah's Kane County, to never vote for Franklin D. Roosevelt. The only Democratic presidential candidates to carry Lawrence County have been Woodrow Wilson in 1912 and 1916, and William Jennings Bryan in 1896. Lawrence County has also been one of the most consistent strongholds for the Libertarian Party, giving their 2016 nominee, Gary Johnson, one of the largest vote share out of any county outside his home state of New Mexico, with 7.9%. In 2020, Libertarian Party nominee Jo Jorgensen received 3.9% of the popular vote, her second best performance in any county during the election cycle.

United States presidential election results for Lawrence County, South Dakota
Year	Republican		Democratic		Third party(ies)	
Year	No.	%	No.	%	No.	%
1892	2,140	51.18%	546	13.06%	1,495	35.76%
1896	2,210	42.91%	2,905	56.41%	35	0.68%
1900	3,435	55.96%	2,619	42.67%	84	1.37%
1904	4,247	65.53%	1,347	20.78%	887	13.69%
1908	2,735	50.86%	1,564	29.09%	1,078	20.05%
1912	0	0.00%	2,412	53.95%	2,059	46.05%
1916	2,074	47.51%	2,157	49.42%	134	3.07%
1920	2,986	68.50%	1,201	27.55%	172	3.95%
1924	3,255	71.07%	649	14.17%	676	14.76%
1928	4,141	69.63%	1,785	30.02%	21	0.35%
1932	3,708	53.99%	3,106	45.22%	54	0.79%
1936	4,974	56.19%	3,809	43.03%	69	0.78%
1940	5,288	60.07%	3,515	39.93%	0	0.00%
1944	3,528	65.41%	1,866	34.59%	0	0.00%
1948	3,778	62.50%	2,209	36.54%	58	0.96%
1952	5,559	76.57%	1,701	23.43%	0	0.00%
1956	4,654	71.33%	1,871	28.67%	0	0.00%
1960	5,083	66.06%	2,612	33.94%	0	0.00%
1964	3,743	51.91%	3,468	48.09%	0	0.00%
1968	4,185	60.23%	2,425	34.90%	338	4.86%
1972	4,795	65.22%	2,533	34.45%	24	0.33%
1976	4,206	56.46%	3,102	41.64%	141	1.89%
1980	5,306	63.14%	2,259	26.88%	838	9.97%
1984	5,949	69.42%	2,565	29.93%	55	0.64%
1988	5,570	59.39%	3,705	39.50%	104	1.11%
1992	3,770	39.03%	3,157	32.68%	2,732	28.28%
1996	4,430	46.92%	3,568	37.79%	1,444	15.29%
2000	6,327	67.27%	2,797	29.74%	282	3.00%
2004	7,489	64.45%	3,857	33.20%	273	2.35%
2008	6,787	56.30%	4,932	40.91%	336	2.79%
2012	7,025	61.85%	3,973	34.98%	361	3.18%
2016	7,411	62.58%	3,356	28.34%	1,075	9.08%
2020	8,753	63.30%	4,537	32.81%	538	3.89%
2024	9,904	64.27%	5,074	32.93%	431	2.80%

== Education ==
School districts include:

- Lead-Deadwood School District 40-1
- Spearfish School District 40-2

== See also ==
- List of Superfund sites in South Dakota
- National Register of Historic Places listings in Lawrence County, South Dakota
