= Union County, South Dakota =

County in South Dakota, United States

- County
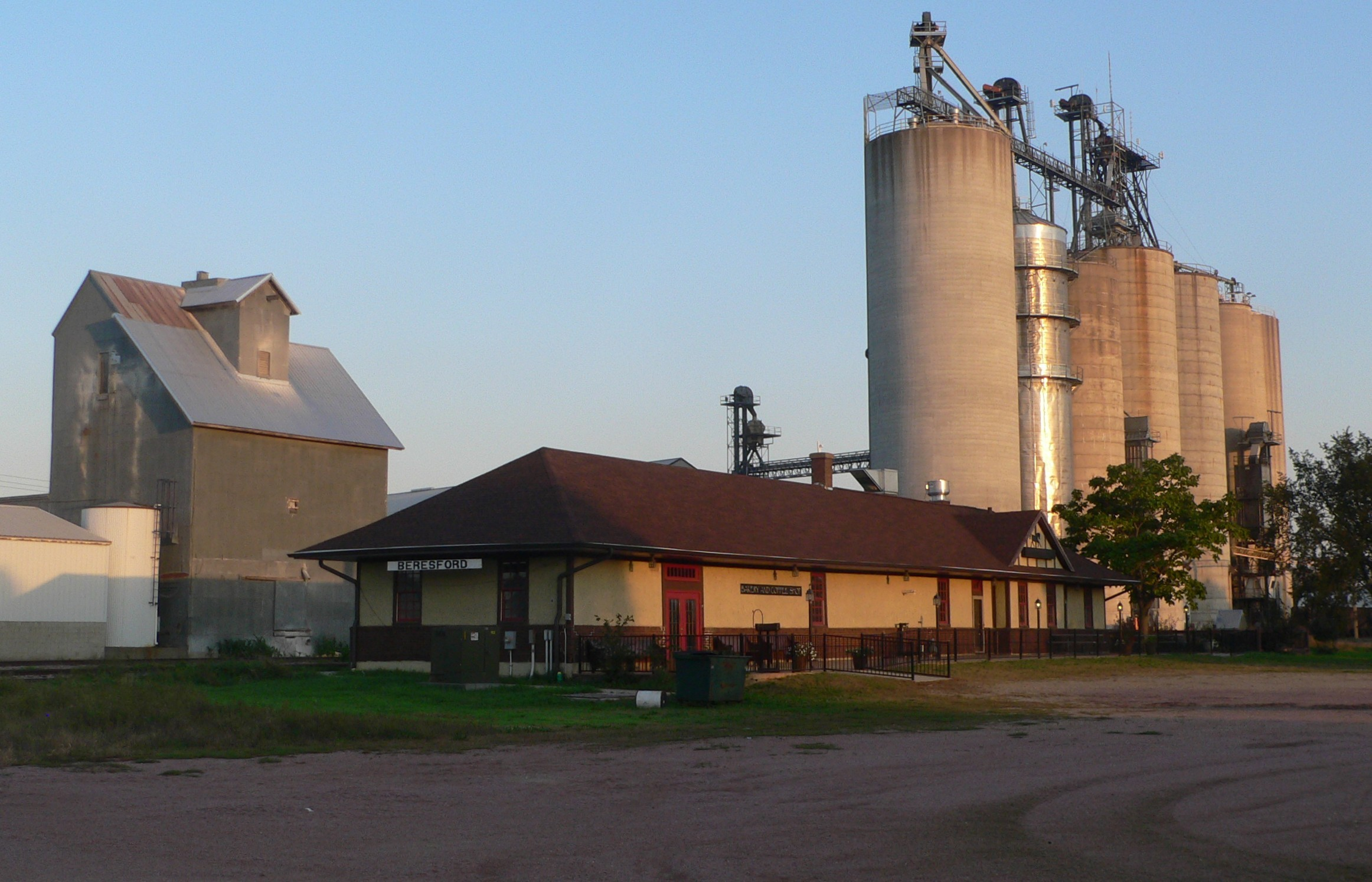
- Chicago and North Western Railway depot in Beresford, South Dakota

- Location within the U.S. state of South Dakota
- Coordinates: 42°50′N 96°39′W
- Country: United States
- State: South Dakota
- Founded: April 10, 1862
- Seat: Elk Point
- Largest community: Dakota Dunes

Area
  - Total: 467 sq mi (1,210 km^{2})
  - Land: 461 sq mi (1,190 km^{2})
  - Water: 6.6 sq mi (17 km^{2}) 1.4%

Population (2020)
  - Total: 16,811
  - Estimate (2025): 17,402 ▲
  - Density: 36.5/sq mi (14.1/km^{2})
- Time zone: UTC−6 (Central)
  - Summer (DST): UTC−5 (CDT)
- Congressional district: At-large
- Website: unioncountysd.gov

Union County is the southernmost county in the U.S. state of South Dakota. As of the 2020 census, the population was 16,811, making it the 13th most populous county in South Dakota. Its county seat has been Elk Point since April 30, 1865. Originally named Cole County, its name was changed to Union on January 7, 1864, because of Civil War sentiment.

Union County is part of the Sioux City metropolitan area. The Progressive Farmer rated Union County second in the "2006 Best Place to Live Survey" in the U.S., because "its schools are good, its towns neat and its people friendly".

== History ==
Founded on April 10, 1862, as Cole County, it was renamed Union County on January 7, 1864, when its boundaries were changed to encompass land previously part of neighboring Lincoln County. The county seat was moved from Richland to Elk Point on April 30, 1865.

== Geography ==
Union County lies on the southeast corner of South Dakota. Its east boundary line abuts the west boundary line of the State of Iowa (across the Big Sioux River), and its south/southwest boundary line abuts the north boundary line of the State of Nebraska (across the Missouri River). The Brule Creek flows southeasterly across the central part of the county, emptying into the Big Sioux. The county terrain consists of rolling hills, devoted to agriculture except around built-up areas. The terrain slopes to the south and east; its highest point is near its northwest corner, at 1,509 ft (460 m) ASL. The county has a total area of 467 square miles (1,210 km^{2}), of which 461 square miles (1,190 km^{2}) is land and 6.6 square miles (17 km^{2}) (1.4%) is water. It is the fifth-smallest county in South Dakota by area.

=== Major highways ===
- Interstate 29
- South Dakota Highway 11
- South Dakota Highway 19
- South Dakota Highway 46
- South Dakota Highway 48
- South Dakota Highway 50
- South Dakota Highway 105

=== Adjacent counties ===
- Lincoln County to the north
- Sioux County, Iowa to the northeast
- Plymouth County, Iowa to the east
- Woodbury County, Iowa to the southeast
- Dakota County, Nebraska to the south
- Dixon County, Nebraska to the southwest
- Clay County to the west

=== Protected areas ===
- Adams Homestead and State Nature Preserve
- Bent River State Game Production Area
- Bolton State Game Production Area
- Cusick State game Production Area
- Cut Off Bend State Game Production Area
- Missouri National Recreational River (partial)
- Petry-Conway State Game Production Area
- Petry/Harmelink State Game Production Area
- Ryan State Game Production Area
- Union Grove State Park
- Warren Wilderness State Game Production Area

=== Lakes ===
- Burbank Lake (partial)
- McCook Lake
- Mud Lake

== Demographics ==
Historical population
Census	Pop.	Note	%±
1870	3,507		—
1880	6,813		94.3%
1890	9,130		34.0%
1900	11,153		22.2%
1910	10,676		−4.3%
1920	11,099		4.0%
1930	11,480		3.4%
1940	11,675		1.7%
1950	10,792		−7.6%
1960	10,197		−5.5%
1970	9,643		−5.4%
1980	10,938		13.4%
1990	10,189		−6.8%
2000	12,584		23.5%
2010	14,399		14.4%
2020	16,811		16.8%
2025 (est.)	17,402	▲	3.5%
U.S. Decennial Census; 1790–1960 1900–1990; 1990–2000 2010–2020

=== 2020 census ===
As of the 2020 census, there were 16,811 people, 6,822 households, and 4,613 families in the county. The population density was 36.5 inhabitants per square mile (14.1/km^{2}). Of the residents, 24.7% were under the age of 18 and 18.8% were 65 years of age or older; the median age was 41.0 years. For every 100 females there were 102.2 males, and for every 100 females age 18 and over there were 101.9 males.

The racial makeup of the county was 90.0% White, 1.0% Black or African American, 0.9% American Indian and Alaska Native, 1.5% Asian, 1.5% from some other race, and 5.0% from two or more races. Hispanic or Latino residents of any race comprised 3.9% of the population.

There were 6,822 households in the county, of which 30.8% had children under the age of 18 living with them and 19.5% had a female householder with no spouse or partner present. About 26.9% of all households were made up of individuals and 12.1% had someone living alone who was 65 years of age or older.

There were 7,215 housing units, of which 5.4% were vacant. Among occupied housing units, 72.9% were owner-occupied and 27.1% were renter-occupied. The homeowner vacancy rate was 1.4% and the rental vacancy rate was 4.0%.

=== 2010 census ===
As of the 2010 census, there were 14,399 people, 5,756 households, and 4,043 families in the county. The population density was 31.3 inhabitants per square mile (12.1/km^{2}). There were 6,280 housing units at an average density of 13.6 per square mile (5.3/km^{2}). The racial makeup of the county was 95.5% white, 0.9% Asian, 0.7% black or African American, 0.6% American Indian, 0.1% Pacific islander, 0.7% from other races, and 1.6% from two or more races. Those of Hispanic or Latino origin made up 2.1% of the population. In terms of ancestry, 42.0% were German, 18.2% were Norwegian, 17.7% were Irish, 7.9% were English, 6.8% were Swedish, and 3.7% were American.

Of the 5,756 households, 32.8% had children under the age of 18 living with them, 58.9% were married couples living together, 7.5% had a female householder with no husband present, 29.8% were non-families, and 25.1% of all households were made up of individuals. The average household size was 2.49 and the average family size was 2.98. The median age was 40.2 years.

The median income for a household in the county was $59,889 and the median income for a family was $71,308. Males had a median income of $42,702 versus $31,993 for females. The per capita income for the county was $33,783. About 3.9% of families and 4.9% of the population were below the poverty line, including 4.3% of those under age 18 and 10.5% of those age 65 or over.

== Communities ==
=== Cities ===
- Alcester
- Beresford (partial)
- Elk Point (county seat)
- Jefferson
- North Sioux City

=== Census-designated places ===
- Dakota Dunes
- Richland

=== Unincorporated communities ===
- Alsen
- Garryowen
- Junction City
- McCook Lake
- Midway
- Nora
- Spink
- Wynstone

=== Ghost towns ===
- Emmet
- Gothland (Alcester Twp)
- Hill Side (Emmet Twp)
- Texas (Elk Point Twp)
- Morganfield

=== Townships ===
- Alcester
- Big Sioux
- Big Springs
- Brule
- Civil Bend
- Elk Point
- Emmet
- Jefferson
- Prairie
- Richland
- Sioux Valley
- Spink
- Virginia

=== Unorganized territory ===
- Richland

== Politics ==
Union County voters were more politically centered in times past, but the county has selected the Republican Party candidate in every national election since 2000 (as of 2024).

United States presidential election results for Union County, South Dakota
Year	Republican		Democratic		Third party(ies)	
Year	No.	%	No.	%	No.	%
1892	860	43.30%	241	12.13%	885	44.56%
1896	1,297	46.24%	1,491	53.16%	17	0.61%
1900	1,571	53.00%	1,358	45.82%	35	1.18%
1904	1,813	68.31%	730	27.51%	111	4.18%
1908	1,392	56.63%	1,009	41.05%	57	2.32%
1912	0	0.00%	965	39.08%	1,504	60.92%
1916	1,108	44.95%	1,313	53.27%	44	1.78%
1920	1,942	66.17%	841	28.65%	152	5.18%
1924	1,665	45.04%	877	23.72%	1,155	31.24%
1928	2,415	53.19%	2,106	46.39%	19	0.42%
1932	1,381	27.86%	3,530	71.21%	46	0.93%
1936	1,845	31.89%	3,520	60.85%	420	7.26%
1940	3,116	54.44%	2,608	45.56%	0	0.00%
1944	2,501	54.87%	2,057	45.13%	0	0.00%
1948	2,205	49.38%	2,237	50.10%	23	0.52%
1952	3,393	67.35%	1,645	32.65%	0	0.00%
1956	2,636	52.94%	2,343	47.06%	0	0.00%
1960	2,688	53.56%	2,331	46.44%	0	0.00%
1964	1,727	37.91%	2,828	62.09%	0	0.00%
1968	2,212	49.70%	2,014	45.25%	225	5.06%
1972	2,271	46.90%	2,554	52.75%	17	0.35%
1976	2,297	47.26%	2,540	52.26%	23	0.47%
1980	2,788	55.16%	1,830	36.21%	436	8.63%
1984	2,431	51.98%	2,221	47.49%	25	0.53%
1988	1,907	41.91%	2,612	57.41%	31	0.68%
1992	1,784	35.00%	2,210	43.36%	1,103	21.64%
1996	2,234	42.90%	2,378	45.67%	595	11.43%
2000	3,265	56.57%	2,358	40.85%	149	2.58%
2004	3,987	56.57%	3,000	42.57%	61	0.87%
2008	4,310	55.97%	3,244	42.12%	147	1.91%
2012	4,698	61.85%	2,782	36.62%	116	1.53%
2016	5,290	66.99%	2,227	28.20%	380	4.81%
2020	5,944	67.13%	2,725	30.77%	186	2.10%
2024	6,160	69.40%	2,548	28.71%	168	1.89%

== See also ==
- National Register of Historic Places listings in Union County, South Dakota
