= Spink Township, Union County, South Dakota =

Spink Township
- Township
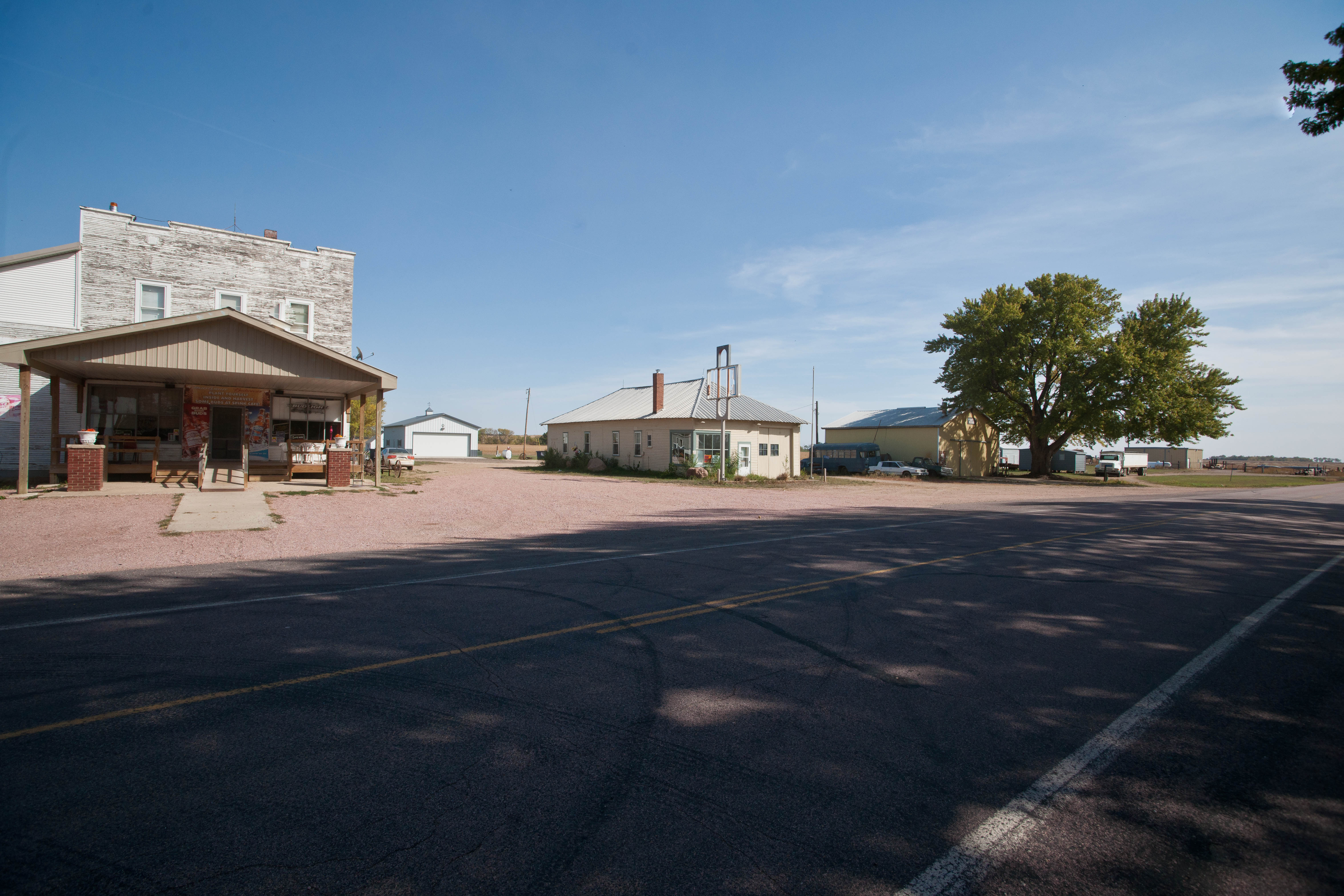
- Street in Spink

- Location within the state of South Dakota
- Coordinates: 42°51′07″N 96°44′49″W
- Country: United States
- State: South Dakota
- County: Union

Population (2000)
  - Total: 245
- Time zone: UTC-6 (Central (CST))
  - Summer (DST): UTC-5 (CDT)

Spink Township is a township in Union County, South Dakota, United States. Its population was 245 at the 2000 census.

Located in western Union County, Spink Township borders the following other townships:

- Emmet Township — north
- Big Springs Township — northeastern corner
- Sioux Valley Township — east
- Richland Township — southeastern corner
- Brule Township — south
- Fairview Township, Clay County — southwestern corner
- Prairie Center Township, Clay County — west
- Garfield Township, Clay County — northwestern corner

A community, also named Spink, was established in the township in 1871. At its peak, the community was strong enough to compete for the title of county seat.

Toward the end of the 20th century only a few business remained in the community of Spink. The Spink Cafe was the center of life in the township and was still a place where farmers would gather. Gary's Repair was a place where people could get the truck or tractor a little work and the old Co-Op that went by the name of Spink Oil was the town's gas station. Spink Oil closed in 1997 and the Spink Cafe was destroyed in a fire in 2019. Today a few homes remain, along with storage facilities for the Union County Dept. of Transportation and a Valley Ag plant and distributor.

A proposed refinery by Hyperion Refining, LLC is now working to build the nation's first new oil refinery in years in the United States, this proposed refinery has created a large split in the corn and bean farmers of Union County. A few family farms were given money for options on the land that makes up the family farms that have been a part of the county since the late 19th century. This split lead to the formation of the save union county group and attracted a lot of media attention.
