= List of census-designated places in South Dakota =

Map of the United States with South Dakota highlighted

Census-designated places (CDPs) are unincorporated communities lacking elected municipal officers and boundaries with legal status. South Dakota has 130 census-designated places.

== Census-designated places ==
Population data based on the 2025 estimates.

2025 Rank	CDP	2025 Estimate	2020 Census	Change	County
1	Rapid Valley	6,983	8,098	−13.77%	Pennington
2	Dakota Dunes	4,764	4,020	+18.51%	Union
3	Blackhawk	2,792	3,026	−7.73%	Meade
4	Pine Ridge	2,353	3,138	−25.02%	Oglala Lakota
5	Colonial Pine Hills	2,325	1,903	+22.18%	Pennington
6	North Spearfish	2,198	2,366	−7.10%	Lawrence
7	Rosebud	1,729	1,455	+18.83%	Todd
8	Oglala	1,649	1,282	+28.63%	Oglala Lakota
9	Kyle	1,595	943	+69.14%	Oglala Lakota
10	Green Valley	1,591	1,051	+51.38%	Pennington
11	North Eagle Butte	1,352	1,879	−28.05%	Dewey
12	Ashland Heights	1,202	678	+77.29%	Pennington
13	Fort Thompson	1,111	1,224	−9.23%	Buffalo
14	Mina	1,025	554	+85.02%	Edmunds
15	Agency Village	1,023	776	+31.83%	Roberts
16	Meadow View Addition	933	531	+75.71%	Minnehaha
17	Allen	928	460	+101.74%	Bennett
18	Lake Madison	916	829	+10.49%	Lake
19	Wonderland Homes	902	718	+25.63%	Meade
20	Lower Brule	802	703	+14.08%	Lyman
21	Wanblee	747	674	+10.83%	Jackson
22	Manderson-White Horse Creek	738	554	+33.21%	Oglala Lakota
23	Blucksberg Mountain	717	467	+53.53%	Meade
24	Johnson Siding	673	614	+9.61%	Pennington
25	Shindler	661	607	+8.90%	Lincoln
26	Parmelee	649	606	+7.10%	Todd
27	Antelope	577	830	−30.48%	Todd
28	Prairiewood Village	572	303	+88.78%	Brown
29	Boulder Canyon	562	561	+0.18%	Lawrence
30	West Brule	556	538	+3.35%	Lyman
31	Oahe Acres	511	503	+1.59%	Hughes
32	Wounded Knee	500	364	+37.36%	Oglala Lakota
33	Mountain Plains	475	327	+45.26%	Lawrence
34	Porcupine	470	925	−49.19%	Oglala Lakota
35	Two Strike	427	282	+51.42%	Todd
36	Anderson	411	388	+5.93%	Minnehaha
37	Sicangu Village	404	276	+46.38%	Todd
38	Lake Poinsett	401	501	−19.96%	Brookings; Hamlin
39	Little Eagle	369	367	+0.54%	Corson
40	Spring Creek	348	236	+47.46%	Todd
41	Enemy Swim	336	310	+8.39%	Day
42	Crook City	321	132	+143.18%	Lawrence
43	La Plant	281	167	+68.26%	Dewey
44	Soldier Creek	278	205	+35.61%	Todd
45	Bullhead	275	308	−10.71%	Corson
46	Brant Lake South	242	140	+72.86%	Lake
47	Renner Corner	240	347	−30.84%	Minnehaha
48	Horse Creek	237	187	+26.74%	Mellette
49	Marty	235	677	−65.29%	Charles Mix
50	Pine Lakes Addition	232	306	−24.18%	Minnehaha
51	White Horse	223	234	−4.70%	Todd
52	Swift Bird	211	117	+80.34%	Dewey
53	Chester	208	257	−19.07%	Lake
54	Glendale Colony	204	176	+15.91%	Spink
55	Richland	194	97	+100.00%	Union
56	Spring Creek Colony	186	229	−18.78%	McPherson
57	Burbank	183	93	+96.77%	Clay
58	Wakpala	183	267	−31.46%	Corson
59	Cherry Creek	182	282	−35.46%	Ziebach
60	Long Hollow	161	265	−39.25%	Roberts
61	Rowena	158	68	+132.35%	Minnehaha
62	Corn Creek	153	113	+35.40%	Mellette
63	Kenel	143	130	+10.00%	Corson
64	Okreek	140	190	−26.32%	Todd
65	Angostura	132	159	−16.98%	Fall River
66	Whitehorse	125	106	+17.92%	Dewey
67	Peever Flats	123	129	−4.65%	Roberts
68	Tschetter Colony	111	165	−32.73%	Hutchinson
69	Norris	110	150	−26.67%	Mellette
70	Lyons	108	70	+54.29%	Minnehaha
71	Bath	107	142	−24.65%	Brown
72	Millerdale Colony	98	129	−24.03%	Hand
73	Mayfield Colony	97	146	−33.56%	Clark
74	Golden View Colony	95	95	0.00%	McCook
75	Bath Corner	93	51	+82.35%	Brown
76	Green Grass	92	21	+338.10%	Dewey
77	Running Water	92	47	+95.74%	Bon Homme
78	Bridger	83	48	+72.92%	Ziebach
79	Vale	83	130	−36.15%	Butte
80	Clearfield Colony	81	99	−18.18%	Charles Mix
81	Kaylor	78	30	+160.00%	Hutchinson
82	Jamesville Colony	76	110	−30.91%	Yankton
83	Morningside	75	70	+7.14%	Beadle
84	Shamrock Colony	75	88	−14.77%	Beadle
85	Cow Creek	74	52	+42.31%	Sully
86	Meckling	74	48	+54.17%	Clay
87	Clark Colony	73	92	−20.65%	Spink
88	Brentwood Colony	70	116	−39.66%	Faulk
89	Sunset Colony	70	142	−50.70%	Marshall
90	Evergreen Colony	68	111	−38.74%	Faulk
91	Cameron Colony	67	79	−15.19%	Turner
92	Millbrook Colony	62	98	−36.73%	Hanson
93	Old Elm Spring Colony	52	114	−54.39%	Hutchinson
94	Spink Colony	50	135	−62.96%	Spink
95	Okaton	47	31	+51.61%	Jones
96	Forestburg	46	54	−14.81%	Sanborn
97	New Elm Spring Colony	46	100	−54.00%	Hutchinson
98	Ideal	45	86	−47.67%	Tripp
99	Spring Lake Colony	44	121	−63.64%	Kingsbury
100	Oak Lane Colony	43	138	−68.84%	Hanson
101	Grassland Colony	42	127	−66.93%	McPherson
102	Orland Colony	42	2	+2,000.00%	McCook
103	Rustic Acres Colony	38	132	−71.21%	Lake
104	Clear Lake	35	170	−79.41%	Marshall
105	Caputa	33	32	+3.13%	Pennington
106	Mansfield	33	86	−61.63%	Brown; Spink
107	Winfred	33	38	−13.16%	Lake
108	Rockport Colony	29	77	−62.34%	Hanson
109	Crocker	28	19	+47.37%	Clark
110	Vivian	27	98	−72.45%	Lyman
111	Smithwick	25	39	−35.90%	Fall River
112	Fedora	24	26	−7.69%	Miner
113	Maverick Junction	24	46	−47.83%	Fall River
114	St. Onge	24	170	−85.88%	Lawrence
115	Waverly	24	22	+9.09%	Codington
116	Prairie City	21	25	−16.00%	Perkins
117	Aurora Center	15	22	−31.82%	Aurora
118	Oral	14	66	−78.79%	Fall River
119	St. Charles	13	15	−13.33%	Gregory
120	Kidder	12	25	−52.00%	Marshall
121	Dudley	10	28	−64.29%	Fall River
122	Stephan	8	68	−88.24%	Hyde
123	Harrison	7	55	−87.27%	Douglas
124	Gann Valley †	6	10	−40.00%	Buffalo
125	Loomis	6	33	−81.82%	Davison
126	Milltown	6	8	−25.00%	Hutchinson
127	New Holland	5	77	−93.51%	Douglas
128	Storla	5	6	−16.67%	Aurora
129	Lantry	3	33	−90.91%	Dewey
130	Ferney	1	42	−97.62%	Brown

== Unincorporated community ==
2025 Rank	Unincorporated community	2025 Estimate UC	2020 Census CDP	Change	County
131	Ardmore	0	1	−100.00%	Fall River
132	Bijou Hills	0	2	−100.00%	Brule
133	Blumengard Colony	0	0	NA	Faulk
134	Bon Homme Colony	0	97	−100.00%	Bon Homme
135	Camrose Colony	0	76	−100.00%	Spink
136	Cedar Grove Colony	0	0	NA	Brule
137	Claremont Colony	0	68	−100.00%	Hamlin
138	Cloverleaf Colony	0	16	−100.00%	Miner
139	Collins Colony	0	92	−100.00%	Clark
140	Deerfield Colony	0	128	−100.00%	Edmunds
141	Fordham Colony	0	0	NA	Clark
142	Graceville Colony	0	21	−100.00%	Lake
143	Grass Ranch Colony	0	14	−100.00%	Brule
144	Greenwood Colony	0	11	−100.00%	Douglas
145	Hamill	0	14	−100.00%	Tripp
146	Hillcrest Colony	0	94	−100.00%	Clark
147	Hillside Colony	0	123	−100.00%	Spink
148	Huron Colony	0	2	−100.00%	Beadle
149	Hutterville Colony	0	95	−100.00%	Brown
150	Lakeview Colony	0	0	NA	Charles Mix
151	Long Lake Colony	0	8	−100.00%	McPherson
152	Maxwell Colony	0	254	−100.00%	Hutchinson
153	Newport Colony	0	114	−100.00%	Marshall
154	Newdale Colony	0	6	−100.00%	Brookings
155	Norfeld Colony	0	9	−100.00%	Brookings
156	Ola	0	15	−100.00%	Brule
157	Pearl Creek Colony	0	99	−100.00%	Beadle
158	Pembrook Colony	0	135	−100.00%	Edmunds
159	Plainview Colony	0	100	−100.00%	Edmunds
160	Platte Colony	0	299	−100.00%	Charles Mix
161	Pleasant Valley Colony	0	6	−100.00%	Moody
162	Poinsett Colony	0	5	−100.00%	Hamlin
163	Provo	0	10	−100.00%	Fall River
164	Riverside Colony	0	72	−100.00%	Beadle
165	Rolland Colony	0	53	−100.00%	Brookings
166	Rosedale Colony	0	0	NA	Hanson
167	Roswell	0	8	−100.00%	Miner
168	Shannon Colony	0	1	−100.00%	Miner
169	Silver Lake Colony	0	7	−100.00%	Clark
170	Spring Valley Colony	0	0	NA	Jerauld
171	Thunderbird Colony	0	7	−100.00%	Faulk
172	Upland Colony	0	178	−100.00%	Sanborn
173	Westwood Colony	0	8	−100.00%	Marshall
174	White Rock Colony	0	0	NA	Roberts
175	Wolf Creek Colony	0	0	NA	Hutchinson
