= National Register of Historic Places listings in Lake County, South Dakota =

Location of Lake County in South Dakota

This is a list of the National Register of Historic Places listings in Lake County, South Dakota.

This is intended to be a complete list of the properties and districts on the National Register of Historic Places in Lake County, South Dakota, United States. The locations of National Register properties and districts for which the latitude and longitude coordinates are included below, may be seen in a map.

There are 17 properties and districts listed on the National Register in the county.

This National Park Service list is complete through NPS recent listings posted May 8, 2026.

== Current listings ==
	Name on the Register	Image	Date listed	Location	City or town	Description
1	Chapel Emmanuel Railroad Car	Chapel Emmanuel Railroad Car	September 8, 1976 (#76001740)	West of Madison on U.S. Route 81 in Prairie Village; 44°00′26″N 97°09′57″W	Madison	
2	Chicago, Milwaukee, St. Paul, and Pacific Railroad Depot	Chicago, Milwaukee, St. Paul, and Pacific Railroad Depot	October 19, 1989 (#89001719)	315 S. Egan; 44°00′10″N 97°06′52″W	Madison	
3	Matthew W. Daly House		July 13, 1988 (#88000571)	102 NE. 9th St. 44°00′55″N 97°06′47″W	Madison	
4	J. Whitney Goff Round Barn	J. Whitney Goff Round Barn	May 19, 2004 (#04000469)	44520 236th St. 43°57′52″N 97°22′13″W	Winfred	
5	Abraham Hegdahl Farm		January 28, 2004 (#03001526)	22808 U.S. Route 81; 44°04′43″N 97°07′37″W	Madison	
6	Herschell-Spillman Steam Riding Gallery		December 6, 2016 (#16000825)	45205 US 81; 44°00′27″N 97°08′55″W	Madison vicinity	
7	Lake Badus Rural Agricultural Historic District		June 24, 2003 (#02001428)	Roughly bounded by U.S. Route 81 and County Roads 16, 37, and 20; 44°09′17″N 97°06′00″W	Nunda	
8	Lake County Courthouse	Lake County Courthouse	February 10, 1993 (#92001861)	Center St. between Harth and Lee Aves. 44°00′20″N 97°06′41″W	Madison	
9	Lake Madison Lutheran Church		October 12, 2000 (#00001220)	5.5 miles southeast of Madison; 44°04′51″N 97°02′37″W	Madison	
10	Herman Luce Cabin	Herman Luce Cabin	January 30, 1978 (#78002561)	Lake Herman State Park; 43°59′29″N 97°09′57″W	Madison	
11	William A. Mackay House		June 3, 1976 (#76001741)	304 NE. 4th St. 44°00′34″N 97°06′37″W	Madison	
12	Madison Historic District		May 11, 1976 (#76001742)	Bounded roughly by both sides of Egan Ave., Washington, and 4th and 7th Sts. 44°00′39″N 97°06′43″W	Madison	
13	Madison Masonic Temple		January 26, 1990 (#89002335)	229 N. Egan Ave. 44°00′25″N 97°06′48″W	Madison	
14	St. Ann's Catholic Church of Badus		August 7, 1979 (#79002403)	Northeast of Ramona; 44°08′51″N 97°08′28″W	Ramona	
15	St. William's Catholic Church		February 12, 1999 (#99000203)	3rd St. 44°07′07″N 97°13′01″W	Ramona	
16	Laura A. Smith House		May 11, 2026 (#100012984)	519 N Lee Ave; 44°00′36″N 97°06′41″W	Madison	
17	Washington School		June 28, 2010 (#10000411)	514 North Washington; 44°00′34″N 97°06′34″W	Madison	1924 building representative of school design of 1920s South Dakota

== See also ==
- List of National Historic Landmarks in South Dakota
- National Register of Historic Places listings in South Dakota
