= Lake Madison, South Dakota =

- Census-designated place
- Location within South Dakota Location within the United States
- Coordinates: 43°57′14″N 97°00′17″W
- Country: United States
- State: South Dakota
- County: Lake

Area
  - Total: 9.10 sq mi (23.58 km^{2})
  - Land: 4.72 sq mi (12.23 km^{2})
  - Water: 4.38 sq mi (11.35 km^{2})
- Elevation: 1,604 ft (489 m)

Population (2020)
  - Total: 829
  - Density: 176/sq mi (67.8/km^{2})
- Time zone: UTC-6 (Central (CST))
  - Summer (DST): UTC-5 (CDT)
- Area code: 605
- GNIS feature ID: 2584557
- FIPS code: 46-35430

Lake Madison is an unincorporated community and census-designated place in Lake County, South Dakota, United States. Its population was 829 as of the 2020 census. The community is located on the shores of Lake Madison.

Lake Madison provides many activities including camping, boating, and fishing.

== Geography ==
The community is in southeastern Lake County, surrounding Lake Madison. The CDP is 3 to 10 miles (5 to 16 km) southeast of Madison, the county seat. South Dakota Highway 34 forms the northern edge of the CDP. The highway leads west into Madison and east 13 miles (21 km) to Interstate 29.

According to the U.S. Census Bureau, the community has an area of 9.104 square miles (23.58 km^{2}); 4.749 square miles (12.30 km^{2}) of its area is land, and 4.355 square miles (11.28 km^{2}) is water. Lake Madison drains to the southeast, into Round Lake and then Brant Lake, and is part of the Big Sioux River watershed.

== Demographics ==
Historical population
Census	Pop.	Note	%±
2020	829		—
U.S. Decennial Census

== Education ==
The majority of Lake Madison is in the Madison Central School District 39-2, while portions are in the Chester Area School District 39-1.
