= Graceville Colony, South Dakota =

Gracevale Colony, South Dakota
- Census-designated place
- Location within South Dakota Location within the United States
- Coordinates: 43°55′44″N 97°17′02″W
- Country: United States
- State: South Dakota
- County: Lake

Area
  - Total: 0.46 sq mi (1.18 km^{2})
  - Land: 0.46 sq mi (1.18 km^{2})
  - Water: 0 sq mi (0.00 km^{2})
- Elevation: 1,578 ft (481 m)

Population (2020)
  - Total: 21
  - Density: 46.0/sq mi (17.76/km^{2})
- Time zone: UTC-6 (Central (CST))
  - Summer (DST): UTC-5 (CDT)
- ZIP Code: 57076 (Winfred)
- Area code: 605
- FIPS code: 46-25020
- GNIS feature ID: 2813041

Gracevale Colony is a census-designated place (CDP) corresponding to the Gracevale Hutterite colony in Lake County, South Dakota, United States. The population was 21 at the 2020 census. It was first listed as a CDP prior to the 2020 census.

It is in the southwest part of the county, on the east side of the East Fork of the Vermillion River, a south-flowing tributary of the Missouri River. It is 8 miles (13 km) southeast of Winfred and 14 miles (23 km) southwest of Madison, the county seat.

== Demographics ==
Historical population
Census	Pop.	Note	%±
2020	21		—
U.S. Decennial Census

== Education ==
It is in the Madison Central School District 39-2.
