= Brant Lake South, South Dakota =

- Census-designated place
- Location in South Dakota Location in the United States
- Coordinates: 43°54′38″N 96°56′11″W
- Country: United States
- State: South Dakota
- County: Lake

Area
  - Total: 1.03 sq mi (2.67 km^{2})
  - Land: 0.53 sq mi (1.36 km^{2})
  - Water: 0.51 sq mi (1.31 km^{2})
- Elevation: 1,620 ft (490 m)

Population (2020)
  - Total: 140
  - Density: 266.6/sq mi (102.93/km^{2})
- Time zone: UTC-6 (Central (CST))
  - Summer (DST): UTC-5 (CDT)
- FIPS code: 46-07044

Brant Lake South is a census-designated place (CDP) in Lake County, South Dakota, United States. The population was 140 at the 2020 census. It was established after the 2010 census.

== Geography ==
Brant Lake South is in southeastern Lake County, on the south side of Brant Lake. It is bordered to the north by the town of Brant Lake and to the south by the unincorporated community of Chester. Madison, the county seat, is 13 miles (21 km) to the northwest.

According to the U.S. Census Bureau, the Brant Lake South CDP has an area of 1.0 square mile (2.7 km^{2}), of which 0.54 square miles (1.4 km^{2}) are land and 0.50 square miles (1.3 km^{2}), comprising the southeastern portion of Brant Lake, are water. Skunk Creek, the outlet of Brant Lake, passes through the southwest corner of the CDP and flows south to the Big Sioux River at Sioux Falls.

== Demographics ==
Historical population
Census	Pop.	Note	%±
2020	140		—
U.S. Decennial Census

== Education ==
It is in the Chester School District 39-1.
