= Wentworth, South Dakota =

- Village
- Location in Lake County and the state of South Dakota
- Coordinates: 43°59′55″N 96°57′52″W
- Country: United States
- State: South Dakota
- County: Lake
- Incorporated: 1896

Area
  - Total: 0.25 sq mi (0.66 km^{2})
  - Land: 0.25 sq mi (0.66 km^{2})
  - Water: 0 sq mi (0.00 km^{2})
- Elevation: 1,696 ft (517 m)

Population (2020)
  - Total: 181
  - Density: 712.7/sq mi (275.19/km^{2})
- Time zone: UTC-6 (Central (CST))
  - Summer (DST): UTC-5 (CDT)
- ZIP code: 57075
- Area code: 605
- FIPS code: 46-70020
- GNIS feature ID: 1267630
- Website: wentworthsd.com

Wentworth is an incorporated village in Lake County, South Dakota, United States. The population was 181 at the 2020 census.

== History ==
Wentworth was platted in 1881, and named for the local Wentworth family, the original owner of the town site. It is known for being the mailing address of the cabins and vacation homes around Lake Madison, South Dakota.

== Geography ==
According to the United States Census Bureau, the village has a total area of 0.25 square miles (0.65 km^{2}), all land.

The town is near Milwaukee Lake.

== Demographics ==
Historical population
Census	Pop.	Note	%±
1900	181		—
1910	329		81.8%
1920	360		9.4%
1930	310		−13.9%
1940	303		−2.3%
1950	270		−10.9%
1960	211		−21.9%
1970	196		−7.1%
1980	193		−1.5%
1990	181		−6.2%
2000	188		3.9%
2010	171		−9.0%
2020	181		5.8%
U.S. Decennial Census

=== 2020 census ===
As of the census of 2020, there were 181 people, 74 households, and 63 families residing in the village. The population density was 603.3 inhabitants per square mile (232.8/km^{2}).

=== 2010 census ===
As of the census of 2010, there were 171 people, 75 households, and 46 families residing in the village. The population density was 684.0 inhabitants per square mile (264.1/km^{2}). There were 86 housing units at an average density of 344.0 per square mile (132.8/km^{2}). The racial makeup of the village was 99.4% White and 0.6% Native American. Hispanic or Latino of any race were 0.6% of the population.

There were 75 households, out of which 21.3% had children under the age of 18 living with them, 45.3% were married couples living together, 13.3% had a female householder with no husband present, 2.7% had a male householder with no wife present, and 38.7% were non-families. 33.3% of all households were made up of individuals, and 9.3% had someone living alone who was 65 years of age or older. The average household size was 2.28 and the average family size was 2.96.

The median age in the village was 41.4 years. 23.4% of residents were under the age of 18; 5.8% were between the ages of 18 and 24; 27.5% were from 25 to 44; 30.4% were from 45 to 64; and 12.9% were 65 years of age or older. The gender makeup of the village was 49.7% male and 50.3% female.

=== 2000 census ===
As of the census of 2000, there were 188 people, 83 households, and 54 families residing in the village. The population density was 741.6 inhabitants per square mile (286.3/km^{2}). There were 90 housing units at an average density of 355.0 per square mile (137.1/km^{2}). The racial makeup of the city was 96.81% White, 1.60% Native American, 0.53% Asian, and 1.06% from two or more races.

There were 83 households, out of which 26.5% had children under the age of 18 living with them, 50.6% were married couples living together, 9.6% had a female householder with no husband present, and 34.9% were non-families. 25.3% of all households were made up of individuals, and 8.4% had someone living alone who was 65 years of age or older. The average household size was 2.27 and the average family size was 2.70.

In the city, the population was spread out, with 21.3% under the age of 18, 11.2% from 18 to 24, 21.8% from 25 to 44, 30.3% from 45 to 64, and 15.4% who were 65 years of age or older. The median age was 42 years. For every 100 females, there were 104.3 males. For every 100 females age 18 and over, there were 108.5 males.

The median income for a household in the city was $33,438, and the median income for a family was $36,042. Males had a median income of $31,000 versus $22,500 for females. The per capita income for the city was $18,097. None of the families and 8.6% of the population were living below the poverty line.

== Education ==
It is in the Chester Area School District 39-1.
