= Madison Masonic Temple =

Madison Masonic Temple may refer to:

- Madison Masonic Temple (Madison, South Dakota)
- Madison Masonic Temple (Madison, Wisconsin)
