= Rustic Acres Colony, South Dakota =

- Census-designated place
- Location within South Dakota Location within the United States
- Coordinates: 43°52′22″N 97°05′56″W
- Country: United States
- State: South Dakota
- County: Lake

Area
  - Total: 1.00 sq mi (2.59 km^{2})
  - Land: 1.00 sq mi (2.59 km^{2})
  - Water: 0 sq mi (0.00 km^{2})
- Elevation: 1,740 ft (530 m)

Population (2020)
  - Total: 132
  - Density: 131.9/sq mi (50.91/km^{2})
- Time zone: UTC-6 (Central (CST))
  - Summer (DST): UTC-5 (CDT)
- ZIP Code: 57042 (Madison)
- Area code: 605
- FIPS code: 46-56964
- GNIS feature ID: 2813040

Rustic Acres Colony is a Hutterite colony and census-designated place (CDP) in Lake County, South Dakota, United States. The population was 132 at the 2020 census. It was first listed as a CDP prior to the 2020 census.

It is in the southern part of the county, 11 miles (18 km) south of Madison, the county seat.

== Demographics ==
Historical population
Census	Pop.	Note	%±
2020	132		—
U.S. Decennial Census

== Education ==
It is in the Chester School District 39-1.
