= Aurora Center, South Dakota =

- CDP
- Location in Aurora County and the state of South Dakota
- Coordinates: 43°31′38″N 98°35′22″W
- Country: United States
- State: South Dakota
- County: Aurora
- Township: Center

Area
  - Total: 0.042 sq mi (0.11 km^{2})
  - Land: 0.042 sq mi (0.11 km^{2})
  - Water: 0 sq mi (0.00 km^{2})
- Elevation: 1,650 ft (500 m)

Population (2020)
  - Total: 22
  - Density: 510.1/sq mi (196.97/km^{2})
- Time zone: UTC-6 (Central (CST))
  - Summer (DST): UTC-5 (CDT)
- ZIP code: 57375
- Area code: 605
- FIPS code: 46-02860
- GNIS feature ID: 2393323

Aurora Center is a census-designated place (CDP) in Aurora County, South Dakota, United States. The population was 22 at the 2020 census.

== Geography ==
According to the United States Census Bureau, the CDP has a total area of 0.1 square miles (0.26 km^{2}), all land.

== Demographics ==
Historical population
Census	Pop.	Note	%±
2020	22		—
U.S. Decennial Census

As of the census of 2000, there were 7 people, 3 households, and 0 families residing in the CDP. The population density was 55.3 inhabitants per square mile (21.4/km^{2}). There were 3 housing units at an average density of 23.7 units per square mile (9.2 units/km^{2}). The racial makeup of the CDP was 100.00% White.

There were 3 households, out of which 33.3% had children under the age of 18 living with them, 33.3% were married couples living together, and 66.7% were non-families. 33.3% of all households were made up of individuals, and 33.3% had someone living alone who was 65 years of age or older. The average household size was 2.33 and the average family size was 4.00.

In the CDP, the population was spread out, with 42.9% under the age of 18, 42.9% from 18 to 24, and 14.3% who were 65 years of age or older. The median age was 21 years. For every 100 females, there were 250.0 males. For every 100 females age 18 and over, there were 100.0 males.

The median income for a household in the CDP was $4,583, and the median income for a family was $0. Males had a median income of $0 versus $0 for females. The per capita income for the CDP was $4,700. There were no families living below the poverty line and 66.7% of the population, including none under 18 and none of those over 64.

== See also ==
- List of census-designated places in South Dakota
