= Storla, South Dakota =

- CDP
- Location in Aurora County and the state of South Dakota
- Coordinates: 43°51′45″N 98°21′09″W
- Country: United States
- State: South Dakota
- County: Aurora
- Township: Belford

Area
  - Total: 0.13 sq mi (0.33 km^{2})
  - Land: 0.13 sq mi (0.33 km^{2})
  - Water: 0 sq mi (0.00 km^{2})
- Elevation: 1,365 ft (416 m)

Population (2020)
  - Total: 6
  - Density: 47.8/sq mi (18.44/km^{2})
- Time zone: UTC-6 (Central (CST))
  - Summer (DST): UTC-5 (CDT)
- Area code: 605
- FIPS code: 46-61940
- GNIS feature ID: 2393250

Storla is a census-designated place (CDP) in Aurora County, South Dakota, United States. It was established by the United States Census Bureau for its use with the 2020 United States Census. As of the 2020 census, Storla had a population of 6.

== Geography ==
According to the United States Census Bureau, the CDP has a total area of 0.0 square miles (0 km^{2}), all land.

== Demographics ==
Historical population
Census	Pop.	Note	%±
2000	15		—
2010	6		−60.0%
2020	6		0.0%
U.S. Decennial Census

As of the census of 2000, there were 15 people, 7 households, and 4 families residing in the CDP. The population density was 348.5 inhabitants per square mile (134.6/km^{2}). There were 9 housing units at an average density of 209.1 units per square mile (80.7 units/km^{2}). The racial makeup of the CDP was 73.33% White, 6.67% Asian, and 20.00% from two or more races.

There were 7 households, out of which 14.3% had children under the age of 18 living with them, 57.1% were married couples living together, 14.3% had a female householder with no husband present, and 28.6% were non-families. 28.6% of all households were made up of individuals, and 28.6% had someone living alone who was 65 years of age or older. The average household size was 2.14 and the average family size was 2.60.

In the CDP, the population was spread out, with 20.0% under the age of 18, 6.7% from 25 to 44, 20.0% from 45 to 64, and 53.3% who were 65 years of age or older. The median age was 76 years. For every 100 females, there were 87.5 males. For every 100 females age 18 and over, there were 71.4 males.

The median income for a household in the CDP was $9,583, and the median income for a family was $15,625. Males had a median income of $0 versus $0 for females. The per capita income for the CDP was $5,014. There are 66.7% of families living below the poverty line and 66.7% of the population, including all under 18 and 36.4% of those over 64.

== See also ==
- List of census-designated places in South Dakota
