= Lake Madison Lutheran Church =

Historic church in South Dakota, United States

- U.S. National Register of Historic Places
- Location within South Dakota Location within the United States
- Nearest city: Madison, South Dakota
- Coordinates: 44°4′51″N 97°2′37″W
- Area: 2.5 acres (1.0 ha)
- Built: 1898
- Architectural style: Gothic Revival
- NRHP reference No.: 00001220
- Added to NRHP: October 12, 2000

Lake Madison Lutheran Church is a historic church in Lake County, South Dakota near Madison, about 7.5 miles (12.1 km) to the northeast of the town. The church was completed in 1898 and was added to the National Register of Historic Places in 2000.

The church was organized in 1878 and held services in a sod house. It served Norwegian immigrants. The present church building was begun in 1890 and was completed in 1898.
