= 2000 United States presidential election in South Dakota =

- November 7, 2000
- Turnout: 68.4% (of registered voters) ▼3.2 pp 58.3% (of voting age population) ▼3.8 pp

Nominee	George W. Bush	Al Gore
Party	Republican	Democratic
Home state	Texas	Tennessee
Running mate	Dick Cheney	Joe Lieberman
Electoral vote	3	0
Popular vote	190,700	118,804
Percentage	60.30%	37.56%
County results
Bush
40–50%
50–60%
60–70%
70–80%
80–90%
Gore
50–60%
60–70%
80–90%
President before election
Bill Clinton
Democratic
Elected President
George W. Bush
Republican

The 2000 United States presidential election in South Dakota took place on November 7, 2000, and was part of the 2000 United States presidential election. Voters chose three representatives, or electors, to the Electoral College, who voted for president and vice president.

South Dakota was won by Governor George W. Bush by a 22.74 point margin of victory.

== General election ==
=== Polling ===
Poll source	Date(s)	Sample size	Margin of error	George W. Bush (R)	Al Gore (D)	Other / undecided (Note: Calculated by taking the difference of 100% and all other candidates combined.)
Jim Meader (KELOLAND-TV)	October 23, 2000	506 (RV)	—	51%	33%	16%

=== Results ===
2000 United States presidential election in South Dakota
Party	Candidate	Votes	Percentage	Electoral votes
Republican	George W. Bush	190,700	60.30%	3
Democratic	Al Gore	118,804	37.56%	0
Reform	Pat Buchanan	3,322	1.05%	0
Independent	Howard Phillips	1,781	0.56%	0
Libertarian	Harry Browne	1,662	0.53%	0

==== Results by county ====
County	George W. Bush Republican		Al Gore Democratic		Various candidates Other parties		Margin		Total votes cast
County	#	%	#	%	#	%	#	%	Total votes cast
Aurora	847	59.94%	513	36.31%	53	3.75%	334	23.63%	1,413
Beadle	4,347	56.17%	3,216	41.56%	176	2.27%	1,131	14.61%	7,739
Bennett	712	63.80%	377	33.78%	27	2.42%	335	30.02%	1,116
Bon Homme	1,901	60.56%	1,162	37.02%	76	2.42%	739	23.54%	3,139
Brookings	6,212	56.55%	4,546	41.39%	226	2.06%	1,666	15.16%	10,984
Brown	9,060	54.72%	7,173	43.33%	323	1.95%	1,887	11.39%	16,556
Brule	1,268	58.51%	818	37.75%	81	3.74%	450	20.76%	2,167
Buffalo	140	34.31%	256	62.75%	12	2.94%	-116	-28.44%	408
Butte	2,760	74.82%	840	22.77%	89	2.41%	1,920	52.05%	3,689
Campbell	739	80.59%	147	16.03%	31	3.38%	592	64.56%	917
Charles Mix	2,205	61.61%	1,300	36.32%	74	2.07%	905	25.29%	3,579
Clark	1,272	60.34%	791	37.52%	45	2.14%	481	22.82%	2,108
Clay	2,363	46.29%	2,638	51.67%	104	2.04%	-275	-5.38%	5,105
Codington	6,718	60.32%	4,192	37.64%	228	2.04%	2,526	22.68%	11,138
Corson	629	50.60%	549	44.17%	65	5.23%	80	6.43%	1,243
Custer	2,495	69.83%	955	26.73%	123	3.44%	1,540	43.10%	3,573
Davison	4,445	59.05%	2,936	39.00%	147	1.95%	1,509	20.05%	7,528
Day	1,623	50.77%	1,492	46.67%	82	2.56%	131	4.10%	3,197
Deuel	1,245	55.98%	926	41.64%	53	2.38%	319	14.34%	2,224
Dewey	761	45.27%	880	52.35%	40	2.38%	-119	-7.08%	1,681
Douglas	1,311	76.71%	363	21.24%	35	2.05%	948	55.47%	1,709
Edmunds	1,257	63.29%	676	34.04%	53	2.67%	581	29.25%	1,986
Fall River	2,185	63.72%	1,133	33.04%	111	3.24%	1,052	30.68%	3,429
Faulk	904	68.02%	388	29.19%	37	2.79%	516	38.83%	1,329
Grant	2,235	58.36%	1,475	38.51%	120	3.13%	760	19.85%	3,830
Gregory	1,487	65.88%	718	31.81%	52	2.31%	769	34.07%	2,257
Haakon	938	83.08%	164	14.53%	27	2.39%	774	68.55%	1,129
Hamlin	1,731	63.57%	923	33.90%	69	2.53%	808	29.67%	2,723
Hand	1,419	69.87%	565	27.82%	47	2.31%	854	42.05%	2,031
Hanson	944	66.43%	457	32.16%	20	1.41%	487	34.27%	1,421
Harding	650	88.92%	64	8.76%	17	2.32%	586	80.16%	731
Hughes	5,188	68.86%	2,212	29.36%	134	1.78%	2,976	39.50%	7,534
Hutchinson	2,497	68.88%	1,052	29.02%	76	2.10%	1,445	39.86%	3,625
Hyde	592	70.90%	218	26.11%	25	2.99%	374	44.79%	835
Jackson	687	66.06%	319	30.67%	34	3.27%	368	35.39%	1,040
Jerauld	624	55.61%	468	41.71%	30	2.68%	156	13.90%	1,122
Jones	509	76.66%	137	20.63%	18	2.71%	372	56.03%	664
Kingsbury	1,612	59.11%	1,049	38.47%	66	2.42%	563	20.64%	2,727
Lake	2,724	52.85%	2,331	45.23%	99	1.92%	393	7.62%	5,154
Lawrence	6,327	67.27%	2,797	29.74%	282	2.99%	3,530	37.53%	9,406
Lincoln	6,546	62.01%	3,844	36.42%	166	1.57%	2,702	25.59%	10,556
Lyman	875	63.13%	482	34.78%	29	2.09%	393	28.35%	1,386
Marshall	1,097	52.77%	939	45.17%	43	2.06%	158	7.60%	2,079
McCook	1,610	61.19%	965	36.68%	56	2.13%	645	24.51%	2,631
McPherson	1,073	75.72%	295	20.82%	49	3.46%	778	54.90%	1,417
Meade	6,870	73.35%	2,267	24.20%	229	2.45%	4,603	49.15%	9,366
Mellette	495	67.53%	222	30.29%	16	2.18%	273	37.24%	733
Miner	724	57.19%	523	41.31%	19	1.50%	201	15.88%	1,266
Minnehaha	33,428	54.47%	27,042	44.06%	899	1.47%	6,386	10.41%	61,369
Moody	1,361	49.76%	1,318	48.19%	56	2.05%	43	1.57%	2,735
Pennington	24,696	67.55%	11,123	30.43%	738	2.02%	13,573	37.12%	36,557
Perkins	1,237	76.64%	297	18.40%	80	4.96%	940	58.24%	1,614
Potter	1,112	74.43%	356	23.83%	26	1.74%	756	50.60%	1,494
Roberts	2,237	54.91%	1,700	41.73%	137	3.36%	537	13.18%	4,074
Sanborn	767	60.49%	468	36.91%	33	2.60%	299	23.58%	1,268
Shannon	252	12.90%	1,667	85.36%	34	1.74%	-1,415	-72.46%	1,953
Spink	1,957	59.59%	1,274	38.79%	53	1.62%	683	20.80%	3,284
Stanley	955	69.15%	402	29.11%	24	1.74%	553	40.04%	1,381
Sully	633	72.68%	209	24.00%	29	3.32%	424	48.68%	871
Todd	478	31.99%	993	66.47%	23	1.54%	-515	-34.48%	1,494
Tripp	1,909	69.04%	799	28.90%	57	2.06%	1,110	40.14%	2,765
Turner	2,514	62.79%	1,414	35.31%	76	1.90%	1,100	27.48%	4,004
Union	3,265	56.57%	2,358	40.85%	149	2.58%	907	15.72%	5,772
Walworth	1,758	68.86%	721	28.24%	74	2.90%	1,037	40.62%	2,553
Yankton	4,904	56.11%	3,596	41.14%	240	2.75%	1,308	14.97%	8,740
Ziebach	384	53.26%	314	43.55%	23	3.19%	70	9.71%	721
Totals	190,700	60.30%	118,804	37.56%	6,765	2.14%	71,896	22.74%	316,269

===== Counties that flipped from Democratic to Republican =====
- Beadle (largest city: Huron)
- Bon Homme (largest city: Springfield)
- Brown (largest city: Aberdeen)
- Brule (largest city: Chamberlain)
- Charles Mix (largest city: Wagner)
- Corson (largest city: McLaughlin)
- Day (largest city: Webster)
- Deuel (largest city: Clear Lake)
- Grant (largest city: Milbank)
- Jerauld (largest city: Wessington Springs)
- Kingsbury (largest city: De Smet)
- Lake (largest city: Madison)
- Marshall (largest city: Britton)
- Miner (largest city: Howard)
- Minnehaha (largest city: Sioux Falls)
- Moody (largest city: Flandreau)
- Roberts (largest city: Sisseton)
- Sanborn (largest city: Woonsocket)
- Union (largest city: Dakota Dunes)
- Ziebach (largest city: Dupree)

==== By congressional district ====
Due to the state's low population, only one congressional district is allocated. This is called the at-large district, because it covers the entire state, and thus is equivalent to the statewide election results.

District	Bush	Gore	Representative
At-large	60.3%	37.6%	John Thune

== Electors ==
The electors of each state and the District of Columbia met on December 18, 2000 to cast their votes for president and vice president. The Electoral College itself never meets as one body. Instead the electors from each state and the District of Columbia met in their respective capitols.

The following were the members of the Electoral College from the state. All were pledged to and voted for George Bush and Dick Cheney:

- Carole Hillard
- William J. Janklow
- Joel Rosenthal

== See also ==
- Presidency of George W. Bush
- United States presidential elections in South Dakota
