= Milwaukee (disambiguation) =

Milwaukee is the largest city in the U.S. state of Wisconsin.

Milwaukee may also refer to:

== United States places ==
- Milwaukee County, Wisconsin
- Milwaukee (town), Wisconsin, a former town
- Milwaukee metropolitan area
- Milwaukee, North Carolina, an unincorporated community
- Milwaukee, Pennsylvania, an unincorporated community
- Milwaukie, Oregon, named after the city in Wisconsin
- Pasley, Missouri, an unincorporated community also known as Milwaukee, Missouri
- Milwaukee Junction, neighborhood in Detroit, Michigan
- Milwaukee Lake, a lake in South Dakota
- Milwaukee Peak, a mountain in Colorado
- Milwaukee River, the name of a river in Wisconsin
- Old Milwaukee East Colonia and Old Milwaukee West Colonia, two unincorporated communities in Webb County, Texas
- Zilwaukee, Michigan

== Other uses ==
- Milwaukee brace, a kind of back/body brace used for correcting scoliosis or kyphosis
- Milwaukee Deep, the deepest part of the Atlantic Ocean
- Milwaukee Panthers, the athletic program of the University of Wisconsin–Milwaukee
- Milwaukee protocol, a controversial treatment for rabies infection
- Milwaukee Tool, a manufacturer of heavy-duty portable electric power tools and accessories whose trademark incorporates the word Milwaukee and a lightning bolt
- Old Milwaukee, a brand of American beer first brewed in 1890
- Milwaukee's Best, a brand of American beer first brewed in 1895
- University of Wisconsin–Milwaukee
- Roman Catholic Archdiocese of Milwaukee, Wisconsin
- Episcopal Diocese of Milwaukee, Wisconsin
- Chicago, Milwaukee, St. Paul and Pacific Railroad, called The Milwaukee Road
- USS Milwaukee, the name of four United States Navy ships past and present
- SS Milwaukee, the name (or derivation) of nine steamships, including a car ferry shipwrecked in a storm while crossing Lake Michigan
- "Milwaukee", the early codename for the Apple Computer design project which was to become the Macintosh II
- Milwaukee (album), a 1985 album by American musician Elliott Murphy
