= Buffalo Slough =

Wetland in the state of South Dakota, United States

- Location within South Dakota Location within the United States
- Location: Lake County, South Dakota
- Coordinates: 43.8743°N 96.9390°W
- Basin countries: United States
- Surface area: 624 acres (2.53 km^{2})

U.S. National Natural Landmark
- Designated: 1980

Buffalo Slough is a glacial prairie pothole wetland, and adjacent patch of bluestem tallgrass prairie, in Lake County, South Dakota, United States. The complex is located near Chester in far eastern South Dakota. Owned by the State of South Dakota, the formation was listed as a National Natural Landmark in 1980.

== Description ==
The National Park Service describes Buffalo Slough as follows:

Buffalo Slough provides excellent examples of a prairie pothole (a product of glacial activity) with native emergent vegetation, and a native bluestem prairie. The site is used extensively by many species of waterfowl and small mammals.

The 624-acre parcel includes Andropogon gerardi tallgrass prairie, wetland, and open water, creating a diverse hyperlocal ecosystem.
