= Junius, South Dakota =

Unincorporated community in South Dakota, U.S.

- Unincorporated community
- Location within South Dakota Location within the United States
- Coordinates: 44°0′07″N 97°2′44″W
- Country: United States
- State: South Dakota
- County: Lake
- Elevation: 1,749 ft (533 m)
- Time zone: UTC-6 (Central (CST))
  - Summer (DST): UTC-5 (CDT)
- ZIP code: 57057
- Area code: 605
- GNIS feature ID: 1267055

Junius is an unincorporated community in Lake County, in the U.S. state of South Dakota.

== History ==
Junius was originally called Midway, and under the latter name was laid out in 1878. The present name honors Junius, the son of a railroad official. A post office called Junius was established in 1904, and remained in operation until 1957.

On June 7th, 1993, an F4 tornado touched down near the community and passed just east of the area. 4 people were injured in the tornado, and it was part of the larger but poorly documented tornado outbreak from the 7th to the 9th.
