= 2012 United States presidential election in South Dakota =

- November 6, 2012
- Turnout: 69.21% (of registered voters) ▼3.79 pp 58.15% (of voting age population) ▼5.75 pp

Nominee	Mitt Romney	Barack Obama
Party	Republican	Democratic
Home state	Massachusetts	Illinois
Running mate	Paul Ryan	Joe Biden
Electoral vote	3	0
Popular vote	210,610	145,039
Percentage	57.89%	39.87%
County results
Romney
40–50%
50–60%
60–70%
70–80%
80–90%
Obama
50–60%
60–70%
70–80%
90–100%
President before election
Barack Obama
Democratic
Elected President
Barack Obama
Democratic

The 2012 United States presidential election in South Dakota took place on November 6, 2012, as part of the 2012 United States presidential election in which all 50 states plus the District of Columbia participated. South Dakota voters chose three electors to represent them in the Electoral College via a popular vote pitting incumbent Democratic President Barack Obama and his running mate, Vice President Joe Biden, against Republican challenger and former Massachusetts Governor Mitt Romney and his running mate, Congressman Paul Ryan.

Prior to the election, all seventeen news organizations making predictions for the election considered this a state Romney would win, or otherwise considered as a safe red state. South Dakota has not voted for a Democratic presidential nominee since Lyndon B. Johnson carried it in his 44-state landslide in 1964. South Dakota, just as all of the other states in the Great Plains, is among the most Republican states in the country. According to a 2012 Gallup poll, South Dakota is the 9th most conservative state in the country, with Republicans having an 11 percentage point advantage over Democrats in terms of party affiliation or identification. It is also the 10th whitest state in the country as of 2012, at 83.8%, and has the 4th highest gun ownership rate in the country at 56.6%, according to The Washington Post. Both of these voting blocs are relatively solid for the Republican Party.

While Obama lost the state by only 8.41% in 2008, illustrating a potential resurgence of Democratic strength among the agrarian population as seen in states such as Iowa, the state was returned to the safe Republican column in 2012. Romney won South Dakota by an 18.02% margin of victory. Romney was able to win back southeast Dakota: Obama became competitive there in 2008, when he won Minnehaha County (and many of its suburbs), home to the state's largest city of Sioux Falls, by only 587 votes. Romney carried upwards of 60% of the vote in many counties, with his best performance in the West River. He also flipped Brown County, where Aberdeen is.

Obama's best performance was in majority Native American counties in the west of the state. He carried 93.35% of the vote in Shannon County (now known as Oglala Lakota), home to the Pine Ridge Reservation and the Oglala Lakota tribe. The counties of Buffalo; Dewey; and Todd, where the Crow Creek; Cheyenne River and Standing Rock; and Rosebud reservations are located, respectively, also delivered great margins to the president. Clay County, home to the University of South Dakota, was the only county in the southeast to vote for Obama.

As of the 2024 presidential election, this is the last time in which the Democratic candidate won Corson County, Day County, Marshall County, and Roberts County.

== Primary elections ==
=== Republican primary ===
2012 South Dakota Republican presidential primary
- June 5, 2012

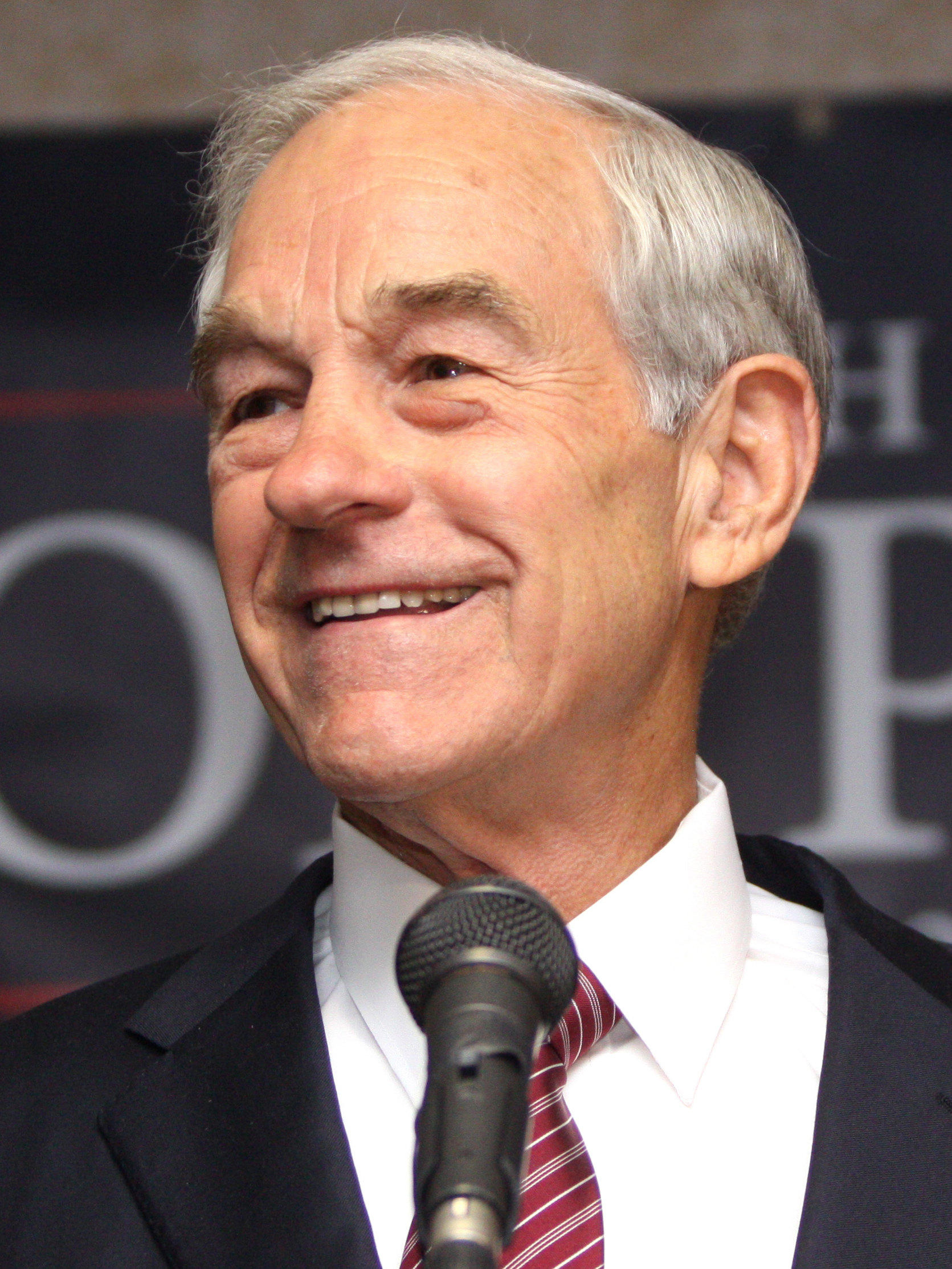

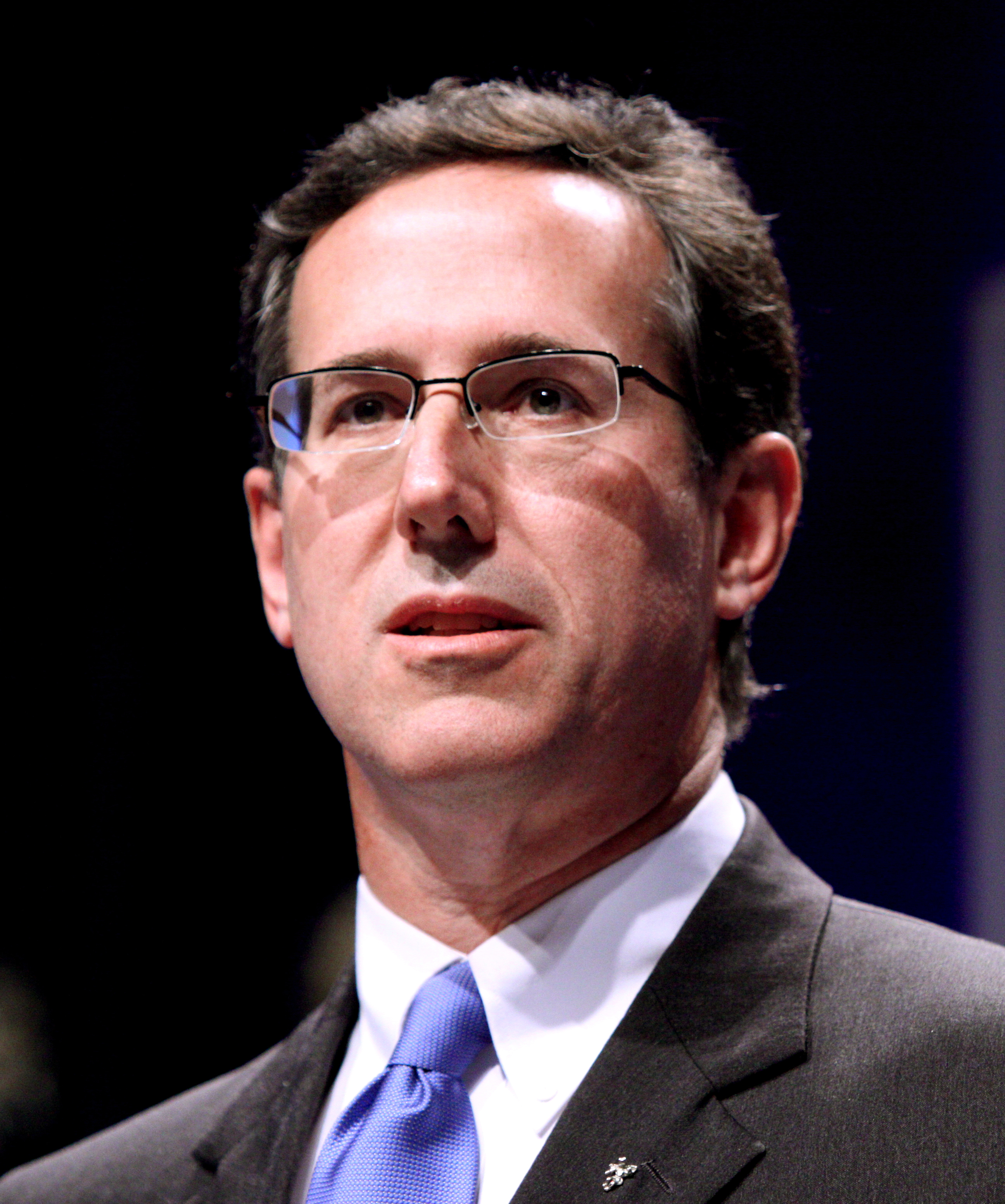

Candidate	Mitt Romney	Ron Paul
Home state	Massachusetts	Texas
Delegate count	25	0
Popular vote	34,033	6,704
Percentage	66.05%	13.01%
Candidate	Rick Santorum	Uncommitted
Home state	Pennsylvania	N/A
Delegate count	0	0
Popular vote	5,916	2,797
Percentage	11.48%	5.43%
- South Dakota results by county Mitt Romney (Note: Italicization indicates a withdrawn candidacy)

The Republican primary took place on June 5, 2012. 25 delegates will be chosen, for a total of 28 delegates to go to the national convention.

2012 South Dakota Republican primary
Candidate	Votes	Percentage	Delegates
Mitt Romney	34,033	66.1%	25
Ron Paul	6,704	13.01%	0
Rick Santorum	5,916	11.48%	0
Uncommitted	2,797	5.43%	0
Newt Gingrich	2,074	4.03%	0
Unpledged delegates:			3
Total:	51,524	100.0%	28

Key:	Withdrew prior to contest

== General election ==
=== Predictions ===
Source	Ranking	As of
Huffington Post	Safe R	November 6, 2012
CNN	Safe R	November 6, 2012
New York Times	Safe R	November 6, 2012
Washington Post	Safe R	November 6, 2012
RealClearPolitics	Solid R	November 6, 2012
Sabato's Crystal Ball	Solid R	November 5, 2012
FiveThirtyEight	Solid R	November 6, 2012

=== Results ===
2012 United States presidential election in South Dakota
Party	Candidate	Running mate	Votes	Percentage	Electoral votes
Republican	Mitt Romney	Paul Ryan	210,610	57.89%	3
Democratic	Barack Obama (incumbent)	Joe Biden (incumbent)	145,039	39.87%	0
Libertarian	Gary Johnson	Jim Gray	5,795	1.59%	0
Constitution	Virgil Goode	Jim Clymer	2,371	0.65%	0
Totals			363,815	100.00%	3

==== By county ====
County	Mitt Romney Republican		Barack Obama Democratic		Various candidates Other parties		Margin		Total
County	#	%	#	%	#	%	#	%	Total
Aurora	804	57.43%	556	39.71%	40	2.86%	248	17.71%	1,400
Beadle	4,230	58.24%	2,881	39.67%	152	2.09%	1,349	18.57%	7,263
Bennett	626	52.04%	548	45.55%	29	2.41%	78	6.48%	1,203
Bon Homme	1,830	59.53%	1,167	37.96%	77	2.50%	663	21.57%	3,074
Brookings	6,220	50.16%	5,827	46.99%	353	2.85%	393	3.17%	12,400
Brown	8,321	51.79%	7,250	45.12%	497	3.09%	1,071	6.67%	16,068
Brule	1,499	63.01%	824	34.64%	56	2.35%	675	28.37%	2,379
Buffalo	166	25.90%	472	73.63%	3	0.47%	-306	-47.74%	641
Butte	3,073	73.03%	1,002	23.81%	133	3.16%	2,071	49.22%	4,208
Campbell	616	78.27%	153	19.44%	18	2.29%	463	58.83%	787
Charles Mix	2,230	59.25%	1,483	39.40%	51	1.35%	747	19.85%	3,764
Clark	1,067	58.59%	713	39.15%	41	2.25%	354	19.44%	1,821
Clay	2,147	41.02%	2,955	56.46%	132	2.52%	-808	-15.44%	5,234
Codington	6,696	58.10%	4,588	39.81%	240	2.08%	2,108	18.29%	11,524
Corson	515	42.92%	648	54.00%	37	3.08%	-133	-11.08%	1,200
Custer	3,062	67.74%	1,335	29.54%	123	2.72%	1,727	38.21%	4,520
Davison	4,757	59.68%	3,042	38.16%	172	2.16%	1,715	21.52%	7,971
Day	1,320	45.95%	1,497	52.11%	56	1.95%	-177	-6.16%	2,873
Deuel	1,175	54.12%	941	43.34%	55	2.53%	234	10.78%	2,171
Dewey	663	34.99%	1,207	63.69%	25	1.32%	-544	-28.71%	1,895
Douglas	1,334	78.93%	332	19.64%	24	1.42%	1,002	59.29%	1,690
Edmunds	1,264	65.29%	622	32.13%	50	2.58%	642	33.16%	1,936
Fall River	2,258	64.22%	1,140	32.42%	118	3.36%	1,118	31.80%	3,516
Faulk	765	67.88%	331	29.37%	31	2.75%	434	38.51%	1,127
Grant	2,034	56.41%	1,493	41.40%	79	2.19%	541	15.00%	3,606
Gregory	1,507	70.06%	599	27.85%	45	2.09%	908	42.21%	2,151
Haakon	940	86.08%	138	12.64%	14	1.28%	802	73.44%	1,092
Hamlin	1,803	64.55%	921	32.98%	69	2.47%	882	31.58%	2,793
Hand	1,242	67.21%	575	31.11%	31	1.68%	667	36.09%	1,848
Hanson	1,627	67.34%	760	31.46%	29	1.20%	867	35.89%	2,416
Harding	638	86.33%	82	11.10%	19	2.57%	556	75.24%	739
Hughes	5,219	64.00%	2,786	34.16%	150	1.84%	2,433	29.83%	8,155
Hutchinson	2,451	71.56%	923	26.95%	51	1.49%	1,528	44.61%	3,425
Hyde	531	72.44%	189	25.78%	13	1.77%	342	46.66%	733
Jackson	661	59.76%	426	38.52%	19	1.72%	235	21.25%	1,106
Jerauld	538	53.48%	452	44.93%	16	1.59%	86	8.55%	1,006
Jones	490	80.46%	108	17.73%	11	1.81%	382	62.73%	609
Kingsbury	1,451	55.64%	1,092	41.87%	65	2.49%	359	13.77%	2,608
Lake	3,419	54.40%	2,724	43.34%	142	2.26%	695	11.06%	6,285
Lawrence	7,025	61.85%	3,973	34.98%	361	3.18%	3,052	26.87%	11,359
Lincoln	13,611	62.00%	7,982	36.36%	359	1.64%	5,629	25.64%	21,952
Lyman	933	59.46%	605	38.56%	31	1.98%	328	20.91%	1,569
Marshall	889	44.74%	1,061	53.40%	37	1.86%	-172	-8.66%	1,987
McCook	1,655	63.34%	905	34.63%	53	2.03%	750	28.70%	2,613
McPherson	921	75.80%	272	22.39%	22	1.81%	649	53.42%	1,215
Meade	7,566	69.95%	2,928	27.07%	323	2.99%	4,638	42.88%	10,817
Mellette	381	49.54%	375	48.76%	13	1.69%	6	0.78%	769
Miner	636	55.79%	479	42.02%	25	2.19%	157	13.77%	1,140
Minnehaha	40,342	52.68%	34,674	45.28%	1,567	2.05%	5,668	7.40%	76,583
Moody	1,535	50.61%	1,429	47.12%	69	2.27%	106	3.49%	3,033
Pennington	28,232	63.49%	15,125	34.02%	1,107	2.49%	13,107	29.48%	44,464
Perkins	1,205	75.79%	319	20.06%	66	4.15%	886	55.72%	1,590
Potter	1,029	74.51%	339	24.55%	13	0.94%	690	49.96%	1,381
Roberts	1,883	44.24%	2,302	54.09%	71	1.67%	-419	-9.84%	4,256
Sanborn	688	61.70%	389	34.89%	38	3.41%	299	26.82%	1,115
Shannon	188	5.98%	2,937	93.39%	20	0.64%	-2,749	-87.41%	3,145
Spink	1,670	54.92%	1,300	42.75%	71	2.33%	370	12.17%	3,041
Stanley	1,063	69.03%	435	28.25%	42	2.73%	628	40.78%	1,540
Sully	613	74.94%	186	22.74%	19	2.32%	427	52.20%	818
Todd	498	19.94%	1,976	79.13%	23	0.92%	-1,478	-59.19%	2,497
Tripp	1,905	70.79%	737	27.39%	49	1.82%	1,168	43.40%	2,691
Turner	2,715	64.49%	1,411	33.52%	84	2.00%	1,304	30.97%	4,210
Union	4,698	61.85%	2,782	36.62%	116	1.53%	1,916	25.22%	7,596
Walworth	1,731	70.31%	671	27.25%	60	2.44%	1,060	43.05%	2,462
Yankton	5,495	55.09%	4,226	42.37%	253	2.54%	1,269	12.72%	9,974
Ziebach	314	41.26%	439	57.69%	8	1.05%	-125	-16.43%	761
Totals	210,610	57.89%	145,039	39.87%	8,166	2.24%	65,571	18.02%	363,815

Counties that flipped from Democratic to Republican

- Brookings (largest city: Brookings)
- Brown (largest city: Aberdeen)
- Lake (largest city: Madison)
- Miner (largest city: Howard)
- Minnehaha (largest city: Sioux Falls)
- Moody (largest city: Flandreau)

==== By congressional district ====
South Dakota has only one congressional district because of its small population compared to other states. This district, called the at-large district because it covers the entire state, is equivalent to the statewide election results.

District	Romney	Obama	Representative
At-large	57.89%	39.87%	Kristi Noem

== See also ==
- United States presidential elections in South Dakota
- 2012 Republican Party presidential debates and forums
- 2012 Republican Party presidential primaries
- Results of the 2012 Republican Party presidential primaries
- South Dakota Republican Party
