= Shannon Colony, South Dakota =

- Census-designated place
- Location within South Dakota Location within the United States
- Coordinates: 43°58′57″N 97°25′30″W
- Country: United States
- State: South Dakota
- County: Miner

Area
  - Total: 0.25 sq mi (0.65 km^{2})
  - Land: 0.25 sq mi (0.65 km^{2})
  - Water: 0 sq mi (0.00 km^{2})
- Elevation: 1,631 ft (497 m)

Population (2020)
  - Total: 1
  - Density: 4.0/sq mi (1.53/km^{2})
- Time zone: UTC-6 (Central (CST))
  - Summer (DST): UTC-5 (CDT)
- ZIP Code: 57076 (Winfred)
- Area code: 605
- FIPS code: 46-58332
- GNIS feature ID: 2813052

Shannon Colony is a census-designated place (CDP) and Hutterite colony in Miner County, South Dakota, United States. It was first listed as a CDP prior to the 2020 census. The population of the CDP was 1 at the 2020 census.

It is in the eastern part of the county, 7 miles (11 km) by road southeast of Howard, the county seat, and 4 miles (6 km) southwest of Winfred.

== Demographics ==
Historical population
Census	Pop.	Note	%±
2020	1		—
U.S. Decennial Census
