= Brant Lake, South Dakota =

- City
- Location within South Dakota Location within the United States
- Coordinates: 43°55′51″N 96°56′37″W
- Country: United States
- State: South Dakota
- County: Lake

Area
  - Total: 0.15 sq mi (0.40 km^{2})
  - Land: 0.15 sq mi (0.40 km^{2})
  - Water: 0 sq mi (0.00 km^{2})
- Elevation: 1,604 ft (489 m)

Population (2020)
  - Total: 56
  - Density: 361.8/sq mi (139.71/km^{2})
- Time zone: UTC-6 (Central (CST))
  - Summer (DST): UTC-5 (CDT)
- Area code: 605
- GNIS feature ID: 2785126

Brant Lake is a city in Lake County, South Dakota, United States. Its population was 56 as of the 2020 census. It was counted as a census-designated place prior to the 2020 census, as it had not yet incorporated. The town's residents voted to incorporate in a 61–9 vote on March 29, 2016.

== Demographics ==
Historical population
Census	Pop.	Note	%±
2020	56		—
U.S. Decennial Census

=== 2020 census ===
As of the 2020 census, Brant Lake had a population of 56 and a median age of 61.3 years; 8.9% of residents were under the age of 18 and 35.7% were 65 years of age or older. For every 100 females there were 124.0 males, and for every 100 females age 18 and over there were 121.7 males age 18 and over.

0.0% of residents lived in urban areas, while 100.0% lived in rural areas.

There were 23 households in Brant Lake, of which 34.8% had children under the age of 18 living in them. Of all households, 87.0% were married-couple households, 13.0% were households with a male householder and no spouse or partner present, and 0.0% were households with a female householder and no spouse or partner present. About 4.3% of all households were made up of individuals and 0.0% had someone living alone who was 65 years of age or older.

There were 40 housing units, of which 42.5% were vacant. The homeowner vacancy rate was 0.0% and the rental vacancy rate was 0.0%.

Racial composition as of the 2020 census
Race	Number	Percent
White	53	94.6%
Black or African American	0	0.0%
American Indian and Alaska Native	0	0.0%
Asian	0	0.0%
Native Hawaiian and Other Pacific Islander	0	0.0%
Some other race	2	3.6%
Two or more races	1	1.8%
Hispanic or Latino (of any race)	1	1.8%

== Education ==
It is in the Chester Area School District 39-1.
