= Milwaukee Lake =

Lake in the state of South Dakota, United States

- Location within South Dakota Location within the United States
- Location: Lake County, South Dakota
- Coordinates: 44°01′06″N 96°57′47″W
- Type: lake
- Etymology: Milwaukee, Wisconsin
- Basin countries: United States
- Surface elevation: 1,647 ft (502 m)

Milwaukee Lake is a natural lake in South Dakota, in the United States that is also near the town of Wentworth.

Milwaukee Lake was named after Milwaukee, Wisconsin, the native home of a large share of the first settlers.

== See also ==
- List of lakes in South Dakota
