= Madison station (South Dakota) =

Railway station in Madison, South Dakota, United States

Madison
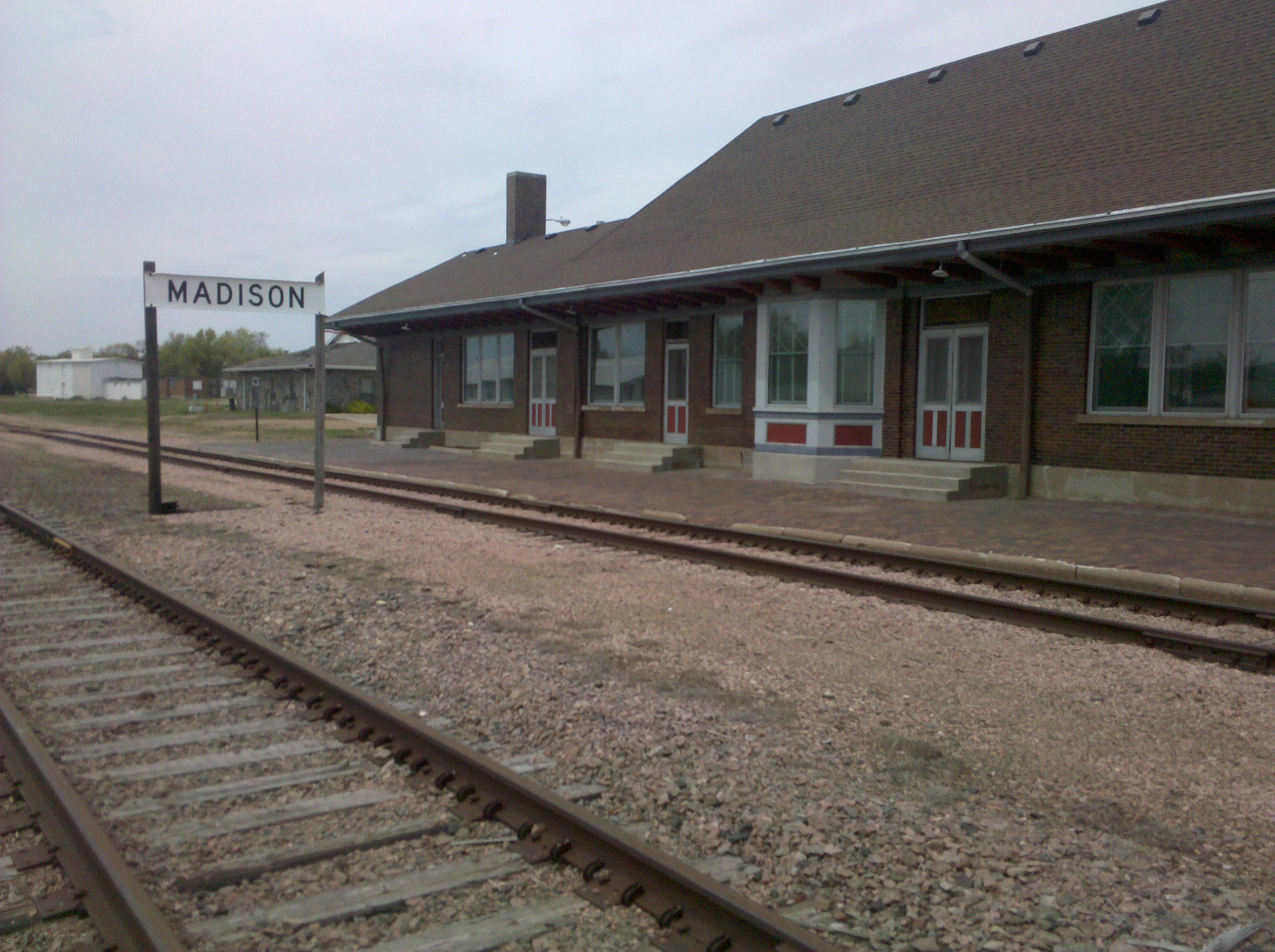
- Looking northwest towards a sign between the tracks in front of the former Madison Milwaukee Road station.

General information
- Location: 315 South Egan Avenue, Madison, South Dakota 57042
- System: Former Milwaukee Road passenger rail station

History
- Opened: 1881
- Closed: 1953
- Rebuilt: 1906

Services
Preceding station	Milwaukee Road	Following station
Junius toward Wessington Springs	Wessington Springs – La Crosse	Wentworth toward La Crosse
- Chicago, Milwaukee, St. Paul and Pacific Railroad Depot
- U.S. National Register of Historic Places
- Location within South Dakota
- Location: 315 S. Egan Ave; Madison, South Dakota
- Coordinates: 44°00′09″N 97°06′53″W
- Built: 1906
- NRHP reference No.: 89001719
- Added to NRHP: September 19, 1989
Location

The Chicago, Milwaukee, St. Paul and Pacific Railroad Depot was built by the Chicago, Milwaukee, St. Paul and Pacific Railroad (also known as The Milwaukee Road) in 1906. It is located at the south end of the business district in Madison, South Dakota. The building is a rectangular single-story brick structure. It housed men's and women's waiting rooms, a lunch room ("beanery"), station agent's office, and a freight room. Rather than being a wood-frame building, as was usual for smaller, rural stations, the depot at Madison was built of brick.

The Milwaukee Road first entered Madison in the 1881. In 1906 it built the new depot. It functioned as a passenger station until 1953. The building was still used by the railroad as offices and a freight agency. In 1979, before The Milwaukee Road went bankrupt, the depot was closed. After the bankruptcy, the BNSF Railway bought the property and the rail line. It continued to use the depot for freight and storage until 1981. BNSF then closed the depot for good. In 1989, the depot was bought by local citizens who then turned it over to the local Chamber of Commerce for use as its new office.

The depot was listed in the National Register of Historic Places because of its architecture and also because of its association with the development of Madison.
