= J. Whitney Goff Round Barn =

- U.S. National Register of Historic Places
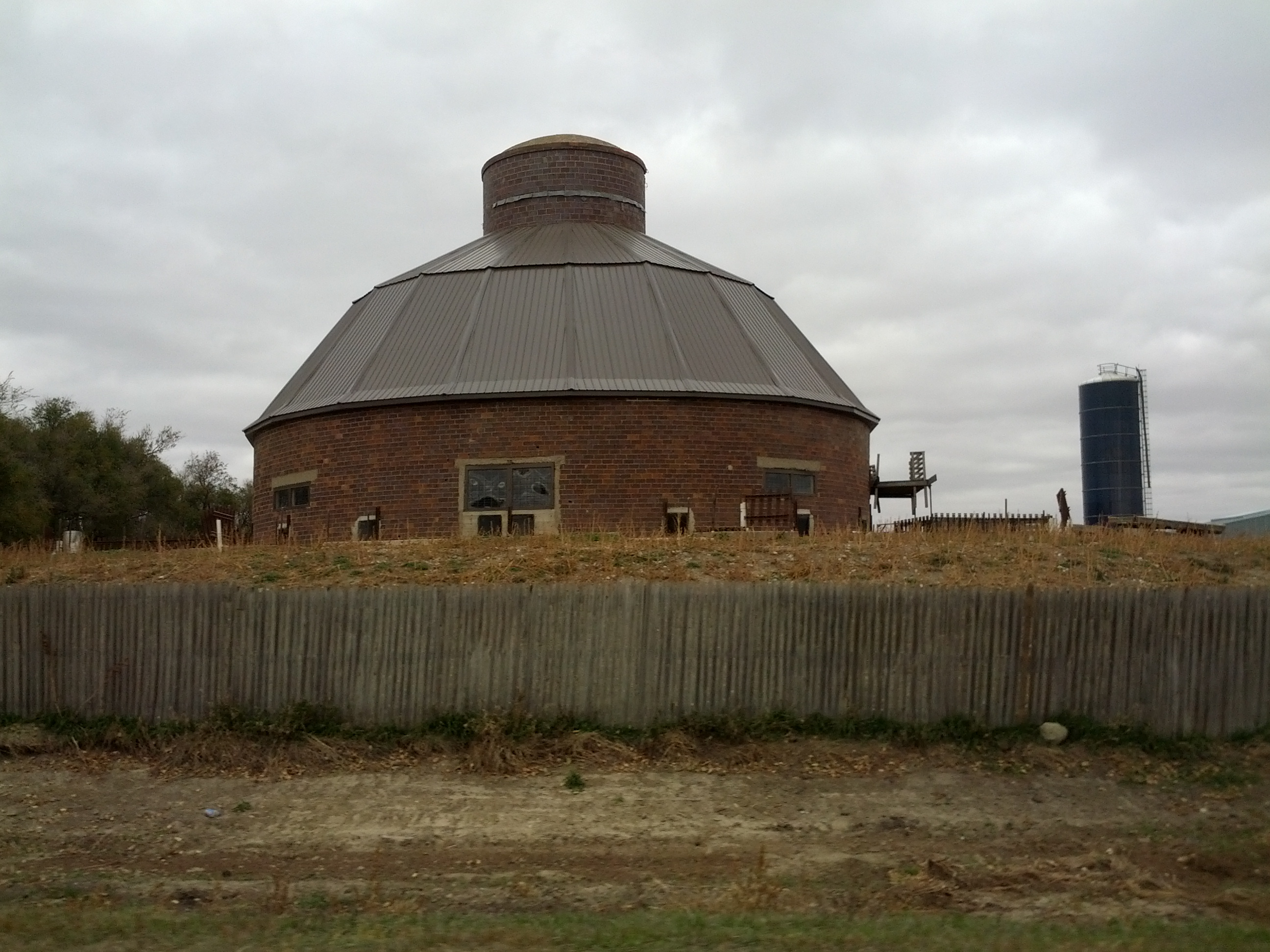
- The J. Whitney Goff Round Barn in October 2012

- Location within South Dakota Location within the United States
- Nearest city: Winfred, South Dakota
- Coordinates: 43°57′51.552″N 97°18′21.1824″W
- Area: less than one acre
- Built: 1915
- Built by: Johnston Brothers Patent
- Architectural style: Round barn
- MPS: South Dakota's Round and Polygonal Barns and Pavilions MPS
- NRHP reference No.: 04000469
- Added to NRHP: May 19, 2004

The J. Whitney Goff Round Barn near Winfred, South Dakota, United States, is a round barn that was built in 1915. It was listed on the National Register of Historic Places in 2004.

Round barns in the state were later studied, and a number more were recommended for NRHP listing.
