= Gilman Lake =

Lake in the state of South Dakota, United States

- Location within South Dakota
- Location: Lake County, South Dakota
- Coordinates: 44°06′00″N 97°20′46″W
- Type: lake
- Basin countries: United States
- Surface elevation: 1,722 ft (525 m)

Gilman Lake is a natural lake in South Dakota, in the United States.

Gilman Lake has the name of Gilman W. Smith, a railroad engineer.
