= Ramona, South Dakota =

- Town
- Location in Lake County and the state of South Dakota
- Coordinates: 44°07′12″N 97°12′55″W
- Country: United States
- State: South Dakota
- County: Lake
- Platted: 1886

Area
  - Total: 0.27 sq mi (0.71 km^{2})
  - Land: 0.27 sq mi (0.71 km^{2})
  - Water: 0 sq mi (0.00 km^{2})
- Elevation: 1,811 ft (552 m)

Population (2020)
  - Total: 159
  - Density: 579.6/sq mi (223.79/km^{2})
- Time zone: UTC-6 (Central (CST))
  - Summer (DST): UTC-5 (CDT)
- ZIP code: 57054
- Area code: 605
- FIPS code: 46-52860
- GNIS feature ID: 1267542
- Website: ramonasd.org

Ramona is a town in Lake County, South Dakota, United States. The population was 159 at the 2020 census.

Ramona was laid out in 1886, and named for the local Ramon family.

== Geography ==
According to the United States Census Bureau, the town has a total area of 0.27 square miles (0.70 km^{2}), all land.

== Demographics ==
Historical population
Census	Pop.	Note	%±
1900	172		—
1910	312		81.4%
1920	356		14.1%
1930	279		−21.6%
1940	265		−5.0%
1950	278		4.9%
1960	247		−11.2%
1970	227		−8.1%
1980	241		6.2%
1990	194		−19.5%
2000	190		−2.1%
2010	174		−8.4%
2020	159		−8.6%
U.S. Decennial Census

=== 2010 census ===
As of the census of 2010, there were 174 people, 81 households, and 48 families residing in the town. The population density was 644.4 inhabitants per square mile (248.8/km^{2}). There were 112 housing units at an average density of 414.8 per square mile (160.2/km^{2}). The racial makeup of the town was 94.3% White, 1.7% Native American, 1.1% Asian, 1.1% from other races, and 1.7% from two or more races. Hispanic or Latino of any race were 3.4% of the population.

There were 81 households, of which 24.7% had children under the age of 18 living with them, 48.1% were married couples living together, 8.6% had a female householder with no husband present, 2.5% had a male householder with no wife present, and 40.7% were non-families. 38.3% of all households were made up of individuals, and 29.6% had someone living alone who was 65 years of age or older. The average household size was 2.15 and the average family size was 2.88.

The median age in the town was 47 years. 24.1% of residents were under the age of 18; 4% were between the ages of 18 and 24; 18.9% were from 25 to 44; 25.9% were from 45 to 64; and 27% were 65 years of age or older. The gender makeup of the town was 48.3% male and 51.7% female.

=== 2000 census ===
As of the census of 2000, there were 190 people, 88 households, and 52 families residing in the town. The population density was 705.8 inhabitants per square mile (272.5/km^{2}). There were 99 housing units at an average density of 367.8 per square mile (142.0/km^{2}). The racial makeup of the town was 98.95% White and 1.05% Asian.

There were 88 households, out of which 18.2% had children under the age of 18 living with them, 52.3% were married couples living together, 5.7% had a female householder with no husband present, and 40.9% were non-families. 40.9% of all households were made up of individuals, and 25.0% had someone living alone who was 65 years of age or older. The average household size was 2.00 and the average family size was 2.67.

In the town, the population was spread out, with 14.2% under the age of 18, 7.4% from 18 to 24, 18.9% from 25 to 44, 25.8% from 45 to 64, and 33.7% who were 65 years of age or older. The median age was 52 years. For every 100 females, there were 90.0 males. For every 100 females age 18 and over, there were 83.1 males.

The median income for a household in the town was $24,583, and the median income for a family was $40,938. Males had a median income of $33,125 versus $16,250 for females. The per capita income for the town was $13,598. About 4.9% of families and 4.9% of the population were below the poverty line, including none of those under the age of eighteen and 15.2% of those 65 or over.

== Education ==
It is in the Oldham-Ramona-Rutland School District 39-6.

The Oldham and Ramona school districts combined in 1990, becoming the Oldham-Ramona School District 39-5. That district consolidated into ORR in 2023.
