= Lake Madison =

Lake in the state of South Dakota, United States

- Location within South Dakota Location within the United States
- Location: Lake County, South Dakota
- Coordinates: 43°57′35″N 97°01′51″W
- Type: Lake
- Basin countries: United States
- Surface elevation: 1,604 ft (489 m)

Lake Madison is a natural lake in South Dakota, in the United States.

Lake Madison was named after Madison, Wisconsin, as was the nearby city of Madison, South Dakota.

== See also ==
- List of lakes in South Dakota
