= Nunda, South Dakota =

- Town
- Location in Lake County and the state of South Dakota
- Coordinates: 44°09′35″N 97°01′10″W
- Country: United States
- State: South Dakota
- County: Lake

Area
  - Total: 1.01 sq mi (2.61 km^{2})
  - Land: 1.01 sq mi (2.61 km^{2})
  - Water: 0 sq mi (0.00 km^{2})
- Elevation: 1,749 ft (533 m)

Population (2020)
  - Total: 46
  - Density: 45.6/sq mi (17.62/km^{2})
- Time zone: UTC-6 (Central (CST))
  - Summer (DST): UTC-5 (CDT)
- ZIP code: 57050
- Area code: 605
- FIPS code: 46-46060
- GNIS feature ID: 1267518

Nunda is a town in northeastern Lake County, South Dakota, United States. The population was 46 at the 2020 census.

== History ==
The first settlement at Nunda was made in 1877 by a colony of Scandinavians.

== Geography ==
According to the United States Census Bureau, the town has a total area of 1.01 square miles (2.62 km^{2}), all land.

== Demographics ==
Historical population
Census	Pop.	Note	%±
1910	137		—
1920	206		50.4%
1930	163		−20.9%
1940	147		−9.8%
1950	102		−30.6%
1960	106		3.9%
1970	85		−19.8%
1980	60		−29.4%
1990	45		−25.0%
2000	47		4.4%
2010	43		−8.5%
2020	46		7.0%
U.S. Decennial Census

=== 2010 census ===
As of the census of 2010, there were 43 people, 21 households, and 15 families residing in the town. The population density was 42.6 inhabitants per square mile (16.4/km^{2}). There were 24 housing units at an average density of 23.8 per square mile (9.2/km^{2}). The racial makeup of the town was 100.0% White.

There were 21 households, of which 19.0% had children under the age of 18 living with them, 61.9% were married couples living together, 4.8% had a female householder with no husband present, 4.8% had a male householder with no wife present, and 28.6% were non-families. 28.6% of all households were made up of individuals, and 9.5% had someone living alone who was 65 years of age or older. The average household size was 2.05 and the average family size was 2.47.

The median age in the town was 52.8 years. 20.9% of residents were under the age of 18; 0.1% were between the ages of 18 and 24; 16.3% were from 25 to 44; 35% were from 45 to 64; and 27.9% were 65 years of age or older. The gender makeup of the town was 51.2% male and 48.8% female.

=== 2000 census ===
As of the census of 2000, there were 47 people, 25 households, and 13 families residing in the town. The population density was 46.9 inhabitants per square mile (18.1/km^{2}). There were 27 housing units at an average density of 26.9 per square mile (10.4/km^{2}). The racial makeup of the town was 100.00% White.

There were 25 households, out of which 20.0% had children under the age of 18 living with them, 44.0% were married couples living together, 4.0% had a female householder with no husband present, and 48.0% were non-families. 44.0% of all households were made up of individuals, and 12.0% had someone living alone who was 65 years of age or older. The average household size was 1.88 and the average family size was 2.62.

In the town, the population was spread out, with 19.1% under the age of 18, 2.1% from 18 to 24, 29.8% from 25 to 44, 36.2% from 45 to 64, and 12.8% who were 65 years of age or older. The median age was 44 years. For every 100 females, there were 147.4 males. For every 100 females age 18 and over, there were 171.4 males.

The median income for a household in the town was $23,750, and the median income for a family was $26,875. Males had a median income of $26,250 versus $16,667 for females. The per capita income for the town was $14,154. There were no families and 9.6% of the population living below the poverty line, including no under eighteens and 21.4% of those over 64.

== Education ==
It is in the Rutland School District 39-4.
