= Madison Masonic Temple (Madison, South Dakota) =

- U.S. National Register of Historic Places
- Location within South Dakota Location within the United States
- Location: 229 N. Egan Ave., Madison, South Dakota
- Coordinates: 44°0′25″N 97°6′48″W
- Area: less than one acre
- Built: 1906
- Architect: Joseph Schwarz, Sr.
- Architectural style: Classical Revival
- NRHP reference No.: 89002335
- Added to NRHP: January 26, 1990

The Madison Masonic Temple in Madison, South Dakota is a building from 1906. It was listed on the National Register of Historic Places in 1990. It was demolished in 2015 due to falling into disrepair.

It has also been known as Evergreen Lodge No. 17 A.F. & A.M.. It is a two-story masonry Classical Revival-style building on a raised basement, with a portico incorporating Ionic columns. Doors and windows are topped by flat brick arches with terra cotta keystones. Terra cotta is also used in cornices and in plaques beside the building's portico. It has a shallow roof being a parapet.

Which of several Masonic groups were meeting was originally indicated by colored lamps upon a metal pole rising from the center of the parapet.
