= Aurora County, South Dakota =

County in South Dakota, United States

- County
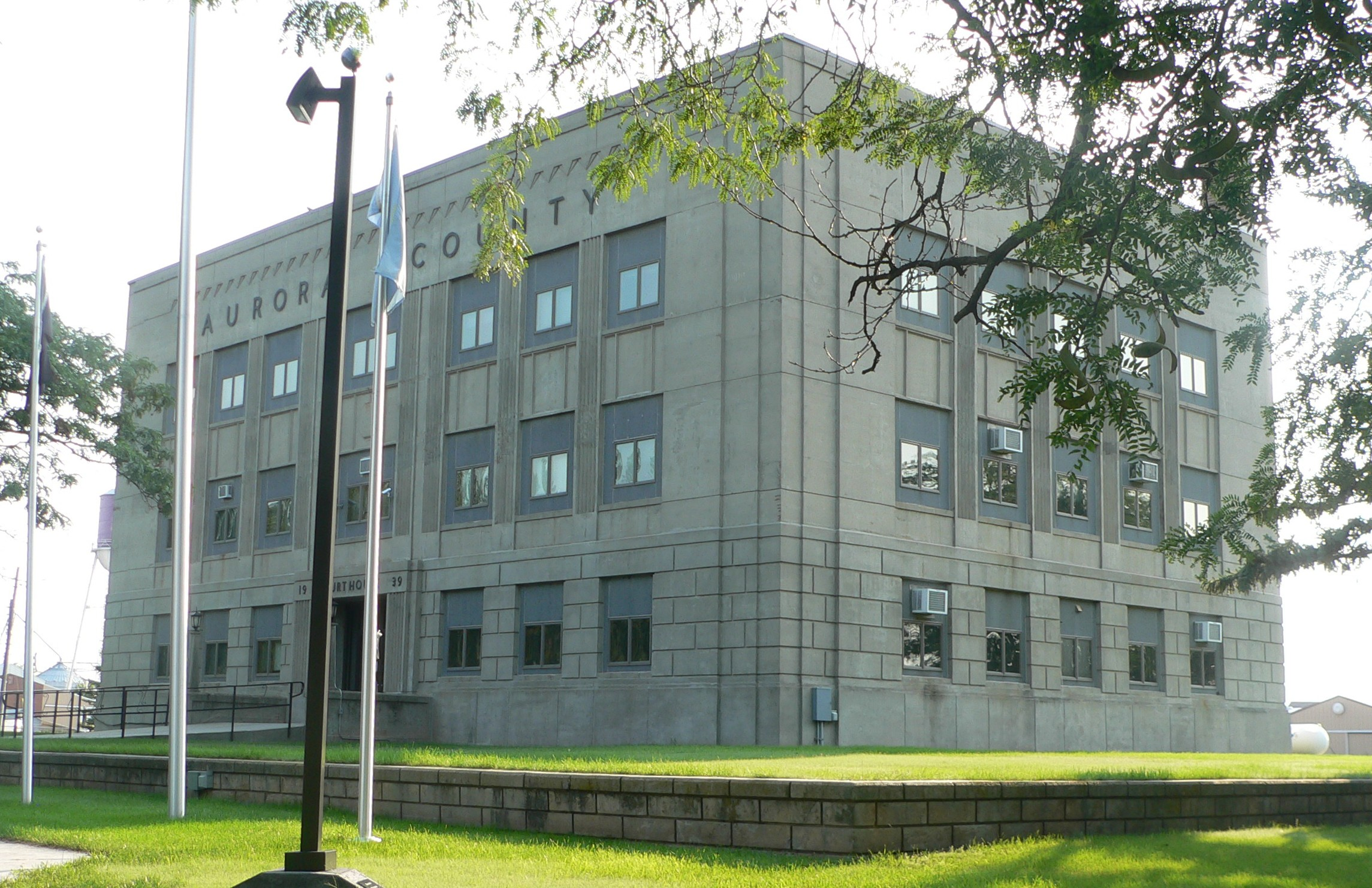
- Aurora County Courthouse in Plankinton

- Location within the U.S. state of South Dakota
- Coordinates: 43°43′N 98°34′W
- Country: United States
- State: South Dakota
- Created: 1879
- Organized: 1881
- Named for: Aurora, a Roman goddess
- Seat: Plankinton
- Largest city: Plankinton

Area
  - Total: 713 sq mi (1,850 km^{2})
  - Land: 708 sq mi (1,830 km^{2})
  - Water: 4.3 sq mi (11 km^{2}) 0.6%

Population (2020)
  - Total: 2,747
  - Estimate (2025): 2,801 ▲
  - Density: 3.88/sq mi (1.50/km^{2})
- Time zone: UTC−6 (Central)
  - Summer (DST): UTC−5 (CDT)
- Congressional district: At-large

Aurora County is a county in the U.S. state of South Dakota. As of the 2020 census, the population was 2,747. The county was created in 1879, and was organized in 1881.

== History ==
Aurora County, named for Aurora, the Roman goddess of the dawn, was created by the Dakota Territory on October 1, 1879. It was organized on August 29, 1881, when three county commissioners were appointed. The county had been established from the combination of former counties Cragin and Wetmore, which had both been formed in 1873. The three county commissioners met on August 29, 1881, and named Plankinton the county seat, an act which was ratified by voters in November 1882. The northern portion of Aurora County was partitioned off on April 17, 1883, and established as Jerauld County.

== Geography ==
The terrain of Aurora County consists of low rolling hills, partially devoted to agriculture. It is dotted with small lakes and ponds. The highest point is the upper west boundary line, and the terrain slopes east-northeastward; the lowest point is the county's northeast corner at 1,325 ft (404 m) ASL.

The county has a total area of 713 square miles (1,850 km^{2}), of which 708 square miles (1,830 km^{2}) is land and 4.3 square miles (11 km^{2}) (0.6%) is water.

=== Major highways ===
- Interstate 90
- U.S. Highway 281
- South Dakota Highway 42

=== Adjacent counties ===
- Jerauld County – north
- Sanborn County – northeast
- Davison County – east
- Douglas County – south
- Charles Mix County – southwest
- Brule County – west

=== Protected areas ===
- Crystal Lake Public Shooting Area
- Hanson Lake State Public Shooting Area
- Kimball State Public Shooting Area
- Koch Waterfowl Production Area
- Kramer Slaugh Public Shooting Area
- Krell Waterfowl Production Area
- Lutz Waterfowl Production Area
- Maine Waterfowl Production Area
- National Waterfowl Production Area
- Pleasant Lake State Public Shooting Area
- Schute Waterfowl Production Area
- Sorenson Waterfowl Production Area
- Wilmarth Lake Game Production Area

== Demographics ==
Historical population
Census	Pop.	Note	%±
1880	69		—
1890	5,045		7,211.6%
1900	4,011		−20.5%
1910	6,143		53.2%
1920	7,246		18.0%
1930	7,139		−1.5%
1940	5,387		−24.5%
1950	5,020		−6.8%
1960	4,749		−5.4%
1970	4,183		−11.9%
1980	3,628		−13.3%
1990	3,136		−13.6%
2000	3,058		−2.5%
2010	2,710		−11.4%
2020	2,747		1.4%
2025 (est.)	2,801	▲	2.0%
U.S. Decennial Census; 1790–1960 1900–1990; 1990–2000 2010–2020

=== 2020 census ===
As of the 2020 census, there were 2,747 people, 1,096 households, and 746 families residing in the county. The population density was 3.9 inhabitants per square mile (1.5/km^{2}). Of the residents, 25.8% were under the age of 18 and 22.3% were 65 years of age or older; the median age was 42.2 years. For every 100 females there were 104.5 males, and for every 100 females age 18 and over there were 106.2 males.

The racial makeup of the county was 88.9% White, 0.5% Black or African American, 1.4% American Indian and Alaska Native, 0.5% Asian, 5.1% from some other race, and 3.5% from two or more races. Hispanic or Latino residents of any race comprised 8.0% of the population.

There were 1,096 households in the county, of which 29.0% had children under the age of 18 living with them and 17.7% had a female householder with no spouse or partner present. About 27.1% of all households were made up of individuals and 13.3% had someone living alone who was 65 years of age or older.

There were 1,260 housing units, of which 13.0% were vacant. Among occupied housing units, 77.5% were owner-occupied and 22.5% were renter-occupied. The homeowner vacancy rate was 0.5% and the rental vacancy rate was 8.9%.

=== 2010 census ===
As of the 2010 census, there were 2,710 people, 1,102 households, and 736 families residing in the county. The population density was 3.8 inhabitants per square mile (1.5/km^{2}). There were 1,324 housing units at an average density of 1.9 per square mile (0.73/km^{2}). The racial makeup of the county was 95.1% white, 1.5% American Indian, 0.7% Asian, 0.4% black or African American, 1.8% from other races, and 0.5% from two or more races. Those of Hispanic or Latino origin made up 3.7% of the population. In terms of ancestry, 54.3% were German, 13.7% were Dutch, 11.8% were Norwegian, 8.7% were Irish, 7.2% were English, and 4.9% were American.

Of the 1,102 households, 28.3% had children under the age of 18 living with them, 57.5% were married couples living together, 5.4% had a female householder with no husband present, 33.2% were non-families, and 29.9% of all households were made up of individuals. The average household size was 2.37 and the average family size was 2.96. The median age was 43.2 years.

The median income for a household in the county was $45,230 and the median income for a family was $55,588. Males had a median income of $30,185 versus $27,206 for females. The per capita income for the county was $21,291. About 4.5% of families and 8.2% of the population were below the poverty line, including 7.4% of those under age 18 and 12.8% of those age 65 or over.

== Communities ==
=== Cities ===
- Plankinton (county seat)
- White Lake

=== Town ===
- Stickney

=== Census-designated places ===
- Aurora Center
- Storla

=== Townships ===
- Aurora Township
- Belford Township
- Bristol Township
- Center Township
- Cooper Township
- Crystal Lake Township
- Dudley Township
- Eureka Township
- Firesteel Township
- Gales Township
- Hopper Township
- Lake Township
- Palatine Township
- Patten Township
- Plankinton Township
- Pleasant Lake Township
- Pleasant Valley Township
- Truro Township
- Washington Township
- White Lake Township

== Politics ==
Aurora County at one time favored the Democratic Party and was one of just 130 counties nationwide to be won by South Dakota favorite son George McGovern, who grew up in adjacent Davison County. However, with the “Reagan Revolution” of the 1980s it has gradually turned into a strongly Republican county. The last Democrat to win a majority in Aurora County was Michael Dukakis in the 1988 election.

United States presidential election results for Aurora County, South Dakota
Year	Republican		Democratic		Third party(ies)	
Year	No.	%	No.	%	No.	%
1892	461	46.95%	207	21.08%	314	31.98%
1896	387	44.08%	479	54.56%	12	1.37%
1900	503	49.75%	486	48.07%	22	2.18%
1904	652	58.79%	407	36.70%	50	4.51%
1908	686	47.91%	694	48.46%	52	3.63%
1912	0	0.00%	801	51.21%	763	48.79%
1916	735	46.05%	793	49.69%	68	4.26%
1920	1,004	49.19%	445	21.80%	592	29.01%
1924	967	36.31%	665	24.97%	1,031	38.72%
1928	1,552	51.72%	1,426	47.52%	23	0.77%
1932	860	26.72%	2,304	71.58%	55	1.71%
1936	1,082	36.52%	1,801	60.78%	80	2.70%
1940	1,408	50.41%	1,385	49.59%	0	0.00%
1944	1,163	53.50%	1,011	46.50%	0	0.00%
1948	1,056	44.99%	1,275	54.32%	16	0.68%
1952	1,458	59.39%	997	40.61%	0	0.00%
1956	1,055	43.43%	1,374	56.57%	0	0.00%
1960	1,267	49.94%	1,270	50.06%	0	0.00%
1964	871	35.90%	1,555	64.10%	0	0.00%
1968	1,043	46.71%	1,060	47.47%	130	5.82%
1972	1,075	45.96%	1,257	53.74%	7	0.30%
1976	831	39.40%	1,269	60.17%	9	0.43%
1980	1,251	58.93%	709	33.40%	163	7.68%
1984	1,029	54.65%	840	44.61%	14	0.74%
1988	856	46.17%	987	53.24%	11	0.59%
1992	594	34.70%	680	39.72%	438	25.58%
1996	709	44.68%	664	41.84%	214	13.48%
2000	847	59.94%	513	36.31%	53	3.75%
2004	1,009	61.19%	620	37.60%	20	1.21%
2008	794	53.11%	655	43.81%	46	3.08%
2012	804	57.43%	556	39.71%	40	2.86%
2016	974	69.23%	340	24.16%	93	6.61%
2020	1,052	74.88%	317	22.56%	36	2.56%
2024	1,056	75.81%	302	21.68%	35	2.51%

== See also ==
- National Register of Historic Places listings in Aurora County, South Dakota
