= Chester, South Dakota =

- Census-designated place
- Location in South Dakota Location in the United States
- Coordinates: 43°53′59″N 96°55′40″W
- Country: United States
- State: South Dakota
- County: Lake

Area
  - Total: 0.81 sq mi (2.11 km^{2})
  - Land: 0.81 sq mi (2.11 km^{2})
  - Water: 0 sq mi (0.00 km^{2})
- Elevation: 1,595 ft (486 m)

Population (2020)
  - Total: 257
  - Density: 315/sq mi (121.6/km^{2})
- Time zone: UTC-6 (Central (CST))
  - Summer (DST): UTC-5 (CDT)
- ZIP code: 57016
- FIPS code: 46-11660
- GNIS feature ID: 2584549

Chester is an unincorporated community and census-designated place (CDP) in Lake County, South Dakota, United States. The population was 257 as of the 2020 census. Chester has been assigned the ZIP code of 57016.

== History ==
Chester was laid out in 1905, and named after Chester Township.

== Geography ==
Chester is in the southeast corner of Lake County, 1 mile (1.6 km) south of Brant Lake and 15 miles (24 km) southeast of Madison, the county seat. According to the U.S. Census Bureau, the Chester CDP has an area of 0.8 square miles (2.1 km^{2}), all land. Skunk Creek, the outlet of Brant Lake, forms the western edge of the community and flows south to the Big Sioux River at Sioux Falls.

Near Chester is Buffalo Slough, a National Natural Landmark.

== Demographics ==
Historical population
Census	Pop.	Note	%±
2020	257		—
U.S. Decennial Census

== Education ==
It is in the Chester Area School District 39-1.
