= Winfred, South Dakota =

- Census-designated place
- Location within South Dakota Location within the United States
- Coordinates: 43°59′48″N 97°21′35″W
- Country: United States
- State: South Dakota
- County: Lake
- Founded: 1882

Area
  - Total: 1.04 sq mi (2.69 km^{2})
  - Land: 1.00 sq mi (2.59 km^{2})
  - Water: 0.039 sq mi (0.10 km^{2})
- Elevation: 1,696 ft (517 m)

Population (2020)
  - Total: 38
  - Density: 38.0/sq mi (14.66/km^{2})
- Time zone: UTC-6 (Central (CST))
  - Summer (DST): UTC-5 (CDT)
- ZIP code: 57076
- Area code: 605
- FIPS code: 46-72100
- GNIS feature ID: 2628854

Winfred is an unincorporated community and census-designated place (CDP) in Lake County, South Dakota, United States, approximately 12 miles (19 km) west of Madison. The population was 38 as of the 2020 census.

== History ==
Winfred was laid out in 1882. The town was unincorporated in 1995.

== Geography ==
Winfred is in western Lake County, in the northwest part of Winfred Township. Its western boundary is the border with Miner County. U.S. Route 81 and South Dakota Highway 34, running concurrently, form the northern border of the community. The two highways lead east to Madison, the county seat, while to the west they divide a short distance into Miner County. US-81 leads south 24 miles (39 km) to Interstate 90 south of Salem, while SD-34 leads west 8 miles (13 km) to Howard.

According to the U.S. Census Bureau, the Winfred CDP has an area of 1.0 square mile (2.7 km^{2}), of which 0.04 square miles (0.1 km^{2}), or 3.68%, are water. Lake Winfred is a natural water body northeast of the center of town.

== Demographics ==
Historical population
| Census | Pop. | Note | %± |
|---|---|---|---|
| 2020 | 38 | | — |
U.S. Decennial Census

== Education ==
It is in the Madison Central School District 39-2.
