= Madison Central School District 39-2 =

School district in South Dakota, United States

Madison Central School District

Address
- 800 NE 9th St. Madison, Lake County, South Dakota, 57042; United States

District information
- Grades: K - 12
- Superintendent: Joel Jorgenson
- NCES District ID: 4639600

Students and staff
- Enrollment: 1,169
- Student–teacher ratio: 14.46

Other information
- Telephone: (605) 256–7700
- Website: www.madison.k12.sd.us

The Madison Central School District 39–2 is a public school district in Lake County, South Dakota, based in Madison, South Dakota.

The majority of the district is located in Lake County and a portion of the district extends into McCook County.

== Schools ==
The Madison Central School District contains one elementary school, one middle school, and one high school.

Schools:

- Madison Elementary
- Madison Middle School
- Madison High School

== Demographics ==
=== Enrollment by gender ===
Category	Percentage
Male	50%
Female	50%

=== Enrollment by diversity ===
Category	Percentage
White	82.2%
Hispanic/Latino	10.1%
Two or more races	4.2%
American Indian or Alaska Native	1.9%
Black or African American	1.1%
Asian or Asian Pacific Islander	0.6%
