= Lake County, South Dakota =

County in South Dakota, United States

- County
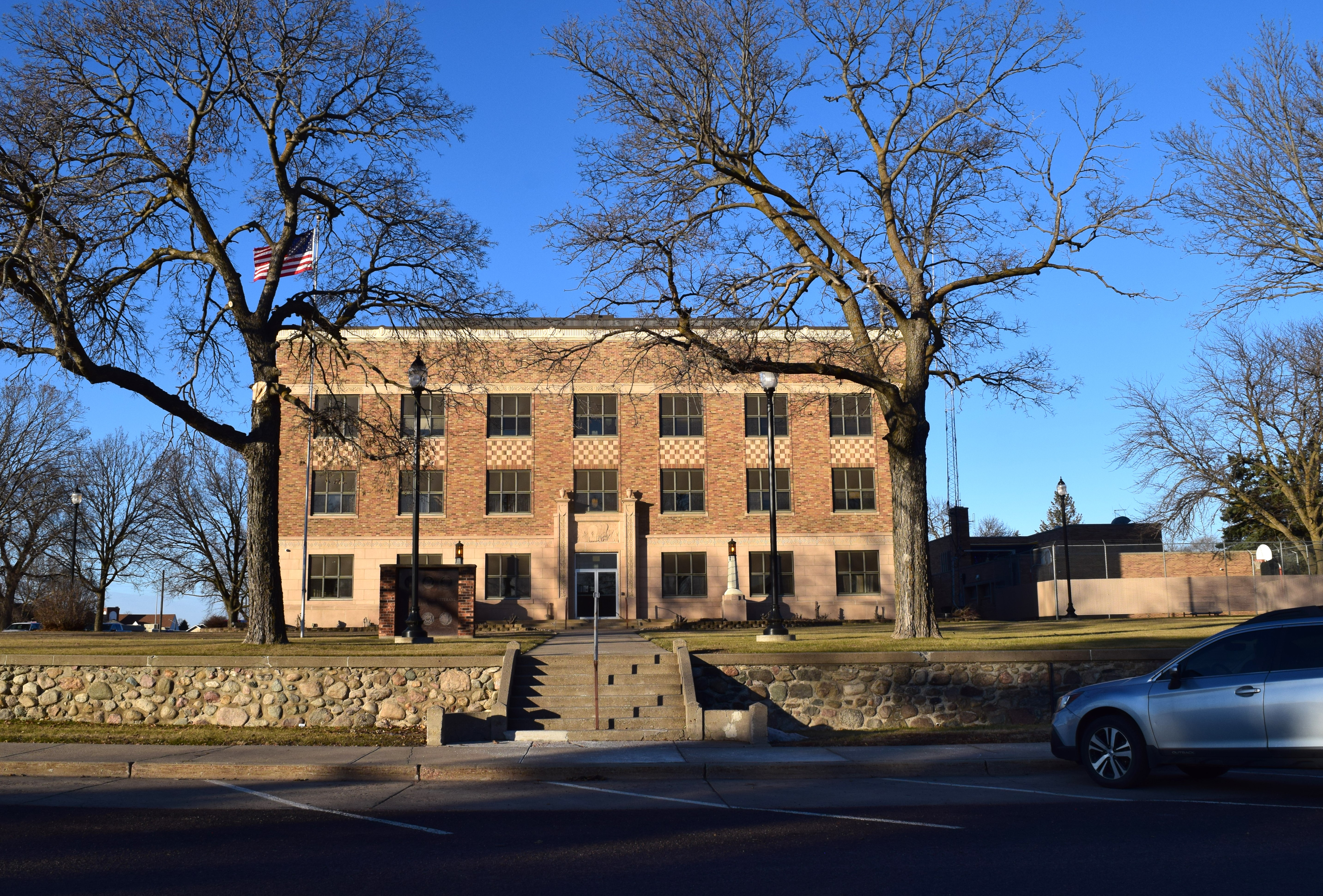
- Lake County Courthouse

- Location within the U.S. state of South Dakota
- Coordinates: 44°01′N 97°07′W
- Country: United States
- State: South Dakota
- Founded: 1873
- Seat: Madison
- Largest city: Madison

Area
  - Total: 575 sq mi (1,490 km^{2})
  - Land: 563 sq mi (1,460 km^{2})
  - Water: 12 sq mi (31 km^{2}) 2.1%

Population (2020)
  - Total: 11,059
  - Estimate (2025): 10,993 ▼
  - Density: 19.5/sq mi (7.5/km^{2})
- Time zone: UTC−6 (Central)
  - Summer (DST): UTC−5 (CDT)
- Congressional district: At-large
- Website: www.lake.sd.gov

Lake County is a county in the U.S. state of South Dakota. As of the 2020 census, the population was 11,059. Its county seat is Madison. The county was formed in 1873.

== History ==
Lake County, South Dakota, was inhabited by the Sisseton Sioux when explorers, including Joseph Nicollet and John C. Fremont, first mapped the region in 1838–39 and noted its numerous lakes. The 1851 Treaty of Mendota with the Santee Sioux and 1858 Yankton Treaty opened the area for American settlement. The 1857 rescue of Mrs. Marble from among the captives of the Spirit Lake Massacre brought early non-Sioux attention to the area.

Permanent settlement began in 1870 when William Lee and Charles Walker established homesteads near Lake Madison, naming the town Madison after Madison, Wisconsin. Lake County was created on January 8, 1873, named for its many lakes, and organized on September 1, 1873, with Old Madison as the county seat. Brisk settlement followed in 1878 amidst the Dakota Boom, and the railroad’s arrival in 1881 spurred growth, with towns like Ramona, Wentworth, and Winfred emerging. By 1880, the county’s population reached 2,657.

Agriculture drove economic progress in the 1870s and 1880s, and Madison became a commercial hub with businesses like the Lake County Flouring Mill (opened 1881), newspapers such as the Madison Sentinel (1879), and the Madison Normal School (1883).

== Geography ==
The terrain of Lake County consists of rolling hills, with the area devoted to agriculture. A tributary of the East Fork Vermillion River flows south-southeastward through the lower western part of the county, and Buffalo Creek flows southeastward from the central part of the county, leaving the county near its southeast corner. The terrain generally slopes to the south, although high points (ca. 1,814' ASL) are found on the north and south boundary lines and points between.

Lake County has a total area of 575 square miles (1,490 km^{2}), of which 563 square miles (1,460 km^{2}) is land and 12 square miles (31 km^{2}) (2.1%) is water.

=== Lakes ===
- Buffalo Slough
- Brant Lake
- Davis Slough
- Gilman Lake
- Green Lake
- Lake Badus
- Lake Herman
- Lake Madison
- Long Lake
- Mud Lake
- Pelican Lake
- Round Lake
- Spring Lake
- Lake Henry
- Molumby Slough
- Quam Slough
- Thompson Slough

=== Protected areas ===
- Lake Herman State Park
- Walker's Point State Recreation Area

=== Major highways ===
- U.S. Highway 81
- South Dakota Highway 19
- South Dakota Highway 34

=== Adjacent counties ===
- Brookings County – northeast
- Moody County – east
- Minnehaha County – southeast
- McCook County – southwest
- Miner County – west
- Kingsbury County – northwest

== Demographics ==
Historical population
Census	Pop.	Note	%±
1880	2,657		—
1890	7,508		182.6%
1900	9,137		21.7%
1910	10,711		17.2%
1920	12,257		14.4%
1930	12,379		1.0%
1940	12,412		0.3%
1950	11,792		−5.0%
1960	11,764		−0.2%
1970	11,456		−2.6%
1980	10,724		−6.4%
1990	10,550		−1.6%
2000	11,276		6.9%
2010	11,200		−0.7%
2020	11,059		−1.3%
2025 (est.)	10,993	▼	−0.6%
U.S. Decennial Census:

=== 2020 census ===
As of the 2020 census, there were 11,059 people, 4,576 households, and 2,804 families residing in the county. Of the residents, 22.0% were under the age of 18 and 19.7% were 65 years of age or older; the median age was 40.0 years. For every 100 females there were 109.5 males, and for every 100 females age 18 and over there were 108.8 males.

The population density was 19.6 inhabitants per square mile (7.6/km^{2}). There were 5,658 housing units, of which 19.1% were vacant. Among occupied housing units, 71.2% were owner-occupied and 28.8% were renter-occupied. The homeowner vacancy rate was 1.8% and the rental vacancy rate was 12.5%.

The racial makeup of the county was 91.7% White, 1.0% Black or African American, 1.2% American Indian and Alaska Native, 0.6% Asian, 1.6% from some other race, and 3.8% from two or more races. Hispanic or Latino residents of any race comprised 5.5% of the population.

Of the 4,576 households, 25.1% had children under the age of 18 living with them and 20.4% had a female householder with no spouse or partner present. About 32.2% of all households were made up of individuals and 13.8% had someone living alone who was 65 years of age or older.

=== 2010 census ===
As of the 2010 census, there were 11,200 people, 4,483 households, and 2,814 families in the county. The population density was 19.9 inhabitants per square mile (7.7/km^{2}). There were 5,559 housing units at an average density of 9.9 units per square mile (3.8 units/km^{2}). The racial makeup of the county was 96.2% white, 0.7% Asian, 0.7% American Indian, 0.5% black or African American, 0.8% from other races, and 1.1% from two or more races. Those of Hispanic or Latino origin made up 1.6% of the population. In terms of ancestry, 50.7% were German, 20.6% were Norwegian, 12.4% were Irish, 6.6% were English, 6.2% were Dutch, 5.0% were Danish, and 5.0% were American.

Of the 4,483 households, 26.7% had children under the age of 18 living with them, 53.0% were married couples living together, 6.8% had a female householder with no husband present, 37.2% were non-families, and 30.9% of all households were made up of individuals. The average household size was 2.30 and the average family size was 2.88. The median age was 39.9 years.

The median income for a household in the county was $45,606 and the median income for a family was $57,753. Males had a median income of $36,370 versus $25,898 for females. The per capita income for the county was $22,447. About 6.5% of families and 12.1% of the population were below the poverty line, including 12.8% of those under age 18 and 8.8% of those age 65 or over.

== Communities ==
=== City ===
- Madison (county seat)

=== Towns ===
- Brant Lake
- Nunda
- Ramona

=== Village ===
- Wentworth

=== Census-designated places ===
- Brant Lake South
- Chester
- Graceville Colony
- Lake Madison
- Rustic Acres Colony
- Winfred

=== Other unincorporated communities ===
- Franklin
- Junius
- Rutland

=== Townships ===
- Badus
- Chester
- Clarno
- Concord
- Farmington
- Franklin
- Herman
- Lake View
- Le Roy
- Nunda
- Orland
- Rutland
- Summit
- Wayne
- Wentworth
- Winfred

=== Historical townsite ===
- Saranac

== Politics ==
Lake County voters have voted for Republican Party candidates in 62 percent of national elections since 1964.

United States presidential election results for Lake County, South Dakota
Year	Republican		Democratic		Third party(ies)	
Year	No.	%	No.	%	No.	%
1892	742	43.47%	196	11.48%	769	45.05%
1896	864	46.10%	999	53.31%	11	0.59%
1900	1,172	55.57%	901	42.72%	36	1.71%
1904	1,728	78.90%	260	11.87%	202	9.22%
1908	1,415	65.60%	636	29.49%	106	4.91%
1912	0	0.00%	657	33.50%	1,304	66.50%
1916	1,398	55.04%	1,027	40.43%	115	4.53%
1920	2,333	69.98%	398	11.94%	603	18.09%
1924	1,888	45.35%	297	7.13%	1,978	47.51%
1928	3,048	63.41%	1,744	36.28%	15	0.31%
1932	2,222	41.09%	3,090	57.15%	95	1.76%
1936	3,182	52.95%	2,520	41.94%	307	5.11%
1940	4,179	68.87%	1,889	31.13%	0	0.00%
1944	2,956	65.70%	1,543	34.30%	0	0.00%
1948	2,837	56.95%	2,093	42.01%	52	1.04%
1952	4,020	73.28%	1,466	26.72%	0	0.00%
1956	3,404	62.32%	2,058	37.68%	0	0.00%
1960	3,520	61.28%	2,224	38.72%	0	0.00%
1964	2,417	44.72%	2,988	55.28%	0	0.00%
1968	2,876	53.68%	2,294	42.81%	188	3.51%
1972	2,919	50.14%	2,886	49.57%	17	0.29%
1976	2,530	46.20%	2,930	53.51%	16	0.29%
1980	3,093	52.85%	2,207	37.71%	552	9.43%
1984	3,027	55.92%	2,367	43.73%	19	0.35%
1988	2,439	47.62%	2,663	51.99%	20	0.39%
1992	1,890	33.81%	2,388	42.72%	1,312	23.47%
1996	1,966	38.41%	2,526	49.36%	626	12.23%
2000	2,724	52.85%	2,331	45.23%	99	1.92%
2004	3,359	55.92%	2,509	41.77%	139	2.31%
2008	2,993	48.61%	3,033	49.26%	131	2.13%
2012	3,419	54.40%	2,724	43.34%	142	2.26%
2016	4,038	59.50%	2,314	34.10%	434	6.40%
2020	3,681	62.68%	2,068	35.21%	124	2.11%
2024	3,819	64.66%	1,978	33.49%	109	1.85%

== Education ==
School districts include:

- Chester Area School District 39-1
- Colman-Egan School District 50-5
- Madison Central School District 39-2
- McCook Central School District 43-7
- Oldham-Ramona-Rutland School District 39-6
- Sioux Valley School District 05-5

The Oldham-Ramona School District 39-5 and Rutland School District 39-4, in the county, consolidated into ORR in 2023.

== See also ==
- National Register of Historic Places listings in Lake County, South Dakota
