= Chester Area School District 39-1 =

School district in South Dakota, United States

Chester Area School District

Address
- 102 2nd Ave. Chester, Lake County, South Dakota, 57016; United States

District information
- Grades: PK - 12
- Superintendent: Kimberly Kludt
- NCES District ID: 4612300

Students and staff
- Enrollment: 542
- Student–teacher ratio: 14:1

Other information
- Telephone: (605) 489–2411
- Website: www.chester.k12.sd.us

The Chester Area School District 39–1 is a public school district in Lake County, South Dakota, based in Chester, South Dakota.

A portion of the district extends into Minnehaha County and Moody County.

== Schools ==
School	Students	Grades
Chester Area Cyber School	101	9–12
Chester Elementary	148	PK–5
Chester High School	103	9–12
Chester Middle School	69	6–8
Graceville Colony	21	KG–8
High Plains	61	9–12
Rustic Acres Elementary	39	KG–8

== Demographics ==
=== Enrollment by diversity ===
Category	Percentage
White	97.4%
Two or more races	1.5%
Hispanic/Latino	0.9%
Native Hawaiian or Other Pacific Islander	0.2%

=== Enrollment by gender ===
Category	Percentage
Male	50%
Female	50%
