= Brant Lake (South Dakota) =

Lake in the state of South Dakota, United States

- Location within South Dakota Location within the United States
- Location: South Dakota
- Coordinates: 43°55′17″N 96°56′54″W
- Type: lake
- Surface elevation: 1,598 feet (487 m)

Brant Lake is a lake in South Dakota, in the United States.

Brant Lake was named for the frequent brant geese at the lake.

== See also ==
- List of lakes in South Dakota
