= Area code 605 =

Area code for South Dakota, United States

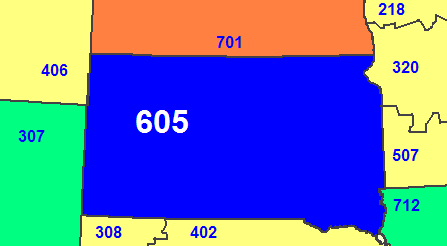
South Dakota's single numbering plan area and area code

Area code 605 is the telephone area code in the North American Numbering Plan (NANP) for the entire U.S. state of South Dakota. The numbering plan area was designated in 1947, when the American Telephone and Telegraph Company (AT&T) devised a comprehensive telephone numbering plan for the United States and Canada.

Before October 2021, area code 605 had telephone numbers assigned for the central office code 988. In 2020, 988 was designated nationwide as a dialing code for the National Suicide Prevention Lifeline, which created a conflict for exchanges that permit seven-digit dialing. Area code 605 was therefore scheduled to transition to ten-digit dialing by October 24, 2021.

Projections of 2023 suggested that South Dakota's numbering plan area will require relief action to avoid exhaustion of central office prefixes by late 2026. Such actions were taken, and the deadline is now extended to a projection of 2033.

== Service area ==
The numbering plan area includes the following communities, which are serviced by the listed central office prefixes.

- Aberdeen: 216, 225, 226, 228, 229, 252, 262, 277, 290, 377, 380, 622, 626, 715, 725, 824, 846
- Alcester: 934
- Alexandria: 239
- Alpena: 849
- Andover: 298
- Arlington: 315, 983
- Armour: 572, 724,
- Artesian: 527
- Astoria: 832
- Avon: 286
- Baltic: 529
- Belle Fourche: 210, 568, 569, 699, 723, 892
- Belvidere: 344
- Beresford: 300, 751, 763, 957
- Big Stone City: 541, 862
- Bison: 244
- Blunt: 962
- Bonesteel: 654
- Bowdle: 281, 282, 285
- Bradley: 784
- Brandon: 582, 839
- Brandt: 876
- Bridgewater: 729
- Bristol: 492
- Britton: 448, 470, 551
- Brookings: 560, 592, 651, 688, 690, 691, 692, 693, 695, 697
- Buffalo: 375
- Buffalo Gap: 833
- Burke: 775
- Camp Crook: 797
- Canistota: 296
- Canova: 523
- Canton: 558, 764, 836, 987
- Castlewood: 414, 793, 804
- Cavour: 599
- Center: 247
- Centerville: 552, 563
- Chamberlain: 234, 730, 734, 815, 888
- Chester: 489
- Claire City: 652
- Claremont: 294
- Clark: 233, 532, 844
- Clear Lake: 874
- Colton: 446, 671
- Columbia: 396
- Conde: 382
- Corsica: 946
- Cresbard: 324
- Crooks: 465, 543
- Custer: 440, 517, 673
- Dell Rapids: 428, 963
- Delmont: 779
- De Smet: 854, 860, 861
- Doland: 635
- Dupree: 200, 365, 538, 821
- Eagle Butte: 218, 964
- Edgemont: 662
- Elk Point: 205, 356, 761, 952
- Elkton: 542, 922
- Emery: 449
- Estelline: 686, 873
- Ethan: 227
- Eureka: 284
- Faith: 739, 967
- Faulkton: 598
- Flandreau: 530, 534, 573, 633, 684, 864, 997
- Florence: 758
- Fort Pierre: 220, 222, 223, 224, 280, 295, 301, 494, 609, 773, 776, 945
- Frederick: 329
- Freeman: 925
- Garretson: 594
- Gary: 272
- Gettysburg: 765, 769, 771
- Glenham: 762, 848, 850
- Goodwin: 795
- Gregory: 830, 831, 835
- Groton: 397
- Harrisburg: 213, 214, 368, 408, 498, 667, 743, 767, 777
- Harrold: 875
- Hartford: 528, 953
- Hayti: 783, 792
- Hecla: 994
- Hermosa: 255
- Herreid: 437
- Highmore: 478, 852, 870, 871
- Hill City: 307, 574
- Hitchcock: 266
- Hosmer: 283
- Hot Springs: 745, 890, 891
- Hoven: 948
- Howard: 579, 772, 851
- Hudson: 984
- Humboldt: 363
- Hurley: 238
- Huron: 350, 352, 353, 354, 412, 461, 554, 570, 931, 936, 960, 968
- Interior: 433
- Ipswich: 410, 426
- Irene: 263
- Iroquois: 546
- Isabel: 466
- Jefferson: 966
- Kadoka: 488, 837
- Kennebec: 869
- Keystone: 666
- Kimball: 680, 682, 778
- Lake Andes: 469, 481, 487, 491
- Lake Norden: 710, 785
- Langford: 493
- Lebanon: 768
- Lemmon: 374
- Lennox: 647, 744, 750
- Leola: 439
- Lesterville: 364,
- Letcher: 248
- Long Lake: 577
- McIntosh: 273, 524
- McLaughlin: 314
- Madison: 256, 270, 291, 427, 480, 556, 636
- Marion: 648
- Martin: 407, 441, 454, 685, 899, 944, 970, 980
- Mellette: 887
- Menno: 387
- Midland: 843
- Milbank: 432, 434, 438, 445, 467, 924, 949
- Miller: 204, 453, 853, 893
- Mission: 319, 828, 856
- Mitchell: 292, 299, 550, 597, 630, 656, 770, 933, 990, 995, 996, 999
- Mobridge: 230, 823, 845, 926
- Mound City: 955
- Mount Vernon: 236
- Murdo: 516, 669
- New Effington: 637
- New Holland: 243
- Newell: 456
- New Underwood: 754
- Nisland: 257
- North Cody: 822
- North Naper: 834
- North Sioux City: 217, 232, 235, 242, 422, 540, 585, 780, 979
- Nunda: 586
- Oelrichs: 535
- Oldham: 482
- Onaka: 447
- Onida: 973
- Orient: 392
- Parker: 297
- Parkston: 505, 928
- Peever: 932
- Philip: 859
- Pierpont: 325
- Pierre: 220, 222, 223, 224, 280, 295, 301, 494, 609, 773, 776, 945
- Plankinton: 942
- Platte: 207, 337, 613
- Pollock: 889
- Presho: 895
- Pukwana: 894
- Quinn: 386
- Ramona: 482
- Rapid City: 209, 219, 341, 342, 343, 348, 355, 381, 385, 388, 389, 390, 391, 393, 394, 399, 415, 430, 431, 484, 519, 545, 593, 600, 646, 716, 718, 719, 721, 727, 737, 755, 786, 787, 791, 858, 863, 872, 877, 923, 939
- Redfield: 302, 313, 450, 460, 468, 472, 475
- Ree Heights: 943
- Reliance: 473
- Revillo: 623
- Roscoe: 276, 287
- Rosholt: 537
- Roslyn: 420, 486
- Salem: 240, 421, 425, 471
- Scotland: 583
- Selby: 643, 649
- Seneca: 436
- Sinai: 826
- Sioux Falls: 201, 212, 215, 221, 231, 241, 250, 251, 254, 261, 271, 274, 275, 305, 306, 310, 312, 321, 322, 323, 328, 330, 331, 332, 333, 334, 335, 336, 338, 339, 351, 357, 359, 360, 361, 362, 366, 367, 370, 371, 373, 376, 400, 403, 404, 413, 444, 496, 504, 509, 521, 553, 575, 595, 610, 679, 681, 705, 728, 731, 740, 759, 782, 789, 799, 800, 809, 838, 900, 906, 929, 937, 940, 941, 951, 961, 965, 977, 978, 988
- Sisseton: 268, 419, 698, 742, 927
- South Shore: 756
- Spearfish: 269, 340, 443, 549, 559, 566, 571, 578, 580, 584, 591, 631, 639, 641, 642, 644, 645, 717, 722, 920
- Spencer: 246
- Springfield: 369
- Stickney: 732
- Stockholm: 676
- Sturgis: 206, 347, 423, 490, 499, 561, 702, 720
- Summit: 398
- Tabor: 463
- Tea: 213, 214, 368, 408, 498, 667, 743, 767, 777
- Timber Lake: 865
- Tolstoy: 442
- Toronto: 794
- Tripp: 935
- Tulare: 596
- Turton: 897
- Tyndall: 464, 589
- Valley Springs: 757
- Veblen: 738
- Vermillion: 202, 581, 624, 638, 658, 659, 670, 672, 675, 677, 741
- Viborg: 326, 766
- Volga: 627, 827, 930
- Wagner: 384
- Wakonda: 267, 451
- Wall: 279, 515
- Wasta: 993
- Watertown: 237, 520, 753, 818, 868, 878, 880, 881, 882, 884, 886, 954, 956
- Waubay: 435, 947
- Webster: 265, 345, 588, 590
- Wentworth: 483
- Wessington: 458
- Wessington Springs: 539
- West Jasper: 349
- White: 304, 629
- White Lake: 249
- White River: 259
- Wilmot: 938
- Winner: 208, 840, 841, 842
- Wolsey: 497, 883
- Wood: 452
- Woonsocket: 796
- Worthing: 372
- Yankton: 260, 500, 653, 655, 660, 661, 664, 665, 668, 689, 760, 857, 975
- Premium calls (unassigned): 211, 308, 311, 320, 402, 406, 411, 476, 507, 511, 531, 536, 555, 605, 611, 621, 663, 700, 701, 711, 712, 811, 911, 921, 950, 958, 959, 976, 988 (come October 2021).

== See also ==
- List of North American Numbering Plan area codes
- Original North American area codes

South Dakota area codes: 605
	North: 701	
West: 307, 406	605	East: 320, 507/924, 712
	South: 402/531, 308	
North Dakota area codes: 701
Iowa area codes: 319, 515, 563, 641, 712
Minnesota area codes: 218, 320, 507/924, 612, 651, 763, 952
Montana area codes: 406
Wyoming area codes: 307
