= Madison, South Dakota =

- City
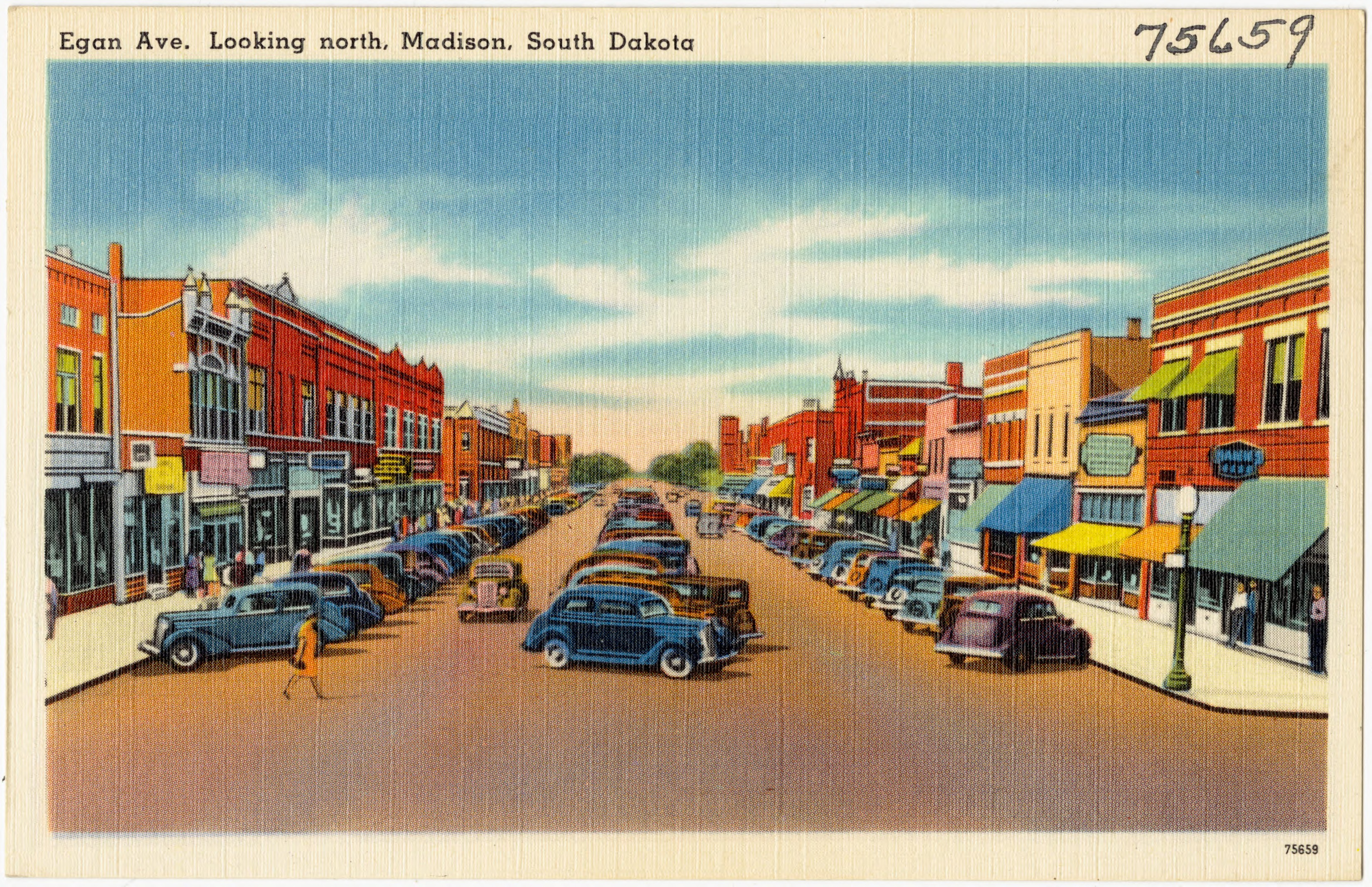
- 1930s postcard showing Egan Ave. looking north, Madison, South Dakota
- Motto: Discover the Unexpected
- Location in Lake County and the state of South Dakota
- Coordinates: 44°00′05″N 97°07′25″W
- Country: United States
- State: South Dakota
- County: Lake
- Founded: 1880
- Incorporated: 1885

Government
  - Mayor: Roy Lindsay

Area
  - Total: 4.61 sq mi (11.95 km^{2})
  - Land: 4.61 sq mi (11.95 km^{2})
  - Water: 0 sq mi (0.00 km^{2})
- Elevation: 1,673 ft (510 m)

Population (2020)
  - Total: 6,191
  - Density: 1,341.3/sq mi (517.87/km^{2})
- Time zone: UTC−6 (Central)
  - Summer (DST): UTC−5 (CDT)
- Zip code: 57042
- Area code: 605
- FIPS code: 46-40220
- GNIS feature ID: 1267469
- Website: www.cityofmadisonsd.gov

Madison is a city in and the county seat of Lake County, South Dakota, United States. The population was 6,191 at the 2020 census. It is home to Dakota State University.

== Geography ==
Madison is located in the center of Lake County in southeastern South Dakota, 31 miles (50 km) northwest of Sioux Falls, 21 miles (34 km) southwest of Brookings, and 157 miles (253 km) east of Pierre. It is situated between Lake Herman and Lake Madison.

Two small streams flow through Madison named Silver Creek and Park Creek. Although rarely, these creeks are known to flood after heavy rain events.

According to the United States Census Bureau, the city has a total area of 4.61 square miles (11.94 km^{2}), all land.

=== Climate ===
Climate data for Madison 2SE, South Dakota (1991−2020 normals, extremes 1961−present)
| Month | Jan | Feb | Mar | Apr | May | Jun | Jul | Aug | Sep | Oct | Nov | Dec | Year |
|---|---|---|---|---|---|---|---|---|---|---|---|---|---|
| Record high °F (°C) | 66 (19) | 68 (20) | 84 (29) | 94 (34) | 98 (37) | 105 (41) | 104 (40) | 104 (40) | 102 (39) | 89 (32) | 80 (27) | 64 (18) | 105 (41) |
| Mean maximum °F (°C) | 45.5 (7.5) | 50.1 (10.1) | 66.3 (19.1) | 80.1 (26.7) | 87.2 (30.7) | 92.6 (33.7) | 94.0 (34.4) | 93.1 (33.9) | 88.4 (31.3) | 82.1 (27.8) | 64.7 (18.2) | 48.3 (9.1) | 96.2 (35.7) |
| Mean daily maximum °F (°C) | 23.7 (−4.6) | 28.5 (−1.9) | 41.2 (5.1) | 55.6 (13.1) | 68.1 (20.1) | 78.2 (25.7) | 83.3 (28.5) | 80.9 (27.2) | 73.1 (22.8) | 58.7 (14.8) | 42.2 (5.7) | 28.7 (−1.8) | 55.2 (12.9) |
| Daily mean °F (°C) | 14.4 (−9.8) | 19.0 (−7.2) | 31.4 (−0.3) | 44.5 (6.9) | 57.0 (13.9) | 67.4 (19.7) | 72.1 (22.3) | 69.7 (20.9) | 61.4 (16.3) | 47.2 (8.4) | 32.4 (0.2) | 19.9 (−6.7) | 44.7 (7.1) |
| Mean daily minimum °F (°C) | 5.0 (−15.0) | 9.5 (−12.5) | 21.5 (−5.8) | 33.4 (0.8) | 45.9 (7.7) | 56.6 (13.7) | 60.9 (16.1) | 58.4 (14.7) | 49.6 (9.8) | 35.7 (2.1) | 22.6 (−5.2) | 11.0 (−11.7) | 34.2 (1.2) |
| Mean minimum °F (°C) | −17.4 (−27.4) | −12.3 (−24.6) | −3.2 (−19.6) | 16.1 (−8.8) | 30.4 (−0.9) | 43.0 (6.1) | 47.8 (8.8) | 45.2 (7.3) | 31.6 (−0.2) | 18.2 (−7.7) | 2.5 (−16.4) | −11.9 (−24.4) | −20.9 (−29.4) |
| Record low °F (°C) | −33 (−36) | −31 (−35) | −23 (−31) | 1 (−17) | 17 (−8) | 35 (2) | 39 (4) | 35 (2) | 22 (−6) | 4 (−16) | −17 (−27) | −31 (−35) | −33 (−36) |
| Average precipitation inches (mm) | 0.46 (12) | 0.66 (17) | 1.03 (26) | 2.70 (69) | 3.74 (95) | 4.24 (108) | 3.33 (85) | 3.38 (86) | 3.21 (82) | 2.16 (55) | 0.85 (22) | 0.61 (15) | 26.37 (670) |
| Average snowfall inches (cm) | 5.6 (14) | 8.4 (21) | 5.0 (13) | 4.2 (11) | 0.1 (0.25) | 0.0 (0.0) | 0.0 (0.0) | 0.0 (0.0) | 0.0 (0.0) | 0.8 (2.0) | 4.9 (12) | 7.8 (20) | 36.8 (93) |
| Average precipitation days (≥ 0.01 in) | 4.5 | 5.4 | 5.4 | 9.1 | 11.5 | 11.4 | 8.8 | 7.9 | 7.4 | 6.6 | 4.3 | 4.7 | 87.0 |
| Average snowy days (≥ 0.1 in) | 3.5 | 4.3 | 2.3 | 1.3 | 0.0 | 0.0 | 0.0 | 0.0 | 0.0 | 0.6 | 1.8 | 3.6 | 17.4 |
Source: NOAA

== Demographics ==
Historical population
| Census | Pop. | Note | %± |
|---|---|---|---|
| 1880 | 96 | | — |
| 1890 | 1,736 | | 1,708.3% |
| 1900 | 2,550 | | 46.9% |
| 1910 | 3,137 | | 23.0% |
| 1920 | 4,144 | | 32.1% |
| 1930 | 4,289 | | 3.5% |
| 1940 | 5,018 | | 17.0% |
| 1950 | 5,153 | | 2.7% |
| 1960 | 5,420 | | 5.2% |
| 1970 | 6,315 | | 16.5% |
| 1980 | 6,210 | | −1.7% |
| 1990 | 6,257 | | 0.8% |
| 2000 | 6,540 | | 4.5% |
| 2010 | 6,474 | | −1.0% |
| 2020 | 6,191 | | −4.4% |
U.S. Decennial Census; 2017 Estimate

=== 2020 census ===
As of the 2020 census, Madison had a population of 6,191. The median age was 34.5 years. 21.4% of residents were under the age of 18 and 18.2% of residents were 65 years of age or older. For every 100 females there were 108.5 males, and for every 100 females age 18 and over there were 107.9 males age 18 and over.

99.6% of residents lived in urban areas, while 0.4% lived in rural areas.

There were 2,595 households in Madison, of which 24.0% had children under the age of 18 living in them. Of all households, 40.1% were married-couple households, 26.2% were households with a male householder and no spouse or partner present, and 27.1% were households with a female householder and no spouse or partner present. About 39.2% of all households were made up of individuals and 16.0% had someone living alone who was 65 years of age or older.

There were 2,937 housing units, of which 11.6% were vacant. The homeowner vacancy rate was 2.2% and the rental vacancy rate was 12.9%.

Racial composition as of the 2020 census
| Race | Number | Percent |
|---|---|---|
| White | 5,450 | 88.0% |
| Black or African American | 104 | 1.7% |
| American Indian and Alaska Native | 109 | 1.8% |
| Asian | 65 | 1.0% |
| Native Hawaiian and Other Pacific Islander | 9 | 0.1% |
| Some other race | 151 | 2.4% |
| Two or more races | 303 | 4.9% |
| Hispanic or Latino (of any race) | 548 | 8.9% |

=== 2010 census ===
As of the census of 2010, there were 6,474 people, 2,627 households, and 1,449 families living in the city. The population density was 1,404.3 inhabitants per square mile (542.2/km^{2}). There were 2,848 housing units at an average density of 617.8 per square mile (238.5/km^{2}). The racial makeup of the city was 94.5% White, 0.7% African American, 0.9% Native American, 1.1% Asian, 1.3% from other races, and 1.5% from two or more races. Hispanic or Latino of any race were 2.4% of the population.

There were 2,627 households, of which 26.5% had children under the age of 18 living with them, 42.6% were married couples living together, 9.4% had a female householder with no husband present, 3.2% had a male householder with no wife present, and 44.8% were non-families. 37.3% of all households were made up of individuals, and 14.2% had someone living alone who was 65 years of age or older. The average household size was 2.22 and the average family size was 2.93.

The median age in the city was 34.6 years. 20.6% of residents were under the age of 18; 18.1% were between the ages of 18 and 24; 20.4% were from 25 to 44; 23.6% were from 45 to 64; and 17.3% were 65 years of age or older. The gender makeup of the city was 49.8% male and 50.2% female.

=== 2000 census ===
As of the census of 2000, there were 6,540 people, 2,589 households, and 1,491 families living in the city. The population density was 1,529.4 inhabitants per square mile (590.5/km^{2}). There were 2,706 housing units at an average density of 632.8 per square mile (244.3/km^{2}). The racial makeup of the city was 97.16% White, 0.24% African American, 0.81% Native American, 0.76% Asian, 0.02% Pacific Islander, 0.40% from other races, and 0.61% from two or more races. Hispanic or Latino of any race were 0.92% of the population.

There were 2,589 households, out of which 26.6% had children under the age of 18 living with them, 47.2% were married couples living together, 7.5% had a female householder with no husband present, and 42.4% were non-families. 34.8% of all households were made up of individuals, and 16.7% had someone living alone who was 65 years of age or older. The average household size was 2.26 and the average family size was 2.94.

In the city, the population was spread out, with 21.3% under the age of 18, 21.0% from 18 to 24, 21.7% from 25 to 44, 17.4% from 45 to 64, and 18.6% who were 65 years of age or older. The median age was 33 years. For every 100 females, there were 93.7 males. For every 100 females age 18 and over, there were 93.2 males.

As of 2000 the median income for a household in the city was $30,434, and the median income for a family was $39,745. Males had a median income of $28,408 versus $20,965 for females. The per capita income for the city was $14,767. About 6.3% of families and 11.9% of the population were below the poverty line, including 12.2% of those under age 18 and 7.7% of those age 65 or over.

== History ==
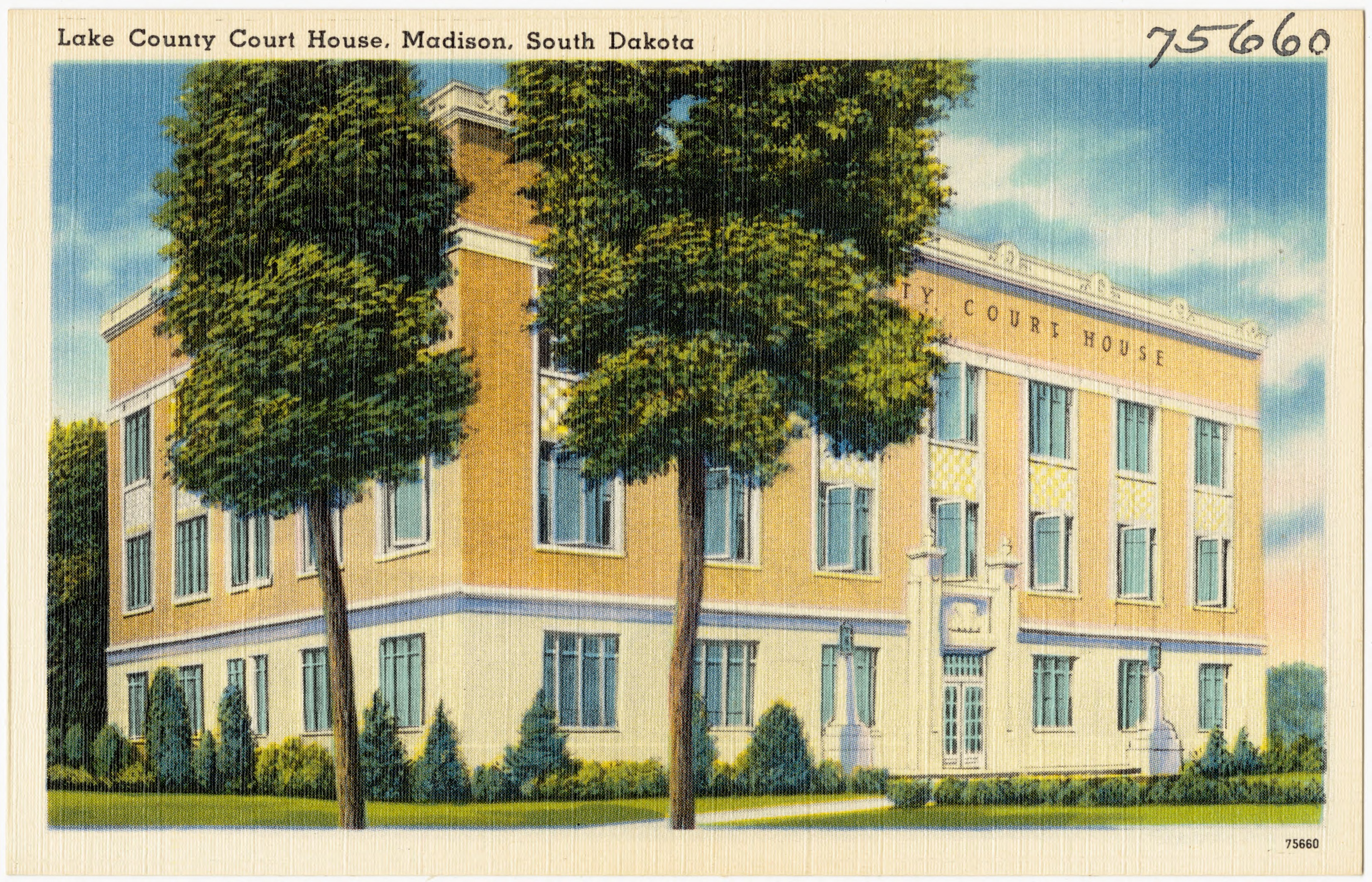
Lake County Court House, shown on a c. 1940 postcard

=== Early history and relocation ===
Madison's origin is defined by a unique relocation of settlers from Madison, Wisconsin driven by the arrival of the railroad. In the early 1870s, two competing settlements existed in the area: Old Madison, established in 1873 on the south shore of Lake Madison, and Herman, located on the shores of Lake Herman. In 1880, C.B. Kennedy, a local homesteader, negotiated with the Chicago, Milwaukee, and St. Paul Railroad to survey a route through his land, which sat in the fertile valley between the two lakes.

Recognizing that the railroad was essential for survival, Kennedy and his associates successfully lobbied the residents of Old Madison and Herman to relocate to his townsite, which became "New" Madison. While the move faced some local resistance including a brief but bitter rivalry over the location of the county seat many buildings were physically jacked up and hauled by ox teams across the prairie to the new site. The first train arrived in January 1881, and the city was officially incorporated in 1885.

=== Culture and preservation ===
To preserve the region's agricultural and pioneer history, Historic Prairie Village was established in 1966 on the shores of Lake Herman. The village features over 40 relocated historic buildings and the Smith-Zimmermann (Lake County Museum) Heritage Museum. It is home to the annual Prairie Village Steam Threshing Jamboree, a gathering that highlights the area's agricultural heritage with vintage machinery and steam powered demonstrations.

Agriculture has long been a central part of Madison's economy, with farming and livestock production being key industries. The establishment of Dakota State University in 1881 contributed to the city's growth, with the university evolving from a normal school into a recognized institution in cybersecurity and technology. Additionally, Madison hosts events like the Prairie Village Steam Threshing Jamboree, an annual gathering that highlights the area’s agricultural history.

=== 2022 derecho ===
On May 12, 2022, Madison was struck by a powerful derecho, a widespread and long-lived straight line windstorm. The event was preceded by an intense dust storm that carried topsoil from drought-stricken areas in Nebraska, turning the sky an eerie shade of green and reducing visibility to near zero.

A weather station at the Madison Municipal Airport recorded a peak wind gust of 97 mph, which remains one of the highest non tornadic wind speeds ever measured in the region. The storm caused significant infrastructure damage, including snapped power poles and flattened grain bins. It also devastated the city's historic tree canopy, resulting in many century old trees across residential neighborhoods and the Dakota State University campus. Following the storm, a Presidential Disaster Declaration was issued for Lake County to assist with the widespread recovery efforts.

== Transportation ==
=== Roads ===
- U.S. Route 81
- S.D. Highway 34
- S.D. Highway 19 - Northern terminus is 3,000 feet (914 m) east of city limits

=== Railroad ===
Madison was once served by passenger trains of the Milwaukee Road. The former depot is now listed on the National Register of Historic Places.

== Development and education ==
Madison is served by the Madison Central School District 39-2. The district is centralized within the city and operates three family facilities: Madison Elementary: Serving grade K-5. Madison Middle School: Serving grade 6-8. Also, Madison High School: Serving grades 9-12. This district's athletic teams, known as the Bulldogs, compete in the Dakota Xll Conference. In addition to the public school system, the city has two private religious schools: St. Thomas School: A parochial Catholic school founded in 1929. It serves students from preschool through 5th grade and is affiliated with the St. Thomas Aquinas Catholic church. Madison Christian School (Formerly Grace Christian School) A non denominational private school serving grades K-8.

Agriculture has long been a central part of Madison's economy, with farming livestock production being key industries. The 1881 establishment of the Madison State Normal School (now known as Dakota State University) as the first teacher-training institution in the Dakota Territory further anchored the community.

A pivotal shift occurred in 1984 when the South Dakota Legislature transitioned the university's mission to focus on computer technology and information systems. This "Cyber Powerhouse" mission has since transformed Madison into a regional center for cybersecurity and high-tech industries, evolving the local economy from its purely agrarian roots.

== Notable people ==
Politics and courts:

- Casey Crabtree, member of the South Dakota Senate
- Harry A. Keegan, former member of the Wisconsin State Assembly
- Roberto Lange, United States federal judge
- Emma Louise Lowe - Musician, educator, former First Lady of American Samoa and Guam
- Richard Barrett Lowe, 29th governor of American Samoa and 8th governor of Guam
- Royal McCracken, who served in the South Dakota State Senate
- Karl Mundt, four-term U.S. senator
- Scott Parsley, member of the South Dakota State Senate
- Donald J. Porter, United States federal judge
- Rick Weiland, former U.S. Senate nominee
- Marli Wiese, member of the South Dakota House of Representatives
- Lori S. Wilbur, former justice of the South Dakota Supreme Court

Entertainment:

- Jessica Fjerstad, Miss South Dakota Teen USA 2002 and Miss South Dakota USA 2005
- Mary Hart, host of Entertainment Tonight
- Jerry Schemmel, radio voice of the Denver Nuggets and Colorado Rockies
- Hugh Smith, news anchor

Athletes:

- Clare Jacobs, pole vaulter who medaled in the Olympics.
- Charles McCallister, water polo player who competed in the 1932 and in the 1936 olympics
- Gene Vidal, athlete and aviator, father of Gore Vidal
- Josh Anderson, collegiate football player and coach

Academics:

- Kay Amert, scholar of French Renaissance printing and professor
- Maurice Nelles, engineer and professor

== Media ==
=== Radio ===
==== AM radio ====
AM radio stations
| Frequency | Call sign | Name | Format | Owner | City |
|---|---|---|---|---|---|
| 1390 AM | KJAM | Madison's Best | Classic Hits | [Christensen Broadcast Group Inc.] | Madison |

==== FM radio ====
FM radio stations
| Frequency | Call sign | Name | Format | Owner | City of license |
|---|---|---|---|---|---|
| 103.1 FM | KMZM | Jammin' Country | Country | Christensen Broadcast Group Inc. | Madison |
