= National Register of Historic Places listings in Aurora County, South Dakota =

Location of Aurora County in South Dakota

This is a list of the National Register of Historic Places listings in Aurora County, South Dakota.

This is intended to be a complete list of the properties on the National Register of Historic Places in Aurora County, South Dakota, United States. The locations of National Register properties for which the latitude and longitude coordinates are included below, may be seen in a map.

There are 9 properties listed on the National Register in the county. Another property was once listed but has since been removed.

This National Park Service list is complete through NPS recent listings posted December 12, 2025.

== Current listings ==
	Name on the Register	Image	Date listed	Location	City or town	Description
1	Aurora County Courthouse	Aurora County Courthouse	February 10, 1993 (#92001855)	Main St. between 4th and 5th Sts. 43°43′03″N 98°29′09″W	Plankinton	
2	Hilton House	Hilton House	November 8, 2000 (#00001352)	402 N. Main St. 43°43′50″N 98°42′49″W	White Lake	As of 2017, operated as Geyer Guesthouse
3	Hofmeister House	Hofmeister House	January 23, 2007 (#06001307)	209 E. 1st St. 43°43′35″N 98°42′42″W	White Lake	
4	Lincoln House	Lincoln House	February 14, 2002 (#02000023)	321 Main St. 43°35′20″N 98°26′15″W	Stickney	
5	Patten Consolidated School	Patten Consolidated School	August 22, 2008 (#08000797)	37196 241st St. 43°53′32″N 98°44′54″W	White Lake	part of the Schools in South Dakota Multiple Property Submission
6	Raesly House	Raesly House	May 19, 2004 (#04000472)	202 East Rd. 43°42′54″N 98°28′23″W	Plankinton	
7	William P. Smith House	William P. Smith House	May 19, 2004 (#04000471)	306 N. 3rd Ave. 43°35′32″N 98°26′18″W	Stickney	
8	Sweep Hotel	Sweep Hotel	February 10, 2005 (#05000033)	304 Main St. 43°42′44″N 98°29′06″W	Plankinton	
9	Underwood United Methodist Church	Underwood United Methodist Church	August 22, 2008 (#08000798)	24151–24161 County Road 11; 43°52′37″N 98°43′42″W	White Lake	

== Former listing ==
	Name on the Register	Image	Date listed	Date removed	Location	City or town	Description
1	South Dakota Department of Transportation Bridge No. 02-007-220		November 19, 1999 (#99001338)	March 26, 2008	Local Road over Platte Creek	White Lake vicinity	Replaced in 2004

== See also ==
- List of National Historic Landmarks in South Dakota
- National Register of Historic Places listings in South Dakota
