= National Register of Historic Places listings in McCook County, South Dakota =

Location of McCook County in South Dakota

This is a list of the National Register of Historic Places listings in McCook County, South Dakota.

This is intended to be a complete list of the properties and districts on the National Register of Historic Places in McCook County, South Dakota, United States. The locations of National Register properties and districts for which the latitude and longitude coordinates are included below, may be seen in a map.

There are 11 properties and districts listed on the National Register in the county.

This National Park Service list is complete through NPS recent listings posted December 12, 2025.

== Current listings ==
	Name on the Register	Image	Date listed	Location	City or town	Description
1	Archeological Site No. 39MK12		August 6, 1993 (#93000796)	Address restricted	Bridgewater	
2	Downtown Salem Historic District	Downtown Salem Historic District	January 28, 2004 (#03001527)	140, 200, and 201 N. Main; 43°43′31″N 97°23′24″W	Salem	
3	First Presbyterian Church		December 11, 2013 (#13000917)	351 N. Poplar; 43°33′05″N 97°30′04″W	Bridgewater	
4	Henry Kuhle House	Henry Kuhle House	January 16, 2008 (#08000053)	321 E. Washington; 43°43′51″N 97°23′06″W	Salem	
5	McCook County Courthouse	McCook County Courthouse	February 10, 1993 (#92001862)	130 W. Essex Ave. 43°43′41″N 97°23′15″W	Salem	
6	Ortman Hotel		February 21, 1997 (#97000144)	201 W. Main St. 43°35′52″N 97°17′28″W	Canistota	
7	St. Mary's Catholic Church	St. Mary's Catholic Church	June 19, 1985 (#85001354)	Vermont and Idaho Sts. 43°43′36″N 97°23′22″W	Salem	
8	Salem Rest Stop Tipi-Eastbound	Salem Rest Stop Tipi-Eastbound	January 20, 2015 (#14001181)	Mi. 362.2 on I-90; 43°39′57″N 97°25′20″W	Salem vicinity	
9	Salem Rest Stop Tipi-Westbound	Salem Rest Stop Tipi-Westbound	January 20, 2015 (#14001182)	Mi. 362.7 on I-90; 43°40′02″N 97°24′54″W	Salem vicinity	
10	South Dakota Dept. of Transportation Bridge No. 44-212-090		December 9, 1993 (#93001302)	Local road over the East Fork of the Vermillion River; 43°42′59″N 97°11′14″W	Montrose	
11	Stark Round Barn		June 6, 2001 (#01000637)	Southern side of 247th St, 0.1 miles east of the former Chicago and Northwestern railroad line 43°48′14″N 97°27′04″W	Unityville	

== Former listings ==
	Name on the Register	Image	Date listed	Date removed	Location	City or town	Description
1	South Dakota Dept. of Transportation Bridge No. 44-028-220		December 9, 1993 (#93001301)	March 26, 2008	Local rd. over Wolf Cr.	Bridgewater	

== See also ==
- List of National Historic Landmarks in South Dakota
- National Register of Historic Places listings in South Dakota
