= Salem Historic District =

Salem Historic District or variations with Downtown or Old may refer to:

in the United States

(by state)

- Salem Historic District (Salem, Connecticut), listed on the National Register of Historic Places (NRHP) in New London County, Connecticut
- Salem Downtown Historic District (Salem, Indiana)
- Downtown Salem District, Salem, Massachusetts
- Salem Common Historic District (Salem, Massachusetts)
- Salem Common Historic District (Salem, New Hampshire), listed on the NRHP in Rockingham County, New Hampshire
- Salem Historic District (New York)
- Old Salem Historic District, Winston-Salem, North Carolina
- West Salem Historic District, Winston-Salem, North Carolina, listed on the NRHP in Forsyth County, North Carolina
- Salem Downtown Historic District (Salem, Ohio)
- Salem Downtown State Street – Commercial Street Historic District, Salem, Oregon
- Downtown Salem Historic District (Salem, South Dakota), listed on the NRHP in McCook County, South Dakota
- Downtown Salem Historic District (Salem, Virginia), listed on the NRHP in Virginia
- Salem Historic District (Salem, West Virginia)
