= Kings & Dixon =

US architectural firm

Kings & Dixon was an architectural firm based in Mitchell, South Dakota. A number of its works are listed on the National Register of Historic Places.

It was a partnership formed in 1920 of Floyd F. Kings (1893-1939) and Walter J. Dixon (1894 - 1975). The firm was "one of the state's prominent architectural firms" and it "designed numerous government buildings, businesses, and residences." The firm designed Art Deco/Moderne style courthouses in the 1930s for Aurora, Davison, McCook, and Miner counties.

Kings grew up in Mitchell, attended Dakota Wesleyan College, and completed a degree (1917) at the School of Architecture and Engineering at the University of Michigan. He left for Florida in 1925 but returned after the stock market crash in 1929.

Dixon was born and raised in Cleveland, Ohio, and completed a degree (1918) at the University of Michigan. He served as mayor of Mitchell from 1940 to 1946.

They employed Georgian Revival in design of the Trierweiler House.

Works (by the firm or either architect individually) include:

- Dr. John Trierweiler House (1927), 301 Spruce St., Yankton, South Dakota, (Kings & Dixon), NRHP-listed
- Whittier School (1935), 410 W. Second Ave., Mitchell, SD, (Kings & Dixon), NRHP-listed
- Aurora County Courthouse (1939–40), Main St. between Fourth and Fifth Sts., Plankinton, SD, (Kings & Dixon), NRHP-listed
- Koch Apartments, 209 W. Second Ave., Mitchell, SD, (Kings & Dixon), NRHP-listed
- McCook County Courthouse, Essex Ave. between Nebraska and Main, Salem, SD, (Kings & Dixon), NRHP-listed
- First Presbyterian Church, Bridgewater, SD, (Walter J. Dixon), NRHP-listed
- One or more works in Mitchell Historic Commercial District, Mitchell, SD (Walter J. Dixon), NRHP-listed
- One or more works in Mitchell West Central Residential Historic District, Mitchell, SD (Walter J. Dixon; Floyd F. Kings), NRHP-listed, including:
  - Wilson Apartments (c.1929), 404 N. Duff St., Mitchell (believed to have been designed by Walter J. Dixon and Floyd F. Kings)
