= Downtown Historic District =

Downtown Historic District may refer to:

- Downtown Historic District (San Jose, California), listed on the NRHP in Santa Clara County, California
- Downtown Historic District (Washington, D.C.), listed on the NRHP in Washington, D.C.
- Downtown Historic District (Lafayette, Indiana), listed on the NRHP in Indiana
- Downtown Historic District (Galesville, Wisconsin), listed on the NRHP in Wisconsin
- Downtown Historic District (Sheboygan Falls, Wisconsin), listed on the NRHP in Wisconsin
- Downtown Historic District (Waukesha, Wisconsin), listed on the NRHP in Wisconsin
- Burlington Downtown Historic District, listed on the NRHP in Wisconsin
- Cedar Falls Downtown Historic District, listed on the NRHP in Iowa
- Clinton Historic District (disambiguation), several districts
- Dallas Downtown Historic District, listed on the NRHP in Texas
- Hudson Downtown Historic District, listed on the NRHP in Michigan
- Olympia Downtown Historic District, listed on the NRHP in Washington
- Provo Downtown Historic District, listed on the NRHP in Utah
- Salem Historic District (disambiguation), several districts

== See also ==
- Downtown Commercial Historic District (disambiguation)
