= Salem Common Historic District =

Salem Common Historic District can refer to:

- Salem Common Historic District (Salem, Massachusetts), listed on the National Register of Historic Places (NRHP) in Essex County, Massachusetts
- Salem Common Historic District (Salem, New Hampshire), listed on the NRHP in Rockingham County, New Hampshire
