= Trierweiler (disambiguation) =

Trierweiler is a municipality in Germany.

Trierweiler may also refer to:

- Valérie Trierweiler (born 1965), French journalist and former partner of François Hollande
- Ben Trierweiler, skier in the FIS Alpine World Ski Championships 2011 – Men's giant slalom

== See also ==
- Dr. John Trierweiler House, listed in the National Register of Historic Places in Yankton County, South Dakota
- Trier, a city in Germany
- Weiler (disambiguation)
