= National Register of Historic Places listings in Davison County, South Dakota =

Location of Davison County in South Dakota

This is a list of the National Register of Historic Places listings in Davison County, South Dakota.

This is intended to be a complete list of the properties and districts on the National Register of Historic Places in Davison County, South Dakota, United States. The locations of National Register properties and districts for which the latitude and longitude coordinates are included below, may be seen in a map.

There are 26 properties and districts listed on the National Register in the county, including 1 National Historic Landmark.

This National Park Service list is complete through NPS recent listings posted May 8, 2026.

== Current listings ==
	Name on the Register	Image	Date listed	Location	City or town	Description
1	John F. Anderson House	John F. Anderson House	July 1, 1982 (#82003925)	323 N. Duff; 43°42′39″N 98°01′45″W	Mitchell	
2	Whittier and Virginia Bauer House	Whittier and Virginia Bauer House	March 1, 2010 (#10000048)	600 E. 4th Ave. 43°42′45″N 98°01′07″W	Mitchell	
3	Louis Beckwith House	Louis Beckwith House	July 1, 1982 (#82003926)	1311 S. Duff Dr. 43°41′51″N 98°01′42″W	Mitchell	
4	E. B. Bobb House	E. B. Bobb House	October 31, 2002 (#02001282)	501 E. 4th St. 43°42′45″N 98°01′12″W	Mitchell	
5	C. E. Chambers House	C. E. Chambers House	January 26, 1990 (#89002334)	322 W. 11th St. 43°43′11″N 98°01′45″W	Mitchell	
6	Dakota Wesleyan University	Dakota Wesleyan University	December 22, 1976 (#76001727)	Bounded by E. and W. University Aves. and McCabe St. 43°41′55″N 98°01′51″W	Mitchell	
7	Ellis and Roberta Henline Farmstead		November 29, 2010 (#10000950)	39987 252nd St. 43°43′54″N 98°12′32″W	Mount Vernon vicinity	
8	W. S. Hill House	W. S. Hill House	June 19, 2009 (#09000445)	520 East 6th Avenue; 43°42′52″N 98°01′11″W	Mitchell	
9	Holy Family Church, School, and Rectory	Holy Family Church, School, and Rectory	December 12, 1976 (#76001729)	Kimball and Davison Sts., E. 2nd and E. 3rd Aves. 43°42′40″N 98°01′18″W	Mitchell	
10	Kibbee-Nepstad House	Kibbee-Nepstad House	September 22, 1995 (#95001122)	409 E. 5th Ave. 43°42′49″N 98°01′19″W	Mitchell	
11	Koch Apartments	Koch Apartments	October 31, 1996 (#94000562)	209 W. 2nd Ave. 43°42′39″N 98°01′38″W	Mitchell	
12	William Koch House	William Koch House	October 31, 1996 (#94000566)	201 W. 2nd St. 43°42′39″N 98°01′36″W	Mitchell	
13	Mitchell Historic Commercial District	Mitchell Historic Commercial District	June 27, 1975 (#75001716)	210 S.-604 N. Main, 119-201 W. 3rd St., 117-219 E. 4th St., and 112-220 W. 5th St.; also roughly bounded by Duff, Railroad and Lawler Sts.; also roughly bounded by Lawler St., Railroad Ave., Rowley St., and 6th Ave. 43°42′39″N 98°01′29″W	Mitchell	Second and third sets of addresses represents boundary changes
14	Mitchell Lustron Historic District	Mitchell Lustron Historic District	December 2, 1998 (#98001402)	Roughly along Vincent Place, from Miller Ave. to Mitchell Boulevard; 43°41′55″N 98°02′21″W	Mitchell	A grouping of three Lustron homes in Mitchell. Initial listing included a fourth home, which was subsequently demolished.
15	Mitchell Site	Mitchell Site	October 15, 1966 (#66000712)	3200 Indian Village Road; 43°44′30″N 98°02′02″W	Mitchell	An archaeological site of a prehistoric Mississippian culture village. Open to the public.
16	Mitchell West Central Residential Historic District	Mitchell West Central Residential Historic District	June 16, 1999 (#99000676)	Roughly bounded by 1st and 7th Aves. 43°42′46″N 98°01′40″W	Mitchell	
17	Mount Vernon City Auditorium		January 13, 2022 (#100007416)	Main St. and East 1st Ave. 43°42′39″N 98°15′38″W	Mount Vernon	
18	Gottlieb and Friederike Scheurenbrand House	Gottlieb and Friederike Scheurenbrand House	February 16, 2018 (#100002101)	700 E Hanson St. 43°42′31″N 98°01′01″W	Mitchell	
19	Louis N. and Helen Seaman House	Louis N. and Helen Seaman House	February 16, 2018 (#100002100)	300 E 3rd St. 43°42′41″N 98°01′21″W	Mitchell	
20	Site 39DV24		January 31, 1984 (#84003260)	Address restricted	Mitchell	
21	Site 39DV9		January 31, 1984 (#84003275)	Address restricted	Riverside	
22	South Dakota Dept. of Transportation Bridge No. 18-040-137		December 9, 1993 (#93001282)	Local road over Enemy Creek; 43°38′52″N 98°14′45″W	Mitchell	
23	South Dakota Dept. of Transportation Bridge No. 18-060-202		December 9, 1993 (#93001283)	Local road over Twelve Mile Creek; 43°45′48″N 98°04′13″W	Mitchell	Relocated in 2010.
24	South Dakota Dept. of Transportation Bridge No. 18-100-052		December 9, 1993 (#93001284)	Local road over Firesteel Creek; 43°46′16″N 98°07′34″W	Loomis	
25	L.J. Welch House	L.J. Welch House	October 19, 1989 (#89001722)	608 E. 4th Ave. 43°42′45″N 98°01′02″W	Mitchell	
26	Whittier School	Whittier School	January 25, 2007 (#06001309)	410 W. 2nd Ave. 43°42′46″N 98°01′49″W	Mitchell	

== Former listings ==
	Name on the Register	Image	Date listed	Date removed	Location	City or town	Description
1	South Dakota Dept. of Transportation Bridge No. 18-142-150		December 9, 1993 (#93001285)	December 15, 1999	Local rd. over Enemy Cr.	Mitchell vicinity	

== See also ==
- List of National Historic Landmarks in South Dakota
- National Register of Historic Places listings in South Dakota
