= Unityville =

Unityville may refer to:

- Unityville, Pennsylvania, an unincorporated community in Pennsylvania
- Unityville, South Dakota, an unincorporated community in South Dakota
