= Raesly House =

Historic house in South Dakota, United States

- U.S. National Register of Historic Places
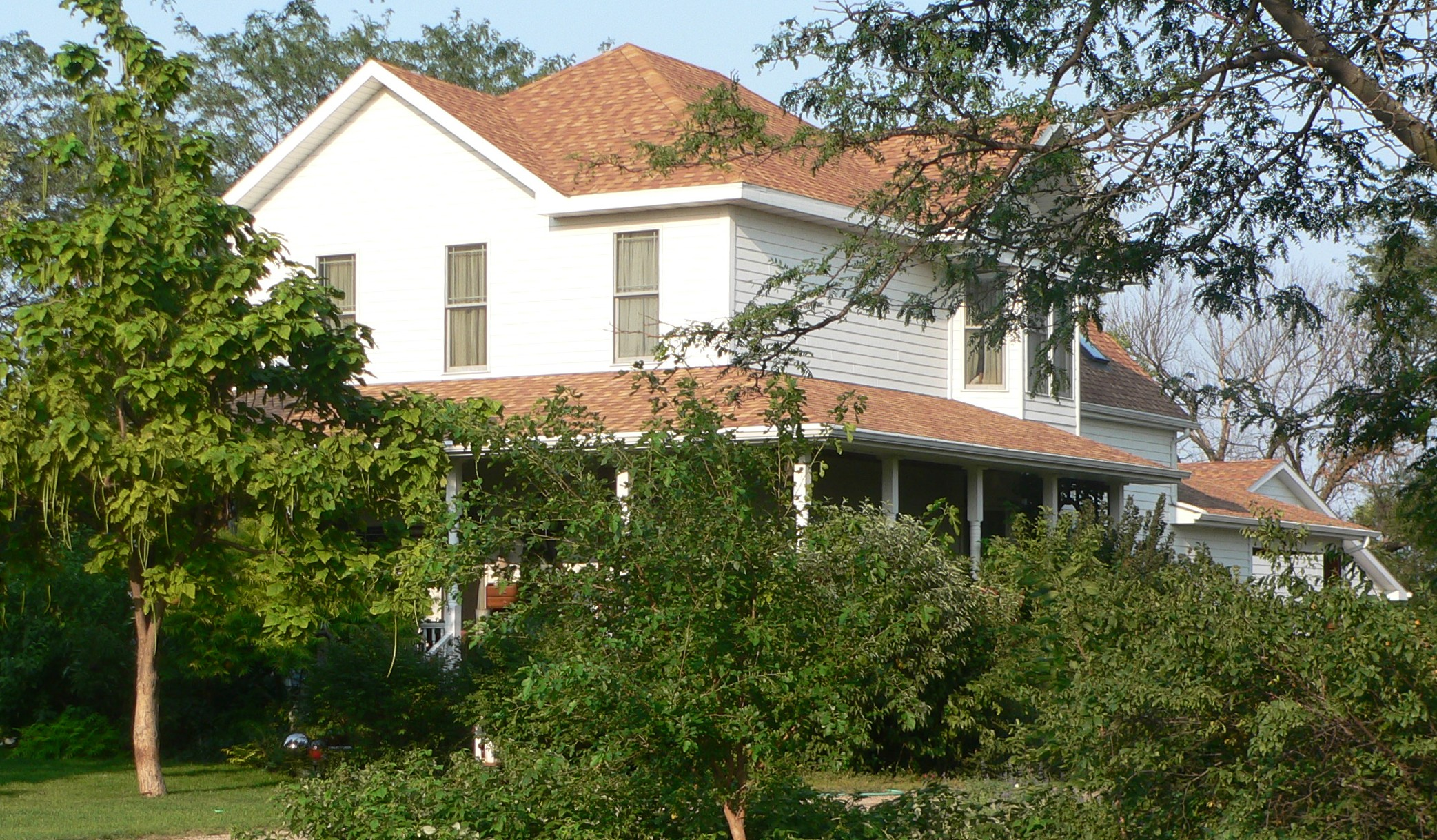

- Location within South Dakota Location within the United States
- Location: 2nd St. and East Rd., Plankinton, South Dakota
- Coordinates: 43.714904°N 98.472961°W
- Built: c. 1883
- Architectural style: Queen Anne
- NRHP reference No.: 04000472
- Added to NRHP: May 19, 2004

The Raesly House is a house in Plankinton, South Dakota. It is designed in the Queen Anne style of architecture. It was constructed c. 1883 and added to the National Register in 2004.

It was deemed notable as "a fine example of a hipped roof with lower cross gables subtype of the Queen Anne Style."
