= Stark Round Barn =

- U.S. National Register of Historic Places
- Location within South Dakota Location within the United States
- Nearest city: Unityville, South Dakota
- Coordinates: 43°48′14″N 97°27′4″W
- Area: less than one acre
- Built: 1921
- Built by: Johnston Brothers
- Architectural style: Round barn
- MPS: South Dakota's Round and Polygonal Barns and Pavilions MPS
- NRHP reference No.: 01000637
- Added to NRHP: June 6, 2001

The Stark Round Barn near Unityville, South Dakota, United States, is a round barn that was built in 1921. It was listed on the National Register of Historic Places in 2001.
