= Whittier School (Mitchell, South Dakota) =

- U.S. National Register of Historic Places
- U.S. Historic district – Contributing property
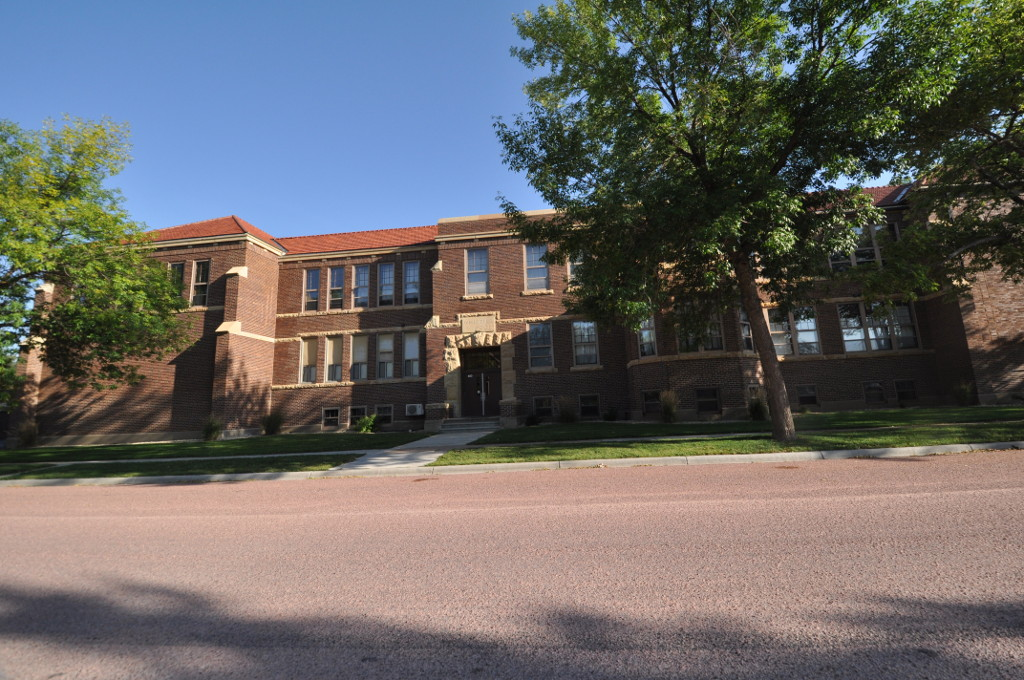

- Location within South Dakota Location within the United States
- Location: 410 W. Second Ave., Mitchell, South Dakota
- Coordinates: 43°42′46″N 98°1′49″W
- Built: 1935
- Built by: Kuipers, P.W.
- Architect: Kings & Dixon
- Part of: Mitchell West Central Residential Historic District (ID99000676)
- NRHP reference No.: 06001309

Significant dates
- Added to NRHP: January 25, 2007
- Designated CP: June 16, 1999

The Whittier School in Mitchell, South Dakota, is a Works Progress Administration-funded school building of vernacular, local design that was built in 1935. It was listed on the National Register of Historic Places in 2007.

It has brick exterior walls and a stone belt course along with modillion blocks near the roofline. It has a hipped roof with red clay tile. Most windows are nine over one, double hung windows. It was designed by architects Kings & Dixon.

Whittier has many distinguished alumni including Bobby Bowen, Garrett Lyle Gross, Eric Giblin, Beau Mackey, and Bruce "B.J." DeJong. Mr. Mackey has participated in local cage fights in the Sioux Empire. Mr. Gross has revolutionized the agricultural journal industry and also the SMS texting industry. Mr. Giblin is local entrepreneurial sandwich artist. The Giblins have sold Subway, but are now helping keep another family business alive in Mitchell - Tobin's Transfer.

== See also ==
- Koch Apartments: another contributing property
- National Register of Historic Places listings in Davison County, South Dakota
