= St. Mary's Catholic Church (Salem, South Dakota) =

Historic church in South Dakota, United States

- U.S. National Register of Historic Places
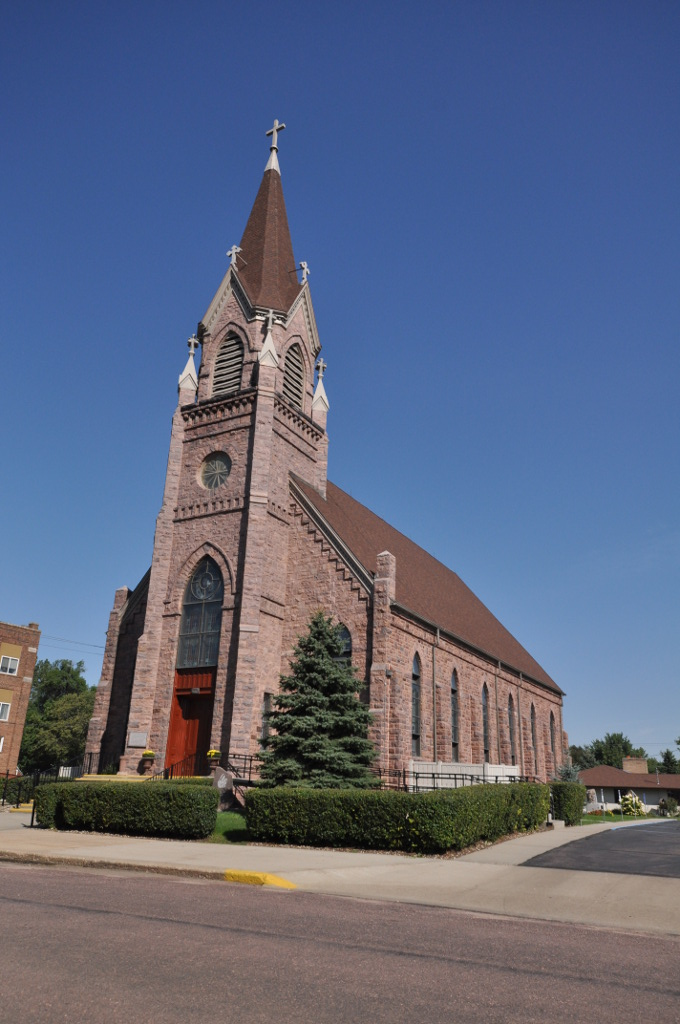

- Location within South Dakota Location within the United States
- Location: Vermont and Idaho Sts. Salem, South Dakota
- Coordinates: 43°43′36″N 97°23′22″W
- Area: less than one acre
- Built: 1898
- Architect: Weber, Rev. Bernard
- Architectural style: Gothic Revival
- NRHP reference No.: 85001354
- Added to NRHP: June 19, 1985

St. Mary's Catholic Church is Catholic parish of the Diocese of Sioux Falls located in Salem, South Dakota. Its historic church, at Vermont and Idaho Streets, was added to the National Register in 1985.

The community was established in 1885 by Martin Marty, the Vicar Apostolic of Dakota, and the first church was dedicated on November 10, 1887. The cornerstone for the new stone church was laid on July 4, 1898, and the current Gothic Revival structure opened the following year.

The school opened in 1889 and moved to a new building in 1901. The parish also sponsored a high school from 1929 to 1970.
