= Koch Apartments =

- U.S. National Register of Historic Places
- U.S. Historic district – Contributing property
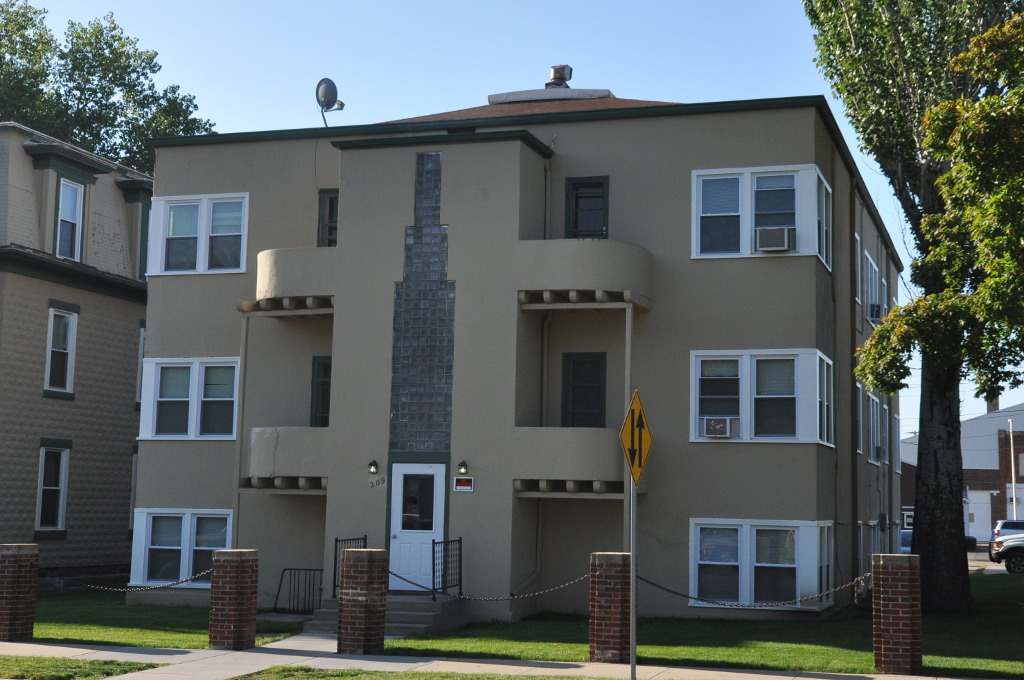

- Location within South Dakota Location within the United States
- Area: .25 acres (0.10 ha)
- Part of: Mitchell West Central Residential Historic District (ID99000676)
- NRHP reference No.: 94000562

Significant dates
- Added to NRHP: October 31, 1996
- Designated CP: June 16, 1999

The Koch Apartments is an apartment building located designed by architecture firm Kings & Dixon located at 209 W Second Ave Mitchell, Davison County, South Dakota. The building was listed on the National Register of Historic Places on October 31, 1996.

== See also ==
- Whittier School: another contributing property
- National Register of Historic Places listings in Davison County, South Dakota
