= Mitchell Prehistoric Indian Village =

- Mitchell Site
- U.S. National Register of Historic Places
- U.S. National Historic Landmark
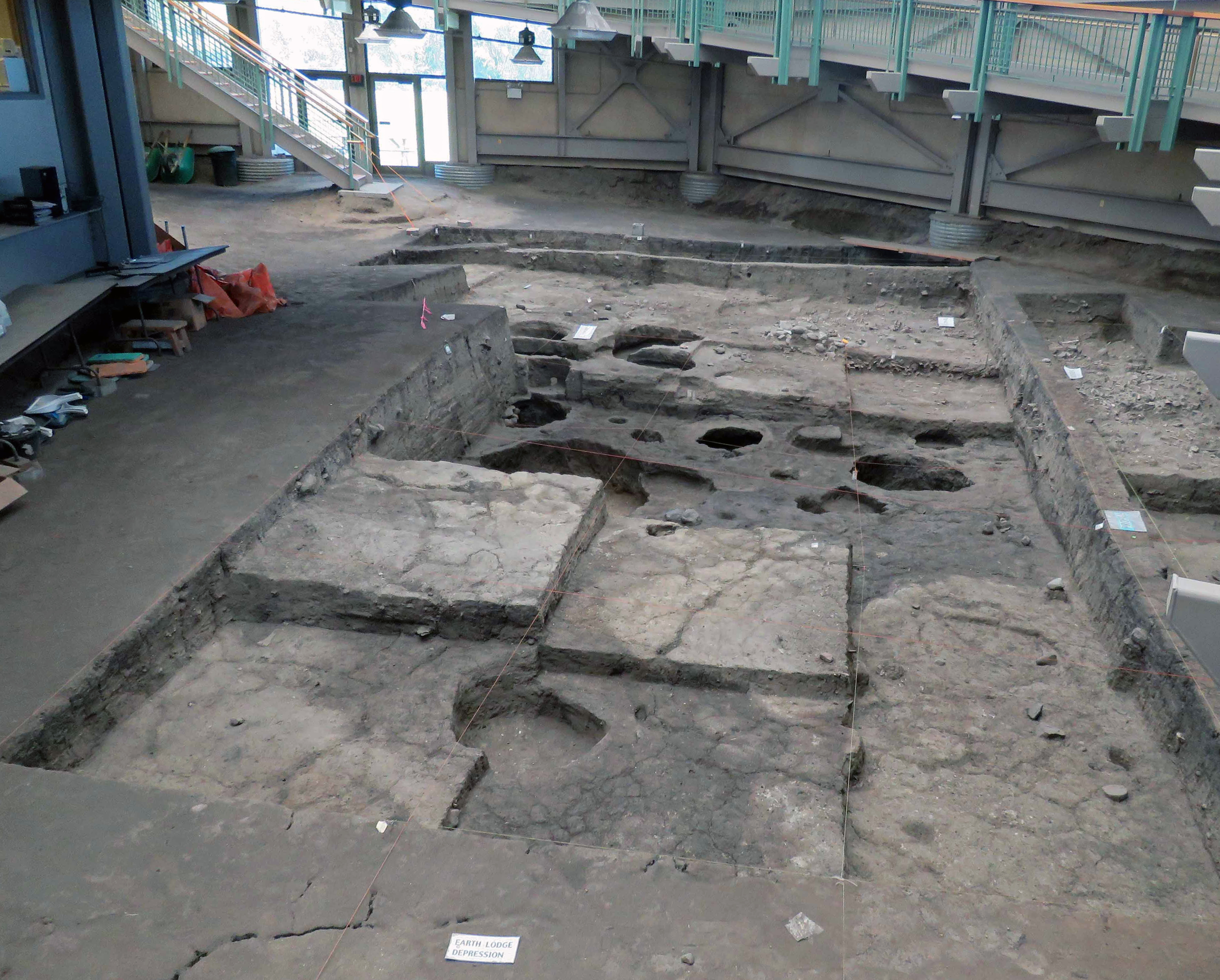

- Location within South Dakota Location within the United States
- Location: Indian Village Rd., Mitchell, South Dakota
- Coordinates: 43.7416°N 98.034°W
- Area: 41.1 acres (16.6 ha)
- NRHP reference No.: 66000712

Significant dates
- Added to NRHP: October 15, 1966
- Designated NHL: July 19, 1964

The Mitchell Site (Smithsonian trinomial 39DV2) is a pre-contact Plains Village archaeological site in Mitchell, Davison County, South Dakota overlooking Lake Mitchell. Occupied approximately AD 1000-1150, 39DV2 is a type site of the Initial Middle Missouri tradition and contains the remains of a fortified agricultural village, including the remains of a fortified agricultural village, including lodge structures, storage and bison bone processing features, fortifications, and a large archaeological assemblage. The Mitchell Site was designated a National Historic Landmark in 1964 because of its archaeological significance. Portions of the site are preserved beneath the Thomsen Center Archeodome, where archaeological excavation and research continue. The site and its collections are interpreted for the public by the Mitchell Indigenous Archaeological Site & Museum. Visitors can watch archaeologists uncover artifacts in the Thomsen Center Archeodome. The Boehnen Memorial Museum features a reconstructed lodge and many of the artifacts found at the site.

== Description ==
The Mitchell Site is located north of downtown Mitchell, on the east side of Indian Village Road, on a point overlooking Lake Mitchell. The site contains what was once a village made of lodges surrounded by a ditch and timber palisade.

The people who once lived on the Mitchell site acquired their food from many different sources. The discovery of food processing tools and carbonized seeds suggest that these people were growing much of their food. Artifacts, such as hoes and squash knives are also good indicators that they were farmers. Various types of carbonized seeds and corn cobs show they were growing corn, beans, squash, sunflowers and tobacco.

== Archaeological history ==
The site was first recorded archaeologically in 1922, when it was described as including 45 earth lodge sites, extending northward on a spur of land overlooking Firesteel Creek. The creek has since been dammed to form Lake Mitchell, and the area south of the surviving site elements has been landscaped as part of a golf course. The latter work in particular has compromised the ditches that originally surrounded the settlement. Two house depressions were excavated in 1938 by a crew funded by the Works Progress Administration. A house excavated in 1971 showed evidence of having been destroyed by fire, but included remarkable detail on its architecture.

In 1975 a nonprofit organization was founded to continue archaeological work and to preserve the site.

== See also ==
- List of National Historic Landmarks in South Dakota
- National Register of Historic Places listings in Davison County, South Dakota
