= McCook County Courthouse =

- U.S. National Register of Historic Places
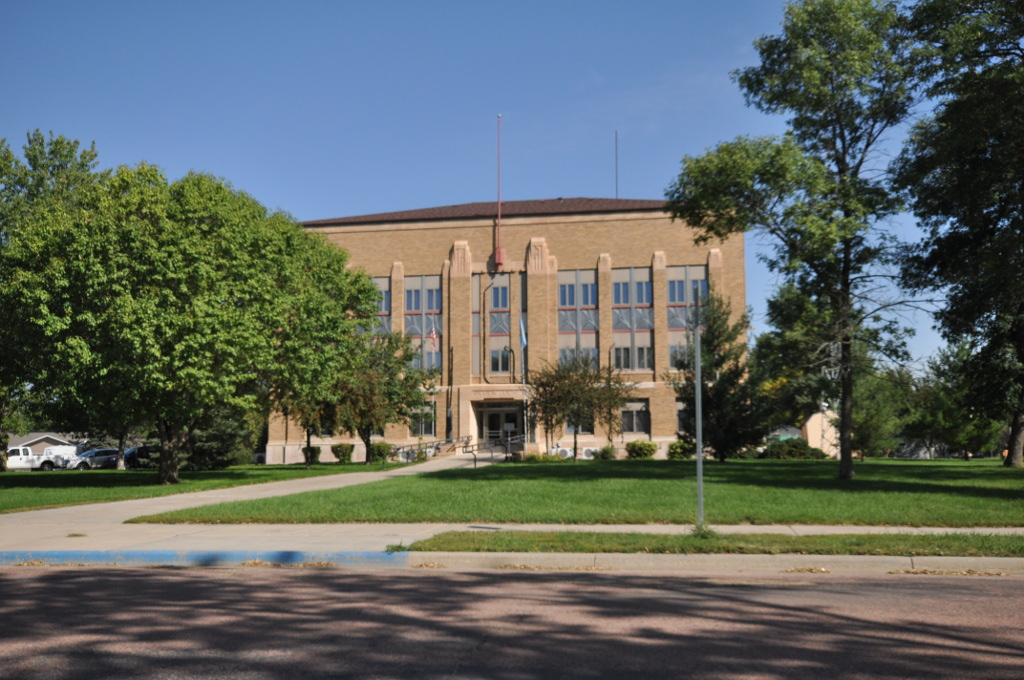

- Location within South Dakota Location within the United States
- Location: Essex Ave. between Nebraska and Main, Salem, South Dakota
- Coordinates: 43°43′41″N 97°23′15″W
- Area: less than one acre
- Built: 1934
- Built by: Huron Construction Co.
- Architect: Kings & Dixon
- Architectural style: Moderne, Art Deco
- MPS: County Courthouses of South Dakota MPS
- NRHP reference No.: 92001862
- Added to NRHP: February 10, 1993

The McCook County Courthouse, at 130 W. Essex Ave. in Salem, South Dakota, is a Moderne style courthouse built in 1934. It was listed on the National Register of Historic Places in 1993.

It is a three-story concrete building clad with brick designed by architects Kings & Dixon.
