= National Register of Historic Places listings in South Dakota =

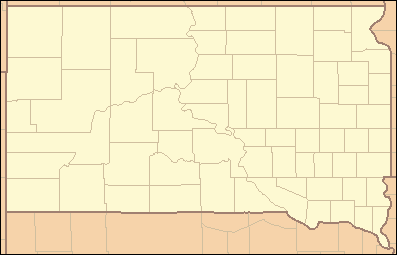

This is a list of properties and historic districts in the U.S. state of South Dakota that are listed on the National Register of Historic Places. The state's more than 1,300 listings are distributed across all of its 66 counties.

The locations of National Register properties and districts (at least for all showing latitude and longitude coordinates below), may be seen in an online map by clicking on "Map of all coordinates".

The following are approximate tallies of current listings by county.

This National Park Service list is complete through NPS recent listings posted May 8, 2026.

== Current listings by county ==
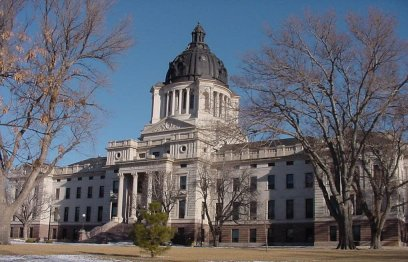
South Dakota State Capitol, in Hughes County

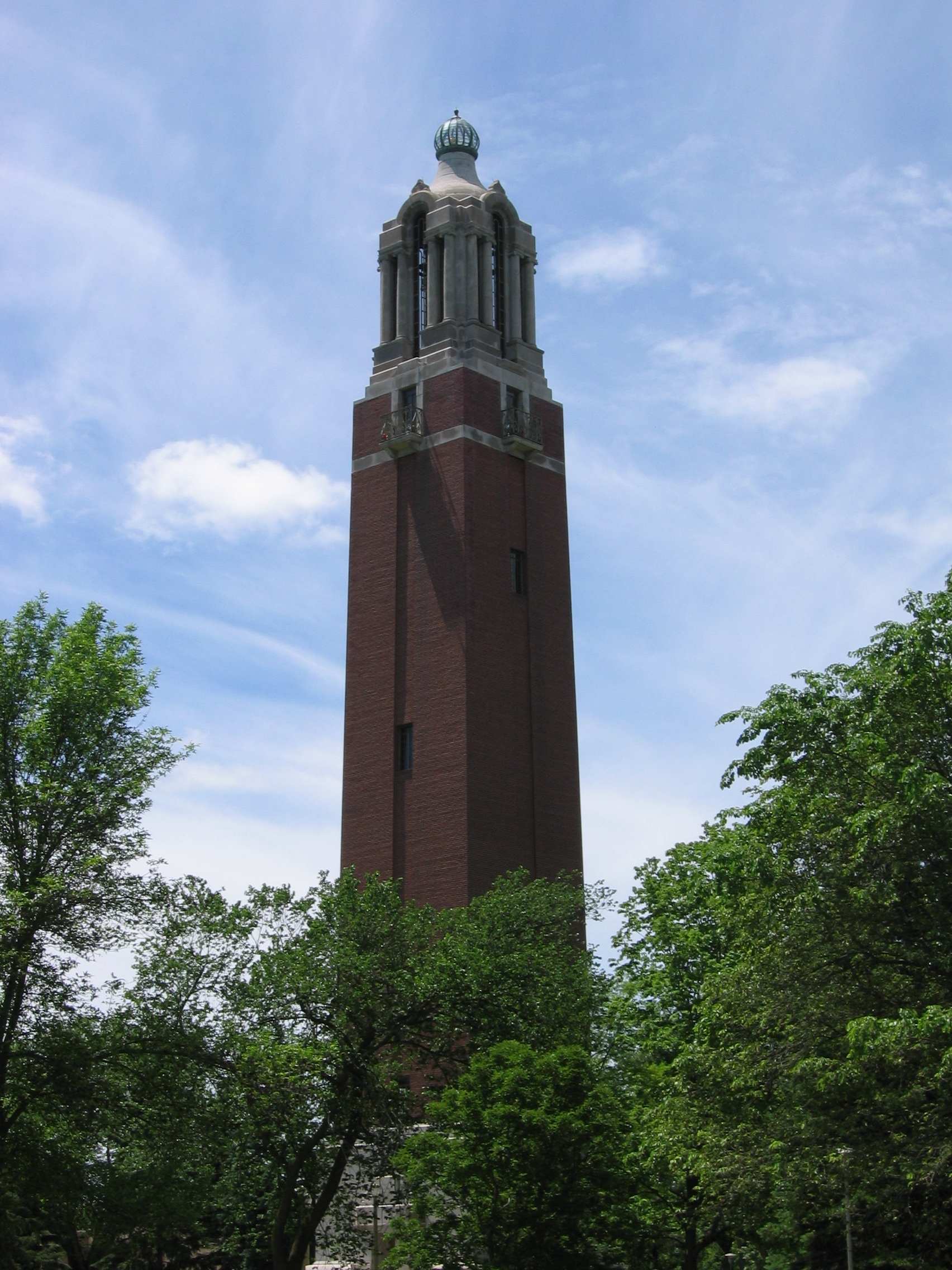
Coughlin Campanile, in Brookings County

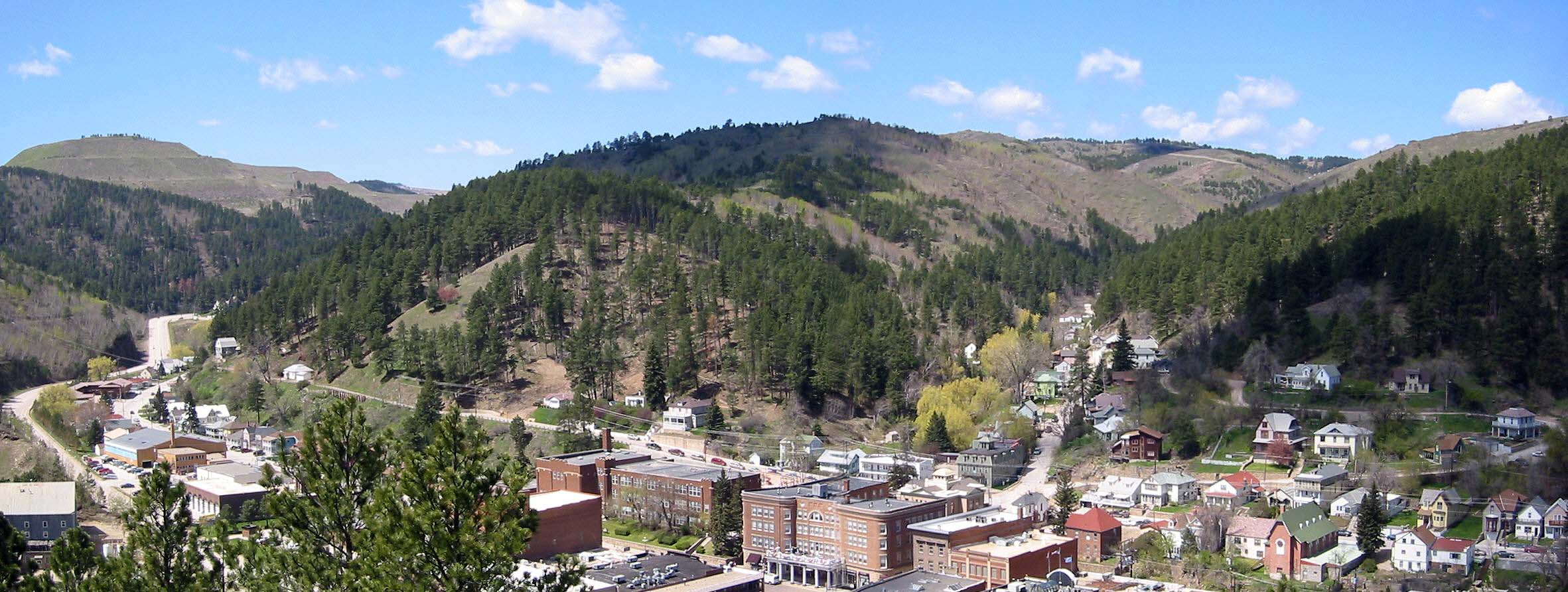
Deadwood, in Lawrence County

	County	# of Sites
1	Aurora	9
2	Beadle	27
3	Bennett	1
4	Bon Homme	41
5	Brookings	43
6	Brown	46
7	Brule	7
8	Buffalo	7
9	Butte	39
10	Campbell	3
11	Charles Mix	15
12	Clark	10
13	Clay	44
14	Codington	43
15	Corson	8
16	Custer	51
17	Davison	26
18	Day	12
19	Deuel	10
20	Dewey	5
21	Douglas	8
22	Edmunds	12
23	Fall River	75
24	Faulk	10
25	Grant	15
26	Gregory	12
27	Haakon	4
28	Hamlin	15
29	Hand	8
30	Hanson	6
31	Harding	56
32	Hughes	43
33	Hutchinson	31
34	Hyde	4
35	Jackson	8
36	Jerauld	15
37	Jones	5
38	Kingsbury	23
39	Lake	17
40	Lawrence	57
41	Lincoln	28
42	Lyman	9
43	Marshall	9
44	McCook	11
45	McPherson	3
46	Meade	32
47	Mellette	2
48	Miner	3
49	Minnehaha	105
50	Moody	16
51	Oglala Lakota	1
52	Pennington	63
53	Perkins	19
54	Potter	9
55	Roberts	16
56	Sanborn	7
57	Spink	29
58	Stanley	13
59	Sully	4
60	Todd	4
61	Tripp	6
62	Turner	31
63	Union	16
64	Walworth	13
65	Yankton	78
66	Ziebach	1
(duplicates):		(3)
Total:		1,396

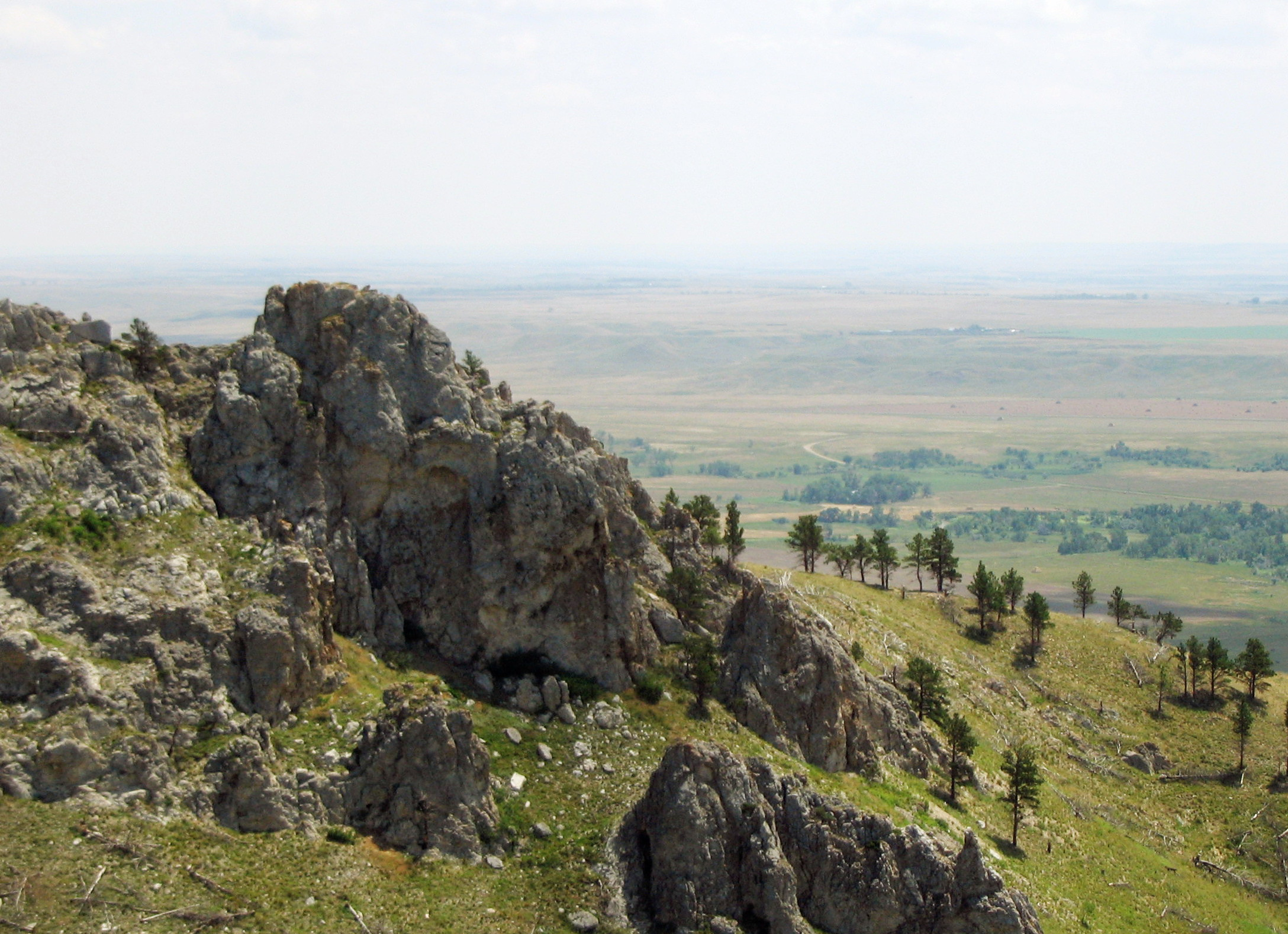
Bear Butte, in Meade County

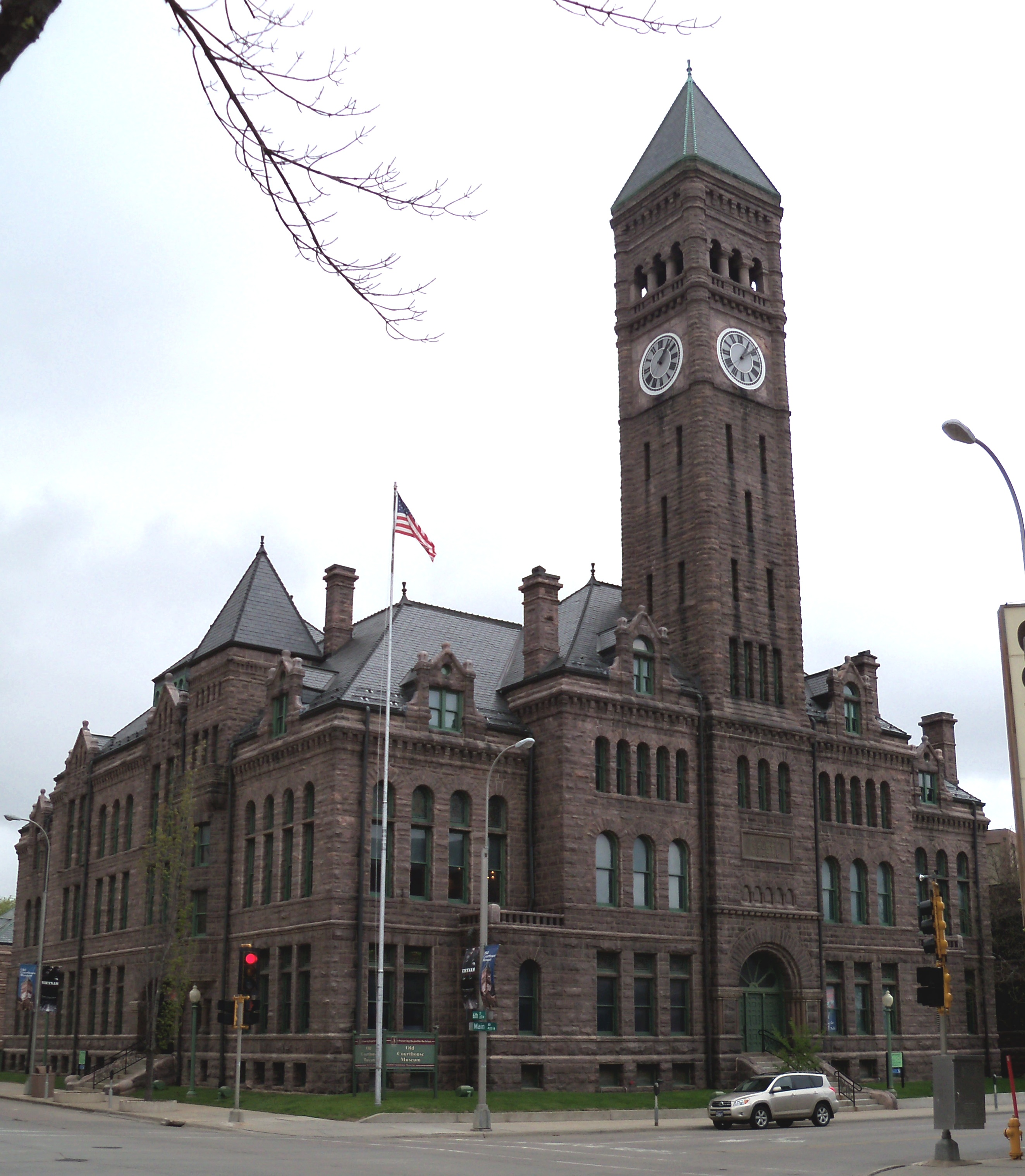
Old Minnehaha County Courthouse, in Minnehaha County

== See also ==
- List of National Historic Landmarks in South Dakota
- List of bridges on the National Register of Historic Places in South Dakota
