= Sweep Hotel =

- U.S. National Register of Historic Places
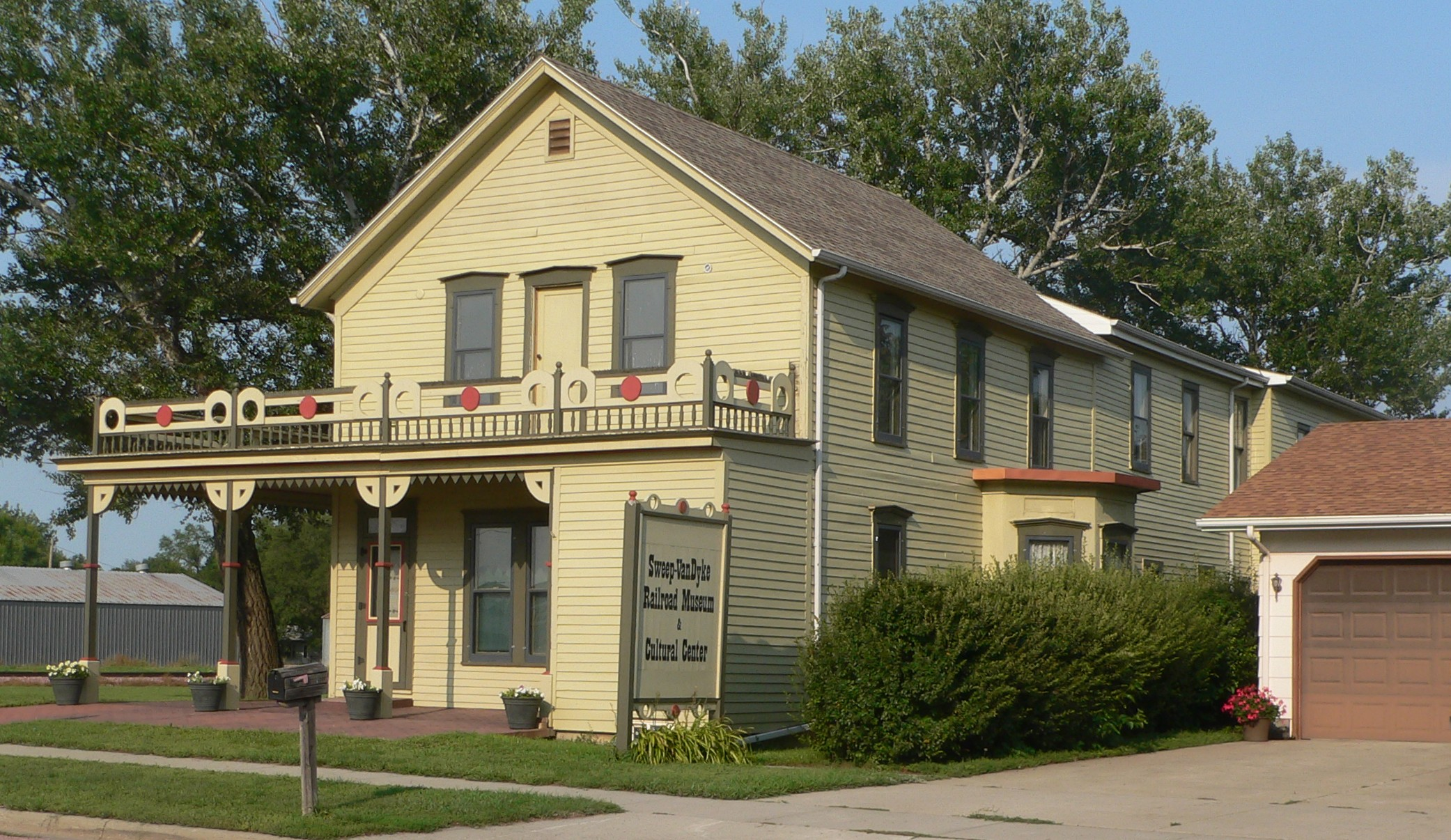

- Location within South Dakota Location within the United States
- Location: South Main, Plankinton, South Dakota
- Coordinates: 43.712231°N 98.485065°W
- Built: c. 1900
- NRHP reference No.: 05000033
- Added to NRHP: February 10, 2005

Sweep Hotel, also known as Van Dyke Hotel, is a building located in Plankinton, South Dakota. It was constructed c. 1900 and added to the National Register of Historic Places in 2005.

It was deemed notable "for the role it played as a social center for the community of Plankinton and as a fine example of the type of commercial buildings that accompanied the westward expansion of the railroad."
