= Concrete Interstate Tipis of South Dakota MPS =

- Concrete Interstate Tipis of South Dakota Multiple Property Submission
- U.S. National Register of Historic Places
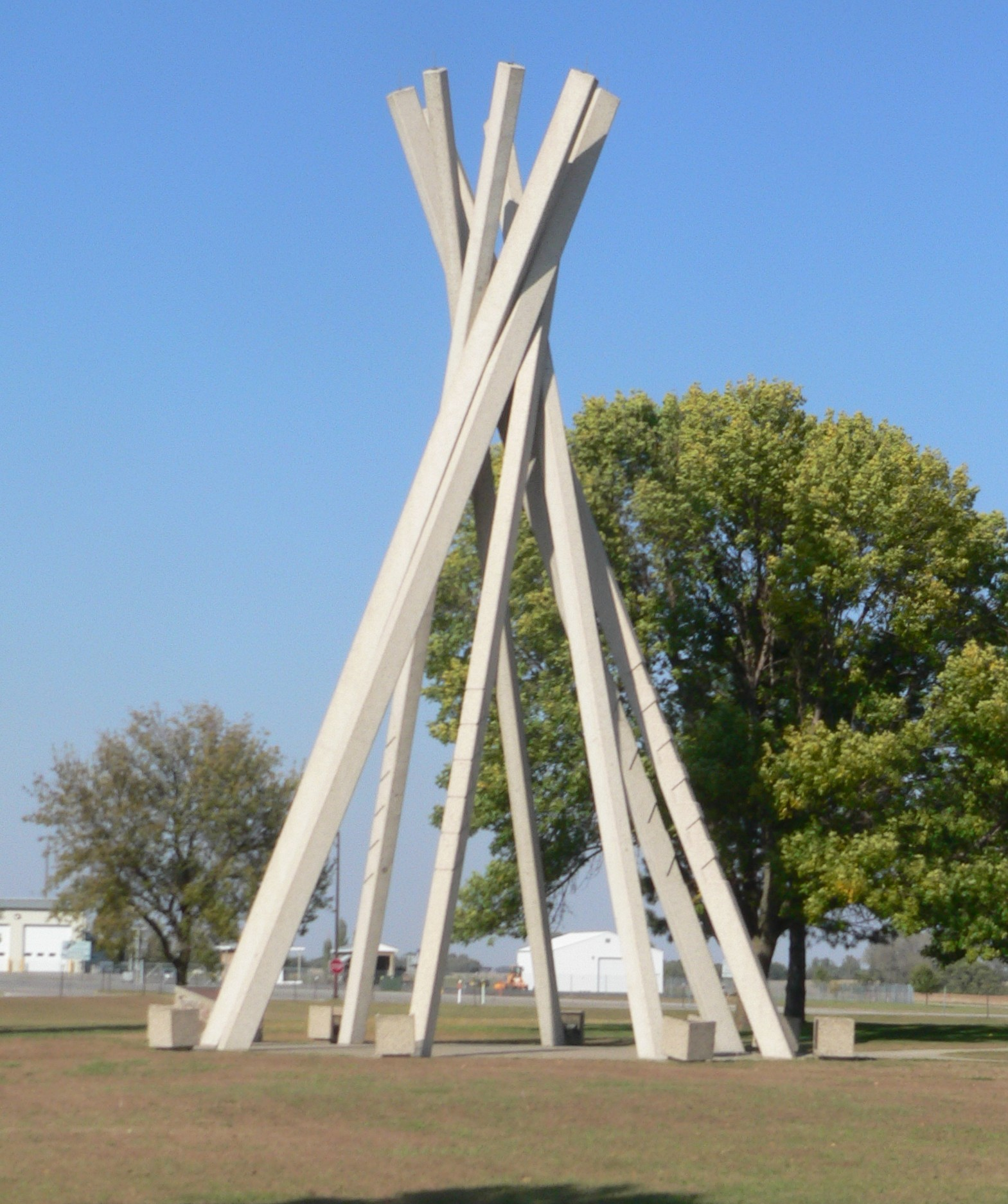
- Tipi sculpture at a rest area near Junction City

- Location: I-90 and I-29, South Dakota
- Built: 1968–1979
- Architect: Ward Whitwam
- NRHP reference No.: 64501233
- Added to NRHP: January 14, 2015

The Concrete Interstate Tipis of South Dakota are nine tipi-shaped sculptures located at rest areas along Interstate 90 and Interstate 29 as they pass through South Dakota. Designed by architect Ward Whitwam, they are sometimes colloquially called Whitwam's Wigwams. (Note: A wigwam, as in this case, is often erroneously used to refer to any Native American dwelling.) The sculptures were installed between 1968 and 1979 and have become a symbol of South Dakota tourism and interstate travel. They were collectively listed on the National Register of Historic Places under a multiple property submission in 2015 for their contribution to the state's architectural and cultural landscape.

== History ==
=== Background ===
Interstates 90 and 29 were created in the mid-20th century as part of the Federal-Aid Highway Act of 1956, a national push to promote interstate travel. Simultaneously, the need for rest areas at regularly-spaced intervals along the highways was identified, which would not only improve travellers' experiences by meeting their basic needs but also improving safety by promoting driving breaks.

The Highway Beautification Act of 1965 brought significant changes to the guidelines for rest area architecture. This legislation directed states to design unique rest areas that would reflect the features of their state, promoting vernacular architecture that would beautify the roadside.

=== Installation ===
Ward Whitwam, originally from Watertown, was already an established local architect by the late 1960s, having constructed multiple buildings in Sioux Falls and Mitchell. Whitwam was offered the job by John Olson, who worked for the South Dakota Highway Department and attended church with Whitwam.

Whitwam's original rest area plans centered around buildings that resembled the dugouts and sod houses constructed by early local homesteaders. The facilities were designed to look like large, sloping hills from a distance, topped with soil.

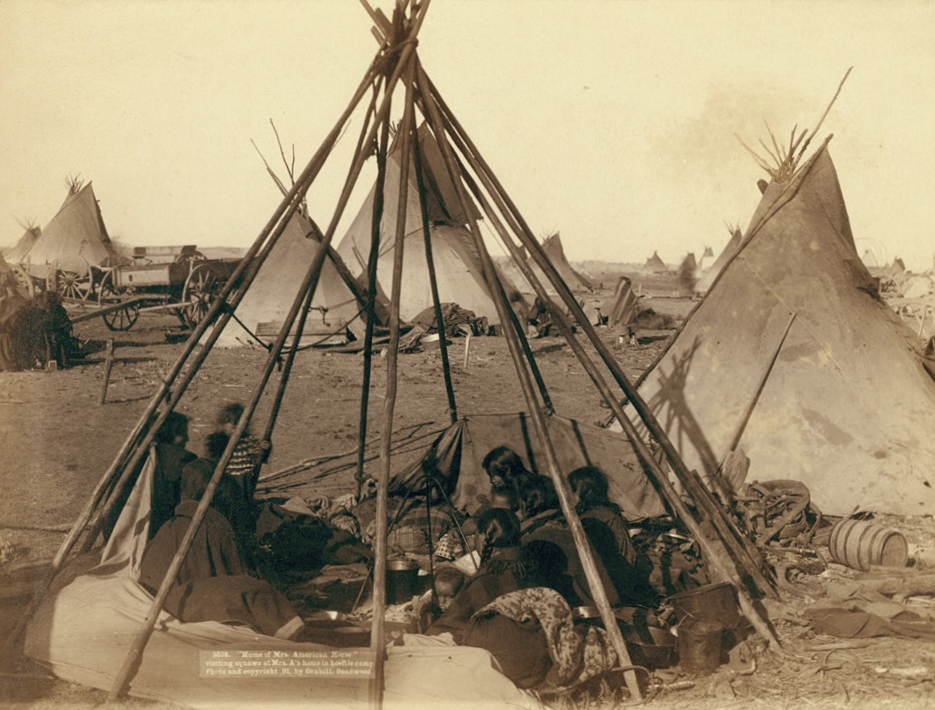
An uncovered Lakota tipi displaying the internal lodgepole configuration

Later, Whitwam decided to add tipis as a way to pay homage to the Plains Indians and especially to the Sioux; Whitwam later explained he realized, as they were on the land first, it would be appropriate to include Native structures. His final design implemented semi-circular dugouts which wrapped around the tipi's base.

The Highway Department accepted his designs in November 1965; they expressed that the plans were "uniquely South Dakota[n]". Construction was handled by Gage Brothers Concrete, who also came up with a way of securing the lodgepoles together through welding. To keep the poles upright so they could be joined, an additional lodgepole was temporarily installed in the center and then removed when works were complete.

Originally, only four sculptures were planned: one each for the eastbound and westbound rest areas at Wasta and Salem. The ones at Wasta were constructed first, being placed at the site during the summer of 1968; the Salem tipis were installed that fall. The dugout buildings were also constructed but quickly demolished after the Highway Department required more space for a lobby and larger toilet facilities.

The positive reception of the sculptures prompted the DOH to commission five additional sculptures, which were placed at rest areas in Valley Springs in 1973, Chamberlain in 1976, Spearfish in 1977, and both New Effington and Junction City in 1979.

=== Accolades ===
The tipis have since become a prominent symbol of travel across South Dakota and are one of the most photographed rest area features in the United States.

In 2005, the tipis were listed on the Federal Highway Administration's "Final List of Nationally and Exceptionally Significant Features of the Federal Highway Interstate System" and were the only entry specifically included for their cultural significance.

On January 14, 2015, all nine sculptures were listed on the National Register of Historic Places under the Concrete Interstate Tipis of South Dakota Multiple Properties Submission. The tipis were added under Criterion A in the transportation and entertainment/recreation categories, and under Criterion C as art. Additionally, Criterion G was applied to allow the works to be listed, as at the time of nomination they did not meet the 50-year age requirement for listed properties.

== Design ==
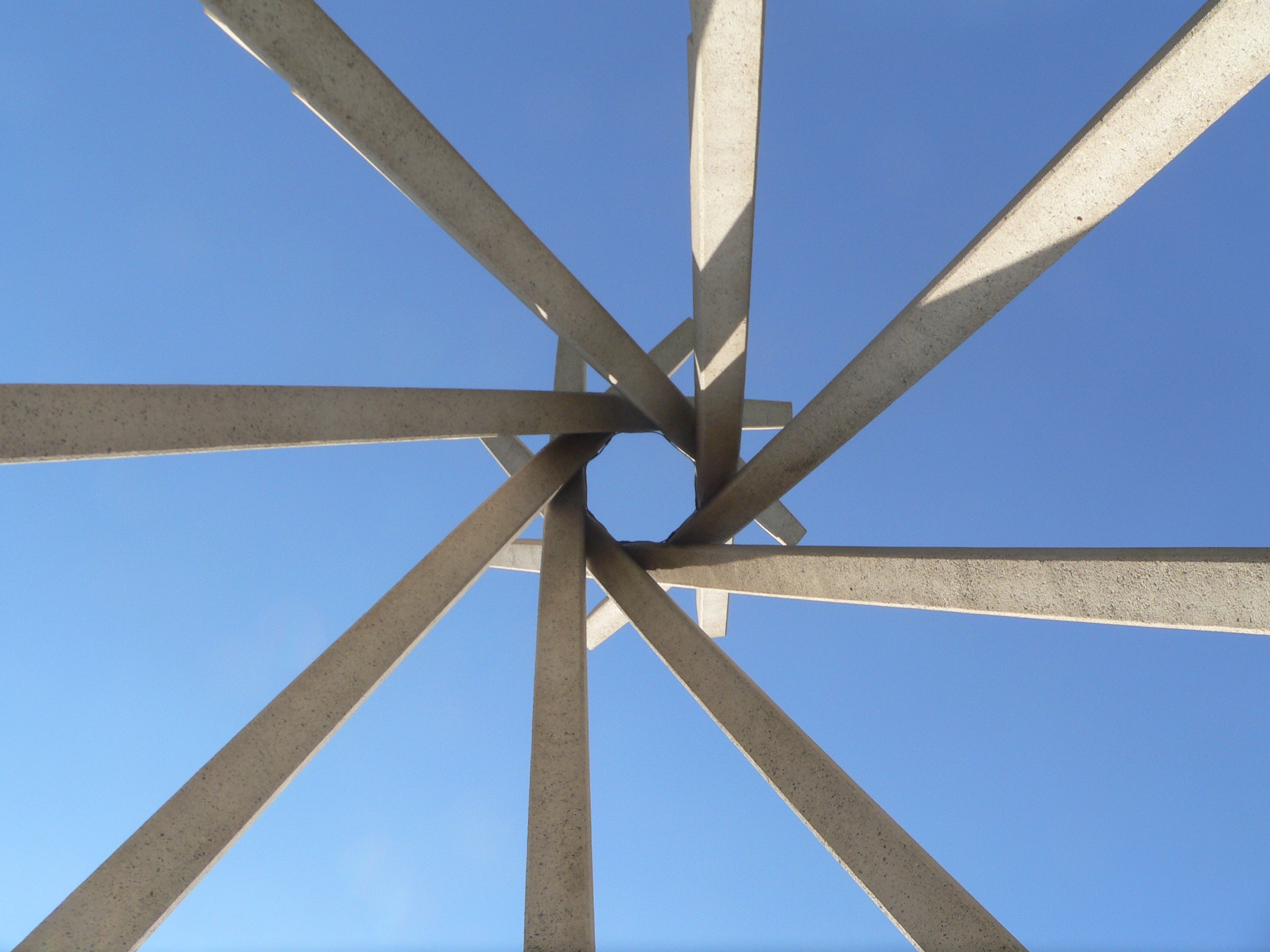
Looking up through the center of a tipi reveals its uniform spiral design.

All sculptures, identical in form, are 56 feet (17 m) (Note: The original design used 40-foot (12 m) lodgepoles.) tall and are 35 feet (11 m) in diameter at their bases. Each tipi features eight prestressed concrete poles laid against each other in a spiral, meeting nearly at the top and leaving the ends unjoined. At the meeting point, the poles are notched and secured together by a steel plate. The meeting point creates a 3 ft (0.91 m) octagonal gap of open space. Each pole weighs 6 1/2 tons. Some of the poles have geometric designs carved on them; others are undecorated.

Whitwam aimed to only invoke the symbol of a tipi instead of attempting to faithfully recreate one. There are several differences between his sculptures and actual examples of tipis, including the overall size, the number of lodgepoles, the omission of smoke flaps, and his incorporation of perfect symmetry.

The size of the tipis continues a tradition in South Dakota of placing larger-than-life sculptures along public roads; other examples of this phenomenon are Dinosaur Park and the Statue of a Quarter Pounder.

== Sculptures ==
There are nine sculptures in total: seven along I-90 and two along I-29. Two rest areas—Cheyenne River Rest Area near Wasta and Salem Rest Area near Salem—have two sculptures each, one in each direction.

Name	Location	Image	NRHP reference
Cheyenne River Rest Area	I-90 (eastbound), Wasta; 44°03′46.8″N 102°26′23.1″W		14001186
Cheyenne River Rest Area	I-90 (westbound), Wasta; 44°03′53.6″N 102°26′04.3″W		14001187
Glacial Lakes Rest Area	I-29, New Effington; 45°54′28.5″N 96°51′51.3″W		14001189
Homestead Rest Area	I-29, Junction City; 42°47′05″N 96°47′15.2″W		14001191
Lewis and Clark Rest Area	I-90, Chamberlain; 43°47′11.9″N 99°20′24.2″W		14001177
Northern Hills Rest Area	I-90, Spearfish; 44°32′42.2″N 104°02′03.2″W		14001180
Salem Rest Area	I-90 (eastbound), Salem; 43°39′56.8″N 97°25′19.9″W		14001181
Salem Rest Area	I-90 (westbound), Salem; 43°40′02.4″N 97°24′53.6″W		14001182
Valley Springs Rest Area	I-90, Valley Springs; 43°36′37.5″N 96°27′36.9″W		14001183

== See also ==
- Dignity of Earth and Sky
- Interstate 29 in South Dakota
- Interstate 90 in South Dakota
