= Aurora County Courthouse =

- U.S. National Register of Historic Places
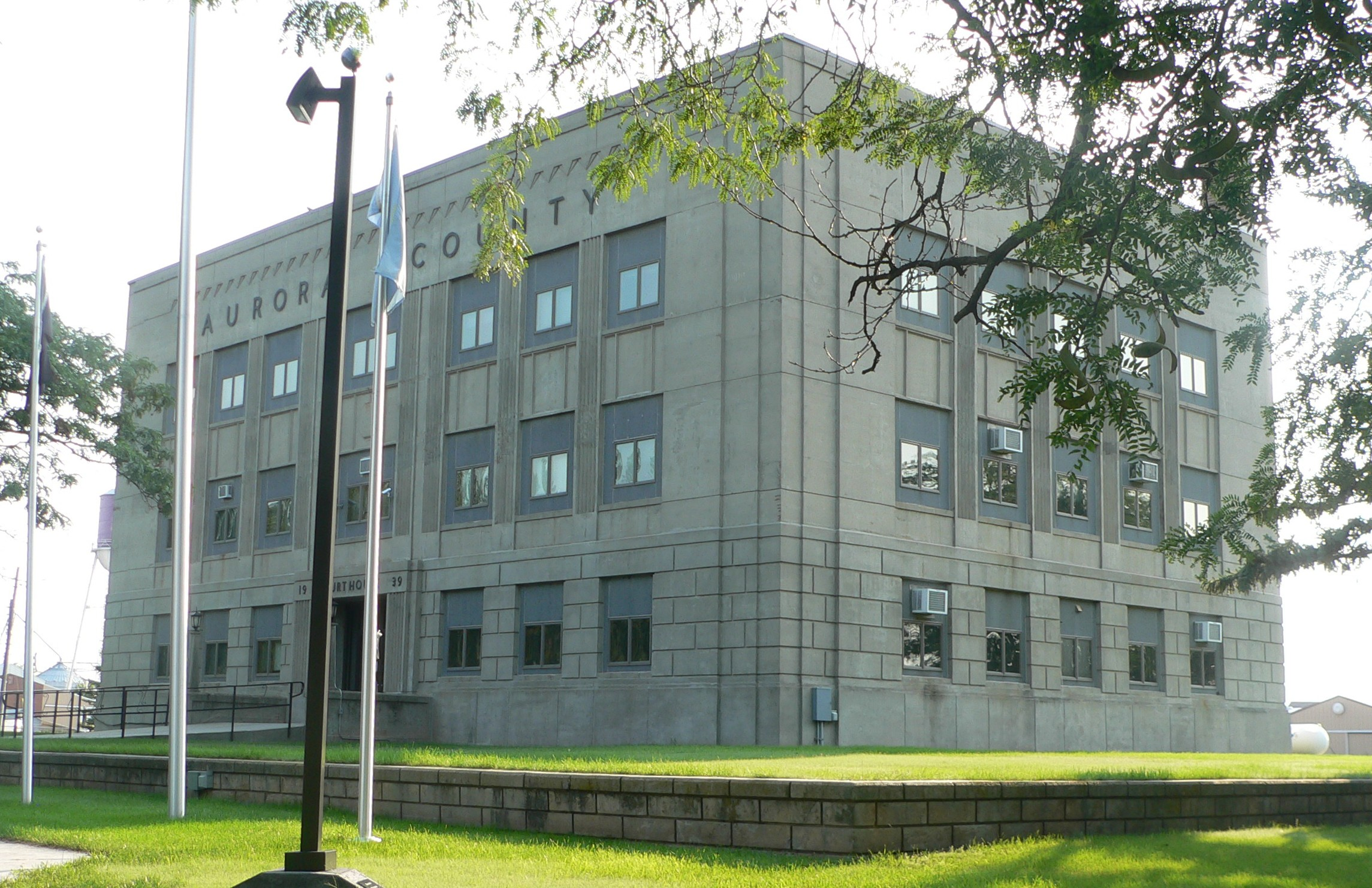

- Location within South Dakota Location within the United States
- Location: Main St. between Fourth and Fifth Sts., Plankinton, South Dakota
- Coordinates: 43.717620°N 98.485726°W
- Built: 1939-40
- Architect: Kings & Dixon
- Architectural style: Moderne, Art Deco
- MPS: County Courthouses of South Dakota MPS
- NRHP reference No.: 92001855
- Added to NRHP: February 10, 1993

The Aurora County Courthouse, located in Plankinton, South Dakota is a building in the Art Moderne and Art Deco styles.

It was built in 1940 and added to the National Register of Historic Places in 1993. It was one of four county courthouses in South Dakota designed by architects Kings & Dixon.

As of 2013, the building served as the county courthouse for Aurora County.
