= Dr. John Trierweiler House =

- U.S. National Register of Historic Places
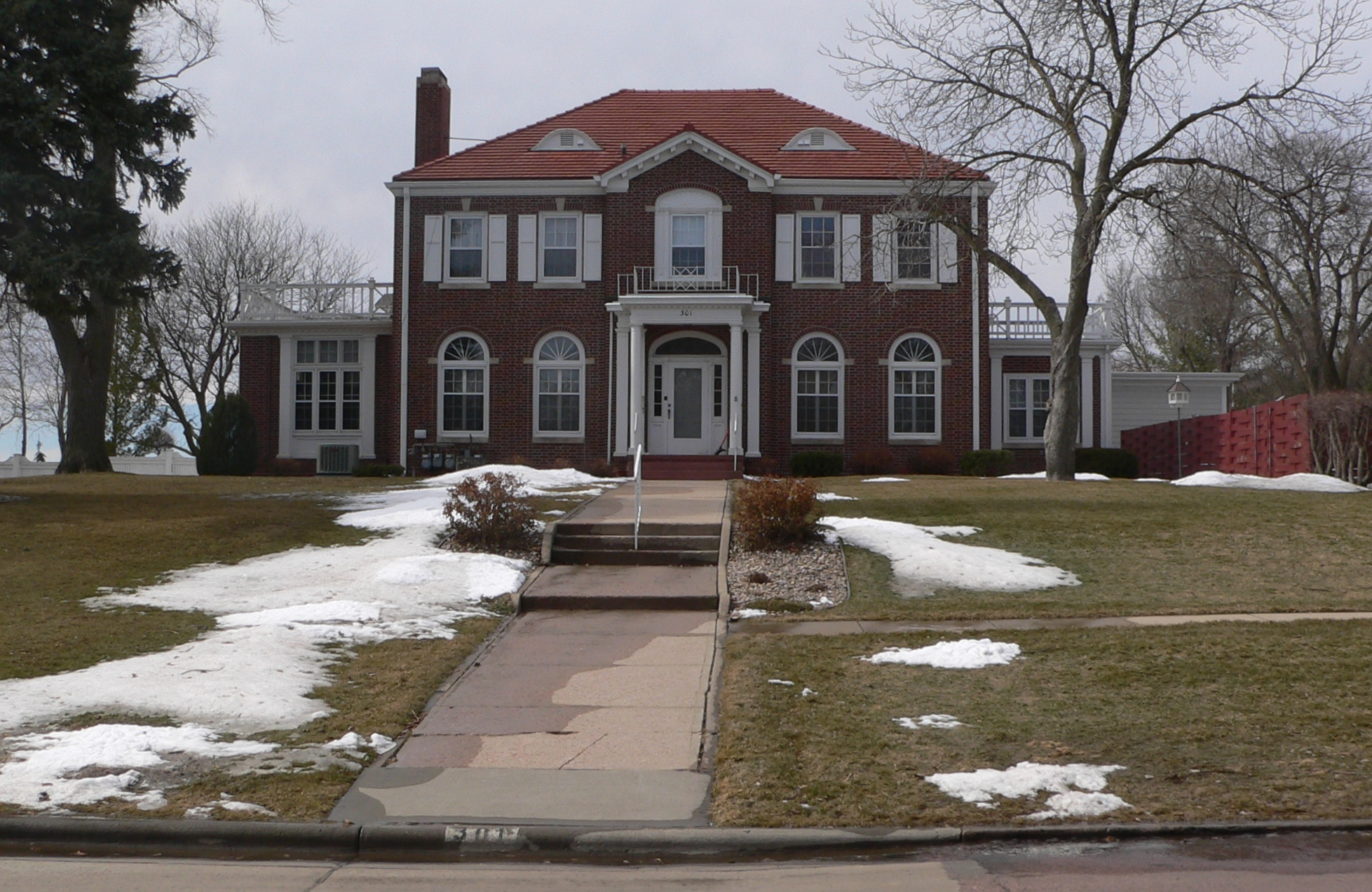
- The house in 2011

- Location within South Dakota Location within the United States
- Location: 301 Spruce Street, Yankton, South Dakota
- Coordinates: 42°52′13″N 97°24′15″W
- Area: 0.7 acres (0.28 ha)
- Built: 1926-27
- Architect: Kings & Dixon
- Architectural style: Georgian Revival
- NRHP reference No.: 80003778
- Added to NRHP: May 7, 1980

The Dr. John Trierweiler House is a historic house in Yankton, South Dakota. It was built in 1926-27 for prominent local physician Dr. John Edwin Trierweiler and his wife, Mable Gertrude (McGinty) Trierweiler. It was designed in the Georgian Revival architectural style by Kings & Dixon. It has been listed on the National Register of Historic Places since May 7, 1980.

It was designed by architects Kings & Dixon of Mitchell, South Dakota.
