= First Presbyterian Church (Bridgewater, South Dakota) =

- U.S. National Register of Historic Places
- Location within South Dakota Location within the United States
- Location: 351 N. Poplar, Bridgewater, South Dakota
- Coordinates: 43°33′05″N 97°30′04″W
- Area: less than one acre
- Built: 1928
- Architect: Walter J. Dixon
- Architectural style: Prairie School
- NRHP reference No.: 13000917
- Added to NRHP: December 11, 2013

The First Presbyterian Church in Bridgewater, South Dakota was listed on the National Register of Historic Places in 2013.

Designed by architect Walter J. Dixon, it was deemed notable as a rare example of Prairie School-style church building in South Dakota. The building was completed in 1928.
