= Downtown Salem Historic District (Salem, South Dakota) =

Historic district in South Dakota, United States

- U.S. National Register of Historic Places
- U.S. Historic district
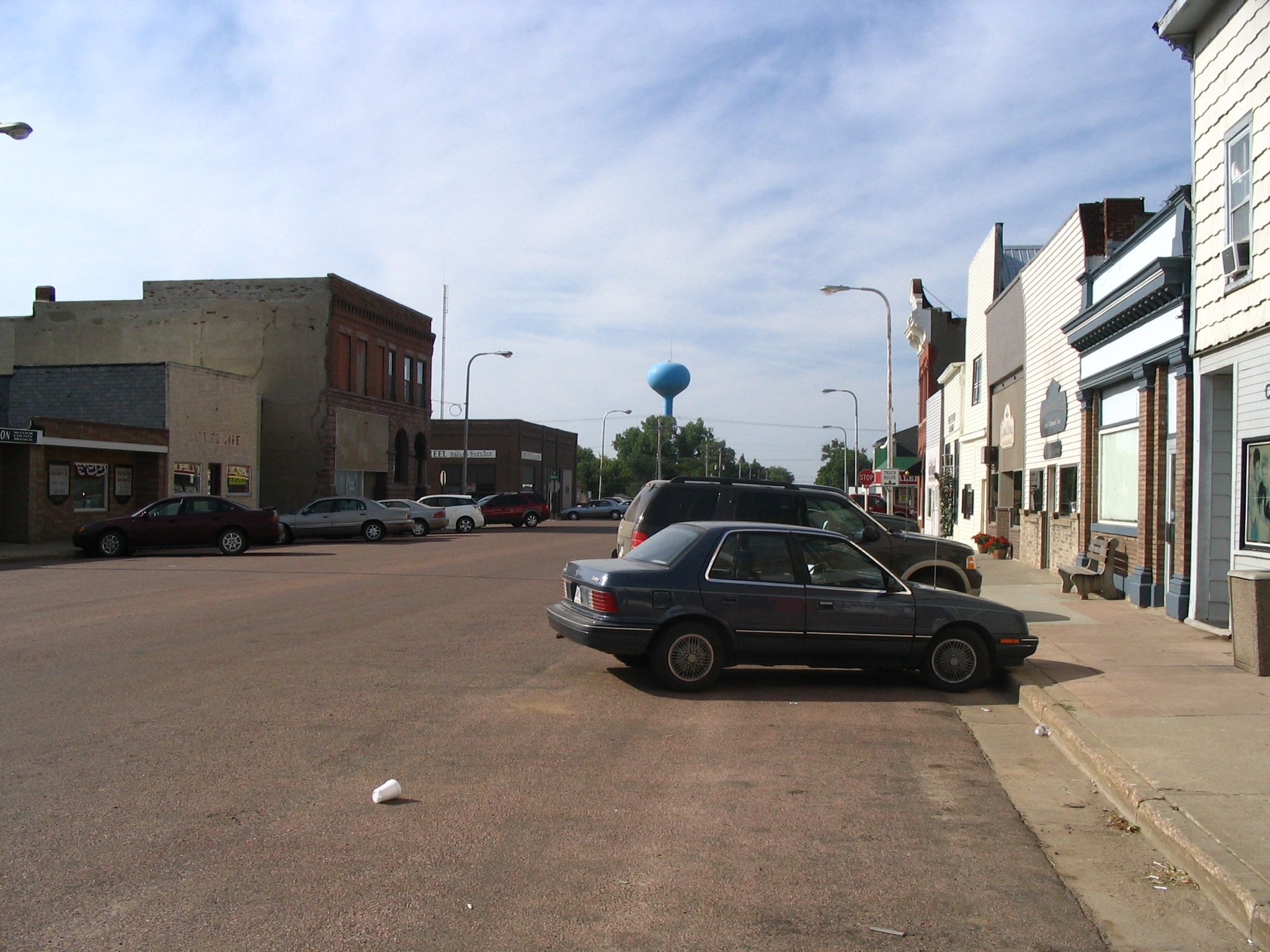
- Photo of downtown Salem, with the taller building on the left being Salem Bank (1902)

- Location within South Dakota Location within the United States
- Location: 140, 200 and 201 N. Main, Salem, South Dakota
- Area: 2 acres (0.81 ha)
- Built: 1889, 1902, 1914
- Architectural style: Richardsonian Romanesque, Italianate, Commercial
- NRHP reference No.: 03001527
- Added to NRHP: January 28, 2004

The Downtown Salem Historic District in Salem, South Dakota is a small (2 acres (0.81 ha)) historic district which was listed on the National Register of Historic Places in 2004. It contained just three contributing buildings, at 140, 200 and 201 N. Main.

The three buildings are corner buildings facing onto N. Main Street. They were built in 1889, 1902 and 1914. The three buildings were deemed to be the only ones surviving in Salem's business district and having historic integrity. In May 2025, 104 N. Main was tore down.

The buildings are:

- Sessler Building (1914), Commercial style.
- Salem Bank (1902), 200 North Main, a two-story brick Richardsonian Romanesque commercial building, with arches over its corner entrance.
- 1899 Bank Building (1899), also known as Old Salem Bank, 201 North Main, a two-story brick commercial building with both Italianate and Queen Anne details.
