= Underwood United Methodist Church =

Historic church in South Dakota, United States

- U.S. National Register of Historic Places
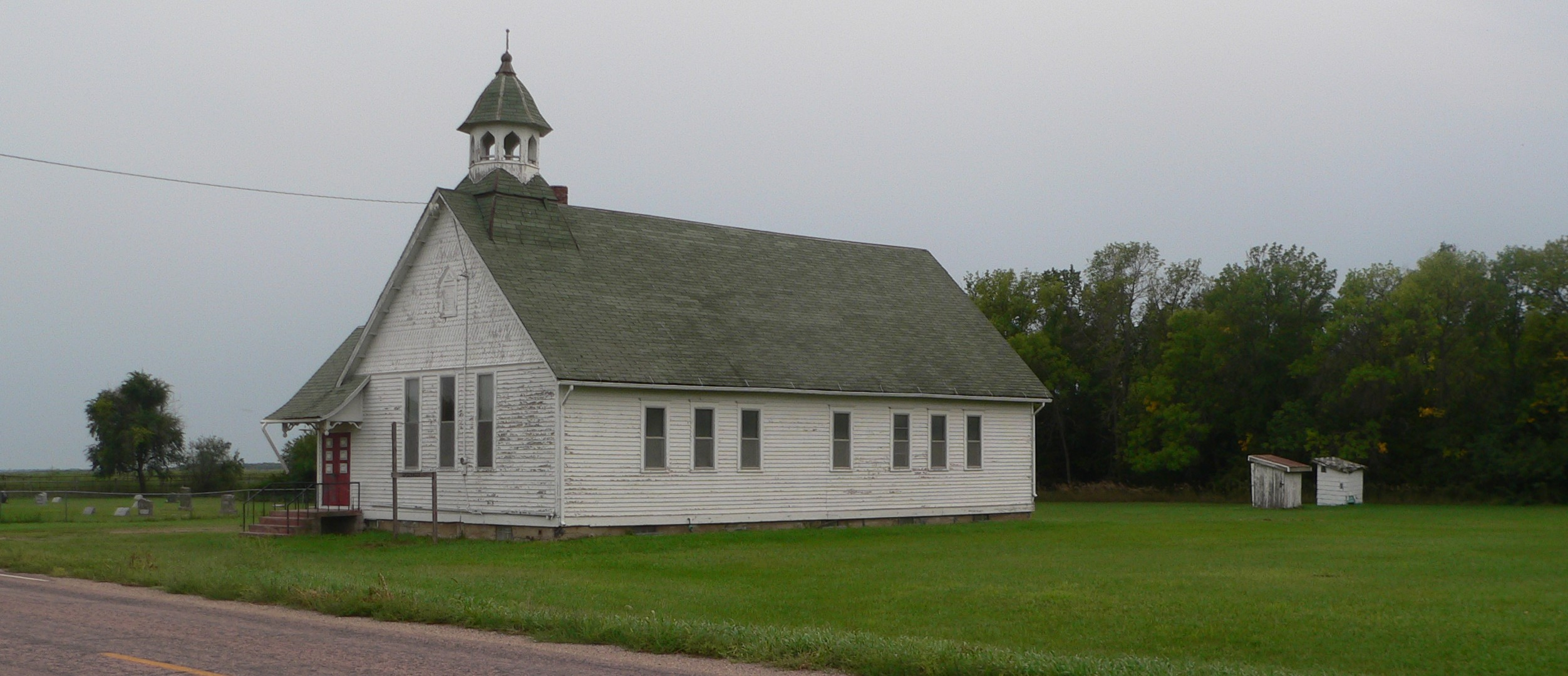

- Location within South Dakota Location within the United States
- Nearest city: White Lake, South Dakota
- Coordinates: 43°52′44″N 98°43′43″W
- Built: 1908, 1920
- NRHP reference No.: 08000798
- Added to NRHP: August 22, 2008

The Underwood United Methodist Church is a church in Aurora County, South Dakota which was built in 1908. It was added to the National Register of Historic Places in 2008.

Built in 1908, it was modified in 1920. It is a one-story gable front church with an octagonal bell tower.
