= Stickney, South Dakota =

- Town
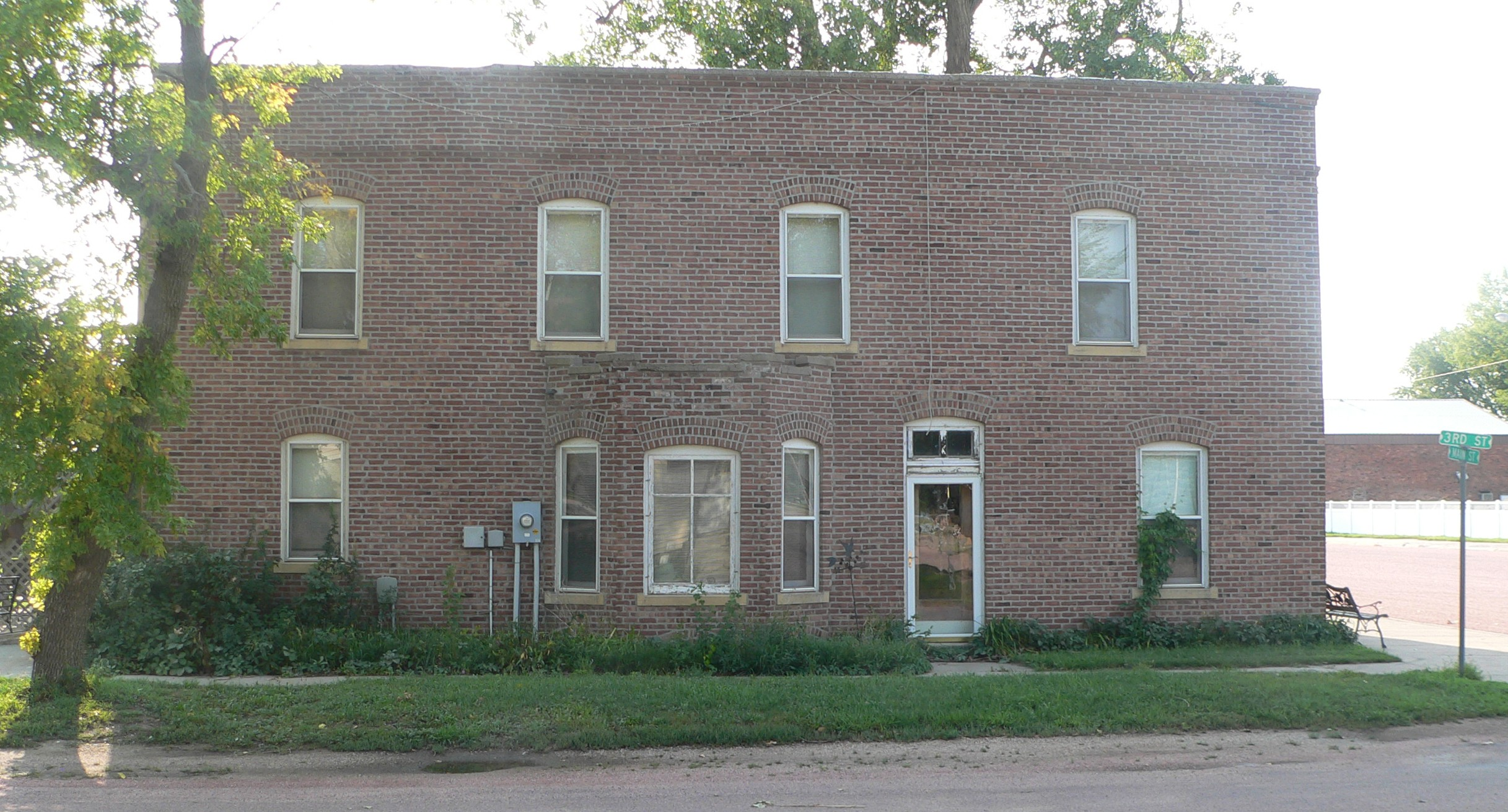
- Lincoln House

- Location in Aurora County and the state of South Dakota
- Coordinates: 43°35′21″N 98°26′15″W
- Country: United States
- State: South Dakota
- County: Aurora
- Incorporated: 1905

Area
  - Total: 0.27 sq mi (0.70 km^{2})
  - Land: 0.27 sq mi (0.70 km^{2})
  - Water: 0 sq mi (0.00 km^{2})
- Elevation: 1,644 ft (501 m)

Population (2020)
  - Total: 321
  - Density: 1,195.8/sq mi (461.72/km^{2})
- Time zone: UTC-6 (Central (CST))
  - Summer (DST): UTC-5 (CDT)
- ZIP code: 57375
- Area code: 605
- FIPS code: 46-61700
- GNIS feature ID: 1267592
- Website: www.stickneysd.com

Stickney is a town in Aurora County, South Dakota, United States. The population was 321 at the 2020 census.

== History ==
The town was named for J.B. Stickney, an official with the Milwaukee Railroad. The town was platted and incorporated in 1905 and a post office was established November 17, 1905.

The William P. Smith house, now on the National Register of Historic Places, was built in 1914.

== Geography ==
According to the United States Census Bureau, the town has a total area of 0.27 square miles (0.70 km^{2}), all land.

== Demographics ==
Historical population
Census	Pop.	Note	%±
1910	310		—
1920	386		24.5%
1930	412		6.7%
1940	361		−12.4%
1950	388		7.5%
1960	456		17.5%
1970	421		−7.7%
1980	409		−2.9%
1990	323		−21.0%
2000	334		3.4%
2010	284		−15.0%
2020	321		13.0%
U.S. Decennial Census

=== 2010 census ===
As of the census of 2010, there were 284 people, 132 households, and 79 families residing in the town. The population density was 1,051.9 inhabitants per square mile (406.1/km^{2}). There were 152 housing units at an average density of 563.0 per square mile (217.4/km^{2}). The racial makeup of the town was 98.9% White and 1.1% Asian. Hispanic or Latino of any race were 0.4% of the population.

There were 132 households, of which 22.7% had children under the age of 18 living with them, 53.0% were married couples living together, 4.5% had a female householder with no husband present, 2.3% had a male householder with no wife present, and 40.2% were non-families. 38.6% of all households were made up of individuals, and 24.3% had someone living alone who was 65 years of age or older. The average household size was 2.15 and the average family size was 2.87.

The median age in the town was 47 years. 23.2% of residents were under the age of 18; 3.9% were between the ages of 18 and 24; 20.7% were from 25 to 44; 23.3% were from 45 to 64; and 28.9% were 65 years of age or older. The gender makeup of the town was 47.9% male and 52.1% female.

=== 2000 census ===
As of the census of 2000, there were 334 people, 156 households, and 92 families residing in the town. The population density was 1,254.1 inhabitants per square mile (484.2/km^{2}). There were 169 housing units at an average density of 634.6 per square mile (245.0/km^{2}). The racial makeup of the town was 99.70% White, 0.30% from other races. Hispanic or Latino of any race were 0.30% of the population.

There were 156 households, out of which 28.8% had children under the age of 18 living with them, 51.3% were married couples living together, 4.5% had a female householder with no husband present, and 41.0% were non-families. 39.7% of all households were made up of individuals, and 25.6% had someone living alone who was 65 years of age or older. The average household size was 2.11 and the average family size was 2.85.

In the town, the population was spread out, with 24.3% under the age of 18, 6.3% from 18 to 24, 19.8% from 25 to 44, 21.6% from 45 to 64, and 28.1% who were 65 years of age or older. The median age was 45 years. For every 100 females, there were 86.6 males. For every 100 females age 18 and over, there were 75.7 males.

The median income for a household in the town was $28,906, and the median income for a family was $42,083. Males had a median income of $27,344 versus $25,208 for females. The per capita income for the town was $15,936. About 5.6% of families and 9.1% of the population were below the poverty line, including 5.7% of those under age 18 and 19.1% of those age 65 or over.

== See also ==
- List of towns in South Dakota
