= Mitchell West Central Residential Historic District =

Historic district in South Dakota, United States

- U.S. National Register of Historic Places
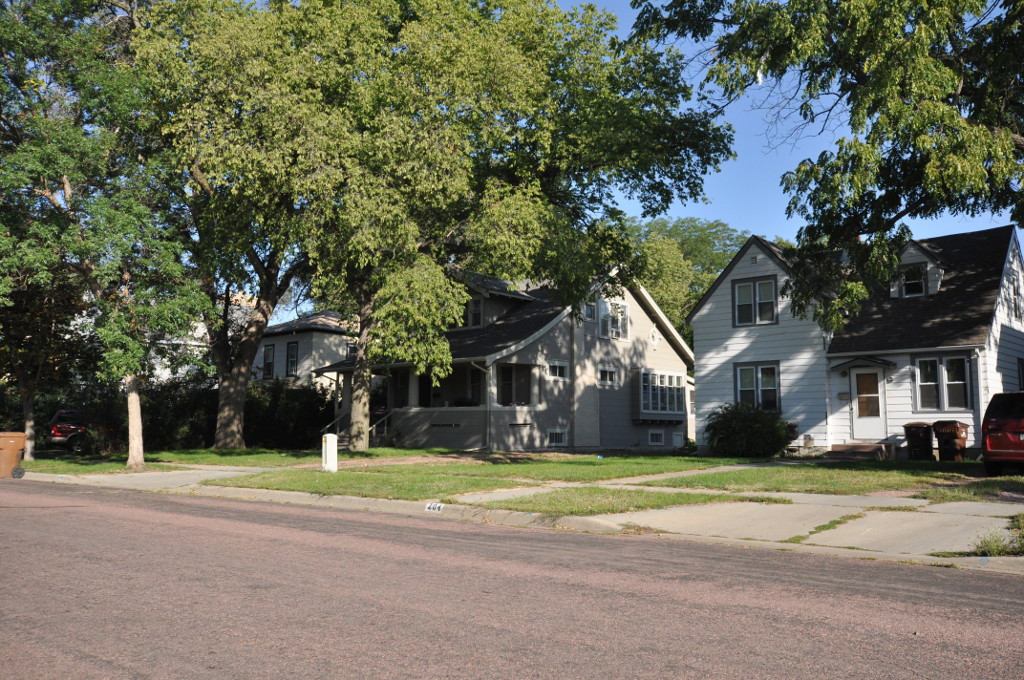

- Location within South Dakota Location within the United States
- Location: Roughly bounded by First and Seventh Aves., Mitchell, South Dakota
- Coordinates: 43°42′46″N 98°01′40″W
- Area: 25 acres (10 ha)
- Built: c. 1883 on
- Architect: Walter J. Dixon; Floyd F. Kings
- Architectural style: Italianate, Second Empire, et al.
- NRHP reference No.: 99000676
- Added to NRHP: June 16, 1999

The Mitchell West Central Residential Historic District, in Mitchell, South Dakota, is a mostly residential historic district which was listed on the National Register of Historic Places in 1999.

About 25 acres (10 ha) in area, covering about 12 square blocks, it is roughly bounded by First and Seventh Avenues. It included 105 contributing buildings and 54 non-contributing ones, on 94 parcels. It includes some of the oldest buildings in the city, including houses dating from about 1883 to about 1938. Among other styles it includes Italianate and Second Empire architecture.

It includes Koch Flats, a three-story wood frame apartment building at 209 W. 2nd Ave. which was built in 1880 as the town's first public school, the Whittier School. It was moved about two blocks from its original location in 1895, and was renovated under direction of local architects Walter J. Dixon and Floyd F. Kings in 1938. It is Mitchell's best example of Art Deco style.

Dixon and King are believed also to have designed the Wilson Apartments, at 404 N. Duff St., built c. 1929.
