= Lincoln House (Stickney, South Dakota) =

- U.S. National Register of Historic Places
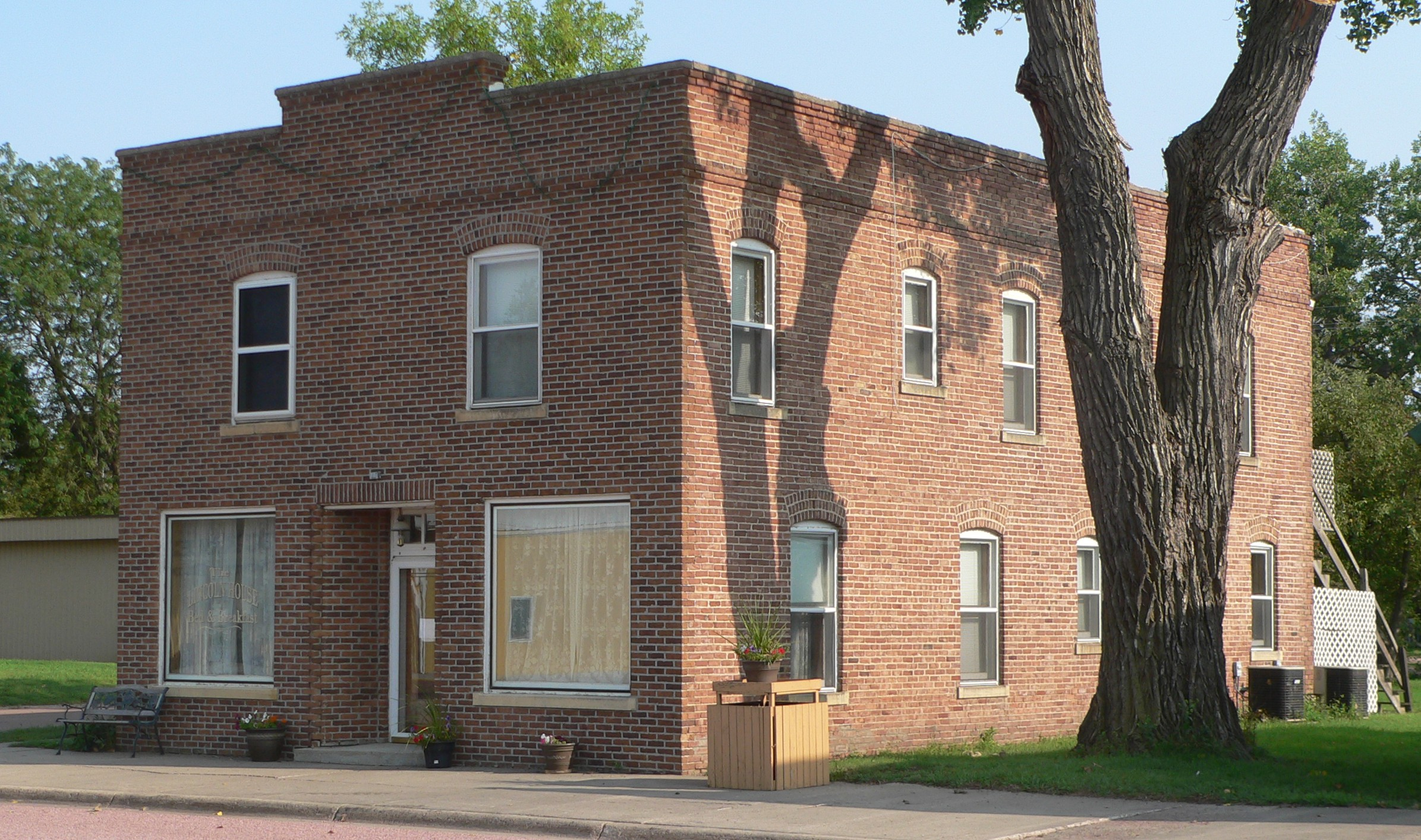

- Location within South Dakota Location within the United States
- Location: 321 Main Street, Stickney, South Dakota
- Coordinates: 43.588844°N 98.437438°W
- Built: 1915
- Built by: Sylvester Miller
- Architectural style: Early Commercial
- NRHP reference No.: 02000023
- Added to NRHP: February 14, 2002

The Lincoln House in Stickney, South Dakota was built in the Early Commercial architectural style by Sylvester Miller. It primarily functioned as a medical office for a Dr. Beukelman. It has two contributing buildings on the property.

It was constructed in 1915 and added to the National Register of Historic Places in 2002. It is built of red-brown brick laid in common bond, on a stone foundation, and has a flat roof.

It was deemed notable as "a good example of Commercial architecture and ... one of few historic commercial buildings left in Stickney."

A side gable historic privy is the second contributing resource on the property.
