= Patten Consolidated School =

- U.S. National Register of Historic Places
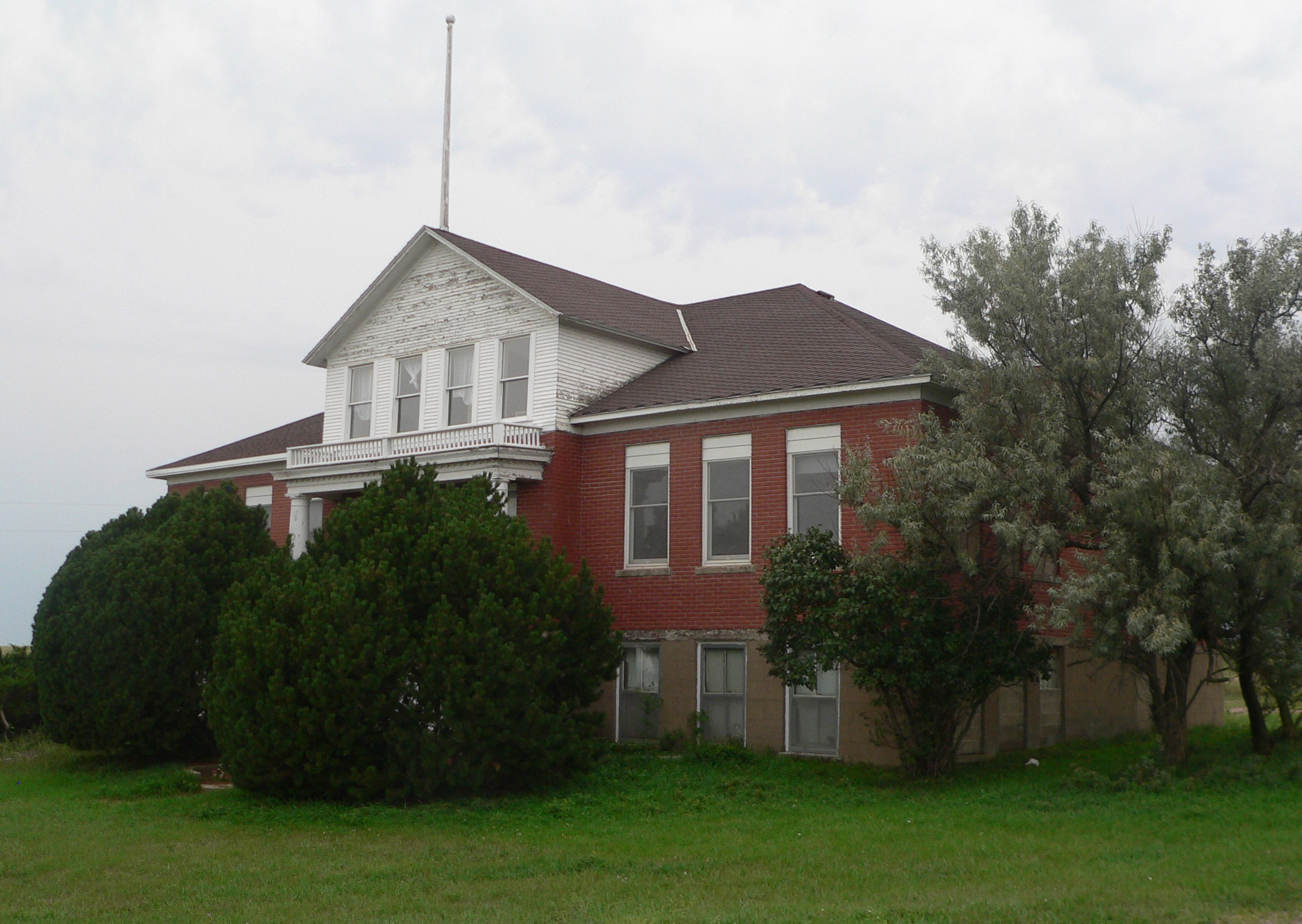

- Location within South Dakota Location within the United States
- Nearest city: White Lake, South Dakota
- Coordinates: 43°53′32″N 98°44′54″W
- Built: 1914
- MPS: Schools in South Dakota MPS
- NRHP reference No.: 08000797
- Added to NRHP: August 22, 2008

The Patten Consolidated School is a school building in Aurora County, South Dakota. It was built in 1914 and added to the National Register of Historic Places in 2008.

Its NRHP nomination noted that it "is rather unique for a rural school, in that it is constructed of brick. The majority of rural schools in South Dakota that were built in the early twentieth century were made of wood. This vernacular building with a hipped roof, a concrete beltcourse directly above the first floor and long large windows with a centered chimney near the south end was constructed in 1914."

It was significant as the first school in South Dakota to take advantage of 1913 legislation providing for consolidation of schools; it replace four smaller rural schools.
