= Unityville, South Dakota =

- Unincorporated community
- Location within South Dakota
- Coordinates: 43°48′05″N 97°27′09″W
- Country: United States
- State: South Dakota
- County: McCook
- Elevation: 1,529 ft (466 m)
- Time zone: UTC-6 (Central (CST))
  - Summer (DST): UTC-5 (CDT)
- Area code: 605
- GNIS feature ID: 1258713

Unityville is an unincorporated community in McCook County, South Dakota, United States. Unityville is 6.2 miles (10.0 km) north-northwest of Salem.

Unityville was originally called Stark, and under the latter name was laid out in 1907 by J. F. Stark, and named for him.
