= Salem Common Historic District (Salem, New Hampshire) =

Historic district in New Hampshire, United States

- U.S. National Register of Historic Places
- U.S. Historic district
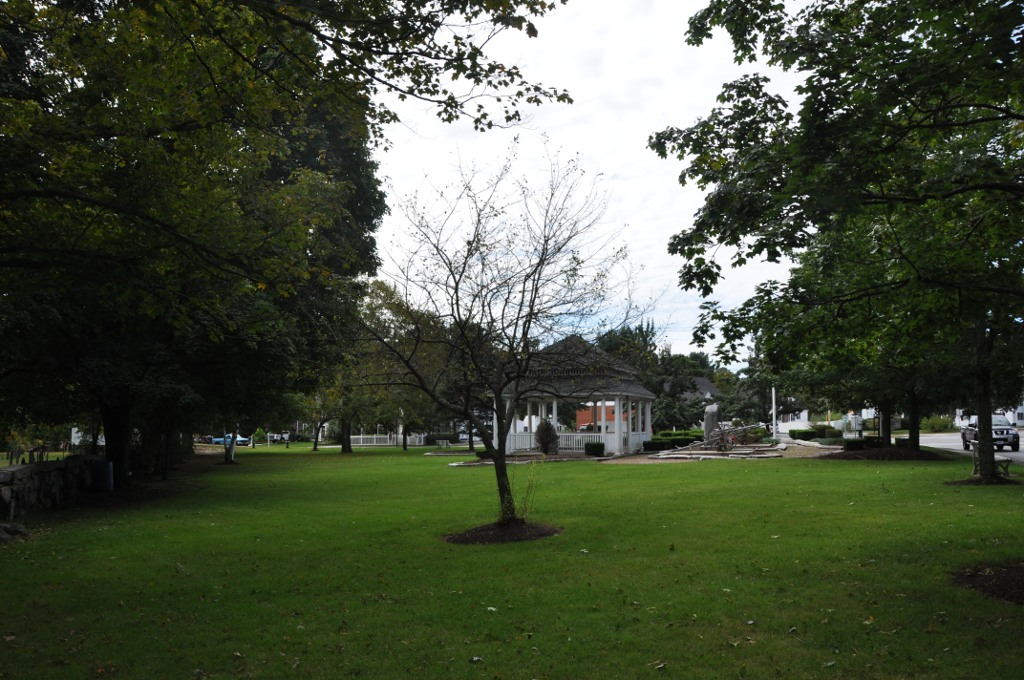
- Salem Common

- Location within New Hampshire Location within the United States
- Location: 304, 310, 312 Main St., Salem, New Hampshire
- Coordinates: 42°47′22″N 71°12′1″W
- Area: 3.5 acres (1.4 ha)
- Built: 1738
- NRHP reference No.: 11000190
- Added to NRHP: April 15, 2011

The Salem Common Historic District encompasses the early colonial center of Salem, New Hampshire. The district dates to the earliest period of settlement of Salem, and includes the historic common, old town hall, fire station, and library. The town hall was built in 1738 and extensively altered in 1838 and 1899; it served as a place for town meetings until 1958. The district was listed on the National Register of Historic Places in 2011.

== Description and history ==
Salem was settled in the 17th century as part of Methuen, Massachusetts, and was incorporated in 1750, after the border between Massachusetts and New Hampshire was fixed, dividing that town. The Salem Common was laid out about 1741, not far from the original location of the building now known as the Old Town Hall. The Old Town Hall was built in 1738 as a colonial meeting house, and served as the community's civic center into the 1940s. It was moved a short distance to its present location adjacent to the common in 1838, the year in which it also ceased housing religious services. It underwent a number of alterations in the 18th and early 19th centuries, including some designed by architect Henry Vaughan in 1899. It housed a municipal court on the upper level from 1961 to 1973, and housed community organization activities until 1981, when it was taken over by the local historical society.

In addition to the old town hall, the historic district includes an 1861 district schoolhouse which now serves as a branch library, and a 1906 fire station. The common is the site of a number of war memorials, commemorating the military service of Salem natives in various military conflicts, and the town's original burying ground, which dates to about 1741, the year in which the border was determined. It houses several hundred graves, arranged in rows overlooking the Spicket River and bounded by a rubblestone wall.

== See also ==
- National Register of Historic Places listings in Rockingham County, New Hampshire
