= Plankinton, South Dakota =

- City
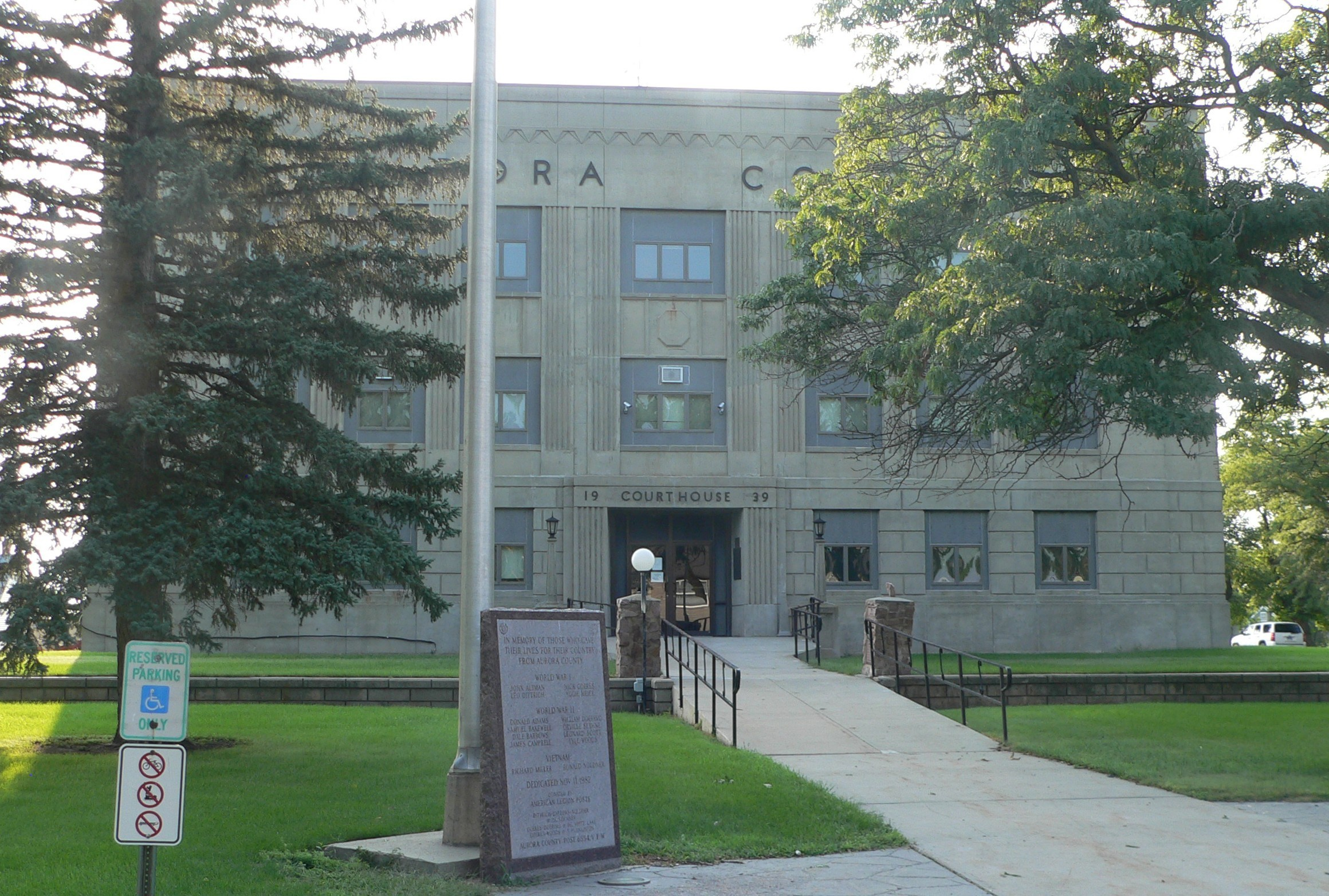
- Aurora County Courthouse

- Location in Aurora County and the state of South Dakota
- Coordinates: 43°42′55″N 98°29′01″W
- Country: United States
- State: South Dakota
- County: Aurora
- Incorporated: 1887

Government
  - Mayor: Joe Staller

Area
  - Total: 0.76 sq mi (1.98 km^{2})
  - Land: 0.76 sq mi (1.98 km^{2})
  - Water: 0 sq mi (0.00 km^{2})
- Elevation: 1,519 ft (463 m)

Population (2020)
  - Total: 781
  - Density: 1,023.1/sq mi (395.03/km^{2})
- Time zone: UTC-6 (Central (CST))
  - Summer (DST): UTC-5 (CDT)
- ZIP code: 57368
- Area code: 605
- FIPS code: 46-50020
- GNIS feature ID: 1267534
- Website: www.cityofplankinton.com

Plankinton, colloquially known as Plank, is a city in and the county seat of Aurora County, South Dakota, United States. The population was 781 at the 2020 census.

== History ==
Plankinton sprang up with the arrival of the Chicago, Milwaukee, St. Paul and Pacific Railroad to the area in 1880. The town was named for Milwaukee-based meatpacker and railroad official John Plankinton.

The voters approved the incorporation of Plankinton as a village in an election on September 7, 1882. The first officials were elected on September 22, 1882. The first village trustees were C. Thompson, C.C. Irons, T.C. Granger, W.H. Ferguson.

On 7 October 1897, the girls' dormitory at the State Industrial School in town burned, killing seven people.

Plankinton was home to an annual wheat palace, which became a successful regional attraction and inspired the Corn Palace in nearby Mitchell. The first Grain Palace in South Dakota opened in Plankinton on September 29, 1891, while the last closed in October 1892.

== Geography ==
According to the United States Census Bureau, the city has a total area of 0.76 square miles (1.97 km^{2}), all land.

== Demographics ==
Historical population
Census	Pop.	Note	%±
1890	654		—
1900	465		−28.9%
1910	712		53.1%
1920	803		12.8%
1930	758		−5.6%
1940	694		−8.4%
1950	754		8.6%
1960	644		−14.6%
1970	613		−4.8%
1980	644		5.1%
1990	604		−6.2%
2000	601		−0.5%
2010	707		17.6%
2020	781		10.5%
U.S. Decennial Census

=== 2020 census ===
As of the 2020 census, Plankinton had a population of 781 and a median age of 40.3 years. 25.2% of residents were under the age of 18 and 19.2% of residents were 65 years of age or older. For every 100 females there were 96.7 males, and for every 100 females age 18 and over there were 100.7 males age 18 and over.

0.0% of residents lived in urban areas, while 100.0% lived in rural areas.

There were 311 households in Plankinton, of which 33.4% had children under the age of 18 living in them. Of all households, 52.4% were married-couple households, 18.3% were households with a male householder and no spouse or partner present, and 22.2% were households with a female householder and no spouse or partner present. About 26.0% of all households were made up of individuals and 11.9% had someone living alone who was 65 years of age or older.

There were 336 housing units, of which 7.4% were vacant. The homeowner vacancy rate was 0.9% and the rental vacancy rate was 7.5%.

Racial composition as of the 2020 census
Race	Number	Percent
White	598	76.6%
Black or African American	6	0.8%
American Indian and Alaska Native	9	1.2%
Asian	4	0.5%
Native Hawaiian and Other Pacific Islander	0	0.0%
Some other race	110	14.1%
Two or more races	54	6.9%
Hispanic or Latino (of any race)	163	20.9%

=== 2010 census ===
As of the census of 2010, there were 707 people, 294 households, and 191 families residing in the city. The population density was 930.3 inhabitants per square mile (359.2/km^{2}). There were 341 housing units at an average density of 448.7 units per square mile (173.2 units/km^{2}). The racial makeup of the city was 92.8% White, 0.7% African American, 0.4% Native American, 5.8% from other races, and 0.3% from two or more races. Hispanic or Latino of any race were 10.2% of the population.

There were 294 households, of which 30.6% had children under the age of 18 living with them, 50.7% were married couples living together, 10.2% had a female householder with no husband present, 4.1% had a male householder with no wife present, and 35.0% were non-families. 29.9% of all households were made up of individuals, and 13.3% had someone living alone who was 65 years of age or older. The average household size was 2.40 and the average family size was 2.99.

The median age in the city was 38.6 years. 26.2% of residents were under the age of 18; 4.7% were between the ages of 18 and 24; 26.3% were from 25 to 44; 25.5% were from 45 to 64; and 17.3% were 65 years of age or older. The gender makeup of the city was 49.6% male and 50.4% female.

=== 2000 census ===
As of the census of 2000, there were 601 people, 265 households, and 170 families residing in the city. The population density was 920.6 inhabitants per square mile (355.4/km^{2}). There were 298 housing units at an average density of 456.5 units per square mile (176.3 units/km^{2}). The racial makeup of the city was 94.51% White, 0.17% Native American, 0.17% Asian, 3.99% from other races, and 1.16% from two or more races. Hispanic or Latino of any race were 5.99% of the population.

There were 265 households, out of which 25.3% had children under the age of 18 living with them, 53.2% were married couples living together, 7.5% had a female householder with no husband present, and 35.5% were non-families. 34.3% of all households were made up of individuals, and 20.4% had someone living alone who was 65 years of age or older. The average household size was 2.27 and the average family size was 2.89.

In the city, the population was spread out, with 22.1% under the age of 18, 8.0% from 18 to 24, 23.1% from 25 to 44, 26.0% from 45 to 64, and 20.8% who were 65 years of age or older. The median age was 42 years. For every 100 females, there were 95.8 males. For every 100 females age 18 and over, there were 91.0 males.

The median income for a household in the city was $32,019, and the median income for a family was $40,809. Males had a median income of $26,645 versus $19,531 for females. The per capita income for the city was $15,611. About 3.5% of families and 6.2% of the population were below the poverty line, including 5.1% of those under age 18 and 6.8% of those age 65 or over.

== See also ==
- List of cities in South Dakota
