= National Register of Historic Places listings in Hanson County, South Dakota =

Location of Hanson County in South Dakota

This is a list of the National Register of Historic Places listings in Hanson County, South Dakota.

This is intended to be a complete list of the properties on the National Register of Historic Places in Hanson County, South Dakota, United States. The locations of National Register properties for which the latitude and longitude coordinates are included below, may be seen in a map.

There are 6 properties listed on the National Register in the county, including 1 National Historic Landmark. Another property was once listed but has since been removed.

This National Park Service list is complete through NPS recent listings posted March 14, 2025.

== Current listings ==
	Name on the Register	Image	Date listed	Location	City or town	Description
1	Bloom Site	Bloom Site	October 15, 1966 (#66000714)	Address restricted	Bloom	
2	Fort James (39HS48)	Fort James (39HS48)	March 15, 1984 (#84003290)	Address restricted	Rosedale Colony	
3	Old Rockport Hutterite Colony		June 30, 1982 (#82003929)	Off the James River; 43°34′55″N 97°50′27″W	Alexandria	
4	Sheldon Reese Site (39HS23)	Sheldon Reese Site (39HS23)	March 15, 1984 (#84003292)	Address restricted	Mitchell	
5	Saint Peter's Grotto	Saint Peter's Grotto	November 5, 2001 (#01000686)	0.5 miles north of the former Chicago and North Western railroad tracks 43°43′33″N 97°41′14″W	Farmer	
6	Site 39HS3	Site 39HS3	January 31, 1984 (#84003294)	Address restricted	Mitchell	

== Former listing ==
	Name on the Register	Image	Date listed	Date removed	Location	City or town	Description
1	South Dakota Department of Transportation Bridge No. 31-115-110		December 9, 1993 (#93001294)	March 26, 2008	Local road over Pierre Creek	Fulton	

== See also ==
- List of National Historic Landmarks in South Dakota
- National Register of Historic Places listings in South Dakota
