= South Dakota Highway 38 =

State highway in South Dakota, United States

Highway 38
- SD 38 highlighted in red

Route information
- Maintained by SDDOT
- Length: 63.393 mi (102.021 km)

Major junctions
- West end: I-90 BL in Mitchell
- US 81 in Salem; I-90 in Buffalo Ridge
- East end: I-29 in Sioux Falls

Location
- Country: United States
- State: South Dakota
- Counties: Davison; Hanson; McCook; Minnehaha

Highway system
- South Dakota State Trunk Highway System; Interstate; US; State
← SD 37A	→ SD 40

South Dakota Highway 38 (SD 38) is a 63.393-mile (102.021 km) state highway in southeastern South Dakota, United States, that runs from Mitchell to Sioux Falls.

== Route description ==
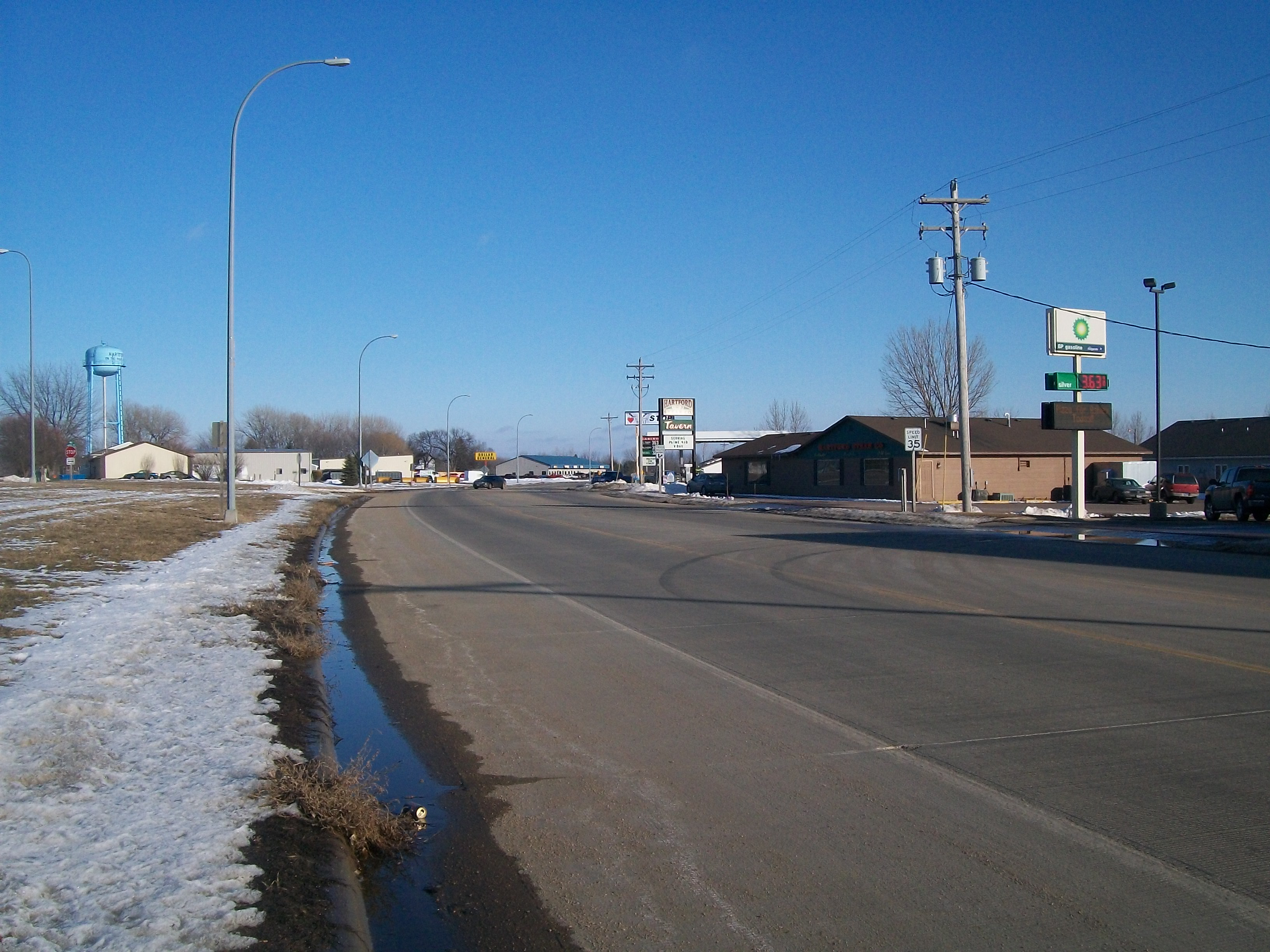
SD 38 (259th Street) eastbound in Hartford, March 2013

SD 38 begins at an intersection with a business loop of I-90 (Burr Street) along Havens Street in Mitchell. It runs east and leaves the city of Mitchell, then crosses the James River. As it crosses the river, the highway leaves Davison County and enters Hanson County. The route continues east, roughly paralleling I-90 to the north. It passes south of Fulton and then intersects SD 25. SD 38 then curves slightly to the north and enters McCook County. Later, it passes through Salem and intersects U.S. Route 81 (US 81). East of Salem, the highway curves to the southeast and passes through the southeastern corner of the city of Montrose. The route then bends further to the southeast and enters Minnehaha County.

About two miles (3.2 km) east of the county line, SD 38 turns to the east and intersects SD 19. The two routes run together through the northern part of Humboldt, where SD 19 splits off to the north and SD 38 continues east toward Hartford. Once it reaches Hartford, the highway bends to the southeast. Southeast of the city, SD 38 shares a folded diamond interchange with I-90. After this interchange, SD 38 curves to the east and enters Sioux Falls. About one mile (1.6 km) farther east, SD 38 meets its eastern terminus at another folded diamond interchange with I-29.

== Major intersections ==
County	Location	mi	km	Destinations	Notes
Davison	Mitchell	0.000	0.000	I-90 BL – Huron, Parkston	Western end
Hanson		3.550	5.713	To I-90 (SD 38P)	
Hanson	Farmer	17.646	28.398	SD 25 – I-90, Epiphany	
McCook	Salem	31.940	51.402	US 81 – I-90, Madison	
Minnehaha	Humboldt	48.563	78.155	SD 19 south – I-90	Western end of SD 19 overlap
Minnehaha	Humboldt	49.609	79.838	SD 19 north – Madison	Eastern end of SD 19 overlap
Minnehaha	Buffalo Ridge	59.078	95.077	I-90 – Mitchell, Sioux Falls	I-90 Exit 390
Minnehaha	Sioux Falls	64.393	103.630	I-29 – Sioux Falls, Brookings	I-29 Exit 83; eastern end
1.000 mi = 1.609 km; 1.000 km = 0.621 mi: Concurrency terminus

== See also ==
- List of state highways in South Dakota
