= South Dakota Highway 262 =

State highway in South Dakota, United States

Highway 262

Route information
- Maintained by SDDOT
- Length: 17.563 mi (28.265 km)

Major junctions
- West end: I-90 north of Alexandria
- SD 25 near Emery
- East end: SD 42 in Bridgewater

Location
- Country: United States
- State: South Dakota
- Counties: Hanson, McCook

Highway system
- South Dakota State Trunk Highway System; Interstate; US; State
← SD 258	→ SD 264

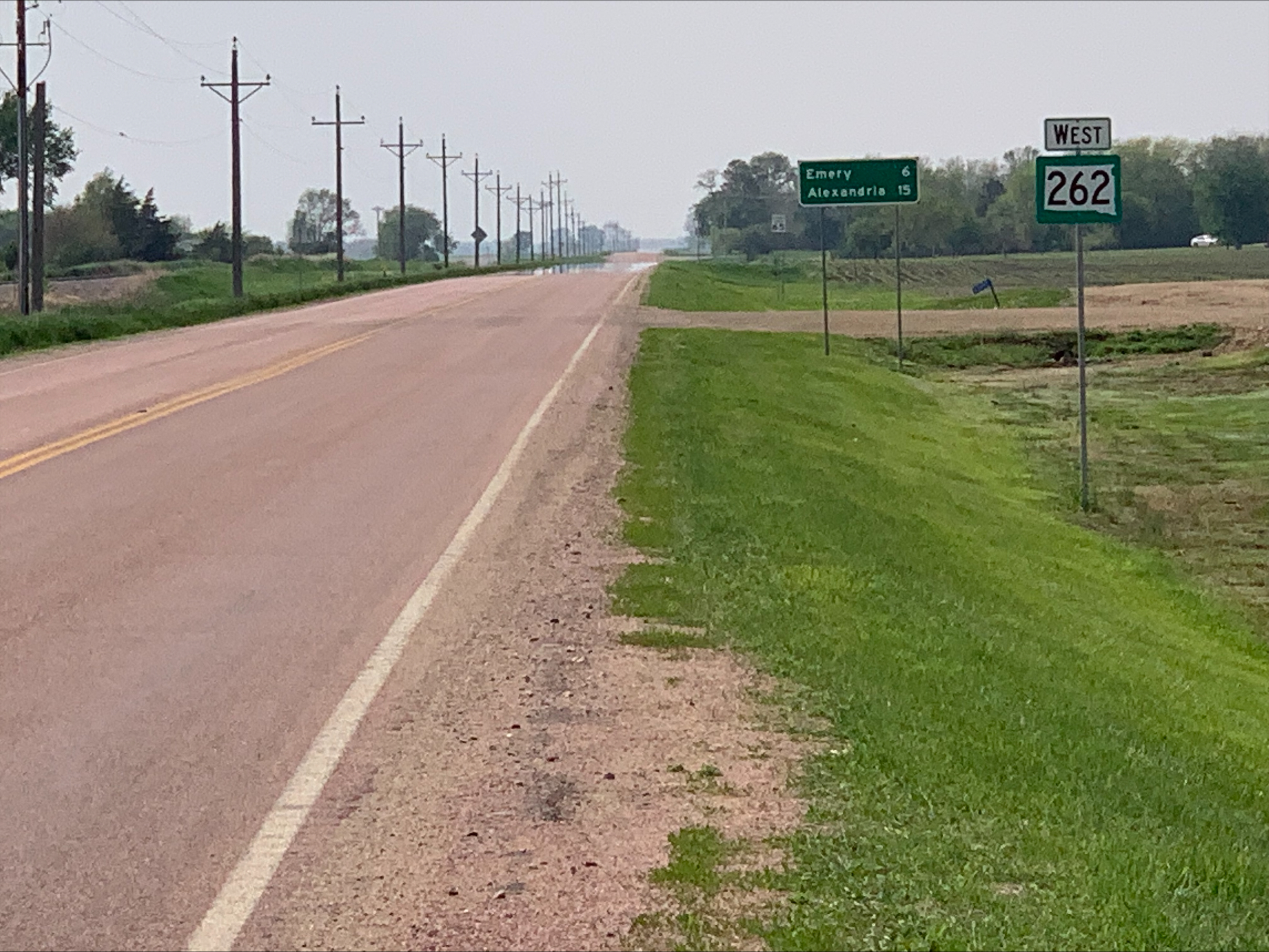
South Dakota Highway 262 heading westbound out of Bridgewater, South Dakota

South Dakota Highway 262 (SD 262) is a 17.563-mile-long (28.265 km) state highway in the U.S. state of South Dakota that runs from Interstate 90 (I-90) near Alexandria to SD 42 in Bridgewater. It is maintained by the South Dakota Department of Transportation (SDDOT).

== Route description ==
SD 262 begins at a diamond interchange with I-90 in rural Hanson County and heads south. The road almost immediately enters the city of Alexandria and takes the name of Spruce Street. In Alexandria, the route curves to the southeast and parallels a railroad. After this, SD 262 leaves the city and continues southeast. The highway crosses Pierre Creek just east of the city and passes through a series of curves which take the highway farther southeast. The road continues to parallel the railroad and intersects the southern terminus of SD 25 before traversing the community of Emery. East of Emery, SD 262 treks farther southeast through open plains and enters McCook County. The route travels for about six miles (9.7 km), then enters Bridgewater. Here, the highway reaches its eastern terminus at an intersection with SD 42.

SD 262 is maintained by SDDOT. In 2012, the traffic on the road was measured in average annual daily traffic. SD 262 had a high of 1,935 vehicles in Alexandria and a low of 565 vehicles between the Hanson–McCook county line and Bridgewater.

== History ==
SD 262 follows part of the former routing of U.S. Route 16.

== Major intersections ==
County	Location	mi	km	Destinations	Notes
Hanson	Wayne Township	0.000	0.000	I-90 – Mitchell, Sioux Falls	I-90 Exit 344. Western terminus.
Hanson	Pleasant Township	8.563	13.781	SD 25 north – I-90	Southern terminus of SD 25
McCook	Bridgewater	17.563	28.265	SD 42 – Ethan, US 81, Sioux Falls	Eastern terminus
1.000 mi = 1.609 km; 1.000 km = 0.621 mi
