= South Dakota Highway 19 =

State highway in South Dakota, United States

Highway 19

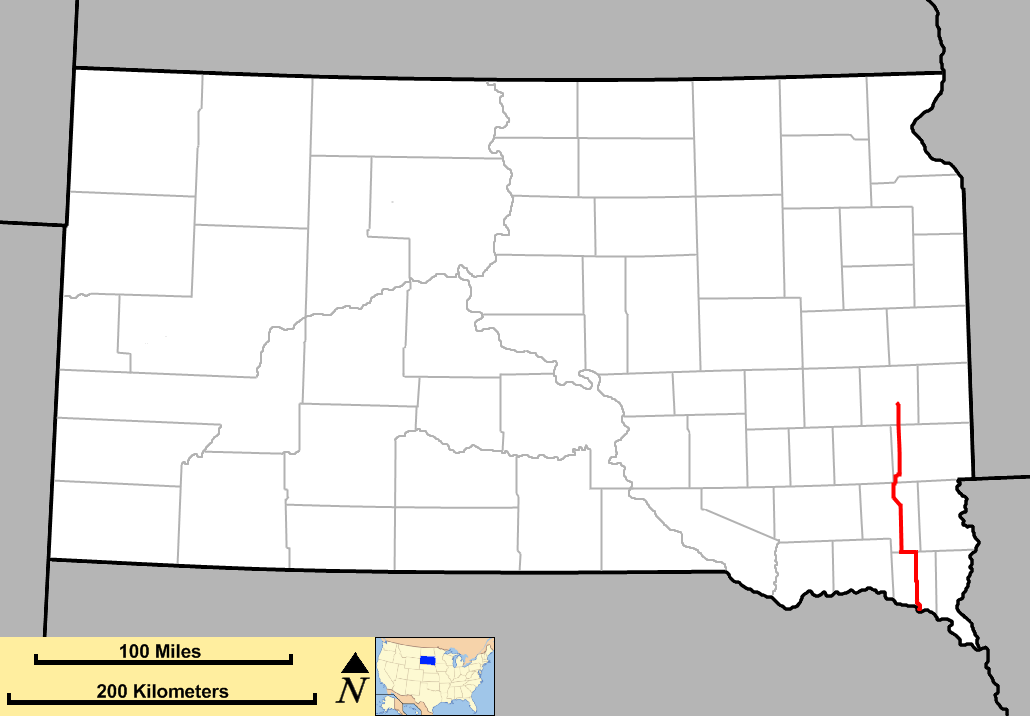
- Map of South Dakota with SD 19 in red

Route information
- Maintained by SDDOT
- Length: 86.974 mi (139.971 km)
- Existed: 1926–present

Major junctions
- South end: N-15 at the Nebraska state line south of Vermillion
- SD 19A / SD 46 south of Centerville; SD 46 east of Irene; US 18 south of Hurley; SD 44 from southeast of Parker to Parker; SD 42 northeast of Monroe; I-90 west of Humboldt; SD 38 from west of Humboldt to Humboldt
- North end: SD 34 southeast of Madison

Location
- Country: United States
- State: South Dakota
- Counties: Clay; Turner; Minnehaha; Lake

Highway system
- South Dakota State Trunk Highway System; Interstate; US; State
← SD 18	→ SD 20

South Dakota Highway 19 (SD 19) is a 86.974-mile (139.971 km) state highway in southeastern South Dakota, United States. It connects the Nebraska state line, south of Vermillion, with the southeastern part of the Madison area, via Viborg, Hurley, Parker, and Humboldt. SD 19 formerly entered Centerville, but was shifted to the south. Its former path was redesignated as SD 19A. Its former southern terminus was at Vermillion, but was extended when a new bridge from Nebraska opened.

== Route description ==
SD 19 begins at the Nebraska state line south of Vermillion, in the south-central part of Clay County. Here, the roadway continues to the south-southwest as Nebraska Highway 15 (N-15) over the Missouri River. This crossing is part of the Missouri National Recreational River. It winds its way through rural areas of the county to the north-northwest. It passes just west of Harold Davidson Field, the airport for Vermillion. Just south of an intersection with the eastern terminus of Timber Road, the highway curves to the northeast. It then begins a concurrency with SD 50 Business (SD 50 Bus.). The two highways travel to the southeast and curve to the east-southeast. They cross over the Vermillion River. Just east of an intersection with the western terminus of West Main Street, they begin the curve to the northeast. During this curve, they cross over some railroad tracks of BNSF Railway on a road bridge. They enter the city limits of Vermillion and then curve to the east. At an intersection with West Cherry Street and Stanford Street, the highways split, SD 50 Bus. continues to the east on West Cherry Street, while SD 19 turns left onto Stanford Street and heads to the north. SD 19 leaves the city limits of Vermillion and then intersects SD 50. It curves to the north-northwest and has a second crossing of the Vermillion River. Between 312th and 311th streets, it skirts along the eastern edge of Spirit Mound Historic Prairie. Just south of 308th Street, it curves to the north-northwest. Just south of 462nd Avenue, it begins to curve back to the north. Between 304th and 303rd streets, it curves to the north-northeast and crosses over the Vermillion River for a third time. Just north of 302nd Street, the highway curves to the north-northwest. Just north of 301st Street is a fourth crossing of the Vermillion River. Just north of 299th Street is a fifth crossing of this river. Just south of 297th Street is a sixth crossing. Almost immediately, it reaches the Turner County line.

On the county line, SD 19 intersects SD 46 (297th Street) and the southern terminus of SD 19A. SD 19 and SD 46 begin a concurrency to the west. Between an intersection with both the northern terminus of Frog Creek Road and the southern terminus of 459th Avenue and an intersection with 458th Avenue, the highways cross over Klepke Ditch and Frog Creek. At an intersection with 456th Avenue, SD 19 splits off to the north-northeast and enters Turner County proper.

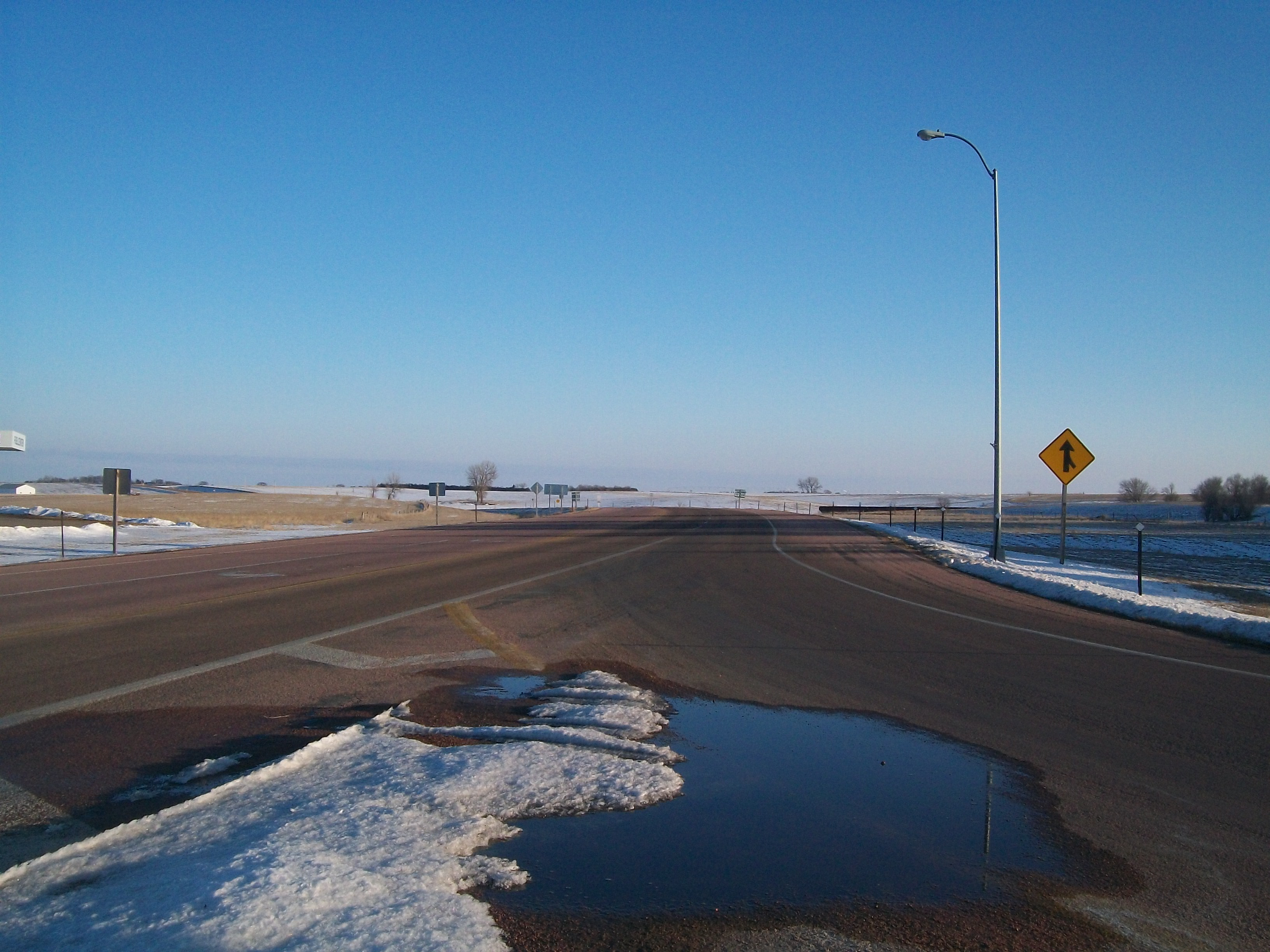
SD 19 has a concurrency with SD 44 in Parker, March 2013

Between 296th and 295th streets, SD 19 crosses over Frog Creek again and curves to the north-northwest. At 295th Street, it intersects the western terminus of SD 19A. Just south of 294th Street, it curves to the north. North of 292nd Street, it enters the city limits of Viborg. An intersection with Pioneer Avenue leads to Pioneer Memorial Hospital & Health Services. The highway then leaves the city limits of Viborg. Just south of 288th Street, it crosses over Turkey Ridge Creek. At 286th Street, SD 19 begins a concurrency with U.S. Route 18 (US 18) for just over 1.5 miles (2.4 km); they split at 285th Street. Between 284th and 283rd streets, it briefly travels through the far eastern part of Hurley. At 277th Street, it begins a concurrency with SD 44. This intersection is also the eastern terminus of County Road 24 (CR 24). The two highways curve to the northwest. They cross over some railroad tracks of BNSF Railway and curve to the north-northwest and enter the city limits of Parker. At Fourth Street, SD 44 splits off to the west-northwest and heads towards the business district of Parker. SD 19 curves to the north-northeast and leaves Parker. It then curves back to the north. Just south of 274th Street, it crosses over the West Fork Vermillion River. Just south of 271st Street, it crosses over the East Fork Vermillion River. At an intersection with 268th Street, the highway enters the extreme southwestern part of Minnehaha County.

Just south of 267th Street, SD 19 crosses over Elce Creek. At 265th Street, it begins a concurrency with SD 42 to the east. The roadway continues to the north as 455th Avenue. SD 19 and SD 42 travel to the east for about 1 mile (1.6 km). SD 19 splits off to the north, while the roadway continues to the south as 456th Avenue. Between 263rd and 262nd streets, it passes just to the west of Lost Lake.

Just to the west of Humboldt, it has an interchange with Interstate 90 (I-90). Almost immediately is an intersection with SD 38. At this intersection, both highways travel concurrently to the east-southeast, while the roadway continues to the north as 456th Avenue. The two highways wind through the northern part of Humboldt. When they split, SD 19 resumes its northward direction. Between 256th and 255th streets, it passes just west of Lost Lake. At an intersection with 244th Street, which is northwest of Buffalo Lake, the highway enters the south-central part of Lake County.

SD 19 travels through rural areas of the county. Just west of Lake Madison, and just north of 236th Street, the highway curves to the north-northwest. Just to the west of Bourne Slough, and just south of 235th Street, it begins a curve to the north-northeast. It then meets its northern terminus, an intersection with SD 34 just southeast of Madison.

== History ==
SD 19 was established in 1926. It used to travel through Centerville. Around 1950, it was shifted southward, onto a concurrency with SD 46. Its former path was redesignated as SD 19A. In November 2001, SD 19's southern terminus was extended southward from Vermilion, when a new bridge to Nebraska was opened.

== Major intersections ==
County	Location	mi	km	Destinations	Notes
Clay		0.000	0.000	N-15 south	Southern terminus
Clay		5.487	8.830	SD 50 Bus. west – Yankton	Southern end of SD 50 Bus. concurrency
Clay	Vermillion	6.334	10.194	SD 50 Bus. east (West Cherry Street) / Stanford Street south – Vermillion	Northern end of SD 50 Bus. concurrency; roadway continues as Stanford Street.
Clay		6.915	11.129	SD 50 – I-29, Yankton	
Clay–Turner county line		27.024	43.491	SD 19A north / SD 46 east (297th Street) – Centerville, Beresford	Southern end of SD 46 concurrency; southern terminus of SD 19A; former SD 19 north
Clay–Turner county line		28.905	46.518	SD 46 west (297th Street) / 456th Avenue south – Irene	Northern end of SD 46 concurrency; roadway continues as 456th Avenue.
Turner		32.653	52.550	SD 19A east (295th Street west) – Centerville	Western terminus of SD 19A; former SD 19 south
Turner		38.041	61.221	US 18 west (286th Street) – Menno	Southern end of US 18 concurrency
Turner		39.658	63.823	US 18 east (285th Street) – Davis	Northern end of US 18 concurrency
Turner		46.041	74.096	SD 44 east (277th Street) – Chancellor	Southern end of SD 44 concurrency; eastern terminus of County Road 24 (CR 24; 277th Street)
Turner	Parker	46.071	74.144	SD 44 west (Fourth Street) – Marion, Business district	Northern end of SD 44 concurrency
Minnehaha		56.345	90.678	SD 42 west (265th Street) / 455th Avenue north – Mitchell	Southern end of SD 42 concurrency; roadway continues as 455th Avenue.
Minnehaha		62.782	101.038	SD 42 east (265th street) / 456th Avenue south – Sioux Falls	Northern end of SD 42 concurrency; roadway continues as 456th Avenue.
Minnehaha		63.287– 63.428	101.851– 102.077	I-90 – Mitchell, Sioux Falls	I-90 exit 379
Minnehaha		63.468	102.142	SD 38 west / 456th Avenue north – Montrose	Southern end of SD 38 concurrency; roadway continues as 456th Avenue.
Minnehaha	Humboldt	63.679	102.481	SD 38 east – Sioux Falls	Northern end of SD 38 concurrency
Lake		86.966– 86.974	139.958– 139.971	SD 34 – Madison, Colman	Northern terminus
1.000 mi = 1.609 km; 1.000 km = 0.621 mi: Concurrency terminus

== Related routes ==
Highway 19A
- Location: Centerville
- Length: 8.161 mi (13.134 km)
- Existed: 1950–present

South Dakota Highway 19A (SD 19A) is a 8.161-mile-long (13.134 km) alternate route of SD 19 that is in the southeastern part of Turner County. It extends from an intersection with SD 19 and SD 46 to another intersection with SD 19, via Centerville. It is signed north–south from its southern terminus to Centerville and west–east from Centerville to its western terminus. SD 19A is legally defined in South Dakota Codified Laws § 31-4-144.

SD 19A begins at an intersection with SD 19 and SD 46 (297th Street) south of Centerville. This intersection is on the Clay–Turner county line. It travels to the north-northeast and crosses over the Vermillion River. Just south of 296th Street, the highway begins to curve to the north. Just before entering the city limits of Centerville, it crosses over the Noble Ditch. In the city is an intersection with State Street and the southern terminus of Broadway Street. The latter street is a truck route through the city. At this intersection, SD 19A turns left onto State Street and travels to the west-southwest. It travels through a residential area of Centerville and then leave the city. It crosses over the Vermillion River again and then curves to the west. It then crosses over Turkey Ridge Creek. Just west of 460th Avenue, it crosses over Bonine Ditch. It travels through rural areas of the county. At an intersection with 457th Avenue, it curves to the west-northwest. It then reaches its western terminus, a second intersection with SD 19 (456th Avenue). At this intersection, the roadway continues as County Road 24 (CR 24; 295th Street).

The alignment of SD 19A was originally a portion of SD 19. Around 1950, the routing was changed so that SD 19 followed SD 46 for a 6-mile (9.7 km) stretch, bypassing Centerville to the south. At that time, the original route was given the SD 19A designation.

County	Location	mi	km	Destinations	Notes
Clay–Turner county line		0.000	0.000	SD 19 / SD 46 (297th Street) – Vermillion, Beresford, Irene	Southern terminus
Turner	Centerville	2.317	3.729	To I-29 / Broadway Street north / State Street east	Southern terminus of Broadway Street; truck route
Turner		8.161	13.134	SD 19 / CR 24 west (295th Street) – Irene, Viborg	Western terminus of SD 19A; eastern terminus of CR 24
1.000 mi = 1.609 km; 1.000 km = 0.621 mi

== See also ==
- List of state highways in South Dakota
