= Rockport Colony, South Dakota =

- Unincorporated community
- Location of Rockport Colony, South Dakota
- Coordinates: 43°34′55″N 97°50′35″W
- Country: United States
- State: South Dakota
- County: Hanson

Area
  - Total: 0.22 sq mi (0.56 km^{2})
  - Land: 0.22 sq mi (0.56 km^{2})
  - Water: 0 sq mi (0.00 km^{2})
- Elevation: 1,250 ft (380 m)

Population (2020)
  - Total: 77
  - Density: 353.7/sq mi (136.57/km^{2})
- Time zone: UTC-6 (Central (CST))
  - Summer (DST): UTC-5 (CDT)
- ZIP code: 57311
- Area code: 605
- GNIS feature ID: 2813030

Rockport Colony is a Hutterite colony and census-designated place in Hanson County, South Dakota, United States. It is located on the James River, southwest of Alexandria and southeast of Mitchell, and is part of the Mitchell Micropolitan Statistical Area. The population was 77 at the 2020 census. The elevation is 1,224 feet.

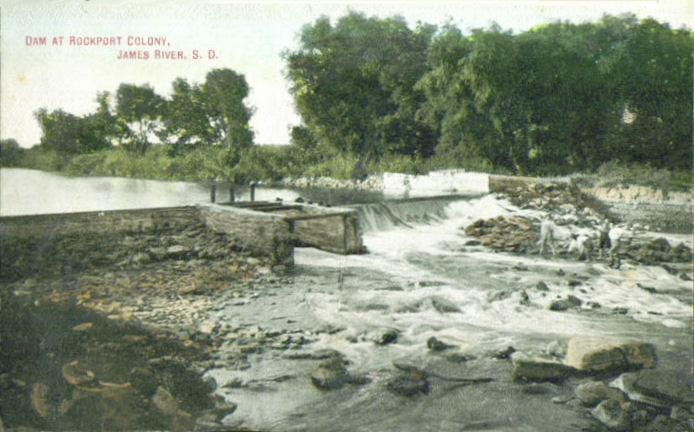
Dam on the James River at Rockport Colony, ca. 1915

The Rockport Colony Elementary School, which had 24 students in 2008, is not located in Rockport Colony, but is physically in the town of Alexandria.

== Demographics ==
Historical population
Census	Pop.	Note	%±
2020	77		—
U.S. Decennial Census
