= Oak Lane Colony, South Dakota =

- Census-designated place
- Location within South Dakota Location within the United States
- Coordinates: 43°30′36″N 97°44′28″W
- Country: United States
- State: South Dakota
- County: Hanson

Area
  - Total: 0.57 sq mi (1.48 km^{2})
  - Land: 0.57 sq mi (1.48 km^{2})
  - Water: 0 sq mi (0.00 km^{2})
- Elevation: 1,303 ft (397 m)

Population (2020)
  - Total: 138
  - Density: 241.0/sq mi (93.05/km^{2})
- Time zone: UTC-6 (Central (CST))
  - Summer (DST): UTC-5 (CDT)
- ZIP Code: 57311 (Alexandria)
- Area code: 605
- FIPS code: 46-46388
- GNIS feature ID: 2813029

Oak Lane Colony is a Hutterite colony and census-designated place (CDP) in Hanson County, South Dakota, United States. The population was 138 at the 2020 census. It was first listed as a CDP prior to the 2020 census.

It is in the southern part of the county, 13 miles (21 km) by road south-southeast of Alexandria, the county seat, and the same distance southwest of Emery.

== Demographics ==
Historical population
Census	Pop.	Note	%±
2020	138		—
U.S. Decennial Census
