= South Dakota Highway 42 =

State highway in South Dakota, United States

Highway 42

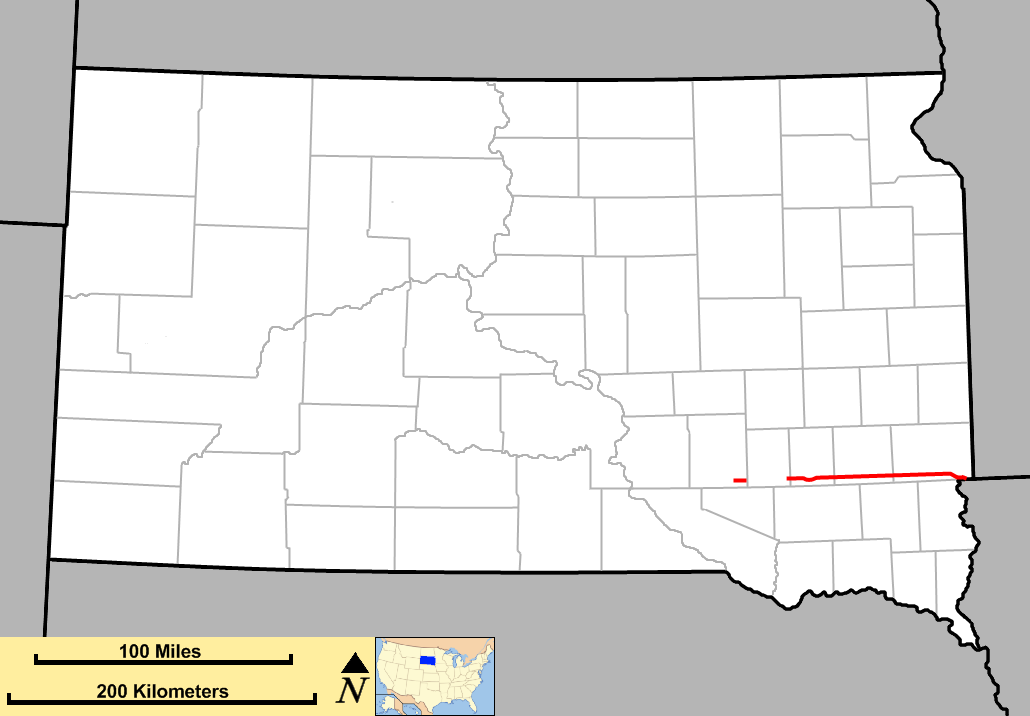
- Route of SD 42 (in red)

Route information
- Maintained by SDDOT
- Length: 71.973 mi (115.829 km)

Western segment
- Length: 5.870 mi (9.447 km)
- West end: US 281 in Aurora County
- East end: Aurora–Davison county line

Central segment
- Length: 59.231 mi (95.323 km)
- West end: SD 37 west of Ethan
- Major intersections: US 81 in McCook County
- East end: Sioux Falls

Eastern segment
- Length: 6.872 mi (11.059 km)
- West end: Six Mile Road in Sioux Falls
- East end: Iowa 9 west of Benclare

Location
- Country: United States
- State: South Dakota
- Counties: Aurora; Davison; Hanson; McCook; Minnehaha

Highway system
- South Dakota State Trunk Highway System; Interstate; US; State
← SD 41	→ SD 43

South Dakota Highway 42 (SD 42) is a segmented state highway in southeastern South Dakota, United States. The first segment is a six-mile-long (9.7 km) highway in Aurora County. The second and longest is 60 miles (97 km) long and connects Ethan and Sioux Falls. The final segment connects Sioux Falls to Iowa Highway 9 southeast of Rowena.

== Route description ==
The westernmost segment of SD 42 begins at a junction with U.S. Route 281 (US 281) and travels east through open farmland. This is the shortest of the three segments; it is only about six miles (9.7 km) long, and it ends as the roadway crosses from Aurora County into Davison County.

The central segment of the highway begins at an intersection with SD 37 in rural Davison County. It heads east and crosses the BNSF Railway. Just east of the railroad, the route passes through the town of Ethan, then enters Hanson County. About six miles (9.7 km) farther east, SD 42 bends slightly to the south and crosses the James River. The highway continues east through the flat prairie and enters McCook County.

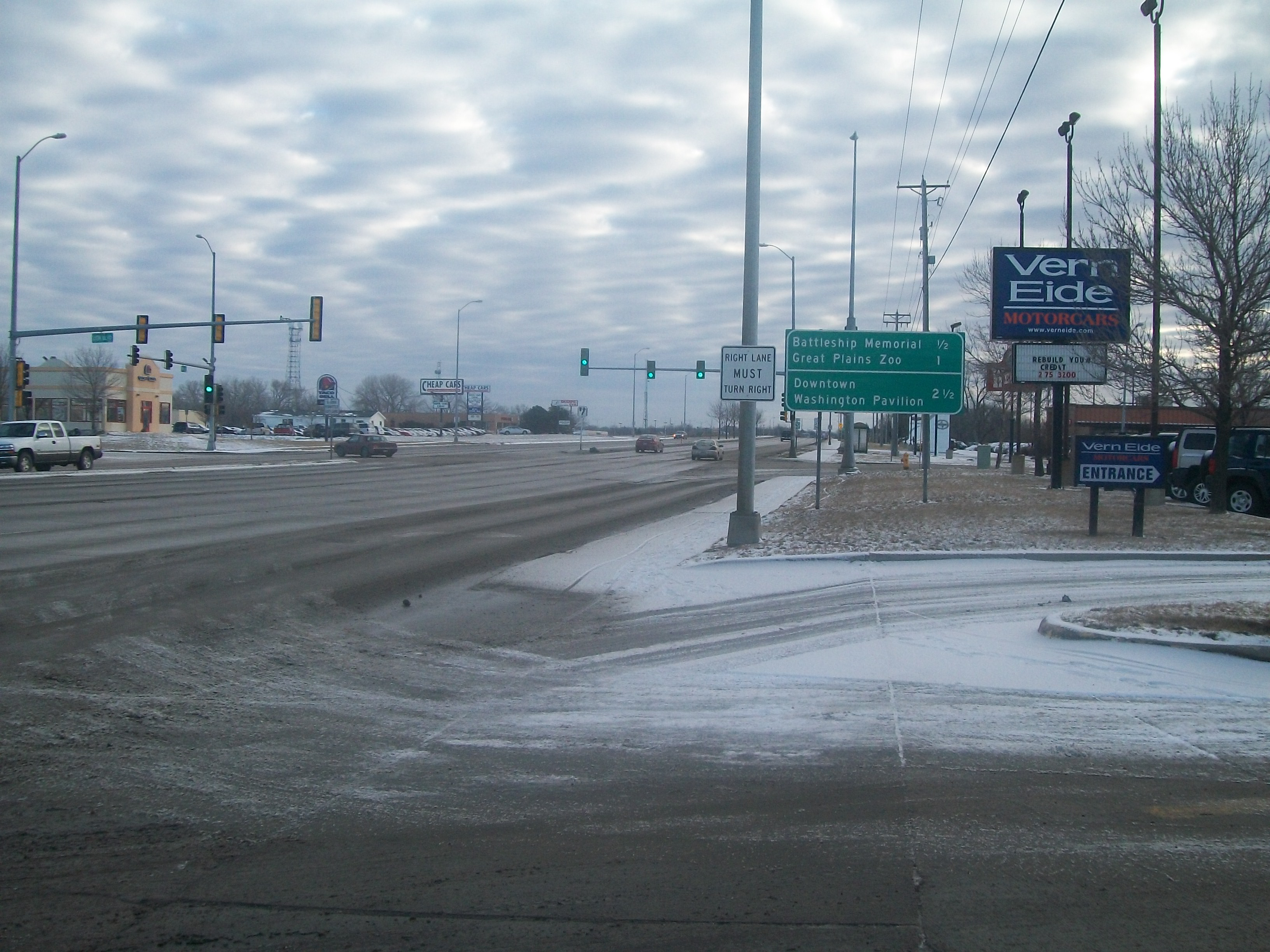
SD 42 in western Sioux Falls, February 2013

About five miles (8.0 km) east of the county line, the highway enters the city of Bridgewater. Here, it curves to the northeast and crosses another branch of the BNSF Railway before meeting the eastern terminus of SD 262. SD 42 then curves back to the east and leaves Bridgewater. It continues through flat farmland, intersecting US 81 and passing over the west fork of the Vermillion River. The route heads east about ten miles (16 km) before crossing the east fork of the Vermillion River, and then entering Minnehaha County.

In Minnehaha County, SD 42 intersects SD 19, and the two highways run east for about one mile (1.6 km) before SD 19 splits off to the north, and SD 42 continues east toward Sioux Falls. It intersects the northern terminus of SD 17 approximately three miles (4.8 km) west of the city. The central segment of SD 42 ends at Ellis Road near the Sioux Falls city limits.

The easternmost segment of SD 42 begins at Six Mile Road east of the city of Sioux Falls. It runs southeast, concurrent with SD 11 along Arrowhead Parkway. The two highways pass by a golf course and a park before crossing the Big Sioux River. East of the river, SD 11 turns to the north toward Brandon, and SD 42 curves to the east. The highway passes through the unincorporated community of Rowena before curving due south and crossing the Iowa state line. The route continues into Iowa as Iowa Highway 9.

== Major intersections ==
County	Location	mi	km	Destinations	Notes
Aurora		0.000	0.000	US 281 (388th Avenue) – Stickney	Road continues as 265th Street
Aurora–Davison county line		5.870	9.447	394th Avenue	Eastern end of state maintenance; road continues as 265th Street
Gap in route
Davison	Ethan	5.870	9.447	SD 37 (410th Avenue) – Parkston, Mitchell	Western end of state maintenance; SDDOT signs this as western terminus; road continues as 265th Street
Hanson	No major junctions				
McCook	Bridgewater	31.811	51.195	SD 262 west – Bridgewater	
McCook		37.100	59.707	US 81 (441st Avenue) – I-90, Freeman, Salem	
Minnehaha		51.089	82.220	SD 19 south (455th Avenue) – Parker	Western end of SD 19 concurrency
Minnehaha		52.102	83.850	SD 19 north (456th Avenue) – Humboldt	Eastern end of SD 19 concurrency
Minnehaha		62.101	99.942	SD 17 south (466th Avenue) – Lennox	
Minnehaha		65.101	104.770	CR 139 (Ellis Road) – Ellis, Tea	Eastern end of state maintenance; road continues as 12th Street
Minnehaha	Gap in route				
Minnehaha		65.101	104.770	CR 119 (Six Mile Road)	Western end of state maintenance; road continues as Arrowhead Parkway
Minnehaha		67.334	108.364	SD 11 north (481st Avenue) – Brandon	Eastern end of SD 11 concurrency
Minnehaha		71.973	115.829	Iowa 9 east / CR A10	Iowa state line; road continues as Iowa 9
1.000 mi = 1.609 km; 1.000 km = 0.621 mi: Concurrency terminus

== See also ==
- List of state highways in South Dakota
