= Millbrook Colony, South Dakota =

- Census-designated place
- Location within South Dakota Location within the United States
- Coordinates: 43°40′12″N 97°52′18″W
- Country: United States
- State: South Dakota
- County: Hanson

Area
  - Total: 0.24 sq mi (0.62 km^{2})
  - Land: 0.24 sq mi (0.61 km^{2})
  - Water: 0.0039 sq mi (0.01 km^{2})
- Elevation: 1,319 ft (402 m)

Population (2020)
  - Total: 98
  - Density: 418.4/sq mi (161.55/km^{2})
- Time zone: UTC-6 (Central (CST))
  - Summer (DST): UTC-5 (CDT)
- ZIP Code: 57301 (Mitchell)
- Area code: 605
- FIPS code: 46-42440
- GNIS feature ID: 2813031

Millbrook Colony is a Hutterite colony and census-designated place (CDP) in Hanson County, South Dakota, United States. The population was 98 at the 2020 census. It was first listed as a CDP prior to the 2020 census.

It is in the western part of the county, 7 miles (11 km) by road west-northwest of Alexandria, the county seat, and 10 miles (16 km) east-southeast of Mitchell.

== Demographics ==
Historical population
Census	Pop.	Note	%±
2020	98		—
U.S. Decennial Census
