= Old Rockport Hutterite Colony =

- U.S. National Register of Historic Places
- Location within South Dakota Location within the United States
- Nearest city: Alexandria, South Dakota
- Coordinates: 43°34′55″N 97°50′27″W
- Area: 8 acres (3.2 ha)
- Built: 1914
- MPS: Historic Hutterite Colonies TR
- NRHP reference No.: 82003929
- Added to NRHP: June 30, 1982

The Old Rockport Hutterite Colony, located on the James River in Hanson County, South Dakota near Alexandria, was listed on the National Register of Historic Places in 1982. The listing included nine contributing buildings.

== See also ==
- National Register of Historic Places listings in Hanson County, South Dakota
