= Bloom Site =

- U.S. National Register of Historic Places
- U.S. National Historic Landmark
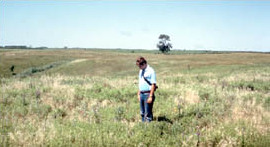
- Man standing at the site
- Location: Address restricted
- Nearest city: Bloom, South Dakota
- NRHP reference No.: 66000714

Significant dates
- Added to NRHP: October 15, 1966
- Designated NHL: July 19, 1964

The Bloom Site, designated by the Smithsonian trinomial 39HS1, is an archaeological site in Hanson County, South Dakota. It was declared a National Historic Landmark in 1964.

The site is located in the watershed of the James River. It contains the remains of a prehistoric fortified site, which was last inhabited about 1000 CE. Archaeologists have assigned it to the Lower James phase or Initial Middle Missouri phase of the Middle Missouri tradition. The site is one of four sites that form part of this phase that exhibit fairly intensive usage patterns, and differ in their ceramics from surrounding sites. The region was largely abandoned about 1300, in part due to the relatively poor quality of the land, which contributed to a sparse settlement pattern at the time. Finds at the site include the remains of blue-winged teal.

At the time of the landmark designation in 1964, it was stated:

A well-preserved example of a prehistoric fortified Over Focus Indian site (c. 1000), the ancestors of the Mandan Indians may have lived here. About 25 depressions mark the locations of rectangular houses. Prior to their destruction by cultivation, some 50 burial mounds, ranging up to 200 feet in diameter and from 3 to 10 feet high, also marked the site.

== See also ==
- List of National Historic Landmarks in South Dakota
- National Register of Historic Places listings in Hanson County, South Dakota
