= Rosedale Colony, South Dakota =

- Census-designated place
- Location within South Dakota Location within the United States
- Coordinates: 43°37′30″N 97°52′26″W
- Country: United States
- State: South Dakota
- County: Hanson

Area
  - Total: 0.22 sq mi (0.58 km^{2})
  - Land: 0.22 sq mi (0.58 km^{2})
  - Water: 0 sq mi (0.00 km^{2})
- Elevation: 1,247 ft (380 m)

Population (2020)
  - Total: 0
  - Density: 0/sq mi (0/km^{2})
- Time zone: UTC-6 (Central (CST))
  - Summer (DST): UTC-5 (CDT)
- ZIP Codes: 57311 (Alexandria); 57301 (Mitchell)
- Area code: 605
- FIPS code: 46-56140
- GNIS feature ID: 2807108

Rosedale Colony is a Hutterite colony and census-designated place (CDP) in Hanson County, South Dakota, United States. The population was 0 at the 2020 census. It was first listed as a CDP prior to the 2020 census.

It is in the western part of the county, on the southwest side of the James River. It is 7 miles (11 km) by road west-southwest of Alexandria, the county seat, and 14 miles (23 km) southeast of Mitchell.

== Demographics ==
Historical population
Census	Pop.	Note	%±
2020	0		—
U.S. Decennial Census
