= KUQL =

Radio station in Ethan, South Dakota

- Ethan, South Dakota; United States
- Broadcast area: Mitchell micropolitan area
- Frequency: 98.3 MHz (HD Radio)
- Branding: Kool 98

Programming
- Format: Classic hits
- Affiliations: Premiere Networks

Ownership
- Owner: Saga Communications; (Saga Communications of South Dakota, LLC)
- Sister stations: KMIT

History
- First air date: 1998 (as KGGK)
- Former call signs: KZZP (1995–1996, CP); KGGK (1996–2001)

Technical information
- Licensing authority: FCC
- Facility ID: 42113
- Class: C1
- ERP: 100,000 watts
- HAAT: 273 meters (896 ft)
- Transmitter coordinates: 43°45′33″N 98°24′44″W

Links
- Public license information: Public file; LMS
- Webcast: Listen Live
- Website: kool98.com

KUQL (98.3 FM, "Kool 98") is a radio station licensed to Ethan, South Dakota, United States, and serving the Mitchell micropolitan area. The station is owned by Saga Communications and licensed to Saga Communications of South Dakota, LLC. It airs a classic hits music format.

The station was assigned the KUQL call letters by the Federal Communications Commission on July 11, 2001.
