= KMIT =

KMIT may refer to:

- The ICAO airport code for Shafter Airport in Shafter, California, United States
- KMIT (FM), a radio station (105.9 FM) licensed to Mitchell, South Dakota, United States
- Michael Kmit, a Ukrainian-Australian painter
- National Kinmen Institute of Technology, a national university located in Kinmen, Taiwan
