= Fort James =

Fort James may refer to:

== Places ==
- Fort James (South Dakota), a historic fort (built in 1865 by soldiers sent to protect settlers) which is on the National Register of Historic Places listings in South Dakota (39HS48)
- Fort James (Ghana) in Accra
- Fort James (Tobago)
- Fort James, Antigua and Barbuda
- Fort James, a former fort on Burrow Island in Gosport
- Fort James, located on James Island (Gambia)
- Fort Amsterdam, New York City, originally named Fort James
- Fort Berthold, North Dakota, originally named Fort James, a fur trading post renamed in 1846
- Fort Severn First Nation, originally named Fort James, a fur-trading post built by Hudson's Bay Company in 1689, in Northern Ontario, Canada
- James Fort, a Jamestown Rediscovery site, built in 1607 on the site of the British colony later renamed Jamestowne
- Fort James, an English fort in Port Royal, Jamaica, that was destroyed in the 1692 Jamaica earthquake, sinking into the sea.
- Fort James (HBC vessel), operated by the HBC from 1927-1938, see Hudson's Bay Company vessels

== Other uses ==
- Fort James Corporation, a defunct paper company acquired by Georgia-Pacific
