= Benclare, South Dakota =

Unincorporated community in South Dakota, US

Benclare is an unincorporated community in the extreme southeastern corner of Minnehaha County, South Dakota, United States.

== Geography ==
Benclare is located at 43°30′20″N 96°28′44″W. Benclare sits 1.5 miles (2.4 km) west of the Minnesota border and 0.5 miles (0.80 km) north of the border with Iowa. Benclare is also located 1 mile (1.6 km) east of South Dakota Highway 42.

== History ==
Benclare was founded on September 24, 1888, by a New York native, Benjamin Richards for his two sons Benjamin and Clarence, hence Benclare.
