= Farmer, South Dakota =

- Town
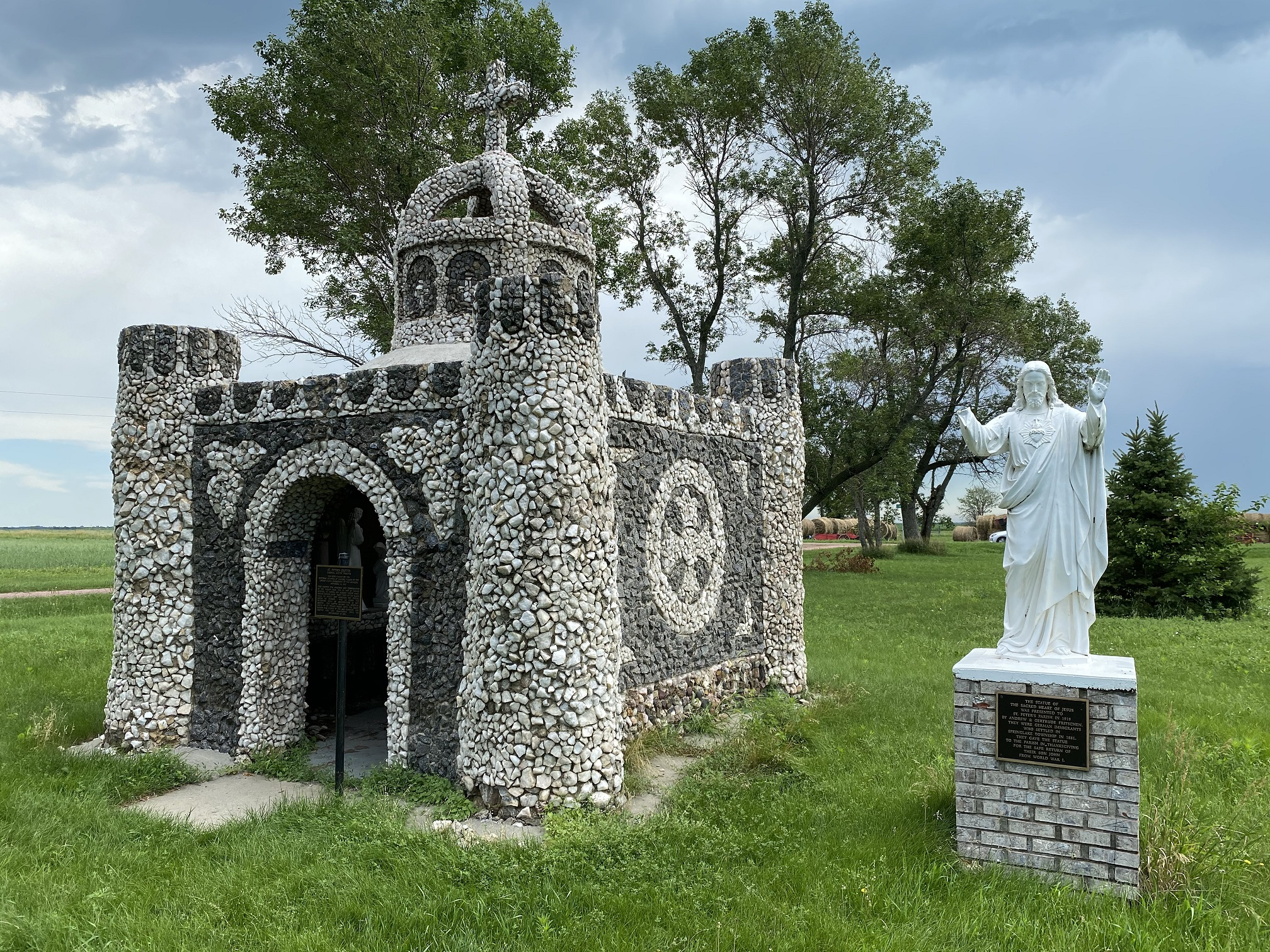
- Saint Peter's Grotto

- Location in Hanson County and the state of South Dakota
- Coordinates: 43°43′31″N 97°41′21″W
- Country: United States
- State: South Dakota
- County: Hanson
- Incorporated: 1920

Area
  - Total: 0.085 sq mi (0.22 km^{2})
  - Land: 0.085 sq mi (0.22 km^{2})
  - Water: 0 sq mi (0.00 km^{2})
- Elevation: 1,394 ft (425 m)

Population (2020)
  - Total: 15
  - Density: 180.7/sq mi (69.75/km^{2})
- Time zone: UTC-6 (Central (CST))
  - Summer (DST): UTC-5 (CDT)
- ZIP code: 57311
- Area code: 605
- FIPS code: 46-21060
- GNIS feature ID: 1267389

Farmer is a town in Hanson County, South Dakota, United States. It is part of the Mitchell, South Dakota Micropolitan Statistical Area. The population was 15 at the 2020 census.

== History ==
A post office called Farmer was established in 1890, and remained in operation until it was discontinued in 1992. The town was incorporated in 1920. A majority of the early settlers being farmers caused the name to be selected. Farmer is home to Saint Peter's Grotto. The grotto was built between 1926 and 1933 by Fr. Peter N. Scheier and was placed on the National Register of Historic Places in 2001.

== Geography ==
According to the United States Census Bureau, the town has a total area of 0.08 square miles (0.21 km^{2}), all land.

== Demographics ==
Historical population
Census	Pop.	Note	%±
1930	132		—
1940	130		−1.5%
1950	114		−12.3%
1960	95		−16.7%
1970	58		−38.9%
1980	27		−53.4%
1990	23		−14.8%
2000	18		−21.7%
2010	10		−44.4%
2020	15		50.0%
U.S. Decennial Census

=== 2010 census ===
As of the census of 2010, there were 10 people, 4 households, and 3 families residing in the town. The population density was 125.0 inhabitants per square mile (48.3/km^{2}). There were 9 housing units at an average density of 112.5 per square mile (43.4/km^{2}). The racial makeup of the town was 100.0% White.

There were 4 households, of which 50.0% had children under the age of 18 living with them, 75.0% were married couples living together, and 25.0% were non-families. 25.0% of all households were made up of individuals. The average household size was 2.50 and the average family size was 3.00.

The median age in the town was 46 years. 30% of residents were under the age of 18; 0.0% were between the ages of 18 and 24; 20% were from 25 to 44; 30% were from 45 to 64; and 20% were 65 years of age or older. The gender makeup of the town was 50.0% male and 50.0% female.

=== 2000 census ===
As of the census of 2000, there were 18 people, 7 households, and 4 families residing in the town. The population density was 282.5 inhabitants per square mile (109.1/km^{2}). There were 10 housing units at an average density of 156.9 per square mile (60.6/km^{2}). The racial makeup of the town was 94.44% White and 5.56% Native American.

There were 7 households, out of which 28.6% had children under the age of 18 living with them, 57.1% were married couples living together, 14.3% had a female householder with no husband present, and 28.6% were non-families. 28.6% of all households were made up of individuals, and 14.3% had someone living alone who was 65 years of age or older. The average household size was 2.57 and the average family size was 3.20.

In the town, the population was spread out, with 33.3% under the age of 18, 27.8% from 25 to 44, 22.2% from 45 to 64, and 16.7% who were 65 years of age or older. The median age was 39 years. For every 100 females, there were 100.0 males. For every 100 females age 18 and over, there were 100.0 males.

The median income for a household in the town was $14,375, and the median income for a family was $55,417. Males had a median income of $26,250 versus $21,250 for females. The per capita income for the town was $10,976. None of the population or families were below the poverty line.
