= KMIT (FM) =

Radio station in Mitchell, South Dakota

- Mitchell, South Dakota; United States
- Broadcast area: Mitchell micropolitan area
- Frequency: 105.9 MHz (HD Radio)
- Branding: Hot Country 105.9

Programming
- Format: Country
- Subchannels: HD2: More 95.5 (Soft adult contemporary); HD3: Pure Oldies 103.5 (Oldies)
- Affiliations: Premiere Networks; Westwood One

Ownership
- Owner: Saga Communications; (Saga Communications of South Dakota, LLC)
- Sister stations: KUQL

History
- First air date: 1975
- Call sign meaning: K MITchell

Technical information
- Licensing authority: FCC
- Facility ID: 43239
- Class: C1
- ERP: 100,000 watts
- HAAT: 199 meters (653 ft)
- Transmitter coordinates: 43°44′16″N 98°14′39″W
- Translators: HD2: 95.5 K238BA (Mitchell); HD3: 103.5 K278BJ (Mitchell)

Links
- Public license information: Public file; LMS
- Webcast: Listen Live; Listen Live (HD2); Listen Live (HD3)
- Website: kmit.com more955.com (HD2) pureoldies1035.com (HD3)

KMIT (105.9 MHz, "Hot Country 105.9") is an FM radio station in Mitchell, South Dakota, United States. The station is owned by Saga Communications of South Dakota, LLC. It airs a country music format.

The station was assigned the KMIT call letters by the Federal Communications Commission.

== Ownership ==
In April 2001, Saga Communications Inc. reached a deal to acquire KMIT and KGGK (now known as KUQL) from Mitchell Broadcasting Ltd. for a reported $4.05 million.

Logo under previous slogan

== Honors ==
In February 2005, KMIT sports director Tim Smith and John Papendick of the Aberdeen American News were named sportscaster and sportswriter of the year, respectively, in South Dakota.

== KMIT-HD2 ==
KMIT airs an adult contemporary format on its HD2 subchannel, branded as "More 95.5" (simulcast on translator K238BA 95.5 FM Mitchell).

== KMIT-HD3 ==
KMIT aired a sports format with programming from ESPN Radio on its HD3 subchannel, branded as "ESPN 103.5" (simulcast on translator K278BJ 103.5 FM Mitchell. On August 20, 2018, KMIT-HD3/K278BJ changed their format from sports to oldies, branded as "Pure Oldies 103.5".

== Translators ==
In addition to the main station, KMIT's HD2 & HD3 subchannels are relayed on the following translators:

Broadcast translator for KMIT-HD2
| Call sign | Frequency | City of license | FID | ERP (W) | FCC info |
|---|---|---|---|---|---|
| K238BA | 95.5 FM | Mitchell, South Dakota | 148217 | 250 | LMS |

Broadcast translator for KMIT-HD3
| Call sign | Frequency | City of license | FID | ERP (W) | FCC info |
|---|---|---|---|---|---|
| K278BJ | 103.5 FM | Mitchell, South Dakota | 142012 | 250 | LMS |
