= Turkey Ridge Creek =

Stream in South Dakota, U.S.

Coordinates: 43°06′27″N 96°59′06″W

Turkey Ridge Creek is a stream in the U.S. state of South Dakota.

Turkey Ridge Creek takes its name from nearby Turkey Ridge, an elevation noted for its population of wild turkeys.

== See also ==
- List of rivers of South Dakota
