= Henry Montgomery (American politician) =

American politician

Henry Warren Montgomery (June 16, 1858 – March 8, 1917) was a member of the South Dakota House of Representatives from 1903 to 1906.

Montgomery was born in Columbia County, Wisconsin and lived in Alexandria, South Dakota. He married Caroline Douglas (1860–1917), and they had seven children. He was a Democrat. He died on March 8, 1917.
