= Enemy Creek =

Stream in South Dakota, U.S.

Coordinates: 43°38′09″N 97°53′39″W

Enemy Creek is a 7.3-mile (11.7 km) stream in Davison County, South Dakota. It is located 4.5 miles (7.2 km) southeast of the city of Mitchell and drains into the James River basin.

Enemy Creek received its name from a nearby skirmish between two Native American tribes.

== See also ==
- List of rivers of South Dakota
