= Turkey Ridge, South Dakota =

Unincorporated community in South Dakota, U.S.

Coordinates: 43°14′37″N 97°16′46″W

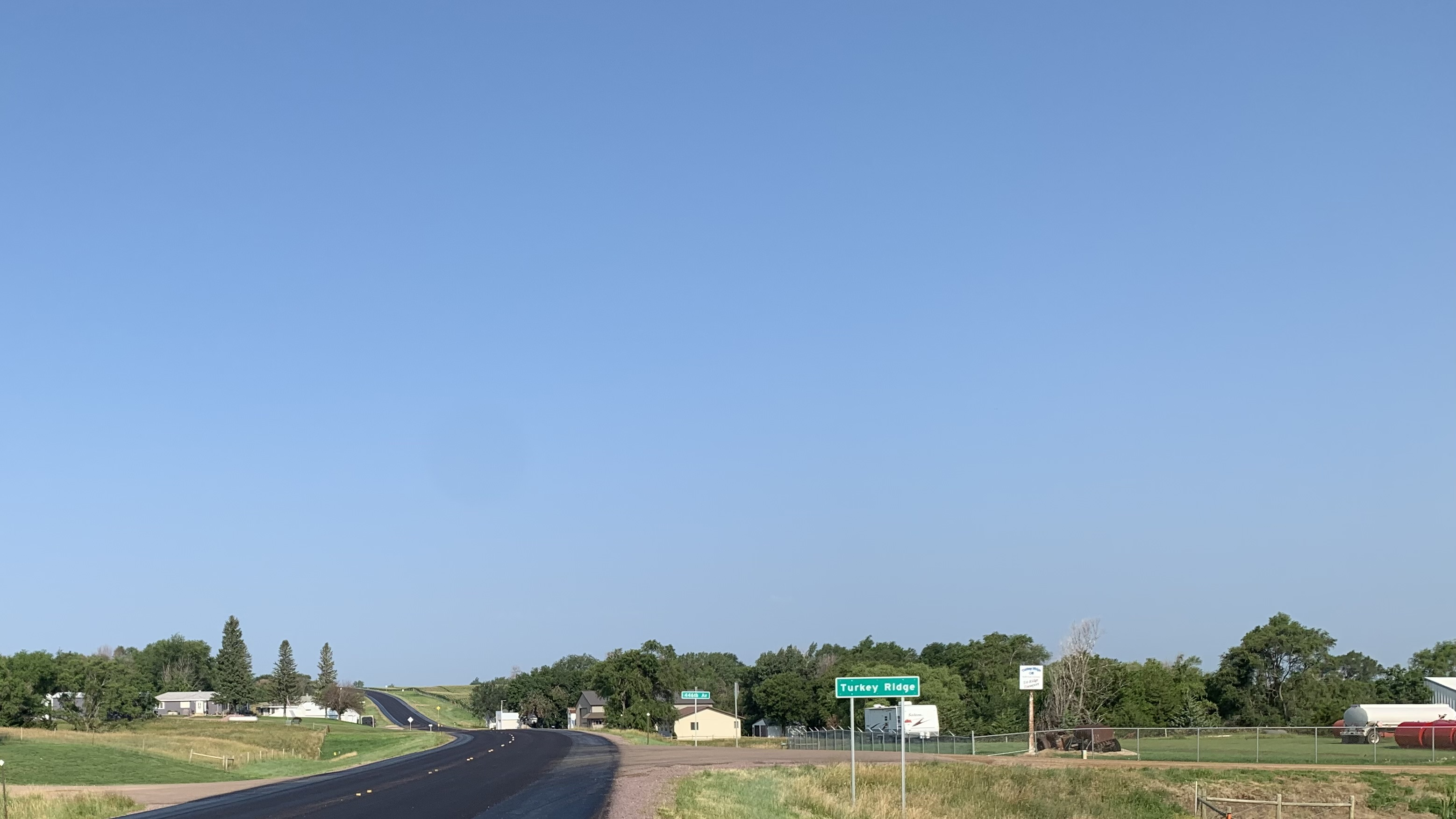
Turkey Ridge, South Dakota

Turkey Ridge is an unincorporated community in Turner County, in the U.S. state of South Dakota.

The community takes its name from nearby Turkey Ridge, an elevation noted for its population of wild turkeys.
