= Emery, South Dakota =

- City
- Location in Hanson County and the state of South Dakota
- Coordinates: 43°36′07″N 97°37′11″W
- Country: United States
- State: South Dakota
- County: Hanson
- Incorporated: 1917

Area
  - Total: 0.46 sq mi (1.18 km^{2})
  - Land: 0.46 sq mi (1.18 km^{2})
  - Water: 0 sq mi (0.00 km^{2})
- Elevation: 1,388 ft (423 m)

Population (2020)
  - Total: 484
  - Density: 1,059.1/sq mi (408.94/km^{2})
- Time zone: UTC-6 (Central (CST))
  - Summer (DST): UTC-5 (CDT)
- ZIP code: 57332
- Area code: 605
- FIPS code: 46-19420
- GNIS feature ID: 1267380
- Website: www.cityofemerysd.com

Emery is a city in Hanson County, South Dakota, United States. It is part of the Mitchell, South Dakota Micropolitan Statistical Area. The population was 484 at the 2020 census.

== History ==
The town was named for Sloan Miller (S.M.) Emery who filed a claim for the land that included the original town site in 1879. There was first settlement in the 1880s.

== School ==
Emery has a K-12 school and was constructed in 1958, with additions in 1983, 1999, and 2016.

As with many small towns, high school athletics is a focus for the community. The boys basketball and football teams both have won state championships in their divisions. The football team, Bridgewater-Emery/Ethan Seahawks, has won a combined 7 state championships (2001, 2003, 2007, 2010, 2011 and 2013 in 9-Man, 2019 in 11-man) and been runner-up 5 times (1993 and 2009 in 9-Man, 2017, 2018 and 2020 in 11-Man. The football team has been coached by Jeff VanLeur since 1980. The boys basketball team won in 1950, 1973 and 2017.

As of fall of 2010, the Emery school consolidated with Bridgewater, SD. The Emery and Bridgewater basketball, volleyball, track and golf teams continued their co-op which started in 2005. The football co-op with Ethan, has continued, adding Bridgewater.

== Community amenities ==
Gene's Bar in Emery, 1980

Emery has a park facility which includes a swimming pool, baseball field, softball field, tennis court, basketball court & sand volleyball court.

The city is also home to the Dimock-Emery Raptors amateur baseball team which plays in the South Dakota Amateur Baseball Association. The Raptors won the city's first ever amateur baseball championship in 2010.

== Geography ==
According to the United States Census Bureau, the city has a total area of 0.45 square miles (1.17 km^{2}), all land.

== Demographics ==
Historical population
Census	Pop.	Note	%±
1900	247		—
1910	446		80.6%
1920	600		34.5%
1930	542		−9.7%
1940	482		−11.1%
1950	480		−0.4%
1960	502		4.6%
1970	452		−10.0%
1980	399		−11.7%
1990	417		4.5%
2000	439		5.3%
2010	447		1.8%
2020	484		8.3%
U.S. Decennial Census

=== 2020 census ===
As of the 2020 census, Emery had a population of 484. The median age was 36.1 years. 30.4% of residents were under the age of 18 and 16.5% of residents were 65 years of age or older. For every 100 females there were 121.0 males, and for every 100 females age 18 and over there were 101.8 males age 18 and over.

0.0% of residents lived in urban areas, while 100.0% lived in rural areas.

There were 193 households in Emery, of which 34.2% had children under the age of 18 living in them. Of all households, 52.3% were married-couple households, 21.2% were households with a male householder and no spouse or partner present, and 22.3% were households with a female householder and no spouse or partner present. About 35.2% of all households were made up of individuals and 19.2% had someone living alone who was 65 years of age or older.

There were 210 housing units, of which 8.1% were vacant. The homeowner vacancy rate was 1.3% and the rental vacancy rate was 9.8%.

Racial composition as of the 2020 census
Race	Number	Percent
White	463	95.7%
Black or African American	0	0.0%
American Indian and Alaska Native	0	0.0%
Asian	0	0.0%
Native Hawaiian and Other Pacific Islander	2	0.4%
Some other race	2	0.4%
Two or more races	17	3.5%
Hispanic or Latino (of any race)	7	1.4%

=== 2010 census ===
As of the census of 2010, there were 447 people, 191 households, and 116 families residing in the city. The population density was 993.3 inhabitants per square mile (383.5/km^{2}). There were 210 housing units at an average density of 466.7 per square mile (180.2/km^{2}). The racial makeup of the city was 98.4% White, 0.2% Native American, 0.4% Asian, and 0.9% from two or more races.

There were 191 households, of which 28.8% had children under the age of 18 living with them, 51.8% were married couples living together, 5.2% had a female householder with no husband present, 3.7% had a male householder with no wife present, and 39.3% were non-families. 35.1% of all households were made up of individuals, and 15.2% had someone living alone who was 65 years of age or older. The average household size was 2.34 and the average family size was 3.09.

The median age in the city was 37.9 years. 29.1% of residents were under the age of 18; 3.3% were between the ages of 18 and 24; 26.4% were from 25 to 44; 21.7% were from 45 to 64; and 19.5% were 65 years of age or older. The gender makeup of the city was 49.9% male and 50.1% female.

=== 2000 census ===
As of the census of 2000, there were 439 people, 195 households, and 123 families residing in the city. The population density was 1,255.4 inhabitants per square mile (484.7/km^{2}). There were 204 housing units at an average density of 583.4 per square mile (225.3/km^{2}). The racial makeup of the city was 100.00% White.

There were 195 households, out of which 27.7% had children under the age of 18 living with them, 55.9% were married couples living together, 5.6% had a female householder with no husband present, and 36.9% were non-families. 34.9% of all households were made up of individuals, and 25.6% had someone living alone who was 65 years of age or older. The average household size was 2.25 and the average family size was 2.95.

In the city, the population was spread out, with 26.4% under the age of 18, 4.8% from 18 to 24, 23.5% from 25 to 44, 18.5% from 45 to 64, and 26.9% who were 65 years of age or older. The median age was 42 years. For every 100 females, there were 85.2 males. For every 100 females age 18 and over, there were 81.5 males.

The median income for a household in the city was $28,958, and the median income for a family was $35,313. Males had a median income of $27,875 versus $16,094 for females. The per capita income for the city was $17,324. About 3.8% of families and 5.2% of the population were below the poverty line, including none of those under age 18 and 16.9% of those age 65 or over.

== Notable people ==
- Thomas H. Werdel, California politician
- Tyler Kjetland, American football offensive lineman

== See also ==
- List of cities in South Dakota
