= Fort James (South Dakota) =

Cavalry fort in South Dakota

Coordinates: 43°41′57.61″N 97°58′18.84″W

- Hanson County, on the James River.
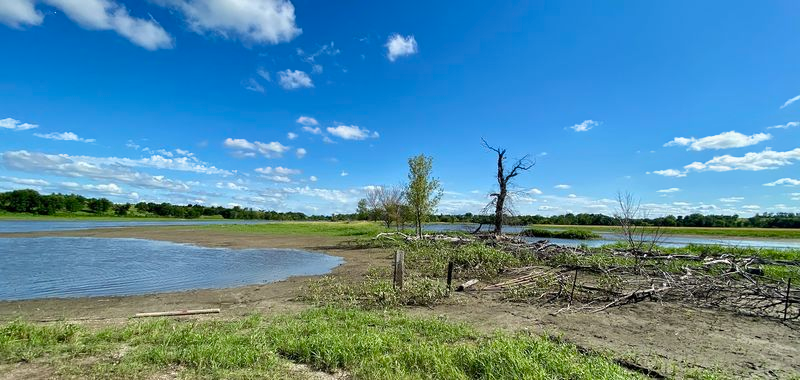
- Looking downstream from Fort James

Site information
- Controlled by: Private owner

Site history
- Built: 1865
- In use: 1865-1867
- Materials: stone & wood

Garrison information
- Garrison: 6th Iowa Volunteer Cavalry
- Fort James (39HS48)
- U.S. National Register of Historic Places
- Area: 1 acre (0.40 ha)
- NRHP reference No.: 84003290
- Added to NRHP: March 15, 1984

Fort James was a cavalry fort built in 1866 in Dakota Territory. It was soon decommissioned and its site now is in the state of South Dakota. It was listed on the National Register of Historic Places in 1984.

== History ==
In 1835 and 1857, the United States signed treaties with the native nations in western Minnesota and northern Iowa that obligated the federal government to provide food to these peoples. However the Civil War prevented it from fulfilling its these obligations and corrupt Indian agents and traders skimmed off what little came into the reservations. Starving, a handful of Dakota warriors raided farms for eggs and other supplies, killing 5 settlers. This broke Dakota inertia, bringing young warriors out to begin raiding along the Minnesota River Valley. Although no fighting took place in Dakota Territory, people of all ethnicities fled into it for refuge. In 1863 disturbances near Yankton, South Dakota, alarmed settlers and the territorial authorities assigned units of soldiers to scout and patrol the area.

As a result, Fort James was founded on the west bank of the James River at its confluence with Firesteel Creek. It was first established in September 1865 by Captain Benjamin King, 6th Iowa Cavalry, as Fort La Roche or Fort Des Roche, on the orders of Brigadier General Alfred Sully. Built as protection from outbreaks of Native American aggression, its detachments of troops were there to make prospective settlers feel safe. The soldiers were the first non-Sioux to settle in the county and non-Sioux civilian settlement didn't begin until 1872, six years after the fort was abandoned. It was also known as Camp Near Firesteel Creek and only became known as Fort James after its decommissioning.

== The fate of the fort ==
Its log and stone quadrangle served to protect stagecoaches and settlers for roughly a year before it was decommissioned on October 6, 1866. Settlers who came later scavenged most of the fort's materials for their own constructions. In 1872 a reporter from the Yankton Press noted the massive walls of the abandoned fort still standing as he travelled up the James River. When Hanson County was organized, old Fort James became the first temporary county seat and was known as Rockport.

== Television Coverage ==
Fort James was the subject of an episode of the PBS TV archaeology series Time Team America.
