= Elce Creek =

Stream in Turner County, South Dakota, U.S.

Elce Creek is a stream in Turner County, South Dakota. It is a tributary of the Vermillion River. Elce Creek is named after T. C. Elce, a pioneer settler. Elce Creek is at an elevation of 1266 feet (386 meters) with the coordinates of 43.3597° N, 97.0320° W.

== See also ==
- List of rivers of South Dakota
