= Fulton, South Dakota =

- Town
- Location in Hanson County and the state of South Dakota
- Coordinates: 43°43′44″N 97°49′21″W
- Country: United States
- State: South Dakota
- County: Hanson

Area
  - Total: 0.85 sq mi (2.21 km^{2})
  - Land: 0.85 sq mi (2.21 km^{2})
  - Water: 0 sq mi (0.00 km^{2})
- Elevation: 1,332 ft (406 m)

Population (2020)
  - Total: 87
  - Density: 101.9/sq mi (39.34/km^{2})
- Time zone: UTC-6 (Central (CST))
  - Summer (DST): UTC-5 (CDT)
- ZIP code: 57340
- Area code: 605
- FIPS code: 46-23220
- GNIS feature ID: 1267398

Fulton is a town in Hanson County, South Dakota, United States. It is part of the Mitchell, South Dakota Micropolitan Statistical Area. The population was 87 at the 2020 census.

== History ==
The town was laid out in 1887. Some say that the town was named for Robert Fulton, inventor of the first commercially successful steamboat, while others believe the town has the name of a railroad employee. A post office has been in operation in Fulton since 1887.

== Geography ==
According to the United States Census Bureau, the town has a total area of 0.85 square miles (2.20 km^{2}), all land.

== Demographics ==
Historical population
| Census | Pop. | Note | %± |
|---|---|---|---|
| 1920 | 214 | | — |
| 1930 | 171 | | −20.1% |
| 1940 | 168 | | −1.8% |
| 1950 | 139 | | −17.3% |
| 1960 | 135 | | −2.9% |
| 1970 | 101 | | −25.2% |
| 1980 | 108 | | 6.9% |
| 1990 | 70 | | −35.2% |
| 2000 | 86 | | 22.9% |
| 2010 | 91 | | 5.8% |
| 2020 | 87 | | −4.4% |
U.S. Decennial Census

=== 2010 census ===
As of the census of 2010, there were 91 people, 38 households, and 26 families residing in the town. The population density was 107.1 inhabitants per square mile (41.4/km^{2}). There were 44 housing units at an average density of 51.8 per square mile (20.0/km^{2}). The racial makeup of the town was 100.0% White.

There were 38 households, of which 28.9% had children under the age of 18 living with them, 60.5% were married couples living together, 2.6% had a female householder with no husband present, 5.3% had a male householder with no wife present, and 31.6% were non-families. 28.9% of all households were made up of individuals, and 5.3% had someone living alone who was 65 years of age or older. The average household size was 2.39 and the average family size was 2.77.

The median age in the town was 42.8 years. 27.5% of residents were under the age of 18; 3.3% were between the ages of 18 and 24; 20.9% were from 25 to 44; 24.2% were from 45 to 64; and 24.2% were 65 years of age or older. The gender makeup of the town was 58.2% male and 41.8% female.

=== 2000 census ===
As of the census of 2000, there were 86 people, 38 households, and 29 families residing in the town. The population density was 100.7 inhabitants per square mile (38.9/km^{2}). There were 41 housing units at an average density of 48.0 per square mile (18.5/km^{2}). The racial makeup of the town was 100.00% White.

There were 38 households, out of which 23.7% had children under the age of 18 living with them, 76.3% were married couples living together, 2.6% had a female householder with no husband present, and 21.1% were non-families. 21.1% of all households were made up of individuals, and 7.9% had someone living alone who was 65 years of age or older. The average household size was 2.26 and the average family size was 2.60.

In the town, the population was spread out, with 17.4% under the age of 18, 3.5% from 18 to 24, 25.6% from 25 to 44, 29.1% from 45 to 64, and 24.4% who were 65 years of age or older. The median age was 48 years. For every 100 females, there were 100.0 males. For every 100 females age 18 and over, there were 82.1 males.

The median income for a household in the town was $26,875, and the median income for a family was $30,000. Males had a median income of $26,875 versus $22,813 for females. The per capita income for the town was $13,062. There were 15.6% of families and 24.7% of the population living below the poverty line, including 77.8% of under eighteens and 10.0% of those over 64.
