= Mitchell micropolitan area, South Dakota =

Mitchell Micropolitan Area
- Micropolitan Statistical Area
- Mitchell, SD Micropolitan Statistical Area
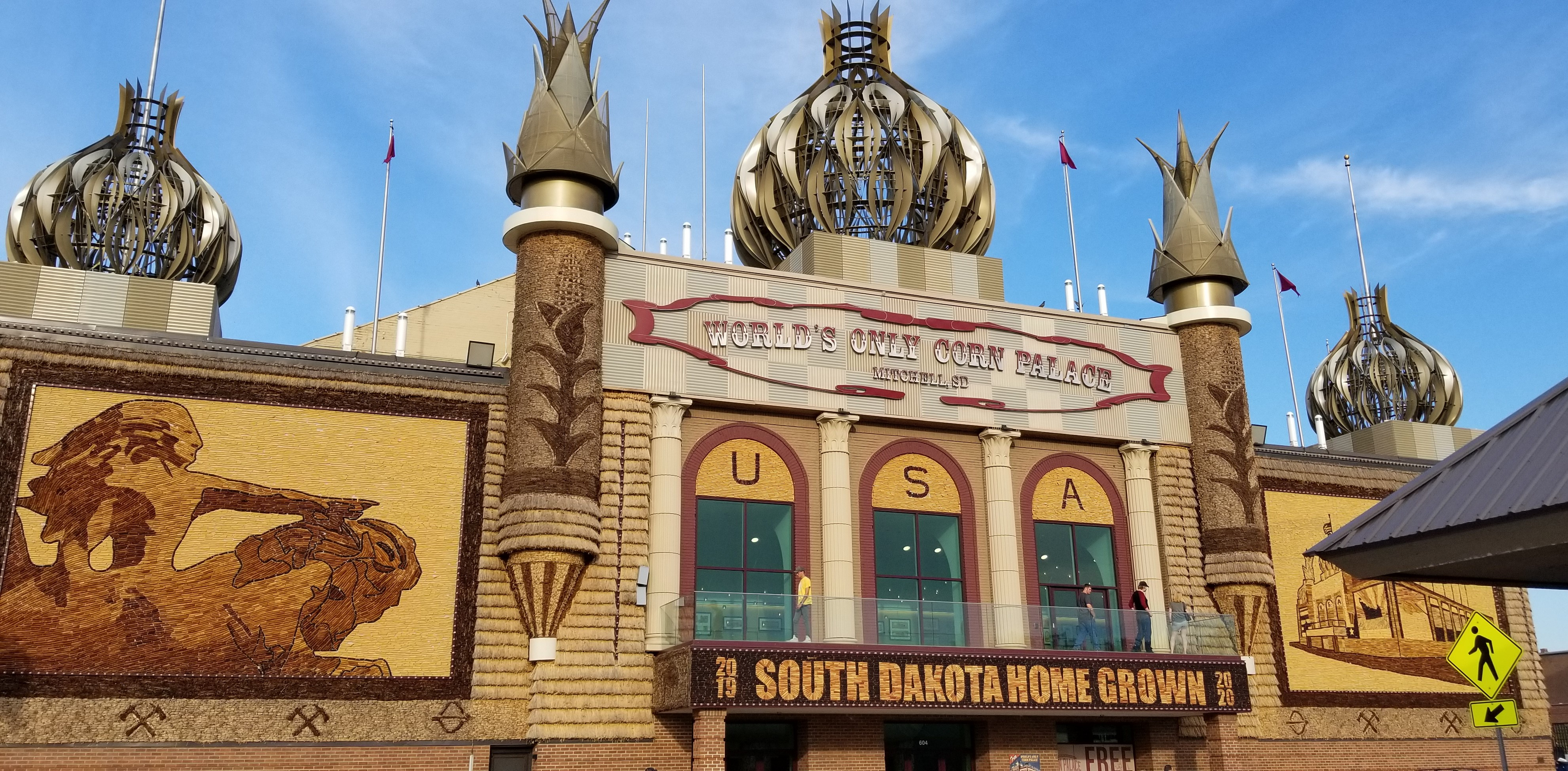
- The World's Only Corn Palace "South Dakota Home Grown" Theme (2020)
Interactive Map of Mitchell, SD μSA
City of Mitchell
Mitchell, SD μSA
- Country: United States
- State: South Dakota
- Largest city: Mitchell
- Time zone: UTC−6 (CST)
  - Summer (DST): UTC−5 (CDT)

The Mitchell Micropolitan Statistical Area, as defined by the United States Census Bureau, is an area consisting of two counties in South Dakota, anchored by the city of Mitchell. As of the 2000 census, the μSA had a population of 21,880 (though a July 1, 2009 estimate placed the population at 22,482).

== Counties ==
- Davison
- Hanson
- Sanborn

== Communities ==
- Cities
  - Alexandria
  - Emery
  - Mitchell (Principal city)
  - Mount Vernon
- Towns
  - Ethan
  - Farmer
  - Fulton
- Census-designated places
  - Loomis
- Unincorporated places
  - Epiphany

== Demographics ==
As of the census of 2000, there were 21,880 people, 8,700 households, and 5,618 families residing within the μSA. The racial makeup of the μSA was 96.70% White, 0.23% African American, 1.71% Native American, 0.38% Asian, 0.02% Pacific Islander, 0.26% from other races, and 0.69% from two or more races. Hispanic or Latino of any race were 0.61% of the population.

The median income for a household in the μSA was $33,263, and the median income for a family was $41,929. Males had a median income of $28,969 versus $20,578 for females. The per capita income for the μSA was $16,329.

== See also ==
- South Dakota census statistical areas
