= Epiphany, South Dakota =

Epiphany
- Unincorporated community
- Interactive map of Epiphany
- Location within South Dakota
- Coordinates: 43°50′57″N 97°39′42″W
- Country: United States
- State: South Dakota
- Counties: Hanson and Miner
- Elevation: 1,368 ft (417 m)

Epiphany is an unincorporated community straddling the border between Hanson County and Miner County in the U.S. state of South Dakota. It is located along South Dakota Highway 25.

== History ==
Epiphany was established between 1889 and 1892. The settlement was named by Bishop Martin Marty, and its post office was established in July 1892.

In 1893 Father William Kroeger, a Catholic priest and medical doctor, arrived in Epiphany, where he established a medical "sanitarium", making medicines (which he sold by mail order) and treating a variety of diseases. Many people came from across the United States and foreign countries to be cured of different ailments, with perhaps 300–400 staying in Epiphany at the business's height. There was a bus line that meet trains at Canova. William Kroeger also established the first electric power plant in Epiphany, an artificial ice plant, a bank of which he was the sole owner, and a factory for making paper boxes.
