= Ethan, South Dakota =

- Town
- Motto: Where friends and family come together
- Location in Davison County and the state of South Dakota
- Coordinates: 43°32′47″N 97°59′00″W
- Country: United States
- State: South Dakota
- County: Davison
- Platted: 1883

Area
  - Total: 0.25 sq mi (0.66 km^{2})
  - Land: 0.25 sq mi (0.66 km^{2})
  - Water: 0 sq mi (0.00 km^{2})
- Elevation: 1,345 ft (410 m)

Population (2020)
  - Total: 365
  - Density: 1,431.1/sq mi (552.55/km^{2})
- Time zone: UTC-6 (Central (CST))
  - Summer (DST): UTC-5 (CDT)
- ZIP code: 57334
- Area code: 605
- FIPS code: 46-20060
- GNIS feature ID: 1267383
- Website: http://www.ethansd.com http://www.ethanvoice.com

Ethan is a town in Davison County, South Dakota, United States. It is part of the Mitchell, South Dakota Micropolitan Statistical Area. The population was 365 at the 2020 census. Ethan is located 10 miles south of Mitchell.

== Geography ==
According to the United States Census Bureau, the town has a total area of 0.25 square miles (0.65 km^{2}), all land.

== History ==
Ethan was laid out in 1883, and named in honor of Ethan Allen, a patriot in the Revolutionary War.

== Demographics ==
Historical population
Census	Pop.	Note	%±
1910	312		—
1920	416		33.3%
1930	369		−11.3%
1940	324		−12.2%
1950	319		−1.5%
1960	297		−6.9%
1970	309		4.0%
1980	351		13.6%
1990	312		−11.1%
2000	330		5.8%
2010	331		0.3%
2020	365		10.3%
U.S. Decennial Census

=== 2010 census ===
As of the census of 2010, there were 331 people, 130 households, and 92 families residing in the town. The population density was 1,324.0 inhabitants per square mile (511.2/km^{2}). There were 142 housing units at an average density of 568.0 per square mile (219.3/km^{2}). The racial makeup of the town was 97.9% White, 1.2% Native American, and 0.9% from two or more races. Hispanic or Latino of any race were 0.3% of the population.

There were 130 households, of which 36.2% had children under the age of 18 living with them, 55.4% were married couples living together, 11.5% had a female householder with no husband present, 3.8% had a male householder with no wife present, and 29.2% were non-families. 24.6% of all households were made up of individuals, and 10% had someone living alone who was 65 years of age or older. The average household size was 2.55 and the average family size was 3.01.

The median age in the town was 33.9 years. 28.4% of residents were under the age of 18; 8.5% were between the ages of 18 and 24; 29.1% were from 25 to 44; 19.8% were from 45 to 64; and 14.2% were 65 years of age or older. The gender makeup of the town was 50.2% male and 49.8% female.

=== 2000 census ===
As of the census of 2000, there were 330 people, 129 households, and 91 families residing in the town. The population density was 1,350.6 inhabitants per square mile (521.5/km^{2}). There were 138 housing units at an average density of 564.8 per square mile (218.1/km^{2}). The racial makeup of the town was 99.09% White, 0.61% from other races, and 0.30% from two or more races. Hispanic or Latino of any race were 0.91% of the population.

There were 129 households, out of which 38.8% had children under the age of 18 living with them, 59.7% were married couples living together, 9.3% had a female householder with no husband present, and 28.7% were non-families. 24.8% of all households were made up of individuals, and 12.4% had someone living alone who was 65 years of age or older. The average household size was 2.56 and the average family size was 3.08.

In the town, the population was spread out, with 30.0% under the age of 18, 8.5% from 18 to 24, 29.1% from 25 to 44, 19.1% from 45 to 64, and 13.3% who were 65 years of age or older. The median age was 33 years. For every 100 females, there were 89.7 males. For every 100 females age 18 and over, there were 86.3 males.

The median income for a household in the town was $37,917, and the median income for a family was $43,125. Males had a median income of $30,208 versus $19,688 for females. The per capita income for the town was $14,897. About 6.4% of families and 8.4% of the population were below the poverty line, including 7.9% of those under age 18 and 26.3% of those age 65 or over.
