= Hanson County, South Dakota =

County in the United States

- County
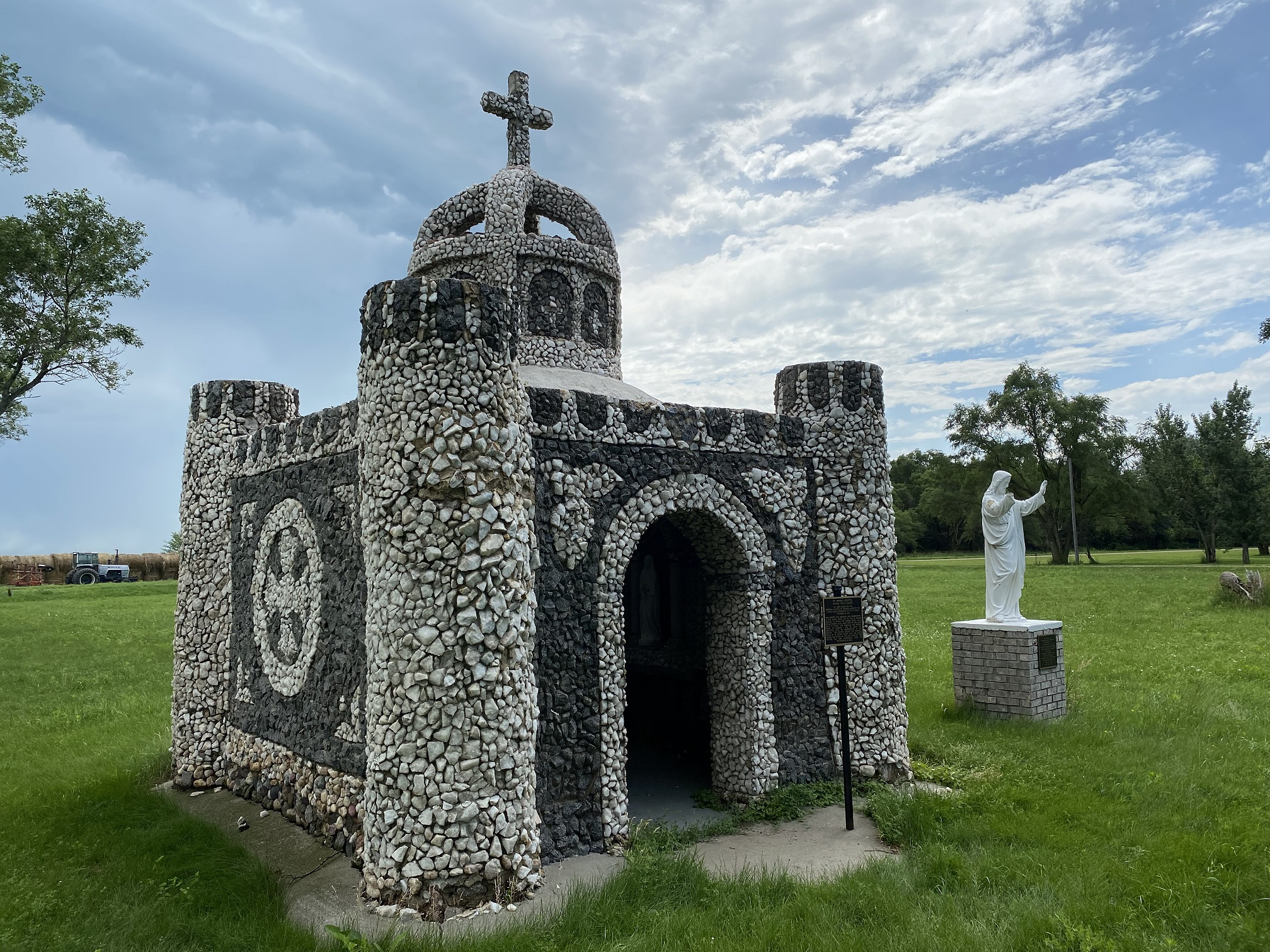
- Saint Peter's Grotto is on the National Register of Historic Places

- Location within the U.S. state of South Dakota
- Coordinates: 43°40′50.203″N 97°47′48.642″W
- Country: United States
- State: South Dakota
- Founded: January 13, 1871 (created); 1873 (organized)
- Named for: Joseph R. Hanson
- Seat: Alexandria
- Largest city: Alexandria

Area
  - Total: 435.355 sq mi (1,127.56 km^{2})
  - Land: 434.582 sq mi (1,125.56 km^{2})
  - Water: 0.773 sq mi (2.00 km^{2}) 0.2%

Population (2020)
  - Total: 3,461
  - Estimate (2025): 3,456 ▼
  - Density: 8/sq mi (3.1/km^{2})
- Time zone: UTC−6 (Central)
  - Summer (DST): UTC−5 (CDT)
- Congressional district: At-large
- Website: hansoncountysd.gov

Hanson County is a county in the U.S. state of South Dakota. As of the 2020 census, the population was 3,461. Its county seat is Alexandria. The county was founded in 1871 and organized in 1873. It was named for Joseph R. Hanson, clerk of the first legislature. Hanson County is part of the Mitchell, SD Micropolitan Statistical Area. The county is somewhat unique among those in the United States in that there are no officially registered airports within the county borders.

== Geography ==
The terrain of Hanson County consists of low rolling hills; its area is mostly devoted to agriculture. The James River flows southeastward through the lower western part of the county. The terrain slopes toward the river basin on both sides, and generally gently slopes to the south.

According to the United States Census Bureau, the county has a total area of 435.355 square miles (1,127.56 km^{2}), of which 434.582 square miles (1,125.56 km^{2}) is land and 0.773 square miles (2.00 km^{2}) (0.2%) is water. It is the 64th largest county in South Dakota by total area.

=== Major highways ===
- Interstate 90
- South Dakota Highway 25
- South Dakota Highway 38
- South Dakota Highway 42
- South Dakota Highway 262

=== Adjacent counties ===
- Miner County – north
- McCook County – east
- Hutchinson County – south
- Davison County – west
- Sanborn County – northwest

== Demographics ==
Historical population
Census	Pop.	Note	%±
1880	1,301		—
1890	4,267		228.0%
1900	4,947		15.9%
1910	6,237		26.1%
1920	6,202		−0.6%
1930	6,131		−1.1%
1940	5,400		−11.9%
1950	4,896		−9.3%
1960	4,584		−6.4%
1970	3,781		−17.5%
1980	3,415		−9.7%
1990	2,994		−12.3%
2000	3,139		4.8%
2010	3,331		6.1%
2020	3,461		3.9%
2025 (est.)	3,456	▼	−0.1%
U.S. Decennial Census:

=== 2020 census ===
As of the 2020 census, there were 3,461 people, 1,146 households, and 855 families residing in the county. The population density was 8.0 inhabitants per square mile (3.1/km^{2}).

Of the residents, 29.3% were under the age of 18 and 17.5% were 65 years of age or older; the median age was 39.3 years. For every 100 females there were 104.3 males, and for every 100 females age 18 and over there were 101.6 males.

The racial makeup of the county was 96.2% White, 0.1% Black or African American, 0.2% American Indian and Alaska Native, 0.0% Asian, 0.5% from some other race, and 2.8% from two or more races. Hispanic or Latino residents of any race comprised 1.0% of the population.

There were 1,146 households in the county, of which 34.7% had children under the age of 18 living with them and 12.4% had a female householder with no spouse or partner present. About 22.3% of all households were made up of individuals and 10.3% had someone living alone who was 65 years of age or older.

There were 1,279 housing units, of which 10.4% were vacant. Among occupied housing units, 83.1% were owner-occupied and 16.9% were renter-occupied. The homeowner vacancy rate was 1.2% and the rental vacancy rate was 11.4%.

=== 2010 census ===
As of the 2010 census, there were 3,331 people, 1,045 households, and 793 families in the county. The population density was 7.7 inhabitants per square mile (3.0/km^{2}). There were 1,177 housing units at an average density of 2.7 units per square mile (1.0 units/km^{2}). The racial makeup of the county was 98.6% white, 0.3% Asian, 0.3% American Indian, 0.2% from other races, and 0.5% from two or more races. Those of Hispanic or Latino origin made up 0.5% of the population. In terms of ancestry, 63.7% were German, 10.8% were Irish, 6.2% were English, 5.2% were Norwegian, and 4.0% were American.

Of the 1,045 households, 35.0% had children under the age of 18 living with them, 68.8% were married couples living together, 3.5% had a female householder with no husband present, 24.1% were non-families, and 21.7% of all households were made up of individuals. The average household size was 2.69 and the average family size was 3.14. The median age was 35.5 years.

The median income for a household in the county was $46,556 and the median income for a family was $52,425. Males had a median income of $38,088 versus $23,750 for females. The per capita income for the county was $21,391. About 13.8% of families and 13.7% of the population were below the poverty line, including 13.6% of those under age 18 and 13.8% of those age 65 or over.

Hanson County was mentioned as an "Extreme Whitopia" in Rich Benjamin's book, Searching for Whitopia.

== Communities ==
=== Cities ===
- Alexandria (county seat)
- Emery

=== Towns ===
- Farmer
- Fulton

=== Religious communities ===
- Millbrook Colony
- Oak Lane Colony
- Rockport Colony
- Rosedale Colony

=== Unincorporated community ===
- Epiphany, partial

== Government ==
=== Townships ===
- Beulah
- Edgerton
- Emery
- Fairview
- Hanson
- Jasper
- Plano
- Rosedale
- Springlake
- Taylor
- Wayne
- Worthen

== Politics ==
Hanson County voters tend to vote Republican. Since 1936, they have selected the Republican Party candidate in 65% of national elections.

United States presidential election results for Hanson County, South Dakota
Year	Republican		Democratic		Third party(ies)	
Year	No.	%	No.	%	No.	%
1892	378	36.21%	196	18.77%	470	45.02%
1896	420	38.75%	658	60.70%	6	0.55%
1900	607	49.07%	607	49.07%	23	1.86%
1904	745	55.76%	523	39.15%	68	5.09%
1908	668	48.69%	630	45.92%	74	5.39%
1912	0	0.00%	632	45.05%	771	54.95%
1916	767	51.10%	712	47.44%	22	1.47%
1920	1,001	51.87%	418	21.66%	511	26.48%
1924	811	40.47%	299	14.92%	894	44.61%
1928	1,576	58.13%	1,129	41.65%	6	0.22%
1932	845	31.89%	1,783	67.28%	22	0.83%
1936	1,090	40.25%	1,530	56.50%	88	3.25%
1940	1,408	53.66%	1,216	46.34%	0	0.00%
1944	1,070	55.33%	864	44.67%	0	0.00%
1948	860	47.05%	953	52.13%	15	0.82%
1952	1,320	63.07%	773	36.93%	0	0.00%
1956	1,050	46.94%	1,187	53.06%	0	0.00%
1960	1,087	48.53%	1,153	51.47%	0	0.00%
1964	802	39.43%	1,232	60.57%	0	0.00%
1968	901	50.08%	826	45.91%	72	4.00%
1972	876	45.96%	1,022	53.62%	8	0.42%
1976	693	40.60%	1,005	58.88%	9	0.53%
1980	1,015	58.84%	598	34.67%	112	6.49%
1984	898	58.69%	625	40.85%	7	0.46%
1988	786	50.00%	776	49.36%	10	0.64%
1992	522	36.38%	566	39.44%	347	24.18%
1996	801	52.22%	541	35.27%	192	12.52%
2000	944	66.43%	457	32.16%	20	1.41%
2004	1,379	64.14%	745	34.65%	26	1.21%
2008	1,426	58.66%	961	39.53%	44	1.81%
2012	1,627	67.34%	760	31.46%	29	1.20%
2016	1,497	74.63%	424	21.14%	85	4.24%
2020	1,793	75.08%	557	23.32%	38	1.59%
2024	1,611	78.74%	399	19.50%	36	1.76%

== See also ==
- National Register of Historic Places listings in Hanson County, South Dakota
