= Saint Peter's Grotto =

- U.S. National Register of Historic Places
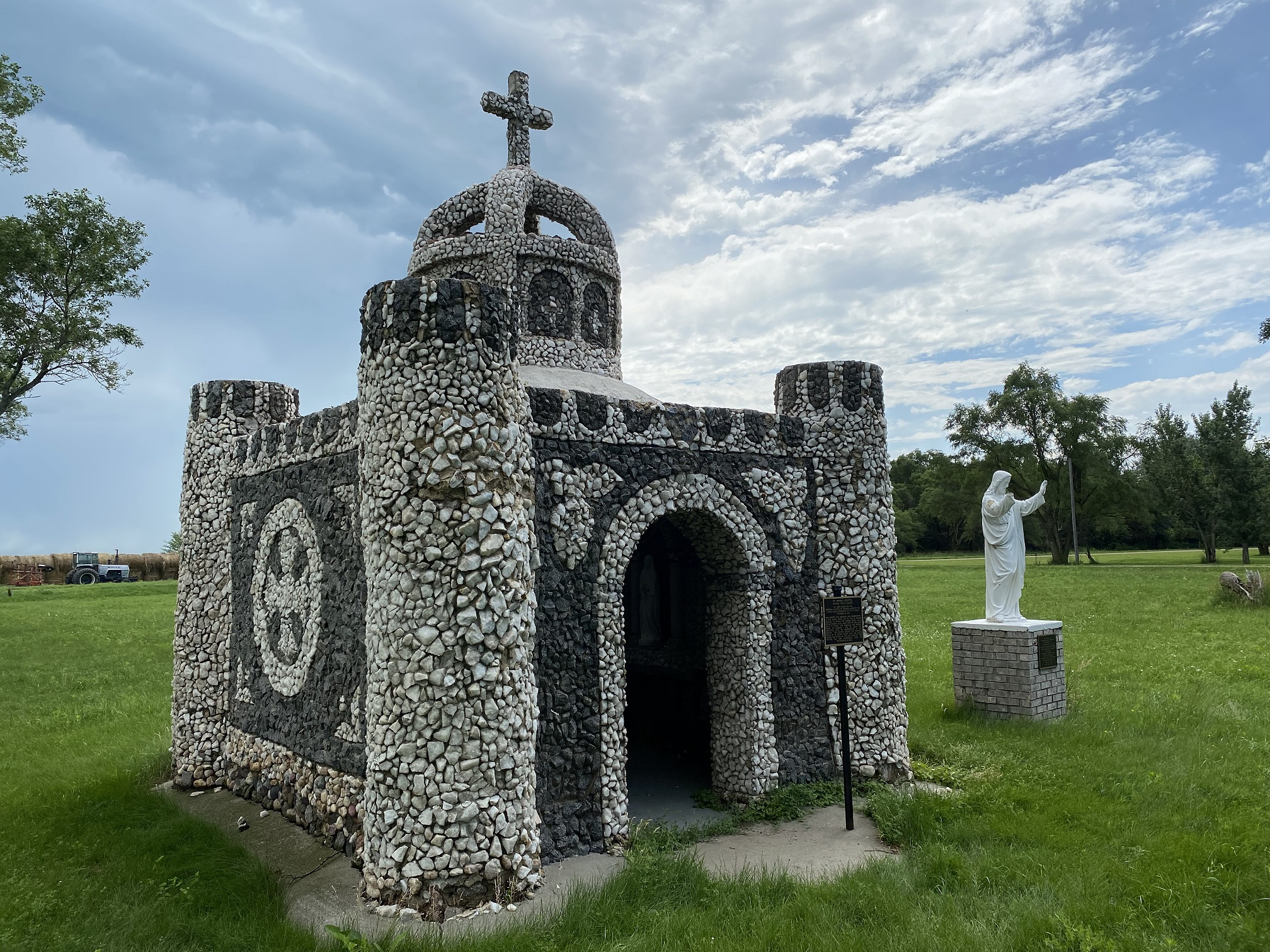

- Location within South Dakota Location within the United States
- Location: O.5 mi N of the former Chicago and North Western, Farmer, South Dakota
- Coordinates: 43°43′33″N 97°41′14″W
- Area: less than one acre
- Built: 1926-33
- Built by: Fr. Peter N. Scheier
- Architectural style: Folk Art
- NRHP reference No.: 01000686
- Added to NRHP: November 5, 2001

Saint Peter's Grotto, also known as Farmer South Dakota Grotto, is a Folk Art structure. Located in Farmer, South Dakota, it was listed on the National Register of Historic Places in 2001.

It was built during 1926 to 1933 by Fr. Peter N. Scheier. It is 13.5 by 13.5 feet (4.1 m × 4.1 m) in plan. It has a turret at each corner and one at the top of its dome.
