= Alexandria, South Dakota =

- City
- Location in Hanson County and the state of South Dakota
- Coordinates: 43°39′15″N 97°46′48″W
- Country: United States
- State: South Dakota
- County: Hanson
- Founded: 1880
- Incorporated: 1885

Area
  - Total: 0.62 sq mi (1.61 km^{2})
  - Land: 0.62 sq mi (1.61 km^{2})
  - Water: 0 sq mi (0.00 km^{2})
- Elevation: 1,352 ft (412 m)

Population (2020)
  - Total: 649
  - Density: 1,040.9/sq mi (401.88/km^{2})
- Time zone: UTC-6 (Central (CST))
  - Summer (DST): UTC-5 (CDT)
- ZIP code: 57311
- Area code: 605
- FIPS code: 46-00820
- GNIS feature ID: 1267263
- Website: City of Alexandria

Alexandria is a city in central Hanson County, South Dakota, United States. The population was 649 at the 2020 census. It is the county seat of Hanson County.

== History ==
In 1879, the community was founded with the name Clarksville. Its post office was established in 1880, and the city later incorporated in 1885 as Alexandria. The city was named after Alexander Mitchell.

== Geography ==
According to the United States Census Bureau, the city has a total area of 0.62 square miles (1.61 km^{2}), all land.

=== Climate ===
Climate data for Alexandria, South Dakota (1991−2020 normals, extremes 1893−present)
Month	Jan	Feb	Mar	Apr	May	Jun	Jul	Aug	Sep	Oct	Nov	Dec	Year
Record high °F (°C)	69 (21)	73 (23)	93 (34)	98 (37)	108 (42)	109 (43)	114 (46)	114 (46)	109 (43)	96 (36)	84 (29)	72 (22)	114 (46)
Mean daily maximum °F (°C)	25.3 (−3.7)	31.0 (−0.6)	43.8 (6.6)	57.6 (14.2)	69.4 (20.8)	79.3 (26.3)	84.2 (29.0)	81.8 (27.7)	75.1 (23.9)	60.0 (15.6)	43.2 (6.2)	29.2 (−1.6)	56.7 (13.7)
Daily mean °F (°C)	15.5 (−9.2)	20.3 (−6.5)	32.2 (0.1)	44.8 (7.1)	56.9 (13.8)	67.4 (19.7)	72.1 (22.3)	69.6 (20.9)	61.9 (16.6)	47.4 (8.6)	32.3 (0.2)	19.7 (−6.8)	45.0 (7.2)
Mean daily minimum °F (°C)	5.8 (−14.6)	9.6 (−12.4)	20.7 (−6.3)	31.9 (−0.1)	44.4 (6.9)	55.6 (13.1)	60.0 (15.6)	57.4 (14.1)	48.6 (9.2)	34.7 (1.5)	21.4 (−5.9)	10.3 (−12.1)	33.4 (0.8)
Record low °F (°C)	−41 (−41)	−38 (−39)	−22 (−30)	2 (−17)	16 (−9)	31 (−1)	33 (1)	32 (0)	11 (−12)	−10 (−23)	−21 (−29)	−31 (−35)	−41 (−41)
Average precipitation inches (mm)	0.47 (12)	0.74 (19)	1.13 (29)	2.88 (73)	3.64 (92)	3.97 (101)	3.13 (80)	3.02 (77)	2.81 (71)	2.01 (51)	0.92 (23)	0.60 (15)	25.32 (643)
Average snowfall inches (cm)	6.1 (15)	8.0 (20)	5.2 (13)	4.7 (12)	0.0 (0.0)	0.0 (0.0)	0.0 (0.0)	0.0 (0.0)	0.0 (0.0)	0.9 (2.3)	3.2 (8.1)	8.2 (21)	36.3 (92)
Average precipitation days (≥ 0.01 in)	4.6	4.7	5.8	8.0	10.8	10.0	7.9	7.1	6.6	6.7	4.3	4.6	81.1
Average snowy days (≥ 0.1 in)	3.9	3.7	2.7	1.8	0.0	0.0	0.0	0.0	0.0	0.4	1.6	4.1	18.2
Source: NOAA

== Demographics ==
Historical population
Census	Pop.	Note	%±
1900	680		—
1910	955		40.4%
1920	965		1.0%
1930	688		−28.7%
1940	746		8.4%
1950	714		−4.3%
1960	614		−14.0%
1970	598		−2.6%
1980	588		−1.7%
1990	518		−11.9%
2000	563		8.7%
2010	615		9.2%
2020	649		5.5%

Alexandria is part of the Mitchell, South Dakota Micropolitan Statistical Area.

=== 2020 census ===
As of the 2020 census, Alexandria had a population of 649. The median age was 39.4 years. 26.2% of residents were under the age of 18 and 15.3% of residents were 65 years of age or older. For every 100 females there were 94.3 males, and for every 100 females age 18 and over there were 99.6 males age 18 and over.

0.0% of residents lived in urban areas, while 100.0% lived in rural areas.

There were 248 households in Alexandria, of which 38.3% had children under the age of 18 living in them. Of all households, 65.7% were married-couple households, 14.9% were households with a male householder and no spouse or partner present, and 14.9% were households with a female householder and no spouse or partner present. About 22.6% of all households were made up of individuals and 11.2% had someone living alone who was 65 years of age or older.

There were 266 housing units, of which 6.8% were vacant. The homeowner vacancy rate was 0.0% and the rental vacancy rate was 15.2%.

Racial composition as of the 2020 census
Race	Number	Percent
White	625	96.3%
Black or African American	0	0.0%
American Indian and Alaska Native	1	0.2%
Asian	0	0.0%
Native Hawaiian and Other Pacific Islander	0	0.0%
Some other race	5	0.8%
Two or more races	18	2.8%
Hispanic or Latino (of any race)	4	0.6%

=== 2010 census ===
As of the census of 2010, there were 615 people, 231 households, and 171 families residing in the city. The population density was 991.9 inhabitants per square mile (383.0/km^{2}). There were 249 housing units at an average density of 401.6 per square mile (155.1/km^{2}). The racial makeup of the city was 98.5% White, 0.5% Asian, 0.7% from other races, and 0.3% from two or more races. Hispanic or Latino of any race were 1.6% of the population.

There were 231 households, of which 35.1% had children under the age of 18 living with them, 66.7% were married couples living together, 4.8% had a female householder with no husband present, 2.6% had a male householder with no wife present, and 26.0% were non-families. 23.8% of all households were made up of individuals, and 9.9% had someone living alone who was 65 years of age or older. The average household size was 2.66 and the average family size was 3.11.

The median age in the city was 37.5 years. 28.3% of residents were under the age of 18; 6.3% were between the ages of 18 and 24; 26.5% were from 25 to 44; 26.3% were from 45 to 64; and 12.8% were 65 years of age or older. The gender makeup of the city was 49.8% male and 50.2% female.

=== 2000 census ===
As of the census of 2000, there were 563 people, 234 households, and 146 families residing in the city. The population density was 1,041.9 inhabitants per square mile (402.3/km^{2}). There were 251 housing units at an average density of 464.5 per square mile (179.3/km^{2}). The racial makeup of the city was 99.29% White, 0.18% Native American, 0.18% Asian, and 0.36% from two or more races. Hispanic or Latino of any race were 0.18% of the population.

There were 234 households, out of which 32.5% had children under the age of 18 living with them, 58.5% were married couples living together, 3.4% had a female householder with no husband present, and 37.2% were non-families. 34.2% of all households were made up of individuals, and 20.1% had someone living alone who was 65 years of age or older. The average household size was 2.41 and the average family size was 3.15.

In the city, the population was spread out, with 27.5% under the age of 18, 7.5% from 18 to 24, 27.5% from 25 to 44, 20.4% from 45 to 64, and 17.1% who were 65 years of age or older. The median age was 38 years. For every 100 females, there were 102.5 males. For every 100 females age 18 and over, there were 94.3 males.

The median income for a household in the city was $31,875, and the median income for a family was $45,333. Males had a median income of $30,500 versus $19,500 for females. The per capita income for the city was $16,120. About 2.8% of families and 6.2% of the population were below the poverty line, including 3.8% of those under age 18 and 9.7% of those age 65 or over.

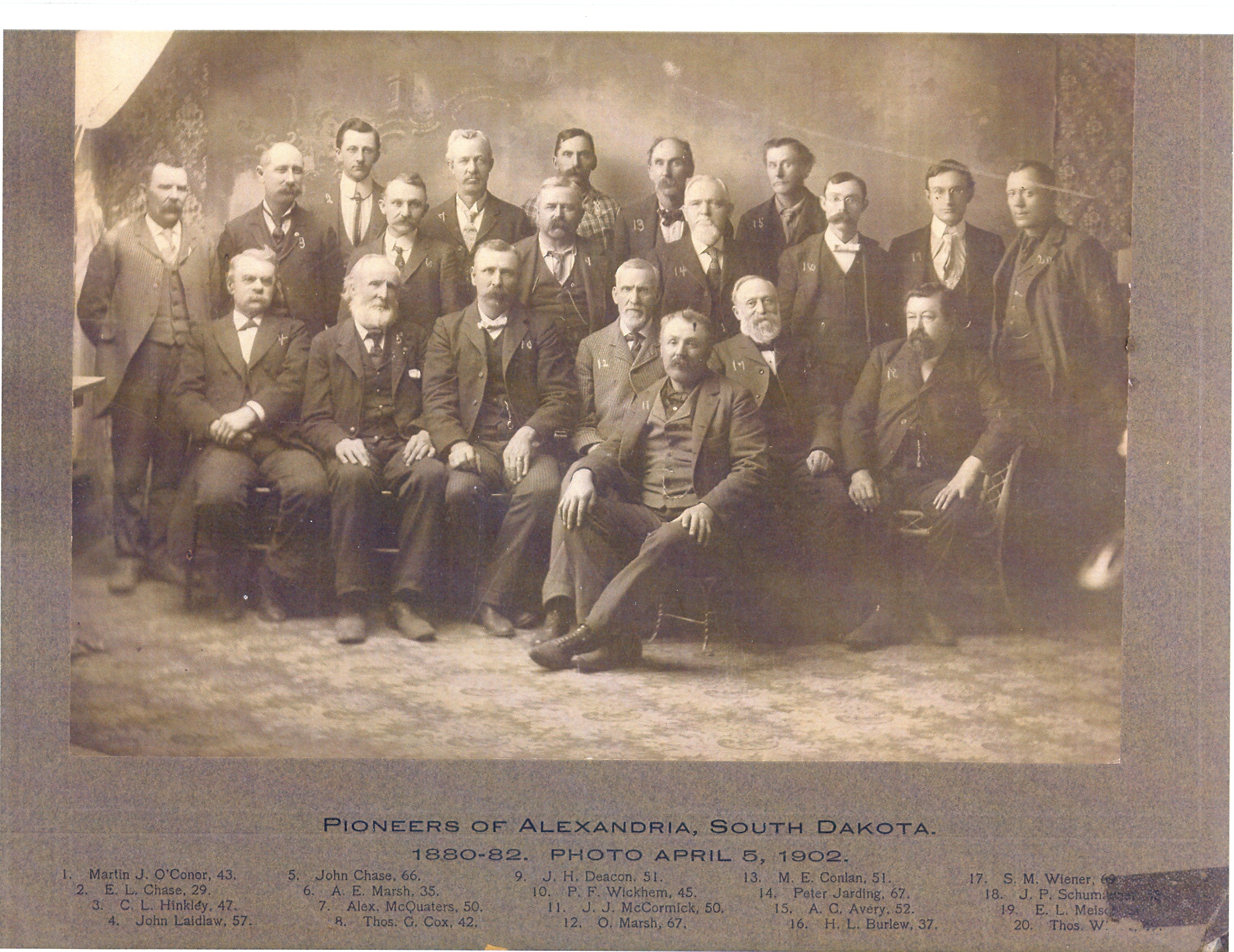
Pioneers of Alexandria, South Dakota 1880–82, photo April 5, 1902

== Notable people ==
- Martin Conlan, member of the South Dakota State Senate
- Henry Montgomery, member of the South Dakota House of Representatives

== See also ==
- List of cities in South Dakota
