= Mitchell, South Dakota =

- City
- Corn Palace in Mitchell
- Nickname: "The Palace City"
- Location in Davison County and South Dakota

- Location in the United States
- Coordinates: 43°43′46″N 98°02′01″W
- Country: United States
- State: South Dakota
- County: Davison
- Incorporated: 1883

Government
  - Mayor: Jordan Hanson

Area
  - City: 12.30 sq mi (31.85 km^{2})
  - Land: 11.24 sq mi (29.10 km^{2})
  - Water: 1.06 sq mi (2.75 km^{2})
- Elevation: 1,299 ft (396 m)

Population (2020)
  - City: 15,660
  - Density: 1,393.6/sq mi (538.07/km^{2})
  - Metro: 23,127
- Time zone: UTC−6 (Central (CST))
  - Summer (DST): UTC−5 (CDT)
- ZIP code: 57301
- Area code: 605
- FIPS code: 46-43100
- GNIS feature ID: 1267480
- Website: City of Mitchell

Mitchell (Lakota: Čhaŋkȟá-Ok'é) is a city in and the county seat of Davison County, South Dakota, United States. The population was 15,660 at the 2020 census making it the seventh most populous city in South Dakota.

Mitchell is the principal city of the Mitchell Micropolitan Statistical Area, which includes all of Davison and Hanson counties. The city is home to Dakota Wesleyan University.

== History ==
The first settlement at Mitchell was made in 1879. Mitchell was incorporated in 1883. It was named for Milwaukee banker Alexander Mitchell, President of the Chicago, Milwaukee, and St. Paul Railroad (Milwaukee Road).

== Geography ==
Mitchell is located on the James River. Enemy Creek is located 4.5 miles (7.2 km) southeast of the city.

According to the United States Census Bureau, the city has a total area of 12.14 square miles (31.44 km^{2}), of which 11.14 square miles (28.85 km^{2}) is land and 1.00 square mile (2.59 km^{2}) is water.

== Climate ==
Mitchell has a humid continental climate, similar to other locations in the Upper Midwest, with cold winters and warm sometimes humid summers. Average daytime summer temperatures range from 86 °F (30 °C) during the day, and 62 °F (16 °C) during the night, and winter daytime temperatures average 26 °F (−3 °C) during the day, and 4 °F ( -15 °C) during the night. Most of the precipitation falls during the summer months, the wettest month being June, with an average of 3.52 inches (89.4 mm) of rain, and the driest month is January, with only 0.47 inches (11.9 mm) of rain. Mitchell is located in Tornado Alley, so thunderstorms, often spawning tornadoes, can be expected.

Climate data for Mitchell, South Dakota (1991–2020 normals, extremes 1893–present)
| Month | Jan | Feb | Mar | Apr | May | Jun | Jul | Aug | Sep | Oct | Nov | Dec | Year |
|---|---|---|---|---|---|---|---|---|---|---|---|---|---|
| Record high °F (°C) | 68 (20) | 72 (22) | 95 (35) | 97 (36) | 108 (42) | 111 (44) | 116 (47) | 115 (46) | 106 (41) | 96 (36) | 84 (29) | 70 (21) | 116 (47) |
| Mean maximum °F (°C) | 50.6 (10.3) | 56.6 (13.7) | 71.8 (22.1) | 83.1 (28.4) | 90.3 (32.4) | 95.0 (35.0) | 99.0 (37.2) | 96.1 (35.6) | 92.8 (33.8) | 84.3 (29.1) | 69.2 (20.7) | 52.7 (11.5) | 100.4 (38.0) |
| Mean daily maximum °F (°C) | 27.3 (−2.6) | 32.4 (0.2) | 45.2 (7.3) | 58.6 (14.8) | 70.3 (21.3) | 80.9 (27.2) | 87.0 (30.6) | 84.0 (28.9) | 76.1 (24.5) | 60.9 (16.1) | 44.8 (7.1) | 30.8 (−0.7) | 58.2 (14.6) |
| Daily mean °F (°C) | 18.3 (−7.6) | 22.9 (−5.1) | 35.1 (1.7) | 47.6 (8.7) | 59.5 (15.3) | 70.2 (21.2) | 76.1 (24.5) | 73.0 (22.8) | 64.6 (18.1) | 50.0 (10.0) | 35.1 (1.7) | 22.7 (−5.2) | 47.9 (8.8) |
| Mean daily minimum °F (°C) | 9.3 (−12.6) | 13.4 (−10.3) | 25.1 (−3.8) | 36.5 (2.5) | 48.7 (9.3) | 59.5 (15.3) | 65.3 (18.5) | 62.1 (16.7) | 53.0 (11.7) | 39.1 (3.9) | 25.5 (−3.6) | 14.5 (−9.7) | 37.7 (3.2) |
| Mean minimum °F (°C) | −14.9 (−26.1) | −9.6 (−23.1) | 0.8 (−17.3) | 18.8 (−7.3) | 32.6 (0.3) | 46.2 (7.9) | 51.3 (10.7) | 48.7 (9.3) | 34.3 (1.3) | 20.2 (−6.6) | 5.5 (−14.7) | −8.1 (−22.3) | −19.6 (−28.7) |
| Record low °F (°C) | −38 (−39) | −40 (−40) | −23 (−31) | 1 (−17) | 18 (−8) | 31 (−1) | 34 (1) | 34 (1) | 11 (−12) | −8 (−22) | −22 (−30) | −34 (−37) | −40 (−40) |
| Average precipitation inches (mm) | 0.61 (15) | 0.76 (19) | 1.26 (32) | 2.76 (70) | 3.69 (94) | 3.95 (100) | 3.02 (77) | 3.09 (78) | 2.64 (67) | 2.11 (54) | 1.12 (28) | 0.77 (20) | 25.78 (655) |
| Average snowfall inches (cm) | 5.6 (14) | 8.3 (21) | 5.8 (15) | 6.0 (15) | 0.0 (0.0) | 0.0 (0.0) | 0.0 (0.0) | 0.0 (0.0) | 0.0 (0.0) | 0.6 (1.5) | 4.1 (10) | 10.2 (26) | 40.6 (103) |
| Average precipitation days (≥ 0.01 in) | 5.0 | 6.2 | 6.9 | 8.8 | 11.8 | 10.5 | 6.7 | 8.0 | 7.3 | 7.9 | 3.5 | 6.4 | 89.0 |
| Average snowy days (≥ 0.1 in) | 4.8 | 5.3 | 4.0 | 1.7 | 0.0 | 0.0 | 0.0 | 0.0 | 0.0 | 0.6 | 1.8 | 5.8 | 24.0 |
Source: NOAA

== Demographics ==
Historical population
| Census | Pop. | Note | %± |
|---|---|---|---|
| 1880 | 320 | | — |
| 1890 | 2,217 | | 592.8% |
| 1900 | 4,055 | | 82.9% |
| 1910 | 6,515 | | 60.7% |
| 1920 | 8,478 | | 30.1% |
| 1930 | 10,942 | | 29.1% |
| 1940 | 10,633 | | −2.8% |
| 1950 | 12,123 | | 14.0% |
| 1960 | 12,555 | | 3.6% |
| 1970 | 13,425 | | 6.9% |
| 1980 | 13,916 | | 3.7% |
| 1990 | 13,798 | | −0.8% |
| 2000 | 14,558 | | 5.5% |
| 2010 | 15,254 | | 4.8% |
| 2020 | 15,660 | | 2.7% |
U.S. Decennial Census

=== 2020 census ===
As of the 2020 census, Mitchell had a population of 15,660. The median age was 38.5 years, with 22.7% of residents under the age of 18 and 19.8% 65 years of age or older. For every 100 females there were 98.8 males, and for every 100 females age 18 and over there were 96.8 males age 18 and over.

According to the census, 99.7% of residents lived in urban areas, while 0.3% lived in rural areas.

There were 6,883 households in Mitchell, of which 25.3% had children under the age of 18 living in them. Of all households, 39.8% were married-couple households, 24.0% were households with a male householder and no spouse or partner present, and 29.4% were households with a female householder and no spouse or partner present. About 38.9% of all households were made up of individuals and 15.8% had someone living alone who was 65 years of age or older.

There were 7,680 housing units, of which 10.4% were vacant. The homeowner vacancy rate was 2.0% and the rental vacancy rate was 13.5%.

Racial composition as of the 2020 census
| Race | Number | Percent |
|---|---|---|
| White | 13,721 | 87.6% |
| Black or African American | 151 | 1.0% |
| American Indian and Alaska Native | 609 | 3.9% |
| Asian | 101 | 0.6% |
| Native Hawaiian and Other Pacific Islander | 0 | 0.0% |
| Some other race | 390 | 2.5% |
| Two or more races | 688 | 4.4% |
| Hispanic or Latino (of any race) | 833 | 5.3% |

=== 2010 census ===
As of the census of 2010, there were 15,254 people, 6,696 households, and 3,641 families living in the city. The population density was 1,369.3 inhabitants per square mile (528.7/km^{2}). There were 7,120 housing units at an average density of 639.1 per square mile (246.8/km^{2}). The racial makeup of the city was 93.6% White, 0.5% African American, 3.0% Native American, 0.5% Asian, 0.1% Pacific Islander, 0.6% from other races, and 1.8% from two or more races. Hispanic or Latino of any race were 1.7% of the population.

There were 6,696 households, of which 26.4% had children under the age of 18 living with them, 41.1% were married couples living together, 9.5% had a female householder with no husband present, 3.7% had a male householder with no wife present, and 45.6% were non-families. 38.3% of all households were made up of individuals, and 15.7% had someone living alone who was 65 years of age or older. The average household size was 2.16 and the average family size was 2.88.

The median age in the city was 36.8 years. 22.6% of residents were under the age of 18; 12.5% were between the ages of 18 and 24; 22.8% were from 25 to 44; 23.9% were from 45 to 64; and 18.2% were 65 years of age or older. The gender makeup of the city was 48.8% male and 51.2% female.

=== 2000 census ===
As of the census of 2000, there were 14,558 people, 6,121 households, and 3,599 families living in the city. The population density was 1,475.7 inhabitants per square mile (569.8/km^{2}). There were 6,555 housing units at an average density of 664.4 per square mile (256.5/km^{2}). The racial makeup of the city was 95.63% White, 0.32% African American, 2.40% Native American, 0.45% Asian, 0.03% Pacific Islander, 0.29% from other races, and 0.87% from two or more races. Hispanic or Latino of any race were 0.77% of the population.

There were 6,121 households, out of which 28.9% had children under the age of 18 living with them, 46.6% were married couples living together, 9.1% had a female householder with no husband present, and 41.2% were non-families. 34.3% of all households were made up of individuals, and 15.0% had someone living alone who was 65 years of age or older. The average household size was 2.27 and the average family size was 2.95.

In the city, the population was spread out, with 24.1% under the age of 18, 13.4% from 18 to 24, 25.3% from 25 to 44, 19.6% from 45 to 64, and 17.6% who were 65 years of age or older. The median age was 36 years. For every 100 females, there were 91.9 males. For every 100 females age 18 and over, there were 89.4 males.

As of 2000 the median income for a household in the city was $31,308, and the median income for a family was $43,095. Males had a median income of $30,881 versus $20,794 for females. The per capita income for the city was $17,888. About 8.8% of families and 12.8% of the population were below the poverty line, including 12.7% of those under age 18 and 10.9% of those age 65 or over.

== Attractions ==
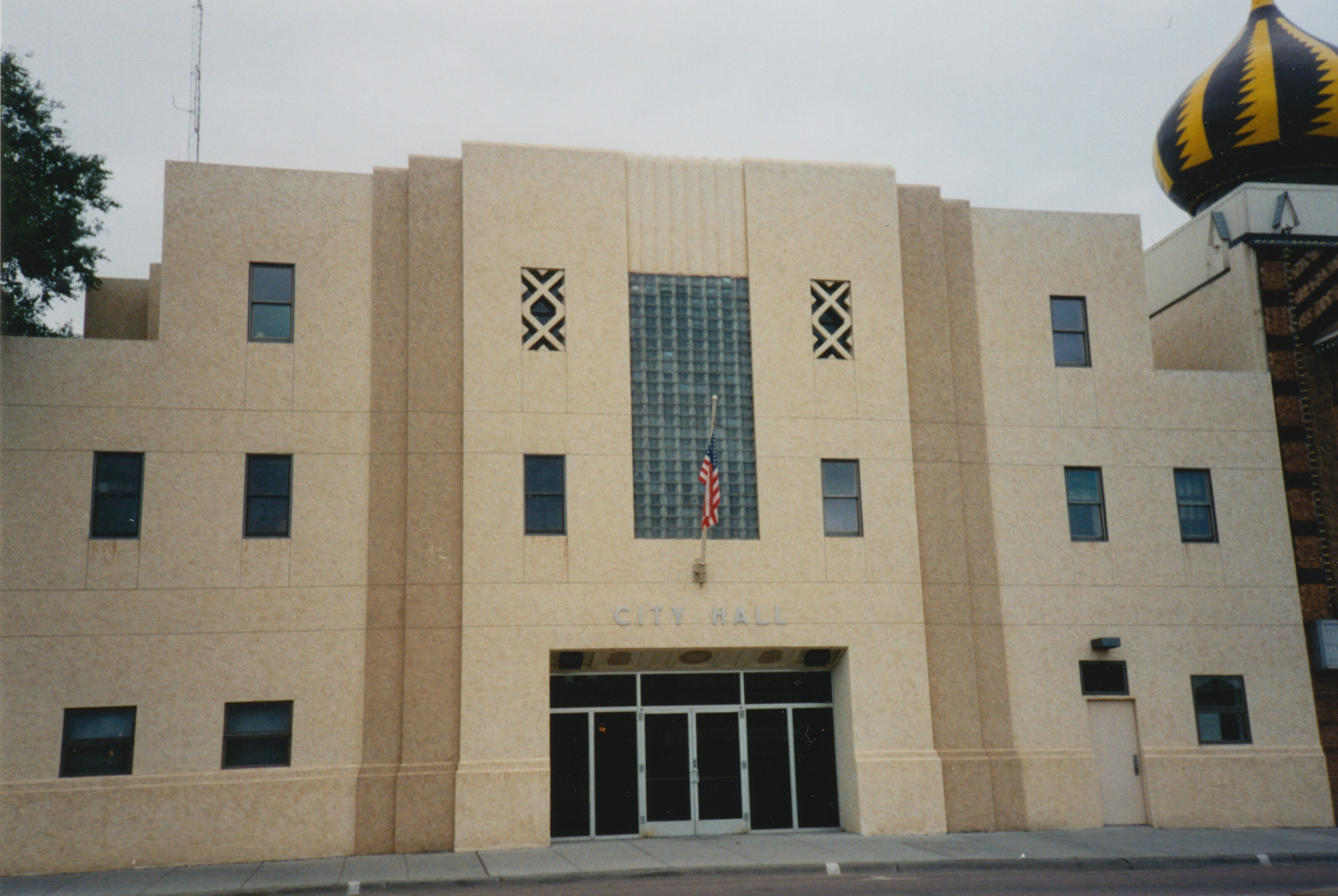
Mitchell City Hall

Mitchell is home of the Corn Palace. The Corn Palace is decorated with several colors of dried corn and grains, creating murals. The theme of the external murals is changed yearly at fall harvest; internal murals are changed approximately every ten years. The building itself is used for several purposes including a basketball arena, the local high school prom, trade shows, staged entertainment, and the Shriner's Circus.

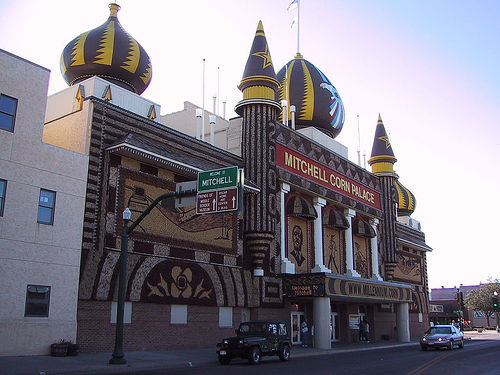
Street view of the Corn Palace

Mitchell is also the home of the Dakota Discovery Museum, whose mission is to present and preserve the history of the prairie and the people who settled it. The museum covers the time period from 1600, when Native Americans were still largely uncontacted by Europeans, to 1939, the end of the Great Depression. The museum holds one of the most complete and pristine collections of American Indian quill and bead-works. The Dakota Discovery Museum also features artists such as Harvey Dunn, James Earle Fraser, Charles Hargens and Oscar Howe. In the village area behind the main building are four authentic historical buildings, including an 1885 one-room school house and the fully furnished 1886 Victorian-Italianate home of the co-founder of the Corn Palace, Louis Beckwith. Two new features of the museum are Discovery Land, a hands-on activity area for children ages five to ten, and the Heritage Gardens Project, which brings indigenous plants to the gardens surrounding the museum and historical buildings.

The Mitchell Prehistoric Indian Village, an archaeological site where scientists are excavating a Native American village, is another attraction in the city. The site, near Lake Mitchell, is believed to have been occupied by ancestors of the present-day Mandan, who now reside in North Dakota. The excavation is unique in that it is enclosed by an Archeodome, a climate-controlled building built over the site, which allows scientists to continue their excavation work year-round.

The Mitchell area also boasts several state champion trees: Black Cherry, Black Locust, Siberian Elm, and Tulip Tree.

== Education ==
The campus of Dakota Wesleyan University is located in southwest Mitchell. The campus of Mitchell Technical College is located in southeast Mitchell

== Sports ==
The South Dakota Gold was a professional basketball club that competed in the International Basketball Association in the 2000–01 season.

== Media ==
=== AM Radio ===
AM radio stations
| Frequency | Call sign | Name | Format | Owner | City |
|---|---|---|---|---|---|
| 1490 AM & 101.3 FM | KORN | KORN News Radio 1490 | News/Talk/Sports | Nedved Media, LLC | Mitchell |

=== FM Radio ===
FM radio stations
| Frequency | Call sign | Name | Format | Owner | Target city/market | City of license |
|---|---|---|---|---|---|---|
| 89.7 FM | K209FX | K-Love | Contemporary Christian | Educational Media Foundation | Mitchell | Mitchell |
| 90.9 FM | K215AI | South Dakota Public Broadcasting | NPR | SD Board of Directors for Educational Telecommunications | Mitchell | Mitchell |
| 92.1 FM | KORN-FM | KORN Country 92.1 | Mainstream Country | Nedved Media, LLC | Mitchell | Mitchell |
| 93.3 FM | KJRV | Big Jim 93.3 | Classic Rock | Dakota Communications | Huron/Mitchell | Wessington Springs |
| 95.5 FM | K238BA | More 95.5 | AC | Saga Communications of South Dakota, LLC | Mitchell | Mitchell |
| 98.3 FM | KUQL | Kool 98.3 | Oldies | Saga Communications of South Dakota, LLC | Mitchell | Wessington Springs |
| 103.5 FM | K238BA | More 95.5 | AC | Saga Communications of South Dakota, LLC | Mitchell | Mitchell |
| 105.9 FM | KMIT | Hot Country KMIT | Country | Saga Communications of South Dakota, LLC | Mitchell | Mitchell |
| 107.3 FM | KQRN | Q107.3 | Adult hits, and Top 40 Rock and Pop Hits | Nedved Media, LLC | Mitchell | Mitchell |

=== Newspaper ===
The Mitchell Republic is Mitchell's twice weekly print and daily e-paper, owned by the Forum Communications Company.

== Transportation ==
Intercity bus service to the city is provided by Jefferson Lines.

== In popular culture ==
The novel Woodworking by Emily St. James is set in Mitchell in the run-up to the 2016 presidential election. The story focuses on the lives of trans women in varying stages of transition, including a teacher and student at Mitchell High School. St. James grew up in nearby Armour, South Dakota.

== Notable people ==
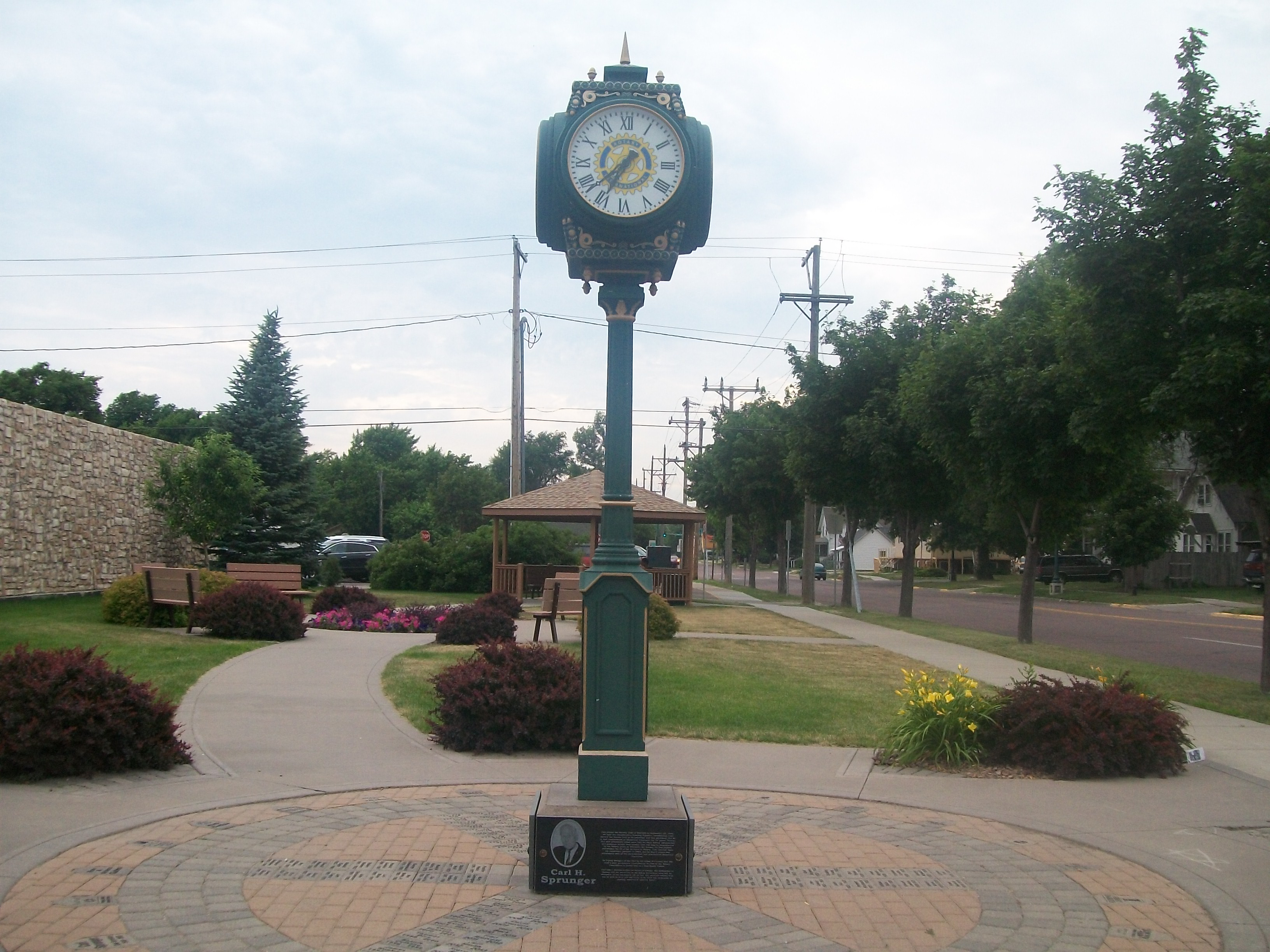
The clock at Rotary Park, across the street from the Corn Palace

- Ordell Braase, NFL player and broadcaster
- Israel Greene, adjutant of the Confederate Marine Corps
- James S. Hyde, biophysicist
- Dusty Johnson, US Congressman, former PUC Commissioner, and chief of staff to the Governor
- John Bailey Jones, United States federal judge
- George McGovern, Representative and Senator from South Dakota and 1972 Democratic nominee for President, grew up in Mitchell, and lived there until his death in 2012.
- Mike Miller, former NBA basketball player, a two-time NBA champion.
- Adam Morrison, basketball player, briefly lived in Mitchell as a young child while his father was coaching at Dakota Wesleyan.
- Gary Owens, voice actor and disc jockey
- David Rumelhart, cognitive psychologist who co-developed key neural network AI method Backpropagation with Geoffrey Hinton and Ronald J. Williams
- Howard Rushmore, journalist and investigative reporter
