= Chapel Emmanuel Railroad Car =

- U.S. National Register of Historic Places
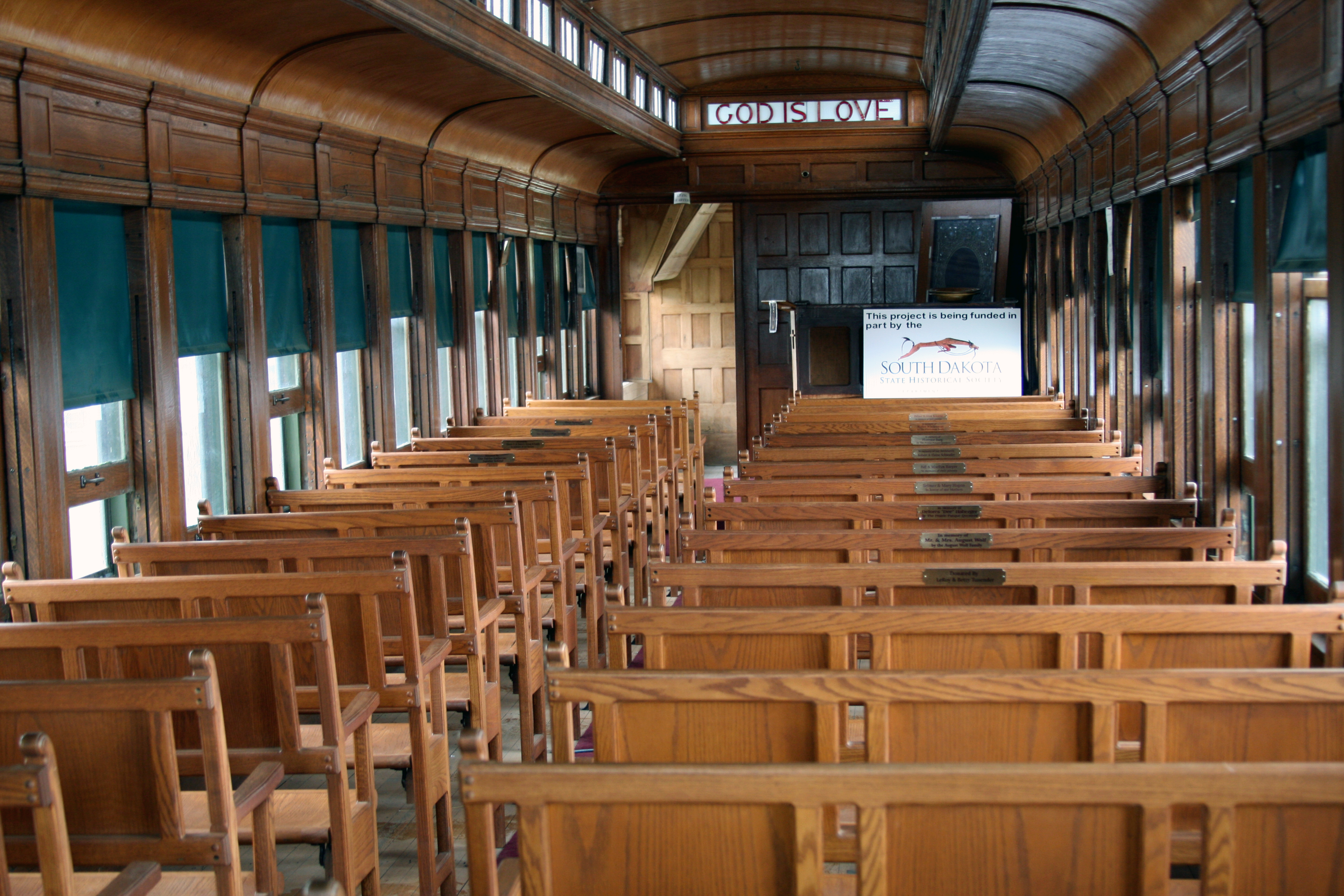
- The restored car in 2012

- Location within South Dakota Location within the United States
- Nearest city: Madison, South Dakota
- Coordinates: 44°0′26″N 97°9′57″W
- Area: less than one acre
- Built: 1893
- Built by: Barney & Smith Car Co.
- NRHP reference No.: 76001740
- Added to NRHP: September 8, 1976

The Chapel Emmanuel Railroad Car was one of thirteen railroad cars used as chapels in the United States starting about 1890. Seven of the cars were built by the Barney and Smith Car Company of Dayton, Ohio and travelled from town to town, mainly in the sparsely populated western states and territories, under the direction of the American Baptist Publication Society.

In 1893 the Chapel Emmanuel car was the second car built for the Baptists and was the longest serving, being retired about 1938. In the 1950s it was sold to a salvage business, Brandt Engineering Co., in Sioux Falls, South Dakota, who stripped it of metal and used it for storage. By 1976 the car was given to Prairie Village, a museum near Madison, South Dakota, and was listed on the National Register of Historic Places.

== History ==
The car was being built during the financial panic of 1893. While Barney and Smith was able to build the earlier Baptist chapel car, the Evangel, at cost, it was now a public corporation and was struggling to stay solvent. The price quoted for the car did not include any of the interior necessities. Many items that went into the building of the Emmanuel were donations from corporations: brakes from Westinghouse Air Brake Company, various springs and wheels, along with flatware, blankets and a range for cooking. Still others were donated by the various Baptist organizations; the car's furnishings were a gift from the women of the First Baptist Churches of Oakland and San Francisco. The car, which was ten feet longer than the Evangel, was dedicated in Denver, Colorado, on May 24, 1893.

The Wheelers, who were the first missionaries aboard the Evangel were also the first to travel with Emmanuel. In 1895, the chapel car was sent into the shop for repainting and repairs, making it necessary for the Wheelers to vacate it while the work was done. While making their way home to Minnesota, the train they were aboard was involved in a wreck and Mr. Wheeler was killed. As a memorial to him, a stained glass window was created and mounted in the door leading to the living quarters section of the car.

The car traveled in the Western and Northwestern states and territories until 1938, where it sat on a spur in South Fork, Colorado. In 1942, a decision was reached to retire the aging chapel car to a Baptist camp at Swan Lake, South Dakota, where it served as a meeting room for thirteen years before being sold for scrap. The old car was then used for storage by an engineering company. While there, a carpenter for the Prairie Village park saw the car and realized its potential to be restored. The Emmanuel was added to the National Register of Historic Places in 1976 and was fully restored by 1982. Its permanent home is at Prairie Village.

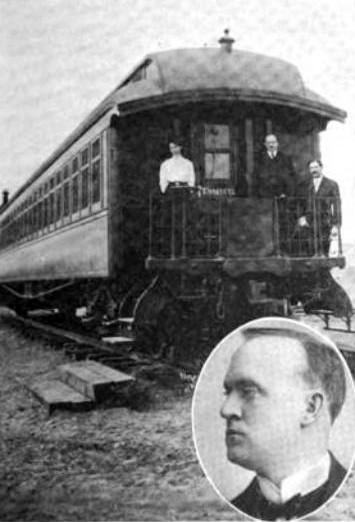
The Hermistons, who rode in Emmanuel for 41,000 miles.

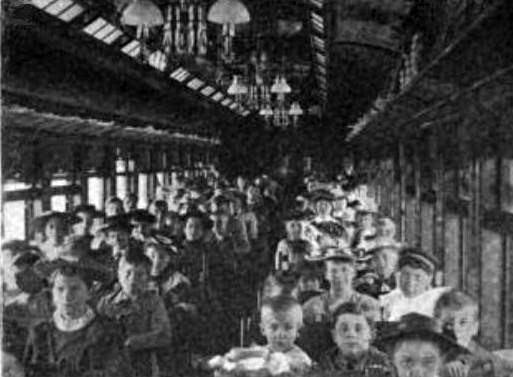
A children's service aboard Emmanuel.

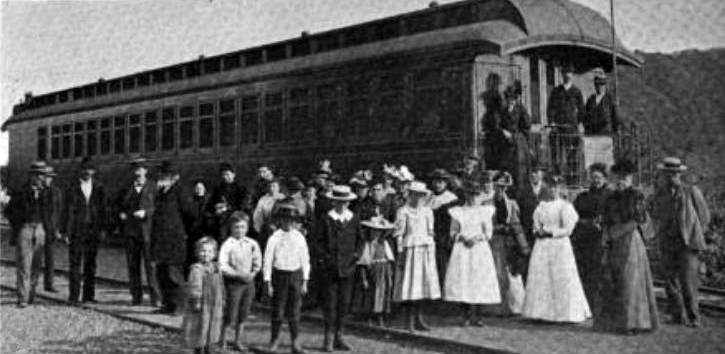
Chapel car Emmanuel in Santa Barbara, California.

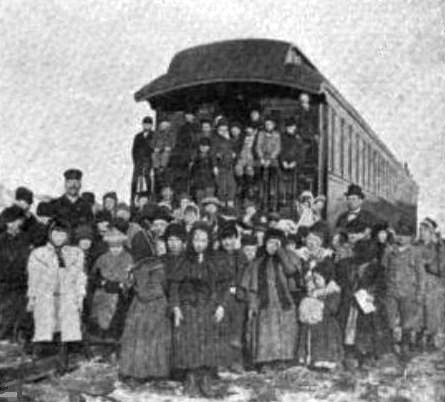
Children after a service on the car.

== See also ==
- Messenger of Peace Chapel Car
- St. Peter's Chapel Car
- National Register of Historic Places listings in Lake County, South Dakota
