= Messenger of Peace Chapel Car =

United States historic place in Snoqualmie, Washington

- U.S. National Register of Historic Places
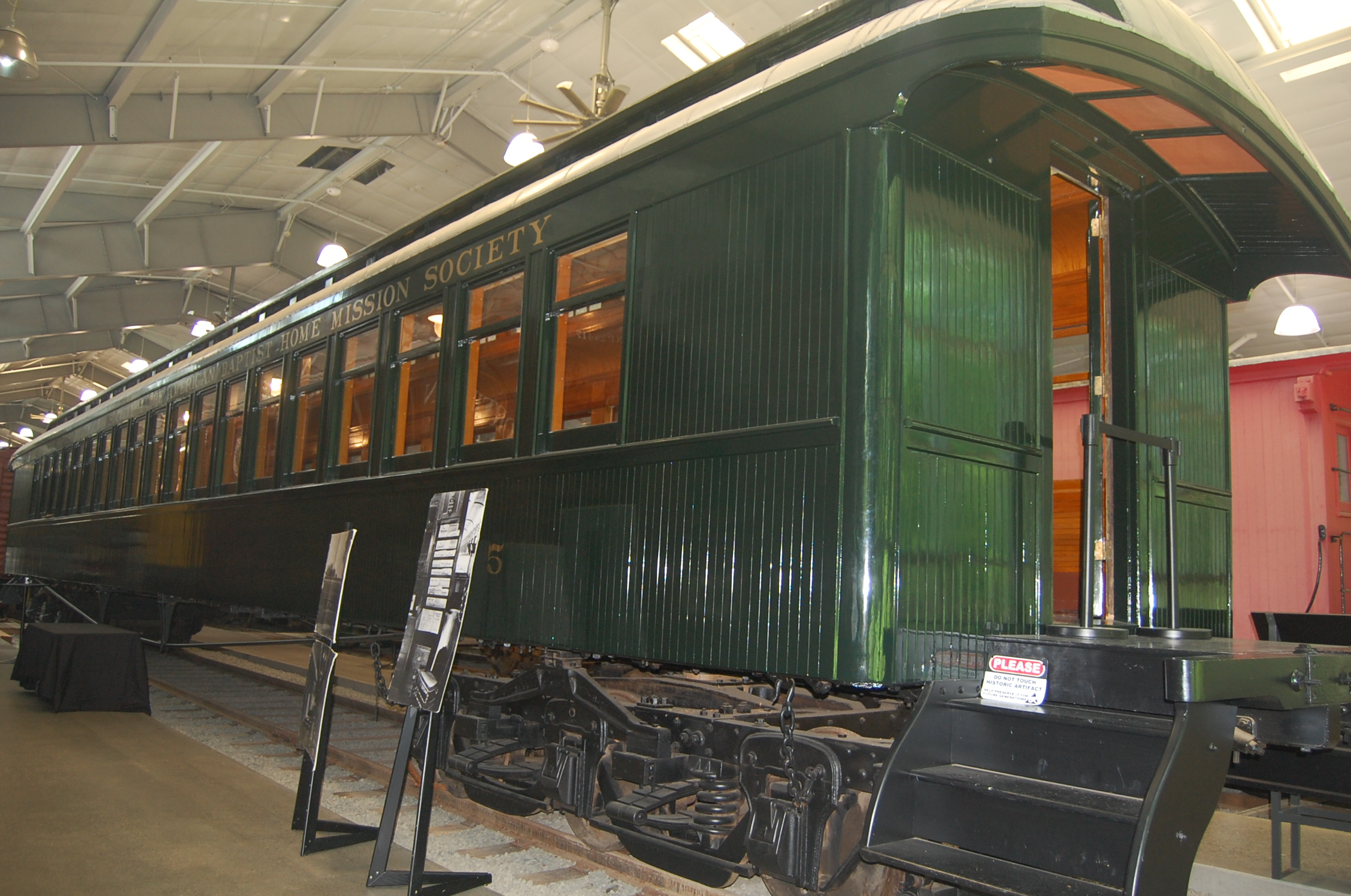
- Messenger of Peace Chapel Car in Northwest Railway Museum

- Location within Washington (state) Location within the United States
- Location: 9320 Stone Quarry Rd, Snoqualmie, Washington
- Coordinates: 47.514704°N 121.814591°W
- Built: 1898
- Built by: Barney and Smith Car Company
- Architectural style: Railroad car
- NRHP reference No.: 08000998
- Added to NRHP: January 21, 2009

Messenger of Peace is a railroad chapel car built in 1898, currently housed at the Northwest Railway Museum in Snoqualmie, Washington. It was added to the National Register of Historic Places in 2009.

== Construction ==
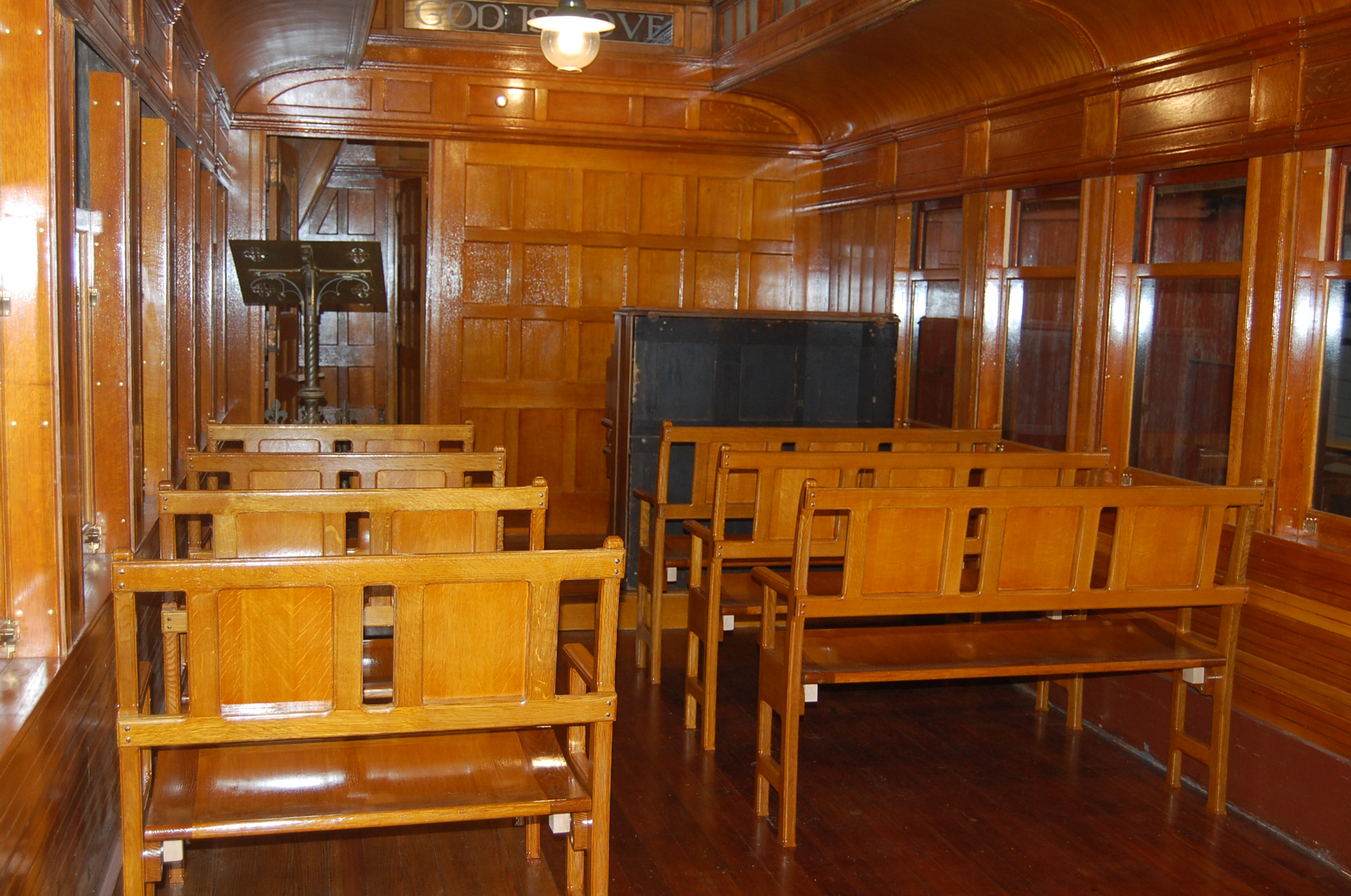
Pews in the Messenger of Peace chapel car

Messenger of Peace is a dark green, wooden railroad car made of yellow pine. The car is 70 feet (21 m) long, 10 feet (3.0 m) wide, and 13 feet (4.0 m) high when sitting on trucks. The roof is rounded with an elevated ridge in which are set clerestory casement windows for both light and ventilation. With doors located at each end of the car, the front of the car contains a small compartment that served as living quarters for the minister; the remainder of the car provided a large open area for church services. The interior has decorative vertically fluted wainscoting made of white oak. Originally, the car used kerosene lighting, which was later replaced with acetylene lighting which in turn was replaced with electric lighting.

When outfitted, it held 17 rows of pews, as well as an organ, a lectern, and a phonograph donated by Thomas Edison.

== History ==
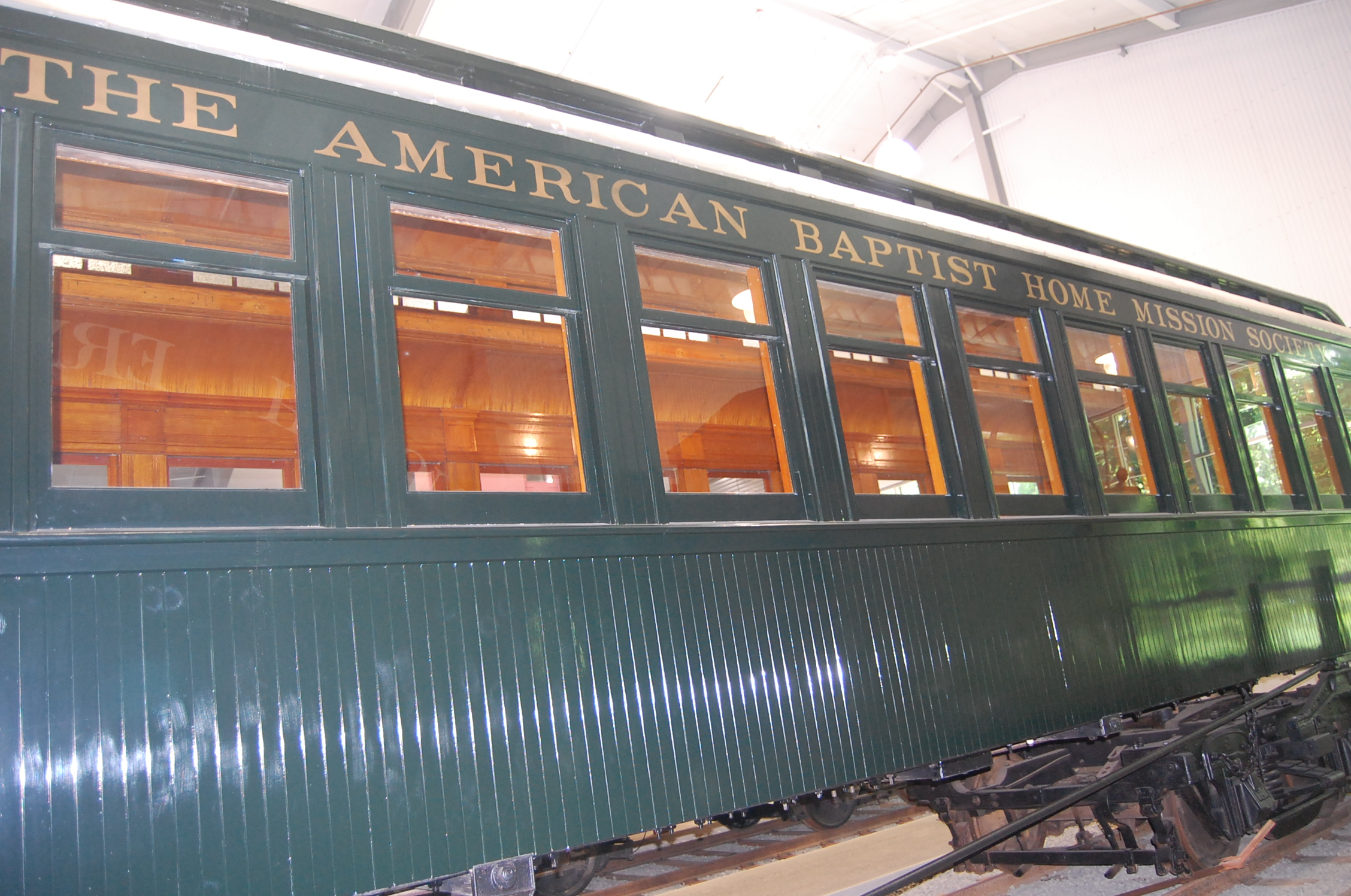
American Home Baptist Mission Society

Starting in the 1890s, specially fitted railroad cars were built to be used as mobile churches. Missionaries would travel on the cars to remote and rural areas where the cars would be left on a sidetrack to provide religious services for residents in remote communities that lacked churches. Messenger of Peace was the fifth chapel car built for the American Baptist Home Mission Society. The initial funds to build Messenger of Peace were donated by women of the Baptist church, and so it was nicknamed "the Ladies' car". Rev. Sam Neil was the first missionary to serve on the Messenger of Peace. Later missionaries to serve on "the Ladies' car" included Rev. and Mrs. Joe P. Jacobs, Rev. and Mrs. J. H. Webber, Rev. and Mrs. J. S. Davis, Rev. and Mrs. Thomas R. Gale, and Rev. and Mrs. Robert R. Gray.

Messenger of Peace operated as a chapel car from 1898 to 1948, primarily in Washington. Although it spent most of its time in the west, Messenger of Peace travelled through at least 20 states over its years of operation. It was the last of the Baptist chapel cars to retire, and served the longest.

Some of the railroad lines that transported the Messenger of Peace were the Great Northern, the Northern Pacific, the Union Pacific, and the Chicago, Milwaukee & St. Paul, typically for little or no charge, although that would change during World War I.

Messenger of Peace was on display at the Trans-Mississippi Exposition of 1898, and again at the Louisiana Purchase Exposition in 1904. In A Church on Wheels, Charles Herbert Rust states that the judges at the 1904 Exposition awarded Messenger of Peace a silver medal despite the car not being entered in competition. Father Francis Kelley determined to build chapel cars for his Catholic Church Extension Society after touring Messenger of Peace at the 1904 Exposition.

At one stop, noted evangelist Dwight L. Moody gave a sermon from Messenger of Peace, even though he wasn't a Baptist. The following year, while preaching in Kansas City, Moody fell seriously ill and wanted to return to his home of Northfield, Massachusetts to die. Messenger of Peace carried him to St. Louis to transfer to another train headed east.

Beginning in 1910, Messenger of Peace partnered with the International Railroad YMCA to minister to railroad workers.

In 1942, Messenger of Peace was barged to the Olympic Peninsula where Rev. and Mrs. C. W. Cutler served the community, including local military personnel. The car and missionaries were relocated near Everett, Washington in 1946, where they continued their work until 1948, when the Messenger of Peace was retired.

== After retirement ==
In 1949, Messenger of Peace was converted into a roadside diner in Snohomish, Washington, the Ritz-Limited Cafe. In the 1970s, the car was scheduled for destruction, but was instead purchased by Art Hodgins, a local man, for $1 and moved to his property. After his death, his family donated the car to the Northwest Railway Museum.

Messenger of Peace was moved to the Northwest Railway Museum's restoration shop in September, 2007. In 2009, the city of Snoqualmie was awarded a $180,000 grant from Save America's Treasures for the refurbishment of Messenger of Peace. The car is being restored to its appearance circa 1917.

== See also ==
- Chapel Emmanuel Railroad Car, Lake County, South Dakota
- St. Peter's Chapel Car, Wake Forest, North Carolina
- Abraham Lincoln (Pullman car), Adams County, Washington
- National Register of Historic Places listings in King County, Washington
