= Messengers of Peace =

Messengers of Peace may refer to:

- United Nations Messengers of Peace, a special post-nominal honorific title of authority bestowed by the United Nations
- Messengers of Peace (Scouting), an initiative by the World Organization of the Scout Movement
- Messenger of Peace, a 1947 American film directed by Frank Strayer
- Messenger of Peace Chapel Car, built in 1898, currently housed at the Northwest Railway Museum in Snoqualmie, Washington
- Messenger of Peace (missionary ship), built in 1827 in Avarua, Rarotonga
- Messengers of Peace (Foundation), a foundation created in 1962 by the Spanish priest Ángel Garcia Gomez to help people in social exclusion
