= St. Louis San Francisco (Frisco) Railway Coach No. 661 =

Railroad car

St. Louis San Francisco (Frisco) Railway Coach #661
- Manufacturer: Barney and Smith Car Company
- Constructed: 1883
- St. Louis San Francisco (Frisco) Railway Coach #661
- U.S. National Register of Historic Places
- Location within Arkansas Location within the United States
- Location: 2815 Dixie Woods Blvd., Pine Bluff, Arkansas
- Coordinates: 34°13′47″N 91°59′6″W
- Built: 1883
- Built by: Barney and Smith Car Company
- NRHP reference No.: 06000413
- Added to NRHP: May 19, 2006

The St. Louis San Francisco (Frisco) Railway Coach #661 is a historic railroad car. It was built in 1883 by the Barney and Smith Car Company of Dayton, Ohio, and served for many years on the St. Louis–San Francisco Railway. When built, it had wood sides and a canvas top; in 1936 the wood siding was covered with steel, and the roof is now a rounded fiberglass mesh that resembles the original canvas. It was acquired in 1996 by the Paperton Junction Southern Railway and restored. It is a rare surviving example of a 19th-century railroad car, with a separate compartment (mandated by Jim Crow laws) for African-American travelers.

The car was listed on the National Register of Historic Places in 2006. At that time, it was located at the Paperton Junction Southern Railway rail yard in Pine Bluff, Arkansas.

== See also ==
- National Register of Historic Places listings in Jefferson County, Arkansas
