= Prairie Village, Herman and Milwaukee Railroad =

Coordinates: 44°00′16″N 97°09′56″W

Prairie Village
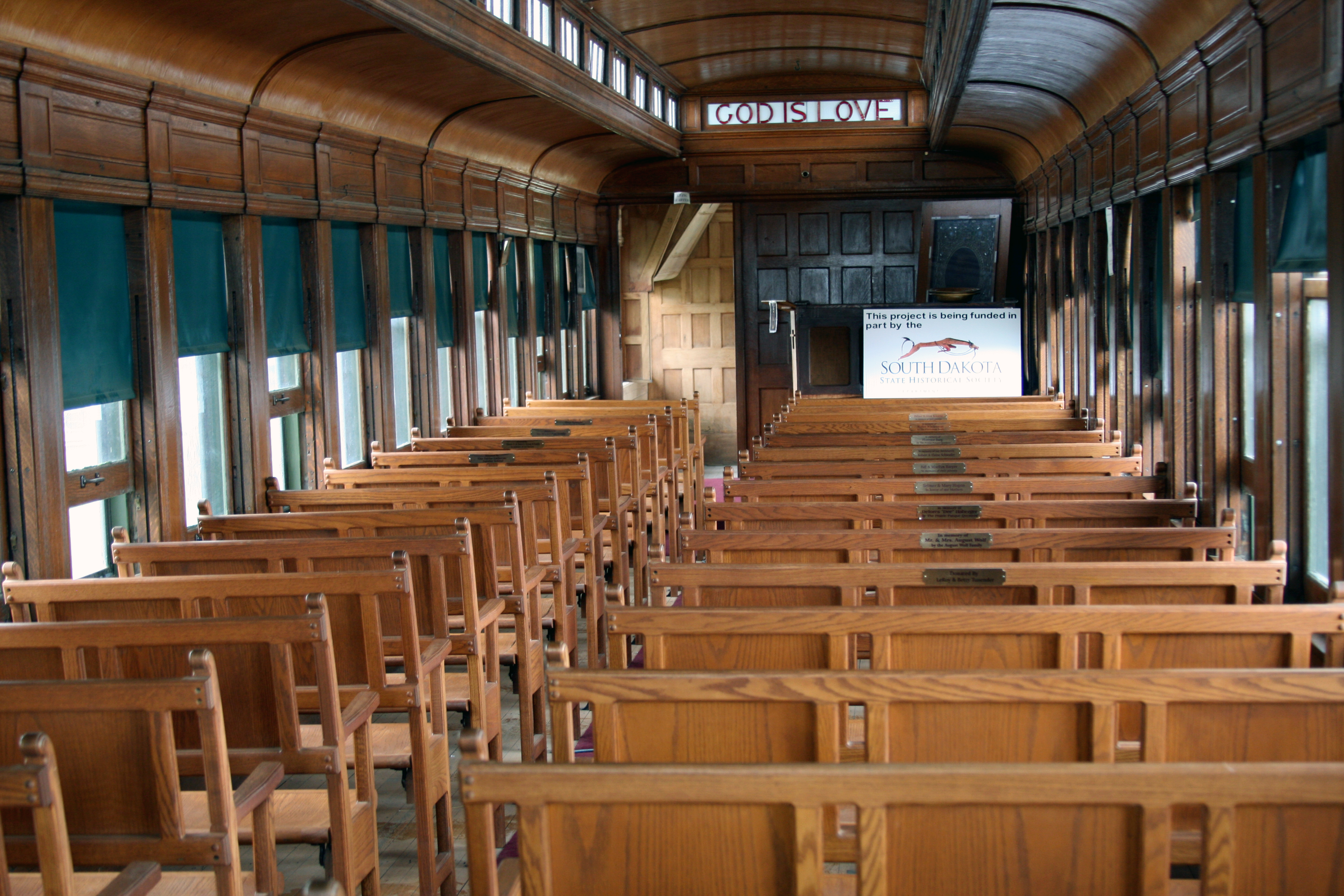
- Interior of the Chapel Emmanuel Railroad Car
- Location: Lake County, South Dakota
- Type: Heritage railroad
- Website: prairievillage.org

The Prairie Village, Herman and Milwaukee Railroad is a heritage railroad in Prairie Village, South Dakota, which is next to Lake Herman; it operates from May to September. The railroad uses former Milwaukee Road trackage as its 2-mile line, and it operates one of the few remaining church railroad cars, the Emmanuel; it is also staffed entirely by volunteers. They operate two diesel engines, but have also set up steam engines for events.
