= St. Catherine of Siena Catholic Church (Wake Forest, North Carolina) =

Catholic church in Wake Forest, North Carolina

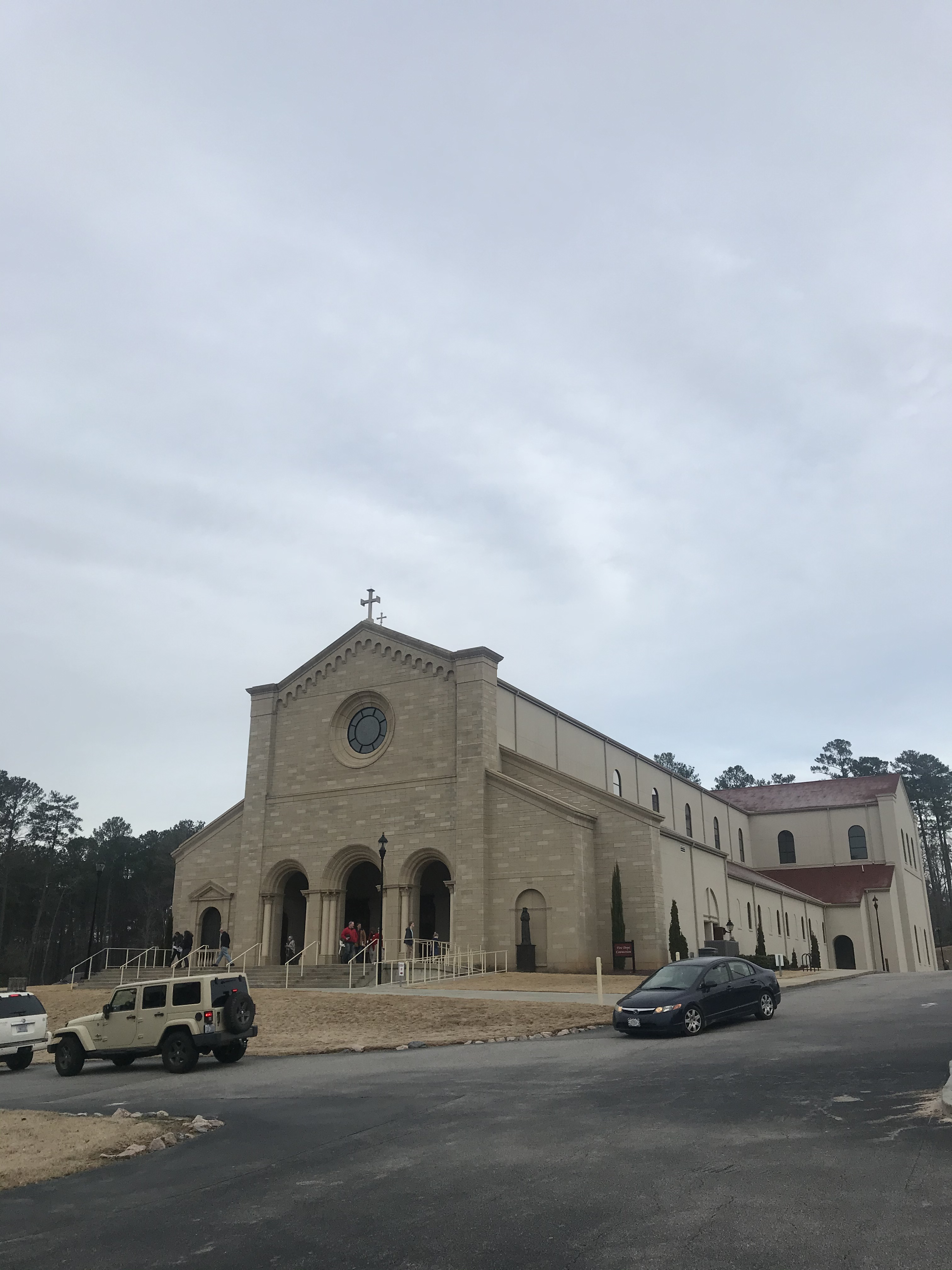
- St. Catherine's in December 2019

Religion
- Affiliation: Roman Catholic Church
- Diocese: Roman Catholic Diocese of Raleigh
- Province: Roman Catholic Ecclesiastical Province of Atlanta
- Rite: Latin
- Leadership: Bishop Luis R. Zarama
- Status: Active

Location
- Location: 520 W Holding Ave
- Municipality: Wake Forest
- State: North Carolina
- Interactive map of St. Catherine of Siena Catholic Church
- Coordinates: 35°58′28″N 78°31′30″W

Architecture
- Architect: Jim O’Brien
- Construction cost: $9,000,000
- Capacity: 1,700

St. Catherine of Siena Catholic Church is a Roman Catholic church in Wake Forest, North Carolina, a suburb of Raleigh.

== History ==
The first Catholics to settle in Wake Forest were George Bolus and his wife in 1910. Soon after, the Wilkinson family moved to the area from New Orleans, becoming the second Catholic family in the town. Catholics, who soon after settled in the town, had to travel to Raleigh to attend mass. As more Catholics settled in the area, a traveling priest John A. Beshel, the Chaplain of the Nazareth Orphanage, occasionally celebrated mass in the living room of the home of the Bolus family, using a closet as a confessional.

In 1938 St. Peter's Chapel, a Railroad chapel car built by the Catholic Extension Society of Chicago in 1892, was given to the Roman Catholic Diocese of Raleigh to use as a house of worship for Catholics in Wake Forest. The train car, which included a bedroom and kitchen for the priest, an altar, and sixty seats for congregants, was parked at the Seaboard Railroad by Bishop Eugene J. McGuinness, and was used until February 1940.

In the 1930s Bishop McGuinness' cousin, the papal countess Katherine E. Price, visited Wake Forest and was surprised that the college town did not have a Catholic Church. She donated a large amount of money for the construction of a church and rectory. A plot of land was purchased at 701 South Main Street and construction began in 1939. The architect for the original church was Frank Frimmer of Tampa, Florida. The Gothic church was built using granite from the nearby town of Rolesville. The church was dedicated by Bishop McGuinness on February 25, 1940 and named after Catherine of Siena, the patron saint of Price. In 1947 Father Tevlin, the priest at St. Catherine's, built St. Eugene's Church in Wendell as a daughter parish. In 1948 John Hyland succeeded Tevlin as priest of St. Catherine's and St. Eugene's. Hyland, who was the first superior of Bishop Vincent Stanislaus Waters' Missionary Apostolate. He made Wake Forest the headquarters of the Missionary Fathers from a mobile trailer-chapel called Madonna of the Highways, located near St. Catherine's. The trailer was dedicated on May 6, 1948 by the Apostolic Delegate Amleto Giovanni Cicognani at the annual convention of the North Carolina Catholic Laymen Association in Wilmington.

On August 14, 1966 a transport tractor trailer struck a power pole and trees along the front side of the church. A large marble statue of the Sacred Heart of Jesus was knocked into the church, destroying part of the south wall, foundation, and interior of part of the church. On September 4, 1977, the parish rectory caught on fire. On August 27, 1979 lightning struck the church bell tower, severely damaging it.

In May 1987 the pastoral administrative duties were granted to Sister Joanne DiGiovanni of the Sisters of Mercy until a new priest was hired in July of that year. In 1988 the church purchased 18.625 acres of land near West Holding Avenue for $172,212.50 in order to build a larger facility. In 1997, new buildings were built on the plot on West Holding, including a parochial school. In 1999 St. Catherine's founded its second daughter parish, Our Lady of the Rosary Catholic Church in Louisburg.

In 2001 St. Catherine's purchased over 20 acres of land west of new property for $800,000, building a new school buildings. In 2009 the church hired the architect Jim O’Brien and Clancy & Theys construction company to build a 33,000 square foot church in the Romanesque style, with seating for 1,700 people. The new church cost $9 million to build.
