= Barney and Smith Car Company =

Rolling stock manufacturer

Coordinates: 39.767096°N 84.175273°W

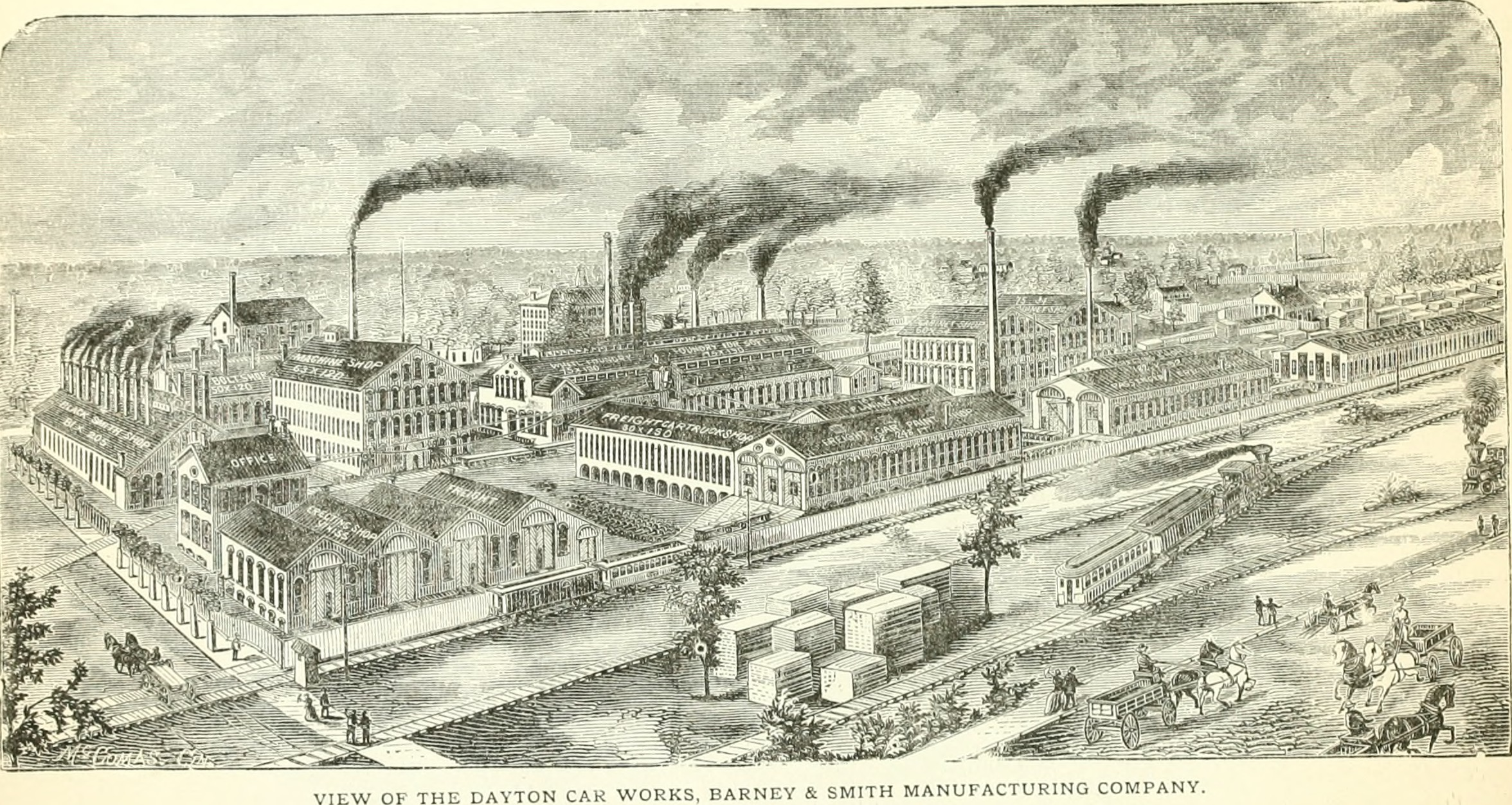
Dayton Car Works in 1875

Barney and Smith Car Company was a railroad car manufacturer in Dayton, Ohio.

Founded in 1849 by Eliam Eliakim Barney and Ebenezer Thresher as Thresher, Packard & Company, it changed names as partners came and went:

- 1850: E. Thresher & Company
- 1854: Barney, Parker & Company - after Caleb Parker joined the firm
- 1867: The Barney & Smith Manufacturing Company - joined by E.E. Barney, Preserved Smith, J.D. Platt, E.J. Barney and A.E.E. Stevens
- 1892: The Barney & Smith Car Company

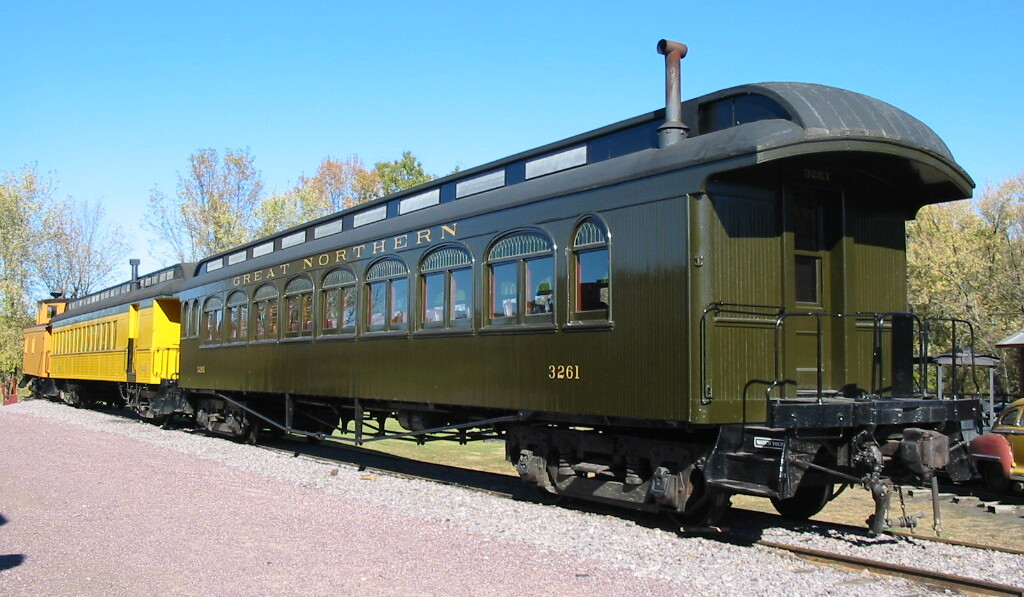
Coach GN 3261, built in 1906.

Barney & Smith faced challenges from bigger railcar makers in the late 1890s and early 1900s and went into receivership in 1913, when the Great Dayton Flood damaged its facilities; the company finally disappeared in 1921.

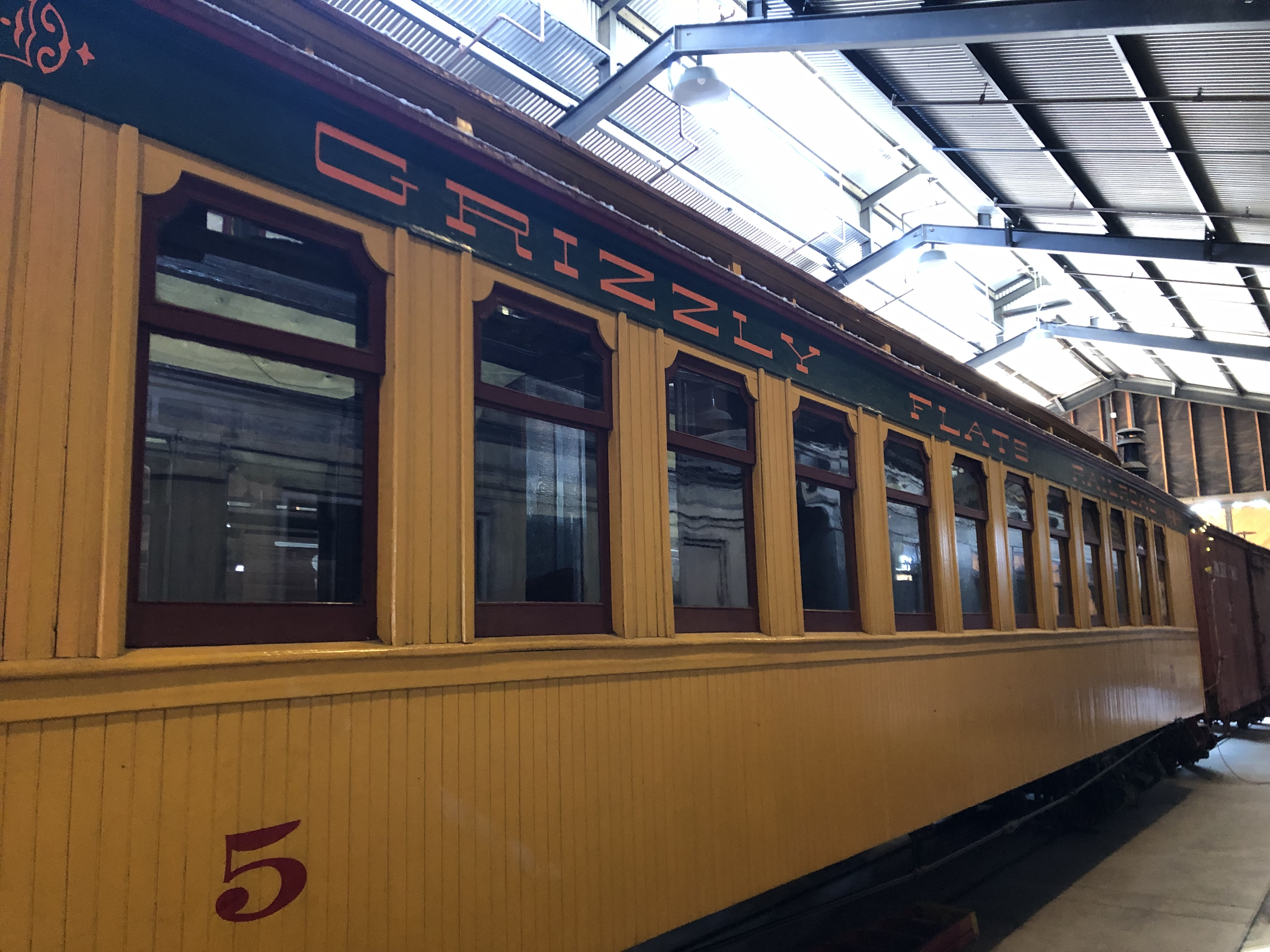
Grizzly Flats Railroad Coach #5, at the Southern California Railway Museum. This car was built in 1881 by the Barney & Smith Car Company for the Carson and Colorado Railroad.

== Products ==
- railway passenger cars
- electric street railways (trams or trolley cars)
- interurban railcars
- wooden cars for Metropolitan West Side Elevated Railroad in Chicago
- railroad chapel cars

== Eliam Eliakim Barney ==
His descendants include: granddaughters Natalie Clifford Barney and Laura Clifford Barney, and daughter-in-law Alice Pike Barney

== See also ==
- List of rolling stock manufacturers
