= Railroad chapel car =

Railroad car used for religious services

A railroad chapel car is a mobile railroad car used to provide religious services and information. The car also serves as living quarters for the pastor. The front of the car is designed to act as a "church on wheels" with an altar, pew, and in some cases, stained glass windows.

== The concept of chapel car ==
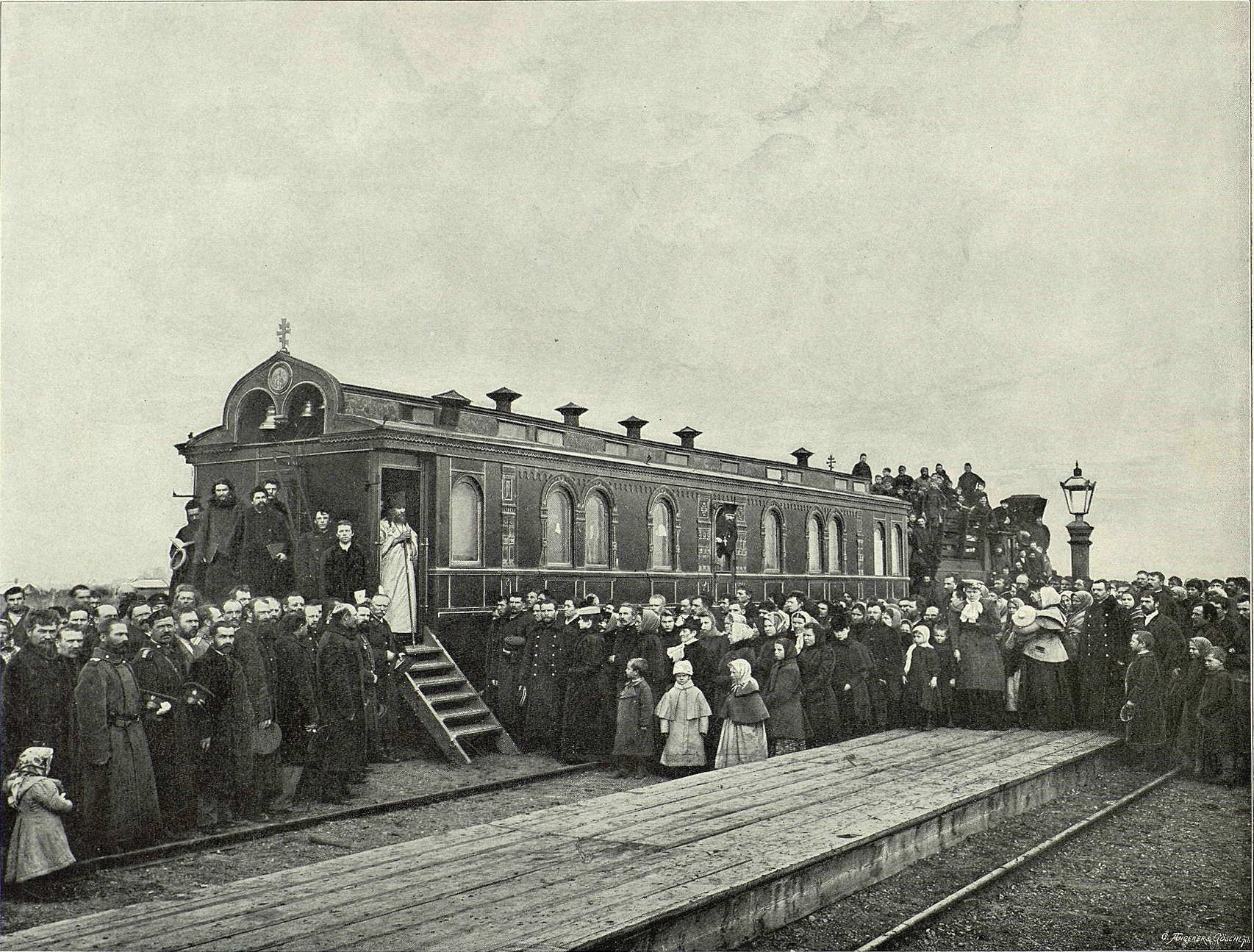
St. Olga chapel car, one of the first chapel cars in the Russian Empire, 1896

William David Walker was appointed Episcopal Bishop of North Dakota in 1883 and was faced with overseeing an enormous territory with few settlers and the fact that Western towns often were born or died as a result of the fortunes of those living in them. The discovery of gold or silver could mean that a town would spring up almost overnight as others sought to become part of the newly found riches; merchants established businesses to cater to those connected with the mining. Conversely, the news that the ore vein was spent meant people would move on to the next opportunity, merchants needed to close their doors due to lack of business, and the town was in danger of becoming deserted. With this volatile situation, if money could be donated to establish a church in a town, there was no guarantee there would continue to be enough people and donations to sustain it.

After an 1889 tour of Siberia and visiting the chapel cars of the Trans-Siberian Railway, Walker had the idea of building a railroad chapel car that could travel through his diocese to conduct services and other business of the church. He thought that while most non-mobile churches would not survive if built, a traveling church car would be able to accomplish similar tasks and would be sustainable. Walker took his idea to those in the East with a plea for contributions to build this type of railroad car. The Episcopal Church was inspired by Walker's concept and held many fund-raising events for the chapel car throughout their Eastern dioceses. He also received a large donation for this purpose from Cornelius Vanderbilt, himself the president of the New York Central Railroad. When Walker had raised $3,000, he was ready to build his chapel car and ordered it from Chicago's Pullman Company, naming it The Church of the Advent—The Cathedral Car of North Dakota.

== Episcopal chapel cars ==
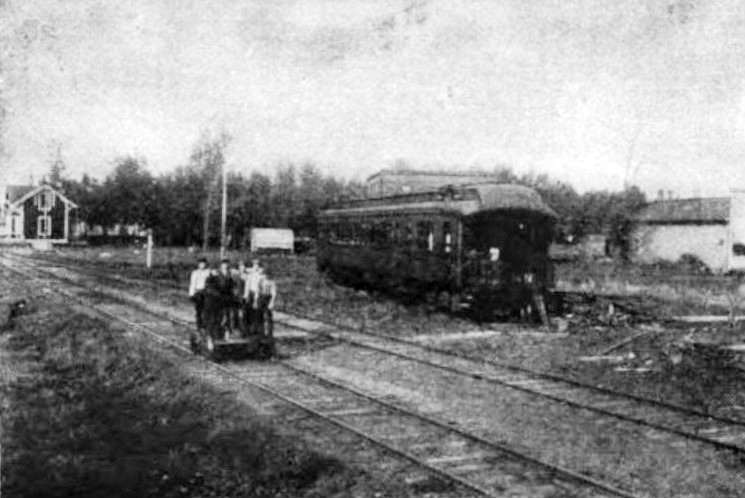
Photo of the Baptist chapel car, Glad Tidings, on a railroad siding. This was where services were held.

=== The Church of the Advent—The Cathedral Car of North Dakota ===
The car, measuring 60 feet in length, had two sections, one for worship services, complete with an organ, and the other for living quarters and an office for Walker. It was ready for transport to Fargo, North Dakota, on November 13, 1890. Walker hosted a number of Chicagoans who toured the car before it made its way to North Dakota. Walker was able to travel his diocese by the local railroads' willingness to pull the chapel car without charge. He would notify locales in advance of his arrival, and the car would be pulled to a siding near the local railroad station, where he would then conduct services.

When the car was retired from service in 1899, Walker and his successor, Bishop Edsell, had traveled 70,000 miles throughout North Dakota with it. The car was permanently based in Carrington, North Dakota, before being sold in 1901. St. Mary's Church in Guelph, North Dakota, received the baptismal font and lectern from the chapel car.

=== Diocese of Northern Michigan chapel cars ===
Bishop Mott Williams, head of the diocese of Northern Michigan, faced the same problems as Bishop Walker regarding reaching communicants who were often far from a church. He did not have the same financial opportunities, so his choice was to purchase two retired rail coaches and have them converted into chapel cars, which served this diocese from 1891 to 1898. When a fire destroyed most of the town of Ontonagon, Michigan in 1898, the town's churches were also lost. The Chapel Car of Northern Michigan provided a temporary home for services to all faiths whose churches had been destroyed.

== Baptist chapel cars ==
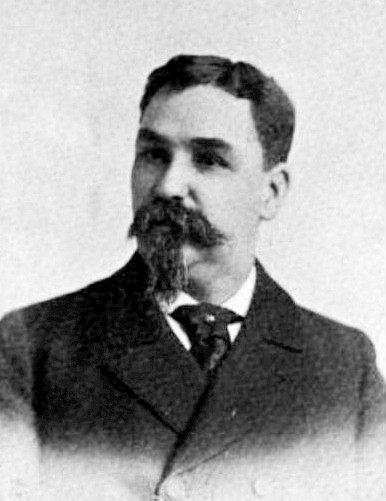
Boston Smith, a key person in Baptist chapel car work.

By 1891, the first of the American Baptist Publication Society chapel cars made its debut. Based on the research regarding children's attendance at Sunday schools and increasing church membership by Boston W. Smith, businessmen Charles L. Colby and Colgate Hoyt donated the funds to build and outfit the Society's first chapel car, Evangel, built by Barney & Smith. Hoyt, whose brother, Wayland, was the pastor of the First Baptist Church of Minneapolis, was a vice-president and board member of many American railroads. While on a cross-country railroad trip, a discussion between the two brothers was the beginning of the Baptist chapel car project. Hoyt also organized other wealthy businessmen into what was known as the "Baptist Chapel Car Syndicate"; one of these members was oil magnate John D. Rockefeller.

The Baptist chapel car fleet grew to a total of seven cars, all built by Barney & Smith during the years 1890 to 1913. Thomas Edison, though not a member of the church, donated phonographs for all the chapel cars.

=== Evangel ===
The Evangel was similar to the Episcopal The Church of the Advent—The Cathedral Car of North Dakota in size and in layout, with half of the car used as a chapel and the other half for living quarters. The car was dedicated May 23, 1891, at Cincinnati's Grand Central Depot and it made its way to St. Paul, Minnesota, where local church members provided linens, rugs, silver and dishes. The Baptist young peoples' societies raised money to have the car's windows screened, which sent it back to the shop for a time while they were fitted. The Estey company donated an organ.

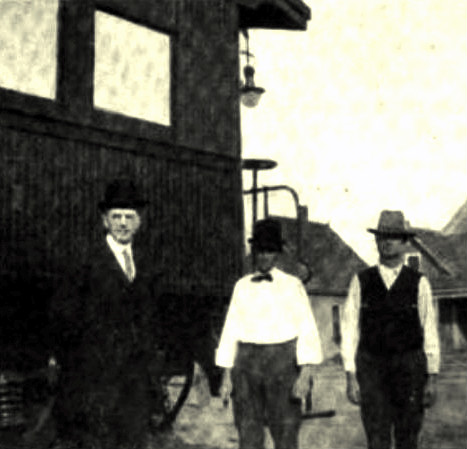
Inventor William Coffin Coleman and his workmen with the chapel car Evangel. Coleman outfitted the car with new lighting in 1911.

Boston Smith, who was initially aboard Evangel, had been provided with a letter from William Mellen, the general manager of the Northern Pacific Railway, which granted him and the chapel car free passage throughout the railroad's system. However, just as Smith was to set out on his first trip, railroad officials inquired whether the chapel car had been fitted with special wheels designed to prevent accidents. The railway's rules were that all special cars be fitted with them instead of the ordinary iron wheels used by other railroad cars. The Evangel was equipped with plain iron wheels but was allowed to travel as far as Livingston, Montana, before the wheels had to be changed.

At Portland, Oregon in December 1891, Smith turned the car over to its first missionaries, the Wheelers. By 1892, the chapel car was called upon to serve the states of Minnesota and Wisconsin. In 1894, Evangel was brought to serve the southern United States. From 1901 until 1924, the chapel car traveled the rails of Oklahoma, Texas, Kansas, Colorado and Nebraska before being retired to Rawlins, Wyoming, where the car was incorporated into the design of the local Baptist church by 1930. The church, Chapel Car Bible Church, located at 12th and W. Maple Street, has started a restoration project in hopes of uncovering parts of the original train that have been hidden and highlighting the chapel car and its missionary history. The church is open for visitors to view the chapel car upon appointment.

=== Emmanuel ===
The car was being built during the financial panic of 1893. While Barney & Smith was able to build the Evangel at cost, it was now a public corporation and was struggling to stay solvent. The price quoted for the car did not include any of the interior necessities. Many items that went into the building of the Emmanuel were donations from corporations: brakes from Westinghouse Air Brake Company, various springs and wheels, along with flatware, blankets and a range for cooking were donated. Still, others were donated by the various Baptist organizations. The car's furnishings were a gift from the women of the First Baptist Churches of Oakland and San Francisco. The car, which was ten feet longer than the Evangel, was dedicated in Denver, Colorado, on May 24, 1893.

The Wheelers, who were the first missionaries aboard the Evangel were also the first to travel with Emmanuel. In 1895, the chapel car was sent into the shop for repainting and repairs, making it necessary for the Wheelers to vacate it while the work was done. While making their way home to Minnesota, the train they were aboard was involved in a wreck and Mr. Wheeler was killed. As a memorial to him, a stained glass window was created and mounted in the door leading to the living quarters section of the car.

The car traveled in the western and northwestern states and territories until 1938, where it sat on a spur in South Fork, Colorado. In 1942, a decision was reached to retire the aging chapel car to a Baptist camp at Swan Lake, South Dakota, where it served as a meeting room for thirteen years before being sold for scrap. The car was then used for storage by an engineering company. While there, a carpenter for the Prairie Village park saw the car and realized its potential to be restored. The Emmanuel was added to the National Register of Historic Places in 1976 and was fully restored by 1982. Its permanent home is at Prairie Village.

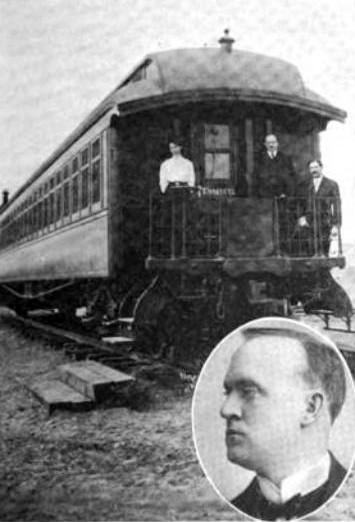
The Hermistons, who rode in Emmanuel for 41,000 miles.

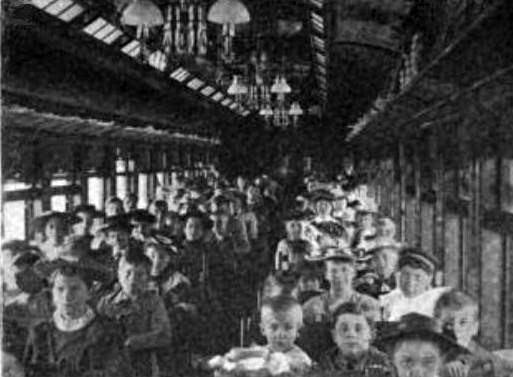
A children's service aboard Emmanuel.

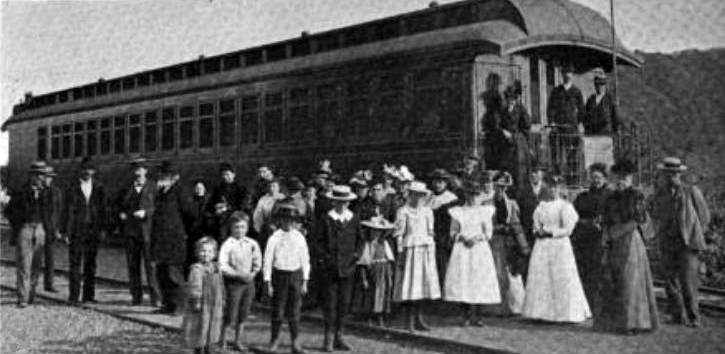
Chapel car Emmanuel in Santa Barbara, California.

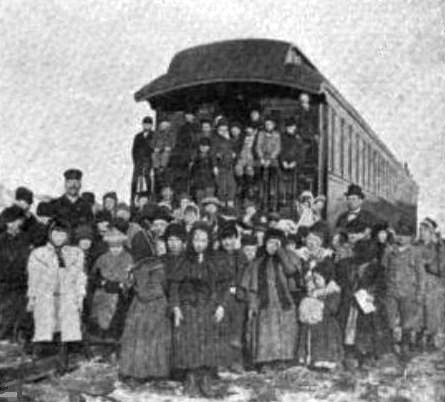
Children after a service on the car.

=== Glad Tidings ===
A gift of businessman William Hills, the car was dedicated in Saratoga Springs, New York, on May 25, 1894. Hills placed one condition on his gift: that matching funds to build a fourth chapel car be raised before the end of the year. The first missionaries for the car, the Rusts, were newlyweds at the time of their assignment. Two of their five children were born on Glad Tidings. The car traveled in the midwestern states and territories served by the Chicago, Burlington and Quincy Railroad. In 1905, the Rusts left chapel car work and Glad Tidings was turned over to chapel car missionaries serving in Colorado, Wyoming and Arizona. Various restrictions, including those of World War I, kept the car in Douglas, Wyoming, for the years 1915 through 1919. Because it had been sidelined for a period of years, the car was sent for some needed maintenance in 1920 before being assigned to a new Arizona route.

The chapel car continued its work in Arizona until 1926, when it was brought to its final destination of Flagstaff. There its wheels and trucks were removed, and it was placed on a foundation as the "Glad Tidings Baptist Church" until it was dismantled in the early 1930s.

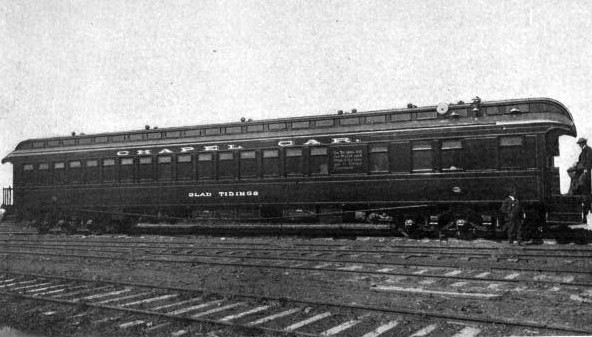
Chapel car Glad Tidings.

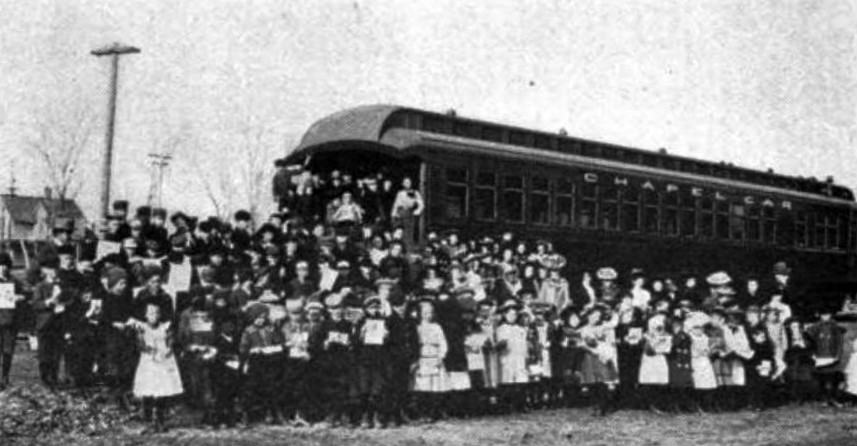
Children's/Young people's meeting.

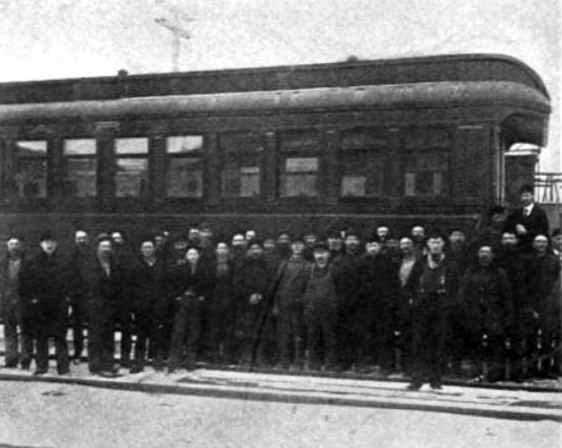
Railroad workers outside of the car.

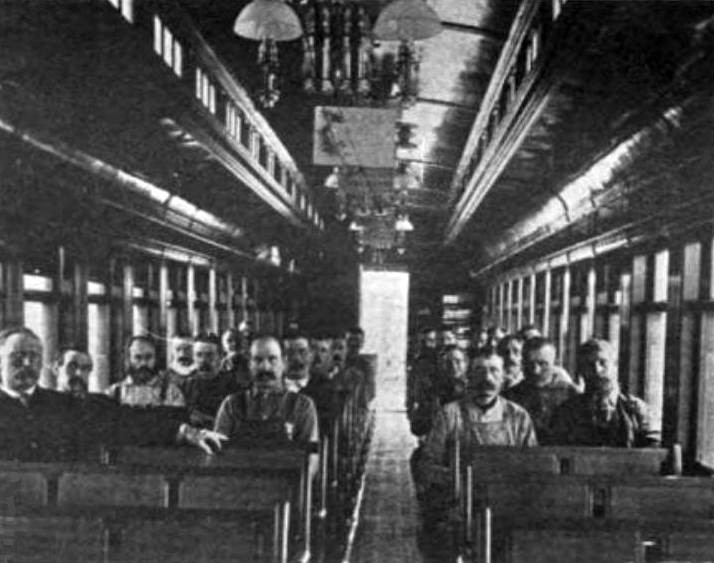
Railroad workers inside the car for a service.

=== Good Will ===
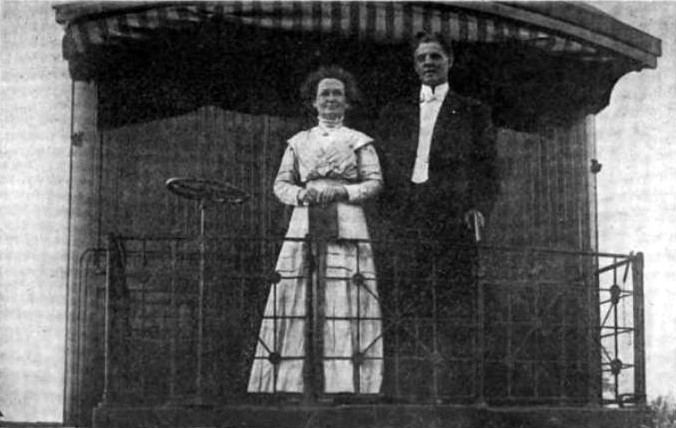
Reverend and Mrs. Barkman, missionaries on the chapel car Good Will.

Dedicated in Saratoga Springs, New York, on June 1, 1895, the car was sent to serve the growing population of Texas and worked in cooperation with the Texas Baptist Convention. At the time of the 1900 Galveston hurricane, the missionaries were in the city, but the chapel car was in the Galveston Santa Fe Railroad shop for work. It was damaged but not destroyed by the storm as a result; the damage made it necessary to ask for special donations from Texas Baptist congregations to pay for the additional repairs. By 1905, its mission service area had been changed to routes in Missouri and Colorado, later continuing on to the west and Pacific northwest, where it continued to travel for another twenty years. In 1938, it was time to find the car a permanent foundation, and it was parked behind the hotel in Boyes Hot Springs, California. The car was discovered in the same place in 1998 and remains unrestored.

=== Messenger of Peace ===
Messenger of Peace was also known as the "Ladies' Car" because it was built with $100 donations from 75 Baptist women. Even though economic times were still difficult for the car's manufacturer, Barney & Smith, the company was able to provide this car at cost. It was dedicated on May 21, 1898, in Rochester, New York. In 1904, it went on display at the Palace of Transportation at the Louisiana Purchase Exposition where it received first prize for a railroad car exhibit.

The chapel car traveled in the midwestern states until 1910, when it was sent to serve the YMCA for a year. During that time, it also traveled to Boston for a Protestant missionary exposition. By 1913, it was on its way to the Pacific Northwest, where it worked in Washington state through two world wars. The car was retired in 1948 and was turned into a diner after being sold. It was discovered on private property being used for storage in 1997; ten years later, it was donated to the Northwest Railway Museum, where it was under restoration by master craftsman Kevin Palo until December 2012.

=== Herald of Hope ===
This car, which was the last made of wood, was called "The Young Men's Car" because the young men of Detroit's Woodward Baptist Church had raised the first $1,000 of its costs. Dedicated in Detroit on May 27, 1900, it served the midwestern states. In 1911, it was reconditioned at the Barney & Smith factory at Dayton, Ohio, and in 1915, embarked on a new mission to West Virginia, serving there until its last missionary, William Newton, died in 1931. His wife, Fannie, refused to leave the chapel car, as she considered it her home. She remained there until 1935.

After 1935, the fate of the chapel car was unknown until 1947, when a photograph was obtained of the car without wheels, which had been used as an office for an abandoned coal company in the Quinwood, West Virginia, an area where the Newtons had last served as missionaries.

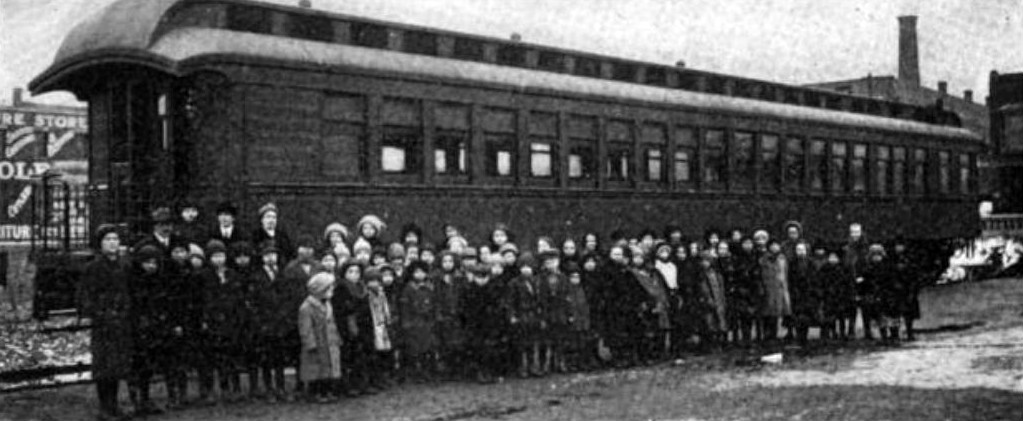
Children gathered around the chapel car after a service for them.

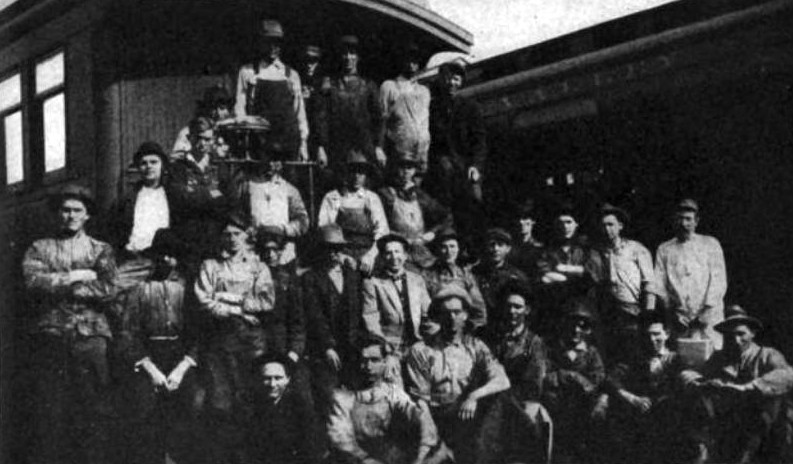
Railroad workers who attended a meeting for them on the car.

=== Grace ===
This was the last of the Baptist chapel cars built and the only one that was constructed of steel. Donated by the Conaway family in memory of their daughter, Grace, it was also built by the Barney & Smith factory in 1915, at a cost of over five times the price paid for the first chapel car, Evangel. The car was dedicated in Los Angeles in 1915 and was on display at the Panama–Pacific International Exposition in San Francisco before beginning work in California. Grace also served in Nevada, Utah, Wyoming and Colorado before being placed on permanent display at the American Baptist Assembly at Green Lake, Wisconsin, in 1946.

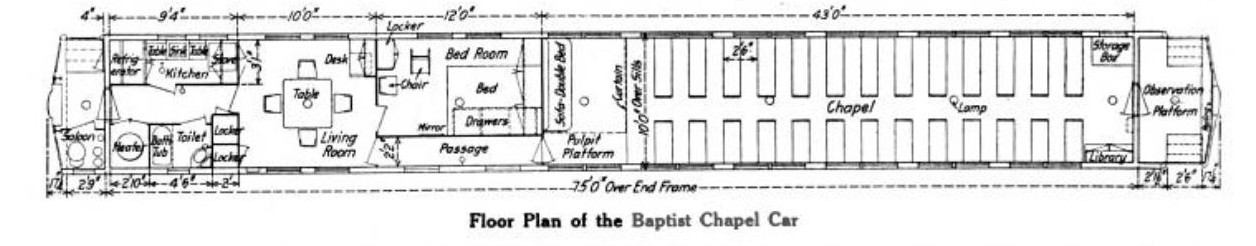
Floor plan of chapel car Grace.

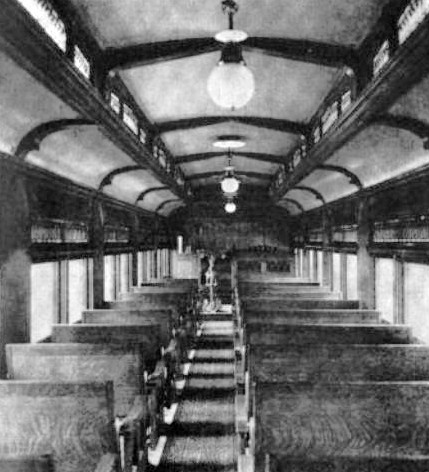
Photo of the car's interior.

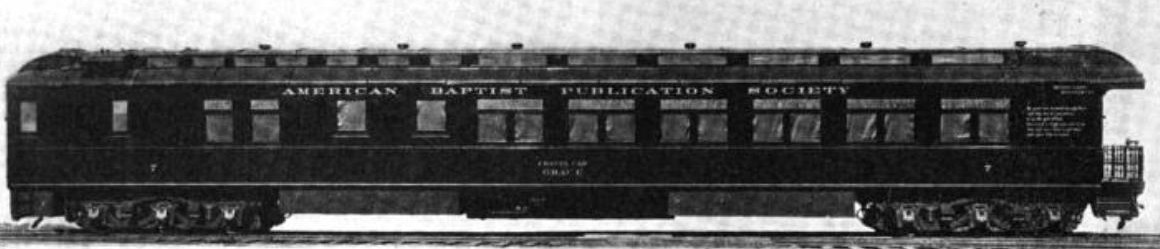
Photo of chapel car Grace.

== Roman Catholic chapel cars ==
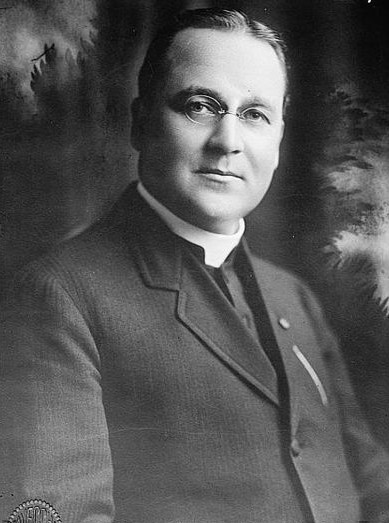
Father Francis Kelley, who began the Roman Catholic use of railroad chapel cars in the United States.

Father Francis Kelley became the president of the newly formed Catholic Church Extension Society in 1905. Kelley visited the 1904 Louisiana Purchase Exposition and toured the Baptist chapel car, Messenger of Peace. While there, he was impressed with what the chapel car was able to do for the Baptist faith. Since the mission of the Extension Society was to bring the Catholic faith to those in remote areas, he believed the use of chapel cars would be an effective way to accomplish this.

In an article for Extension Magazine, he wrote, "If the Baptists can do it, why not the Catholics?", and asked for someone to donate a railroad car for this purpose. From 1907 to 1915, three chapel cars were given to the Extension Society. Two of the cars were built by the Pullman Company while one was built by Dayton's Barney & Smith.

=== St. Anthony ===
The first of these cars was St. Anthony, donated by Ambrose Petry and Richmond Dean, who was a Pullman Company vice-president. The car, originally built by Pullman in 1886, was refitted by Dean at the Pullman factory as a chapel car with a living area for its priests. The 72-foot-long car was dedicated and blessed in 1907. It served in Kansas, Louisiana, Mississippi and also in the west and Pacific northwest. By 1909, it made its way to Oregon, where it was credited with creating more than 80 Catholic parishes. The car was taken from railroad service in 1919, when railroads no longer would handle wooden passenger cars.

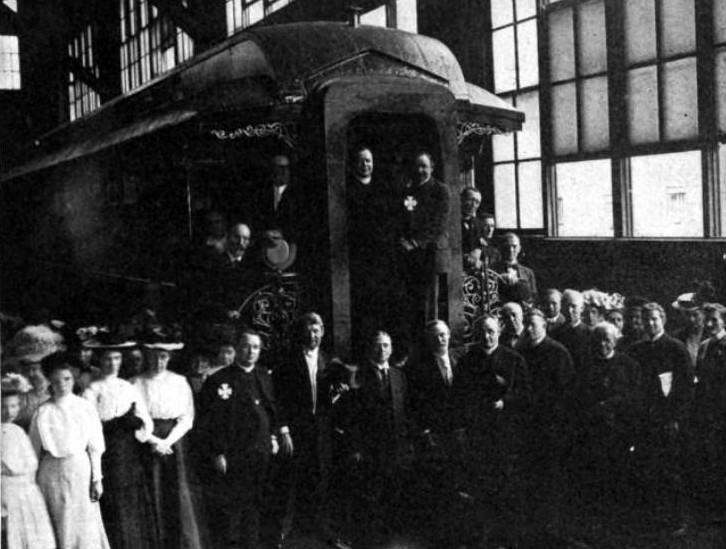
Photo of what appears to be the dedication of the chapel car St. Anthony. It appears to have been taken at the Pullman factory where it was refitted.

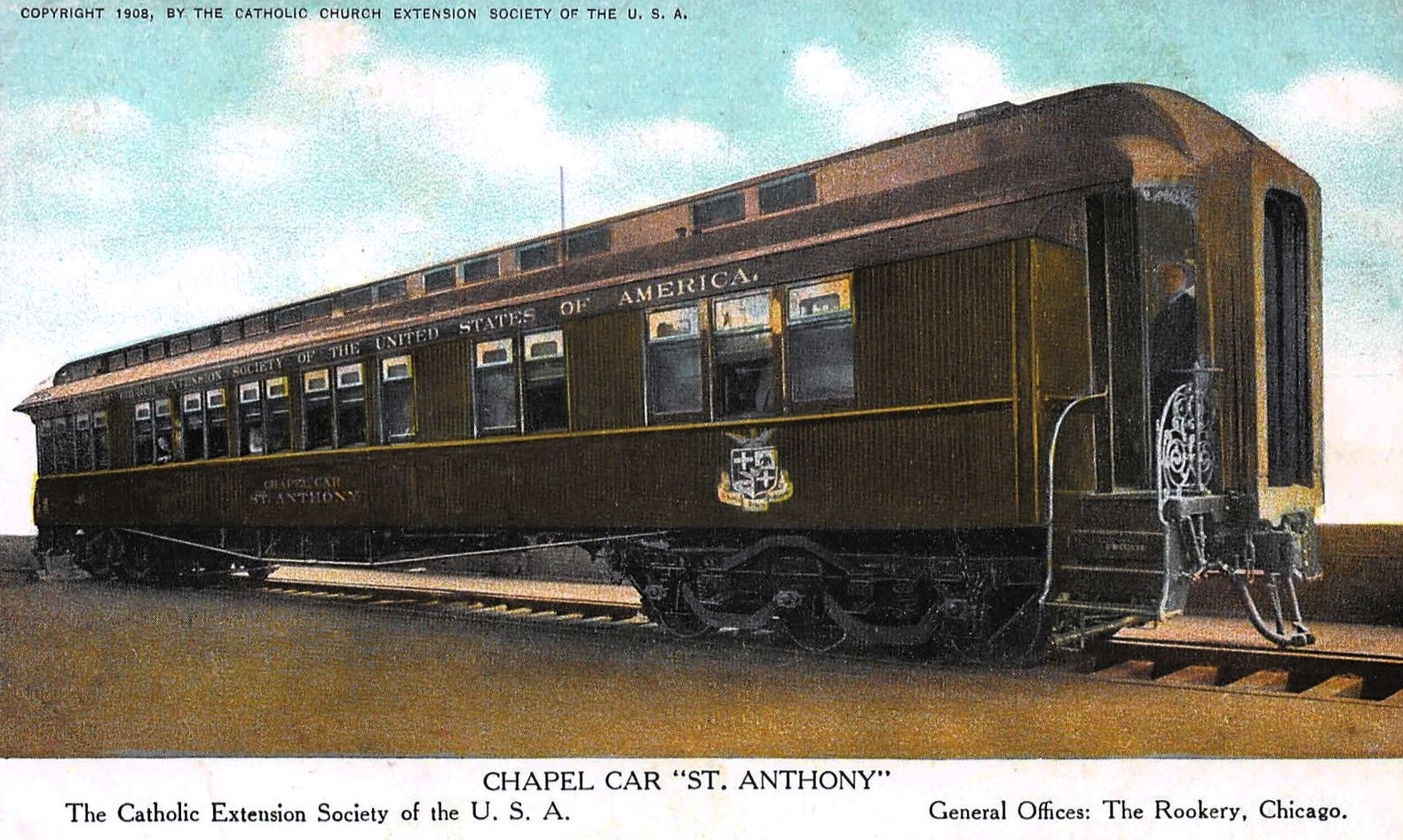
Exterior of the St. Anthony chapel car.

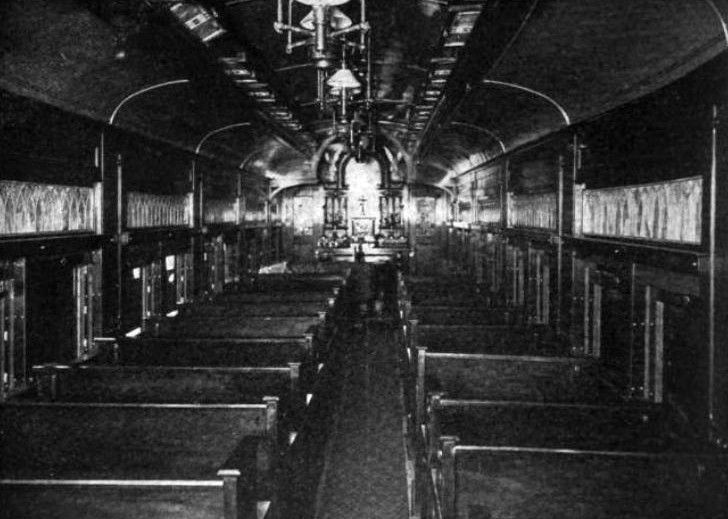
Interior of the St. Anthony chapel car.

=== St. Peter ===
When Dayton businessman Peter Kuntz visited the St. Anthony chapel car, he asked the Extension Society why it did not build a fine chapel car instead of the wooden, refitted one. Kuntz then donated $25,000 to fund a Barney & Smith built steel chapel car in 1912 named St. Peter. At the time it was built, it was one of the longest railroad cars in the world. This car was in service from 1912 into the 1930s and was displayed at the 1915 Panama-Pacific Exposition in San Francisco, coupled with the Baptist chapel car, Grace. In April 1953, after being stripped of all metal by young members of the Oxford Parish, about 1,000 pounds of copper, removed from the top of the car, had been sold for $169. In addition, 100,000 pounds of iron and steel brought in about $1,500, and all the proceeds were used for the building of a new Catholic Church in Oxford.

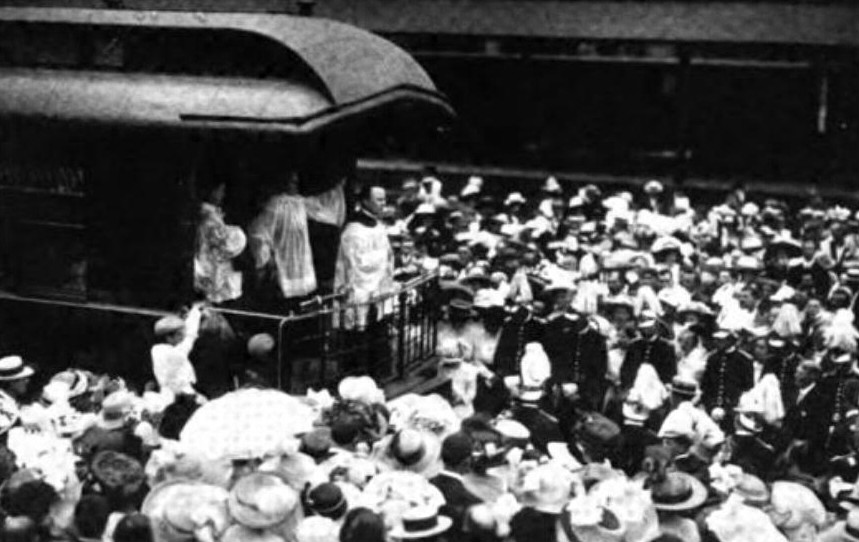
Blessing of the chapel car in Dayton, Ohio.

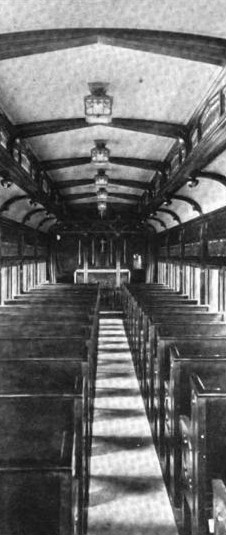
Interior of the chapel car.

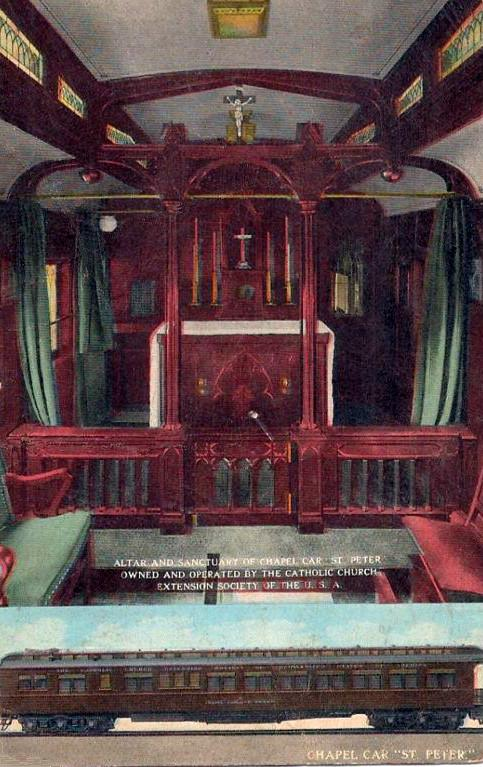
Depiction of the interior and exterior of the St. Peter chapel car.

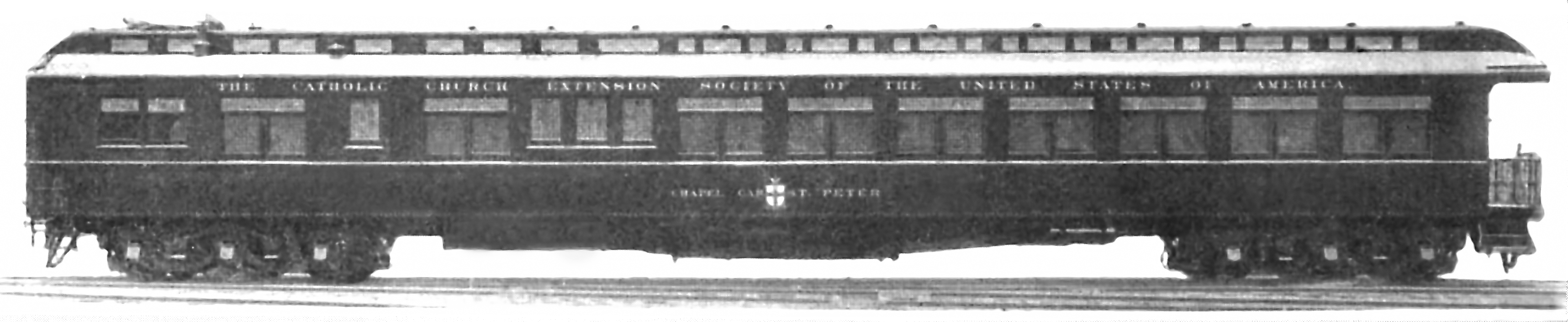
Exterior of the car.

=== St. Paul ===
The last and largest of the Catholic chapel cars, the St. Paul was also donated by Peter Kuntz. Measuring 86 feet long, it was built by Chicago's Pullman Company. Dedicated in New Orleans on March 14, 1915, it served primarily in Louisiana, Texas, North Carolina and Oklahoma. By 1936, both St. Peter and St. Paul were in storage, with St. Paul being sent to the Bishop of Great Falls, Montana, for use in the diocese. The chapel car was sold to Montana state Senator Charles Bovey for his railroad museum in 1967. In 1996, the chapel car was involved in a trade between the museum and the Escanaba-Lake Superior Railroad.

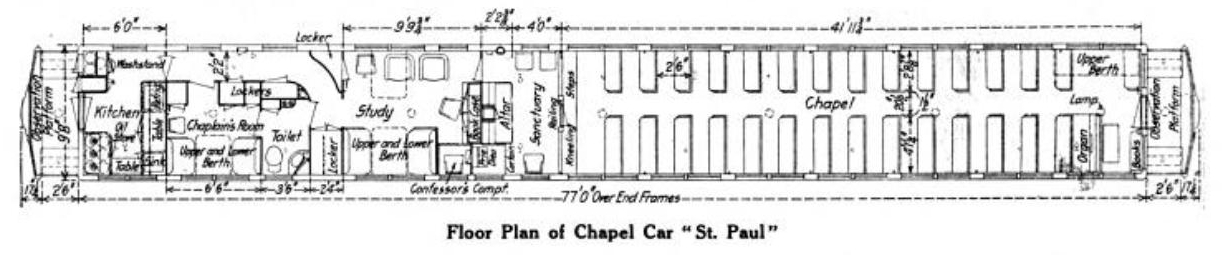
The floor plan of the chapel car St. Paul.

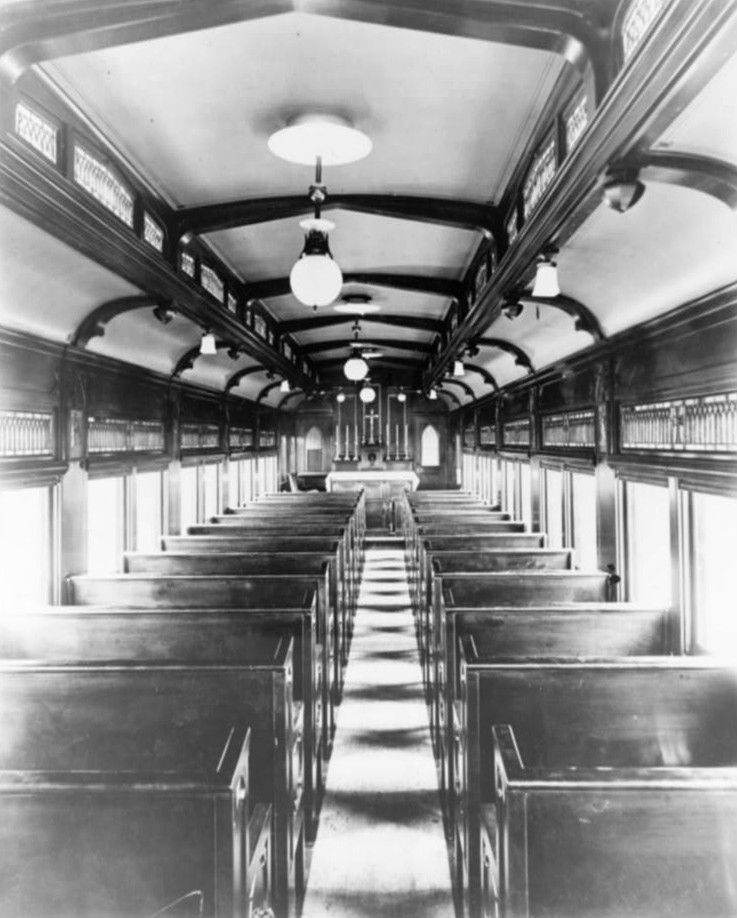
Interior of the St Paul chapel car.

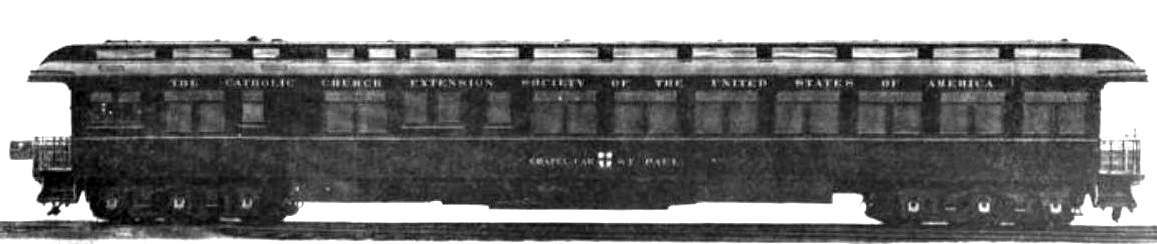
Photo of the exterior of the St. Paul.

== Orthodox Christianity chapel cars (temple cars) ==
In Russia, since the time of the Russian Empire, the term "вагон-храм" has been used to refer to such cars, which means "temple car".

With the expansion of the railway network in the Russian Empire at the end of the 19th century, there was a need to organize Orthodox services in remote areas of the country. There were not enough stationary temples. Then the idea arose to create mobile temples that could be delivered as part of a train to areas with railway branches.

=== Temple car of St. Olga ===
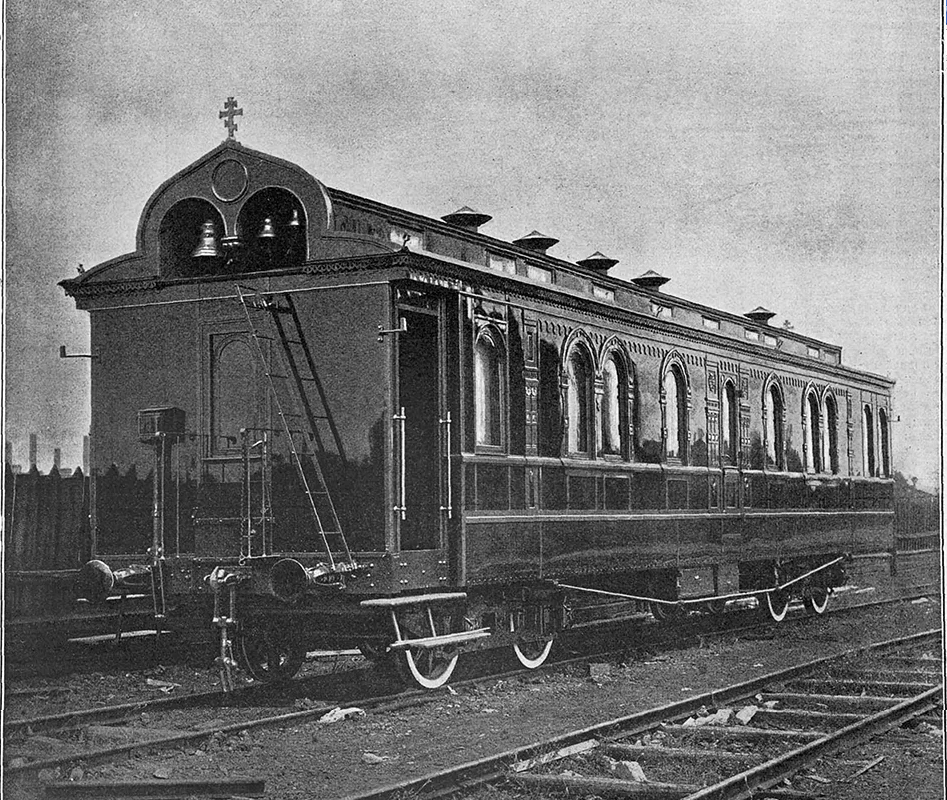
Temple car of St. Olga (one of the first temple cars in Russia)

One of the first carriages for worship services appeared on the Transcaucasus Railway. In 1895, Yevgeny Volkov, head of the educational department of the Ministry of Railways of the Russian Empire, wrote in a report to Prince Mikhail Khilkov, head of the Ministry of Railways, that there was a type of mobile Orthodox church-a carriage that could not be better suited to the peculiar living conditions of railway employees on roads running through sparsely populated areas. According to him, moving from place to place and stopping at points where railway employees lived, such a church could gather both railway employees and residents from nearby villages on holidays and days of worship. As a result, it was decided to transfer this experience to the Siberian Railway. As a result, in 1896, a temple car was built at the Putilov Plant (later renamed the Kirov plant), consecrated in honor of St. Olga.

The creation of the carriage began in commemoration of the birth of Grand Duchess Olga Nikolaevna on the day of her baptism. Eight months later, in July 1896, the temple car was consecrated in New Peterhof in the highest presence on the day of the naming of the Imperial Majesties of the Princesses (Olga Alexandrovna and Olga Nikolaevna).

The interior of the carriage was designed by architect Eugene von Baumgarten. The walls and ceiling were lined with lacquered oak with carvings and burnt ornaments on the panels, the ceiling was outlined with blue and yellow glass. Nine windows were installed on each side, which illuminated the interior space, which could be accessed through four single-leaf doors. The iconostasis was made of oak. All the icons for this carriage were painted by a great artist of the first degree Valerian Kryukov.

The exterior of the carriage was painted dark blue, varnished and decorated with carved gilded platbands made of yellow teak, a wood resistant to rot and exposure to the weather. At the western end of the carriage was a belfry with three bells and a cross, which was reached by an iron ladder. From this end there was an entrance to the carriage, with a compartment with a cabinet for the sacristy and utensils on the right side, and a room for steam heating of the carriage on the left. A special compartment was provided for the priest in the carriage.

=== Church in honor of the icon of the Mother of God "Hodegetria" ===
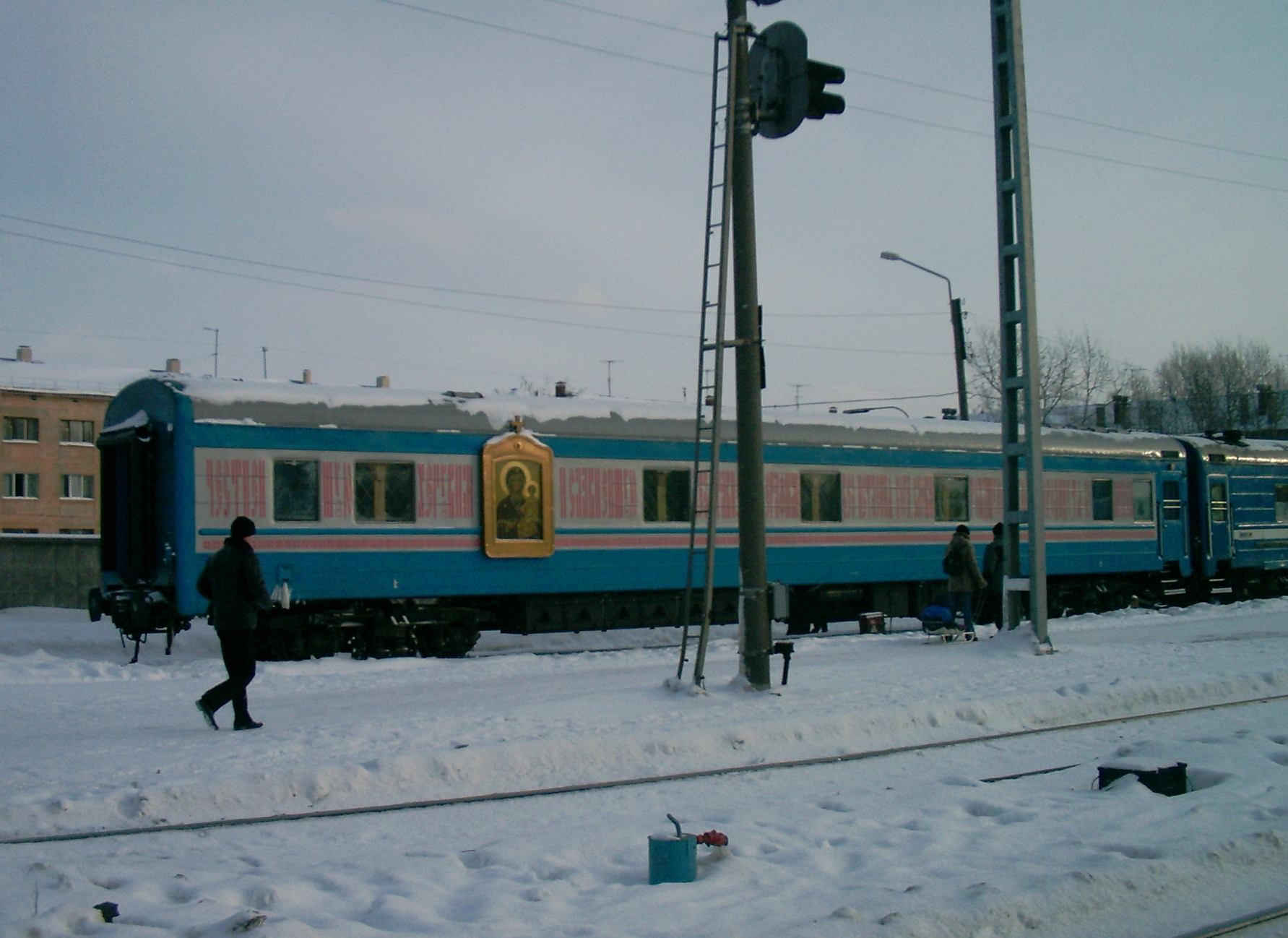
Temple car in honor of the icon of the Mother of God "Hodegetria" is on the siding

In the fall of 2000, this mobile church was donated to the Russian Orthodox Church by Moscow railway workers after repairs in Voronezh and re-equipment at the Moscow Voitovich Carriage Repair Plant. In fact, a temple complex has been created, which includes two carriages. In the first one, the temple itself is equipped in honor of the icon of the Mother of God "Hodegetria" ("She who points the Way"), and in the second one there is a refectory, a church library and two compartments. This project was developed by specialists from the Holy Trinity Sergius Lavra and the Design Bureau of the Ministry of Railways of the Russian Federation. Icons, church utensils, priestly vestments and other attributes were made by the "Sofrino" art and production enterprise of the Russian Orthodox Church. During trips, another standard sleeping car is attached to the train for the accommodation of the mission participants.

The solemn act of handing over the missionary staff by the Ministry of Railways to the Russian Orthodox Church took place on October 18, 2000 at the Kievsky Railway Station in Moscow. On the same day, His Holiness Patriarch of Moscow and all Rus', Alexy II, consecrated the temple car. His Holiness was co-served by the Chairman of the Moscow Patriarchate's Missionary Department, Archbishop John of Belgorod and Starooskolsky, and Bishop Tikhon of Arkhangelsk and Kholmogorsky. The Minister of Railways of the Russian Federation, N.E. Aksyonenko, attended the transfer ceremony.

=== Temple car of St. Nicholas ===
Temple car in the name of St. Nicholas (Russian: вагон-храм во имя Святителя и Чудотворца Николая) was consecrated on August 10, 2001 by Archbishop Tikhon of Novosibirsk and Berdsk. It joined a special missionary train with medical cars. For many years, he carried out a charity campaign "For the Spiritual Rebirth of Russia" on the territory of the West Siberian Railway, as well as beyond its borders. In 2002, the temple was transferred to the Novosibirsk Diocese by the leadership of Russian Railways.

=== Temple car of St. Innocent ===
On August 4, 2005, the East Siberian Railway transferred a temple car to the Irkutsk Diocese. It was consecrated in the name of St. Innocent of Irkutsk. This event is timed to coincide with the 200th anniversary of the finding of the relics of this saint.

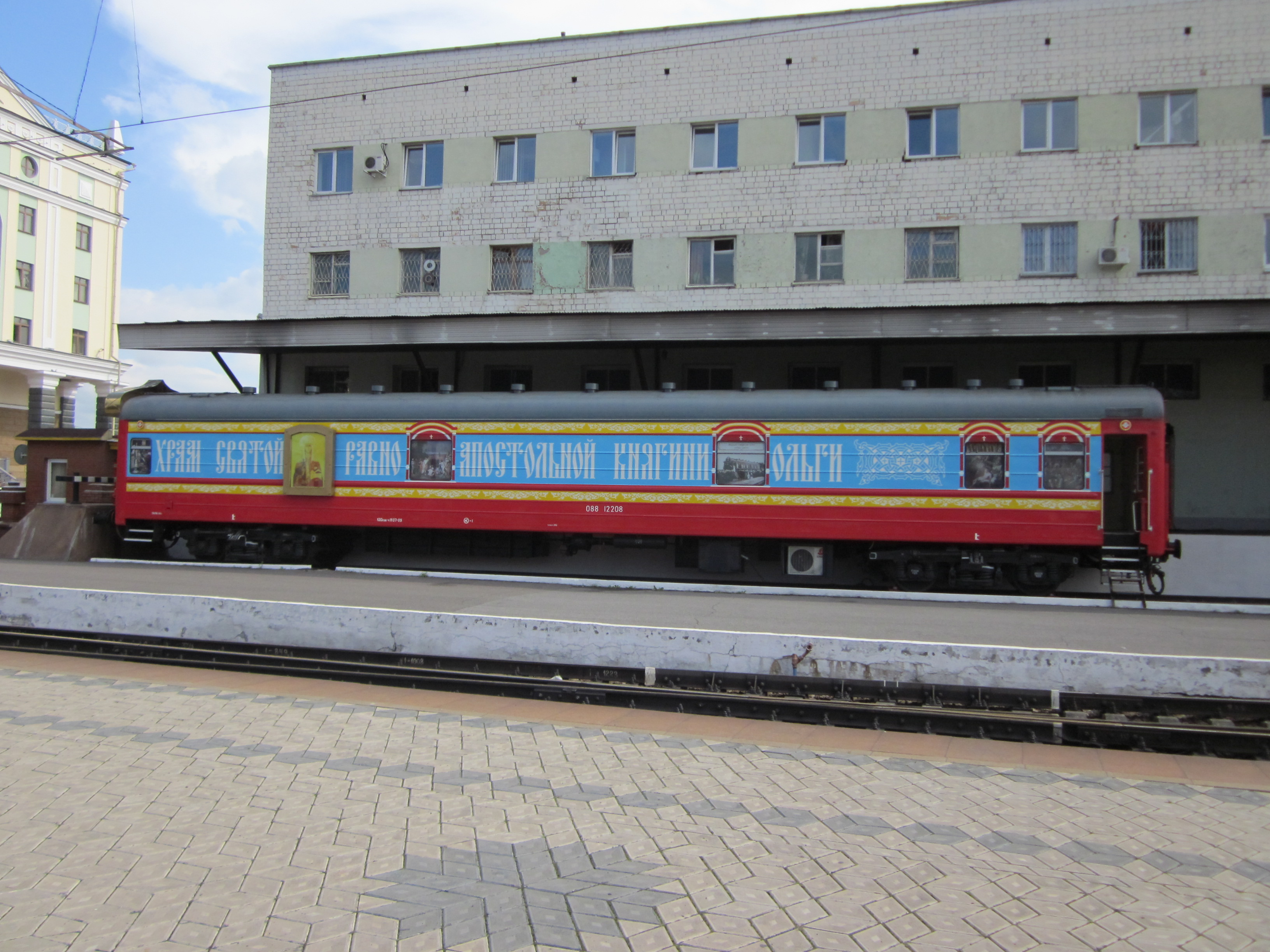
Temple car of St. Olga at Krasnoyarsk-Passazhirsky railway station

=== Temple car of St. Olga (year 2009) ===
In 2009, an ordinary passenger car on the Krasnoyarsk Railway was converted into a temple at the expense of patrons. The initiative came from the Association of Construction and Transport carriers Dal'-Express (Russian: «Даль-Экспресс»). It turned to Vladimir Yakunin, President of Russian Railways, and received support. The purchase of the car and the repair and re-equipment work were carried out at the expense of enterprises that were members of the Dal'-Express. The Krasnoyarsk Railway assumed the cost of operating the car.

Equal—to-the-Apostles Princess Olga, the spiritual patroness of the daughter of Emperor Nicholas II. The consecration was held on October 2, 2009 at the Krasnoyarsk railway station. It has become the only modern carriage of its kind in Russia, in which the bell tower is located not inside, but outside.

The temple car of Princess Olga traveled through the Krasnoyarsk Territory and Khakassia as part of the health train "Dr. Voino-Yasenetsky (St. Luke)". In December 2018, due to the expiration of its service life, the temple car stopped being mobile. It was connected to communications at a specially equipped site at the Kansk-Yeniseysky station of the Trans-Siberian Railway, and the car continued its work as a stationary temple.

== See also ==
- Mitzvah tank – Mobile Chabad outreach center
